= Michael Crouch (actor) =

American voice actor

Michael Lockwood Crouch (born May 17, 1984, in Austin, Texas) is an American voice actor. He has recorded over 300 audiobooks, through which he received 29 Earphone Awards, 2 Audie Awards, 1 Voice Arts Award, and 1 Odyssey Award honor. In June 2021, AudioFile named him a Golden Voice Narrator. As an actor, he is best known for his roles on the English-language Pokémon and Yu-Gi-Oh! television series.

== Biography ==
Crouch was born May 17, 1984, in Austin, Texas. He earned a Bachelor of Fine Arts degree in Musical Theatre from Ithaca College in 2007.

Crouch began narrating audiobooks in 2013. He specializes in voicing young adult characters, LGBT fiction and nonfiction, and Southern American literature.

Crouch presently lives in New York City.

== Awards and honors ==
=== Awards ===
Year	Title	Author(s)	Award	Result	Ref.
2014	Loot: How to Steal a Fortune (2014)	Jude Watson	Earphone Award	Winner	
2014	Maggot Moon (2012)	Sally Gardner	Odyssey Award	Honor	
2016	All Rise for the Honorable Perry T. Cook (2016)	Leslie Connor	Earphone Award	Winner	
2016	Baker's Magic	Diane Zahler	Earphone Award	Winner	
2016	The Big Dark (2016)	Rodman Philbrick	Earphone Award	Winner	
2016	Nine Women, One Dress (2016)	Jane L. Rosen	Earphone Award	Winner	
2016	Salt to the Sea (2016)	Ruta Sepetys	Earphone Award	Winner	
2016	The Serpent King (2016)	Jeff Zentner	Earphone Award	Winner	
2017	All Rise for the Honorable Perry T. Cook (2016)	Leslie Connor	Audie Award for Middle Grade Title	Finalist	
2017	Goodbye Days (2017)	Jeff Zentner	Earphone Award	Winner	
2017	New York 2140	Kim Stanley Robinson	Earphone Award	Winner	
2017	Salt to the Sea (2016)	Ruta Sepetys	Amazing Audiobooks for Young Adults	Top 10	
2017	Salt to the Sea (2016)	Ruta Sepetys	Audie Award for Young Adult Title	Winner	
2017	See You in the Cosmos (2017)	Jack Cheng	Earphone Award	Winner	
2017	Wink Poppy Midnight (2016)	April Genevieve Tucholke	Amazing Audiobooks for Young Adults	Top 10	
2018	Any Man (2018)	Amber Tamblyn	Earphone Award	Winner	
2018	Heretics Anonymous (2018	Katie Henry	Earphone Award	Winner	
2018	Hope Nation: YA Authors Share Personal Moments of Inspiration (2018)	Rose Brock (Ed.)	Earphone Award	Winner	
2018	I Have Lost My Way (2018)	Gayle Forman	Earphone Award	Winner	
2018	In Sight of Stars (2018)	Gae Polisner	Earphone Award	Winner	
2018	A Key to Treehouse Living (2018)	Elliot Reed	Earphone Award	Winner	
2018	New York 2140	Kim Stanley Robinson	Audie Award for Excellence in Production	Finalist	
2018	New York 2140	Kim Stanley Robinson	Audie Award for Science Fiction	Finalist	
2018	Oliver Loving (2018)	Stefan Merrill Block	Earphone Award	Winner	
2018	Rebuttal	Jyotsna Hariharan	Audie Award for Original Work	Finalist	
2018	See You in the Cosmos (2017)	Jack Cheng	Audie Award for Middle Grade Title	Winner	
2018	The Strange Fascinations of Noah Hypnotik (2018)	David Arnold	Earphone Award	Winner	
2018	Stronger, Faster, and More Beautiful (2018)	Arwen Elys Dayton	Earphone Award	Winner	
2018	What I Leave Behind (2018)	Alison McGhee	Earphone Award	Winner	
2019	Any Man (2018)	Amber Tamblyn	Audie Award for Multi-Voiced Performance	Finalist	
2019	I Have Lost My Way (2018)	Gayle Forman	Amazing Audiobooks for Young Adults	Top 10	
2019	Lights All Night Long (2019)	Lydia Fitzpatrick	Earphone Award	Winner	
2020	Like a Love Story (2019)	Abdi Nazemian	Audie Award for Young Adult Title	Finalist	
2020	Lone Stars (2021)	Justin Deabler	Earphone Award	Winner	
2020	Lyrics for Rock Stars (2020)	Heather Mateus Sappenfield	Earphone Award	Winner	
2020	Wink (2020)	Rob Harrell	Earphone Award	Winner	
2021	A Good Girl's Guide to Murder	Holly Jackson	Amazing Audiobooks for Young Adults	Top 10	
2021	In the Wild Light (2021)	Jeff Zentner	Earphone Award	Winner	
2021	Lyrics for Rock Stars (2020)	Heather Mateus Sappenfield	Voice Arts Award for Audiobook Narration: Short Story Anthology: Best Voiceover	Winner	
2021	The Morning Star (2021)	Karl Ove Knausgård	Earphone Award	Winner	
2021	Together We Will Go (2021)	J. Michael Straczynski	Earphone Award	Winner	
2022	The Best American Short Stories 2021	Jesmyn Ward and Heidi Pitlor	Audie Award for Short Stories or Collections	Finalist	
2022	Groundskeeping (2022)	Lee Cole	Earphone Award	Winner	
2022	Lyrics for Rock Stars	Heather Mateus Sappenfield	Audie Award for Short Stories or Collections	Finalist	
2022	Take Your Breath Away (2022)	Linwood Barclay	Earphone Award	Winner	

=== "Best of" Lists ===
Year	Title	Author	Honor	Ref.
2016	The Big Dark (2016)	Rodman Philbrick	AudioFile Best Children & Family Listening's Titles	
2016	Salt to the Sea (2016)	Ruta Sepetys	AudioFile Best Young Adult Titles	
2016	The Serpent King (2016)	Jeff Zentner	AudioFile Best Young Adult Titles	
2016	Simon vs. the Homo Sapiens Agenda (2015)	Becky Albertalli	Amazing Audiobooks for Young Adults	
2017	See You in the Cosmos	Jack Cheng	AudioFile Best Children & Family Listening Titles	
2017	Goodbye Days (2017)	Jeff Zentner	AudioFile Best Young Adult Titles	
2017	The Ship of the Dead	Rick Riordan	AudioFile Best Children & Family Listening Titles	
2018	Goodbye Days	Jeff Zentner	Amazing Audiobooks for Young Adults	
2018	The Great Believers	Rebecca Makkai	Slate Magazine Best Audiobooks	
2018	I Have Lost My Way (2018)	Gayle Forman	AudioFile Best Young Adult Titles	
2018	Hope Nation: YA Authors Share Personal Moments of Inspiration (2018)	Rose Brock (Ed.)	AudioFile Best Young Adult Titles	
2018	Oliver Loving (2018)	Stefan Merrill Block	AudioFile Best Fiction	
2019	The Journey of Little Charlie	Christopher Paul Curtis	Notable Children's Recordings	
2019	The Strange Fascinations of Noah Hypnotik (2018)	David Arnold	Amazing Audiobooks for Young Adults	
2020	Stronger, Faster, and More Beautiful (2018)	Arwen Elys Dayton	Amazing Audiobooks for Young Adults	
2020	White Bird	R. J. Palacio	Amazing Audiobooks for Young Adults	
2021	The Talk: Conversations About Race, Love & Truth	Wade Hudson and Cheryl Willis Hudson (Eds.)	Amazing Audiobooks for Young Adults	
2022	In the Wild Light (2021)	Jeff Zentner	Amazing Audiobooks for Young Adults	

== Voice acting credits ==
Year	Title	Media Type	Role(s)	Note
2009-2012	Skatoony	TV Series	Chudd Chudders	
2013	Grand Theft Auto V	Video game	The Local Population	
2016	Yu-Gi-Oh!: The Dark Side of Dimensions (English version)	Film	Young Bakura	
2014-2016	Pokémon (English version)	TV series	Trevor; Additional Voices; Man Pink Shirt; Team Flare Grunt; Spectator 1; Man D	18 episodes
2016	Yu-Gi-Oh! Duel Links	Video game	Sylvio Sawatari; Evan	
2014-2017	Yu-Gi-Oh! Arc-V	TV series	Sylvio Sawatari	15 episodes
2018	Red Dead Redemption 2	Video game	The Local Pedestrian Population	
2021	12 Mighty Orphans	Film	Movie Theater Announcer	
