= Audie Award for Middle Grade Title =

American award for audiobooks

The Audie Award for Middle Grade Title is one of the Audie Awards presented annually by the Audio Publishers Association (APA). It awards excellence in narration, production, and content for a middle-grade audiobook intended for children ages 8 to 12 released in a given year. From 2009 to 2015 it was given as the Audie Award for Children's Title for Ages Eight to Twelve, in 2009 it was given as the Audie Award for Children's Title for Ages Eight to Eleven, from 2001 to 2009 it was given as the more expansive Audie Award for Children's Title for Ages Eight and Up, and before 2001 it was given as the more expansive Audie Award for Children's Title. It has been awarded since 1996.

== Winners and finalists ==
=== 1990s ===
Year	Title	Author(s)	Narrator(s)	Publisher	Result	Ref.
1996 1st	Jumanji (1981)	Chris Van Allsburg	Robin Williams	Houghton Mifflin	Winner	
1996 1st	Octopus Lady and Crow (1994)	Johnny Moses	Johnny Moses	Parabola Audio Library	Finalist	
1996 1st	Toy Story Read-Along (1995)	Walt Disney Productions	Full cast	Walt Disney Records	Finalist	
1997 2nd	Babe, the Sheep-Pig (1983)	Dick King-Smith	Stephen Thorne	HighBridge Audio	Winner	
1997 2nd	Stellaluna (1993)	Janell Cannon	David Holt	High Windy Audio	Finalist	
1997 2nd	The Golden Compass (1995)	Philip Pullman	Natasha Richardson	Random House Audio	Finalist	
1998 3rd	Redwall, Mossflower, and Mattimeo (1986–1989)	Brian Jacques	Full cast	Random House Audio	Winner	
1998 3rd	Hank the Cowdog: The Case of the Vampire Vacuum Sweeper (1997)	John R. Erickson	John R. Erickson	Gulf Publishing Company	Finalist	
1998 3rd	The Amber Brown Collection (1994–1997)	Paula Danziger	Alicia Witt	Listening Library	Finalist	
1999 4th	Lily's Crossing (1997)	Patricia Reilly Giff	Mia Dillon	Bantam Doubleday Dell Audio	Winner	
1999 4th	Saving Shiloh (1997)	Phyllis Reynolds Naylor	Henry Leyva	Bantam Doubleday Dell Audio	Finalist	
1999 4th	The Firework-Maker's Daughter (1995)	Philip Pullman	Nigel Lambert	Chivers North America	Finalist	

=== 2000s ===
Year	Title	Author(s)	Narrator(s)	Publisher	Result	Ref.
2000 5th	The Golden Compass (1995)	Philip Pullman	Full cast	Random House Audio	Winner	
2000 5th	Harry Potter and the Sorcerer's Stone (1997)	J. K. Rowling	Jim Dale	Listening Library/Random House	Finalist	
2000 5th	Shakespeare Without the Boring Bits (1994)	Humphrey Carpenter	Carole Boyd	Chivers North America	Finalist	
2001 6th	The Subtle Knife (1997)	Philip Pullman	Full cast	Random House Audio	Winner	
2001 6th	Bud, Not Buddy (1999)	Christopher Paul Curtis	James Avery	Random House Audio	Finalist	
2001 6th	Harry Potter and the Goblet of Fire (2000)	J. K. Rowling	Jim Dale	Listening Library/Random House	Finalist	
2002 7th	The Amber Spyglass (2000)	Philip Pullman	Philip Pullman and a full cast	Listening Library	Winner	
2002 7th	The Magician's Nephew (1955)	C. S. Lewis	Kenneth Branagh	HarperAudio	Finalist	
2002 7th	A Tree Grows in Brooklyn (1943)	Betty Smith	Kate Burton	HarperAudio	Finalist	
2003 8th	Troy (2000)	Adèle Geras	Miriam Margolyes	Listening Library	Winner	
2003 8th	A Single Shard (2002)	Linda Sue Park	Graeme Malcolm	Listening Library	Finalist	
2003 8th	Coraline (2002)	Neil Gaiman	Neil Gaiman	HarperAudio	Finalist	
2003 8th	Summerland (2002)	Michael Chabon	Michael Chabon	HighBridge Audio	Finalist	
2003 8th	Time Stops for No Mouse (1999)	Michael Hoeye	Campbell Scott	Listening Library	Finalist	
2004 9th	Harry Potter and the Order of the Phoenix (2003)	J. K. Rowling	Jim Dale	Random House Audio	Winner	
2004 9th	A Corner of the Universe (2002)	Ann M. Martin	Judith Ivey	Listening Library	Finalist	
2004 9th	Dear Mr. President: Letters from a Slave Girl (2001)	Andrea Davis Pinkney	George Guidall, SiSi Aisha Johnson, and Tom Stechshult	Live Oak Media	Finalist	
2004 9th	Inkheart (2003)	Cornelia Funke	Lynn Redgrave	Random House Audio	Finalist	
2004 9th	The Misfits (2001)	James Howe	Spencer Murphy and the Full Cast Family	Full Cast Audio	Finalist	
2005 10th	Peter and the Starcatchers (2004)	Dave Barry and Ridley Pearson	Jim Dale	Brilliance Audio	Winner	
2005 10th	The Chronicles of Narnia (1950–1956)	C. S. Lewis	Kenneth Branagh	HarperAudio	Finalist	
2005 10th	Dragon Rider (1997)	Cornelia Funke	Brendan Fraser	Random House Audio	Finalist	
2005 10th	The Grim Grotto (2004)	Lemony Snicket	Tim Curry	HarperAudio	Finalist	
2005 10th	Keesha's House (2003)	Helen Frost	Full cast	Recorded Books	Finalist	
2006 11th	The Star of Kazan (2004)	Eva Ibbotson	Patricia Connolly	Recorded Books	Winner	
2006 11th	Disney After Dark (2005)	Ridley Pearson	Gary Littman	Brilliance Audio	Finalist	
2006 11th	Harry Potter and the Half-Blood Prince (2005)	J. K. Rowling	Jim Dale	Random House Audio	Finalist	
2006 11th	Once (2005)	Morris Gleitzman	Morris Gleitzman	Bolinda Audio	Finalist	
2006 11th	The Penultimate Peril (2005)	Lemony Snicket	Tim Curry	HarperAudio	Finalist	
2006 11th	While I Live (2003)	John Marsden	Suzi Doughterty	Bolinda Audio	Finalist	
2007 12th	Listening for Lions (2005)	Gloria Whelan	Bianca Amato	Recorded Books	Winner	
2007 12th	Behind the Curtain (2006)	Peter Abrahams	Colleen Delaney	Harper Children's Audio	Finalist	
2007 12th	The End (2006)	Lemony Snicket	Tim Curry	Harper Children's Audio	Finalist	
2007 12th	Jumping the Scratch (2006)	Sarah Weeks	Stephen Spinella	Harper Children's Audio	Finalist	
2007 12th	Two Weeks with the Queen (1990)	Morris Gleitzman	Morris Gleitzman	Bolinda Audio	Finalist	
2008 13th	Clementine (2006)	Sara Pennypacker	Jessica Almasy	Recorded Books	Winner	
2008 13th	The Great Christmas Kidnapping Caper (1975)	Jean Van Leeuwen	Daniel Bostick	Full Cast Audio	Finalist	
2008 13th	Rosa (2007)	Nikki Giovanni	Nikki Giovanni	Weston Woods	Finalist	
2008 13th	Skulduggery Pleasant (2007)	Derek Landy	Rupert Degas	HarperAudio	Finalist	
2008 13th	The Wednesday Wars (2007)	Gary D. Schmidt	Joel Johnstone	Scholastic Audio	Finalist	
2009 14th	The Graveyard Book (2008)	Neil Gaiman	Neil Gaiman	HarperAudio	Winner	
2009 14th	Fairest (2006)	Gail Carson Levine	Sarah Naughton	Full Cast Audio	Finalist	
2009 14th	Nation (2008)	Terry Pratchett	Stephen Briggs	HarperAudio	Finalist	
2009 14th	One-Handed Catch (2006)	Mary Jane Auch	Ryan Sparkes	Full Cast Audio	Finalist	
2009 14th	The Cricket in Times Square (1960)	George Selden	Tony Shalhoub	Macmillan Audio	Finalist	

=== 2010s ===
Year	Title	Author(s)	Narrator(s)	Publisher	Result	Ref.
2010 15th	Operation Yes (2009)	Sara Lewis Holmes	Jessica Almasy	Audible	Winner	
2010 15th	A Season of Gifts (2009)	Richard Peck	Ron McLarty	Listening Library	Finalist	
2010 15th	Lawn Boy (2007)	Gary Paulsen	Tom Parks	Brilliance Audio	Finalist	
2010 15th	The Midnight Charter (2009)	David Whitley	Simon Vance	Macmillan Audio	Finalist	
2010 15th	Timothy and the Dragon's Gate (2008)	Adrienne Kress	Christopher Lane	Brilliance Audio	Finalist	
2011 16th	The Evolution of Calpurnia Tate (2009)	Jacqueline Kelly	Natalie Ross	Brilliance Audio	Winner	
2011 16th	The Magician's Elephant (2009)	Kate DiCamillo	Juliet Stevenson	Brilliance Audio	Finalist	
2011 16th	Nanny McPhee Returns (2010)	Emma Thompson	Emma Thompson	Macmillan Audio	Finalist	
2011 16th	Alchemy and Meggy Swann (2010)	Karen Cushman	Katherine Kellgren	Random House Audio	Finalist	
2011 16th	One Crazy Summer (2010)	Rita Williams-Garcia	SiSi Aisha Johnson	Recorded Books	Finalist	
2012 17th	Heart and Soul (2011)	Kadir Nelson	Debbie Allen	HarperAudio	Winner	
2012 17th	Countdown (2010)	Deborah Wiles	Emma Galvin	Listening Library	Finalist	
2012 17th	The Flint Heart (2011)	Katherine Paterson and John Paterson	Ralph Lister	Brilliance Audio / Candlewick	Finalist	
2012 17th	The Hidden Gallery (2011)	Maryrose Wood	Katherine Kellgren	HarperAudio / Books on Tape	Finalist	
2012 17th	A Tale Dark and Grimm (2010)	Adam Gidwitz	Johnny Heller	Recorded Books	Finalist	
2012 17th	When I Grow Up (2011)	Al Yankovic	Al Yankovic	HarperAudio	Finalist	
2013 18th	Same Sun Here (2012)	Silas House and Neela Vaswani	Silas House and Neela Vaswani	Brilliance Audio	Winner	
2013 18th	The Cheshire Cheese Cat (2011)	Carmen Agra Deedy and Randall Wright	Katherine Kellgren and Robin Sachs	Listening Library	Finalist	
2013 18th	The Freedom Maze (2011)	Delia Sherman	Robin Miles	Listening Library	Finalist	
2013 18th	Splendors and Glooms (2012)	Laura Amy Schlitz	Davina Porter	Recorded Books	Finalist	
2013 18th	Wonder (2012)	R. J. Palacio	Diana Steele, Nick Podehl, and Kate Rudd	Brilliance Audio	Finalist	
2014 19th	Matilda (1988)	Roald Dahl	Kate Winslet	Penguin Audio	Winner	
2014 19th	A Long Walk to Water (2010)	Linda Sue Park	David Baker and Cynthia Bishop	Full Cast Audio	Finalist	
2014 19th	Magic Marks the Spot (2013)	Caroline Carlson	Katherine Kellgren	HarperAudio	Finalist	
2014 19th	Sugar (2014)	Jewell Parker Rhodes	Bahni Turpin	Brilliance Audio	Finalist	
2014 19th	The True Blue Scouts of Sugar Man Swamp (2013)	Kathi Appelt	Lyle Lovett	Simon & Schuster Audio	Finalist	
2015 20th	The Graveyard Book (2008)	Neil Gaiman	Neil Gaiman, Derek Jacobi, Robert Madge, Clare Corbett, Miriam Margolyes, Andrew Scott, Julian Rhind-Tutt, and a full cast	HarperAudio	Winner	
2015 20th	The Hero's Guide to Being an Outlaw (2012)	Christopher Healy	Bronson Pinchot	HarperAudio	Finalist	
2015 20th	How to Catch a Bogle (2013)	Catherine Jinks	Mandy Williams	Listening Library	Finalist	
2015 20th	A Snicker of Magic (2014)	Natalie Lloyd	Cassandra Morris	Scholastic Audio	Finalist	
2015 20th	Unstoppable Octobia May (2014)	Sharon G. Flake	Bahni Turpin	Scholastic Audio	Finalist	
2016 21st	Echo (2015)	Pam Muñoz Ryan	Mark Bramhall, David de Vries, MacLeod Andrews, and Rebecca Soler	Scholastic Audio	Winner	
2016 21st	Diary of a Mad Brownie (2015)	Bruce Coville	Euan Morton, Nancy O'Connor, Amanda Carlin, Scott Sherratt, and a full cast	Listening Library / Penguin Random House Audio	Finalist	
2016 21st	The Unmapped Sea (2015)	Maryrose Wood	Katherine Kellgren	HarperAudio	Finalist	
2016 21st	Jump Back, Paul (2015)	Sally Derby	Dion Graham and Bahni Turpin	Brilliance Audio	Finalist	
2016 21st	Stella by Starlight (2015)	Sharon Draper	Heather Alicia Simms	Simon & Schuster Audio	Finalist	
2017 22nd	How to Fight a Dragon's Fury (2015)	Cressida Cowell	David Tennant	Hachette Audio	Winner	
2017 22nd	All Rise for the Honorable Perry T. Cook (2016)	Leslie Connor	Michael Crouch and Kathleen McInerney	HarperAudio	Finalist	
2017 22nd	Demon Dentist (2013)	David Walliams	David Walliams, Jocelyn Jee Esien, and Nitin Ganatra	HarperAudio	Finalist	
2017 22nd	Hatched (2016)	Bruce Coville	Full cast	Listening Library	Finalist	
2017 22nd	The Inquisitor's Tale (2016)	Adam Gidwitz	Adam Gidwitz and a full cast	Listening Library	Finalist	
2018 23rd	See You in the Cosmos (2017)	Jack Cheng	Kivlighan de Montabello, Brittany Pressley, Michael Crouch, and a full cast	Listening Library	Winner	
2018 23rd	The Epic Fail of Arturo Zamora (2017)	Pablo Cartaya	Pablo Cartaya	Listening Library	Finalist	
2018 23rd	Patina (2017)	Jason Reynolds	Heather Alicia Simms	Simon & Schuster Audio	Finalist	
2018 23rd	Refugee (2017)	Alan Gratz	Michael Goldstrom, Kyla Garcia, and Assaf Cohen	Scholastic Audio	Finalist	
2018 23rd	Wedgie & Gizmo (2017)	Suzanne Selfors	Johnny Heller and Maxwell Glick	HarperAudio	Finalist	
2019 24th	Sunny (2018)	Jason Reynolds	Guy Lockard	Simon & Schuster Audio	Winner	
2019 24th	Finding Langston (2018)	Lesa Cline-Ransome	Dion Graham	Dreamscape	Finalist	
2019 24th	Grenade (2018)	Alan Gratz	Todd Haberkorn and Andrew Eiden	Scholastic Audio	Finalist	
2019 24th	The Long-Lost Home (2017)	Maryrose Wood	Fiona Hardingham	HarperAudio	Finalist	
2019 24th	Louisiana's Way Home (2018)	Kate DiCamillo	Cassandra Morris	Penguin Random House Audio	Finalist	
2019 24th	The Secret of the Nightingale Wood (2016)	Lucy Strange	Lucy Strange	Scholastic Audio	Finalist	

=== 2020s ===
Year	Title	Author(s)	Narrator(s)	Publisher	Result	Ref.
2020 25th	Charlotte's Web (1952)	E. B. White	Meryl Streep and a full cast	Penguin Random House Audio	Winner	
2020 25th	New Kid (2020)	Jerry Craft	Jerry Craft, Jesús del Ordén, Nile Bullock, Robin Miles, Guy Lockard, Peyton Lusk, Rebecca Soler, Dan Bittner, Phoebe Strole, Marc Thompson, Miles Harvey, and Ron Butler	HarperAudio	Finalist	
2020 25th	Our Castle by the Sea (2019)	Lucy Strange	Lucy Strange	Scholastic Audio	Finalist	
2020 25th	Roller Girl (2015)	Victoria Jamieson	Almarie Guerra and a full cast	Penguin Random House Audio	Finalist	
2020 25th	The Remarkable Journey of Coyote Sunrise (2019)	Dan Gemeinhart	Khristine Hvam	Macmillan Audio	Finalist	
2021 26th	The Good Hawk (2020)	Joseph Elliott	Gary Furlong and Fiona Hardingham	Brilliance Audio	Winner	
2021 26th	Genesis Begins Again (2019)	Alicia D. Williams	Alicia D. Williams	Simon & Schuster Audio	Finalist	
2021 26th	King and the Dragonflies (2020)	Kacen Callender	Ron Butler	Scholastic Audio	Finalist	
2021 26th	Say Her Name (2020)	Zetta Elliott	Channie Waites	Recorded Books	Finalist	
2021 26th	Shuri (2020)	Nic Stone	Anika Noni Rose	Scholastic Audio	Finalist	
2021 26th	We Dream of Space (2020)	Erin Entrada Kelly	Ramon de Ocampo	HarperAudio	Finalist	
2022 27th	Playing the Cards You're Dealt	Varian Johnson	Dion Graham	Scholastic Audio	Winner	
2022 27th	Class Act	Jerry Craft	Nile Bullock, Jesus Del Orden, Guy Lockard, Marc Thompson, Peyton Lusk, Rebecca Soler, Dan Bittner, January LaVoy, Phoebe Strole, Jordan Cobb, A.J. Beckles, Robin Miles, Ron Butler, Miles Harvey, Kim Mai Guest, Kyla Garcia, and Soneela Nankani	HarperAudio	Finalist	
2022 27th	Frankie & Bug	Gayle Forman	Stockard Channing	Simon & Schuster Audio	Finalist	
2022 27th	Stamped (for Kids) (2021)	Ibram X. Kendi and Jason Reynolds, adapted by Sonja Cherry-Paul	Pe'Tehn Raighn-Kem Jackson	Hachette Audio	Finalist	
2022 27th	Temple Alley Summer	Sachiko Kashiwaba with Avery Fischer Udagawa (translator)	Traci Kato-Kiriyama	Yonder: Restless Books for Young Readers	Finalist	
2023 28th	Stuntboy, In the Meantime (2021)	Jason Reynolds	Guy Lockard, Nile Bullock, Angel Pean, James Fouhey, Soneela Nankani, Leon Nixon, Chanté McCormick, Lamarr Gulley, and DePre Owens	Simon & Schuster Audio	Winner	
2023 28th	Coraline (2002)	Neil Gaiman	Julian Rhind-Tutt, Pixie Davies, Katherine Kingsley, Julian Clary, Jacqueline Boatswain, Kevin McNally, Adjoa Andoh, Adrian Schiller, Heather Nicol, William Parker, and Nicole Davis	HarperAudio	Finalist	
2023 28th	The Door of No Return	Kwame Alexander	Kobna Holdbrook-Smith	Hachette Audio	Finalist	
2023 28th	The Last Mapmaker	Christina Soontornvat	Sura Siu	OrangeSky Audio	Finalist	
2023 28th	The Ogress and the Orphans (2022)	Kelly Barnhill	Suzanne Toren	Hachette Audio	Finalist	
2024 29th	What Happened to Rachel Riley?	Claire Swinarski	Ferdelle Capistrano, Alexandra Hunter, and a full cast	HarperAudio	Winner	
2024 29th	Big Tree	Brian Selznick	Meryl Streep	Scholastic Audio	Finalist	
2024 29th	Elf Dog and Owl Head	M. T. Anderson	Pete Cross	Dreamscape Media	Finalist	
2024 29th	School Trip	Jerry Craft	Dereje Tarrant, Nile Bullock, and a full cast	HarperAudio	Finalist	
2024 29th	Simon Sort of Says	Erin Bow	Will Collyer	Disney-Hyperion	Finalist	
2025 30th	Black Star	Kwame Alexander	Angel Pean, Nile Bullock, Karen Chilton, Aaron Goodson, and Dominic Hoffman	Hachette Audio	Winner	
2025 30th	Louder Than Hunger	John Schu	Jeff Ebner and John Schu	Penguin Random House Audio	Finalist	
2025 30th	One Big Open Sky	Lesa Cline-Ransome	Crystal Clarke, Janina Edwards, and Emana Rachelle	Dreamscape Media LLC	Finalist	
2025 30th	The Secret Garden: Enhanced Edition (1911)	Frances Hodgson Burnett, adapted by Jeanne Sakata	Jonathan Charles, Shannon Cochran, and a full cast	L.A. Theatre Works	Finalist	
2025 30th	Skandar and the Chaos Trials	A. F. Steadman	David Dawson	Simon & Schuster Audio	Finalist	
2026 31st	All the Blues in the Sky (2025)	Renée Watson	Bahni Turpin	Bloomsbury PLC	Winner	
2026 31st	J vs K	Kwame Alexander and Jerry Craft	Kwame Alexander and Jerry Craft	Hachette Audio	Finalist	
2026 31st	The Trouble with Heroes	Kate Messner	Mack Gordon	Bloomsbury PLC	Finalist	
2026 31st	The Weirdies 3: Maybe This is a Bit Too Weird	Michael Buckley	Helena Bonham Carter	Audible Originals	Finalist	
2026 31st	Whale Eyes	James Robinson	James Robinson	Penguin Random House Audio	Finalist	
