= No Time Like Show Time =

2004 novel by Michael Hoeye

- 2004 first edition
- Author: Michael Hoeye
- Language: English
- Genre: Children's novel
- Publisher: Speak, a division of Penguin Putnam
- Publication date: 10 July 2004
- Publication place: United States
- Media type: Print (Hardback & Paperback)
- Pages: 288 pp
- ISBN: 0-670-91308-1
- OCLC: 60512513
- Preceded by: The Sands of Time
- Followed by: Time to Smell the Roses

No Time Like Show Time is a children's fantasy mystery novel by Michael Hoeye, first published in 2004. It is the third book in the Hermux Tantamoq series, which includes Time Stops for No Mouse, The Sands of Time, and Time to Smell the Roses.

== Plot introduction ==
Hermux is back in Pinchester after his adventures in the desert, trying to return to his normal life as a watchmaker. He receives a mysterious invitation to the Varmint Variety Theater from the impresario, Fluster Varmint. Fluster is being blackmailed and needs Hermux's help to save his theatre. But show business is a whole new world of weirdness for our modest hero.
