= Michael Crouch =

Michael Crouch may refer to:

- Michael Crouch (businessman)
- Michael Crouch (actor)
