= Lee Cole =

Lee Cole may refer to:

- Lee Cole (field hockey)
- Lee Cole (writer)
