= Seeker =

Seeker may refer to:

== People ==
- Seekers, a 17th-century religious group, forerunner of the Quakers
- Seeker (Anabaptism), a person perceived by Anabaptists like the Amish and by Quakers as likely to become an adherent
- Seeker, a person seeking insight into ultimate or hidden truths through mysticism

== Characters ==
- Seeker (comics), a Marvel Comics character
- Seeker (Well of Echoes), a character in the Well of Echoes series of novels
- Seeker, Teela Brown's final partner in Ringworld
- Seeker, species in The Elenium series of books

== Novels ==
- Seeker (Nicholson novel), a fantasy novel written by William Nicholson
- Seeker (McDevitt novel), a science fiction novel by Jack McDevitt
- Seeker (2015), by Arwen Elys Dayton

== Vehicles ==
- Seeker (spacecraft), a NASA CubeSat inspector
- HMC Seeker, a 2001 customs cutter of the UK Border Agency
- Denel Dynamics Seeker, a South African unmanned airborne vehicle

== Other uses ==
- Seeker (media company), part of Group Nine Media
- Legend of the Seeker, a 2008 fantasy television series based on "The Sword of Truth" books by Terry Goodkind
- Seeker, a role in the Quidditch game in the Harry Potter series of novels
- "Seeker", a song by Audio Adrenaline from the album Kings & Queens, 2013
- A target seeker, part of a missile guidance system located on the missile itself

== See also ==
- Seekers (disambiguation)
- The Seeker (disambiguation)
