= In the Wild Light =

2021 young adult novel by Jeff Zentner

- First edition hardcover image of In the Wild Light by Jeff Zentner
- Author: Jeff Zentner
- Language: English
- Genre: Romance novel, Bildungsroman
- Publisher: Crown Books for Young Readers
- Publication date: August 10, 2021
- Pages: 432
- Award: Amelia Elizabeth Walden Award
- ISBN: 978-1-524-72024-7

In the Wild Light is a 2021 coming-of-age novel by award-winning American author Jeff Zentner. In 2022, In the Wild Light won the Amelia Elizabeth Walden Award for young adult novels. It was also in the 2021 Cybils Young Adult fiction finalists, the 2021 AML award Young Adult Novel finalists, and the 2021 Earphone Award for its audiobook read by Michael Crouch. The Young Adult Library Services Association listed it in the Top Ten Best Fiction for Young Adults in 2022. The novel is described as a spiritual sequel to his previous award-winning book The Serpent King.

The writing of this book, including writing poetry the characters write and reflect on, consequently inspired Zentner to write a novel of verse Sunrise Nights with author Brittany Cavallaro who has a M.F.A in poetry from the University of Wisconsin-Madison.

== Plot Summary ==
Cash Pruitt and Delaney Doyle are in their sophomore year of high school and residents of Sawyer, Tennessee. Delaney, an early science prodigy, discovers mold that feeds on antibiotic-resistant bacteria in a local cave, and is offered a full-ride scholarship to the prestigious Middleford Academy in Connecticut. They are best friends, bonded through love and loss, but once Delaney leaves their small world, it is up to Cash to follow her somewhere new and care for the old town they're leaving while writing his own story.

== Story ==
After Delaney and Cash go canoeing on a river, they find mold in a cave and take samples. Delaney goes to the lab at her school, tests it, ans she identifies it can kill antibiotic-resisting bacteria. The mold is named after her: Pennicilium delanum. As she gains fame she gets an offer from a boarding school called Middleford Academy in New Canaan, Connecticut. She only accepts when it also offers Cash the same scholarship. For him, he struggles to leave his roots, eventually deciding himself after a talk with his grandparents and his Aunt Betsy. They both have to repeat sophomore year which they were told often happened.

As the school year begins, he is scared to disappoint his grandparents and does not want to let them down. Delaney thrives, but Cash feels succumbed by the amount of work every day. He becomes friends with Alex and Viviani. He joins the crew and due to Dr. Adkins, his poetry teacher, he discovers that he has a talent for writing. It brings him solace and after his grandfather's death, he takes refuge in his notebook.

Cash takes the first flight to Knoxville and goes to the hospital where his grandfather is being held. That evening Delaney rushes in with a jar of Pennicilium delanum to try to save him, but a security guard and the doctor holds her back. A few hours later, he dies. The next day, Cash, Delaney and Cash's grandmother canoe down the river next to their town and scatter Cash's grandfather's ashes. The next day, the two friends return to Middleford. The next few months pass mournfully as he struggles with school.

One day, Cash discovers a girl unconscious in his room with his roommate Tripp attempting to sexually assault her. Cash attempts to report this but gets knocked against a wall and is taken to the hospital. Delaney comes to see him and tells him she had always been in love with him. He understands that he also was and they kiss. After that, the head of the school - Dr. Archampong - comes in and tells Cash that he is not expelled as he thought he would be but instead he is appreciated by the school for his act of courage.
