= The Seeker =

The Seeker may refer to:

== Film and television ==
- The Seeker (film), a 2007 film adaptation of the second book of the Dark Is Rising novel series
- "The Seeker" (That '70s Show), a television episode

== Music ==
- The Seeker (album), by Cloud Cult, 2016
- "The Seeker" (Dolly Parton song), 1975
- "The Seeker" (The Who song), 1970
- "(I Am) The Seeker", a song written by Benny Andersson and Björn Ulvaeus of ABBA, 1983
- "The Seeker", a song by Steve Earle from The Revolution Starts Now, 2004

== Other ==
- The Seeker, a 1994 Dungeons & Dragons novel by Simon Hawke

== See also ==
- Legend of the Seeker, a 2008 television series based on the Sword of Truth novels by Terry Goodkind
- Seeker (disambiguation)
- Seekers (disambiguation), including uses of The Seekers
