= Time to Smell the Roses =

2007 novel by Michael Hoeye

- 2007 first edition
- Author: Michael Hoeye
- Language: English
- Genre: Children's novel
- Publisher: Speak, a division of Penguin Putnam
- Publication date: 2007
- Publication place: United States
- Media type: Print (Hardback & Paperback)
- ISBN: 0-141-32178-4
- Preceded by: No Time Like Show Time

Time to Smell the Roses is a children's fantasy mystery novel by Michael Hoeye, first published in 2007. It is the fourth book in the Hermux Tantamoq series, which includes Time Stops for No Mouse, The Sands of Time, and No Time Like Show Time.

== Plot summary ==
While watchmaker and sporadic detective-mouse Hermux Tantamoq is planning his wedding to the aviator Linka Perflinger, multi-millionaire Androse De Rosenquill sends for him and asks him to find a missing squirrel. At the same time, the cosmetics boss Tucka Mertslin is scheming with an unprincipled scientist against a rival cosmetician. A beautiful garden is vandalized, and a body is found which no one recognizes. As Hermux carefully pursues his task, he finds unexpected connections.

The familiar cast of rodents, insects, and others from the three previous Hermux Tantamoq books now includes Thirxen Ghoulter, a coroner whose profession is taxidermy.

Terfle is Hermux's smart pet ladybug, who travels with him and likes to eat jelly and dried aphids.
