= Johnny Moses =

Tulalip Native American master storyteller

Johnny Moses, also known by the traditional name Whis.stem.men.knee, or Walking Medicine Robe, is a Nuu-chah-nulth and Tulalip Coast Salish storyteller, singer, oral historian and cultural educator. Smithsonian Folkways identifies him as “Nuu-chah-nulth and Coast Salish Tulalip,” and SIUE describes him as a “Nuu-chah-nulth and Tulalip Coastal Salish tradition-bearer.”

Moses has also been described as a Tulalip Native American master storyteller, oral historian, healer and spiritual leader. Jack Straw Cultural Center describes him as a “Tulalip Native American master storyteller, oral historian, healer and spiritual leader.”

Moses's work is associated with storytelling, oral history, medicine songs and cultural traditions of Native peoples of the Pacific Northwest Coast.

Moses received the Washington Governor's Heritage Award in 2012. ArtsWA's official list includes Johnny Moses among the 2012 Governor's Arts & Heritage Awards honorees.

== Early life and background ==
Moses was raised on Vancouver Island, British Columbia, Canada in the village of Ohiat. The Hemispheric Institute says he was raised in Ohiat, and the Tulalip News/ArtsWA article says he was raised in the remote Nuu-chah-nulth village of Ohiat on the west coast of Vancouver Island.

Moses learned tribal traditions from his grandparents. The Hemispheric Institute says he learned tribal traditions from his grandparents, and the Tulalip News/ArtsWA article says his grandparents taught him the traditional ways. The Tulalip News/ArtsWA article also says his elders sent him to share their teachings with all people.

Moses's traditional name is Whis.stem.men.knee (translated as Walking Medicine Robe).[1][2] This is supported by the Hemispheric Institute, Tulalip News/ArtsWA, Jack Straw Cultural Center and Moses's official biography.

In addition to speaking English, Moses is fluent in eight native languages. The Hemispheric Institute, Jack Straw Cultural Center, Tulalip News/ArtsWA and his official biography all support this.

Moses can also tell stories in traditional sign language. Jack Straw Cultural Center says he can tell stories in traditional sign language, and his booking page says he shares stories in English, traditional sign language and one of the eight Native languages he speaks.

Moses's official biography states that between 1981 and 1985, he taught Coast Salish traditional songs and dances to children at the Tulalip Reservation, many of whom were members of his family. The group became known as the Tulalip Coast Salish Powwow Club and performed at local schools and cultural events.

== Storytelling and cultural work ==
The Hemispheric Institute describes Moses as a storyteller, oral historian and traditional healer who shares knowledge through storytelling, lectures and workshops.

The Hemispheric Institute's digital video library includes documentation of Moses telling children's stories and adult stories at the American Indian Community House. The same source says his stories come from several tribes and carry messages that have informed Native life for hundreds of years.

Moses's official biography describes him as a traveling ambassador for Northwest Coast cultures who shares cultural and spiritual traditions through storytelling, lectures and workshops across the United States and Canada.

His booking page says he lectures on Northwest Coast culture and spirituality and combines oral-history knowledge with a bachelor's degree in education.

Moses has appeared at public storytelling events in Washington state. In 2008, the San Juan Journal reported that he would speak at the San Juan Island Grange, describing him as a Coast Salish storyteller and memory keeper.

In 2009, the San Juan Journal reported that Moses would appear at the San Juan Island Library for a free public storytelling event.

== Teachers and influences ==
Moses's official website identifies several elders and culture-bearers connected to his work, including Vi Hilbert, Pauline Hillaire, Ivy and Barney Guss, and Arnold Troeh.

The same page describes Vi Hilbert, taqʷšəblu, as an Upper Skagit woman whose life's work focused on preserving the Lushootseed language and culture.

The official site also identifies Pauline Hillaire, Scälla, as a Lummi culture bearer, oral historian, storyteller, teacher of song and dance, recording artist and author.

== Collaboration with Gregory Fields ==
Moses has collaborated with Gregory P. Fields, a professor connected with philosophy and Native American Studies at Southern Illinois University Edwardsville. SIUE's IRIS center reports that Fields worked with Moses for about 20 years on Sacred Breath: Pacific Northwest Oral Literature and Medicine Teachings.

SIUE describes Moses as a Nuu-chah-nulth and Tulalip Coast Salish tradition-bearer, an ancestrally trained singer and storyteller, and a teller of epics.

Jack Straw Cultural Center also connects Moses to Fields's work. Jack Straw states that in 2010 and 2013, Fields produced audio CDs with songs, cultural knowledge and biographical information from Coast Salish culture-bearers Pauline Hillaire and Johnny Moses.

Jack Straw's Johnny Moses page says that in 2013, a media companion to Sacred Breath: Pacific Northwest Culture and Medicine Teachings was produced by Gregory Fields. It also says that in 2010, Fields worked with Moses and Pauline Hillaire to produce recordings of songs, cultural knowledge and biographical information.

As of 2026, Sacred Breath: Pacific Northwest Medicine Teachings, Stories, and Epics is listed by University of Toronto Press Distribution as a forthcoming University of Nebraska Press book by Johnny Moses, edited by Gregory P. Fields, with a sales date of June 1, 2027.

== Recordings ==
Moses is the artist on Pacific Northwest Medicine Songs of the Four Seasons, released by Smithsonian Folkways Recordings in 2017.

Smithsonian Folkways lists the release under the American Indian genre and lists instruments including drum, hand bell, rattle, lead vocals and spoken word.

Jack Straw describes Pacific Northwest Medicine Songs of the Four Seasons as four audio CDs with a total running time of 3 hours and 49 minutes, sung by Johnny Moses, Whis.stem.men.knee / Walking Medicine Robe.

Jack Straw also says that recordings from Fields's residencies were incorporated into releases including Pacific Northwest Medicine Songs of the Four Seasons.

Moses also recorded The Third Ear. Publishers Weekly described The Third Ear as a release in which Johnny Moses, a Tulalip Native American storyteller, shares stories and songs from the First People of the Pacific Northwest.

Moses's official recordings page lists additional recordings, including American Indian Voices Presents: Johnny Moses, Storyteller from the Northwest Pacific Coast, Native American Bedtime Stories for Adults, Medicine Path, Prophecy Teachings of the First Peoples of the Northwest Coast, When the Humans Thought They Were People, Wisdom and Grandmother Cedar Story, The Prophecy Story, and Songs & Stories of Chief Seattle.

== Archives ==
Archival materials related to Moses are held in the Vi Hilbert collection. Archives West lists a “Johnny Moses” subseries within “Recordings - By Speaker.”

The Vi Hilbert collection includes Moses-related audio and video recordings from the 1980s and 1990s, including epic stories, songs, workshops, ceremonies and other recordings.

The Loran Olsen Papers also include audiovisual material related to Pacific Northwest American Indian culture. Archives West says there is a substantial amount of material specifically related to Vi Hilbert, Johnny Moses and the Lushootseed language.

The Loran Olsen Papers also list materials labeled “Johnny Moses, Swinomish Indian Reservation, Tulalip Indian Reservation.”

== Awards and recognition ==
In 2012, Moses was one of the recipients of the Washington Governor's Arts & Heritage Awards. ArtsWA's official list includes Johnny Moses among the 2012 honorees.

The Tulalip News/ArtsWA article says Moses was one of seven recipients of the Governor's Arts & Heritage Awards and that recipients were honored at a reception at the Governor's Mansion on October 15, 2012.

The Tulalip News/ArtsWA article says the awards recognize individuals and organizations that have made significant contributions to Washington state's arts and cultural traditions.

The same article says Moses was honored as a Native American traditional singer and storyteller who speaks eight Native languages and travels extensively to share his culture.

The Tulalip News/ArtsWA article quotes Kris Tucker, then executive director of ArtsWA, saying that Moses had “incredible skill as a storyteller” and “a wealth of irreplaceable information about the Northwest’s Native cultures.”

== Published works ==
- The Acupuncture Bible (2015)
- The Medicine Clothes that Look at the People: An Ancient Epic Tale from the Samish People of the Pacific Coastal Northwest (2020)
- Octopus Lady and Crow & Other Animal People Stories of the Northwest Coast
- Medicine Path: Healing Songs and Stories of the Northwest Native Americans
- Sacred Breath: Pacific Northwest Medicine Teachings, Stories, and Epics (Available June 2027)
