= Seekers (disambiguation) =

Seekers were a 17th-century religious group.

Seekers may also refer to:

- Seekers (TV series), a British TV film starring Josette Simon and Brenda Fricker
- Seekers (novel series), book series by Erin Hunter
- Seekers (Transformers), a group of Decepticons that commonly transform into fighter jets in the Transformers fictional universe
- The Seekers, Australian folk-influenced pop group
  - The New Seekers, a British pop group formed by a member of the Seekers
  - The Seekers (1964 album), a 1964 self-titled studio album by the band
  - The Seekers (1975 album), a 1975 self-titled studio album by the band
- The Seekers, a 1952 adventure novel by John Guthrie, set in early 19th century New Zealand
  - The Seekers (1954 film), a 1954 film based on the novel by John Guthrie
- The Seekers (novel), a 1975 novel by John Jakes concerning 1794–1814 United States history
  - The Seekers (1979 film), a 1979 film based on the novel by John Jakes
- The Seekers (Boorstin book), 1998 non-fiction book of cultural history in the "knowledge" trilogy
- The Seekers (comics), British 1960s newspaper comic strip
- The Seekers, demons on the television show Charmed
- Seekers, a religion in the Dragonlance novels
- The Seekers (rapturists), a UFO religion

== See also ==
- Seeker (disambiguation)
- The Seeker (disambiguation)
