= The Sands of Time (Hoeye novel) =

2001 novel by Michael Hoeye

- 2001 first edition
- Author: Michael Hoeye
- Language: English
- Series: Hermux Tantamoq Adventures
- Genre: Children's novel
- Publisher: Speak, a division of Penguin Putnam
- Publication date: August 2001
- Publication place: United States
- Media type: Print (Hardback & Paperback)
- Pages: 277 pp
- ISBN: 0-9675111-2-7
- OCLC: 47969799
- LC Class: PZ7.H67148 San 2001
- Preceded by: Time Stops for No Mouse
- Followed by: No Time Like Show Time

The Sands of Time is a children's fantasy novel by American writer Michael Hoeye. The Sands of Time is the second in the Hermux Tantamoq series beginning with Time Stops for No Mouse, followed by No Time Like Show Time, and Time to Smell the Roses. In each one Hermux Tantamoq, mouse, watchmaker, and occasional detective, is the main character.

== Plot summary ==
At the beginning of the story, protagonist Hermux Tantamoq is approached by his father's friend, Birch Tentintrotter, to investigate whether the present-day rodent civilization was preceded, and its technology informed, by a feline civilization now obscured. Following an attempt by antagonist Hinkum Stepfitchler (the son of Birch's mentor) to discredit Birch's thesis, Hermux and pilot Linka Perflinger accompany Birch to the Western desert, where they confirm that the feline civilization existed, and that the rodent population were its slaves. They are thereupon captured by Hinkum Stepfitchler, who reveals that his family made their fortune by plagiarizing the cats' technology. In his subsequent absence, they escape, and expose his plan to the rodent society. Thereafter the ruined feline city is re-created at a rodents' museum, with all its artifacts, at a grand celebration.
