= Taqwsheblu Vi Hilbert Ethnobotanical Garden =

Botanical garden in Seattle, Washington, U.S.

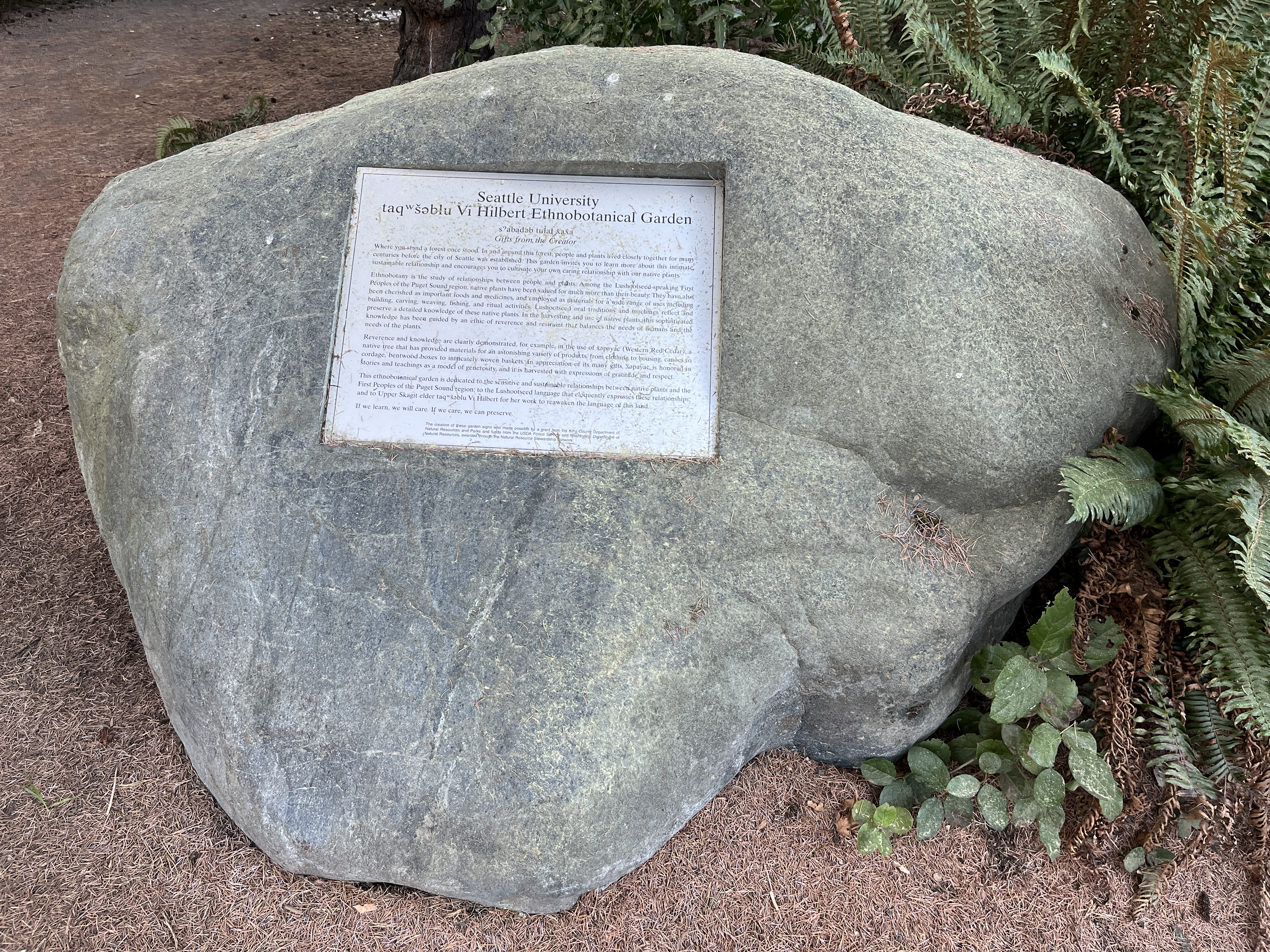
- Sign for the garden, 2022
- Interactive map of Taqwsheblu Vi Hilbert Ethnobotanical Garden
- Coordinates: 47°36′29.5″N 122°19′9″W

Taqwsheblu Vi Hilbert Ethnobotanical Garden (Lushootseed spelling taqʷšəblu; sometimes simply Vi Hilbert Ethnobotanical Garden) is a botanical garden on the Seattle University campus, in the U.S. state of Washington. The garden is named after Vi Hilbert, a Native American tribal elder of the Upper Skagit, and commemorates her work to document and preserve the Lushootseed language.

== Description ==
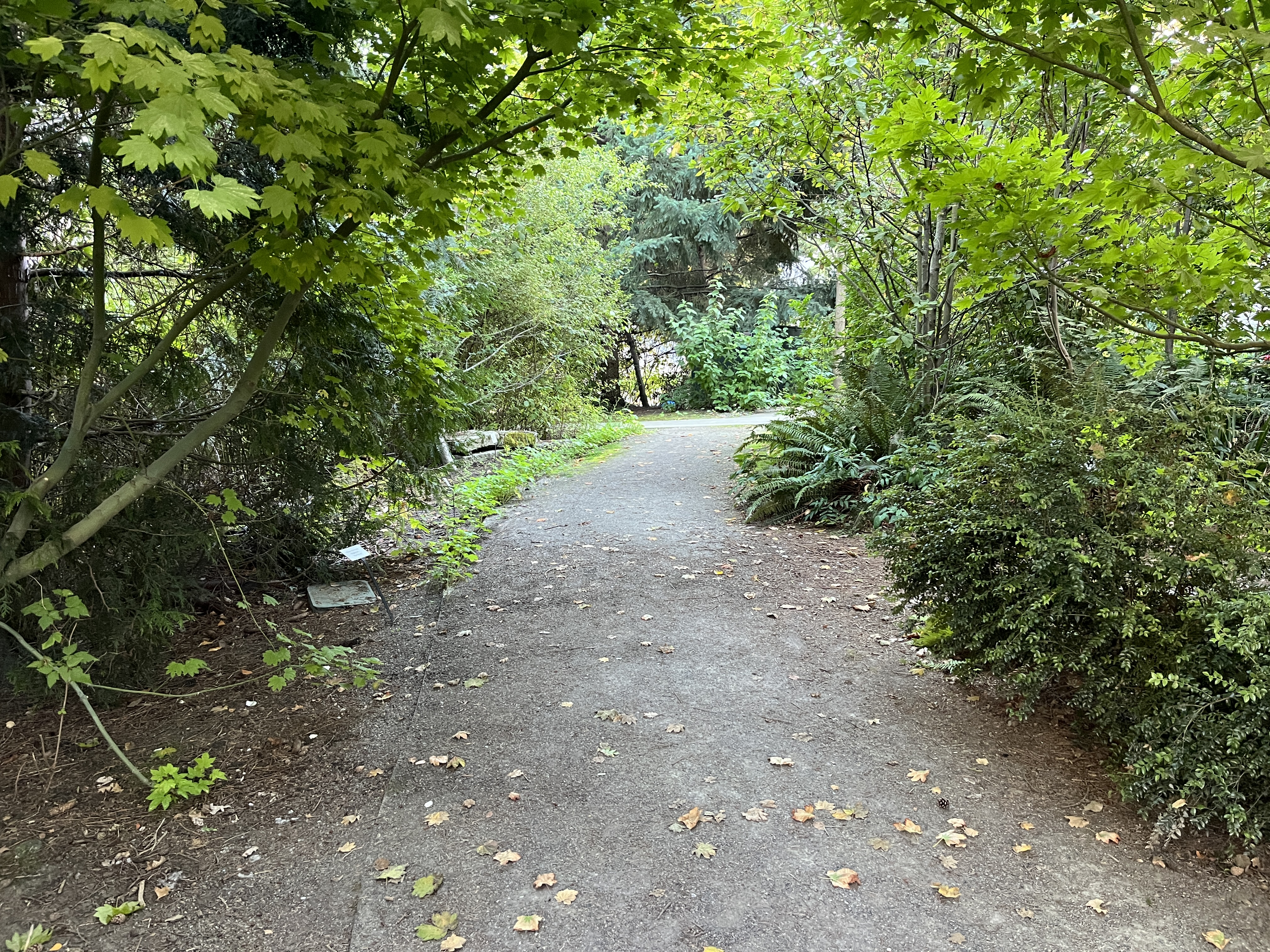
Garden trail in 2022

According to Seattle University, the garden is among several on campus which "[showcase] the relationship between Lushootseed language-speaking peoples and the native plants of our southern Salish Sea region".

Curbed's 2019 list of sixteen "breathtaking" botanical gardens in the Seattle metropolitan area said the garden "highlights plants important to First Peoples of the Puget Sound region—whether, sacred, culinary, utility, or a combination".

Signs throughout the garden display plant names in Lushootseed, along with information about local Indigenous peoples' relationship with them.
