= Groundskeeping (novel) =

2022 novel by Lee Cole

- Author: Lee Cole
- Audio read by: Michael Crouch
- Language: English
- Genre: Fiction
- Publisher: Alfred A. Knopf
- Publication date: March 1, 2022
- Publication place: United States
- Media type: Print (hardcover), e-book, audio
- Pages: 336
- ISBN: 978-0-593-32050-1

Groundskeeping is a 2022 novel by American author Lee Cole. His debut novel, it was published by Alfred A. Knopf on March 1, 2022.

== Plot ==
In the fall of 2016, just before the US presidential election, 28-year-old aspiring writer Owen Callahan has recently moved back to his home state of Kentucky, near Louisville, where he lives with his grandfather and uncle. He works as a groundskeeper at Ashby College, and in exchange is allowed to enroll in a creative writing workshop. He meets Princeton-educated writer-in-residence Alma Hazdic, 26, who grew up in the affluent Virginia suburbs and comes from a family of Bosnian Muslim refugees, and they begin a relationship.

== Background ==
Cole, a native Kentuckian, has said that the novel is not autobiographical, but that there are elements of his life present in it. He was born in Paducah, where some of the novel takes place, and spent time in Louisville, where the majority of it is set. Cole was the first in his family to attend college. He started out at the University of Kentucky, then the University of Missouri–St. Louis, and graduated from the University of Louisville. He attended the Iowa Writers' Workshop from 2017 to 2019. The character of Pop is based on Cole's own grandfather, Creston Shelton, to whom the novel is dedicated.

== Reception ==
Hamilton Cain of The New York Times called Groundskeeping an "exacting, beautifully textured debut novel." Wendy Smith of The Washington Post called it "satisfyingly rich in themes and details... very fine work indeed from an exciting new voice." The novel was selected by Jenna Bush Hager for her Today show book club.
