= Arwen Elys Dayton =

Speculative fiction writer

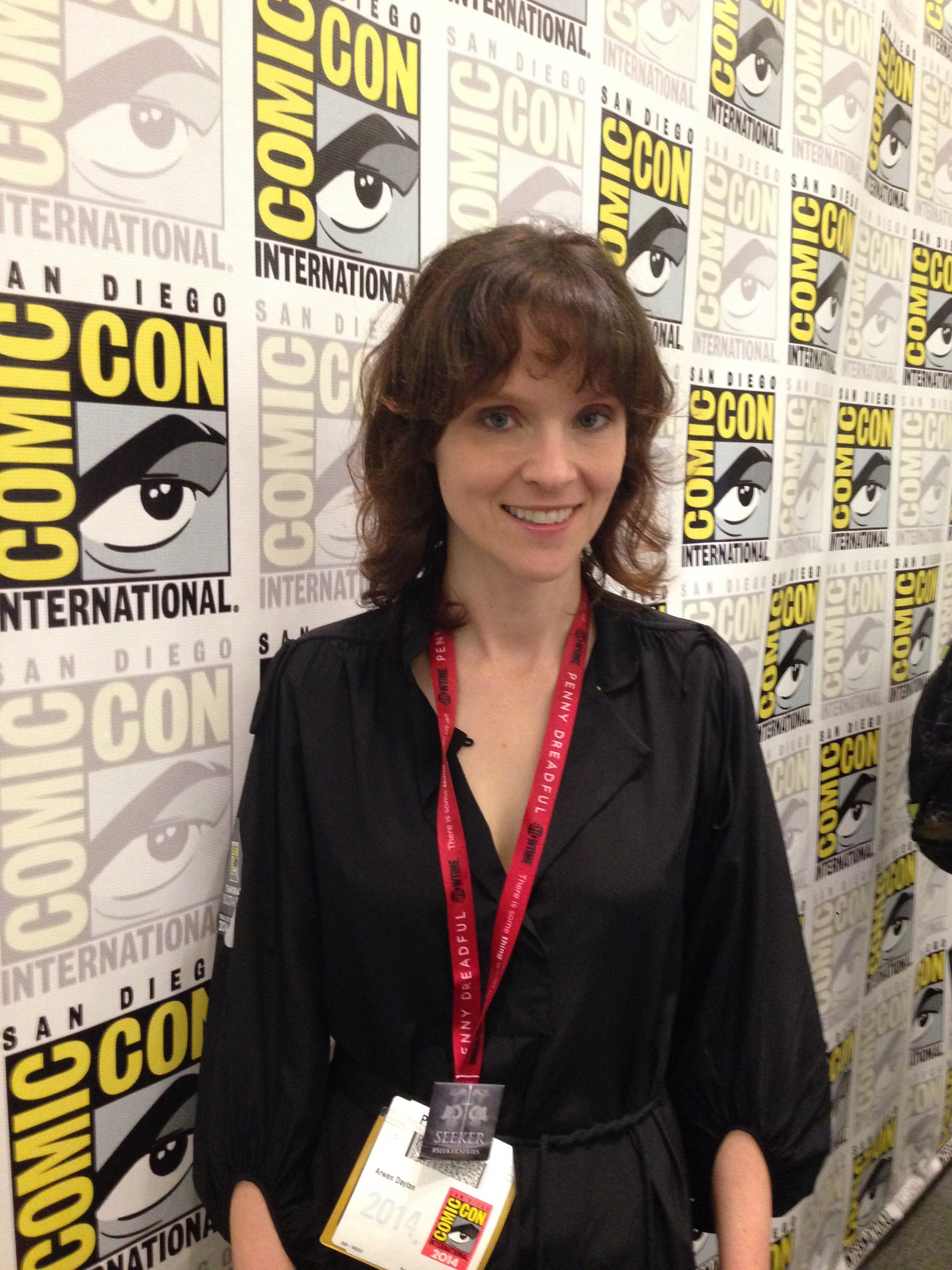
- Arwen Elys Dayton at San Diego Comic-Con, 2014.
- Occupation: Novelist
- Notable work: Seeker; Stronger, Faster, and More Beautiful
- Spouse: Sky Dayton
- Website: www.arwenelysdayton.com

Arwen Elys Dayton is an American author of science fiction, fantasy and speculative fiction. The author of seven published works, she is best known for her award-winning novel Stronger, Faster, and More Beautiful and for her Seeker trilogy. Her 2012 novel Resurrection was an Amazon.com Kindle best seller, reaching #1 and #2 on national and international sales charts. The rights to her 2015 novel Seeker were purchased by Columbia Pictures in 2013. Her 2018 novel, Stronger, Faster, and More Beautiful, was cited by Tom Shippey of The Wall Street Journal as one of the best science fiction novels of 2018. She is married to tech entrepreneur Sky Dayton and lives in Oregon's Willamette Valley.

== Background ==
Dayton was named Arwen after an elf in The Lord of the Rings. She began writing around the age of 7 or 8, when her teacher asked her to write a one-page story. As a child, she enjoyed reading adventure and fantasy stories, and at the age of 8 envisaged a story about a prince arriving on a spaceship from another planet to rescue his little sister; several elements of her original idea weaved their way into her novel many years later, Resurrection. At the age of 12, she read the book The King Must Die, by Mary Renault, which had a major impact on the budding writer, describing it as "having everything, Greek mythology brought into real life... heroes, gods, humans, love, romance, adventure".

After graduating from high school at 16, Dayton worked as a tutor for a year in Europe. She returned to the US to attend Stanford University, but instead took a job as a magazine article writer. Her articles led to her being hired as a writer on the PBS show The Eddie Files.

Dayton is married to tech entrepreneur, Sky Dayton, and they live on the West Coast with their three children. With her husband she has invested in startups such as digital data studio Fresno in 2017.

== Career ==
While working as a writer for the PBS show The Eddie Files, Dayton began working on her first novel, Sovereign's Hold, which was published by Windstorm in 2000. According to Library Journal, "Dayton's first novel features intriguing characters and a plot worthy of the best space operas".

Dayton first came to widespread attention with her novel Resurrection, set against the backdrop of ancient Egypt, fusing ancient Egyptian history and archaeology with the possibility of advanced civilizations in a nearby galaxy.” It features the character of Pruitt, a lone warrior fighting to save her people from extermination, who must journey across time and the stars to find a lost technology. Reviewer Lisa DuMond wrote: "This tale of planets, civilizations, and alternate histories offers some theories you probably never considered. It's a look into past, present, and future that seems strangely... probable." Though she described the "flashbacks, flashforwards, several flashsideways" as "unsettling", she concluded that it was an "engaging story, intriguing speculation, and a lively style". The novel was published by Amazon's 47North, and became a Kindle bestseller after hitting #2 on the overall charts.

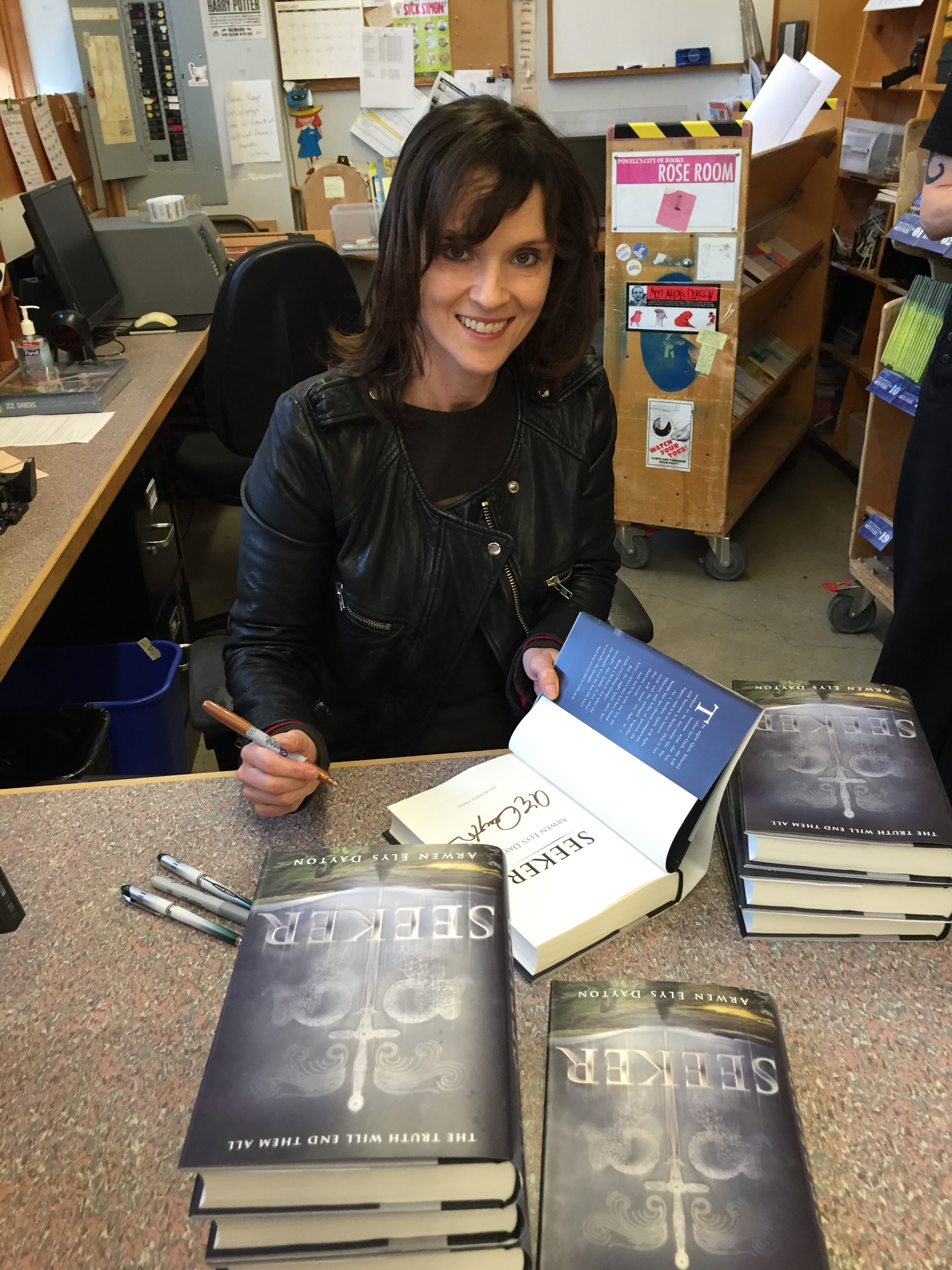
Dayton at a Seeker book signing at Powell's Books in Portland, Oregon in 2015

In February 2015, Dayton released the novel Seeker, a fantasy novel set in a shadowy, dystopian future. It follows three young apprentices: Quin, John and Shinobu, as they undergo training to become the "Seeker", tasked with righting the wrongs of the world. Dayton extensively researched the novel in Scotland, where the first third of the story is set, and stated that "when I drive through smaller villages and through open land, I know I'm seeing Scotland much as it was hundreds of years ago, and much as it will be in times to come". USA Today noted the different responses of the three characters to the "disillusionment experienced when lies of childhood are revealed as frightening truths of a really messed-up adult reality". Publishers Weekly called Seeker a "powerful beginning to a complex family saga". However, the reviewer for The Guardian was less enthusiastic, believing that the second half of the novel was stronger. Teen Vogue included the novel in their 2015 "13 YA Debuts to Have on Your Radar This Year" list. As early as 2013, it was announced that Columbia Pictures had purchased the rights to the novel and that Mark Gordon was attached to produce a film adaptation. President of production, Hannah Minghella, stated: "The best science fiction and fantasy stories are a metaphor for a grounded universal truth and Arwen perfectly captures the emotionally complex awakening all young people have that the world is not black and white, parents are not perfect and ultimately we all have to be Seekers of our own truth".

In November 2015, Dayton released an e-Novella entitled The Young Dread, revolving around a character who was a child in the 1400s but is still alive today, and aged only into a teen. In 2016, Penguin Random House published Traveler, the sequel to Seeker. According to Isabella Biedenharn of Entertainment Weekly magazine: "Traveler continues the story of Quin Kincaid, a Seeker who, on the night of her Oath, learned that her family's legacy is not quite what it seemed". The third book in the series, Disruptor, was published in 2017. Booklist wrote, "Readers of the first two volumes will find their long-awaited conclusion here, and Dayton will have found fans for life." Teen Reads notes that Disruptor is written from different perspectives and even reveals the thoughts of secondary characters such as Maud, Dex and Nott. They wrote that "some chapters are short yet powerful, which leave the reader in complete suspense and anticipation".

In December 2018, Dayton released Stronger, Faster, and More Beautiful, which explores the ethical question of how far humans will go in their pursuit of physical perfection. Her interest in genetic engineering began in 2009 when she read an article in The New Yorker about synthetic biology and the scientists who were fusing together body parts to create new life. Sadie Trombetta of Bustle described the book as "powerful, poignant", writing: "six interconnected narratives come together to tell a larger story about a distant future where science and technology have made it possible to attain the kind of perfection humans have always craved. It is a twisted and sometimes terrifying exploration of the incredible possibilities of genetic manipulation and life extension that begs an important question: How far are we willing to go to become the perfect human specimen, and at what point does that perfection start to interfere with our humanity?" In a starred review, book review magazine Kirkus Reviews wrote that the book was "imaginative and incisive ... [and] asks readers to ponder what makes us human and if we’ll know when we’ve crossed the line, becoming something else." Publishers Weekly also gave the book a starred review, stating that "Dayton's brilliant collection of stories is best described as a scientific Twilight Zone". In the UK, the Financial Times wrote of the book, "There's some lovely writing from Dayton, especially her first-person narratives, and the thought-provoking ideas are grounded in warm, credible characterisation." Tom Shippey of The Wall Street Journal cited the book as one of the best science fiction novels of 2018, while Constance Grady of Vox named it one of the 16 best books of 2018.

In November 2024, Dayton joined production company Getaway Entertainment as a co-founder and in September 2025, her feature screenplay Nice People went into production in Newfoundland, Canada.

== Bibliography ==
- Sovereign's Hold (June 2000)
- Resurrection (January 2012)
- Stronger, Faster, and More Beautiful (December 2018)

=== The Seeker series ===
- Seeker – Book 1 (February 2015)
- Traveler – Book 2 (January 2016)
- Disruptor – Book 3 (February 2017)
- The Young Dread: A Seeker Novella (November 2015)
