= Seeker (series) =

Science fiction novels by Arwen Elys Dayton

- Three full-length novels in the Seeker collection
- Seeker (2015); The Young Dread: A Seeker Novella (2015); Traveler (2016); Disruptor (2017)
- Author: Arwen Elys Dayton
- Country: United States
- Genre: Young adult fiction, Magic realism
- Publisher: Delacorte Press
- Published: 2015-2017
- No. of books: 4

The Seeker series of novels is a 2015-2017 science fiction body of work by American author Arwen Elys Dayton, beginning with the eponymous Seeker title, a novella, and two other full-length books. They share the story of a female teenage mercenary named Quin Kincaid. Author Dayton quickly followed Seeker later in 2015 with the novella The Young Dread, which focuses on a secretive young girl Maud. The two remaining book-length novels, Traveler (2016) and Disruptor (2017), completed the trilogy by following Quin’s complicated journey with her best friend Shinobu, her to-be enemy John, and the Young Dread who awakes within the stream of time to challenge the Seekers.

== Summaries of each book ==
The Seeker series of novels is set in a near-future version of our world, where Seekers are mercenaries who are trained and sworn to protect the good and to fight evil, though they haven’t been told the entire truth throughout their training.

=== Seeker ===
The first book in the series, Seeker, opens in Scotland, which author Dayton researched extensively, stating "when I drive through smaller villages and through open land, I know I'm seeing Scotland much as it was hundreds of years ago, and much as it will be in times to come". The story follows three young apprentices: Quin Kincaid, Shinobu, and John, as they undergo training to become the "Seeker", to right the wrongs of the world. After spending most of her life training to become a Seeker, Quin realizes, upon taking her oath, that she had never been given the full truth about her new role. Dayton withholds information from the reader, revealing only "hints and a bit of foreshadowing" that Quin has been trained as an assassin, to work for her "brutal, manipulative father". After Scotland, the setting jumps to Hong Kong, where Quin explores therapeutic amnesia, while Shinobu takes up salvage diving and falls into drug use. John strives to acquire his family’s "athame", a device that allows a Seeker to cut through reality.

USA Today noted the different responses of the three characters to the "disillusionment experienced when lies of childhood are revealed as frightening truths of a really messed-up adult reality". Publishers Weekly called Seeker a "powerful beginning to a complex family saga", while Teen Vogue included the novel in its 2015 "13 YA Debuts to Have on Your Radar This Year" list. In 2013, only a week after the publishing deal had been signed with Dayton for high six-figures by Delacorte Press, Columbia Pictures announced it had purchased the film rights to the novel and that Mark Gordon was attached to produce any cinematic adaptation. President of production Hannah Minghella stated, "The best science fiction and fantasy stories are a metaphor for a grounded universal truth, and Arwen perfectly captures the emotionally complex awakening all young people have that the world is not black and white, parents are not perfect, and ultimately we all have to be Seekers of our own truth".

=== The Young Dread ===
Only months after the publication of Seeker, Dayton followed with a 100-page novella about Maud, otherwise known as the Young Dread, a character who appears in the first book. It jumps centuries earlier to cover Maud’s training before she freezes in time until reawakening in Quin Kincaid’s timeline, aged only into a teen.

=== Traveler ===
In 2016, Dayton’s second full-length book in the series, Traveler, was published by Ember, as a follow-up to Seeker. According to Isabella Biedenharn of Entertainment Weekly magazine: "Traveler continues the story of Quin Kincaid, a Seeker who, on the night of her Oath, learned that her family's legacy is not quite what it seemed".

=== Disruptor ===
Dayton’s third full-length book in the series, Disruptor, was published in 2017 by Delacorte Press, as a follow-up to Traveler. Lead character Quin returns, exploring a peculiar nexus outside the dimensions of our world known as There. Booklist noted that "readers of the first two volumes will find their long-awaited conclusion here, and Dayton will have found fans for life."
