= Jeff Zentner =

American author

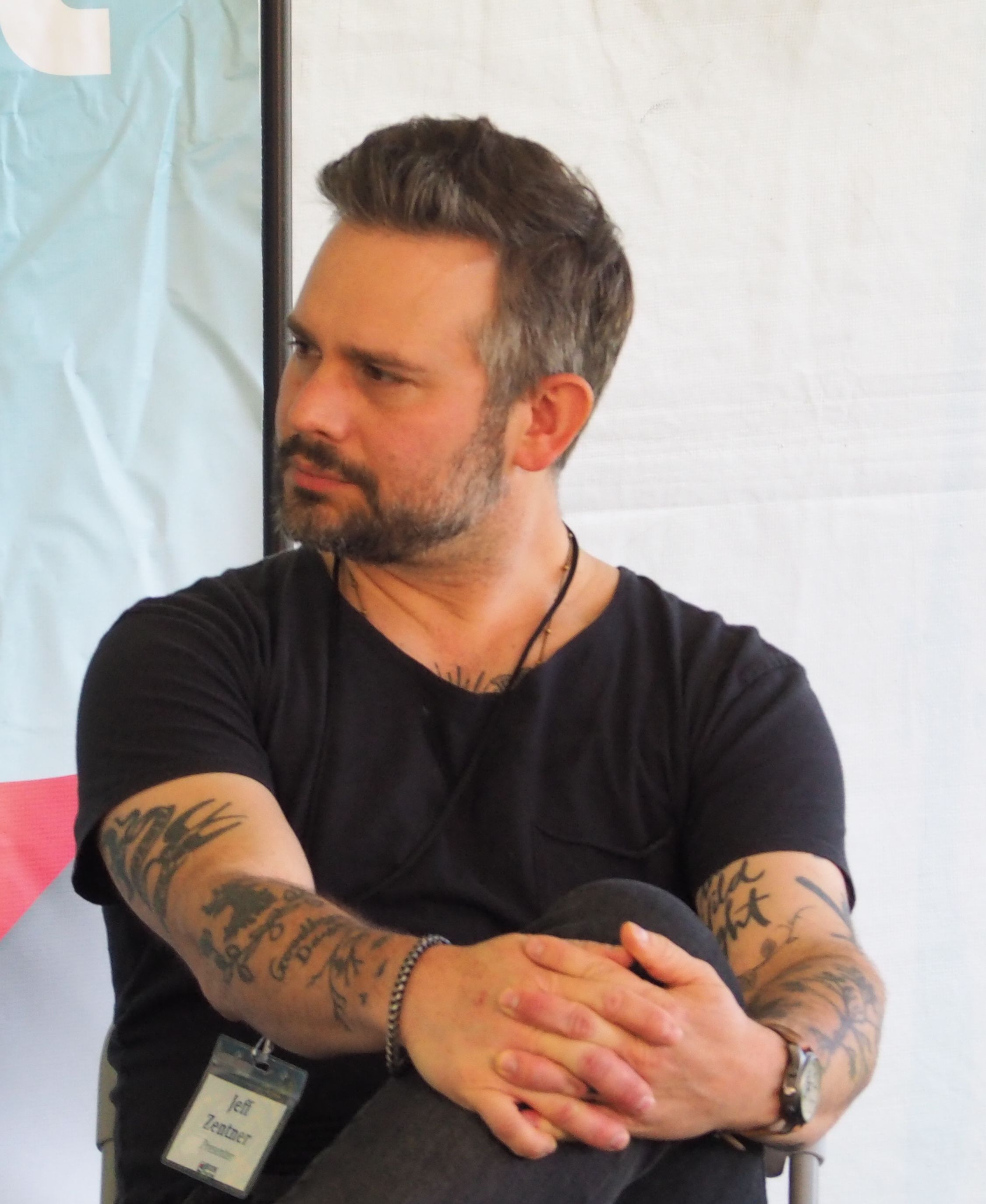
- Occupation: writer
- Writing career
- Genre: Young adult, adult fiction
- Notable awards: William C. Morris YA Debut Award (2017); Amelia Elizabeth Walden Award (2017, 2022)
- Website: jeffzentnerbooks.com

Jeff Zentner is an author of several young adult novels including The Serpent King and In the Wild Light. His adult novel Colton Gentry’s Third Act was released on April 30, 2024.

== Biography ==
Before focusing on writing, Zentner worked as a singer-songwriter, releasing three albums as a solo artist and two with a band. Additionally, he has recorded music with Nick Cave, Debbie Harry, and Iggy Pop. In his mid-30s, he turned his creative efforts toward creative writing.

Zentner presently lives in Nashville, Tennessee and works full-time as a lawyer in addition to writing

== Awards and honors ==
Publishers Weekly named Zentner a PW Flying Start in 2016.

The Serpent King received starred reviews from Kirkus Reviews, Publishers Weekly, and Shelf Awareness. Hudson Booksellers, Publishers Weekly, and Shelf Awareness named it one of the best teen novels of 2016. Goodbye Days received a starred review from Publishers Weekly and Shelf Awareness. The Southern Independent Booksellers Alliance included Rayne & Delilah's Midnite Matinee on their 2019 Winter Okra Picks. The book received starred reviews from Booklist and Publishers Weekly. In the Wild Light received starred reviews from Booklist, Kirkus Reviews, Publishers Weekly, and School Library Journal. Publishers Weekly named it one of the top ten young adult novels of 2021.

Awards for Zentner's writing
Year	Title	Award	Result	Ref.
2016	The Serpent King	Goodreads Choice Award for Debut Goodreads Author	Nominee	
2016	The Serpent King	Goodreads Choice Award for Young Adult Fiction	Nominee	
2017	The Serpent King	ALA Best Fiction for Young Adults	Top 10	
2017	The Serpent King	Amelia Elizabeth Walden Award	Winner	
2017	The Serpent King	William C. Morris YA Debut Award	Winner	
2017	Goodbye Days	AML Award for Best Young Adult Novel	Winner	
2017	Goodbye Days	Goodreads Choice Award for Young Adult Fiction	Nominee	
2018	Goodbye Days	ALA Best Fiction for Young Adults	Top 10	
2018	Goodbye Days	Amazing Audiobooks for Young Adults	Selection	
2020	Rayne & Delilah's Midnite Matinee	ALA Best Fiction for Young Adults	Selection	
2020	Rayne & Delilah's Midnite Matinee	Southern Book Prize for Children's	Finalist	
2022	In the Wild Light	Amelia Elizabeth Walden Award	Winner	
2022	In the Wild Light	ALA Best Fiction for Young Adults	Top 10	
2022	In the Wild Light	Amazing Audiobooks for Young Adults	Selection	

== Publications ==
- The Serpent King (2016)
- Goodbye Days (2017)
- Rayne & Delilah's Midnite Matinee (2019)
- In the Wild Light (2021)
- Colton Gentry's Third Act (2024)
- Sunrise Nights, co-authored with Brittany Cavallaro (2024)
