= Time Stops for No Mouse =

1999 novel by Michael Hoeye

- 2001 paperback edition
- Author: Michael Hoeye
- Language: English
- Series: The Hermux Tantamoq Adventures
- Genre: Children's novel
- Publisher: Speak, a division of Penguin Putnam
- Publication date: 1999
- Publication place: United States
- Media type: Print (Hardback & Paperback)
- Pages: 250 pp
- ISBN: 0-698-11991-6
- OCLC: 51688458
- Followed by: The Sands of Time

Time Stops for No Mouse is a children's mystery novel written by Michael Hoeye. The novel was originally self-published, then published by Speak, a division of Penguin Putnam in 1999. It was a finalist for the Book Sense "Book of the Year" award and was reprinted in 2000 and 2002. Time Stops for No Mouse is the first in the Hermux Tantamoq series, and it currently has three sequels, The Sands of Time, No Time Like Show Time and Time to Smell the Roses.

== Plot summary ==
At the beginning of the story, the mouse Hermux Tantamoq is a watchmaker in Pinchester, a Manhattan-like metropolis inhabited by rodents, birds, and mustelids. He is hired by aircraft-pilot Linka Perflinger (another mouse) to mend her wristwatch. When the watch is requested, without Linka's permission, by a criminal rat, Hermux refuses to hand it over, and later witnesses Linka's capture by similar rats, who are working on behalf of antagonist Dr. Hiril Mennus. Investigating this, Hermux learns that Mennus, in partnership with sub-antagonist Tucka Mertslin, seeks to patent a rejuvenation formula obtained by Linka's client, Dr. Turfip Dandiffer. Assisted by the mole journalist Pup Schoonagliffen (Mennus in disguise), Hermux infiltrates Mennus' clinic, but is himself captured; whereupon Mennus places Hermux and Linka in a mousetrap to die. To maintain control of Tucka Mertslin, Mennus memorizes and destroys the formula; but by an inept use thereof, reduces himself to infancy. Hermux and Linka are thereafter rescued by Dr. Dandiffer's sponsor, Ortolina Perriflot. Some days later, Hermux approaches Linka, intending to propose marriage, but finds her already engaged to Dandiffer. Later, he uses the remnant formula to restore the eyesight of his friend Mirrin Sentrill.

== Editions ==
The story was first published by the author as a two-volume set, spiral-bound card, in a limited edition of 1000. It was then taken up by Penguin Putnam, who for world-wide rights paid Hoeye what at the time was "the record sum received for a children's book".

- ISBN 0-399-23878-6 (Hardcover)
- ISBN 0-698-11991-6 (Trade paper)
