= The Hermux Tantamoq Adventures =

Book series by Michael Hoeye

- Time Stops for No Mouse (1999); The Sands of Time (2001); No Time Like Show Time (2004); Time to Smell the Roses (2007)
- Author: Michael Hoeye
- Cover artist: Chris Inns
- Genre: Children's fiction and Mystery
- Publisher: Puffin Books
- Published: 1999-2007
- No. of books: 4

The Hermux Tantamoq Adventures are a series of children's novels by Michael Hoeye which follows the story of a watchmaker mouse named Hermux Tantamoq, who becomes a detective. All of the books in the series include the word 'time' in the title.

== Distribution ==
=== Books ===
1. Time Stops for No Mouse (1999)
2. The Sands of Time (2001)
3. No Time Like Show Time (2004)
4. Time to Smell the Roses (2007)

=== Audio ===
The first three books have been made into audiobooks and were narrated by Campbell Scott.
