= Stefan Merrill Block =

American writer

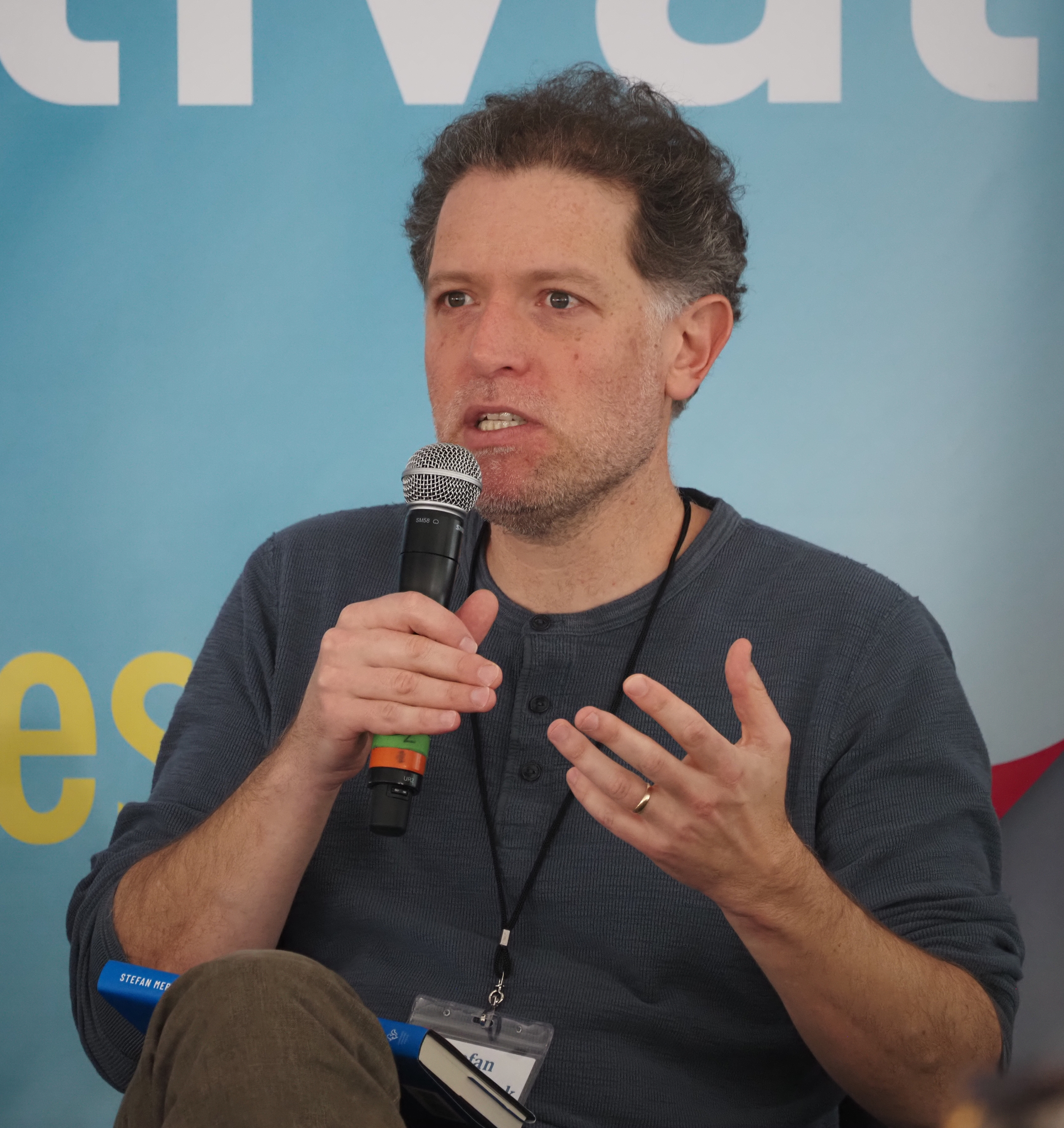
- at the 2026 Gaithersburg Book Festival
- Website: https://www.stefanmerrillblock.com

Stefan Merrill Block (born 1982) is an American writer.

== Biography ==
Stefan Merrill Block was born in Texas and currently lives in Brooklyn, NY. He graduated from Washington University in St. Louis.

He has written three novels: The Story of Forgetting, The Storm at the Door, and Oliver Loving. Hanover Square Press published his debut memoir Homeschooled in 2026, which is about his experience being homeschooled by his eccentric and controlling mother for five years.

His work appeared in The Guardian, and The Atlantic.
