= Vi Hilbert =

Native American cultural and language advocate (1918–2008)

- taqʷšəblu
- Born: July 24, 1918; Near Lyman, Washington, U.S.
- Died: December 19, 2008 (aged 90)
- Citizenship: Upper Skagit Indian Tribe and U.S.
- Spouse: Percy Woodcock (m. 1936, divorced) Bob Coy (m. 1942) Henry Donald Hilbert (m. 1945, died)
- Children: 3

Vi Hilbert (Lushootseed: taqʷšəblu; née Anderson; July 24, 1918 – December 19, 2008) was an Upper Skagit elder and conservationist of her traditional culture and of the Lushootseed language, of which she was the last fully fluent heritage speaker. She taught Lushootseed at the University of Washington for 17 years (1971–1988), where she also transcribed and translated Lushootseed recordings from the 1950s. This work is preserved in the university's audio library.

Hilbert was an enrolled member of the Upper Skagit Indian Tribe, a tribe located in Skagit County, Washington. She was named a Washington Living Treasure in 1989, and received a National Heritage Fellowship from the National Endowment for the Arts, presented by President Bill Clinton, in 1994. She co-wrote Lushootseed grammars and dictionaries, partially with linguist Thom Hess, and published books of stories, teachings, and place names related to her native region, the Puget Sound (Lushootseed: x̌ʷəlč).

== Early life and education ==
Vi Anderson was born to Charlie (Lushootseed: ʔadsəd) and Louise (tsi sqʷux̌ʷaɬ) Anderson on July 24, 1918, near Lyman, Washington (slux̌ʷ), on the Skagit River. She was the only one of their eight children to live past the age of 3. Her parents spoke Lushootseed with each other and their friends, which encouraged the young Hilbert to begin to learn the language. Her father was a fisherman, a logger, and a canoe maker, whose canoe the "Question Mark" is housed in the Smithsonian Museum Archive. Hilbert's family mainly traveled by canoe when she was a child. She went berry picking with her family during the summers, and often went fishing with her dad at night on the Skagit River for King salmon, chum, silvers, and steelhead.

The family moved frequently in search of work, which resulted in Hilbert attending 15 different schools. For a while, she attended a boarding school at Tulalip. This was a U.S. Government-run Indian residential school, which were known for their abusive treatment of students in an effort to erase their culture. A previous attendee of the Tulalip school recalled the whippings that students received for speaking in their native languages, which had the effect of causing their generation to only speak English: "Believe me, we never talked 'Indian' at the school again...I gave a talk somewhere to a group, and I explained the reason why we seldom spoke Indian: it was beaten out of us." Hilbert recalled of her own time at the school:^{:24-25}

Many people resented the discipline there. English was spoken—only—unless we were hiding in the corner there someplace talking to each other about something we didn’t like. So very few people were speaking the language, they didn’t have to enforce it anymore. They had already got it out of the generation before me.

In high school, she attended the Chemawa Indian Boarding School near Salem, Oregon. From there, she transferred to Franklin High School in Portland to get the best education she could find, while working as a domestic to support herself financially. She was nervous about attending Franklin, but credited the care and support of the school's principal, Mr. Bell, in helping her adapt. She attended the school for two years while working for $10 a month, with room and board.

== Experience in World War II ==
In an interview, Hilbert stated that she was nearly a victim of the US policy of internment of Japanese Americans; however, she was ultimately able to prove her Native American heritage.

== Career ==
Before Hilbert was paid to research and teach the Lushootseed language, she worked a variety of jobs. In Tahola, Washington, she planned out and ran a gas station and grocery store. She later worked in groceries and food service, before performing telegraphy for the Seattle Railroad School and becoming the secretary to the Director of Nursing at Seattle Children's. After training at Mr. Lee's Beauty School, she ran a hairdressing business from her home from 1960 onward.

=== Early research ===
Hilbert met Thomas M. Hess, a linguistics graduate student at the University of Washington, in 1967 and researched Lushootseed with him. At the time, the language was called Puget Salish by the academics learning about it. Hess was writing a grammar book for the language. Hess and Louise George, a Nooksack elder, had spent years meeting at George's house to transcribe Lushootseed recordings. When they came to a story told by Hilbert's mother about the Basket Ogress, George recommended they consult with Hilbert, and she began attending their meetings. Hess said that Hilbert was intrigued by his correct pronunciation of her name, as well as the writing system they were using to transcribe Lushootseed, which she learned in a month. Hilbert wrote that she was surprised during this visit at how much of the language she remembered, and at the fact that she could translate it to English. She had previously been excited to find a published book concerning part of her culture, Erna Gunther's Ethnobotany of Western Washington, and it built Hilbert's interest in researching her culture as well. She recalled that she was initially concerned she would not remember enough of Lushootseed to be able to work with it, but credited Hess for believing in her and working with her as she learned more.^{:29–30}

Hilbert began to record conversations and stories with different elders, including George. Hess taught her his orthography system and she taught him more vocabulary. In 1968, they met frequently, often with George, to analyze Hess's recordings of the stories that other elders had shared. They documented the grammar, vocabulary, and sounds of Lushootseed, and often recorded their own meetings or shared work via postcard.^{:31}

=== Teaching and research ===
In Spring 1972, Hess taught the first class at the University of Washington about Lushootseed, which Hilbert audited. Hess credited her with making the class a success, including by participating from the front row and convincing other students that they were truly learning Lushootseed, even though the teacher was white. Hess moved to Canada the next year, asking Hilbert to teach the class. She decided to in spite of her hesitations, including the fact that she had not attended college. Hess said that Hilbert felt duty-bound to the job because sharing the language would honor the people from her past and help young Native Americans. Besides taking over teaching duties, Hilbert worked with Hess to create daily language-learning lesson plans, a textbook, and a Haboo Book that shared traditional stories passed down from her elders.

Hilbert also began researching Lushootseed, feeling called to it as switulis uyayus: "Work that the Creator was wrapping around me. I was ordained to do this work. It was always there, waiting for me to do." She began receiving grants from the Melville Jacobs research fund in 1972. Hilbert spent years transcribing and translating Leon Metcalf's tape recordings from the 1950s. Metcalf was a high school music teacher then who had grown up among some Tulalip Lushootseed speakers. Using his own funds, he began recording stories and oral histories with elders to help preserve Lushootseed language and culture. Hess described Hilbert's efforts to transcribe these tapes as Herculean, because the tapes had poor quality and used vibrant language that had been lost to most speakers. She would repeatedly listen to sections of a tape and fill in words, then travel to visit other Lushootseed speakers to see what they could help transcribe. Many of Hilbert's students volunteered to help her with her research.

Hilbert and her students created the Lushootseed Newsletter, followed by Lushootseed Research in 1983. She later founded Lushootseed Press to help publish books on the language. Lushootseed Research earned grants from the National Endowment for the Humanities during the 1980s that supported her creation of a new Lushootseed dictionary with Hess and Dawn Bates, as well as Lushootseed Texts: An Introduction to Puget Salish Narrative Aesthetics, written with Crisca Bierwert.^{:34-35}

Hilbert retired from teaching at the University of Washington in 1988.

=== Post-retirement ===
Hilbert, Bruce Miller, and Marilyn Wandry advised the 2004 exhibition "Song, Story, Speech: Oral Traditions of Puget Sound’s First Peoples". The collection was curated by Barbara Brotherton for the Seattle Art Museum. Mixed media, including documentaries, songs, and stories, composed the main part of the exhibit to demonstrate the importance of oral traditions in Coast Salish history and culture.

In 2007, Hilbert wrote about the importance of writing Lushootseed using Thom Hess's orthography, based on the International Phonetic Alphabet, rather than an imprecise and older system based on the English alphabet. On behalf of the board of Lushootseed Research, she criticized the first edition of Native Seattle, by Coll Thrush, for including an atlas of place names written with the English alphabet rather than the phonetic alphabet. In the second edition of Native Seattle, Thrush revised the atlas to use the alphabet recommended by Hilbert, citing a pronunciation key from the 1994 dictionary she wrote with Dawn Bates and Hess.

In 1997, Hilbert, Bruce Miller, Pauline Hillaire, John and Edie Hottowe, Hazel Pete, and David Whitener gave the name s'gʷigʷiʔaltxʷ (House of Welcome) to a longhouse built at Evergreen College. Hilbert named the garden outside the space s'uləxw, also called the Gifts Garden. She also gave the name wǝɫǝbʔaltxʷ (Intellectual House) to a Coast Salish longhouse-style gathering space at the University of Washington. She gave Spee-pots Brian Cladoosby the Lushootseed name Spee-pots (Little Bear).

=== The Healing Heart of the First People of This Land ===
In mid-2001, Hilbert stated that one of her current goals was to create a symphony, explaining that "music is a conductor that has healing power". After 9/11, she dedicated herself to the project because she felt music was the only universal language that could help "heal a sick world". Hilbert commissioned Bruce Ruddell, a composer living in Victoria, British Columbia, to write the work. Ruddell had previously collaborated with Bill Reid, a Haida artist. Hilbert did not have money to pay Ruddell, but raised funds and convinced him that the Seattle Symphony would perform it. Hilbert commissioned the work based on two Lushootseed songs in her collection. These were a Thunder Spirit Power song, passed via Chief siʔaɬ to his descendants, who shared it with her, and a Healing song given to her by Pәtius Isadore Tom, her cousin. The symphony adapted these songs's melodies and rhythms, and included Lushootseed speech.

Hilbert named the symphony "The Healing Heart of the First People of This Land". In 2006, the Seattle Symphony premiered the work. It was performed again in the 2020s by Western Washington University, Windham Philharmonic – Vermont, the Seattle Symphony, and the University of Washington Symphony, accompanied by vocalist Adia Bowen, Hilbert's grand-niece. Jill La Pointe, Hilbert's granddaughter and senior director of Seattle University's Indigenous Peoples Institute, produced the documentary The Healing Heart of Lushootseed about the symphony.

== Collection ==
Hilbert hoped to share her archive for anyone who was interested in accessing it. She wanted to make it available via multiple locations, including one copy at the University of Washington. In 2001, Hilbert explained that she sought to share her collection with Native people "to pass on what the ancestors realized would make us strong". She also wanted to make the collection available to non-Native people, who she believed would never fully understand Lushootseed culture, and thus not be able to exploit the knowledge from the collection. She thought that sharing this knowledge with non-Native people had benefits, because "the little bit they get to learn makes them richer, and if they're living richer, it can't help but make the world a better place".

In 2005, Hilbert entrusted her collection of over 2000 recordings to the University of Washington's (UW) Ethnomusicology Archives. She knew and trusted its archivist, Laurel Sercombe, and wanted the collection to remain widely accessible to anyone who had an interest in Lushootseed culture. After Sercombe retired in 2016, the collection moved to UW Libraries management. Sercombe also digitized a portion of the collection under the title "Voices of the First People", which is accessible online. Hilbert also gave copies of her papers to the Skagit Valley College, and they are stored at the Norwood Cole Library's archives in Mount Vernon, Washington.

Hilbert's choice to leave her collection to the UW was controversial, especially for some local Native Americans. Some of the recordings are about private stories, raising questions of whether they should be shared publicly, and the university has a legacy as a colonial institution, causing debate about whether it is the right place to store these recordings. As of 2026, John Vallier, the current curator of the Ethnomusicology Archives and thus Vi Hilbert's collection, has committed to repatriating works where requested.

== Personal life ==
Hilbert was married three times. Her first marriage was to Percy Woodcock in 1936 and they lived together in Taholah, Washington. They had two children: son Denny, born in 1937, and daughter Lois, born in 1938. Denny died of meningitis in 1940, after which the couple separated and she moved to Nooksack (near Bellingham, Washington) to live with her parents.

Hilbert's second marriage was to Bob Coy in 1942 at Tulalip (near Marysville, Washington). She gave birth to son Ron in 1943.

Her third and final marriage was in 1945 to Henry Donald "Donny" Hilbert, who honorably served in World War II, surviving the attack on Pearl Harbor while aboard the USS West Virginia. Donny subsequently adopted Hilbert's children from her previous marriages. They lived in a house they built in south Seattle until 2003, when they moved to Bow, Washington. Donny preceded Vi in death.

In 1969, Hilbert had a cerebral aneurysm and underwent brain surgery and months of recovery.^{:31} She had to learn how to read and write in English and Lushootseed again. Her collaborator, Thomas Hess, said that she quickly relearned these skills. When she recovered, she decided to make Lushootseed her life's work.^{:31}

She had a son Ron (č̓adəsqidəb) Hilbert Coy and a daughter Lois (yapentuk) Dodson. Lois had a son Jay (dᶻətasəbqiʔ) and a daughter Jill (tsisqʷux̌ʷaɬ), who is named after Hilbert's mother. All of them, including Hilbert, were given their names in a ceremony led by elder Isadore (pətius) Tom in 1978.

In 1995 Hilbert's adopted granddaughter, Katie Jennings, produced a documentary about her called Traditions of the Heart. The name references a Lushootseed belief that cultural knowledge is stored in the heart.

For years, Hilbert hosted large birthday celebrations called "Coming Together Gatherings". Hundreds of people attended her four-day 83rd birthday celebration at the Swinomish Reservation. Hilbert lost most of her vision by 2001.

== Death ==
Hilbert died at her home in La Conner on the morning of December 19, 2008. She was surrounded by her family at the time of her death. The taqʷšəblu Vi Hilbert Ethnobotanical Garden, and Vi Hilbert Hall at Seattle University are named in her honor.

== Selected works ==
- Hess, Thom; Hilbert, taqʷšəblu Vi (1976–1980). Lushootseed: The Language of the Skagit, Nisqually, and Other Tribes of Puget Sound. OCLC 03358300.
- Hilbert, taqʷšəblu Vi; Shelton, Chief William; Moses, Harry; Solomon, Dora; Williams, Lucy; Sampson Peter, Susie; Sam, Hagan; Kanim, Jerry (1980). Yəhaʷ. OCLC 1592598516.
- Hilbert, taqʷšəblu Vi (1985). Haboo: Native American Stories from Puget Sound (1st ed.). Seattle: University of Washington Press. ISBN 0295962704.
- Bates, Dawn; Hess, Thom; Hilbert, taqʷšəblu Vi (1994). Lushootseed Dictionary. Seattle: University of Washington Press. ISBN 9780295973234.
- Hilbert, taqʷšəblu Vi; Bierwert, Crisca (2001). Ways of the Lushootseed People: Ceremonies & Traditions of Northern Puget Sound First People (3rd ed.). Seattle: Lushootseed Research. OCLC 48491583.
- Waterman, T. T.; Hilbert, taqʷšəblu Vi; Miller, Jay; Zahir, Zalmai (2001). Puget Sound Geography. Federal Way: Lushootseed Press. OCLC 48688775.
