= Michael Hoeye =

American children's writer (born 1947)

Michael Hoeye (born 1947, in Los Angeles, California) is an American children's writer. He is the author of the Hermux Tantamoq Adventures, a series of children's mystery novels about a watchmaker mouse.

Hoeye has been variously a farmer, fashion photographer, and high-school teacher. He and his wife, Martha, live in a historic stone cottage in Oak Grove, Oregon, U.S.A., together with nine large oak trees, six even larger fir trees, and a large cast of squirrels, woodpeckers and other birds. He has also taught at Marylhurst University.

== Books ==
- Time Stops for No Mouse (1999)
- The Sands of Time (2001)
- No Time Like Show Time (2004)
- Time to Smell the Roses (2007)
