= Stronger, Faster, and More Beautiful =

2018 scifi novel by Arwen Elys Dayton

- Author: Arwen Elys Dayton
- Language: English
- Genre: Science fiction, Young adult fiction, Fiction
- Publisher: Delacorte Press
- Publication date: December 4, 2018
- Publication place: United States of America
- Pages: 384
- ISBN: 978-0525580959

Stronger, Faster and More Beautiful is a 2018 science fiction novel by Arwen Elys Dayton. It explores the ethical question of how far humans will go in their pursuit of physical perfection. It was well received critically, with Tom Shippey of the Wall Street Journal citing it as one of the best science fiction novels of 2018, and has won a number of awards.

== Background ==
At eleven years old, Dayton watched a news story about a girl of the same age who refused medical treatment for a fatal but curable disease for religion reasons. She describes the "push and pull" of her feelings of the situation as the "touchstones" in writing the novel, professing to want to "paint myself into corners that felt just like that one. Or worse."

Dayton's interest in genetic engineering began in 2009 when she read an article in The New Yorker about synthetic biology and the scientists who were fusing together body parts to create new life. She stated in an interview: "My obsession eventually grew into Stronger, Faster, and More Beautiful. But while the novel will make you think about the real scientific leaps that are happening right now, at its core it’s a series of intimate stories: Now that we can alter the course of our own evolution, how will we as a species evolve? And what will it be like to grow up, to fall in and out of love, to discover who you are, when the very essence of 'you' may be changing? Over the years read hundreds of articles and conducted numerous interviews with different researchers, including one researcher who was working to engineer mosquitoes so they couldn’t carry malaria.

== Plot ==
Stronger, Faster, and More Beautiful is composed of six interrelated stories, each set farther into the future than the last, and covering in all a time period of perhaps 150 years. The novel begins “a few years from now” with Evan and Julia Weary, semi-identical twins facing a dramatic choice about their own survival. It continues with Ludmilla, a girl who must conceal the extent to which her body has been rebuilt as prejudice against altered humans is on the rise.

Alexios is introduced as a boy whose embryonic genetic modifications were intended to provide intelligence and a successful life. Instead, his body developed physical deformities, and his intelligence is directed toward creating anagrams and solving puzzles about the world around him. Alexios has been modified with dolphin skin cells to live underwater, where he oversees manatees growing human organs for transplant.

Everywhere in the world, such advances are changing the face of humanity. “As genetic manipulation accelerates beyond cosmetic enhancements and lifesaving surgeries, animal and plant genes are modified, then used to modify human beings. Limbs can be added and the mortally ill frozen until their ailments are curable. For-profit enterprises, in the U.S. especially, compete in a laissez-faire free-for-all,” according to Kirkus Reviews.

Eventually we meet Luck and Starlock, non-modified humans (known as “Protos”) who are kept on a reservation in the Colorado mountains. Humans outside their reservation have been so altered that they are, in many cases, nearly unrecognizable. When a diseases strikes these “modern” humans, the Protos must venture off the reservation and take up the reins of humanity.

== Characters ==
- Evan Weary—one half of a set of semi-identical twins both of whom are dying. His twin sister has lapsed into a vegetative state, and Evan must come to terms with the doctors’ plan to harvest her organs to give him a second chance at life.
- Ludmilla—a high school girl hiding the degree to which her body has been rebuilt after a terrible car accident.
- Elise Tadd—the daughter of the Reverend Tad Tadd, and one of the first casualties in the Rev. Tadd's dramatic change of outlook regarding human modification.
- Alexios—a young boy of high intelligence and low social skills whose body has been modified so that he can live primarily underwater. He works in a sea paddock of the coast of Greece where he wrangles the manatees that are being raised to produce human organs for transplant.
- Jake—a wealthy young man dying of cancer. Jake's story begins in the Santa Barbara of the near future, but after his fatal cancer diagnosis, he chooses to be cryogenically frozen and woken when his disease can be cured. Many decades later, Russia invades Estonia (where Jake and hundreds of others are frozen). Jake is woken and his body is dramatically and painfully modified with durable parts, and he and others are shipped off to mine platinum from the asteroid belt. The section of the book titled “California” traces Jake's escape and return to Earth.
- Luck—a girl living on a reservation in Colorado where unaltered humans (known as "Protos") are kept as a reservoir of genetic traits in the section of the book titled “Curiosities.” With a boy called Starlock, Luck leaves the “Rez” to seek out the source of the strange disease that has afflicted modified humans.
- The Reverend Tad Tadd—a charismatic preacher who at first is adamantly opposed to making changes to the natural human body but later has a change of heart. Reverend Tadd is the only character who appears in every section of the novel (his daughter Elsie appears in three of the six). Eventually Rev. Tadd becomes the leader of a genetic revolution that changes the face of humanity, and he provides connective tissue as the novel moves farther into the future.

== Reception ==
Tom Shippey of the Wall Street Journal cited the book as one of the best science fiction novels of 2018, while Constance Grady of Vox named it one of the 16 best books of 2018. The book was chosen by Kirkus Reviews for its Best YA Science Fiction of 2018. It is a Hal Clement Notable book and a winner of the Westchester Fiction Award and was given starred reviews by five literary journals.

Sadie Trombetta of Bustle described the book as "powerful, poignant", writing: "six interconnected narratives come together to tell a larger story about a distant future where science and technology have made it possible to attain the kind of perfection humans have always craved. It is a twisted and sometimes terrifying exploration of the incredible possibilities of genetic manipulation and life extension that begs an important question: How far are we willing to go to become the perfect human specimen, and at what point does that perfection start to interfere with our humanity?" The Orange County Register called it a "mind-bending collection" which will "leave you with many questions to ponder". In a starred review, Kirkus wrote that the book was "imaginative and incisive ... [and] asks readers to ponder what makes us human and if we’ll know when we’ve crossed the line, becoming something else." Publishers’ Weekly also gave the book a starred review, stating that "Dayton’s brilliant collection of stories is best described as a scientific Twilight Zone". Eric Smith of Paste magazine described the book as a "thrilling read that explores an exciting and terrifying near-future" and an "extraordinary work [which] explores the amazing possibilities of genetic manipulation and life extension, as well as the ethical quandaries that will arise with these advance", with results ranging from the "heavenly to the monstrous". In the UK, the Financial Times noted that "the thought-provoking ideas are grounded in warm, credible characterisation."

== Awards and honors ==
- Westchester Fiction Award 2020
- YALSA Best Fiction for Young Adults 2020
- YALSA Amazing Audiobook for Young Adults 2020
- AudioFile Earphones Award 2019
- Hal Clement Notable Young Adults Book 2019
- Oregon Spirit Book Award Honor Book 2018
- Kirkus Best YA Science Fiction of 2018
- Wall Street Journal Science Fiction: Best of 2018
