= See You in the Cosmos =

2017 juvenile novel by Jack Cheng

- First edition cover
- Author: Jack Cheng
- Translators: Dominique Kugler (French); Carlos Gracia (Spanish); Bernadette Ott (German)
- Cover artist: Jason Henry
- Language: English
- Genre: Bildungsroman, juvenile
- Set in: United States
- Publisher: Dial Books (US); Puffin Books (UK)
- Publication date: February 18, 2017
- Publication place: United States
- Media type: Paperback, hardback, Audio CD, e-book
- Pages: 320
- ISBN: 978-0-399-18638-7 (paperback)
- OCLC: 1077591862
- Dewey Decimal: 813.6

See You in the Cosmos is a 2017 epistolary Bildungsroman novel by Chinese-American author Jack Cheng. It is his second book, and his first for children. Written as transcription, the story follows astronomy-loving pre-teen Alex Petroski as he embarks on a journey to understand the life of his late father and records the journey in notes on his iPod to launch into space.

Cheng composed the initial idea for the novel in 2012, after seeing a photo of the Pale Blue Dot, and was further inspired by a road trip he took in 2013. Although it was published as children's literature, the book handles themes including sex, violence, and mental illness. The novel was received positively, and won or was nominated for several accolades. Alex's characterization were praised, with the narrative style getting more mixed reviews.

== Background ==
Jack (born Yuan) Cheng was born in Shanghai, China, in around 1984, and immigrated to Troy, Michigan, when he was five, with his younger brother. After a failed attempt to enter the University of Michigan Business School, he attended classes about communications, and went to New York City in 1998 for an advertising internship. He also became a copywriter there. Feeling that he "was losing this artistic, entrepreneurial drive", he moved to the freelance industry in late 2008.

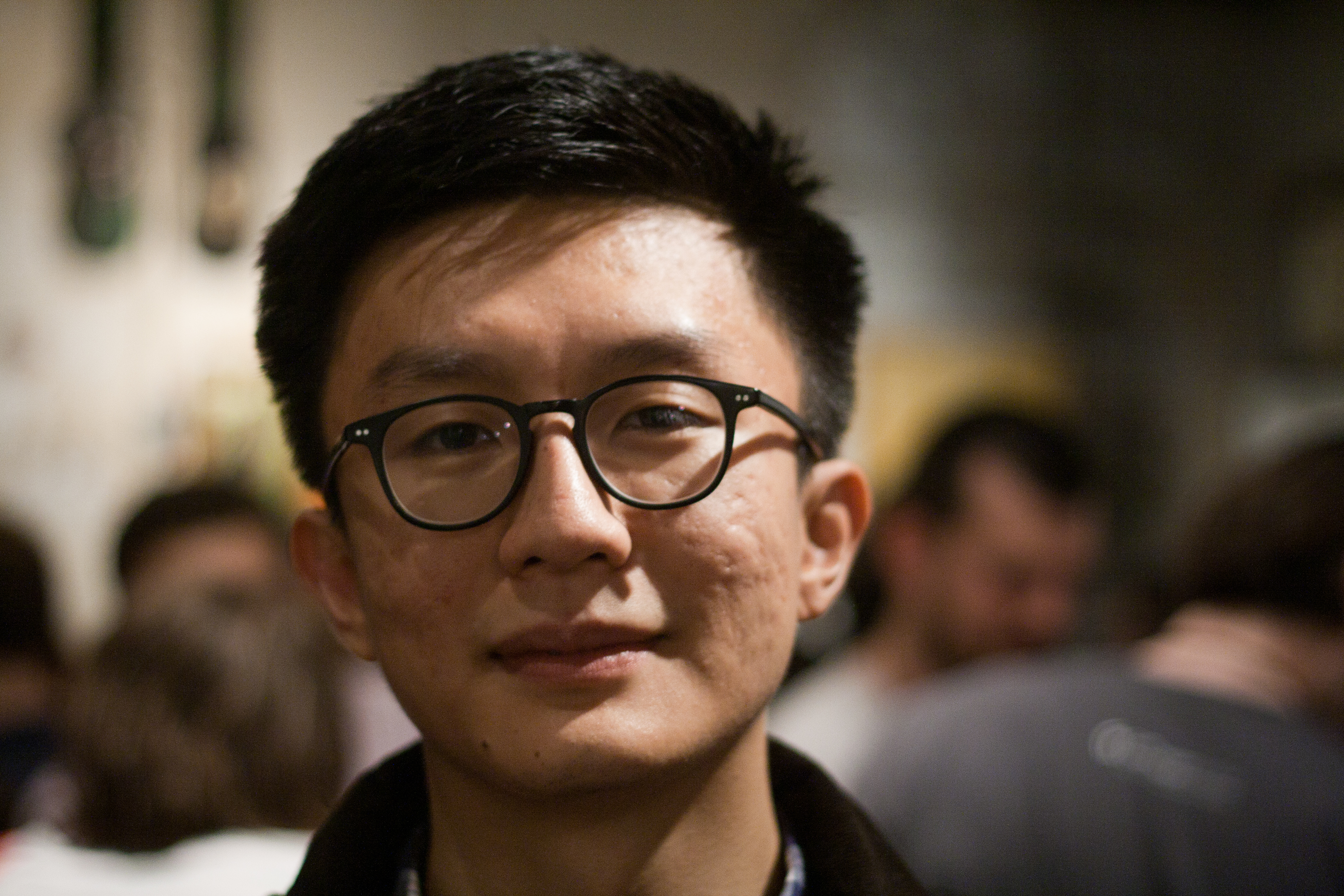
Cheng, pictured in October 2011 at Cobble Hill, Brooklyn

In 2013, after releasing his debut novel These Days, a romance novel based on Cheng's experience as a Midwestern tech worker based in New York, he started writing See You in the Cosmos. He got the idea for the novel in 2012 at his parents' house during a Thanksgiving gathering. His brother's room had Pale Blue Dot on his shelf. Seeing the photograph reminded him of an episode of Radiolab about the photograph. The next day, he woke up with the idea of the novel in his head and worked on it immediately. He also cited "ambient sound" as one of the bases of the story. Cheng recalled that part of the novel was based on a road trip he took in the Southwestern United States in mid-2013, where he mimicked his late father who once took a Greyhound Lines service from Los Angeles to Detroit, wanting to know the full story of his family "and how I came to be where I am".

Cheng researched topics of social work and child protective services, some of the main plot points of the novel, with the help of several friends. He also credited various people for "guiding me through unfamiliar territory, and for helping peel open the layers to find what the book was really about".

Although he is an Asian-American, Cheng did not create the novel based on Asian-American representation. He said: "I think we’re still at the beginning where in America the stories written by Asian Americans form only a tiny part of their experience [of growing up in America]. There are other experiences where our 'Asian-ness' doesn't necessarily have a significant role in the story, and See You in the Cosmos is one example". He hoped that minority writers dilute their idea scope to a wider range than just their ethnicity.

Throughout the writing process, Cheng did not have any insights into what the novel's target demographic would be, saying that "It was more the story seemed interesting and the character happened to be eleven". After submitting the manuscript to his literary agent, Jessica Craig, she told Cheng that it should be submitted as a young adult novel, and copyedited it to make it more friendly towards the 10–14 age range. Few further edits were done; however, there are still some: Cheng thought of the manuscript as a "lucid dream", where after witnessing it he then "go back and make sense of it". Cheng compared to, having been a juvenile book but with adult themes, with works like The Little Prince and Spirited Away, which "have these qualities of meaning one thing for a kid and then have this depth and complexity for the adult".

== Plot ==
Alexander Petroski, an 11-year-old European-Filipino-American, (Note: His father was European while his mother is Filipino.) lives in fictional Rockview, Colorado with his mother Karen. His brother, 24-year old Ronnie, is in Los Angeles being a sports agent. Alex has a puppy, Carl Sagan, named after his idol astrophysicist. He has a homemade rocket, Voyager 3, in which he plans to attach an iPod spray-painted in gold inspired by the Voyager Golden Record, where he has been busy recording various audio on, and launch it at the Southwest High-Altitude Rocket Festival (SHARF). Alex embarks with Carl to Albuquerque, New Mexico, where the festival is located. At the train, he befriends Zen buddhist Zed, who after taking a vow of silence only communicates with a chalkboard. Zed brings him to SHARF, where his roommate friend Steve will be launching a rocket which their roommate Nathan designed. Alex's rocket crashes seconds after launch, though his iPod is unscathed.

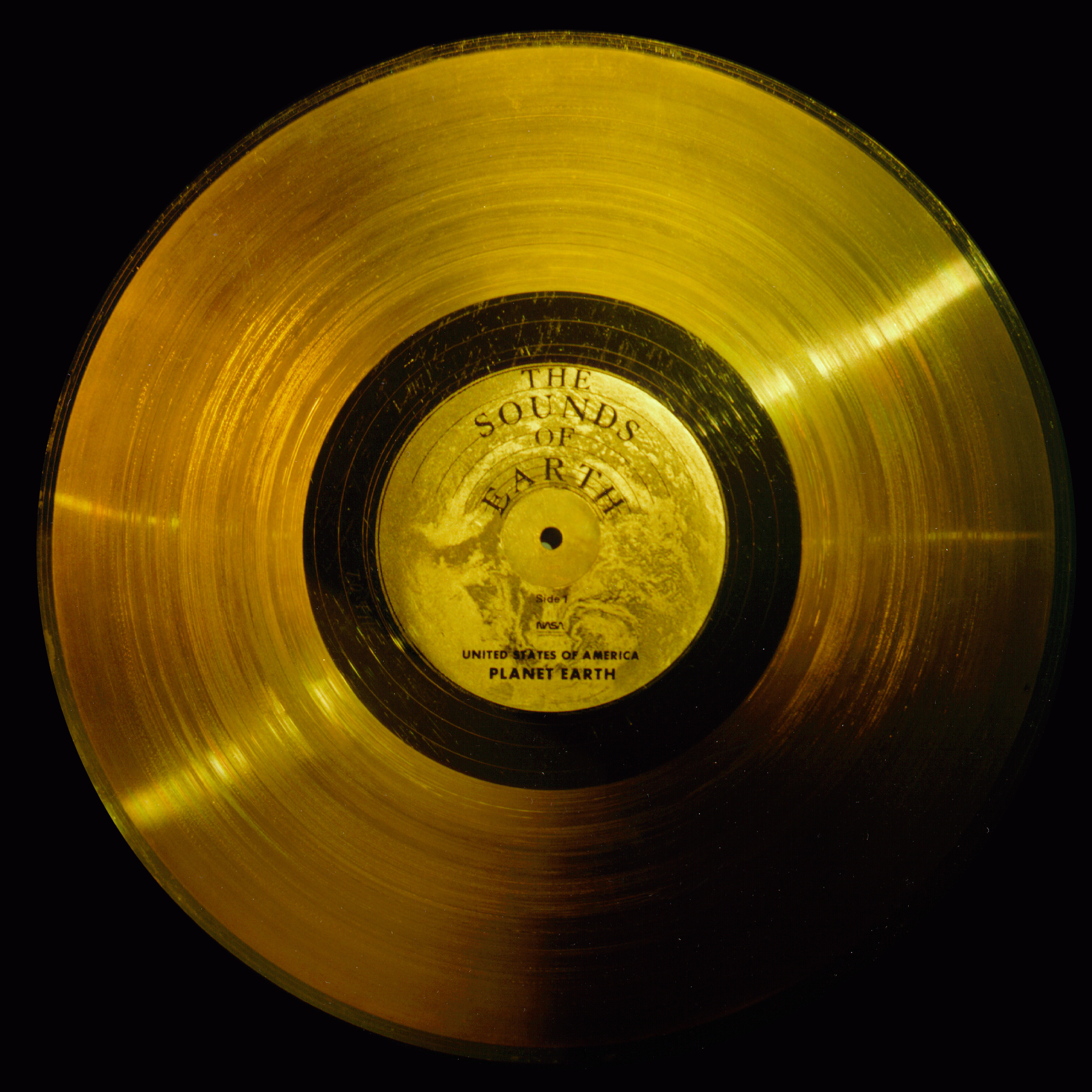
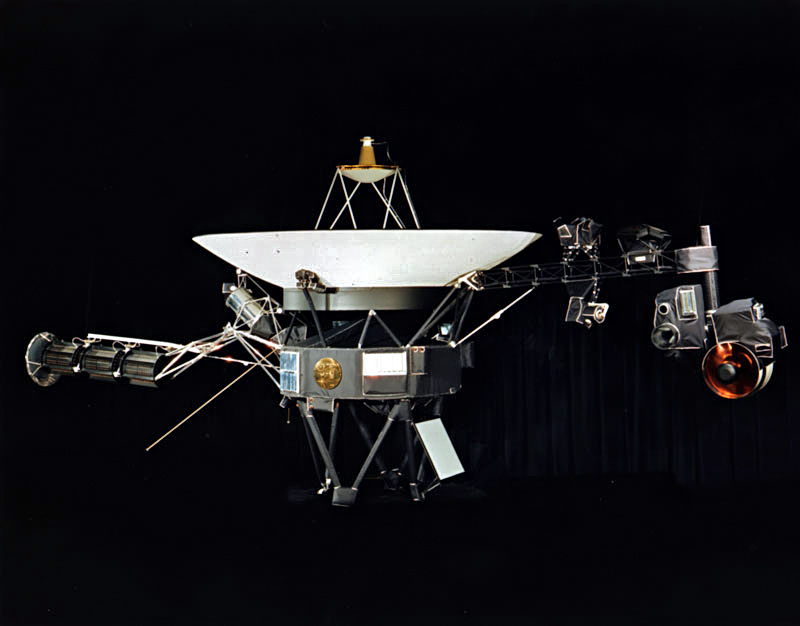
Alex recreates the Voyager Golden Record (left) as the Golden iPod, and Voyager 1 (right) as Voyager 3, succeeding Voyager 2.

Per Ancestry.com, Alex's dad Joseph David Petroski is located in Las Vegas, Nevada. Having little knowledge of him, Alex begs Steve to drive him there. At Vegas, Carl goes missing; the search for him prompts Alex to find his dad and ask for help. He asks a woman named Terra, who is revealed to be Joseph's daughter, thus Alex's half-sister. Terra was born to Joseph and his first wife Donna, and after his death, Donna moved on to another man, Howard. Alex and Terra gets along quickly, and go to Los Angeles with Zed and Steve. Steve (despite having a girlfriend) plans to confess his feelings for Terra, but seeing Nathan talking with her leads him to believe that they are in love. After punching Nathan, Steve belittles Alex, mentioning the logistical aspect of rocketry. Alex passes out, and Terra cuts Steve off from Alex.

Terra brings Alex home, where his mother is not present. Alex climbs up a ladder to look if his mother is around the house, but he collapses and is hospitalized. When Alex is discharged, everyone but him learns that Karen has long suffered from schizophrenia and is transferred to a New Jersey mental ward after going out nude. After days of uncertainty, Ronnie reveals to Alex that Joseph was an abusive husband, however Karen's disorder blinds her of the situation. He traveled frequently for work, where he got intimate with Donna; Joseph later died in an accident. Karen grieved, placing Joseph's remains in her room and acting cold. Enraged, Ronnie threw the ashes away at a construction site. Viewing it as a cursed town, Ronnie left Rockview for a new life.

Social worker Juanita is tasked to decide whether foster care will be in Alex's best interest, but Ronnie rejects this, saying that he will stay in Rockview with Alex. Alex is invited by space organization CivSpace, which has been hearing about Alex's story, to witness the fictional Cloud 9 rocket carrying a satellite to Mars from Cape Canaveral Space Force Station. As the rocket lifts, Alex realizes that through the love and help of others, his dream of creating a successful Voyager 3 will come true.

== Characters ==
- Alexander Petroski— despite being aged 11, Alex considers himself to be as mature as a 13-year-old; he is viewed as young and immature, which annoys him. Most of his favorite songs are those included in the Voyager Golden Record. Alex considers himself a pacifist. He has a part-time job at a gas station, stacking magazines at a stand.
- Carl Sagan— Alex's pet puppy named after the famous astronomer. Alex found him at a parking lot in a Safeway store; Ronnie initially opposes the idea as it may impact Alex and Karen financially, however, Alex insisted.
- Ronnie "RJ" Petroski— Alex's older brother
- Karen Petroski— Alex's schizophrenic mother
- Joseph David Petroski— Alex's dead father. He was a European-American, whose family arrived from Europe in 1870.
- Terra— Alex’s 19-year-old half-sister living in Las Vegas. She has a boyfriend named Brandon but has no romantic feelings for him.
- Steve— an entrepreneur Alex travels with to SHARF
- Zed— an author of self-help books Alex travels with to SHARF, and Steve's roommate
- Nathan— Steve and Zed's roommate in Los Angeles
- Ken Russell— a rocket supplier in New Mexico. Terra and Alex stop by his home observatory on their way back to Rockview.
- Juanita— Alex's social worker
- Brandon— Terra's boyfriend
- Benji—Alex's best friend

== Style and themes ==
See You in the Cosmos is an epistolary novel, written in the style of a transcription of audio recordings from an iPod. Each chapter is prefixed "New Recording" and suffixed with a numeral; in total, there are 52 recordings. "New Recording 4" is "not available" as, in the story, Alex deleted the vague track. Below the chapter header, the recording's duration is written. These recordings were described to be recorded along with the novel's plot. Due to the weaknesses of auto-transcription, there are no quotations in speeches.

According to a review in Children's Literature Association Quarterly, the core themes of See You in the Cosmos are "[theological] correspondence and care". According to their analysis, "Reading Alex's missives [...] gives us insight into a child's desire for connection, the value of correspondence (in whatever form it takes), and the potential for the things that we write and say today to inform the understandings of future audiences. Just as significantly, they reveal the importance of having our dreams supported by those around us".

== Publication history ==
(L - R) Darkened cover art of the French edition published by Bayard Presse; cover art of the audiobook version; cover art of the Spanish Edition (Nos Vemos en el Cosmos) published by Nube de Tinta; cover art of the German Edition (Hallo Leben, hörst du mich?) (Note: lit. 'Hello life, do you hear me?') published by cbj.

See You in the Cosmos was published by Penguin Books, as well as Dial Books (only in the US) and Puffin Books (in the UK). The release announcement was held at an event in Detroit's Pages Bookshop on February 28, 2017. The Detroit Free Press observed that there were 40 guests at the event, where Cheng also read several excerpts from the book. According to Cheng, during its national release, it was shipped to every English-speaking nation, with the German edition released the following week, and the French and Spanish editions later that year. On May 2, a group called the Young at Heart Bookgroup hosted an adult-only discussion of the book with Cheng at Anderson's Bookshop in Downer's Grove.

At the same day of its release, a six-hour audiobook version of the novel was published by Penguin Books. The audiobook stars Kivlighan de Montebello as Alex, Brittany Pressley as Terra, Graham Halstead as Steve, Michael Crouch as Ronnie, and Jason Culp as Zed, with additional narration provided by Thérèse Plummer, Susan Bennett, Dan Bittner, Pete Larkin, and Courtney Shaw.

During the COVID-19 pandemic, Cheng posted YouTube videos of him reading chapters from See You in the Cosmos to guide those on remote learning.

== Reception ==
=== Written version ===
The "enticing" and "heartwarming" See You in the Cosmos, regarded a "Sweet, quirky road story sparkles with warmth and wisdom" by Darienne Stewart of Common Sense Media (who gave the novel five out of five stars), received generally positive reviews, lauded as "sweet [and] soulful" of a debut, with glimmers of poignancy and humor. The novel was also said to make good use of foreshadowing, which "keep readers turning the pages in suspense". It was listed by various review outlets as one of the best children's or Middle Grade books.

Numerous reviewers such as Entertainment Weekly (who gave the novel a B+), The Chicago Tribune, and Book Riot found Alex's stubborn yet optimistic personality that colors the novel as to how the novel astounds them, making it "Riveting, inspiring, and sometimes hilarious". "Meghan Cox Gurdon, writing for The Wall Street Journal, reckoned that "Some readers ages 10–15 may find that Alex's star-struck naiveté gets a bit grating, but those who don't will discover much that rewards in Jack Cheng's life-embracing, stream-of-consciousness tale of family lost and found". Alex is regarded to have a memorable and resonating bundle of emotions; The New York Times Book Review's Natalie Standiford elaborated, "If extraterrestrials ever did find his Golden iPod, they would think Earthlings were wonderful."

The transcript style of narrative is also praised by many, remarked "a brilliant, refreshing structure": "An odd medium that sounds like it would be confusing but really works". It is seen as a subtle trick to transition between its quirky and deep moments, as well as an effective tool to indulge readers into the characters' misery. Critics thinks that it blends well with Alex's childishly-mature attitude: "a propulsive stream-of-conscious dive into Alex's life". Standiford wrote that the transcript, being from a first-person point of view and told to an imagined audience of extraterrestrial life, "intercut with the voices of others when Alex is unable to record—makes up the entire text of [the novel] a strategy that works beautifully thanks to the charm, directness and subtle emotion of Alex’s voice". Deborah Stevenson of The Bulletin of the Center for Children's Books, however, noted that the space the transcript takes—exacerbated by the many plot elements in play—causes the vital subplot of the loss of Carl Sagan untouched. Broadly, she also find the style to be "dauntingly torrential".

=== Audiobook ===
AudioFile praised Kivlighan de Montebello for embodying the character of Alex, as well as being "engaging". The audiobook's episodic narrative is also said to "make it easy to suspend disbelief and renders this an altogether captivating listening experience." Meanwhile, Booklist wrote that the style of the novel "is a natural fit for an audiobook, and the narrators hit it out of the park." The magazine's Ashley Young praised the cast, as well as the audiobook's use of sound effects.

=== Accolades ===
Award	Category	Result	Ref.
2018 Golden Kite Award	Middle Grade Fiction	Won	
2018 Audie Award	Middle Grade	Won	
2018—2019 Dorothy Canfield Fisher Children's Book Award	Master List	Listed	
2019 Oklahoma Sequoyah Book Awards	Grade 6—8	Nominated	
2017 VOYA's Top Shelf Fiction for Middle School Readers	Grade 6—8	3rd place	

== Future ==
Cheng said that he has no plans to create a sequel, but does not stand firm on it. He also said that he has been negotiating with the film industry for a film adaptation, "but that's still a long ways from it being a movie you can watch".
