= Lee Cole (writer) =

American author

- Education: University of Louisville; Iowa Writers' Workshop
- Occupation: Writer
- Writing career
- Period: 2020–present
- Notable works: Groundskeeping; Fulfillment
- Website: leecolebooks.com

Lee Cole is an American author. His debut novel, Groundskeeping, was published by Alfred A. Knopf in 2022. His second novel, Fulfillment, was published by Knopf in 2025.

== Early life and education ==
Cole was born to Amanda Orr and Hal Cole in Paducah, Kentucky, and raised in the area. He has a sister, Madelyn Carpenter. He lived for a time in Louisville. He started out at the University of Kentucky, transferred to the University of Missouri–St. Louis, and graduated from the University of Louisville. He is a graduate of the Iowa Writers' Workshop, where he studied from 2017 to 2019.

== Career ==
Cole's first novel, Groundskeeping, about an aspiring writer who moves back to his home state of Kentucky, where he works as a groundskeeper at a local college and enrolls in a creative writing workshop, was published by Knopf on March 1, 2022. It was a Read with Jenna pick by Jenna Bush Hager. His second novel, Fulfillment, about two half-brothers, one an academic, the other dreaming of becoming a screenwriter, was published by Knopf on June 17, 2025. The novel was inspired in part by the three years Cole spent working nights at a UPS hub, imagining his life if he had stayed at that type of job.

== Bibliography ==
=== Novels ===
- Groundskeeping (Alfred A. Knopf, 2022)
- Fulfillment (Alfred A. Knopf, 2025)
