= Los Angeles Times Book Prize for Young Adult Novel =

Annual literary prize

- Description: Excellence in young adult literature
- Country: United States
- Presented by: Los Angeles Times
- Website: events.latimes.com/festivalofbooks/bookprize/

The Los Angeles Times Book Prize for Young Adult Novel, established in 1998, is a category of the Los Angeles Times Book Prize. Works are eligible during the year of their first US publication in English, though they may be written originally in languages other than English.

== Recipients ==
Los Angeles Times Book Prize for Young Adult Novel winners and finalists
Year	Author	Title	Result	Ref.
1998	Joan Bauer	Rules of the Road	Winner	
1998	Joan Abelove	Go and Come Back	Finalist	
1998	Louis Sachar	Holes	Finalist	
1998	Michael Cadnum	In a Dark Wood	Finalist	
1998	Gary Paulsen	Soldier’s Heart: Being the Story of the Enlistment and Due Service of the Boy Charley Goddard	Finalist	
1999	Robert Cormier	Frenchtown Summer	Winner	
1999	Walter Dean Myers	Monster	Finalist	
1999	David Almond	Skellig	Finalist	
1999	Laurie Halse Anderson	Speak	Finalist	
1999	Sonya Sones	Stop Pretending: What Happened When My Big Sister Went Crazy	Finalist	
2000	Jacqueline Woodson	Miracle's Boys	Winner	
2000	Pam Muñoz Ryan	Esperanza Rising	Finalist	
2000	Adam Bagdasarian	Forgotten Fire	Finalist	
2000	Carolyn Coman	Many Stones	Finalist	
2000	Lori Aurelia Williams	When Kambia Elaine Flew in from Neptune	Finalist	
2001	Mildred D. Taylor	The Land	Winner	
2001	A. M. Jenkins	Damage	Finalist	
2001	Norma Fox Mazer	Girlhearts	Finalist	
2001	Beverley Naidoo	The Other Side of Truth	Finalist	
2001	Kevin Crossley-Holland	The Seeing Stone	Finalist	
2002	M. T. Anderson	Feed	Winner	
2002	E. R. Frank	America	Finalist	
2002	Joyce Carol Oates	Big Mouth & Ugly Girl	Finalist	
2002	Kate Banks	Dillon Dillon	Finalist	
2002	Sarah Dessen	This Lullaby	Finalist	
2003	Jennifer Donnelly	A Northern Light	Winner	
2003	Francine Prose	After	Finalist	
2003	Kevin Henkes	Olive’s Ocean	Finalist	
2003	Richard Peck	The River Between Us	Finalist	
2003	Martha Brooks	True Confessions of a Heartless Girl	Finalist	
2004	Melvin Burgess	Doing It	Winner	
2004	Meg Rosoff	How I Live Now	Finalist	
2004	Michael Morpurgo	Private Peaceful	Finalist	
2004	Benjamin Alire Sáenz	Sammy and Juliana in Hollywood	Finalist	
2004	Adam Rapp	Under the Wolf, Under the Dog	Finalist	
2005	Per Nilsson with Tara Chace (trans.)	You & You & You	Winner	
2005	Margo Lanagan	Black Juice	Finalist	
2005	Markus Zusak	I Am the Messenger	Finalist	
2005	John Green	Looking for Alaska	Finalist	
2005	Andreas Steinhöfel	The Center of the World	Finalist	
2006	Coe Booth	Tyrell	Winner	
2006	John Green	An Abundance of Katherines	Finalist	
2006	Meg Rosoff	Just in Case	Finalist	
2006	M. T. Anderson	The Astonishing Life of Octavian Nothing, Traitor to the Nation, Volume I: The Pox Party	Finalist	
2006	Nancy Werlin	The Rules of Survival	Finalist	
2007	Philip Reeve	A Darkling Plain	Winner	
2007	Kenneth Oppel	Darkwing	Finalist	
2007	Sherman Alexie with art by Ellen Forney	The Absolutely True Diary of a Part-Time Indian	Finalist	
2007	Geraldine McCaughrean	The White Darkness	Finalist	
2007	Walter Dean Myers	What They Found: Love on 145th Street	Finalist	
2008	Terry Pratchett	Nation	Winner	
2008	Oscar Hijuelos	Dark Dude	Finalist	
2008	Nate Powell	Swallow Me Whole	Finalist	
2008	Neil Gaiman with Dave McKean and Chris Riddell (illus.)	The Graveyard Book	Finalist	
2008	Candace Fleming	The Lincolns: A Scrapbook Look at Abraham and Mary	Finalist	
2009	Elizabeth Partridge	Marching for Freedom: Walk Together Children and Don't You Grow Weary	Winner	
2009	Deborah Heiligman	Charles and Emma: The Darwins’ Leap of Faith	Finalist	
2009	Shaun Tan	Tales from Outer Suburbia	Finalist	
2009	Frances Hardinge	The Lost Conspiracy	Finalist	
2009	James Cross Giblin	The Rise and Fall of Senator Joe McCarthy	Finalist	
2010	Megan Whalen Turner	A Conspiracy of Kings	Winner	
2010	Marc Aronson and Marina Budhos	Sugar Changed the World: A Story of Magic, Spice, Slavery, Freedom, and Science	Finalist	
2010	Rick Yancey	The Curse of the Wendigo	Finalist	
2010	Jonathan Stroud	The Ring of Solomon	Finalist	
2010	Stephanie Hemphill	Wicked Girls: A Novel of the Salem Witch Trials	Finalist	
2011	Pete Hautman	The Big Crunch	Winner	
2011	Patrick Ness with Jim Kay (illus.)	A Monster Calls	Finalist	
2011	Libba Bray	Beauty Queens	Finalist	
2011	Mal Peet	Life: An Exploded Diagram	Finalist	
2011	Maggie Stiefvater	The Scorpio Races	Finalist	
2012	A. S. King	Ask the Passengers	Winner	
2012	Matthew Quick	Boy21	Finalist	
2012	Elizabeth Wein	Code Name Verity	Finalist	
2012	Martine Leavitt	My Book of Life by Angel	Finalist	
2012	Paolo Bacigalupi	The Drowned Cities	Finalist	
2013	Gene Yang	Boxers and Saints	Winner	
2013	Rainbow Rowell	Fangirl	Finalist	
2013	Jonathan Stroud	Lockwood & Co: The Screaming Staircase	Finalist	
2013	Elizabeth Knox	Mortal Fire	Finalist	
2013	Joyce Sidman	What the Heart Knows: Chants	Finalist	
2014	Candace Fleming	The Family Romanov: Murder, Rebellion, and the Fall of Imperial Russia	Winner	
2014	Jacqueline Woodson	Brown Girl Dreaming	Finalist	
2014	Paul Fleischman	Eyes Wide Open: Going Behind the Environmental Headlines	Finalist	
2014	Andrew Smith	Grasshopper Jungle	Finalist	
2014	E.K. Johnston	The Story of Owen: Dragon Slayer of Trondheim	Finalist	
2015	Marilyn Nelson	My Seneca Village	Winner	
2015	Don Brown	Drowned City: Hurricane Katrina and New Orleans	Finalist	
2015	Steve Sheinkin	Most Dangerous: Daniel Ellsberg and the Secret History of the Vietnam War	Finalist	
2015	Jason Reynolds	The Boy in the Black Suit	Finalist	
2015	Laura Amy Schlitz	The Hired Girl	Finalist	
2016	Frances Hardinge	The Lie Tree	Winner	
2016	Meg Medina	Burn, Baby, Burn	Finalist	
2016	John Lewis, Andrew Aydin, and Nate Powell	March: Book Three	Finalist	
2016	Socorro Acioli with Daniel Hahn (trans.)	The Head of the Saint	Finalist	
2016	Julie Berry	The Passion of Dolssa	Finalist	
2017	Jason Reynolds	Long Way Down	Winner	
2017	E. Lockhart	Genuine Fraud	Finalist	
2017	Renée Watson	Piecing Me Together	Finalist	
2017	Dashka Slater	The 57 Bus: A True Story of Two Teenagers and the Crime That Changed Their Lives	Finalist	
2017	Angie Thomas	The Hate U Give	Finalist	
2018	Elizabeth Acevedo	The Poet X	Winner	
2018	M.T. Anderson and Eugene Yelchin	The Assassination of Brangwain Spurge	Finalist	
2018	Leslie Connor	The Truth as Told by Mason Buttle	Finalist	
2018	Christopher Paul Curtis	The Journey of Little Charlie	Finalist	
2018	Jarrett J. Krosoczka	Hey, Kiddo	Finalist	
2019	Malla Nunn	When the Ground is Hard	Winner	
2019	Laurie Halse Anderson	Shout	Finalist	
2019	A. S. King	Dig	Finalist	
2019	Thanhha Lai	Butterfly Yellow	Finalist	
2019	Randy Ribay	Patron Saints of Nothing	Finalist	
2020	Yusef Salaam and Ibi Zoboi	Punching the Air	Winner	
2020	Allan Wolf	The Snow Fell Three Graves Deep: Voices from the Donner Party	Finalist	
2020	Dean Atta	The Black Flamingo	Finalist	
2020	Karen Schneemann and Lily Williams	Go With the Flow	Finalist	
2020	Tracy Deonn	Legendborn	Finalist	
2021	Rita Williams-Garcia	A Sitting in St. James	Winner	
2021	Malinda Lo	Last Night at the Telegraph Club	Finalist	
2021	Darcie Little Badger	A Snake Falls to Earth	Finalist	
2021	Kekla Magoon	Revolution in Our Time	Finalist	
2021	Paula Yoo	From a Whisper to a Rallying Cry	Finalist	
2022	Lyn Miller-Lachmann	Torch	Winner	
2022	Samira Ahmed	Hollow Fires	Finalist	
2022	Sabaa Tahir	All My Rage	Finalist	
2022	Andrew Joseph White	Hell Followed With Us	Finalist	
2022	Kip Wilson	The Most Dazzling Girl in Berlin	Finalist	
2023	Amber McBride	Gone Wolf	Winner	
2023	Jennifer Baker	Forgive Me Not	Finalist	
2023	Olivia A. Cole	Dear Medusa	Finalist	
2023	Kim Johnson	Invisible Son	Finalist	
2023	Sarah Myer	Monstrous: A Transracial Adoption Story	Finalist	
2024	Kim Johnson	The Color of a Lie	Winner	
2024	Traci Chee	Kindling	Finalist	
2024	K.A. Cobell	Looking for Smoke	Finalist	
2024	Safia Elhillo	Bright Red Fruit	Finalist	
2024	Carolina Ixta	Shut Up, This Is Serious	Finalist	
2025	Trung Le Nguyen	Angelica and the Bear Prince	Winner	
2025	K. Ancrum	The Corruption of Hollis Brown	Finalist	
2025	Idris Goodwin	King of the Neuro Verse	Finalist	
2025	Jaime Jo Hoang	My Mother, the Mermaid Chaser	Finalist	
2025	Hannah V. Sawyerr	Truth Is	Finalist	
