= All the Blues in the Sky =

2025 children's novel by Renée Watson

All The Blues in the Sky
- Author: Renée Watson
- Language: English
- Publisher: Bloomsbury Publishing
- Publication date: February 4, 2025
- Publication place: United States
- Media type: Print (hardcover)
- Pages: 208
- ISBN: 9781547605897

All the Blues in the Sky is a 2025 children's novel, written in both prose and free verse, by American's children author Renée Watson.

== Synopsis ==
After her best friend is killed in a hit and run, young girl Sage struggles to process the grief from the tragedy. While in grief counseling, Sage connects with other students who have experienced similar losses. She finds herself angry, bitter, and sad as she compares the death of her friend to the other children's experiences, but after finally releasing her pent-up feelings, she begins to make progress toward healing.

== Reception ==
The book won the 2026 Newbery Medal, was a Kirkus Reviews Best Book of the Year, and a New York Public Library Best Book of the Year. Kirkus praised Watson's writing, calling Sage's voice "visceral and wholly authentic", and The Horn Book called it a "poignant story for all and a valuable resource for those experiencing grief and loss". The book was Waton's second Newbery recognition, after 2017's Piecing Me Together.
