= Ekua Holmes =

American mixed-media artist (born 1955)

- Born: 6 July 1955 (age 71); Roxbury, Massachusetts

Ekua Holmes (born in 1955) is an American mixed-media artist, children's book illustrator, and arts organization professional. Holmes' primary method of art making is mixed media collage, by layering newspaper, photos, fabric, and other materials to create colorful compositions. Many of these works evoke her childhood in Roxbury's Washington Park neighborhood in Boston, MA.

== Early life and education ==
Ekua Holmes was born in Roxbury, Massachusetts in 1955.

Holmes holds a BFA in Photography from the Massachusetts College of Art and Design.

== Fine art career ==
As a young artist, Holmes discovered the power of found objects, which derive their identity as art from places as well as the social histories attached to the objects. She uses found newspapers, magazines, old stamps, and so on. She often creates patterns using these materials. Childhood, family bonds, memory, and resilience are frequent themes in her work. Many of Holmes's collages are reminiscent of works by African and African American artists such as the late Romare Bearden, Jacob Lawrence, and Njideka Akunyili. Like these artists, her works reflect a commitment to Black imagery and representation.

About her work, Holmes said,

“In everything I create I hear them saying, ‘Remember Me,’ and through my work I honor their legacies by bringing them forward to life with torn and cut shapes of found colors and textures. With these scraps and remnants, assembled like a down-home quilt, I rebuild my world, putting in what speaks to my personal and cultural narrative.”

=== Google Doodle ===
On Martin Luther King Jr. Day in 2015, Holmes's Google Doodle illustration honoring the civil rights leader was the featured image on Google's U.S. homepage. The collage depicts King walking arm in arm with fellow activists in Selma, Alabama.

=== Arts organizations ===
Holmes founded The Great Black Art Collection, an organization dedicated to both giving a platform to emerging artists and to introducing Black art to previously unreached audiences.

Holmes is currently Vice-Chair of the Boston Arts Commission. Holmes is also currently working in Boston as an assistant director at the Center for Art and Community Partnerships at MassArt. There, she manages sparc! the ArtMobile.

== Illustration career ==
Holmes has illustrated several children's picture books, garnering awards for several.

- Voice of Freedom: Fannie Lou Hamer, The Spirit of the Civil Rights Movement, written by Carole Boston Weatherford (Candlewick Press, 2015)
- Out of Wonder: Poems Celebrating Poets, by Kwame Alexander with Chris Colderley and Marjory Wentworth (Candlewick Press, 2017)
- The Stuff of Stars, by Marion Dane Bauer (Candlewick Press, 2018)
- What Do You Do with a Voice Like That?: The Story of Extraordinary Congresswoman Barbara Jordan, by Chris Barton (Beach Lane Books, 2018)
- Black Is a Rainbow Color, by Angela Joy (Roaring Brook Press, 2020)
- Black Girl You Are Atlas, by Renée Watson (Kokila, 2024)

== Exhibitions and collections ==
A selection of works from her award-winning children’s book illustrations is on view at the MFA Boston as part of a 2021 solo exhibition titled, "Paper Stories, Layered Dreams The Art of Ekua Holmes". These works consist of collages and original illustrations from Holmes’s published book projects.

Holmes' first exhibition was in 2000, at "Renewal and Regeneration" at Museum of Our National Heritage, Lexington, MA.

She has also exhibited at Hess Gallery of Pine Manor College, Chestnut Hill, MA, and Harvard Medical School's Transit Gallery.

Her work is in the public collections of the Museum of the National Center of Afro-American Artists, Boston Medical Center, Boston Arts Academy, Dana Farber Cancer Center and the Boston Children's Hospital.

Holmes' "Crosswalks and Bus Stops " was installed at Northeastern University, in oversize glass windows that faced onto Parker Street and Huntington Avenue. The work was part of Northeastern's Public Art Initiative, a platform for artists from the local community and the world.

== Awards ==
In 2013, Holmes was awarded the NAACP Image Award.

Voice of Freedom won a Caldecott Honor, a Robert F. Sibert Honor, John Steptoe New Talent Illustrator Award, and a Boston Globe-Horn Book Nonfiction Honor.

Holmes was awarded the 2018 Coretta Scott King Illustrator Award for Out of Wonder and the 2019 award for The Stuff of Stars.

Holmes was the recipient of a 2013 Brother Thomas Fellowship from The Boston Foundation. Also in 2013, Holmes was named to the Boston Art Commission, which oversees public art projects on city property. In 2015, she installed a community-based work for an opening at the Institute of Contemporary Art Boston, which consisted of a gigantic interactive collage with scenes of Boston in transition, designed to complement the ICA group show, “When the Stars Begin to Fall.”
