= Abelove =

Abelove is a surname. Notable people with the surname include:

- Henry D. Abelove (born 1945), American academic and literary scholar
- Joan Abelove (born 1945), American author
