= Black Enough =

2019 young adult anthology

- First edition book cover
- Editor: Ibi Zoboi
- Publisher: HarperCollins
- Publication date: January 8, 2019
- ISBN: 9780062698742

Black Enough: Stories of Being Young & Black in America is a 2019 young adult anthology edited by Ibi Zoboi. The fictional stories are all written by Black authors and "explor[e] black interconnectedness, traditions, and identity in terms of how they apply to black teens". Common themes include Black identity, sexual awakening, and teenage worries.

== Contents ==
- "Introduction" by Ibi Zoboi
- "Half a Moon" by Renée Watson
- "Black Enough" by Varian Johnson
- "Warning: Color May Fade" by Leah Henderson
- "Black. Nerd. Problems." by Lamar Giles
- "Out of the Silence" by Kekla Magoon
- "The Ingredients" by Jason Reynolds
- "Oreo" by Brandy Colbert
- "Samson and the Delilahs" by Tochi Onyebuchi
- "Stop Playing" by Liara Tamani
- "Wild Horses, Wild Hearts" by Jay Coles
- "Whoa!" by Rita Williams-Garcia
- "Gravity" by Tracey Baptiste
- "The Trouble with Drowning" by Dhonielle Clayton
- "Kissing Sarah Smart" by Justina Ireland
- "Hackathon Summers" by Coe Booth
- "Into the Starlight" by Nic Stone
- "The (R)Evolution of Nigeria Jones" by Ibi Zoboi

== Reception ==
Black Enough received starred reviews from Booklist, Kirkus Reviews, and Publishers Weekly.

Booklist's Enishia Davenport highlighted how the anthology "shirks off the literary world's tired obsession with only depicting the struggles of Black teens. With this, readers see everyday struggles as well as the ordinary yet remarkable joys of Black teens that have nothing to do with the trauma of their history."

Similarly, Kirkus Reviews said the book is "nuanced and necessary" and referred to it as "a breath of fresh air and a sigh of long overdue relief". They highlighted its "fully human" characters while noting that "the presence of trans, Afro-Latinx, and physically disabled characters is missed".

Publishers Weekly said, "The stories, all worth savoring, share a celebratory outlook on black teenagers fully and courageously embracing life".

Mary Quattlebaum, writing for The Washington Post, also reviewed the anthology.

== Honors ==
In 2019, Booklist included Black Enough on their top ten list of "Diverse Fiction for Youth". The following year, the Young Adult Library Services Association included it on their Amazing Audiobooks for Young Adults and Quick Picks for Reluctant Young Adult Readers lists.
