= Repossessed =

Repossessed may refer to:

- Repossessed (film), a 1990 American comedy film
- Repossessed (album), a 1986 album by Kris Kristofferson
- Repossessed, a novel by A. M. Jenkins

== See also ==
- Repossession
