= Tracey Baptiste =

Children's horror author from the Caribbean

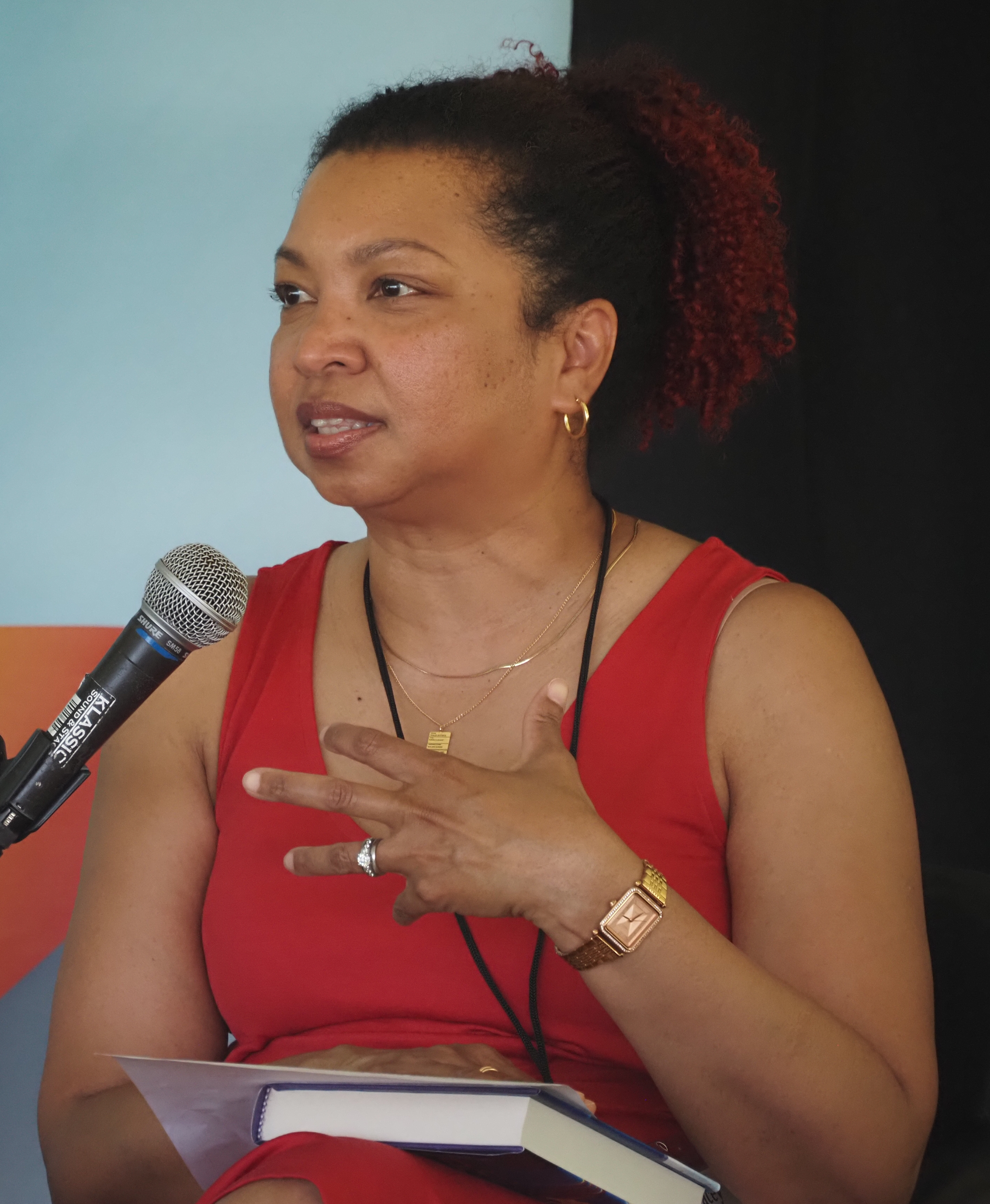
- at the 2026 Gaithersburg Book Festival
- Born: March 7, 1972 (age 54); San Fernando, Trinidad and Tobago
- Education: New York University (M.Ed)
- Notable work: Black Enough (2019)
- Website: traceybaptiste.com

Tracey Baptiste (born 7 March 1972) is a children's horror author from the Caribbean who uses folk stories in her novels.

== Biography ==
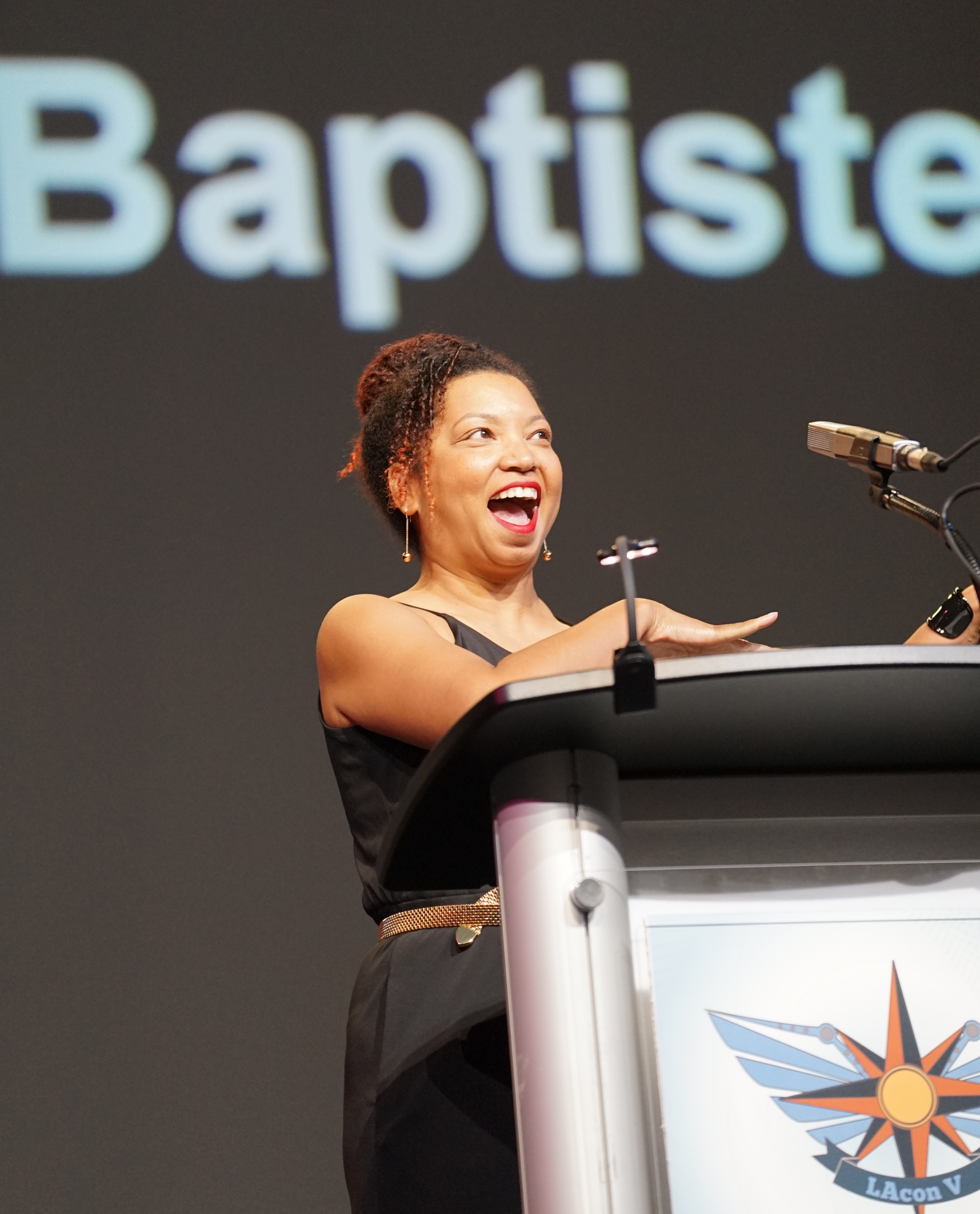
Baptiste presenting 2026 Hugo Award for Best Young Adult Book

Born in Trinidad in 1972, Tracey Baptiste moved to Brooklyn, NY, when she was fifteen. She received with an M.Ed. in elementary education from New York University after finishing a BA in English and Comparative Literature.

Baptiste went on to work as an elementary school teacher and then a textbook editor. She lives in New Jersey where she works on her own novels and is part of the faculty in Lesley University where she is part of their creative writing MFA program.

Baptiste wrote The Crash, a Minecraft novel which debuted on the New York Times best seller list in 2018. She also writes nonfiction books for children.

== Publications ==
=== Nonfiction books ===
==== Young readers ====
- Because Claudette. Illustrated by Tonya Engel. Dial Books. 2022. ISBN 9780593326404.
- The Totally Gross History of Ancient Egypt. Rosen Central. 2015. ISBN 9781499437546.

==== Middle grade ====
- African Icons: Ten People Who Built a Continent. Illustrated by Hillary D. Wilson. Algonquin Young Readers. 2021. ISBN 9781616209001.
- Rosa Parks & Claudette Colvin: Civil Rights Heroes. Illustrated by Shauna J. Grant. First Second Books. 2023. ISBN 9781250174215.

=== Fiction ===
==== Middle Grade ====
- Minecraft: The Crash. Del Rey Books. 2018. ISBN 9780399180675.
- Moko Magic: Carnival Chaos. Disney Publishing Group. 2024. ISBN 9781368074377.
- Boy 2.0. Little, Brown Books for Young Readers. 2024. ISBN 9781643753812.
- Kid X. New York: Little, Brown and Company. 2026. ISBN 978-1-64375-382-9.

==== Young adult ====
- Angel's Grace. Simon & Schuster. 2005. ISBN 978-0-689-86773-6.

===== The Jumbies series =====
- The Jumbies. Algonquin Young Readers. 2015. ISBN 9781616204143.
- Rise of the Jumbies. Algonquin Young Readers. 2017. ISBN 9781616206659.
- The Jumbie God's Revenge. Algonquin Young Readers. 2019. ISBN 9781643750002.

==== Picture books ====
- If You Were a Kid in the Wild West. Children's Press. 2018. ISBN 9780531232156.
- Looking for a Jumbie. Illustrated by Amber Ren. Balzer + Bray. 2021. ISBN 9780062970817.
- Marley and the Family Band. Co-written with Cedella Marley and illustrated by Tiffany Rose. Random House Books for Young Readers. 2022. ISBN 9780593301111.
- Mermaid and Pirate. Illustrated by Leisl Adams. Algonquin Young Readers. 2023. ISBN 9781643750774.

=== Short fiction ===
- Zoboi, Ibi, ed. (2019). "Gravity". Black Enough: Stories of Being Young & Black in America. Balzer + Bray. ISBN 9780062698742.
- Brooks, Kinitra; Addison, Linda D.; Morris, Susana, eds. (2017). Sycorax's Daughters. Cedar Grove Books. ISBN 9781941958445.
- Schaubert, Lancelot, ed. (2020). Of Gods and Globes II: A Cosmic Anthology. Lance Schaubert. ISBN 9781949547054.
- Hudson, Wade; Willis Hudson, Cheryl, eds. (2020). "Ten". The Talk: Conversations about Race, Love & Truth. Illustrated by April Harrison. Crown Books for Young Readers. pp. 71–78. ISBN 9780593121610.
- Charaipotra, Sona; Ahmed, Samira, eds. (2023). "Kiss Me Goodbye". Magic Has No Borders. Art by Nimali. HarperTeen. ISBN 9780063208261.

=== Books edited ===
- The Civil War and Reconstruction Eras. Britannica Educational Publishing. 2015. ISBN 9781680480399.
