= Olivia Cole (disambiguation) =

Olivia Cole may refer to:

- Olivia Cole (1942-2018), American actress
- Olivia Cole (poet) (born 1981), British poet
- Olivia Bent-Cole (born 2005), American field hockey player
- Olivia A. Cole, American writer
