= A. S. King =

American writer (born 1970)

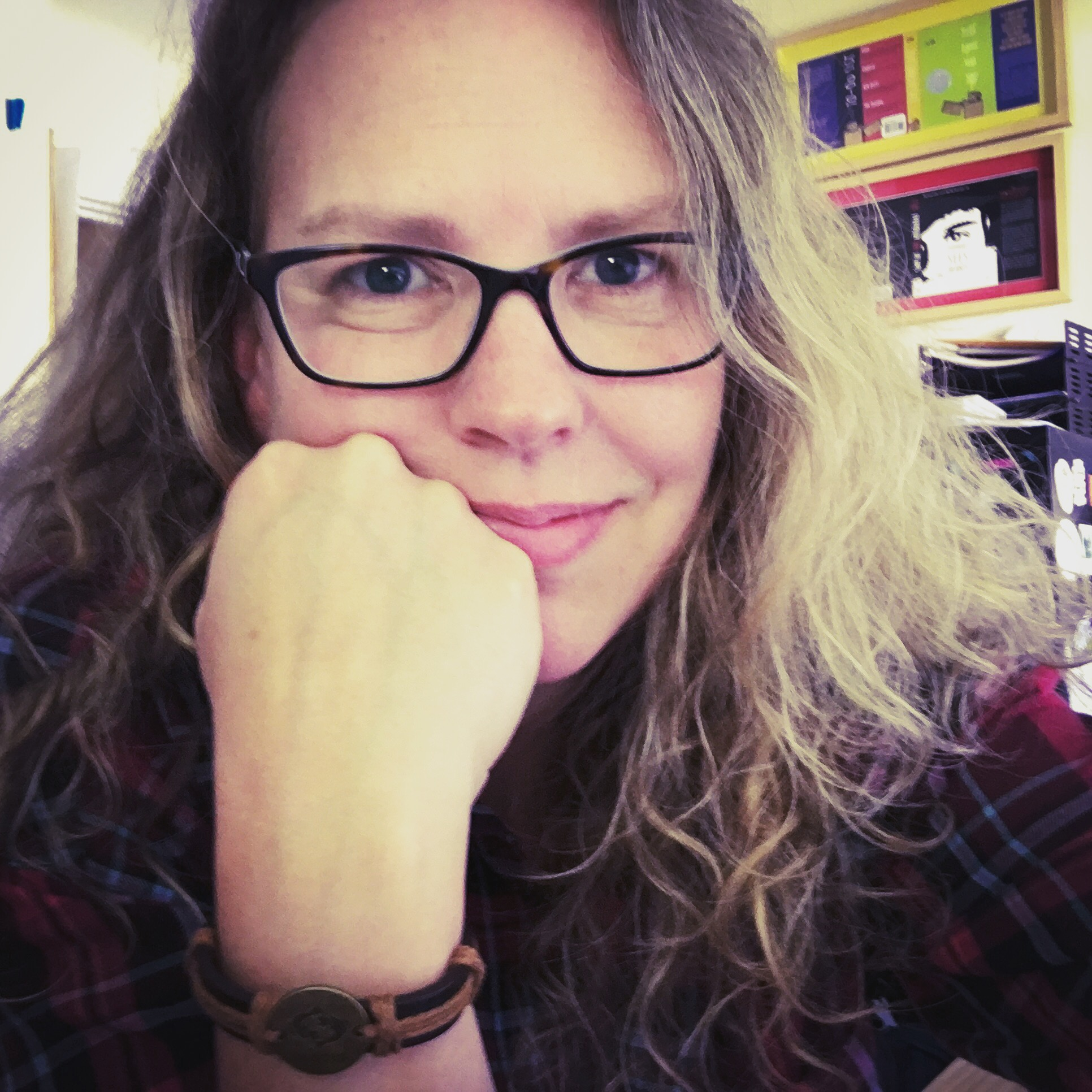
- King in her office in Pennsylvania
- Born: March 10, 1970 (age 56); Reading, Pennsylvania, U.S.
- Occupation: Writer
- Writing career
- Genres: Young-adult novels and short fiction
- Notable work: Ask the Passengers
- Notable awards: Michael L. Printz Award Honor 2011; Los Angeles Times Book Prize 2012; Michael L. Printz Award Winner 2020; Margaret A. Edwards Award 2022; Michael L. Printz Award Winner 2024

Amy Sarig King (born March 10, 1970) is an American writer of short fiction and young adult fiction. She is the recipient of the 2022 Margaret Edwards Award for her "significant and lasting contribution to young adult literature". She is also the only two-time recipient of the Michael L. Printz Award for Dig (2019) and as editor and contributor to The Collectors: Stories (2023).

== Biography ==
King was born March 10, 1970, in Reading, Pennsylvania. She graduated from Exeter Township Senior High School in 1988, earned a degree in photography at The Art Institute of Philadelphia, and then moved to Dublin, Ireland, where she began writing novels in 1994. After two years in Dublin, she relocated to Tipperary, where she renovated a farm and taught literacy to adults. She returned to Pennsylvania in 2004 and published her first novel, The Dust of 100 Dogs, in 2009, after fifteen years of writing.

== Career ==
=== Works ===
King is the author of numerous young adult books that have earned her recognition as "one of the best YA writers working today" by The New York Times Book Review. Her work is known for bridging the gap between young adult and adult readers. She also writes acclaimed middle grade novels under her full name, Amy Sarig King. Her short fiction for adults has been widely published and nominated for Best New American Voices.

=== Teaching, presentations, and philanthropy ===
King is a former faculty member of the Writing for Children and Young Adults Master of Fine Arts program at Vermont College of Fine Arts. An experienced teacher and presenter, King spends many months of the year traveling the U.S. for school visits, conferences, workshops, and literary festivals. King devotes much of her time and platform to mental health advocacy. In her presentations, she often centers topics such as life skills, emotions, bullying, self-esteem, safe relationships, and trauma.

In 2023, King and her son founded Gracie’s House, a nonprofit that provides safe spaces for LGBTQ+ youth to express themselves artistically and to enjoy nature and camping. The organization is named for King’s late daughter.

== Awards and honors ==
In 2015, King was named the "Outstanding Pennsylvania Author" for that year by the Pennsylvania School Librarians Associations; all of her novels are set in the state. In 2022, she won the American Library Association's Margaret Edwards Award, which recognizes an author and "a specific body of his or her work, for significant and lasting contribution to young adult literature". In 2024, King was awarded the YALSA's Michael L. Printz Award, for the anthology The Collectors: Stories — the first time an anthology has won the award and the first time an author has won the award twice.

Awards and honors for individual books are listed below.

=== The Dust of 100 Dogs ===
Awards for The Dust of 100 Dogs
Year	Award	Result	Ref.
2009	Cybils Award for Young Adult Fantasy & Science Fiction	Finalist	
2010	ALA Best Fiction for Young Adults	Selection	

=== Please Ignore Vera Dietz ===
Please Ignore Vera Dietz is a Junior Library Guild book. Kirkus Reviews named the book one of the best books for teens in 2010, and Bank Street College of Education included it on their list of the Best Books of 2011 for Ages 14 and Up.

Awards for Please Ignore Vera Dietz
Year	Award	Result	Ref.
2010	Cybils Award for Young Adult Fantasy/Science Fiction	Nominee	
2011	ALA Best Fiction for Young Adults	Selection	
2011	Edgar Allan Poe Award for Best Young Adult Novel	Finalist	
2011	Michael L. Printz Award	Honor	

=== Monica Never Shuts Up ===
Monica Never Shuts Up was nominated for 2010 Best New American Voices, Short Fiction.

=== Everybody Sees the Ants ===
Everybody Sees the Ants is a Junior Library Guild book.

Awards for Everybody Sees the Ants
Year	Award	Result	Ref.
2011	Andre Norton Award	Finalist	
2011	Cybils Award for Young Adult Fiction	Finalist	
2012	ALA Best Fiction for Young Adults	Top 10	

=== Ask the Passengers ===
Ask the Passengers is a Junior Library Guild book. The book was named one of the best young adult books of the year by Kirkus Reviews and Publishers Weekly. Andrew Harwell of HarperCollins Children's Books also favorited Ask the Passengers for 2013, stating,

To my mind, King falls in a camp with George Saunders as a writer who flouts conventions of genre and structure out of a sense that the world is full of meaning, but it is also totally crazy. King's books repeatedly stretch the boundaries of YA fiction, and are always grounded by their unflinching looks at real, imperfect families. So while I would be hard-pressed to say which of her books was my favorite read in 2013, it would definitely be one of them, and I think that says it all.

Awards for Ask the Passenger
Year	Award	Result	Ref.
2012	Los Angeles Times Book Prize for Young Adult Novel	Winner	
2013	ALA Best Fiction for Young Adults	Selection	
2013	ALA Rainbow Book List	Top 10	
2013	Amelia Elizabeth Walden Award	Finalist	
2013	Lambda Literary Award for Children's and Young Adult Literature	Finalist	
2013	Carolyn W. Field Award	Winner	

=== Reality Boy ===
Reality Boy is a Junior Library Guild book. Kirkus Reviews and Publishers Weekly named it one of the best books of the year. In 2014, the American Library Association selected it for their "Quick Picks for Reluctant Young Adult Readers" list.

=== Glory O'Brien's History of the Future ===
Glory O'Brien's History of the Future is a Junior Library Guild book. The Boston Globe, Bustle, Kirkus Reviews, the Los Angeles Public Library, the New York Public Library, Publishers Weekly, and School Library Journal named it one of the best young adult books of 2014. It was also named a New York Times Editor's Choice and Booklist Editors' Choice book.

Awards for Glory O'Brien's History of the Future
Year	Award	Result	Ref.
2014	Cybils Award for Young Adult Speculative Fiction	Finalist	
2015	Amazing Audiobooks for Young Adults	Top 10	
2015	Andre Norton Award	Finalist	
2015	Amelia Bloomer Book List	Selection	
2015	Amelia Elizabeth Walden Award	Winner	
2015	NAIBA Book of the Year: Children's Literature	Winner	

=== I Crawl Through It ===
I Crawl Through It is a Junior Library Guild book. Booklist, The Horn Book Magazine, and VOYA named it one of the best novels of the year.

=== Still Life with Tornado ===
Both the book and audiobook versions of Still Life with Tornado are Junior Library Guild selections. The New York Times, Publishers Weekly, School Library Journal, Shelf Awareness named it one of the best young adult novels of the year.

Awards for Still Life with Tornado
Year	Award	Result	Ref.
2016	Booklist Editors' Choice: Books for Youth	Selection	
2016	Cybils Awards	Finalist	
2017	ALA Best Fiction for Young Adults	Selection	
2017	NAIBA Best Book – Young Adult Literature	Winner	

=== Me and Marvin Gardens ===
The Washington Post and Chicago Public Library named Me and Marvin Gardens one of the best books of the year. It is a 2018-2019 Texas Bluebonnet Award Master List selection, 2018-2019 Pennsylvania Young Readers Choice Awards nominee, and 2019 Rebecca Caudill Young Readers' Book Award nominee.

=== Dig ===
In 2019, The Horn Book Magazine named Dig one of the best novels of the year, as did School Library Journal.

Awards for Dig
Year	Award	Result	Ref.
2020	Amazing Audiobooks for Young Adults	Top 10	
2020	Los Angeles Times Book Prize for Young Adult	Finalist	
2020	Michael L. Printz Award	Winner	

=== The Year We Fell from Space ===
The Year We Fell from Space is a Junior Library Guild book.

In 2019, The Horn Book Magazine named it one of the best novels of the year, as did The Bulletin of the Center for Children's Books. The American Library Association also included in on their 2020 Notable Children's Books list.

=== Switch ===
BookPage and the Chicago Public Library named Switch one of the best young adult books of 2021. The Young Adult Library Services Association included it on their 2022 list of the Best Fiction for Young Adults.

=== The Collectors: Stories ===
King became the only person to win the two Michael L. Printz Awards with The Collectors: Stories, an anthology she edited and contributed to. The award is shared with M. T. Anderson, E.E. Charlton-Trujillo, David Levithan, Cory McCarthy, Anna-Marie McLemore, Greg Neri, Jason Reynolds, Randy Ribay, and Jenny Torres Sanchez.

Awards for The Collectors
Year	Award	Result	Ref.
2024	Michael L. Printz Award	Winner	

=== Pick the Lock ===
BookPage and the Chicago Public Library named Pick the Lock one of the best teen books of 2024. News Public Radio included it on their 2024 list of the NPR's Books We Love 2024.

An NPR Best Book of the Year "A roller coaster of a book, Pick the Lock is one thrill after another."—NPR
A Boston Globe Best Book of the Year
A Chicago Public Library Best Book of the Year
An Amazon Best Book of the Year
A Shelf Awareness Best Book of the Year
A Horn Book Fanfare Book
An ALA Top Ten Amazing Audiobook

== Bibliography ==
=== Books ===
- The Dust of 100 Dogs (2009, Flux)
- Please Ignore Vera Dietz (2010, Knopf)
- Everybody Sees the Ants (Oct. 2011, Little, Brown)
- Ask the Passengers (Oct. 2012, Little, Brown)
- Monica Never Shuts Up (Dec. 2012, The Bat Press)
- Reality Boy (Fall 2013, Little, Brown)
- Glory O'Brien's History of the Future (October 2014, Little, Brown)
- I Crawl Through It (Sept. 2015, Little, Brown)
- Still Life with Tornado (Fall 2016, Dutton Children's Books)
- Me And Marvin Gardens (2017, Arthur A. Levine Books)
- Dig (March 26, 2019, Dutton Children's Books)
- The Year We Fell From Space (October 2019, Arthur A. Levine Books)
- Switch (May 2021, Dutton Children's Books)
- Attack of the Black Rectangles (Scholastic Press, 2022)
- Pick the Lock (2024, Dutton)

=== Anthology appearances ===
- Dear Bully: 70 Authors Tell Their Stories (Sep. 2011, HarperTeen)
- Break These Rules: 35 YA Authors on Speaking Up, Standing Out, and Being Yourself (Sep. 2013, Chicago Review Press)
- Losing It (2013, Carolrhoda LAB)
- One Death, Nine Stories (2014, Candlewick)
- Tasting Light: Ten Science Fiction Stories to Rewire Your Perceptions (2023, MITeen Press)
- The Collectors: Stories (2023, Dutton)
