= Damage (Jenkins novel) =

2001 young adult novel written by A. M. Jenkins

- Author: A. M. Jenkins
- Language: English
- Genre: Young adult novel
- Publisher: HarperTeen
- Publication date: October 16, 2001
- ISBN: 9780060290993

Damage is a young adult novel written by A. M. Jenkins, published October 16, 2001 by HarperTeen.

In 2001, the book was a finalist for the Los Angeles Times Book Prize for Young Adult Literature. The following year, it was named one of the top ten Best Books for Young Adults by the American Library Association.

== Plot summary ==
Austin is depressed with the potential for suicide. His best friends are Dobie and Curtis. They all are football players. Austin has issues about the routine he takes to get him to go to school. Their favorite hang out is Dairy Queen. Austin meets Heather. Austin's friends discuss their feelings about heather, how his first date with Heather came about and why they are together.

In chapter 5 they talk about Austin's first away game, and how it plays out.

Chapters 6–9: In this section they go to many places. In chapter 6 they go to a movie and

dinner together, Aus. Austin is there thinking about Heather and asks God to forgive him. In chapter 8 he is at home in his bed dreaming about himself and Heather. Then he goes to school and has practice. After practice they are in a locker room talking. Austin takes Curtis home then takes Heather home because she was waiting for him after practice on the truck. In chapter 9 he is at home and Curtis comes over.

Austin talks about how things are now that he is with Heather. He would drive Dobie rides home after practice, but since he started to date Heather, Curtis now drives him home. Austin after practice now takes Heather to the Dairy Queen instead of his friends and they place their usual order. While eating, they talk about things including what happened between Curits and Kat. Austin tires of Heather always brushing her hair before leaving, but he sums it up as, "This waiting for hair to be brushed – is the price of dating Heather". They sit in the car just hanging out for a while. Heather thinks Austin is mad at her when he really is not and she gito please him also in hopes that he will not be angry any longer. Two weeks later they have sex.

In chapter 11 Austin plays in his sixth game, and Curtis ended messing up. Curtis gets bothered by this and he does not speak for a while. They are gonna go out that night and they invite Austin, but he's going to be to busy with Heather. In chapter 12 Curtis happens to be in the Bull-in-a-Ring since he messed up the game in chapter 11. After Bull-in-a-Ring Austin does not know if he should help his best friend up or do as the coach said and go get ready to do sprints. He goes to do sprints.

In chapter 13 Austin sits in Heather's room and watches her get dressed. They just talk about the usual stuff. Heather asks Austin to pass her a clip when he goes to find it he opened the wrong drawer and she gets mad, Austin stared at the note, it was from her father. Austin tell's her its okay to talk about her father to him, but she does not seem to want to open up. Soon Austin has to leave.

In chapter 14 Austin and Heather get into a little argument, and then when they make up they go off to Dairy Queen. After that Austin wants to "please her" but she takes it the wrong way and goes off on him, and tells him all these mean things that make him depressed. Chapter 15 talks about his ride home; lonely. When he arrives he goes suicidal in the bathroom and is thinking about cutting himself, but Becky his little sister comes to the door with the phone, and it happens to be Heather on the line. She wants to talk so she asks him to go over. He drives back over to her house.

Chapters 16–19: In this section they are still going places. In chapter 16 Austin is at Heather's house and they are talking about what happened the other night. They talk about their pass and Heather cries about her past. In chapter 17 he was just leaving Heather's house they were holding each other and talking at 3:00 in the morning. At the game they won. Austin goes home and cannot sleep. It is Sunday and its 4:30 but he does not have to get up til 8:00. In chapter 18 he is at school and has football practice again. He takes Dobie home, then Heather. Austin goes to Heather's house and she tells him it is over with them. In chapter 19 he is at home in his truck thinking. Then he goes to Curtis' house and talks about himself and Heather.

== Characters ==
- Heather is Austin's future girlfriend, girlfriend, and also ex throughout the book. Heather tends to keep her past to herself. She thinks that Austin is her everything at one point; they are usually spending the most time together throughout the book. She seems to be bi-polar and psychopathic, because she has mood swings out of nowhere at certain points, as when Austin sees the ripped-up note in her basket when he opens the wrong drawer. She also does not like Austin's best-friends which are Dobie, and Curtis.
- Kat is Curtis' ex-girlfriend. There is not much about her in the book, but it does say that Curtis was, and still is, in love with her. She went forward in the relationship and they had sex and everything, then she tried to go back but Curtis had gotten used to it that he was not able to. So they broke up.
- Dobie is one of Austin's best friends along without Curtis of course. He is a football player, and he drinks beer. He does not think Austin should go out with Heather because he feels that she is using him. He does not feel comfortable being around Heather, seen when one day after practice Austin gives him a ride home but he sits in the back of the truck because Heather is in the front.
- Coach, he is the football coach. He is as mean as a starving lion eating a piece of meat. He is not that important, but he creates a game called Bull-in-a-Ring which involves one of the players being in the interior of the circle and the other teammates tackling him down one or two down at a time. A game which could injure one of his players.
- Austin Reid is a football player for his school. His father died when he was 3 years old from cancer. He does not like to talk to his mom about his feelings or his past but a certain point they do have some flashbacks when they are washing the dishes. He will share his feelings and things with his girlfriend, Heather. He has two best friends Curtis and Dobie. They play football with him. He has a pick up truck and drives it ever where he goes. Austin is very suicidal.
- Becky Reid is Austin's little sister. She has a little crush on Curtis but she does not know if he has a crush on her. But when she gets on the phone with another boy he gets a little mad. He gets over it. She fights with her mom like every girl will but she always still does what she says. She thinks she is grown up enough to be able to wear certain types of clothing.
- Ms. Reid is Austin's mom. She really does not say much but tries to talk to her kids about school and their lives. Like when they are in the kitchen in the morning she tries to talk but he really does not want to. He helps her get ready to go to work because she's late. They still have time together. She gets to have a time with Austin and they shared some flashbacks of Austin's past.
- Curtis is Austin's best friend. He can talk to him whenever he needs his help. His friend for life and they are on the football team together, until he quits the team. He does not like Becky, but he is not going to break her little heart. Kat is his ex-girlfriend and he is still in love with her but she is not in love with him.

== Reception ==
Damage received positive reviews from Kirkus and Publishers Weekly. The book also received the following accolades:

- New York Public Library Books for the Teen Age
- American Library Association Best Books for Young Adults Top Ten (2002)
- Bulletin Blue Ribbon (The Bulletin of the Center for Children's Books)
- Booklist Editors' Choice
