= Black Girl You Are Atlas =

2025 poetry collection by Renée Watson

- Author: Renée Watson
- Illustrator: Ekua Holmes
- Publisher: Kokila
- Publication date: February 13, 2024
- Pages: 96
- ISBN: 9780593461709

Black Girl You Are Atlas is a 2024 young adult poetry collection written by Renée Watson and illustrated by Ekua Holmes.

== Summary ==
The book centers of the theme of Black womanhood and includes semi-autobiographical elements. It contains various forms of poems, including free verse, haikus, pantoum, and tanka, alongside collage artwork done by Holmes. The poems include "Turning Seven", about Watson's relationship to her father and uncle, "King”, about Watson's brother, "A Tanka for Michelle Obama", and "A Pantoum for Breonna Taylor", a tribute to Breonna Taylor.

== Audiobook ==
An audiobook adaption narrated by Watson was published on the same day of the print book.

== Reception ==
The book received starred reviews from Bookpage, Kirkus Reviews, and School Library Journal. It was also reviewed by Publishers Weekly.

Awards and honors
Year	Award/Honor	Result	Ref.
2024	Cybil Award – Poetry	Winner	
2025	Walter Dean Myers Award – Teen	Winner	
2025	Coretta Scott King Award – Author	Honor	
2025	Odyssey Award (for audiobook adaption)	Honor	
2025	Rise: A Feminist Book Project	Top Ten	
