= Jay Coles =

American author of young adult fiction

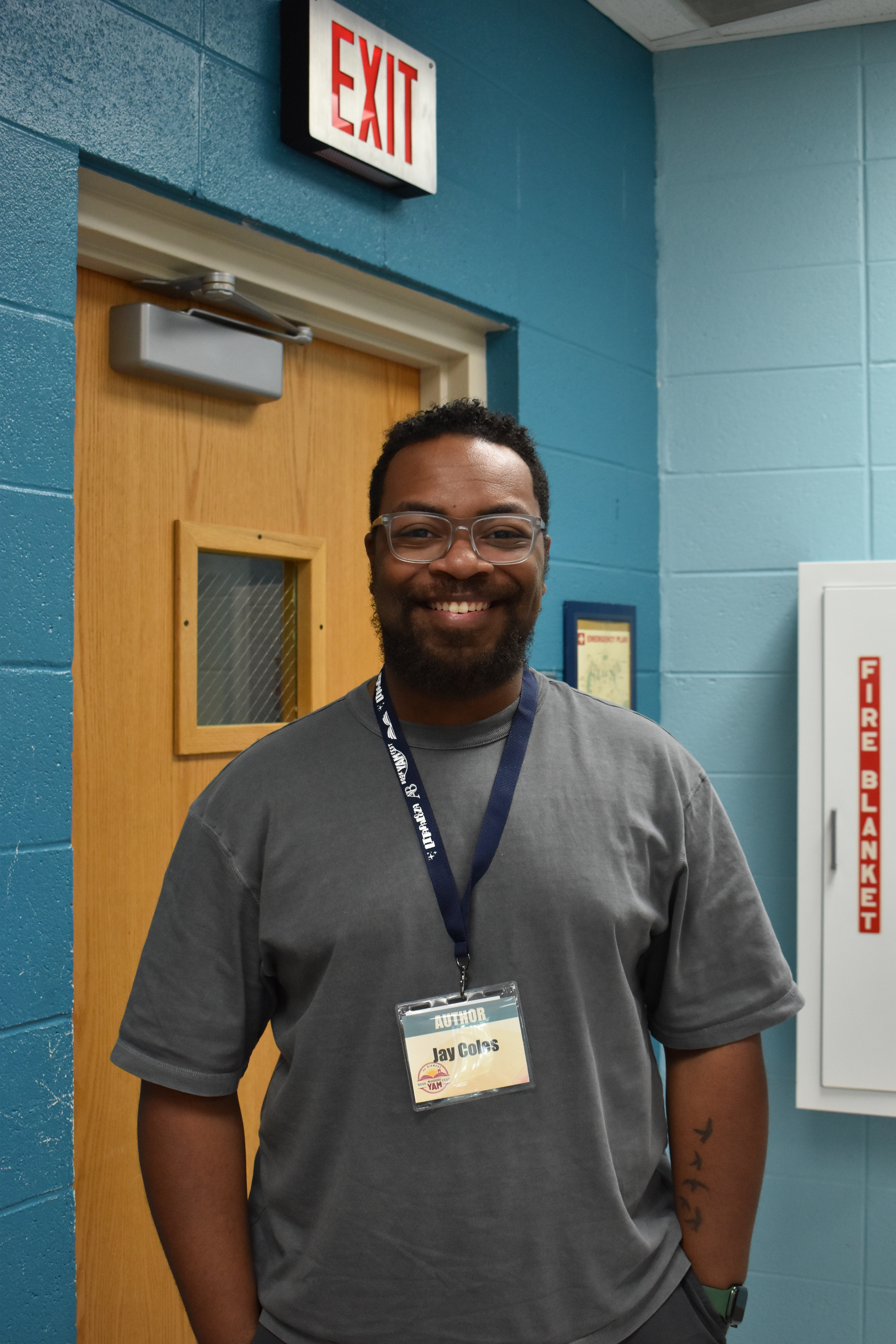
- Coles at the YA Midwest festival on July 26, 2025
- Born: December 17, 1995 (age 30)
- Occupations: author; composer
- Writing career
- Notable work: Black Enough (2019)

Jay Coles (born December 17, 1995) is an American author of young adult fiction and composer of concert band music and member of the American Society of Composers, Authors and Publishers. His debut piece, Orchesis: The Legends of Thailand, premiered in Wakayama-shi, Japan in December 2011. In addition to composing, Jay has written several novels over the years, including the Black Lives Matter-inspired stand-alone, Tyler Johnson Was Here, which was published March 20, 2018 by Little Brown Books for Young Readers.

Jay Cole is also the author of the novel Your Final Moments, published in 2025.

== Biography ==
Coles was born in Indianapolis and raised in the Haughville neighborhood. He is a music composer best known for his works published with Carl Fischer Music and C.L. Barnhouse Company as well as his novel Tyler Johnson Was Here. Jay studied at Vincennes University and Ball State University, respectively, and earned degrees in Liberal Arts, English, and Education. Coles now lives in Muncie, Indiana, where he works for a church Union Chapel as a youth pastor, and continues to write. He is also a math teacher for Northside Middle school in the same city. Jay Coles presented one of his songs in 2011, when he was 15.

== Awards and honors ==
Tyler Johnson Was Here was nominated for the 2018 Goodreads Choice Award for Young Adult Fiction.

The American Library Association included Tyler Johnson was Here (2019) and Black Enough (2020) on their list of Amazing Audiobooks for Young Adults.

== Works ==
=== Musical compositions ===
- Galactic Episode (Concert Band piece) published by Carl Fischer music (2016)
- Insurrection (Concert Band piece) published by C.L. Barnhouse (2016)
- Dystopia (Concert Band Piece)

=== Novels ===
- Things We Couldn't Say. Scholastic Press. 2021. ISBN 9781338734188.
- Tyler Johnson Was Here. Little, Brown Books for Young Readers. 2018. ISBN 9780316440776.
- Outer Banks: Dead Break: An Original Novel Based on the Hit Netflix Series. Amulet Books Abrams Books. 2023. ISBN 9781419761614.

=== Short stories ===
- Zoboi, Ibi, ed. (2019). "Wild Horses, Wild Hearts". Black Enough: Stories of Being Young & Black in America. Balzer + Bray. ISBN 9780062698742.
- Chapman, Elsie; Richmond, Caroline Tung (eds.). "Gimme Some Sugar". Hungry Hearts: 13 Tales of Food & Love. pp. 78–101.
- Mbalia, Kwame, ed. (2021). Black Boy Joy: 17 Stories Celebrating Black Boyhood. Delacorte Books. ISBN 9780593379936.
- Gibaldi, Lauren; Smith, Eric, eds. (2021). "Reckless Love". Battle of the Bands. Candlewick Press. pp. 148–172. ISBN 9781536214338.
