= Voice of Freedom: Fannie Lou Hamer =

2015 non-fiction children's book

- Author: Carole Boston Weatherford
- Illustrator: Ekua Holmes
- Publisher: Candlewick Press
- Publication date: August 4, 2015
- ISBN: 978-0-76-366531-9

Voice of Freedom: Fannie Lou Hamer, The Spirit of the Civil Rights Movement is a 2015 non-fiction and poetic children's book by written by Carole Boston Weatherford and illustrated by Ekua Holmes.

The book discusses the life of American civil rights activist Fannie Lou Hamer (1917–1977). Hamer was born to sharecropper parents in Mississippi, the youngest of 20 children. Although her mother taught her to read, Hamer began working in the cotton fields at age six and dropped out of school at age 12. She later married a sharecropper, and when she learned she could vote, she registered immediately. However, she soon learned about the unfair circumstances surrounding voting in the United States during the Jim Crow era, which led her to advocate for voting rights for African Americans along many others, including the Student Nonviolent Coordinating Committee. In addition to her activism, Hamer had a full life in which she cared for her aging mother, married, and had children, although she was also forcibly sterilized and otherwise brutalized.

Voice of Freedom was well-received by critics and landed on many "best of" lists. It won the 2016 John Steptoe New Talent Illustrator Award was named an honor book for the 2016 Boston Globe–Horn Book Award, Caldecott Medal, and Sibert Medal.

== Style ==
Voice of Freedom is written in a poetic style through a series of standalone free-verse poems that, as a collection, tell Hamer's life story. Booklist's Amina Chaudhri found that the book's poems "stand alone as successfully as they link together".

== Reception ==
=== Reviews ===
Voice of Freedom was well-received by critics, including starred reviews from Booklist, Kirkus Reviews, and School Library Journal.

Booklist's Amina Chaudhri described Voice of Freedom as "bold, unapologetic, and beautiful", while Kirkus Reviews referred to it as "bold, honest, informative, and unforgettable".

According to Chaudri, this "stunning biography" walks readers "beside [Hamer] through tears and smiles on a remarkable journey of resilience and determination that leaves us transformed". Chaudri argued that Weatherford "rendered Hamer’s voice so precisely that it is like sitting at her knee as she tells her story". Kirkus Reviews discussed how the "expansive, richly illustrated biography" includes both joyful moments from Hamer's life, as well as "painful truths", noting that "Hamer’s determination, perseverance, and unwavering resolve come through on every page". Taniguchi similarly found that the "lyrical text in verse emphasizes the activist's perseverance and courage, as she let her booming voice be heard".

Chaudhri also highlighted how "Holmes’ multimedia collages perfectly capture the essence of each poem", noting that, "like Hamer’s life, the illustrations are filled with light, texture, movement, and darkness. They are both abstract and realistic, brilliantly juxtaposing gentle floral motifs with protest placards and Fannie Lou Hamer’s face in bold relief". Kirkus Reviews found that the "quiltlike collage illustrations emphasize the importance Hamer placed on community among African-Americans".

=== Awards and honors ===
Voice of Freedom is a Junior Library Guild book.

The Horn Book Magazine included Voice of Freedom on their list of the best nonfiction books of 2015. The Chicago Public Library included it on their list of the "Best Informational Books for Older Readers of 2015". Bank Street College of Education included it on their list of the best books for children ages nine to twelve.

In 2015, Booklist included Voice of Freedom on their "Booklist Editors' Choice: Books for Youth" list. The following year, they included it on their list of the year's "Top 10 Biographies for Youth". The American Library Association also named it on the Amelia Bloomer List, and the Association for Library Service to Children named it a Notable Children's Book. The International Literacy Association's Children's Literature and Reading Special Interest Group named it among their Notable Books for a Global Society.

Awards for Voice of Freedom
| Year | Award | Result | Ref. |
|---|---|---|---|
| 2016 | Boston Globe–Horn Book Award for Non-fiction | Honor | |
| 2016 | Caldecott Medal for Illustrator | Honor | |
| 2016 | John Steptoe New Talent Illustrator Award | Won | |
| 2016 | Sibert Medal | Honor | |
| 2017 | Audie Award for Young Listeners' Title | Finalist | |

== Adaptations ==
In July 2016, Voice of Freedom was released as a 34-minute video by Dreamscape.

Booklist provided the film a starred review, and included the film on their 2016 "Booklist Editors' Choice: Video" list. According to Candace Smith's review, "Narrator Janina Edwards does a masterful job voicing Hamer" and highlighted how, while "singing a few lyrics of 'This Little Light of Mine,' Edwards embodies Hamer’s triumphant spirit". Smith also noted how "swirling animation adds a dreamy movement to Ekua Holmes’ multimedia collages, which strikingly fit with the poetic language".
