= Love Is a Revolution =

2021 young adult novel by Renée Watson

- First edition cover (publ. Bloomsbury)
- Author: Renée Watson
- Language: English
- Genre: Young adult
- Publisher: Bloomsbury Publishing
- Publication date: February 2, 2021
- Publication place: United States
- Media type: Print (hardcover, paperback), e-book, audiobook
- Pages: 304
- ISBN: 978-1547600601

Love Is a Revolution is a 2021 young adult novel by Renée Watson. The first-person narrative tells the story of Nala, a young, black, and plus-sized girl, exploring love through a romantic relationship while learning to love herself.

== Plot ==
Nala Robertson, the narrator and a soon-to-be senior in high school, has three goals for the summer: find a new hairstyle, spend time with her cousin and best friend, Imani, and find love. After meeting a handsome young man, Tye Brown, at a community group her cousin attends, Nala believes her summer is off to a good start. After telling multiple white lies to fit in with the new boy and the community group, Nala realizes that these lies are impacting her relationship with her cousin and Tye. Imani and Tye are very passionate about social justice issues, and Nala would rather be off enjoying her summer with a movie and ice cream. Her interests create a divide between herself and Tye and Imani. As her relationship with Tye advances, Nala begins to wonder if she can keep up the ruse. Eventually, her true self is exposed to Tye and she has to convince him her feelings are real.

== Analysis ==
=== Representation ===
According to Renée Watson, Love Is a Revolution is a novel unlike other stories with black characters in that it embodies the idea that blackness is not a burden. Watson believes that more books featuring black characters should exemplify everyday life. "When non-Black readers only have books about Black pain, struggle, and tragedy, it can perpetuate stereotypes and cause even the most well-meaning person to see Black people through a lens of pity." This novel highlights inner self-image issues rather than appearance or racial issues that she may face. Watson’s work differs from many other novels by black activist writers in arguing that it is okay to take care of oneself before changing the world.

== Reception ==
Love Is a Revolution received positive reviews from Kirkus Reviews, School Librarian, and the School Library Journal. Reviewers celebrated the novel for how it touches on a variety of subjects that young adults are interested in like activism, racism, and body positivity. Mimi Powell wrote: "The cast of Black characters shines; each character is well-developed and relatable, even when they're not particularly likable." Sandra Bennett claims that Watson stresses the importance of taking care of yourself through “A thoughtful and at the same time entertaining novel; readers will enjoy Nala's disarming honesty as she confronts her own lack of judgement." Kirkus Reviews also described this novel in a similar way: "[T]his story will resonate with readers who have questioned who they are, tried to change themselves to fit in, or are seeking their own voices."
