= Tyrell (novel) =

2006 young adult novel by Coe Booth

- First edition cover (publ. Scholastic)
- Author: Coe Booth
- Publisher: Scholastic Press
- Publication date: October 1, 2006
- Award: Los Angeles Times Book Prize for Young Adult Literature (2006)
- ISBN: 9780439838795

Tyrell is a 2006 young adult novel by Coe Booth. The novel follows the character Tyrell, a 15-year-old African-American boy living in a roach-infested shelter in The Bronx. He dropped out of school with the excuse of helping take care of his 7-year-old brother Troy. At the same time, his mother slightly hints for him to sell drugs to help their family move from a homeless shelter into an apartment. But Tyrell is reluctant given his fear of ending up in prison like his father. Instead, Tyrell plans a neighborhood party to help raise money.

Tyrell won the 2006 Los Angeles Times Book Prize for Young Adult Novel, and Time has included it on their list of the "100 Best Young Adult Books of all Time".

== Reception ==
=== Reviews ===
Tyrell received starred reviews from Booklist and Publishers Weekly.

On behalf of Booklist, Hazel Rochman described Tyrell as "heartbreakingly realistic", though noted "there are some plot contrivances". Publishers Weekly also found the "plot developments realistic".

Rochman found the first-person narration to be "pitch perfect: fast, funny, and anguised". Kirkus Reviews highlighting that Booth "clearly understands how teens living on the edge—in shelters, in projects, on the street—live, talk and survive". Reviewers found that part of the novel's realism came from the language Tyrell and others in the novel used. Publishers Weekly noted that "Tyrell's frank talk about sex may be offensive for some readers, but only adds to his character's credibility". Rochman similarly mentioned "there’s also lots of use of the n-word, though the term is employed in the colloquial sense, not as an insult".

=== Awards and honors ===
Tyrell won the Los Angeles Times Book Prize for Young Adult Novel for books published in 2006.

In 2007, the American Library Association (ALA) included the novel on their 2007 lists of Quick Picks for Reluctant Young Adult Readers and Best Books for Young Adults. Booklist included it on their list of the "Top 10 First Novels for Youth" published in 2007. Time has also included Tyrell on their list of the "100 Best YA Books of all Time".

Despite these honors, the ALA's Office for Intellectual Freedom has indicated that Tyrell has been frequently banned and challenged in the United States.
