= The Magic Fish =

2020 graphic novel by Trung Le Nguyen

- Author: Trung Le Nguyen
- Illustrator: Trung Le Nguyen
- Language: English
- Genre: Graphic novel
- Publisher: Random House Graphic
- Publication date: October 13, 2020
- Pages: 256
- Awards: Harvey Awards
- ISBN: 978-0-593-12529-8

The Magic Fish is a semi-autobiographical graphic novel written and illustrated by Trung Le Nguyen. The novel tells the story of Tiến Phong, a second generation American Vietnamese teenager, who helps his mother learn English through fairy tales while struggling to tell her about his sexuality.

Nguyen's debut graphic novel was published in 2020 by Random House Graphic, an imprint of Penguin Random House. Nguyen was nominated for an Eisner Award for his work, and the book was shortlisted for the British Fantasy Award, GLAAD Media Award and Lambda Literary Award.

== Synopsis ==
The book is separated into three fairytales with the main story about a son and his mother woven through.

Tiến Phong, a young Vietnamese boy born in America, practices English with his mother Helen, or of her Vietnamese name Hiến, by reading fairy tales together. The first fairy tale is an adaptation of Tattercoats and Allerleirauh, it tells the story of a young girl sold to an old mythical man from the sea by her father. She runs away with the help of her aunt. She ends up hired at a castle as a kitchen errand boy and forms a relationship with the prince of the castle as his best friend. She attends balls in secret, and the prince unknowingly falls in love with her. It is a pretty straightforward European tale with some Vietnamese influence. In the main story, Tiến struggles to come out as gay to his friend, Julian, who he has a crush on, and his parents, fearing they will react poorly. His mom learns of her mother's worsening health. Helen feels guilty for not being in Vietnam to support her mom and her family. This leads her to remember her immigration journey with her husband. This section ends with Helen receiving a phone call announcing her mother's death.

Helen leaves for Vietnam alone to attend her mother's funeral. She spends time with her aunt, and talks to her about her struggles with her identity as Vietnamese, feeling like she is losing her language and forgetting her culture. Helen also confides that she is worried that her mom was mad that she left Vietnam. In response, her aunt tells her the second fairy tale. It's a tale by the name of Tấm Cám, often considered the Vietnamese version of Cinderella, unfolding in the '50s. It follows the tale of a young girl, Tấm, bullied by her stepmother and stepsister, treated as a servant after her father's death. One day, Tấm finds a talking fish in her fountain and quickly befriends it. Her stepmother, bothered by Tấm's sudden happiness, investigates and discovers the fish. She invites Tấm to eat with her, and reveals the food was made with her only friend, the talking fish. Word comes to the household that a wealthy young merchant is looking for a wife. The stepmother gives Tấm the impossible chore of dividing rice to stop her from going to the ball. But, with the help of a talking bird and the spirit of her fish, she is able to go to the ball. The merchant notices her beauty and falls in love. Tấm loses one of her slippers and the merchant uses it to find her again. He marries her, rescuing her from her stepmother. On the anniversary of her father's death, Tấm visits her old household and is murdered by her jealous stepmother. The stepmother buries her under a tree, and fakes concern when the merchant comes searching for his missing wife. Grieving, the merchant dreams of a tree and his wife. When he wakes up, Tấm is back by his side. The tale ends with the talking bird tricking the stepsister into boiling herself. He then tricks the stepmother into eating her daughter's boiled remains.

She achieves some kind of peace after her aunt's tale. At the same time, Tiến is struggling at school and distancing himself from his friends. He ends up making up with both of his friends, Julian and Claire, at the school's ball and comes out to Julian. Julian tells him that he already knew, and that he himself is not gay. They laugh together. Tiến's teacher notices the boys' closeness. The teacher sets up an "intervention" for Tiến after school. His teacher and a priest push him to keep his sexuality hidden, so as not to "break his parents' hearts". Helen comes back to the United States.

Helen notices Tiến is keeping something from her, so she instructs Tiến to begin telling the third fairytale, a retelling of The Little Mermaid. A young mermaid saves a human named Brandon and falls in love. She sacrifices her voice for feet and dancer-like grace, although her feet are very painful. She is also told that she must find true love on the surface, or else she will be stuck in the ocean forever. She finds Brandon again, who introduces her to his friend, Bertie. In the main story, Helen gets called to school to have a meeting with the priest and teacher about Tiến. They come back home in silence and Helen continues reading the tale. The mermaid and Bertie are cast as the two leads in a ballet. The mermaid gets jealous of the close relationship between Bertie and Brandon. After the show, Brandon asks to speak with Bertie. Once they leave, the mermaid has a vision of her sisters, they tell her that they made a deal with the witch, where if the little mermaid kills Brandon, then she can be a mermaid again. As she seemingly chose not to. Bertie comes back. Bertie says that Brandon asked her to marry him but that she hopes to be with someone else, a girl. The mermaid says yes and they kiss. Back to Tiến and his mother, he is crying and she tells him that she loves him and that she wants to see him grow up no matter what.

== Style ==
One aspect noted by reviewers in Trung Le Nguyen's graphic novel is the use of different colors to "distinguish each storyline." Kirkus Reviews called it "a road map for readers", with the three colors being used to highlight whether the current panel is "set in the present, the past, or within the fairy tale." Nguyen uses the color red for panels in the present, yellow for those in the past, and purple for panels representing fairy tales, filling the panels with those colors.

== Background ==
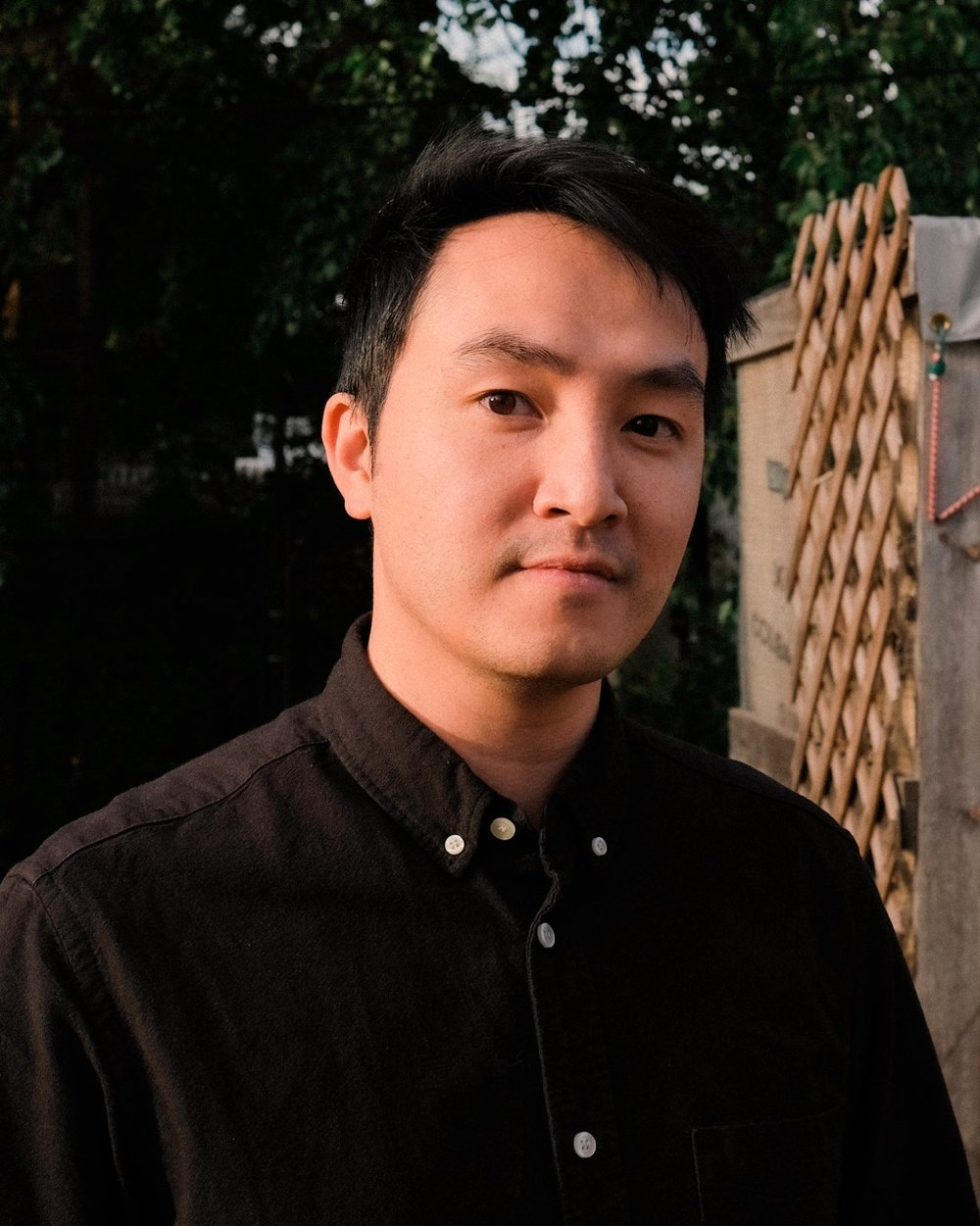
Author and illustrator Trung Le Nguyen

The story told in The Magic Fish is partially based on the author's life. Nguyen was born in a refugee camp and moved to the United States with his parents, where they learned English together, which included reading fairy tales. Throughout Nguyen's graphic novel, three fairy tales are shared by the main characters. The first two tales told in The Magic Fish are "Cinderella" stories, and were chosen by the author to highlight the different backgrounds of the son and mother characters. The third fairy tale is Hans Christian Andersen's "The Little Mermaid".

== Reception ==
The Magic Fish received a starred review from Kirkus Reviews, which noted Trung Le Nguyen's skill at mixing Vietnamese and Westerns fairy tales in his story, while connecting that to the main character's "struggle over coming out." The reviewer also praises the art, saying Le Nguyen's "clever use of color smooths the way for the sophisticated embedding of stories within a story", the technique which is used to highlight "the complex dynamics between first-generation and second-generation family members." Terry Hong, reviewing for The Booklist, called it a "homage to the infinite power of storytelling." A review published on Good Comics for Kidscalled the story "impeccable" and praised Nguyen's art style.

In a review for The Horn Book Magazine, Jerry Dear calls The Magic Fish an "imaginative graphic novel", and noted Nguyen's use of "[p]astel shades of red, brown, and purple" to change between the various stories being told in parallel. Publishers Weekly also praised the author's use of different colors to signify a different layer of reality, and ended the review by saying "Nguyen’s poignant debut captures the perspectives of, and essence of the bond between, a parent and child". The New York Times published a review by Jen Wang, in which she calls Nguyen "a gifted storyteller". Wang proceeds to explain how the author uses the medium of graphic novels and fairy tales to emphasize different emotions, such as "romance or melancholy", and cultures, and finalizes her review by calling the novel "especially inventive."

=== Awards ===
Nguyen was nominated for an Eisner Award in the Best Writer/Artist category for his work in The Magic Fish, and won the 2021 Harvey Award for Book of the Year. Additionally, the novel was shortlisted for the Best Comic/Graphic Novel category of the British Fantasy Awards, the GLAAD Media Award for Outstanding Comic Book, and the 33rd Lambda Literary Awards for Young Adult Literature. The Italian translation, Magic fish. Le storie del pesce magico, won the 2023 Romics Award for Best Children's Book and was a finalist for the 2022 Mare di Libri Awards. The French translation was a Youth Selection at the 2023 Angoulême International Comics Festival.
