= Angelica and the Bear Prince =

2025 graphic novel by Trung Le Nguyen

- Page count: 224 pages
- Publisher: Random House Graphic

Creative team
- Colorist: Angela Phu
- Creator: Trung Le Nguyen

Original publication
- Date of publication: October 7, 2025
- Language: English
- ISBN: 9781984892669

Angelica and the Bear Prince is a graphic novel by Trung Le Nguyen. It follows Angelica, a teen girl who develops a crush on a costumed performer in a East of the Sun and West of the Moon-inspired play and seeks to learn their identity. It was released on October 7, 2025 by Random House Graphic. It won the 2025 Los Angeles Times Book Prize for Young Adult Literature.

== Plot ==
Angelica Hoang, a teenage Vietnamese-American girl suffering from burnout and grief over her grandmother's death, finds solace in texting the anonymous person who portrays Per, the polar bear mascot of the local theater and the star of its popular play based on East of the Sun and West of the Moon, segments of which are interspersed with the main story throughout the book. After getting a job at the theater, she develops a crush on the mascot, and seeks to learn the identity of the person behind the costume. She tells her friend Christine about their messaging, and Christine reveals she has been chosen to play the role of the princess opposite to Per. Meanwhile, Angelica's mother, who runs a food stand outside the theater, fears her relationship with her daughter is becoming strained as she grows up.

Angelica goes to see a practice of the play and blushes when Per is onstage. When Per's performer goes backstage after the practice, he reveals to Killian, a member of the crew, that is he is actually Gable, a trans boy who was friends with Angelica as a child but moved away with his mother after his parents' divorce. He recently moved in with his grandmother Phoebe Jorgenson, who is the founder of the theater and whose late husband was both the original actor for Per the Bear and the creator of the costume. Gable is nervous about revealing himself as Per to Angelica due to accidentally knocking her over earlier while out of costume. At the same time, Christine tries to hang out with her boyfriend Chip, but he brushes her off to hang out with his friends. Later that night, Angelica and her mother get in a fight while driving home, while Gable and his grandmother talk about his grandfather.

A few practices later, Gable works up the courage to reveal himself as Per to Angelica, and the two meet at a bridge. However, when Angelica tries removing the costume's head she accidentally drops into the river. Gable's furious grandmother threatens to fire Angelica unless she can replace the head in three days. Meanwhile, Christine discovers Chip is cheating on her after seeing him at a restaurant with another girl, and along with Angelica and Angelica's mother she confronts and breaks up with him.

With help from her parents, Christine, theater manager Clarissa, and her parents' friend Mr. Nielsen and his husband Mr. Macnamara, Angelica is able to make a new bear head. She and her mother make up. Gable talks to his grandmother about the costume, and they have a heart-to-heart, with her admitting that she saw the costume as a connection to her late husband. She then drives to Angelica's home and apologizes for getting mad at her. With the new head done, the play goes on successfully, and the book ends with Angelica and Gable getting together.

== Reception ==
Angelica and the Bear Prince received starred reviews from Kirkus Reviews and Publishers Weekly. Kirkus Reviews stated the novel "tenderly explores difficult emotional topics like anxiety and long-lasting grief." It was also positively reviewed by the School Library Journal, which called it a "lovely look at burnout, grief, and coming-of-age with just a dash of teenage romance as a treat."

=== Accolades ===
| Year | Award/Honor | Result | Ref. |
|---|---|---|---|
| 2026 | Eisner Award for Best Publication for Teens | Shortlisted | |
| 2026 | Harvey Award for Best Young Adult Book | Shortlisted | |
| 2026 | Ringo Award for Best Kids Comic or Graphic Novel - Ages 12 and Up | Shortlisted | |
| 2025 | Los Angeles Times Book Prize for Young Adult Literature | Won | |
| 2025 | The Beat's Best Kids Comics | Included | |
| 2025 | Kirkus Reviews - Best Young Adult Books | Included | |
| 2025 | New York Public Library - Best Books for Teens | Included | |
