= Monstrous: A Transracial Adoption Story =

2023 graphic memoir by Sarah Myer

- Date: June 27, 2023
- Publisher: First Second

Creative team
- Creator: Sarah Myer
- ISBN: 9781250268792

Monstrous: A Transracial Adoption Story is a graphic memoir by Sarah Myer, published in 2023 by First Second. It covers Myer's experiences growing up as a Korean-American interracial adoptee.

== Synopsis ==
The book covers Myer's youth starting from early childhood. Myer and their adoptive sister Lily were born in South Korea and internationally adopted at a young age by white parents in a rural Maryland community with a primarily white population. As Sarah grew up, they dealt with racist and homophobic bullying, often turning to creating art and engaging in fandoms like Teenage Mutant Ninja Turtles and various manga to cope. The book also covers Myer's questioning of their sexuality and gender. Myer, who uses they/them pronouns, uses she/her in the book when depicting their younger self.

== Development ==
The book was based on Myer's Master of Fine Arts thesis "Drafting Self-Identity: Transracial Adoption in Comics"

== Reception ==
School Library Journal, The Horn Book, and Kirkus Reviews all gave Monstrous starred reviews. Kirkus Reviews commented on how the art depicted "themes of anxiety and self-image... contrasting the more minimalist drawing style in fairly neutral tones with dramatically shaded and dynamic panels," and concluded that the book was a "beautifully depicted emotional journey."

Publishers Weekly said "those wrestling with feelings of disconnect from their communities will find validation in this confessional read."

D. Morris of The Beat included it on the website's list of the 34 Best Comics of 2023, noting the book's positive portrayal of fandom by saying "an alternate title for Monstrous could be Fandom Saved My Life."

=== Accolades ===
Year	Award/Honor	Category	Result	Ref.
2024	Eisner Award	Best Publication for Teens	Shortlisted	
2024	Los Angeles Times Book Prize	Young Adult Novel	Shortlisted	
2024	Young Adult Library Services Association	Great Graphic Novels for Teens	Top Ten	
2023	School Library Journal Best Books of the Year	Best Graphic Novels	Included	
2023	New York Public Library Best Books of the Year	Best Books for Teens	Top Ten	
