= Coe Booth =

American fiction writer

- Born: New York City, U.S.
- Occupation: Writer
- Writing career
- Period: 2006-present
- Notable works: Tyrell, Kendra, Bronxwood, Kinda Like Brothers
- Website: coebooth.com

Coe Booth is an American fiction writer. Her first novel, Tyrell, was released in 2006. It is written for young adolescents.

== Biography ==
Booth was born on March 21 in New York City. She grew up in the Bronx.

Booth graduated from college in 1996 with a BA and MA in psychology. She worked as a social worker in New York City Emergency Children's Service. In 2005, she attended The New School for General Studies in New York where she completed a Master of Fine Arts program in creative writing. In 2005, Booth completed her first novel, Tyrell. Her inspiration for this book came from her experience working with the troubled teenagers of New York.

Booth is a full-time writer and part-time college professor at a Bronx Community College. She teaches English. Booth also volunteers for the NAACP ACT-SO program where she mentors teenage writers. She lives in Basel, Switzerland as a writer-in-residence at Laurenz Haus.

== Awards and honors ==
Three of Booth's books are Junior Library Guild selections: Bronxwood (2011), Kinda Like Brothers (2014) and Caprice (2022).

Tyrell won the Los Angeles Times Book Prize for Young Adult Novel for books published in 2006. In 2007, the American Library Association (ALA) included Tyrell on their list of Quick Picks for Reluctant Young Adult Readers and Best Books for Young Adults. Booklist included it on their list of the top ten First Novels for Youth. Time has also included Tyrell on their list of the "100 Best YA Books of all Time". Despite these honors, the ALA's Office for Intellectual Freedom has indicated that Tyrell has been frequently banned and challenged in the United States.

In 2012, the ALA included Bronxwood on their list of Best Fiction for Young Adults. They also named it a top ten selection for their Quick Picks for Reluctant Young Adult Readers list.

In 2015, the Association for Library Service to Children (ALSC) included Kinda Like Brothers on their list of the year's Notable Children's Books, and Bank Street College of Education included it on their list of the year's best books for children ages 12 to 14.

In 2019, Booklist included Black Enough on their top ten list of "Diverse Fiction for Youth". The following year, the Young Adult Library Services Association included it on their Amazing Audiobooks for Young Adults and Quick Picks for Reluctant Young Adult Readers lists.

In 2022, the Black Caucus of the American Library Association and the Chicago Public Library named Caprice one of the year's best children's books. The following year, the ALSC included Caprice on their list of Notable Children's Books.

== Publications ==
=== Novels ===
- Tyrell. Ragged Bears Publishing Limited. 2006. ISBN 9780439838795.
- Kendra. PUSH. 2010. ISBN 9780439925372.
- Bronxwood. Push. 2011. ISBN 9780439925341.
- Kinda Like Brothers. Push. 2014. ISBN 9780545224963.
- Caprice. Scholastic Inc. 2022. ISBN 9780545933346.

=== Short stories ===
- Zoboi, Ibi, ed. (2019). "Gravity". Black Enough: Stories of Being Young & Black in America. Balzer + Bray. ISBN 9780062698742.
- This is Push: New Voices from The Edge. Push. 2007. ISBN 9780439890281.
