= Renée Watson (author) =

American author of children's books (born 1978)

- Watson in 2026
- Born: July 29, 1978 (age 48); Paterson, New Jersey, U.S.
- Occupations: Writer; teacher
- Writing career
- Years active: 2010–present
- Genres: Young adult; picture books; middle grade
- Notable work: Piecing Me Together (2017); The 1619 Project: Born on the Water (2021); Love Is a Revolution (2022); All the Blues in the Sky (2025)
- Notable awards: Coretta Scott King Award (2018); Josette Frank Award (2018); Newbery Honor (2018); Newbery Medal (2025)
- Website: reneewatson.net

Renée Watson (born July 29, 1978) is an American teaching artist and author of children's books, including her children's novel All the Blues in the Sky and young adult novel Piecing Me Together, for which she received the John Newbery Honor, Coretta Scott King Award, and Josette Frank Award. Watson founded the nonprofit I, Too, Arts Collective to provide creative arts programs to the Harlem community. She is a member of the Wintergreen Women Writers Collective.

== Early life ==
Watson was born in Paterson, New Jersey, and grew up in northeast Portland, Oregon, after her parents' divorce. Her mother's family is originally from West Virginia. Watson attended Vernon Elementary School, Binnsmead Middle School, and Jefferson High School in Portland. She was a member of Antioch Missionary Baptist Church, where she recited poetry on holidays and special occasions. She loved poetry from a young age and read the work of poets like Maya Angelou and Langston Hughes. Sandra Cisneros' The House on Mango Street was one of the formative works of her childhood.

Watson was interested in writing and was encouraged to pursue this by her teachers and family. In middle school she wrote her first play, which her school produced as their spring show. While in high school she participated in a mentorship and has since returned to mentor others at her former high school. As a senior she also assisted in teaching poetry to underclassmen.

Watson describes herself as a teaching artist, having spent twenty years teaching poetry and theater before becoming a novelist. She moved to New York in 2005 where she attended The New School to study creative writing and art therapy. While she was in school she published her first book.

== Career ==
=== Teaching ===
Watson has spent over 20 years as a teaching artist throughout the United States. She has partnered with outside organizations to lead workshops and been an artist-in-residence at various schools. She has taught poetry at DreamYard, a Bronx-based youth educational nonprofit, and is a member of the DreamYard Board of Directors. Additionally, Watson has run poetry and theater workshops that aim to help children deal with trauma. Watson was a writer-in-residence at Literary Arts, Inc., and mentored students at Schools and Self Enhancement, a Portland-based nonprofit organization that works with underprivileged youth in the North Portland area.

=== Writing ===
Watson's first children's book, A Place Where Hurricanes Happen, was published on June 22, 2010, and is a product of her nonprofit work in New Orleans after Hurricane Katrina. Watson's second picture book, Harlem's Little Blackbird: The Story of Florence Mills, was published onOctober 23, 2012, and received multiple awards and nominations.

Watson's young adult novels include This Side of Home (2015), Piecing Me Together (2017), and Watch Us Rise (2019). Her poem "Black Like Me" was published by Rethinking Schools. Ways to Make Sunshine, a middle-grade novel, was published on April 28, 2020.

Watson performed Roses are Red Women are Blue, a one-woman show, at the Lincoln Center in New York City.

In January 2026, Watson was awarded the Newbery Medal for her novel All the Blues in the Sky, which the committee cited for its "outstanding contribution to children's literature."

== I, Too, Arts Collective ==
When Watson first moved to New York and explored Harlem landmarks, she was disappointed to learn that the former home of Harlem Renaissance author Langston Hughes was not open to the public. In 2016, after growing concerned that the historical home may be lost to gentrification, Watson found the current owner and shared her vision to open up the home to visitors. The owner agreed if Watson could afford to lease the brownstone, and in just 30 days, Watson raised the necessary money by starting the fundraising campaign #LangstonsLegacy.

Watson founded the I, Too, Arts Collective named after the famous Langston Hughes' poem, "I, Too." The board of the nonprofit decided that Hughes' former brownstone should not be turned into a museum, but should be a creative space for the Harlem community. Since opening the space to the public in 2017, the collective provides creative arts programs such as poetry workshops and drum classes for children and adults. They also host a range of literary events such as book launch parties and readings.

Watson originally hoped to raise enough money to buy the landmark and renovate the second floor. She wanted to provide fellowships for out-of-town artists to stay in the house in exchange for providing creative workshops to the community.

On November 4, 2019, The I, Too, Arts Collective announced on their website that they would be closing when their lease ended on December 31, 2019. They were unable to come to a new lease agreement with the owner. Their digital archives remain available on their website.

== Selected works ==
Watson's first picture book A Place Where Hurricanes Happen was inspired by her work with students who had experienced Hurricane Katrina. After working with the kids to create their own poetry she wrote this book which follows four kids as they tell about life before, during, and after Hurricane Katrina. She initially wrote it as part of a creative writing assignment while at The New School and was encouraged to publish it by her professor.

Watson's second young adult novel, Piecing Me Together, was published by Bloomsbury in 2017. It tells the story of Jade, a poor African-American teenager at a predominantly white Portland, Oregon high school who struggles with the prejudice of the people surrounding her. It debuted at number nine on the New York Times young adult hardcover bestseller list on March 18, 2018. It also received several starred reviews, won the Coretta Scott King Author Award and the Bank Street Children's Book Committee's Josette Frank Award for fiction, and was a Newbery Honor Book. Watson's relationships with the black women she knew growing up and a 2014 NAACP report exploring struggles exclusive to African-American girls inspired her to write this novel.

Together with the subject's daughter, Ilyasah Shabazz, she co-authored Betty Before X, a fictionalized account of civil rights leader Dr. Betty Shabazz's life in 1945 Detroit prior to meeting Malcolm X.

Watson's third young adult novel, Watch Us Rise, about two best friends who start a women's rights club in their high school, was published by Bloomsbury in 2019. It's co-written with author Ellen Hagan.

For both her first picture book A Place Where Hurricanes Happen and her latest middle grade novel Some Places More Than Others, Watson worked with illustrator Shadra Strickland.

== Awards and honors ==
The Bank Street College of Education has named 13 of Watson's books the best of the year:

- What Momma Left Me (2011)
- A Place Where Hurricanes Happen (2011)
- Harlem's Little Blackbird (2013)
- This Side of Home (2016)
- Piecing Me Together (2018)
- Betty Before X (2019)
- Black Enough (2019)
- Some Places More Than Others (2020)
- Ways to Make Sunshine (2020)
- The 1619 Project: Born on the Water (2022)
- Love Is a Revolution (2022)
- T (2022)
- Every Body Shines (2022)

Bank Street further indicated that Piecing Me Together (2018), Betty Before X (2019), Black Enough (2019), and T (2022) had "outstanding merit".

Piecing Me Together was a New York Times Best Seller.

In 2021, Barnes & Noble and Publishers Weekly included The 1619 Project on their lists of the best picture books of the year.

The same year, Booklist included Love is a Revolution on their Booklist Editors' Choice: Books for Youth and Top 10 Romance for Youth lists.

In 2022, Booklist included Maya's Song on their Booklist Editors' Choice: Books for Youth and "Top 10 Biographies & Memoirs for Youth" lists.

The audiobook for Black Girl You Are Atlas, which was both written and narrated by Watson, was honored in the 2025 Odyssey Awards.

Awards for Watson's writing
Year	Title	Award	Result	Ref.
2017	Piecing Me Together	Los Angeles Times Book Prize for Young Adult Novel	Finalist	
2018	Piecing Me Together	Coretta Scott King Award	Winner	
2018	Piecing Me Together	Jane Addams Children's Book Award	Honor	
2018	Piecing Me Together	Josette Frank Award	Winner	
2018	Piecing Me Together	Newbery Medal	Honor	
2020	Piecing Me Together	Rebecca Caudill Young Readers' Book Award	Finalist	
2021	The 1619 Project	Barnes & Noble Book of the Year Award	Finalist	
2024	Black Girl You Are Atlas	Cybil Award for Poetry	Winner	
2025	Black Girl You Are Atlas	Walter Dean Myers Award – Teen	Winner	
2025	Black Girl You Are Atlas	Coretta Scott King Award	Honored	
2025	Black Girl You Are Atlas	Odyssey Award	Honored	
2025	Black Girl You Are Atlas	Rise: A Feminist Book Project	Top Ten	
2026	All the Blues in the Sky	Newbery Medal	Winner	

== Bibliography ==
=== Picture books ===
- A Place Where Hurricanes Happen. Illustrated by Shadra Strickland. Random House Books for Young Readers. 2010. ISBN 9780375856099.
- Harlem's Little Blackbird: The Story of Florence Mills. Random House Books for Young Readers. 2012. ISBN 9780375869730.
- The 1619 Project: Born on the Water. Co-written with Nikole Hannah-Jones, illustrated by Nikkolas Smith. Penguin Young Readers. 2021. ISBN 9780593307359.
- Maya's Song. Illustrated by Bryan Collier. HarperCollins. 2022. ISBN 9780062871589.

=== Adult novels ===
- skin & bones. Little, Brown and Company. 2024. ISBN 9780316570886.

=== Young adult novels ===
- This Side of Home. Bloomsbury Children's Books. 2015. ISBN 9781599906683.
- Piecing Me Together. Bloomsbury. 2017. ISBN 9781681191058.
- Watch Us Rise. Co-written with Ellen Hagan. Bloomsbury. 2019. ISBN 9781547600083.
- Love Is a Revolution. Bloomsbury. 2021. ISBN 9781547600601.
- Black Girl You Are Atlas. Kokila. 2024. ISBN 9780593461709.

=== Middle grade novels ===
- What Momma Left Me. Bloomsbury Children's Books. 2010. ISBN 9781599904467.
- Betty Before X. Co-written with Ilyasah Shabazz. Farrar, Straus and Giroux. 2018. ISBN 9780374306106.
- Some Places More Than Others. Bloomsbury Children's Books. 2019. ISBN 9781681191089.
- She Persisted: Oprah Winfrey. Philomel Books. 2021. ISBN 9780593115985.

==== Ryan Hart series ====
The Ryan Hart books are illustrated by Niña Mata and published by Bloomsbury Children's Books.

- Watson, Renée (2020). Ways to Make Sunshine. Bloomsbury USA. ISBN 9781547600564.
- Watson, Renée (2021). Ways to Grow Love. Bloomsbury USA. ISBN 9781547600588.
- Watson, Renée (2022). Ways to Share Joy. Bloomsbury USA. ISBN 9781547609093.
- Watson, Renée (2023). Ways to Build Dreams. Bloomsbury USA. ISBN 9781547610181.

=== Contributions ===
- Marshall, Elizabeth A.; Sensoy, Özlem, eds. (2011). "The Murder of Sean Bell". Rethinking Popular Culture and Media. Rethinking Schools. pp. 304–311. ISBN 9780942961485.
- Watson, Dyan; Christensen, Linda, eds. (2015). Rhythm and Resistance: Teaching Poetry for Social Justice. Rethinking Schools. ISBN 9780942961614.
- Phelps, Ethel Johnston (2017). "Introduction". The Hunter Maiden: Feminist Folktales from Around the World. Illustrated by Suki Boynton. Feminist Press. ISBN 9781558614345.
- Edim, Gloria (2018). "Space to Move Around In". Well-Read Black Girl: Finding Our Stories, Discovering Ourselves. Ballantine Books. pp. 65–74. ISBN 9780525619789.
- Zoboi, Ibi, ed. (2019). "Half a Moon". Black Enough: Stories of Being Young & Black in America. Balzer + Bray. ISBN 9780062698742.
- Manfredi, Angie, ed. (2019). "The Story of My Body". The (Other) F Word: A Celebration of the Fat and Fierce. Amulet Books. ISBN 9781419737503.
- Hudson, Wade; Hudson, Cheryl Willis, eds. (2020). "Remember This". The Talk: Conversations About Race, Love & Truth. Illustrated by Shadra Strickland. Random House Children's Books. pp. 1–6. ISBN 9780593121634.
- Newbould, Cassandra, ed. (2021). "Letting Go". Every Body Shines: Sixteen Stories About Living Fabulously Fat. Bloomsbury Publishing.
- Hughes, Langston (2021). "Foreword". In Roessel, David; Rampersad, Arnold (eds.). Poetry for Young People: Langston Hughes. Illustrated by Benny Andrews. Union Square Kids. ISBN 9781454943754.
