= The Stuff of Stars =

2018 children's picture book by Marion Dane Bauer

- Author: Marion Dane Bauer
- Illustrator: Ekua Holmes
- Cover artist: Holmes
- Language: English
- Genre: Children's picture book
- Published: 2018
- Publication place: United States of America
- Media type: Print (hardback)
- Pages: 40 (unpaginated)
- ISBN: 978-0-7636-7883-8

The Stuff of Stars is a children's picture book written by Marion Dane Bauer and illustrated by Ekua Holmes. It was published in 2018 by Candlewick Press. It explains the Big Bang and evolution and tells children how they are connected to the great big universe. It won The Coretta Scott King Illustrator Award in 2019.

== Synopsis ==
This children's book describes the origin of the universe in illustrious verse. It tells a story about the Big Bang and about the creation of the Earth. It finally tells about the creation of people and about how we are made from the same materials and miracles of the universe and the stars.

== Reception ==
This won the Coretta Scott King Illustrator Award in 2019. The illustrations are colorful and narrative, with a unique style that characterizes both the pictures and the verse with their bold colors and shapes. Kirkus Review described the illustrations saying, "Holmes' digitally assembled hand-marbled paper-collage illustrations perfectly pair with the text." This book was also named one of the best picture books of 2018 by The Washington Post and by BookPage: America's Book Review. Rosemary Kiladitis said, "this book leaves me feeling small, yet overflowing with gratitude, every time I read it." Kirkus Review is quoted as saying, "It's a stunning achievement to present to readers the factual events that created the birth of the universe, the planet earth, and life on earth with such expressive, powerful creativity." Laurie Hertzel from the Star Tribune described it saying, "her words convey a feeling of awe as she connects the reader to all living creatures and all of the universe."
