= Punching the Air =

2020 novel by Ibi Zoboi and Yusef Salaam

- Author: Ibi Zoboi; Yusef Salaam
- Language: English
- Genre: Young adult fiction
- Published: 2020
- Media type: Print (hardback)
- Pages: 400
- ISBN: 978-0-06-299648-0
- OCLC: 1162850257

Punching the Air is a young adult novel-in-verse by Ibi Zoboi and Dr. Yusef Salaam, published September 1, 2020 by Balzer + Bray.

The book is a New York Times best seller and Junior Library Guild book. It has also won the Los Angeles Times Book Prize for Young Adult Literature and the Walter Dean Myers Award.

== Background ==
Zoboi and Salaam met at Hunter College in 1999, two years before Salaam was exonerated for allegedly assaulting and raping a woman in Manhattan's Central Park. Although Punching the Air is not based on Salaam's experience of racial profiling, “Amal’s character is inspired by him as an artist and as an incarcerated teen who had the support of his family, read lots of books, and made art to keep his mind free.”

Zoboi and Salaam decided to write the novel in verse to mirror Amal's connection to poetry, as well as to incorporate the concept of hip-hop, which Salaam refers to as "a genre that was created by us for us. It is the language of the people. It is a protest language. It is a way that we codify the more powerful and salient ideas. Poetry can capture a feeling and when it's being read or spoken, it's magnetic."

== Reception ==
Punching the Air is a New York Times best seller and Junior Library Guild book.

The book received starred reviews from Booklist, Publishers Weekly, Kirkus Reviews, Shelf Awareness, and School Library Journal, as well as positive reviews from Common Sense Media, USA Today, The School Librarian, The Bulletin of the Center for Children's Books, and The Horn Book.

Booklist's Reinhardt Suarez wrote about how Salaam's "experiences lend a visceral gravitas to Zoboi’s pen, and together they capture Amal’s emotional struggles as he grasps for hope despite his circumstances." Suarez also noted that Salaam's experience allowed Zoboi to "accurately depict the justice system as an engine fine-tuned to crush the urban poor and young Black men in particular," ultimately calling the novel "[p]rescient and sobering."

Kirkus called the book, "Awardworthy. Soul-stirring. A must-read."

In a positive review for Booklist, Terry Hong complimented the audiobook narrator, Ethan Herrise, for how he "embodies the novel in verse" with "careful, thoughtful precision."

Kirkus Reviews, TIME, Shelf Awareness, School Library Journal, the New York Public Library, and Publishers Weekly named Punching the Air one of the best young adult books of 2020.

Awards and accolades for Punching the Air
Year	Award / Accolade	Result	Ref.
2020	Goodreads Choice Award for Young Adult Fiction	Finalist	
2020	Los Angeles Times Book Prize for Young Adult Literature	Winner	
2021	Association for Library Service to Children's Notable Children's Recordings	Selection	
2021	Boston Globe-Horn Book Award for Fiction and Poetry	Honor	
2021	Walter Dean Myers Award	Winner	
2021	YALSA's Best Fiction for Young Adults	Selection	
2021	YALSA's Quick Picks for Reluctant Young Adult Readers	Top 10	
2021	New Atlantic Independent Booksellers Association Book Award for Children's Literature	Winner	
