= Nimali =

Nimali is a given name. Notable people with the name include:

- Nimali Liyanarachchi (born 1989), Sri Lankan runner
- Nimali Perera (born 1990), Sri Lankan cricket umpire
