= Ask the Passengers =

2012 young adult novel by A. S. King

- Author: A. S. King
- Language: English
- Published: October 23, 2012
- Publisher: Little, Brown Books for Young Readers
- Publication place: United States
- Pages: 336
- ISBN: 9780316194679

Ask the Passengers is a young adult novel by A. S. King, published October 23, 2012 by Little, Brown Books for Young Readers. In 2012, the book won the Los Angeles Times Book Prize for Young Adult Literature.

== Reception ==
Ask the Passengers was generally well-received, including starred reviews from Booklist, The Horn Book, Kirkus Reviews, Publishers Weekly, and Shelf Awareness.

Kirkus Reviews called Ask the Passengers "[q]uite possibly the best teen novel featuring a girl questioning her sexuality written in years." Publishers Weekly said the book was "[f]unny, provocative, and intelligent," noting that it "celebrates love in all of its messy, modern complexity."

On behalf of The Bulletin of the Center for Children's Books, Deborah Stevenson wrote, "For kids struggling with their own truths, it can be hard to believe how much light there is once you come out of the cave. This is a book that knows and understands that, and it's one that readers will believe."

The book was removed from public school libraries in Martin County, Florida.

Awards and honors for Ask the Passengers
Year	Award/Honor	Result	Ref.
2012	Los Angeles Times Book Prize for Young Adult Literature	Winner	
2013	Amelia Elizabeth Walden Award	Finalist	
2013	James Cook Book Award	Winner	
2013	YALSA Best Fiction for Young Adults	Selection	
2014	Milwaukee County Teen Book Award	Nominee	
2014	Rhode Island Teen Book Award	Nominee	
2015	Lincoln Award	Nominee	
