= Trung Le Nguyen =

Vietnamese-American cartoonist (born 1990)

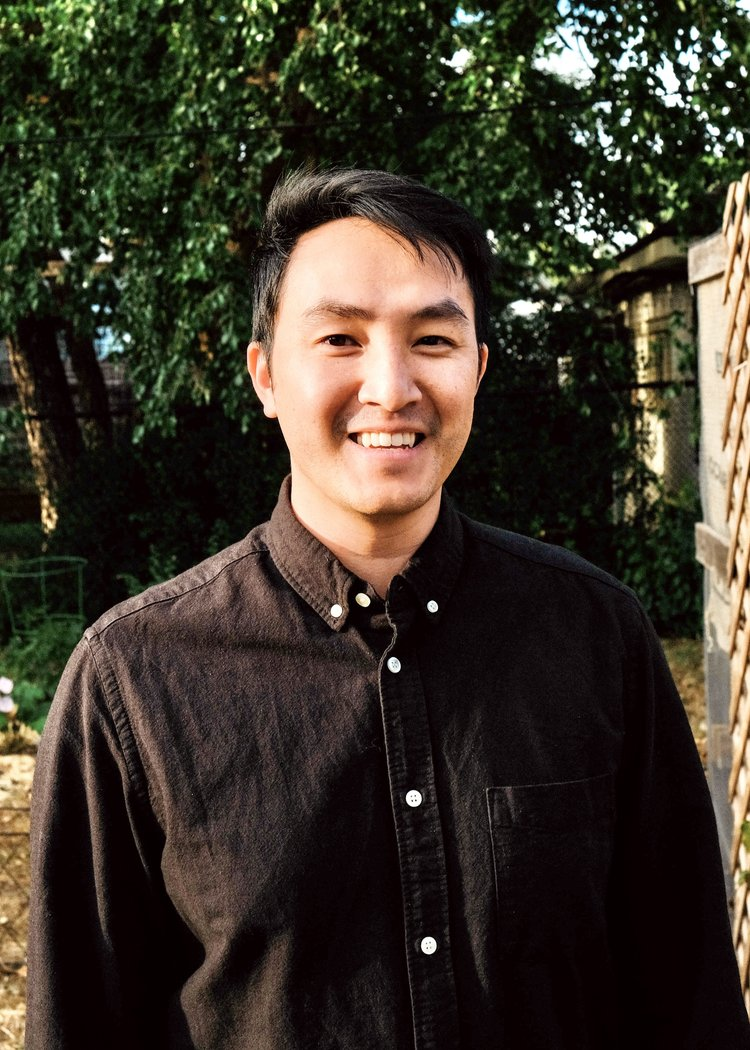
- Trung in 2022
- Born: Nguyễn Lê Trung; June 2, 1990 (age 36); Palawan, Philippines
- Other name: Trungles
- Education: Hamline University
- Occupation: Cartoonist
- Notable work: The Magic Fish
- Website: trungles.com

Trung Le Nguyen (Vietnamese: Nguyễn Lê Trung, born June 2, 1990), also known as Trungles, is a Vietnamese-American cartoonist. He is best known as the author of the graphic novel The Magic Fish, published by Random House Graphic in 2020. Another graphic novel, Angelica and the Bear Prince, was published in 2025.

== Biography ==
=== Early life and career ===
Trung Le Nguyen was born in a Vietnamese refugee camp somewhere in the Philippines Province of Palawan and moved to the United States as a child in 1992. His parents were Vietnamese boat people. Trung began drawing comics in middle school but gave up the pastime in college, stating, "I never really thought to make it a career. It always seemed like this fluffy way for me to pass the time". He graduated from Hamline University with a bachelor's degree in studio art with a minor in art history in 2012. Originally planning to pursue a career in arts administration, he instead chose to pursue a career in comics. Trung's art is noted for its use of traditional inking and penciling and references to Vietnamese imagery, shōjo manga, and classic children's literature. He cites Rose O'Neill, Heinrich Lefler, and Harry Clarke among his influences.

In 2017, Trung was a jurist for the Ignatz Awards. Also in 2017 his coloring book Fauns & Fairies was published by Oni Press under their erotic comics imprint Limerence Press. In 2018, he was an artist on the Image Comics romance comics anthology Twisted Romance, written by Alex de Campi. In 2020, Random House Graphic published Trung's debut graphic novel The Magic Fish. The book, which follows a young Vietnamese gay immigrant and his parents who bond and learn English through fairy tale books, was inspired by Trung's upbringing.

Trung's second graphic novel titled Angelica And The Bear Prince was published by Random House Graphic in 2025.

=== Personal life ===
Trung is gay, non-binary, and uses pronouns he/they. He resides in Minneapolis, Minnesota.

== Bibliography ==
Title	Year	Publisher	Identifier	Ref.
Fauns & Fairies: The Adult Fantasy Coloring Book	2017	Limerence Press	ISBN 978-1-62010-403-3	
Twisted Romance #4	2018	Image Comics	ASIN B077XKXFGY	
Adventure Time Marshall Lee Spectacular	2018	Boom! Studios	ASIN B01M07CJBI	
Star Spinner Tarot	2020	Chronicle Books	ISBN 978-1-4521-8006-9	
The Magic Fish	2020	Random House Graphic	ISBN 978-0-593-12529-8	
Aquaman: 80th Anniversary 100-Page Super Spectacular #1	2021	DC Comics	ASIN B09DGR27M3	
Angelica And The Bear Prince	2025	Random House Graphic	ISBN 978-0-593-12547-2	

== Accolades ==
Trung was nominated for a 2021 Eisner Award for Best Writer/Artist. The Magic Fish won two 2021 Harvey Awards for Book of the Year and Best Children or Young Adult Book. It was also named a top book on the American Library Association's Rainbow List in 2021, and was selected as one of the best books of 2020 by The Globe and Mail, the New York Public Library, and Nerdist.

Organizations (Note: Awards, festivals, honors and other miscellaneous organizations are listed in alphabetical order.)	Year (Note: Indicates the year of ceremony.)	Category	Work	Result	Ref.
British Fantasy Award	2021	Best Comic/Graphic Novel	The Magic Fish	Finalist	
Delaware Library Association	2023	Blue Hen Book Award for Graphic Novels for Teen Readers	The Magic Fish	Nominated	
Dragon Con	2021	Dragon Awards for Best Graphic Novel	The Magic Fish	Finalist	
Eisner Awards	2021	Best Writer/Artist	The Magic Fish	Nominated	
GLAAD Media Award	2021	Outstanding Comic Book	The Magic Fish	Nominated	
Harvey Awards	2021	Book of the Year	The Magic Fish	Won	
Harvey Awards	2021	Best Children or Young Adult Book	The Magic Fish	Won	
International Literacy Association	2021	Young Adult Fiction	The Magic Fish	Won	
Lambda Literary Awards	2021	LGBTQ Young Adult	The Magic Fish	Finalist	
Mare di Libri Book Prize	2023	Best Graphic Novel	The Magic Fish	Won (Note: The prize was awarded to the Italian version of the book titled Magic fish. Le storie del pesce magico.)	
Romics del Fumetto Award	2023	Best Children's Book	The Magic Fish	Won	
South Dakota Library Association	2023	Teen Choice Book Awards for Middle School	The Magic Fish	Honored	
The Assembly on Literature for Adolescents	2022	Amelia Elizabeth Walden Award	The Magic Fish	Finalist	
Virginia Library Association	2021	VLA Graphic Novel Diversity Awards for Youth	The Magic Fish	Won	
