= Dig (novel) =

2019 novel by A. S. King

- Author: A. S. King
- Language: English
- Genre: Young adult fiction
- Publisher: Dutton Press
- Publication date: 2019
- Publication place: United States
- Media type: Print Hardcover
- ISBN: 9781101994917
- OCLC: 1037883891

Dig is a young adult novel by A. S. King, published by Dutton Press in 2019.

The book was awarded the Michael L. Printz Award in 2020.
