= Piecing Me Together =

2017 children's book by Renee Watson

- First edition
- Author: Renée Watson
- Publisher: Bloomsbury USA
- Publication date: February 14, 2017
- Pages: 264
- Awards: Coretta Scott King Award; Newbery Medal; Josette Frank Award
- ISBN: 978-1-68119-105-8
- OCLC: 948336456

Piecing Me Together is a 2017 young adult novel written by Renée Watson. The first person novel tells the story of Jade, an ambitious African American high school student. The book, a New York Times best seller, was well reviewed and won several awards.

== Plot ==
Jade, who is also the book's narrator, is a sixteen-year-old African American student attending a mostly white private school in Portland, Oregon on a scholarship. Jade is from a poor neighborhood and is different from the rest of her school. Heeding her mother's advice, Jade works to take advantage of every opportunity presented to her. Hoping to be afforded the opportunity to study abroad so she can utilize her fluent Spanish Skills, Jade is instead offered the chance to be paired with a mentor in the Women to Women program by her school's guidance counselor. Paired with Maxine, Jade initially has high hopes for this mentor-ship, hopes which are dashed when Maxine proves unreliable and Jade begins to wonder if it is she or Maxine who is getting more out of the program. Through her art, Jade begins to act on the realization that she needs to make her own opportunities.

== Reception and awards ==
Piecing Me Together received starred reviews from The Bulletin of the Center for Children's Books, Kirkus Reviews, Publishers Weekly, and School Library Journal, as well as positive reviews from Booklist.

Kirkus, School Library Journal, NPR, the New York Public Library, and Chicago Public Library named it one of the best books of 2017.

It was named to the Bank Street Children's Book Committee's 2018 Best Books of the Year List with an "Outstanding Merit" distinction and won the committee's Josette Frank Award for fiction.

Awards
Year	Award	Result
2018	Amelia Bloomer List	Top Ten
2018	Coretta Scott King Author Award	Winner
2018	Josette Frank Award	Winner
2018	Newbery Medal	Honor
2018	YALSA's Best Fiction for Young Adults	Top Ten
2019	Outstanding Books for the College Bound: Literature and Language Arts	Selection
