= Olivia A. Cole =

American writer

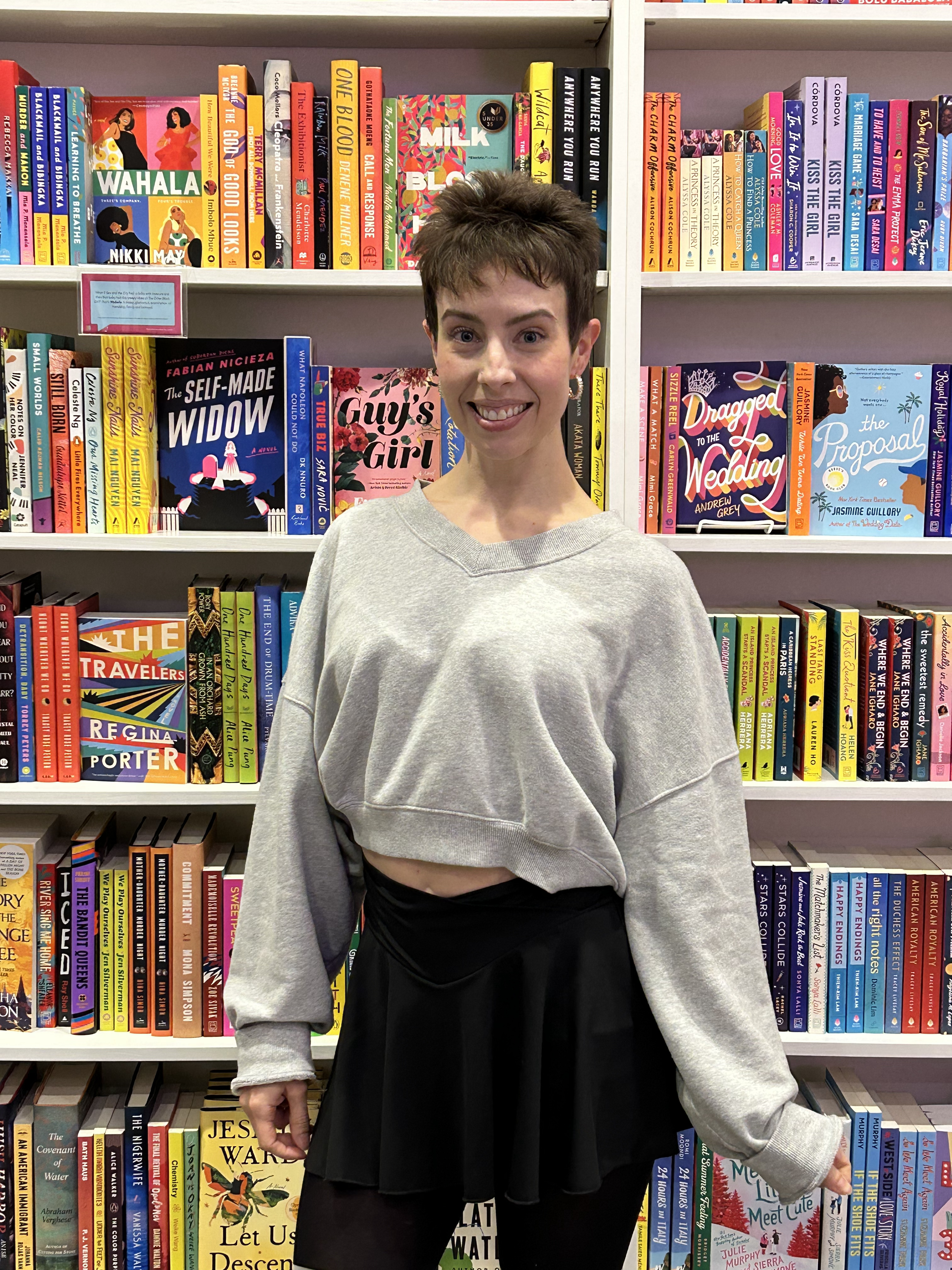
- Olivia A. Cole, 2023
- Education: Columbia College Chicago (B.A)
- Occupation: Author
- Writing career
- Years active: 2014–present
- Genre: Young adult literature
- Notable work: Ariel Crashes a Train (2024)
- Website: oliviaacole.com

Olivia A. Cole is an American writer from Louisville, Kentucky. Cole is primarily an author of young adult literature, and has also written essays on the topics of womanhood and race.

== Early life and education ==
Olivia A. Cole was raised in Louisville, Kentucky. She wrote her first book when she was eight. In high school, she was selected to attend the Kentucky Governor's School for the Arts' three-week creative writing summer program.

Cole was an undergraduate student at Columbia College Chicago, where she earned a B.A. in cultural studies with a minor in poetry in 2011.

== Career ==
Cole's debut novel, Panther in the Hive, was published in March 2014. She has since released several more books, including The Truth About White Lies (2022) and Ariel Crashes a Train (2024).

Ariel Crashes a Train was longlisted for the 2024 National Book Award for Young People's Literature.

As an essayist, Cole's works have been published in The Oregon Literary Review, The Comstock Review, The Huffington Post, The Daily Dot, and xoJane.

== Personal life ==
Cole and her husband share a daughter. Cole resides with her family in Louisville.

She became aware of her queer identity at age 13. In 2015, she published an essay about trauma stemming from abuse she had experienced in sixth grade.

In 2016, she had a viral tweet about clam chowder during the lead-up to Hurricane Mathew. In 2017, she had a viral moment on Twitter and Reddit about her haunted experience with her husband while house-hunting, with similarities to the plot of the film Get Out.

== Selected works ==
- Panther in the Hive (2014), ISBN 978-0-99161-553-7
- The Rooster's Garden (2016), ISBN 978-0-99161-554-4
- A Conspiracy of Stars (2018), ISBN 978-0-06264-423-7
- An Anatomy of Beasts (2019), ISBN 978-0-06264-426-8
- Cloud Parliament (2020), ISBN 978-0-99161-556-8
- Time to Roar (2020), ISBN 978-1-54760-371-8
- The Truth about White Lies (2022), ISBN 978-0-75955-411-5
- Dear Medusa (2023), ISBN 978-0-59348-574-3
- Where the Lockwood Grows (2023), ISBN 978-0-31644-932-8
- Ariel Crashes a Train (2024), ISBN 978-0-59364-468-3
- The Empty Place (2024), ISBN 978-0-31644-953-3
