= Joan Abelove =

American writer of young adult novels

- Born: 1945 (age 80–81); New York, United States
- Education: Barnard College, City University of New York (PhD)
- Occupation: Author
- Children: 1
- Writing career
- Language: German
- Genre: Young adult fiction
- Notable work: Go and Come Back; Saying It Out Loud
- Notable awards: American Library Association; 2000 Best Books for Young Adult

Joan Abelove (born 1945) is an American writer of young adult novels. She attended Barnard College and has a PhD in cultural anthropology from the City University of New York. She spent two years in the jungles of Peru as part of her doctoral research and used the experience as background for her first novel, Go and Come Back (1998). Go and Come Back, about a young Peruvian girl's encounter with anthropologists, earned numerous awards and citations, including a "Best Books for Young Adults" selection of the American Library Association and "Book Prize Finalist" selection of the Los Angeles Times. Her second book, Saying It Out Loud, is about a Jewish girl coming to terms with her mother's death from brain cancer.

Joan Abelove participates in a critique group with Gail Carson Levine, writer of Ella Enchanted and Writing Magic, a guide for child authors who wish to make their stories better.

She now lives in New York City with her husband and son.

== Bibliography ==
- Go and Come Back (1998), ISBN 9780789424761
- Saying It Out Loud (1999), ISBN 9780789426093
- Lost & Found: Award-Winning Authors Share Real-Life Experiences Through Fiction (contributor) (2000)
