= A. M. Jenkins =

American writer of young adult fiction (born 1961)

Amanda McRaney Jenkins
- Born: 1961 (age 64–65)
- Occupation: Author
- Writing career
- Genre: Young adult fiction

Amanda McRaney Jenkins (born 1961) is an American writer of young adult fiction. Her novels have received considerable recognition, including the Delacorte Prize for Breaking Boxes, and a Printz Honor for Repossessed.

Jenkins was born in 1961 and has lived all her life in Texas. She now lives in Benbrook with two of her three sons and assorted pets. Before writing full-time, she was a high school math teacher.

== Awards and honors ==
In 2005, Jenkins received the PEN/Phyllis Naylor Working Writer Fellowship, a stipend intended to grant a measure of financial freedom to a writer of children's or YA literature.

Awards for Jenkins's writing
Year	Title	Award	Result	Ref.
1997	Breaking Boxes	Delacorte Press Prize for a First YA Novel	Winner	
2002	Damage	ALA Best Fiction for Young Adults	Top 10	
2007	Repossessed	Cybils Award for Young Adult Speculative Fiction	Finalist	
2008	Repossessed	Michael L. Printz Award	Honor	

== Publications ==
Title	Released	Additional formats	Description
Breaking Boxes	10/1/1997	Hardcover, Paperback	The story of a 16-year-old loner named Charlie Calmont, his older brother Trent, and how they get by after both of their parents are gone. It is also the story of Charlie's first real, heart-breaking friendship.
Damage	1/1/2001	Hardcover, E-Book, Paperback	What you really want to do is give up trying. Lay your head down on the steering wheel and quit sneezing, quit breathing, quit trying.The problem is, you can't. Just quit, that is. When people want to quit, they have to choose. Make a decision. Take action.
Out of Order	9/1/2003	Hardcover, E-Book, Paperback	Colt's perfect life crumbles when his girlfriend breaks up with him and looming academic ineligibility threatens his baseball career. For a guy who gets by on his good looks and talent with a bat, Colt knows that he could be facing his toughest challenge ever.
Beating Heart	1/1/2006	Hardcover, E-Book, Paperback	She haunts his dreams. She is a momentary chill in warm sunlight, a shadow, and a memory of secret kisses and hidden passion. He is seventeen, and ever since he moved into this house he has dreamt of her... hot, wordless dreams that turn darker and more intense every night. Ghost and boy fascinate each other—until her memories and his desire collide in a moment that changes them both forever.
Repossessed	6/1/2007	Hardcover, E-Book, Paperback	Don't call me a demon. I prefer the term Fallen Angel. Everybody deserves a vacation, right? Especially if you have a pointless job like tormenting the damned. So who could blame me for blowing off my duties and taking a small, unauthorized break? Besides, I've always wanted to see what physical existence is like. That's why I "borrowed" the slightly used body of a slacker teen. Believe me, he wasn't going to be using it anymore anyway. I have never understood why humans do the things they do. Like sin—if it's so terrible, why do they keep doing it? I'm going to have a lot of fun finding out!
Night Road	6/1/2008	Hardcover, E-Book, Paperback	Accidents happen. Someone had lost control and killed without meaning to. Cole may look like an average teen, but a century of nourishing himself on blood has taught him an extraordinary level of caution and control. He's a master of life on the road and he thinks he's prepared for anything. But not everyone is as careful as he is, and Cole is about to learn that even the best of plans can go wrong.
Queen of the Masquerade; Hallowmere Book 5 Cowritten with Tiffany Trent	8/12/2008	Paperback	Christina wakes in a new world with no memory of who she is or where she came from. Tasked with solving a riddle that will save the duke and duchess who rescue her and take her in as a changeling, Christina seeks to puzzle out just what she's doing here and why her memory has fled. But the riddle isn't just a key to saving the duke and duchess—it's Christina's key to something far more dire, a mission she knows she must remember, one that involves the strange young man who keeps appearing in odd places. Is the riddle a prophecy or a warning?
