= Ibi Zoboi =

Haitian-American author of young adult fiction

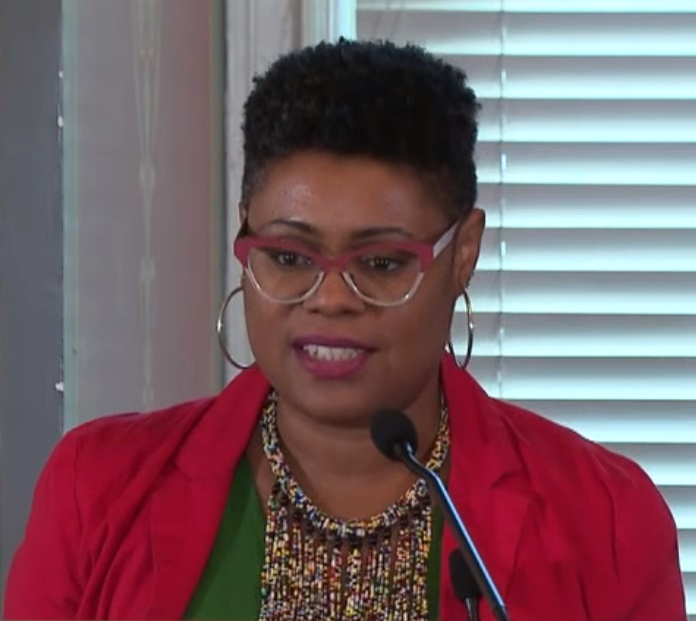
- Ibi Zoboi receives a 2018 Americas Award from the Library of Congress
- Born: Port-au-Prince, Haiti
- Education: Vermont College of Fine Arts (MFA)
- Spouse: Joseph Zoboi
- Children: 3
- Writing career
- Years active: 2005-now
- Genre: Young Adult fiction
- Notable work: American Street
- Website: ibizoboi.net

Ibi Aanu Zoboi is a Haitian-American author of young adult fiction. She is best known for her young adult novel American Street, which was a finalist for the National Book Award for Young Adults' Literature in 2017.

== Early life ==
Born in Haiti as Pascale Philantrope, Zoboi immigrated from Port-au-Prince with her mother at age four and grew up in Bushwick, Brooklyn, in the 1980s. The move was hard on Zoboi, who found Brooklyn to be lonely, as her family was in Haiti and her mother worked. She cites the move from Haiti to New York as one that defined her. Four years later, Zoboi returned to Haiti for a visit with her mother. When they tried to return to the United States, Zoboi was not allowed to return. Zoboi stayed in Haiti with relatives for three months while her mother worked to get her back. After her return, her teachers placed her in an English as a Second Language course when she was in the fifth grade, wrongly assuming that Zoboi couldn't speak English. This caused her to feel "invisible". She turned to poetry and writing as a way for her to be seen.

Before becoming an author, Zoboi worked at a newspaper and in a bookstore. Interested in writing, she took classes in creative writing at the Vermont College of Fine Arts and graduated with her MFA in Writing for Children and Young Adults.

Zoboi took her husband's surname at marriage and changed her first name to Ibi, a Yoruba word for "rebirth", reflecting her birth name, Pascale, which is related to Easter.

== Career ==
Zoboi began her writing career as an investigative reporter and worked among others with Octavia Butler. Zoboi is a graduate of the Clarion West Writers Workshop as well as a winner of the 2011 Gulliver Travel Grant. In 2018, Zoboi received the Americas Award for Children's and Young Adult Literature from the Library of Congress. While working on her MFA in Writing for Children and Young Adults, she was chosen as a finalist for the New Visions Award before publishing her debut novel. Through Kickstarter, Zoboi was able to fund the Daughters of Anacaona Writing Project, a creative writing workshop in Port-au-Prince. According to Zoboi, one of the reasons she started this workshop was to give Haitian girls a voice and ways to see themselves in literature. Named for the Taino queen Anacaona, the project helped Haitian and Caribbean girls from 2009 to 2014.

== Selected works ==
Prior to publishing her first novel, Zoboi wrote short stories including one story titled "The Farming of Gods" which was published in 2012 and features a setting of a post apocalyptic Haiti following the 2010 Haiti Earthquake. "The Farming of Gods" is an example of Afrofuturism and combines aspects of traditional Haitian belief systems with futuristic and dystopian concepts.

Her debut novel American Street, about a Haitian teen whose mother gets detained when they first immigrate to America, explores magical realism, immigration, and Vodou culture, all based on the author's on experiences as a Haitian-American immigrant. It was published by Balzer + Bray in 2017. American Street was chosen as a finalist for the National Book Award for Young People's Literature in 2017 and it was named as a 2018 Bank Street Children's Book Committee's Best Books of the Year with an "Outstanding Merit" distinction. The novel is set in Detroit, Michigan because she wanted the story to be told according to her experiences in Bushwick in the 1980s, a neighborhood changed since her childhood.

Zoboi edited the young adult anthology Black Enough: Stories of Being Young & Black in America, published in 2019 by Balzer + Bray. Black Enough received starred reviews from Publishers Weekly, Kirkus Reviews, and Booklist. It appeared on the 2020 Bank Street Children's Book Committee's Best Books of the Year List with an "Outstanding Merit" distinction.

Zoboi's 2018 novel Pride is a re-telling of Jane Austen's 1813 novel Pride and Prejudice, set in the Bushwick neighborhood of Brooklyn, New York.

My Life as an Ice Cream Sandwich, Zoboi's 2019 middle-grade novel, is about Ebony-Grace, a girl who is sent from Alabama to help her grandfather in Harlem in the 1980s and is her first middle grade book. As a young Black girl who enjoys the science-fiction worlds of Star Wars and Star Trek, Ebony-Grace is seen as an "ice cream sandwich" by her peers; brown on the outside, but white on the inside.

Her 2021 picture book, The People Remember, published by Balzer + Bray and illustrated by Loveis Wise, appeared on the 2022 Bank Street Children's Book Committee's Best Book of the Year List with an "Outstanding Merit" distinction.

Her 2023 young adult novel, Nigeria Jones, published by Balzer + Bray, won the 2024 Coretta Scott King Author Award.

Her young adult novel (S)Kin was a finalist for the 2026 Ignyte Award for Outstanding Novel – Young Adult and a finalist/honorable mention for the 2026 Crawford Award.

== Bibliography ==
Young adult

- American Street (Balzer + Bray, 2017)
- Pride (Balzer + Bray, 2018)
- Punching the Air (Balzer + Bray, 2020)
- Nigeria Jones, (Balzer + Bray, New York, 2023) ISBN 9780062888846
- (S)Kin (Versify, 2025)

Middle grade

- My Life as an Ice-Cream Sandwich (Penguin, 2019)
- Star Child: A Biographical Constellation of Octavia Estelle Butler (Dutton Books, Penguin), 2022)

Picture books

- The People Remember illustrated by Loveis Wise (Balzer + Bray, 2021)

Short stories and essays

- "Old Flesh Song" in Dark Matter: Reading the Bones, edited by Sheree Thomas (Aspect, 2005)
- "The Harem" in Haiti Noir, edited by Edwige Danticat (Akashic Books, 2010)
- "The Fire in Your Sky" in Crossed Genres Issue 33: Villains, edited by Bart R. Leib and Kay T. Holt (Crossed Genres Publications, 2011)
- "The Fire in Your Sky" in Under the Needle's Eye (Smashwords, 2012) (with stories by Susan Ee, Emily Mah, Kini Ibura Salaam)
- "The Farming of Gods" (Konbit, 2012)
- "A is for Ayiti" (One Moore Book, 2012)
- "The Farming of Gods" in Mothership: Tales from Afrofuturism and Beyond, edited by Bill Campbell and Edward Austin Hall (Rosarium Publishing, 2013)
- "Forgiving My Father, The Serial Rapist" (The Rumpus, 2015)
- "Hourglass" in Meet Cute: Some People Are Destined to Meet (HMH, 2018)
- Title TBA in Dear Heartbreak: YA Authors and Teens on the Dark Side of Love, edited by Heather Demetrios (Henry Holt, 2018)
- "The (R)Evolution of Nigeria Jones" in Black Enough: Stories of Being Young & Black in America (also editor) (Balzer + Bray, 2019)
- “Haitian Sensation” in Wild Tongues Can’t Be Tamed: 15 Voices from the Latinx Diaspora (Flatiron Books, 2021)
- "Earth is Ghetto" in Cool. Awkward. Black., edited by Karen Strong (Viking, 2023)
