= Amelia Elizabeth Walden Award =

Annual literary award

- Awarded for: "literary excellence, widespread appeal, and positive approach to life in young-adult literature"
- Country: United States
- Presented by: The Assembly on Literature for Adolescents (ALAN)
- First award: 2009
- Website: https://www.alan-ya.org/awards/walden-award/

The Amelia Elizabeth Walden Award, presented by The Assembly on Literature for Adolescents of the National Council of Teachers of English (ALAN), is an annual award in the United States for a book that exemplifies literary excellence, widespread appeal, and a positive approach to life in young adult literature. It is named after Amelia Elizabeth Walden who died in Westport, Connecticut in 2002 and was a pioneer in the field of Young Adult Literature. The national award is presented annually to the author of a title selected by ALAN's Amelia Elizabeth Walden Award Committee.

== History ==
The Amelia Elizabeth Walden Award was established in 2008 to honor the wishes of Amelia Elizabeth Walden. It allows for the sum of $5,000 to be awarded annually to the winning title, and was first awarded on Monday, November 23, 2009. The award highlights works written for a young adult audience that demonstrate a positive approach to life, widespread teen appeal, and literary merit.

Amelia Elizabeth Walden was born in New York City on January 15, 1909. She graduated from Columbia University in 1934 and attended the American Academy of Dramatic Arts. From 1935 to 1945, she taught English and Dramatics at Norwalk High School (Connecticut). She married John William Harmon in 1946. Her first novel, Gateway, was published in 1946. Walden told her editor that she intended the novel for young people who lived at "the gateway", on that middle ground between adolescence and adulthood. Walden claimed, “I respond to young people because I remember my own adolescence so vividly – and fondly. It was a period of total involvement, of enjoying life to the hilt.” Walden wrote over 40 young adult novels. She died in 2002 in Westport, Connecticut. A collection of some of her literary manuscripts and correspondence with McGraw-Hill between 1954 and 1977 relating to book production is available for review in the Special Collections and University Archives of the University of Oregon Libraries.

== Criteria ==
The selection committee composed of ten The Assembly on Literature for Adolescents (ALAN) members (3 teachers, 3 university professors, 3 librarians, and 1 chair) appointed by the previous year's chair and current ALAN President for a one-year term with the possibility of re-election for a second term. They award one winning title and honor up to four additional titles on their shortlist.

- Per Walden’s request

The selected title 'MUST:

1. be a work of fiction, ideally a novel (stand-alone or part of a series);
2. be published within one year prior to the call for titles;
3. be published in the United States but may have been published elsewhere prior; and
4. possess a positive approach to life, widespread teen appeal, and literary merit (please see below for additional guidance).
- A Positive Approach to Life

Submitted titles should:

  - treat teen readers as capable and thoughtful young people
  - offer hope and optimism, even when describing difficult circumstances
  - have a credible and appropriate resolution
  - portray characters involved in shaping their lives in a positive way, even as they struggle with the harsh realities of life
- Widespread Teen Appeal

Submitted titles should:

  - be intended expressly for readers aged 12–18
  - have universal themes that transcend time and place
  - have themes that resonate with a wide variety of readers, regardless of race, class, gender, and sexual orientation
  - provide readers with a window to the world and/or reflect their own experiences
- Literary Merit

Submitted titles should:

  - contain well-developed characters
  - employ well-constructed forms suitable to function
  - include language and literary devices that enhance the narrative
  - suggest cogent and richly-realized themes
  - present an authentic voice

== Recipients ==
Walden Award Winner and Finalists
| Year | Author | Book | Result | Ref. |
|---|---|---|---|---|
| 2009 | Steve Kluger | My Most Excellent Year: A Novel of Love, Mary Poppins & Fenway Park | Winner | |
| 2009 | Jacqueline Woodson | After Tupac and D Foster | Finalist | |
| 2009 | Kristin Cashore | Graceling | Finalist | |
| 2009 | Neil Gaiman | The Graveyard Book | Finalist | |
| 2009 | Jenny Valentine | Me, the Missing, and the Dead (originally Finding Violet Park, UK, 2007) | Finalist | |
| 2010 | Kristin Cashore | Fire | Winner | |
| 2010 | Francisco X. Stork | Marcelo in the Real World | Finalist | |
| 2010 | Rick Yancey | The Monstrumologist | Finalist | |
| 2010 | Justina Chen Headley | North of Beautiful | Finalist | |
| 2010 | Jill S. Alexander | The Sweetheart of Prosper County | Finalist | |
| 2011 | Francisco X. Stork | The Last Summer of the Death Warriors | Winner | |
| 2011 | Jordan Sonnenblick | After Ever After | Finalist | |
| 2011 | Matt de la Peña | I Will Save You | Finalist | |
| 2011 | Matthew Quick | Sorta Like a Rockstar | Finalist | |
| 2011 | Kristen Chandler | Wolves, Boys, & Other Things That Might Kill Me | Finalist | |
| 2012 | Lauren Myracle | Shine | Winner | |
| 2012 | Robert Sharenow | Berlin Boxing Club | Finalist | |
| 2012 | Moira Young | Blood Red Road | Finalist | |
| 2012 | Ruta Sepetys | Between Shades of Gray | Finalist | |
| 2012 | Guadalupe Garcia McCall | Under the Mesquite | Finalist | |
| 2013 | John Green | The Fault in Our Stars | Winner | |
| 2013 | Benjamin Alire Sáenz | Aristotle and Dante Discover the Secrets of the Universe | Finalist | |
| 2013 | A. S. King | Ask the Passengers | Finalist | |
| 2013 | Eliot Schrefer | Endangered | Finalist | |
| 2014 | Rainbow Rowell | Eleanor & Park | Winner | |
| 2014 | Patrick Flores-Scott | Jumped In | Finalist | |
| 2014 | Sylvia Whitman | The Milk of Birds | Finalist | |
| 2014 | Bill Konigsberg | Openly Straight | Finalist | |
| 2014 | Andrew Smith | Winger | Finalist | |
| 2015 | A.S. King | Glory O'Brien's History of the Future | Winner | |
| 2015 | Michael Williams | Diamond Boy | Finalist | |
| 2015 | Isabel Quintero | Gabi, A Girl in Pieces | Finalist | |
| 2015 | Laurie Halse Anderson | The Impossible Knife of Memory | Finalist | |
| 2015 | Deborah Wiles | Revolution (The Sixties Trilogy) | Finalist | |
| 2016 | Jason Reynolds and Brendan Kiely | All American Boys | Winner | |
| 2016 | Jennifer Niven | All the Bright Places | Finalist | |
| 2016 | Neal Shusterman | Challenger Deep | Finalist | |
| 2016 | Ashley Hope Pérez | Out of Darkness | Finalist | |
| 2016 | Ryan Graudin | Wolf by Wolf | Finalist | |
| 2017 | Jeff Zentner | The Serpent King | Winner | |
| 2017 | Kathleen Glasgow | Girl in Pieces | Finalist | |
| 2017 | Bonnie-Sue Hitchcock | The Smell of Other People's Houses | Finalist | |
| 2017 | Ruta Sepetys | Salt to the Sea | Finalist | |
| 2017 | Nicola Yoon | The Sun Is Also a Star | Finalist | |
| 2018 | Angie Thomas | The Hate U Give | Winner | |
| 2018 | Nic Stone | Dear Martin | Finalist | |
| 2018 | Jason Reynolds | Long Way Down | Finalist | |
| 2018 | Amy Reed | The Nowhere Girls | Finalist | |
| 2018 | Melanie Crowder | An Uninterrupted View of the Sky | Finalist | |
| 2019 | Elizabeth Acevedo | The Poet X | Winner | |
| 2019 | Shaun David Hutchinson | The Apocalypse of Elena Mendoza | Finalist | |
| 2019 | Adib Khorram | Darius the Great Is Not Okay | Finalist | |
| 2019 | Joy McCullough | Blood, Water, Paint | Finalist | |
| 2019 | Emily X.R. Pan | The Astonishing Color of After | Finalist | |
| 2020 | Julie Berry | Lovely War | Winner | |
| 2020 | Elizabeth Acevedo | With the Fire on High | Finalist | |
| 2020 | Abdi Nazemian | Like a Love Story | Finalist | |
| 2020 | Randy Ribay | Patron Saints of Nothing | Finalist | |
| 2020 | Kip Wilson | White Rose | Finalist | |
| 2021 | Elizabeth Acevedo | Clap When You Land | Winner | |
| 2021 | Brittney Morris | Slay | Finalist | |
| 2021 | Christina Hammonds Reed | The Black Kids | Finalist | |
| 2021 | Deborah Wiles | Kent State | Finalist | |
| 2022 | Jeff Zentner | In the Wild Light | Winner | |
| 2022 | Yamile Saied Méndez | Furia | Finalist | |
| 2022 | Raquel Vásquez Gilliland | How Moon Fuentez Fell in Love with the Universe | Finalist | |
| 2022 | Trung Le Nguyen | The Magic Fish | Finalist | |
| 2022 | Traci Chee | We Are Not Free | Finalist | |
| 2023 | Sabaa Tahir | All My Rage | Winner | |
| 2023 | Maya MacGregor | The Many Half-Lived Lives of Sam Sylvester | Finalist | |
| 2023 | Jessie Burton | Medusa | Finalist | |
| 2023 | Kyrie McCauley | We Can Be Heroes | Finalist | |
| 2024 | Ari Tison | Saints of the Household | Winner | |
| 2024 | Kim Johnson | Invisible Son | Finalist | |
| 2024 | Laekan Zea Kemp | An Appetite for Miracles | Finalist | |
| 2024 | Maria Ingrande Mora | The Immeasurable Depth of You | Finalist | |
| 2024 | Ream Shukairy | The Next New Syrian Girl | Finalist | |
| 2025 | Josh Galarza | The Great Cool Ranch Dorito In The Sky | Winner | |
| 2025 | Byron Graves | Rez Ball | Finalist | |
| 2025 | Jennifer Yu | Grief in the Fourth Dimension | Finalist | |
| 2025 | Seema Yasmin | Unbecoming | Finalist | |
| 2025 | Bessie Flores Zaldivar | Libertad | Finalist | |
| 2026 | DeAndra Davis | All The Noise at Once | Winner | |
| 2026 | Joanna Yi | All the Tomorrow's After | Finalist | |
| 2026 | Maria Van Lieshout | Song of a Blackbird | Finalist | |
| 2026 | Charlene Thomas | It's You Every Time | Finalist | |

== See also ==
- Printz Award – American Library Association medal recognizing the year's best book for teens
- Newbery Medal – American literature for children (children or young adults prior to 2000)
- Carnegie Medal – British literature for children or young adults
- Guardian Prize – fiction for children or young adults by British and Commonwealth writers
