= Katharine Lee McEwan =

English actress, screenwriter, and film producer

Katharine Lee McEwan is an English actress, screenwriter, and film producer. She gained recognition in 2015 with the award-winning independent feature film Solitary, which she wrote and produced in addition to playing the lead role.

== Early life ==
McEwan was born in Redcar, England where she spent her formative years being homeschooled and acting in local productions. Traditional education left her uninspired, so at the age of 18 she decided to forgo university and travel around the world instead. She visited a variety of countries including Australia before finally settling in Los Angeles where she now resides.

== Career ==
McEwan returned to her love of acting in her 20s. She completed a summer program at the American Academy of Dramatic Arts before continuing her studies at the Lee Strasberg Theatre and Film Institute. This is where she met Sasha Krane, the nephew of famous acting teacher Lee Strasberg and the Creative Director of Film and Theatre Production at The Lee Strasberg Theatre and Film Institute. They became longtime collaborators and married soon after.

McEwan is an accomplished stage actress. She originated the role of Breda in Bernard Farell's 2007 production of Verdi Girls at the Laguna Playhouse in Laguna Beach, California. She also played the role of Amanda Pryne in Noël Coward's Private Lives at the Long Beach Playhouse in Long Beach, California. After moving into independent film, McEwan decided "to create [her] own role" and began writing the screenplay for Solitary, a feature-length drama set in Portsmouth, England. The story follows Nora, a troubled woman struggling to confront her past and reconnect with her estranged family. McEwan wanted to "explore family dynamics and what happens when the truth is sacrificed for an illusion of functionality [and] show how damaging this culture of open secrets can be – not just for the individual victims, but for society as a whole."

Solitary was directed by McEwan's husband Sasha Krane and executive produced by Roger Taylor of the British rock band Queen. Taylor also composed an original musical score for the film. In addition to playing the lead role of Nora, McEwan produced the film along with her lifelong friend Sarina Taylor, who also starred in the film as Nora's sister Shannon. During its year long festival run in 2015, the film received seventeen awards and thirteen nominations and was the opening night film of the 2015 London Independent Film Festival where it won Best UK Feature. When asked about doing a movie about such a tough topic, McEwan stated that everyone "...told us how hard it would be to make this movie, but luckily neither Sarina or I have ever been much for rules."

In 2017 Katharine produced and acted in the short film Swim written and directed by Mari Walker. Described as a "lissome and poignant LGBT film" Mari Walker’s trans coming-of-age story Swim won the Audience Awards for Fiction Feature Film and Short Film, respectively at the 2017 Los Angeles Film Festival.

McEwan is also an award winning narrator who has lent her voice to various audiobooks spanning genres such as fiction, fantasy, drama and more, including works by Maeve Binchy and Paula McLain. In 2016 she voiced the character of Helene in A Torch Against The Night, the second book in the An Ember in the Ashes Quartet by Sabaa Tahir, the #1 New York Times bestselling author. Katharine went on to voice Helene in the final two books of the series, A Reaper at the Gates (2018) and A Sky Beyond the Storm (2020). The series has been translated into over thirty-five languages, and is described by The Washington Post as “...a harrowing, haunting reminder of what it means to be human—and how hope might be kindled in the midst of oppression and fear." Of Katharine's narration, Audiofile Magazine wrote that "...it is McEwan as Helene, the Blood Shrike, that delivers the most masterful performance. Each time Helene is forced to choose between her happiness and her duty, McEwan perfectly captures the turmoil that her choice engenders, as well as the sorrow and regret she feels for the path not taken." In 2020 Katharine narrated Ros Anderson's debut novel The Hierarchies. Set in a recognizable near future, it follows Sylv.ie, a fully sentient robot, designed to cater to her human Husband's every whim. The film and TV rights have been optioned by Margot Robbie's company LuckyChap, SK Global, and Mazur Kaplan.

Katharine co-wrote the WWII movie Hell Hath No Fury with Roman Serir, directed by Jesse V. Johnson and starring Nina Bergman and Daniel Bernhardt. The film was released in theaters and on major streaming platforms in November 2021 and distributed by WellGo Entertainment. Hell Hath No Fury is the story of Marie, a woman alone facing the power of the German war machine, the French resistance and a band of American infantrymen.

McEwan collaborated with director Jesse V. Johnson again on the Bruce Willis action film White Elephant starring Michael Rooker, John Malcovich and Olga Kurylenko. It was released in the United States by RLJE Films and AMC+ on June 3, 2022.

== Personal life ==
McEwan is married to Sasha Krane and resides in Los Angeles, California.

== Filmography ==
=== Film ===
Year	Title	Role	Director	Notes
2007	Sinners	Katherine Novack	Tory Christopher	
2010	Pluto	Emily	Heather de Michele	Short film
2011	Alien Armageddon	Jodie Elliott	Neil Johnson	
2012	The Last War Crime	Jennifer Arrow	The Pen	
2012	Potluck	Diana	Scott Essman	TV movie
2013	Clubhouse	Madeline	Yuri Shapochka	
2014	You're Not You	Sarina	George C. Wolfe	
2015	Solitary	Nora/writer/producer	Sasha Krane	
2016	Shoshannah's Skateboard		Kate Ascott-Evans/Producer	Short film
2016	Emotional State	Counselor Lyon	Dedi Felman	Short film
2017	Swim	Jeanine, producer	Mari Walker	Short film
2021	Hell Hath No Fury	Co-writer	Jesse V. Johnson	
2022	White Elephant	Co-writer	Jesse V. Johnson	
2024	Space Command Redemption	Odara T'Lynn	Elaine Zicree and Marc Scott Zicree	

== Awards and nominations ==
Year	Awards	Category	Recipient	Outcome
2012	Stay Tuned TV Awards	Best Actress	Pluto	Won
2015	London Independent Film Festival	Best UK Feature	Solitary	Won
2015	Portsmouth International Film Festival	Best Feature Screenplay	Solitary	Won
2015	Portsmouth International Film Festival	Best Actress	Solitary	Nominated
2015	Women's International Film & Arts Festival	Best Narrative Feature	Solitary	Won
2015	WorldFest Houston	Best Dramatic Feature	Solitary	Won
2015	WorldFest Houston	Best Actress	Solitary	Nominated
2015	International Film Festival of Wales	Best Feature	Solitary	Won
2015	Idyllwild International Festival of Cinema	Best Feature	Solitary	Won
2015	Idyllwild International Festival of Cinema	Best Screenplay	Solitary	Won
2015	Idyllwild International Festival of Cinema	Best Actress	Solitary	Nominated
2015	Columbia Gorge International Film Festival	Best Narrative Feature	Solitary	Won
2015	DetectiveFEST Moscow	Best UK Feature	Solitary	Won
2015	Hawaii European Cinema	Best Independent Film	Solitary	Won
2016	Rhode Island International Film Festival	Hearts, Minds, Souls Award	Shoshannah's Skateboard	Won
2016	Columbia Gorge International Film Festival	Best Family Film	Shoshannah's Skateboard	Won
2017	West Coast International Film Festival	Best Actress	Solitary	Won
2017	West Coast International Film Festival	Best Drama	Solitary	Won
2017	Los Angeles Film Festival	Best Narrative Short	Swim	Won
2017	International Filmmaker Festival of World Cinema, Berlin	Best Supporting Actress	Emotional State	Nominated
2017	Columbia Gorge International Film Festival	LGBT Advocacy Award	Swim	Won
2018	Idyllwild International Festival of Cinema	Best Supporting Actress	Swim	Won
2018	Idyllwild International Festival of Cinema	Best Short Film	Swim	Nominated
