= Readergirlz =

Online book community for adolescents

Readergirlz is an online book community that is an advocate for literacy in teenage girls. The site was founded on March 1, 2007 by Dia Calhoun, Janet Lee Carey, Lorie Ann Grover, and Justina Chen Headley. The site is a partner of the Young Adult Library Services Association. Readergirlz hosts authors monthly for an exchange with teens and administers special literacy projects, including the support of Teen Read Week, the third week of October, and Support Teen Literature Day in April.

== Awards ==
- $2,500 James Patterson PageTurner Organization Award
- $2,500 National Book Foundation 2009 Innovations in Reading Prize

== Authors featured ==
Author	Title	Theme	Date
Anderson, Laurie Halse	Prom	Risk-Taking	2008/06
Asher, Jay	Thirteen Reasons Why	Compassion	2008/10
Bingham, Kelly	Shark Girl	Triumph	2008/04
Black, Holly	Ironside	Imagine	2008/08
Bray, Libba	The Sweet Far Thing	Risk-Taking	2009/10
Booth, Coe	Kendra	Self discovery	2009/08
Cabot, Meg	How to Be Popular	Self-Respect	2008/12
Caletti, Deb	The Secret Life of Prince Charming	Truth	2010/04
Calhoun, Dia	The Phoenix Dance	National Mental Health Month	2007/05
Carey, Janet Lee	Dragon's Keep	Speak Out	2008/06
Carvell, Marlene	Sweetgrass Basket	Native American Heritage Month	2009/11
Cashore, Kristin	Graceling	Triumph	2009/09
Castellucci, Cecil	The Plain Janes	Creativity	2009/06
Cohn, Rachel	Nick & Norah's Infinite Playlist	Spontaneity	2008/10
Dessen, Sarah	Just Listen	Truth	2008/05
Donnelly, Jennifer	A Northern Light	Courage	2009/01
Garcia, Rita Williams	No Laughter Here	Resilience	2009/02
Grimes, Nikki	Bronx Masquerade	Self-Worth	2008/02
Grover, Lorie Ann	On Pointe	Verse Novels	2007/04
Hale, Shannon	Book of a Thousand Days	Honor	2008/05
Headley, Justina Chen	Nothing But The Truth (and a few white lies)	Gutsy Girls	2007/03
Draper, Sharon	Copper Sun	Determination	2010/02
Hopkins, Ellen	Impulse	Hope	2009/04
Larson, Kirby	Hattie Big Sky	Hope	2008/01
Levithan, David	Nick & Norah's Infinite Playlist	Spontaneity	2008/10
Lockhart, E.	The Disreputable History of Frankie Landau-Banks	Risk Taking	2010/01
McCormick, Patricia	Sold	Strength	2007/09
Miller, Sarah	Miss Spitfire	Give	2007/12
Pearson, Mary	The Adoration of Jenna Fox	Identity	2009/03
Pierce, Tamora	Daughter of the Lioness	Independence	2009/12
Reinhardt, Dana	A Brief Chapter in my Impossible Life	Family	2007/11
Resau, Laura	Red Glass	Family	2009/05
Rugg, Jim	The Plain Janes	Creativity	2009/06
Schorr, Melissa	Goy Crazy	Fun	2007/07
Walker, Melissa	Violet Series: Violet on the Runway, Violet by Design, Violet in Private	Body Image	2008/08
Westerfeld, Scott	Leviathan	Self-discovery	2010/03
Yee, Lisa	Absolutely Maybe	Hope	2010/05
Yoo, Paula	Good Enough	Tolerance	2008/09
Zarr, Sara	Sweethearts	Truth	2009/06
