= Winterkeep (novel) =

2021 novel by Kristin Cashore

- First US Edition
- Author: Kristin Cashore
- Cover artist: Kuri Huang
- Language: English
- Genre: Fantasy
- Publisher: Dial Books (US); Gollancz Books (UK)
- Publication date: January 19, 2021
- Media type: Print (Hardback and Paperback)
- Pages: 528 (first edition, hard cover)
- ISBN: 978-0-803-74150-8 (first edition, hard cover)
- Preceded by: Bitterblue
- Followed by: Seasparrow

Winterkeep is a 2021 young adult fantasy novel written by American author Kristin Cashore, the fourth in the Graceling Realm series. Winterkeep follows Bitterblue, the queen of Monsea, and Lovisa Cavenda, the daughter of influential politicians, as they investigate different suspicious deaths and occurrences in the nation of Winterkeep.

== Plot ==
Winterkeep occurs several years after Bitterblue concludes. It is set outside the five kingdoms of the earlier books in the series in the nation of Winterkeep, which is separated from Monsea by the ocean. Winterkeep is a democratic republic known for airship travel and its relationships with telepathic animals.

The story begins when two Monsean envoys sent by Queen Bitterblue die under suspicious circumstances while attempting to establish diplomatic relations. In response, Bitterblue travels to Winterkeep on a diplomatic mission with her allies, including Hava and Giddon, to investigate. During the journey, Bitterblue is lost overboard and presumed dead, but she survives and is secretly taken captive. Her disappearance further complicates the diplomatic situation as Hava and Giddon investigate.

Meanwhile, the story follows Lovisa Cavenda, the teenage daughter of two influential Winterkeep politicians affiliated with opposing political factions- the Scholars and the Industrialists. Raised in a highly controlled and abusive environment, Lovisa is being prepared for a future in politics. She becomes more aware of the tensions surrounding industrial development and the use of the banned fuel 'zilfium', and begins to question her family’s actions and the broader political system of Winterkeep.

The novel also incorporates the perspective of telepathic blue foxes, who are known to bond with humans. However, these foxes maintain a highly secretive truth of the nature of their abilities. One fox, Adventure, plays a significant role in connecting the two narratives- gathering information and quietly assisting both Lovisa and Bitterblue while concealing the extent of the foxes’ telepathic capabilities.

As the investigation unfolds, it becomes clear that the envoys’ deaths were part of a larger conspiracy involving political manipulation, environmental concerns, and control of resources. Evidence gradually reveals the involvement of high-ranking officials, including members of Lovisa’s family. Lovisa ultimately chooses to act against her parents.

At the climax of the story, Bitterblue is located and rescued, and the political plot brought to light. The aftermath includes consequences for those involved and a reassessment of relationships within Winterkeep and between nations. Lovisa also begins to redefine her identity independent of her upbringing, and the story concludes with an emphasis on political accountability, ethical governance, and evolving human and nonhuman relationships.

== Characters ==
- Queen Bitterblue: Queen of Monsea who travels to Winterkeep to investigate the deaths of her envoys.
- Lovisa Cavenda: A teenage political student and daughter of powerful officials from each faction.
- Adventure (Ad): A sentient, telepathic blue fox bonded to Lovisa’s mother.
- Hava: Bitterblue’s half-sister and a spy who accompanies Bitterblue to Winterkeep and assists in the investigation.
- Giddon: A Monsean courtier and advisor who accompanies Bitterblue to Winterkeep and participates in the investigation.
- Katu Cavenda: A native of Winterkeep, connected to both Bitterblue and the Cavenda family.
- Ferla Cavenda: President of Winterkeep and a leading figure in the Scholar faction; Lovisa’s mother.
- Benni Cavenda: An Industrialist politician; Lovisa’s father.

== Reception ==
Winterkeep has received generally positive reviews, with many praising Cashore's consistently strong world building and relatable characters that the Nerd Weekly calls 'frustratingly loveable'. Shelf Awareness highlights "Cashore's fourth Graceling novel features two strong, but very different, female protagonists" while Kirkus Reviews also states "Cashore excels at finely drawn characters and realistic portrayals of toxic parents’ effect on their children."

A majority do agree that this novel was not as strong as her previous three books (Graceling, Fire, and Bitterblue). This is mostly attributed to issues with plot or pacing issues that arose as a result of the introduction of multiple points of view, which is a diversion from her first three novels in this series. A review by Dear Author states "There were more subplots than the book could do justice to."

In 2023, Winterkeep was listed as one of several books banned from some Iowa Schools in response to SF 496.

The Boston Public Library and Shelf Awareness named it one of the best young adult books of 2021.
