= Shark Girl =

Shark Girl may refer to:

- Daffney (1975–2021), professional wrestler
- Shark Girl (novel), a 2007 novel in verse by Kelly Bingham
- "Shark Girl," a character by Casey Riordan Millard
- Shark-Girl, Brazilian mutant super-heroine from Marvel Comics
