= The Last Summer of the Death Warriors =

2010 novel by Francisco X. Stork

The Last Summer of the Death Warriors is a young adult novel by Mexican-American author Francisco X. Stork. It was published in 2010 by Arthur A. Levine Books, an imprint of Scholastic. The novel focuses on Pancho Sánchez, a seventeen-year-old orphan who seeks revenge for his sister's death. It was included on Publishers Weekly's list of the best children's books of 2010 and was selected for the American Library Association's 2011 Best Fiction for Young Adults list. In 2011, it won the Amelia Elizabeth Walden Award, presented by the Assembly on Literature for Adolescents of the National Council of Teachers of English.

== Plot ==
Seventeen-year-old Pancho Sánchez is orphaned following the deaths of his father and sister. His sister's death is officially undetermined, but Pancho believes a man is responsible and plans to kill him. After being sent to St. Anthony's Home, Pancho is assigned to care for D.Q., a teenager suffering from brain cancer. D.Q. adopts a philosophy he calls the "Death Warrior" as he confronts his illness and seeks to make sense of his life. He later asks Pancho to accompany him to Albuquerque, where he is to undergo experimental treatment.

Pancho accompanies D.Q. to Albuquerque for the treatment, partly for the money and partly to pursue his search for his sister's killer. During the trip, he grows closer to D.Q. and meets Marisol at the recovery house where they stay. His experiences with D.Q. and Marisol complicate his plans for revenge and force him to confront the circumstances surrounding his sister's death.

== Reception ==
Publishers Weekly awarded the novel a starred review, commenting on its characterization and exploration of faith, responsibility, and relationships. The publication was included it in its list of Best Children's Books of 2010.

Kirkus Reviews praised the novel's prose and the relationship between Pancho and D.Q., while criticizing aspects of the characterization, including Pancho's repeated references to his own intelligence and the portrayal of D.Q. and Marisol.

In a review for The Guardian, Marcus Sedgwick discussed the novel's treatment of mortality and its portrayal of the two central characters, Pancho and D.Q.

The novel was included in the American Library Association's 2011 Best Fiction for Young Adults list.
