= Witches Steeped in Gold =

2021 novel by Ciannon Smart

- First edition
- Author: Ciannon Smart
- Language: English
- Genres: Young adult, Dark fantasy
- Publisher: HarperCollins
- Publication date: April 20, 2021
- Publication place: Jamaica/UK
- ISBN: 978-0-06-294598-3
- Followed by: Empress Crowned in Red

Witches Steeped in Gold is a 2021 young adult dark fantasy novel by British Jamaican writer Ciannon Smart. Smart's debut novel inspired by Jamaican mythology was published on 20 April 2021 by HarperCollins and follows two enemy witches who must enter an alliance to fight a common enemy. It was followed by a sequel, Empress Crowned in Red released on June 7, 2022.

== Development ==
Smart first had the early inspiration for novel when she went on her second family trip to Jamaica when she was 12 years old and she did not start writing until she read An Ember in the Ashes. When she was on the trip to Jamaica, she visited Rose Hall and became obsessed with the idea of Black witches. In writing the book she made several research about Obeah and Jamaican culture. In an interview Smart stated that she was compelled to continue with the novel without fear after she heard the announcement of Children of Blood and Bone because it gave her hope about writing something different from the ones she had seen.

== Plot ==
Iraya has spent her life in a cell, but every day brings her closer to freedom - and vengeance.

Jazmyne is the Queen's daughter, but unlike her sister before her, she has no intention of dying to strengthen her mother's power.

Sworn enemies, these two witches enter a precarious alliance to take down a mutual threat. But power is intoxicating, revenge is a bloody pursuit, and nothing is certain - except the lengths they will go to win this game.

This Jamaican-inspired fantasy novel follows two enemy witches who form an alliance to defeat a common enemy.

== Reception ==
The book received generally positive reactions from reviewers and readers. It was one of the most anticipated books of 2021, and was recommended by several media outlets including The Mary Sue and USA Today.

A review from Tor.com stated that "Witches Steeped in Gold is a vicious series opener from a powerful debut novelist." A review from Kirkus Reviews called the novel "A richly realized tale for patient readers who enjoy complex language and worldbuilding". Publishers Weekly praised Ciannon Smart's worldbuilding stating that "Smart’s ornate world succeeds in its fantastical backdrops and frequent action".
