= Francisco X. Stork =

Mexican-American writer

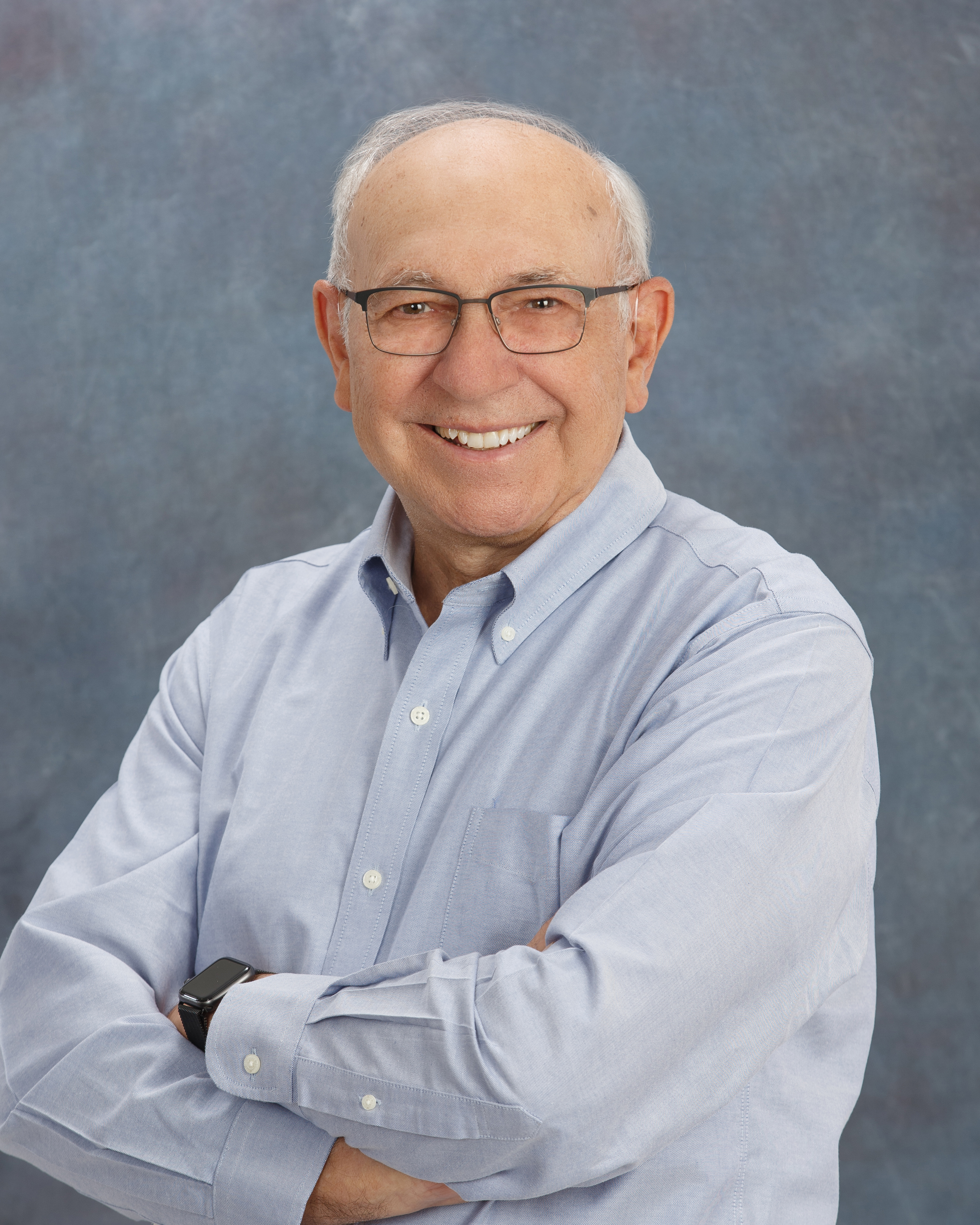
- Born: Francisco Xavier Arguelles; 1953 (age 72–73); Monterrey, Mexico
- Education: Spring Hill College (BA); Harvard University (graduate studies); Columbia Law School (JD)
- Occupations: Writer, novelist, attorney (retired)
- Spouse: Jill Syverson-Stork
- Children: 2
- Writing career
- Language: English
- Genre: Young adult fiction
- Notable works: Marcelo in the Real World, Disappeared, The Memory of Light
- Notable awards: Schneider Family Book Award (2010); Walter Dean Myers Award Honor Book (2018); Walden Award - ALA
- Website: franciscostork.com

Francisco Xavier Stork (né Francisco Xavier Arguelles, born 1953) is a Mexican-American writer. He is best known for his award-winning 2009 book, Marcelo in the Real World. He is the author of eleven novels, including Disappeared, a Walter Dean Myers Award Honor Book, and One Last Chance to Live, published in September 2024.

== Early life and education ==
Stork was born in Monterrey, Mexico. At the age of six, he was adopted by Charles Stork, a retired American citizen who married his mother, Ruth Arguelles. The family subsequently moved to El Paso, Texas.

At thirteen years old, Stork received a scholarship to the local Jesuit High School. He rose to the top of his class, and eventually received a full-ride scholarship to Spring Hill College, a Jesuit college in Mobile, Alabama, where he studied English Literature and Philosophy. There, he won his first prize in creative writing.

In 1975 he obtained a Danforth Graduate Fellowship which allowed him to attended Harvard University where he earned a master's degree in Latin American literature. After Harvard, he obtained a Juris Doctor from Columbia Law School. He practiced law for thirty-three years including fifteen with the Massachusetts affordable housing agency from where he retired in 2015. Eight of his novels were written while working as an attorney.

== Writing career ==
Stork published his first novel, The Way of the Jaguar, in 2000. He subsequently established a career as a young adult novelist, writing fiction that frequently centers on young people confronting family difficulties, social pressures, disability, loss, and questions of identity and purpose. His novel Marcelo in the Real World, published in 2009, brought him wider recognition and received the Schneider Family Book Award from the American Library Association.

The Last Summer of the Death Warriors followed in 2010 and received the Amelia Elizabeth Walden Award. The Memory of Light, published in 2016, received the Tomás Rivera Book Award. Disappeared (2017) was named a Walter Dean Myers Award Honor Book and received the Young Adult Book Award from the Texas Institute of Letters. Its sequel, Illegal (2020), received the in the Margins Book Award, the Texas Institute of Letters Young Adult Book Award, and the International Latino Book Award. On the Hook (2021) also received the International Latino Book Award.

=== Marcelo in the Real World ===
Marcelo in the Real World follows Marcelo Sandoval, a seventeen-year-old with autism who is required by his father to work in the mailroom of a law firm during the summer. The novel explores Marcelo's experiences with work, relationships, morality, and independence. It received the 2010 Schneider Family Book Award and the Once Upon a World Children's Book Award for Young Adults. It was also selected for several annual lists and honors, including the New York Times Notable Children's Books list, the Washington Post's Best Kids' Books, a YALSA Best Book for Young Adults, and ''Booklist'' Editors' Choice.

=== Later works and recognition ===
Stork continued to write novels addressing the experiences of Latino and Mexican American young people. The Memory of Light centers on a teenager recovering from a suicide attempt, while Disappeared and Illegal examine violence, immigration, and family relationships. On the Hook concerns a teenager navigating family responsibilities and personal relationships.

I Am Not Alone, published in 2023 by Scholastic Press in September and follows a seventeen-year-old boy dealing slow descent into schizophrenia while being falsely accused of murder.

One Last Chance to Live, his 2024 novel, centers on Nico, a Bronx high school student who aspires to become a writer while dealing with the death of a friend, his mother's cancer diagnosis, and his younger brother's involvement with a gang. The novel was selected as a Junior Library Guild Gold Standard Selection.

== Publications ==
- The Way of the Jaguar (2000)
- Behind the Eyes (2006)
- Marcelo in the Real World (2009)
- The Last Summer of the Death Warriors (2010)
- Irises (2012)
- The Memory of Light (2016)
- On the Hook (2021)
- I Am Not Alone (2023)
- One Last Chance to Live (2024)

=== Disappeared series ===
- Disappeared (2017)
- Illegal (2020)

=== Anthology contributions ===
- What You Wish For: A Book for Darfur (2012)
- Two and Twenty Dark Tales: Dark Retellings of Mother Goose Rhymes (2012)
- Open Mic: Riffs on Life Between Cultures in Ten Voices, edited by Mitali Perkins (2013)
- Life Inside My Mind: 31 Authors Share Their Personal Struggles, edited by Jessica Burkhart (2018)
- "Captain, My Captain" in Unbroken: 13 Stories Starring Disabled Teens, edited by Marieke Nijkamp (2018)
- Ab(solutely) Normal, edited by Nora Shalaway Carpenter and Rockey Callen (2023)

=== Awards and honors ===
Five of Stork's books, plus two audiobooks, are Junior Library Guild selections: On the Hook, Disappeared, The Memory of Light, The Last Summer of the Death Warriors, and Marcelo in the Real World.

Four of his books have been included in lists of the best young adult books of the year. Publishers Weekly included Marcelo in the Real World on their 2009 list and The Last Summer of the Death Warriors on their 2010 list. Bank Street College of Education named The Last Summer of the Death Warriors one of their Best Books of 2011 for ages 12-14. Kirkus Reviews named The Memory of Light one of the best teen books of 2016 and Disappeared one of the best teen books of 2017. The Chicago Public Library also named Disappeared one of the best young adult books of the year.

Year	Title	Award/Honor	Result	Ref.
2009	Marcelo in the Real World	Booklist Editors’ Choice: Books for Youth	Selection	
2010	Marcelo in the Real World	Amazing Audiobooks for Young Adults	Selection	
2010	Marcelo in the Real World	Best Books for Young Adults	Top 10	
2010	Marcelo in the Real World	Schneider Family Book Award for Teen Book	Winner	
2011	The Last Summer of the Death Warriors	Best Books for Young Adults	Top 100	
2011	The Last Summer of the Death Warriors	Amelia Elizabeth Walden Award	Finalist	
2017	The Memory of Light	Amazing Audiobooks for Young Adults	Top 100	
2017	The Memory of Light	Américas Award	Commended Title	
2017	The Memory of Light	Best Fiction for Young Adults	Top 100	
2018	Disappeared	Best Fiction for Young Adults	Top 100	
2018	Disappeared	Walter Dean Myers Award	Honor	
