= Janet Lee Carey =

American author

- Born: January 11, 1954 (age 72); New York City, U.S.
- Occupations: Writer, educator
- Writing career
- Genres: Children's literature, fantasy
- Notable works: Dragon’s Keep, Dragonswood, In the Time of the Dragon Moon, Wenny Has Wings, The Beast of Noor, The Dragons of Noor
- Website: janetleecarey.com

Janet Lee Carey (born January 11, 1954) is an American writer of fantasy fiction for children and young adults. Her Wilde Island trilogy—Dragon’s Keep, Dragonswood, and In the Time of Dragon Moon—earned multiple starred reviews and were ALA Best Books for Young Adults. Other notable works include the Noor duology—The Beast of Noor and The Dragons of Noor and the standalone books Stealing Death and Wenny Has Wings, a Mark Twain Award recipient and a Sony Feature Film Japan, 2008.

== Personal life and background ==
Carey grew up in Mill Valley, California. She was inspired to write during her childhood.

“I remember the giddy feeling of knowing what I wanted to do for the rest of my life and not having a clue about how to get from inspiration to publication.”

Carey moved frequently during her college years, attending Sonoma State University before relocating to Vancouver, BC, to attend Simon Fraser University. She completed her education in Seattle, graduating magna cum laude from Seattle Pacific University in 1981. She and her husband remained in the Pacific Northwest to raise a family near lakes, forests, and hiking trails.

== Career ==
Carey has taught at Lake Washington Technical College and Bellevue College, and she leads professional seminars and workshops designed for children and adults. Carey is involved in the Society of Children's Book Writers and Illustrators and is a founding member of Readergirlz, an online blog that supports reading for teenage girls. She values her critique group, The Diviners, and the arts group Artemis, where writers, photographers, painters, collage artists, and sculptors meet monthly to discuss the ongoing creative process and champion each other's work. Carey also explores her interest in the creative process on her blog, Dreamwalks.

In response to decreased funding of public and school libraries, Carey created another blog, Library Lions Roar, hosting interviews with youth librarians to raise public awareness of the role libraries play in the lives of children and teens across the U.S., and to give youth librarians a place to spread word of their library programs.

Between finding time for her group work and writing, Carey enjoys presenting world-building masterclasses and teaching at writing retreats. She tours across the United States and overseas presenting at schools and children's book festivals and conferences.

== Influences ==
Carey is inspired by the works of many authors, including Ursula K. Le Guin, Juliet Marillier, Patricia A. McKillip, Kristin Cashore, and Maggie Steifvater. "I loved going on these journeys and wanted to grow up booking passage to faraway places for other young readers."

She was also inspired by Grimms' Fairy Tales, and stories involving myths and legends. Carey says, “I write novels to delve deeper into things that haunt me and keep me awake at night. Stealing Death asks the basic question: Why do we have to die? I started writing it when my mother was dying and finished the book only a few weeks before my stepfather died. I loved them both very much and didn’t want to let them go.”

== Notable works ==
=== Molly's Fire ===
==== (Atheneum Books, 2000) ====
This novel is about a young girl who is in denial about the fact that her father has died in World War II, until she is given her father's watch. Molly risks it all to find out the truth she is trying to avoid.

"Carey paints a realistic portrait of wartime deprivation on the American home front. Give this to fans of Patricia Reilly Giff's 'Lily's Crossing'." – Booklist

=== Wenny Has Wings ===
==== (Atheneum Books, 2002) ====
Will North loses his sister Wenny in a terrible accident. Will writes a series of letters to his sister in heaven. He believes her spirit is in a good place because of the vision he had during his Near Death Experience, but is he brave enough to tell his mother and father what he saw?

"Wenny Has Wings is a powerful, emotional, highly recommended story about learning to cope with grief and loss." --Children’s Bookwatch – Midwest Book Review

"A heartrending glimpse into what happens in a family when a child dies."—Kirkus Reviews

=== The Double Life of Zoe Flynn ===
==== (Atheneum Books, 2004) ====
Zoe's family is thrown into troubled times, with her father losing his job and their rental house suddenly being sold. They are forced to move to find work and meanwhile live in the family van. To escape the sad reality, Zoe creates a "double life". It is a story of courage and hardships.

"Zoe learns to cope with change, friendship, and homelessness in this poignant tale." —Kirkus Reviews

=== The Beast of Noor ===
==== (Atheneum Books, 2006), Book 1 Noor Chronicles ====
"Determined to break the Shriker's curse, Miles steals a spell from his mentor, setting in motion a complex weave of force and power well beyond this world, and drawing Miles into a journey that will require all his courage, and from which only Hanna and her ingenuity can save him. One after the other, the brash, well-intentioned hero and the plucky young heroine enter a realm of betrayal, honor, destiny, and otherworldly justice. Plot twists combine with magic, suspense, legend, challenge, and redemption. [This] will appeal most to dedicated fantasy readers." --VOYA

=== Dragon's Keep ===
==== (Harcourt Books, 2007), Book 1 Wilde Island Chronicles ====
In 1145 A.D., as foretold by Merlin, fourteen-year-old Rosalind, who will be the twenty-first Pendragon Queen of Wilde Island, has much to accomplish to fulfill her destiny, while hiding from her people the dragon's claw she was born with that reflects only one of her mother's dark secrets.

"In stunning, lyrical prose, Carey tells the story of Rosalind, a twelfth-century princess destined for greatness. . . thoroughly compelling." —Booklist, starred review

=== Stealing Death ===
==== (Egmont USA, 2009) ====
A fantasy novel based around a young boy named Kipp who has lost everything of value to him. He is left in charge of his younger sister after the rest of his family was killed in a fire. He is determined to keep those he holds close to him away from Death's soul sack.

"Quite simply fantasy at its best – original, beautiful, amazing, and deeply moving." —School Library Journal, starred review

=== The Dragons of Noor ===
==== (Egmont USA, 2010), Book 2 Noor Chronicles ====
Trouble is stirring in the world of Noor. After centuries-long exile, the dragons are uneasy and about to return. A strange wind has been blowing, sweeping children up into the sky. Among the missing is Miles's and Hanna's younger brother. They go after him and find themselves fighting alongside the dragons in a life- altering revolution.

"Miles and Hanna find themselves on another quest to save their kidnapped younger brother . . . readers . . . will gladly return to this imaginative place for another high-fantasy outing." —Booklist

=== Dragonswood ===
==== (Penguin Random House, 2012), Book 2 Wilde Island Chronicles ====
Wilde Island is in a difficult situation, with the trust between the fairies, dragons and humans, being tested with the death of the king. The island is looking for a hero and young Tess, a blacksmith's daughter, is thrown into the crossfire.

"A dark fantasy illuminated by piercing flashes of hope builds upon the well-received Dragon's Keep (2007) . . . Painful, cathartic and cautiously hopeful: a fairy tale for those who have given up on believing in them but still yearn for happily ever after." —Kirkus starred review

=== In The Time of Dragon Moon ===
==== (Kathy Dawson Books, Penguin, 2015), Book 3 Wilde Island Chronicles ====
When a hidden killer slays the royal Pendragon heir, the murder is made to look like an accident, but the queen's healer, Uma, and her ally, Jackrun, sense the darker truth. Together, they must use their combined powers to outwit a secret plot to overthrow the Pendragon throne.

"This is a must-purchase for libraries owning the earlier installments and a great choice for where teen fantasy is popular." –School Library Journal.

=== The Twelve Days of Christmas: Starring the Chickens ===
==== (Caney Creek Books, 2016) ====
An updated version of the classic Christmas carol, THE TWELVE DAYS OF CHRISTMAS: STARRING THE CHICKENS features a flock of chickens and a penguin in a pine tree within the cumulative song structure.

== Adaptations ==
Carey’s book, Wenny Has Wings (2002), was adapted into a Feature Film, "Ano Sora wo Oboeteru", or "Remember that Sky" with Sony Pictures, Japan, 2008.

== Awards and nominations ==
=== Molly's Fire (2000) ===
- Nominated for Georgia State Best Children’s Book, 2002

=== Wenny Has Wings (2002) ===
- Mark Twain Award, 2005
- Washington State Book Award Finalist, 2003
- Borders Books Original Voices, 2003

=== The Double Life of Zoe Flynn (2004) ===
- One Book Sacramento Children's Book Choice, 2009

=== The Beast of Noor (2006) ===
- NYPL Best Book for Teens, 2007

=== Dragon's Keep (2007) ===
- ALA Best Book for Young Adults, 2008
- Booklist starred review
- School Library Journal starred review

=== Stealing Death (2009) ===
- School Library Journal starred review

=== The Dragons of Noor (2010) ===
- Teens Read Too Gold Star Award for Excellence

=== Dragonswood (2012) ===
- YALSA Best Fiction for Young Adults, 2013
- Kirkus starred review
- School Library Journal starred review
