= Bitterblue (novel) =

2012 third book of the Graceling Realm fantasy series by Kristin Cashore

- First US edition
- Author: Kristin Cashore
- Cover artist: Natalie C. Sousa
- Language: English
- Series: Graceling Realm
- Genre: Fantasy, Romance
- Publisher: Dial Books (US); Gollancz Books (UK)
- Publication date: May 1st, 2012 (1st edition)
- Publication place: United States
- Media type: Print (Hardback and Paperback)
- Pages: 480 (first edition, hardback)
- ISBN: 978-0-80-373473-9 (first edition, hardback)
- Preceded by: Fire
- Followed by: Winterkeep

Bitterblue is a young adult fantasy novel written by American author Kristin Cashore. It is preceded by Graceling and Fire, and followed by Winterkeep. The book was released on May 1, 2012.

== Plot ==
Eight years after the events of Graceling, Bitterblue, now eighteen, is Queen of Monsea. She is determined to restore peace and justice to her land, and rebuild the kingdom left in ruins by her father, King Leck. Her advisors Darby, Rood, Runnemood, and Thiel seem to be keeping her in the dark, and want her to act as a figurehead. Bitterblue disguises herself as a servant and begins a truth-seeking campaign in the city. She stops at a tavern, which she learns is a story-room, where she hears stories about her kingdom and history. She meets the young thieves Teddy and Sapphire (Saf), who is also a Graceling, but oddly, does not know what his grace is. She discovers that the two young men and their cohorts are involved in an underground movement to educate the kingdom's people. Unaware of her true identity, they nickname Bitterblue "Sparks".

Bitterblue discovers new disturbing information about her father, the information he destroyed, and that her advisors are former healers who were forced to treat those Leck tortured. Lord Danzhol tries to kidnap Bitterblue, and she kills him in self-defense. Saf tells her that he only steals things formerly stolen by Leck. Teddy is stabbed, and later his family's printshop is burned down. These events are somehow connected, but the connection is elusive. Hava, who unintentionally helped in Bitterblue's attempted kidnapping, is a Graceling with a talent for disguise. Hava and Bitterblue evade an attack and Bitterblue realizes that she has romantic feelings for Saf.

Bitterblue goes to a murder trial, and finds that Saf is the one accused of murder. Saf realizes Bitterblue is the queen, not the commoner he believed her to be. When his alibi is proven and the case is over, he steals Bitterblue's crown and sells it on the black market. Bitterblue manages to decipher hidden messages from her mother and discovers the depth of her father's depravity. She visits Saf to apologize, and as she leaves she is stabbed, an assassination attempt orchestrated by Runnemood. Runnemood is later found dead and blamed for acting against Bitterblue. She suspects that she is still being lied to.

Bitterblue discovers Leck's old journals, which are written in strange, unrecognizable symbols. Bitterblue's head librarian, Death, learns that the journals are in a different language, and begins to translate them to learn Leck's secrets. When Death is attacked and many of the journals burned, Bitterblue realizes Thiel is responsible. He reveals that Leck compelled him and others to torture people for Leck's pleasure, and all of Bitterblue advisors have been responsible for silencing the truth in order to forget their painful pasts. He then commits suicide and Darby also kills himself out of guilt. Bitterblue confronts Thiel and Runnemood's remaining followers, gaining their loyalty when she forgives them for what they were forced to do, but determines that they cannot force others to suppress their past in the same way.

Bitterblue takes measures to ensure the true history of the realm is recorded. Saf and his group do their part in the city. Saf and Bitterblue spend a night together, and Bitterblue realizes Saf's Grace is the ability to give others good dreams. Katsa returns from her expedition to the unknown East behind the mountains with Lady Fire, Pikkia and others from the Dells as they are interested in allying. When they return to the Dells, Po's older brother Skye leaves with them, and Saf joins him. Bitterblue learns that Hava is her half-sister, born after Leck raped her mother, Bellamew. Bitterblue begins to found ministries to help Monsea properly recover from Leck's reign.

== Characters ==
- Queen Bitterblue: Queen Bitterblue is the daughter of Leck (Immiker), the former king of Monsea, and Ashen, the former queen of Monsea and princess of Lienid. She was born in Monsea. She is the main protagonist of the book Bitterblue.
- Thiel: Formerly an advisor to King Leck, and then to Queen Bitterblue. He was selected by Leck due to his excellence in medical studies (along with Darby, Runnemood, and Rood). He was later selected to be Queen Bitterblue's advisor by King Ror. After Bitterblue figured out some of his betrayal, he admitted to having killing Runnemood and committing crimes against Bitterblue. Thiel tragically took his own life by stepping off Winged Bridge.
- Sapphire: Also known as Saf, is a Monsean commoner raised by the Lienid. His parents were truthseekers during King Leck's reign, and he is Graced, though he doesn't know what his grace is. At the age of six months, his parents snuck him onto a Lienid ship in the hopes of saving his life. They died in the fight against Leck. Saf returned to Monsea shortly before the events of Bitterblue, looking for his sister, Bren. He spent his time since then working with Teddy, Bren, and Tilda as part of the continued truth-seeking campaign. His primary task has been stealing back the many things Leck stole. During Bitterblue, Saf meets and develops a fractious relationship with the young queen, believing her to be a commoner as well. When he finds out that she is not, their relationship deteriorates and never fully recovers. At one point, he takes in a frazzled Bitterblue into the drawbridge tower, where he learns of Thiel's suicide. He lies with her through the night. At the end of the book, he leaves with the Dellian party to seek adventure elsewhere.
- Teddy: Tilda's younger brother, and friend and colleague of Saf and Bren who do their underground work in his printing shop.
- Tilda: A young woman residing in Bitterblue City in Monsea, running a printing shop with her partner Bren and brother Teddy. During Bitterblue, she starts out printing reading lessons to combat the low literacy rate in Monsea and especially Bitterblue City. She is later contracted by Queen Bitterblue to print copies of the books that were destroyed by King Leck and restored by Death, the librarian.
- Bren: A teacher and printer in the east city, Tilda's partner, and Saf's sister. She assists in the restoration of the castle library collection.
- Madlen: A one-eyed Dellian healer who posed as a graced healer in the Monsean Court. She became a dear friend of Queen Bitterblue and saved Teddy's life after he was stabbed and nearly killed.
- Rood: Formerly an advisor to King Leck and later to Queen Bitterblue, along with Thiel, Darby, and his own brother Runnemood. Before being chosen by Leck, he was an excellent student of medicine. As such, Leck chose him to assist him in torturing people and animals. After it was revealed of his actions against Bitterblue, Rood was imprisoned along with Darby. After Darby's suicide, Rood admitted to Bitterblue that he had thought of the idea of killing himself now and then, but did not act on it as it would undoubtedly confuse and hurt his grandchildren. Understanding this, Bitterblue placed him under house arrest.
- Runnemood: Formerly an advisor to King Leck and later Queen Bitterblue, along with Thiel, Darby, and his own brother Rood. Runemood killed nine prisoners in the castle, and was one of the people responsible for killing the truthseekers. Runnemood's body had been discovered a while after he disappeared, and it was revealed that Thiel had pushed him off Winged Bridge in order to protect Bitterblue.
- Darby: Formerly an adviser to King Leck of Monsea and later to his daughter Queen Bitterblue. After his joint betrayal to Bitterblue with Thiel, Rood, and Runnemood, he and Rood were sent to prison. By the next day, Darby had hanged himself in his prison cell. Prior to his suicide, Darby had also co-authored a series of medical pamphlets, which later disappeared (presumably taken to hide the advisors' past).
- Prince Po: Prince Greening Grandemalion (or simply "Po") is the seventh son of King Ror and Queen Zinnober of Lienid. His only other known brothers by name are Prince Skye and Prince Silvern. He is the romantic partner of Katsa. He is Graced with sensing other beings, and became blind in Graceling.
- Katsa: The main protagonist of Graceling. She has one blue eye and one green eye, as well as short dark hair. She is initially believed to be Graced with killing, but her real grace is survival as she later discovers with the help of Prince Po.
- Hava: The daughter of Bellamew and King Leck. She is also the niece of Holt. She is Graced with hiding/disguise. At the end of the story it is revealed that she is also Bitterblue's half-sister.
- Holt: One of Queen Bitterblue's guards, Graced with strength. He was one of the people who helped save Bitterblue's life after she was stabbed. He, along with Thiel, Runnemood, and Rood, were involved in Leck's torturing and raping. Hava's uncle.
- Helda: Katsa's friend and former servant. She is also a part of the Council and currently a servant for Bitterblue in Monsea. She also functions as Bitterblue's spymaster, in charge of hiring the queen's personal spies and handling their correspondences. She has a very motherly personality as she cared for both Katsa and Bitterblue from a young age.

== Reception ==
Bitterblue was named a New York Times best-seller, a Kirkus Reviews and Publishers Weekly Best Book of 2012, and the 2012 American Library Association Best Fiction for Young Adults.
