= Casey Riordan Millard =

American painter (born 1973)

Casey Riordan is an American artist based in Cincinnati. She works in a variety of media, including painting, drawing, sculpture, video, and publication.

== Early life and education ==
Casey Riordan obtained a bachelor's degree in fine art in 1994 from Ohio University in Athens, Ohio.

== Career and practice ==
Riordan works in a variety of media, including painting, drawing, sculpture, video, and publication. She aims in her work to "create a temporary distraction from the weight of oneself”.

Riordan's artwork has been displayed in various cities and states such as Cincinnati, Ohio, Buffalo, New York, and Chicago, Illinois. The majority of Riordan's pieces include her original character, Shark Girl.

=== Shark Girl ===
Riordan's character, Shark Girl, appears in many of her illustrations, paintings, and sculptures. Shark Girl is a young girl with the head of a shark created in 2004. She was a way for Riordan to "reflect her own anxieties". A fiberglass sculpture of Shark Girl was built for the Ohio River Downtown with a $6,000 grant in 2012. Visitors used the piece as a photo-op, turning it to have the Ohio River in the background. Around Easter 2014, visitors began to deface Shark Girl with graffiti. The city left repairs in Riordan's hands. Soon after, Aaron Ott, the public art curator at the Albright–Knox Art Gallery in Buffalo purchased the sculpture and the museum created a fund to maintain it. The sculpture was moved to Buffalo, where it became a popular local landmark.

A 4-minute YouTube video published in 2013 entitled "Come Follow Me" features Shark Girl. The video, created for Riordan's 2012 installation at the Contemporary Arts Center's UnMuseum in Cincinnati, Ohio, follows Shark Girl on a journey leading her to a horse, which is also featured as a sculpture in the installation. The video features drawings and animation by Riordan, with editing and co-direction by Ossian Mendoza and music by John Aselin.

Shark Girl is the title character in Riordan Millard's 2014 children's book Shark Girl & Belly Button.

== Exhibitions ==
Upcoming Exhibitions	
Albright-Knox Art Gallery, Buffalo, New York	July 2017

Solo Exhibitions	
ArtWorks, Kennedy Heights Arts Center Annex, Cincinnati, Ohio	2016
Albright- Knox Art Gallery, Canalside, Buffalo, New York	2015
Thomas More College, Crestview Hills, Kentucky	2014
Angela Meleca Gallery, Columbus, Ohio	2013
Findlay Street Project Space, Cincinnati, Ohio	2013
Cincinnati Recreation Commission, Yeatman's Cove, Cincinnati, Ohio	2013
UnMuseum, Contemporary Arts Center, Cincinnati, Ohio	2012
PAC Gallery, Cincinnati, Ohio	2011
Packer-Schopf Gallery, Chicago, Illinois	2011
Herron School of Art and Design, IUPUI, Indianapolis, Indiana	2011
Weston Art Gallery, Aronoff Center for the Arts, Cincinnati, Ohio	2009
Packer-Schopf Gallery, Chicago, Illinois	2008
The Carnegie, Covington, Kentucky	2008
Aron Packer Gallery, Chicago, Illinois	2006

Group Exhibitions	
Faculty Art Show, Art Academy of Cincinnati, Cincinnati, Ohio	2016
Escape Hatch Collective, Kennedy Heights Arts Center, Cincinnati, Ohio	2015
The Fine Art of Illustration, Gallery One One, Cincinnati, Ohio	2014
Lubeznik Center for the Arts, Michigan City, Indiana	2013
SOFA Chicago, with the Packer Schopf Gallery, Chicago, Illinois	2012
John Michael Kohler Arts Center, Sheboygan, Wisconsin	2010
PAC Gallery, Cincinnati, Ohio	2010
Summerfair Group Exhibition, Funkes Fired Arts, Cincinnati, Ohio	2010
For the Birds, Northern Kentucky University, Highland Heights, Kentucky	2010
20 Years/20 Artists, Art Academy of Cincinnati, Cincinnati, Ohio	2010
UTurn Gallery, Breaking Up Is Hard To Do, Cincinnati, Ohio	2010
Evanston Arts Center, Once Upon a Time and Now, Evanston, Illinois	2009
Fuller Craft Museum, The Perfect Fit, Brockton, Massachusetts	2009
Fine arts Fund, Enjoy the Arts 20/20 Festival, Cincinnati, Ohio	2008
Columbus Metropolitan Library, Ohio Arts Council juried show, Columbus, Ohio	2008
Art Chicago, with the Packer-Schopf Gallery, Chicago, Illinois	2008
Bridge Art Fair, with the Packer-Schopf Gallery, Miami, Florida	2007
Music Show II, through Publico Gallery, Cincinnati, Ohio	2007
Art Chicago, with the Packer-Schopf Gallery, Chicago, Illinois	2007
Gen Art, Ignite! 2006 Chicago, Chicago, Illinois	2006
Art Chicago, with the Aron Packer Gallery, Chicago, Illinois	2006
University of Cincinnati, WordArt, Cincinnati, Ohio	2005
Aron Packer Gallery, Four, Chicago, Illinois	2005
The Affordable Art Fair, with the Aron Packer Gallery, NYC, New York	2004
Aron Packer Gallery, Chicago, Illinois	2003
