= All My Rage =

2022 novel by Sabaa Tahir

- First edition book cover
- Author: Sabaa Tahir
- Language: English
- Genre: Young adult
- Publisher: Razorbill
- Publication date: March 1, 2022
- Publication place: United States
- Media type: Print (hardcover and paperback), audiobook, e-book
- Pages: 384 (hardcover)

All My Rage is a contemporary young adult novel written by Pakistani-American author Sabaa Tahir. It was published on March 1, 2022 by Razorbill, an imprint of Penguin Random House. All My Rage is the fifth book written by Tahir and her first standalone book. It explores two high school students struggling to balance family, grief, love, life and a desperate desire to escape a small town that only seems to be suffocating them.

The book was a New York Times and Indie bestseller and was a winner of the 2022 Boston Globe–Horn Book Award. It also won the 2022 National Book Award for Young People's Literature, the Michael L. Printz Award, and the 2023 Amelia Elizabeth Walden Award from the Assembly on Literature for Adolescents of NCTE.

== Plot ==
All My Rage takes place in the Mojave Desert of California and is told from three points of view: Misbah in the past and Noor and Sal in the present. Sal is Misbah's son.

Sal and Noor are former friends growing up in a small desert town. Noor wants to go to college but her guardian will not let her. Sal wants to save his parents' business, a motel, but it is deep in debt. Their friendship rekindles after a tragedy, but Sal's choices, as well as Noor's secrets, threaten to tear them apart. Meanwhile, we learn about Misbah, Sal's mother, and what brought her to America.

== Reception ==
Anna P. Kambhampaty's review for The New York Times calls All My Rage a "love story, a tragedy and an infectious teenage fever dream about what home means when you feel you don't fit in." According to Kirkus Reviews, the novel "confronts head on the complicated realities of life in a world that is not designed for the oppressed to thrive in."

Jodi Picoult called the book "a gorgeous, star-crossed story about the costs of the American dream."
