= On Pointe =

2004 novel by Lorie Ann Grover

- Author: Lorie Ann Grover
- Language: English
- Genre: Children's
- Publisher: Margaret K. McElderry
- Publication date: May 25, 2004
- Publication place: United States
- Pages: 320 pp
- ISBN: 978-0-689-86525-1
- OCLC: 52386493
- LC Class: PZ7.G9305 On 2004

On Pointe is a children's novel about an aspiring ballet dancer by Lorie Ann Grover, first published in 2004.

It was nominated for the 2006 Dorothy Canfield Fisher Children's Book Award.

== Plot summary ==
This story is told in free verse. The novel centers on 16-year-old Clare, who has dreamed of becoming a dancer all her life and has worked hard to achieve her dreams. She hopes to be selected for City Ballet, a program for very skilled dancers, although there are only sixteen positions available. After a growth spurt, she is judged too tall for professional ballet and advised to take a dance class for adult amateurs. It seems her dream is crushed, but when her grandfather has a stroke, losing the ability to talk and move his right side, her perspective alters.

== Reception ==
School Library Journal said that the novel was "finely written", and commented of the main character that "the teen's voice rings true". Publishers Weekly described it as "well-wrought" with "an air of authenticity". Booklist was less positive, feeling that the grandfather's stroke was "perhaps overly convenient" and that the "shift in focus from ballet-studio pressures to family dynamics feels a bit jarring". Kirkus Reviews said that the protagonist was "almost too good to be true, but she'll appeal to teens interested in dance".
