= A Torch Against the Night =

2016 novel by Sabaa Tahir

- First edition book cover
- Author: Sabaa Tahir
- Language: English
- Series: An Ember in the Ashes series
- Genre: Young adult, romantic fantasy, low fantasy
- Publisher: Razorbill
- Publication date: August 30, 2016
- Publication place: United States
- Media type: Print (hardcover and paperback), audiobook, e-book
- Pages: 452
- ISBN: 978-1-101-99887-8
- OCLC: 948088459
- LC Class: PZ7.1.T33 To 2016
- Preceded by: An Ember in the Ashes
- Followed by: A Reaper at the Gates

A Torch Against the Night is a young adult fantasy romance novel written by Pakistani-American author Sabaa Tahir. It was published on August 30, 2016, by Razorbill, an imprint of Penguin Random House. It is the second book in the An Ember in the Ashes series, preceded by An Ember in the Ashes and followed by A Reaper at the Gates. The story follows three different first-person narrators: former slave Laia, determined to free her brother from prison; former Empire soldier Elias, who has deserted to help Laia; and Helene, the reluctant Blood Shrike for the Empire and Elias's former best friend, who has been tasked with hunting him down.

== Plot ==
The second book in the Ember Quartet picks up where the first book left off. Laia, a Scholar, and Elias, a Martial, are running for their lives from the Empire. They plan to head to Kauf prison, where they will attempt to free Darin, Laia's brother. Darin has special skills as a blacksmith that make him essential to the Scholars' survival.

Meanwhile, the story also follows Helene Aquilla, who was Elias's best friend and has now been charged by the new Emperor—her old enemy Marcus—with hunting Elias down. With help from her friends Faris and Dex, Helene begins the difficult task. The Commandant Keris Veturia—Elias's mother and Emperor Marcus's recently promoted lieutenant—makes things more difficult by assigning a man named Avitas Harper to accompany Helene.

Along the way, Laia and Elias face the agents of their enemies—Emperor Marcus, the Commandant, and even supernatural creatures who are hunting Laia for reasons she doesn't yet understand.

== Development ==
Tahir has stated the global refugee crisis, her childhood, news about child soldiers and the novel On Killing inspired A Torch Against the Night.

== Reception ==
Publishers Weekly, in a starred review, stated the novel "has a darker tone and even higher stakes than its predecessor, setting the stage for a thrilling conclusion." Kirkus Reviews called the novel "An excellent continuation of a series seemingly designed for readers of the political, bloody fantasy style du jour, set apart by an uncommon world." The A.V. Club, TheGuardian.com and The Christian Science Monitor praised the novel's way of subverting the young adult fiction genre's clichés.

A Torch Against the Night is included in Time magazine's list of The 100 Best Fantasy Books of All Time.
