= Marcelo in the Real World =

2009 novel by Francisco X. Stork

- Author: Francisco X. Stork
- Language: English
- Genre: Young adult fiction
- Publisher: Scholastic Inc.
- Publication date: March 1, 2009
- Publication place: United States
- Media type: Print (hardcover)
- Pages: 320
- ISBN: 978-0-545-05474-4

Marcelo in the Real World is a young adult novel by Francisco Stork. Published in 2009, this award-winning book tells the story of a summer in the life of 17-year-old Marcelo Sandoval, a boy with Asperger-like characteristics.

== Plot ==
Marcelo Sandoval, is a seventeen-year-old who hears music in his head as a result of mild autism, described as a "cognitive disorder" by his father. He attends a school that caters to the needs of special children. His father, a lawyer, confronts Marcelo about needing experience in the "real world" and Marcelo ends up working at his father's law firm. At the law firm, Marcelo meets Jasmine, who works with him in the mail room. He also meets Mr. Holmes, who runs the law firm with Arturo, and his son, Wendell, who is "about three years older" than Marcelo. Wendell, described as a character with "the emotional maturity of an eight-year-old" according to Jasmine, attempts to befriend Marcelo. Wendell, who is attracted to Jasmine, explains mating to Marcelo, and how attraction feels and works.

The book deals with Marcelo's friendship with Wendell, who pushes him to do things he doesn't like, and Jasmine, who introduces him to her family in Vermont. Eventually, Marcelo "fails" at his job, by refusing to go along with Wendell's plans. Instead, he plans on going to live in Vermont after he graduates, get a degree at a nearby college in nursing, and raise ponies on the Vermont farm to help with therapy for kids with special needs. Jasmine kisses him on the cheeks and, after the internal music had ceased ever since he started working at the law firm, it returns in "the most beautiful of melodies".

== Major characters ==
- Marcelo Sandoval, the protagonist and a naive boy, is seventeen-years-old at the beginning of the novel. He has autism.
- Jasmine, Marcelo's immediate supervisor, is a calm person, and caring toward Marcelo.
- Wendell Holmes, Stephen Holmes's son, Marcelo's coworker, is a man fascinated with women and money. He almost forces Marcelo to help him "fornicate with" Jasmine.
- Arturo, the protagonist's father, is a powerful lawyer. He has a difficult time admitting that his son has a cognitive disorder.
- Jerry Garcia, a former college friend of Arturo, helps desperate people with cases. He is the one that convinces Marcelo to help Ixtel Jaetz, and who takes him to see her when he has the chance.
- Ixtel Jaetz, was orphaned and injured in a car accident involving a Vidromek-windshield vehicle. She lives with the Sisters and is the first person that has ever ignited any type of feeling in Marcelo.
- Stephen Holmes, Wendell's father, is the other partner in the firm. He belittles Marcelo for having autism.
- Aurora, Marcelo's mother, is an Oncology nurse and supportive of him.
- Rabbi Heschel gives Marcelo advice when he needs it and speaks with him about his passion for God, even though Marcelo is Roman Catholic.

== Major themes ==
Critics said that Marcelo in the Real World deals with issues such as hypocrisy in society, morale, and sacrifice. "Stork’s story lends itself to classroom discussion about hypocrisy in society. In some ways, Marcelo’s journey parallels the life of Siddhartha Gautama", said Sari Grandstaff, a member of the Saugerties Teachers Association. According to Ilene Cooper, "Marcelo must decide whether to follow his conscience and try to right the wrong even as he realizes that decision will bring irrevocable changes to his life and to his relationship with his father." Francisco X. Stork himself said in an interview that Marcelo "is not acquainted with suffering", and his world would be described as "a saint’s world ‘before the fall’." The author also said the novel addresses the following questions: "Why is there suffering? What does it mean to have knowledge of good and evil?" Another reviewer noticed that Marcelo expresses "a moral sensibility that ultimately thwarts a bully." Lastly and "most important, he learns that sometimes being uncomfortable, or even miserable, can inspire a person to do great things".

== Real World Symbolism ==
The idea of the "real world" that Arturo is so determined to have Marcelo join is a subjective viewpoint that can only be referred to from an individual's personal opinion. What Francisco X. Stork is attempting to portray with the idea that Marcelo must join the real world, is that there is no such existence of a place where all individuals must conform; Marcelo's world was just as real as Arturo's or Jasmine's. This symbolizes the misconception that everyone revolves around the same lifestyles that relate to us personally. In order to understand Stork's purpose for writing this piece of literature, one must first understand the idea that the "real world" does not exist within a conscientious state of mind.

== Reception ==
Marcelo in the Real World received mostly positive reviews. "Stork introduces ethical dilemmas", says Publishers Weekly, "the possibility of love, and other "real world" conflicts, all the while preserving integrity of his characterizations and intensifying the novel's psychological and emotional stakes." Mary Burkey agreed, saying that it was a "perfect balance of literary worth and dramatic intensity" and an "unforgettable novel". "It is the rare novel that reaffirms a belief in goodness; rarer still is that one does so this empathetically", said Jonathan Hunt. "A blend of naivete and wisdom". James Blasingame praised, "A good read for people of all ages, but recommended for high school students due to some adult content . . . . heartwarming novel." Marcelo in the Real World received a mentionable honor for the "Amelia Elizabeth Walden Award."

The novel was adapted into an audiobook read by Lincoln Hoppe and published by the Listening Library in 2009.

== Background ==
The author was inspired to write the novel from his time living at a home that was part of L'Arche, a faith-based community where normal adults live with those with developmental disabilities. Stork said, "you learn more from them than, frankly, they learn from you . . . . [they] contribute to healing some of the things wrong in our society." In the writing process, he dealt with creating the character, Marcelo, first, gave him the diagnosis after that, and then put in a bit of religion.

== Awards and achievements ==
- Marcelo in the Real World won the Schneider Family Book Award in January 2010. This award honors an author or illustrator for a book that embodies an artistic expression of the disability experience for child and adolescent audiences. Francisco X. Stork was presented this award for his literary portrayal of Marcelo Sandoval who is diagnosed with a form of Asperger's Syndrome.
- 2010 Once Upon a World Children's Book Award, recognized for its themes of understanding and tolerance, aligning with the mission of the Simon Wiesenthal Center.
- New York Times Notable Children's Book of 2009, Highlighted for its unique storytelling and compelling character exploration.
- Washington Post Best Kids’ Books of the Year, praised for addressing ethical dilemmas and social challenges faced by young adults.
- Smithsonian Notable Book of 2009, honored for blending personal development with broader societal issues.
- A YALSA Best Book for Young Adults, 2010, Acknowledged for its appeal to teen readers through relatable struggles and personal growth.
- YALSA Top 10 Best Books for Young Adults, ranked as one of the most impactful young adult novels of the year.
- 2010 NPR.org Best Young Adult Fiction for 2009, Rrcognized for its narrative depth and unique perspective.
- 2009 Booklist Editors’ Choice, valued for literary quality and its engaging portrayal of autism.
- Horn Book Fanfare Book, acclaimed for exceptional writing and character development.
- Kirkus Best Book of 2009, highlighted for Marcelo's nuanced journey of self-discovery.
- Publishers Weekly Best Book of 2009, noted for its emotional depth and thought-provoking themes.
- School Library Journal Best Book of 2009, commended for tackling complex issues in a way that resonates with young readers.
- CBC/NCSS Notable Social Studies Trade Books for Young People 2010, celebrated for its educational value in addressing social and ethical themes.
- 2010 IRA Notable Books for a Global Society, recognized for promoting cultural and social understanding through literature.

== Bibliography ==
- Stork, Francisco (March 1, 2009). Marcelo in the Real World. New York, NY: Scholastic, Inc. p. 54. ISBN 978-0-545-05474-4.

== Film adaptation ==
A film adaptation was announced on September 1, 2026. The film will be directed by Lucía Puenzo and will star Eva Longoria and Eugenio Derbez.
