= Slay (novel) =

2019 young adult novel by Brittney Morris

SLAY
- 1st edition book cover
- Language: English
- Genre: Young adult fiction
- Published: 2019
- Publication place: United States
- Media type: Print, e-book, audiobook
- Pages: 321
- ISBN: 9781534445420
- OCLC: 1077613592

Slay (stylized as SLAY) is a young adult novel by American author Brittney Morris published in 2019.

== Plot ==
SLAY tells the story of Kiera, a black high school student who develops and maintains the online game SLAY, a VR multiplayer world where players duel using cards giving them powers based on black culture. Being tired of online racial harassment in video games, she creates the game for black gamers. When a player is killed in real life by another player, the media criticizes SLAY for being racist by excluding white players.

The story is told from multiple perspectives, including that of Kiera, her co-developer Claire, who is a computer science student in Paris, John, a professor of African American studies, and players of SLAY.

== Major themes ==
SLAY has been called "an incredibly raw and real depiction of modern black identity struggles", and is referenced as an example of a novel exploring black girlhood. It explores online harassment and racism in Video games contrasted with the pleasure of online gaming. The novel also portrays black and transgender gamers.

The book has been described as "Ready Player One meets The Hate U Give".

== Reception ==
The novel was published by Simon Pulse after a bidding war between multiple publishers.

Writing for the Book and Film Globe, Sharyn Vane called SLAY "a gaming-themed thriller and a compulsively-readable exploration of the many facets of black culture." Writing for The Seattle Times, Jordan Snowden wrote that "'SLAY' is a book I wish I had when I was younger; not only does this young adult novel tackle big conversations in an approachable way, it features a strong, self-assured, intelligent young black woman as the main character."

== Awards and nominations ==
SLAY was nominated for Young Adult Best Novel in the 2020 Ignyte Awards. It has also won several other awards.
