= An Ember in the Ashes =

2015 novel by Sabaa Tahir

- Author: Sabaa Tahir
- Cover artist: Emily Osborne
- Language: English
- Series: An Ember in the Ashes
- Genre: Young adult romantic fantasy low fantasy
- Publisher: Razorbill
- Publication date: April 28, 2015
- Publication place: United States
- Media type: Print (hardcover and paperback), audiobook, e-book
- Pages: 446
- ISBN: 978-1-59514-803-2
- OCLC: 881094189
- LC Class: PZ7.1.T33 Em 2015
- Followed by: A Torch Against the Night

An Ember in the Ashes is a young adult fantasy romance novel written by American author Sabaa Tahir. It was published on April 28, 2015 by Razorbill, an imprint of Penguin Random House. It is the first book in the An Ember in the Ashes series, followed by A Torch Against the Night. In a fantasy world inspired by Ancient Rome, the story follows a girl named Laia spying for rebels against the reigning empire in exchange for their help in rescuing her captive brother; and a boy named Elias struggling to free himself from being an enforcer of a tyrannical regime. The novel is narrated in the first-person, alternating between the points of view of Laia and Elias.

The book was a New York Times, USA Today and international bestseller. International translation rights have been sold in 30 countries as of October 2015.

== Plot ==
A Scholar girl named Laia lives in the Martial Empire with her grandparents and brother Darin in the city of Serra. Their existence is a grueling one as they are seen as second-class citizens by the ruling Martial elite. Darin is arrested by Martial forces and accused of being an anti-Empire rebel. Laia seeks out the help of the anti-Empire Resistance, and agrees to infiltrate an infamous military school for them if they help free her brother from prison.

At the school, called Blackcliff Academy, Laia meets a student named Elias Veturius. Along with his best friend Helene Aquilla and his two rivals Marcus and Zak Farrar, he has been chosen to take the Trials, a series of tests that will decide who the next ruler of the Empire is. But Elias has no wish to take the tests, or be ruler. He wants to escape the Empire.

When Elias meets Laia, the two realize that their destinies are more intertwined than they could have ever dreamed.

=== Background ===
Five hundred years ago, a warrior named Taius led the Martial clans to take over the Scholar Empire. He named himself Emperor and established his dynasty. He was called the Masked One, for the unearthly silver mask he wore to scare his enemies and the silver scims he battled with. His legend lives on at Blackcliff Academy, a school built to prepare and identify the future Emperor. The academy also serves as training ground for the Empire's deadliest soldiers—the silver-faced Masks.

=== Factions ===
Scholars – The Scholars are a race of oppressed individuals who once ruled the land that has since been occupied by the Martial Empire. Many Scholars are enslaved by the Martials, and those who are not enslaved live a difficult, poverty-stricken life. The Resistance is a secretive group made up of Scholars seeking to overthrow the Empire.

Masks – Named for the eerie silver masks that cover their faces, these soldiers are the Martial Empire's most ruthless enforcers. They fight with speed and skill that is almost inhuman. Martial children destined for Maskhood are taken from their families at the age of 6, and trained at Blackcliff Military Academy for 14 years.

Tribes – The Tribes are a group of nomads inspired by the Bedouin tribes of North Africa.

Resistance – The Resistance is a band of Scholars that work in secret to overthrow the Empire. Although elusive, they're the only weapon the Scholars have against the Empire and its soldiers.

Augurs – The Augurs are a group of 14 Martial holy men and women who are believed to be immortal and able to read minds, and who are revered as advisors and seers.

=== Characters ===
Laia – Laia is described as a Scholar living with her grandparents and brother under the brutal rule of the Martial Empire. She and her family eke out an existence in the Empire's impoverished backstreets, trying their best not to draw attention to themselves. But one night, Empire soldiers raid Laia's home—and life as she knows it changes forever.

Darin – Laia's older brother by two years and apprentice to Spiro Teluman. He designs his own weapons and keeps a

Elias – This character is described as "the finest soldier at Blackcliff Military Academy—but secretly, its most unwilling. The scion of one of the Empire's finest families, Elias wants only to be free from the tyranny he's being trained to enforce."

Helene – Helene is Blackcliff Academy's only female student and Elias's best friend.

Commandant – The cruel head of Blackcliff Academy and mother to Elias. She is considered "one of the most powerful people in the Empire."

Marcus – An ignorant soldier at Blackcliff who was one of the four chosen for the Trials. He wins and becomes Emperor at the end of the novel.

Zacharias – The twin brother of Marcus, who also competes at the Trials.

== Development ==
Tahir formed the idea for An Ember in the Ashes in 2007 and wrote the book over a period of six years. She cites her hometown Ridgecrest in the Mojave Desert, as well as music as inspirations. While working at The Washington Post, Tahir read an article about Kashmiri women whose male family members were kidnapped by the military and never returned. She asked herself what she would do if she were one of those women. The book's Martial Empire system is based on the social stratification of ancient Rome.

The book's success led to the acquisition of a sequel almost immediately after its release. The sequel, entitled A Torch Against the Night, was released in August 2017. The third book, A Reaper at the Gates, was published on June 12, 2018. The fourth and final book, A Sky Beyond the Storm, was published on December 1, 2020. A trilogy of prequel graphic novels to the series is set to be published by Boom! Studios. Its first installment, A Thief Among the Trees, co-written by Tahir and Nicole Andelfinger with art by Sonia Liao was released on July 14, 2020.

== Reception ==
=== Critical response and sales ===
An Ember in the Ashes debuted at #2 on the Young Adult New York Times Best Seller list. It debuted at #64 on the USA Today Best-Selling Books list. It was included in the Time's list of The 100 Best Fantasy Books of All Time as well as The 100 Best YA Books of All Time.

The novel has garnered generally positive reviews. The Huffington Post said "An Ember in the Ashes glows, burns, and smolders—as beautiful and radiant as it is searing." Amazon named it one of the best books of May, as well as the best young adult book of 2015 and the fourth best book of the year. The New York Times called it "a worthy novel—and one as brave as its characters". However, the Chicago Tribune found that "the characters never fully spring to life under the author's ever-present hand." CNN included the book in the list of best summer beach reads. Publishers Weekly starred review called Tahir's debut "deft and polished" and the story "brimming with political intrigue". Time (magazine) called it a "bruising ... young adult novel".

=== Awards and nominations ===
Year	Award	Category	Result	Ref
2015	Goodreads Choice Awards	Best Young Adult Fantasy & Science Fiction	Nominated	
2015	Goodreads Choice Awards	Goodreads Debut Author	Nominated	
2016	Milwaukee Teen Book Award	Best Book (Uten steiber)	Nominated	
2016	People's Choice Awards	Favorite Fantasy	Won	
2016	David Gemmell Morningstar Award	Best Newcomer	Nominated	
2016	Children's Book Council Award	Best Debut Novel	Nominated	
2018	Lincoln Ward	Best Novel	Nominated	
2018	Evergreen Teen Book Awards	Best Teen Novel Grades 9th through 12th	Nominated	
2018	The Magnolia Award	Teen Choice award	Nominated	

== Film adaptation ==
Film rights were optioned by Paramount Pictures in a seven-figure deal in 2014, well before the book's publication, and Mark Johnson (Breaking Bad, Chronicles of Narnia) has signed on to produce the film. As of April 2025, there is no information as to the progress of this production.
