= Enjoy the Arts =

- Founded: 1981
- Founder: Irma Lazarus, Phyllis Weston
- Dissolved: 2017
- Type: Non-Profit Organization
- Tax ID no.: 311040339
- Purpose: Arts
- Location(s): Cincinnati Museum Center; 1301 Western Ave, Cincinnati, Ohio, United States
- Region served: Cincinnati, Ohio
- Products: Annual membership
- Website: enjoythearts.org

Enjoy the Arts is a 501(c) nonprofit organization located in Cincinnati, Ohio. It was founded in 1981 by Irma Lazarus and Phyllis Weston, and aimed to connect young audiences with Cincinnati's arts, culture and entertainment. In 2017, Enjoy the Arts merged with ArtsWave, an arts agency and advocacy group in Cincinnati.

== About ==
The original organization made its mark as Young Friends of the Arts in the 1960s. Inspired to introduce the University of Cincinnati's College Conservatory of Music students to the Cincinnati Symphony Orchestra with Phyllis Weston and Irma Lazarus as co-founders of the organization. The two pioneering women sought to foster the next generation of arts patrons with membership costs at just a few dollars.

During the 1970s and 80s, Young Friends of the Arts became known as Enjoy the Arts (ETA), and steadily grew from offering discounted symphony tickets to University of Cincinnati college students to offering multiple discounts at more and more organizations to any student in Greater Cincinnati. By 1985, Enjoy the Arts offered $10 tickets to 30 different arts organizations to any student in the Greater Cincinnati area for a $25 membership fee. This grew Irma Lazarus' legacy of encouraging young people to appreciate and attend the arts. Irma knew that there were enough "blue hairs" (in her words) in the audience. She wanted to see more young people attending all kinds of arts events.

In 1991, Enjoy the Arts grew to three full-time staff members and during this time, the program blossomed. Executive Director Lisa J. Mullins and Assistant Director Joelle Daniel, along with Membership Outreach Coordinator Laura Foy, worked together to take the organization from a fledgling, best-kept secret to a program that was city-wide and flourishing. During this time, Enjoy the Arts gathered young professionals to find out what they would like in a membership. ETA used their input to create the START program (Sample The ARTs). START was a companion membership program to Enjoy the Arts, cost $35 and offered half-price tickets to the same 30 arts organizations offering discounts to Enjoy the Arts' student members. Arts organizations in Greater Cincinnati were looking for ways to engage YPs in their programs and this was the perfect opportunity for Enjoy the Arts to capitalize on that need. The organization became known as Enjoy the Arts/START.

In 1992, ETA/START staff began organizing social activities for members, including gatherings before performances, backstage tours, and museum visits. The organization also introduced Art for Dummies, a monthly arts education program. Activities included ballet lessons from Cincinnati Ballet and set-design presentations by students from the Playhouse.

Former members of Young Friends of the Arts wanted to reinstate their beloved organization for the modern age with Young Friends of the Arts members who had aged-out of the previous program. Enjoy the Arts was founded in 1981 to make Cincinnati's arts programs more accessible to even more audiences. Members would receive an actual coupon book that granted VIP access and two free tickets to every participating arts event in the city, as well as exclusive invites to parties and happy hours on top of year-long ticket price reduction. Various price, age, and voucher structures were implemented and tested from 1981 to 2016. At one point, Enjoy the Arts offered two memberships: "Orange" for members under 35 and young professionals and "Noir" for people of all ages. Other structures included membership costs at $50 USD for a year-long membership with a discounted student rate of $35 USD. Participating arts organizations included the Cincinnati Opera, Cincinnati Ballet, Cincinnati Symphony Orchestra & Pops, and Playhouse in the Park among others.

In April 2013, under manager Jennifer Foster, Enjoy the Arts partnered with Gaslight web developers, located in Blue Ash, Ohio, and Cincinnati branding agency We Have Become Vikings to modernize the organization even further. Enjoy the Arts underwent a brand repositioning and a website re-launch that features "an energetic new image that combines the nonprofit’s roots with attitude." For example, the organization's current brand mascot is William Shakespeare "with his face painted à la Kiss." The mantra in the new look is that "everything needs to be fun." Additionally, the site became more in tune with smart phone technology. Rather than providing coupon booklets, Enjoy the Arts posted hundreds of free tickets on their website for members to claim on a first-come, first-served basis, similar to deal of the day websites like Groupon and Living Social, and members can go back to organizations for half-price all year long. An unveiling party was held at the American Sign Museum. In addition to providing access to Cincinnati's premier arts organizations, Enjoy the Arts also hosted its own parties and events.

Enjoy the Arts was previously in residence at the Cincinnati Museum Center and was a subsidiary of the museum. In addition, the non-profit was largely supported by the Carol Ann and Ralph V. Haile, Jr./U.S. Bank Foundation, ArtsWave and Joseph-Beth Booksellers. In December 2016, Enjoy the Arts, the Cincinnati Museum Center, and ArtsWave announced a merger between Enjoy the Arts and ArtsWave. As of January 2017 the two programs were completely merged. Enjoy the Arts was merged into ArtsWave's ArtsPass program, and has since expanded the range of deals and participating businesses and arts offered to current ArtsWave donors and Enjoy the Arts members, young professional perks, and free ticket opportunities and VIP experiences. A change for Enjoy the Arts members, their new ArtsPass purchase price goes to support 100 arts organizations as part of the ArtsWave Community Campaign.

== Key people ==
- Irma Lazarus (Co-Founder)
- Phyllis Weston (Co-Founder)
