= Justina Chen =

American novelist

- Born: 1968 (age 57–58); Ridley Park, Pennsylvania, U.S.
- Education: Stanford University (BA)
- Occupations: Novelist, Executive Communications Strategist
- Writing career
- Genre: Young Adult Fiction
- Notable works: North of Beautiful, Return to Me, A Blind Spot for Boys
- Website: www.justinachen.com

Justina Chen (born 1968 in Ridley Park, Pennsylvania) is a Taiwanese-American fiction writer and executive communications consultant. She is best known for her young-adult fiction, especially North of Beautiful (2009), A Blind Spot for Boys (2014), Girl Overboard (2008), and Nothing but the Truth (and a few white lies) (2006).

== Background ==
Chen was born in Ridley Park, Pennsylvania in 1968 to Taiwanese-American parents. She later graduated Phi Beta Kappa from Stanford in Economics in only three years, where she also won the Dean's Award for Service. After graduating from Stanford, she worked as a marketing executive at Microsoft in Seattle before becoming a novelist and story consultant.

== Writing career ==
After leaving Microsoft to pursue her writing career, Chen first wrote her first book, The Patch (2006). Her first Young Adult novel, Nothing But the Truth (and a few white lies), won one of the 2007 Asian/Pacific American Awards for Literature. From 2007 to 2008, Justina toured across the United States with Olympic Gold medalist Hannah Teter to promote her upcoming book, Girl Overboard, and the "Go Overboard" challenge grants co-sponsored by Youth Venture and Burton Snowboards. North of Beautiful, her next book, won a Kirkus Book of the Year and a Barnes & Noble Book of the Year award and is widely considered her most famous work. Return to Me is said to be based loosely on events that happened to her and her family, and has received positive responses from critics. Her latest young adult book, A Blind Spot For Boys, has received generally positive reviews from critics. Chen also founded Readergirlz, a literary project targeted at girls, which won a National Book Award for innovations in reading.

In 2008, Chen returned to Microsoft as a speechwriter and communications executive for Robert J. Bach, President of Microsoft Entertainment. Four years later, she left Microsoft and returned to novel writing, executive communications and storytelling consulting. She self-published her first business book, The Art of Inspiration: Lead Your Best Story, based on her marketing and storytelling experience. She currently tours the country on a speaking tour with Robert J. Bach, and has been invited to speak at companies including Microsoft, NASDAQ, Mayo Clinic, and Disney.

== Published books ==
- The Patch (2006), illustrations by Mitch Vane. Charlesbridge ISBN 1-58089-170-5
- Nothing but the Truth (and a few white lies) (2006), Little-Brown ISBN 0-316-01131-2
- Girl Overboard (2008), Little-Brown ISBN 0-316-01129-0
- North of Beautiful (2009), Little-Brown ISBN 0-316-02506-2
- Return to Me (2013), Little-Brown ISBN 0-316-10255-5
- A Blind Spot for Boys (2014), Little-Brown ISBN 9780316102537
- The Art of Inspiration: Lead Your Best Story (2016), Sparkline Creative ISBN 0988717417
- Lovely, Dark, and Deep (2018), Arthur A. Levine Books ISBN 133813406X
- With Twice the Love, Dessie Mei (2024), HarperCollins Publishers ISBN 9780063306523
