= Kathleen Glasgow =

American writer

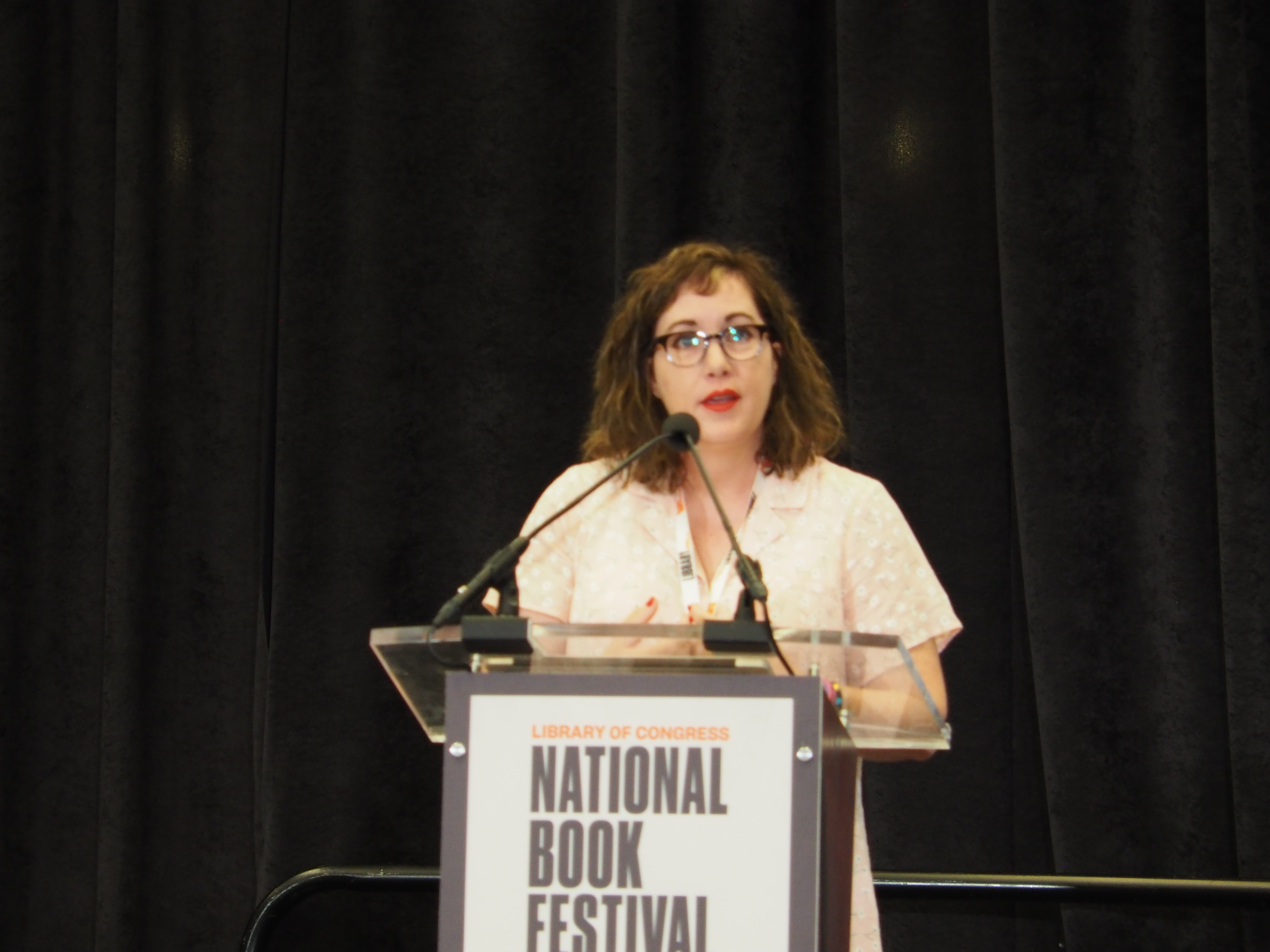
- Born: April 12, 1969 (age 57)
- Education: University of Minnesota
- Occupation: Novelist
- Writing career
- Language: English
- Genre: Young adult fiction
- Notable work: Girl in Pieces
- Website: www.kathleenglasgowbooks.com

Kathleen Glasgow (born April 12, 1969) is an American New York Times-bestselling author of young adult fiction, best known for her bestselling novel Girl in Pieces.

== Early life ==
Glasgow grew up watching Laverne & Shirley, Lenny and Squiggy, The Hardy Boys, and Mork & Mindy, among other famous duos from television series, which she cites as inspirations for The Agathas series.

She was the coordinator of the University of Minnesota's MFA in Creative Writing program for thirteen years. Before writing her first novel, she was strictly a poet.

She lives in Tucson, Arizona.

== Selected works ==
Glasgow's first young adult novel, Girl in Pieces, debuted as #1 on the New York Times bestseller list. She says the novel is about "feeling alone in the world, even if you're connecting with other people." That the protagonist struggles with depression and self harm is based on her personal struggles.

Together with author Liz Lawson, she co-authored The Agathas and its sequel The Night in Question, the first and second novels in a mystery series about two teenage girls investigating the disappearance of a girl from their school. The series debuted on the New York Times bestseller list.
