= Sabaa Tahir =

American young adult novelist

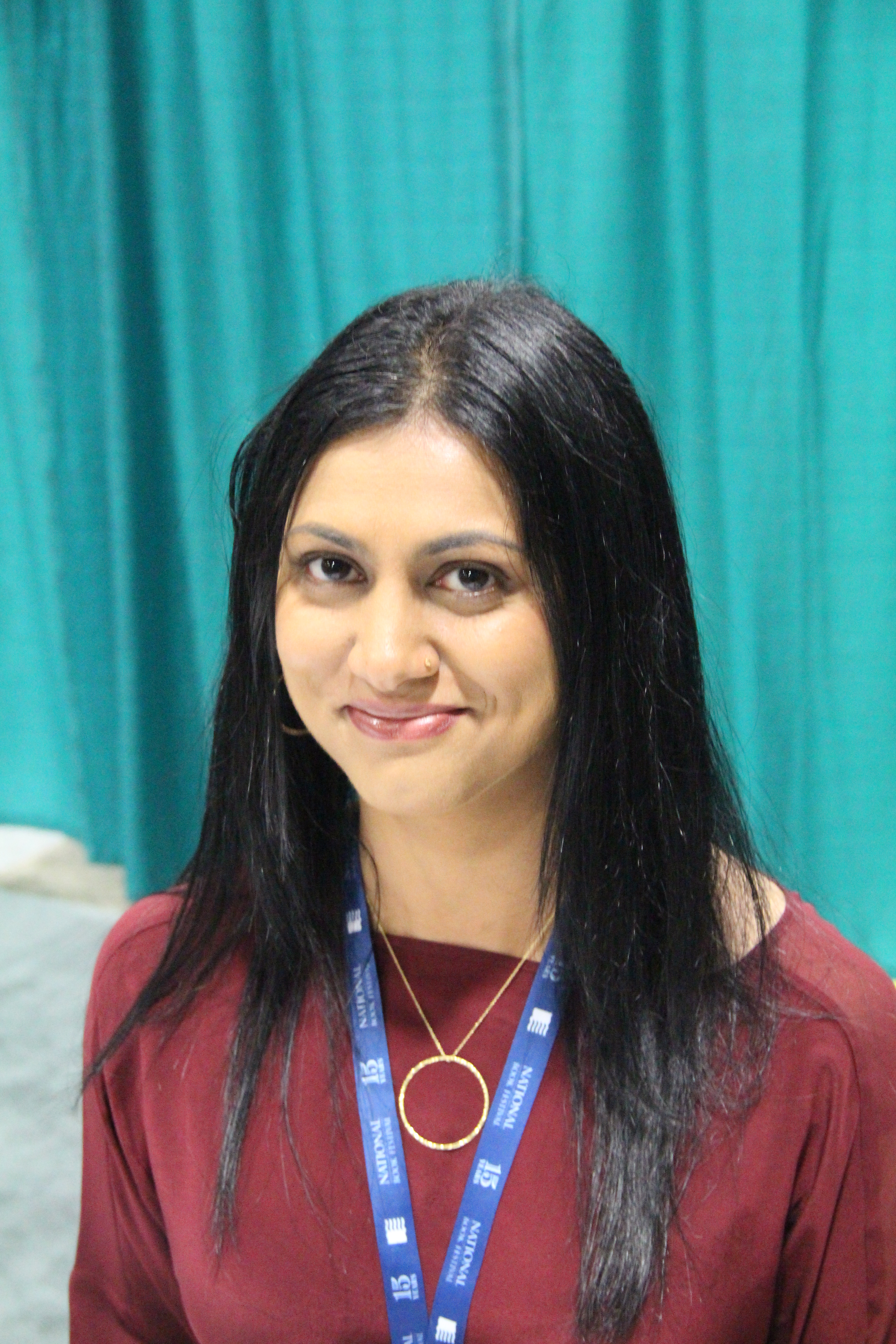
- Tahir at the 2015 National Book Festival
- Education: UCLA
- Occupation: Novelist
- Writing career
- Language: English
- Genre: Fantasy
- Notable work: An Ember in the Ashes series; All My Rage
- Notable awards: National Book Award Boston Globe–Horn Book Award Michael L. Printz Award
- Website: sabaatahir.com

Sabaa Tahir is an American young adult novelist best known for her New York Times-bestselling An Ember in the Ashes, its sequels, and the novel All My Rage.

Two of her novels, An Ember in the Ashes and A Torch Against the Night, were listed among Time Magazine's 100 Best Fantasy Books of All Time in 2020. In 2022, her novel All My Rage won the 2022 Boston Globe–Horn Book Award, the National Book Award for Young People's Literature and the Michael L. Printz Award. In 2025, her novel Heir was shortlisted for the inaugural New Adult Book Prize, won the Ignyte Award for Outstanding Novel – Young Adult, and the Libby Award for Young Adult Book of the Year.

Tahir has also published non-fiction reviews and essays in The New York Times, The Washington Post and Vox.

== Life ==
Tahir grew up in the Mojave Desert in Ridgecrest, California, with her parents and two older brothers. Her parents had emigrated from Pakistan to the United Kingdom before moving their family to the United States. She attended UCLA, during which time she interned at The Washington Post. After graduation, she took a job there as a copy editor. She currently lives in the San Francisco Bay Area.

== Bibliography ==
=== Fantasy ===
==== An Ember in the Ashes series ====
- An Ember in the Ashes. 2015.
- A Torch Against the Night. 2016.
- A Reaper at the Gates. 2018.
- A Sky Beyond the Storm. 2020.

==== Heir duology ====
(Spin-off to An Ember in the Ashes)

- Heir. 2024. – winner of the 2025 Ignyte Award for Outstanding Novel – Young Adult, and the Libby Award for Young Adult Book of the Year.
- Empire. 2026.

===== Graphic novels =====
(Prequel to An Ember in the Ashes)

- A Thief Among the Trees. 2020.
- A Spark Within the Forge. 2022.
- TBA

=== Contemporary ===
- All My Rage. 2022.

=== Short fiction ===
- "Reirin". From a Certain Point of View. Del Rey. 2017.
- Parker, Natalie C., ed. (2017). "Waiting". Three Sides of a Heart. HarperCollins.
- Chambers, Veronica; Giles, Jeff, eds. (2019). "News of the Day". The New York Times.
- Ahmed, Samira, ed. (2023). "What the Winds Stole". Magic Has No Borders. HarperTeen.
