= Shark Girl (novel) =

2007 novel by Kelly Bingham

- First edition
- Author: Kelly Bingham
- Cover artist: Anna Peisl
- Language: English
- Genre: Young adult fiction, novel in verse
- Publisher: Candlewick Press
- Publication date: April 10, 2007
- Publication place: United States
- Media type: Print Hardcover
- Pages: 276 pp
- ISBN: 0-7636-3207-4

Shark Girl (2007) is the debut novel by Kelly Bingham. It is a young adult novel in verse that tells the story of the fifteen-year-old Jane Arrowood who goes swimming at a California beach in June, is attacked by a shark and has to have her right arm amputated. The novel is told mostly through blank verse poetry that is interspersed with news articles about Jane’s attack and letters of encouragement she receives from strangers. The story is similar to—but not based upon— the life of professional surfer Bethany Hamilton who had her left arm bitten off by a shark in 2003.

== See also ==
- Bethany Hamilton
- Soul Surfer (film)
