= Graceling =

2008 book by Kristin Cashore

- Author: Kristin Cashore
- Language: English
- Series: Graceling Realm
- Genre: Fantasy, Romance
- Publisher: Harcourt
- Publication date: October 1, 2008 (1st edition)
- Publication place: United States
- Media type: Print (Hardback and Paperback)
- Pages: 480 (first edition, hardback)
- ISBN: 978-0-15-206396-2 (first edition, hardback)
- OCLC: 185123364
- LC Class: PZ7.C26823 Gr 2008
- Followed by: Fire

Graceling is a 2008 young adult fantasy novel written by American author Kristin Cashore, her literary debut.

The book earned a place on the Publishers Weekly Best Books of the Year for 2008 and received generally favorable reviews. It was followed by a prequel companion book entitled Fire. A sequel companion, Bitterblue, which takes place eight years after the events in Graceling, was published on May 1, 2012, by Dial, an imprint of Penguin Young Readers Group.

== Plot ==
Graceling takes place in a world in which people with special powers are known as Gracelings. Gracelings are identified when their eyes become two different colors. In the Middluns, Gracelings are put in the service of the king. Katsa is a young woman known for her Grace of killing. She has been in the service of her uncle, King Randa, since she was a child, tasked with executing or torturing those who oppose or displease him. She also runs the secret "Council", which aims for justice in the Seven Kingdoms.

A Council mission to save an old Lienid grandfather from a prison unearths a mystery and an unexpected Graced Lienid man whose fighting skills match Katsa's. She renders him unconscious but lets him live, despite the fact that he recognized her. He later arrives at King Randa's court, introduces himself as Prince Greening or "Po", and claims to be seeking his grandfather. Katsa fights Po, but later reveals that they have rescued his grandfather in secret. The two become friends as well as sparring partners, though Katsa feels betrayed when she discovers that Po's Grace is not fighting, but secretly a form of mind reading. When commanded to dole out an unfair punishment, Katsa defies King Randa and sets out with Po to find the true kidnappers of the old Lienid. The two determine that Katsa's Grace is not killing, but survival.

Katsa and Po follow the trail of the kidnappers, and Po's Grace reveals that the revered King Leck of Monsea has committed numerous crimes, though they simultaneously swear that Leck is innocent. Po decides that King Leck, who is one-eyed, must be secretly Graced with the power to make others believe his lies. Katsa and Po set out to rescue Po's Aunt Ashen and her daughter Bitterblue from King Leck. Katsa and Po find Leck, who kills Ashen as she flees. Katsa is overwhelmed by Leck's Graced power and they are forced to flee. Once alone, they are able to find Bitterblue hiding in the forest. Po confronts Leck, but is severely wounded and has to hide in the woods in Monsea, while Katsa and Bitterblue flee through a dangerous and inaccessible mountain pass. Katsa and Bitterblue survive the journey and get to a ship at the port of Suncliff. They convince the ship's captain that they are acting for Prince Po, and make for Po's castle.

At Po's castle, Katsa is shocked to find King Leck has taken over, and is nearly overwhelmed by his Grace. Only Katsa's love for Po enables her to kill Leck when he is about to reveal Po's secret Grace. With Leck dead, his stories are exposed as lies and Katsa and Bitterblue return to Monsea with Bitterblue as queen. They find Po in the woods, but Katsa discovers that Po is blind due to his wounds. Nevertheless, his Grace allows him to sense his surroundings, and he is able to convince the others that he can see. Katsa and Po renew their relationship, and Katsa takes on a mission to teach the girls and women of the seven kingdoms to defend themselves. The lovers promise to reunite in a few months at Po's castle.

== Characters ==
- Lady Katsa - The protagonist. Katsa's Grace is initially thought to be killing, because she accidentally killed a cousin who touched her inappropriately when she was eight. Her uncle, King Randa, forced Katsa to torture and kill any who displeased him, causing Katsa to garner a fearful reputation. Katsa and Po eventually realize that her Grace is not killing, but survival. Katsa has fair skin, dark hair and mismatched eyes, one green and one blue.
- Prince Po - Full name Greening Grandemalion, son of King Ror, and the youngest of the seven princes of Lienid. Po's Grace involves mind reading as well as spacial awareness, as he can sense both the physical world around him and other's thoughts. However, Po can only read others' thoughts on the topic of Po himself. When his mother and grandfather discovered his Po's Grace, they feared people would distrust him or use him because of it, so they taught him to pass it off as a fighting Grace. His mismatched gold and silver eyes earned him the nickname "Po", after the gold and silver leaves of the Lienid Po tree.
- King Leck - The King of Monsea and the primary antagonist of the book. Although he is renowned for his kindness towards small animals and children, Leck is actually a sadist who enjoys torturing and experimenting on people and animals alike. Leck keeps his true inclinations hidden with his powerful Grace: the ability to control people through his words. Leck is married to Ashen, King Ror's sister, and has a daughter with her, Bitterblue. Leck wears an eyepatch, which conveniently hides the fact that he is a Graceling. Leck claims that the eyepatch is due to an injury he suffered at a young age.
- Bitterblue - The 10-year-old daughter of King Leck, Princess of Monsea, and Po's cousin. Leck's Grace lost power over Bitterblue when she saw him hit her mother. Over the course of the book she grows close to Katsa and Po, her protectors and friends. She is the main protagonist in the sequel, Bitterblue.
- King Randa - King of the Middluns, Katsa's uncle, and Prince Raffin's father. Like most kings in the Seven Kingdoms, he is far from being a fair or just ruler. Randa uses Katsa to bully his citizens into submission, often commanding her to kill or maim innocent people.
- Prince Raffin - The Prince of the Middluns, Katsa's cousin, King Randa's son. Mostly ignored by his father, Raffin enjoys working on medicines and cures, a fascination he shares with his assistant and lover, Bann. He secretly works for the Council.
- Bann - Prince Raffin's assistant. It is implied that the two are lovers, which is confirmed in Bitterblue.
- Lord Giddon - One of Randa's underlords, and a member of the Council. He wants to marry Katsa and is jealous when Katsa becomes closer to Po.
- Lord Oll - Randa's captain and spymaster. He secretly works as a member of the Council. Oll helped Katsa learn how to control her Grace.
- Helda - Katsa's maidservant. Helda is also a spy and a member of the Council.
- Captain Faun - Ship captain and tradeswoman. She is a Graceling with the ability to predict storms.

== Awards and nominations ==
Graceling was shortlisted for the American Library Association's (ALA) William C. Morris YA Award, is an ALA Best Book for Young Adults, was a Cybils finalist (Fantasy/SF category), and was a finalist for both the Andre Norton Award for Young Adult Science Fiction and Fantasy (the SFWA's award for YA given concurrently with the Nebulas) and the Indies Choice Book Awards (Best Indie Young Adult Buzz Book category). Graceling won the Southern Independent Booksellers Alliance 2009 Young Adult SIBA Book Award. The book also was awarded:

- Publishers Weekly Best Books of the Year 2008
- School Library Journal Best Books of 2008
- Booklist 2008 Top Ten First Novels for Youth
- A Booklist's Editor's Choice for 2008
- 2009 Amelia Bloomer List
- 2009 Amelia Elizabeth Walden Award Finalist
- Won Mythopoeic Fantasy Award For Children's literature in 2009
- Nominated for 2010 Washington Evergreen Award
- Nominated for 2010-2011 Eliot Rosewater Award
- On the Bulletin's Center for Children's Books 2009 Blue Ribbon List
- 2012 California Young Reader Medal

== Reception ==
Sue Ellen Beauregard, author of "Top 10 first novels for youth on audio" of the Audiobook review, said that it had "[m]any layered fantasy adventures." School Library Journal stated that the characters are "compelling and eminently likeable" and called Cashore's style "exemplary". Kirkus Reviews called Katsa an "ideal adolescent heroine" and said that the story is "Grace-full, in every sense." A New York Times review praised Graceling's "rich fantasy world" and deemed it a story of teens' growing into their talents.

It was announced on April 25, 2013, that the film rights had been acquired by Warner Bros. and would be produced by Reliance Entertainment.

== Graphic novel ==
A graphic novel adaptation of the book was published on November 16, 2021, being both adapted and illustrated by Gareth Hinds.

== Publication history ==
- 2008, USA, Harcourt ISBN 978-0-15-206396-2, Pub date 1 October 2008, Hardback
