= Fire (Cashore novel) =

2009 second book of the Graceling Realm fantasy series by Kristin Cashore

- First US edition
- Author: Kristin Cashore
- Cover artist: Kelly Eismann
- Language: English
- Series: Graceling Realm
- Genre: Fantasy
- Publisher: Gollancz Books (UK); Dial Press (US)
- Publication date: September 24, 2009 (UK); October 5, 2009 (US)
- Publication place: United States
- Media type: Print (hardback & paperback)
- Pages: 480 (first edition, hardcover)
- ISBN: 0-575-08511-8 (first edition, hardcover)
- Preceded by: Graceling
- Followed by: Bitterblue

Fire is a fantasy novel by Kristin Cashore, a companion book to her debut novel, Graceling. It tells the story of a young monster in the shape of a human who is hated because of her difference and supernatural abilities. The novel debuted at number four on The New York Times Best Seller list and won several awards.

== Plot ==
In the land of the Dells, there are "monsters." Impossibly beautiful animals of unnatural colors, that can entrance people with their appearance and control them with their minds. Lady Fire is the last human monster in existence. Her father, Lord Cansrel, used his powers to manipulate the former king, Nax, and throw the Dells into a chaotic, lawless state. With both Nax and Cansrel now dead, the new king Nash and his brother Brigan hope to return the Dells to order and stop a civil war.

As she is passing through the woods one day, a poacher shoots Fire. She is startled by how confusing and empty his mind is, and uses her powers to make him take her back home. Fire's friend and lover, Archer, locks him up, planning to have Fire use her powers for an interrogation once she has had some time to heal, but the next morning they find that the poacher has been shot dead by an arrow at long-range.

Fire and Archer go to Queen Roen's castle to request more guards for their estate and see if they can find information about the mysterious strangers that keep appearing in their woods. While there, Fire meets Nash and Brigan for the first time. Nash is blinded by her monster beauty and instantly falls in love with her, while Brigan distrusts her, believing she is another Cansrel. As the king, prince, and their soldiers are going to defend a village that is being raided, a group of monster raptors attacks them. Fire risks her life by distracting the birds, as they desire her monster flesh more than that of normal humans. She is praised as a hero for her courage, and many of the soldiers consider themselves in her debt.

When she returns home, Brigan calls upon her, saying Nash has requested she come to the capital and use her powers to interrogate prisoners for useful information. While on the journey, Fire has to be guarded constantly by an elite group of soldiers, as many men are driven into a rage by her beauty and try to attack her. She realizes she and Brigan have a lot in common and the two come to an odd understanding.

At King's City, Fire meets Clara and Garan, Nax's illegitimate twins and the royal spymasters, who convince her to use her powers for the good of the kingdom. She agrees, on the condition she will not force information out of anyone, merely persuade them to give it freely. Nash still struggles to control his lust towards her and asks her to marry him on a daily basis. Fire is also shocked to learn that Brigan has a young daughter, Hanna.

Archer arrives at the capital and becomes jealous of Brigan, forcing Fire to break off their arrangement for the sake of their friendship. Archer begins sleeping with women all over the palace, resulting in Clara and Mila, one of Fire's guards, falling pregnant. Fire realizes that she is jealous of her friends having children, but has already decided the world is too dangerous for human monsters to live in and human monsters are too dangerous for the world. Afraid she might change her mind, she takes a herb Clara told her about that will make her infertile.

The strange men with empty minds continue to appear around Fire. One day she notices a boy with mismatched eyes (one grey, the other red) torturing a mouse for fun. When she tells him to stop, he insists he is not hurting it, expecting her to be fooled by his words. He is delighted when she is not. Fire realizes the minds of the people he speaks to have the same empty feeling as the men who came onto her land, but by this time the boy is already gone.

The royals have a plan to assassinate their enemies at the upcoming winter gala, using Fire and her powers to make sure it goes off without a hitch. Archer is against the idea, and in his anger blurts out Fire's biggest secret: she killed Cansrel. Realizing he needed to be stopped, she used her mind powers to lure him down to where he kept his monster pets, made him open the cage, and watched as he was ripped to shreds. Cansrel had become so unstable by that point that people had no trouble believing it was suicide.

Archer confesses he needs to escape and time to think, so he goes in search of a young boy that has bothered Fire immensely. With his red eye, casual cruelty, and a voice that hurts her but entrances everyone else, she links him to the strange and thoughtless men that have been bothering her and the royal family with increased frequency. No one gives her much heed except Archer, who sees it as his responsibility after he wronged Fire. He leaves with her forgiveness and love.

Soon after the gala arrives, with Fire's help two leaders of the rebels are killed and much information is found, primarily about a joint attack set by both rebel groups on King's City. Brigan had enough time to arrange his forces in response, and in the mayhem of the gala Fire is kidnapped. She is captured, drugged, and continuously shot on the mysterious boy's orders, who is revealed at one point to be a young Leck, the main antagonist in "Graceling". He confides that he wants to rule the Dells with Fire as his partner and equal. She refuses and escapes, only to find Archer's body. In rage she burns down Leck's estate, killing his mind slaves in the process. She runs off and finds a horse who rides with her for a while. Leck finds her and tells her of a land across the mountains that hold many people like him, his home country which is the stage for "Graceling". Fire's horse kicks him in the eye; Leck, clutching his eye in pain, and falls into a crack in the mountain, and Fire prays he is finally dead.

She wanders aimlessly afterward, caring little for her own life, and is saved by a horse, then rescued by villagers. She falls unconscious and reawakens among friends. Her hands are frostbitten and she has lost two fingers, and she despairs because she believes she will never play the fiddle again. She is transported back to King's City, and she learns the name of the man who killed Archer, a criminal named Jod. She learns that he was indeed Archer's sire, having raped Brocker's wife on orders from King Nax.

Fire arrives at a Fort Flood, which is under attack, and meets Brigan. The two confess they are in love with each other, but Fire refuses to give into her feelings because she does not want to love him if he is "only going to die." He leaves for battle once more, and Fire is wracked with agony and worry for his safety.

After living in relative seclusion while trying to process Archer's death and the loss of her fingers, Fire is brought to life again, thanks to Garan. He convinces her to begin working in the hospitals relieving people of their pain and helping doctors with minor tasks. She comes to meet Nash, who she also wants to disconnect from because of his status as a soldier. He informs her that she is being silly, because death will come to all for many different reasons, not just war. She and Nash talk, coming to terms with the love they feel, even for their fathers.

Fire meets Roen and Brocker, who confide in her that Brigan is not really Nax's son but Brocker's, as he and Roen having an affair that led to his banishment and the abuse he suffered on Nax's account. Fire, after fighting with this, comes to accept it.

She meets Brigan at Fort Flood and the two reconcile, making love and coming to terms with all that they have lost and gained. Soon after, the rebels request a meeting under the pretense of peace. During they ask for Fire to be given to them, and after the demand is refused, Nash is shot. He lives, and Brigan's army conquers, returning the Dells to relative peace.

Fire returns to King's City hailed as a hero, much to her embarrassment. A ceremony to mourn Archer is held at Brocker's estate, and many return there to grieve his passing including Clara and Mila with their newborn babies, Aran and Liv, respectively. Mila tells Fire she has begun a relationship with Nash, and Fire is pleased, though she is uncommonly happy due to Archer's two babies. At Archer's ceremony she mourns both him and her father, whom she misses, but she also forgives herself for his murder. She plays a song on her fiddle that she has fought so hard to once again play. With one tune she lets out her sadness for those she cares about, dead and living.

== Characters ==
- Lady Fire: Fire is the last human monster. Like all monsters, she is exceptionally beautiful and alluring, to the point where some men are driven wild by the sight of her. She was named after her hair, which shines with copper, pink, gold, orange, and primarily red, making it look like it is on fire. It is her most stunning feature, and as such she usually keeps it hidden under a headscarf to avoid unwanted attention. As a monster, she holds the power to control minds, but fears becoming the tyrant her dead father was, and so she is unwilling to invade the minds of innocent people. She is known for her love of her horse, Small, and for children. She desperately desires children of her own, however, she realizes that human monsters should not exist, and so refrains from having any, eventually taking a herb to make herself infertile so she will never be tempted. She has green eyes and brown skin.
- Prince Brigan: Brother of Nash and commander of the King's army. He is the son of Lord Brocker and Queen Roen. As a child, he was very mischievous and laid traps for his brother Nash. Soldiers would fall head over hilt to die for him because of the love and care he shows them. When they first meet, Brigan hates Fire, but gradually falls in love with her. He has grayish eyes, and a daughter named Hanna, whom he loves dearly.
- Archer: Fire's childhood friend, lover, and devoted companion. His mother, Brocker's wife Aliss, was raped, leading to his conception. Despite this, Brocker regards him as his own son. It is later revealed that this was on King Nax's orders, as punishment for Brocker, who has had an affair with Queen Roen. Archer is known for his incredible skill with all types of bows. He loves Fire, but unintentionally pushes her away with the level jealousy and possessiveness he displays around her, as well as his carelessness, particularly how many women he leads on and abandons. Two such women are Clara and Mila, with whom he fathers children and then leaves. After leaving the capital in search of the archer who keeps targeting Fire, he finds the man, Jod, who is actually his real father, and is killed by him. He is described as tall, fair-haired, and incredibly handsome.
- Brocker: Former army commander in the service of King Nax until it was revealed that he was having an affair with Queen Roen, (Brigan being the result). Nax then had Brocker's legs shattered by multiple blows with a mallet and sent the archer Jod to rape his wife. He acts as Fire's guardian and foster father for most of her life. He is portrayed as wise, compassionate, and sensible. Fire has a strong sense of love and care for him.
- Cansrel: Fire's father, a human monster. He was an advisor to King Nax and is most remembered for his cruelty and insanity, partly caused by unspecified drug abuse. He kept monster predators as pets, starving and tormenting them. Eventually, Fire realized he was too dangerous to be allowed to continue living, and so slowly began to control his mind, until she had enough power to will him to walk into the cage of a monster leopard. He had dark blue eyes and silver hair with blue highlights.
- Nash: King of the Dells, and son of Roen and Nax. At first, like most men, he has difficulty resisting Fire's beauty but eventually, he manages to control himself. Although he does not always use common sense, he is a fair and good king. He is described as dark-haired and good-looking.
- Hanna: She is Brigan's six-year-old daughter, born out of a rushed union between Brigan and Rose, a stable worker. She is a tomboy who often tries to avoid her lessons.
- Clara: Nax's daughter and Garan's twin, vivacious and full of life. She has an affair which Archer, which results in a child but ends the relationship out of regard for Fire.
- Garan: Nax's son and Clara's twin. When he was younger he had suffered a fever but had come out alive but with "ruined health."
- Nax: Previous King of the Dells and the father of Nash, Clara, and Garan. It is mentioned that Nax had the potential to be a good king, but allowed Cansrel to control his mind and actions.
- Queen Roen: The Queen of the Dells and wife of the late Nax. Roen is seen by Fire as intelligent, strong, and caring. She often assumes an almost motherly role for Fire. She has black hair and is short in height.
- Leck (Immiker): A Graceling from Monsea, with the power to control people through words. He was born as "Immiker" and raised by his father after his mother died in childbirth. When one of his eyes turned red, marking him as a Graceling, his father took him and fled, knowing that Gracelings are considered the property of the crown and his son would be taken from him. While looking for somewhere secluded to live, they fell down a dangerous cavern and came out weeks later, at the Dells. Immiker changed his name to Leck, after the way the Dellians pronounced his father's name. He is a power-hungry sadist and wants Fire to join him, believing them to be similar.

== Awards ==
Fire is an ALA Best Books for Young Adults (2010) and a Cybils Awards winner (in the young adult fantasy/scifi category). It was also awarded:

- Publishers Weekly Best Children's Books of 2009
- The Washington Post Best Kid's Book of The Year
- Seattle Times Best YA Book of 2009
- School Library Journal Best Books of 2009

== Publication history ==
- 2009, UK, Gollancz ISBN 0-575-08511-8, Pub date 5 October 2009, Hardback
