= A Reaper at the Gates =

2018 novel by Sabaa Tahir

- First edition book cover
- Author: Sabaa Tahir
- Language: English
- Series: An Ember in the Ashes series
- Genre: Young adult, romantic fantasy
- Publisher: Razorbill
- Publication date: Jun 12, 2018
- Publication place: United States
- Media type: Print (hardcover), audiobook, e-book
- Pages: 464 (hardcover)
- ISBN: 9780448494500
- OCLC: 1027063757
- LC Class: PZ7.1.T33 Re 2018
- Preceded by: A Torch Against the Night
- Followed by: A Sky Beyond the Storm

A Reaper at the Gates is a young adult fantasy romance novel written by Pakistani-American author Sabaa Tahir. It was published on Jun 12, 2018 by Razorbill, an imprint of Penguin Random House. It is the third book in the An Ember in the Ashes series, preceded by A Torch Against the Night and followed by A Sky Beyond the Storm. The story follows Laia, a Scholar girl, on a mission to defeat the Nightbringer; Elias, the current Soul Catcher, who tries to learn the ways of his new role; and Helene, the Blood Shrike, who tries to defeat the enemies of the Empire. The novel is narrated in the first-person, alternating between the points of view of Laia, Elias and Helene.

== Plot ==
The third book in the Ember Quartet picks up where the second book left off. Laia has now realized that if she wants to save her people, the Scholars, she must defeat the Nightbringer, a vengeful Jinn set on destroying them. But the Jinn is wily and ancient, and it will take all of Laia's smarts and courage to outwit him.

In the forest called The Waiting Place, Elias has been condemned to a life of passing ghosts to the next world. But his connections to the world of the living, especially his feelings for Laia, are jeopardizing his ability to pass the ghosts on. This in turn threatens the very fabric of existence.

Meanwhile, in the capital city of Antium, Helene Aquilla, the Blood Shrike, is hoping she can keep her younger sister Livia safe from the predations of her new husband, Emperor Marcus. To do so, she needs to hatch a clever plot that will lead to the destruction of both the Emperor and The Commandant Keris Veturia, his lieutenant. But Keris grows ever more powerful—and she's set on taking Helene down.

Point of view characters in this book include, Laia of Serra, Elias Veturius, Helene Aquilla, and the Nightbringer.

=== Characters ===
Laia – Laia is a Scholar, a once-great race that was crushed by the Martials. She is trying to thwart the plan of the Nightbringer.

Elias – Elias is the current Soul Catcher. The Soul Catcher passes the souls of the dead from the Waiting Place.

Helene – Helene Aquilla is the Blood Shrike. She executes the will of the emperor.

Commandant – The Commandant, Keris Veturia, is the cruel head of the military academy, Blackcliff, as well as the mother of Elias, and is considered "one of the most powerful people in the Empire."

Marcus Farrar – Emperor Marcus is a sadistic man and former classmate of Helene and Elias. He is married to Helene's younger sister, Livia.

Nightbringer – The old king of the jinn.

Avitas Harper – The second of the Blood Shrike and half brother of Elias. He has romantic interest towards Helene.

Musa – The Beekeeper. He has the magical ability to control lesser fey creatures. He is also the prince consort of princess Nikla of Marinn.
