= Kristin Cashore =

American young adult and fantasy writer

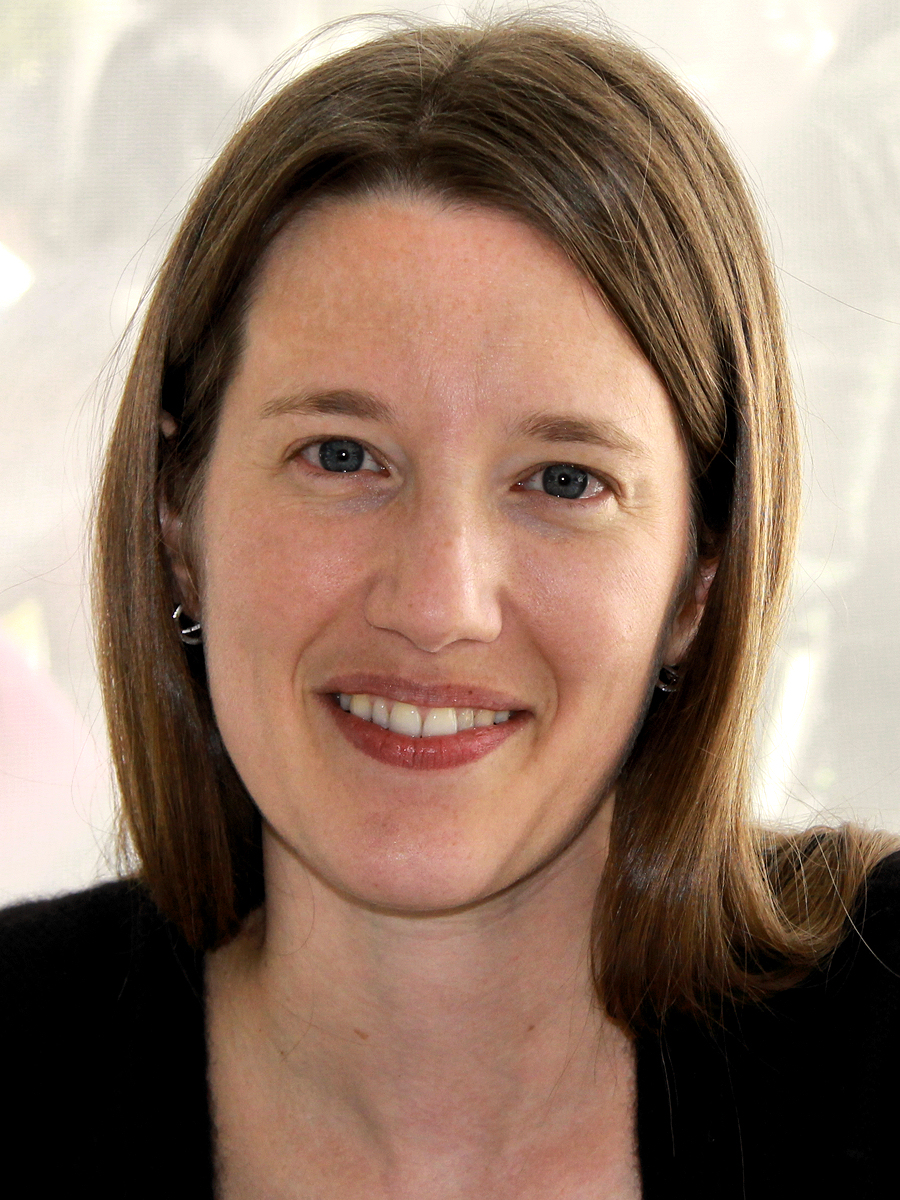
- Cashore at the Texas Book Festival in 2012
- Born: 1976 (age 49–50)
- Occupation: Author
- Writing career
- Genres: Young adult, fantasy
- Notable work: Graceling
- Website: kristincashore.com

Kristin Cashore (born 1976) is an American young adult and fantasy writer, best known for the Graceling Realm series.

== Early life ==
Cashore grew up in the Pennsylvania countryside, the second of four daughters. She has a bachelor's degree from Williams College. She received her master's degree in Children's Literature from the Center for the Study of Children's Literature at Simmons College in 2003. She has worked as a dog runner, a packer in a candy factory, an editorial assistant, a legal assistant, and a freelance writer. She writes her novels by hand.

== Literary career ==
Her debut novel, Graceling, was published in October 2008. The book was nominated for the Andre Norton and William C. Morris awards and earned a place on the Publishers Weekly Best Books of the Year for 2008. Her second book, Fire, was released in October 2009, and is described as being a 'prequel-ish companion book' to Graceling. Fire received the Amelia Elizabeth Walden Book Award.

Bitterblue, the third book of the Graceling Realm series, was released in May 2012. As of 2017, the Graceling Realm series had sold more than 1.5 million copies and been translated into 33 languages.

Cashore's fourth book, Jane, Unlimited, was released in September 2017. Jane, Unlimited is her first published novel that takes a step away from the Graceling Realm, and is told in multiple genres.

Cashore returned to the Graceling Realm series with Winterkeep, which was released in January 2021. Seasparrow, released in November 2022, was the fifth book in the series.

Cashore has also written professionally for textbooks, and teacher editions, as well as for The Horn Book Guide.

Her latest book, There Is a Door in this Darkness, was released on June 11, 2024.

== Publications ==
=== Graceling Realm series ===
#	Title	Published
1	Graceling	1 October 2008
2	Fire	5 October 2009
3	Bitterblue	1 May 2012
4	Winterkeep	19 January 2021
5	Seasparrow	1 November 2022

=== Standalone novels ===
- Jane, Unlimited (September 19, 2017)
- There Is a Door in This Darkness (June 11, 2024)

=== Graphic novels ===
- Graceling: Graphic Novel (November 16, 2021)
