= Best Fiction for Young Adults =

Annual book recommendation list

The American Library Association's (ALA) Best Fiction for Young Adults, previously known as Best Books for Young Adults (1966–2010), is a recommended list of books presented yearly by the Young Adult Library Services Association (YALSA) division. It is for "fiction titles published for young adults in the past 16 months that are recommended reading for ages 12 to 18. The purpose of the annual list is to provide librarians and library workers with a resource to use for collection development and readers advisory purposes." In addition there is a "Best of the Best" list of the top 10 titles, made available since 1997.

The list has been published since 1930 when it was founded as "Best Books for Young People". It has undergone several changes of focus and names over the years, including the "Book Selection Committee" (1954), the "Committee for the Selection of Significant Adult Books for Young People" (1963). It became the "Best Books for Young Adults Committee" (BBYA) in 1966 and then "Best Fiction for Young Adults" in 2010.

Before 1973, only "adult books" (as marketed) were eligible. Books marketed for "young adults" have been considered since then and now constitute a majority of the selections. Meanwhile, the marketing category has changed to include more books oriented to older teens.

== Honorees ==
A list of historical recipients is available in Betty Carter, Best Books for Young Adults, 1st Edition (1994). Later editions of this work (2000 and 2007) contain additional information.

American Library Association's Top Ten Best Books
| Year | Author(s) | Book Title | Publisher |
|---|---|---|---|
| 1997 | Nancy Farmer | A Girl Named Disaster | Orchard Books |
| 1997 | Will Hobbs | Far North | HarperCollins |
| 1997 | Binjamin Wilkomirski | Fragments: Memories of a Wartime Childhood | Schocken |
| 1997 | Philip Pullman | The Golden Compass / Northern Lights | Scholastic Point |
| 1997 | John Gilstrap | Nathan's Run | Pinnacle Books |
| 1997 | Walter Dean Myers | One More River to Cross: An African American Photograph Album | Harcourt Brace |
| 1997 | Rob Thomas | Rats Saw God | Simon & Schuster Books for Young Readers |
| 1997 | Joshua Blum, Bob Holman and Mark Pellington | The United States of Poetry | Harry N. Abrams |
| 1997 | Mel Glenn | Who Killed Mr. Chippendale? A Mystery in Poems | Lodestar Books |
| 1997 | Rich Wallace | Wrestling Sturbridge | Random House Children's Books |
| 1998 | Annette Curtis Klause | Blood and Chocolate | Random House |
| 1998 | Edward Bloor | Tangerine | Harcourt |
| 1998 | Jon Krakauer | Into Thin Air | Villard Books |
| 1998 | Joyce McDonald | Swallowing Stones | Ember |
| 1998 | Karen Hesse | Out of the Dust | Scholastic Incorporated |
| 1998 | Marjorie Reynolds | Starlite Drive-In | Penguin Group |
| 1998 | Robert Cormier | Tenderness | Random House Children's Books |
| 1998 | Sara Tuvel Bernstein | Seamstress | Berkley Books |
| 1998 | Susan Campbell Bartoletti | Growing Up in Coal Country | Houghton Mifflin Company |
| 1998 | Walter Dean Myers | Harlem | Scholastic Press |
| 1999 | Margaret Peterson Haddix | Among the Hidden | Simon and Schuster |
| 1999 | Penny Colman | Corpses, Coffins, and Crypts | Holt |
| 1999 | J. K. Rowling | Harry Potter and the Sorcerer's Stone (Harry Potter, Book One) | Scholastic Press |
| 1999 | Louis Sachar | Holes | Farrar, Straus, and Giroux |
| 1999 | Jacqueline Woodson | If You Come Softly | Putnam |
| 1999 | Jean Ferris | Love Among the Walnuts | Harcourt Brace |
| 1999 | Kimberly Willis Holt | My Louisiana Sky | Holt Publishing |
| 1999 | Anita Lobel | No Pretty Pictures: a Child of War | Greenwillow |
| 1999 | Ben Mikaelsen | Petey | Hyperion |
| 1999 | Joan Bauer | Rules of the Road | Putnam |
| 2000 | Laurie Halse Anderson | Speak | Farrar, Straus, and Giroux |
| 2000 | Orson Scott Card | Ender's Shadow | Tor |
| 2000 | Kimberly Willis Holt | When Zachary Beaver came to Town | Henry Holt & Co |
| 2000 | Sherryl Jordan | The Raging Quiet | Simon and Schuster |
| 2000 | Laura and Tom McNeal | Crooked | Alfred A. Knopf |
| 2000 | Carolyn Meyer | Mary, Bloody Mary | Harcourt Brace |
| 2000 | Walter Dean Myers | Monster | HarperCollins |
| 2000 | Lensey Namioka | Ties that Bind, Ties that Break | Delacorte Press |
| 2000 | Connie Porter | Imani All Mine | Houghton Mifflin |
| 2000 | Irene Gut Opdyke | In My Hands: Memories of a Holocaust Rescuer | Alfred A. Knopf |
| 2001 | Adam Bagdasarian | Forgotten Fire | DK |
| 2001 | Joan Bauer | Hope was Here | G. P. Putnam's Sons |
| 2001 | Tracy Chevalier | Girl with a Pearl Earring | E. P. Dutton |
| 2001 | Jon Katz | Geeks: How Two Boys Rode the Internet Out of Idaho | Villard |
| 2001 | E. L. Konigsburg | Silent to the Bone | Jean Karl Book/Atheneum Books |
| 2001 | Gary Paulsen | The Beet Fields | Delacorte Press |
| 2001 | Pam Munoz Ryan | Esperanza Rising | Scholastic Press |
| 2001 | Jerry Spinelli | Stargirl | Alfred A. Knopf |
| 2001 | Gloria Whelan | Homeless Bird | HarperCollins |
| 2001 | Ruth White | Memories of Summer | Farrar, Straus, and Giroux |
| 2002 | Ann Brashares | The Sisterhood of the Traveling Pants | Delacorte |
| 2002 | Robert Cormier | The Rag and Bone Shop | Delacorte |
| 2002 | Chris Crutcher | Whale Talk | HarperCollins |
| 2002 | Alex Flinn | Breathing Underwater | HarperCollins |
| 2002 | A. M. Jenkins | Damage | HarperCollins |
| 2002 | Richard Mosher | Zazoo | Houghton Mifflin |
| 2002 | Garth Nix | Lirael | HarperCollins |
| 2002 | Mildred D. Taylor | The Land | Penguin Putnam |
| 2002 | Rita Williams-Garcia | Every Time a Rainbow Dies | William Morrow |
| 2002 | Virginia Euwer Wolff | True Believer | Atheneum |
| 2003 | Iain Lawrence | The Lightkeeper's Daughter | Random House/Delacorte Press |
| 2003 | E. R. Frank | America | Simon & Schuster/Atheneum/A Richard Jackson Book |
| 2003 | Laurie Halse Anderson | Catalyst | Penguin Putnam/Viking Press |
| 2003 | Nancy Farmer | The House of the Scorpion | Simon & Schuster/Atheneum/A Richard Jackson Book |
| 2003 | Naomi Shihab Nye | 19 Varieties of Gazelle: Poems of the Middle East | HarperCollins/Greenwillow |
| 2003 | Elizabeth Partridge | This Land Was Made For You and Me: The Life & Songs of Woody Guthrie | Penguin Putnam/Viking |
| 2003 | Gordon Korman | Son of the Mob | Hyperion Books for Children |
| 2003 | Peter Nelson | Left for Dead: A Young Man's Search for Justice for the USS Indianapolis | Random House/Delacorte Press |
| 2003 | M. T. Anderson | Feed | Candlewick Press |
| 2003 | Christopher Moore | Lamb: The Gospel According to Biff, Christ's Childhood Pal | HarperCollins/William Morrow & Co. |
| 2004 | Martha Brooks | True Confessions of a Heartless Girl | Farrar, Straus and Giroux/Melanie Kroupa Books |
| 2004 | Jennifer Donnelly | A Northern Light | Harcourt |
| 2004 | Mark Haddon | The Curious Incident of the Dog in the Night-Time: A Novel | Random House/Doubleday |
| 2004 | Angela Johnson | The First Part Last | Simon & Schuster Books for Young Readers |
| 2004 | David Levithan | Boy Meets Boy | Random House/Alfred A. Knopf |
| 2004 | Joyce Maynard | The Usual Rules | St. Martin's Press |
| 2004 | Edith Pattou | East | Harcourt Children's Books |
| 2004 | Adam Rapp | 33 Snowfish | Candlewick Press |
| 2004 | Jonathan Stroud | The Amulet of Samarkand (Bartimaeus Trilogy, Book One) | Hyperion Books for Children/Miramax |
| 2004 | Craig Thompson | Blankets: An Illustrated Novel | Top Shelf Productions |
| 2005 | Joshua Braff | The Unthinkable Thoughts of Jacob Green | Workman Publishing Co. / Algonquin Books of Chapel Hill |
| 2005 | Christopher Paul Curtis | Bucking the Sarge | Random House/Wendy Lamb |
| 2005 | Phillip Hoose | The Race to Save the Lord God Bird | Farrar, Straus and Giroux/Melanie Kroupa Books |
| 2005 | David Levithan | The Realm of Possibility | Random House Children's Books/Alfred A. Knopf |
| 2005 | Melina Marchetta | Saving Francesca | Random House Children's Books/Alfred A. Knopf |
| 2005 | Michael Morpurgo | Private Peaceful | Scholastic |
| 2005 | Kenneth Oppel | Airborn | HarperCollins Children's Book Group/Eos Press |
| 2005 | Adam Rapp | Under the Wolf, Under the Dog | Candlewick Press |
| 2005 | Benjamin Alire Saenz | Sammy and Juliana in Hollywood | Cinco Puntos Press |
| 2005 | Sarah Weeks | So B. It: a novel | HarperCollins Children's Books/ Laura Geringer Books |
| 2006 | Said Hyder Akbar and Susan Burton | Come Back to Afghanistan: A California Teenager's Story | Bloomsbury Publishing |
| 2006 | Susan Campbell Bartoletti | Hitler Youth: Growing Up in Hitler's Shadow | Scholastic |
| 2006 | Kalisha Buckhanon | Upstate | St. Martin's Press |
| 2006 | John Green | Looking for Alaska | E. P. Dutton |
| 2006 | Chris Lynch | Inexcusable | Simon & Schuster/Atheneum Books |
| 2006 | Stephenie Meyer | Twilight: A Novel (Twilight, Book One) | Little, Brown & Co./Megan Tingley |
| 2006 | Brian K. Vaughan with Adrian Alphona (Illus.) | Runaways: Volume 1 HC | Marvel Press |
| 2006 | Scott Westerfeld | Peeps | Penguin Books/Razorbill |
| 2006 | Chris Wooding | Poison | Scholastic/Orchard |
| 2006 | Markus Zusak | I am the Messenger | Alfred A. Knopf |
| 2007 | M. T. Anderson | The Astonishing Life of Octavian Nothing, Traitor to the Nation, Volume 1: The Pox Party | Candlewick Press |
| 2007 | Alan Gratz | Samurai Shortstop | Penguin Group/Dial Press |
| 2007 | Sonya Hartnett | Surrender | Candlewick Press |
| 2007 | Patricia McCormick | Sold | Hyperion |
| 2007 | Meghan Nuttall Sayres | Anahita's Woven Riddle | Abrams Books/Amulet Books |
| 2007 | John Smelcer | The Trap | Henry Holt & Co |
| 2007 | Megan Whalen Turner | The King of Attolia | HarperCollins/Greenwillow |
| 2007 | Nancy Werlin | The Rules of Survival | Penguin Group/Dial Press |
| 2007 | Gene Luen Yang and Lark Pien | American Born Chinese | Roaring Brook Press/First Second Books |
| 2007 | Markus Zusak | The Book Thief | Random House/Alfred A. Knopf |
| 2008 | Sherman Alexie with Ellen Forney (Illus.) | The Absolutely True Diary of a Part-time Indian | Little, Brown & Co. |
| 2008 | Ishmael Beah | A Long Way Gone: Memoirs of a Boy Soldier | Farrar, Straus and Giroux/Sarah Crichton |
| 2008 | Jenny Downham | Before I Die | Random House/David Fickling |
| 2008 | Stephanie Hemphill | Your Own, Sylvia: A Verse Portrait of Sylvia Plath | Random House/Alfred A. Knopf |
| 2008 | Lloyd Jones | Mister Pip | Dell Publishing/Dial Press |
| 2008 | Derek Landy | Skulduggery Pleasant: The Sceptor of the Ancients (Skulduggery Pleasant, Book One) | HarperCollins |
| 2008 | Mal Peet | Tamar: A Novel of Espionage, Passion, and Betrayal | Candlewick Press |
| 2008 | Matthew Polly | American Shaolin: Flying Kicks, Buddhist Monks, and the Legend of Iron Crotch: An Odyssey in the New China | Penguin Group USA/Gotham Books |
| 2008 | Brian Selznick | The Invention of Hugo Cabret: A Novel | Scholastic |
| 2008 | Shaun Tan | The Arrival | Scholastic/Arthur A. Levine |
| 2009 | Robin Bowman | It's Complicated: The American Teenager | Umbrage Editions |
| 2009 | Suzanne Collins | The Hunger Games | Scholastic |
| 2009 | Leslie Conner | Waiting for Normal | HarperCollins/HarperTeen |
| 2009 | Matt de la Pena | Mexican WhiteBoy | Delacorte Press |
| 2009 | Siobhan Dowd | Bog Child | Random House/David Fickling Books |
| 2009 | Christine Fletcher | Ten Cents a Dance | Bloomsbury |
| 2009 | Joseph Monninger | Baby | Boyd Mills Press/Front Street |
| 2009 | Terry Pratchett | Nation | HarperCollins |
| 2009 | Mariko Tamaki and Jillian Tamaki | Skim | House of Anansi Press / Groundwood Books |
| 2009 | Coert Voorhees | The Brothers Torres | Disney/Hyperion |
| 2010 | Sarah Rees Brennan | Demon's Lexicon (The Demon's Lexicon, Book One) | Simon & Schuster Children's Publishing/Margaret K. McElderry |
| 2010 | Paul Griffin | The Orange Houses | Penguin/Dial Books |
| 2010 | M. H. Herlong | The Great Wide Sea | Penguin/Viking |
| 2010 | Catherine Jinks | The Reformed Vampire Support Group | Harcourt/ Houghton Mifflin Harcourt |
| 2010 | Donna Jo Napoli | Alligator Bayou | Random House / Alfred A. Knopf |
| 2010 | David Small | Stitches: A Memoir | W. W. Norton & Co |
| 2010 | Rebecca Stead | When You Reach Me | Random House/Wendy Lamb |
| 2010 | Francisco X. Stork | Marcelo in the Real World | Scholastic/Arthur A. Levine Books |
| 2010 | Laini Taylor | Lips Touch: Three Times | Scholastic/Arthur A. Levine Books |
| 2010 | Sally M. Walker | Written in Bone: Buried Lives of Jamestown and Colonial Maryland | Lerner/Carolrhoda Books |
| 2011 | Paolo Bacigalupi | Ship Breaker | Little, Brown & Co |
| 2011 | Jennifer Donnelly | Revolution | Random House/Delacorte Press |
| 2011 | Melina Marchetta | Finnikin of the Rock | Candlewick Press |
| 2011 | Morgan Matson | Amy & Roger's Epic Detour | Simon & Schuster |
| 2011 | Lish McBride | Hold Me Closer, Necromancer | Macmillan Children's Book Group/Henry Holt & Co. |
| 2011 | Andy Mulligan | Trash | Random House/David Fickling Books |
| 2011 | Mitali Perkins | Bamboo People | Charlesbridge |
| 2011 | Dana Reinhardt | The Things a Brother Knows | Random House/Wendy Lamb |
| 2011 | Benjamin Alire Sáenz | Last Night I Sang to the Monster | Cinco Puntos Press |
| 2011 | Marcus Sedgwick | Revolver | MacMillian Publishers/Roaring Brook Press |
| 2012 | Rae Carson | The Girl of Fire and Thorns | HarperTeen |
| 2012 | Joshua C. Cohen | Leverage | Penguin Group/E. P. Dutton |
| 2012 | A. S. King | Everybody Sees the Ants | Little, Brown Books for Young Readers |
| 2012 | Guadalupe Garcia McCall | Under the Mesquite | Lee & Low Books |
| 2012 | Lauren Myracle | Shine | Abrams Books/Amulet Books |
| 2012 | Patrick Ness with Jim Kay (Illus) | A Monster Calls | Candlewick Press |
| 2012 | Ruta Sepetys | Between Shades of Gray | Penguin Group/Philomel Books |
| 2012 | Maggie Stiefvater | The Scorpio Races | Scholastic |
| 2012 | Laini Taylor | Daughter of Smoke and Bone (Daughter of Smoke and Bone, Book One) | Little, Brown Books for Young Readers |
| 2012 | Sara Zarr | How to Save a Life | Little, Brown Books for Young Readers |
| 2013 | Jesse Andrews | Me and Earl and the Dying Girl | Abrams Books/Amulet Books |
| 2013 | Libba Bray | The Diviners | Little, Brown Books for Young Readers |
| 2013 | Rachel Hartman | Seraphina | Random House Books for Young Readers |
| 2013 | Alethea Kontis | Enchanted | Houghton Mifflin Harcourt/Harcourt Children's Books |
| 2013 | David Levithan | Every Day | Random House/Knopf Books for Young Readers |
| 2013 | Patricia McCormick | Never Fall Down | HarperCollins/Balzer + Bray |
| 2013 | Matthew Quick | Boy 21 | Little, Brown Books for Young Readers |
| 2013 | Benjamin Alire Sáenz | Aristotle and Dante Discover the Secrets of the Universe | Simon & Schuster Books for Young Readers |
| 2013 | Maggie Stiefvater | The Raven Boys | Scholastic |
| 2013 | Elizabeth Wein | Code Name Verity | Disney/Hyperion |
| 2014 | Julie Berry | All the Truth That's in Me | Penguin Putnam/Viking |
| 2014 | Kristin Elizabeth Clark | Freakboy | Macmillan Publishers/Farrar, Straus, and Giroux |
| 2014 | Tim Federle | Better Nate Than Ever | Simon & Schuster Books for Young Readers |
| 2014 | Tom McNeal | Far Far Away | Random House/Knopf Books for Young Readers |
| 2014 | Rainbow Rowell | Eleanor & Park | Macmillan Publishers/St. Martin's Press |
| 2014 | Marcus Sedgwick | Midwinterblood | Macmillan Publishers/Roaring Brook Press |
| 2014 | Ruta Sepetys | Out of the Easy | Penguin Books/Philomel Books |
| 2014 | Andrew A. Smith with Sam Bosma (Illus.) | Winger | Simon & Schuster |
| 2014 | Tara Sullivan | Golden Boy | Penguin Books/ G. P. Putnam's sons Juvenile |
| 2014 | Elizabeth Wein | Rose Under Fire | Disney/Hyperion |
| 2015 | Jandy Nelson | I'll Give You the Sun | Dial Press |
| 2015 | William Ritter | Jackaby | Algonquin |
| 2015 | John Corey Whaley | Noggin | Atheneum Books |
| 2015 | Jessie Ann Foley | The Carnival at Bray | Elephant Rock Books |
| 2015 | Kwame Alexander | The Crossover | Houghton Mifflin Harcourt |
| 2015 | Brendan Kiely | The Gospel of Winter | Simon & Schuster/Margaret K. McElderry |
| 2015 | E. K. Johnston | The Story of Owen: Dragon Slayer of Trondheim | Carolrhoda/Lab |
| 2015 | Marie Lu | The Young Elites | G. P. Putnam's sons |
| 2015 | Timothee de Fombelle | Vango | Candlewick Press |
| 2015 | E. Lockhart | We Were Liars | Delacorte Publishing |
| 2016 | Becky Albertalli | Simon vs. the Homo Sapiens Agenda | HarperCollins/Balzer + Bray |
| 2016 | Leigh Bardugo | Six of Crows | Holt |
| 2016 | Kevin Brooks | The Bunker Diary | Lerner Publishing Group/Carolrhoda Lab |
| 2016 | Melanie Crowder | Audacity | Philomel Books |
| 2016 | Daniel José Older | Shadowshaper | Scholastic/Arthur A. Levine Books |
| 2016 | Jason Reynolds | The Boy in the Black Suit | Atheneum Books |
| 2016 | Laura Ruby | Bone Gap | HarperCollins/Balzer + Bray |
| 2016 | Ilyasah Shabazz and Kekla Magoon | X: A Novel | Candlewick Press |
| 2016 | Neal Shusterman | Challenger Deep | HarperTeen |
| 2016 | Adam Silvera | More Happy than Not | Soho Teen |
| 2017 | Julie Berry | The Passion of Dolssa | Viking Books for Young Readers |
| 2017 | Traci Chee | The Reader | G. P. Putnam's Sons / Putnam's Sons Books for Young Readers |
| 2017 | Frances Hardinge | The Lie Tree | Abrams Books |
| 2017 | Mindy McGinnis | The Female of the Species | HarperCollins/Katherine Tegen Books |
| 2017 | Meg Medina | Burn Baby Burn | Candlewick Press |
| 2017 | Jason Reynolds | Ghost | Atheneum Books/Caitlyn Dlouhy Books |
| 2017 | Ruta Sepetys | Salt to the Sea | Philomel Books |
| 2017 | Neal Shusterman | Scythe | Simon & Schuster Books for Young Readers |
| 2017 | Nicola Yoon | The Sun is Also a Star | Delacorte Press |
| 2017 | Jeff Zentner | The Serpent King | Crown Books for Young Readers |
| 2018 | Elana Arnold | What Girls Are Made Of | Lerner Publishing Group/Carolrhoda Lab |
| 2018 | Leigh Bardugo with Sara Kipin (Illus.) | The Language of Thorns: Midnight Tales and Dangerous Magic | Macmillan Publishers |
| 2018 | Mackenzi Lee | The Gentleman's Guide to Vice and Virtue | HarperCollins/Katherine Tegen |
| 2018 | Sarah Moon | Sparrow | Scholastic/Arthur A. Levine |
| 2018 | Jason Reynolds | Long Way Down | Simon & Schuster/Atheneum Books |
| 2018 | Laini Taylor | Strange the Dreamer | Little, Brown & Co |
| 2018 | Angie Thomas | The Hate U Give | HarperCollins/Balzer + Bray |
| 2018 | Renee Watson | Piecing Me Together | Bloomsbury USA |
| 2018 | Francesca Zappia | Eliza and Her Monsters | HarperCollins/Greenwillow |
| 2018 | Jeff Zentner | Goodbye Days | Crown Books for Young Readers |
| 2019 | Elizabeth Acevedo | The Poet X | HarperTeen |
| 2019 | Becky Albertalli and Adam Silvera | What if It's Us | HarperTeen |
| 2019 | Holly Black | The Cruel Prince (The Folk of the Air, Book One) | Little, Brown & Co. |
| 2019 | Deb Caletti | A Heart in a Body in the World | Simon Pulse |
| 2019 | Justina Ireland | Dread Nation | HarperCollins/Balzer + Bray |
| 2019 | Tiffany D. Jackson | Monday's Not Coming | HarperCollins/Katherine Tegen Books |
| 2019 | Adib Khorram | Darius the Great is Not Okay | Dial Press |
| 2019 | Emma Mills | Foolish Hearts | Henry Holt & Co |
| 2019 | Preston Norton | Neanderthal Opens the Door to the Universe | Disney Hyperion |
| 2019 | Shivaun Plozza | Frankie | Flatiron Books |
| 2020 | Ben Philippe | The Field Guide to the North American Teenager | HarperCollins/Balzer+Bray |
| 2020 | Sharon Biggs Waller | Girls on the Verge | Holt |
| 2020 | Mindy McGinnis | Heroine | HarperCollins/Katherine Tegen Books |
| 2020 | Abdi Nazemian | Like a Love Story | HarperCollins/Balzer+Bray |
| 2020 | Julie Berry | Lovely War | Viking Press |
| 2020 | Angie Thomas | On the Come Up | HarperCollins/Balzer+Bray |
| 2020 | Randy Ribay | Patron Saints of Nothing | Penguin/Kokila |
| 2020 | Akwaeke Emezi | Pet | Random House/Make Me a World |
| 2020 | Junauda Petrus | The Stars and the Blackness between Them | E. P. Dutton |
| 2020 | Elizabeth Acevedo | With the Fire on High | HarperTeen |
| 2021 | Mindy McGinnis | Be Not Far from Me | HarperCollins/Katherine Tegen Books |
| 2021 | Aiden Thomas | Cemetery Boys | Macmillan/Swoon Reads |
| 2021 | Elizabeth Acevedo | Clap When You Land | HarperCollins/HarperTeen |
| 2021 | Frances Hardinge | Deeplight | Abrams Books/Amulet Books |
| 2021 | Tiffany D. Jackson | Grown | HarperCollins/Katherine Tegen Books |
| 2021 | Syed M. Masood | More Than Just a Pretty Face | Hachette/Little, Brown Books for Young Readers |
| 2021 | Jordan Ifueko | Raybearer | Abrams Books/Amulet Books |
| 2021 | Kim Johnson | This Is My America | Random House Books for Young Readers |
| 2021 | Jenny Torres Sanchez | We Are Not from Here | Penguin Random House/Philomel Books |
| 2021 | Jennifer Longo | What I Carry | Random House Books for Young Readers |
| 2022 | Dhonielle Clayton, Tiffany D. Jackson, Nic Stone, Angie Thomas, Ashley Woodfolk, and Nicola Yoon | Blackout | HarperCollins/Quill Tree Books |
| 2022 | Aden Polydoros | The City Beautiful | Harlequin/Inkyard Press |
| 2022 | Angie Thomas | Concrete Rose | HarperCollins/Balzer + Bray |
| 2022 | David Arnold | The Electric Kingdom | Penguin Random House/Viking Books for Young Readers |
| 2022 | Angeline Boulley | Firekeeper's Daughter | Macmillan/Henry Holt & Co. Books for Young Readers |
| 2022 | Raquel Vasquez Gilliland | How Moon Fuentez Fell in Love with the Universe | Simon & Schuster Books for Young Readers |
| 2022 | Jeff Zentner | In the Wild Light | Penguin Random House/Crown Books for Young Readers |
| 2022 | Malinda Lo | Last Night at the Telegraph Club | Penguin Random House/Dutton Books |
| 2022 | Margaret Owen | Little Thieves | Macmillan/Henry Holt & Co. Books for Young Readers |
| 2022 | Amber McBride | Me (Moth) | Macmillan/Feiwel & Friends |
| 2022 | Joan He | The Ones We're Meant to Find | Macmillan/Roaring Brook Press |
| 2023 | Sabaa Tahir | All My Rage | Razorbill/Penguin Random House |
| 2023 | Katie Henry | Gideon Green in Black and White | Katherine Tegen Books/HarperCollins |
| 2023 | Ruta Sepetys | I Must Betray You | Philomel Books/Penguin Random House |
| 2023 | Andrea L. Rogers | Man Made Monsters | Levine Querido |
| 2023 | Kwame Alexander | The Door of No Return | Little, Brown Young Readers |
| 2023 | Lamar Giles | The Getaway | Scholastic |
| 2023 | Axie Oh | The Girl Who Fell Beneath the Sea | Feiwel & Friends/Macmillan |
| 2023 | Isaac Blum | The Life and Crimes of Hoodie Rosen | Philomel Books/Penguin Random House |
| 2023 | Jen Ferguson | The Summer of Bitter and Sweet | Heartdrum/HarperCollins |
| 2023 | Aiden Thomas | The Sunbearer Trials | Feiwel & Friends/Macmillan |
| 2024 | Dan Clay | Becoming a Queen | Roaring Brook Press |
| 2024 | Olivia A. Cole | Dear Medusa | Labyrinth Road |
| 2024 | Rebecca Ross | Divine Rivals | Wednesday Books |
| 2024 | Lesa Cline-Ransome | For Lamb | Holiday House |
| 2024 | Ruchira Gupta | I Kick and I Fly | Scholastic Press |
| 2024 | Deb Caletti | Plan A | Labyrinth Road |
| 2024 | Nick Brooks | Promise Boys | Henry Holt and Co. |
| 2024 | Ari Tison | Saints of the Household | Farrar, Straus and Giroux |
| 2024 | Joelle Wellington | Their Vicious Games | Simon & Schuster Books for Young Readers |
| 2024 | Angeline Boulley | Warrior Girl Unearthed | Henry Holt and Company |
| 2025 | Hannah V. Sawyerr | All the Fighting Parts | Amulet |
| 2025 | Safia Elhillo | Bright Red Fruit | Make Me a World |
| 2025 | Makiia Lucier | Dragonfruit | Clarion Books |
| 2025 | Bessie Flores Zaldivar | Libertad | Dial Books |
| 2025 | K.A. Cobell | Looking for Smoke | Heartdrum |
| 2025 | Lily Sparks | The Merciless King of Moore High | Flux |
| 2025 | Byron Graves | Rez Ball | Heartdrum |
| 2025 | Jas Hammonds | Thirsty | Roaring Brook Press |
| 2025 | Jason Reynolds | Twenty-Four Seconds from Now...: A Love Story | Atheneum |
| 2025 | Mindy McGinnis | Under This Red Rock | Katherine Tegen Books |
| 2026 | DeAndra Davis | All the Noise at Once | Atheneum Books for Young Readers |
| 2026 | Kenneth Oppel | Best of All Worlds | Scholastic Press |
| 2026 | T. L. Simpson | Cope Field | North Star Editions |
| 2026 | K. Ancrum | The Corruption of Hollis Brown | Harper Collins Publishing |
| 2026 | Michelle Jabes Corpora | His Face is the Sun | Sourcebooks Fire |
| 2026 | Rory Power | Kill Creatures | Delacorte Press |
| 2026 | Trang Thanh Tran | They Bloom at Night | Bloomsbury |
| 2026 | Rhonda DeChambeau | Top Heavy | Holiday House |
| 2026 | Hannah V. Sawyerr | Truth Is | Amulet Books |
| 2026 | Kelsey B. Toney | The Unexpected Consequence of Bleeding on a Tuesday | Random House Books for Young Readers |
