= Inexcusable =

2005 book by Chris Lynch

- The cover of "Inexcusable"
- Author: Chris Lynch
- Language: English
- Genre: Young Adult Fiction
- Publisher: Ginee Seo Books
- Publication date: October 25, 2005
- Publication place: United States
- Media type: Print
- Pages: 176 pp (US hardcover edition)
- ISBN: 978-0689847899

Inexcusable is a 2005 novel written by Chris Lynch in the young adult genre. Through first-person narration, it chronicles the life of high school senior Keir Sarafian. A sequel, Irreversible, was published on September 6, 2016.

== Plot summary ==
The novel covers a young man's own perspective on being accused of rape, starting at the moment of accusation and jumping back through an unreliable narration of events, in which he seems himself as a good guy doing what is understandable.

The novel begins with Keir arguing with Gigi about the events which occurred the night before. It continues with Keir's first-person narration of his senior year in high school. Keir is crushed when he learns that Gigi has accused him of rape. He goes on to tell Gigi that he loves her, and would never do such a thing. The novel never mentions Gigi's point of view, so her feelings and thoughts are not taken into consideration through the use of dialogue.

As the novel unfolds, Keir becomes more unpopular because of his substance abuse, school behavior, and his infamous tackle on the football field giving him the nickname "Killer." Keir's self-image dissipates after he accidentally paralyzes an opponent, participates in bullying classmates, and then tries cocaine. First, he leans on Gigi because she listens to him and doesn't judge him. Once he learns about Gigi and her new boyfriend, he is angry and leans on his two sisters, Fran and Mary. Keir's older sisters have mixed feelings about his behavior. He leans on Fran the most because she sees the "good" in Keir despite his terrible actions.

One night close to graduation, after a night of partying and substance abuse, Gigi decides to accompany Keir on a visit to Fran's college and they end up in her dorm room alone. Gigi tells Keir that her boyfriend cannot go to the dance and she needs him to come with her to the dance. Keir thinks Gigi looks beautiful and the "inexcusable" action happens. Then, the setting reverts to the opening with the two arguing about what happened while they were sleeping next to each other.

== Characters ==
- Keir Sarafian: Keir is the 16-year-old protagonist of the novel. He's a popular high school football player who parties, abuses substances and is disobedient in school.
- Gigi Boudakian: Gigi is Keir's best friend, and the person Keir adores. She goes to a party with Keir and participates in substance abuse.
- Ray Sarafian: Ray is Keir's widowed father.
- Quarterback Ken: Ken is the [quarterback] of Keir's football team. He is the reason Keir is given the nickname "Killer"

== Awards and recognition ==
- 2005 National Book Awards Finalist Young People's Literature
- Booklist Editors' Choice – Books for Youth (Older Readers Category), 2005
- School Library Journal's Best Books, 2005
- YALSA Best Book for Young Adults, 2006
- Booklist Starred review, September 15, 2005, p. 55
