= Ben Mikaelsen =

Bolivian American children's literature author

Ben Mikaelsen (born December 8, 1952) is a Bolivian American writer of children's literature.

== Early life and education ==
Ben Mikaelsen was born on December 8, 1952, in La Paz, Bolivia. He wasn't sent to school until fourth grade where he was bullied for his race. Mikaelsen moved to the United States with his family shortly before entering seventh grade, where he encountered further bullying because of his poor English capabilities. As a teen in Minnesota, he taught himself to swim and dive, and this led him to take flight and skydiving lessons. Mikaelsen attended USC and Bemidji State University.

== Personal life ==
When building his home in Montana, Ben adopted an American black bear named Buffy for 26 years until the bear's death in September 2012. Ben Mikaelsen considered Buffy a "750-pound member of my family." He has been writing full-time since 1984 and lives in Anacortes, Washington with his wife, Connie. He has written a few books inspired by his bear, such as Touching Spirit Bear and the sequel Ghost of Spirit Bear. He also took a year out of high school to join a parachute team and compete around Minnesota. He goes around the country visiting schools to teach kids about his life and his experience as a victim of bullying.

== Published works ==
- Rescue Josh McGuire (1991)
- Sparrow Hawk Red (1993)
- Stranded (1995)
- Countdown (1996)
- Petey (1998)
- Touching Spirit Bear (2001)
- Red Midnight (2002)
- Tree Girl (2004)
- Ghost of Spirit Bear (2008)
- Jungle of Bones (2014)

== Awards and honors ==
Mikaelson's work has won many state youth literature awards, including the California Young Reader Medal and Wyoming's Indian Paintbrush Book Award.

- 1991: Golden Spur, Juvenile Fiction, Rescue Josh McGuire
- 1992: International Reading Association Children's Book Award, Older Reader Category, Rescue Josh McGuire
- 1999: ALA Best Fiction for Young Adults, Petey
- 1999: Golden Spur, Juvenile Fiction, Petey
- 2002: ALA Best Fiction for Young Adults, Touching Spirit Bear
