= Edith Pattou =

American writer of fantasy fiction

- Born: Evanston, Illinois, U.S.
- Education: Francis W. Parker School; Scripps College (BA); Claremont Graduate University (MA); University of California, Los Angeles (MLIS)
- Occupation: Writer
- Spouse: Charles Emery
- Children: 1
- Writing career
- Notable work: East
- Website: www.edithpattou.com

Edith Pattou is an American writer of fantasy fiction, including the novel East, an ALA Top Ten Best Book for Young Adults for 2004. She was born in Evanston, Illinois, and she graduated from the Francis W. Parker School, Scripps College (B.A., English), Claremont Graduate School (M.A., English) and UCLA (M.L.I.S.). She is married to Charles Emery, a professor of psychology at Ohio State University. They have one child, a daughter.

== Bibliography ==
=== Songs of Eirren ===
1. Hero's Song (Harcourt Brace Jovanovich, 1991)
2. Fire Arrow: the second song of Eirren (Harcourt Brace, 1998)

=== East/West ===
1. East (Harcourt, 2003); UK title, North Child

2. West (2018), sequel to East

=== Other works ===
- Mrs. Spitzer's Garden (2001), picture book illustrated by Tricia Tusa
- Ghosting (2014)

== Awards and honors ==
=== East ===
Rebecca Caudill Young Readers' Book Award Nominee (2008)

National Public Radio Best in Young Adult Fiction finalist (2012)
