= World War II (series) =

Series of books written by American author Chris Lynch

- Front covers
- The Right Fight; Dead in the Water; Alive and Kicking; The Liberators
- Author: Chris Lynch
- Country: United States
- Language: English
- Genre: Children's fiction
- Publisher: Scholastic Incorporated
- Media type: Print (paperback), ebook
- No. of books: 4

World War II is a series of books written by American author Chris Lynch. The series is made up of four books, the first of which was published in 2013.

== Books ==
=== The Right Fight ===
When World War II becomes imminent, Roman decides to put aside minor league baseball in order to enlist in the US Army, leaving behind his fiancée Hannah. During basic training he discovers that he has a definite talent for driving tanks and Roman is eager to join his fellow soldiers on the front line. His eagerness later turns to horror after he is sent to North Africa to fight the German Afrika Korps, where he witnesses the horrors and atrocities of war firsthand.

=== Dead in the Water ===
Dead in the Water focuses on the older of two brothers, Hank, who joins the US Navy to fight in World War II. This forces him to leave his younger sister Suzie behind but also results in him separating from his brother Theo, the first time that the two have ever really been apart. Hank is assigned to work on the aircraft carrier USS Yorktown, where he quickly bonds with his crewmates over a shared love of baseball. He is soon faced with the brutality of war due to the attack on Pearl Harbor, as the pilots aboard his aircraft carrier must battle Japanese forces and the ship is at constant risk of torpedo attack.

=== Alive and Kicking ===
Book three focuses on Theo, who joined the United States Army Air Forces and becomes a gunner in a B-24 Liberator aircraft. He takes to the work quite well and is not easily rattled until he learns that his brother has been lost at sea after Yorktown was sunk by the Japanese submarine I-168.

=== The Liberators ===
Baseball player Nick is eager to join the war efforts and has pressured his friend and teammate Zachary to join him. The pair go through basic and then paramarine training, after which they join the 650 troop Second Parachute Battalion. They are sent to the recently liberated island of Vella Levella, where they experience their first real battles, and then to Choiseul Island, where they come across a familiar US Marine Corps soldier believed to have been missing at sea.

== Reception ==
The Bulletin of the Center for Children's Books reviewed Dead in the Water, writing that "Although part of an ongoing series, this volume stands sturdily on its own as a expertly crafted war story, with fluid prose, bleak humor, careful attention to historic detail, and a view of “The Good War” worth pondering." It was also reviewed by the School Library Journal and Horn Book Guide, the former of which stated that it would "easily appeal to middle grade fans of World War II fiction and would make a good choice for historical fiction assignments."

The first book in the series, The Right Fight, received reviews from the Bulletin of the Center for Children's Books, Historical Novel Society, and the School Library Journal.
