= West (novel) =

Novel written by Edith Pattou

West is a young adult fantasy novel written by Edith Pattou and published by Houghton Mifflin Harcourt. The book is the sequel to East.

== Background ==
Pattou continued to receive letters from fans of East years after writing the book asking if there would be a sequel, which eventually persuaded Pattou to write West. Pattou mentioned in an interview with Publishers Weekly that she isn't planning on writing a third book in the series, but if she does the protagonists would be Charles and Rose's children.

The audiobook version is read by Renee Raudman, Kirby Heyborne, Taylor Meskimen, Robertson Dean, Kimberly Farr, and Tonya Cornelisse.

== Plot ==
At the end of East, the Troll Queen was believed to be dead, however, she survives and pursues revenge on Rose and Charles. Rose's husband ends up transforming back into his White Bear form and does not remember her.

== Reception ==
Francisca Goldsmith praised the book in the School Library Journal writing, "a wait of longer than a decade proves completely worthwhile". Kirkus Reviews praised the worldbuilding and convincing portrayal of a 16-century Europe. Maggie Reagan praised the novel in Booklist saying that it is "an exciting, layered adventure".
