= Preston Norton =

American author

Preston Norton is an American author of young adult fiction.

== Biography ==
Norton is bisexual and "slightly genderqueer." His partner's name is Erin.

Aside from writing, Norton has taught secondary English Language Arts and mentored individuals with substance use disorders.

== Neanderthal Opens the Door to the Universe (2018) ==
Neanderthal Opens the Door to the Universe was published May 22, 2018 by Disney-Hyperion.

The book received mixed reviews.

In a starred review, Booklist wrote, "Ambitious almost to a fault, the book ... cogently explores large issues that plague and perplex teens. Though occasionally it suffers from hints of contrivance, overall the novel will appeal to all teens who are, themselves, seeking doors to the universe."

Kirkus Reviews wrote, "Teens who enjoy snarky commentary on high school life may be satisfied with these shortcuts, but Norton doesn't open any new doors to the high school universe."

In 2019, the American Library Association included Neanderthal Opens the Door to the Universe in the top ten of its "Best Fiction for Young Adults" list.

=== Censorship ===
In August 2022, Neanderthal Opens the Door to the Universe was listed among 52 books banned by the Alpine School District following the implementation of Utah law H.B. 374, “Sensitive Materials In Schools." Forty-two percent of removed books “feature LBGTQ+ characters and or themes.” Many of the books were removed because they were considered to contain pornographic material according to a new law.

== Publications ==
- The Lost Son with Tamra Torero (2012)
- Blüd and Magick (2013)
- Demonica (2014)
- Marrow (2015)
- Neanderthal Opens the Door to the Universe (2018)
- Where I End and You Begin (2019)
- Hopepunk (2022)
- The House on Yeet Street (2024)
