= Love Among the Walnuts =

Book by Jean Ferris

Love Among the Walnuts: or How I Saved My Family from Being Poisoned
- The cover of the first edition of Love Among the Walnuts
- Author: Jean Ferris
- Language: English
- Genre: Young adult novel
- Publisher: Harcourt
- Publication date: September 1, 1998
- Publication place: United States
- Media type: Print (paperback)
- Pages: 228
- ISBN: 978-0-15-206227-9

Love Among the Walnuts: or How I Saved My Family from Being Poisoned (Note: Some sources incorrectly list the book's title as Love Among the Walnuts: or How I Saved My Entire Family from Being Poisoned.) is a farcical, satirical young adult novel with fairy tale elements written by Jean Ferris. The story revolves around a young man, Sandy, whose family is poisoned by his scheming uncles in a bid to gain the family fortune. He moves them to Walnut Manor, a neighboring convalescent home, where, with the help of the nurse Sunnie, he tries to save his family and benefit the manor's misunderstood residents.

Love Among the Walnuts was first published on September 1, 1998, by Harcourt. Reviews of the work have been mostly positive, with focus on the story's style and tone. It was listed as a YALSA Best Book for Young Adults and placed third on the ranked Teens' Top Ten Books list, both in 1999.

== Plot ==
Horatio Alger Huntington-Ackerman, a successful businessperson, marries Mousey Huntington-Ackerman (née Malone), a striving actor, and has a child named Sandy. They move with their butler Bentley and his wife Flossie to a new country estate called Eclipse with no neighbors except the residents of Walnut Manor, a convalescent home. One evening when Sandy is a young adult, his uncles Bart and Bernie visit Eclipse. The uncles feed the family a poisoned birthday cake in an attempt to inherit the family fortune, sending everyone but Sandy and Bentley into a coma.

A court ruling mandates that a doctor be present to oversee care for the comatose patients ("the sleepers"). To meet this requirement, Sandy moves them next door to Walnut Manor. There, he meets Dr. Waldemar, the director of the facility, and Sunnie Stone, a nurse hired to care for the sleepers. While Bentley researches a cure of the sleepers' comas, Sandy and Sunnie acquaint themselves with the other patients of Walnut Manor and ultimately fall in love with one another.

With the help of Dr. Waldemar and the manor's residents, Sandy and Sunnie discover that Walnut Manor's patients were placed in the facility's care by their relatives, who, as Walnut Manor's board of directors, have been embezzling from the home. They expose the board of directors' misdeeds and Bentley revives the sleepers from their coma. Sandy, Sunnie, Dr. Waldemar, and the residents of Walnut Manor together thwart Bart and Bernie and send them to prison.

== Publication and genre ==
Love Among the Walnuts was first published on September 1, 1998, by Harcourt. Reviewers recommended various appropriate reading ranges, including ages 12–14 and ages 10 and older.

The novel has been characterized as a farce, satire, and fairy tale. Alethea K. Helbig and Agnes Regan Perkins wrote that story's exploration of familial greed was "in the style of a Victorian melodrama" and Connie Tyrrell Burns, in School Library Journal, described the story as "a British farce without the off-color humor". In their review of young adult literature that had received recognition by major literary publications between 1997 and 2001, Helbig and Perkins described Love Among the Walnuts as one of few recognized titles with humorous elements. They described the central theme of the novel as "the value to personal and group well-being of loving-kindness and caring".

== Reception ==
Love Among the Walnuts received mostly positive reviews. Helbig and Perkins commented that "the large cast consists of individualized, complementary, and affectionately handled characters" and the novel's themes "are conveyed with skill and invention". Publishers Weekly praised the story for its "cast of offbeat characters and some punchy dialogue" while writing that its "plot will have more appeal for adults than children." In The Horn Book Magazine, Anne St. John commented that Sandy's "emotional responses and internal struggles will ring true with teenagers who are coming of age in a time of turmoil". According to Elaine McGuire of Voice of Youth Advocates, Love Among the Walnuts is "dripping with charm but never cloying ... a fabulous book with lots of lessons about our sickeningly fast-paced '90s lifestyles." Paula Rohrlick, writing in Kliatt, compared Love Among the Walnuts favorably to Ferris's later work, Once Upon a Marigold, describing both stories as "madcap".

For certain reviewers, the tone and style reinforced the novel's quality. In School Library Journal, Burns commented that Love Among the Walnuts "is intentionally melodramatic, coincidental, improbable, and hilarious. The restrained, tongue-in-cheek tone heightens the humor of this spoof." Kirkus Reviews compared the tone and plot of the story to that of a film directed by Preston Sturges or Frank Capra, describing how it "has an unconventional style and offbeat sense of humor that will delight readers or exhaust them, depending on their tolerance for screwball comedies." Nancy Hinkel, then Associate Editor at Alfred A. Knopf and Crown Books for Young Readers, wrote that the story has "great writing, original ideas, and real style" as well as "a good dose of dry humor that slips past if you're not paying attention." Helbig and Perkins described the novel's style as "fast moving, engaging, and witty."

Several reviews indicated reservations in recommending Love Among the Walnuts. Publishers Weekly wrote that "Sandy's accelerated growth from a baby in the nursery to an adult smitten with Sunny (in the space of a chapter) early on in the novel leaves young readers little to identify with." Kirkus Reviews commented that "a financial subplot and a muddle of characters, defined by their eccentricities, clog the pacing" of the story while St. John in The Horn Book Magazine said that "some of the characters are two-dimensional".

Love Among the Walnuts was one of 50 fiction titles selected as a 1999 Young Adult Library Services Association (YALSA) Best Book for Young Adults and was ranked third (after J. K. Rowling's Harry Potter and the Sorcerer's Stone and Louis Sachar's Holes) on YALSA's list of Teens' Top Ten Books of 1999.
