= All the Truth That's in Me =

Young adult novel by Julie Berry

- Author: Julie Berry
- Language: English
- Genre: Young adult novel
- Publisher: Viking Books for Young Readers
- Publication date: August 31, 2013
- ISBN: 9780670786152

All the Truth That's in Me is a 2013 young adult novel by Julie Berry. The novel tells the story of Judith, a young woman from a deeply religious community who is kidnapped for two years and brought back with her tongue partially removed. The story deals with her life after returning and how she is treated by the village.

All the Truth That's in Me was shortlisted for the Carnegie Medal in 2014.

== Plot ==
Judith Finch is a girl growing up in what appears to be a Puritan village (though a specific time setting is never given). She is deeply in love with her childhood friend Lucas, who is a few years older. One day at a church event her best friend Lottie tells Judith she has been seeing a boy in secret. Worried that the boy is Lucas, Judith sneaks out one night and tries to spy on Lottie. Instead she witnesses Lottie being strangled by a man Judith cannot see.

That same night Judith is kidnapped by Lucas's alcoholic father, whom the village believes died in a fire years before but has secretly been hiding deep in the forest. Some time later, Lottie's nude body is found in the river. Judith remains with Lucas' father for two years until one night, in order to stop himself from molesting Judith, and so she can't give up his location, cuts out part of her tongue and sets her free.

When she returns home she tries to speak to her mother to explain what happened, but her mother forbids her from ever speaking in her presence, ashamed of Judith's now slurred and difficult speech.

Time passes and Lucas announces his engagement to a girl named Mary, breaking Judith's heart. Judith later discovers Mary is actually in love with someone else, but is marrying Lucas because he is well off and has a large farm.

One day, sails are spotted, and the villagers panic, thinking people from their home country, "Homelanders" are coming to wage war and take over their prosperous town. All the men in town plan to fight, including Lucas and Judith's brother Darryl, even though they are grossly outnumbered and this will mean certain death. Judith cannot bear the thought of Lucas dying, so she goes into the woods to find his father, who she knows has a huge cashe of gunpowder in his home. Lucas' father agrees to help but only if Judith will marry him. She agrees and takes him to the battle on a well-trained mare he owns.

During the fighting, Lucas' father blows himself up along with the enemy ships. The villagers win, but many are dead and injured, including Judith's brother Darryl, who accidentally shoots himself in the foot and has to have it amputated. The boy Mary loves is also injured, causing her to end her engagement to Lucas and marry him instead. Grateful that Mary doesn't marry Lucas, she and Judith become friends, and Mary helps Judith re-learn speech.

The entire village turns on Lucas after the battle, assuming he called on his father for help and suspecting that he had not only been concealing his father the whole time, but actually helped his father kill Lottie and kidnap Judith. Darryl decides that since he can't work on the farm, he will go back to school and Judith decides to join him. The schoolmaster, however, makes unwanted advances towards Judith, and begins spying on her, catching her leaving her house at night on several occasions, including one visit to Lucas' cabin. He and other villagers plan an ambush to trick Lucas into giving away the location of his father's hidden home which he is able to go to because his father's horse, Phantom, knows the way.

Lucas is badly beaten and taken to court, accused of murder, kidnapping, hiding his father and sleeping with Judith. Judith is also accused of being complicit in all of this and both are put in the stocks. Judith finally decides to reveal to the village that she can actually speak, and testifies that Lucas did not know where his father was. She also reveals it was Lottie's own father who killer her, and Lucas' father cut off Judith's tongue so she could not name him as the true killer, thinking it would keep her safe. Lottie's father is arrested, Lucas confesses his love for Judith and they marry. The novel ends with the two contemplating whether to stay in their village or move west.

== Reception ==
All the Truth That's in Me is a Junior Library Guild selection.

The novel was generally well received by critics, including starred reviews from Booklist, Kirkus Reviews, Publishers Weekly, and Kirkus Reviews called the novel "a tale of uncommon elegance, power and originality." Publishers Weekly indicated that Berry's "poetic narrative ... will draw readers in, and the gradual unveiling of secrets will keep them absorbed."

Reviewing the novel in the New York Times, Jennifer Hubert Swan called All the Truth That's in Me "disturbing and provocative."

Writing for The Guardian, Safah called the novel " a dark and chilling tale of abuse and secrets, of love and loss, of silence and courage." Safah further highlighted Berry's writing style, writing that the novel's "second person narration was one so unique and almost lyrical, with a rhythm and a kind of music I've never read before. Each chapter is usually only half a page long, sometimes less, it keeps with the way Judith might think, in short sequences. She's a very calculating kind of person and seems to always see deeper than others, as if her lack of speech opened her eyes and ears to a far more intricate world only she can see and the narration portrayed it wonderfully."

Abigail Packard, writing for Children's Book and Media Review, called the novel "very powerful," highlighting how "Berry has created strikingly real and believable characters." She further noted, "The language of the story is beautiful and some of the scenes are intensely powerful as Berry delves into the minds of her characters."

The audiobook edition, narrated by Kathleen McInerney, received a starred review from Booklist and School Library Journal, who noted, "Kathleen McInferney reads the story using different tones for each character. Her voice for Judith is spot-on in the way she addresses both her internal voice and her speech impediment." Publishers Weekly similarly wrote, "The narrator also provides distinct character voices that are varied and appropriate. However, McInerney is at her best when rendering Judith’s thoughts and vocalizing the character’s inner frustration."

Kirkus Reviews, School Library Journal, The Horn Book Magazine named All the Truth That's in Me one of the best young adult novels of the 2013.

Awards and honors for All the Truth That's in Me
Year	Award	Result	Ref.
2014	Best Fiction for Young Adults	Top 10	
2014	Carnegie Medal	Shortlist	
2014	Edgar Award for Best Young Adult	Shortlist	
2014	Silver Inky Award	Winner	
