= Lovely War =

2019 novel by Julie Berry

- Author: Julie Berry
- Language: English
- Publisher: Viking Books for Young Readers
- Publication date: March 5, 2019
- Pages: 480
- ISBN: 978-0-147-51297-0

Lovely War is a young adult romance novel by Julie Berry, published March 5, 2019 by Viking Books for Young Readers. The book is a New York Times Bestseller and was well-received by critics.

== Reception ==
=== Reviews ===
Lovely War is a New York Times Bestseller and was generally well-received by critics, including starred reviews from Booklist, Kirkus Reviews, Publishers Weekly, School Library Journal, and Shelf Awareness.

Booklist wrote, "Lovely War proves again that Berry is one of our most ambitious writers. Happily for us, that ambition so often results in great success."

Kirkus Reviews called the novel an "unforgettable romance so Olympian in scope, human at its core, and lyrical in its prose that it must be divinely inspired."

Multiple reviewers highlighted the historical aspects of the book. Shelf Awareness emphasized how Berry "weaves factual historical events and backdrops into an exquisitely crafted, funny and, yes, epic, novel." Publishers Weekly wrote, "Berry ... brings to life wartime horrors and passions with commentary from Olympian gods in this love story filled with vivid historical detail." Booklist added that "all that detail folds effortlessly into the story, so uncommon in frame but heartbreakingly familiar in emotion."

Both the written text and audiobook are Junior Library Guild books.

=== Awards and honors ===
Before Lovely War's release, it landed on Barnes & Noble's and Cosmopolitan's "most anticipated books" lists. After its release, it landed on several "best of" lists:

- Wall Street Journal's "Best Children's Books of 2019"
- BookPage's "Best Books of 2019: Young Adult"
- Kirkus Reviews' "Best YA Romance of 2019"
- BuzzFeed's "31 Young Adult Books That We Deemed The Best Of 2019"
- Shelf Awareness' "2019 Best Children's & Teen Books of the Year"
- The Young Folk's "Best Historical YA Fiction of 2019"
- Horn Book Fanfare Title (2019)
- The Bulletin of the Center for Children's Books Blue Ribbon Book (2019)

The audiobook, narrated by Allan Corduner and a full cast, also received a starred review from Booklist, who stated, "This is truly an audio production for the ages."

Year	Award		Result	Ref.
2019	Booklist Editors' Choice:	Youth Audio	Selection	
2019	Goodreads Choice Award	Young Adult Fiction	Nominee	
2019	Whitney Award	—	Winner	
2020	Amelia Elizabeth Walden Award	—	Winner	
2020	American Library Association	Amazing Audiobooks for Young Adults	Selection	
2020	American Library Association	Best Fiction for Young Adults	Top Ten	
2020	Audie Award	Young Adult	Finalist	
2020	Golden Kite Award	Young Adult Fiction	Winner	
2020	Young Adult Library Services Association	Teens Choices	Top Ten	
