= The Great Wide Sea =

2010 novel by M. H. Herlong

- Author: M. H. Herlong
- Language: English
- Publication place: United States

The Great Wide Sea is a novel by M. H. Herlong, published by Puffin in 2010. The story pits father against son, and brothers against nature in what the School Library Journal calls "an engrossing, suspenseful tale of survival" at sea.

== Reception ==
The Great Wide Sea received the following accolades:

- 2009, Texas Lone Star Reading List book
- 2010, American Library Association, listed in the top ten Best Books for Young Adults
- 2010, Dorothy Canfield Fisher Children's Book Award nominee
- 2011, Rebecca Caudill Young Readers' Book Award nominee

Furthermore, The Great Wide Sea has been named to "top young adult" reading lists for middle school and high school students in New Mexico, Texas, Kentucky, Louisiana, Alabama, South Carolina, Illinois, Vermont, New Hampshire, and Maine. The Times-Picayune called it one of the best debut novels of the year.
