= Julie Berry =

American author

- Born: September 3, 1974 (age 51)
- Education: Rensselaer Polytechnic Institute (BS); Vermont College of Fine Arts (MFA)
- Occupation: Author
- Spouse: Phil Berry (m. 1995)
- Writing career
- Genres: Children's literature; young adult fiction
- Notable works: All the Truth That's in Me (2014); Lovely War (2019)
- Notable awards: Inky Award (2014); Whitney Award (2019); Amelia Elizabeth Walden Award (2020); Golden Kite Award (2020)

Julie Berry (born September 3, 1974) is an American author of children's and young adults books and winner of several national book awards.

== Biography ==
Julie Gardner Berry grew up on a farm in rural Medina, New York, as the youngest of seven children in a Mormon family. She received a B.S. in communications at Rensselaer Polytechnic Institute (RPI) in Troy, New York, in 1995 and later earned an M.F.A. from Vermont College of Fine Arts in 2008. Berry met her husband, actor Phil Berry at RPI. They married in 1995. They have four sons together. The family lived for many years in Maynard, Massachusetts, west of Boston, before moving to Temple City, California. During the early years of her writing career Berry also worked as marketing director with the family business, a data collection software company. While living in Maynard, Berry was a columnist for the MetroWest Daily News.

Julie and her family moved back to Medina, New York, in 2021. She purchased the independent bookstore, The Book Shoppe, which she renovated and renamed the Author's Note.

== Awards and honors ==
Seven of Berry's books are Junior Library Guild selections: All the Truth That's In Me (2014), The Passion of Dolssa (2017), The Emperor’s Ostrich (2017), Lovely War (2019), and Wishes and Wellingtons (2020).

All the Truth That's in Me was named one of the best books of the year by The Horn Book, Kirkus Reviews, and School Library Journal.

The Scandalous Sisterhood of Prickwillow Place was named one of the best children's books of 2014 by the Wall Street Journal.

The Passion of Dolssa was a New York Times Notable Title.

Lovely War was a New York Times bestseller and was named one of the best books of 2019 by The Bulletin of the Center for Children's Books, The Horn Book, Kirkus Reviews, Publishers Weekly, School Library Journal, Shelf Awareness, and the Wall Street Journal. It was also a New York Times Notable Children’s Books of 2016.

Awards for Berry's writing
Year	Title	Award	Result	Ref.
2014	All the Truth That’s in Me	American Library Association Best Fiction for Young Adults	Top 10	
2014	All the Truth That’s in Me	Carnegie Medal	Shortlist	
2014	All the Truth That’s in Me	Edgar Award for Best Young Adult	Finalist	
2014	All the Truth That’s in Me	Inky Award for Silver Inky	Winner	
2014	The Scandalous Sisterhood of Prickwillow Place	Whitney Award for Best Youth Fiction	Winner	
2015	The Scandalous Sisterhood of Prickwillow Place	American Library Association Amazing Audiobooks for Young Adults	Selection	
2015	The Scandalous Sisterhood of Prickwillow Place	Odyssey Award	Honor	
2017	The Passion of Dolssa	American Library Association Best Fiction for Young Adults	Top 10	
2017	The Passion of Dolssa	Booklist Editors' Choice: Books for Youth	Selection	
2017	The Passion of Dolssa	Los Angeles Times Book Prize for Young Adult Literature	Honor	
2017	The Passion of Dolssa	Michael L. Printz Award	Honor	
2019	Lovely War	Booklist Editors' Choice: Youth Audio	Selection	
2019	Lovely War	Goodreads Choice Award for Young Adult Fiction	Nominee	
2019	Lovely War	Outstanding Books for the College Bound	Selection	
2019	Lovely War	Whitney Award	Winner	
2020	Lovely War	Amelia Elizabeth Walden Award	Winner	
2020	Lovely War	American Library Association Amazing Audiobooks for Young Adults	Selection	
2020	Lovely War	American Library Association Best Fiction for Young Adults	Top Ten	
2020	Lovely War	Audie Award for Young Adult	Finalist	
2020	Lovely War	Golden Kite Award for Young Adult Fiction	Winner	
2020	Lovely War	Young Adult Library Services Association Teens Choices	Top 10	

== Books ==
- The Amaranth Enchantment (2009)
- Secondhand Charm (2010)
- Splurch Academy for Disruptive Boys: The Rat Brain Fiasco (2010) with Sally Gardner
- Splurch Academy for Disruptive Boys: Curse of the Bizarro Beetle (2010) with Sally Gardner
- Splurch Academy for Disruptive Boys: The Colossal Fossil Freakout (2011) with Sally Gardner
- Splurch Academy for Disruptive Boys: The Trouble with Squids (2011) with Sally Gardner
- All the Truth That’s In Me (2013) Viking/Penguin Group, New York, NY. ISBN 978-0142427309
- The Scandalous Sisterhood of Prickwillow Place (2014) Roaring Brook Press, New York, NY. ISBN 978-1596439566
- The Passion of Dolssa (2017) Penguin Books, New York, NY. ISBN 978-0451469922
- The Emperor’s Ostrich (2017) Roaring Brook Press, New York, NY. ISBN 978-1596439580
- Wishes and Wellingtons (2018) Audible Originals, LLC, an AMAZON company. (audiobook)
- Lovely War (2019) Viking Press, New York, NY. ISBN 978-0451469939
- Crime and Carpetbags (2021) Sourcebooks Young Readers. ISBN 978-1728231495
- Cranky Right Now (2021) Sounds True. ISBN 978-1683646648
