= This Is My America =

2020 young adult novel by Kim Johnson

- Author: Kim Johnson
- Language: English
- Publisher: Random House Children's Books
- Publication date: July 28, 2020
- Pages: 416
- ISBN: 978-0-593-11878-8

This Is My America is a young adult novel by Kim Johnson, published July 28, 2020 by Random House Children's Books, that explores injustices in the United States' justice system.

== Reception ==
This Is My America received positive reviews from multiple entities, including starred reviews from Kirkus, who called the book "Harrowing and worthwhile; a call-to-action from the anti-racist insights of a generation of Black activists," as well as from Publishers Weekly, who claimed, "Activist Johnson's powerful debut is a timely testimony that echoes the social realities behind today's #BlackLivesMatter protests." Nic Stone said the book gives "[a]n incredible and searing examination of the often-tragic collision of racism and a flawed criminal justice system." Paste Magazine said the book "promises a powerful story about racial injustice." The School Library Journal called it a "strong debut" and Shelf Awareness named it "an incisive condemnation of the racist criminal justice system, mass incarceration and capital punishment. . . . A necessary add to all shelves, especially those focused on anti-racism and #BlackLivesMatter." NPR named it Book of the Year.

The book also received the following accolades:

- Goodreads Choice Award for Young Adult Fiction Nominee (2020)
- American Library Association (ALA) Best Fiction for Young Adults (2021)
- ALA Amazing Audiobooks for Young Adults (2021)
- Rise: A Feminist Book Project List (2021)
