= The Stars and the Blackness Between Them =

2019 young adult fiction book by Junauda Petrus

- First edition hardcover
- Author: Junauda Petrus
- Cover artist: Charles Chaisson
- Language: English
- Genre: Young adult fiction
- Published: 2019 (Dutton)
- Publication place: United States
- Media type: Print (Hardcover)
- Pages: 320 (Hardcover edition)
- ISBN: 978-0-5255-5548-3

The Stars and the Blackness Between Them is an American young adult fiction book by Junauda Petrus. It was released on September 17, 2019, by Dutton Books, and tells the story of two teenage girls who build a relationship, as one acclimates to life in Minneapolis after moving from Trinidad, and the other battles an illness. The Stars and the Blackness Between Them received a Coretta Scott King Honor Award.

In February 2021, Petrus announced that a film adaptation is in development.

== Synopsis ==
16-year-old Audre lives in Port of Spain, Trinidad. At the urging of her mother, she attends church, but forms a romantic relationship with the pastor's granddaughter, Neri. After they are caught engaging in sexual activity, Audre is sent to live with her father in Minneapolis, where she meets Mabel. Mabel is questioning her own sexuality, and the two become friends. As they prepare for the upcoming school year, Mabel finds out she has a life-threatening illness. Audre supports Mabel as she undergoes treatment, both emotionally and through healing practices she has learned from her grandmother.

== Publication ==
2019, United States, Dutton Books, ISBN 978-0525555483, 17 September 2019, Hardback.

== Critical reception ==
The book received positive critical reception. Kirkus Reviews described The Stars and the Blackness Between Them in a starred review: "Through a nonlinear storyline and two secondary characters, Afua and Queenie, the author beautifully interjects elements of magical realism while delving into the complexities of spirituality. Readers seeking a deep, uplifting love story will not be disappointed as the novel covers both flourishing feelings and bigger questions around belief and what happens when we face our own mortality." In a second starred review Publishers Weekly wrote, "Petrus’s earnest debut successfully, touchingly combines elements of fantasy, bittersweet realism, and potent, affecting spirituality to tell the coming-of-age story of two complex, beautifully drawn young black women whose friendship and love draw them together even as Mabel’s failing health pushes them apart."

== Accolades ==
- 2019 - Kirkus Reviews - 2019 Best Book
- 2020 - Coretta Scott King Book Award
- 2020 - American Library Association - Top Ten Best Fiction for Young Adults Book
