= Syed M. Masood =

Pakistani-American author

- Education: University of Toronto; College of William & Mary
- Occupation: Author

Syed M. Masood is a Pakistani-American author.

== Personal life ==
Masood grew up in Karachi, Pakistan and has been a citizen of three countries, living in nine cities. He says his nomadic, multicultural life has taught him "human beings are the same everywhere..., and the theme of this fundamental human unity informs everything I write."

Masood currently lives in Sacramento with his two children, ages two and four.

== Education ==
Masood studied English literature at the University of Toronto, then attended the William and Mary School of Law.

== Career ==
Outside of writing, Masood currently practices law.

== Selected works ==
=== More Than Just a Pretty Face (2020) ===
More Than Just a Pretty Face, published August 4, 2020 by Little, Brown Books for Young Readers, is a young adult novel.

Kirkus called the novel "a charming teen romance with real substance." School Library Journal also provided a positive review.

In a mixed review, Booklist said the book was "seriously funny, with all of the trappings of a truly good rom-com." They also noted that "the less-traditional Muslim characters might be a point of consternation for some (especially as depicted through the stereotyping of Sohrab’s character as he becomes more involved in Islam); nonetheless, Danyal’s seismic character arc, Bisma and his evolving love, and fascinating historical insights make for an entertaining read." Publishers Weekly also found the characters a bit two-dimensional, noting that while "Danyal develops into a more mature and endearing protagonist, ... supporting characters lack nuance."

More Than Just a Pretty Face is a Junior Library Guild selection, and the American Library Association named it one of the top ten best fiction books for young adults in 2021.

=== The Bad Muslim Discount (2021) ===
The Bad Muslim Discount, published February 2, 2021 by Doubleday Books, follows "two families from Pakistan and Iraq in the 1990s to San Francisco in 2016."

Booklist provided a starred review, saying the book provides "[a] moving, comic take on the immigrant experience," noting that "Masood adeptly balances humor with pathos in this unforgettable, twisting tale." In another starred review, Library Journal lauded Masood's writing, calling him "born storyteller" who "has crafted a fast-paced page-turner with plenty of insightful commentary on religion, family, love, and national politics in this debut novel that is expertly written and a joy to read."

The New York Times Book Review and The New Yorker also provided positive reviews.

However, Publishers Weekly called The Bad Muslim Discount "ambitious" yet "flawed," noting that "[d]espite many insightful moments, Masood’s characters never fully come to life." Kirkus echoed the sentiment, calling the novel "engaging though overly complicated."

The audiobook, narrated by Pej Vahdat and Hend Ayoub, received a starred review from Library Journal, who called the novel "[i]nsightful, entertaining, and warmly recommended," claiming that "Both narrators modulate the novel’s notable shifts in tone by inhabiting their characters engagingly. They reminds listeners to consider the vantage points by which Masood’s book observes America, as both a destination and an actor on the world stage." Booklist provided a mixed review, noting that "both debut narrators can expect long audiobook careers because they’re that good," but they are not "a dynamic duo." They audiobook is "plagued by jarring inconsistency between chapters. Names are different enough to need a rewind, and while Vahdat portrays Zuha as patiently charming, Ayoub voices her as unnecessarily, unrecognizably caustic. A more careful production would have better served these notable performers and been an easy enhancement for Masood’s provocative narrative."

== Publications ==
- More Than Just a Pretty Face (August 2020)
- The Bad Muslim Discount (February 2021)
- Sway With Me (November 2020)
