= Shivaun Plozza =

Australian author

- Born: Victoria, Australia
- Occupation: Author
- Writing career
- Genres: Children's literature, young adult fiction
- Website: www.shivaunplozza.com

Shivaun Plozza is an Australian author of books for children and young adults. She also works as an editor, manuscript assessor and illustrator.

== Biography ==
Plozza grew up in regional Victoria, Australia. Plozza's debut novel, Frankie won several awards including the Davitt Award, High Commendation from the Victorian Premier's Literary Awards, a Children's Book of the Year Award: Older Readers Notable Book Award, and was listed as one of the Top Ten Best Fiction for Young Adults in 2019 by the Young Adult Library Services Association. Her second novel, Tin Heart was inspired by her brother's liver transplant.

Plozza also helped establish the grass-roots digital platform Oz Authors Online which was founded in 2020 to host YA Fiction author events in response to COVID-19 restrictions.

== Bibliography ==
=== Novels ===
- Frankie (2016)
- Tin Heart (2018)
- The Boy, The Wolf and the Stars (2020)
- A Reluctant Witch's Guide to Magic (2022)
- Meet Me at the Moon Tree (2023)
- Summer of Shipwrecks (2024)
- The Worst Perfect Moment (2024)
- Running in Circles (2026)

=== Short fiction ===
- “The Point” in Where The Shoreline Used To Be, edited by Susan La Marca and Pam Macintyre (2016)
- “The Challenge” in Speccy-tacular Footy Stories (2018)

== Awards and honours ==
- 2026 - CBCA Notable -Book of the year: Older Readers: The Worst Perfect Moment
- 2024 - Star - Kirkus Review: The Worst Perfect Moment
- 2024 - CBCA Notable - Book of the Year: Younger Readers: Meet me at the Moon Tree
- 2019 - Star - Kirkus Review: Tin Heart
- 2019 - Top Ten Best Fiction - American Library Association: Frankie
- 2019 - Highly Commended - Victorian Premier's Literary Award; Writing for Young Adults: Tin Heart
- 2017 - CBCA Shortlisted - Book of the Year: Older Readers: Frankie
- 2017 - CBCA Notable - Book of the Year: Older Readers: Frankie
- 2017 - Highly Commended - Victorian Premier's Literary Award: Writing for Young Adults: Frankie
- 2017 - Winner - Sisters in Crime Australia's Davitt Award (YA Category): Frankie
- 2017 - Shortlisted - Book for the Gold Inky Award: Frankie

== Fellowships ==
- 2019 May Gibbs Fellowship 2019
- 2018 Bundanon Trust - Artist in Residence
- 2015 Varuna Residential Fellowship
- 2014 Glenfern Fellowship
