= Grasshopper Jungle =

2014 book by Andrew A. Smith

- Cover of the first edition (2014)
- Author: Andrew A. Smith
- Cover artist: Christian Fuenfhausen
- Language: English
- Genre: Young adult sci-fi, coming of age
- Publisher: Penguin books (US) Electric Monkey (UK)
- Publication date: February 11, 2014
- Publication place: United States
- Media type: Print (hardback & paperback)
- Pages: 400 (hardback, first edition)
- ISBN: 978-0525426035
- Followed by: Exile from Eden: Or, After the Hole

Grasshopper Jungle is a 2014 young adult novel written by American author Andrew A. Smith that follows a cast of characters living in the fictional, run-down, half-abandoned town of Ealing, Iowa. The story follows the life of two young high school boys who fight for their lives during an apocalypse.

The novel was followed by a sequel, Exile from Eden, which was released in 2019.

== Synopsis ==
Grasshopper Jungle, set in the town of Ealing, Iowa during a modern economic recession, is narrated by the main character Austin Szerba. Austin often struggles with his own sexual thoughts and feelings for both his best friend Robby Brees and his girlfriend Shann Collins. Although Austin focuses on the present, he also tells stories of his Polish ancestors. The reader later discovers that the novel is in fact Austin's self-recorded history.

While skateboarding through an alley and smoking cigarettes together near the Ealing Mall, Austin and Robby are attacked by a neighboring gang of bullies, led by Grant Wallace, who steal their skateboards and shoes and throw them onto the nearby roof of "From Attic to Seller Consignment Store" and proceed to beat up Austin and Robby, causing Robby to bleed all over the asphalt. After picking up Shann, Austin and Robby head to the roof to retrieve their lost items. The boys discover some weird objects on the roof including a flamingo and film strips. They find their belongings and decide to sneak inside the store through the roof access. Inside, they discover several mysterious objects in the office of the owner, Johnny McKeon. One of these items, Contained MI Plague Strain 412E, is stolen by Grant Wallace, who has broken into the store. The vial is shattered outside onto Robby's blood stain and Robby, Austin and Shann drive away. Unknown to anyone, the strain begins to take control of its first victims.

During a visit to a gay bar, Robby and Austin watch as one of the first infected, Hungry Jack, sheds his human exterior turning into a giant praying mantis after he is hit by a car. After finding a hidden message in Shann's house, Shann, Robby, Austin discover an underground shelter under an abandoned silo. This bunker, known as Eden, was constructed in the 1970s and was built by McKeon Industries. McKeon had been in charge of the production of the mysterious objects that the boys had found, including the vial of Contained MI Plague Strain 412E. The trio explore the facility and learn through watching a five-part film that McKeon Industries had been developing “unstoppable soldiers”, which in reality were large, invincible praying mantises. The project was so successful that Eden was constructed in the event of an outbreak to preserve mankind. After viewing the first three films, Robby and Austin are forced to retrieve the remaining films. Outside of Eden, the praying mantises hatch out of their victims and begin to do their two favorite things: eating and mating.

On their way to retrieve the films, Austin is attacked by Hungry Jack, who, for unknown reasons, scampers away at the sight Robby. The boys return to Eden and learn from the film that only Robby's blood can defeat the creatures. Robby's blood is extracted and placed into paint-balls in order to fight back against the unstoppable soldiers. They return to the surface only to discover it is too late; the bugs have already repopulated and now completely outnumber them.

At the end of the novel, Austin confirms that they were not successful in reversing the effects of the plague and that the world has been taken over by large praying mantises, with a small number of survivors living in Eden. Shann gives birth to Austin's son Arek, and Austin and Robby live their lives in the underground silo only leaving during the winter months to scavenge.

== Characters ==
Austin Szerba: Main protagonist, narrator of Grasshopper Jungle, historian, feels that history is important, records events that happen in his journal, is confused about his sexuality and often has dreams of sexual intimacy with Shannon Collins and Robby Brees. He attends Curtis Crane 67 Lutheran Academy in the fictional town of Ealing, Iowa. Austin has an older brother, who is in the Marines.

Robby Brees: Best friends with Austin Szerba, always hanging around him, in love with Austin, but is afraid to tell him. Goes by "Robby". His father, Robert Brees Sr., left when Robby was in eighth grade. Enjoys skateboarding and smokes often with Austin. Attends Curtis Crane Lutheran Academy. It's Robby's blood that activated Contained MI Plague Strain 412E; inadvertently making him their creator. Once this is discovered, he allows his blood to be extracted even though he is afraid of needles.

Shannon Collins: Austin Szerba's girlfriend. She's called "Shann" by Austin and Robby. Shann attends the girls' side of Curtis Crane Lutheran Academy, and has been dating Austin since eighth grade. At the beginning of the novel, Shann's mother has recently married Johnny McKeon and they move into the McKeon mansion.

== Background ==
In the summer of 2011, the Wall Street Journal published a piece on his book, The Marbury Lens, deeming it too dark and harmful for young readers. Smith took this accusation personally, causing him to only write for himself and stop publishing. Around the same time, his son had gone off to college and, after a few weeks, became homesick and wanted to read one of Smith's stories; Smith happily agreed to give his son his newest creation, Grasshopper Jungle. His son loved it and pushed him to consider publishing it. Smith stated that he wrote the novel straight through, with no outline or basis on what it was going to be and he liked to throw random things that he found through Google searches into the book.

The three main characters of Grasshopper Jungle were created by Smith from one of his comics called Dystopia, U.S.A, which also took place in the town of Ealing, Iowa, the same town that the novel takes place in. Smith bases his characters after real people he has met and his settings off of real places he has been to. According to Smith, Baby, the talking bird from a flashback in Grasshopper Jungle, was a real bird that his niece owned and Hungary Jack, the hobo, is someone Smith knows and even made an appearance in his second novel, In the Path of Falling Objects. The title of the novel comes from Smith's hobby of running; one of his favorite places to run is a small hilly area near his home. Every August that area would become infested with grasshoppers so he nicknamed it Grasshopper Jungle. The area of Grasshopper Jungle that appears in the novel is based on an area very similar to one that Smith would play around during his childhood.

Smith has said that Austin Szerba, the main character of Grasshopper Jungle, is probably 85% autobiographical and that Austin is based on his feelings during the time. Smith also stated that Austin's last name, Szerba, is actually not a real Polish name and that he made it up because he liked the way the S and Z looked next to each other. After a quick investigation, Smith found out that the name could have been used as an Americanization of the real Polish name Szczerba; this inspired Smith to include flashbacks of Polish history in Grasshopper Jungle.

== Reception and awards ==
Grasshopper Jungle has been praised for its unusual take on the coming-of-age genre which is described as having “a markedly different tone and timbre” when compared to other young adult novels. The book's bizarre, dark style is positively compared to that of Kurt Vonnegut in Slaughterhouse-Five given the "scattered", "outlandish" nature of the narrative. Smith's storytelling in Grasshopper Jungle has been described as “intricate” and “grimly comedic” with respect to character development and plot structure. The novel has garnered some slight criticism, mostly due to the "kooky" science fiction aspect. Grasshopper Jungle has been awarded the Boston Globe-Horne Book Award for Fiction 2013.

== Editions ==
There are currently four editions of the novel: hardcover, e-book, audio, and a paperback version released on March 10, 2015.

== Adaptation ==
Sony Pictures was in the development stage of creating a film adaptation to the novel and the release for the film has not been announced. Sony has hired Edgar Wright as the director and Scott Rosenberg as a screenwriter. They have also brought in Nira Park and Matt Tolmach to help Rosenberg in producing the film. On April 12, 2017, New Regency was in talks to pick up the project.
