= East (novel) =

2003 novel by Edith Pattou

- Author: Edith Pattou
- Original title: East
- Language: English
- Genre: Novel
- Publication date: 2003
- Media type: Print (hardback & paperback)
- OCLC: 23384749
- Followed by: West

East (known as North Child in the UK and Australia) is a 2003 young adult novel by Edith Pattou. It is an adaptation of an old Norwegian folk tale entitled "East of the Sun and West of the Moon" and was a 2003 ALA Top Ten Best Book for Young Adults. West, a sequel to East, was published in October 2018.

== Plot ==
When Arne married the superstitious Eugenia, he agreed to have seven children with her—one for each point of the compass, excluding north. According to the birth-direction superstition held by Eugenia's family, the direction a woman faces when giving birth will affect the child's personality; each direction foretells a different personality, and Eugenia believes north is wild and uncontrollable. Years before, Eugenia was told by a skjebne-soke (a fortune teller) that any north child she had would die crushed beneath an avalanche of ice and snow, reinforcing her desire to never have a pure northern child. Her favorite child, east-born Elise, dies young and Eugenia conceives another child to replace her, Rose. While pregnant with Rose, Eugenia is adamant that her unborn child will be an east-born, so much so that her very non-superstitious husband worries that she is tempting fate.

Rose feels out of place in her family, despite her love for them and her home; she can never live up to the standard set by her dead sister Elise, and is consumed by un-east-like wanderlust and desire for adventure. Her happy and loving childhood is failing: not only are they impoverished and her sick sister lying close to death, but her parents have concealed the truth of her birth-direction from her—the superstition that has hung over her entire life. Later she overhears her parents talking and finds out she is actually a north-born.

So when an enormous white bear mysteriously shows up and asks her to come away with him, in exchange for health and prosperity for her ailing family, she readily agrees. The bear takes Rose to a distant castle hidden within a mountain, where each night she is confronted with a mystery. Every night she sleeps with an unknown being that she cannot see but she can hear shivering. She also makes friend with a being named Tuki the son of the cook who teaches her some of his language.

When Rose gets homesick the white bear takes her home where she is allowed to stay for one month as long as she doesn't tell her family about her experiences with the white bear especially her mother. After a while, she tells her brother Neddy about the unknown figure in her bed and her mother overhears. When she leaves her mother gives a candle that will always light even if a strong wind is blowing.

The white bear takes her back to the castle and all is well until Rose's curiosity gets the better of her and she lights the candle. She sees that the being with her is a man. The man wakes up and screams. He tells her that he was the white bear and he could have been free if a maiden stayed with him willingly for a year without looking at his human face.

Because the man/bear failed to break his curse within a year, the troll queen who placed him under the curse comes to take him to her castle "east of the sun and west of the moon," where he will be her prisoner. Rose knows that she must save him and embarks on a quest to find the troll kingdom. On her long journey, she encounters many different people and dangerous situations.

== Reception ==
East has received mixed reviews. Kirkus Reviews stated "Using multiple narrators, Pattou expands the Scandinavian folktale "East of the Sun and West of the Moon" to epic length—adding little to the original." and "... the pace does pick up in the second half—but only fitfully does this achieve the intensity of feeling or vividness of setting that drives the best of the recent flurry of retold romances." while Publishers Weekly saw that "Readers with a taste for fantasy and folklore will embrace Pattou's (Hero's Song) lushly rendered retelling of "East of the Sun and West of the Moon." and "Handsomely evoking a landscape filled with castles, trolls, shamans and spellbound princes, the story will exercise its audience's imagination." Inis magazine was critical writing that "Pattou has replaced the conciseness of the folktale form (her novel makes use of 'East of the Sun, West of the Moon') with a detail-oriented kind of epic exoticism, and more has been lost than gained in the exchange. This novel bludgeons the folktale into an overly rationalistic, epic narrative form that relies on exoticism for its appeal and has no meaningful historical or geographical accuracy. The novel is targeted at girls aged 12+. Its lengthiness could discourage reluctant readers while its fundamental weaknesses may irritate stronger readers."
