= Andrew A. Smith =

American young adult writer (born 1959)

- Born: Andrew Anselmo Smith; July 16, 1959 (age 67); California, U.S.
- Education: California State University Northridge
- Occupations: Author; educator
- Writing career
- Years active: 2008–present
- Genre: Young Adult Fiction
- Notable works: Winger; Grasshopper Jungle
- Notable awards: Boston Globe-Horn Book Award
- Website: AuthorAndrewSmith.com

Andrew Anselmo Smith (born July 16, 1959) is an American author and short story writer in the young adult fiction genre. He has written ten novels including Winger and Grasshopper Jungle, which is currently being adapted into a movie. Smith is known for his dark subject matter, and his randomized writing style.

== Early life ==
Andrew Smith was born in California, on July 16, 1959. He decided to pursue a career as a writer because he was the editor of his high school newspaper. He traveled around the world and worked in various jobs such as working in metal mills, as a longshoreman, in bars and liquor stores, in security, and as a musician. After graduating from college, he tried pursuing careers as a journalist, writing for newspapers, and writing radio stations, but he felt it wasn't the kind of writing that he wanted to do for the rest of his life. After much traveling around the world, Smith finally settled for a job as a high school teacher. He taught advanced placement classes and coached a rugby team. The writing that he was doing on the side was never for publication; he would write for fun until he was challenged by one of his lifelong friends to get one of his books published. In 2008, his first novel, Ghost Medicine, was published, followed by several more novels including Grasshopper Jungle and The Alex Crow.

== Personal life ==
He is currently married, has two children, and teaches government, US history, and economics at Canyon High School in Santa Clarita, California. Smith's novel Grasshopper Jungle was never meant to be published, as he had decided to quit writing for others, but his son urged him to publish it.

== Awards ==
Andrew Smith has received several awards for his many books. His novel Marbury Lens has received a Young Adult Library Services Association Best For Young Adults award, the Booklist Editor's Choice 2010 award, and was named Publishers Weekly Best Children's Book of the Year for 2010. His novel Winger was given an Amazon Best of the Year award and received an American Library Association Top 10 for 2014. Winger was also rated as one of Publishers Weekly Best Books of 2013 and Publishers Weekly Top 10 Summer Reads of 2013, was given a Junior Library Guild Selection for 2013, and was a 2014 Rainbow List Nominee. His novel In the Path of Falling Objects received the Best Book For Young Adults Award. His novel Grasshopper Jungle has been awarded the 2014 Boston Globe-Horn Book Award and was a 2015 Michael Printz Honor Book.

- 2014 California Book Awards Young Adult Finalist for 100 Sideways Miles

== Works ==
=== Marbury Lens series ===
- The Marbury Lens (2010) According to WorldCat, the book is held in 1022 libraries.
- King of Marbury (2012, book 1.5)
- Passenger (2012) According to WorldCat, the book is held in 666 libraries.

=== Winger ===
- Winger (2013) According to WorldCat, the book is held in 1268 libraries
- Stand-Off (2015)

=== Sam Abernathy ===
- The Size of the Truth (2019)
- Bye-Bye, Blue Creek (2020)

=== Grasshopper Jungle ===
- Grasshopper Jungle (2014) According to WorldCat, the book is held in 1110 libraries. A Printz Award Honor Book, 2015
- Exile from Eden (2019)

=== Other works ===
- Ghost Medicine (2008) According to WorldCat, the book is held in 874 libraries.
- In the Path of Falling Objects (2009) According to WorldCat, the book is held in 653 libraries.
- Stick (2011) According to WorldCat, the book is held in 688 libraries.
- 100 Sideways Miles (2014)
- The Alex Crow (2015) Reviewed in the New York Times
- "Julian Breaks Every Rule" in Because You Love to Hate Me: 13 Tales of Villainy (2017)
- Rabbit & Robot (2018) Starred review from Publishers Weekly
