= Red Midnight =

- Author: Ben Mikaelsen
- Cover artist: Cliff Nielsen
- Language: English
- Genre: Historical novel
- Publisher: HarperCollins
- Publication date: 2002
- Publication place: United States
- Media type: Print Paperback
- Pages: 212 pp (paperback)
- ISBN: 0-380-80561-8
- OCLC: 48032750

Red Midnight is a 2002 novel written by Ben Mikaelsen. It is set in Guatemala in spring of 1981.

It won the Nevada Young Readers' Award (Intermediate Category) in 2005.

It is about a boy who loses most of his family and uses his uncle's hand made cayuco to sail from Guatemala to the United States to be free and tell his story.

== Plot summary ==
12-year-old Santiago Cruz, a Kekcíhi campesinos indigenous, escapes from his destroyed village, Dos Vías, Guatemala, on May 18, 1981, with his four-year-old sister, Angelina, at midnight, after his mother pushes her into his arms and wakes him up. His entire family has been killed by soldiers, and he runs as far away as he can. His Uncle Ramos gives him a map and compass and instructs him to sail away in his cayuco to the United States, to escape the civil war and hopefully find a better life. The boy and his sister (Angelina) find a horse and ride it into the nearby village of Los Santos, where everyone has also been killed and burned. They continue into a city and sneak a ride in a maize truck. They then sneak a ride on the back of a manure truck that a drunk rebel soldier is driving. To keep the truck from crashing because of the intoxicated driver, they put horse dung into the gas tank and escape when the truck breaks down. They then walk down to Lake Izabal and sleep at their Uncle Ramos's house. In the morning, Enrique, a friend of Ramos, finds the children. They tell him what has happened, and Enrique and his wife, Silvia, give them food for the journey. Enrique tells them everything he knows about the dangerous journey, and ride in the cayuco with them until they reach the opening to the sea. At the entrance to El Golfete, they sneak beside the shore past a military boat. Enrique leaves and Santiago and his sister sail into the ocean. They have little food, and soon go hungry and thirsty, with itches and blisters all over their bodies. They encounter tourists, pirates, many violent storms, and a shark. They encounter a river of garbage, which Santiago uses to make an amateur windshield among other spare parts to fix his cayuco, and finds Angelina a broken plastic doll. They once nearly sailed into an inland bay on the border of Belize and Mexico, and then sailed into the open Gulf. Santiago makes notches in his cayuco every dawn with his machete, as it should only take twenty to make it. They attempt to catch fish, but often fail or have to steal fish from fishing nets from a ship. They encounter a large storm, which causes the mast to fall directly on Santiago's head, and makes them lose the water pail. They experience diarrhea and sores, and almost lose hope of making the journey. They had expected to arrive in twenty days, but several more pass with no land in sight. One day, a tropical storm's eye passes over them, and they lose everything except the cayuco. As the storm passes, they land in a large city in Florida and are taken to a hospital. They tell a nurse who can speak Spanish about their journey. They are bandaged, Angelina's doll is fixed, and they are shown on television and are fed food. They are told they will not be deported because they are children and the media has widely publicized how they have suffered so much.

== Reception ==
Kirkus Reviews praised the characterisation and called the novel a "gripping tale of overcoming dangers". In a review of the audiobook read by Chris Nunez, Connie Rockman of Booklist wrote that Nunez "brings out every nuance of emotion as the boy struggles to fulfill a man's role against all odds in this gripping tale of hope and survival." Colleen M. Fairbanks of The ALAN Review wrote that the novel is "often gripping" and that readers "will appreciate his determination and resourcefulness in the face of great danger", although they "may find the occasional heavy-handed political commentary intrusive."
