= Hope Was Here =

2000 novel by Joan Bauer

- First edition
- Author: Joan Bauer
- Genre: Young adult novel
- Published: 2000 G. P. Putnam's Sons
- Publication place: United States
- Media type: Print (Hardback & Paperback), Compact Disc, Book on Tape
- Pages: 186 pp (Paperback edition)
- ISBN: 0-14-240424-1
- OCLC: 60590789

Hope Was Here is a 2000 novel by Joan Bauer. It was declared a Newbery Honor Book in 2001. The audiobook read by Jenna Lamia won the AudioFile Earphones Award. In 2001 won the award Best Books for Young Adults from American Library Association (ALA).

== Synopsis ==
Hope Yancey is a teenage waitress living with her aunt Addie in Brooklyn, where Addie works as a chef at "The Blue Box Diner". Hope's birth mother, Deena, deemed herself unfit for parenting and gave Hope to Addie rather than raise her on her own. Hope doesn't know who her birth father is. When "The Blue Box Diner" closes down because the owner stole all of the restaurant's money from the cash register roll, Addie decides to move to Mulhoney, a small city in Wisconsin, where she and Hope can work at the small-town diner "Welcome Stairways". Hope's new boss, G.T. Stoop, is a kind-hearted man whose leukemia prevents him from working full-time at his diner. After witnessing the political corruption within Mulhoney, G.T. decided to run for mayor against the incumbent candidate, Eli Millstone. Millstone has several illegal agreements with the large corporate Real Fresh Dairy, and in exchange has the workers support his campaign. Encouraged by G.T.'s integrity and bravery to stand up to the corrupt Millstone, a group of students from the local high school form an organization to support G.T.'s campaign. This group includes Hope and the "Welcome Stairways" line cook Eddie Braverman. Because of Braverman's participation, he is attacked and beaten by a group of Millstone's supporters.

While G.T. campaigns against Millstone, Addie tries to improve the diner to match her exacting standards. G.T. shows romantic interest in Addie, who responds positively but brusquely. Encouraged by G.T.'s success with Addie, Braverman decides to ask Hope out. Hope refuses at first, wary because Deena has always told her to never date cooks. However, after a date, Hope and Braverman become a couple after their kiss. Hope also befriends Flo and Lou Ellen, the two other waitresses at "Welcome Stairways", along with Yuri, the Russian busboy. Lou Ellen has a baby daughter, Anastasia, who is maturing a little slower than normal. Hope and the rest of the "Welcome Stairways" staff decide to help Lou Ellen by caring for Anastasia.

During his campaign, G.T. discovers that his leukemia is in remission, but Millstone's campaign spreads a rumor that G.T.'s cancer has spread to his brain. The teens, Addie, G.T. and the deputy sheriff Brenda Babcock all attempt to spread the truth about G.T., but they are unable to convince the townspeople in time, and G.T. loses the election.

A few weeks later, Hope and Braverman discover that Millstone rigged the election when they notice that some of the people listed as voters are not actually registered to vote. G.T. is named the new mayor of Mulhoney and begins many reform programs. He marries Addie and officially adopts Hope. Unfortunately, about two years later, leukemia returns. Before he dies, Hope tells G.T. that she thinks of him as her real father, the one that she had always been looking for. G.T.'s death devastates Mulhoney, but eventually, Hope is able to come to terms with her loss and appreciate that she has found a stable home at "Welcome Stairways".

== Awards ==
- Newbery Honor, 2001
- Young Reader's Choice Award, 2003
- ALA Notable Book
- ALA best Book for Young Adults
