= Joan Bauer (novelist) =

American children's writer

- Born: July 12, 1951 (age 75); River Forest, Illinois, U.S.
- Occupation: Author of young adult fiction
- Spouse: Evan Bauer
- Children: 1

Joan Baehler Bauer (born July 12, 1951) is an American writer of young adult literature currently residing with her husband Evan Bauer in Brooklyn. Bauer was born in River Forest, Illinois. They are the parents of one daughter, Jean. Before becoming a famous author Joan spent years working for McGraw-Hill and the Chicago Tribune. She also did some work in advertising, marketing, and screenwriting.

== Themes ==
The main characters in her books are typically teenagers who are dealing with complicated family issues, such as alcoholism, abandonment, illness, and self-esteem issues. These issues are lightened up with a light touch and humor. Bauer is well known for her enjoyable young adult fiction novels, which always feature bright covers with her name in mismatched colored letters.

== Awards ==
She has received multiple awards and recognition for her work including: Delacorte Prize for First Young Adult Novel, 1992, for Squashed; Top Ten Best Books for Young Adults selection, American Library Association, 1999, for Rules of the Road; Newbery Honor Medal; Los Angeles Times Book Prize; Christopher Award; Golden Kite Award, Society of Children's Book Writers and Illustrators; Michigan Thumbs-Up! Award for Children's Literature; New England Booksellers Award; Literary Light Award, Boston Public Library.

== Notable works ==
=== Squashed ===
Bauer's first book, Squashed, was set in rural Iowa. The novel features a sixteen-year-old named Ellie Morgan, whose life "would be almost perfect if she could just get her potentially prize-winning pumpkin to put on about 200 more pounds—and if she could take off 20 herself ... in hopes of attracting Wes, the new boy in town." The novel was published in 1992 by Delacorte Press, a Dell Publishing imprint. According to Delacorte, Squashed won its annual Prize for an Outstanding First Young Adult Novel.

=== Hope Was Here ===
The novel Hope Was Here was published by G. P. Putnam's Sons in 2000. The novel was one of four Newbery Honor Books, and runner-up for the 2001 Newbery Medal. The American Library Association award recognizes the year's most distinguished contribution to American children's literature; a distinct award for young-adult books had been introduced in 2000, the Michael L. Printz Award. Hope Was Here features Hope Yancey, a 16-year-old waitress in small-town Wisconsin. According to the Newbery Committee chair, "Bauer juggles story lines as well as Hope juggles plates, and the lessons of waitressing expand into lessons about the essentials of life."

=== Thwonk ===
Thwonk was published in 1996 by Bantam books. The novel features A.J. McCreary and her love interest Peter Terris. She encounters a real-life cupid who can only help her in one aspect of her life: either romantically, academically, or artistically. She knows she should use the wish to get into a prestigious art school but she has been obsessed with Peter for months which complicates her situation.

=== Peeled ===
Peeled was published in 2008 by Putnam Juvenile. The novel follows Hildy Biddle. She dreams of being a journalist. She writes for her school newspaper and is drawn to a haunted house in her town for a story. That is where her journey begins. There have been reported ghost sightings and the town is intrigued. Hidly is determined to get the big story no matter what the consequences.

== Books ==
- Squashed (Delacorte Press, 1992)
- Thwonk (Delacorte, 1995) – a young-adult fantasy novel
- Sticks (Delacorte, 1996)
- Rules of the Road (G. P. Putnam's Sons, 1998) – Golden Kite Award, LA Times Book Prize
- Backwater (Putnam, 1999)
- Hope Was Here (Putnam, 2000) – a Newbery Honor Book
- Stand Tall (Putnam, 2002)
- Best Foot Forward (Putnam, 2005)
- Peeled (Putnam, 2008)
- Close to Famous (Vikings, 2011)
- Almost Home (Viking, 2012)
- Soar ( Jan, 2016)
- Tell Me (Viking, 2014)
