= Winger (novel) =

Young adult novel by Andrew Smith

- First edition cover of Winger.
- Author: Andrew Smith
- Language: English
- Series: Winger
- Genre: Young adult fiction
- Publisher: Simon & Schuster
- Publication date: May 14, 2013
- Publication place: United States
- Media type: Paperback
- Pages: 440
- ISBN: 9781442444928
- Followed by: Stand-Off

Winger (2013) is a young adult novel written by American author Andrew A. Smith. Smith's sixth young adult novel, it has gotten mostly favorable reviews.

== Premise ==
At a prestigious boarding school, Pine Mountain, Oregon, fourteen-year-old Ryan Dean West as he recounts events experienced in his journey of maturation. Winger

== Synopsis ==
Ryan is assigned a room with Chas Becker, a senior whom he despises. After being invited to play a poker game by Chas, Ryan Dean's former roommates JP and Seanie warn him that losing will bring a penalty. After losing, Ryan Dean is forced by Chas to drink alcohol for the first time. Finding out about him getting drunk in school, another student (Annie) becomes upset with Ryan. He apologizes and they meet at Stonehenge, a circle of stones in a clearing of the forest with which Annie believes you can make a wish whenever going in. When walking back out of the path of Stonehenge, Ryan reveals his wish to have her realize that although he is fourteen, he is just as good for her as any other one of the boys at PM and she regretfully reveals her wish was for his wish to come true.

After his very first study session with Chas' girlfriend, Megan, the two begin secretly kissing and flirting with each other. JP informs Ryan Dean of Annie being his date to the upcoming Halloween dinner, this news sparking jealousy in Ryan Dean. When playing a resistance drill he takes out his anger and frustration on JP, but is left with a large cut above his eyebrow when JP retaliates. Ryan Dean then flies to Seattle with Annie to stay with her and her family for the weekend. During this time, Megan and Ryan Dean's relationship becomes questionable for Chas resulting in a confrontation between the two. Joey comes to Ryan Dean's defense and warns Chas off. After a game against Sacred Heart, Kevin is stabbed in the shoulder by one of four scrubs who were seeking Joey. Joey reveals to Ryan Dean that the stabber's name was Mike and that he had dated Mike's brother. After Mike's brother was sent away for being gay, his brother threatened to come after Joey. Ryan Dean believes it was this particular moment when he and Joey truly became best friends.

While in Seattle, Ryan Dean and Annie discover an abandoned sawmill. Annie shows Ryan Dean a painting on the wall she had found of two overlapping circles and the word "someday," which reminded her of the wish he had made at Stonehenge. They share their first kiss. On the last day in Seattle, Ryan Dean and Annie run into the woods in the pouring rain, and when Ryan Dean attempts to kiss her again, she asks that he does not, and tells him she can't love him. Ryan Dean becomes distant with Annie because of this, but she kisses him yet again once they arrive at the airport which makes Ryan Dean feel as if he is going insane because of Annie's indecisiveness. On the car ride back to Pine Mountain it is evident that there is a love triangle with Ryan Dean sitting right in the middle of it, with Megan sneakily playing with Ryan Dean's foot while Annie held his hand.

At midnight, Ryan Dean plays his second round of poker with Chas, Joey, Kevin, and Casey, and the boys take shots of whiskey. He and Chas lose and must take up "the consequence." Casey assigns the boys the task of driving to buy costumes for all five of the players, so Joey decides to be the designated driver since Ryan and Chas are both drunk. During the trip, Chas demands Ryan Dean tell him what is going on with him and Megan with which he confesses that they have kissed a few times. Saddened by the news, Chas leaves. While Joey and Ryan Dean are alone, Ryan Dean asks why Joey doesn't have a boyfriend, and he responds that he does, in fact, have a boyfriend, but keeps it private at school as it would cause too much trouble. He also reveals that Casey Palmer is secretly gay and wants to be with him. After the boys find Halloween costumes, they find Chas on the way back to Pine Mountain. That morning, Ryan Dean tells Megan that they can no longer continue to see each other, given his concern for Annie's feelings, which causes Megan to cry.

Ryan Dean finally has his stitches removed and arranges a date with Annie at Stonehenge. Once at Stonehenge, Annie reminds Ryan Dean that she can't be in love with him, but he convinces her otherwise. Joey, however, remains Ryan Deans closest friend. On his way back to his room, Ryan Dean runs into Casey and Nick, who accuse him of being gay and make him aware of how much they'd like to fight him. Although Ryan Dean wants to reveal Casey's secret, he knows it would not be in his best interest to do so.

Ryan Dean and the O-Hall boys attend Pine Mountain's Halloween party. He apologizes to Megan and Chas and Megan accepts and reveals she is in love with him. Ryan then sees an upset Joey who announced in front of other people that Casey needed to hit on another gay student at Pine Mountain. Joey tells Ryan Dean that he, Annie and Kevin are his true friends. Ryan Dean returns to a dark and eerie dormitory where he encounters a drunken Casey threatening to kill him.

The morning after the dance, Ryan Dean realizes that Joey had not been present for his classes. Kevin remarks that Joey hadn't come home after the party, but his car was still at the school's lot. He also reveals that Nick and Casey had gotten into a fight with Joey. Ryan Dean informs officers of Joey's disappearance after the previous night. The next morning, many police officers, park rangers, and staff begin searching for Joey, and Chas and Ryan Dean decide to help with the search. Later that afternoon, Joey was found dead in the woods. Following his death, the dormitory was sealed off. Ryan Dean notes that he stopped talking after Joey's death, with the exception of whispering to Annie when he needed to. His parents thought it'd be best to remove him from Pine Mountain, but he felt otherwise as he did not want to be away from Annie. Ryan Dean and Chas become close friends and Kevin becomes somewhat of a peacemaker between the two of them. Ryan Dean thinks about how he'd been on a journey of "reinventing" himself throughout the entirety of the novel, and realizes that when you grow up, instead of sex, almost everything is about love.

== Characters ==
Ryan Dean Mario West (Winger)- Narrator and protagonist of the novel, Ryan Dean is known as "Winger" because of his position as a wing on his varsity rugby team. He thinks of himself as a loser. Ryan Dean develops into a man by becoming more happy with himself as the story progresses.

Joey Cosentino- A senior at Pine Mountain, Joey is Ryan Dean's very best friend, and plays fly half for the varsity rugby team. Despite Joey's homosexuality, Ryan Dean trusts Joey and his sexuality does not faze him.

Annie Altman- Ryan Dean's girlfriend, two years older than him. Annie is the first person he met at Pine Mountain. She thinks Ryan is the smartest and best-looking boy at Pine Mountain.

Chas Becker (Betch)- A senior at Pine Mountain, and Ryan Dean's roommate in O-Hall. He is a great athlete but a colossal jerk. Although he and Ryan Dean are not so fond of each other, the two gradually become friends.

John-Paul Tureau (JP)-JP is popular and smart and is known for going from girl to girl at Pine Mountain. He is Ryan Dean's former best friend and roommate and holds the position of fullback on the rugby team. Annie is the reason for the deteriorating of he and Ryan Deans' friendship.

Sean Flaherty (Seanie)- One of Ryan Dean's former roommates for his first two years at Pine Mountain, and rugby teammate. He plays the position of scrum-half. His friendship with Ryan Dean is affected through the confrontations between Ryan Dean and his roommate, JP.

Megan Renshaw- Chas' girlfriend, who Ryan Dean finds to be extremely intimidating and sexy. She, Ryan and Joey form a calculus study group. She develops a relationship with Ryan Dean, who sees her as more accessible than Annie.

Casey Palmer- Casey is a bully at Pine Mountain.

Nick Matthews- Casey's roommate, also a violent bully. Nick has a tattoo of a skull on his shoulder and shows his disdain for "queers" whenever mentioned. He makes Ryan Dean aware that he and Casey were planning on hurting him and Joey.

== Style and themes ==
=== Metanarrative style ===
Winger is a framed metanarrative novel as the text is the protagonists' story within various past events that make the stories connect. Throughout the novel, protagonist Ryan Dean recalls events and his conversations with others in a somewhat vague manner.

=== Graphic style ===
Because of Ryan's Dean's passion for drawing, he inserts a collection of comics into each chapter, visualizing various events that he previously experienced. These comics correlate to the visual Venn diagrams that Ryan Dean uses in order to tell elements of his story more clearly.

=== Gender themes ===
Smith makes readers aware of the disconnection between men and women through Ryan Dean's relationship with Annie, Megan, and his own mother, and how this differs greatly with his ability to easily understand all of his male friends on his rugby team. Since Ryan Dean is only fourteen-years-old in a class of students two years older than himself, he struggles with emerging from a little boy into a man, so he is easily influenced by the male characters in the novel and continuously attempts to identify with them so as to fit in. However, such "manliness" is challenged by the females in the story whom all establish a sense of power over Ryan Dean.

== Reception ==
- "Ryan Dean narrates his misadventures in a witty, erudite, profanity-laced voice that reveals exactly how much a fourteen-year-old boy can be preoccupied with hot sex, fitting in, hot sex, sports, and hot sex. The book's brutally violent conclusion comes out of nowhere to deliver on the flap copy's promise that something "unthinkable" is going to happen—an ending that will bring tears to some readers while striking others as a gratuitous attempt to wring meaning from one boy's amusing sex fantasies.", Claudia Mills, Children's Literature
- A.J. Jacobs, writing for The New York Times found Winger " ... Smith's funniest book by far", and "...amusing and touching in a "Looking for Alaska" meets Rabelais meets "Friday Night Lights" kind of way."
- Kirkus Reviews called it a " ... smart, wickedly funny work of realistic fiction".

== Sources ==
- Matos, Angel. "Unrealistic Expectations: (Meta)Narrative in Andrew Smith’s 'Winger'"
- Smith, Andrew. Winger, Simon & Schuster Books for Young Readers, New York, ISBN 978-1-4424-4492-8
