= Petey (novel) =

1998 children's novel by Ben Mikaelsen

- Author: Ben Mikaelsen
- Language: English
- Genre: Children's novel
- Published: 1998-09-15 (Little, Brown)
- Publication place: United States
- Media type: Print
- Pages: 281 pp
- ISBN: 978-0-7868-0426-9
- OCLC: 38391184
- LC Class: PZ7.M5926 Pg 1998

Petey (1998) is a children's novel by Ben Mikaelsen, published in 1998 and set in the 1920s and 1990s.

Based on the real-life story of cerebral palsy patient Clyde Cothern, Petey illustrates for children an understanding of people with disabilities, and helps them to discover what these people go through. Re-occurring themes include growth, understanding, wisdom and love that shows that beauty and friendship can be found inside the simplest things.

== Plot summary ==
In the 1920s, at a hospital in Bozeman, Montana, a boy named Petey Corbin is born with cerebral palsy to Sarah Corbin. The doctor diagnoses him as physically and mentally disabled, unable to walk or talk and has no capacity for thought. Devastated, Sarah and her husband spend two years and enormous sums of money going to doctors, but each tells them to send Petey to an institution. The Corbins decide to send him to a psychiatric hospital, although called an insane asylum (in 1922), in Warm Springs, Montana.

The story's point of view then shifts to Petey, following his life in the hospital. The nurses in the crowded and unsanitary institution care for him lazily and improperly, some even abusing him. A new male nurse named Esteban quickly befriends Petey. Whenever he can, Esteban talks to Petey and brings him chocolate, as Petey is "his favorite". Esteban understands (unlike most people) that Petey is not mentally disabled, but that it is only his body that is deformed. Esteban is discharged for informing civic leaders from Butte that Petey isn't, in fact, retarded.

At the age of eleven, Petey is transferred to the Men's Ward. He is put in a large room with several bigger men. Soon after, he notices a family of mice living in his room. They are his only joy until a new person, named Calvin, moves into Petey's room. Mildly mentally challenged and club-footed, Calvin quickly becomes Petey's best friend, and the two spend all their time together. Petey and Calvin meet many people in the Warm Springs Insane Asylum including Joe, Cassie, and Owen, however they all leave them at different points in time. Eventually, many patients are moved to different facilities. Petey and Calvin are separated when Calvin is taken to a nursing home. Months later, Peter is also transferred to a nursing home. The story then proceeds to travel several years later.

In 1990, outside, he is getting bullied by teens. They are throwing snow balls at Petey. But another teen, Trevor, gets in and stops the bullies. Trevor also gets Petey a new wheelchair and takes him out. Eventually, though, Petey becomes ill and his health declines. Trevor visits him in the hospital as much as possible and asks Petey to be his symbolic grandfather because of the great impact Petey has made in his life. As Petey dies in the hospital, he communicates that Trevor should go and live his life. As the story draws to a close, Trevor says goodbye to his "Grandpa Petey" as Petey dies with dignity.

== Reception ==
Joel Shoemaker of the School Library Journal wrote Mikaelsen "successfully conveys Petey's strangled attempts to communicate", "captures the slow passage of time, the historical landscape encompassed" and "brings emotions to the surface and tears to readers' eyes as time and again Petey suffers the loss of friends he has grown to love." Kirkus Reviews wrote that "despite some overly sentimentalized passages, the message comes through that every being deserves care, respect, and a chance to make a difference." Publishers Weekly criticised the characterisation, writing that the characters "never really come to life beyond their roles as symbols", and wrote that the novel "never meets the promise of its compelling premise."
