= Chris Lynch =

American writer of books for young people

- Born: July 2, 1962 (age 64); Boston
- Education: Emerson College
- Occupations: Author and teacher
- Writing career
- Language: English
- Genre: Books for young people

Chris Lynch (born July 2, 1962) is an American writer of books for young people. His works include Inexcusable, a finalist for the U.S. National Book Award for Young People's Literature, and Iceman, The Right Fight, Shadow Boxer, Gold Dust and Slot Machine, all ALA Best Books for Young Adults; Freewill was also a runner-up for the Michael L. Printz Award. Some of his works are intended for a high school level audience; some for children and younger teenagers.

His short story "The Pellet in the Paint Can" has been included in the collection Guys Write for Guys Read. (New York: Viking, 2005), and "Arrangements" was included in No Such Thing as the Real World (HarperCollins, 2009 ISBN 978-0-06-147058-5).

Lynch was born in Boston where he graduated from Emerson College and teaches Creative Writing at Lesley University as of 2011.

== Books ==
=== Standalone works ===
- Pieces (Simon & Schuster Books for Young Readers, 2013)
- The Big Game of Everything (Harper Teen, 2008)
- Me, dead Dad and Alcatraz (HarperCollins, 2005, ISBN 978-0-06-059710-8)
  - Reviewed in School Library Journal and Booklist
- Sins of the Fathers (Harper Tempest, 2006)
- Inexcusable (Atheneum Books for Young Readers, 2005)
  - Korean translation: 용서할수없는 / Yongsŏ halsu ŏmnŭn (메타포, Sŏul-si : Metʻapʻo, 2008.)
- The gravedigger's cottage 2005
- Who the man 2002
- All the old haunts 2001
- Freewill (Harper Teen, 2001, ISBN 978-0-06-447202-9)
  - Reviews: Horn Book, Chicago Tribune, Kirkus Reviews
  - German translation: Nenn es wie du willst (Hamburg : Carlsen, 2003)
- Gold dust 2000
- Extreme Elvin 1999
- Whitechurch 1999
- Mick and Dog eat dog 1996
- Blood relations 1996
- Political timber 1996
- Slot Machine 1995
- Iceman 1994
- Gypsy Davey 1994
  - Italian translation: Davey il vagabond (Milano : Mondadori, 2001)
- Shadow Boxer 1993

=== He-Man Women Hater's Club series ===
1. Johnny Chesthair (1997)
2. Ladies Choice (1997)
3. Scratch and the Sniffs (1997)
4. Babes in the Woods (1997)
5. The Wolf Gang (1998)

=== Cyberia series ===
1. Cyberia (Scholastic Press, 2008, ISBN 978-0-545-02793-9)
2. Monkey See, Monkey Don't (Scholastic Press, 2009 ISBN 978-0-545-02794-6)

=== Vietnam series ===
1. Vietnam: I Pledge Allegiance (2011)
2. Vietnam: Sharpshooter (2012)
3. Vietnam: Free-Fire Zone (2012)
4. Vietnam: Casualties Of War (2013)
5. Vietnam: Walking Wounded (2014)

=== World War II series ===
1. World War II: The Right Fight (2013)
2. World War II: Dead In the Water (2013)
3. World War II: Alive And Kicking (2014)
4. World War II: The Liberators (2015)
