= Junauda Petrus =

US author, filmmaker, performance artist, and pleasure activist

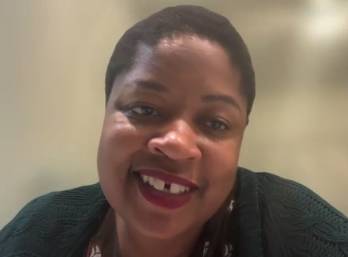
- Born: Minneapolis, Minnesota, U.S.
- Occupation: Author, filmmaker
- Genre: Young adult fiction
- Notable awards: Coretta Scott King Honor Award (2020)

Junauda Juanita Petrus is an American author, filmmaker, performance artist, "pleasure activist", and Poet Laureate. Her debut novel, The Stars and the Blackness Between Them, was a winner of a Coretta Scott King Honor Award.

== Early life ==
Petrus was born on Dakota land in Minneapolis, Minnesota. She is of Afro-Caribbean descent. Her mother was born in Trinidad and her father in US Virgin Islands and later moved to Minnesota. She was one of four daughters born to her mother and father; her father has a total of eleven children from five mothers.

As a child, Petrus wanted to be an astronaut and enjoyed reading V. C. Andrews, Maya Angelou, Langston Hughes, Anne Rice, and Alice Walker. She came out as gay to her family at age 30 and met her wife, a native of Cameroon, four years later.

Petrus holds a degree in Social Justice and the African Diaspora from Hamline University. After graduation, she trained at the Alvin Ailey American Dance Theater, and at a circus school in Vermont, before moving back to Minnesota.

== Career ==
Petrus' piece There Are Other Worlds was performed at Intermedia Arts in 2015. She and Erik Ehn co-wrote Queen, which was performed at In the Heart of the Beast Puppet and Mask Theatre in 2016. Queen was partly inspired by Petrus' 2015 poem "Could we please give the police departments to the grandmothers?" This poem was contributed to the anthology How I Resist: Activism and Hope for a New Generation by Maureen Johnson, which was released in 2018. A picture book based on the poem, titled Can We Please Give the Police Department to the Grandmothers?, was released in 2023.

In 2016, Petrus was commissioned by the City of Minneapolis to write three poems for a public art project on Nicollet Mall in Downtown Minneapolis; one poem was censored and she was asked to submit another poem.

Her 2019 novel, The Stars and the Blackness Between Them, is a coming of age story of two 16-year-old queer black girls in Minneapolis. The book has been the target of book bans. In February 2021, Petrus announced that she was working on a film adaptation of the novel.

In the wake of the murder of George Floyd, Petrus wrote a short prose piece entitled "Sweetness for George".

Petrus' works incorporate themes such as black diasporic futurism, female friendships, queerness, black community, identity, and healing. She is inspired by her mother, Al Green, nature, and women.

Petrus is an affiliated writer of The Playwrights' Center in Minneapolis. Along with Erin Sharkey, she co-founded the group Free Black Dirt, a collective of writers and creators who seek to "spark and engage in critical conversations". The group organizes events to showcase original performance and theatre works by emerging artists.

Petrus describes herself as a "pleasure activist"; she claims her art has "healing power" and relates to themes involving desire and pleasure. She has written about her pleasure activist work in Adrienne Maree Brown's book Pleasure Activism: The Politics of Feeling Good, which explains pleasure activism as making social justice work "the most pleasurable human experience."

== Awards ==
Petrus was recognized as a City Pages Twin Cities artist of the year in 2016.

In 2020, Petrus received a Coretta Scott King Honor Award for The Stars and the Blackness Between Them.

In 2025, Petrus was nominated for a Minnesota Book Award in Children's Literature for Can We Please Give the Police Department to the Grandmothers?

Petrus has also been awarded several fellowships. She is the 2025–2026 City of Minneapolis Poet Laureate.
