= St Mark's Eve =

24th April

- Significance: Day before the feast day of St. Mark the Evangelist
- Date: 24 April
- Next time: 24 April 2026
- Frequency: Annual
- Related to: feast of St. Mark

St. Mark's Eve is the day before the feast day of St. Mark the Evangelist. In liturgical Christian churches, this feast of St. Mark is observed on 25 April of each year; thus St. Mark's Eve is 24 April.

== English folklore ==
It was the custom in villages in England, from the 17th century to the late 19th century, to sit in the church porch on St. Mark's Eve. Those sitting had to keep silent between the bell tolling at 11.00 p.m. until the bell struck 1.00 a.m. It was said that the spirits of those to die during the year would be witnessed passing into the church. In Yorkshire it was necessary to keep vigil for three successive nights. On the third such sitting, the fetch of those to die would be seen passing into the church. This practice was most prevalent in northern and western counties. Records from 1608 show a woman in Nottinghamshire was censured by her church for participating in St. Mark's Eve.

Some accounts of the custom state that the watchers must be fasting, or must circle the church before taking up position. The ghosts of those who were to die soon would be the first observed, while those who would almost see out the year would not be witnessed until almost 1.00 a.m. Other variations of the superstition say that the watchers would see headless or rotting corpses, or coffins approaching. "If the person is to be drowned, his representative will come as if struggling and splashing in water, and so on for other cases of premature death."

Extract from the poem 'The Vigil of St Mark' (1806) by James Montgomery:

Tis now, replied the village belle,
St. Mark’s mysterious eve,
And all that old traditions tell
I tremblingly believe;
How, when the midnight signal tolls,
Along the churchyard green,
A mournful train of sentenced souls
In winding-sheets are seen.
The ghosts of all whom death shall doom
Within the coming year,
In pale procession walk the gloom,
Amid the silence drear.

Another tradition holds that a young woman can see the face of her future husband appear on her smock by holding it before the fire on St Mark's Eve.

The Fairfield Village Community Association observes St. Mark's Eve by encouraging people "...to light a candle, pause and think of those people suffering in body, mind or spirit and ask that they receive strength and healing."

== In popular literature ==
- The Eve of St. Mark, a poem by John Keats
- The Eve of St. Mark, a 1942 play by Maxwell Anderson
- Washington Irving included a story called "St. Mark's Eve" in his 1822 collection, Bracebridge Hall. The story describes several British superstitions about the souls of those soon to die appearing at the local church steps on St. Mark's Eve
- The Eve of St. Mark, a 1944 motion picture based on the play with several actors of the 1942 production reprising their roles in the film. One of the conditions of Anderson selling the film rights to the play was that it not appear before January 1944, after the play had completed its run. 20th Century Fox reshot the ending when test audiences did not like the original ending of the play.
- In Maggie Stiefvater’s The Raven Boys Saint Mark's Eve is when clairvoyants can see the spirit of the dead
