= The Eve of St. Mark =

1944 film by John M. Stahl, Maxwell Anderson

- Original Broadway cast poster
- Written by: Maxwell Anderson

Premiere
- Directed by: Lem Ward

The Eve of St Mark is a 1942 play by Maxwell Anderson set during World War II. It later became a 1944 film by 20th Century Fox that featured some of the same actors who repeated their roles in the film. The title is derived from the legend of St. Mark's Eve and the title of an uncompleted 1819 poem by John Keats.

== Plot ==
Quizz West is conscripted into the United States Army in late 1940. Quizz and his hometown girlfriend Janet discuss their future plans before he ships off for San Francisco and then the Philippines.

When the U.S. enters the war, Quizz and his friends are manning a coastal artillery gun against overwhelming odds. Quizz communicates with his mother and Janet through dreams in which he asks them whether he and his friends should stay with their guns to sacrifice themselves by covering the withdrawing American troops or leave by boat for a chance of survival.

== Play ==
Maxwell Anderson dedicated the play to his nephew Sgt. Lee Chambers, who was killed in a military accident. When researching the contemporary U.S. Army for the play at Fort Bragg, North Carolina, Anderson was assigned a representative from the Army's public relations department named Marion Hargrove. The two became friends and Anderson based the character of Private Francis Marion on him. Anderson also recommended Hargrove's stories of army life to his publisher. When published as See Here, Private Hargrove, Anderson wrote a foreword to the book.

The play opened on October 7, 1942, and closed on June 26, 1943, after 307 performances. John Dall's appearance in the stage production led to him being signed by Warner Bros. The cast included William Prince as Private Quizz West, Aline MacMahon as Nell West, Edwin Cooper as Ralph West, Eddie O'Shea as Private Thomas Mulveroy, George Mathews as Sergeant Ruby, James Monks as Private Francis Marion, Martin Ritt as Private Glinka, Mary Rolfe as Janet Feller, and Clifford Carpenter as Zip West among others.

A London stage version was directed by Gabriel Pascal, with many of the roles played by American servicemen posted in England. One of the soldiers in the play was John Sweet, whom Michael Powell chose for the lead in his A Canterbury Tale.

== Film ==
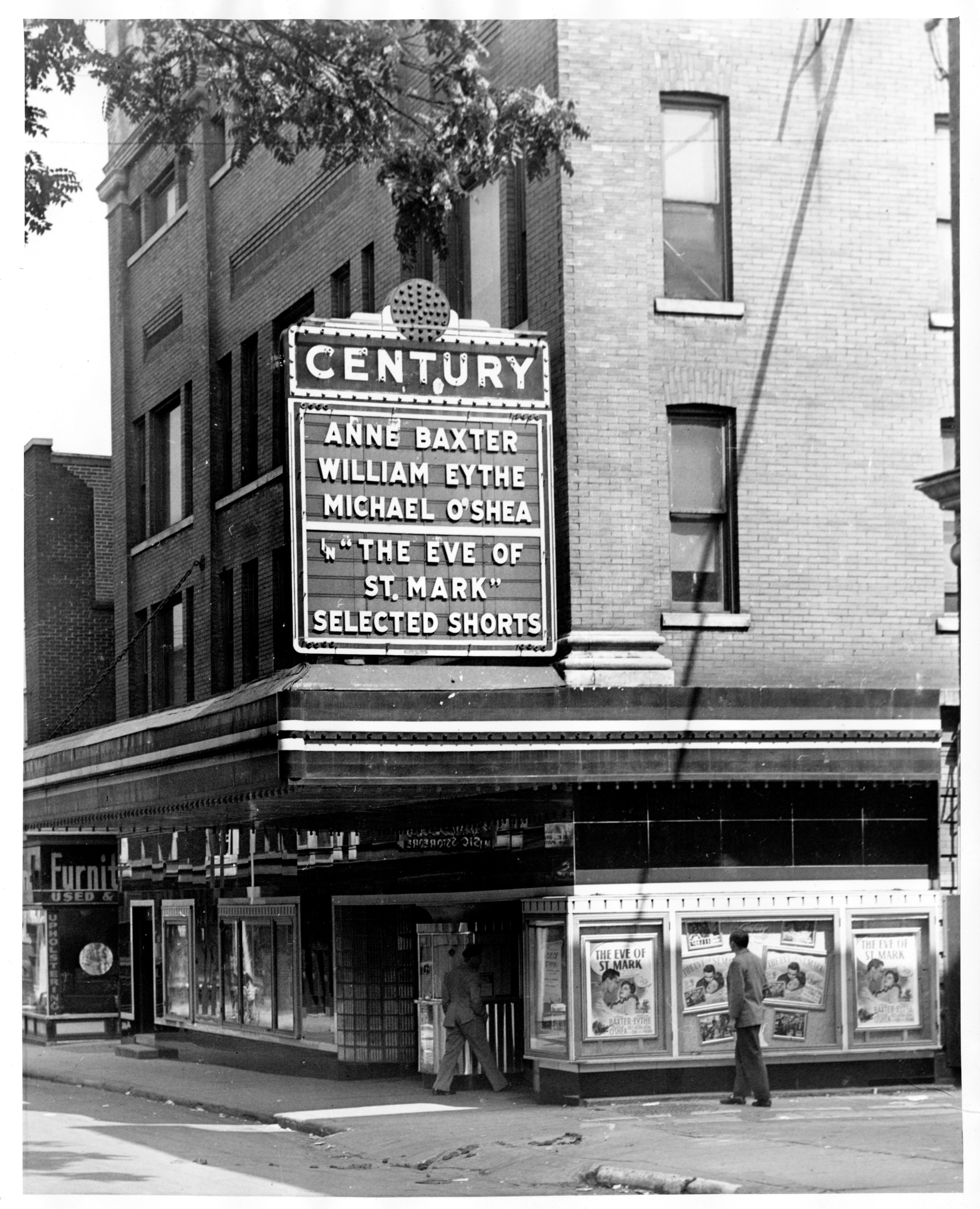
Marquee of the Century Theatre in Hamilton, Ontario advertising the film

After bidding by several Hollywood motion picture companies, 20th Century-Fox obtained the film rights to the play for $300,000. The studio agreed not to release the film before January 1944, when the play was expected to finish. The film was directed by John M. Stahl with Michael O'Shea, George Matthews , Joann Dolan, Joven E. Rola and Toni Favor repeating their original stage roles. It also featured Anne Baxter, Harry Morgan and Vincent Price. The film cost $1.4 million to produce.

To comply with the Motion Picture Production Code, the script was modified to avoid the play's sexual references and language. The film originally included the play's closing scene, but it was overwhelmingly rejected by war-weary test-screening audiences. A new ending was filmed with a more hopeful tone.

Screenwriter George Seaton recalled that he was unable to meet with Stahl before or during the filming and was unsatisfied with the result. Though Seaton's screenplay remained intact, Stahl's areas of emphasis differed from those that Seaton had intended, and Stahl recommended that Seaton become a director himself.
