= John Keats bibliography =

This article lists the complete poetic bibliography of John Keats (1795–1821), which includes odes, sonnets and fragments not published within his lifetime, as well as two plays.

== Poetry ==
=== Longer poems ===
- Sleep and Poetry (1816)
- Endymion (1817)
- Isabella or The Pot of Basil (1818)
- Hyperion (1818, unfinished)
- The Eve of St. Agnes (1819)
- Lamia (1819)
- The Cap and Bells (1819, unfinished)
- The Fall of Hyperion: A Dream (1819, unfinished)

=== Odes ===
- Ode to Apollo (1815)
- Robin Hood (To a Friend) (1818)
- Lines on the Mermaid Tavern (1818)
- Ode to Maia (1818)
- Bards of Passion and of Mirth (1818)
- Ode to Fanny (1819)
- 1819 odes:
  - Ode on a Grecian Urn
  - Ode on Indolence
  - Ode on Melancholy
  - Ode to a Nightingale
  - Ode to Psyche
  - To Autumn

=== Epistles ===
- To George Felton Mathew (1815)
- To My Brother George (1816)
- To Charles Cowden Clarke (1816)
- To John Hamilton Reynolds (1818)

=== Sonnets ===
- On Peace (1814)
- To Byron (1814)
- To Chatterton (1815)
- Written on the Day that Mr. Leigh Hunt left Prison (1815)
- To – (Had I a man's fair form...) (1815)
- Happy is England! (1815)
- How Many Bards Gild the Lapses of Time! (1815)
- On First Looking into Chapman's Homer (1815)
- Nebuchadnezzar's Dream (1815)
- To G. A. W. (Georgiana Augusta Wylie) (1816)
- As from the Darkening Gloom a Silver Dove (1816)
- On a Picture of Leander (1816)
- Oh! How I Love, on a Fair Summer's Eve (1816)
- O Solitude! If I Must with thee Dwell (1816)
- To One Who has been Long in City Pent (1816)
- To a Young Lady Who Sent Me a Laurel Crown (1816)
- To a Friend Who Sent Me Some Roses (1816)
- To My Brother George (1816)
- Keen, Fitful Gusts are Whisp'ring Here and There (1816)
- On Leaving Some Friends at an Early Hour (1816)
- To My Brothers (1816)
- Addressed to Haydon (Great spirits now on earth are sojourning...) (1816)
- Addressed to Haydon (Highmindedness, a jealousy for good...) (1816)
- Written in Disgust of Vulgar Superstition (1816)
- To Kosciusko (1816)
- On the Grasshopper and Cricket (1816)
- On Receiving a Laurel Crown from Leigh Hunt (1817)
- To the Ladies Who Saw Me Crowned (1817)
- After Dark Vapours have Oppress'd our Plains (1817)
- Written At The End Of The Floure and the Leafe (1817)
- To Haydon (Haydon! Forgive me that I cannot speak...) (1817)
- On Seeing the Elgin Marbles (1817)
- On The Story of Rimini (1817)
- To Leigh Hunt, Esq. (1817)
- On the Sea (1817)
- What the Thrush Said (1818)
- To a Cat (1818)
- On Sitting Down to Read King Lear Once Again (1818)
- When I Have Fears (1818)
- To a Lady Seen for a Few Moments at Vauxhall (1818)
- To Spenser (1818)
- To the Nile (1818)
- Blue! 'Tis the Life of Heaven, the Domain (1818)
- To Homer (1818)
- To J.R. (O that a week could be an age...) (1818)
- The Human Seasons (1818)
- On Visiting the Tomb of Burns (1818)
- To Ailsa Rock (1818)
- Written in the Cottage Where Burns Was Born (1818)
- On Hearing the Bag-Pipe and Seeing "The Stranger" Played at Inverary (1818)
- Written Upon the Top of Ben Nevis (1818)
- Translated from a Sonnet Of Ronsard (1818)
- Why did I Laugh Tonight? No Voice will Tell (1819)
- A Dream, After Reading Dante's Episode of "Paolo and Francesca" (1819)
- To Sleep (1819)
- On Fame (Fame, like a wayward girl...) (1819)
- On Fame (How fever'd is the man) (1819)
- On the Sonnet (1819)
- The Day is Gone, and All its Sweets are Gone! (1819)
- To Fanny (I cry your mercy—pity—love—aye, love!) (1819)
- Bright Star (1820)

=== Songs ===
- Stay, Ruby Breasted Warbler, Stay (1814)
- Hymn to Apollo (1816)
- You Say You Love (1817)
- A Song of Opposites (1818)
- Hush, Hush! Tread Softly! Hush, Hush my Dear! (1818)
- Extracts from an Opera (1818):
  - "O! Were I One of the Olympian Twelve"
  - "Daisy's Song"
  - "Folly's Song"
  - "Oh, I Am Frighten'd with Most Hateful Thoughts!"
  - "The Stranger Lighted from his Steed"
  - "Asleep! O Sleep a Little While, White Pearl"
- Faery Songs (1818):
  - "Shed no Tear! Oh, Shed no Tear!"
  - "Ah! Woe is Me! Poor Silver-Wing!"
- I Had a Dove (1818)
- Spirit Here that Reignest (1818)
- A Galloway Song (1818)
- A Song About Myself (1818)
- Song Of Four Faries (1819)
- La Belle Dame sans Merci (1819)

=== Other poems ===
- Imitation of Spenser (1814)
- Lines Written on 29 May (1814)
- On Death (1814)
- Women, Wine, and Snuff (1814)
- Fill for Me a Brimming Bowl (1814)
- To Hope (1815)
- To Some Ladies (1815)
- On Receiving a Curious Shell, and a Copy of Verses from the Same Ladies (1815)
- To Emma (1815)
- Woman! When I Behold thee Flippant, Vain (1815)
- Specimen of an Induction to a Poem (1816)
- Calidore (1816)
- Hadst thou Liv’d in Days of Old (1816)
- I Stood Tiptoe Upon a Little Hill (1816)
- I am as Brisk (1816)
- On Oxford (1817)
- O Grant that Like to Peter I (1817)
- Think not of it, Sweet One (1817)
- Unfelt, Unheard, Unseen (1817)
- In Drear-Nighted December (1817)
- Modern Love (1818)
- The Castle Builder (1818)
- Sharing Eve's Apple (1818)
- Lines on Seeing a Lock of Milton's Hair (1818)
- Where's the Poet? (1818)
- Apollo to the Graces (1818)
- A Draught of Sunshine (1818)
- God of the Meridian (1818)
- The Devon Maid (1818)
- For there's Bishop’s Teign (1818)
- Over the Hill and Over the Dale (1818)
- Character of Charles Armitage Brown (1818)
- When They were Come unto the Faery's Court (1818)
- Two or Three Posies (1818)
- Acrostic: Georgiana Augusta Keats (1818)
- Sweet, Sweet is the Greeting of Eyes (1818)
- Meg Merrilies (1818)
- Lines Written in the Highlands after a Visit to Burns's Country (1818)
- At Fingal's Cave (1818)
- The Gadfly (1818)
- Ben Nevis: A Dialogue (1818)
- Spenserian Stanza (In after-time, a sage of mickle lore...) (1818)
- A Prophecy (To George Keats in America) (1818)
- Fancy (1818)
- The Eve of St. Mark (1819)
- On Some Skulls in Beauley Abbey, near Inverness (1819)
- A Party of Lovers (1819)
- Lines to Fanny (1819)
- This Living Hand, Now Warm and Capable (1819)

== Plays ==
- King Stephen: A Fragment of a Tragedy (1819)
- Otho the Great: A Tragedy in Five Acts (1819)
