= The Raven Cycle =

Series of fantasy novels by Maggie Stiefvater

- Front cover of The Raven Boys
- The Raven Boys (2012); The Dream Thieves (2013); Blue Lily, Lily Blue (2014); The Raven King (2016)
- Author: Maggie Stiefvater
- Country: United States
- Language: English
- Genre: Young adult fiction, fantasy
- Publisher: Scholastic Press
- Published: September 18, 2012 – April 26, 2016
- Media type: Print
- No. of books: 4

The Raven Cycle is a series of four contemporary fantasy novels written by American author Maggie Stiefvater. The first novel, The Raven Boys, was published by Scholastic in 2012, and the final book, The Raven King, was published on April 26, 2016.

The Dreamer Trilogy is a sequel series that followed the Lynch family along with a cast of new characters. It was released between 2019 to 2022.

The Raven Cycle has also been adapted into a graphic novel series by Stephanie Williams with illustrations by Sas Milledge. The first novel, The Raven Boys, was released on August 5, 2025, and the second, The Dream Thieves, a year later on August 4, 2026. Adaptations for other books in the series have not yet been announced.

== Plot ==
=== The Raven Boys ===
Blue Sargent lives at 300 Fox Way in the fictional town of Henrietta, Virginia with her mother, Maura, and an assortment of other female relatives. All of the women at Fox Way are psychics, except for Blue, who amplifies psychics' abilities. All her life, Blue's has been told if she kisses her true love, he will die, and so she has decided to never kiss anyone.

On St Mark's Eve, Blue joins her half-aunt Neeve, who has recently returned to Henrietta, in an annual psychic tradition, where the spirits of those in Henrietta who will die within the next year appear along the "Corpse Road." Blue sees a teenage boy who introduces himself only as "Gansey," and Neeve tells Blue that she, a non-psychic, could only see his spirit because he is either her true love, or she will kill him.

The next day, Richard Campbell Gansey III hears his own voice on a recording he made the previous night. He relays this to his friends, Adam Parrish and Ronan Lynch. All three are "Raven Boys," so named because they attend Henrietta's prestigious private boys' school, Aglionby Academy. Ronan and Gansey live with another Raven Boy, Noah, in a former factory called Monmouth Manufacturing. Ronan moved in after his father was murdered; he and his brothers were barred from their home in their father's will, and their mother became comatose. Unlike his friends, Adam attends Aglionby on a partial scholarship. He works three part-time jobs to cover the rest of his tuition, and lives with his abusive parents in a trailer park. Gansey is concerned Adam is running himself ragged, but Adam refuses anything he perceives as charity or pity from his affluent friends.

At a diner that night, the boys meet Blue, who works as a waitress. Gansey unwittingly insults her when he attempts to ask her out on Adam's behalf, and Adam suggests a psychic could explain the recording. Later, Ronan brawls against his older brother, Declan, in the diner's parking lot. Meanwhile, the boys' Latin teacher, Whelk, reflects on his own time as an Aglionby student alongside his friend, Czerny, whom Whelk himself killed on St Mark's Eve. He is intrigued to learn Gansey is interested in the supernatural, including ley lines. Ronan finds a baby raven and names her Chainsaw.

Gansey, Adam and Ronan go to Blue's house for a psychic reading, whereupon Blue realizes Gansey is the spirit she saw. Based off his status as a Raven Boy, and their encounter at the diner, Blue vows never to fall in love with him. Nevertheless, she befriends the boys, and shows mutual romantic interest in Adam. Gansey explains they are searching for the Welsh king Owain Glendower. Seven years ago, Gansey was stung to death by hornets, but was revived by a voice that told him he would live because of Glendower. He is thought to be buried on Henrietta's Corpse Road—also called a ley line—but Gansey is certain that Glendower is merely sleeping, and will grant a favor to whoever wakes him.

In their search, the group discovers a mysterious forest on the ley line called Cabeswater, which seems to exist outside of time, and whose trees speak to them in Latin. They also begin to suspect that their search for Glendower is being watched, and Blue tells Gansey about her deadly true love's kiss.

One afternoon, out exploring on their own, Gansey and Blue discover a human skeleton with a driver's license belonging to "Noah Czerny." Back at Monmouth, Noah confirms he has been dead for seven years, killed by his former best friend to awaken the ley line. His remains are reported to the police, and Whelk, realizing he could be implicated, decides to attempt another ritual. He holds Gansey at gunpoint and steals Gansey's supernatural research journal. Blue learns that Neeve was contacted by Whelk for help, though she refused him, and that she returned to Henrietta to help search for Blue's father.

Neeve suggests Blue and the boys wake the ley line, advising that Whelk attempted this with Noah and whoever wakes the ley line will be able to control its power. Adam's father, believing Adam has not given him enough of the income from Adam's jobs, beats Adam severely and deafens Adam in one ear. Ronan intervenes and fights Adam's father, and Adam is forced to report the abuse to spare Ronan being arrested. Gansey helps Adam move his things from his parents' and Blue meets the boys at Monmouth, where she takes a call from a British ley line researcher, who tells her one of his assistants lost their skin when they stepped onto an activated ley line. Adam is unfazed, arguing Whelk will wake if the boys don't, but Gansey refuses. Back at Blue's, Adam asks if he can kiss Blue, and she gently refuses. Frustrated by feeling inferior to his richer friends, Adam goes to wake the line alone.

Under the guise of agreeing to help him after all, Neeve kidnaps Whelk, intending to kill him and obtain the line's power for herself. Whelk escapes and attacks Neeve, attempting to sacrifice her instead, but Neeve suddenly vanishes. The other teens arrive after Adam, but amidst the chaos, Adam breaks off from the group and sacrifices his free will to the line, becoming the hands and eyes of Cabeswater. A stampede of mysterious creatures then barrel through the forest, narrowly missing Blue, Ronan, and Gansey, and killing Whelk. After Noah's funeral, they dig up Noah's body to re-bury him on the awakened line, strengthening his spirit. Ronan reveals that he took Chainsaw out of his dreams.

=== The Dream Thieves ===
Several weeks have passed, and it is now summer vacation. Aware that Gansey is meant to die within the year, Blue is determined to find Glendower so they can use his favor to ask for Gansey's life. Blue comes by Adam's new home above a church, but is upset when Adam attempts to kiss her, and Adam grows angry. His concerns about whether he has inherited his father's rage are interrupted when the ley line briefly vanishes. Meanwhile, a hit-man known as the Gray Man arrives in Henrietta on the orders of a man named Colin Greenmantle, searching for an artefact called the Greywaren.

Gansey's mother is running for office and Gansey invites Adam to a fundraiser in D.C., in the hopes Adam might attain an internship or some other favor from a wealthy, well-connected attendee. Adam asks Gansey if it's strange Blue doesn't want to kiss him, unaware that Gansey knows of Blue's kiss prediction, and agrees to come to the fundraiser. That night, Ronan dreams of the Orphan Girl, as he has many times before, and she asks him to take her with him. Ronan goads a fellow Aglionby student, Joseph Kavinsky, into a street race. At Fox Way, Maura and the other psychics are concerned about Adam, in the wake of his deal with Cabeswater. The teens leave for Cabeswater just as the Gray Man arrives, seeking psychic advice on the Greywaren. He candidly reveals he is a hit-man, and he and Maura flirt.

The teens find Cabeswater has vanished. That night, Ronan unwittingly pulls creatures from his nightmares. Gansey and Ronan kill one creature, but the other escapes. The next day, the boys and Blue bury the nightmare at Ronan's home. There, all the living things, including Ronan's mother, are asleep. With Calla's help, they learn this is because they were pulled from dreams by Ronan's father, and that Cabeswater was also pulled from dreams. The Gray Man breaks into Monmouth to search for the Greywaren. Gansey and Blue begin to feel drawn to one another.

At Fox Way, the Gray Man asks Maura to dinner, and she accepts. Gansey confronts Kavinsky about Monmouth being broken into. Kavinsky freely admits to having broken in, but insists he didn't destroy anything, and tells Ronan he looks forward to their next street race. Ronan later has a charged, suggestive dream about Adam, who then morphs into Kavinsky. The Gray Man's date with Maura goes well. After, with Blue's help, Maura deduces the Greywaren is Ronan, though the Gray Man doesn't know it.

Gansey and Adam go to D.C., and Malory calls, having figured the reason Cabeswater vanished is the ley line lacks energy. With Gansey gone, Ronan dreams a set of keys for Gansey's Camaro, and Noah lets Blue into Monmouth. Blue admits to herself that she has a crush on Gansey. Noah offers to kiss her, and she agrees, since he is already dead. Ronan steals the Camaro and races Kavinsky, whereupon the escaped nightmare then returns. Kavinsky shoots it dead, but not before it wrecks the Camaro. He then tells Ronan to simply dream Gansey a new car, revealing that he is a dreamer as well.

At the fundraiser, Adam feels out of place. He and Gansey argue about Adam's deal with Cabeswater, and Adam begins to hallucinate apparitions. Later, Adam vanishes from the fundraiser only to be found miles away, having seemingly blacked out. On Ronan's phone, Kavinsky texts Gansey about the wrecked Camaro, then offers to teach Ronan how to pull larger things from his dreams, and to do so deliberately. Unbeknownst to either, the Gray Man sees them, and realizes the Greywaren is a person, not an object. After a few attempts, Ronan successfully dreams a second Camaro, and Kavinsky is infuriated when Ronan leaves, choosing Gansey over him.

Once back in Henrietta, Adam demands to know why Blue won't kiss him, and Blue tells him of the prediction about her true love. They break off their not-quite-relationship and Persephone, another Fox Way psychic, helps Adam understand his hallucinations. He learns he must uphold his deal to be Cabeswater's hands and eyes. Blue, frustrated by her feelings, calls Gansey to take her for a drive. They share an intimate conversation and almost kiss, then agree to never speak of it again.

The Gray Man does not want to kidnap Ronan, so calls Greenmantle and lies that he is keeping the Greywaren for himself, which will draw attention away from Ronan. The Gray Man also reveals to Ronan he was the one who murdered Ronan's father, on Greenmantle's orders. For cheating him, Greenmantle learns the Gray Man's real identity and sets the Gray Man's psychopathic brother on his trail.

With Persephone's help, Adam fixes small interruptions on the ley line, allowing the energy to flow clearer and strengthen Cabeswater. However, it will not be enough if Kavinsky continues to pull so much from his dreams. Ronan realizes Kavinsky has kidnapped his younger brother, Matthew, as retribution. At a party, Kavinsky is excited when Ronan tells him their dreaming is destroying a world, and dreams an enormous dragon made of fire. Adam and Perspehone hurry to clear the ley line to give Ronan enough energy to dream a countermeasure. The Orphan Girl tells Ronan that there are many dream thieves, but only one Greywaren, and he dreams an enormous, white night-horror, which fights Kavinsky's dragon. Ronan rescues Matthew from the trunk of a car and Kavinsky dies by his own dragon.

The Gray Man confronts and kills his brother, then returns to Henrietta. Having figured a loophole in the wording of his father's will, Ronan dreams a new one that will allow him and his brothers to return home. The group take Ronan's mother to Cabeswater, where she wakes up, and Blue finds a note from Maura saying that she, like Glendower, is underground.

=== Blue Lily, Lily Blue ===
Blue's mother, Maura, has left to look for Artemus, Blue's birth father, underground. Persephone continues to help Adam learn how to fix the ley lines as Cabeswater has asked. Calla, another psychic, tries to contact Maura with her abilities and tells Blue and boys of three "sleepers," the third of which they must not wake. Colin Greenmantle becomes the Latin teacher at Aglionby, and Adam and Ronan use Ronan's dreams to fabricate evidence of murder and child abuse to drive him out of Henrietta. Blue and Gansey find another cave in the backyard of a man named Jesse Dittley, who was one of the spirits Neeve saw in the graveyard. Inside the cave, they find a woman named Gwenllian, who is Glendower's daughter and a psychic. Persephone dies in an attempt to find Maura, and Greenmantle's bored wife, Piper, hires thugs to escort her to Jesse Dittley's cave. The teens and Gwenllian go to the Cabeswater cave, where they find animal skeletons that they collectively wake up. Blue and Ronan find a magic lake where, after crossing, Blue finds Maura and Artemus. Blue, Artemus, Maura, and the Gray Man escape, leaving Piper and the thug in the collapsed cave. In the cave, Neeve finds Piper, who wakes up the third sleeper.

=== The Raven King ===
The fourth and final installation of The Raven Cycle is entitled The Raven King. Gansey, Adam, Ronan, Noah, and Blue continue their quest to find the Welsh King Glendower. When Piper wakes up the third sleeper, a demon with the power to "unmake", the boys and Blue race to save Cabeswater.

=== Short Stories ===
Short Stories in the Raven Cycle universe include "Opal", "A Very Declan Christmas", and two short drabbles taking place around the holidays: one about Gansey, and one about 300 Fox Way.

== Setting ==
Much of the story takes place in the fictional town of Henrietta, Virginia, which sits directly on top of a powerful ley line. Adam, Ronan, Blue, Noah, and Gansey repeatedly return to the mysterious Cabeswater, a forest which exists out of its own time and can speak to the group in Latin. Adam, Ronan, and Gansey all attend school at Aglionby Academy, an expensive all-boys private school. Ronan's childhood home is called The Barns, and it's where he discovers his mother is one of his father's dream creations. 300 Fox Way is the home of Blue and the multitude of psychic women in Henrietta. Monmouth Manufacturing is the abandoned and gutted warehouse, owned by Gansey, in which he, Ronan, and Noah reside, as well as the place where Malory and his service dog stay during their visit. Some of the story takes place in the caves that are underneath Cabeswater, where Glendower is supposedly sleeping, based on the Luray Caverns. The forests were inspired by the Shenandoah Valley, and Stiefvater has suggested Staunton, Virginia as a destination for fans to travel to.

== Major characters ==
=== Blue Sargent ===
Blue Sargent is the daughter of a psychic named Maura, and lives with her and other psychic women at their home, 300 Fox Way. Despite not having psychic abilities of her own, Blue is able to amplify the energy of other psychics and supernatural beings. She works at a restaurant called Nino's, and desperately wants to travel the world and help others. The psychic women that live with her have told her that if she ever kisses her true love, he will die.

=== Maura Sargent ===
Maura is the psychic mother of Blue, and she typically uses tarot cards to make her readings. She usually wears her trademark tattered jeans, and has a penchant for going barefoot. She falls in love with the Gray Man, and later disappears underground, supposedly in search of Artemus, Blue's biological father. She does important tarot readings with her two best friends, Persephone and Calla.

=== Richard Campbell Gansey III ===
Called Gansey by his friends, Richard Campbell Gansey III is a student at Aglionby Academy, and the son of a wealthy businessman and politician. Gansey has been on a journey to find the sleeping Welsh king, Glendower, who Gansey believes saved his life seven years prior. Gansey's allergy to bee stings caused him to die seven years ago from a hornet sting, but he believes that his life was saved by Glendower. This experience left Gansey anxious and prone to panic attacks. He drives an orange 1973 Chevrolet Camaro called "The Pig," which is inspired by author Maggie Stiefvater's own vintage Camaro.

=== Adam Parrish ===
Adam Parrish is a student at Aglionby Academy who struggles financially, but doesn't want financial assistance or pity from his friends. At the beginning of the story, he lives with his mother and his abusive father in a trailer, but he later stands up for himself by pressing charges against his father and moving into an apartment above St. Agnes Church. He sacrificed his free will to Cabeswater, promising to fix the ley lines and help restore Cabeswater. As of The Raven King, he is in a relationship with Ronan Lynch. Adam is deaf in his left ear due to a violent incident with his father. He worked as a mechanic and was later taught how to harness Cabeswater's energy by Persephone before her death. He gets a car of his own that is old, beat-up, and made of parts from different makes and models of cars. Ronan refers to it as the "Hondayota".

=== Ronan Lynch ===
Described as "dangerous as a shark and about as friendly," Ronan Lynch is a gay Catholic farmer with a drinking problem and the ability to take things out of his dreams. He has two brothers: Declan, his charismatic older brother, and Matthew, his good-humored younger brother, who Ronan took out of his dreams when he was a child. Ronan's parents are both dead. He's friends with the main cast, and as of The Raven King, he is in a relationship with Adam Parrish. Ronan's habits of leaving jokes on the board in Latin class was inspired by Stiefvater's own experience in school.

Ronan is the central character in a companion series called The Dreamer Trilogy, which takes place after the events of The Raven King and "Opal." His favorite past times include defenestrating his close friend Noah Czerny, and (in The Dream Thieves) street racing with Kavinsky.

=== Noah Czerny ===
Noah Czerny was a skater boy and student at Aglionby who has been dead for seven years at the time of The Raven Boys. He was murdered by Barrington Whelk, his friend and classmate, when Whelk attempted, and failed, to sacrifice him to wake the ley lines. He relies on energy of the ley lines or Blue Sargent in order to stay substantial. Over the course of the series, it is revealed that his spirit is decaying and he needs more energy in order to appear normally. He often is caught re-enacting his death at points in the story. On his final appearance, he sacrifices the memories his friends have of him in order to save Gansey's life.

=== Colin Greenmantle ===
Colin Greenmantle is a collector of mysterious artifacts and the employer of the Gray Man, otherwise known as Mr. Gray. He sent Mr. Gray to kill Ronan Lynch's father, and then sends him to find the Greywaren. He comes to Henrietta under the guise of Aglionby's new Latin teacher, so that he can find the Greywaren himself after Mr. Gray betrays him. He leaves Henrietta and returns to Boston, leaving his wife Piper alone in Jesse Dittley's cave. He is later killed by Piper, who uses a demon against him.

=== The Gray Man (Mr. Gray) ===
The Gray Man is a hit-man initially hired by Greenmantle to steal something called the "Greywaren." While in Henrietta, he takes a liking to the town and falls in love with Blue's mother Maura, who loves him back. He leaves Henrietta to protect Ronan, but returns when he discovers that Greenmantle has come back. He enjoys Anglo-Saxon poetry and recites poems from memory occasionally throughout the story. He listens to the 60s band the Kinks religiously, and is regarded as a calm, practical, and capable man.

=== Glendower ===
Glendower is the Welsh king that allegedly saved Gansey's life seven years before the story takes place. Throughout the story, the characters talk about and refer to Glendower, even though they do not directly interact with him. If the teenagers find Glendower and wake him, they believe he will grant them each a favor. It is later revealed in The Raven King that Gansey did not hear Glendower's voice when he died, but Noah's instead.

== Other characters ==
=== The Psychics ===
At 300 Fox Way, a multitude of psychics come into play, including Orla, Neeve, Persephone, Calla, and Jimi. These women all use their abilities to help the group of teenagers find their way to Glendower, as well as a way to make a living.

==== Neeve ====
Neeve is Maura's half-sister. She is a commercial psychic and TV show host. She is morally ambiguous and it is never quite clear whose side she's on. She is killed by Piper's demon after attempting to contact 300 Fox Way.

==== Persephone ====
Persephone is Maura and Calla's best friend, and she lives at 300 Fox Way. She is good at seeing vague details and tends to be a bit disconnected from the physical world around her. In Blue Lily Lily Blue, she begins tutoring Adam and teaching him how to use his newfound powers. She often acts as the middle ground between Calla and Maura. She is overall an otherworldly person. She dies after attempting to locate Maura.

==== Calla ====
Calla is Maura and Persephone's best friend. She is the bluntest and most standoffish of the psychics, and has a penchant for purple lipsticks. Calla has a specific psychic power: when touching an object, she can divine details about its owner and their memories. Calla is prickly and shows a general disdain for those around her, but is a good person.

==== Orla ====
Orla is Jimi's daughter and Maura Sargent's niece. She is beautiful and knows it, and she has a knowledge of almost all town gossip. She has an endless string of ex-lovers, and is self-confident and social.

==== Jimi ====
Jimi is Orla's mother and Blue's aunt. Her psychic specialty is in spiritual harmony and cleansing bad energy. She is peaceful and easygoing, but a very minor character.

=== Artemus ===
Artemus is one of Glendower's magicians and followers, and is the biological father of Blue Sargent. Blue had never met him until she found and rescued him from the cave underneath Cabeswater. At 300 Fox Way, he shuts himself in a closet because he is terrified of Gwenllian. He reveals himself to be a "Tir e e'lintes," a tree person, and reveals that he can speak the puzzle box language. After being chased outside by Gwenllian, he hides inside the beech tree in 300 Fox Ways backyard, where he stays until Blue comes to him for guidance at the end of the book.

=== Gwenllian ===
Gwenllian is the daughter of Glendower, and is discovered face down in a stone coffin in Jesse Dittley's cave. She continuously speaks in riddles and sings randomly. She and Blue are alike in that they don't have normal psychic abilities, but rather they mirror others' abilities.

=== Henry Cheng ===
Henry Cheng is an Aglionby student of Korean and Chinese descent. He is friends with Gansey and later befriends Blue, while Adam and Ronan are not very fond of him. Throughout The Raven King, his bond with Gansey and Blue is strengthened, and he's present in various important passages. By the end of the series Henry, Gansey, and Blue travel together for an (at least) year-long journey.

=== Joseph Kavinsky ===
Joseph Kavinsky, referred to as "Kavinsky" and "K," has the same ability as Ronan to pull things out of his dreams. He uses this ability to steal from his dreams, whereas Ronan asks for things. Kavinsky likes to race Ronan and has a field full of replicas of the same car. He has an fixation on Ronan and Gansey's relationship, often making gay jokes about them. He uses his dreaming ability for his own selfish purposes and eventually dies because of a fire dragon he took from a dream.

=== Jesse Dittley ===
A minor character, Jesse Dittley's name is on the list of people that Neeve saw at the beginning of the story in the graveyard indicating his death within twelve months. Later, Blue and Gansey meet him and convince him to let them explore his cave, even though Dittley tells them that his family is cursed by it. In the cave, they find Gwenllian, and later Dittley reveals that strange creatures have been coming out of the cave, sometimes coming into the house. Piper Greenmantle kills him in order to enter the cave.

=== Piper Greenmantle ===
The wife of Colin Greenmantle, she first appears in Blue Lily, Lily Blue as a woman who simply wants to be entertained. When Colin moves her to Henrietta to search for the Greywaren, she takes up an interest in psychics and tarot cards, and eventually decides to search for the Greywaren on her own. She hires two thugs herself and kills Jesse Dittley, forcing herself into his cave. After a cave-in, she wakes up and enters a room where a mysterious, non-human creature is in a tomb, and she tells it to wake up. This creature is later revealed to be a demon. Piper attempts to sell the demon, but is unsuccessful when she is shot by her father.

== Reception ==
Publishers Weekly gave The Raven Boys a favorable review, calling it "a tour de force of characterization, and while there is no lack of event or mystery, it is the way Stiefvater's people live in the reader's imagination that makes this such a memorable read." A reviewer writing for The Guardian commended the novel's characters as unique in comparison to "the collection of stereotypes we now see often in YA books." The New York Times' Anna Holmes complimented the novel's pacing and wrote that, "Stiefvater, who has an assured and entertaining way with language, doesn't talk down to her readers, and she ably blends the mystical and the earthly, the primitive and the contemporary in a way that brings to mind the work of John Bellairs, J. K. Rowling, Lois Duncan and Stephenie Meyer." However, Holmes criticized a perceived lack of coherence in the storytelling, and wrote that, "Perhaps most glaringly, the book's one true antagonist is never fully fleshed out, which undermines the stakes Stiefvater has worked so hard to raise."

The Dream Thieves also received a favorable review from Publishers Weekly, which concluded that, "While Stiefvater's offbeat, acutely observed characters continue to grow, they have shifted from developing a group interaction to reacting against one another, making this installment more tense and foreboding than its predecessor—and every bit as gripping." Tara Creel of the Deseret News praised The Dream Thieves for its "intricate plot, dimensional characters and beautiful, lyrical writing." Canadian cartoonist Faith Erin Hicks created an illustrated review and considered Dream Thieves one of her favourite YA novels.

In a review of Blue Lily, Lily Blue, Publishers Weekly wrote that, "As in the previous books, Stiefvater's razor-sharp characterizations, drily witty dialogue, and knack for unexpected metaphors and turns of phrase make for sumptuous, thrilling reading."

In a review of The Raven King, Publishers Weekly summated: "The playful, imaginative force of Stiefvater's writing works its magic once again, and most readers will finish this saga not with regret or disappointment but with hope."

Lauren Sarner of Inverse praised The Raven Cycle series as "a breath of fresh air in the fantasy landscape, and though it concluded in 2016, it promises a bright path ahead for fantasy."

== Adaptations ==
On April 10, 2017, it was announced that a TV adaptation of the series was in production, with Catherine Hardwicke attached to direct and produce, and Andrew Miller as its showrunner. It was to be distributed by Warner Bros. Domestic Television. In November 2019, Stiefvater confirmed she had written a pilot. In 2020, Stiefvater confirmed in a now-deleted tweet that production had stopped.

On October 17, 2022, Maggie Stiefvater announced via Twitter that the novels would be adapted into a series of graphic novels. The first volume was released on July 29, 2025. It was published by Viking Books for Young Readers, adapted by Stephanie Williams and illustrated by Sas Milledge. It was met with warm reception with dozens of sold out book tour dates and positive news coverage. It ranked fourth on the Indie Works and Graphic Novels Bestseller list by the American Bookseller Association. The sequel, The Dream Thieves, without Williams' involvement, was released on August 4, 2026.
