= The Wolves of Mercy Falls =

Novel series by Maggie Stiefvater

- American covers of Shiver, Linger and Forever
- Shiver (2009); Linger (2010); Forever (2011); Sinner (2014)
- Author: Maggie Stiefvater
- Country: United States
- Language: English
- Genre: Romance, fantasy, young adult fiction
- Publisher: Scholastic
- Published: 1 August 2009 – 1 July 2014
- Media type: Print
- No. of books: 4
- Website: https://maggiestiefvater.com/the-shiver-trilogy/

The Wolves of Mercy Falls is a series of four fantasy romance Young Adult novels, written by Maggie Stiefvater. Published by Scholastic between 2009 and 2014, the series consists of Shiver (2009), Linger (2010), Forever (2011), and Sinner (2014). The series is set in the fictional town of Mercy Falls, Minnesota, which Stiefvater has stated neighbors the real town of Ely, sharing a similar climate.

The novels largely follow the relationship between Grace Brisbane and Sam Roth as tensions between humans and wolves/werewolves rise in the aftermath of an attack on a school boy.

Shiver (2009), the first book in the Shiver trilogy, is written from the alternating perspectives of both Grace and Sam. The second book, Linger (2010), includes the perspectives of Isabel Culpeper and Cole St Clair, alongside those of Grace and Sam. The final book of the trilogy, Forever (2011), is written from Grace, Sam, Isabel and Cole's perspectives, with a short prologue from a werewolf named Shelby.

A fourth addition to the series, Sinner (2014), is a standalone book which closely follows the characters of Isabel Culpeper and Cole St Clair, set in the Southern California city of Los Angeles, as told from the perspectives of Isabel and Cole.

Stiefvater's Shiver remained on The New York Times bestseller list for over 32 weeks in 2009, selling 130,996 copies. Since publication, it has been licensed in over 30 foreign territories. The second book in the series, Linger, debuted at number 1 on the Times Bestseller list in 2010. There are more than 1.7 million copies of the Shiver trilogy in print.

== Plot ==
=== Shiver ===
Shiver begins against the backdrop of winter, with the character of Grace Brisbane at age 11, who has been pulled from her backyard tire swing by a pack of wolves. Saved from their attack by a yellow-eyed wolf, the 6 years following consist of Grace routinely watching the edge of the woods behind her house in search of her saviour – he returns her gaze every winter. The perspective of the novel alternates between Grace and the yellow-eyed werewolf, Samuel K. "Sam" Roth, who only transforms over the duration of winter and spends his summers working at a local bookstore. He is afraid that his days as a human are numbered, and every transformation could be his last.

The death of Jack Culpeper, a student at Grace's school, spreads terror throughout the small community of Mercy Falls, as it is suspected that he has been killed by the wolves. This leads to the decision to hunt them, with Grace's attempt to deter the shooters resulting in her discovery of Sam, except now in human form. Having been shot, he had unwillingly transformed into his human state, recognisable to Grace only from his eyes.

Sam is taken to the hospital by Grace, receiving surgery to remove the bullet. As the two are finally left alone in the recovery unit, Sam awakens from the anaesthetic much earlier than anticipated and recognises Grace. Sam explains to her that his healing abilities are a side-effect of being a werewolf, prompting them to escape before the doctors discover him awake and with no visible wound.

Grace invites Sam to stay at her house following these events, who reluctantly agrees to sleep in her room, as they decide to hide his presence from her parents. Back at school, Grace's close friend Olivia Marx reveals that a wolf had been sighted outside the school the day prior. Its description matches that of the suspected newly transformed werewolf, Jack Culpeper.

Sam attempts to convince Grace that she must also be a werewolf after having been attacked by the wolves as a child, despite never transforming. At school, Isabel Culpeper tells Grace that she has seen her brother alive in the woods. Jack had told her that Grace could explain how he was alive, but to protect the pack, Grace lies and implies Isabel has gone mad.

Sam drives to the home of his adoptive father, Geoffrey Beck, where the pack live together over the summer months. Upon arriving at the house, Sam finds Beck and a van containing three newly turned werewolves. Disgusted that Beck would deliberately put others through the pain of transforming, he leaves.

The day after meeting Grace's parents, Sam rushes downstairs in the early morning to the scene of Grace being pinned against the kitchen cupboards by Shelby, a werewolf. Sam attacks the wolf, saving his girlfriend, but gaining an injury himself in the process.

At school, Isabel shows Grace a stack of Olivia's photos containing two pictures of Jack, both as a wolf and as a human. Forced into revealing the pack's secrets, Grace invites Isabel over to her house, where she and Sam explain about the werewolves.

Sam finds Isabel and Jack in the woods, returning to the Culpeper mansion with them and discovering that Jack has been trying to find a cure to become human. Convinced that Grace had not transformed because of the existence of a cure, he decides to find her.

Waiting for Sam to pick her up from school, Grace climbs into her car before realising it is Jack behind the wheel. He tells her she must give him the cure to be human again, using Sam as leverage, who he has as hostage. Grace calls Beck, alerting him to the situation. The two arrive at Beck's house soon after.

Jack transforms into a wolf upon entering. Grace helps Beck to lock him in the bathroom, before calling Sam's mobile. He answers, saying he has been locked in a shed on the Culpeper's estate. Grace calls Isabel to help find him, as the temperature is about to drop and Sam could transform. Isabel eventually finds him and brings him inside, saving him from the cold.

Grace comes to the conclusion that nearly dying from heat stroke as a child cured her, as Isabel suggests that the same effect could be mirrored by injecting Sam and Jack with meningitis. After they infect the two boys, Sam transforms into a wolf, vanishing into the woods, while Jack dies of the infection.

After not seeing Sam for months, Grace finally finds him appearing at the edge of the woods behind her house, shockingly in human form. They embrace.

=== Linger ===
A newly recovered Sam finds Cole transforming in Beck's house and realises that he is one of the teenagers Beck had turned for the future of the pack. After becoming human again, Cole turns up at Isabel's house in search of clothes. To hide her grief over Jack, she ends up kissing him, but he disappears as a wolf again.

Grace becomes very sick and, when she cries in pain, her parents find Sam in her room. They take Grace to the hospital and forbid Sam from seeing her again. After returning from the hospital, Grace makes plans to go and live with Sam at Beck's house. She leaves home one night and Sam is ecstatic to see her.

Isabel and Sam find Cole having a fit and discover that he was experimenting with needles, trying to find a way to transition. Isabel and Cole later kiss again when he's warming up in the bath and again when visiting her mother's clinic. After spending a day together, during which Cole admits his famous past to her, they almost sleep together until Cole rejects her, not believing he is good enough for her.

When Grace's health worsens, Sam and Cole take her to the hospital where her father punches Sam. Cole realises that, because Grace was bitten but didn't change in a set amount of time, she's dying. He eventually comes to the conclusion that she needs to turn.

Isabel shows up and creates a distraction to get Grace's parents out of the room. Cole then gives Grace his DNA and she shifts, escaping out the window. Sam states that he will find a cure, and then he will find Grace.

=== Forever ===
Shelby finds Olivia and kills her. Grace turns into a human and manages to call Sam, but by the time he arrives for her, she has already turned back. A desperate Cole tries to call Isabel but since she's still upset at his rejection, he leaves 20 voicemails on her machine.

Grace is chased into a sinkhole by Shelby. Sam and Cole find her and manage to save her, locking her in the bathroom until she can change back. Isabel is shocked to discover that her father is arranging for the wolves to be removed from the protected species list.

Cole reads Beck's diaries and discovers that the wolves have been moved once before, when Hannah, a wolf who could retain her human memories in wolf form, led them.

Sam is interrogated by Officer Koenig as he is the suspect to be behind the death and possible rape (as she was found naked) of Olivia, and Grace's disappearance. Sam and Grace tell him about the wolves and he tells them that he owns land just outside Mercy Falls where the wolves would be safe.

Grace visits her parents to say goodbye, but they have replaced her with a cat. Cole captures Beck and calls Sam and Grace. He injects Beck with a substance he has made, despite Sam's protests, and it turns Beck human again. They tell him that Sam was successfully cured but they have to move the wolves.

Beck tells them about Hannah and turns back into a wolf, agreeing to help. Cole injects Sam and himself, turning them into wolves. The helicopter catches up to them and Beck is killed. The pack splits when Shelby and Cole fight. Shelby attacks Cole but they are shot.

Isabel, who has driven up to the commotion, is hurt by Cole's apparent death and drives onto the scene. Her father texts her to leave, but she refuses. The hunt stops and the wolves arrive safely.

Finally, Isabel discovers that her parents are sending her to California for ruining the hunt. Cole calls her and she is thrilled that he is alive. He admits that he needed to talk to her before he saw Sam and Grace. She tells him to keep her number, and they say goodbye.

=== Sinner ===
Cole travels to Los Angeles, California and visits Isabel, persuading her to agree to have dinner with him. In the day, Cole visits the home of Baby North, owner of the web TV show SharpT33th, before he begins starring in her NARKOTIKA based reality show.

Baby visits Isabel later in the day and proposes that she should star alongside Cole. The discovery that Cole did not come to California to find her, but instead to return to the spot light, devastates Isabel. She refuses to be on the show, calling Cole to accuse him of lying to her, before telling him to drop dead.

Cole begins living in the house supplied by Baby alongside the three-member band she had arranged. Cameras are sewn throughout the house, with a camera crew to match. After rejecting the guitarist and bassist chosen for him, he decidedly informs Baby's that he shall conduct the auditions himself. Isabel calls Cole and tells him she will go out for breakfast with him instead.

Isabel joins Cole at his house for breakfast, which they eat in the bathroom, the only place out of reach from the cameras. Their date is interrupted by a phone call from Baby, informing him that preparations have been made to host the auditions on the beach, as he had requested. Isabel refuses to join him.

Cole calls his old band member Jeremy Shutt, wanting him to return to playing bass for him. Already playing bass for a new band, he agrees to come to the auditions, but only to help Cole to choose his successor. After the auditions have finished, Cole unsuccessful in his search of a new bassist, Jeremy finally agrees to join NARKOTIKA again. Isabel watches the first episode online.

In between going on dates with Isabel and transforming into a werewolf in his bathroom, Cole begins writing NARKOTIKA's new album. Baby's attempts to sabotage him fall short, as Isabel and his secret transformations into a wolf help him maintain his sanity and sobriety.

Isabel arrives at a birthday party arranged for Cole, finding him smelling of alcohol and with a girl hanging off him. In the parking lot she accuses him of being drunk, before telling him to never call her again. Cole returns to the party, where he receives his birthday present: a reunion with his Mustang that he had been wanting, and the reunion with his parents that he had not.

After some words of advice from his friend, Leon, and a phone call to Grace, Cole takes his parents out for dinner. Later, while performing, Cole is punched by his ex-band member's sister who appears from the crowd. He is then taken to Jeremy's house to get cleaned up. After seeing the happiness Jeremy has surrounded himself with, Cole decides to show his genuine self. Eventually, he and Isabel begin dating, finally announcing their love for each other decidedly in front of the cameras.

== Major characters ==
=== Grace Brisbane ===
Grace was saved from the wolves by Sam and grows up feeling connected to his wolf form, calling him "her wolf". She is very against any mention of a cull for the wolves and is not afraid to say so publicly, even in the wake of Jack Culpeper's supposed death. She often feels that she is more grown-up than her impulsive and unreliable parents and dreams of being able to live alone with a red kettle. After meeting Sam in his human form, she falls in love with him and they begin dating. Her story is happening in parallel to Sam's, but as he loses his humanity in "Shiver", she embraces the wolves and once Sam stabilises in "Linger", Grace begins to lose herself. In "Forever", she considers undergoing bacterial meningitis to become human again at the end of Forever so that she can go to college. She has dirty blonde hair and is the most beautiful girl Sam has ever seen; John Marx, the brother of Grace's close friend Olivia Marx, would also call her "good looking" as a pet name.

=== Sam Roth ===
Geoffrey Beck adopted Sam at age 11, after his birth parents tried to kill him after discovering he had become a werewolf. He met Grace and they begin dating, gradually falling in love. He fears that each transformation could be his last and he could be stuck as a wolf forever, and small moments of being human with her are extremely precious to him. Isabel injects him with bacterial meningitis as a possible cure to control his body temperature and keep him human, and though it works, he feels guilty that Grace is going through the same thing. After Grace disappears as a wolf, he vows to find her again. When the wolves are under threat, he is injected so that he can turn into a wolf again to help move them into a safer location, though he ends the series as a human. He often puts his feelings into lyrics, and admires the poetry of Rainer Maria Rilke. He has a dark mop of hair and yellow eyes; Cole describes him as being a yellow-eyed John Lennon and Grace thinks he looks everything but nothing like his wolf form at the same time.

=== Isabel Culpeper ===
Her character was introduced as being Jack's sister in Shiver, and she later becomes a narrator in Linger, Forever and Sinner. She moved to Mercy Falls from California when she was 14. After discovering that Jack was a werewolf, she helped Grace with Sam, growing very close to her. Isabel is extremely smart and suggested bacterial meningitis as a cure, which killed her brother but saved Sam. Although originally portrayed as a cold person, Isabel begins to show her more vulnerable side, especially in her friendship with Grace. Isabel is attracted to Cole, but she is hesitant to start a relationship with him knowing that they are both damaged and can be cruel or self-destructive. Isabel stops a wolf hunt by refusing to leave the scene, resulting in her being sent back to California. When Cole calls her to say goodbye, she tells him to keep her number. Grace says that Isabel has is very good looking, typical of a Culpeper, and Cole describes her as being drop dead gorgeous the first time he sees her. She has blue eyes and blonde hair, though her long ringlets are cut short and jagged at the start of Linger.

=== Cole St Clair ===
Cole was turned into a wolf by Beck along with his bandmate Victor and an unknown girl. He was introduced in Linger and was a narrator for Linger, Forever and Sinner. He is a suicidal rock star who comes to Mercy Falls in search of anonymity and oblivion, and is always looking for the next thrill. He survives the transformation, but Victor is shot and killed in his wolf form, and Cole carries the guilt with him into "Forever" and "Sinner". Cole is running away from his life in music (the opposite of Sam, who turns to music as a way to make small moments matter), but the music was a way to run away from his father's high expectations. Because of his memories of his father's career as a doctor, he managed to find injections that could influence transformation, and he was the one to discover that it was adrenaline, not temperature, to trigger a transformation. He has brown hair and green eyes, described by Isabel and Grace as being very good looking. Cole is the lead singer of the famous band NARKOTIKA.

=== Shelby ===
Shelby is a troubled werewolf in the pack who was sexually abused in her human life. She was a narrator in Forever. Beck turned her because he felt sorry for her. As a wolf, she was supposedly the dominant female. However, she was infatuated with Sam and wanted him to be beside her (as he would have been the dominant male), often trying to kill Sam's girlfriend, Grace, of whom she was jealous. She was the one to turn Jack and kill Olivia. After attacking Cole, both of them are shot, but only Shelby dies. She had white blonde hair and Grace called her "beautiful with deep, soulful eyes"; she also has a strong southern accent as a human.

== Film adaptation ==
Shiver had been considered for film adaptation by Paramount Pictures, although creative differences meant the project was not continued. Maggie Stiefvater has stated that she has not completely disregarded the option to adapt the first novel of the series into a film, but has stated that it shall not be occurring in the near future. Believing that the film industry would limit her power over the production of Shiver's movie counterpart, she has also stated that she would prefer for there to be no movie made.

In March 2023, Addam Bramich's Simple House Films acquired the film rights, and Andy Fickman was hired to direct the film, with Addam Bramich and Betsy Sullenger serving as producers.

However, in September 2024, Claire McCarthy was hired to direct, replacing Fickman as director, from a script she co-wrote with Maggie and Jett Tattersall.

In November 2024, Maddie Ziegler and Levi Miller were cast in the lead roles, with filming planned to commence in Vancouver that month. Filming was halted in December 2024, when Simple House Films – after weeks of failing to meet full funding commitments to the production company it contracted to make the film – stopped funding entirely.

== Recognition ==
=== Shiver ===
- Indies Choice Book Award Finalist ALA Best Books for Young Adults
- ALA Quick Pick for Reluctant Readers
- 2011 ALA Popular Paperbacks for Young Adults
- Amazon Top Ten Books for Teens
- Border's Original Voices Pick & Finalist
- Barnes & Noble 2009 Top Twenty Books for Teens
- CBC Children's Choice Awards Finalist
- SIBA 2010 Book Award Finalist
- Glamour's Best Book to Curl Up With
- Winner, 2010 Midwest Booksellers’ Choice Award for Children's Literature
- Winner of the 2011 Georgia Peach Award
- VOYA: The Perfect Tens
- YALSA Teens’ Top Ten
- Silver Inky Award Winner (Australia)
- CO Blue Spruce Young Adult Book Award Nominees 2011
- FL Teens Read Award Nominees 2010–2011
- MD Black-Eyed Susan (High School) Book Award Nominees 2010–2011
- NC YA Book Award Booklist (High School) 2010–2011
- NH Flume Teen Reader's Choice Award Nominees (9–12) 2011
- The New York Times Bestseller #8 in Young Adult
- OR Young Adult Network Book Rave Reading List 2010
- PA Young Reader's Choice Award Nominees (Young Adult) 2010–2011
- TN Volunteer State Award Nominees Young Adult (7–12) 2011–2012
- 2011 NCSLMA Young Adult Book Award Nominee (North Carolina)
- 2010-2011 Pennsylvania Young Reader's Choice Award Nominee
- 2010 TAYSHAS Reading List (Texas)

=== Linger ===
- Debuted at #1 on The New York Times Bestseller List
- USA Today Bestseller
- Wall Street Journal Bestseller
- ABA Bestseller
- L.A. Times Bestseller
- Junior Library Guild Selection

=== Forever ===
- The New York Times Bestseller
- Amazon's Best Books of the Month, July 2011
