= On Sitting Down to Read King Lear Once Again =

"On Sitting Down to Read King Lear Once Again" is a sonnet by John Keats.

== Composition ==
The poem was composed in 1818, written in the margin of a replica of Shakespeare's works, and published posthumously on November 8, 1838 in The Plymouth and Devonport Weekly Journal. In a letter from January 23, 1818, Keats writes, "I sat down yesterday to read King Lear once again; the thing appeared to demand the prologue of a sonnet".

== Poem ==
O golden-tongued Romance with serene lute!
Fair plumed Syren! Queen of far away!
Leave melodizing on this wintry day,
Shut up thine olden pages, and be mute:
Adieu! for once again the fierce dispute,
Betwixt damnation and impassion'd clay
Must I burn through; once more humbly assay
The bitter-sweet of this Shakespearian fruit.
Chief Poet! and ye clouds of Albion,
Begetters of our deep eternal theme,
When through the old oak forest I am gone,
Let me not wander in a barren dream,
But when I am consumed in the fire,
Give me new Phoenix wings to fly at my desire.

=== Structure ===
The poem has a rhyme scheme of ABBA ABBA CDCD EE and is fourteen lines long.

== Response ==
It is arguable that King Lear was the most significant Shakespearean play for Keats, and it inspired him to move on from Endymion to begin working on Hyperion, which he said would be written in "a more naked and Grecian manner". Other scholars have argued that "On Sitting Down to Read King Lear Once Again" acts as one of Keats' 'review' poems - written in response to the burgeoning group of literary critics of the day, therefore placing it alongside poems like "On First Looking into Chapman's Homer". Others argue that the sonnet's position as a prologue places Keats in collaboration with Shakespeare, and that the poem indicates Keats' status as an active reader.

== See also ==
- John Keats bibliography
