= Feast of Saint Mark =

Feast day of Mark the Evangelist, 25 April

Saint Mark's Day, or the Feast of Saint Mark, commemorates Mark the Evangelist and takes place on April 25.

== Local observances and customs ==
=== Italy ===
The 25th of April is a national holiday throughout Italy, though not as Saint Mark's Day, but as anniversary of the liberation of Italy from the Nazi-Fascists in World War II (25 April 1945).

==== Sardinia ====
In Tresnuraghes, a small village in Sardinia (Italy), a traditional Sardinian feast is held. Local shepherd families in this predominantly pastoral community offer sheep and oversee cooking them in a gesture of thanks to Providence. Other families offer bread as thanksgiving or for favors desired. Hundreds of people, mostly from said village, but a large number of other people as well, eat and drink to satiation together.

==== Venice ====
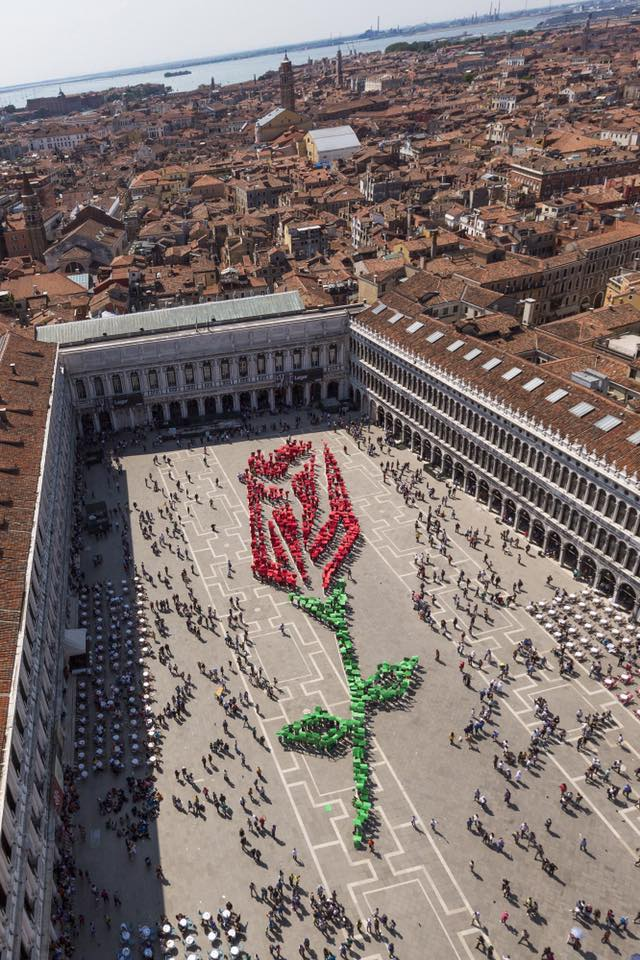
Festa del bocoło (rosebud festival) in St Mark's Square, Venice

The Feast of Saint Mark (Italian: Festa di san Marco), also known as the rosebud festival (Venetian: festa del bócoło), is a festival in Venice held on 25 April celebrating Venice's patron saint, Saint Mark. On this day, men traditionally give a single rosebud to the women they love.

According to legend, the tradition originated in the 8th century, when a man of low social standing is said to have fallen in love with a noblewoman from Venice. In order to win her father's approval, he became involved in a distant war. He was mortally wounded in battle, but managed to pluck a rose from a nearby rosebush for his loved one. A companion was entrusted with returning the blood-stained rose to his lover.

=== Lithuania ===
In Lithuania, St. Mark is considered the guardian of earth and harvests. There was a ban on eating meat in order to have a good harvest. People avoided "touching the earth", i.e. no plowing or digging, to give the earth a rest before the upcoming hard work of planting and harvest.

=== Mexico ===
This festivity is celebrated in the city of Aguascalientes, Mexico on the same date. It gives name to one of the most celebrated festivities, the Saint Mark National Fair (Spanish: Feria Nacional de San Marcos) which runs generally for three weeks around this date.

Also, in Paraíso, Tabasco, Mexico, Saint Mark is celebrated the 25 April due to his patronage of that city.

== See also ==
- Saint Mark's Eve
- Calendar of saints
