= Maggie Stiefvater =

American author (born 1981)

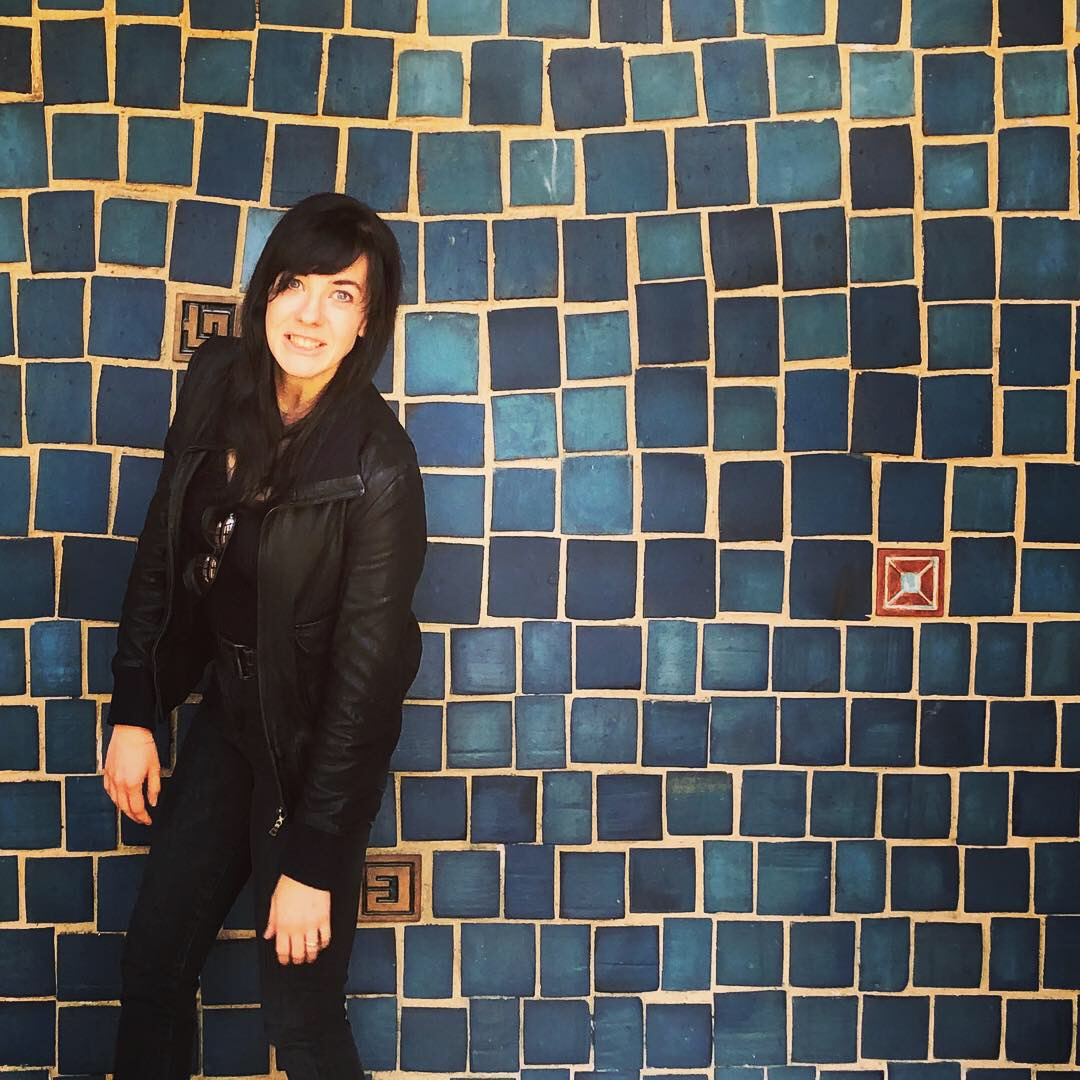
- Born: Heidi Hummel; November 18, 1981 (age 44); Harrisonburg, Virginia, U.S.
- Education: University of Mary Washington (BA)
- Occupation: Author
- Spouse: Edward Stiefvater
- Children: 2
- Writing career
- Years active: 2008–present
- Genres: Fantasy; young adult fiction; historical fiction
- Notable works: The Wolves of Mercy Falls; The Scorpio Races; The Raven Cycle
- Website: maggiestiefvater.com

Margaret Stiefvater (/ˈstiːvɑːtər/ STEE-vah-tər; née Heidi Hummel; born November 18, 1981) is an American author who is best known for her young adult fantasy series The Wolves of Mercy Falls and The Raven Cycle.

== Life and career ==
=== Early life and education ===
Maggie Stiefvater was born Heidi Hummel on November 18, 1981, in Harrisonburg, Virginia. At age sixteen, she legally changed her first name to Margaret. As a child, Stiefvater was a voracious reader who enjoyed writing. By age sixteen, she was submitting manuscripts to publishers. After being home-schooled from sixth grade on, Stiefvater attended Mary Washington College, graduating with a B.A. in history. By the time she had entered college, she had already written over thirty novels, including four thrillers about the Irish Republican Army, a historical blockade runner novel, and a high-fantasy novel about "impassioned enchanters fighting among civil unrest." After graduating, she worked as a portrait artist, specializing in equestrian art.

In 2010, she gave a TEDx Talk for NASA entitled "How Bad Teens Become Famous People", in which she reflects on her youth as a "Bad Teen" and how those years have impacted her.

=== Writing career ===
Stiefvater published her first novel, Lament, in 2008. Before Lament had been released, she sold the rights to its sequel, Ballad, and to Shiver, the first book in her The Wolves of Mercy Falls trilogy. She published Ballad in 2009. That same year, she published Shiver, which spent more than forty weeks on The New York Times Best Seller list. In 2010, she published the sequel, Linger. In 2011, she published Forever, the third novel of the trilogy. There are over 1.7 million copies of The Wolves of Mercy Falls series in print and more than thirty-six foreign editions have been licensed.

In 2011, Stiefvater published The Scorpio Races, which received five starred reviews and was named a Michael L. Printz Award Honor Book. In 2012, she published The Raven Boys, the first novel in her series The Raven Cycle. In 2013, she published the second novel, The Dream Thieves. In 2014, she published Sinner, a spin-off novel to The Wolves of Mercy Falls trilogy about two of the supporting characters after the events of Forever, and Blue Lily, Lily Blue, the third novel of The Raven Cycle. In 2016, she published The Raven King, the fourth and final novel. The Raven Cycle was adapted into a graphic novel in 2025, and The Dream Thieves followed in 2026.

In 2017, she published All the Crooked Saints. Between 2019 and 2022, she published The Dreamer Trilogy, three novels set in the world of The Raven Cycle after the events of The Raven King. In 2022, she also published Bravely, the sequel to the 2012 Pixar film Brave.

In 2025, Stiefvater published The Listeners, her first novel for adults.

Stiefvater has written on her blog about her techniques and methods when writing. In 2018 and 2019, Stiefvater gave writing seminars entitled Portraits & Dreams: Writing with Maggie Stiefvater. It included a lecture and a Q&A. She gave this lecture in Edinburgh, New York City, Seattle, Austin, Los Angeles, Brooklyn, Toronto, and Vancouver.

=== Music ===
Stiefvater plays various musical instruments. She recorded original compositions for the audio books of The Scorpio Races and The Raven Cycle. She has a SoundCloud account where she releases her original tracks. Stiefvater has released playlists for some of her novels of songs she listened to while writing.

=== Art ===
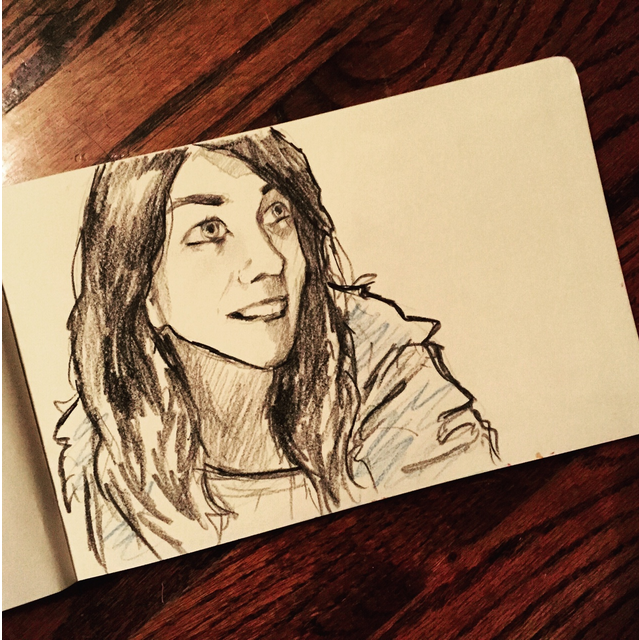
Self-portrait

Before turning to writing full-time, Stiefvater was a professional portrait artist, specializing in colored pencil.

Stiefvater created a tarot card deck, The Raven's Prophecy Tarot Cards, in September 2015.

She was asked to create a poster for the American Library Association to promote reading. The poster includes characters from The Raven Cycle and the phrase "The future belongs to those who read."

=== Cars ===
Stiefvater greatly enjoys cars, especially fast ones. She has completed a stunt driving class. She has worked as an automotive journalist.

Stiefvater has frequently used her passion for vehicles to promote her novels. To promote the second book of The Raven Cycle, The Dream Thieves, Stiefvater spray-painted her own car. She later allowed fans to also spray-paint the vehicle at the book's launch in Kansas City on September 18, 2013. She repeated this for another event in October 2016, where she let fans paint her Mitsubishi Lancer Evolution X. In 2013, Stiefvater went rally racing in a race car printed with the cover of The Raven Boys.

In 2015, Stiefvater drove her Mitsubishi Lancer Evolution X in a race against fellow author John Green at the Princeton Speedway in Princeton, Minnesota. Both of their vehicles caught fire.

=== Personal life ===
Stiefvater is married to Edward Stiefvater, with whom she has two children. The two became engaged when she was nineteen. On social media, she refers to her husband as Lover and her children as Thing 1 and Thing 2.

== Awards and nominations ==
Award	Year	Category	Work	Result	Ref.
Bram Stoker Award	2012	Young Adult Novel	The Raven Boys	Nominated	
Locus Award	2013	Young Adult Book	The Raven Boys	Nominated	
Locus Award	2014	Young Adult Book	The Dream Thieves	Nominated	
Locus Award	2015	Young Adult Book	Blue Lily, Lily Blue	Nominated	
Michael L. Printz Award	2012	—N/a	The Scorpio Races	Honor	
Mythopoeic Award	2012	Children's Literature	The Scorpio Races	Nominated	
Mythopoeic Award	2017	Adult Literature	The Raven Cycle	Nominated	

== Bibliography ==
=== Books of Faerie series ===
1. Lament: The Faerie Queen's Deception (2008)
2. Ballad: A Gathering of Faerie (2009)

=== The Wolves of Mercy Falls series ===
1. Shiver (2009)
2. Linger (2010)
3. Forever (2011)
- Sinner (2014)

=== The Raven Cycle series ===
1. The Raven Boys (2012)
2. The Dream Thieves (2013)
3. Blue Lily, Lily Blue (2014)
4. The Raven King (2016)
- Opal (a Raven Cycle Story) (2018), novella
- "Recurring" (a Ronan Lynch short story) (2024), short story

=== The Dreamer Trilogy ===
1. Call Down The Hawk (2019)
2. Mister Impossible (2021)
3. Greywaren (2022)

=== Pip Bartlett series ===
1. Pip Bartlett's Guide to Magical Creatures (2015), with Jackson Pearce
2. Pip Bartlett's Guide to Unicorn Training (2017), with Jackson Pearce
3. Pip Bartlett's Guide to Sea Monsters (2018), with Jackson Pearce

=== Other novels ===
- The Scorpio Races (2011)
- Spirit Animals Book 2: Hunted (2014)
- All the Crooked Saints (2017)
- Bravely (2022)
- The Listeners (2025)

=== Anthologies ===
- An Infinite Thread: A Merry Sisters of Fate Anthology (2008), with Tessa Gratton and Brenna Yovanoff
- The Curiosities: A Collection of Stories (2012), with Tessa Gratton and Brenna Yovanoff
  - "A Murder of Gods" (2009)
  - "A History of Love" (2009)
  - "The Wind Takes Our Cries" (2010)
  - "The Deadlier of the Species" (2010)
  - "The Last Day of Spring" (2009)
  - "Philosopher's Flight" (2010)
  - "Rain Maker" (2008)
  - "Council of Youth" (2008)
  - "Heart-Shaped Box" (2008)
  - "Another Sun" (2012)
- The Anatomy of Curiosity (2015), with Tessa Gratton and Brenna Yovanoff
  - "Ladylike" (2015)

=== Short stories ===
- "The Hounds of Ulster", published in Kiss Me Deadly: 13 Tales of Paranormal Love (2010)
- "Non Quis, Sed Quid", published in Demons: Encounters with the Devil and His Minions, Fallen Angels, and the Possessed (2011)
- "State of Mind", published in Wink: Young Adult Tales that Wink at Classic Children's Books (2024)

=== Graphic novel ===
- Swamp Thing: Twin Branches (2020), with artist Morgan Beem
- The Raven Boys (2025), with artist Sas Milledge
- The Dream Thieves (2026), with artist Sas Milledge

=== Non-fiction ===
- "L.A. Confidential" (February 10, 2012 online), published in The New York Times Book Review (February 12, 2012)
- "Driving Porsches On Ice, Finding The Inside Edge" (February 3, 2016), for Yahoo! Auto
- "Why I Fuck Up My Cars" (May 11, 2016), for Jalopnik
- "Why The Hell Do We Drive?" (June 22, 2016), for Jalopnik
- "Drive Your Fucking Classic Car" (July 21, 2016), for Jalopnik
- "How Not To Be Afraid Of Driving" (August 22, 2016), for Jalopnik
- "Automotive Suffering Is Good For Kids" (September 27, 2016), for Jalopnik
- "Why You Should Give Your Car A Shitty Paint Job" (June 1, 2017), for Jalopnik
- "Sexualized Language Colors Women's Role in Auto World" (October 22, 2017), for Automotive News
- "The Rolls-Royce Cullinan Is Spectacular" (October 19, 2018 online), published in Road & Track (June 2018)
- "Driving the Last Brand-New Mitsubishi Evo to its Grave" (January 10, 2019 online), published as "The King and I" in Road & Track (November 2018)
- "Proper Cool", published in Road & Track (March/April 2019)
- "Dancing in the Dark", published in Road & Track (September 2019)

== Film adaptations ==
In association with Paramount, Unique Features optioned Shiver's film rights shortly after the book was released. A screenplay was written by Nick Pustay. The film was in production in late 2024.

It was reported in 2011 that David Katzenberg and Seth Grahame-Smith’s KatzSmith Productions would produce a film of Scorpio Races. New Line Cinema, in conjunction with Weed Road, optioned the film rights for The Raven Boys shortly before the book's release in September 2012.

In 2019, Stiefvater wrote the pilot for a TV show of The Raven Cycle.

== Recognition ==
=== Shiver ===
- Debuted at #9 on the New York Times bestseller list
- Indies Choice Book Award Finalist
- ALA 2010 Best Books for Young Adults
- Publishers Weekly Best Books of 2009
- Border's Original Voices Pick & Finalist
- CBC Children's Choice Awards Finalist
- 2010 SIBA Book Award, Finalist
- VOYA's Perfect Ten, 2009
- BDB Top Young Reads of 2009

=== Lament ===
- ALA 2010 Best Books for Young Adults
- SIBA Book Award Nominee
- Starred review, Publishers Weekly
- Starred review, Booklist
- Starred review, KLIATT

=== The Scorpio Races ===
- The Odyssey Honor Award 2012 for Best Audio Production
- Los Angeles Times Book Times Award Finalist, 2012
- ALA Notable Books for Children, 2012
- The New York Times Notable Children's Books of 2011
- Publishers Weekly Best Children's Books of 2011
- Chicago Public Library's Best of the Best, 2012
- School Library Journal's Best Books of the Year
- Kirkus' Best Teen Books of the Year (2011)
- Horn Book Best Books of 2011
- Children's Book Committee 2012 Best Children's Books of the Year
- YALSA Top Ten Best Fiction for Young Adults, 2012
- YALSA Amazing Audiobooks for Young Adults, 2012
- 2012 NCTE/ CLA Notable Children's Book in the English Language Arts

=== The Raven Boys ===
- Number 1 NYT Bestselling Series
- Junior Library Guild Selection
- Autumn 2012 Kids' Indie Next List Pick
- Winner of AudioFile Earphones Award

=== The Dream Thieves ===
- Detcon1 Member Choice Award for Young Adult Fiction
- School Library Journal's Best Books of 2013
- Chapters-Indigo Best Books of 2013

=== Blue Lily, Lily Blue ===
- Publishers Weekly Best Books of 2012
- Junior Library Guild Selection
- 2013 YALSA Top Ten Best Fiction for Young Adults
- Autumn 2012 Kids' Indie Next List Pick
- Winner of AudioFile Earphones Award
- Audiofile's Best Audiobooks of the Year for 2012
- Indigo Top 25 of 2012
- BCCB Blue Ribbons 2012
- Leserpreis 2013, Best Fantasy
- One of Rolling Stone's Best 40 YA Novels
