= The Eve of Saint Mark (poem) =

Poem by John Keats

- by John Keats
- Written: 1819
- Language: English
- Genre: poem (unfinished)

The Eve of Saint (St.) Mark is an English language poem by John Keats. It was left unfinished in 1819. It is related to his earlier poem written in the same year, The Eve of Saint Agnes.

== Legend ==
St. Mark's Eve falls on April 24, the day before the feast day of St. Mark the Evangelist. In northern English folklore, it was believed that if a person took up watch in the church porch on St. Mark's Eve one would see the spectres of those destined to die during the year pass into the church.

Keats also mentions the legend in his fairy story, the Cap and Bells; here too, the young woman is named Bertha.

== Poem ==
Keats wrote this poem in February 1819, after The Eve of Saint Agnes but before La Belle Dame sans Merci. It opens, "Upon a Sabbath-day it fell;" and describes the streets of a cathedral town as the residents head to Evensong. Keats later described it as an attempt to create the "spirit of quietude". "I think I will give you the sensation of walking about an old country town in a coolish evening."

== See also ==
- John Keats bibliography
