= Sequoyah Book Award =

Literary awards

- Sequoyah Book Award Logo
- Formation: 1959
- Website: Sequoyah Book Awards

The Sequoyah Book Award is a set of three annual awards for books selected by vote of Oklahoma students in elementary, middle, and high schools. The award program is named after Sequoyah (c. 1770–1843), the Cherokee man who developed the Cherokee syllabary—a writing system adopted by Cherokee Nation in 1825. The awards are sponsored by the Oklahoma Library Association and administered by a committee of OLA members. Every year, three teams representing each award read and select books to be included on the master lists, which are then provided to Oklahoma schools for students to read and vote on. The winners are announced early spring of each year, and the winning authors are invited to the Association's annual conference to receive their awards and meet with students. The Sequoyah Children's Book Award, now voted by children in grades 3 to 5, was inaugurated in 1959. It is the third oldest U.S. state children's choice award after the original Kansas award and Vermont award. The Sequoyah Intermediate Book Award is voted by grades 6 to 8. It dates from 1988 where it was originally named the Young Adult award. Finally in 2010, the Sequoyah High School Book Award (grades 9–12) was added to the program.

The Sequoyah Committee also selects the Donna Norvell Award; The Donna Norvell Book Award was established in 2005 by the Oklahoma Library Association and is given annually, with the first award given in 2006. The Donna Norvell Book Award honors a book that has made a significant contribution to the field of literature for children through second grade. Until 2020, this award was a librarian's choice award and selected by librarians who were members of the Oklahoma Library Association's Sequoyah Book Award Committee. It is now a children's choice award for students in grades 2 and under, with the Children's Sequoyah Committee selecting the award nominees. The award is named for Donna Norvell, Children's Consultant for the Oklahoma Department of Libraries from 1992 to 2004, who died in 2004. The award honors Donna's contributions to the development of the library profession in Oklahoma.

== Children's winners ==
Year	Title	Author
1959	Old Yeller	Fred Gipson
1960	Black Gold	Marguerite Henry
1961	Have Space Suit—Will Travel	Robert A. Heinlein
1962	The Helen Keller Story	Catherine O. Peare
1963	Mystery of the Haunted Pool	Phyllis Whitney
1964	Where the Panther Screams	William Powell Robinson
1965	A Wrinkle in Time	Madeleine L'Engle
1966	Rascal	Sterling North
1967	Harriet the Spy	Louise Fitzhugh
1968	Gentle Ben	Walt Morey
1969	Blackbeard's Ghost	Ben Stahl
1970	Mustang	Marguerite Henry
1971	Ramona the Pest	Beverly Cleary
1972	Man in the Box	Mary Lois Dunn
1973	The Trumpet of the Swan	E. B. White
1974	Flight of the White Wolf	Mel Ellis
1975	Tales of a Fourth Grade Nothing	Judy Blume
1976	How to Eat Fried Worms	Thomas Rockwell
1977	The Toothpaste Millionaire	Jean Merrill
1978	Shoeshine Girl	Clyde Robert Bulla
1979	Summer of the Monkeys	Wilson Rawls
1980	Kid Power	Susan B. Pfeffer
1981	Get-Away Car	Eleanor Clymer
1982	Bunnicula	James Howe
1983	A Dog Called Kitty	Bill Wallace
1984	The Cybil War	Betsy Byars
1985	Thirteen Ways to Sink a Sub	Jamie Gilson
1986	Dear Mr. Henshaw	Beverly Cleary
1986	Just Tell Me When We're Dead	Eth Clifford
1987	Night of the Twisters	Ivy Ruckman
1988	Christina's Ghost	Betty Ren Wright
1989	The Sixth Grade Sleepover	Eve Bunting
1990	Fudge	Charlotte Graeber
1991	Beauty	Bill Wallace
1992	The Doll in the Garden	Mary Downing Hahn
1993	Weasel	Cynthia DeFelice
1994	Shiloh	Phyllis Reynolds Naylor
1995	Horror at the Haunted House	Peg Kehret
1996	The Ghosts of Mercy Manor	Betty Ren Wright
1997	Nasty, Stinky Sneakers	Eve Bunting
1998	Titanic Crossing	Barbara Williams
1999	101 Ways to Bug Your Parents	Lee Wardlaw
2000	The Million Dollar Shot	Dan Gutman
2001	Holes	Louis Sachar
2002	Dork in Disguise	Carol Gorman
2003	Because of Winn-Dixie	Kate DiCamillo
2004	Skeleton Man	Joseph Bruchac
2005	The Stranger Next Door	Peg Kehret
2006	The Tale of Despereaux	Kate DiCamillo
2007	The World According to Humphrey	Betty Birney
2008	Angus and Sadie	Cynthia Voigt
2009	Clementine	Sara Pennypacker
2010	Lawn Boy	Gary Paulsen
2011	All the Lovely Bad Ones	Mary Downing Hahn
2012	Dragonbreath	Ursula Vernon
2013	The Strange Case of Origami Yoda	Tom Angleberger
2014	Sidekicks	Dan Santat
2015	The One and Only Ivan	Katherine Applegate
2016	Chews Your Destiny: The Gumazing Gum Girl!	Rhode Montijo
2017	The Doll Graveyard	Lois Ruby
2018	Roller Girl	Victoria Jamieson
2019	A Dog Like Daisy	Kristin O’Donnell Tubb
2020	Lifeboat 12	Susan Hood
2021	Stargazing	Jen Wang
2022	Zeus, Dog of Chaos	Kristin O’Donnell Tubb
2023	Stella	McCall Hoyle
2024	Cookies and Milk	Shawn Amos
2025	Dogtown	Katherine Applegate and Gennifer Choldenko

== Young Adult and Intermediate winners ==
Year	Title	Author
1988	Abby My Love	Hadley Irwin
1989	The Other Side of Dark	Joan Lowery Nixon
1990	Hatchet	Gary Paulsen
1991	A Sudden Silence	Eve Bunting
1992	Appointment with a Stranger	Jean Thesman
1993	The Silver Kiss	Annette Curtis Klause
1994	What Daddy Did	Neal Shusterman
1995	Flight 116 Is Down	Caroline B. Cooney
1996	The Giver	Lois Lowry
1997	Walk Two Moons	Sharon Creech
1998	Running Out of Time	Margaret Peterson Haddix
1999	Danger Zone	David Klass
2000	I Have Lived a Thousand Years	Livia Bitton-Jackson
2001	Holes	Louis Sachar
2002	Speak	Laurie Halse Anderson
2003	Define Normal	Julie Ann Peters
2004	Sisterhood of the Traveling Pants	Ann Brashares
2005	The House of the Scorpion	Nancy Farmer
2006	Eragon	Christopher Paolini
2007	Red Kayak	Priscilla Cummings
2008	The Lightning Thief	Rick Riordan
2009	Runaway	Wendelin Van Draanen
2010	Unwind	Neal Shusterman
2011	The Hunger Games	Suzanne Collins
2012	Positively	Courtney Sheinmel
2013	After Ever After	Jordan Sonnenblick
2014	Michael Vey: Prisoner of Cell 25	Richard Paul Evans
2015	The False Prince	Jennifer A. Nielsen
2016	Goodbye, Rebel Blue	Shelley Coriell
2017	The Crossover	Kwame Alexander
2018	The War that Saved My Life	Kimberly Brubaker Bradley
2019	Refugee	Alan Gratz
2020	Front Desk	Kelly Yang
2021	Allies	Alan Gratz
2022	When Stars Are Scattered	Victoria Jamieson & Omar Mohamed
2023	Ground Zero	Alan Gratz
2024	Hummingbird	Natalie Lloyd
2025	The Lost Year	Katherine Marsh
2025	Parachute Kids	Betty C. Tang

== High School winners ==
Year	Title	Author
2010	Thirteen Reasons Why	Jay Asher
2011	The Hunger Games	Suzanne Collins
2012	Hate List	Jennifer Brown
2013	Clockwork Angel	Cassandra Clare
2014	Divergent	Veronica Roth
2015	The Fault in Our Stars	John Green
2016	The 5th Wave	Rick Yancey
2017	Wolf by Wolf	Ryan Graudin
2018	The Female of the Species	Mindy McGinnis
2019	The Hate U Give	Angie Thomas
2020	Dry	Neal Shusterman and Jarrod Shusterman
2021	The Patron Saints of Nothing	Randy Ribay
2022	Legendborn	Tracy Deonn
2023	Six Crimson Cranes	Elizabeth Lim
2024	Message Note Found	Dante Medema
2025	Rez Ball	Byron Graves

== Donna Norvell Award winners ==
The Norvell Award "honors a book making a significant contribution to the field of literature for children through third grade ... written and illustrated to present, organize, and interpret material for children." The writer and illustrator must be US residents, the book published two years before the award year (2012 publications in 2014). Librarians on the Sequoyah Committee select the winner.

Year	Title	Writer	Illustrator
2006	Wild About Books	Judy Sierra	Marc Brown
2007	Leaf Man	Lois Ehlert	Ehlert
2008	Not a Box	Antoinette Portis	Portis
2009	Fred Stays with Me!	Nancy Coffelt	Tricia Tusa ‡
2010	Maybe a Bear Ate It!	Robie Harris	Michael Emberley ‡
2011	Chicken Dance	Tammi Sauer	Dan Santat ‡
2012	Interrupting Chicken	David Ezra Stein	Stein
2013	Pete the Cat: Rocking in My School Shoes (sequel to Pete the Cat)	Eric Litwin	James Dean ‡
2017	Red, a Crayon's Story	Michael Hall
2018	The Legend of Rock Paper Scissors	Drew Daywalt	Adam Rex
2019	Can I Be Your Dog?	Troy Cummings
2020	Nobody Hugs a Cactus	Carter Goodrich
2021	Memoirs of a Tortoise	Devin Scillian	Tim Bowers
2022	The Worrysaurus	Rachel Bright	Chris Chatterton
2023	Summertime Sleepers	Melissa Stewart
2024	Feathers Together	Caron Levis	Charles Santoso
2025	Stickler Loves the World	Lane Smith

‡ The official award webpage identifies only the title and writer.
