= Rebecca Caudill Young Readers' Book Award =

American children's literature award

The Rebecca Caudill Young Readers' Book Award (RCYRBA) is an annual award given to the author of the book voted most outstanding by students in grades four through eight in participating Illinois schools and libraries. It is named in honor of children's author Rebecca Caudill, who lived and worked in Urbana, Illinois, and has been presented annually since 1988. It is administered by a volunteer board of directors and presented in cooperation with the Illinois Association of Teachers of English, the Illinois Reading Council, and the Illinois School Library Media Association.

Books honored by this award are selected by a popular vote taken of students between the fourth and eighth grades in the State of Illinois. Books are nominated two years in advance of a selection year by students, teachers, and school and public librarians. The nominations are narrowed down to twenty choices by the 70-80 member RCYRBA Evaluator's Committee, and put forward as that year's "Master List." Participating schools and public libraries then collect votes from children starting during the fall of the prior year, up through the end of February in the awarding year, and the award winner is announced each March.

== Winners ==
Rebecca Caudill Young Readers' Book Award winners
Year	Author	Title
1988	Lynne Reid Banks	The Indian in the Cupboard
1989	Betty Ren Wright	The Dollhouse Murders
1990	Mary Downing Hahn	Wait Till Helen Comes: A Ghost Story
1991	Roald Dahl	Matilda
1992	Lois Lowry	Number the Stars
1993	Jerry Spinelli	Maniac Magee
1994	Phyllis Reynolds Naylor	Shiloh
1995	Caroline Cooney	Flight Number 116 is Down
1996	Lois Lowry	The Giver
1997	Barbara Robinson	The Best School Year Ever
1998	Barbara Park	Mick Harte Was Here
1999	Andrew Clements	Frindle
2000	Gail Carson Levine	Ella Enchanted
2001	J. K. Rowling	Harry Potter and the Sorcerer's Stone
2002	Louis Sachar	Holes
2003	Laurie Halse Anderson	Fever, 1793
2004	Anthony Horowitz	Stormbreaker
2005	Carl Hiaasen	Hoot
2006	Christopher Paolini	Eragon
2007	Sarah Weeks	So B. It
2008	Jordan Sonnenblick	Drums, Girls, & Dangerous Pie
2009	Rick Riordan	The Lightning Thief
2010	Mary Downing Hahn	All the Lovely Bad Ones
2011	Suzanne Collins	The Hunger Games
2012	Matthew Cody	Powerless
2013	Raina Telgemeier	Smile
2014	R. J. Palacio	Wonder
2015	Marie Lu	Legend
2016	Richard Paul Evans	Michael Vey: The Prisoner of Cell 25
2017	Kwame Alexander	The Crossover
2018	Jennifer A. Nielsen	A Night Divided
2019	Jason Reynolds	Ghost
2020	Alan Gratz	Refugee
2021	Kelly Yang	Front Desk
2022	Dan Gemeinhart	The Remarkable Journey of Coyote Sunrise
2023	Victoria Jamieson and Omar Mohamed	When Stars Are Scattered
2024	Megan E. Freeman	Lone
2025	Jennifer Lynn Barnes	Inheritance Games
2026	Betty C. Tang	Parachute Kids
