= Indian Paintbrush Book Award =

American (Wyoming) children's book award

The Indian Paintbrush Book Award is an award given annually to books nominated and voted on by children in the fourth, fifth, and sixth grades in Wyoming. The award was first given in 1986. The award is sponsored by the Wyoming Library Association and the Wyoming State Reading Council.

The criteria for the award are:

- The book may be fiction or nonfiction
- The book must have been published within the past two years and must still be in print
- Any student may nominate a book
- No book may be nominated two consecutive years
- No book by a winning author may appear on the following year's list.

== Winners ==
	Winner	Author
1986	Naya Nuki: The Girl Who Ran	Kenneth Thomasma
1987	Hot and Cold Summer	Johanna Hurwitz
1988	The Dollhouse Murders	Betty Ren Wright
1989	The Return of the Indian	Lynne Reid Banks
1990	There's a Boy in the Girls' Bathroom	Louis Sachar
1991	Matilda	Roald Dhal
1992	Maniac Magee	Jerry Spinelli
1993	Pathki Nana: Kootenai Girl Solves a Mystery	Kenneth Thomasma
1994	Shiloh	Phyllis Reynolds Naylor
1995	Rescue Josh McGuire	Ben Mikaelsen
1996	Moho Wat: A Sheepeater Boy Attempts a Rescue	Kenneth Thomasma
1997	Watchdog and Coyotes	Bill Wallace
1998	Crash	Jerry Spinelli
1999	Saving Shiloh	Phyllis Reynolds Naylor
2000	Harry Potter and the Sorcerer's Stone	J.K. Rowling
2001	Holes	Louis Sachar
2002	Harry Potter and the Goblet of Fire	J.K. Rowling
2003	Among the Hidden	Margaret Peterson Haddix
2004	Harry Potter and the Prisoner of Azkaban	J.K. Rowling
2005	The Tale of Despereaux	Kate DiCamillo
2006	No Dogs Allowed!	Bill Wallace
2007	Dragon Rider	Cornelia Funke
2008	The Miraculous Journey of Edward Tulane	Kate DiCamillo
2009	Diary of a Wimpy Kid	Jeff Kinney
2010	Deep and Dark and Dangerous	Mary Downing Hahn
2011	The Candy Shop War	Brandon Mull
2012	The Red Pyramid	Rick Riordan
2013	Saving Zasha	Randi G. Barrow
2014	Wonder	R. J. Palacio
2015	The Iron Trial	Holly Black and Cassandra Clare
2016	A Night Divided	Jennifer A. Nielsen
2017	The Crossover	Kwame Alexander
2018	The War that Saved my Life	Kimberly Brubaker Bradley
2019	Hero	Jennifer Li Shotz
2020	The Trail	Meika Hashimoto
2021	New Kid	Jerry Craft
2022	My Life as a Potato	Arianne Costner
2023	Odder	Katherine Applegate
2024	Amari and the Night Brothers	B. B. Alston
