= The Crossover (TV series) =

2023 television series

- Genre: Sports drama; Coming of age
- Created by: Damani Johnson
- Based on: The Crossover by Kwame Alexander
- Starring: Jalyn Hall; Amir O’Neil; Derek Luke; Sabrina Revelle; Skyla I'Lece; Deja Monique Cruz; Trevor Raine Bush
- Narrated by: Daveed Diggs
- Country of origin: United States
- Original language: English
- No. of seasons: 1
- No. of episodes: 8

Production
- Executive producers: Kwame Alexander; Maverick Carter; Jamal Henderson; LeBron James; Alexander Johnson; Damani Johnson; Jay Marcus; Bob Teitel; George Tillman Jr.
- Editors: Ciarán Michael Vejby; Leah Breuer; Luis Colina; Michael Hathaway
- Production companies: Magicworthy; Big Sea Entertainment; SpringHill Entertainment; State St. Pictures; 20th Television

Original release
- Network: Disney+
- Release: April 5, 2023

The Crossover is an American sports drama television series based on the novel of the same name by Kwame Alexander. It was released on April 5, 2023 on Disney+.

It received two nominations at the 2nd Children's and Family Emmy Awards, winning Outstanding Young Teen Series.

== Premise ==
Brothers Josh and Jordan "JB" Bell are considered basketball phenomena, and navigate their lives entering adulthood as well as the growth of their family.

== Cast ==
=== Main ===
- Jalyn Hall as Josh Bell (nicknamed Filthy McNasty)
- Amir O'Neil as Jordan "JB" Bell
- Derek Luke as Chuck Bell
- Sabrina Revelle as Crystal Bell
- Skyla I'Lece as Alexis
- Deja Monique Cruz as Maya
- Trevor Raine Bush as Vondie

=== Recurring ===
- Himie Freeman as Future Josh
- Darone Okolie as Future JB
- Joel Steingold as Basil St. John
- Johnny Cantley as Future Vondie
- Yvonne Senat Jones as Janice
- Brandon Sutton as Gio
- Elijah Jacob as Zuma
- Will Koberg as Coach Howard

=== Guest ===
- Gabriela Lopez as Future Maya

== Episodes ==
No.	Title	Directed by	Teleplay by	Original release date
1	"X's & O's"	George Tillman, Jr.	Kwame Alexander & Damani Johnson	April 5, 2023
2	"The Cold Streak"	James Roday Rodriguez	Damani Johnson & Kwame Alexander	April 5, 2023
3	"One-On-One"	James Roday Rodriguez	Valerie C. Woods	April 5, 2023
4	"Time Out"	Nefertite Nguvu	Jake Lawler	April 5, 2023
5	"Huddle Up"	Nefertite Nguvu	Jasmine Swift	April 5, 2023
6	"Full-Court Press"	Erin O'Malley	Ali Kinney	April 5, 2023
7	"Clutch"	Erin O'Malley	Aaron Carter	April 5, 2023
8	"Rebound"	Cierra Glaude	Kwame Alexander & Valerie C. Woods	April 5, 2023

== Production ==
Disney+ ordered a pilot for the adaptation of the novel in May 2021, with Jalyn Hall and Amir O'Neil cast to star. In June, Derek Luke, Sabrina Revelle, Skyla I'Lece, Deja Monique Cruz and Trevor Raine Bush were added to the cast. The series was officially greenlit in January 2022, with LeBron James' production company SpringHill Entertainment joining the production. In February, Daveed Diggs was cast to narrate the series. In July, it was announced Darone Okolie, Gabriela Lopez, Joel Steingold, Himie Freeman, and Johnny Cantley were cast in recurring roles. Yvonne Senat Jones would also join in a recurring role in October. Filming began in June 2022.

On January 13, 2023, it was announced that the series would premiere on April 5, 2023 on Disney+. It was originally slated to premiere on April 4, 2023 on Disney Channel, but the show was suddenly removed from their programming schedule for unknown reasons.

== Reception ==
=== Critical response ===
Joel Keller of Decider stated, "The Crossover is a warm family dramedy with just enough of the drama part to keep us interested in following the Bells as they navigate life, school and hoops." Daniel Fienberg of The Hollywood Reporter complimented the performances of the cast and the emphasis on Afrocentric culture, writing, "The Crossover generates some satisfying emotional beats, blends its coming-of-age and adult storylines well and, as derivative as some of its individual pieces may feel, its overall voice is likably distinctive." Joyce Slaton of Common Sense Media gave the series a grade of 4 out of 5 stars, praised the presence of positive messages and role models, citing hard work, family values, and social emotion learning, and complimented the diverse representations, asserting, "Family-friendly sports drama scores with heartfelt emotions."

=== Accolades ===
The Crossover was nominated for Tweens/Teens Programming – Best New Series, and won Tweens/Teens Programming – Best Inclusivity at the 2024 Kidscreen Awards.

=== Awards and nominations ===
Year	Award	Category	Nominee(s)	Result	Refs
2023	Children's and Family Emmy Awards	Outstanding Young Teen Series	Kwame Alexander, Maverick Carter, Daveed Diggs, Kimberly Ann Harrison, Todd Harthan, Jamal Henderson, Lebron James, Damani Johnson, Jay Marcus, Erin O’Malley, Robert Prinz, Bob Teitel, George Tillman Jr., Lezlie Wills (executive producers); Valerie C. Woods (co-executive producer); Ali Kinney (supervising producer); Marsha L. Swinton (producer)	Won	
2023	Children's and Family Emmy Awards	Outstanding Writing for a Young Teen Program	Kwame Alexander, Damani Johnson, Valerie C. Woods, Ali Kinney, Aaron Carter, Jasmine Swift, Jake Lawler	Nominated	
