= Jennifer Nielsen =

Jennifer Nielsen may refer to:

- Jennifer Lalor Nielsen, American soccer player
- Jennifer A. Nielsen, American author
