= The Shadow Throne =

The Shadow Throne may refer to:

- The Shadow Throne, the third novel in the Ascendance Trilogy, a fantasy series by Jennifer A. Nielsen
- The Shadow Throne, the second novel in the Shadow Campaigns series by Django Wexler
- The Shadowthrone, the second studio album by Norwegian black metal band Satyricon
