= The False Prince =

The False Prince may refer to:

- The False Prince (novel), the first novel in the Ascendance Trilogy
- The False Prince (film), a 1927 German silent film
