= Notes from the Midnight Driver =

Novel by Jordan Sonnenblick

- First edition
- Author: Jordan Sonnenblick
- Language: English
- Genre: Young-Adult Fiction, Comedy
- Publisher: Scholastic
- Publication date: 2006
- Publication place: United States
- Pages: 288
- ISBN: 978-0-439-75779-9
- OCLC: 62127713
- LC Class: PZ7.S6984 Not 2006

Notes From the Midnight Driver is a young adult novel by Jordan Sonnenblick. It was published by Scholastic in 2006.

== Plot summary ==
Alexander "Alex" Peter Gregory is a 16-year-old boy, One night,while Alex is home alone, because his dad ran off with his third-grade teacher, he was drinking his dad's beer and became intoxicated. A bit later, while still intoxicated, he took his mother's car to pay his father a visit. However, he ends up hitting a lawn gnome and then later vomits on a police officer. To pay back the $500 from breaking the lawn gnome, Alex has to do 100 hours of community service at a nursing home. He is assigned to a man named Solomon, Alex is frustrated by Solomon, but the judge will not change his assignment.

Alex's best friend, Laurie, is a beautiful martial arts master. After meeting her, Solomon constantly teases Alex by calling Laurie his wife throughout the book. Solomon's comments about Laurie make Alex realize his feelings for her.

One day, Alex practices his guitar while waiting for Solomon and learns that the man used to be a jazz guitar player. They start to bond and Solomon begins to teach Alex and taught some valuable lessons in music and in life. Alex begins playing benefit concerts with Steven and Annette (from Sonnenblick's first book Drums, Girls, and Dangerous Pie) to give the residents something to look forward to in their dull lives. At one such concert, Solomon plays a rendition of Sunrise, Sunset causing the judge to have a very emotional reaction leading to the revelation that she is Solomon's daughter, Judy, from whom he has been estranged for many years. Solomon then dies the next day, and they host his funeral soon after.
