= Curveball (disambiguation) =

A curveball is a type of pitch used in the sport of baseball.

Curveball may also refer to:

- Curveball (film), a 2020 film
- Curveball (informant), code name for Rafid Ahmed Alwan al-Janabi (born 1968), Iraqi informant
- Curveball (Ugly Betty), an episode of the television series Ugly Betty
- Curveball: The Remarkable Story of Toni Stone the First Woman to Play Professional Baseball in the Negro League, a 2010 book by Martha Ackmann
- Curveball: The Year I Lost My Grip, a 2012 book by Jordan Sonnenblick
- CurveBall (security vulnerability)
