= Hate List =

Book by Jennifer Brown

- Author: Jennifer Brown
- Language: English
- Genre: Young Adult
- Publisher: Little, Brown Books for Young Readers
- Publication date: September 1, 2009
- Pages: 408 pp
- ISBN: 978-0316041454
- OCLC: 283802588

Hate List is a young adult novel written by Jennifer Brown and published in 2009 by Little, Brown Books for Young Readers. Jennifer Brown, who wrote a newspaper humor column for four years, switched to a more serious side for her debut novel, Hate List. The novel is set after a shooting incident at an American high school and deals with themes of hatred, bullying, family tension, and suicide.

== Plot summary ==
The novel deals with the aftermath of a school shooting. It is a first person narrative from the point of view of Valerie Leftman, whose boyfriend Nick Levil was the shooter. Interspersed through the novel are newspaper articles about the events.

Valerie and Nick have compiled a Hate List, a list of people and things they hate; Valerie sees it as an inside joke between the two of them, but Nick is more serious. When he brings a gun to school and starts shooting people, Valerie puts herself in front of his next victim, Jessica Campbell, and is shot in the leg. After this, Nick kills himself. Once Valerie wakes up in the hospital to face the consequences, she soon realizes that she harbors some of the blame for the people who were killed or wounded. Had she not discussed before how much she hated them? Maybe even egged him on a little? With Nick gone, she's really the only one left to face the blame. Six months after the shooting, Valerie returns to school and steadily begins to cope with the loss of her boyfriend, the loss of her former friends, her family's resulting issues, and how it all will affect her future. People now view Nick as a monster, her classmates are torn between calling her a victim or a part of the whole plan, her friends no longer talk to her, her parents' marriage is ending, her brother resents her, the girl whose life she saved befriends her, and she considers the possibility of attending college even though her name is attached to the tragedy. This novel follows her as she learns to forgive, to stand up for herself, and journey from mental anguish to mental stability.

== Awards ==
- American Library Association 2010 Best Books for Young Adults
- Young Adult Library Services Association 2012 Popular Paperback
- Michigan Library Association's Thumbs Up! Award
- 2012 Oklahoma Sequoyah Book Award
- A School Library Journal Best Book of 2009
- A 2009 Children’s Indie Next Pick
- A New York Public Library Book for the Teen Age
- A Young Adult Library Services Association Teens’ Top Ten Nominee
- A Bank Street Best Book of the Year
- A VOYA Perfect Ten
- A New Hampshire Flume Award nominee
- An Arkansas Teen Book Award Honorable Mention
- An Iowa High School Book Award finalist
- A Louisiana Teen Readers’ Choice Award Winner
- A Missouri Gateway Readers Award Winner
