= Not a Box =

Children's book

- Author: Antoinette Portis
- Cover artist: Antoinette Portis
- Language: English
- Genre: Children's
- Publisher: HarperCollins
- Publication date: 2006
- Publication place: United States
- Media type: Print
- Pages: 32 pp
- ISBN: 978-0-06-112322-1
- Preceded by: N/A
- Followed by: Not a Stick

Not a Box is a children's picture book written and illustrated by Antoinette Portis.

It was published by Harper Collins Publishers in 2006.

It is graded for Newborn to 6 years old. It received a 2007 Theodor Seuss Geisel Award Honor and a 2008 Donna Norvell Award.

An animated series based on the book was released on Apple TV+ (now Apple TV) on June 13, 2025. The episode "Not a Boat" competed at Annecy International Animation Film Festival in June 2026.

== Sequel ==
In 2008, Portis released a sequel to this book, Not a Stick.

== Bibliography ==
- Not a Box. HarperCollins. December 12, 2006. ISBN 978-0-06-112322-1. "not a box."
