= Out of Wonder =

2017 poetry collection by Kwame Alexander

- Author: Kwame Alexander
- Illustrator: Ekua Holmes
- Language: English
- Publisher: Candlewick Press
- Publication date: March 14, 2017
- Publication place: United States
- Awards: Coretta Scott King Illustrator Award (2018)
- ISBN: 9780763680947

Out of Wonder: Poems Celebrating Poets is a 2017 collection of poems for children's by Kwame Alexander with co-authors Chris Colderley and Marjory Wentworth and illustrated by Ekua Holmes. The book won the 2018 Coretta Scott King Illustrator Award. Each of the 20 poems is written in tribute to and in the style of a well known poet.

== Critical reception ==
Out of Wonder was well-received by critics, including starred reviews from Booklist, Kirkus Reviews, Publishers Weekly, and School Library Journal.

Booklist's Ilene Cooper highlighted how the book pays "tribute to well-known poets, such as Maya Angelou, e. e. cummings, Sandra Cisneros, Robert Frost, Gwendolyn Brooks, and William Carlos Williams, among others ... But even without such links, most of the poetry—breezy, thoughtful, amusing—stands on its own." Cooper further praised the illustrations: "Holmes takes collage work to a new level, with gloriously colored art that, the closer you look, tells further stories within stories. Each illustration captures not just the feeling of the poem but wakes readers up to life’s excitements and small joys." She concluded by stating, "Exemplary words and pictures make this a multicultural masterwork."

Kirkus called the book "a magnificent exploration of the poetic imagination."

Shelf Awareness's Emilie Coulter wrote, "Even readers who claim they don't enjoy poetry will be won over by these crystal-clear, mostly child-centric poems ... If that weren't enough, the gorgeous cut-paper artwork by Caldecott Honor artist Ekua Holmes ... takes the already exuberant book to an even higher plane."

== Awards and honors ==
Out of Wonder is a New York Times bestselling book. Kirkus Reviews named it one of the best books of the year, and Booklist included it on their "Top 10 Diverse Nonfiction for Youth" list.

Awards for Out of Wonder
| Year | Award | Result | Ref. |
|---|---|---|---|
| 2017 | Cybil Award for Poetry | Finalist | |
| 2017 | Booklist Editors' Choice: Books for Youth | Selection | |
| 2018 | Coretta Scott King Book Award for Illustrator | Winner | |
| 2018 | ALSC Notable Children's Books | Selection | |

Awards
| Preceded by Radiant Child: The Story of Young Artist Jean-Michel Basquiat | Coretta Scott King Illustrator Award; 2018 | Succeeded by |
