= The Christmas Box =

Book by Richard Paul Evans

- Author: Richard Paul Evans
- Publisher: Simon & Schuster
- Publication date: 1993
- ISBN: 9781566840286

The Christmas Box is an American novel written by Richard Paul Evans and self-published in 1993.

A Christmas story written for his children, the book was advertised locally by Evans, who was working at the time as an advertising executive. He placed the book in Utah stores and it became a local best-seller. This got the attention of major publishers who bid against each other, resulting in Evans receiving several million dollars for the publishing rights.

Released in hardcover in 1995 by Simon & Schuster, The Christmas Box became the first book to simultaneously reach the No.1 position on The New York Times bestseller list for both the paperback and hardcover editions.

== Television movie ==
That same year, the book was made into a television film of the same title starring Richard Thomas and Maureen O'Hara.

== See also ==
- List of Christmas films
- List of Christmas-themed literature
