= Michael Vey: Hunt for Jade Dragon =

2014 novel by Richard Paul Evans

- Author: Richard Paul Evans
- Original title: Michael Vey: Hunt for Jade Dragon
- Language: English
- Series: Michael Vey
- Genre: Science fiction
- Publisher: Simon Pulse, Mercury Ink
- Publication date: September 16, 2014
- Media type: Paperback, Hardcover
- Pages: 319
- ISBN: 978-1-4814-2438-7
- Preceded by: Michael Vey: Battle of the Ampere
- Followed by: Michael Vey: Storm of Lightning

Michael Vey: Hunt for Jade Dragon is the fourth book of the heptalogy series of books Michael Vey, written by Richard Paul Evans. The first book in the series, Michael Vey: The Prisoner of Cell 25, was #1 on the New York Times Best Seller list.

== Plot ==
The Electroclan travel from Peru to the Timepiece Ranch, owned by the voice. There, Michael, Ostin, and Taylor reunite with their parents. Everyone is briefed about their next mission to rescue Jade Dragon, a Chinese child prodigy who has discovered how to fix the MEI to make more electric children.

The resistance leaders ask Michael to recruit Nichelle, a glow formerly loyal to Hatch, to help combat Hatch's other electric children. Michael is reluctant at first, but ultimately decides to make her an offer. The night before the mission, Michael enlists the help of the parents set up a prom for Taylor after he hears her remorse over never being able to live a regular life.

The Electroclan fly back to Pasadena to approach Nichelle. After being bribed by Michael, Nichelle agrees to help them in order to get revenge on Hatch for leaving her to die. The Electroclan journey to Taiwan, but lose hope after seeing the seemingly impenetrable Starxource plant where Jade Dragon is held. They decide instead to rescue her when the Elgen transport her to their research boat, the Volta.

Zeus and Tessa are sent to a nearby Starxource plant as a distraction while the rest of the Electroclan is ordered to stay in the hotel, but they become bored and explore the local markets. However, both Nichelle and Taylor begin acting strangely. That night, Nichelle sees Hatch and seemingly sells out the rest of the Electroclan.

The Elgen attacks the hotel and captures the Electroclan. The "Taylor" who returned from the market was actually Tara, Taylor's twin sister who is loyal to Hatch. Michael is tortured by an Elgen guard until a man, seemingly Michael's supposedly dead father, stops him. They talk, Michael tells him about Timepiece Ranch, and his father states that the "Elgen are the good guys."

Nichelle visits Michael in his cell, and he attacks her. However, Nichelle reveals that she knew Tara had switched places with Taylor. She faked defecting and had the Electroclan kidnapped so they would have a shot at rescuing Jade Dragon, and because Hatch would have killed Taylor if they didn't do anything. Michael and Nichelle rescue most of the Electroclan.

While this is happening, Taylor is locked in Jade Dragon's cell. She manages to glean the information the Elgen want from Jade Dragon, but refuses to give it to the Elgen. The rest of the Electroclan show up, incapacitate Hatch's glows, and after a lengthy battle, escape the compound.

After meeting back up with Zeus and Tessa, the Clan regroups at a safe house. Ian reveals to Michael that the man he thought was his father was actually Hatch disguised by Tara. They tell the voice that Timepiece Ranch is compromised.

The Electroclan goes through with their original plan to rescue Jade Dragon while being transported, and they succeed. Michael and Taylor learn that Jade's parents were killed by the Elgen when she was kidnapped. Realizing that he can't bear the danger of losing those he loves anymore, Michael tells Taylor that he intends to leave when they return home. However, the Electroclan is shocked to learn that the Elgen have attacked Timepiece Ranch and that there are no survivors. Devastated, Michael demands to go to the Ranch despite the danger.

== Characters ==
- Michael Vey is the protagonist of the series. He is a teenager with Tourette's syndrome who is constantly bullied by his peers. Michael is a Glow, one of a few people who have electrical-based powers. His abilities allow him to "pulse" with electric energy, shocking people like an electric eel.
- Taylor Ridley is Michael's girlfriend and a cheerleader at Meridian High, whom Michael has a crush on. She is also a Glow who was undiscovered by Dr. Hatch. Her abilities allow her to scramble the electrical signals in brains, causing confusion. She can also read minds.
- Ostin Liss is Michael's best friend and is considered a genius.
- Dr. Hatch is a scientist who founded the Elgen Academy. He is the antagonist, who manipulates the Glows and exploits their powers for his personal glory and ambition.
- Jack Vranes is one of the bullies at Meridian High who, along with his friends Wade West and Mitchell Manchester, often targets Michael. Jack drives Michael to Pasadena to rescue Mrs. Vey and Taylor from Elgen Academy.
- Zeus has the ability to 'throw' lightning, getting his nickname from the ancient Greek god Zeus. Elgen abducted him as a little kid, killed his family, and told him that he did it.
- Nichelle is a Glow who is loyal to Dr. Hatch. Her ability allows her to suck away the power and energy from other Glows. The process is comparable to mosquitoes sucking blood from a host. Because of her nasty attitude and unique ability that only affects them, the other Glows at the Elgen Academy dislike her. She enjoys torturing others with her dark power.
- Ian is a Glow who is first introduced in Purgatory with McKenna and Abigail. He is blind, but his ability allows him to see through electrolocation, much like a bat.
- McKenna is a Glow who is first introduced in Purgatory with Ian and Abigail. She has the ability to create light and heat from her body.
- Abigail, is a Glow who is first introduced in Purgatory with Ian and McKenna. Her ability allows her to suppress pain by stimulating nerve endings through physical contact or conduction through metal.
- Grace acts as a “human flash drive,” and is able to transfer and store large amounts of electronic data. She was left behind after Dr. Hatch fled and joined the Electroclan.
- Tanner is one of the Glows under Dr. Hatch's control. He has the ability to interfere with an aircraft's navigation and electrical systems, shutting them down and making them crash. He has murdered thousands of people under Dr. Hatch's orders.
- Tara is Taylor's identical twin sister. Like with her sister Taylor, Tara's abilities deal with manipulation of the mind. She can stimulate different parts of the brain to elicit emotions such as fear and happiness.
- Quentin is another Glow under Dr. Hatch who has the ability to produce a small EMP, or electromagnetic pulse. He is loyal to Dr. Hatch and is shown to be reckless and impulsive.
- Bryan is a Glow under Dr. Hatch who has the ability to generate highly focused electricity that allows him to cut through solid objects, such as metal, by burning through them. He is loyal to Dr. Hatch, and is very reckless like Quentin.
- Kylee is another Glow under Dr. hatch who can act like a human magnet. She is loyal to Dr. Hatch and the Elgen.

== Sequel ==
The sequel of this book, Michael Vey: Storm of Lightning was published on September 15, 2015.
