= Christina's Ghost =

Book by Betty Ren Wright

- Author: Betty Ren Wright
- Original title: Christina's Ghost
- Illustrator: There are no illustrations
- Language: English
- Genre: Children's fiction
- Publisher: Scholastic inc
- Publication date: 1985
- Pages: 105
- ISBN: 0-590-70347-1
- OCLC: 11972698

Christina's Ghost is a novel written by Betty Ren Wright. It was published in 1985 by Scholastic Inc. It is found in over 2000 libraries.

== Synopsis ==
The book centers on 10-year-old tomboy Christina who, to her displeasure, has to spend her summer with her grumpy uncle after her grandmother becomes ill. Uncle Ralph is house sitting for a friend in an old, spooky, and isolated lake-side Victorian mansion. Once she gets there she finds a room that looks as if it had once belonged to a little boy. There she sees, for the first time, a little boy in a blue sailor suit, who disappears before Christina can talk to him. She also finds out that whatever she does, she cannot get inside the attic even though she hears noises coming from there. Christina decides she wants to know why the little boy is there. On a trip to the nearby city, Christina looks for old newspapers to see if she can find any information about the house. She finds a newspaper dated 30 years ago. It says that a murder took place in the house after a man stole some valuable stamps. The men whom he stole from found out where he was staying and went to kill him. The little boy was killed simply because he had witnessed the murder. One of the murderers confessed and said that they never found the stamps. When Christina gets back she sits down to read a comic book she had taken from the little boy's room. Suddenly she hears something descending from the attic. Once again she sees the boy, but this time his expression is of terror, pointing at the comic book Christina is reading. The stamps have been hidden in the boys comic book for 30 years. Christina and her uncle flee the house as the ghost of the sitter causes chaos. They manage to escape and spend the night in a nearby town. They turn the stamps in to the local sheriff's office the next morning. When they arrive back at the house, that morning, they find the doors and windows all open, the mustiness of the house gone, replaced with fresh air and bright sunlight. Upon further investigating, Christina concludes the ghost of the little boy is finally at peace now that the mystery surrounding his untimely death has been solved.

== Awards ==
- Sequoyah Children's Book Award (1988)
- Young Hoosier Book Award Nominee (Intermediate, 1988–1989)
- Young Hoosier Book Award Winner (Intermediate, 1988–1989)
- TASL Volunteer State Book Children's Choice Award (1989–1990)
