= Michael Vey: Battle of the Ampere =

Book by Richard Paul Evans

- The cover of the first edition.
- Author: Richard Paul Evans
- Original title: Michael Vey: Battle of the Ampere
- Language: English
- Series: Michael Vey
- Genre: Science fiction, Young adult
- Published: Simon Pulse, Mercury Ink
- Publication date: September 17, 2013
- Media type: Paperback
- Pages: 320
- ISBN: 978-1442475113
- Preceded by: Michael Vey: Rise of the Elgen
- Followed by: Michael Vey: Hunt for the Jade Dragon

Michael Vey: Battle of the Ampere is the third book of the seven book Michael Vey series, written by Richard Paul Evans. It was published on September 17, 2013 by Simon Pulse/Mercury Ink. The first book in the series, Michael Vey: The Prisoner of Cell 25, was #1 on the New York Times Best Seller list.

== Plot summary ==
Following where the previous book left off, Michael is held by a tribe of natives. During this time, he meets a new Glow, Tessa, who escaped from Hatch years prior, who is able to increase the powers of the other electric children. Michael and Tessa depart with a group of the natives to meet Jaime, the Electroclan's guide. Upon meeting Jaime, they travel to a camp, but are ambushed by Elgen guards. Michael uses a security turret to kill the guards and escape, destroying the camp. At the same time, the Peruvian army massacres the tribe for harboring terrorists.

Meanwhile, Taylor and the rest of the Electroclan have been captured by the Peruvian authorities for destroying the Elgen's power plant. While being interrogated, Taylor inadvertently tells the Elgen about the Voice that has been helping them. Ostin leads an escape attempt, but the group is quickly recaptured by the Elgen and the Peruvian army.

Aboard the Elgen flagship, the Ampere, the board of Elgen deposes of Hatch, only for Hatch and his loyal electric children to rebel and take over the board. Hatch reveals his plan to take over the island of Tuvalu as a base of operations to develop EMP weapons.

Michael, Tessa, and Jaime set a trap to disrupt the convoy carrying the rest of the Electroclan. They succeed, and Michael rescues everybody except Taylor and Jack, who were taken by an Elgen bounty hunter. The Electroclan rescues them, but Wade is killed by a stray Elgen Guard. After an improvised memorial service, they meet up with Jaime in a hotel.

Jaime takes the Electroclan to a safe house, where he and the voice explain Hatch's plan to take over Tuvalu. They determine the best course of action is to destroy the Elgen's flagship, the Ampere. However, Ian, Zeus, Abigail, and Tessa, who are tired of running, decide to leave. Michael, Taylor, Ostin, McKenna, and Jack attack the Ampere but are cornered in the ship's engine room. As they prepare to detonate the bomb manually, the Elgen's battleship Watt explodes and Tessa, Zeus, Abigail, and Ian return. The Ampere is then blown up while everyone escapes.

During a celebration for the mission's success, Taylor and Michael award Wade the Electroclan Medal of Valor to commemorate his sacrifice and to ease a grieving Jack. The voice allows Michael and Ostin to talk to their parents. The joy is cut short when it is revealed that Hatch escaped the ship before it blew and has kidnapped a child prodigy in China, known as Jade Dragon, who has figured out how to fix the MEI machine and create more electric children.

== Sequel ==
The sequel of this book, Michael Vey: Hunt for Jade Dragon was published on September 16, 2014.

== Characters ==
- Michael Vey is the protagonist of the series. He is a teenager with Tourette's syndrome who is constantly bullied by his peers. Michael is a Glow, one of a few people who have electrical-based powers. His abilities allow him to "pulse" with electric energy, shocking people like an electric eel.
- Taylor Ridley is Michael's girlfriend and a cheerleader at Meridian High, whom Michael has a crush on. She is also a Glow who was undiscovered by Dr. Hatch. Her abilities allow her to scramble the electrical signals in brains, causing confusion. She can also read minds.
- Ostin Liss is Michael's best friend and is considered a genius.
- Dr. Hatch is a scientist who founded the Elgen Academy. He is the antagonist, who manipulates the Glows and exploits their powers for his personal glory and ambition.
- Jack Vranes is one of the bullies at Meridian High who, along with his friends Wade West and Mitchell Manchester, often targets Michael. Jack drives Michael to Pasadena to rescue Mrs. Vey and Taylor from Elgen Academy.
- Zeus has the ability to 'throw' lightning, getting his nickname from the ancient Greek god Zeus. Elgen abducted him as a little kid, killed his family, and told him that he did it.
- Wade West is one of the bullies at Meridian High. Wade is a normal human who helped the Electroclan.
- Nichelle is a Glow who is loyal to Dr. Hatch. Her ability allows her to suck away the power and energy from other Glows. The process is comparable to mosquitoes sucking blood from a host. Because of her nasty attitude and unique ability that only affects them, the other Glows at the Elgen Academy dislike her. She enjoys torturing others with her dark power.
- Ian is a Glow who is first introduced in Purgatory with McKenna and Abigail. He is blind, but his ability allows him to see through electrolocation, much like a bat.
- McKenna is a Glow who is first introduced in Purgatory with Ian and Abigail. She has the ability to create light and heat from her body.
- Abigail, is a Glow who is first introduced in Purgatory with Ian and McKenna. Her ability allows her to suppress pain by stimulating nerve endings through physical contact or conduction through metal.
- Grace acts as a “human flash drive,” and is able to transfer and store large amounts of electronic data. She was left behind after Dr. Hatch fled and joined the Electroclan.
- Tanner is one of the Glows under Dr. Hatch's control. He has the ability to interfere with an aircraft's navigation and electrical systems, shutting them down and making them crash. He has murdered thousands of people under Dr. Hatch's orders.
- Tara is Taylor's identical twin sister. Like with her sister Taylor, Tara's abilities deal with manipulation of the mind. She can stimulate different parts of the brain to elicit emotions such as fear and happiness.
- Quentin is another Glow under Dr. Hatch who has the ability to produce a small EMP, or electromagnetic pulse. He is loyal to Dr. Hatch and is shown to be reckless and impulsive.
- Bryan is a Glow under Dr. Hatch who has the ability to generate highly focused electricity that allows him to cut through solid objects, such as metal, by burning through them. He is loyal to Dr. Hatch, and is very reckless like Quentin.
- Kylee is another Glow under Dr. hatch who can act like a human magnet. She is loyal to Dr. Hatch and the Elgen.

== Reception ==
The book debuted as USA Today's #10 best-selling book in September 2013.
