= Arcade Catastrophe =

2012 children's novel by Brandon Mull

- Author: Brandon Mull
- Illustrator: Brandon Dorman
- Language: English
- Genre: Children's literature, fantasy
- Publisher: Shadow Mountain Publishing
- Publication date: January 1, 2012
- Publication place: United States
- Media type: Print (hardcover and paperback), e-book, audiobook
- Pages: 416
- ISBN: 978-1-60907-179-0
- OCLC: 827715267
- Preceded by: The Candy Shop War

Arcade Catastrophe is a children's fantasy novel written by American author Brandon Mull. It was published by Shadow Mountain Publishing on January 1, 2012. It is the sequel to the 2007 novel The Candy Shop War.

== Plot summary ==
Magical enforcers Ziggy and Victor Battiato, inform Nate, Summer, Trevor, and Pigeon of the disappearances of fellow enforcer John Dart and magician Mozag and direct the group to investigate the Arcadeland arcade. After visiting the arcade, the friends resolve to earn enough tickets to obtain the magical hand stamps, which grant membership into four exclusive clubs. Nate receives his stamp from the owner of Arcadeland, magician Jonas White, who reveals that he is using the clubs to hunt for a powerful artifact named Uweya. Lindy Stott, who is unaware that she is actually Jonas' sister, Belinda White, also earns a stamp, to the dismay of her adoptive guardian Sebastian Stott. Summer gets a Tank stamp, which grants increased endurance, Pigeon joins the Subs, allowing him to breathe underwater, Trevor becomes a Racer, allowing him to move at inhuman speed, and Nate and Lindy join the Jets, who can fly. To ensure their obedience, Jonas creates a simulacrum, a voodoo doll-like facsimile, of each club member.

Jonas’ first task pits the Jets against the Subs in a race to retrieve the Gate to Uweya from a recluse known as the Hermit. Nate and Lindy force the Hermit to hand over the Gate, which takes the form of a stone block, explaining that they were helping Jonas only to save their friends. Pigeon and the other defeated Subs are secretly imprisoned by Jonas under Arcadeland, whereafter he discovers that Dart and Mozag are also held prisoner.

Jonas’ second task pits the Racers against the Tanks to retrieve a guidestone from the Graywater family. The Tanks overpower the Graywaters and seize the guidestone. Instead of returning to Arcadeland with the other Racers, Trevor takes refuge in Mr. Stott's apartment, where he is safe from Jonas’ magic.

The Jets triumph over the Tanks in the third task to use the guidestone to retrieve a small idol called the Protector. Leaving Lindy to return to Arcadeland, Nate heads to Stott's apartment to plan his next move. Summer also flees there to avoid imprisonment with the other Tanks.

Meanwhile, Trevor and Victor are captured in a failed rescue mission to Arcadeland, though Victor manages to transmit the location of the source of Jonas’ magical power to Ziggy, who informs Nate.

Nate then visits the Hermit a second time and is given his charm, which will protect him against Jonas’ magic. Upon his return home, he is confronted by Lindy, who tells him that Jonas revealed the truth about her identity to her.

The next morning, Jonas’ henchmen drive the Jets up to Mt. Diablo, where they descend into an underground chamber. They use the Gate and Protector to bypass the first layers of defenses guarding Uweya. Jonas paralyzes the Jets using his simulacra, though Nate is granted immunity by the Hermit's charm. Nate navigates the final set of defenses and encounters two members of the Graywater family, who tell him that Uweya is a globe that can affect physical objects on the real Earth. Nate uses Uweya to destroy Jonas' power source, then destroys Uweya itself to prevent it from being misused.

With Jonas attenuated, his prisoners are freed and he and his henchmen are taken into custody. Stott requests Nate to support Lindy as she processes her identity and reveals that there is a third White sibling, Camilla, whom Mozag is keeping an eye on.

== Main characters ==
- Nathan "Nate" Sutter: The book's sixth-grade protagonist. He joins the Jets.
- Trevor: Nate's friend who joins the Racers.
- Summer Atler: Nate's friend who joins the Tanks.
- Paul "Pigeon" Bowen: Nate's friend who joins the Subs.
- Lindy Stott: Formerly known as the magician Belinda White before losing her identity and becoming a ten-year-old girl in the previous book, Lindy is adopted by Sebastian Stott, but chafes at his perceived overprotectiveness. One of her eyes is a magically enhanced glass ball, allowing her to see things not normally visible. She joins the Jets with Nate.
- Sebastian Stott: A magician who produces magical treats. He attempts to hide the truth about Lindy's past from her.
- Jonas White: A powerful mage who recruits children at his arcade, Arcadeland, to help him find an ancient artifact. He is the brother of Belinda White. His power of simulcry allows him to manipulate models to effect physical changes on the people they represent.
- Mozag: The world's most powerful magician, whose disappearance drives the events of this book.
- John Dart: A former mob enforcer who now works to police magicians. He disappeared along with Mozag.
- Ziggy and Victor Battiato: Magical enforcers like Dart. They share a special bond, allowing them to transmit strength and information between each other.
