= B. B. Alston =

American children's fantasy author

- Occupation: Writer
- Writing career
- Language: English
- Period: 2021–present
- Genre: Middle grade fantasy
- Notable work: Supernatural Investigations series

B. B. Alston is an American author of children's fantasy novels, best known for the Supernatural Investigations middle grade series that began with Amari and the Night Brothers (2021). His debut novel received starred reviews from Kirkus Reviews, Publishers Weekly and School Library Journal, spent more than 30 weeks on The New York Times children's middle grade hardcover best-seller list, and won the inaugural Barnes & Noble Children's & YA Book Award. Its sequel, Amari and the Great Game (2022), debuted at number one on the same list. A film adaptation is in development at Universal Pictures, with Marsai Martin attached to star and produce.

== Early life and education ==
Alston is from South Carolina. He began writing in middle school, sharing horror stories with his classmates. He completed a premedical degree and was accepted to a medical school in Pennsylvania, but deferred enrollment to pursue writing; in late 2018, while working seasonal jobs, he was preparing to enter a biomedical science program.

== Career ==
In October 2018, Alston pitched his unpublished manuscript Amari and the Night Brothers during #DVpit, a Twitter pitching event for marginalized creators, and subsequently signed with literary agent Gemma Cooper of the Bent Agency. After six publishing houses bid on the manuscript, Balzer + Bray, an imprint of HarperCollins, acquired North American rights to three books in a seven-figure deal. At the 2019 Bologna Children's Book Fair, United Kingdom rights were sold to Egmont following a seven-publisher auction; The Bookseller called the novel "undoubtedly the book of this year's Bologna Children's Book Fair". In May 2019, some twenty months before publication, Universal Pictures acquired the film rights.

Amari and the Night Brothers was published by Balzer + Bray on January 19, 2021. It entered The New York Times children's middle grade hardcover best-seller list at number eight in February 2021, later reached number three, and remained on the list for at least 31 weeks. The novel received starred reviews from Kirkus Reviews, Publishers Weekly and School Library Journal. Kirkus Reviews called it "an impressive debut series opener", writing that "the author weaves magical whimsy with honest, realistically portrayed circumstances", and Publishers Weekly described it as "a sure-to-please winner". Reviewers noted parallels with the Harry Potter series: The Horn Book Magazine wrote that "while many parallels can be drawn between the protagonist and a certain boy wizard, readers will root for Amari's own unique determination and wit", and the British reading charity BookTrust described the book as having "all the comforting appeal of an updated, girl-centred Harry Potter".

In 2021, Amari and the Night Brothers won the inaugural Barnes & Noble Children's & YA Book Award, first in the Young Reader category and then as the overall winner. It was shortlisted for the 2022 Waterstones Children's Book Prize in the Younger Readers category, was a finalist for the 2022 Ignyte Award for middle grade, and was named to the Association for Library Service to Children's 2022 list of Notable Children's Books and the top ten of YALSA's 2022 Quick Picks for Reluctant Young Adult Readers. It later won the Indian Paintbrush Book Award, voted on by Wyoming schoolchildren, for 2024–25. Also in 2021, Alston contributed a short story to the anthology Black Boy Joy, edited by Kwame Mbalia. A sequel, Amari and the Great Game, was published on August 30, 2022. It received a starred review from Kirkus Reviews, which called it "a superb, marvelously satisfying sequel", and debuted at number one on The New York Times children's middle grade hardcover best-seller list. School Library Journal wrote that fans of the first book "will jump at the opportunity to immerse themselves once again in the delights and surprises of this magical world", and Common Sense Media called it "a fun, exciting read".

The third book, Amari and the Despicable Wonders, followed on August 27, 2024, and debuted at number five on Publishers Weekly's children's frontlist fiction best-seller list; the magazine reported that the three books had sold a combined 275,000 print copies. Kirkus Reviews called it "a rousing tale", while Common Sense Media described it as "a fun continuation to the popular series, though it's a bit less fresh than the earlier books". The novel was a finalist for the 2025 Ignyte Award.

A fourth installment, Amari and the Metalwork Menace, was published in February 2026 under Storytide, a HarperCollins imprint launched the previous year with Alston's editor Kristin Rens as an executive editor. It received a starred review from School Library Journal, which wrote that the series "continues to be a strong, exciting fantasy that features true Black girl magic and adventure", and Common Sense Media called it "a clever, fast-paced addition to the Supernatural Investigations series".

== Film adaptation ==
In May 2019, Universal Pictures acquired film rights to Amari and the Night Brothers following a bidding war, with Marsai Martin attached to star and to produce through Genius Productions alongside Josh Martin, Don Cheadle, and Mandeville Films' Todd Lieberman and David Hoberman. Azia Squire was hired to write the screenplay in January 2020. As of 2026, the film remained in development.

== Bibliography ==
=== Supernatural Investigations series ===
- Amari and the Night Brothers (Balzer + Bray, 2021) ISBN 978-0-06-297516-4
- Amari and the Great Game (Balzer + Bray, 2022) ISBN 978-0-06-297519-5
- Amari and the Despicable Wonders (Balzer + Bray, 2024) ISBN 978-0-06-297522-5
- Amari and the Metalwork Menace (Storytide, 2026) ISBN 978-0-06-334002-2

=== Short fiction ===
- Story in Black Boy Joy: 17 Stories Celebrating Black Boyhood, edited by Kwame Mbalia (Delacorte Press, 2021)

== Awards and honors ==
Year	Award or honor	Work	Result	Ref.
2021	Barnes & Noble Children's & YA Book Award – Young Reader category and overall	Amari and the Night Brothers	Won	
2021	School Library Journal Best Middle Grade Books	Amari and the Night Brothers	Selected	
2021	Cybils Award – Elementary/Middle Grade Speculative Fiction	Amari and the Night Brothers	Finalist	
2022	Waterstones Children's Book Prize – Younger Readers	Amari and the Night Brothers	Shortlisted	
2022	Ignyte Award – Best in Middle Grade	Amari and the Night Brothers	Finalist	
2022	ALSC Notable Children's Books	Amari and the Night Brothers	Selected	
2022	YALSA Quick Picks for Reluctant Young Adult Readers – Top Ten	Amari and the Night Brothers	Selected	
2022–23	Texas Bluebonnet Award Master List	Amari and the Night Brothers	Nominee	
2024–25	Indian Paintbrush Book Award	Amari and the Night Brothers	Won	
2025	Ignyte Award – Outstanding Middle Grade	Amari and the Despicable Wonders	Finalist	
