= The Undefeated (picture book) =

2019 picture book by Kwame Alexander

- Author: Kwame Alexander
- Illustrator: Kadir Nelson
- Language: English
- Publisher: Versify/Houghton Mifflin Harcourt
- Publication date: April 2, 2019
- Publication place: United States
- Pages: 40
- Awards: Caldecott Medal, Coretta Scott King Award, Newbery Honor
- ISBN: 978-1-328-78096-6

The Undefeated is a 2019 poem by Kwame Alexander and illustrated by Kadir Nelson. The poem's purpose is to inspire and encourage black communities, while also delivering a tribute to black Americans of all occupations in past years. The poem describes the toughness black Americans faced during times such as slavery, and segregation in America. Nelson's illustrations also provide a visual for the meaning of the poem. The book was well received and won the 2020 Caldecott Medal and a Newbery Honor. Kadir Nelson's artwork also earned it a Coretta Scott King Award.

== Book Banning Controversy ==
In the United States, the book was temporarily removed from Wauneta-Pallisade Public Schools, Nebraska, while the school board investigates the list of books proposed for permanent banning by The Protect Nebraska Children Coalition.

Awards
Preceded by Hello Lighthouse	Caldecott Medal recipient 2020	Succeeded by We Are Water Protectors
