= Words on Fire =

2019 book

- Editor: Lisa Sandell
- Author: Jennifer A. Nielsen
- Language: English
- Genre: Historical fiction
- Set in: 1890s Eastern Europe
- Publisher: Scholastic Publishing
- Publication date: 2019
- Publication place: United States of America
- Pages: 336
- ISBN: 978-1-338-27578-0

Words on Fire is a historical-fiction children's book by American author Jennifer A. Nielsen published in 2019.

== Plot summary ==
The book follows the story of a Lithuanian girl named Audra during the Russian occupation. She is forced to flee her home in June 1893 after it is burned by the Imperial Russian Army. From 1893–1894, she attempts to smuggle books written in the Lithuanian language from East Prussia whilst evading the Russian Army in their efforts to suppress and assimilate the Lithuanians. The book is based on actual book smugglers, who attempted to preserve the Lithuanian language by evading the Russian police and smuggling books from East Prussia.

== Reception ==
Historical Novel Society reviewer Melissa Warren said the book "transcends time and traditional gender roles" and strongly advised it to people aiming to grasp "how we become who we are and what we take from others to become it". Calling the book "compelling and thoughtful", Donna Scanlon of Booklist praised its "complex and well-rounded characters" and found "the plot is gripping and moves swiftly". School Library Connection critic Kristin Fletcher-Spear praised the novel, stating, "There is much on offer in this novel: family love, patriotism, magic, and the importance of books."

In a mixed review, Andrea Beach of Common Sense Media wrote, "The plot is steady, but neither it nor main character Audra have much spark or punch to them". Kirkus Reviews also penned a mixed review finding that "the novel suffers a bit from inconsistent pacing but delivers believable action and suspense"

== Audiobook adaptation ==
The audiobook version of Words on Fire was released by Scholastic and performed by Kathleen McInerney. In a positive review, Booklist's Ashley Young said McInerney "breathe[s] life into the characters and perfectly matches her pace to the action". AudioFile said she "makes listeners feel Audra's terror".
