= After Ever After =

Book by Jordan Sonnenblick

- First edition cover
- Author: Jordan Sonnenblick
- Translator: After Ever After
- Cover artist: Marc Tauss and Marijka Kostiw
- Language: English
- Genre: Young adult fiction
- Publisher: Scholastic Publishings
- Publication date: February 1, 2010
- Publication place: United States
- Media type: Print (Hardback & Paperback)
- Pages: 260 pages
- ISBN: 978-0-439-83706-4
- OCLC: 317383417
- Preceded by: Drums, Girls, and Dangerous Pie

After Ever After is a book written by Jordan Sonnenblick. It is a continuation of the Alper family storyline from Drums, Girls, and Dangerous Pie, focusing on Jeffrey Alper's life after his cancer went into remission. Sonnenblick chose to continue the storyline after receiving an email from a social worker who told him "that the story was far from finished".

== Plot summary ==
Jeff is an 8th grade boy in remission. Even though cancer should be far behind him, Jeff still worries that it will return. He has got normal teen stuff to deal with, too - friends, parents, girls, school. Normally, he would ask his older brother, Steven, for advice. But Steven, always the trusty, responsible one, is finally rebelling and has taken off to Africa to join a drumming circle and "find himself." Jeff feels abandoned. Meanwhile, his best friend, Tad, is hatching some kind of secretive, crazy plan involving eighth-grade graduation. He gets a letter in the mail that says he must pass the test or else he'll get held back. And Lindsey Abraham, away from a hot girl who is new to the school, thinks Jeff is cute . . . which totally freaks him out and they become close friends. There is a lot about life that cancer has prepared Jeff, but there is a lot that is brand-new. Now it is time for him to learn not only how to fight for himself but to stick up for the people he loves. However, in the end, he has to prepare to let go of some of his memories and accept the meaning of death.

Jeff has brain damage and cannot remember intricate things such as math rules, and the state just passed a law that every eighth-grader has to take a standardized end-of-grade test and pass in order to be able to graduate. His friend Thaddeus (Tad) needs a wheelchair to move, so Jeff and Tad make a deal, which was letting Tad tutor Jeff, while Tad exercises to be able to walk across the stage at graduation.

The year passes, and Tad has cancer again. Tad will be unable to be at the school during graduation because he will be in the hospital. Jeff reacts by hosting a bike-a-thon to make Tad feel cared about. The bike-a-thon starts out smoothly, but when it ended, Jeff's mother tells him that right after he started riding, Tad went into sudden liver failure, and died soon after.

The story ends with Jeff passing the tests, at graduation, and accepting both his and Tad's diplomas. In the epilogue, he is at Tad's headstone, having a "conversation" with him. His girlfriend Lindsey walks up to him, and they walk away together, holding hands.

== Characters ==
Jeff Alper: The main protagonist in the story. When he was four, he had Acute Lymphoblastic Leukemia. Now he is in the eighth grade, and still has long-term effects from cancer such as having a limp in one of his legs, shaky hands, and not being able to concentrate from the medication. His best friend is Tad, a fellow cancer survivor in remission. Jeff meets Lindsey at the beginning of the book, and Jeffrey falls head over heels for her, and she displays interest in him as well.

Thaddeus Ibsen: Known as Tad, he is Jeffrey's best friend who also had cancer, towards the end of the novel, it returns and he dies. He has to walk on the treadmill every day and usually has to ride his wheelchair. Tad acts as Jeffrey's mentor (he cares for Jeffrey too), tutoring him in math for the countrywide standardized test which Jeff knows he is going to fail. He is sarcastic and cynical because of his hard life as a cancer patient. Tad also says that he will walk to the stage to receive his diploma if Jeffrey studies, but he never does since he dies.

Lindsey Abraham: The hot new girl from California who thinks very highly of Jeffrey. She assists Jeff in many things. Lindsey eventually becomes Jeff's girlfriend about halfway through the book. Lindsey likes to study and through Jeffrey's eyes, she is unlike other girls.

Steven Alper: Jeffrey's older brother. Always the one you could count on, he decides to drop out of his junior year at NYU and set off to Africa with nothing but a pair of bongo drums strapped to his back to go "find himself." He returns to see his brother graduate at the end of the novel.

Annette Watson Steven's girlfriend since 8th grade. She has been attending Juilliard for college and decided that Steven should stay in the same city for college so they could be together. She is with Steven at Jeffery's graduation.

Mr. and Mrs. Alper: Steven and Jeffrey's parents. Mr. Alper is always hard on Jeff, mainly in math. Jeffrey explains how when his father found out about the standardized testing, he would have Jeffrey doing math problems so much that whenever he sneezed, "fractions would fly out of [his] nose." Mrs. Alper has always been kind and caring about Jeffrey. He always cared about him, though.

Mr. and Mrs. Abraham: Lindsey's mom and dad. Lindsey's dad works with movies. Lindsey sometimes helps him.

Mr. McGrath: Jeffery's gym teacher, present through most of the book.

== Reception ==
Critical reception to After Ever After has been positive, with Publishers Weekly praising the book's "emotional highs and lows". Kirkus Reviews and Booklist both positively reviewed the book, with Kirkus writing that "this stand-alone tween narrative slots neatly into the space between the author’s YA and J titles, sensitively dealing with issues of family, friendship and death in a way that will appeal to middle-grade students". Teen Reads commented on the book's continuation of the story from Drums, Girls, and Dangerous Pie, stating that the book "provides that extra insight into the ongoing battle that is known as life". The School Library Journal commented on the book, saying "Sonnenblick’s intimate first-person tale of survival is a solid stand-alone novel that will leave an emotional, uplifting imprint on readers."
