= Red Kayak =

2004 young adult novel by Priscilla Cummings

- First edition cover
- Author: Priscilla Cummings
- Cover artist: Irene Vandervoort
- Genre: Young adult novel
- Publisher: Dutton Juvenile
- Publication date: 2004
- Pages: 209
- ISBN: 0-525-47317-3
- Followed by: The Journey Back

Red Kayak is a young adult novel by American author Priscilla Cummings. It was first published in 2004 and tells the story of a teenager who feels partially responsible for the death of a three-year-old, and the moral dilemma of whether to tell others about the truth he uncovers about the baby's death. Red Kayak is the first in a series of three books, the sequel being The Journey Back.

== Synopsis ==
Red Kayak is written from the point of view of a thirteen-year-old boy named Brady Parks who is part of a poor crab-fishing family on the Chesapeake Bay in Maryland. A wealthy family called the DiAngelos buys the property Brady and his friends are used to enjoying near the water. One day, Brady sees a red kayak owned by the DiAngelos heading into the river in dangerous weather. Brady and his friends decide not to warn the people in the kayak, thinking it's Mr. DiAngelo. Later, they find out it was Mrs. DiAngelo and her three-year-old son, who Brady previously babysat for, that were going out on the kayak, which overturns and leads to the death of the boy.

In the final section of the book, Brady does what he believes is the right thing, and tells his father everything. They recover the kayak which was still sunken in the water, and which clearly shows the holes drilled in the hull. Brady testifies to the authorities who agree to grant him immunity in exchange for his testimony. In the end, JT and Digger are convicted of second degree murder, but Brady is relieved that they are only sentenced to nine months of forest restoration in a juvenile work camp. The DiAngelos reconcile and sell their property to start anew elsewhere as they prepare for the birth of a daughter. Life goes on for Brady and his used-to-be friends. Mr. DiAngelo and Mrs. DiAngelo however don't come back together again.

== Reception ==
The book received generally positive reviews, and was called a "well-written, sometimes gripping story" and a "strong effort" by Kirkus Reviews. The Booklist praised Cummings' skillful writing of the plot and characters, calling Brady's decision to tell the truth about his friends' actions "both anguished and well reasoned, making for a realistic conclusion." The critic also praises the author's usage of Maryland's eastern heritage in the building of the characters.

Writing for the Bulletin of the Center for Children's Books, Stevenson comments on "the subtle layers" that are present in the story, such as the fear the poorer families feel, of being ousted from their lands by the newly rich ones. The reviewer also praises how believable the dilemmas Brady goes through are.

Red Kayak was present in the New York Public Library's list of "notable books for teens" of 2005, and in the American Library Association's list of "Best Book for Young Adults" of 2006.
