= Michael Vey: Storm of Lightning =

2015 book by Richard Paul Evans

- First edition cover
- Author: Richard Paul Evans
- Series: Michael Vey
- Publisher: Simon Pulse
- Publication date: September 2015
- Preceded by: Hunt for Jade Dragon (2014)
- Followed by: Fall of Hades (2016)

Michael Vey: Storm of Lightning is the fifth book in American author Richard Paul Evans's Michael Vey heptalogy. It was released in September 2015.

== Plot ==
The Elgen attack Timepiece Ranch, but it appears deserted. Hatch's chief of security, Welch, informs Hatch that Jade Dragon escaped, and Hatch has Welch arrested, intending to feed him to the electric rats once they reach Tuvalu.

The Electroclan return to America after rescuing Jade Dragon. They immediately head to Timepiece Ranch to search for survivors. Michael fights local gang members along the way, but gives himself Lichtenberg figures on his skin in the process. Once the Electroclan arrives, they find no survivors aside from one Elgen guard, but no remains. Confused, they return to America, seeking treatment for the wounded guard.

At the hotel, the Electroclan are visited by the resistance's head strategist, Gervaso. He informs them that Timepiece Ranch was evacuated before the attack. He takes the Electroclan to a new safehouse, Christmas Ranch, to plan their next attack on the Elgen before they take over Tuvalu.

Hatch's electric children learn of Welch's arrest and impending execution. Seeing Welch as a father figure, Quentin, Torstyn and Tara use their powers to break Welch out, and he goes on the run. Hatch suspects his electric children, but has no immediate evidence. Instead, he reveals his wish for Quentin to lead the nation of Tuvalu once the Elgen take over. Quentin warily accepts, worried that Hatch knows about his betrayal and is just playing him.

While at Christmas Ranch, the resistance learns that Taylor's father has been questioned for his wife and daughter's involvement with the Electroclan, and that Taylor's mother was arrested in Meridan. Michael, Taylor, and Ian head to Idaho to rescue them, and discover that many in the Meridan police force are bought out by the Elgen. The resistance sets a thermite bomb in the prison's parking lot, allowing Michael to rescue Taylor's parents. Taylor's father is taken back to Christmas Ranch.

Despite the Electroclan's warning, The Tuvalu government remains oblivious to the Elgen threat. While Hatch wines and dines with dignitaries of Tuvalu, Quentin leads the capture of the nation using Elgen forces. Hatch forces the trapped Tuvalu government to pledge an oath to him. The former Prime Minister is placed in a cage of monkeys as punishment for disobedience.

Later, Hatch learns of Quentin, Torstyn, and Tara's betrayal. He has them arrested, and Quentin is placed in another cage of monkeys.

The book ends with Michael and the Electroclan, with the help of the resistance, planning their most daring mission yet to stop Hatch.

== Characters ==
- Michael Vey is the protagonist of the series. He is a teenager with Tourette's syndrome who is constantly bullied by his peers. Michael is a Glow, one of a few people who have electrical-based powers. His abilities allow him to "pulse" with electric energy, shocking people like an electric eel.
- Taylor Ridley is Michael's girlfriend and a cheerleader at Meridian High, whom Michael has a crush on. She is also a Glow who was undiscovered by Dr. Hatch. Her abilities allow her to scramble the electrical signals in brains, causing confusion. She can also read minds.
- Ostin Liss is Michael's best friend and is considered a genius.
- Dr. Hatch is a scientist who founded the Elgen Academy. He is the antagonist, who manipulates the Glows and exploits their powers for his personal glory and ambition.
- Jack Vranes is one of the bullies at Meridian High who, along with his friends Wade West and Mitchell Manchester, often targets Michael. Jack drives Michael to Pasadena to rescue Mrs. Vey and Taylor from Elgen Academy.
- Zeus has the ability to 'throw' lightning, getting his nickname from the ancient Greek god Zeus. Elgen abducted him as a little kid, killed his family, and told him that he did it.
- Wade West is one of the bullies at Meridian High. Wade is a normal human who helped the Electroclan.
- Nichelle is a Glow who is loyal to Dr. Hatch. Her ability allows her to suck away the power and energy from other Glows. The process is comparable to mosquitoes sucking blood from a host. Because of her nasty attitude and unique ability that only affects them, the other Glows at the Elgen Academy dislike her. She enjoys torturing others with her dark power.
- Ian is a Glow who is first introduced in Purgatory with McKenna and Abigail. He is blind, but his ability allows him to see through electrolocation, much like a bat.
- McKenna is a Glow who is first introduced in Purgatory with Ian and Abigail. She has the ability to create light and heat from her body.
- Abigail, is a Glow who is first introduced in Purgatory with Ian and McKenna. Her ability allows her to suppress pain by stimulating nerve endings through physical contact or conduction through metal.
- Schema is a businessman and former chairman of the Elgen board of directors. He helped produce the original MEI and invested in its production.
- Grace acts as a “human flash drive,” and is able to transfer and store large amounts of electronic data. She was left behind after Dr. Hatch fled and joined the Electroclan.
- Tanner is one of the Glows under Dr. Hatch's control. He has the ability to interfere with an aircraft's navigation and electrical systems, shutting them down and making them crash. He has murdered thousands of people under Dr. Hatch's orders.
- Tara is Taylor's identical twin sister. Like with her sister Taylor, Tara's abilities deal with manipulation of the mind. She can stimulate different parts of the brain to elicit emotions such as fear and happiness.
- Quentin is another Glow under Dr. Hatch who has the ability to produce a small EMP, or electromagnetic pulse. He is loyal to Dr. Hatch and is shown to be reckless and impulsive.
- Bryan is a Glow under Dr. Hatch who has the ability to generate highly focused electricity that allows him to cut through solid objects, such as metal, by burning through them. He is loyal to Dr. Hatch, and is very reckless like Quentin.
- Kylee is another Glow under Dr. hatch who can act like a human magnet. She is loyal to Dr. Hatch and the Elgen.

== Sequel ==
The sequel to this book, Michael Vey: Fall of Hades, was published on September 13, 2016.
