= Eric Litwin =

American storyteller and musician (born 1966)

- Litwin at a National Book Festival reading, August 2014
- Born: August 16, 1966 (age 60); New York City, U.S.
- Education: George Washington University; University at Albany
- Writing career
- Genre: Children's fiction
- Website: ericlitwin.com

Eric Litwin (born August 16, 1966), also known as Mr. Eric, is an American storyteller and musician. He is best known as the original author of the Pete the Cat books.

== Life ==
Litwin was born in New York City. He graduated from George Washington University, and the University at Albany. He moved to Atlanta, Georgia, in 1993.

Litwin is a former classroom teacher in special education. He has two Masters degrees, one in Education and one in Administration.

== Works ==
- Pete the Cat: Rocking in My School Shoes. HarperCollins. 26 July 2011. ISBN 978-0-06-191024-1.
- Pete the Cat. Illustrator James Dean. HarperCollins. 2008. ISBN 978-0-06-206560-5.
- Pete the Cat Saves Christmas. Illustrator James Dean. HarperCollins. 23 December 2013. ISBN 978-0-06-211065-7.
- Pete the Cat and His Four Groovy Buttons, HarperCollins Publishers Limited, 2014, ISBN 9780007553679
- The Nuts: Bedtime at the Nut House. Little, Brown Books for Young Readers. 29 July 2014. ISBN 978-0-316-25775-6.
- Groovy Joe: Ice Cream and Dinosaurs. Illustrated by Tom Lichtenheld. Orchard Books, 2016
