= The Dollhouse Murders =

Book by Betty Ren Wright

- First edition cover (pub. Scholastic)
- Author: Betty Ren Wright
- Language: English
- Publication date: January 1, 1983
- Award: Rebecca Caudill Young Readers' Book Award (1989)

The Dollhouse Murders is a 1983 book written by author Betty Ren Wright. It is a story of teenager, Amy, and her sister, Louann, who had an intellectual disability.

In 1989, it received the Rebecca Caudill Young Readers' Book Award. It was adapted into a film for television in 1992.

== Plot ==
In the attic of her aunt's house, Amy finds a beautiful dollhouse that is an exact replica of the house itself. Playing with the dollhouse causes the dolls to reenact the grisly murder of Amy's great-grandparents, who died in the house thirty years before. Amy, her mentally disabled sister Louann, and Amy's best friend Ellen, convinced that the dollhouse is trying to tell them something, find themselves struggling to solve the murder and lay the spirits of the dollhouse to rest. Amy has a good relationship with her aunt Clare who helps her and encourages her to believe in herself.

Awards
Preceded by A Bundle of Sticks	Mark Twain Award; 1986	Succeeded by The War with Grandpa
