= Curveball: The Year I Lost My Grip =

2012 novel by Jordan Sonnenblick

- First edition cover
- Author: Jordan Sonnenblick
- Cover artist: Michael Frost; David Madison; Elizabeth B. Parisi
- Language: English
- Genre: Young adult fiction
- Publisher: Scholastic Publishings
- Publication date: March 2012
- Publication place: United States
- Media type: Print (Hardback & Paperback)
- Pages: 285 pages
- ISBN: 978-0-545-32069-6
- OCLC: 708647274

Curveball: The Year I Lost My Grip is a book written by Jordan Sonnenblick. It is the story of Peter Friedman and the year he injures his elbow, making him never able to pitch on his baseball team again. It is also the same year that his grandfather develops Alzheimer's disease. His best friend AJ, still a star baseball player himself, keeps reminding Peter of his loss. The one bright spot is his new cute girlfriend Angelika and the gift of his grandfather's photography equipment.

== Main characters ==
Peter Friedman, the main character. Played as a pitcher on a baseball team with his best friend AJ. But due to him hurting his elbow and needing surgery he can't play baseball ever again.

Adam James, also known as AJ, who is Peter's best friend. Catcher and pitcher for the baseball team.

Angelika, Peter's friend he made in basic photography who he talks to about his grandpa.

Peter's Grandpa , An old photographer who may be beginning to age. Quits photography at a point and gives Peter thousands of dollars' worth of photography equipment. Peter's favorite of his relatives.

== Summary ==
High-schooler Peter Friedman was an amazing pitcher and catcher in the sport he loved, baseball. This all changed when the cartilage in his elbow snapped and rendered him unfit for baseball. His grandfather, a photographer, is slowly losing his memory and decides to give Peter all of his equipment. Soon, Peter meets a girl, Angelika, in his photography class, and they become friends. He becomes the schools newspaper photographer with Angelika and soon later start to gain feelings for each other. A story told with friendship, struggle, and love is an all-around success.

== Reception ==
School Library Journal said that, "The dialogue sparkles, and Peter's conversations with the randy, politically incorrect AJ are often laugh-out-loud funny. Another winner that can be confidently recommended to readers, athletes or not."
