= Pete the Cat =

Children's picture book series created by illustrator James Dean

- Front cover
- Authors: Eric Litwin (2008–2012); Kimberly Dean (2013–present); James Dean (2013–present)
- Illustrator: James Dean
- Cover artist: James Dean
- Language: English
- Series: Pete the Cat
- Genre: Picture book, song
- Publisher: HarperCollins (2010)
- Publication date: 2008 (self)
- Publication place: United States
- ISBN: 978-0-06-190622-0
- OCLC: 529761572
- Followed by: Pete the Cat: Rocking in My School Shoes

Pete the Cat is a book series created by American artist James Dean, centered on the titular anthropomorphic cat. The series started with four books illustrated by Dean and with text by Eric Litwin; since then, James Dean and his wife Kimberly Dean have written and illustrated a series of the books.

== Content ==
The first book, Pete the Cat: I Love My White Shoes, is the story of an anthropomorphic blue cat named Pete whose white shoes become dirty after he steps in various substances, but "Pete never loses his cool". Written as a song, its refrain is "I love my white shoes", changing to "I love my red shoes", "I love my blue shoes", and "I love my brown shoes". He then steps in a bucket of water and the colors wash off, and they become wet, but still never loses his cool, he just sings his song.

The book was self-published in 2008 and sold 7,000 copies in 10 months before it was picked up by HarperCollins, which had been alerted by a YouTube meme in which two young girls read the book. It was then distributed throughout the United States and Canada and rose to number 8 on the New York Times Best Seller list for picture books.

There have been 87 Pete the Cat books published.

== Author and illustrator ==
Eric Litwin (also known as "Mr. Eric") is an American storyteller and musician from Atlanta.

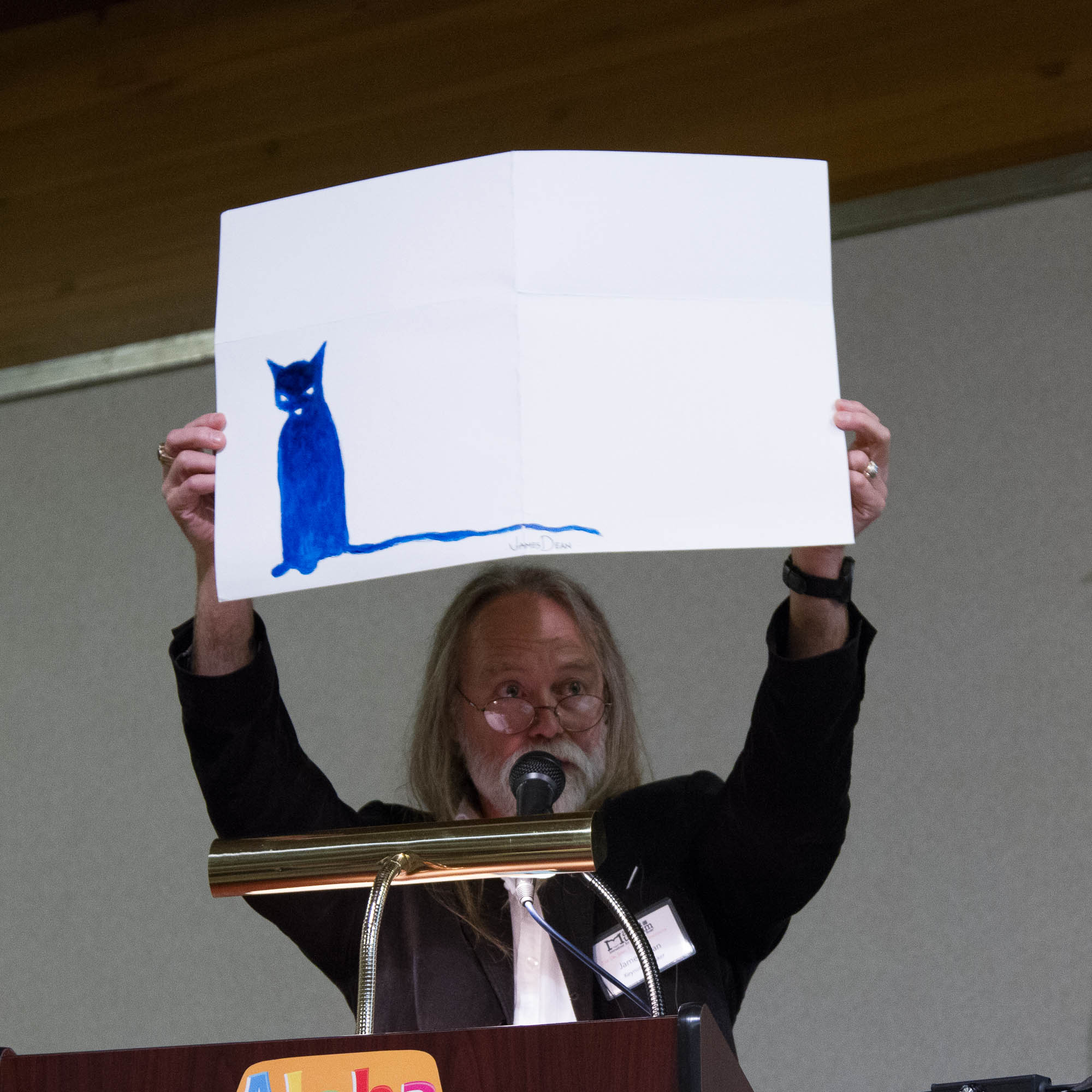
Dean holding up his original drawing of Pete the Cat at the 2013 Mazza Museum Summer Conference

The book uses a character first devised by James Dean, an artist active in Atlanta, who drew up Pete in 1999 and in 2006 self-published The Misadventures of Pete the Cat. Litwin wrote a story about and a song for the cat, and the two began a partnership.

The collaboration between Dean and Litwin ended in 2012 due to creative differences between the two. James Dean and his wife, Kimberly Dean, continue to write and illustrate the Pete the Cat series (now over 60 books) together.

== Honors ==
In 2010, the Georgia Center for the Book released a list titled "25 Books All Young Georgians Should Read". Pete the Cat: I Love My White Shoes is one of the books included in that list.

== Adaptations ==
=== Television ===
On December 26, 2017, an animated holiday special, Pete the Cat: A Groovy New Year, was released on Amazon Prime. Jacob Tremblay starred as the title character, with his parents voiced by Elvis Costello and Diana Krall. Additional voices were provided by Atticus Shaffer, KT Tunstall, and Don Was. It was followed by a Pete the Cat series which was released on September 21, 2018. It was based on the books and developed by Phineas and Ferb co-creator Jeff "Swampy" Marsh. The series also has a Christmas special titled Pete the Cat: A Very Groovy Christmas which was released on November 20, 2018, guest starring Dave Matthews and Jason Mraz. There are tie-in books based on the TV series. A second season began production in February 2019. Throughout June–July 2019, clips from then-unreleased episodes from season 1 were uploaded to the Pete the Cat YouTube channel. The clips were later taken down in July 2019, but were reuploaded one month later. The second half of season 1 was released on August 9, 2019. A Valentine's Day special titled Pete the Cat: A Very Groovy Valentine's Day was released on February 7, 2020. The first part of season 2 premiered on June 26, 2020. For season 2, Marsh and KT Tunstall replaced Elvis Costello and Diana Krall as Pete's parents. Three days later, the series also released a PSA about hand washing. The second part of season 2 was released on November 13, 2020. A back-to-school special, Pete the Cat: Back to School Operetta, was released on August 27, 2021. The third part of season 2 was released on November 5, 2021. The fourth and final part of season 2 was released on March 11, 2022.

=== Musical ===
TheatreWorksUSA has created two Pete the Cat musicals.

== See also ==
- List of fictional cats and other felines
