= The Candy Shop War =

2007 children's novel by Brandon Mull

- Author: Brandon Mull
- Illustrator: Brandon Dorman
- Language: English
- Series: The Candy Shop War series
- Genre: Children's literature, fantasy
- Publisher: Shadow Mountain Publishing
- Publication date: September 11, 2007
- Publication place: United States
- Media type: Print (hardback & paperback), e-book, audiobook
- Pages: 404 pp (first edition, hardback)
- ISBN: 978-1-59038-783-2 (first edition, hardback)
- OCLC: 137244606
- LC Class: PZ7.M9112 Can 2007
- Followed by: Arcade Catastrophe

The Candy Shop War is a children's fantasy novel written by American author Brandon Mull. It was published by Shadow Mountain Publishing on September 11, 2007. The story follows a boy named Nate and his friends, who become the recipients of magical candy from magicians seeking a powerful treasure. The book is partly based on Mull's own childhood experience of moving to and living in a Northern California town.

== Plot summary ==
Fifth grade Nate Sutter and his family move to the fictional town of Colson, California, where he became friends with children at school Summer Atler, Trevor, and Paul "Pigeon" Bowen.

The four acquaint themselves with Belinda White, proprietor of a candy shop, who rewards them with candy in exchange for helping clean the store.

Belinda White instructs them to complete more difficult tasks, such as breaking into a museum and stealing a memoir and a pocket watch, rewarding them with candy with magical properties, though the tasks grow more concerning and the four begin to doubt her true intentions after she reveals that she is a magician hunting for an ancient treasure.

Summer and Pigeon back out after White directs the four to taint the food of Sebastian Stott, whom she claims is an evil magician, with a "Clean Slate", which causes amnesia. Nate and Trevor pretend to accept the assignment and warn Stott.

Nate and Trevor infiltrate White's shop, but Trevor is captured.

The three friends meet the mysterious man whom they fought during one of White's tasks; he reveals himself as John Dart, who tells them that the treasure is a draught from the Fountain of Youth, which both Stott and White are seeking to augment their power.

With Stott's help, Nate rescues Trevor but is captured and forced to retrieve the draught for White. However, Nate foils White's plans by putting the "Clean Slate" candy (from the mission to give Mr. Stott amnesia) into the draught before giving it to White, so White is reverted to a child and loses her memory when she drinks it.

== Main characters ==
- Nathan "Nate" Sutter: The book's fifth-grade protagonist. He recently moved to Colson and earns the respect of Summer, Trevor, and Pigeon after confronting a group of bullies.
- Summer Atler: A tough, athletic girl who befriends Nate. She terminates her relationship with White after being asked to erase Stott's identity.
- Paul "Pigeon" Bowen: A shy boy who also befriends Nate. He is an avid reader but less athletic compared to his friends.
- Trevor: One of Nate's new friends. Trevor falls victim to Belinda after the friends turn on her and becomes trapped in a mirror until Nate is able to rescue him.
- Belinda White: A magician who owns the Sweet Tooth Ice Cream and Candy Shoppe. She gives magical candy to children to help her obtain a powerful treasure, with which she plans to enslave the population.
- Sebastian Stott: A magician who owns The Candy Wagon ice cream truck. He produces his own magical treats and tries to stop White from reaching the treasure.
- John Dart: A former mob enforcer who now polices magicians. He is cursed to suffer any injury he directly inflicts on another.

== Sequel ==
A sequel to The Candy Shop War, titled Arcade Catastrophe, was published in 2012.

The third and final book in the series, titled Carnival Quest, was published in 2023.

== Mobile game ==
A now-unavailable multiplayer mobile game titled after the book was released on the iOS App Store in 2013.
