= Jennifer Brown (author) =

American writer (born 1972)

- Born: May 11, 1972 (age 54); Kansas City, Missouri, U.S.
- Occupation: Novelist
- Children: 3
- Writing career
- Pen name: Jennifer Scott
- Period: 2009–present
- Genres: Realistic fiction for teens (YA fiction) and children Women's fiction (as Scott)
- Website: jenniferbrownya.com

Jennifer Ann Brown (born May 11, 1972) is an American writer best known for teen fiction including her debut novel Hate List (2009). At least from 2013 she also writes fiction under the name Jennifer Scott.

== Personal life ==
Born in Kansas City, Missouri, Brown lives there with her husband and three children as of 2014. She was once a humor columnist for The Kansas City Star, in which she won the Erma Bombeck Global Humor Award in 2005 and 2006.

== Publications ==
Teen fiction

- Hate List (Little, Brown, September 1, 2009)
- Bitter End (May 10, 2011)
- Perfect Escape (July 10, 2012)
- Thousand Words (May 2013)
- Torn Away (May 2014)
- Say Something: a Hate List novella (Hachette Audio, 2014), read by Ivan Martinovic, OCLC 869469958
- Shade Me: Nikki Kill Series Book 1 (2016)
- Dare You: Nikki Kill Series Book 2 (February 2017)
- Break Us: Nikki Kill Series Book 3 (February 13, 2018)

Children's fiction

Brown writes fiction for pre-teens, too. The Library of Congress catalog classifies these two stories by subject (LCSH) as astronomy fiction, family fiction, middle-school fiction, etc.; not as science fiction.

- Life on Mars (Bloomsbury, August 2014), LCCN 2013-38537
- How Lunchbox Jones Saved Me from Robots, Traitors, and Missy the Cruel (Bloomsbury, August 2015), LCCN 2014-19118

Women's fiction as Jennifer Scott

Brown writes women's fiction under the name Jennifer Scott.

- The Sister Season (New American Library Accent, 2013), LCCN 2013-19767
- The Accidental Book Club (Accent, 2014), LCCN 2014-337
- The Hundred Gifts (Accent, 2015), LCCN 2015-18141
- Second Chance Friends (Accent, 2015), LCCN 2014-47035
