= Michael Vey: The Prisoner of Cell 25 =

2011 novel by Richard Paul Evans

- Author: Richard Paul Evans
- Language: English
- Series: Michael Vey
- Genre: Sci-Fi
- Published: Simon Pulse, Mercury Ink
- Media type: Paperback and Hardcover
- Pages: 326
- ISBN: 1442475102
- Followed by: Michael Vey: Rise of the Elgen

Michael Vey: The Prisoner of Cell 25 is a 2011 young adult/science fiction novel by Richard Paul Evans, the first title of both the Michael Vey heptalogy and to be published by Glenn Beck's owned Mercury Ink. The novel follows Michael Vey, a teenager with the ability to pulse or surge electricity out of his hands, as he ventures to California to rescue his mother from an organization known as Elgen.

== Synopsis ==
Michael Vey is a teenager with Tourette's syndrome and electrical abilities that allow him to shock through direct contact. He manages to remain inconspicuous and "normal" until his school bullies attack him, causing him to lose control and shock them in front of popular cheerleader Taylor Ridley. Michael worries that Taylor will tell everyone what she saw, but when she seeks him out over the next few days, Michael figures out that she also has electrical abilities. Michael, Taylor, and Ostin, Michael's genius best friend, form a small club called the "Electroclan".

Michael and Taylor discover that they were both born at the Pasadena General hospital in California within a few days of each other, and that many infants born in that same time in the same hospital mysteriously died. They also discover that Michael and Taylor are being tracked by a secret organization called the Elgen, who are also linked to the deaths at the hospital. Michael and Taylor receive scholarships from an "Elgen Academy". When Michael tells his mother about the scholarship on his birthday a few days later, she becomes frightened, and while making their way out of the restaurant they were eating at, a man attempts to rob them. Michael shocks him unconscious, and another man appears, accompanied by two teenagers. The man identifies himself as Dr. James Hatch, and he is aware about Michael's abilities. The teenagers with him also have special electrical abilities. They proceed to shock Michael's mother and make Michael pass out.

Michael wakes up in a hospital and is told that his mother has been kidnapped. Meanwhile, Taylor has been taken captive from her cheerleading practice by the Elgen and taken to the Elgen Academy. She meets several other students at the school, all of whom have electrical abilities. While Taylor initially enjoys her time at the academy, she soon realizes that Dr. Hatch manipulates the electric children to prove their loyalty. When Taylor refuses, she is tortured and sent to Purgatory, a small cell in the basement with three other rebellious electric children, Ian Abigail, and McKenna.

Michael makes a deal with his bullies, who agree to drive him and Ostin to Pasadena to rescue Taylor and his mother. When they arrive, Michael and the others try unsuccessfully to free Taylor, but are ultimately captured by the Elgen. Dr. Hatch offers to let him join the school, but he must prove his loyalty by killing one of his bullies. When he refuses, he is sent to Cell 25 for almost a month to be tortured. Eventually, Michael is released, and Dr. Hatch has one of the other electric children, Zeus, kill Taylor and Ostin in front of him to try to force his hand. However, Michael manages to overpower him, rescuing his friends and recruiting Zeus. They break the other electric children out of Purgatory, and a lengthy battles ensues between the Electroclan and the Elgen.

Michael and the Electroclan take over the control room and release the GPs (human guinea pigs), who then help to clear out the remaining Elgen. The electroclan is nearly defeated by Dr. Hatch's electric children, but Michael manages to overwhelm them. Dr. Hatch escapes from the academy with his electric children, leaving the Electroclan victorious.

== Characters ==
- Michael Vey is the protagonist of the series. He is a teenager with Tourette's syndrome who is constantly bullied by his peers. Michael is a Glow, one of a few people who have electrical-based powers. His abilities allow him to "pulse" with electric energy, shocking people like an electric eel.
- Taylor Ridley is Michael's girlfriend and a cheerleader at Meridian High, whom Michael has a crush on. She is also a Glow who was undiscovered by Dr. Hatch. Her abilities allow her to scramble the electrical signals in brains, causing confusion. She can also read minds.
- Ostin Liss is Michael's best friend and is considered a genius.
- Dr. Hatch is a scientist who founded the Elgen Academy. He is the antagonist, who manipulates the Glows and exploits their powers for his personal glory and ambition.
- Jack Vranes is one of the bullies at Meridian High who, along with his friends Wade West and Mitchell Manchester, often targets Michael. Jack drives Michael to Pasadena to rescue Mrs. Vey and Taylor from Elgen Academy.
- Zeus has the ability to 'throw' lightning, getting his nickname from the ancient Greek god Zeus. Elgen abducted him as a little kid, killed his family, and told him that he did it.
- Wade West is one of the bullies at Meridian High. Wade is a normal human who helped the Electroclan.
- Nichelle is a Glow who is loyal to Dr. Hatch. Her ability allows her to suck away the power and energy from other Glows. The process is comparable to mosquitoes sucking blood from a host. Because of her nasty attitude and unique ability that only affects them, the other Glows at the Elgen Academy dislike her. She enjoys torturing others with her dark power.
- Ian is a Glow who is first introduced in Purgatory with McKenna and Abigail. He is blind, but his ability allows him to see through electrolocation, much like a bat.
- McKenna is a Glow who is first introduced in Purgatory with Ian and Abigail. She has the ability to create light and heat from her body.
- Abigail, is a Glow who is first introduced in Purgatory with Ian and McKenna. Her ability allows her to suppress pain by stimulating nerve endings through physical contact or conduction through metal.
- Grace acts as a “human flash drive,” and is able to transfer and store large amounts of electronic data. She was left behind after Dr. Hatch fled, she then proceeded to join the Electroclan.
- Tanner is one of the Glows under Dr. Hatch's control. He has the ability to interfere with an aircraft's navigation and electrical systems, shutting them down and making them crash. He has murdered thousands of people under Dr. Hatch's orders.
- Tara is Taylor's identical twin sister. Like with her sister Taylor, Tara's abilities deal with manipulation of the mind. She can stimulate different parts of the brain to elicit emotions such as fear and happiness.
- Quentin is another Glow under Dr. Hatch who has the ability to produce a small EMP, or electromagnetic pulse. He is loyal to Dr. Hatch and is shown to be reckless and impulsive.
- Bryan is a Glow under Dr. Hatch who has the ability to generate highly focused electricity that allows him to cut through solid objects, such as metal, by burning through them. He is loyal to Dr. Hatch, and is very reckless like Quentin.
- Kylee is another Glow under Dr. Hatch who can act like a human magnet. She is loyal to Dr. Hatch and the Elgen.

== Sequels ==
- Michael Vey: Rise of the Elgen on August 14, 2012
- Michael Vey: Battle of the Ampere on September 17, 2013
- Michael Vey: Hunt for Jade Dragon on September 16, 2014
- Michael Vey: Storm of Lightning on September 15, 2015
- Michael Vey: Fall of Hades on September 13, 2016
- Michael Vey: The Final Spark on September 12, 2017
- Michael Vey: The Parasite on November 8, 2022
- Michael Vey: The Traitor on September 19, 2023
- Michael Vey: The Colony on August 7, 2024

== Honors ==
- Number one book on the New York Times Chapter Book list for the week ending August 28, 2011.
- Number one selling book in Barnes & Noble, number 2 in Amazon.com for Michael Vey.
- On August 25, it was ranked number 38 on USA Today's best sellers.
- Michael Vey reached Number Seven on the chart for USA Today in August.
- The Salt Lake Tribune announced that Michael Vey made number seven on the Deseret Book for the week of Aug. 22 through Aug. 27 chart.
