= Priscilla Cummings =

American author (born 1951)

- Born: April 13, 1951 (age 75); Ludlow, Massachusetts, United States
- Occupation: Children's writer
- Writing career
- Genres: Young adult fiction, Children's literature
- Notable works: Chadwick the Crab series; Red Kayak the novel

Priscilla Cummings (born April 13, 1951) is an American author. She has published picture books and young adult novels, and is most known for writing Chadwick the Crab, a children's picture book, and Red Kayak, a novel for young adults.

== Career ==
Cummings was born on April 13, 1951, in Ludlow, Massachusetts, and lived most of her childhood in a farm, as the middle child of three. She graduated from the University of New Hampshire, where she acquired a major in English. After graduation, Cummings began working as a journalist. She worked for 10 years to different newspapers from several states, and later, in the 1980s, she moved to Maryland, where she worked as a writer and editor for Baltimore magazine. During her time in Maryland, Cummings met the journalist John Frece, whom she married in 1983.

While still working as a reporter Cummings began writing her first book, called Chadwick the Crab. Her script was rejected over a dozen times before finally being accepted for publishing by Tidewater Publishers in 1986. Cummings had her first child in the same year, and, after having her second child three years later, she decided to stay home and take care of them. To reconcile her desire to keep writing, she began working on more picture books for children. She published several other books in the Chadwick series before publishing her first young adult novel in 1997, Autumn Journey. She decided to focus more on young adult novels after her own children started going to high school.

== Personal life ==
Priscilla Cummings is married to John Frece and has two children.

== Selected works ==
- Cummings, Priscilla (1986). Chadwick the Crab. Centreville, Md.: Tidewater Publishers. ISBN 978-0-87033-347-7.
- Cummings, Priscilla (1997). Autumn Journey (1st ed.). New York: Cobblehill Books. ISBN 978-0-525-65238-0.
- Cummings, Priscilla (2001). A Face First (1st ed.). New York: Dutton Children's Books. ISBN 0-525-46522-7.
- Cummings, Priscilla (2004). Red Kayak (1st ed.). New York: Dutton Children's Books. ISBN 978-0-525-47317-6.
