= Drums, Girls, and Dangerous Pie =

2004 novel by Jordan Sonnenblick

- Author: Jordan Sonnenblick
- Language: English (reading)
- Genre: Young Adult Fiction
- Publication date: 2004
- Pages: 273
- Followed by: After Ever After

Drums, Girls, and Dangerous Pie is a book aimed at children and young teenagers, and was the 2004 debut novel from author Jordan Sonnenblick, originally published by DayBlue Insights and later by Scholastic. Publishers Weekly described it as "insightful".

Sonnenblick, an English teacher and former student of author Frank McCourt, was inspired to write the novel by the real-life story of one of his own students.

== Plot ==
My temporary good cheer lasted until I got on the bus. Renee Albert caught my eye (well, OK, she always catches my eye) and spoke. How's the brain injury? Which brought me back to reality really, really fast.

— Excerpt from Drums, Girls, and Dangerous Pie

The protagonist of the book is Steven Alper, a 13-year-old boy living in New Jersey. The Alper family consists of Dad, an accountant; Mom, an English teacher; Steven, an enthusiastic and talented drummer who is also a self-described "skinny geek;" and Jeffrey, eight years younger, whom Steven describes as cute, adoring of his big brother, and apt to blurt out really embarrassing remarks about Steven in public.

When Jeffrey has a horrific nose bleed and goes to the emergency room, the Alpers are shocked to discover that he has leukemia. Mrs. Alper soon has to quit her job as a teacher while Mr. Alper shuts down, interacting minimally with Steven even when Mrs. Alper and Jeffrey are away in Philadelphia for Jeffrey's chemotherapy treatments.

Steven becomes very shelled in, but no one can really tell, except for a piano-prodigy classmate, Annette Watson, who persistently tries to find out what is the matter. Steven does not tell her or anyone else at school. He stops doing his homework, and eventually his guidance counselor and teachers push him to open up about what is going on.

His guidance counselor is a major help throughout the story. She advises him, "Instead of agonizing about the things you can't change, why don't you try working on the things you can change?"

At one point, Steven's mom becomes sick, so Steven and his father have to take Jeffrey to his treatment. There Steven meets Samantha, a girl with leukemia. Steven has his practice pad with him and lends her his drumsticks. She tells him how sad she is that her older sister has distanced herself from Samantha since her illness, and advises Steven to stay engaged in Jeffrey's life.

Steven and Annette play in the All-City band and Steven is to perform the big drum solo for the spring jazz concert. One night at band practice, the high-schoolers learn they have to do community service, which will force them to quit the band. Annette thinks of a way to bring the service into the band by using the spring concert as a benefit concert to help the Alpers pay their medical bills, and she and Renee work hard to make this a success. The night of the concert the band members shave their heads in solidarity with Jeffrey. Right before Steven's big solo that night, Jeffrey gets a fever and has to go back to the hospital. Taking Samantha's advice, Steven goes with him instead of staying to play his drum solo. When at the hospital, he decides to check on Sam, and learns she has died. A nurse gives him a package in which Samantha has returned the drumsticks Steven lent her when they met before.

At the end of the story, Jeffrey is in remission.

== Characters ==
Steven Alper – Steven is the protagonist, a drummer and an eighth grader. Steven has a sarcastic sense of humor and describes himself as highly annoyed by his little brother at the beginning of the story. Nonetheless, it is clear he takes his responsibilities as a big brother seriously and is in fact kind and protective towards Jeffrey. To begin with Steven has a crush on Renee Albert and is mildly friendly with Annette. By the end of the book he feels that he has become friends with Renee, and he is finding Annette beautiful.

Jeffrey Alper – Jeffrey, or 'Jeffy' is Steven's little brother who is diagnosed with acute lymphoblastic leukemia (ALL). Jeffrey is described by Steven as being 'too cute,' and he adores his brother. An issue throughout the book is the change in Jeffrey's looks as the illness gives him bruises, steroids make his face puffy, and chemotherapy causes his hair to fall out. Another issue the book addresses is how Jeffrey is really still a little boy and doesn't want to have to be serious all the time even when he feels sick.

Annette Watson – Annette is a friend of Steven's who sometimes watches Jeffy. She gets cross whenever Steven moons over Renee, pushes Steven to tell her what's wrong when he acts differently after Jeffrey's diagnosis, and tutors Steven when he has to make up his schoolwork. She's a brilliant pianist who hopes to attend classes at Juilliard in Manhattan. It is her idea to raise money for the Alper family by donating proceeds from the spring band concert.

Renee Albert – Renee is a cheerleader and math whiz. She is the object of most guys' affections and has a boyfriend named Biff. She pays more attention to Steven when she finds out what his family is dealing with. She is the one who tells their teacher, Ms. Palma, what's going on. She and Annette come together to help the family through a fundraiser.

Mr. Watras – Steven's music teacher of the All-City Jazz band. He is Steven's favorite teacher and his mentor.

Miss Palma – Steven's English teacher. She is the teacher that gives Steven the journal assignments in which Steven writes about his brother. In the Acknowledgments, Jordan Sonnenblick thanks his English teacher, Mrs. Palma.

Mrs. Galley – Steven's guidance counselor at his school. Steven talks to her a lot about his problems, mainly about Jeffrey having cancer and about a dream that he starts having that Jeffrey dies in the winter as Steven throws varying objects at him. She also rewards Steven for talking by giving him candy hearts.

Samantha – Steven's friend he meets at the hospital who also has leukemia. She ends up dying with her mom by her side but without her sister. She leaves Steven with the advice to stay with his brother every time he needs him.

Mrs. Alper – Steven's mother. At the beginning of the book we learn she is an English teacher, but after Jeffrey's diagnosis she leaves her job to care for him.

Mr. Alper – Mr. Alper is the dad of the 2 boys. His reaction to the news is to work harder, talk less, and worry about money late at night. His initial response to the fundraiser concert is to veto it, but he eventually goes along with the idea.

Mr. Stoll – Steven's drum instructor. Steven decides to help his family in their financial crisis by quitting lessons, as they cost money, but Mr. Stoll lets Steven have drum lessons for free.

Biff – A guitar player in the All-City Jazz band, who is also Renee Albert's boyfriend.

Grampa – Steven's Grandfather who refers to him as "Muscles" who gives Steven a pep talk when Jeffery was born about being his protector.

== Sequel ==
Drums, Girls, and Dangerous Pie is followed by After Ever After.
