= Jordan Sonnenblick =

American writer

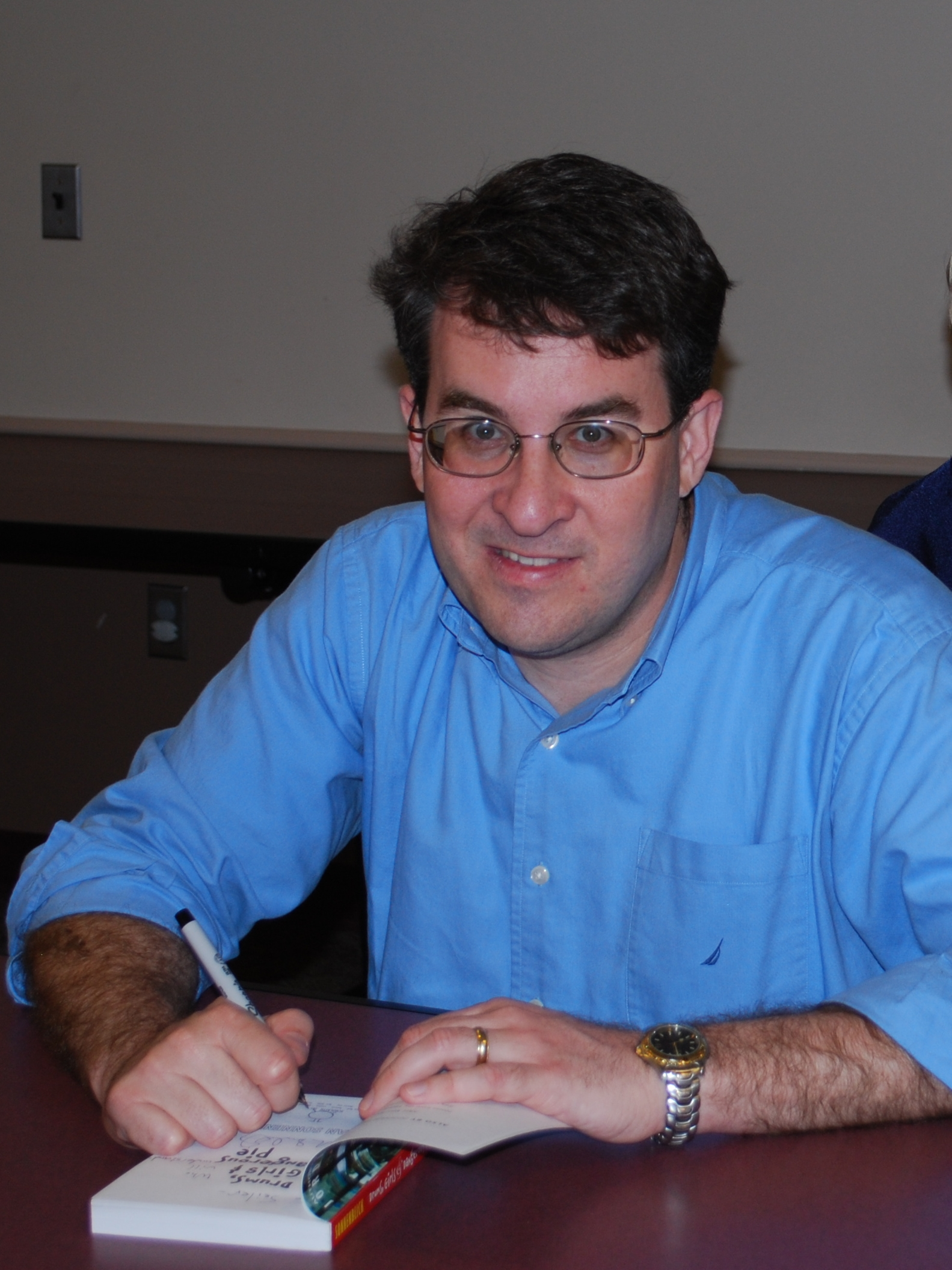
- Jordan Sonnenblick at a book signing in Eldersburg, Maryland
- Born: July 4, 1969 (age 57); Fort Leonard Wood, Missouri
- Occupation: Author
- Writing career
- Genre: Young Adult Literature
- Website: jordansonnenblick.com

Jordan Sonnenblick (born July 4, 1969) is an American writer of young adult fiction. He is a graduate of New York City's Stuyvesant High School (1987), and of the University of Pennsylvania.

== Personal life ==
Sonnenblick was born on July 4, 1969, in Fort Leonard Wood. He is from Staten Island, New York. In high school, he worked as both a tutor and a summer camp counselor. In 1994, after graduating from college, he married his wife and moved to Pennsylvania with her. He now resides in Bethlehem, Pennsylvania, with his wife and children. He frequently visits schools all over the United States, and sometimes internationally, to talk about his books. As of 2023, he has published 14 books since his career started back in 2004.

== Career ==
Sonnenblick taught 5th grade in Houston, Texas for three years, and 8th grade English at middle schools in Hackettstown and Phillipsburg in New Jersey for eleven years, before he retired to concentrate on writing books. His first novel, Drums, Girls, and Dangerous Pie, was inspired by one of his students, whose brother was battling cancer. He has always wanted to be an author and also plays the guitar, drums, and bass. He currently is substituting at Phillipsburg High School for sophomore English classes for the first semester of the 2023-24 school year.

== Books ==
- Drums, Girls, and Dangerous Pie (2004)
- Notes from the Midnight Driver (2006)
- Zen and the Art of Faking it (2007)
- Dodger and Me (2008)
- Dodger for President (2009)
- Dodger for Sale (2010)
- After Ever After (2010)
- Curveball: The Year I Lost My Grip (2012)
- Buddha-Boy (2012)
- Are You Experienced? (2013)
- Falling Over Sideways (2016)
- The Secret Sheriff of Sixth Grade (2017)
- The Boy Who Failed Show and Tell (2021)
- The Boy Who Failed Dodgeball (2022)
- Stepping Off (2024)
