= Ascendance Series =

Novel series by Jennifer A. Nielsen

- Cover for The False Prince, the first book in the series
- The False Prince (2012); The Runaway King (2013); The Shadow Throne (2014); The Captive Kingdom (2020); The Shattered Castle (2021)
- Author: Jennifer A. Nielsen
- Country: United States
- Language: English
- Genre: Juvenile fantasy
- Publisher: Scholastic Press
- Published: April 2012 – February 2014
- Media type: Print, e-book, audiobook
- Website: www.jennielsen.com/books/ascendance-trilogy

The Ascendance Series (formerly the Ascendance Trilogy) is a series of juvenile fantasy novels by Jennifer A. Nielsen. In the Ascendance Series, an orphan named Sage is kidnapped and trained to impersonate Prince Jaron, the missing Prince of Carthya. After Sage ascends the throne, he turns out to be prince Jaron, and he has to lead Carthya through a destructive war with multiple neighboring nations.

The first book in the series, The False Prince, was first released on April 1, 2012, through Scholastic Press. The book sold well and its paperback reprint placed The False Prince on The New York Times Best Seller list in May 2013. The second book, The Runaway King, was released on March 1, 2013, and the third book, The Shadow Throne, was released on February 25, 2014. In December 2019, Nielsen announced that a fourth book in the series would be published in October 2020, titled The Captive Kingdom, and also confirmed that she would be writing a fifth book in the series. The Captive Kingdom was released in October 2020. At the back of the book, an excerpt confirmed the title of the fifth novel to be The Shattered Castle.

Reception for the first book was mostly positive, but decreased to mixed for the second and third books. While Paramount Pictures licensed the movie rights for the series in 2012, they did not renew the contract for the series in 2017.

== Stories ==
=== The False Prince ===
Sage is a fourteen-year-old orphan who lives at an orphanage and steals roasts and other things from a local butcher, but is eventually caught. He is saved from the butcher by a nobleman named Bevin Conner who buys Sage from the orphanage owner. Conner is visiting different orphanages and buying teenage boys who resemble the missing prince Jaron, who was killed in a pirate attack, to replace the prince, and fool the court so that he can control whoever is on the throne. As Sage, Roden, and Tobias (other orphan boys) go through training to impersonate the prince, Sage meets Imogen, a servant girl who is believed to be mute, though she is not, and Mott, one of Conner's men, befriends Sage. Sage eventually develops feelings for Imogen, but does not act on them, for Princess Amarinda of Bultain is betrothed to the throne, and therefore, to him. Before leaving for the capital to fool the court, Mott figures out who Sage is, and puts himself in Sage's service. Sage finds out that whoever is not chosen by Conner will be killed. Roden is eventually chosen as prince, but after Sage does a coin trick only the prince could do, Conner removes Roden, and chooses Sage instead. Cregan, one of Conner's men, was talking to Roden and wanted Roden to kill Sage and Tobias to assume the throne by himself. After arriving in the capital and defeating Roden in a duel for the identity of the false prince, Sage goes inside and reveals Conner's plan, then reveals himself as the true prince Jaron who escaped the pirate attack in which the kingdom thought he was killed. Since Conner not only ordered the pirate attack on Prince Jaron and killed his parents, the King and Queen, with poison, Jaron assumes the title of The Ascendant King, and is crowned after imprisoning Conner, and posthumously declaring Imogen's father as a nobleman, making her a noble who stays at the castle, and making Tobias a noble as well.

=== The Runaway King ===
King Jaron is attacked by Roden, who is still furious over losing the throne to Jaron. Roden tells Jaron that he has joined the Avenian pirates, and that the pirates are seeking to kill Jaron because they failed to accomplish this the first time. Roden tells him that the pirates are giving Jaron ten days to surrender, or else they will attack Carthya. Jaron realizes that the pirates are in alliance with Avenia to kill him and destroy Carthya.

During the encounter, Roden threatened to kill a person dear to Jaron if he refuses to cooperate, and Jaron realizes that this person is none other than Imogen, so he decides to send her away to keep her safe. He lies, saying he has no feelings for her and he used her, hoping to put more distance between them. Imogen leaves the castle in anger. Jaron also visits Conner in prison, accompanied by Gregor, the captain of his guard. Conner tells him that the poison he used to kill Jaron's family came from the pirate king Devlin.

When the regents of the kingdom find out about the assassination attempt on Jaron, they propose that Jaron go into hiding for safety and appoint a steward to rule for him until he is of age. Jaron believes that they need to defend themselves, but the regents are all for following King Eckbert (his father)'s footsteps in avoiding war through negotiation. Jaron agrees to leave the castle, opting to return to Farthenwood with Tobias, but he leaves Tobias to impersonate him and escapes to face the pirates. Jaron finds a little girl and her mother, who is dying from a raid on the people of the countryside. the woman dies, but not after asking Jaron to take the little girl Nila to her grandfather's estate. they bury her, and move on. Jaron finds the man, named Rulon Harlowe and delivers Nila. He is so grateful that he invites Jaron to spend a night at Rulon Harlowe's estate. Harlowe treats him very kindly and urges him to stay longer, but Jaron departs for Avenia and arrives the next day. He is taken by Fink, a village thief boy, to Erick, leader of the Avenian thieves, and convinces Erick to take him to the pirates, supposedly to help them steal a vast amount of hidden Carthyan treasure.

To his surprise, Jaron discovers that Imogen is working for the pirates as a kitchen maid. Imogen tells him that she and Amarinda figured out that Jaron would come to the pirates, and Imogen decided to come as a last effort to discourage Jaron from his fool's errand. Devlin makes Jaron a pirate. Jaron gets Imogen to escape from the pirates on horseback with Fink, but Gregor, on his way to the pirates, comes upon them and brings them back. Jaron realizes that Gregor was a traitor. Gregor exposes Jaron's true identity to Devlin, but Jaron challenges his position as pirate king, and Devlin is obliged to answer as part of the pirate's code. Jaron wins, but surrenders to Devlin in exchange for Imogen's release.

Roden returns from sea early just as Jaron is about to be whipped, and becomes angry because he had been promised that he could deal with Jaron as he pleased. He kills Devlin and becomes the new pirate king. Considering his victory over Carthya as good as secure, Roden locks Jaron in a secure room with Erick and Fink and breaks Jaron's leg to ensure that no escape is possible. However, with aid from Erick and Fink, Jaron climbs escapes and challenges Roden as pirate king. As they spar, Jaron expresses his desire for Roden to come to his side and return to Carthya as the captain of his guard. Jaron loses narrowly, but Roden, having been won over by Jaron and recognizing Jaron's commitment to Carthya, surrenders and agrees to return with Jaron. Jaron goes back to Drylliad and finds that Tobias has convinced the regents not to replace Jaron with a steward. Jaron also makes Harlowe his new prime regent and mends his relationship with Amarinda. In the epilogue, Jaron is informed that Avenia has invaded Carthya and captured Imogen.

=== The Shadow Throne ===
Avenia, Gelyn, and Mendenwal are waging war against Carthya. Roden and Jaron have staged a public argument in hopes that his enemies will believe Carthya's armies are disorganized and quarrelsome, while providing a cover for Roden to march out to defend the borders. Jaron receives word that Imogen has been captured by Avenia, but Mott insists on taking the risk of rescuing Imogen in Jaron's stead. Jaron sends Amarinda, Tobias, and Fink to Amarinda's home country of Bymar for their safety and to ask for Bymar's aid.

When Jaron discovers that Avenia captured Imogen not to lure Jaron, but Mott, Jaron's most trusted man, to force information from Mott, he changes plans and breaks into the Avenian camp to rescue them. Mott escapes, but Imogen is shot with an arrow and presumed dead. Jaron is captured and after some time, Tobias joins him in his prison cell and is shocked to realize that Jaron is alive, as he and Amarinda overheard Avenian soldiers claiming that Jaron was dead. Upon hearing this, Amarinda decided to return to Drylliad to encourage and lead the people while Fink went on to request Bymar's aid, but Amarinda and Tobias were separated on the way back and Tobias was captured. They are held as prisoners until Mott and Harlowe rescue them from the camp. Before they leave Avenia, Jaron pays a visit to the Avenian pirates to request for their aid, but the pirates respond with unwillingness and anger. Erick assures Jaron that, whether or not the rest of the pirates come to Carthya's aid, he will aid Jaron.

On their way to Drylliad, they meet Amarinda. Jaron rejoins Roden in a battle at Drylliad, reinforced by Bymarian cavalry. A Bymarian soldier informs them that Fink refused to believe Jaron was dead, and tried to prove it by going to the Avenian camp to search for Jaron after he had succeeded in his mission of requesting Bymar's aid. Although the battle at Drylliad is eventually won, Jaron realizes that most of the soldiers were not Avenian, meaning this battle is just a distraction as the bulk of Avenian soldiers await a different mission. Jaron goes out to meet the enemy at a dry lake. Jaron contrives a plot to lure soldier into the lake before bursting the lake's dam and drowning them, and tricking those that remain into surrendering. But even as the enemy surrenders, the bulk of Avenia's armies arrive, vastly outnumbering the Carthyans. Jaron and his troops are trapped in the battle against Avenia and Mendenwal and are forced to retreat to the woods. During this time, Fink is able to rejoin Jaron.

Jaron surrenders to the Avenians to get a medical help for his soldiers. The Avenians take Jaron to Farthenwood; there, he meets Roden, who was captured, and Imogen, who did not die when she got shot. The next day, King Vargan of Avenia tells Jaron that since Tobias offered to trade his life for Jaron's, and they have two gallows built, Jaron can choose which two of the three of them will be hanged; Jaron says that he and Roden will go to the gallows.

At the gallows, Connor, who appears to have sided with the Avenians, subtly gives Jaron a knife, allowing Jaron to cut his and Roden's ropes. The Avenian pirates and the remaining Carthya soldiers fight with the soldiers of Gelyn, Mendenwal, and Avenia. While trying to escape, Jaron is cornered by Vargan and about to be killed, but Conner intervenes and is killed instead. Vargan is then betrayed his own commander, who has come to respect Jaron and wishes to surrender to end the bloodshed. Jaron makes peace with Mendenwal, Avenia, and Gelyn. Harlowe is revealed to be Roden's birth father, and the two are reunited. In the end, Jaron is married to Imogen and Tobias is married to Princess Amarinda.

=== The Captive Kingdom ===
Jaron is once again caught up in trouble across the sea with a group known as the Prozarians, widely thought to be extinct. He uncovers the deepest of secrets about his brother, Darius, that may well lead to the destruction of Carthya.

=== The Shattered Castle ===
The Throne of Carthya is once again in disarray and chaos. Will Jaron be able to save it this time?

== Inspiration ==
Nielsen had considered writing a book where someone was forced to impersonate royalty – the underlying premise for The False Prince – for some time. However, she had not yet conceived of a main character strong enough to carry the plot. At the time, Nielsen was working at a program for troubled youth and was struck by one boy who people doubted would succeed, but ended up being one of the first to achieve program milestones. He was the inspiration for Sage and helped pull the book together for Nielsen.

== Reception ==
Critical reception for the first book in the series was mostly positive. The False Prince was named one of the New York Times' Notable Children's Books of 2012. Praise for the first entry in the trilogy centered upon the book's appeal to a wide age group, as well as for the book's plotting and characters. Publishers Weekly gave it a starred review, calling it "highly enjoyable." However, the reviewer from The New York Times, describing the novel as a "grim story that takes an occasional, though only very occasional, mordant turn", concluded that it "makes the effort of reading worth the getting to the end" but that the "absence of a fully furnished world keeps this particular page turner from lingering very long after the book is closed".

Popular reception for the first book was also positive. The paperback reprint of The False Prince placed it on The New York Times Best Seller list in May 2013. It also won the 2015 Intermediate Sequoyah Book Award, which is voted upon by students in Oklahoma. Nielsen has been grateful for the response to the series from reluctant readers and their families.

Reception for the second entry was more mixed, with Publishers Weekly calling it a "solid sequel" but commenting that the book's villains were "perhaps too easily manipulated by the young king". Common Sense Media also gave a mixed review, criticizing Jaron's arrogance and saying that "the reasoning behind his reckless schemes is often unclear, so he seems to constantly put himself into needless danger". The Buffalo News, in a brief review, was more positive, stating that "Nielsen offers memorable characters, a complex world ... and a vivid political backdrop" and that the book raises good questions about war and personal sacrifice.

Reception for the third book was also mixed. Praise for the book came from how it provided a satisfying ending to the series and was "gripping," while the book was criticized for how the plot seemed unrealistic and the action was over-summarized.

In late 2012, Nielsen announced that film rights for the series had been purchased by Paramount Pictures with the intent to create a film series. Bryan Cogman was hired to adapt the first book in the series into a movie screenplay and Deborah Forte was announced as the film's producer. In March 2017, Nielsen announced that Paramount would not be renewing the contract for the series.
