= Richard Paul Evans =

American author

- Born: October 11, 1962 (age 63); Salt Lake City, Utah, U.S.
- Education: Cottonwood High School; University of Utah (BA)
- Spouse: Keri Evans
- Children: 5
- Writing career
- Genre: Novels
- Notable works: Michael Vey series, The Christmas Box

Richard Paul Evans (born October 11, 1962) is an American author, best known for writing The Christmas Box and, more recently, the Michael Vey series.

== Biography ==
Evans graduated from Cottonwood High School in Murray City, Utah. He graduated with a B.A. degree from the University of Utah in 1984.

While working as an advertising executive he wrote a Christmas story for his children. Unable to find a publisher or an agent, he self-published the work in 1993 as a paperback novella entitled The Christmas Box. He distributed it to bookstores in his community. The book became a local bestseller, prompting Evans to publish the book in this region.

The next year The Christmas Box hit #2 on The New York Times Best Seller list, inciting an auction for the publishing rights among the world's top publishing houses. Evans signed a publishing deal with Simon & Schuster, who paid him $4.2 million in an advance.

Released in hardcover in 1995, The Christmas Box became the first book to simultaneously reach the number-one position on the New York Times bestseller list for both paperback and hardcover editions. That same year, the book was made into a television movie of the same title, starring Richard Thomas and Maureen O'Hara.

Evans has subsequently written 36 nationally best-selling books, including some for children, with conservative Christian themes and appealing to family values. His 1996 book Timepiece was made into a television movie featuring Naomi Watts, James Earl Jones, and Ellen Burstyn, as were The Locket (1998), which starred Vanessa Redgrave; A Perfect Day (2006), which starred Rob Lowe and Christopher Lloyd; The Mistletoe Promise (2016), which starred Jaime King and Luke Macfarlane; and The Mistletoe Inn (2017), which starred Alicia Witt and David Alpay.

In the spring of 1997, Evans founded Christmas Box House International, an organization devoted to building shelters and providing services for abused and neglected children. As of 2017, more than 35,000 children had been served by Christmas Box House facilities.

Evans, a member of the Church of Jesus Christ of Latter-day Saints, lives in Salt Lake City, Utah with his wife Keri, five children, and one grandson.

He founded the group "Tribe of Kyngs" to combat feelings of isolation among men and the belief that "masculinity is no longer valued". Initiation into the group includes a coronation ceremony.

== Bibliography ==
=== Non-fiction ===
- The Christmas Box Miracle: My Spiritual Journey of Destiny, Healing, and Hope (2001)
- The Five Lessons a Millionaire Taught Me: About Life and Wealth (2004)
- The Five Lessons a Millionaire Taught Me for Women (2009)
- The Four Doors (2014)
- Sharing Too Much (2024)

=== Series ===
- The Christmas Box
  1. The Christmas Box (1995)
  2. Timepiece (1996)
  3. The Letter (1996)
- The Locket
  1. The Locket (1998)
  2. The Looking Glass (1999)
  3. The Carousel (2001)
- The Walk
  1. The Walk (2009)
  2. Miles to Go (2011)
  3. The Road To Grace (2012)
  4. A Step of Faith (2013)
  5. Walking on Water (2014)
- The Broken Road
  1. The Broken Road (2017)
  2. The Forgotten Road (2018)
  3. The Road Home (2019)
- Michael Vey
  1. Michael Vey: The Prisoner of Cell 25 (2011)
  2. Michael Vey: Rise of the Elgen (2012)
  3. Michael Vey: Battle of the Ampere (2013)
  4. Michael Vey: Hunt for Jade Dragon (2014)
  5. Michael Vey: Storm of Lightning (2015)
  6. Michael Vey: Fall of Hades (2016)
  7. Michael Vey: The Final Spark (2017)
  8. Michael Vey: The Parasite (2022)
  9. Michael Vey: The Traitor (2023)
  10. Michael Vey: The Colony (2024)

=== Novels ===
- Christmas Every Day, adapted from the William Dean Howells short story (1996)
- The First Gift of Christmas (1996)
- The Last Promise (2002)
- A Perfect Day (2003)
- The Sunflower (2005)
- Finding Noel (2006)
- The Gift (2007)
- Grace (2008), re-released as If Only (2015)
- The Christmas List (2009)
- Promise Me (2010)
- Lost December (2011)
- A Winter Dream (2012)
- The Mistletoe Promise (2014)
- The Mistletoe Inn (2015)
- The Mistletoe Secret (2016)
- The Noel Diary (2017)
- The Noel Stranger (2018)
- The Noel Street (2019)
- The Noel Letters (2020)
- The Christmas Promise (2021)
- A Christmas Memory (2022)

=== Children's books ===
- The Christmas Candle (1998)
- The Dance (1999)
- The Spyglass: A Book About Faith (2000)
- The Tower (2001)
- The Light of Christmas (2002)
