= Kwame Alexander =

American writer of poetry and children's fiction (born 1968)

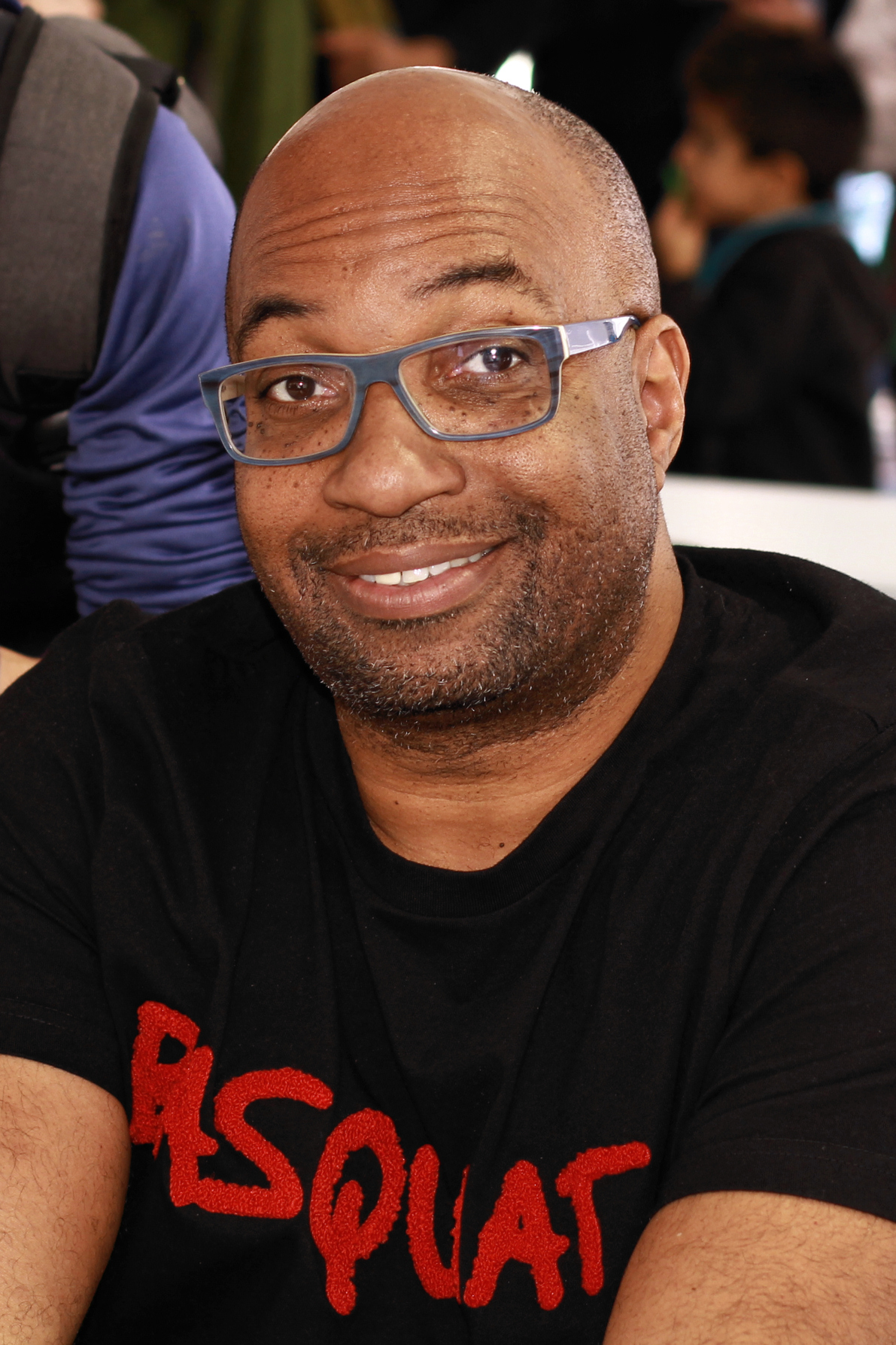
- Alexander at the 2019 Texas Book Festival
- Born: Edward Curtis Kwame Alexander II; August 21, 1968 (age 58); New York City, U.S.
- Education: Virginia Tech
- Occupation: Children's Book Author
- Spouse: Stephanie Stanley
- Writing career
- Genre: Children's literature
- Notable awards: John Newbery Medal; Coretta Scott King Author Honor; The Lee Bennett Hopkins Poetry Prize; 2017 Inaugural Pat Conroy Legacy Award
- Website: kwamealexander.com

Kwame Alexander (born August 21, 1968) is an American writer of poetry children's fiction.

== Personal life and education ==
Alexander was born in Manhattan, New York, and grew up in Virginia. His father was a scholar and book publisher and his mother was an educator.

Alexander attended Virginia Tech, where he began premedical studies before taking a writing class with award-winning poet Nikki Giovanni. On May 11, 2024, Alexander received an honorary doctorate degree from American University in Washington, DC.

== Books ==
Alexander's picture book Acoustic Rooster and His Barnyard Band was selected for the 2014 "Michigan Reads! One State, One Children's Book" program. He won a 2020 Newbery Honor for his illustrated poem The Undefeated.

Alexander runs the Bookinaday program to introduce children to writing and publishing. He is a regular contributor to National Public Radio's Morning Edition program.

The Door of No Return, a historical verse novel set in Ghana in 1861, told from the perspective of 11-year-old Kofi, was inspired by Alexander's visits to Ghana.

== Awards and honors ==
Alexander has received many awards as a writer, among them the 2017 Pat Conroy Legacy Award (an award that honors the example of acclaimed author Pat Conroy and recognizes writers who have achieved a lasting impact on their literary community), and his verse novel The Crossover won the 2015 Newbery Medal and was selected as an Honor book for the Coretta Scott King Award.

The Crossover, Booked, Out of Wonder, Solo, Becoming Mohammed Ali, The Undefeated, and The Door of No Return are New York Times bestselling books. The Undefeated is also an IndieBound bestseller.

In 2014, The Crossover was named one of the best books of the year by Kirkus Reviews and Shelf Awareness.

In 2016, Booked was named one of the best books of the year by Kirkus Reviews.

In 2017, Out of Wonder was named one of the best books of the year by Kirkus Reviews

The same year, Solo was named one of the best books of the year by Kirkus Reviews.

In 2018, Rebound was named one of the best books of the year by The Horn Book Magazine.

In 2019, The Undefeated was named one of the best books of the year by Kirkus Reviews and The Horn Book Magazine.

In 2020, Becoming Mohammed Ali was named one of the best books of the year by Kirkus Reviews.

In 2022, The Door of No Return was named one of the best books of the year by Kirkus Reviews, The Horn Book Magazine, and Shelf Awareness.

In 2023, the adaptation of The Crossover won the Outstanding Young Teen Series award at the second annual Children's and Family Emmy Awards, which took place in Los Angeles on 17 December 2023.

In 2024 Unspoken, was awarded School Library Association Winner for the Children's Choice Award.

Awards for Alexander's books
Year	Title	Award	Result	Ref.
2014	The Crossover	Cybil Award for Middle Grade Fiction	Finalist	
2014	The Crossover	Goodreads Choice Award for Middle Grade & Children's	Nominee	
2015	The Crossover	ALA Best Fiction for Young Adults	Top 10	
2015	The Crossover	ALSC Notable Children's Books	Selection	
2015	The Crossover	Coretta Scott King Award for Author	Honor	
2015	The Crossover	Newbery Medal	Winner	
2015	The Crossover	Quick Picks for Reluctant Young Adult Readers	Top 10	
2016	Booked	Cybil Award for Poetry	Finalist	
2016	Booked	Goodreads Choice Awards for Best Poetry	Nominee	
2016	Booked	National Book Award for Young People's Literature	Longlist	
2016	Booked	Rebecca Caudill Young Reader's Book Award	Nominee	
2017	The Crossover	ALSC Notable Children's Books	Selection	
2017	The Crossover	Rebecca Caudill Young Reader's Book Award	Winner	
2017	Solo	Goodreads Choice Awards for Poetry	Nominee	
2017	Out of Wonder	Cybil Award for Poetry	Finalist	
2017	Out of Wonder	Booklist Editors' Choice: Books for Youth	Selection	
2018	Rebound	Goodreads Choice Awards for Best Poetry	Nominee	
2018	Solo	NAACP Image Award for Outstanding Literary Work – Youth/Teens	Finalist	
2018	Out of Wonder	ALSC Notable Children's Books	Selection	
2018	Out of Wonder	Coretta Scott King Book Award for Illustrator	Winner	
2019	How to Read a Book	Goodreads Choice Awards for Best Picture Books	Nominee	
2019	Rebound	ALSC Notable Children's Recordings	Selection	
2019	Rebound	ALSC Notable Children's Books	Selection	
2019	Rebound	Carnegie Medal	Shortlist	
2019	Swing	Amazing Audiobooks for Young Adults	Selection	
2019	The Undefeated	Cybil Award for Fiction Picture Book	Finalist	
2019	The Undefeated	Goodreads Choice Awards for Best Picture Books	Nominee	
2019	The Undefeated	National Book Award for Young People's Literature	Longlist	
2020	How to Read a Book	ALSC Notable Children's Books	Selection	
2020	The Undefeated	Coretta Scott King Book Award for Illustrator	Winner	
2020	The Undefeated	Golden Kite Award	Honor	
2020	The Undefeated	Kirkus Prize	Finalist	
2020	The Undefeated	Newbery Medal	Honor	
2020	The Undefeated	Carter G. Woodson Book Award	Winner	
2021	Becoming Muhammad Ali	ALSC Notable Children's Books	Selection	
2023	The Door of No Return	ALA Best Fiction for Young Adults	Top 10	
2023	The Door of No Return	ALSC Notable Children's Books	Selection	
2023	The Door of No Return	Amazing Audiobooks for Young Adults	Top 10	

== Publications ==
- Tough Love: Cultural Criticism and Familial Observations on the Life and Death of Tupac Shakur, ed. (1996)
- Do the Write Thing (2002) (with Nina Foxx)
- Kwame Alexander's Page-to-Stage Writing Workshop (2016)

=== Novels ===
- He Said, She Said: A Novel (2013)
- The Crossover (2015)
- Booked (2016)
- The Playbook: 52 Rules to Aim, Shoot, and Score in This Game Called Life (2017)
- Solo (2017) (with Mary Rand Hess)
- Rebound (2018) (prequel to The Crossover)
- Swing (2018) (with Mary Rand Hess)
- The Door of No Return (2022)
- Why Fathers Cry at Night: A Memoir in Love Poems, Letters, Recipes, and Remembrances (2023)

=== Picture books ===
- Acoustic Rooster and His Barnyard Band (2011)
- Indigo Blume and the Garden City (2012)
- Little Boys Soar (2014)
- Surf's Up (2016)
- How to Read a Book (2019), illustrated by Melissa Sweet
- The Undefeated (2019), illustrated by Kadir Nelson
- An American Story (2023). Published in the UK as Unspoken (2023)

=== Poems ===
- The Flow: New Black Poets in Motion, ed. (1994)
- Just Us: Poems & Counterpoems, 1986–1995 (1995)
- 360°: A Revolution of Black Poets, ed. (1998)
- Kupenda: Love Poems (2000)
- Dancing Naked on the Floor: poems and essays (2005)
- The Way I Walk: short stories and poems for Young Adults, ed. (2006)
- Crush: Love Poems (2007)
- Family Pictures: Poems and Photographs Celebrating Our Loved Ones, ed. (2007)
- An American Poem (2008)
- And Then You Know: New and Selected Poems (2008)
- The Book Party (2016)
- The Playbook: 52 Rules to Aim, Shoot, and Score into in This Game Called Life (2017)
