= Betty Ren Wright =

American novelist

- Born: June 15, 1927; Wakefield, Michigan, U.S.
- Died: December 31, 2013 (aged 86); Racine, Wisconsin, U.S.
- Occupation: Writer
- Spouse: George A. Frederiksen (m. 1976)
- Writing career
- Period: 1981–2013 (novels)
- Genres: Children's fiction, ghost stories, picture book stories
- Notable works: Christina's Ghost; The Dollhouse Murders

Betty Ren Wright (June 15, 1927 – December 31, 2013) was an American writer of children's fiction including Christina's Ghost, The Dollhouse Murders, The Ghosts Of Mercy Manor and A Ghost in The House.

== Background ==
Wright lived in Kenosha, Wisconsin, with her husband, George A. Frederiksen, a painter. She also wrote several short stories such as Sweet remembrance and thirty-five picture books.

== Works ==
Novels

- Getting Rid of Marjorie (1981)
- The Secret Window (1982)
- The Dollhouse Murders (1983)
- Ghosts Beneath Our Feet (1984)
- Christina's Ghost (1985); also published as The Ghosts in the Attic
- The Summer of Mrs. MacGregor (1986)
- A Ghost in the Window (1987); sequel to The Secret Window
- The Pike River Phantom (1988)
- Rosie and the Dance of the Dinosaurs (1989); also published as The Midnight Mystery
- The Ghost of Ernie P (1990)
- The Scariest Night (1991)
- A Ghost in the House (1991)
- The Ghost of Popcorn Hill (1993)
- The Ghosts of Mercy Manor (1993)
- The Ghost Witch (1993)
- The Ghost Comes Calling (1994)
- Out of the Dark (1995)
- Nothing But Trouble (1995)
- Haunted Summer (1996)
- Getting Rid of Katherine (1996)
- Too Many Secrets (1997)
- The Ghost in Room 11 (1997)
- A Ghost in the Family (1998)
- The Phantom of Five Chimneys (1998)
- The Moonlight Man (2000)
- The Wish Master (2000)
- Crandall's Castle (2003)
- Princess for a Week (2006)

Selected picture book stories

- The Yellow Cat (1952)
- Jim Jump (1954)
- Roundabout Train (1958)
- I Want to Read (1965)
- The Cat Who Stamped His Feet (1975)
- Rodger's Upside Down Day (1979)
- I Like Being Alone (1981)
- The Time Machine (1981)
- Pet Detectives (1999)
- The Blizzard (2003)
- Rackety-Boom (1953)
- Johnny Go Round

Short Stories

The Invisible Cat (1958) Alfred Hitchcock's Magazine
