= The Crossover =

2014 novel by Kwame Alexander

- Author: Kwame Alexander
- Language: English
- Series: Crossover Series
- Published: 2014
- Publisher: HMH Books for Young Readers
- Publication place: United States
- Media type: Print, e-book, audiobook
- Pages: 251 pages
- Awards: Newbery Medal; Coretta Scott King Award Honor
- ISBN: 0544107713
- OCLC: 842316307
- LC Class: PZ7.5.A44 Cr 201
- Preceded by: Rebound

The Crossover is a 2014 children's book by American author Kwame Alexander and the winner of the 2015 Newbery Medal and Coretta Scott King Award Honor. The book, which is told entirely through verse, was first published in the United States in hardback on March 18, 2014, through HMH Books for Young Readers.

== Reception ==
Critical reception for The Crossover has been positive. According to Kirkus Reviews, "Poet Alexander deftly reveals the power of the format to pack an emotional punch." In Booklist, Gail Bush called The Crossover "a rare verse novel that is fundamentally poetic rather than using this writing trend as a device." Writing for the Washington Post, Mary Quattlebaum said Alexander was "at the top of his poetic game in this taut, complex tale of the crossover from brash, vulnerable boy to young adult." Poet Cornelius Eady wrote in The New York Times, "The biggest surprise of 'The Crossover' is that, for all the bells and whistles of a young man's game, it is most boldly and certainly a book about tenderness." According to Katrina Hedeen in The Horn Book Magazine, "Alexander brings the novel-in-verse format to a fresh audience with this massively appealing package for reluctant readers, athletes especially." Writing for School Library Journal, Kiera Parrott said, "Alexander has crafted a story that vibrates with energy and heart and begs to be read aloud. A slam dunk." The book has been used in many school curriculums, such as the controversial Wit and Wisdom.

== Television adaptation ==
In March 2021, it was announced that Disney+ had given a pilot order to a television adaptation of the book. Alexander and Damani Johnson will write the pilot and George Tillman Jr. will direct. In May 2021, it was announced that Jalyn Hall and Amir O'Neil were set to star in the pilot. In June 2021, it was announced that Derek Luke, Sabrina Revelle, Skyla I'lece, Deja Monique Cruz and Trevor Raine Bush joined the cast for the pilot. In February 2022, it was announced that Daveed Diggs would narrate the series.

Awards
Preceded by Flora & Ulysses	Newbery Medal; 2015	Succeeded by Last Stop on Market Street
