= Jennifer A. Nielsen =

American author

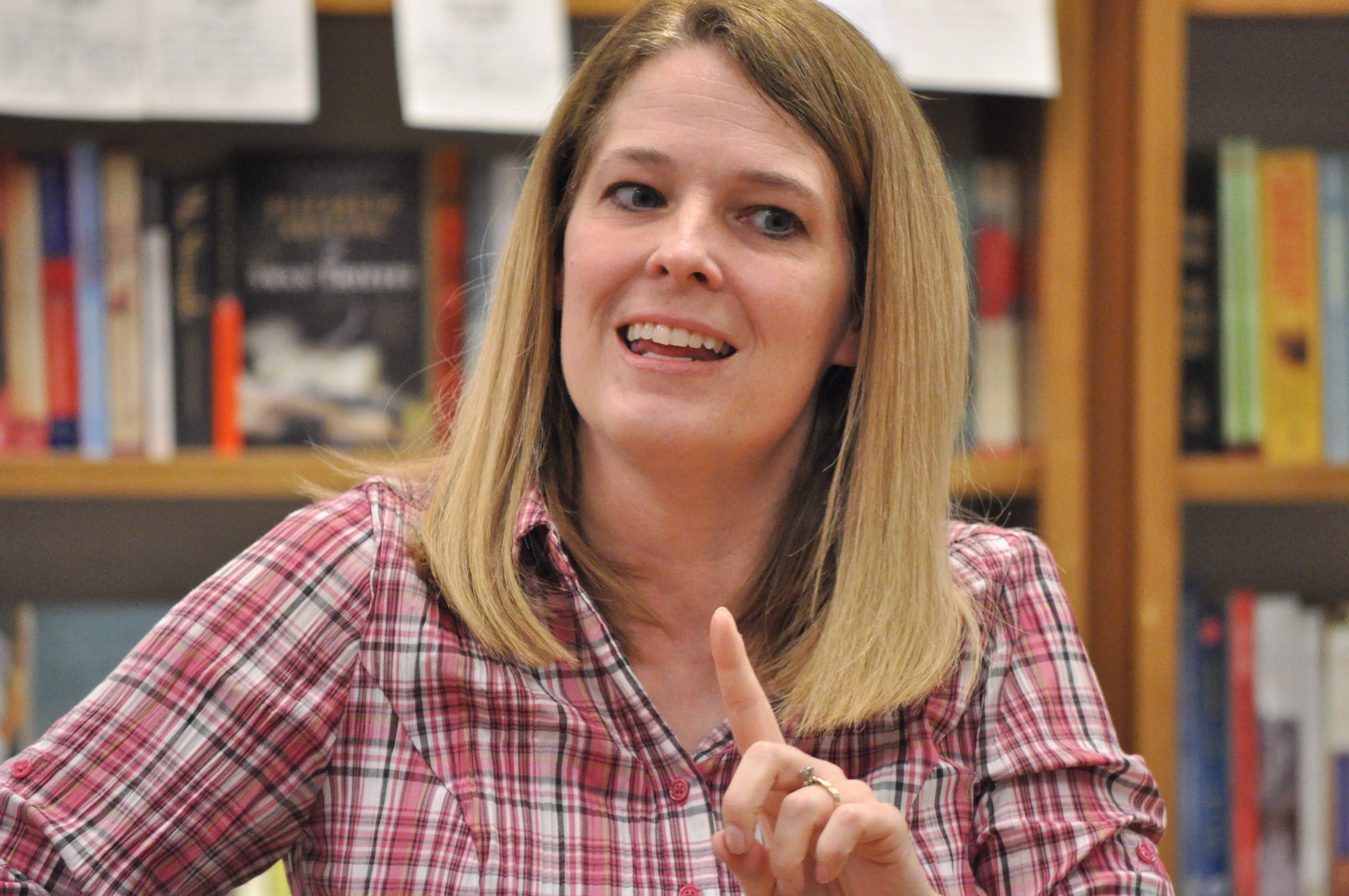
- Nielsen in 2013
- Born: July 10, 1971 (age 55); Northern Utah
- Occupation: Novelist
- Writing career
- Language: English
- Period: 2010–present
- Genre: Young adult fiction
- Notable work: Ascendance Trilogy
- Notable awards: Whitney Award
- Website: jennielsen.com

Jennifer Anne Nielsen (born July 10, 1971) is an American author known primarily for young adult fiction. Her works include the Ascendance Series, Behind Enemy Lines (one of the books in the Infinity Ring series), The Mark of the Thief, A Night Divided, and the Underworld Chronicles.

== Life ==
Jennifer was born and raised in bountiful, Utah and completed her first full manuscript, on picking locks, at the age of 11. However, it was abandoned when a locksmith did not allow her to research picking locks. She published Elliot and the Goblin War, the first Underworld Chronicles book, in 2010 and has continued publishing novels since.

In 2013, she won the Whitney Award for Best Middle-Grade Novel for The False Prince, the first novel in the Ascendance Trilogy, and the next year she won again in the same category for The Runaway King, its sequel. The paperback reprint of The False Prince put her on The New York Times Best Seller list in March 2013. The False Prince received a starred review from Publishers Weekly.

Nielsen lives in Northern Utah and is a practicing member of the Church of Jesus Christ of Latter-day Saints.

== Selected works ==
- A Night Divided. Scholastic. 2015. ISBN 978-0545682428.
- The Scourge. Scholastic Press. 2016. ISBN 978-0545682459.
- Resistance. Scholastic Press. 2018. ISBN 978-1338148473.
- Words on Fire. Scholastic Press. 2019. ISBN 978-1338275476.
- Rescue. Scholastic Press. 2021. ISBN 978-1338620993.
- Lines of Courage. Scholastic Press. 2022. ISBN 978-1338620931.
- Iceberg. Scholastic Press. 2023. ISBN 978-1338795028.
- Uprising. Scholastic Press. 2024. ISBN 978-1338795080.

=== The Ascendance series ===
- The False Prince. Scholastic, Inc. 2012. ISBN 978-0545284134.
- The Runaway King. Scholastic, Inc. 2013. ISBN 978-0545284158.
- The Shadow Throne. Scholastic, Inc. 2014. ISBN 978-0545284172.
- The Captive Kingdom. Scholastic, Inc. 2020. ISBN 1338551086
- The Shattered Castle. Scholastic, Inc. 2021. ISBN 9781338275902

=== Traitor's Game series ===
- The Traitor's Game. Scholastic Press. 2018. ISBN 978-1338045376.
- The Deceiver's Heart. Scholastic Press. 2019. ISBN 978-1338045413.
- The Warrior's Curse. Scholastic Press. 2020 ISBN 1338045458.

=== Mark of the Thief series ===
- Mark of the Thief. Scholastic Press. 2015. ISBN 978-0545561549.
- Rise of the Wolf. Scholastic Press. 2016. ISBN 978-0545562041.
- Wrath of the Storm. Scholastic Press. 2017. ISBN 978-0545562072.
