= Joniece Abbott-Pratt =

American actor and audiobook narrator

- Education: University of Iowa
- Website: jonieceabbott-pratt.com

Joniece Abbott-Pratt is an American actress and audiobook narrator, whose narrations have won her 14 Earphones Awards from AudioFile. Along with co-narrators, she also won the 2022 Audie Award for Short Stories or Collections for Blackout.

== Education and career ==
Abbott-Pratt was raised in Philadelphia. She earned a bachelor's degree at Clark Atlanta University, and a Master of Fine Arts degree in acting from the University of Iowa. While at Iowa she appeared in a 2004 hip-hop adaptation of the Greek tragedy Seven Against Thebes, and in a 2005 production of Suzan-Lori Parks' In the Blood, directed by Tisch Jones.

Abbott-Pratt has performed in numerous regional theater productions, as well as on television shows. In 2002, she was a teen actress in Kia Corthron's Breath, Boom in Atlanta. In 2009, she co-starred in Tracey Scott Wilson's The Good Negro in Hartford and New York. In 2013 she co-starred in a production of Lydia R. Diamond's Stick Fly in Philadelphia. In 2014 she appeared in Marcus Gardley's The House that Will Not Stand in New Haven. She has appeared in several plays by August Wilson, including Gem of the Ocean with Novella Nelson and Stephen Tyrone Williams in Hartford in 2011, and Seven Guitars in Louisville in 2015. Also in 2015, she co-starred with Keith Randolph Smith in Dominique Morisseau's Sunset Baby, and with Royce Johnson in Katori Hall's The Mountaintop. In 2019 she starred in Too Heavy for Your Pocket, a drama about the Freedom Riders by Jireh Breon Holder, at the George Street Playhouse in New Jersey.

Abbott-Pratt is an adjunct instructor in drama at New York University.

== Awards and honors ==
Abbott-Pratt was named "Best Emerging Actress" in 2003, by the Atlanta Constitution. In 2020, AudioFile included Abbott-Pratt's narration of Jordan Ifueko's Raybearer on their list of the best young adult audiobooks of the year, and in 2021, they included her narration of Ifueko's Redemptor on their list of the best young adult audiobooks of the year.

In 2022, AudioFile and Literary Hub named Abbott-Pratt's narration of Nightcrawling among the best fiction audiobooks of the year.

Awards for Abbott-Pratt's work
Year	Title	Award	Result	Ref.
2019	The Beginning of Everything	Earphones Award	Winner	
2020	Grown	Earphones Award	Winner	
2020	The Ministry for the Future	Earphones Award	Winner	
2020	Raybearer	Earphones Award	Winner	
2021	For All Time	Earphones Award	Winner	
2021	Legendborn	Amazing Audiobooks for Young Adults	Top 10	
2021	Raybearer	Amazing Audiobooks for Young Adults	Top 10	
2021	Raybearer	Audie Award for Fantasy	Finalist	
2021	Raybearer	Earphones Award	Winner	
2021	Revival Season	Earphones Award	Winner	
2021	Together We Will Go	Earphones Award	Winner	
2022	Blackout	Audie Award for Short Stories or Collections	Winner	
2022	Bloodmarked	Earphones Award	Winner	
2022	Four Hundred Souls	Audie Award for Multi-Voiced Performance	Finalist	
2022	How It Ends	Audie Award for Short Stories or Collections	Finalist	
2022	How It Ends	ITW Award for Best Audiobook	Finalist	
2022	Nightcrawling	Earphones Award	Winner	
2022	Off The Record	Amazing Audiobooks for Young Adults	Selection	
2022	Stories from the Tenants Downstairs	Earphones Award	Winner	
2022	Whiteout	Earphones Award	Winner	
2023	Love Radio	Audie Award for Young Adult Title	Finalist	
2023	Nightcrawling	Audie Award for Best Female Narrator	Finalist	
2023	The Sex Lives of African Women	Audie Award for Nonfiction	Finalist	
2023	The New Earth	Earphones Award	Winner	
2023	Nic Blake and the Remarkables: The Manifestor Prophesy	Earphones Award	Winner	
2024	One Blood	Audie Award for Fiction	Finalist	

== Narrations ==
Books narrated by Abbott-Pratt
Year	Title	Author	Other narrator(s)	Ref.
2019	The Beginning of Everything	Kristen Ashley	Liz Thompson, Dina Pearlman, Stella Bloom, Esther Wane, Gemma Dawson, Robin Miles, Clara Francesca, Lance Greenfield, Jakobi Diem, Ralph Lister, John Hartley, Rupert Channing, and Sarah Coomes	
2019	Lady Tigers in the Concrete Jungle: How Softball and Sisterhood Saved Lives in the South Bronx	Dibs Baer		
2019	Like Sisters on the Homefront	Rita Williams-Garcia		
2019	One Night in Georgia	Celeste O. Norfleet		
2020	All the Things We Never Knew	Liara Tamani	Preston Butler III	
2020	Burn	Patrick Ness		
2020	Grown	Tiffany D. Jackson		
2020	Legendborn	Tracy Deonn		
2020	The Ministry for the Future	Kim Stanley Robinson	Jennifer Fitzgerald, Fajer Al-Kaisi, Ramon de Ocampo, Gary Bennett, Raphael Corkhill, Barrie Kreinik, Natasha Soudek, Nikki Massoud, Ines del Castillo, and Vikas Adam	
2020	Raybearer	Jordan Ifueko		
2020	The Office of Historical Corrections	Danielle Evans	Nicole Lewis, Brittany Pressley, Shayna Small, January LaVoy, Adenrele Ojo, and Janina Edwards	
2020	The Wrong Mr. Darcy	Evelyn Lozada and Holly Lorincz		
2021	Blackout	Dhonielle Clayton, Tiffany D. Jackson, Nic Stone, Angie Thomas, Ashley Woodfolk, and Nicola Yoon	Dion Graham, Imani Parks, Jordan Cobb, Shayna Small, A.J Beckles, and Bahni Turpin	
2021	Caul Baby	Morgan Jerkins		
2021	For All Time	Shanna Miles	Landon Woodson	
2021	How It Ends	Rachel Howzell Hall		
2021	The Other Black Girl	Zakiya Dalila Harris	Aja Naomi King, Heather Alicia Simms, and Bahni Turpin	
2021	Redemptor	Jordan Ifueko		
2021	Revival Season	Monica West		
2021	Together We Will Go	J. Michael Straczynski	Dan Bittner, Neo Cihi, Michael Crouch, Samantha Desz, Kyla Garcia, Jonathan Todd Ross, Fred Sanders, Tara Sands, Shaun Taylor-Corbett, Kevin R. Free, and Aden Hakimi	
2022	Because Claudette	Tracey Baptiste		
2022	Blood Like Fate	Liselle Sambury		
2022	Bloodmarked	Tracy Deonn		
2022	Love Radio	Ebony LaDelle	JaQwan J. Kelly	
2022	Nightcrawling	Leila Mottley		
2022	Quantum Girl Theory	Erin Kate Ryan	Saskia Maarleveld and P. J. Ochlan	
2022	The Sex Lives of African Women	Nana Darkoa Sekyiamah	Iesha Nyree, Adenrele Ojo, Deanna Anthony, Stephanie Weeks, Joy Hooper, Lisa Reneé Pitts, Karen Murray, Janina Edwards, M. J. Brown, and Karla Mosley	
2022	Stories from the Tenants Downstairs	Sidik Fofana	Nile Bullock, Sidik Fofana, Dominic Hoffman, DePre Owens, André Santana, Bahni Turpin, and Jade Wheeler	
2022	Whiteout	Dhonielle Clayton, Tiffany D. Jackson, Nic Stone, Angie Thomas, Ashley Woodfolk, and Nicola Yoon	Danielle Shemaiah, Nic Stone, Shayna Small, Bahni Turpin, Alaska Jackson, Kevin R. Free, James Fouhey, and Korey Jackson	
2022	Yonder	Jabari Asim	Lamarr Gulley, JD Jackson, Adam Lazarre-White, Imani Jade Powers, and Janina Edwards	
2023	Blood Debts	Terry J. Benton-Walker	Zeno Robinson, Bahni Turpin, and Torian Brackett	
2023	The Davenports	Krystal Marquis		
2023	The House is on Fire	Rachel Beanland	Andi Arndt, Michael Crouch, and Ruffin Prentiss III	
2023	Like, Literally, Dude: Arguing for the Good in Bad English	Valerie Fridland	Valerie Fridland, Keylor Leigh, Andrew Eiden, Christopher Ryan Grant, Ellen Archer, Eileen Stevens, and Nicky Endres	
2023	Lone Women	Victor LaValle		
2023	The New Earth	Jess Row	Jim Meskimen, Jaime Lamchick, Jason Culp, Robin Miles, Ron Butler, Inés del Castillo, Gary Tiedemann, Sheldon Romero, Josh Bloomberg, Aylam Orian, and Vaneh Assadourian	
2023	Nic Blake and the Remarkables: The Manifestor Prophesy	Angie Thomas		

== Filmography ==
Abbott-Pratt's filmography
Year	Title	Media	Role	Notes
2007	Why Did I Get Married?	Film	College Student #3	
2013	Grand Theft Auto V	Video game	Local Population (voice)	
2015	American Odyssey	TV	Margaret	1 episode
2015	Orange Is the New Black	TV	Ultrasound technician	1 episode
2015	Show Me A Hero	TV	Woman	2 episodes
2016	Law & Order: Special Victims Unit	TV	Latanya Franks; Marisa	2 episodes
2017	Blindspot	TV	Charly Evon	1 episode
2018	Instinct	TV	Ashley	1 episode
2016-2018	Luke Cage	TV	Etta Lucas	2 episodes
2019	The Good Fight	TV	Monique Cromley	1 episode
2020	FBI: Most Wanted	TV	Michelle Carter	1 episode
2020	The Annex	TV	Joniece	
2021	Evil	TV	Ashley	1 episode
2022	Dynasty	TV	Nurse Julia	1 episode
