= Bahni Turpin =

American actor (born 1962)

Bahni Turpin (born June 4, 1962) is an American audiobook narrator and stage and screen actor based out of Los Angeles. Her audiobook career includes some of the most popular and critically acclaimed books in recent years, including The Help and The Hate U Give. She has won 9 Audie Awards, including Audiobook of the Year for Children of Blood and Bone; 14 Earphone Awards; and 2 Odyssey Awards. Turpin has also earned a place on AudioFile magazine's list of Golden Voice Narrators, and in 2016, she was named Audible's Narrator of the Year.

In 2018, Audible inducted Bahni Turpin into the Narrator Hall of Fame.

== Early life ==
Turpin was born in Pontiac, Michigan.

== Career ==
Turpin began her acting career in 1991 with her debut role in the film Daughters of the Dust, the first feature film directed by an African-American woman distributed theatrically in the United States. She has since appeared on television shows such as Criminal Minds.

Turpin is also a member of the Cornerstone Theater Company.

Outside of acting, Turpin has been a long-time yoga instructor.

== Reviews ==
Discussing the power Turpin brings to every role she plays, Audible wrote, "Turpin's embodiment of characters helps to further pull you into the author's world and drive home all of the pain and emotion they are carrying." They continued, stating that "her embodiment of characters that span a wide range of ages and cultural backgrounds is unparalleled."

Publishers Weekly wrote of House of Rougeaux: "Actor Turpin's skill with a vast array of accents brings the characters of Jaeckel's multigenerational novel to life. …Turpin's multifaceted performance enhances this rich tapestry of a novel." Of The Hate U Give, the same website wrote "Turpin's remarkable sensitivity carries this performance to the ranks of greatness."

== Awards and honors ==
=== Awards ===
Year	Title	Award	Result	Ref.
2010	The Help	Audie Award for Fiction	Winner	
2010	Precious	Earphones Award	Winner	
2010	The True Meaning of Smekday	Earphones Award	Winner	
2011	The Immortal Life of Henrietta Lacks	Audie Award for Nonfiction	Winner	
2011	The True Meaning of Smekday	Odyssey Award	Winner	
2012	The Mighty Miss Malone	Earphones Award for Children	Winner	
2013	Hold Fast	Listen Up Award for YA/Children's	Finalist	
2014	Sugar	Audie Award for Middle Grade Title	Finalist	
2015	Unstoppable Octobia May	Audie Award for Middle Grade Title	Finalist	
2015	Yellow Crocus	Audie Award for Solo Narration – Female	Winner	
2016		Audible Narrator of the Year	Winner	
2016	Citizens Creek	Audie Award for Fiction	Finalist	
2016	Jump Back, Paul	Audie Award for Middle Grade Title	Finalist	
2016	The Underground Railroad	Publishers Weekly's Narrator of the Year	Winner	
2017	Sister of Mine	Audie Award for Fiction	Winner	
2017	The Underground Railroad	Audie Award for Audiobook of the Year	Finalist	
2017	The Underground Railroad	Audie Award for Best Female Narrator	Finalist	
2017	The Underground Railroad	Audie Award for Literary Fiction or Classics	Finalist	
2018		Audible Narrator Hall of Fame	Winner	
2018	Children of Blood and Bone	Audie Award for Audiobook of the Year	Winner	
2018	Children of Blood and Bone	Earphones Award	Winner	
2018	The Hate U Give	Odyssey Award	Winner	
2018	The Hate U Give	Audie Award for Best Female Narrator	Winner	
2019		AudioFile Golden Voice Narrator	Winner	
2019	Ada Twist and the Perilous Pants	Earphones Award	Winner	
2019	Before She Was Harriet	Audie Award for Young Listeners' Title	Winner	
2019	Look Both Ways	Earphones Award	Winner	
2019	Red at the Bone	Earphones Award	Winner	
2019	The Yellow House	Earphones Award for Biography & Memoir	Winner	
2019	Zora and Langston	Earphones Award	Winner	
2020	The Book of Lost Friends	Earphones Award for Historical Fiction	Winner	
2020	Charlotte's Web	Audie Award for Middle Grade	Winner	
2020	Charlotte's Web	Earphones Award	Winner	
2020	Fighting Words	Earphones Award for Children	Winner	
2020	Pew	Earphones Award for Fiction	Winner	
2020	Red at the Bone	Audie Award for Literary Fiction or Classics	Finalist	
2021	Fighting Words	Odyssey Award	Honoree	
2021	Pew	Audie Award for Literary Fiction or Classics	Finalist	
2022	Blackout	Audie Award for Short Stories/Collections	Winner	
2022	The Best American Short Stories 2021	Audie Award for Short Stories/Collections	Finalist	
2022	The Final Revival of Opal & Nev	Audie Award for Fiction		
2022	The Final Revival of Opal & Nev	Earphones Award	Winner	

=== Best of the Year lists ===
Year	Title	List	Ref.
2007	New England White	Listen Up Award for Mystery	
2009	The Help	ListenUp Award for Fiction	
2010	Precious	AudioFile Best of Fiction	
2011	Precious	Amazing Audiobooks for Young Adults	
2011	The True Meaning of Smekday	Amazing Audiobooks for Young Adults	
2011	The True Meaning of Smekday	Notable Children's Recordings	
2012	Bird in a Box	AudioFile Best Children's Audiobooks	
2012	The Mighty Miss Malone	AudioFile Best of 2012: Children's	
2012	The Other Half of My Heart	Notable Children's Recordings	
2013	The Mighty Miss Malone	Notable Children's Recordings	
2016	Jump Back, Paul	Notable Children's Recordings	
2016	The Sun is Also a Star	Publishers Weekly Best Audiobooks of 2016	
2016	'Til the Well Runs Dry	Listen List	
2016	The Underground Railroad	Publishers Weekly Best Audiobooks of 2016	
2017	The Hate U Give	Publishers Weekly Best Audiobooks for Children's/YA	
2017	A Kind of Freedom	The Washington Post, Best Audiobooks	
2017	Unbound	Notable Children's Recordings	
2018	The Hate U Give	Amazing Audiobooks for Young Adults	
2018	The Hate U Give	Notable Children's Recordings	
2018	The Sun is Also a Star	Amazing Audiobooks for Young Adults	
2019	Ada Twist and the Perilous Pants	AudioFile Best Children & Family Listening	
2019	American Spy	AudioFile Best Mystery & Suspense	
2019	Before She Was Harriet	Notable Children's Recordings	
2019	Children of Blood and Bone	Amazing Audiobooks for Young Adults	
2019	Children of Blood and Bone	Notable Children's Recordings	
2019	The Darkest Child	The Listen List	
2019	Look Both Ways	AudioFile Best Biography & Children & Family Listening	
2019	Red at the Bone	AudioFile Best Fiction, Poetry & Drama	
2019	Zora and Langston	AudioFile Best Biography & History	
2020	Black Enough	Amazing Audiobooks for Young Adults	
2020	On the Come Up	Notable Children's Recordings	
2020	On the Come Up	Amazing Audiobooks for Young Adults	
2020	Red at the Bone	The Listen List	
2020	Roller Girl	Amazing Audiobooks for Young Adults	
2020	Spin	Amazing Audiobooks for Young Adults	
2020	When the Ground is Hard	Notable Children's Recordings	
2020	When Stars Are Scattered	AudioFile Best Children's	
2020	When Stars Are Scattered	Booklist Editors' Choice: Youth Audio	
2021	145th Street	Amazing Audiobooks for Young Adults	
2021	The 1619 Project: A New Origin Story	Booklist Editors' Choice: Adult Audio	
2021	Fighting Words	Amazing Audiobooks for Young Adults	
2021	Fighting Words	Notable Children's Recordings	
2021	From the Desk of Zoe Washington	Amazing Audiobooks for Young Adults	
2021	From the Desk of Zoe Washington	Notable Children's Recordings	
2021	Look Both Ways	Amazing Audiobooks for Young Adults	
2021	The Snow Fell Three Graves Deep	Amazing Audiobooks for Young Adults	
2021	This is My America	Amazing Audiobooks for Young Adults	
2021	Tiny Imperfections	The Listen List	
2022	Cinderella Is Dead	Amazing Audiobooks for Young Adults	
2022	Sugar Town Queens	Amazing Audiobooks for Young Adults	

== Selected narrations ==
Books narrated by Bahni Turpin
Year	Title	Author(s)	Other Narrator(s)	Note
2006	A Piece of Cake	Cupcake Brown		
2009	The Help	Kathryn Stockett,	Octavia Spencer and Jenna Lamia	
2009	Precious	Sapphire		First published in 1996
2010	The Immortal Life of Henrietta Lacks	Rebecca Skloot	Cassandra Campbell	
2011	Pigeon English	Stephen Kelman		
2012	The Mighty Miss Malone	Christopher Paul Curtis		
2012	The Twelve Tribes Of Hattie	Ayana Mathis	Adenrele Ojo and Adam Lazarre-White	
2014	Bad Feminist	Roxane Gay		
2015	Everything, Everything	Nicola Yoon	Robbie Daymond	
2016	Hidden Figures	Margot Lee Shetterly		
2016	If Beale Street Could Talk	James Baldwin		First published in 1974
2016	The Sun Is Also a Star	Nicola Yoon	Raymond Lee and Dominic Hoffman	
2016	The Underground Railroad	Colson Whitehead		
2016	Grimm's Fairy Tales	Jacob Grimm and Wilhelm Grimm	Graeme Malcolm, Scott Brick, Davina Porter, Dion Graham, and Edoardo Ballerini	First published in 1909
2017	The Hate U Give	Angie Thomas		
2017	They Both Die at the End	Adam Silvera	Michael Crouch and Robbie Daymond	
2017	There's Someone Inside Your House	Stephanie Perkins		
2018	Children Of Blood And Bone	Tomi Adeyemi		
2018	So You Want to Talk About Race	Ijeoma Oluo		
2018	A Spark of Light	Jodi Picoult		
2019	Children of Virtue and Vengeance	Tomi Adeyemi		
2019	Look Both Ways	Jason Reynolds	Jason Reynolds, Heather Alicia Simms, Chris Chalk, Adenrele Ojo, Kevin R. Free, J.D. Jackson, Guy Lockard, January LaVoy, and David Sadzin	
2019	On the Come Up	Angie Thomas		
2019	The Starless Sea	Erin Morgenstern	Dominic Hoffman, Dion Graham, Fiona Hardingham, Allan Corduner, and Jorjeana Marie	
2019	American Spy	Lauren Wilkinson		
2020	Cinderella Is Dead	Kalynn Bayron		
2020	The Southern Book Club's Guide to Slaying Vampires	Grady Hendrix		
2020	Transcendent Kingdom	Yaa Gyasi		
2020	The Yellow House	Sarah M. Broom		
2021	Blackout	Dhonielle Clayton, Tiffany D. Jackson, Nic Stone, Angie Thomas, Ashley Woodfolk, Nicola Yoon	Joniece Abbott-Pratt, Dion Graham, Imani Parks, Jordan Cobb, Shayna Small, A.J. Beckles	
2021	Chains	Laurie Halse Anderson		First published in 2008
2021	The Other Black Girl	Zakiya Dalila Harris	Aja Naomi King, Joniece Abbott-Pratt, and Heather Alicia Simms	
2021	Passing	Nella Larsen		First published in1929
2022	The Day the Crayons Came Home	Drew Daywalt with Oliver Jeffers (Illus.)	Barrett Leddy, Jesús E. Martínez, MacLeod Andrews, Ron Butler, Michael Crouch, Taylor Meskimen, Rob Shapiro, Tara Sands, Almarie Guerra, Jamie K. Brown, and Daniel Henning	First published in 2015
2022	Recitatif	Toni Morrison	Zadie Smith	First published in 1983
2023	The Hork-Bajir Chronicles (from Animorphs)	K.A. Applegate	Michael Crouch, Natasha Soudek, and Mark Turetsky	First published in October 1998

== Filmography ==
Year	Title	Role	Notes
1991	Daughters of the Dust	Iona Peazant	
1992	Rain Without Thunder	'Baby Bomb' Prisoner	
1992	Malcolm X	Follower at Temple #7	
1993	Law & Order	Theresa Jones	Episode: Night & Fog
1993	The Saint of Fort Washington	Gloria	
1994	Getting In	Valerie Bookbinder	
1994	Rebel Highway	Melba Mason	Episode: Girls in Prison
1994	Girls in Prison	Melba	
1994	Since Lisa		
1995	The Jeff Foxworthy Show	Nicki	Episode: The Gene Pool
1996	Star Trek: Voyager	Ensign Swinn / Swinn	Episodes: Resolutions; Tuvix
1996	In the House	Zelda	Episode: The Curse of Hill House
1996	Lois & Clark: The New Adventures of Superman	Carly	Episode: Stop the Presses
1997	Women: Stories of Passion	'Angel' Actress	Episode: Grip Till It Hurts
1998	Seinfeld	Waitress #1	Episode: The Wizard
1998	Chicago Hope	Sandra, the Kronk's Neighbor	Episode: The Breast and the Brightest
1998	The Pretender	Nurse Roberts	Episode: Parole
1998	L. A. Doctors	Miss Corelli	Episode: Leap of Faith
1999	Brokedown Palace	Jamaican Prisoner	
1999	Undressed	Dani	Episodes: The Ex-Files; If Words Could; If Words Could Kill #2; The Ex-Files #2; Twice a Virgin
2000	Family Law		Episode: Playing God
2000	ER	Mrs. Lattimer	Episode: Loose Ends
2000	Strong Medicine	Charlotte Gould	Episode: Dependency
2000	Dharma & Greg	Mary	Episode: Love, Honor, and Ole!
2001	NYPD Blue	Louise Dunner	Episode: Russellmania
2001	Judging Amy	Atty. Carmen Devere	Episode: Imbroglio
2001	The Steve Harvey Show	Jeanette	Episode: Stuck on You
2002	Crossroads	Ms. Jenson	
2003	The Parkers	Madame Patrice	Episode: Love Potion #83
2003	Mister Sterling		Episode: The Statewide Swing
2003	Crossing Jordan	Bahni / Bonny	Episodes: Dead Wives' Club; Family Ties
2003	Girlfriends	Anita	Episode: Snoop, There It Is
2004	The Guardian	Megan's Lawyer	Episode: All Is Mended
2004	Soul Food	Danielle	Episode: Take It to the Limit
2004	Pryor Offenses	Patty	
2004-2005	Cold Case	Lindsey Dunlay	Episodes: Frank's Best; Family; Maternal Instincts
2005	Six Feet Under	Wolf's Girlfriend	Episode: Dancing for Me
2005	The Comeback	Yoga Instructor	Episode: Valerie Gets a Magazine Cover
2006	The Bernie Mac Show	Kai	Episode: It's Never as Bad as the First Time
2006	Out of the Woods		
2006	What About Brian	Baby Dance Instructor	Episode: What About Second Chances
2007	Lincoln Heights	Vera	Episodes: Abduction; Obsession
2009	Without A Trace	Shannon	Episode: Daylight
2009	Mental	Louisa Knox	Episode: Do Over
2009	Buona Fortuna	Sylvia	
2012	Pretty Little Liars	Hotline Counselor	Episode: A Hot Piece of A
2016	Criminal Minds: Beyond Borders	Lieutenant Ananda Doshi	Episode: Iqiniso
2017	Chance	Watson	Episode: The Collected Works of William Shakespeare
2018	O. G.	Ludlow	
2018	Code Black	Meryl	Episode: Better Angels
2019	The Case for Loving: The Fight for Interracial Marriage	Narrator	
2020	NCIS	Camille West	Episode: Blood and Treasure
2021	9-1-1: Lone Star	Judy	Episode: Dust to Dust
2021	Farrina	Farrina	Episodes: I Insist; Where We Are From; Go on and Sit Here
2022	If Sharks Disappeared		
