= Shayna Small =

American actor, musician, and audiobook narrator

Shayna Small is an American actor, musician, and audiobook narrator.

== Personal life ==
Small attended the Baltimore School for the Arts and received a Bachelor of Fine Arts in Drama from the Juilliard School.

== Career ==
Since graduating from the Juilliard School, she has taught and mentored at the ASTEP, Baltimore School for the Arts, CenterStage, Helen Hayes Foundation, Showdown Theatre Snow College, and Stella Adler Conservatory. She has also served as an Arts Ambassador for the Boys and Girls Club of Greater Washington, as well as an acting coach for operetta Qadar under the artistic direction of Denyce Graves.

Beyond her career as an actress and audiobook narrator, Small has sung at The Apollo, DC Jazz Fest, Joe's Pub, The Kennedy Center, Lincoln Center, Les Poisson Rouge, and Saturday Night Live.

== Awards and honors ==
=== Awards ===
Year	Title	Author(s)	Other narrator(s)	Award		Result
2018	How Long 'Til Black Future Month? Stories (2018)	N.K. Jemisin	Gail Nelson-Holgate, Robin Ray Eller, Ron Butler, Kevin Stillwell, Je Nie Fleming, and Jeanette Illidge	Earphones Award	Winner	
2019	Red at the Bone (2019)	Jacqueline Woodson	Jacqueline Woodson, Quincy Tyler Bernstine, Peter Francis James, and Bahni Turpin	Earphones Award	Winner	
2020	Overground Railroad (2020)	Lesa Cline-Ransome	Shayna Small and Lesa Cline-Ransome (author's note)	Earphones Award	Winner	
2021	The Kindest Lie (2021)	Nancy Johnson		Earphones Award	Winner	
2021	Last Stop from Innocence (2021)	Takerra Allen		Earphones Award	Winner	
2021	The Overground Railroad (2020)	Lesa Cline-Ransome	Shayna Small	Audie Award for Young Listeners' Title	Winner	
2022	Blackout	Dhonielle Clayton, Tiffany D. Jackson, Nic Stone, Angie Thomas, Ashley Woodfolk, and Nicola Yoon	Joniece Abbott-Pratt, Imani Parks, Jordan Cobb, Shayna Small, A.J. Beckles, and Bahni Turpin	Audie Award for Short Stories or Collections	Winner	

=== Best of lists ===
Year	Title	Author	Other Narrator(s)	
2019	Red at the Bone (2019)	Jacqueline Woodson	Jacqueline Woodson, Quincy Tyler Bernstine, Peter Francis James, and Bahni Turpin	AudioFile Best of Fiction, Poetry & Drama
2020	How Long 'Til Black Future Month? Stories (2018)	N.K. Jemisin	Gail Nelson-Holgate, Robin Ray Eller, Ron Butler, Kevin Stillwell, Je Nie Fleming, and Jeanette Illidge	Amazing Audiobooks for Young Adults
2020	Red at the Bone (2019)	Jacqueline Woodson	Jacqueline Woodson, Quincy Tyler Bernstine, Peter Francis James, and Bahni Turpin	Listen List
2020	Overground Railroad (2020)	Lesa Cline-Ransome	Dion Graham and Lesa Cline-Ransome (author's note)	AudioFile Best of Children's Title
2020	The Vanishing Half (2020)	Brit Bennett		AudioFile Best of Fiction
2021	The Vanishing Half (2020)	Brit Bennett		Listen List
2022	Flyy Girls	Ashley Woodfolk		Amazing Audiobooks for Young Adults
2022	The Gilded Ones	Namina Forna		Amazing Audiobooks for Young Adults
2022	The Office of Historical Corrections (2020)	Danielle Evans	Joniece Abbott-Pratt, Nicole Lewis, Brittany Pressley, January LaVoy, Adenrele Ojo, and Janina Edwards	Listen List

== Narrations ==
Year	Title	Author	Other Narrator(s)
2018	Algorithms of Oppression: How Search Engines Reinforce Racism (2018)	Safiya Umoja Noble	
2018	How Long 'Til Black Future Month? Stories (2018)	N.K. Jemisin	Gail Nelson-Holgate, Robin Ray Eller, Ron Butler, Kevin Stillwell, Je Nie Fleming, and Jeanette Illidge
2019	It was All A Dream: A New Generation Confronts the Broken Promise to Black America (2019)	Reniqua Allen	
2019	Red at the Bone (2019)	Jacqueline Woodson	Jacqueline Woodson, Quincy Tyler Bernstine, Peter Francis James, and Bahni Turpin
2020	All the Stars and Teeth (2020)	Adalyn Grace	
2020	Antiracist Baby (2020)	Ibram X. Kendi	Guy Lockard
2020	Now That I've Found You (2020)	Kristina Forest	
2020	The Office of Historical Corrections (2020)	Danielle Evans	Joniece Abbott-Pratt, Nicole Lewis, Brittany Pressley, January LaVoy, Adenrele Ojo, and Janina Edwards
2020	Otaku (2020)	Chris Kluwe	
2020	Overground Railroad (2020)	Lesa Cline-Ransome	Shayna Small and Lesa Cline-Ransome (author's note)
2020	Together in a Sudden Strangeness: America's Poets Respond to the Pandemic (2020)	Alice Quinn (editor)	Edoardo Ballerini, Gisela Chípe, Catherine Cohen, Michael Crouch, Catherine Ho, Hillary Huber, Nicole Lewis, Dani Martineck, Prentice Onayemi, Elisabeth Rodgers, and Neil Shah
2020	Trouble the Saints (2020)	Alaya Dawn Johnson	Neil Shah
2020	The Vanishing Half (2020)	Brit Bennett	
2021	Feminist AF: A Guide to Crushing Girlhood (2021)	Brittney Cooper, Chanel Craft Tanner, and Susana Morris	Trei Taylor and Robin Eller
2021	The Gilded Ones (2021)	Namina Forna	
2021	The Kindest Lie (2021)	Nancy Johnson	
2021	Last Stop from Innocence (2021)	Takerra Allen	
2021	Sister in Arms (2021)	Kaia Alderson	
2021	Stella (2021)	Takis Würger with Liesl Schillinger (translator)	Will Damron
2021	We Are Not Like Them (2021)	Christine Pride and Jo Piazza	Marin Ireland, Kevin R. Free, and Chanté McCormick
2022	Ain't Gonna Let Nobody Turn Me 'Round: My Story of the Making of Martin Luther King Day (2022)	Kathlyn J. Kirkwood	
2022	Goliath (2022)	Tochi Onyebuchi	Stephanie Willis, Tim Campbell, Kevin R. Free, Adam Lazarre-White, JD Jackson, Juliana Velez, and Nidra Sous La Terre
2022	Last Summer on State Street (2022)	Toya Wolfe	

== Stage performances ==
=== Off-Broadway ===
- Parable of the Sower (The Public Theater)
- Rags Parkland Sings Songs of the Future (Ars Nova workshop)

=== Regional ===
- Buddy: The Buddy Holly Story (Cincinnati Playhouse)
- The Colored Museum (Huntington Theatre Company)
- The Glorious World of Crowns, Kinks, and Curls (Baltimore Center Stage)
- How to Catch Creation (Baltimore Center Stage & Philadelphia Theatre Company)
- Intimate Apparel (Bay Street Theatre)
- Just Right Just Now (Theater for the New City)
- Closer (Load of Fun Theatre)
- The Oregon Trail (Eugene O'Neill Theater Center)
- Stew (Cincinnati Playhouse) 2023

=== The Juilliard School ===
- Assassins
- Henry IV (Part I)
- The House of Bernarda Alba
- Toya in Hurt Village
- Romeo and Juliet
- The Threepenny Opera
