= Samira Ahmed (author) =

American author

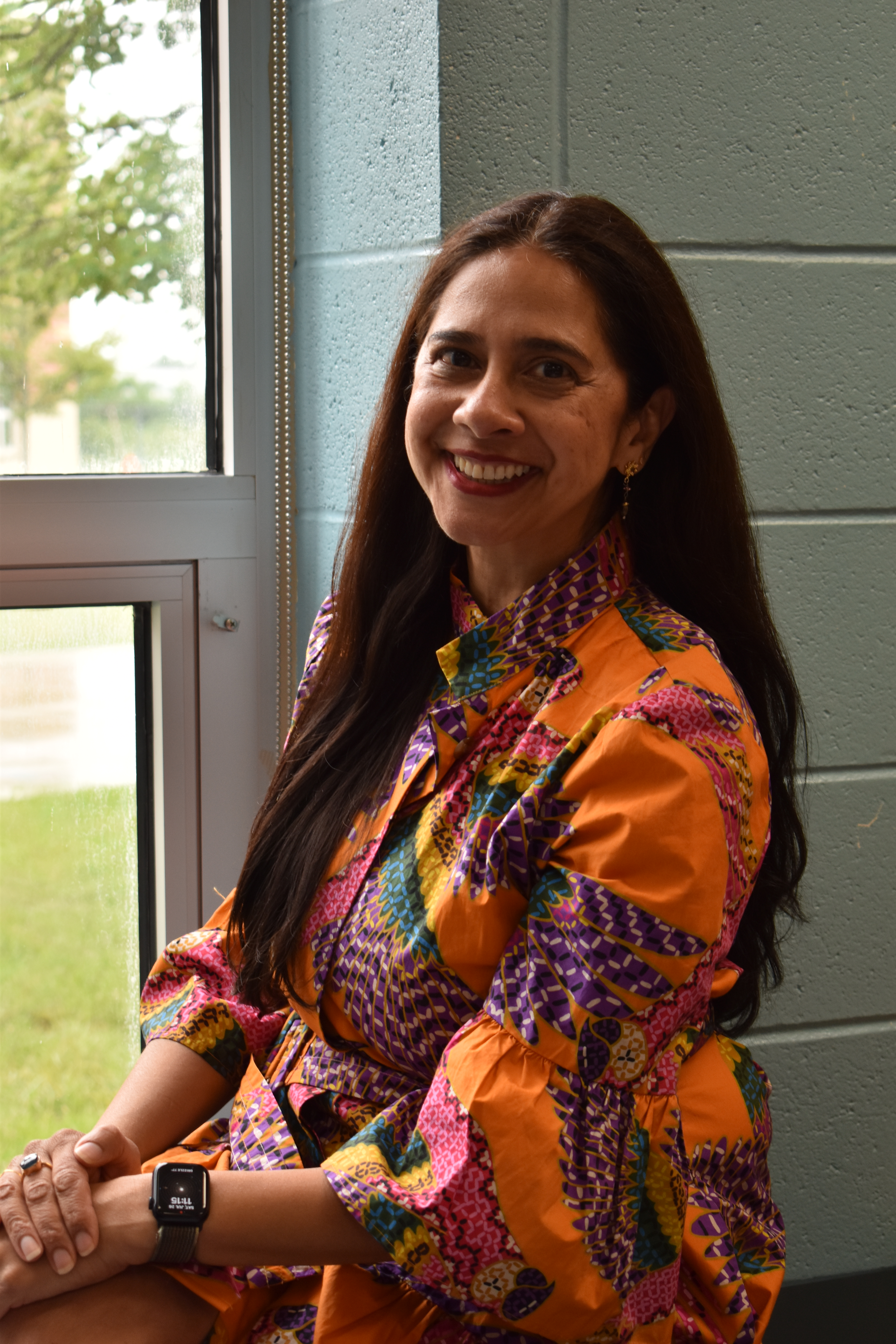
- Ahmed at the YA Midwest festival on July 26, 2025.
- Born: Mumbai, India
- Education: University of Chicago, BA and MAT
- Occupation: Novelist
- Writing career
- Language: English
- Years active: 2016–present
- Genres: Young Adult fiction, poetry, non-fiction
- Notable works: Love, Hate & Other Filters (2018); Internment (2019)
- Website: samiraahmed.com

Samira Ahmed is an American author of young adult fiction, poetry, and non-fiction, best known for her New York Times bestselling novels Love, Hate & Other Filters and Internment.

== Early life ==
Ahmed was born in Mumbai, India, and grew up in Batavia, Illinois. She has a degree from the University of Chicago, taught high school English for seven years, and worked in nonprofit before publishing her first novel in 2018.

== Career ==
Her young adult debut novel Love, Hate & Other Filters, about a Muslim Indian-American teen filmmaker making plans about her future while dealing with islamophobia, debuted at No. 8 on the New York Times Young Adult Hardcover bestseller list and received starred reviews from Booklist, Publishers Weekly, and School Library Journal.

Her 2019 sophomore novel Internment, set in near-future America where Muslims are sent to internment camps following a law enacted by the Islamophobic president, received a starred review from Kirkus Reviews and debuted on the New York Times Young Adult Hardcover bestseller list at #4. Internment has been described as one of the "most politically urgent reads of 2019" by Entertainment Weekly. It has also been optioned for film by Gotham Group and Chariot Entertainment prior to its release.

Ahmed made her comics writing debut with Ms. Marvel: Beyond the Limit; it was illustrated by Andrés Genolet and published by Marvel Comics. The limited series ran for five issues from December 2021 to April 2022. Entertainment Weekly highlighted that "Ms. Marvel comics have only been written by Muslim writers so far [...]. But Samira Ahmed will be the first South Asian female writer to write a Ms. Marvel series". Avery Kaplan, in her review of Ms. Marvel: Beyond the Limit for The Beat, wrote that "Beyond the Limit was a fun and interesting story that went to some unexpected places, all while allowing Kamala plenty of time to shine (and to make a lot of funny food jokes)". The trade paperback collecting the five issues was published in June 2022 – Bleeding Cool commented that this coincides with the premiere of the Ms. Marvel television miniseries.

== Bibliography ==
=== Novels ===
- Love, Hate & Other Filters (Soho Teen, 2018, ISBN 9781616958473).
- Internment (Little, Brown Books for Young Readers, 2019, ISBN 9780316522694).
- Mad, Bad & Dangerous to Know (Soho Teen, 2020, ISBN 9781432884574).
- Hollow Fires (Little, Brown Books for Young Readers, 2022, ISBN 9780316282642).
- This Book Won't Burn (Little, Brown Books for Young Readers, 2024, ISBN 9780316548397)
- The Singular Life of Aria Patel (Little, Brown Books for Young Readers, 2025, ISBN 9780316548687).

=== Comics ===
- Ms. Marvel: Beyond the Limit #1-5 (with Andrés Genolet, limited series, Marvel Comics, 2021–2022).
  - Ms. Marvel: Beyond the Limit (collects #1-5, trade paperback, June 2022, ISBN 978-1-302-91295-6)
- Ms. Marvel: Bottled Up #1 (with Ramon Bachs, one-shot, Marvel Unlimited, 2022)

=== Short stories ===
- "Brains Don't Smell" (Entropy Mag, 2016)
- "Red Thread" (The Fem, 2016)
- Color Outside the Lines (Soho Teen, 2019) (with stories by Adam Silvera, Anna-Marie McLemore, Sangu Mandanna, Elsie Chapman, Caroline Tung Richmond, Kelly Zekas, Tarun Shanker, Eric Smith, Lori M. Lee).
- Take the Mic: Fictional Stories of Everyday Resistance (Arthur A. Levine Books, 2019) (with stories by Jason Reynolds, Sofia Quintero, Yamile Saied Méndez, Bethany C. Morrow).
- Vampires Never Get Old (Imprint, 2020) (with stories by Dhonielle Clayton, Zoraida Córdova, Heidi Heilig, Julie Murphy, Mark Oshiro, Rebecca Roanhorse, Laura Ruby, Victoria Schwab).
- Come On In (Inkyard Press, 2020) (with stories by Adi Alsaid, Zoraida Córdova, Alaya Dawn Johnson, Maurene Goo, Justine Larbalestier, Sona Charaipotra).
- A Universe of Wishes (Crown Books for Young Readers, 2020) (with stories by Dhonielle Clayton, Tara Sim, Natalie C. Parker, Libba Bray, Anna-Marie McLemore, Kwame Mbalia, V. E. Schwab, Rebecca Roanhorse, Nic Stone, Jenni Balch, Mark Oshiro, Samira Ahmed, Tessa Gratton, Zoraida Córdova, Tochi Onyebuchi).

=== Poetry ===
- Low Light (Claudius Speaks, 2016)
- Ink Knows No Borders (Seven Stories, 2019) (with poems by Elizabeth Acevedo, Erika L. Sánchez, Ocean Vuong, Fatimah Asghar, Chen Chen, Ada Limón, Kaveh Akbar, Hala Alyan, Safia Elhillo, and Bao Phi).
