= Sona Charaipotra =

American author and journalist

- Education: BA in Journalism and American Studies, MFA in Creative Writing, Master's in Dramatic Writing and South Asian Diaspora Studies
- Alma mater: The New School, Rutgers University, NYU
- Writing career
- Years active: 2015-present
- Notable work: Tiny Pretty Things
- Website: sonacharaipotra.com

Sona Charaipotra is an American entertainment and lifestyle journalist, screenwriter, and a bestselling author of young adult fiction. She was an editor at People, Parents.com, and other major media, and is best known for her YA lit column on Parade.com and her YA series Tiny Pretty Things.

== Early life ==
Charaipotra is Indian-American, born to two pediatrician parents. Despite family hopes of becoming a doctor, she chose to become a writer. She has two siblings.

Charaipotra attended Rutgers University with a double major in journalism and American studies. She earned a master's degree in dramatic writing and South Asian diaspora studies from NYU in 2006. In 2012, Charaipotra graduated with an MFA from The New School, where she studied creative writing in the Writing for Children program.

Sona Charaipotra has two kids. She is married to the author and professor Navdeep Singh Dhillon, who wrote the YA novel Sunny G's Series of Rash Decisions.

== Career ==
Aside from writing novels, she is a freelance journalist and editor for entertainment sites like The New York Times, Cosmopolitan, Bustle.com, Parade.com, Teen Vogue, Vulture.com, and other US media. Charaipotra made a name as a celebrity journalist for People and an editor at the now defunct TeenPeople. She has also been an editor for parenting publications like WhatToExpect.com and TheBump.com, and was the editor of the Barnes & Noble Teen Blog. She was a senior editor of Parents.com from 2021 to 2024.

In 2011, Charaipotra co-founded CAKE Literary, a "boutique book development company with a decidedly diverse bent", with her Tiny Pretty Things co-author Dhonielle Clayton. The two friends met at The New School at the beginning of their MFA and bonded over a shared feeling that they were unrepresented in children and YA books growing up and wanting to change that. They founded CAKE Literary on the belief that "rich, diversity-infused reads that are still compulsively readable — and very relatable" are possible. The company focuses on developing readable, high concept ideas to middle grade, YA, and women's fiction. In 2021, Clayton relaunched the company as Cake Creative.

Charaipotra was a founding board member of the South Asian Journalists Association and a board member of We Need Diverse Books, a non-profit organization focused on increasing diversity in book publishing.

She is also a working screenwriter, whose projects have been developed by MTV films.

== Selected works ==
Her solo debut, Symptoms of a Heartbreak, was inspired by shows like Doogie Howser, M.D. Charaipotra saw the novel as an opportunity to write a similar story with Indian protagonists. Her 2022 novel How Maya Got Fierce is based on her own experiences working as a woman of color in the New York magazine industry. A Netflix Original TV show based on Charaipotra's series Tiny Pretty Things, was released in October 2020, but cancelled after only one season.

== Bibliography ==
=== Novels ===
- Tiny Pretty Things Series, co-authored with Dhonielle Clayton.
1. Tiny Pretty Things (HarperTeen, 2015)
2. Shiny Broken Pieces (HarperTeen, 2016)
3. The Rumor Game (Disney, 2022)
- Symptoms of a Heartbreak (Macmillan Publishers, Imprint, 2019)
- How Maya Got Fierce (Macmillan Publishers, Imprint, 2022)

=== Anthologies (Editor) ===
- Magic Has No Borders (HarperTeen, 2023)
- Home Has No Borders (HarperTeen, 2025)

=== Short stories ===
- Good Girls Marry Doctors: South Asian American Daughters on Obedience and Rebellion (Aunt Lute Books, 2016)
- "Still Star-Crossed" in A Thousand Beginnings and Endings, edited by Ellen Oh and Elsie Chapman (Greenwillow Books, 2018)
- "Chilled Monkey Brains" in Our Stories, Our Voices: 21 YA Authors Get Real About Injustice, Empowerment, and Growing Up Female in America, edited by Amy Reed (Simon Pulse, 2018)
- "The Trip" in Come on In: 15 Stories about Immigration and Finding Home, edited by Adi Alsaid (Inkyard/Harper, 2020)
- "Let It Spin" in Game On: 15 Stories of Wins, Losses, and Everything In Between, edited by Laura Silverman (Viking Books for Young Readers, 2022)
- "The Collector" in Magic Has No Borders, edited by Sona Charaipotra and Samira Ahmed (HarperTeen, 2023)
