= The Belles =

Young adult novel series by Dhonielle Clayton

- The Belles (2018); The Everlasting Rose (2019); The Beauty Trials (2023)
- Author: Dhonielle Clayton
- Country: United States
- Language: English
- Publisher: Disney-Hyperion (1, 3); Freeform (2)
- Published: February 6, 2018 – February 14, 2023
- No. of books: 3

The Belles is a dystopian young adult novel series by Dhonielle Clayton, consisting of three books: The Belles (2018), The Everlasting Rose (2019) and The Beauty Trials (2023). The first two books are Junior Library Guild selections.

== Reception ==
=== The Belles (2018) ===
The Belles, published February 6, 2018 by Disney-Hyperion, is a New York Times best seller. The book received starred reviews from Kirkus and Booklist, as well as positive reviews from School Library Journal, Horn Book, and Publishers Weekly.

Booklist applauded Clayton's examination of "the price of beauty in a society that reveres it," refusing to "shy away from facing uncomfortable truths in our own society." The Horn Book echoed the sentiment, explaining that "while Clayton’s primary theme is the destructiveness wrought by societally imposed beauty ideals, she also touches upon other systems of exploitation, including slavery, racism and colorism, rape culture, and forced labor."

Booklist also appreciated how Clayton incorporated race throughout the novel, stating that it holds up a mirror to "literature today, ... that fetishizes and commodifies [women of color]."

The audiobook, narrated by Rosie Jones, received a positive review from Booklist, who noted that "Clayton’s exotic world is perfectly matched to narrator Jones’ breathy and silky-smooth voice."

The Chicago Public Library and Kirkus named The Belles one of the best young adult books of the year.

=== The Everlasting Rose (2019) ===
The Everlasting Rose was published March 5, 2019 by Freeform. The book received starred reviews from Kirkus and Booklist, as well as positive reviews from The Horn Book and School Library Journal.

Booklist preferred the sequel to the original book, stating, "Although The Belles is a phenomenal read, this is even more staggering. Clayton seizes the opportunity to expound upon Orléans, rendering a world that is breathtaking and crushing, beautiful and vile, and whimsical and terrifying. She poignantly uses a harrowing, fantastical tale to illuminate the very real horrors of unattainable beauty standards and the enslavement of marginalized bodies. As relevant as it is exquisite." The Horn Book disagreed with the improvement, noting, "This second installment in the series is more repetitively plotted than the first, and particularly overuses a device of an ally dying mere moments after being reunited with Camille."

== Awards and honors ==
The Belles and The Everlasting Rose are a Junior Library Guild books.

The Belles book was a New York Times bestseller. The Chicago Public Library (CPL) and Kirkus Reviews named it one of the best young adult books of 2018. CPL also included it on their list of the best teen book covers of the year.

Awards for The Belles series
Year	Work	Award	Result	Ref.
2018	The Belles	Booklist Editors' Choice: Books for Youth	Selection	
2018	The Belles	Goodreads Choice Award for Young Adult Fantasy & Science Fiction	Nominee	
2019	The Belles	ALA Amazing Audiobooks for Young Adults	Selection	
2019	The Belles	ALA Best Fiction for Young Adults	Selection	
2019	The Belles	Children's & Teen Choice Book Awards	Finalist	
2019	The Belles	Locus Award for Best Young Adult Book	Nominee	
2019	The Belles	Lodestar Award for Best Young Adult Book	Nominee	
2020	The Everlasting Rose	IGNYTE Award for Best Young Adult Novel	Nominee	
