= The Merciless Ones =

2022 young adult novel

- Author: Namina Forna
- Language: English
- Genre: Fantasy
- Publisher: Delacorte Press
- Publication date: June 30, 2022
- Publication place: Sierra Leone/United States
- Pages: 453
- ISBN: 9781474959582

The Merciless Ones is a young adult fantasy novel written by Namina Forna, published in 2022. The story follows Deka, the protagonist who challenges society's strict norms and expectations in a world where women are subjugated. There are themes of empowerment, resilience, and rebellion throughout the narrative, offering readers a thought-provoking exploration of gender roles and societal oppression. The Merciless Ones has often been celebrated for its diverse representation of strong female characters who defy the traditional stereotypes. Forna's work in this novel has sparked critical discussions on topics such as gender equality, empowerment, and the importance of challenging societal norms. This book is the sequel to The Gilded Ones and is a continuation of Forna's "The Deathless Series."
