= The Gilded Ones =

2021 novel by Namina Forna

- First edition
- Author: Namina Forna
- Language: English
- Genre: Fantasy
- Publisher: Delacorte Press
- Publication date: February 9, 2021
- Publication place: Sierra Leone/United States
- Pages: 432
- ISBN: 9781984848697

The Gilded Ones is a 2021 young adult fantasy novel by Sierra Leonean American writer Namina Forna. Forna's debut novel was published on February 9, 2021, and quickly entered the New York Times Best Seller list and Indie Bestseller lists.

== Development ==
Forna stated that as a child she heard stories about strong women, such as Mami Wata, the goddess of water, and the Dahomey Amazons. She also heard stories about African civilization such as the Walls of Benin and Great Zimbabwe told to her by her grandmother and father to distract her from the Sierra Leone civil war. She later found that western literature lacked African characters and black female heroes, and she was driven to change this.

She stated in an interview that she first got the idea when she had a recurring dream of a girl in a golden armor walking in a field while she was still an undergraduate at Spelman College before writing the novel years later using elements of West African mythology and Sierra Leonean culture.

The book is the first in a trilogy called The Gilded Ones series, originally titled the Deathless series before publication. It was acquired by Delacorte Press, an imprint of Random House Children's Books, in a six-figure deal after several rejections from publishers. The second book in the series is titled The Merciless Ones, and the third and final book is titled The Eternal Ones.

== Plot ==
The novel takes place in the West Africa-inspired kingdom of Otera, where 16-year-old Deka lives in the village of Irfut with her ailing father, following her mother's recent death from a redpox infection. Deka is consumed with fear and anxiety due to the upcoming Ritual of Purity, a compulsory ceremony for 16-year-old girls that exiles those who bleed gold instead of red. During the ceremony, deathshrieks — monsters whose screams can kill — attack. Deka manages to drive them away with her voice alone. Although the town believes she has been killed, Deka's worst fears are realized when she discovers she is bleeding cursed gold and is declared impure. She is imprisoned in a dungeon where she is tortured and killed repeatedly, only to wake up alive each time. Eventually, a mysterious woman named White Hands offers her a chance to join the capital's army of Alaki — impure girls like herself, descendants of demons called the Gilded Ones, who are trained to fight deathshrieks for the Emperor. Deka accepts the offer and, along with a girl named Britta, joins the army.

Deka is taken to the Oteran capital city of Hemaira, to a training ground called the Warthu Bera. There, she is introduced to her fellow alaki Belcalis, Gazal, Jeneba, twins Asha and Adwapa, and Mehrut, as well as their uruni, or male counterparts, including Keita, Li, and Lamin. Deka, Britta, and the others train under their teachers, Karmoko Thandiwe, Karmoko Huon, and Karmoko Calderis, and Deka also receives special training in the use of her ability to command deathshrieks. Deka emerges as a sort of leader of all the alaki in the Warthu Bera. Deka and the others are sent on raids to kill deathshrieks as part of their training. During one such raid, Deka discovers a shapeshifting creature named Ixa, who bonds with her and serves as her mount. She and the other alaki also discover temples of the Gilded Ones, depicting them as four benevolent gods instead of four demons. On later raids, Deka uses her ability to command deathshrieks to enable the rest of her team to kill them easily, earning the nickname "Death Strikers." On yet another raid with the Death Strikers, Deka discovers she can understand Deathshrieks, and that they keep referring to her as Nuru. She also discovers that she can command not only deathshrieks but alaki as well, coming to the conclusion that the two are one and the same creature.

The team sets out with the emperor and the entire army of Hemaira to exterminate the deathshrieks. Deka saves Britta from dying her final death, and later, when trying to save her friend Katya who is resurrected as a Deathshriek, is executed. Since Deka cannot truly die from being dismembered, Keita puts a poultice on her that causes her to appear to truly die. Deka is then told of the true nature of the Gilded Ones - who are gods, not demons - by White Hands, who reveals herself to be Fatu the Relentless, the first alaki, but continues to go by the name White Hands. Deka spends a few days healing, and then leads the army of deathshrieks down to fight the Hemairan army. While the fighting is going on, Deka goes to the temple of the Gilded Ones and finds Emperor Gezo and a team of soldiers guarding it. Deka's team, along with Ixa, begin fighting the soldiers, while Deka takes on Emperor Gezo. Gezo reveals himself to be a true jatu, a male descendant of the Gilded Ones. While jatu cannot resurrect like alaki can, they are faster and stronger even than the alaki. However, Deka's training under the Karmokos at the Warthu Bera allows her to triumph over the emperor, who is captured and imprisoned. Deka then frees the Gilded Ones - Hui Li, Beda, Anok, and Etzli. Deka and White Hands, along with the rest of Deka's team, take their place at the head of the army of the Gilded Ones, promising to free all the women of Otera and create a truly equal society.

== Reception ==
The novel received several positive reactions from literary critics. it entered the New York Times and Indie bestseller lists. A review from Publishers Weekly said of the novel: "Abundant action drives the pace, while a nuanced plot advocates social change by illustrating the myriad ways in which society cages and commodifies women." The Guardian's review of the book states: "Action combines with an intense feminist story of sisterhood, where strength is found in female friendships and alliances." Another review from Tor.com praised the lead character stating that "in Deka, Forna offers a driven and determined main character who wades through intense trauma and violence and comes out the other side fueled with righteous fury".

== Film adaptation ==
A week after the release of the novel, Deadline Hollywood announced that it had been optioned for a film adaptation by the independent film production company Makeready. It will be produced by Brad Weston, Negin Salmasi and Misha Green, the latter of whom is known for her work on Lovecraft Country. Forna has also signed to write the script for the film adaptation.
