= Glory Edim =

American writer

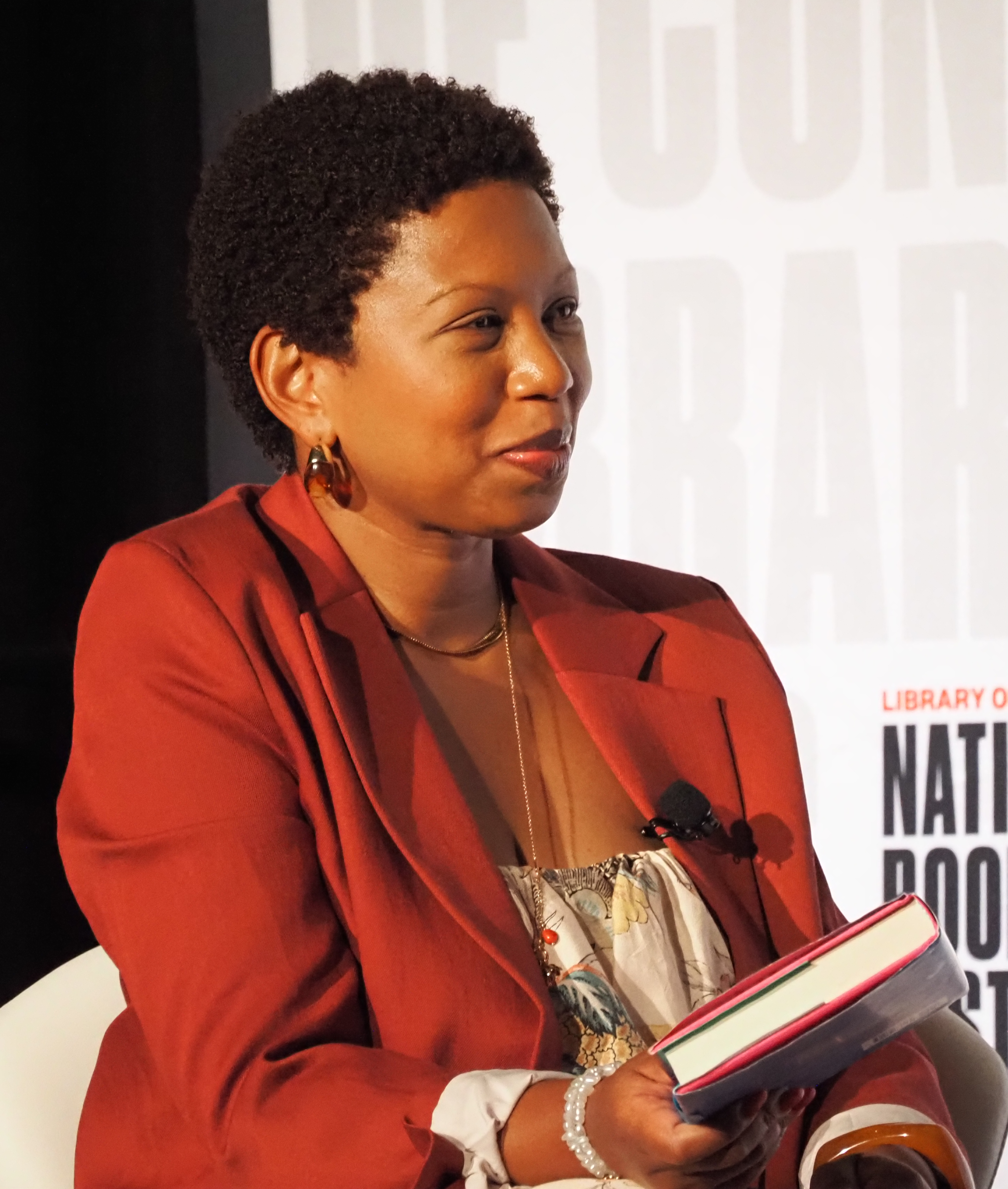
- Born: 1982 (age 43–44); Arlington, VA, United States
- Education: Howard University (BA)
- Occupations: Writer, Influencer
- Children: 1
- Writing career
- Language: English
- Notable awards: Innovator’s Award, Los Angeles Times (2017)

Glory Okon Edim is a Nigerian-American writer and entrepreneur. She is best known as the founder of the reading network Well-Read Black Girl. Edim received the 2017 Innovator's Award at the Los Angeles Times Book Prize for her work.

== Early life and education ==
Edim was born and raised in Arlington, Virginia, to Nigerian immigrant parents who had survived the Biafra war. Edim's father moved back to Nigeria in the early 90s; when she was in kindergarten, she and her mother joined him. The two soon returned to the States after Edim fell ill. Her mother, previously a historian, pursued a nursing degree. They frequently visited her father in Nigeria.

Edim attended Trinity College on a full scholarship before transferring to Howard University, her father's alma mater, where she studied journalism.

== Career ==
Edim launched Well-Read Black Girl (WRBG) on Instagram after moving to New York City in 2015. An avid reader, the Well-Read Black Girl moniker came from a nickname that her boyfriend gave her and printed on a t-shirt for her as a gift. Edim was frequently asked about the shirt by strangers on the subway, which often turned into conversations about what she was reading at the time.

Each Instagram post featured an archival photo of an African American woman writer with a caption that featured a quotation by that writer. Eden stated that her goal for WRBG was to develop a community for Black women to discuss their interest in literature by Black women writers. The commenters (mostly Black women) began conversations in the comments, which prompted Edim to launch a Brooklyn-based book club for WRBG. Authors such as Naomi Jackson and LaShonda Katrice Barnett attended the meetings upon her invitation.

Edim developed the idea for an annual literary festival of the same name with the help of writer Tayari Jones. In June 2017 Edim used Kickstarter, where she worked full-time, to raise $40,000 for the event. The inaugural festival took place in September 2017 in Brooklyn and sold out.

=== Books ===
She published an anthology called Well-Read Black Girl: Finding Our Stories, Discovering Ourselves (Ballantine Books) on October 30, 2018. Edim studied anthologies by Toni Cade Bambara to inform the style of the anthology. The book includes authors at various stages in their careers, such as Morgan Jerkins, Jacqueline Woodson, and Jesmyn Ward. Edim wrote the foreword. Of putting together the anthology, Edim stated "I was trying to replicate the intimacy you have in a book club within the community, where it feels like someone is sitting next to you and telling you a very personal and loving story." The anthology received positive critical reception. Utibe Gautt Ate wrote in a review for LA Review of Books, "The anthology’s premise, “When did you first see yourself in literature?” is a seemingly simple question each author is asked to illuminate, yet for the black women here it opens a glorious Pandora’s box and sparks a telling journey of how black girl readers become black woman writers." Publishers Weekly stated, "Speaking directly to black women readers, this book contains a journey from which anyone can derive enjoyment and benefit."

- Well-Read Black Girl: Finding Our Stories, Discovering Ourselves (Ballantine Books, 2018) ISBN 978-0525619772
- On Girlhood: 15 Stories from the Well-Read Black Girl Library (Liveright, 2021) ISBN 978-1631497698
- Gather Me: A Memoir in Praise of the Books That Saved Me (Ballantine Books, 2024) ISBN 978-0525619796

== Accolades ==
- Innovator's Award, Los Angeles Times (2017)
- Hurston/Wright Merit Award, Hurston/Wright Foundation (2019)
- Outstanding Literary Work – Instructional (Nominee), NAACP Image Awards (2019)
