= Cinderella is Dead =

2020 book by Kalynn Bayron

- Author: Kalynn Bayron
- Cover artist: Manzi Jackson
- Language: English
- Genre: Young adult fiction
- Publisher: Bloomsbury YA
- Publication date: July 7, 2020
- Pages: 400
- ISBN: 978-1-547-60387-9
- OCLC: 1130358790

Cinderella is Dead is a 2020 young adult book by Kalynn Bayron. The novel is focused on Sophia Grimmins, a queer teenager living in the same world as Cinderella, 200 years after her death. Young women that are coming of age are forced to attend balls to be chosen as wives of men they've never met.

== Plot summary ==
The plot holds parallels to the original story of Cinderella. The King of Mersailles holds an annual ball that young women are required to attend. At the ball, men choose the young woman that they want as their bride. A woman has three years to be chosen as a bride. If not, she forfeits her right to get married and loses her connections to her community. Even if they do get married, some end up in bad marriages and some would rather not get married at all.

The main character, Sophia, wants to live with and marry her childhood best friend, Erin, who she is in love with. For Sophia and Erin to live like this, they will need to escape Mersailles. Sophia is sure that this is what she wants, but Erin is not sure she wants to escape. Instead, Sophia is befriended by Constance (a descendant of the stepsisters in the original story). Constance recounts the history of Cinderella from her perspective—one that is very different from how the fairy tale is usually told. Sophia and Constance join forces to visit the fairy godmother and to confront the King Manford, hoping to change these patriarchal laws for good.

== Characters ==
Sophia Grimmins: Sophia is the sixteen-year-old protagonist of the novel. She's a queer person of color who wants to live with Erin, a girl she wishes to marry. She is brave, smart, sassy, and strong. Sophia fights for what she wants, even when it means standing up against years of tradition.

Constance: Constance is a descendant of one of the original stepsisters. She is determined and strong-willed, and she tells a different story to Sophia about Cinderella than the one that everyone else has heard.

Erin: Childhood best friend of Sophia, and the girl that Sophia wishes to marry, even if that means fleeing from Mersailles; however, Erin is not so sure she is willing to give up the life that she has.

Amina: the Fairy Godmother of the original story. She is portrayed as more of a witch, having a variety of powers including potion making and divination. Sophia and Constance go to her for help. She has either had people come to her for help or to accuse her of evil throughout the years. She uses potions to remain looking young, though she does age.

Luke Langley: Luke is a side character who is gay, and has a past relationship with a boy named Louis. When he was found out, his sister was the only reason that he didn't get imprisoned, as she convinced people that Luke was only going through a phase. He wants to marry Sophia as a way to hide both of their sexualities.

Liv Preston: Liv is a seventeen-year-old friend of Sophia's who goes to the ball a third time.

King Manford: King of Marsailles. Cunning and cruel. Upholds the laws that Sophia and Constance are fighting against.

Cinderella: The original girl that the story has been told about. She has been dead for two centuries when this book takes place.

== Reception ==
Melanie Kirkwood, for The Booklist, calls the novel a "fast-paced read" and says that Bayron's take on the Cinderella tale "will forever change how readers perceive fairy tales." Kirkwood also commented on the main character construed by the author, saying her courage and skill "alongside her stereotype-shattering Black girl beauty will have readers rooting for her." Kirkus Reviews called it a "promising debut" and praised the setting chosen by the author, also saying that "the twists and turns will keep readers in suspense."

In a review for The National of Scotland, McLaughlin called the book "the perfect mix" of a dystopian world and a new take on a classic fairy tale. Writing for The School Librarian, Sammie Boon criticizes the presence of some plot holes in the story, as well as the "ending which felt a bit too neat". Both Boon and McLaughlin called attention to the importance of the subjects tackled by Bayron.

In 2020 and 2022, the novel was recognized through awards and nominations. In 2020, the novel gained recognition as the Wordery Children's Book of the Year Winner; the Books Are My Bag Winner under the Young Adult Fiction category; and the Book Shimmy Award Winner under the We Need Diverse Books category. The same year, the novel was nominated for the CYBILS Award. In 2022, Cinderella is Dead won YALSA's 2022 Amazing Audiobooks for Young Adults.

In 2022, Cinderella is Dead was involved in a number of censorship challenges in schools throughout the United States, including but not limited to Granbury, Texas, and San Antonio, Texas. In Granbury, the title was included on a list of 134 books that have been challenged by the independent school district and consequently removed by the committee. In San Antonio, the title was removed alongside a list of over 400 books after Rep. Matt Krause published a list of books that he deemed would cause students "discomfort" for addressing sexuality and race. In response to the book's negative reception, Bayron commented, "My biggest fear is that these young readers are going to be denied access to stories about people who look like them, who love like them. They're who I write for. That's my job. That's who I create these stories for, and knowing that they're being kept from them is very disheartening." The book continues to be targeted, and in 2026, was one of at least 21 young adult titles in Indiana to be targeted for removal.
