= Nightcrawling =

2022 novel by Leila Mottley

- First edition cover of Nightcrawling
- Author: Leila Mottley
- Publisher: Alfred A. Knopf
- Publication date: June 7, 2022
- Pages: 277
- ISBN: 978-0-593-31893-5

Nightcrawling is a 2022 novel by Leila Mottley. Along with other honors, the novel was longlisted for the 2022 Booker Prize, making Mottley the youngest author to have been nominated for the award.

== Reception ==
=== Reviews ===
Nightcrawling was generally well-received by critics, including starred reviews from Booklist, Kirkus Reviews, Library Journal, and Publishers Weekly.

Booklist's Courtney Eathorne called the book's main character, Kiara, 'an unforgettable dynamo," stating that "her story brings critical human depth to conversations about police sexual violence."

Kirkus Reviews highlighted Mottley's writing, stating, "the real story here is lush, immersive writing and a relentless reality that crushes a girl’s soul."

Publishers Weekly noted how "scenes of realism are rendered with a poet’s eye" and concluded, "This heartrending story makes for a powerful testament to a Black woman’s resilience."

Luke Gorham, writing for Library Journal, wrote that Nightcrawling is "undeniably bleak but littered with small beauties and a powerful discourse on the dehumanizing effects policing can have on marginalized communities, bodies, and minds (and especially on Black women)." He concluded by stating, 'Mottley’s novel understands that sometimes a happy ending just means surviving."

In selecting the novel for Oprah's Book Club, Oprah Winfrey "said she was struck by Mottley's power to convey, in vivid and precise language, trauma, love, and everything in between," saying, "It always brings me joy to help introduce new writers to the reading community, and this young poet wowed me with her ode and elegy to Oakland, and her acute and insightful depictions of youth, injustice, the legacy of incarceration, and the resilience of community and chosen family."

=== Awards and honors ===
Nightcrawling was an Oprah's Book Club pick in June 2022, and AudioFile included it on their list of the best audiobooks of 2022.

Year	Award	Result	Ref.
2022	Booker Prize	Longlist	
2022	Booklist Editors' Choice: Adult Books for Young Adults	Selection	
2022	Goodreads Choice Award for Best Fiction	Nominee	
2022	Goodreads Choice Award for Best Debut Novel	Nominee	
2022	Grand Prix de Littérature Américaine	Finalist	
2023	Audie Award for Best Female Narrator	Finalist	
2023	Hurston/Wright Legacy Award	Nominee	
2023	Lambda Literary Award for Lesbian Fiction	Finalist	
