= Monica West =

American fiction writer

- Education: Duke University, New York University, University of Iowa
- Writing career
- Genre: Fiction
- Website: monicawestwrites.com

Monica West is an American writer. She is the author of the novel Revival Season, a Barnes & Noble Discover Pick and a finalist for the 2022 Virginia Commonwealth University Cabell First Novelist Award.

== Education ==
West attended Duke University and New York University. She graduated with an M.F.A in fiction from the Iowa Writers' Workshop.

== Literary career ==
West's debut full-length novel, Revival Season, was published by Simon & Schuster in 2021. It follows a Baptist family as it preaches across the American South. The book was inspired by the novels of Toni Morrison, James Baldwin's Go Tell It on the Mountain, Brit Bennett’s The Mothers and Barbara Kingsolver’s The Poisonwood Bible, as well as racism in American churches.

Publishers Weekly called Revival Season "explosive" and "essential reading", and The Washington Post, which called it "spellbinding" and West "an author to watch." The New York Times Book Review noted that "West creates a vivid, intimate world on the page, dramatizing the compromises evangelical women must make." For Washington Independent Review of Books, it is "a novel so profoundly well written that it fills a hole readers didn’t even know existed in the canon." Kirkus Reviews wrote: "West gives us a glimpse of an insular world, but it’s not much more than a glimpse." Ploughshares compared the novel to Chimamanda Ngozi Adichie's Purple Hibiscus. Booklist wrote:

"West’s debut is a bold insight into traditional southern Christianity and its contradictions to contemporary perspectives on gender equality. She writes with a melodic cadence that is honest and often heartbreaking. Her characters are three-dimensional people who tug at readers’ emotions."

== Bibliography ==
- Revival Season (Simon & Schuster, 2021)
