= Namina Forna =

Sierra Leonean American screenwriter and writer

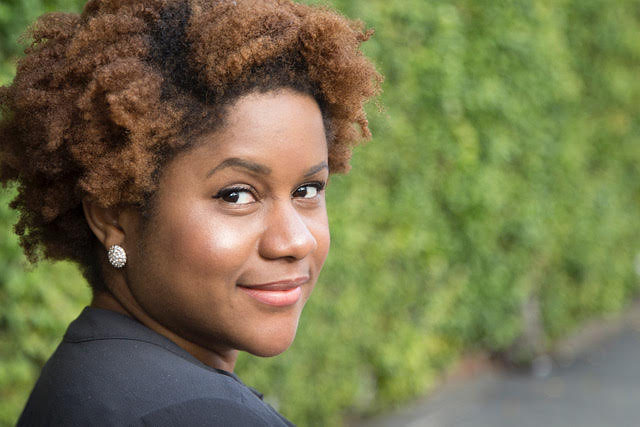
- Born: 9 January 1987 (age 39); Freetown, Sierra Leone
- Education: Spelman College (BA); USC School of Cinematic Arts (MFA)
- Occupations: Author, screenwriter
- Writing career
- Genres: Young adult, fantasy
- Notable work: The Gilded Ones
- Website: naminaforna.com

Namina Forna (born 9 January 1987) is a Sierra Leonean American author of young adult fiction and a screenwriter. Her debut novel The Gilded Ones was published in February 2021 and quickly entered the New York Times and Indie Bestseller lists.

== Early life ==
Namina Forna was born and grew up in Freetown, the capital of Sierra Leone. After her parents divorced, Forna's mother moved to Atlanta, Georgia. However, due to the looming civil war and general political instability in Sierra Leone, her father decided to also send his nine-year-old daughter to live with her mother in the United States.

Forna loved reading as a child. In an interview with Elle, she explained that reading was her way of escaping the atrocities of the civil war.

In Atlanta, she attended Spelman College, a private historically black women's liberal arts college, where she spent time as a student of Nawal El Saadawi who would provide inspiration for The Gilded Ones, Forna's pioneering feminist fantasy novel. After obtaining her Bachelor of Arts degree at Spelman, Forna moved to Los Angeles, California, where she attended the USC School of Cinematic Arts, from which she earned a Master of Fine Arts degree in film and TV production.

== Career ==
Writing in The Guardian in 2021, Forna said that her father and grandmother were the ones to inspire her to become an author. As a child, she heard them tell stories about strong women, such as Mami Wata, the goddess of water, and the Dahomey Amazons. She later found that western literature lacked black female heroes, and she was driven to change this.

Forna became the first Sierra Leonean American to land a book deal with a major publisher for a young adult fantasy novel. A week after the 2021 release of The Gilded Ones, it was announced in Deadline Hollywood that the independent film production company Makeready had signed Forna to write the script for a film adaptation.

=== The Gilded Ones ===
The Gilded Ones was released in February 2021 by Delacorte Press, an imprint of Random House Children's Books. Among the positive critical attention received by The Gilded Ones, published in 2021, a review in Publishers Weekly noted: "Formidable heroines and a thoughtful feminist mythology distinguish debut author Forna's West Africa-inspired fantasy trilogy launch. Abundant action drives the pace, while a nuanced plot advocates social change by illustrating the myriad ways in which society cages and commodifies women." Kirkus Reviews writes that Forna has a compelling "ability to capture feelings tugging on the consciences of many, telling them they are unworthy of life, liberty, and unconditional love because of who they are." The Gilded Ones spent time on both the New York Times Best Seller list and Indie Bestseller lists.

=== The Merciless Ones ===
The Merciless Ones was released in May 2022 and is the second novel in The Deathless Series. Kirkus Reviews writes that The Merciless Ones is "a well-developed and fast-paced sequel." A review by the School Library Journal highlights the topics approached in this sequel including "misogyny, patriarchal oppression, racism, colorism, prejudice, homophobia, and the gender binary." The Merciless Ones appeared on the New York Times Best Seller list.

=== The Eternal Ones ===
The Eternal Ones was released on February 13, 2024 and is the third novel in the Deathless Series. After Deka's family betrays her, she goes on the hunt. For Deka to kill the gods, Deka must unlock the secrets of her divinity. But she doesn't have much time left to save the empire and herself. Her physical body has severely weakened and she must act fast! Throughout Deka's journey, she must uncover the key to her past. However, decisions can have devastating consequences. Will she choose to be reincarnated as a god and lose her loved ones in the process? Or will she conquer the end of the world?

== Personal life ==
Namina Forna is daughter of the Honorable A. G. Sembu Forna, a noted Sierra Leonean politician, and her mother is Ambassador and former Sierra Leone deputy minister of foreign affairs, Ebun Strasser-King.

== Bibliography ==
=== The Deathless series ===
- The Gilded Ones (9 February 2021), ISBN 978-1-984-84869-7
- The Merciless Ones (31 May 2022), ISBN 978-1-984-84872-7
- The Eternal Ones (13 February 2024), ISBN 978-1-984-84875-8
