= Leila Mottley =

American novelist and poet

- Born: 2002 (age 23–24); Oakland, California, U.S.
- Education: Smith College
- Writing career
- Notable work: Nightcrawling

Leila Mottley (born 2002) is an American novelist and poet. She is The New York Times bestselling author of Nightcrawling, which was a nominated for numerous awards, including the Booker Prize, making her the youngest author to have been nominated for the award. In 2018, at age 16, she was named the Youth Poet Laureate of Oakland, California.

== Early life ==
Mottley was born and raised in Oakland, California, where she continues to reside. She began attending Smith College in 2019 and is on indefinite leave to pursue writing. She is Black.

== Career ==
Mottley was named the Youth Poet Laureate of Oakland, California, in 2018 at age 16, having served the prior year as Vice Youth Poet Laureate. Her poetry has appeared in The New York Times.

Mottley co-wrote and starred in a documentary short, When I Write It, an official selection of the Tribeca Film Festival in 2020.

In June 2022, Mottley published her first novel, Nightcrawling, which she began writing at age 16. She wrote the original version during the summer of 2019, shortly after completing her high school education. At the time, she was employed as a substitute preschool teacher.

In 2024, Leila Mottley published her first poetry collection, woke up no light. In 2025, her second novel, The Girls Who Grew Big, was published, in part inspired by her work as a doula.

== Awards and honors ==
In 2018, at the age of 16, Mottley was named the Youth Poet Laureate of Oakland, California, having served the prior year as Vice Youth Poet Laureate.

Her debut novel, Nightcrawling, was a New York Times Best Seller and an Oprah's Book Club pick in June 2022. AudioFile included it on their list of the best audiobooks of 2022.

Awards for Mottley's writing
Year	Title	Award	Categ	Result	Ref.
2022	Nightcrawling	Booker Prize	—	Longlist	
2022	Nightcrawling	Booklist Editors' Choice	Adult Books for Young Adults	Selection	
2022	Nightcrawling	Goodreads Choice Award	Fiction	Nominee	
2022	Nightcrawling	Goodreads Choice Award	Debut Novel	Nominee	
2023	Nightcrawling	Audie Award	Female Narrator	Finalist	
2023	Nightcrawling	Hurston/Wright Legacy Award	Debut Fiction	Nominee	
2023	Nightcrawling	Lambda Literary Award	Lesbian Fiction	Finalist	
2023	Nightcrawling	PEN Oakland awards	Josephine Miles Award	Winner	

== Selected publications ==
- Nightcrawling (2022)
- woke up no light (2024)
- The Girls Who Grew Big (2025)
