= Davina Porter =

British audiobook narrator

- Born: England
- Occupation(s): Audiobook narrator and actor
- Years active: 1986–present
- Spouse: Fergus Porter

Davina Porter is a British audiobook narrator and actor, best known for narrating the unabridged audiobooks of the Outlander series of novels by Diana Gabaldon. Since the 1960s she has been based in the United States, and she began narrating books on tape in the mid-1980s.

== Life and career ==
Porter was born in England, to an English father and a Scottish mother. She moved to the United States in the early 1960s, where she began acting in community theatre and began acting professionally in the mid-1980s. As of 2018 she was based in Westport, Connecticut, and recorded her works at a studio in Katonah.

Porter began narrating audiobooks in 1986. In addition to her work on the Outlander series, she has narrated books by Leo Tolstoy, Daniel Defoe, Alexander McCall Smith and Anne Perry, and narrates both children's and adult literature. In 1989 her recording of Madame Bovary was described in the Los Angeles Times as "a performance against which all others must be measured". In 2019 she had narrated 192 books available on the Audible service. She has also acted in and directed a number of stage productions.

In 2004 Porter won the Audie Award for Faith-Based Fiction and Nonfiction for her narration of Treasure of Stonewycke by Michael Phillips and Judith Pella. In 2006 she won the Audie Award for Best Female Narrator for her narration of A Breath of Snow and Ashes, the sixth book in the Outlander series. In 2015 she won the Sova Award for Best Female Narrator for Written in My Own Heart's Blood, the eighth book in the series.

In 2017 Porter was selected as one of the 20 inaugural members of the Narrator Hall of Fame by Audible. Audible said of Porter's selection that she "has developed a special relationship with the listener, making every audiobook she performs a transporting experience".

Porter has said it takes her a week to two and a half weeks to record a book, depending on length, working five hours a day.
