= Ashley Woodfolk =

American writer for young adults

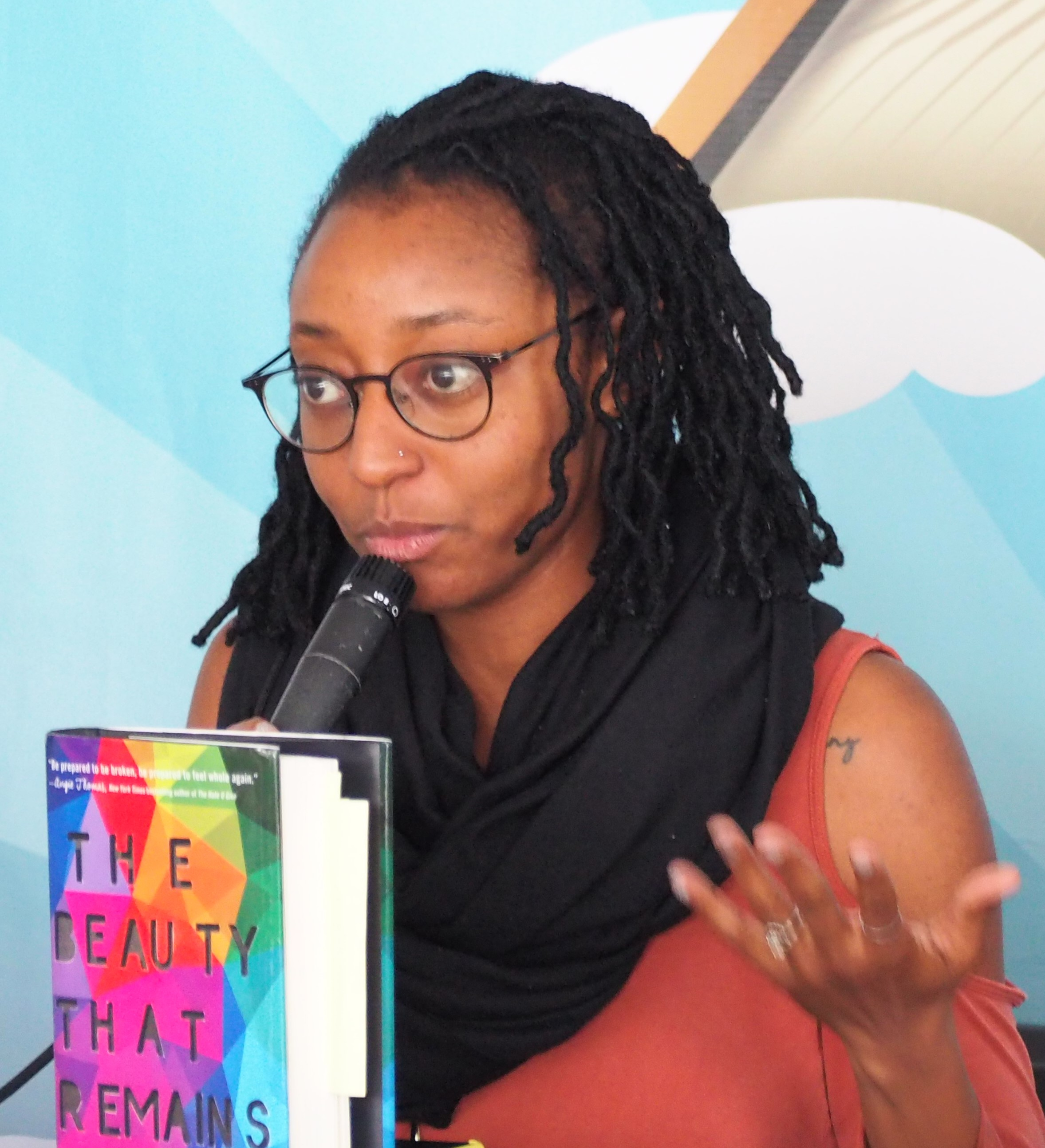
- Woodfolk in 2018
- Born: United States
- Education: Rutgers University
- Occupation: Writer
- Children: 1
- Writing career
- Language: English
- Notable work: The Beauty That Remains (2018)
- Website: www.ashleywoodfolk.com

Ashley Woodfolk is an American writer. She is the author of the young adult books The Beauty That Remains (2018) and When You Were Everything (2020).

== Career ==
Working full-time in marketing for a children's book publisher, Woodfolk wrote her first published book, The Beauty That Remains, on the weekends and in the evenings. The book centers on three teenagers who "find courage and comfort in the aftermath of a tragic loss." It was released on March 6, 2018, and published by Penguin Random House. She used her own issues with anxiety and experiencing using music as a therapeutic tool to inform the events of the book. The book received positive critical reception. In a starred review, School Library Journal wrote, "In her debut, Woodfolk has written a lovely and introspective coming-of-age novel that fully captures the way friendship, music, family, and romance dovetail to create a young person's identity."

Woodfolk's second YA book, When You Were Everything, was released on March 10, 2020, by Delacorte. It focuses on the dissolution of a friendship. When You Were Everything received a starred review from Publishers Weekly. In a review by Kirkus, it was described: "...Woodfolk's novel seamlessly interweaves alternating timelines while making Shakespeare relevant to teens. The author skillfully voices the pain of unexpectedly losing a close friend and explores the choice to remain open despite the risk of future heartache."

She released the first installment in the Flyy Girls series on September 1, 2020, called Lux: The New Girl.

Alongside Dhonielle Clayton, Tiffany D. Jackson, Nic Stone, Angie Thomas, and Nicola Yoon, Woodfolk authored Blackout. The book, set to release in June 2021, follows six interlinked stories about Black teen love during a power outage in New York City.

== Personal life ==
Woodfolk is married. She has one son (b. 2019). She received her bachelor's degree from Rutgers University.

== Works ==
- The Beauty That Remains, 2018, United States, Penguin Random House ISBN 978-1-5247-1587-8, 6 March 2018
- When You Were Everything, 2020, United States, Delacorte ISBN 978-1-5247-1591-5, 10 March 2020
- Lux: The New Girl, 2020, United States, Penguin ISBN 9780593096024, 1 September 2020
