= Adi Alsaid =

Mexican writer

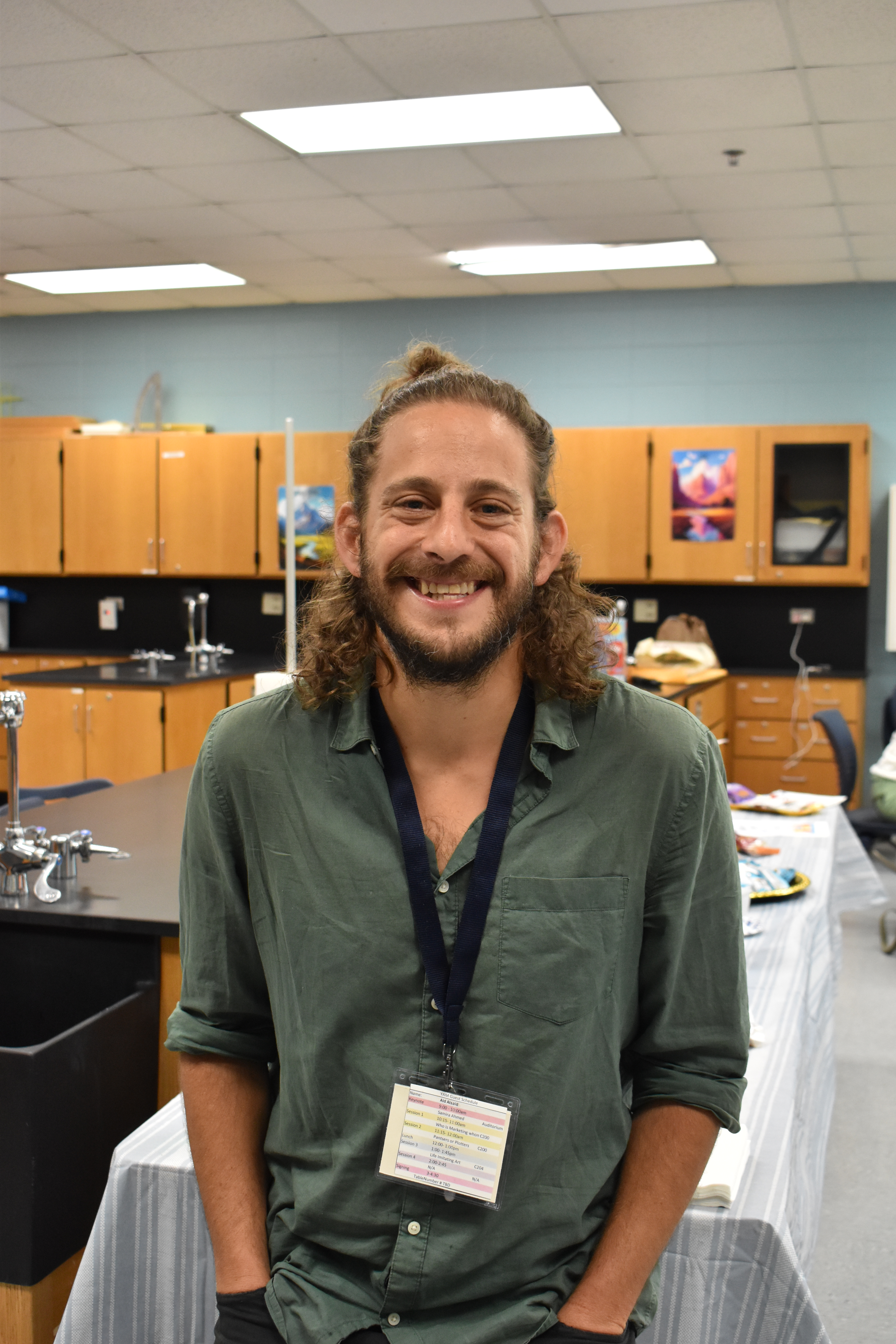
- Alsaid at the YA Midwest festival on July 26, 2025
- Born: June 30, 1987 (age 39); Mexico City, Mexico
- Education: University of Nevada, Las Vegas
- Occupation: Writer
- Writing career
- Genre: Young adult fiction
- Website: http://adialsaid.tumblr.com/

Adi Alsaid (born June 30, 1987) is a Mexican-born author of young adult fiction. His debut novel, Let's Get Lost, was a YALSA Teens' Top Ten Nominee in 2015. His second stand-alone novel, Never Always Sometimes, was nominated as a Kirkus Reviews Best Books of 2015.

== Biography ==
Adi Alsaid is a Mexican-born author of young adult fiction, best known for Let's Get Lost and Never Always Sometimes. Born and raised in Mexico City to Israeli parents, Alsaid attended the University of Nevada, Las Vegas, where he studied marketing. After graduating he spent time in Monterey, California before returning to his hometown. He now lives in Chicago with his wife and two cats.

== Works ==
- Let's Get Lost (July 29, 2014, Harlequin Teen)
- Never Always Sometimes (August 4, 2015, Harlequin Teen)
- North of Happy (April 25, 2017, Harlequin Teen)
- Brief Chronicle of Another Stupid Heartbreak (April, 2019)
- We Didn't Ask for This (April, 2020)
- Come On In (editor; October, 2020)
- Before Takeoff (June, 2022)
- Actually Super (August, 2023)
- The Bravest Warrior in Nefaria (September, 2023)
- The Greatest Heist in Joviala (November, 2024)

Alsaid's debut novel, Let's Get Lost, was a YALSA Teens' Top Ten Nominee in 2015. Lauded by Publishers Weekly, Booklist, Entertainment Weekly, and The Horn Book Magazine, Let's Get Lost has been called "entertaining and romantic" (Kirkus Reviews) and "an impressive novel by a rising star with effortless style and voice" (RT Book Reviews).School Library Journal writes that "reminiscent of John Green's Paper Towns, Alsaid's debut is a gem."

Alsaid's second novel, Never Always Sometimes, has been positively reviewed by publications including Publishers Weekly, School Library Journal, RT Book Reviews, and Common Sense Media. Booklist praises its "clever banter" and "pitch-perfect emotional resonance," affirming that "with all the fun of a classic teen movie, this one should fly off the shelves." In a starred review, Kirkus Reviews writes that "Alsaid cracks the teen-lit trope of friends becoming lovers wide open, exposing a beautiful truth inside. He also perfectly captures the golden glow of senioritis, a period when teens are bored and excited and wistful and nostalgic all at once. Everything is possible in this handful of weeks, including making up for squandered time."
