= Blackout (young adult novel) =

2021 novel

- Authors: Dhonielle Clayton; Tiffany D. Jackson; Nic Stone; Angie Thomas; Ashley Woodfolk; Nicola Yoon
- Language: English
- Publisher: Quill Tree Books
- Publication date: June 22, 2021
- Publication place: United States
- Pages: 256
- ISBN: 978-0063088092

Blackout is a young adult novel written by Dhonielle Clayton, Tiffany D. Jackson, Nic Stone, Angie Thomas, Ashley Woodfolk, and Nicola Yoon. The book contains six interlinked stories about Black teen love during a power outage in New York City. The book was released on June 22, 2021.

== Development and publication ==
Dhonielle Clayton is credited with the initial idea for the book. The authors expressed their desire to write a book about Black love and joy rather than about police brutality. The book was announced via Twitter in November 2020. Clayton described the novel as "our love letter to love, to New York City, and to Black teens. Our reminder to them that their stories, their joy, their love are valid and worthy of being spotlighted." Thomas also described the novel as a love letter to Black teens.

The North American rights to the book were secured by HarperCollins after a twelve-way auction. The novel was also acquired by Egmont in the U.K. for six figures.

== Plot ==
Blackout follows thirteen teenagers in six interlinked stories which celebrate Black love. After a summer heatwave causes a citywide power outage in New York City, Black teens explore love, friendships, and hidden truths over the course of a single day. Among the characters are exes who have to bury their rivalry to walk from Manhattan to Brooklyn for a block party, two boys who get trapped on the subway, and best friends who get stuck in the library.

== Reception ==
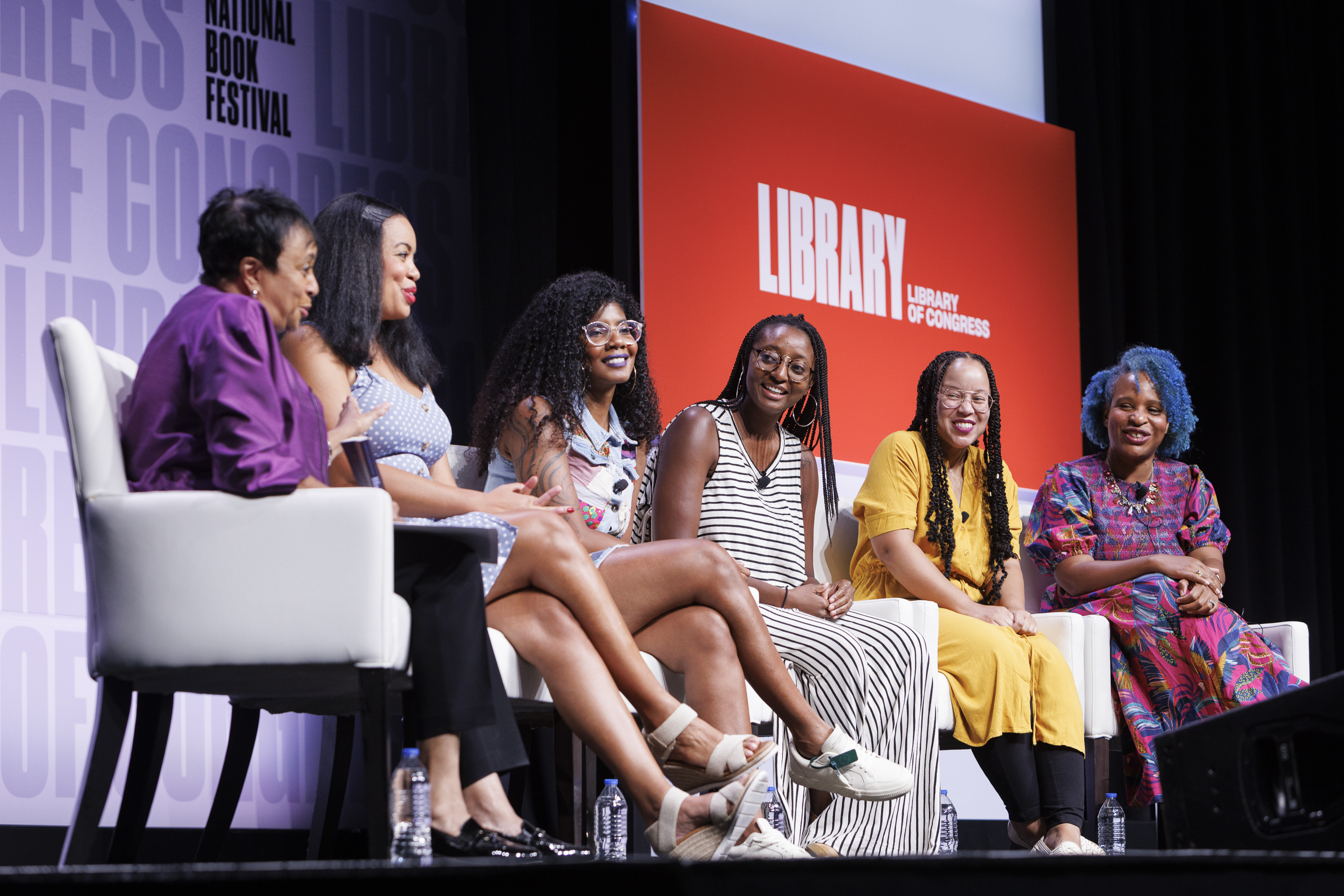
The authors in conversation with Librarian of Congress Carla Hayden at the National Book Festival in 2022

Blackout was generally well-received, including starred reviews from Booklist and Publishers Weekly.

In their review, Publishers Weekly noted, "[T]his joyful collaboration brings a necessary elation to stories of Black love, queer love, and alternative forms of affection." Rhonny Khuri, writing for Booklist, wrote, "Rich with intersectional queer representation and light with banter, humor, and even philosophy, this beautiful collaboration hits different from your typical romance novel, ultimately evoking the warmth of greater connection, community, and belonging."

Kirkus Reviews called Blackout "[a] celebration of Black teen love and the magic of possibility" while Shelf Awareness's Kharissa Kenner applauded how "[e]very character and every chapter celebrates Black culture through language, fashion and individuality."

In 2021, Blackout was named one of the top 10 romance novels for youth, as well as a top 10 pick for young adults, regardless of genre, by Publishers Weekly. The following year, Booklist selected it as one of the best young adult novels of the year.

Publishers Weekly named Blackout one of the best young adult books of 2021, and Booklist named it one of the best young adult books of 2022.

== Awards and honors ==
Blackout won the 2022 Audie Award for Short Stories or Collections.

== Adaptations ==
In July 2021, it was announced that the novel would be adapted into a TV series and a film. It will be a project produced for Netflix by Higher Ground Productions and Temple Hill Entertainment. Some of the stories from the novel may end up in the film, while others may appear in the television show.
