= Angie Thomas =

American author (born 1988)

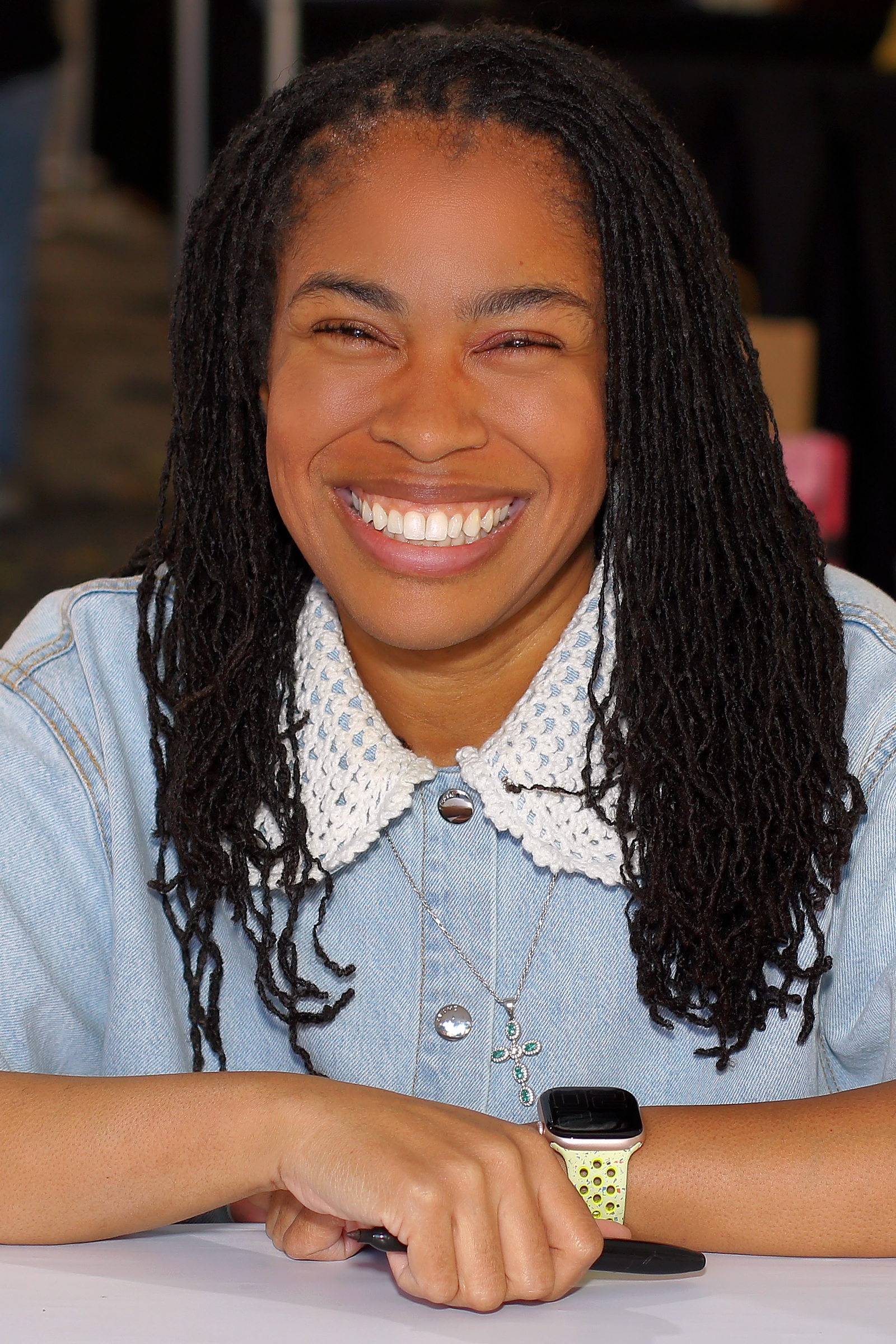
- Thomas at the 2025 Texas Book Festival
- Born: September 20, 1988 (age 38); Jackson, Mississippi, U.S.
- Education: Belhaven University (BFA)
- Occupation: Writer
- Writing career
- Language: English
- Genres: Young Adult Fiction, Middle Grade
- Notable works: The Hate U Give (2017); On the Come Up (2019)
- Website: www.angiethomas.com

Angela Thomas (born September 20, 1988) is an American young adult author, known for her contributions to young adult fiction. She gained international recognition for her novel The Hate U Give (2017) which addresses police violence and racism. Her second young adult novel, On the Come Up, was released on February 25, 2019. Her most recent novel, Concrete Rose, was released on January 12, 2021.

== Early life ==
Angie Thomas was born on September 20, 1988, in Jackson, Mississippi, where she was raised.

Thomas was subject to multiple instances of gun violence at a young age. She grew up near the home of assassinated civil rights activist, Medgar Evers, stating that her mother heard the gunshot that had killed him. When she was 6 years old, Thomas witnessed a shootout between gangs.

In an interview with The Guardian, she recounted how her mother took her to the library the following day to show her that, "There was more to the world than what [Thomas] saw that day." This inspired her to take up writing.

In her adolescence, Thomas shared her skills as a rapper, although her career in music was short-lived. She was, however, the subject of an article in Right On! magazine. Thomas went on to obtain a Bachelor of Fine Arts from Belhaven University. She was the first Black teenager to graduate from her creative writing course.

== Career ==
Thomas initially planned to write fantasy and middle grade novels, but began developing what would soon turn out to be her first novel while seeking publication for her earlier works. During her time in college, one of her professors suggested that her experiences were unique and that her writing could give a voice to those who had been silenced, thus developing The Hate U Give. After its publication, The Hate U Give was adapted into a 2018 film of the same name by Fox 2000, starring Amandla Stenberg.

The novel was influenced in part by contemporary events involving police violence, which includes the shooting of Oscar Grant, as well as the deaths of Trayvon Martin, Tamir Rice, Michael Brown, and Sandra Bland.

Thomas cites Tupac Shakur as inspiration for her writing. Especially in invoking a range of emotional responses from her readers. She has also stated that her writing is used to address and challenge social issues and stereotypes.

== Activism ==
In an interview with Publishers Weekly, Thomas gives insight on her role as an activist: "I've always seen writing as a form of activism. If nothing else, books give us a glimpse into lives that we may not have known about before; they can promote empathy. There is the movement Black Lives Matter and the organization Black Lives Matter, and I respect what both are doing. I know [The Hate U Give] is an 'issue' book, but I didn't necessarily want it to be that way... I wanted to make something that is so political seem personal. While I wanted Khalil to represent these young men who lose their lives and are quickly labeled thugs, I wanted [the plot of the book] to be its own thing. I didn't want to disrespect anyone's family, anyone's memory."

== Novels ==
=== The Hate U Give (2017) ===
The Hate U Give, originally written as a short story, debuted at No. 1 on the New York Times Best Seller list for young adult hardcover books within the first week of its release in 2017. The Hate U Give was written, as Thomas says, to bring light to the controversial issue of police brutality and the Black Lives Matter movement. The book's plot follows a teenage girl, Starr Carter, and how her life is impacted by the death of her friend, Khalil, an unarmed black teen shot by a white police officer. The Hate U Give deals with the effect of police brutality on the communities of those around the victim.

In 2018, the Katy Independent School District in Katy, Texas, removed the book from its shelves after complaints over profanity, and a South Carolina police union requested the book's removal from a school's summer reading list, because of what the union considered "almost an indoctrination of distrust of police."

=== On the Come Up (2019) ===
On the Come Up was released in February 2019. Thomas wrote the book so she could discuss the costs tolled on minorities and women when they do speak up. The book tells the story of a teen rapper who becomes a viral sensation and the way that this distorts and changes who she is. It takes place in the same fictional universe as The Hate U Give.

On the Come Up was a New York Times bestseller. Kirkus Reviews named it one of the best young adult novels of 2019. The novel was adapted into a movie of the same title in 2022 to exclusively stream on Paramount+.

=== Concrete Rose (2021) ===
Concrete Rose is a prequel to The Hate U Give and was released on January 12, 2021, in the US and the UK. The book tells the story of Starr's father Maverick Carter.

The book was a New York Times and IndieBound bestseller. Kirkus Reviews named it one of the best young adult novels of 2021.

=== Blackout (2021) ===
Thomas wrote a young adult novel Blackout, released in June 2021, which she co-authored with Dhonielle Clayton, Tiffany D. Jackson, Nic Stone, Ashley Woodfolk, and Nicola Yoon. The book follows six interlinked stories about Black teen love during a power outage in New York City.

=== Whiteout (2023) ===
Thomas co-authored a sequel to Blackout, titled Whiteout, with Dhonielle Clayton, Tiffany D. Jackson, Nic Stone, Ashley Woodfolk, and Nicola Yoon. The young adult novel follows the interwoven stories of twelve Black teens navigating love and heartbreak during a holiday snowstorm in Atlanta, Georgia.

=== Nic Blake and the Remarkables ===
She wrote the middle grade novels Nic Blake and the Remarkables: The Manifestor Prophecy (2024) and Nic Blake and the Remarkables: The Book of Anansi (2025).

=== Breakout (2026) ===
Thomas co-authored a thriller installment to the multi-authored Blackout and Whiteout collection written alongside Dhonielle Clayton, Tiffany D. Jackson, Nic Stone, Ashley Woodfolk, and Nicola Yoon. The young adult novel follows six teens working to solve a whodunnit murder mystery on a private island.

== Selected awards and honors ==
In 2015, Thomas received We Need Diverse Books' Walter Grant, which grants $2,000 to "unpublished authors or illustrators from diverse backgrounds working on children’s or young adult literature projects."

The Junior Library Guild has selected the book and audiobook editions of The Hate U Give, On the Come Up, and Concrete Rose for their collection.

The Hate U Give was a number one New York Times bestseller and IndieBound besteller. The Horn Book Magazine, Kirkus Reviews, Publishers Weekly, and Shelf Awareness, among others, named it one of the best young adult novels of 2017. Booklist named it one of the best books of the year regardless of genre.

On the Come Up was a New York Times bestseller. The Horn Book Magazine and Kirkus Reviews named it one of the best young adult novels of 2019. Booklist included it on their 2019 "Top 10 Arts Books for Youth" list.

Concrete Rose was a New York Times and IndieBound bestseller. Kirkus Reviews named it one of the best young adult novels of 2021.

Selected awards for Thomas's writing
Year	Title	Award	Result	Ref.
2017	The Hate U Give	Booklist Editors' Choice: Audio for Youth	Selection	
2017	The Hate U Give	Booklist Editors' Choice: Books for Youth	Selection	
2017	The Hate U Give	Boston Globe–Horn Book Award	Winner	
2017	The Hate U Give	Cybils Award for Young Adult Fiction	Finalist	
2017	The Hate U Give	Goodreads Choice Awards for Young Adult Fiction	Winner	
2017	The Hate U Give	Goodreads Choice Award for Debut Goodreads Author	Winner	
2017	The Hate U Give	Kirkus Prize	Finalist	
2017	The Hate U Give	National Book Award for Young Adult Literature	Longlist	
2018	The Hate U Give	Amazing Audiobooks for Young Adults	Top 10	
2018	The Hate U Give	Amelia Elizabeth Walden Award	Winner	
2018	The Hate U Give	Audie Award for Best Female Narrator	Winner	
2018	The Hate U Give	Audie Award for Young Adult	Winner	
2018	The Hate U Give	British Book Awards Children's Book of the Year	Shortlist	
2018	The Hate U Give	Carnegie Medal	Honour	
2018	The Hate U Give	Coretta Scott King Award	Honor	
2018	The Hate U Give	Deutscher Jugendliteraturpreis	Winner	
2018	The Hate U Give	Edgar Award Nominee for Best Young Adult	Winner	
2018	The Hate U Give	Goodreads Choice Award Best of the Best	Winner	
2018	The Hate U Give	Indies Choice Award for Young Adult Book of the Year	Winner	
2018	The Hate U Give	William C. Morris Award	Winner	
2018	The Hate U Give	ALSC Notable Children's Recordings	Selection	
2018	The Hate U Give	Odyssey Award for Excellence in Audiobook Production	Winner	
2018	The Hate U Give	Michael L. Printz Award	Honor	
2018	The Hate U Give	Quick Picks for Reluctant Young Adult Readers	Top 10	
2018	The Hate U Give	Waterstones Children's Book Prize	Winner	
2018	The Hate U Give	Waterstones Children's Book Prize for Older Fiction	Winner	
2019	On the Come Up	Booklist Editors' Choice: Books for Youth	Selection	
2019	On the Come Up	Boston Globe-Horn Book Award for Fiction & Poetry	Finalist	
2019	On the Come Up	Cybils Award for Young Adult Fiction	Finalist	
2019	On the Come Up	Goodreads Choice Award for Young Adult Fiction	Nominee	
2019	On the Come Up	Kirkus Prize for Young Readers' Literature	Finalist	
2020	On the Come Up	Amazing Audiobooks for Young Adults	Top 10	
2020	On the Come Up	Amelia Bloomer Book List	Selection	
2020	On the Come Up	Audie Award for Young Adult Title	Finalist	
2020	On the Come Up	ALA Best Fiction for Young Adults	Top 10	
2020	On the Come Up	Carnegie Medal for Young Adult Fiction	Shortlist	
2021	Concrete Rose	Cybils Award for Young Adult Fiction	Finalist	
2021	Concrete Rose	Goodreads Choice Award for Young Adult Fiction	Nominee	
2022	Concrete Rose	Michael L. Printz Award	Honor	
2022	Concrete Rose	Carnegie Medal for Young Adult Fiction	Longlist	
