= Nic Stone =

American writer

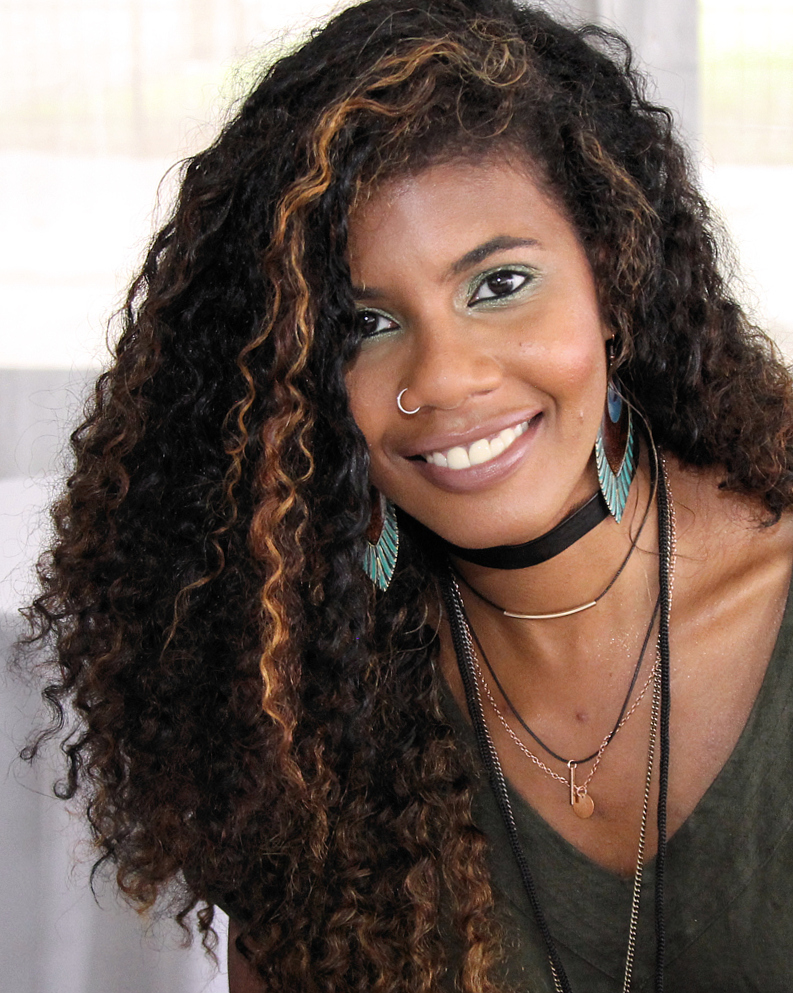
- Stone in 2017
- Born: July 10, 1985 (age 41); Atlanta, Georgia, U.S.
- Education: Spelman College
- Writing career
- Genre: Fiction for young adults
- Website: nicstone.info

Andrea Nicole Livingstone (born July 10, 1985), known as Nic Stone, is an American author of young adult fiction and middle grade fiction, best known for her debut novel Dear Martin and her middle grade debut, Clean Getaway. Her novels have been translated into six languages.

== Personal life ==
Stone was born and raised in a suburb of Atlanta, Georgia. She has a degree in Psychology from Spelman College. She is African-American and is openly bisexual. After college, she worked in teen mentoring. She moved to Israel for a few years.

== Career ==
During a trip to Israel in 2008, Stone discovered that she wanted to become a writer when encountering a family with a story that fascinated her. Stone wrote her first novel for young adults in 2017, inspired by American young adult novelist Veronica Roth's Divergent series because it was the first series featuring Black characters that she encountered that live until the end. That same book later landed her a literary agent.

=== Dear Martin ===
Her debut novel Dear Martin, about a high school senior in a predominantly white school who starts writing letters to Dr. Martin Luther King Jr. after he has a dangerous encounter with racist police officers, was sold as a proposal in a two-book deal and published in 2017 by Crown Books for Young Readers. Stone has stated she began writing her debut novel Dear Martin after the death of Jordan Davis, a 17-year-old black high school student who was fatally shot by a white man in a hate crime in 2012. The book debuted on the New York Times bestseller list at #4. It was also chosen as a finalist for the William C. Morris award in 2017 and received a starred review from Booklist. It has been published and translated in Germany, Brazil, Indonesia, The Netherlands, UK, Turkey, and Romania. Two years after it was first published, Dear Martin again hit the New York Times bestseller list, at #1 for Young Adult Paperbacks in February 2020.

A sequel, Dear Justyce, about an incarcerated teen who is on trial for murder charges, was published in October 2020. Stone says she was not planning on writing a sequel but was encouraged by her publisher, and decided to write a book about a "black boy that everybody is afraid of."

A sequel, Dear Manny, was published in March 2025.

=== Clean Getaway ===
Her middle-grade debut, Clean Getaway, illustrated by Dawud Anyabwile, was published by Crown in January 2020. It tells the story of 11-year-old Scoob, who goes on a roadtrip with his grandmother. It received starred reviews from Publishers Weekly and Booklist, and debuted on the Children's Middle Grade Hardcover New York Times bestseller list, at #5. Stone says the inspiration for the novel was a Twitter headline about a shoplifting grandma in Atlanta who turned out to be an international jewel thief.

=== Other works ===
Her second young adult novel, Odd One Out, is about three queer teenagers of color in a love triangle and explores themes of gender, sexual fluidity and identity. It was published in 2018 by Crown Books for Young Readers. It also received a starred review from Booklist. In 2019, her third novel, Jackpot, was published by Crown. The story follows high school senior and gas station cashier, Rico, after she sells a customer a jackpot-winning lottery ticket. Stone originally wrote the novel in 2015.

In September 2019, it was announced that Stone would write a novel focused on Shuri, from Marvel's Black Panther. It was published by Scholastic in 2020. Two more books were published in the Shuri series; Shuri: The Vanished in 2021 and Shuri: Symbiosis in 2022.

Stone wrote a young adult novel Blackout, released in June 2021, which she co-authored with Dhonielle Clayton, Tiffany D. Jackson, Angie Thomas, Ashley Woodfolk, and Nicola Yoon. A companion novel titled Whiteout was published in 2023.

Aside from young adult fiction and middle grade, Stone also writes essays, and her short fiction has appeared in multiple anthologies.

Stone co-authored a young adult companion to Ibram X. Kendi's New York Times best-selling book, How to Be an Antiracist, titled How to Be a (Young) Antiracist which was published in 2023.

Beginning in February 2022, Stone hosted a six-episode podcast series with Marvel and SiriusXM. The podcast series was titled, The History of Marvel Comics: Black Panther.

Stone was the keynote speaker at the AASL National Conference in 2023.

== Bibliography ==
Adult Fiction

- Boom Town (Simon & Schuster, 2025)

Young Adult fiction

- Dear Martin (Crown Books for Young Readers, 2017)
- Odd One Out (Crown Books for Young Readers, 2018)
- Jackpot (Crown Books for Young Readers, 2019)
- Shuri: A Black Panther Novel (Scholastic, 2020)
- Shuri: The Vanished (Scholastic, 2021)
- Dear Justyce (Crown Books for Young Readers, 2020)
- Shuri: Symbiosis (Scholastic, 2022)
- Chaos Theory (Crown Books for Young Readers, 2023)
- Dear Manny (Crown Books for Young Readers, 2025)

Middle Grade fiction

- Clean Getaway (Crown Books for Young Readers, 2020)
- Fast Pitch (Crown Books for Young Readers, 2021)

Cowritten Books

- Blackout (Quill Tree Books, 2021)
- Whiteout (Quill Tree Books, 2022)
- Breakout (Quill Tree Books, 2026)
