= Nicola Yoon =

Jamaican-American author (born 1972)

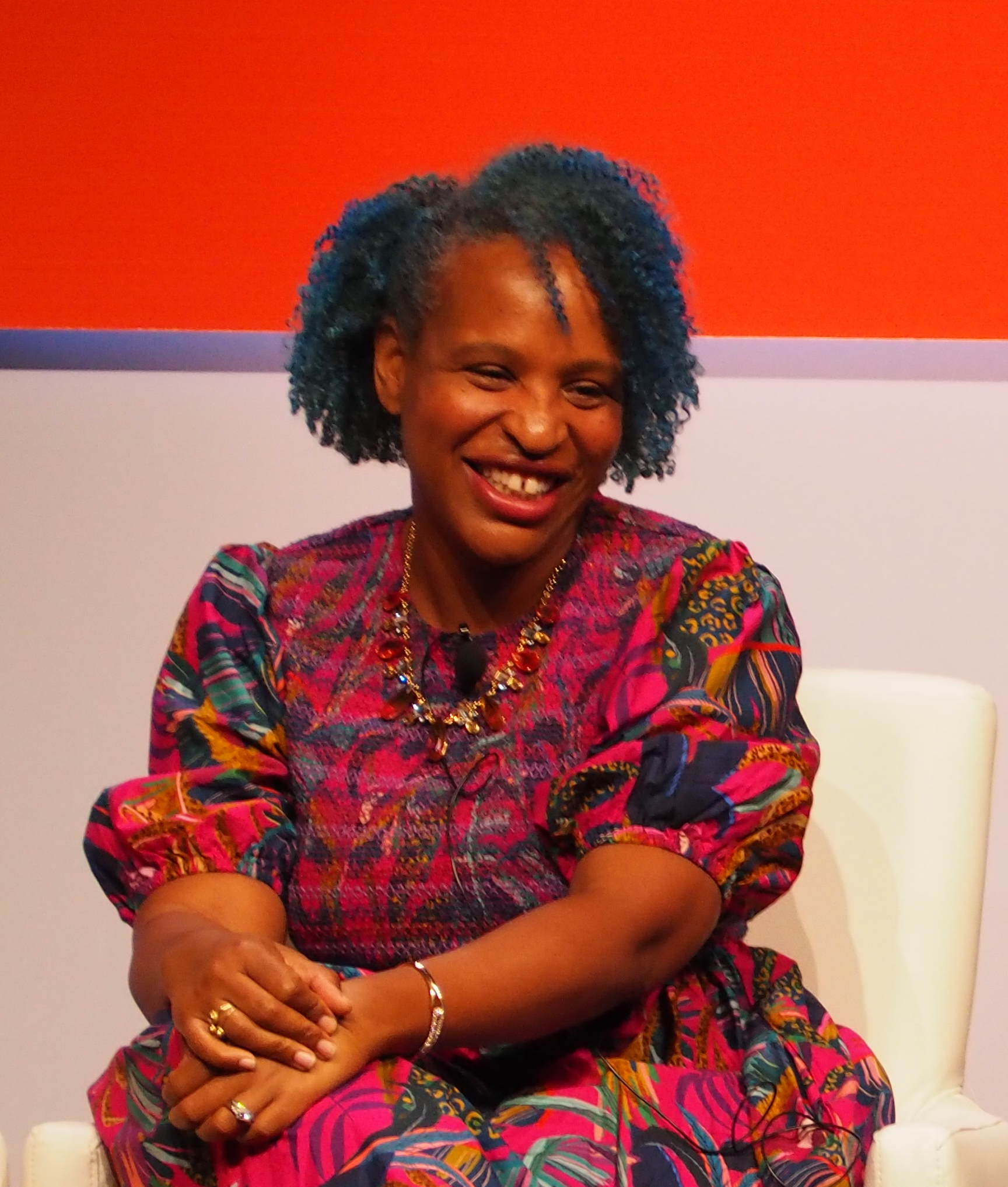
- Yoon in 2022
- Born: 1972 (age 53–54)
- Education: Cornell University; Emerson College
- Occupation: Author
- Notable work: Everything, Everything; The Sun Is Also a Star
- Spouse: David Yoon
- Website: nicolayoon.com

Nicola Yoon /ˈnɪkələ/ (born 1972) is a Jamaican-American author. She is best known for writing the 2015 young adult novel Everything, Everything, a New York Times best seller and the basis of a 2017 film of the same name. In 2016, she released The Sun Is Also a Star, a novel that was adapted to a 2019 film of the same name.

== Early life and education ==
Yoon grew up in Jamaica and in Brooklyn, New York. She majored in electrical engineering as an undergraduate at Cornell University. Taking a creative writing class as an elective got her "hooked on writing". After graduation, she attended the Master of Creative Writing program at Emerson College.

== Career ==
Yoon worked as a programmer for investment management firms for 20 years before the publication of her first book. She was inspired to write her debut novel, Everything, Everything, after the birth of her biracial daughter. Yoon wanted to write a book that reflected her child on the pages. Her first-time mother worries about protecting her baby from danger gave her the idea to write a story about a 17-year-old girl who needed the same level of protection. It took Yoon three years to write the book, writing early in the mornings while working full-time and raising her infant daughter. Her husband, Korean American graphic designer and author David Yoon, drew the illustrations.

Everything, Everything was released in September 2015, and debuted as No. 1 New York Times best seller for young adult hardcover books. The book spent 40 weeks on the best seller list. A film of the same name based on the book, adapted by J. Mills Goodloe and starring Amandla Stenberg and Nick Robinson, was released in May 2017.

Yoon's second book, The Sun Is Also a Star, was released in November 2016, and also reached number one on the New York Times Best Seller list. It was a 2016 National Book Award finalist, was included in The New York Times Book Review list of Notable Children's Books of 2016, and was listed in the top 10 books of 2016 by Entertainment Weekly and the Los Angeles Times. The Sun Is Also A Star was honored as a finalist of the Amelia Elizabeth Walden Award and received the John Steptoe Award for New Talent in 2017. In December 2016, it was announced that film rights to the book had been acquired by Warner Brothers and MGM. The movie, directed by Ry Russo-Young, and starring Yara Shahidi and Charles Melton, was released on May 17, 2019.

Yoon is associated with the We Need Diverse Books organization, which promotes the representation of diversity in literature.

She contributed to Because You Love to Hate Me, an anthology of short stories written by 13 YA authors who were paired with 13 BookTubers, who provided writing prompts. It was published in July 2017. More recently, she signed a deal with Anonymous Content, with David Yoon.

In Spring 2023, Yoon launched a young adult publishing imprint with her husband David called Joy Revolution Books. The imprint with Random House Children's Books is committed to publishing young adult romance novels starring people of color written by people of color.

== Personal life ==
Yoon lives in Los Angeles, California, with her husband, author David Yoon, and their daughter.

== Works ==
- Everything, Everything. Delacorte Press. 2015. ISBN 9780553496642.
- The Sun Is Also a Star. Delacorte Press. 2016. ISBN 9780553496680. Winner of the 2017 John Steptoe Award for New Talent.
- Blackout. Quill Tree Books. 2021. ISBN 978-0-06-308809-2. (co-authored with Dhonielle Clayton, Tiffany D. Jackson, Nic Stone, Ashley Woodfolk, and Angie Thomas)
- Whiteout. Quill Tree Books. 2023. ISBN 9780063088153. (co-authored with Dhonielle Clayton, Tiffany D. Jackson, Nic Stone, Ashley Woodfolk, and Angie Thomas)
- Instructions for Dancing. Delacorte Press. 2021. ISBN 978-1-5247-1896-1
- One of Our Kind. Penguin Random House. 2024. ISBN 978-0-593-47067-1
- Breakout. Quill Tree Books. 2026. ISBN 978-0-06-321750-8 (co-authored with Dhonielle Clayton, Tiffany D. Jackson, Nic Stone, Ashley Woodfolk, and Angie Thomas)
- Always One More Time. Delacorte Press. Forthcoming February 2, 2027. ISBN 978-1-5247-1900-5
