= Dhonielle Clayton =

American author and chief operating officer of We Need Diverse Books

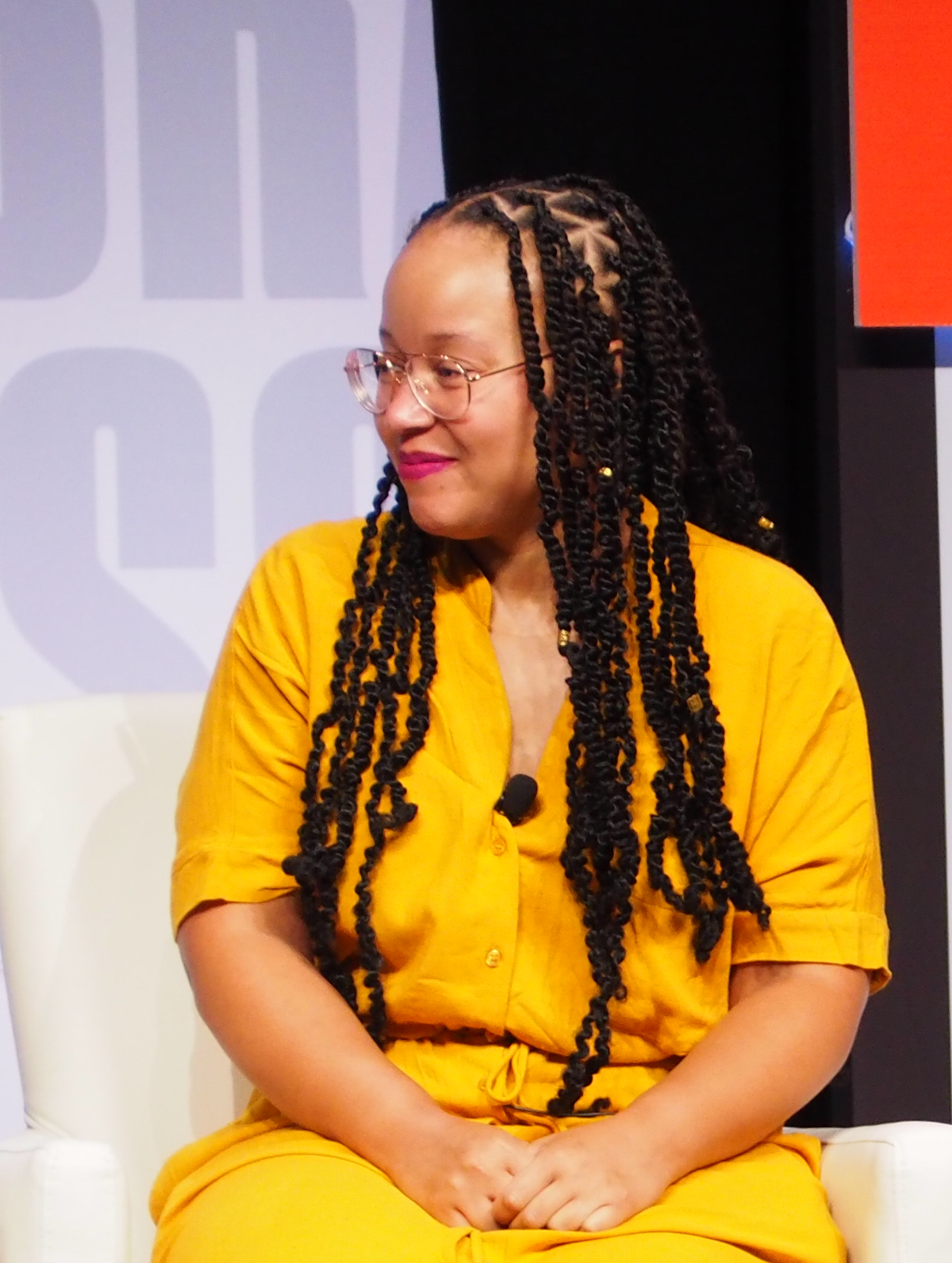
- Born: 1983 (age 42–43); Washington, D.C., U.S.
- Education: Wake Forest University (BA); Hollins University (MA); The New School (MFA)
- Writing career
- Notable works: The Belles series (2018–2023); Blackout (2021)
- Website: dhonielleclayton.com

Dhonielle Clayton (born 1983) is an American author and chief operating officer of We Need Diverse Books. She has written multiple book series, including The Belles trilogy and Tiny Pretty Things series. She also collaborated with Tiffany D. Jackson, Angie Thomas, Nic Stone, Ashley Woodfolk, and Nicola Yoon to write Blackout (2021).

== Early life and education ==
Clayton was born in Washington, D.C. She went to Our Lady Of Good Counsel in Wheaton, Maryland. She received a Bachelor of Arts from Wake Forest University in 2005, a Master of Arts from Hollins University in 2008, and Master of Fine Arts in creative writing from The New School in 2012.

== Career ==
Beyond writing, Clayton is president and owner of Cake Creative and Electric Postcard Entertainment, two boutique book packagers and Chief Operating Officer of We Need Diverse Books, which seeks to increase representations of marginalized groups in children and young adult literature. She also works as a sensitivity reader for children's literature and works to identify stereotypes or inauthentic portrayals of Black characters. She has also advocated for books to better represent people of color.

In 2019, Clayton and Zoraida Córdova started a podcast together called Deadline City. Together they co-host episodes and talk about publishing topics and their own experiences in publishing.

She is a writing coach at The Novelry.

== Criticism ==
In 2019, Clayton attracted criticism for negative Tweets about a student of Northern State University, who had advocated for the inclusion of three books by persons of colour, including Bryan Stevenson's memoir Just Mercy about racial injustice, instead of a YA novel by Sarah Dessen, in the university's "Common Reads" program. Clayton later deleted the tweets.

== Selected texts ==
=== Tiny Pretty Things series (2015–2023) ===
Clayton co-authored the Tiny Pretty Things series with Sona Charaipotra. The series, which debuted in 2015, follows three teenage dance students at New York's American Ballet Company. Kirkus referred to volume one as "a page-turner with heart."

In 2020, Tiny Pretty Things made its debut on Netflix as a series.

=== The Belles series (2018–2023) ===
The Belles series consists of three novels: The Belles (2018), The Everlasting Rose (2019) and The Beauty Trials (2023). The series was inspired by Clayton's interest as a teenager in magazines, beauty and how they affected the way she viewed herself later. The fantasy young adult novel centers a 16-year-old girl and her sisters, tasked with restoring beauty to a colorless grey world.

=== Blackout (2021) ===
Blackout, co-authored with Tiffany D. Jackson, Angie Thomas, Nic Stone, Ashley Woodfolk, and Nicola Yoon, was published June 22, 2021 by Quill Tree Books. The authors have cited the book as being Clayton's "brainchild."

Blackout is currently slated to become a movie and TV show produced by the Obamas for Netflix.

== Awards and honors ==
In 2021, Clayton won the IGNYTE Awards' Ember Award for Unsung Contributions to Genre.

Four of Clayton's books are Junior Library Guild selections: The Belles (2018) and The Everlasting Rose (2019), as well as the book and audiobook editions of Blackout (2021).

The Belles book was a New York Times bestseller. The Chicago Public Library (CPL) and Kirkus Reviews named it one of the best young adult books of 2018. CPL also included it on their list of the best teen book covers of the year.

The Marvellers was a New York Times bestseller. Kirkus Reviews named it one of the best young adult books of 2022.

Blackout was named one of the best young adult novels of 2021 by Publishers Weekly.

Awards for Clayton's writing
Year	Work	Award	Result	Ref.
2018	The Belles	Booklist Editors' Choice: Books for Youth	Selection	
2018	The Belles	Goodreads Choice Award for Young Adult Fantasy & Science Fiction	Nominee	
2019	The Belles	ALA Amazing Audiobooks for Young Adults	Selection	
2019	The Belles	ALA Best Fiction for Young Adults	Selection	
2019	The Belles	Children's & Teen Choice Book Awards	Finalist	
2019	The Belles	Locus Award for Best Young Adult Book	Nominee	
2019	The Belles	Lodestar Award for Best Young Adult Book	Nominee	
2020	Black Enough	Amazing Audiobooks for Young Adults	Selection	
2020	The Everlasting Rose	IGNYTE Award for Best Young Adult Novel	Nominee	
2022	Blackout	ALA Best Fiction for Young Adults	Top 10	
2022	Blackout	Audie Award for Short Stories or Collections	Winner	
2022	Blackout	Quick Picks for Reluctant Young Adult Readers	Selection	
2022	The Marvellers	Cybils Award for Elementary and Middle Grade Speculative Fiction	Finalist	
2023	The Rumor Game	Quick Picks for Reluctant Young Adult Readers	Selection	

== Published works ==
=== Novels ===
==== Standalone books ====
- Blackout, co-authored with Tiffany D. Jackson, Nic Stone, Angie Thomas, Ashley Woodfolk, and Nicola Yoon (2021)
- The Rumor Game with Sona Charaipotra (2022)
- Whiteout, co-authored with Tiffany D. Jackson, Nic Stone, Angie Thomas, Ashley Woodfolk, and Nicola Yoon (2022)

==== The Belles trilogy ====
1. The Belles (2018)
2. The Everlasting Rose (2019)
3. The Beauty Trials (2023)

==== Conjureverse series ====
1. The Marvellers (2022)
2. The Memory Thieves (2023)
3. The Deadly Fates (2025)

==== The Mirror series ====
Each of the books in The Mirror series is authored by a different author. Clayton authored the second book in the series.

- Shattered Midnight (2022)

==== Tiny Pretty Things series ====
1. Tiny Pretty Things with Sona Charaipotra (2015)
2. Shiny Broken Pieces with Sona Charaipotra (2016)

=== Short stories ===
- "When the Moonlight Isn't Enough" in The Radical Element, edited by Jessica Spotswood (2018)
- "The Need for Kisses" in Well-Read Black Girl: Finding Our Stories, Discovering Ourselves, edited by Glory Edim (2018)
- "The Way We Love Here" in Meet Cute: Some People Are Destined to Meet (2018)
- "Dear Nora James, You Know Nothing About Love" in Unbroken: 13 Stories Starring Disabled Teens, edited by Marieke Nijkamp (2018)
- "Hearts Turned to Ash" in A Phoenix First Must Burn, edited by Patrice Caldwell (2020)
- "The House of Black Sapphires" in Vampires Never Get Old: Tales with Fresh Bite, edited by Zoraida Córdova and Natalie C. Parker (2020)

=== Anthologies edited ===
- A Universe of Wishes: We Need Diverse Books Anthology (2020)
