= Tiffany D. Jackson =

American author and filmmaker

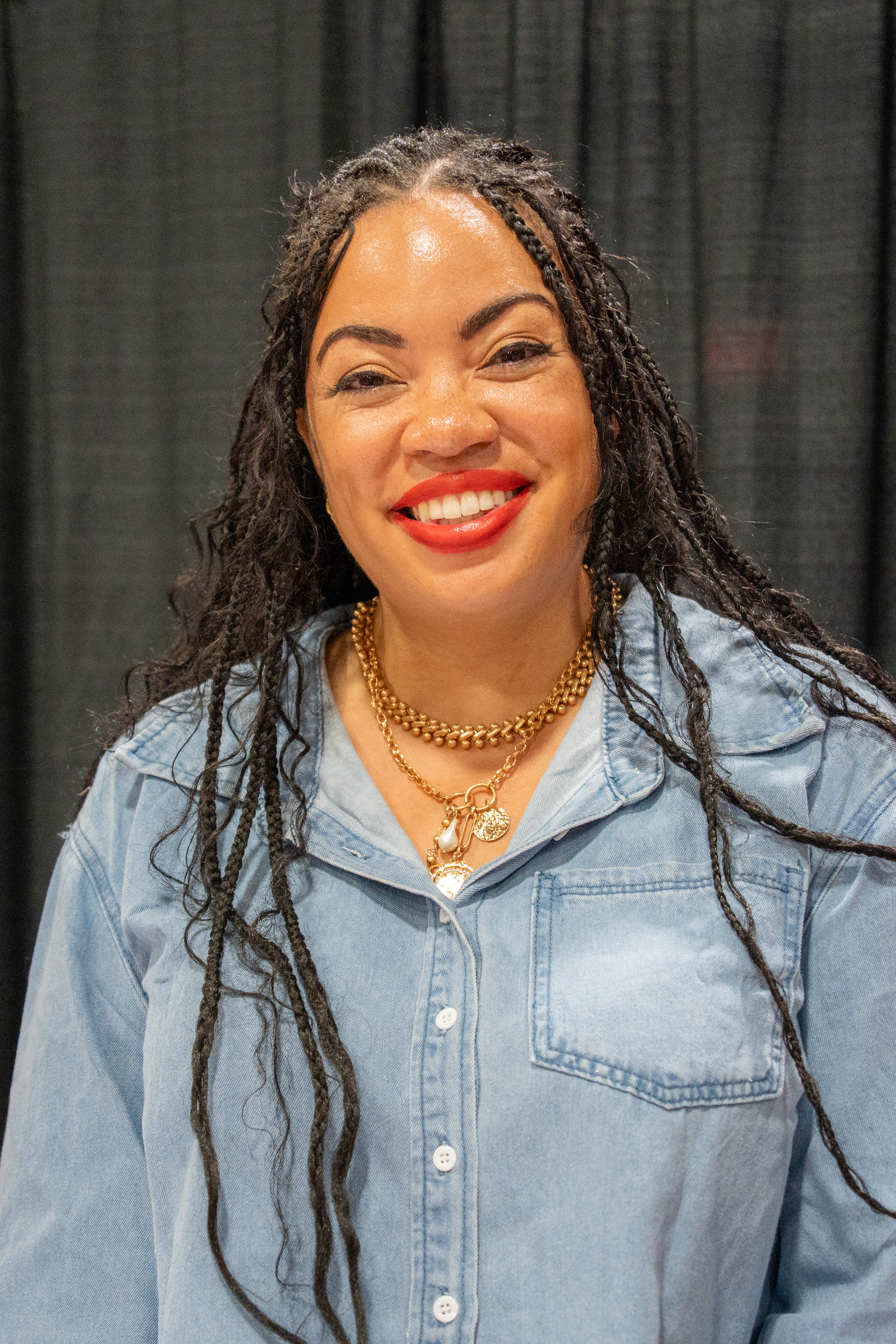
- Jackson at the National Book Festival 2025
- Born: New York City, U.S.
- Education: Howard University (BA); The New School (MA)
- Occupation: Writer
- Writing career
- Language: English
- Years active: 2010–present
- Genre: Young adult fiction
- Notable works: Allegedly (2017); Grown (2020); White Smoke (2021)
- Website: writeinbk.com

Tiffany D. Jackson is an American author and filmmaker. She writes young adult fiction and makes horror films. She is best known for her NAACP Image Award—nominated debut novel Allegedly.

== Personal life ==
Jackson was born in New York and grew up in Brooklyn Heights. She states that she first started wanting to become a writer when she was four years old.

Jackson attended Hendrick Hudson High School and Howard University, where she studied film, and ultimately moved back to New York to obtain her master's degree in Media Studies from The New School.

She lives in Brooklyn.

== Selected works ==
Jackson is a New York Times Bestselling author. Jackson's debut young adult novel Allegedly (2017), about a teen who is accused of having murdered a baby when she was nine years old and finds out she is pregnant while living in a group home, was published by Katherine Tegen Books in 2017. Jackson conducted research for the novel by talking to lawyers, doctors, social workers, correctional officers, group home supervisors, and detectives, but still didn't find she obtained concrete answers as to how the criminal justice system works in the US, referring to how crimes are judged, regardless of the severity. Allegedly received several starred reviews and was nominated for an NAACP Image Award for Outstanding Literary Work – Youth/Teens in 2017. It was also on the Best YA of 2017 list of Kirkus Reviews, School Library Journal, New York Public Library, Chicago Public Library, and Texas Library Association.

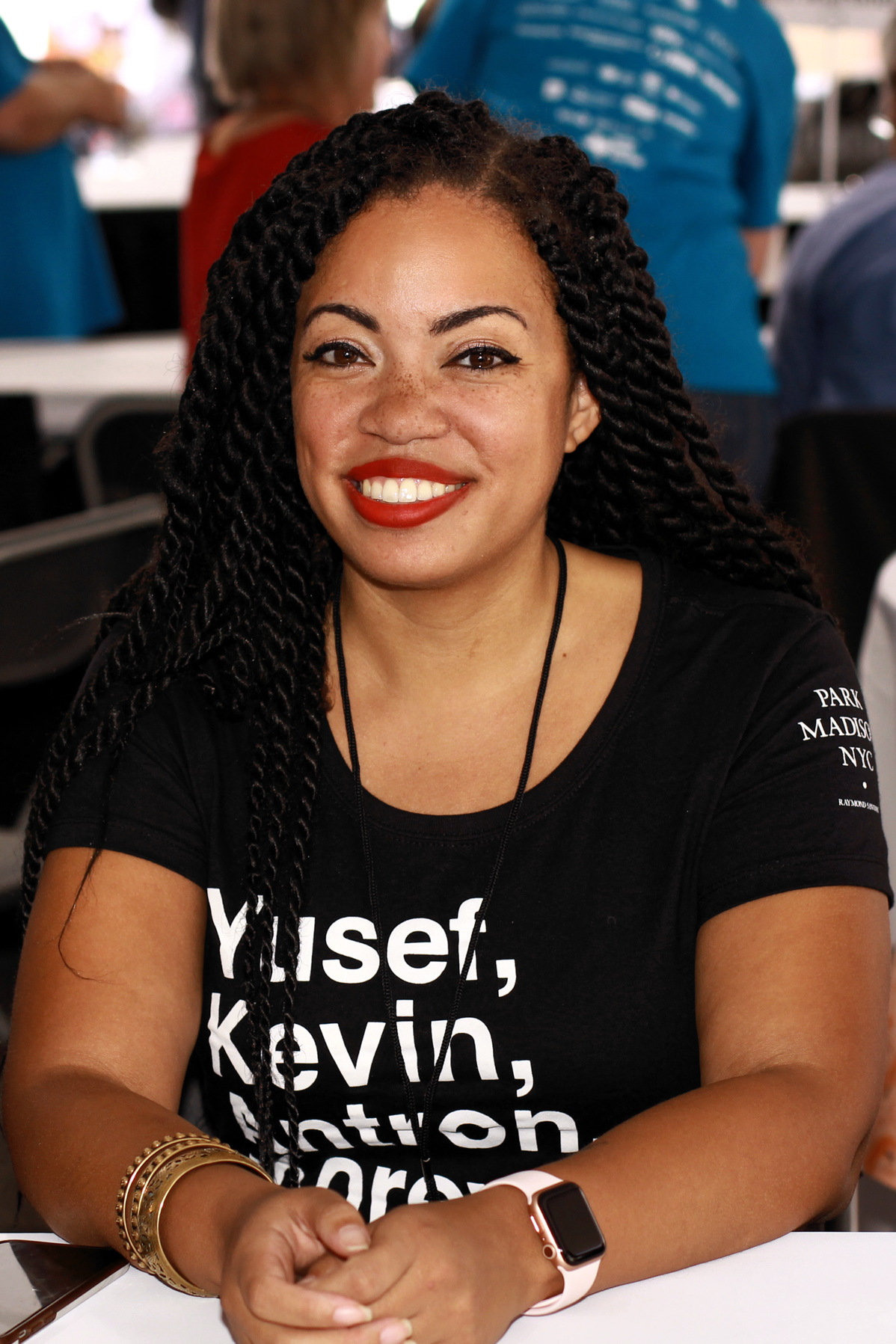
Jackson at the 2019 Texas Book Festival

Her second young adult novel, Monday's Not Coming, about a girl whose best friend mysteriously disappears, was published in 2018 by Katherine Tegen Books. Monday's Not Coming received starred reviews from Publishers Weekly and School Library Journal. It was inspired by numerous disappearances of black girls all across the United States, which eventually led to the creation of the hashtag #MissingDCGirls. School Library Journal named Monday's Not Coming a best book of 2018. In 2019, Jackson was awarded the John Steptoe Award for New Talent.

Jackson's third novel, Let Me Hear a Rhyme, set in 1998, is about three teens from Brooklyn who turn their late friend into a rap star and was published by Katherine Tegen Books in 2019. It debuted to favorable reviews from critics, receiving starred reviews from Kirkus Reviews, Booklist, and Publishers Weekly.

Her fourth novel, Grown, about a teenage singer getting her big break in the music industry and being targeted by a predatory rock star, was published in September 2020, by Katherine Tegen Books. Jackson says while the allegations against R. Kelly inspired the novel, Grown also tackles the history of abuse of power and participating in rape culture pervasive in the entertainment industry, and how the systems in place specifically fail young Black women. The novel debuted as #4 on the Young Adult Hardcover New York Times bestseller list. It was also a nominee for the Goodreads Choice Award in Young Adult fiction in 2020.

Jackson's sixth novel and her horror debut, White Smoke (2021), about a teen moving into a haunted house, was published by Katherine Tegen Books in September 2021. She says the story was inspired by a trip to Detroit and a haunted house case in Japan she read about. The novel debuted on the Young Adult Hardcover New York Times bestseller list, at #6.

In February 2020, it was announced that Jackson's debut picture book Santa in the City, about a girl determined to prove that Santa is real, sold in a five-house auction. It was published by Dial in November 2021 with illustrations by Reggie Brown.

Jackson's second picture book, Trick-or-Treating in the City, was published by Dial in August 2024 with illustrations by Sawyer Cloud.

== Bibliography ==
=== Novels ===
- Allegedly (Katherine Tegen Books, 2017)
- Monday's not coming. Katherine Tegen Books. 2018.
- Let Me Hear a Rhyme (Katherine Tegen Books, 2019)
- Grown (Katherine Tegen Books, 2020)
- The Awakening of Malcolm X (Farrar, Straus and Giroux, 2021), co-written with Ilyasah Shabazz
- White Smoke (Katherine Tegen Books, 2021)
- Blackout (Quill Tree Books, 2021), co-editor with Dhonielle Clayton, and contributor
- The Weight of Blood (HarperCollins, 2022)
- The Scammer (Quill Tree Books, 2025)

=== Picture books ===
- Santa in the City, illustrated by Reggie Brown (Dial, 2021)
- Trick-or-Treating in the City, illustrated by Sawyer Cloud (Dial, 2024)

=== Short fiction ===
Stories (Note: Short stories unless otherwise noted.)

Title	Year	First published	Reprinted/collected	Notes
It's carnival!	2019	Jackson, Tiffany D. (2019). "It's carnival!". In Adler, Dahlia (ed.). His hideous heart : thirteen of Edgar Allan Poe's most unsettling tales reimagined. New York: Flatiron Books.		

=== Critical studies and reviews of Jackson's work ===
Monday's not coming

- Bartlett, Lexey A. (Fall 2024). "Claudia Coleman's one and only case : the trauma of detection in Monday's Not Coming by Tiffany D. Jackson". Clues : a journal of detection. 42 (2): 121–132.

———————

Bibliography notes

== Filmography ==
Year	Title	Role	Notes
2010	So I Married A Vampire	Writer, Director	Web series
2011	The Field Trip	Writer, Director	Short film

== Awards ==
- Margaret A. Edwards Award (2025)

Nominations

- NAACP Image Award for Outstanding Literary Work – Youth / Teens for Allegedly (2017)
- 2019 Coretta Scott King-John Steptoe Author Award – Monday's Not Coming (2018)
