= Four Hundred Souls =

2021 anthology edited by Ibram X. Kendi and Keisha N. Blain

Four Hundred Souls: A Community History of African America, 1619–2019
- First edition cover
- Editors: Ibram X. Kendi; Keisha N. Blain
- Cover artist: Bayo Iribhogbe (art); Michael Morris (design)
- Language: English
- Subject: African-American history
- Publisher: One World
- Publication date: February 2, 2021
- Publication place: United States
- Media type: Print (hardcover and paperback), e-book, audiobook
- Pages: 528
- Award: Earphones Award for Best Audiobook (AudioFile)
- ISBN: 978-0-593-13404-7 (First edition hardcover)
- OCLC: 1184240347
- Dewey Decimal: 973/.0496073
- LC Class: E185 .F625 2021

Four Hundred Souls: A Community History of African America, 1619–2019 is a 2021 anthology of essays, commentaries, personal reflections, short stories, and poetry, compiled and edited by Ibram X. Kendi and Keisha N. Blain. Conceived and created to commemorate the four hundred years that had passed since the arrival of the first Africans in Virginia, the book concerns African-American history and collects works written by ninety Black writers. A winner or finalist of multiple awards in its print and audiobook editions, Four Hundred Souls has been widely praised by reviewers for its prose and historical content.

== Background ==
From 1841 to 2019, the vast majority of books telling a history of African America were written by individuals, also almost always male. As the 400th anniversary of Black Africans' arrival in British North America approached, Ibram X. Kendi contemplated how to commemorate the "symbolic birthday of Black America" and the whole 400-year period. Kendi resolved to invert the trend by "bringing together a community of writers" and encouraging them to both write history and make history, creating an artifact capturing what Black Americans were thinking during that anniversary year.

Kendi and Keisha N. Blain collaborated to compile and edit the book project, titled Four Hundred Souls: A Community History of African America, 1619–2019, and together they invited ten poets and eighty writers from a diverse range of professions—including historians, anthropologists, journalists, novelists, economists, theologians, educators, and more—to contribute. Reviewer Don Polite called the resulting contributor list a "who's who of African America" and "a remarkable cross section of the Black community". Many contributors are "huge names", but Four Hundred Souls also features numerous "up-and-coming writers". Most of the authors wrote their chapters in 2019.

Blain remembered the process being a "moving experience". The COVID-19 pandemic began while Kendi and Blain were in the process of assembling the book; feeling that she was at work on something historically significant comforted Blain during a time of intense loss and loneliness. The book is dedicated "to Black lives lost to COVID-19".

While contrasting with past single-author histories of Black America, Four Hundred Souls also emerges in a tradition of Black-written anthologies "of historical observations, poetry, scholarship, and vignettes" in the vein of Abraham Chapman's Black Voices: An Anthology of Afro-American Literature and Maya Angelou's I Know Why the Caged Bird Sings.

During a later stage of producing the book, Kendi and Blain decided that for the audiobook version, they wanted to "actualize what [Kendi] wrote about" in his introductory description of the book's "community of writers [being] like a choir". To evoke this effect, they chose to pursue a full-cast audiobook. The cast features eighty-seven narrators, some of whom are contributors to the book who narrate their own chapters. Others feature only as narrators in the audiobook; this cast includes actress Danai Gurira, broadcast journalist Soledad O'Brien, and singer Phylicia Rashad, among many others. In the interest of enabling each narrator to give a passionate performance, the producers did not assign chapters to narrators and instead allowed cast members to choose which contributions they were interested in narrating. Narration was recorded in December 2020 and January 2021. Because of the COVID-19 pandemic, most narrators recorded at home studio setups.

== Summary ==
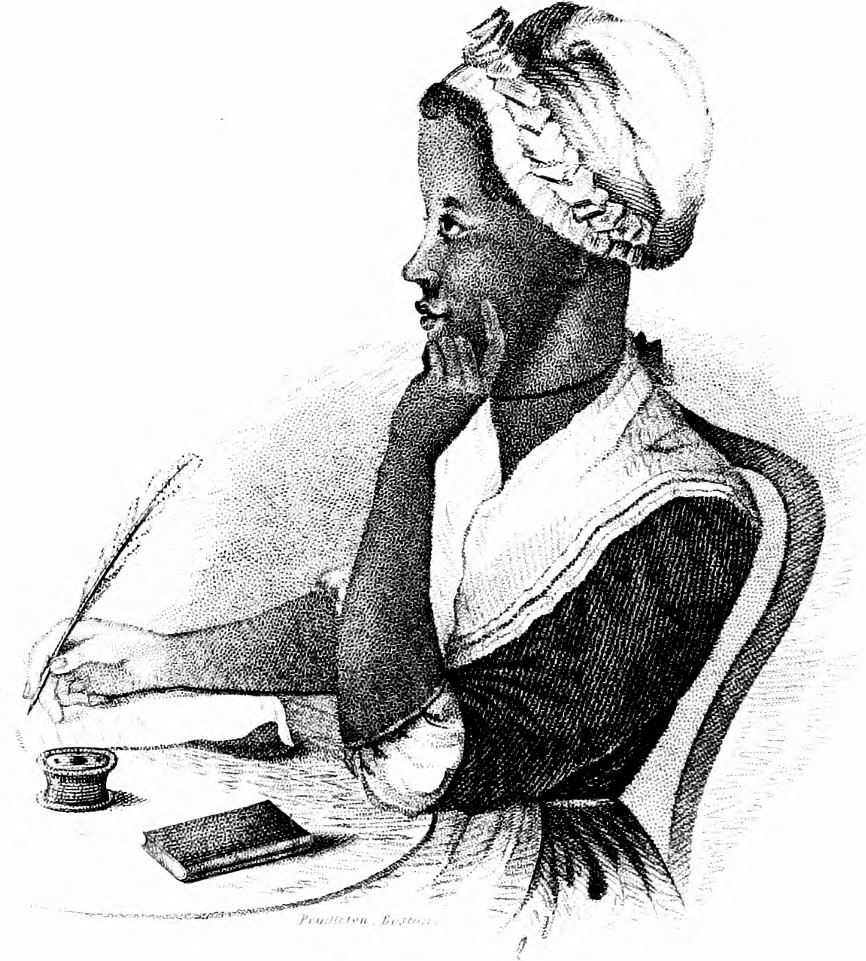
Phyllis Wheatley is the subject of a chapter in Four Hundred Souls.

Four Hundred Souls features essays, biographical sketches, short stories, and poems by ninety Black writers. It chronologically spans the 400-year length of African-American history, beginning in 1619 with the arrival of the first Africans in Virginia and ending in 2019. The book is divided into ten sections, each of which examine a period of 40 years. Each section concludes with a poem. There are eighty essays featured in the book, each of which chronicle a five-year period. Kendi and Blain invited some contributors to write about specific topics, such as asking Barbara Smith to write about the Combahee River Collective. With other writers, they worked together to find subjects that were good fits. In every case, the choice was up to the contributor. This "democratising approach" makes Four Hundred Souls a "people's history" told by and about African Americans themselves.

Following an introduction by Ibram X. Kendi, the anthology begins with an essay by Nikole Hannah-Jones, who developed The New York Times' 1619 Project. Chapter subjects include policy, political events, elements of culture, revised historical narratives, and biographies. Some chapters offer fresh insight on well-known subjects, such as the essays on Phyllis Wheatley, Booker T. Washington, and Black Power; while others spotlight little-known history, such as the life of Black New Yorker James McCune Smith. Each essay can function and be read individually, but together they highlight the "entangled histories" of African America. The book's final essay is written by Alicia Garza, who co-founded the Black Lives Matter movement.

Thematic threads weave through the chronological chapters, such as the theme of white–Black sexual encounters or perceptions (threading "Whipped for Lying With a Black Woman", "Sally Hemings", "Lynching", and "Anita Hill"). Another theme is the dynamism of enslavement and racism, as chapters explore how white Americans shifted strategies in attempts to preserve power and how Black Americans perpetually "sought to define their freedom." The resilience of the Black American community is another important theme in Four Hundred Souls. The book portrays "the endurance and resilience of how Blacks resisted, revolted, organized, demanded, protested and rebelled", as reviewer George McCalman describes. Four Hundred Souls also leverages its diverse pool of contributors to deconstruct the notion of a monolithic African America. Advancing this theme, the book's "eighty different minds, reflecting eighty different perspectives" reveals a "community of difference" that brings together Black America without homogenizing the many individuals in the community.

For the audiobook edition, each chapter is read by one of the cast's eighty-seven narrators. The readings vary in tone across the book, ranging between "straightforward or theatrical as appropriate" to the chapter. Between chapters, multiple narrators read the transitions simultaneously, their voices overlapping in collective lines. In the credits, each cast member speaks their own name.

== Publication ==
One World, an imprint of Random House, published Four Hundred Souls and released the book on February 2, 2021. The book sold as a 528-page hardcover for $32 (~$38.00 in 2025) (USD) on release. The cover, designed by Michael Morris, features artwork by Bayo Iribhogbe that according to editor Blain depicts the book's "spirit of community". A paperback edition was released a year later, on February 1, 2022.

Penguin Random House released the audiobook of Four Hundred Souls in February 2021, selling the trade edition for $22.50 and the library edition for $95. The audiobook edition does not include the endnotes of the print version. Its runtime is fourteen hours and two minutes.

== Reception ==
Ahead of and upon its release, Four Hundred Souls met wide approval from readers and reviewers. The book debuted at number two on The New York Times nonfiction bestseller list for the week ending February 6, 2021. In September 2021, GOBI Library Solutions ranked Four Hundred Souls second in a list of forty academic bestsellers for that year. Washington Post editors and reviewers numbered it among the Post's "50 notable works of nonfiction" in 2021. Four Hundred Souls was also an IndieBound Bestseller.

Publishers Weekly described the book as an "energetic collection" that "stands apart from standard anthologies of African American history." Writing for Booklist, Leslie Williams wrote that Four Hundred Souls "crackles with rage, beauty, bitter humor, and the indomitable will to survive." In a starred review, Kirkus Reviews called it an "impeccable, epic, essential vision of American history as a whole and a testament to the resilience of Black people." Kirkus singled out the essays of Raquel Willis, Robert Jones Jr., Barbara Smith, and Esther Armah as the "standouts" in the book. Binghamton University newspaper BingUNews called Four Hundred Souls "one of [Keisha N.] Blain's most significant professional accomplishments". Seattle Book Reviews rated Four Hundred Souls five stars out of five.

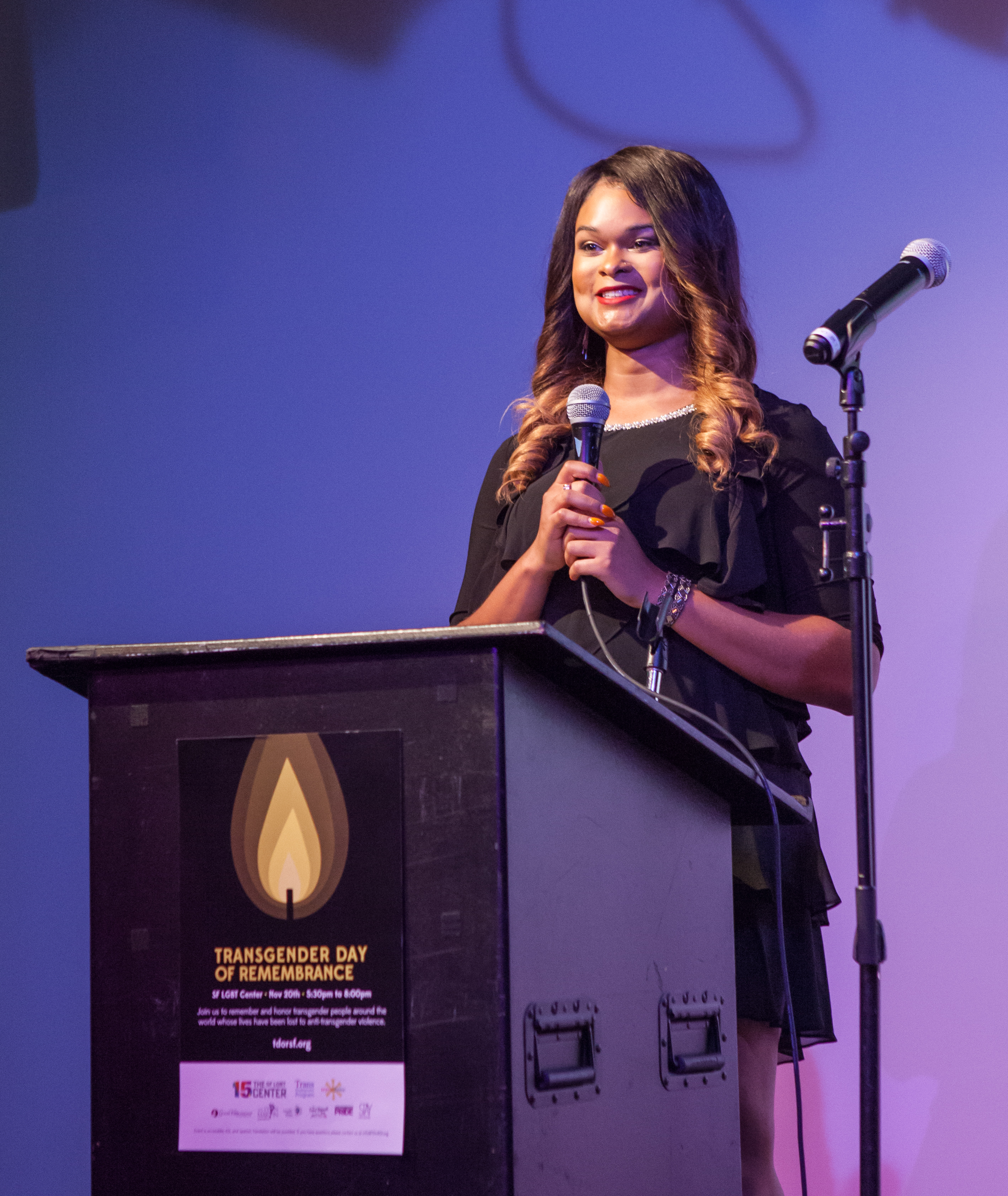
According to Kirkus Reviews, the contribution by Raquel Willis (above) was a "standout" chapter.

Numerous reviewers urged the public to read it and for libraries to stock it. Library Journal declared Four Hundred Souls essential to include in libraries. Reviewer Don Polite especially praised its essay format, suggesting the book is "almost tailor-made" to accompany undergraduate courses or inspire discussion in community spaces.

In an otherwise glowing review of the book, Randal Maurice Jelks pointed out Four Hundred Souls' "sparse attention" to Black-created institutions such as churches, banks, businesses, cubs, temples, mosques, and more; only a few chapters in the book directly address Black institutions despite their importance in the African American experience. Although the book includes endnotes, Library Journal suggests that readers seeking a traditionally "scholarly treatment of the history of racism in the United States" might be better served by a book like Kendi's Stamped from the Beginning.

The magazine BookPage recognized Four Hundred Souls' audiobook edition with a starred review and praised the cast as a "heartfelt chorus of voices". BookPage's review noted the "layered, echoing voices" used in the audiobook's transitions and complimented the "haunting, emotional effect" achieved by such collective lines. AudioFile magazine spotlighted J. D. Jackson, Kevin R. Free, January LaVoy, and Robin Miles for being especially "masterful" while adding that "at least two dozen more" narrators deserved the same praise.

In 2021, AudioFile recognized Four Hundred Souls with its Earphones Award for Best Audiobook. The American Library Association shortlisted Four Hundred Souls as a finalist for the 2022 Andrew Carnegie Medal for Excellence in Nonfiction. Four Hundred Souls was also a 2022 finalist for the Multi-voiced Performance category of the Audie Awards administered by the Audio Publishers Association.

== Table of contents ==
Four Hundred Souls is comprised of four parts, each of which contains ten essays and ends with a poem. The audiobook adds narrators.

	Period	Writer	Narrator (Note: Specifically for the audiobook edition.)	Title
Introduction		Ibram X. Kendi	Ibram X. Kendi	"A Community of Souls"
Part One	1619–1624	Nikole Hannah-Jones	Nikole Hanna-Jones	"Arrival"
Part One	1624–1629	Molefi Kete Asante	Zainab Jah	"Africa"
Part One	1629–1634	Ijeoma Oluo	Soneela Nankani	"Whipped for Lying with a Black Woman"
Part One	1634–1639	DaMaris B. Hill	Bahni Turpin	"Tobacco"
Part One	1639–1644	Brenda E. Stevenson	Imani Parks	"Black Women's Labor"
Part One	1644–1649	Maurice Carlos Ruffin	Adam Lazarre-White	"Anthony Johnson, Colony of Virginia"
Part One	1649–1654	Heather Andrea Williams	James Monroe Iglehart	"The Black Family"
Part One	1654–1659	Nakia D. Parker	Brianna Collette	"Unfree Labor"
Part One	Poem	Jericho Brown	J. D. Jackson	"Upon Arrival"
Part Two	1659–1664	Jennifer L. Morgan	Chanté McCormick	"Elizabeth Keye"
Part Two	1664–1669	Jemar Tisby	Donte Bonner	"The Virginia Law on Baptism"
Part Two	1669–1674	David A. Love	Peter Francis James	"The Royal African Company"
Part Two	1674–1679	Heather C. McGhee	Heather C. McGhee	"Bacon's Rebellion"
Part Two	1679–1684	Kellie Carter Jackson	Kellie Carter Jackson	"The Virginia Law That Forbade Bearing Arms; or the Virginia Law That Forbade Armed Self-Defense"
Part Two	1684–1689	Laurence Ralph	Terrence Kidd	"The Code Noir"
Part Two	1689–1694	Christopher J. Lebron	Bill Quinn	"The Germantown Petition Against Slavery"
Part Two	1694–1699	Mary E. Hicks	Susan Heyward	"The Middle Passage"
Part Two	Poem	Phillip B. Williams	Bahni Turpin	"Mama, Where You Keep Your Gun?"
Part Three	1699–1704	Brandon R. Byrd	Leslie Odom Jr.	"The Selling of Joseph"
Part Three	1704–1709	Kai Wright	Kai Wright	"The Virginia Slave Codes"
Part Three	1709–1714	Herb Boyd	William DeMerrit	"The Revolt in New York"
Part Three	1714–1719	Sasha Turner	T. L. Thompson	"The Slave Market"
Part Three	1719–1724	Sylviane A. Diouf	Robin Miles	"Maroons and Marronage"
Part Three	1724–1729	Corey D. B. Walker	J. D. Jackson	"The Spirituals"
Part Three	1729–1734	Walter C. Rucker	Zenzi Williams	"African Identities"
Part Three	1734–1739	Brentin Mock	Torian Brackett	"From Fort Mose to Soul City"
Part Three	Poem	Morgan Parker	Morgan Parker	"Before Revolution"
Part Four	1739–1744	Wesley Lowery	Sullivan Jones	"The Stono Rebellion"
Part Four	1744–1749	Nafissa Thompson-Spires	Karen Chilton	"Lucy Terry Prince"
Part Four	1749–1754	Dorothy E. Roberts	Jamal Henderson	"Race and the Enlightenment"
Part Four	1754–1759	Kyle T. Mays	David Sadzin	"Blackness and Indigeneity"
Part Four	1759–1764	Tiya Miles	Kristen Ariza	"One Black Boy: The Great Lakes and the Midwest"
Part Four	1764–1769	Alexis Pauline Gumbs	Shayna Small	"Phillis Wheatley"
Part Four	1769–1774	William J. Barber II	Leonard Dozier	"David George"
Part Four	1774–1779	Martha S. Jones	Danai Gurira	"The American Revolution"
Part Four	Poem	Justin Phillip Reed	Andia Winslow	"Not Without Some Instances of Uncommon Cruelty"
Part Five	1779–1784	Daina Ramey Berry	Dashawn Barnes	"Savannah, Georgia"
Part Five	1784–1789	Donna Brazile	Dominic Hoffman	"The U.S. Constitution"
Part Five	1789–1794	Annette Gordon-Reed	January LaVoy	"Sally Hemings"
Part Five	1794–1799	Deirdre Cooper Owens	Tashi Thomas	"The Fugitive Slave Act"
Part Five	1799–1804	Craig Steven Wilder	Rhett Samuel Price	"Higher Education"
Part Five	1804–1809	Kiese Laymon	Kevin R. Free	"Cotton"
Part Five	1809–1814	Clint Smith	Keith David	"The Louisiana Rebellion"
Part Five	1814–1819	Raquel Willis	Ron Butler	"Queer Sexuality"
Part Five	Poem	Ishmael Reed	Adam Lazarre-White	"Remembering the Albany 3"
Part Six	1819–1824	Robert Jones Jr.	Desmond Manny	"Denmark Vesey"
Part Six	1824–1829	Pamela Newkirk	Anita Welch	"Freedom's Journal"
Part Six	1829–1834	Kathryn Sophia Belle	Marisha Tapera	"Maria Stewart"
Part Six	1834–1839	Eugene Scott	Damian Thompson	"The National Negro Conventions"
Part Six	1839–1844	Allyson Hobbs	Imani Jade Powers	"Racial Passing"
Part Six	1844–1849	Harriet A. Washington	Ethan Herisse	"James McCune Smith, M.D."
Part Six	1849–1854	Mitchell S. Jackson	Dion Graham	"Oregon"
Part Six	1854–1859	john a. powell	Leon Nixon	"Dred Scott"
Part Six	Poem	Donika Kelly	Tashi Thomas	"Compromise"
Part Seven	1859–1864	Adam Serwer	James Fouhey	"Frederick Douglass"
Part Seven	1864–1869	Jamelle Bouie	Prentice Onayemi	"The Civil War"
Part Seven	1869–1874	Michael Harriot	Mirron Willis	"Reconstruction"
Part Seven	1874–1879	Tera W. Hunter	Samira Wiley	"Atlanta"
Part Seven	1879–1884	William A. Darity Jr.	Sean Crisden	"John Wayne Niles"
Part Seven	1884–1889	Kali Nicole Gross	Adenrele Ojo	"Philadelphia"
Part Seven	1889–1894	Crystal N. Feimster	Heather Alicia Simms	"Lynching"
Part Seven	1894–1899	Blair L. M. Kelley	Joniece Abbott-Pratt	"Plessy v. Ferguson"
Part Seven	Poem	Mahogany L. Browne	Mahogany L. Browne	"John Wayne Niles ... .--. . .- -.- ... / - --- Ermias Joseph Asghedom"
Part Eight	1899–1904	Derrick Alridge	Jerome Harmann-Hardeman	"Booker T. Washington"
Part Eight	1904–1909	Howard Bryant	Ryan Vincent Anderson	"Jack Johnson"
Part Eight	1909–1914	Beverly Guy-Sheftall	Robin Eller	"The Black Public Intellectual"
Part Eight	1914–1919	Isabel Wilkerson	Quincy Tyler Bernstine	"The Great Migration"
Part Eight	1919–1924	Michelle Duster	Jade Wheeler	"Red Summer"
Part Eight	1924–1929	Farah Jasmine Griffin	Karen Murray	"The Harlem Renaissance"
Part Eight	1929–1934	Robin D. G. Kelley	Andre Blake	"The Great Depression"
Part Eight	1934–1939	Bernice L. McFadden	Phylicia Rashad	"Zora Neale Hurston"
Part Eight	Poem	Patricia Smith	Patricia Smith	"Coiled and Unleashed"
Part Nine	1939–1944	Chad Williams	Amir Abdullah	"The Black Soldier"
Part Nine	1944–1949	Russell Rickford	Sheryl Mebane	"The Black Left"
Part Nine	1949–1954	Sherrilyn Ifill	Sherrilyn Ifill	"The Road to Brown v. Board of Education"
Part Nine	1954–1959	Imani Perry	Lisa Renee Pitts	"Black Arts"
Part Nine	1959–1964	Charles E. Cobb Jr.	Genesis Oliver	"The Civil Rights Movement"
Part Nine	1964–1969	Peniel Joseph	Dennis Logan	"Black Power"
Part Nine	1969–1974	Keeanga-Yamahtta Taylor	Tovah Ott	"Property"
Part Nine	1974–1979	Barbara Smith	Ella Turenne	"Combahee River Collective"
Part Nine	Poem	Chet'la Sebree	Robin Miles	"And the Record Repeats"
Part Ten	1979–1984	James Forman Jr.	Jesus Martinez	"The War on Drugs"
Part Ten	1984–1989	Bakari Kitwana	Cary Hite	"The Hip-Hop Generation"
Part Ten	1989–1994	Salamishah Tillet	Keylor Leigh	"Anita Hill"
Part Ten	1994–1999	Angela Y. Davis	Angela Y. Davis	"The Crime Bill"
Part Ten	1999–2004	Esther Armah	Joshua David Scarlett	"The Black Immigrant"
Part Ten	2004–2009	Deborah Douglas	Soledad O'Brien	"Hurricane Katrina"
Part Ten	2009–2014	Karine Jean-Pierre	Nicole Lewis	"The Shelby Ruling"
Part Ten	2014–2019	Alicia Garza	Alicia Garza	"Black Lives Matter"
Part Ten	Poem	Joshua Bennett	Joshua Bennett	"American Abecedarian"
Conclusion		Keisha N. Blain	Keisha N. Blain	"Our Ancestors' Wildest Dreams"

== See also ==
- African-American history
- Charleston Syllabus
- How to Be an Antiracist
- The 1619 Project
