= Isabel de Olvera =

Isabel de Olvera was a free woman of mixed racial heritage in the 16th and 17th centuries whose early life details are challenging to discover due to limited documented records. She often referred to herself as mulatta, being the daughter of Hernando, an African man, and Magdalena, an Indian woman. She lived in Querétaro, Mexico, and travelled on the Juan Guerra de Resa expedition to Santa Fe, sent to strengthen the Spanish claim to the colonised province of Santa Fe de Nuevo México. Olvera, the servant of a Spanish woman, filed a remarkable sworn deposition with the alcalde mayor of Querétaro before leaving on the expedition.

== Early life ==
There are limited historical records providing insight into her personal journey. However, Mexico during the 16th century had societal dynamics, specifically for African Americans and mixed-race individuals. During this time Mexico was under Spanish colonial rule and the population consisted of a diverse blend of indigenous peoples, Europeans, and Africans brought through the transatlantic slave trade. Through the colonial period, the concept of race wasn't established the way it is today. Colonial inhabitants frequently refrained from defining race, as it was a concept imposed upon them by the Spanish colonialists. Although the concept of race wasn't definite until the 18th century, colonialists applied a caste system based on origin and nationality which used various terms to describe the inhabitants: Negro (Black) Mulatto (Black and White), Pardo (African ancestry), Chino (African and Asian), Moreno/a (dark-skinned), Mestizo (Black, Indigenous, and White), Lobo or Zambo (Mixed African and Indigenous), and Coyote (Mulatto and Indigenous). The Spaniard colonialists used these classifications to distribute rights and privileges to certain groups while excluding others.

Isabel de Olvera was a mixed-race woman living in Mexico, which often entailed the discrimination and challenges presented by a society shaped by colonial hierarchies. Even with these hardships, Isabel de Olivera crafted distinct narratives, leaving behind a legacy that demonstrates the resilience and complexity of her experiences within the intricate historical context of 16th-century Mexico.

Before Isabel de Olvera went on her expedition to New Mexico she lived in Querétaro, Mexico. During the 16th century, living in Querétaro as an African American or mixed-race woman would have been influenced by the dynamics of Spanish colonization. For someone like Isabel de Olvera, born in the 16th century, her early life would have been intricately connected to these colonial dynamics. Isabel is historically documented to be one of the first Afro-Mexican women to travel to the New World, and likely encountered challenges related to her racial identity and gender. Her early life experiences in Querétaro would have been shaped by the societal norms of the time.

Since not much is known about Isabel's early life, but it is known she lived in Querétaro it could be assumed that since she lived in Mexico during a period marked by Spanish colonization, it is likely that her diet reflected a blend of indigenous and European influences. Staple foods might’ve included dishes like tortillas, and tamales, complemented by native ingredients such as beans, chili peppers, and local fruits. Housing in Querétaro likely varied, from traditional indigenous houses to structures influenced by Spanish architecture. Cultural practices could be a mix of indigenous traditions and newly introduced European customs.

== Journey to Northern New Spain ==
=== 16th- and 17th-century expeditions to Northern New Spain ===
Isabel de Olvera joined Juan Guerra de Resa’s expedition to Northern New Spain in 1600. In the 1500's and 1600's, many expeditions to Northern New Spain were led by Spanish explorers. They often brought servants, soldiers, and their families along with them. These Spanish explorers looked to make their claim to land in the “New World” and find new trade routes and natural resources. As these explorers encountered indigenous people in the lands they were exploring, they were sometimes greeted with fear and violence and other times were idolized and given gifts.

Northern New Spain, which today is the Southwestern United States, has been home to indigenous pueblo people since the thirteenth century. These Pueblo Native Americans are believed to have descended from the Anasazi/Ancestral Pueblo culture. These Spanish conquistadors tried to conquer the land of the pueblo people and convert them to Christianity, resulting in tension and violence between the two groups.

== Journey ==
In 1600, Isabel de Olvera joined an expedition to Northern New Spain, led by Juan Guerra de Resa (also sometimes known as Juan de Ońate), a Mexican conquistador. Little is known about this expedition to Northern New Spain. This was his second trip to New Spain and this time he traveled with about seventy five African soldiers, their mulatto families as well as Isabel de Olvera. Juan Guerra de Resa's expedition to Northern New Spain was not the only one in this region and time period that included Africans. Many of the Africans living in New Spain at this time worked as auxiliaries to Spanish explorers, as it was often easier for them to gain their freedom this way. They were also very involved in the construction of settlements and some were able to secure land of their own. Despite their immense contributions to these expeditions, these Black auxiliaries still had minimal freedom. Although it cannot be confirmed, the Black soldiers on Juan Guerra de Resa's expedition to Northern New Spain likely had similar experiences as other African auxiliaries to Spanish explorers during this time.

Isabel de Olvera joined Juan Guerra de Resa's journey to Northern New Spain, (modern day New Mexico) in 1600. The National Park Service websites says “The Juan Guerra de Resa Expedition of 1600 included African soldiers, their mulatto wives and children, and Isabel de Olvera, a mulatta woman.” She worked as a servant to a Spanish family. The book by Daina Ramey Berry and Kali Nicole Gross, A Black Women's History of the United States says “Also joining her was a mulatto “girl of tender age,” named Ysabel, and a number of Indian women including Juana, Anna, Francisca, Catalina, Augustina, Maria, Francisca, and Beatriz, whom we only know by their first names in ancient records. Mestizo women, such as Magdalena and Ana, accompanied them as well.” Some of these women were traveling with their children and husbands, others used this journey as a chance to leave their husbands. Many of the married women worked as servants or nurses to the explorers. Husbands of these women tried to protect their wives by only sharing minimal information about their identities because of the horror stories of previous expeditions. As a single mulatta woman she was taking on a great deal of risk by joining this expedition. She was at risk of violence, rape, and losing her freedom.

Juan Guerra de Resa’s expedition went through mountains, rivers, and deserts in Mexico and New Spain for about 1,400 miles over a nine to twelve month period. They started in Querétaro, Mexico and most likely traveled to Santa Barbara, Mexico in about three or four months, then to El Paso in about three months, then finally El Paso to Santa Fe, New Spain in about four months. Juan Guerra de Resa had previously traveled in these areas so he knew a shortcut to take through the Chihuahuan Desert that saved them time, but also put them at a higher risk. On Juan Guerra de Resa’s first expedition to New Spain, the crew was without water for a few days. The book by Daina Ramey Berry and Kali Nicole Gross, A Black Women's History of the United States says "We know about these travel conditions through Gaspar Pérex de Villagrá, … who accompanied Onáte and paved the way for others, like Isabel, who came to New Mexico after him." He wrote about the long, treacherous distances they traveled and how they built a large chapel near a river they named “Sacramento” in honor of “the Blessed Sacrament” to rest and pray during their difficult journey. Isabel de Olvera and the rest of the crew likely traveled through similar conditions. These harsh conditions were likely diminishing to the physical and mental wellbeing of the travelers. Juan Guerra de Resa was known to give his fellow travelers pep talks to encourage them to continue even during the most difficult parts of their journey.

== Life in New Mexico ==
Isabel de Olvera's life in New Mexico after this expedition is unknown but if she did end up making it to Santa Fe she would be one of the first free Black women in New Mexico. What is known about Black and Mulatta women in this region from this time, mainly comes from records of baptisms, marriages, deaths, as well as witchcraft court cases. It is thought that these accusations stem from women of color in New Mexico using a form of alternative spiritualistic medicine called curanderos.

== History of Spanish colonization in North America ==
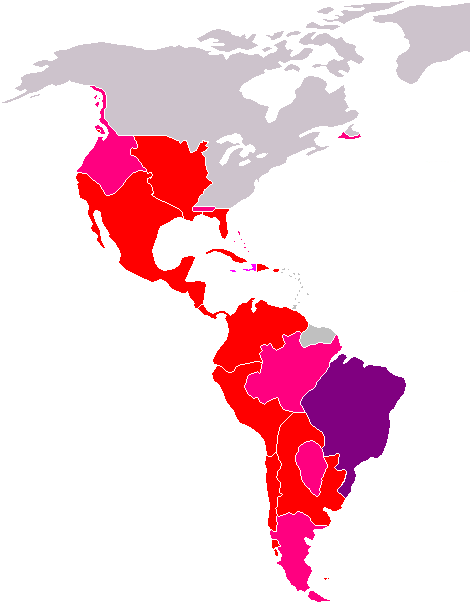
Spanish territories gained in the Americas

The early history of Spanish colonization of North America is often filled with the names of white male conquerors such as "Francisco Vázquez de Coronado, and De Vargas". These men went on expeditions to New Mexico and other North American territories such as Kansas and Santa Fe, exploring the new lands, and making new connections for their colonies. “The Spanish established the first European settlements in the Americas, beginning in the Caribbean and, by 1600, extending throughout Central and South America.” These explorations started the expansion of Spanish and Mexican territory. There is some information about the big Expeditions, led by these well-known Spanish conquerors, but not a lot of content about other people on the expeditions such as families, women, and people of different races. The fact that it was the early 1500s and 1600s also could contribute to the lack of information, but the expeditions and discoveries we do know were very influential to North America settlement.

== Social structures and classes in Spanish culture ==
In Latin American culture, people would use the “term “Mulatto” – Mulato in Spanish – commonly refers to a mixed race ancestry that includes White European and Black African roots." Mexico in the 15th and 16th centuries both had structures and social classes that included enslaved people usually of African or Indigenousdescent. This meant discrimination based on skin tone and race. Mexico was also involved with slave trade with West Africa and greatly depended on them economically. The number of enslaved people increased, as well as the demand for free labor. Being someone of mixed races, like Isabel De-Olvera was not uncommon. Although there is not too much known about Isabel's early life, in The Book, .“A Black Women’s History of the United States” written by Daina Ramey Berry and Kali Nicole Gross says, “Born the daughter of Hernando and African man, and Magdelena, an Indian woman, she had always been free”. It is known that Isabel was a free woman, but it can be assumed she still faced racial discrimination. People of mixed races would also, in a lot of instances, be enslaved no matter their other identities. That is why during the expedition led by Juan Guerra De Rosa to New Mexico, Isabel's role was initially to be a slave until she argued for her freedom.

== Isabel De Olvera's testimony ==
New Mexico, the American state Isabel De Olvera traveled to

“In a deposition made before the governor of her home, Querétaro Mexico, Isabel de Olvera inserted her voice and her story into the historical records of the time.” Isabel presented her case in front of Pedro Lorenzo de Castilla to join the expedition as a free person, not as a slave to other Mexican women on the trip as well as her freedom and protection in the US, considering they enforced slavery on people of African descent such as herself. She presented 3 witnesses a freed black man named Mateo Laines, a woman of mixed race named Anna Verdugo, and an enslaved woman named Santa Maria to support her side of the argument. Some memorable quotes from her testimony were, “I am going on the expedition to New Mexico and have some reason to fear that I may be annoyed by some individual since I am a Mulatta, and it is proper to protect my rights in such an eventuality by an affidavit showing that I am a free woman, unmarried, and the legitimate daughter of Hernando, a Negro, and an Indian named Magdalena.” and ended with the powerful words, 1.“ “I therefore request your grace to accept this affidavit, which shows that I am free and not bound by marriage or slavery. I request that a properly certified and signed copy be given to me to protect my rights and that it carry full legal authority. I demand justice.” Her participation in the expedition was particularly significant because of the environment of a new colony with different rules enforced towards single women of African descent. By demanding her freedom, Isabel assured her safety and rights in the US. She joined the expedition as a servant, not a slave, of a woman, as well as protection and rights from her governor and other members of the expedition.

== Isabel’s testimony’s impact ==
Isabel's whole testimony was written and kept safe as an official, accessible public document, and is one of the earliest records of activism shown by an African women in North American history. Harvest life.org writes, “ It also highlights the legal standing of women in Spanish colonies no matter their legal statuses and heritage.” Not only was Isabel able to be one of the first African Women to travel to New Mexico, but her documents also influenced other people's shared experiences and arguments about their freedoms and rights. The expedition was very successful and allowed the group to gain more resources and connections in the new colony and early North America.. “ She demanded justice and respect for her existence, singleness, freedom, and future. The confidence embedded in her statement remains empowering and inspirational centuries later.”
