= JD Jackson (actor) =

American actor

JD Jackson is an American audiobook narrator, actor, and theater professor. Jackson has won 26 Earphone Awards and 1 Audie Award. In 2020, AudioFile named him a Golden Voice Narrator and two years later Booklist named him a Voice of Choice Narrator.

== Biography ==
Jackson received a Bachelor of Arts in Drama and Speech Communications from Dillard University in 1997. In 2000, he received a Master of Fine Arts in Theater Performance from Temple University.

== Awards and honors ==
=== Awards ===
Year	Title	Award	Result	Ref.
2003	America (2002) by E. R. Frank	Earphone Award	Winner	
2003	Locomotion (2003) by Jacqueline Woodson	Earphone Award	Winner	
2009	Just Another Hero (2009) by Sharon M. Draper	Earphone Award	Winner	
2010	Cemetery Road (2009) by Gar Anthony Haywood	Earphone Award	Winner	
2011	Ghetto Cowboy (2011) by G. Neri	Earphone Award	Winner	
2012	Ghetto Cowboy (2011) by G. Neri	Odyssey Award	Honor	
2012	Malcolm X: By Any Means Necessary (1993) by Walter Dean Myers	Earphone Award	Winner	
2012	What It Was (2012) by George Pelecanos	Earphone Award	Winner	
2014	Citizens Creek (2014) by Lalita Tademy	Earphone Award	Winner	
2014	Revolution (2014) by Deborah Wiles	Earphone Award	Winner	
2015	Gateway to Freedom: The Hidden History of the Underground Railroad (2015) by Eric Foner	Earphone Award	Winner	
2015	Revolution (2014) by Deborah Wiles	Amazing Audiobooks for Young Adults	Top 10	
2015	Revolution (2014) by Deborah Wiles	Audie Award for Distinguished Achievement in Production	Finalist	
2016	Citizens Creek (2014) by Lalita Tademy	Audie Award for Fiction	Finalist	
2017	Bluebird, Bluebird (2017) by Attica Locke	Earphone Award	Winner	
2017	Sting Like a Bee: Muhammad Ali vs. the United States of America, 1966-1971 (2017) by Leigh Montville	Earphone Award	Winner	
2018	The Life and Times of Persimmon Wilson by Nancy Peacock	Audie Award for Fiction	Finalist	
2019	Look Both Ways (2019) by Jason Reynolds	Earphone Award	Winner	
2019	Where Do We Go from Here: Chaos or Community? (1967) by Martin Luther King Jr.	Audie Award for Nonfiction	Finalist	
2020	Beowulf: A New Translation (2020) by Maria Dahvana Headley	Earphone Award	Winner	
2020	A Fool's Errand: Creating the National Museum of African American History and Culture in the Age of Bush, Obama, and Trump (2019) by Lonnie G. Bunch III	Earphone Award	Winner	
2020	His Truth is Marching On: John Lewis and the Power of Hope by Jon Meacham	Earphone Award	Winner	
2020	The Nickel Boys (2019) by Colson Whitehead	Audie Award for Best Male Narrator	Finalist	
2020	The Underground Railroad Records: Narrating the Hardships, Hairbreadth Escapes, and Death Struggles of Slaves in Their Efforts for Freedom (2020) by William Still and edited by Quincy T. Mills, with introduction by Ta-Nehisi Coates	Earphone Award	Winner	
2021	The Anatomy of Desire (2021) by L. R. Dorn	Earphone Award	Winner	
2021	Black Cop's Kid: An Essay (2021) by Kareem Abdul-Jabbar	Earphone Award	Winner	
2021	Black Panther: Tales of Wakanda (2021), edited by Jesse J. Holland	Earphone Award	Winner	
2021	Four Hundred Souls: A Community History of African America, 1619-2019, edited by Ibram X. Kendi and Keisha N. Blain	Earphone Award	Winner	
2021	Hell of a Book (2021) by Jason Mott	Earphone Award	Winner	
2021	His Truth is Marching On: John Lewis and the Power of Hope by Jon Meacham	Audie Award for History or Biography	Winner	
2021	A Little Devil in America: Notes in Praise of Black Performance (2020) by Hanif Abdurraqib	Earphone Award	Winner	
2021	When Ghosts Come Home (2021) by Wiley Cash	Earphone Award	Winner	
2021	When Stars Are Scattered (2020) by Victoria Jamieson and Omar Mohamed	Amazing Audiobooks for Young Adults	Top 10	
2021	When Stars Are Scattered (2020) by Victoria Jamieson and Omar Mohamed	Odyssey Award	Honor	
2022	The Anatomy of Desire (2021) by L. R. Dorn	Audie Award for Multi-Voiced Performance	Finalist	
2022	The Best American Short Stories 2021, edited by Jesmyn Ward and Heidi Pitlor	Audie Award for Short Stories or Collections	Finalist	
2022	Four Hundred Souls: A Community History of African America, 1619-2019, edited by Ibram X. Kendi and Keisha N. Blain	Audie Award for Multi-Voiced Performance	Finalist	
2022	The Last Suspicious Holdout: Stories (2022) by Ladee Hubbard	Earphone Award	Winner	
2022	Listen Mama by M.S.P. Williams	Audie Award for Autobiography or Memoir	Finalist	
2022	The Weight of Blood (2022) by Tiffany D. Jackson	Earphone Award	Winner	

=== Honors ===
In 2020, AudioFile inducted Jackson into their Golden Voice Hall of Fame.

He also narrated two Pulitzer Prize-winning audiobooks, The Tradition by Jericho Brown and The Nickel Boys by Colson Whitehead, as well as Carnegie Medal winner, A Little Devil in America: Notes in Praise of Black Performance by Hanif Abdurraqib.

Year	Title	Honor	Ref.
2005	Battle of Jericho by Sharon M. Draper	Amazing Audiobooks for Young Adults	
2011	Just Another Hero by Sharon Draper	AudioFile Best of Young Adult	
2012	Cemetery Road (2009) by Gar Anthony Haywood	AudioFile Best of Mystery & Suspense	
2012	Ghetto Cowboy (2011) by G. Neri	Amazing Audiobooks for Young Adults	
2012	Ghetto Cowboy (2011) by G. Neri	Notable Children's Recordings	
2012	What It Was (2012) by George Pelecanos	AudioFile Best of Mystery & Suspense	
2013	Crow by Barbara Wright	AudioFile Best of Children	
2013	Malcolm X: By Any Means Necessary (1993) by Walter Dean Myers	AudioFile Best of Young Adult	
2014	Courage Has No Color: The True Story of the Triple Nickles America's First Black Paratroopers by Tanya Lee Stone	Amazing Audiobooks for Young Adults	
2014	Courage Has No Color: The True Story of the Triple Nickles America's First Black Paratroopers by Tanya Lee Stone	Notable Children's Recordings	
2014	Revolution (2014) by Deborah Wiles	Booklist Editors' Choice: Audio for Youth	
2014	Revolution (2014) by Deborah Wiles	Booklist Editor's Top of the List	
2015	Gateway to Freedom: The Hidden History of the Underground Railroad (2015) by Eric Foner	AudioFile Best of History	
2015	The Great War: Stories Inspired by Items from the First World War by Tanya Lee Stone, Marcus Sedgwick, David Almond, Timothée de Fombelle, A.L. Kennedy, Ursula Dubosarsky, Michael Morpurgo, John Boyne, Tracy Chevalier, Sheena Wilkinson, and Adèle Geras	School Library Journal's Top 10 Audiobooks of the Year	
2015	A Nation's Hope: The Story of Boxing Legend Joe Lewis	Notable Children's Videos	
2015	The Madman of Piney Woods	Notable Children's Recordings	
2015	Revolution (2014) by Deborah Wiles	Notable Children's Recordings	
2017	Bluebird, Bluebird (2017) by Attica Locke	AudioFile Best of Mystery & Suspense	
2017	Sting Like a Bee: Muhammad Ali vs. the United States of America, 1966-1971 (2017) by Leigh Montville	AudioFile Best of Biography & History	
2019	Heaven, My Home	AudioFile Best of Mystery & Suspense	
2019	Look Both Ways (2019) by Jason Reynolds	AudioFile Best of Children & Family Listening	
2020	A Fool's Errand: Creating the National Museum of African American History and Culture in the Age of Bush, Obama, and Trump (2019) by Lonnie G. Bunch III	AudioFile Best of Nonfiction & Culture	
2020	When Stars Are Scattered (2020) by Victoria Jamieson and Omar Mohamed	Booklist Editors' Choice: Youth Audio	
2021	The 1619 Project: A New Origin Story (2021) by Nikole Hannah-Jones	Booklist Editors' Choice: Adult Audio	
2021	Four Hundred Souls: A Community History of African America, 1619-2019, edited by Ibram X. Kendi and Keisha N. Blain	AudioFile Best of History & Biography	
2021	His Truth is Marching On	AudioFile Best of History & Biography	
2021	Look Both Ways: A Tale Told in Ten Blocks (2019) by Jason Reynolds	Amazing Audiobooks for Young Adults	
2021	The Trial of the Chicago 7: The Official Transcript,edited by Mark L. Levine, George C. McNamee, and Daniel Greenberg	Listen List	
2021	When Stars Are Scattered (2020) by Victoria Jamieson and Omar Mohamed	Notable Children's Recordings	

== Filmography ==
Year	Title	Role	Note
1997	The Big Easy	Jasper Goodwin	1 episode: End of the World
2001	Diary of a City Priest	Kurt	
2002	As If	Chris	2 episodes: Episode 1.2; Episode 1.3
2002	Third Watch	Latrell Griffith	2 episodes: Lights Up; Blackout
2003	Hack	Skeeter D	1 episode: Collateral Damage
2003	Queens Supreme	ADA Barney Broomfield	1 episode: Let's Make a Deal
2003	Whoopi	Security Guard #2	1 episode: Sticky Fingers
2005	Law & Order	Lenny Thorne	1 episode: Locomotion
2006	Sherrybaby	Job Trainer	Uncredited
2006	Lucky Number Slevin	Mugger	
2008	Cold Play	Detective Sparks	
2008	ER	Chuck Holmes	1 episode: Parental Guidance
2010	House	Ronald Westbrook	1 episode: 5 to 9
2012	Acts the 3-Man Show	Peter	
2019	Granddaddy's Turn: A Journey to the Ballot Box	Narrator	
2022	Keeping the City Going		
