= Shennette Garrett-Scott =

American historian

Shennette Monique Garrett-Scott is an American historian. She specializes in African-American women in economic history and wrote the 2019 book Banking on Freedom: Black Women in U.S. Finance Before the New Deal. She has been a professor at the University of Mississippi, Texas A&M University, and Tulane University.

== Biography ==
Shennette Garrett-Scott originally wanted to be a high school teacher but decided to earn a Ph.D. and teach at the college level after learning she wouldn't be able to teach Black history in public school. After obtaining her BA in Historical Studies at the University of Texas at Dallas in 2004, she moved to the University of Texas at Austin, where she obtained her MA in American History and eventually her PhD in American History, both in 2006 and 2011. Her dissertation, Daughters of Ruth: Enterprising Black Women in Insurance in the New South, 1890s to 1930s, was supervised by Juliet E. K. Walker.

After spending a year in Case Western Reserve University as a postdoctoral fellow (2012-2013), she moved to the University of Mississippi, where she was Assistant Professor in History and African American Studies until she was promoted to Associate Professor in 2019. She moved to Texas A&M University in 2021 and remained Associate Professor. She also works at the Tulane University School of Liberal Arts as Associate Professor of History and Africana Studies and Paul and Debra Gibbons Professor.

As an academic, she specializes in African-American women in economic history. She won the 2012 H. Bailey Carroll Award for Best Article in the Southwestern Historical Quarterly from the Texas State Historical Association. In 2019, she published Banking on Freedom: Black Women in U.S. Finance Before the New Deal, a book on African-American women in finance during the late 19th century and early 20th century; she won the 2018 Darlene Clark Hine Award, the 2019 Letitia Woods Brown Book Award from the Association of Black Women Historians, and the 2020 Bennett H. Wall Award from the Southern Historical Society for said book. She has also worked on public broadcasting documentaries, appearing on PBS's Boss: The Black Experience in Business and working as a consultant for a Mississippi Public Broadcasting documentary on women's suffrage. She has also served as the National Vice Director of the Association of Black Women Historians.

She lives in Houston. She and her husband have three children. Outside of academia, she assisted in the 2012 landmark designation of the Grand Court Order of Calanthe and has worked on the preservation of its archives after its 2020 receivership.

== Publications ==
- Banking on Freedom: Black Women in U.S. Finance Before the New Deal (2019)
