= ABWH =

ABWH may refer to:

- Anderson Bruford Wakeman Howe, a progressive rock group
- Association of Black Women Historians
