= Association of Black Women Historians =

Professional association located in the United States

- Formation: October 1979; 47 years ago
- Founders: Rosalyn Terborg-Penn Eleanor Smith Elizabeth Parker
- Type: Professional association
- Tax ID no.: 52-1305573
- Headquarters: Washington, D.C., United States
- Official language: English
- National Director: Erica Armstrong Dunbar
- National Vice Director: Shennette Garrett-Scott
- Secretary: Jessica Klanderud
- Treasurer: Le'Trice Donaldson
- Website: abwh.org

The Association of Black Women Historians (ABWH) is a non-profit professional association based in Washington, D.C., in the United States. The organization was developed in 1977 and formally founded in 1979.

== History ==
The Association of Black Women Historians was conceived in 1977 by three Black women historians: Elizabeth Parker, Eleanor Smith, and Rosalyn Terborg-Penn. The organization's constitution outlines four goals: establish a network among the membership, promote Black women in the profession, disseminate information about opportunities in the field, and suggest research topics and repositories.

Before the organization was launched in late 1979 in New York, meetings were held across the United States in Cincinnati, California, and Massachusetts, where the women established its framework. A committee was elected to name the organization as well as to produce a newsletter, Truth, named after the Black woman abolitionist Sojourner Truth. The first members of the executive committee were Darlene Clark Hine, Rosalyn Terborg-Penn, Janice Sumler-Lewis, Bettye J. Gardner, Sharon Harley, Cheryl Johnson, Juanita Moore, Sylvia M. Jacobs, Maria A. Brown, and Cynthia Neverdon-Morton.

The organization has held research conferences and annual luncheons, and published an anthology to commemorate the 20th anniversary of its founding. Its first research conference, at Howard University in 1983, was titled "Women in the African Diaspora: An Interdisciplinary Perspective". The first luncheon, in 1981, featured keynote speakers and helped raise funds for the group. The keynote speakers included Nell Irvin Painter, Elizabeth Clarke Lewis, and Mary Frances Berry. In 1992, brief remarks were given by then presidential candidate Bill Clinton.

The Association of Black Women Historians continues to hold annual its annual luncheon, and has published two books: In Spite of the Double Drawbacks: African American Women in History and Culture and The Truth Worth of Race: African American Women and the Struggle for Freedom. Erica Armstrong Dunbar is the current national director.

In 2012, ABWH published a statement about the film The Help, stating that the film "distorts, ignores, and trivializes the experiences of black domestic workers."

== Current leadership ==
The current executive council members are: Charisse Burden Stelly- Parliamentarian, Sheena Harris-Membership Director, Adam McNeil-Social Media Director, Cherisse Jones Branch-Southern Regional Director, Siobhan Carter-David-Eastern Regional Director, Erica Ball-Far Western Region Director, Elizabeth Todd-Breland-Midwestern Regional Director, Kali Gross-Creative Productions Director (ABWH-TV), Charlene Fletcher-National Publications Director, and Tianna Wilson-Graduate Student Representative.

== Awards ==
The Association of Black Women Historians honors work that women of African descent are doing in the community based on historical issues. They tend to acknowledge newer people in the history field and not only experts. A publication award is tilted Letitia Woods Brown Memorial Publication Award, and there are multiple "Awards for Academics in the History Field".

- Lillian Hornsby Memorial Award
- Drusilla Dunjee Houston Award
- Rosalyn Terborg-Penn Junior Faculty Award
- Lorraine Anderson Williams Leadership Award
