= J. D. Jackson =

J.D. Jackson may refer to:

- John David Jackson (physicist) (1925–2016), Canadian–American physics professor emeritus at the University of California, Berkeley and a faculty senior scientist emeritus at Lawrence Berkeley National Laboratory
- John David Jackson (boxer) (born 1963), American former professional boxer who competed from 1984 to 1999, and currently works as a boxing trainer
- J. D. Jackson (basketball) (born 1969), French basketball coach
- JD Jackson (actor), American actor and audiobook narrator
