= Estelle Freedman =

American historian

Estelle B. Freedman (born 1947) is an American historian. She is the Edgar E. Robinson Professor Emeritus in U.S. History at Stanford University. She received her Bachelor of Arts degree from Barnard College in 1969 and her Master of Arts (1972) and PhD (1976) in history from Columbia University. She taught at Stanford University from 1976 to 2021 and is a co-founder of the Program in Feminist Studies. Her research has explored the history of women and social reform, including feminism and women's prison reform, as well as the history of sexuality, including the history of sexual violence.

== Honors and awards ==
Freedman is the recipient of four teaching awards at Stanford as well as the Nancy Lyman Roelker Mentorship Award for graduate mentorship from the American Historical Association and the Millicent McIntosh Award for Feminism from Barnard College. She has received numerous research fellowships, including grants from the National Endowment for the Humanities, the American Council of Learned Societies, and the John Simon Guggenheim Memorial Foundation. She has been a fellow at the Center for Advanced Study in the Behavioral Sciences and at the Stanford Humanities Center.

Her first book, Their Sisters' Keepers, received the Alice and Edith Hamilton Prize for best scholarly manuscript on women from the University of Michigan in 1978 and was published in 1981. She has won the Frances Richardson Keller-Sierra Prize from the Western Association of Women Historians twice: in 1997 for Maternal Justice and in 2014 for Redefining Rape. Redefining Rape also won the 2014 Darlene Clark Hine Award from the Organization of American Historians and the 2014 Emily Toth Award from the Popular Culture Association and American Culture Association.

Her book My Desire for History, co-edited with John D'Emilio, received the 2013 John Boswell Prize from the Committee on LGBT History of the American Historical Association. Her earlier co-authored book with D'Emilio, Intimate Matters: A History of Sexuality in America, was cited by Justice Anthony Kennedy in his 2003 opinion for Lawrence v. Texas, with which the American Supreme Court overturned all remaining anti-sodomy laws.

== Works ==
- Their Sisters' Keepers: Women's Prison Reform in America, 1830-1930 (Ann Arbor: The University of Michigan Press, 1981). ISBN 9780472080526
- Associate editor (with Barbara C. Gelpi and Marilyn Yalom), Victorian Women: A Documentary Account of Women's Lives in Nineteenth-Century England, France and the United States, eds. Erna O. Hellerstein, Leslie P. Hume, and Karen Offen (Stanford University Press, 1981). ISBN 9780804710961
- Editor (with Barbara C. Gelpi, Susan L. Johnson, and Kathleen M. Weston), The Lesbian Issue: Essays From Signs (University of Chicago Press, 1985). ISBN 9780226261522
- Intimate Matters: A History of Sexuality in America (with John D'Emilio) (New York: Harper and Row, 1988; 3rd ed., University of Chicago Press, 2012). ISBN 9780226923802
- Maternal Justice: Miriam Van Waters and the Female Reform Tradition (University of Chicago Press, 1996). ISBN 9780226261508
- No Turning Back: The History of Feminism and the Future of Women (New York: Ballantine Books, 2002). ISBN 9780345450531
- Feminism, Sexuality, and Politics: Essays by Estelle Freedman (University of North Carolina Press, 2006). ISBN 9780807856949
- The Essential Feminist Reader (New York: The Modern Library, 2007). ISBN 9780812974607
- Editor (with John D'Emilio), My Desire for History: Essays on Gay, Community, and Labor History, by Allan Bérubé (University of North Carolina Press, 2011). ISBN 9780807871959
- Foreword and consulting editor (with John D'Emilio), Documenting Intimate Matters: Primary Sources for the a History of Sexuality in America, ed. Thomas A. Foster (University of Chicago Press, 2012). ISBN 9780226257471
- Redefining Rape: Sexual Violence in the Era of Suffrage and Segregation (Harvard University Press, 2013). ISBN 9780674724846
