= Charleston Syllabus =

Social media activism movement

#CharlestonSyllabus (Charleston Syllabus) is a Twitter movement and crowdsourced syllabus using the hashtag #CharlestonSyllabus to compile a list of reading recommendations relating to the history of racial violence in the United States. It was created in response to the race-motivated violence in Charleston, South Carolina, on the evening of June 17, 2015, when Dylann Roof opened fire during a Bible study session at Emanuel African Methodist Episcopal Church, killing nine people.

These texts provide information about racial violence in the United States and provide background on the history of race relations in South Carolina in particular and the United States in general. They also offer education on race, racial identities, global white supremacy and black resistance. Several of the suggested readings shed light on race and racism on a global scale. On June 23, 2015, NPR's Renée Montagne reported on Morning Edition that "academics, librarians and history students have been rallying around the hashtag Charleston Syllabus, suggesting readings that might help inform the public of some of the city's history."

== Background ==
Twitter campaigns utilizing hashtags to generate crowdsourced lists of information sources widely excluded from academic canons emerged throughout 2014 and 2015. The most notable example of this trend is the #FergusonSyllabus, created by Georgetown University Professor Marcia Chatelain in the aftermath of the Ferguson uprising.

The #CharlestonSyllabus campaign was the brainchild of Chad Williams, Associate Professor of African and Afro-American Studies at Brandeis University. The concept came from a tweet of his: "Lots of ignorance running rampant. Folks need a #CharlestonSyllabus." Williams later stated that Roof's killing spree brought national attention to the country's history of racial injustice.

Historians Keisha N. Blain, Kidada Williams, and others helped to circulate the hashtag and #CharlestonSyllabus started trending on Twitter by the evening of June 19, 2015. With the assistance of librarians Melissa Morrone, Ryan P. Randall, and Cecily Walker, Blain compiled and organized the reading list on the website of the African American Intellectual History Society (AAIHS).

Within the first day of use, the hashtag generated approximately 10,000 tweets. Librarians across the nation assisted in culling and categorizing suggestions made via Twitter, also tagging the entries in WorldCat, a web resource for locating materials at nearby libraries, on the AAIHS website. More than 115,000 visitors have accessed the list and several libraries across the country have featured #Charlestonsyllabus displays. Since its debut, #Charlestonsyllabus has been featured on major news outlets including BBC, PBS, NPR, LA Times, New York Times, and the Chronicle of Higher Education.

Chad Williams, Kidada Williams, and Keisha N. Blain recently edited a book based on the syllabus entitled Charleston Syllabus: Readings on Race, Racism, and Racial Violence (University of Georgia Press, 2016).

=== Twitter Historians ===
The emergence of academic crowdsourcing on Twitter can, in large part, be contributed to the #Twitterstorians and #BLKTwitterstorians hashtag trends.

In February 2014, the Pew Research Center defined six different kinds of network crowds, which they called "conversational archetypes", on Twitter, using NodeXL. The Twitterstorians channel is what the research defines as a "tight crowd network".

== See also ==
- Black Women Syllabus
