= Black Women Syllabus =

Twitter movement promoting readings about Black women

#BlkWomenSyllabus (Black Women Syllabus), is a Twitter movement using the hashtags #blkwomensyllabus or #blackwomensyllabus to compile a list of recommendations for readings about black women. Imani Brammer at Essence Magazine has described it as "a reading list to empower Black women", and according to the blog For Harriet, "the hashtag was initiated by Dr. Daina Ramey Berry and...Scholars, historians, writers, editors and more have contributed to the growing trend."

Black Enterprise stated that movement "sparked initiatives of female empowerment." It was created in response to violence toward women of color by United States police and is a part of the larger movement Black Twitter.

== Background ==
The Black women syllabus is part of a larger effort by scholars to make widely available information often missing in higher education. The best-known example of this is Melissa Harris-Perry's Black Feminism Syllabus. Similar to other hashtag campaigns on Twitter, such as the #FergusonSyllabus, #SayHerNameSyllabus, and #CharlestonSyllabus, #blackwomensyllabus is a crowd-sourced list of reading recommendations by Twitter users, specifically focused on articles, essays, and books about women of color.

The hashtag began when the historian Daina Ramey Berry, PhD tweeted on August 11 "given #CharnesiaCorley time 4 #blkwomensyllabus...". Charnesia Corley, a 21-year-old black female Texas resident, was pulled over at a Texaco gas station on June 21, 2015, accused of running a stop sign. After the deputy allegedly smelled marijuana coming from Corley's car, the woman was forced to remove her clothing, bend over and later was held face down to the ground as police officers probed her vagina while forcing her legs open. Corley told Huffington Post, "I'm traumatized... It was humiliating. I feel like the law is supposed to protect you and not do this. I just don't feel safe anymore. My self-esteem has literally dropped and I can't even step out and be seen because I feel so embarrassed."

Though the incident in Texas with Charnesia Corley was the stated impetus for the #blackwomensyllabus campaign, other instances of police brutally against women have added to the momentum toward this Twitter movement, such as the death of Sandra Bland, found dead in a jail cell also in Texas, on July 13, 2015, after being pulled over by a white police officer for a traffic violation.
