= Almost Astronauts =

2009 nonfiction book by Tanya Lee Stone

Almost Astronauts: 13 Women Who Dared to Dream
- Author: Tanya Lee Stone
- Language: English
- Subject: Mercury 13
- Genre: Nonfiction
- Publisher: Candlewick Press
- Publication date: 2009
- Publication place: USA
- Media type: Print, Audio
- Pages: 144
- ISBN: 9780763636111

Almost Astronauts: 13 Women Who Dared to Dream is a nonfiction children's book by Tanya Lee Stone, originally published February 24, 2009 by Candlewick Press, then republished September 27, 2011. The book tells the story of the Mercury 13 women, who, in 1958, joined NASA and completed testing to become astronauts.

The book won the Bank Street College Flora Stieglitz Straus Award and Robert F. Sibert Informational Book Medal.

== Reception ==
Almost Astronauts received a starred review from Kirkus, as well as positive reviews from Booklist, The New York Times Book Review, The Bulletin of the Center for Children's Books, and Publishers Weekly.

Kirkus wrote, "The author offers great insight into how deeply ingrained sexism was in American society and its institutions. Handsomely illustrated with photographs, this empowering story will leave readers inspired." Publishers Weekly said, "Readers with an interest in history and in women's struggle for equality will undoubtedly be moved." Speaking for The Bulletin, Elizabeth Bush said, "Readers prone to outrage over civil rights denied can plan on losing plenty of sleep over this one."

The audiobook, narrated by Susan Ericksen, received a positive review from Booklist.

Awards and honors for Almost Astronauts
Year	Award/Honor	Result	Ref.
2009	Boston Globe-Horn Book Award for Nonfiction	Honor	
2009	Smithsonian Notable Books for Children	Selection	
2010	Amelia Bloomer List	Selection	
2010	Bank Street College Flora Stieglitz Straus Award	Winner	
2010	Cooperative Children's Book Center Choices	Selection	
2010	Jane Addams Children's Book Award for Older Children	Honor	
2010	NCTE Orbis Pictus Award	Honor	
2010	NCSS Notable Social Studies Tradebooks for Young People	Selection	
2010	NSTA Outstanding Science Trade Books for Students K–12	Top Choice	
2010	Robert F. Sibert Informational Book Medal	Winner	
2010	RUSA Notable Children's Books for Older Readers	Selection	
2010	YALSA Excellence in Nonfiction for Young Adults	Finalist	
2010	YALSA Nonfiction and Morris Book Trailer Contest	Finalist	
2010	YALSA Best Books for Young Adults	Selection	
