= Culture of dissemblance =

Type of cult

"Culture of dissemblance" describes a "cult of secrecy" practiced by black women in the Reconstruction era American Middle West to "protect the sanctity of inner aspects of their lives." The term was coined by Darlene Clark Hine

Though sometimes linked to assimilation, the culture of dissemblance is different in that it was mainly used for black women to hide their sexualities and present a nonsexual image to the world in order to protect themselves. Researchers claim that organizations such as The National Association of Colored Women, institutionalized cultural dissemblance as they sought to destroy what was perceived as harmful or negative depictions of black women's sexuality. Because black women did not have the social, political, or economic means to change or improve the dominant ideologies of the era, "it was imperative that they collectively create alternative self-images and shield from scrutiny these private, empowering definitions of self."

"Culture of dissemblance" has also been used to describe contemporary behaviors. In the aftermath of Hurricane Katrina, many black women were thrust into chaotic atmospheres, and were "exposed emotionally, physically, and sexually in ways largely undocumented." Because of this, they were forced to create a public and private persona to reassure their children and survive in the toxic environment.
