= A Bad Boy Can Be Good For a Girl =

2006 novel by Tanya Lee Stone

- Author: Tanya Lee Stone
- Cover artist: Ghost
- Language: English
- Genre: romance, poetry
- Publisher: Random House
- Publication date: 2006
- Publication place: USA
- Media type: Print (Paperback)
- Pages: 221

A Bad Boy Can Be Good For A Girl is the first novel by Tanya Lee Stone and written in a poetry-format. It follows the story of three girls who fall for the same bad boy intent on seducing every girl in school.

== Plot ==
Josie is thrilled when TL notices her across the dance floor because of her "couldn't care less" act. Although refusing to at first, she begins ignoring her best friends, Kim and Caroline, but never gives them the cold shoulder. She's a freshman and, despite some close encounters, refuses to give up her virginity to him. She overhears a conversation between him and a friend of his about how she won't put out, and he breaks up with her later. She writes about him in Forever..., a book in the library, and is the "fearless ringleader."

Nicolette chooses to ignore Josie's warnings and approaches TL, who asks her out. She considers herself a "loner" and "puts out" almost immediately, believing she has fallen in love. She is considered a "whore" around school. She is very proud, but heartbroken when she discovers he took another girl, Aviva, to a party. Furious, she eventually checks out Forever..., reads Josie's notes and then befriends her.

Aviva is approached by TL in biology, when he needs help. They begin a fun-loving relationship and she overhears him talking to a friend about how she might be different but she might not be. She eventually does sleep with him, and says she loves him, causing him to break up with her. Kristen tries to apologize, but she doesn't want to hear it.

== Reception ==
Reviews for A Bad Boy Can Be Good For a Girl were mostly positive, with Kirkus Reviews panning the book while the Kansas City Star gave a positive rating. The English Journal praised the book, recommending it to educators as a summer reading book for their students. The School Library Journal cited the free verse as a highlight of the book, naming A Bad Boy Can Be Good For a Girl its "Book of the Week" in January 2006.

A Bad Boy Can Be Good For a Girl landed on the American Library Association's Top 10 Banned Books List in 2013 because of its inclusion of drugs, alcohol, and smoking; nudity, offensive language, as well as its sexually explicit content.

== Characters ==
- Josie: a level-headed freshman and the only one of the three to not give in to TL's temptations. She is the ring-leader, popular, and very gathered together and in-control.
- Nicolette: a self-centred "whore" who doesn't believe Josie's claims. She loses her virginity in his car.
- Aviva: a smart girl who plays the guitar and writes lyrics on TL. She loses her virginity in her room, and is very naive.
- Kristen: the school's "Queen Bee" who wants to befriend Aviva but doesn't like Nicolette. and also her boyfriend
