= Rosalyn Terborg-Penn =

American historian (1941–2018)

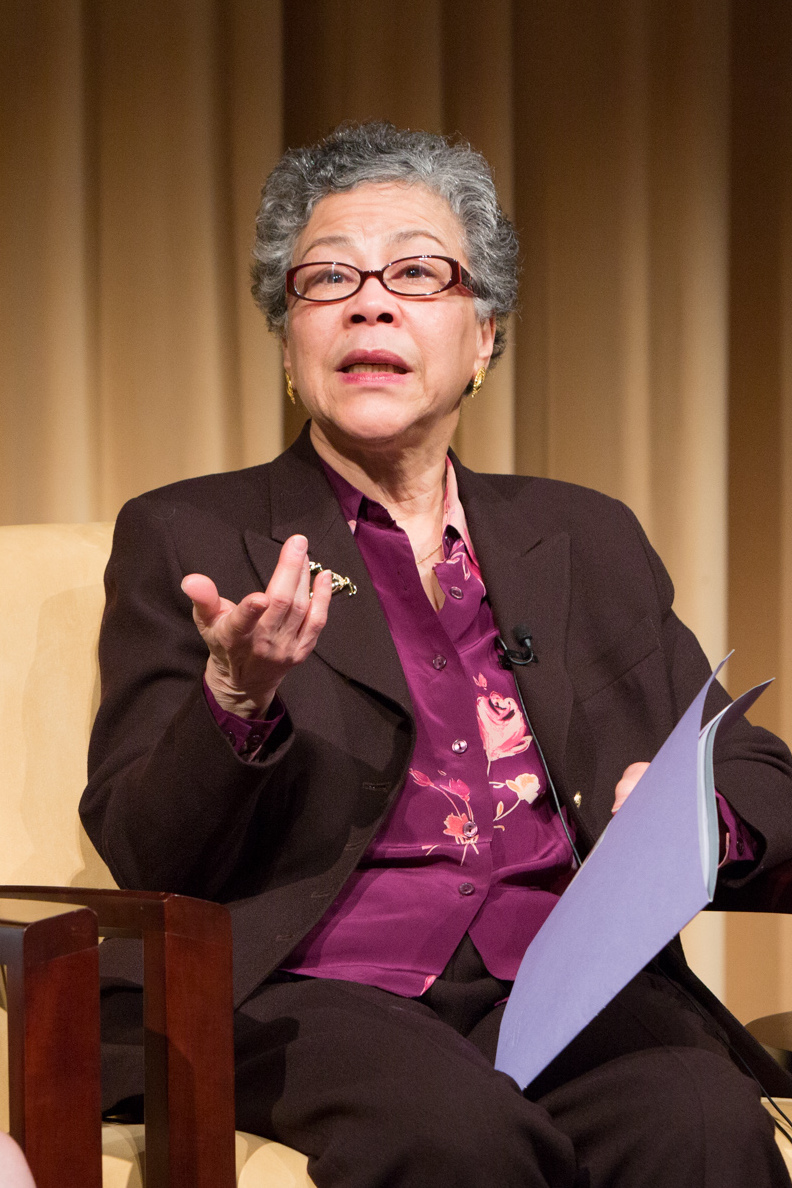
- Terborg-Penn at the U.S. National Archives in 2015
- Born: October 22, 1941; Brooklyn, New York, U.S.
- Died: December 25, 2018 (aged 77); Columbia, Maryland, U.S.

Academic background
- Education: John Adams High School
- Alma mater: Queens College, City University of New York; George Washington University; Howard University

Academic work
- Discipline: Historian

Rosalyn Terborg-Penn (October 22, 1941 – December 25, 2018) was an American professor of history and author. Terborg-Penn specialized in African-American history and black women's history. Her book African American Women in the Struggle for the Vote, 1850–1920 was a ground-breaking work that recovered the histories of black women in the women's suffrage movement in the United States. She was a faculty member of Morgan State University.

== Early life and education ==
Born Rosalyn Marian Terborg in Brooklyn, New York. Her mother Jeanne Terborg (née Van Horn; 1916–2007) was a clerical worker from Indianapolis, and her father Jacques A. Terborg (d. 1997) was a Suriname-born jazz musician. In 1951, her family moved to Queens, where she graduated from John Adams High School in 1959. In 1963, she received a degree in history from Queens College, City University of New York. Terborg-Penn moved to Washington, D.C., earning her master's degree in United States diplomatic history from the George Washington University. Terborg-Penn then obtained her Ph.D. from Howard University in African-American history before 1965.

=== Early activism ===
While at Queens College, she was a charter of the college's NAACP chapter. Terborg-Penn headed a protest on campus when the school would not let Malcolm X speak on campus. She also organized student road trips, including a trip to Prince Edward County in Virginia, where schools were closed by anti-racial integration school officials. While there, Terborg-Penn and other students taught black students. Upon moving to Washington, D.C. to attend The George Washington University, she joined the D.C. Students For Civil Rights group who lobbied for the Civil Rights Act of 1964.

== Career ==
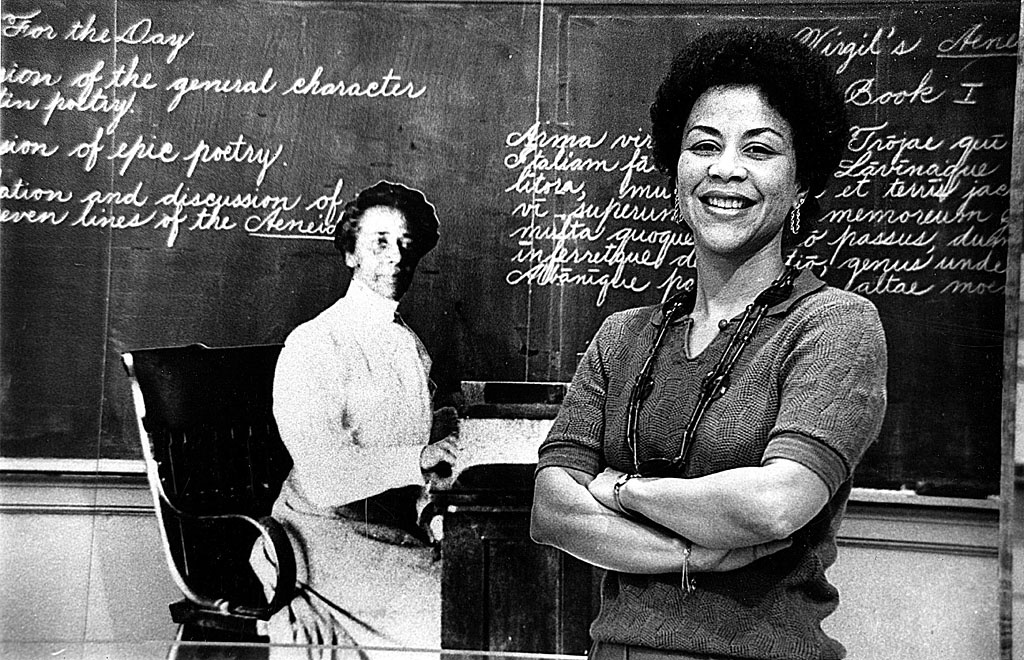
Terborg-Penn in front of the Anna J. Cooper exhibit at the Anacostia Neighborhood Museum, 1985

In 1969, Terborg-Penn began teaching at Morgan State University (MSU). She developed the first Ph.D. program at MSU for history students. She also was a faculty member at the University of Maryland, Baltimore and Howard Community College. In 1977 she co-founded the Association of Black Women Historians and served as the organization's first national director.

In 1998, she published African American Women in the Struggle for the Vote, 1850–1920. The work critiqued the received history of the women's suffrage in the United States for having erased the contributions of black women, and identified more than 120 black women that had played roles in the fight for the vote but had been given little recognition. The book argued that, as the goals of black activists diverged from their white counterparts over issues of racial oppression, history was written with white women at the center. The work is considered a seminal work in African-American women's history.

== Notable works ==
- African American Women in the Struggle for the Vote, 1850-1920. Indiana University Press. 1998. ISBN 0-253-21176-X.
- Sharon Harley; Rosalyn Terborg-Penn (1997). The Afro-American Woman: Struggles and Images. Black Classic Press. ISBN 978-1-57478-026-0.
- Terborg-Penn, Rosalyn and Andrea Benton Rushing. Women in Africa and the African Diaspora: A Reader. Washington: Howard University Press (1997). ISBN 0882581945
- Robert L. Harris; Rosalyn Terborg-Penn (August 13, 2013). The Columbia Guide to African American History Since 1939. Columbia University Press. pp. 16–. ISBN 978-0-231-51087-5.
