= Franchise: The Golden Arches in Black America =

Book by Marcia Chatelain

- First edition
- Author: Marcia Chatelain
- Language: English
- Subject: History of McDonald's relationship with African Americans
- Genre: Non-fiction; History
- Published: January 7, 2020
- Publisher: Liveright
- Publication place: United States
- Pages: 336
- Awards: Pulitzer Prize for History
- ISBN: 9781631493959

Franchise: The Golden Arches in Black America is a book by Marcia Chatelain. Chatelain was awarded the 2021 Pulitzer Prize for History and the 2022 James Beard Award for Writing for this book. She was the first black woman to win the latter award. The book's subject is the relationship between McDonald's restaurants and African American communities.
