= Robert Jones Jr. =

American author

Robert Jones Jr. is an American author who is known for his 2021 debut novel The Prophets which was a finalist for the 2021 National Book Award for Fiction and won the 2022 Edmund White Award. Jones was previously known by his pen name "Son of Baldwin" (referencing author James Baldwin, whom Jones considers an inspiration). Beginning in 2008, he had contributed to his blog, also called Son of Baldwin, in which he discussed topics of race, sexuality, gender and disability. In 2022, Jones retired the Son of Baldwin blog and social media community. Jones's short story "Freedom Is Not for Myself Alone" was included in the anthology The 1619 Project: A New Origin Story.

== Early life ==
Jones grew up in Brooklyn, New York City and attended Brooklyn College. He had been developing his first manuscript, The Prophets, for 13 years when he was discovered by author Kiese Laymon, who helped him publish the work.

== Career ==
The Prophets tells the story of two enslaved men, Samuel and Isaiah, who form a loving relationship on a cotton plantation in Mississippi known as Empty. Their relationship is strained as another slave, Amos, discovers their relationship and condemns it as un-natural. Amos appeals to the slaveowner Paul to allow him to act as a preacher to the plantation so that he can spread the word of God to make the slaves more servile. Amos hopes to win the favor of Paul so that he may be allowed to marry. Amos turns the plantation against Samuel and Isaiah by teaching them that homosexuality is a sin and should be shunned. To further add to their distress, Samuel and Isaiah are expected by their owner to impregnate the female slaves to assist in growth of the plantation. Other times throughout the novel, the narrative travels to the past to tell the stories of the slaves' ancestors in Africa.

The work was named one of the must-read books of 2021 by Time. In The New York Times Book Review, poet Danez Smith described the novel as "an often lyrical and rebellious love story embedded within a tender call-out to Black readers, reaching across time and form to shake something old, mighty in the blood." In USA Today, in a four out of four star review, Darryl Robertson wrote: "The Prophets is packed with otherworldly and supremely artful storytelling, and readers will surely get lost in a radiant romance. But most important, Jones adds to the growing body of literature that reimagines slavery." Writing for The New Yorker in a negative review, Lauren Michele Jackson stated that the characters describe their surroundings and circumstances using similar language, so it is difficult to discern who is speaking. Regarding the novel's metaphorical lyrical style, Jackson stated: "But tones of transcendence and glory have a way of obstructing interiority, the lifeblood of the novel". Jackson concluded that the novel "is preoccupied with sifting the sands of time, searching for an authenticity that can’t be retrieved, at the expense of uncovering the connections between people." Writing for The Guardian, Holly Williams stated that the work was "an outstanding novel, delivering tender, close-up intimacy, but also a great sweep of history." But Williams also stated the metaphors sometimes distracted from the narrative.

In 2023, The New York Times listed The Prophets as one of "The 25 Most Influential Works of Postwar Queer Literature".

== Social media interaction ==
Jones posted a tweet on August 18, 2015, that has subsequently (and often) been wrongly attributed to James Baldwin, likely because of the tweet's association with Jones's previous pen name "Son of Baldwin". The text read:

We can disagree and still love each other unless your disagreement is rooted in my oppression and denial of my humanity and right to exist.

Snopes eventually clarified this misattribution on its website in 2024.

== Personal life ==
Jones is married to his longtime partner, attorney Adrian Techeira, and currently writes the newsletter Witness.

== Bibliography ==
=== Novels ===
- The Prophets (hardcover 1st ed.). G. P. Putnam's Sons. 2021. ISBN 9780593085691.

=== Short fiction ===
- Jones, Robert (2021). "Freedom Is Not for Myself Alone". In Hannah-Jones, Nikole (ed.). The 1619 Project: A New Origin Story (hardcover 1st ed.). One World. ISBN 9780593230596.

=== Non-fiction ===
- Jones, Robert (2021). "Denmark Vesey". In Kendi, Ibram X.; Blain, Keisha N. (eds.). Four Hundred Souls (hardcover 1st ed.). One World. ISBN 9780593449349.
