= Ferguson Syllabus =

In the wake of civil unrest and protests in Ferguson, Missouri, Professor Marcia Chatelain of Georgetown University created the #FergusonSyllabus Twitter campaign. Ferguson syllabus provides a space for educators to discuss integrating the events that happened in Ferguson into classrooms.

== Background ==
On August 9, 2014 an unarmed Black teenager, Michael Brown, was fatally shot by white police officer Darren Wilson in Ferguson, Missouri. The disputed details of Brown's death sparked protests and civil unrest in Ferguson, across the United States, and internationally. The dispute arose from dueling narratives of why and how the altercation occurred. Wilson and eyewitnesses presented different accounts of what happened. This confusion, along with aggressive policing following Brown's death, led to heated debate and examination of the relationship between policing practices and communities of color. The protests and civil unrest continued on November 24, 2014 after a St. Louis grand jury failed to indict Wilson on criminal charges. After the verdict was announced, protests flared in Ferguson and in nearly every major U.S. city. On November 29, 2014, Wilson resigned from the Ferguson Police Department with no severance or benefits. Over $500,000 was raised by Wilson's supporters via crowdfunding.

On March 4, 2015 the United States Department of Justice announced the findings of its two civil rights investigations into the Ferguson Police Department. The Justice Department found that the Ferguson Police Department "engaged in a pattern or practice of conduct that violates the First, Fourth, and 14th Amendments of the Constitution". In Ferguson—a city with a population of 21,000–16,000 people have outstanding arrest warrants, meaning that they are currently actively wanted by the police. The Justice Department also stated, "That the evidence examined in its independent, federal investigation into the fatal shooting of Michael Brown does not support federal civil rights charges against Ferguson Police Officer Darren Wilson."

== Purpose ==
Ferguson Syllabus is a crowdsourced syllabus about race, African-American history, civil rights, and policing. It was created as a way to integrate conversations of what happened in Ferguson into classrooms. Marcia Chatelain, an assistant professor of history at Georgetown University, created the hashtag #FergusonSyllabus so that educators could have a platform to discuss the national crisis in Ferguson, Missouri. Chatelain describes it as, “What emerged was a small call for community across the sometimes impersonal and expansive digital world.”

Chatelain contacted her colleagues in her discipline to use Twitter as a mechanism to recommend texts, collaborate on conversation starters, and inspire dialogue about some aspect of the Ferguson events. Chatelain argues, “The academy has never owned movements, and youth outside of colleges longed for intelligent questions, honest reflection, and inspiration moving forward." College professors, high school and middle school teachers, early education specialists, and guidance counselors wanted ideas on how to hold purposeful dialogues around this issue. #FergusonSyllabus has now become a virtual movement used to frame how struggle has shaped American history, infused works of art and literature, and given voice to those most hurt by the failures of leadership, capitalism, and democracy.

== Applications ==
=== Freedom Ferguson Library ===
Freedom Ferguson Library is a campaign asking people who benefited from learning from the Ferguson syllabus to consider donating an item to an under-resourced school, prison literacy program, or community center. Chatelain has asked that people write (or make a nameplate) with a message including the words, Ferguson Freedom Library. The expression Freedom Library comes from the Freedom Summer Project of 1964, when civil rights activists created Freedom Schools to educate children and adults.

=== Ferguson Theater Syllabus ===
Inspired by the #FergusonSyllabus, actors and playwrights crowdsourced a list from the Ferguson Moment Facebook group, asking specifically for plays that provide opportunities for conversation around this particular historical moment: the shooting of Michael Brown and the response to that shooting by citizens, law enforcement and the justice system, in Ferguson and in other places like it around the nation.

== See also ==
- Charleston Syllabus
- Hashtag activism
- Hands up, don't shoot
- Black Lives Matter
- Killing of Trayvon Martin
- List of killings by law enforcement officers in the United States, August 2014
- "Trayvon Martin could have been me 35 years ago", statement by President Barack Obama
