= Lorraine A. Williams =

American educator

- Born: August 6, 1923; Washington, D.C.
- Died: May 21, 1996 (aged 72); Washington, D.C.
- Education: Howard University, American University
- Occupations: educator, administrator
- Spouse: Charles E. Williams

Lorraine Anderson Williams (1923-1996) worked at Howard University from 1957 through 1983. She was the first African-American woman to serve as vice president for Academic Affairs.

== Biography ==
Williams was born on August 6, 1923, in Washington, D.C. She attended Dunbar High School, then Howard University where she received her Master of Arts degree in 1945. She went on to attend American University where she received her PhD in 1955.

Williams began her teaching career in 1957 as member of Howard University's Social Sciences faculty. She served as Chairman of the Department of Social Sciences from 1962 through 1969. In 1970 Williams was elected Chairman of the Department of History at Howard.

Williams multi-year chairmanship of the Department of History occurred during the years of student activism at Howard. The history students desired a more Afrocentric approach to world history, while the faculty wanted to keep adequate focus on the importance of the cultures of outside of Africa and America. Williams worked to cultivate the good will of both the faculty and the students, recognizing the importance of each faction's opinions and contributions. Concurrently, Williams was chairman of the department when Howard was in receipt of a 1.75 million dollar grant from the Ford Foundation to be used to improve the Political Science and the History departments. Williams successfully brought about an expansion of faculty, raised salaries, and consolidated the History Department into the 3rd floor of Frederick Douglass Memorial Hall.

She also instituted the annual Rayford W. Logan lecture. The 1970 speaker was John Hope Franklin. Speakers over the next years were John W. Blassingame, Benjamin Arthur Quarles, and C. Vann Woodward.

In 1974 Williams was elected the Vice President for Academic Affairs for Howard. She was the first African-American woman to became vice president for Academic Affairs. She served until 1983. Also in 1974 Williams became the editor of the Journal of Negro History, the first woman to hold that position.

William was a member of the Sigma Gamma Rho, earning the Blanche Edwards Award. She was also a member of the Association for the Study of African American Life and History, as well as the American Association of University Women (AAUW), and the Council of Administrative Women in Education.

Williams died on May 21, 1996, in Washington, D.C.

== Legacy ==
The Association of Black Women Historians established the Lorraine A. Williams Leadership Award to honor distinctive Black woman in education or related areas.
