= Darlene Clark Hine Award =

American history award

The Darlene Clark Hine Award is awarded annually by the Organization of American Historians for best book in African American women's and gender history. Darlene Clark Hine is an expert of African-American history and was President of the OAH in 2001–2002.

The following table lists past recipients.

Year	Winner	Affiliation	Title
2010	Margaret Washington	Cornell University	Sojourner Truth's America
2011	Bettye Collier-Thomas	Temple University	Jesus, Jobs, and Justice: African American Women and Religion
2012	Serena Mayeri	University of Pennsylvania Law School	Reasoning from Race: Feminism, Law, and the Civil Rights Revolution
2013	Sydney Nathans	Duke University	To Free a Family; The Journey of Mary Walker
2014	Estelle B. Freedman	Stanford University	Redefining Rape: Sexual Violence in the Era of Suffrage and Segregation
2015	Karsonya Wise Whitehead	Loyola University Maryland	Notes from a Colored Girl: The Civil War Pocket Diaries of Emilie Frances Davis
2016	Talitha L. LeFlouria	University of Virginia	Chained in Silence: Black Women and Convict Labor in the New South
2017	LaShawn D. Harris	Michigan State University	Sex Workers, Psychics, and Numbers Runners: Black Women in New York City's Underground Economy
2018	Deirdre Cooper Owens	Queens College, CUNY	Medical Bondage: Race, Gender, and the Origins of American Gynecology
2019	Keisha N. Blain	University of Pittsburgh	Set the World on Fire: Black Nationalist Women and the Global Struggle for Freedom
2020	Shennette Garrett-Scott	University of Mississippi	Banking on Freedom: Black Women in U.S. Finance Before the New Deal
2021	Thavolia Glymph	Duke University	The Women’s Fight: The Civil War’s Battles for Home, Freedom, and Nation
2022	Tiya Miles	Harvard University	All That She Carried: The Journey of Ashley's Sack, a Black Family Keepsake
2023	Tomiko Brown-Nagin	Harvard University	Civil Rights Queen: Constance Baker Motley and the Struggle for Equality
2024	Barbara D. Savage	University of Pennsylvania	Merze Tate: The Global Odyssey of a Black Woman Scholar
2025	Kellie Carter Jackson	Wellesley College	We Refuse: A Forceful History of Black Resistance
2026	Ashley D. Farmer	University of Texas at Austin	Queen Mother: Black Nationalism, Reparations, and the Untold Story of Audley Moore
