= Marjorie Priceman =

American writer and illustrator

Marjorie A. Priceman (born 1958) is an American writer or illustrator of more than 30 children's picture books including two Caldecott Honor Books (runners-up for the Caldecott Medal). Her first picture book, Friend or Frog, was published in 1989, soon after her graduation from the Rhode Island School of Design. Priceman's books are known for their bright watercolors, free-flowing lines and whimsical spirit. Her illustrations to When Zaydeh Danced on Eldridge Street (1997) by Elsa Okon Rael have been described as "religiously authentic and playful at the same time."

One of her most popular books is Zin! Zin! Zin! A Violin, by Lloyd Moss and illustrated by Marjorie Priceman. She lives in Lewisburg, Pennsylvania.

== Bibliography ==
=== As Author and Illustrator ===
- Friend or Frog (1989)
- How to Make an Apple Pie and See the World (1994)
- Emeline at the circus (1999)
- It's Me, Marva! (2001)
- Froggie Went A-Courting: An Old Tale with a New Twist (2000)
- Little Red Riding Hood: A Classic Collectible Pop-Up (2001)
- Princess Picky (2002)
- Hot Air: The (Mostly) True Story of the First Hot-Air Balloon Ride (2005)
- How to Make a Cherry Pie and See the U.S.A. (2008)

=== As Illustrator ===
- Rachel Fister's Blister (1990) Author: Amy MacDonald
- For Laughing Out Loud: Poems to Tickle Your Funnybone (1991) Author: Jack Prelutsky
- A. Nonny Mouse Writes Again! (1993) Author: Harry Mazer
- The Tiny, Tiny Boy and the Big (1993) Author: Nancy Van Laan
- Zin! Zin! Zin! A Violin (1995) Author: Lloyd Moss
- Cousin Ruth's Tooth (1996) Author: Amy MacDonald
- What Zeesie Saw on Delancey Street (1996) Author: Elsa Rael
- One of Each (1997) Author: Mary Ann Hoberman
- When Zaydeh Danced on Eldridge Street (1997) Author: Elsa Rael
- This is the Day! (1998) Author: Phillis Gershator
- My Nine Lives by Clio (1998) Author: Ruth Prawer Jhabvala
- Dancin' in the Kitchen (1998) Author: Frank P. Christian and Wendy Gelsanliter
- Serefina Under the Circumstances (1999) Author: Phyllis Grissim-Theroux
- The Brand New Kid (2000) Author: Katie Couric
- Things That Sometimes Happen: Very Short Stories for Little Listeners (2002) Author: Avi
- The Blue Ribbon Day (2004) Author: Katie Couric
- The Bake Shop Ghost (2005) Author: Jacqueline Ogburn
- Paris in the Spring with Picasso (2010) Author: Joan Yolleck
- Cold Snap (2012) Author: Eileen Spinelli
- Jazz Age Josephine (2012) Author: Jonah Winter
- The Ride: The Legend of Betsy Dowdy (2012) Author: Kitty Griffin
- Julie Andrews' Treasury for All Seasons: Poems and Songs to Celebrate the Year (2012) Author: Julie Andrews and Emma Walton Hamilton
- Who Says Women Can't Be Doctors? The Story of Elizabeth Blackwell (2013) Author: Tanya Lee Stone
- Miracle on 133rd Street (2015) Author: Sonia Manzano
- The Music of Life: Bartolomeo Cristofori & the Invention of the Piano (2017) Author: Elizabeth Rusch
- Who Says Women Can’t Be Computer Programmers?: The Story of Ada Lovelace (2018) Author: Tanya Lee Stone
- Follow the Recipe: Poems About Imagination, Celebration, and Cake (2020) Author: Marilyn Singer
- A Snowy Hanukkah for Luz (2026) Author: Ruth Behar
