= De Vargas =

De Vargas is a surname of Spanish origin. Notable people with the surname include:

- Andrés de Vargas (1613–1647), Spanish painter
- Diego de Vargas (1643–1704), Spanish colonial governor
- Francisco de Vargas (born 1970), Paraguayan lawyer and politician
- Francisco de Vargas y Mejía (1500–1566), Spanish diplomat and writer
- Gutierre de Vargas Carvajal (1506–1559), Spanish Roman Catholic bishop
- José de Vargas Ponce (1760–1821), Spanish erudite, poet and writer
- Luis de Vargas (1502–1568), Spanish Renaissance painter
- Urbán de Vargas (1606–1656), Spanish Baroque composer
- Valentin de Vargas (1935–2013), American actor
