= Juliet E. K. Walker =

American academic, writer (born 1940)

- Born: 1940 (age 85–86); United States
- Education: Roosevelt University (B.A.); University of Chicago (M.A., Ph.D.)
- Alma mater: University of Chicago
- Occupations: Historian, writer, educator
- Employer: University of Texas at Austin
- Known for: African-American business history
- Notable work: Free Frank (1983); The History of Black Business in America (1998); Encyclopedia of African American Business History (1999)
- Title: Professor emerita
- Relatives: Free Frank McWorter (great-great grandfather)

Juliet E. K. Walker (born 1940) is an American historian, writer, and educator. She is a foremost scholar on African-American entrepreneurship, her books on Free Frank McWorter and the history of African-American business having won various awards. Walker is a professor emerita at the University of Texas at Austin.

Walker has a B.A. degree from Roosevelt University in Chicago; followed by a M.A. degree at the University of Chicago. She received a Ph.D. in 1976 in American history from the University of Chicago, where John Hope Franklin was one of her professors. Her postdoctoral studies were at the Radcliffe Bunting Institute's Berkshire Fellowship, and the W. E. B. Du Bois Institute at Harvard University.

Walker has written about New Philadelphia, Pennsylvania. Free Frank McWorter is her great-great grandfather.

== Writings ==
- Free Frank: A Black Pioneer on the Antebellum Frontier, The University Press of Kentucky (1983) ISBN 0-8131-0840-3
- War, Peace, and Structural Violence: Peace Activism and the African- American Experience, Indiana University, Center on Global Change and World Peace (1992), a monograph
- The History of Black Business in America: Capitalism, Race, Entrepreneurship (1st ed.). New York City, NY: Macmillan Press. 1998.
- Walker, Juliet E. K., ed. (1999). Encyclopedia of African American Business History. Westport, CT: Greenwood Publishing Group. ISBN 0-313-29549-2.
