= Tanya Lee Stone =

American author (born 1965)

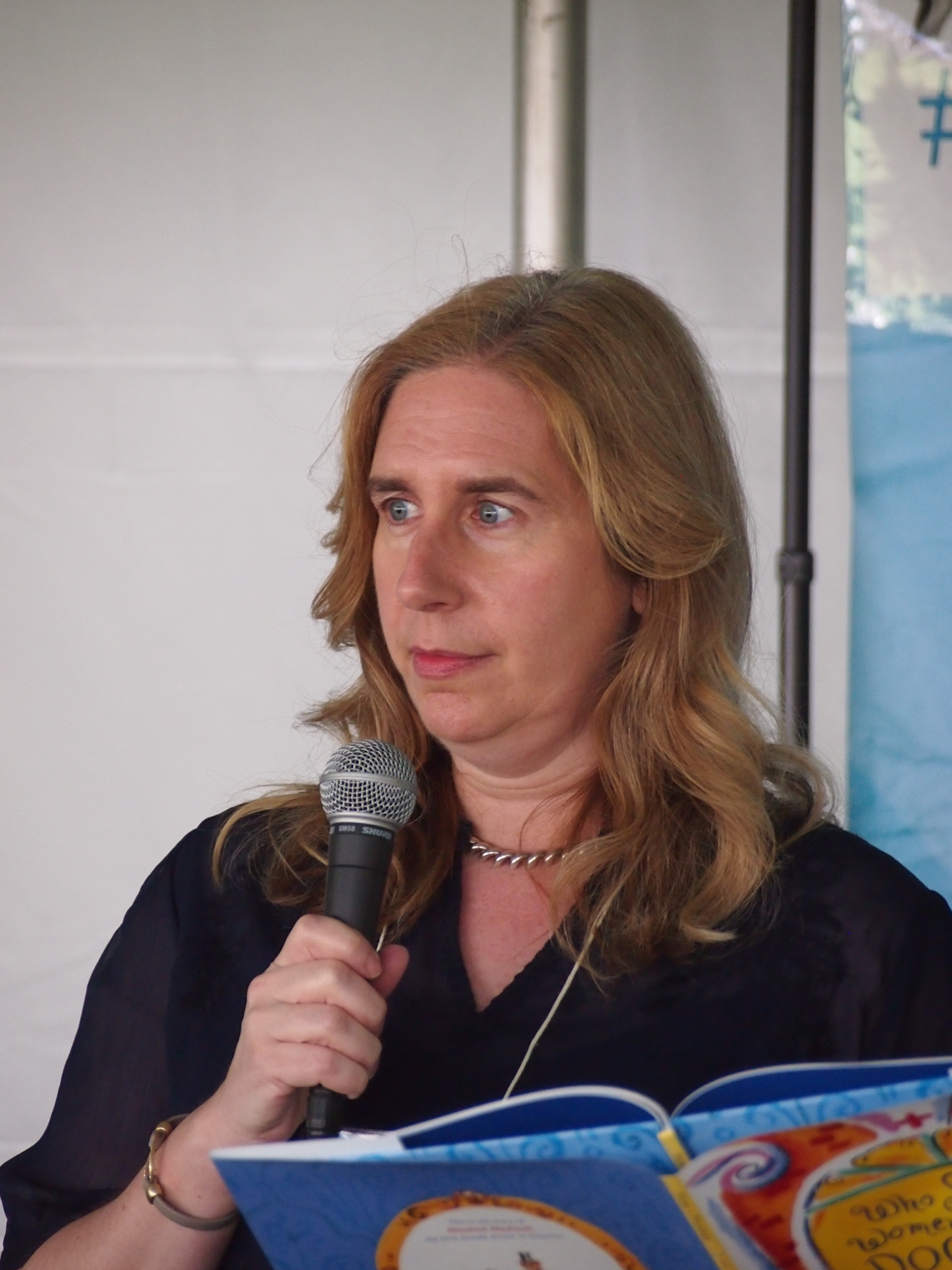
- Born: 1965 (age 60–61)
- Occupation: Novelist; poet
- Education: Oberlin College (BA); Southern Connecticut State University (MS)
- Genre: Children's nonfiction, young adult nonfiction

Tanya Lee Stone (born 1965) is an American author of children's and young adult books. She writes narrative nonfiction for middle-grade students and young adults, as well as nonfiction picture books. Her stories often center women and people of color.

Her work has received an NAACP Image Award, Robert F. Sibert Medal, and Golden Kite Award, among others. She is also the author of the young adult verse novel, A Bad Boy Can Be Good for a Girl, which was the 44th-most banned and challenged book in the United States between 2010 and 2019, as well as the sixth most banned and challenged book in 2013.

== Education ==
Stone received her Bachelor of Arts in English from Oberlin College in 1987, then a Master of Science from Southern Connecticut State University.

== Career ==
After graduating from Oberlin College in 1987, Stone became a children's book editor in New York City.

After moving to Vermont, she wrote her first book. Since then, she has written more than 100 books for children and young adults. Her articles, essays, and reviews have appeared in The New York Times, The Horn Book, Publishers Weekly, and School Library Journal.

Beyond writing, Stone is an assistant director and program director of the Professional Writing program at Champlain College in Burlington, Vermont. She also serves on several literature-related committees and is the co-founder of Kindling Words.

== Selected Texts ==
=== A Bad Boy Can Be Good for a Girl (2006) ===
A Bad Boy Can Be Good for a Girl was published January 10, 2006 by Wendy Lamb Books. The book landed on the American Library Association's Top 10 Banned Books List in 2013 because of its inclusion of drugs, alcohol, and smoking; nudity, offensive language, as well as its sexually explicit content. Between 2010 and 2019, it was the 44th most banned and challenged book in the United States.

=== Almost Astronauts (2009) ===
Almost Astronauts: 13 Women Who Dared to Dream was originally published February 24, 2009 by Candlewick Press, then republished September 27, 2011. The book has received the following accolades, among others:

- Boston Globe-Horn Book Award for Nonfiction honor book (2009)
- Bank Street College Flora Stieglitz Straus Award winner (2010)
- Jane Addams Children's Book Award for Older Children honor book (2010)
- NCTE Orbis Pictus Award honor book (2010)
- Robert F. Sibert Informational Book Medal winner (2010)

=== Courage Has No Color (2013) ===
Courage Has No Color: The True Story of the Triple Nickles, America's First Black Paratroopers was published January 22, 2013 by Candlewick Press. The book has received the following accolades, among others:

- American Library Association's (ALA) Popular Paperbacks for Young Adults Top Ten (2014)
- NAACP Image Award for Outstanding Literary Work – Youth/Teens (2014)
- YALSA Award for Excellence in Nonfiction finalist (2014)
- NCTE Orbis Pictus Award Honor Book (2014)

=== Who Says Women Can't Be Doctors? (2013) ===
Who Says Women Can't Be Doctors?: The Story of Elizabeth Blackwell was published February 19, 2013 by Henry Holt & Company. The book has received the following accolades:

- The Amelia Bloomer Book List (2014)
- NCTE Orbis Pictus Award nominee (2014)
- PEN/Steven Kroll Award Longlist (2014)

=== The House That Jane Built (2015) ===
The House That Jane Built: A Story about Jane Addams, illustrated by Kathryn Brown, was published June 23, 2015 by Henry Holt & Company. The book was an NCTE Orbis Pictus Awardnominee (2016).

=== Pass Go and Collect $200 (2018) ===
Pass Go and Collect $200: The Real Story of How Monopoly Was Invented, illustrated by Steve Salerno, was published July 17, 2018 by Henry Holt and Co. The book was an NCTE Orbis Pictus Award Honor Book (2019).

== Publications ==
=== Fiction ===
- A Bad Boy Can Be Good for a Girl (2006)

=== Nonfiction ===
==== Alphabet series ====
- D Is for Dreidel, illustrated by Dawn Apperley (2002)
- M Is for Mistletoe, illustrated by Claudine Gévry (2003
- P is for Passover, illustrated by Margeaux Lucas (2003)
- B Is for Bunny, illustrated by Sue Rama (2006)
- T Is for Turkey, illustrated by Gerald Kelley (2009)
- H Is for Haunted House (2010)
- A Is for America, illustrated by Gerald Kelley (2011)

==== Anthology contributions ====
- The Great War: An Anthology Inspired by Objects from the First World War (2014)
- 1789: Twelve Authors Explore a Year of Rebellion, Revolution, and Change, edited by Marc Aronson and Susan Campbell Bartoletti (2020)

==== Biographies ====
- Doctors in Action: Orthopedist (1998)
- Diana: Princess of the People (1999)
- Rosie O'Donnell: America's Favorite Grown Up Kid (2000)
- Laura Welch Bush: First Lady (2001)
- Oprah Winfrey: Success With an Open Heart (2001)
- Ilan Ramon: Israel's First Astronaut (2003)
- DK Biography: Abraham Lincoln (2005)
- DK Biography: Amelia Earhart (2007)
- Elizabeth Leads the Way: Elizabeth Cady Stanton and the Right to Vote, illustrated by Rebecca Gibbon (2008)
- Sandy's Circus: A Story About Alexander Calder, illustrated by Boris Kulikov (2008)
- Up Close: Ella Fitzgerald (2008)
- Almost Astronauts: 13 Women Who Dared to Dream (2009)
- DK Biography: Laura Ingalls Wilder (2009)
- Courage Has No Color: The True Story of the Triple Nickles, America's First Black Paratroopers (2013)
- Who Says Women Can't Be Doctors?: The Story of Elizabeth Blackwell, illustrated by Marjorie Priceman (2013)
- The House That Jane Built: A Story about Jane Addams, illustrated by Kathryn Brown (2015)
- Who Says Women Can't Be Computer Programmers?: The Story of Ada Lovelace, illustrated by Marjorie Priceman (2018)

==== History books ====
- Americas Top 10: Construction Wonders (1998)
- The Great Depression and World War II (Making of America) (1998)
- The Progressive Era and World War I (Making of America) (1998)
- Teddy Bears (Made in the USA) (2000)
- Recycled Paper (Made in the USA) (2000)
- Snowboards (Made in the USA) (2000)
- Toothpaste (Made in the USA), illustrated by Jill C. Brady (2001)
- Americas Top 10: National Monuments (2008)
- The Good, the Bad, and the Barbie: A Doll's History and Her Impact on Us (2010)
- Girl Rising: Changing the World One Girl at a Time (2017)
- Pass Go and Collect $200: The Real Story of How Monopoly Was Invented, illustrated by Steve Salerno (2018)

==== Space books ====
- Saturn (2001)
- Mars (2002)
- Mercury (2002)
- Venus (2002)

==== Wilderness books ====
- Wild America: Deer (2002)
- Kangaroos (2003)
- Tigers (2003)
- Turtles (2003)
- Wild America: Mouse (2003)
- Wild America: Opossum (2003)
- Wild Wild World: Mantises (2003)
- Wild Wild World: Mosquitoes (2003)
- Wild Wild World: Sea Lions (2003)
- Wild Wild World: Snails (2003)
- Regional Wild America: Unique Animals of Alaska (2004)
- Regional Wild America: Unique Animals of Hawaii (2004)
- Regional Wild America: Unique Animals of the Midwest (2004)
- Regional Wild America Unique Animals Of the Pacific Coast (2004)
- Regional Wild America: Unique Animals of the Southeast (2004)
- Living in a World of Blue: Where Survival Means Blending in (2005)
- Living in a World of Brown: Where Survival Means Blending in (2005)
- Living in a World of Green: Where Survival Means Blending in (2005)
- Living in a World of White: Where Survival Means Blending in (2005)
- Regional Wild America: Unique Animals of the Islands (2005)
- Regional Wild America: Unique Animals of the Mountains and Prairies (2005)
- Regional Wild America: Unique Animals of the Northeast (2005)
- Wild Wild World: Butterflies (2005)
- Wild Wild World: Gorillas (2005)
- Wild Wild World: Koalas (2005)
- Wild Wild World: Lions (2005)
- Crocodilians (2006)
- Wild Wild World: Chimpanzees (2006)
- Chickens
- Elephants
- Frogs
- Hippos
- Lobsters
- Octopuses
- Peacocks
- Pigs
- Polar Bears
- Regional Wild America: Unique Animals of the South
- Rhinos
- Sharks
- Snakes

==== Nonfiction - Other ====
- Medical Causes (1997)
