= Darlene Clark Hine =

American author and professor (born 1947)

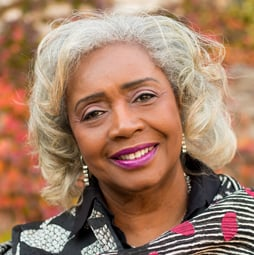
- Born: Darlene Clark; February 7, 1947 (age 79); Morley, Missouri, U.S.
- Education: Roosevelt University; Kent State University
- Occupations: Author and professor
- Notable work: Black Women in Whites (1989); Black Women in America (1993)
- Awards: National Humanities Medal

Darlene Clark Hine (born February 7, 1947) is an American author and professor in the field of African-American history. She is a recipient of the 2014 National Humanities Medal.

== Early life and education ==
Darlene Clark was born in Morley, Missouri, the oldest of four children of Levester Clark, a truck driver, and Lottie Mae Clark. She married William C. Hine in 1970 and divorced in 1974. She married Johnny E. Brown in 1981 and divorced in 1986 and has one daughter, Robbie Davine.

Hine received her BA degree in 1968 from Roosevelt University, her MA from Kent State University in 1970 and her PhD in 1975 from the same institution.

== Career ==
From 1972 to 1974, Hine worked as an assistant professor of history and black studies at South Carolina State College, from 1974 to 1979 she was an assistant professor at Purdue University in West Lafayette, Indiana, and from 1979 to 1985 an associate professor at Purdue.

From 1985 to 2004, Hine served as the John A. Hannah Professor of History at Michigan State University in East Lansing. She helped to establish one of the first doctoral programs in comparative black history. She also helped edit a series on African-American history in the United Statesman Milestones in African American History.

In 2004, Hine joined Northwestern University as the Board of Trustees Professor of African-American Studies and Professor of History. She retired from the university in 2017.

== Culture of dissemblance ==
In 1989, in an article titled "Rape and the Inner Lives of Black Women in the Middle West: Preliminary Thoughts on the Culture of Dissemblance", Hine introduced the concept of a "culture of dissemblance". She defined dissemblance as "the behavior and attitudes of Black women that created the appearance of openness and disclosure but actually shielded the truth of their inner lives and selves from their oppressors." The concept helped Hine identify why "African-American women developed a code of silence around intimate matters as a response to discursive and literal attacks on black sexuality." It also diversified the list of reasons Black women might have migrated North, citing "sexual violence and abuse as [catalysts] for migration".

Evelyn Brooks Higginbotham has written that the culture of dissemblance was especially relevant to Black women "of the middle class". In the original article, Hine states that the most "institutionalized forms" of the culture of dissemblance exist in the creation of the National Association of Colored Women's Clubs in 1896.

== Publications ==
Hine wrote three books about African-American women's history. Her 1989 book Black Women in Whites: Racial Conflict and Cooperation in the Nursing Profession, 1890–1950 was named Outstanding Book by the Gustavus Myers Center for the Study of Human Rights. She edited a two-volume encyclopedia, Black Women in America, first published in 1993. Her book A Shining Thread of Hope was favorably reviewed in The New York Times. She co-edited with John McCluskey Jr The Black Chicago Renaissance (2012).

Hines' papers are preserved in the David M. Rubenstein Rare Book & Manuscript Library at Duke University.

== Awards and accolades ==
Because of her expertise on the subject of race, class, and gender in American society, Hine received the Otto Wirth Alumni Award for outstanding scholarship from Roosevelt University in 1988 and the Special achievement award from Kent State University Alumni Association in 1991.

Hine has been awarded honorary doctorates from the University of Massachusetts, Amherst, in 1998, from Purdue University (2002), Buffalo State College (2002), Lake Forest College (2010), Roosevelt University (2014), Michigan State University (2015), and from Carnegie Mellon University (2019).

She served as president of the Organization of American Historians from 2001 to 2002.

In October 2006, she was inducted into the American Academy of Arts and Sciences.

In 2010, the Organization of American Historians presented the inaugural Darlene Clark Hine Award for best book in African American Women and Gender History.

Hine was presented in 2013 with a National Humanities Medal by President Barack Obama, for her work on understanding the African-American experience.
