= Marcia Chatelain =

American historian

- Chatelain in 2026
- Born: 1979 (age 46–47); Chicago, Illinois
- Awards: Pulitzer Prize for History (2021)

Academic background
- Education: University of Missouri; Brown University
- Doctoral advisor: Mari Jo Buhle

Academic work
- Discipline: History, African American Studies
- Institutions: University of Pennsylvania Georgetown University

Marcia Chatelain (born 1979) is an American academic who serves as the Penn Presidential Compact Professor of Africana Studies at the University of Pennsylvania. In 2021, she was awarded the Pulitzer Prize for History for her book Franchise: The Golden Arches in Black America (2020), for which she also won the James Beard Award for Writing in 2022. Chatelain was the first black woman to win the latter award.

She is also the creator of the Ferguson Syllabus social media campaign and the author of South Side Girls: Growing Up in the Great Migration (2015).

== Biography ==
=== Education and career ===
Chatelain was born in 1979 in Chicago, Illinois. Raised in Chicago, she attended St. Ignatius College Prep.

She graduated from the University of Missouri in 2001, with degrees in journalism and religious studies. She then worked as a Resident Scholar at the Harry S. Truman Scholarship Foundation. Chatelain received her A.M. and Ph.D. in American Civilization from Brown University, graduating in 2008, and was awarded the University of California, Santa Barbara's Black Studies Dissertation Fellowship. Chatelain worked as the Reach for Excellence Assistant Professor of Honors and African American Studies at the University of Oklahoma's Honors College, before becoming a Provost's Distinguished Associate Professor of History and African American Studies at Georgetown University.

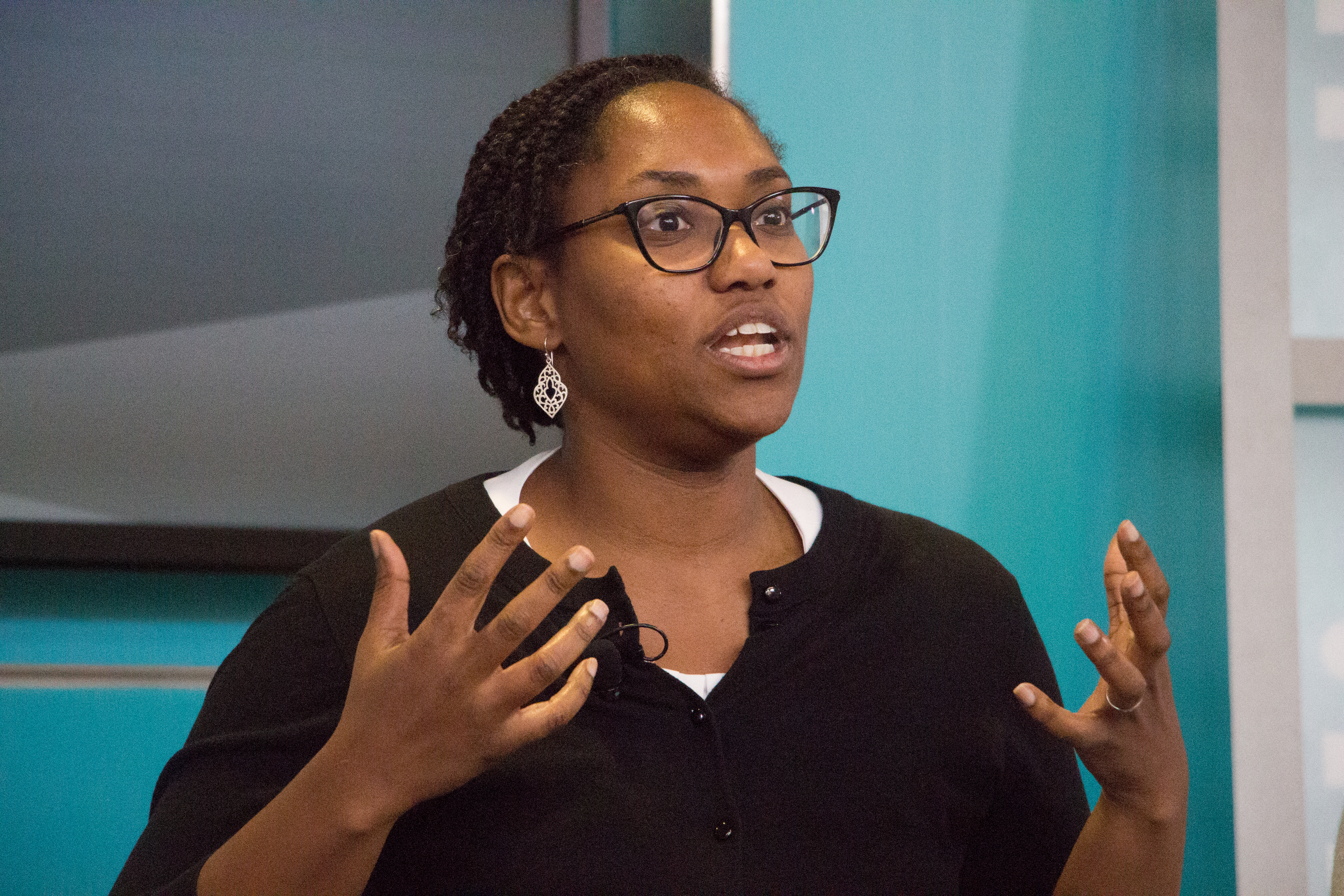
Chatelain in 2018

=== #FergusonSyllabus ===
In 2014, following the killing of Michael Brown in Ferguson, Missouri, Chatelain mobilized other scholars on Twitter to talk about what was happening in Ferguson with their students and contribute to a crowdsourced reading list. The result became known as the #FergusonSyllabus. Its success has led to other crowdsourced syllabi to respond to national tragedies. In 2016, The Chronicle of Higher Education named Chatelain a Top Influencer in academics, in recognition of the success of #FergusonSyllabus.

=== Podcasting ===
In 2017, Chatelain contributed to the Undisclosed podcast as a resident historian. As of August 2020, she hosted the Slate podcast The Waves on feminism, gender, and popular culture.

=== Works ===
Chatelain has published three books: South Side Girls: Growing Up in the Great Migration (Duke University Press, 2015), about the history of Chicago's Great Migration through the lens of black girls, Franchise: The Golden Arches in Black America (Liveright/W. W. Norton, 2020) about the history of the relationship between civil rights and the fast food industry, and How Bright the Path Grows: The Untold Story of the Women Who Made the March on Washington (Penguin Random House, 2026), about the role black women had in the March on Washington.

=== Awards, honors, and service ===
Chatelain has received awards from the Ford Foundation, the American Association of University Women, and the German Marshall Fund of the United States. She has won teaching awards at Georgetown University, where she serves on the Working Group on Slavery, Memory, and Reconciliation. In 2019, Chatelain was named an Andrew Carnegie Fellow. She also served as an Eric and Wendy Schmidt Fellow at the New America Foundation.

In 2023, Chatelain was nominated to the American Academy of Arts and Sciences.

Chatelain is a 2025 Guggenheim Fellow.

== Personal life ==
Chatelain is Catholic.

== Literary prizes ==
In 2021, Chatelain was awarded the Pulitzer Prize for History for her book Franchise: The Golden Arches in Black America. For her work on Franchise, Chatelain also received the 2022 James Beard Foundation Award, the 2021 Hagley Prize in Business History, the 2021 Organization of American Historians' Lawrence W. Levine Award, the 2021 Hurston/Wright Legacy Award for Nonfiction, the 2019–2021 Business History Review's Alfred and Fay Chandler Book Award, and the 2020 Hooks National Book Award.

== Bibliography ==
- —— (2015). South Side Girls: Growing Up in the Great Migration. Duke University Press. ISBN 9780822358541.
- —— (2020). Franchise: The Golden Arches in Black America. Liveright/W. W. Norton. ISBN 9781631498701.
- —— (2026). How Bright the Path Grows: The Untold Story of the Women Who Made the March on Washington. Pantheon Books. ISBN 9780553387254.
