= Keisha N. Blain =

American historian (born 1985)

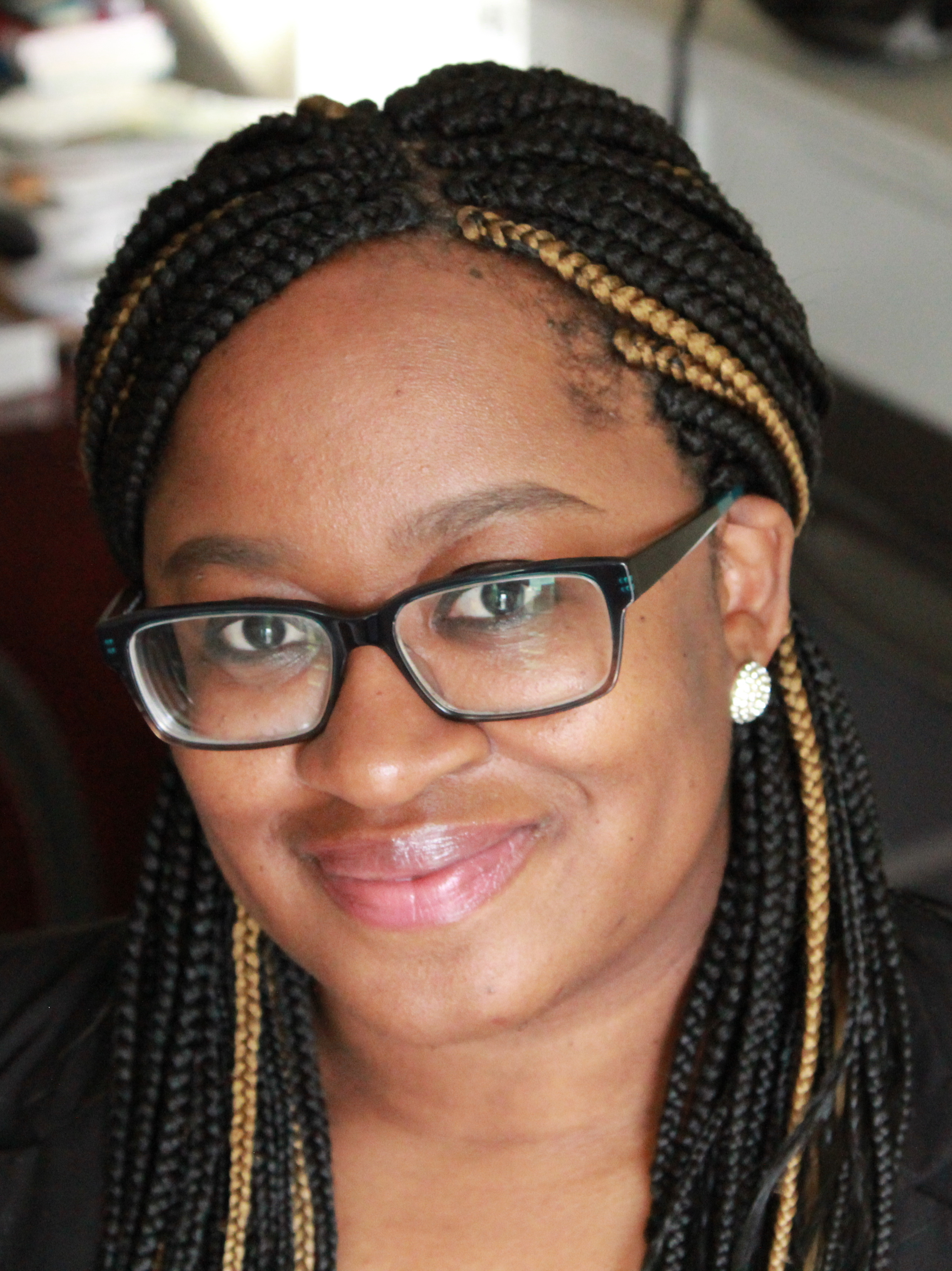
- Born: 1985 (age 40–41)
- Occupations: Writer and historian
- Known for: Charleston Syllabus
- Awards: Berkshire Conference of Women Historians award Guggenheim Fellowship; Dan David Prize

Academic background
- Education: Binghamton University; Princeton University
- Thesis: "For the freedom of the race": Black women and the practices of nationalism, 1929-1945. (2014)

Academic work
- Institutions: Brown University; University of Pittsburgh; University of Iowa; Pennsylvania State University
- Notable works: Four Hundred Souls
- Website: keishablain.com

Keisha N. Blain (born 1985) is an American writer and scholar of American and African-American history. She is Professor of Africana Studies and History at Brown University. Blain served as president of the African American Intellectual History Society from 2017 to 2021. Blain is associated with the Charleston Syllabus social media movement.

== Early life and education ==
Blain was born in 1985. She earned her Bachelor of Arts degree in history and Africana studies from Binghamton University before attending Princeton University for her master's degree and doctorate in history. Upon earning her Ph.D., Blain completed her postdoctoral research at Pennsylvania State University's Africana Research Center.

== Career ==
Blain is a scholar of African-American history, African Diaspora Studies, and Women's and Gender History. After completing her postdoctoral research in 2015, Blain taught at the University of Iowa for two years. While there, she received an American Postdoctoral Research Leave Fellowship from the American Association of University Women (AAUW). She also received a two-year Summer Institute on Tenure and Professional Advancement Fellowship at Duke University during the summer. In 2017, she began teaching at the University of Pittsburgh's Department of History.

She co-edited Charleston Syllabus: Readings on Race, Racism, and Racial Violence with Chad Williams and Kidada Williams in 2016. She became senior editor of Black Perspectives, the blog of the African American Intellectual History Society in 2016. In 2017, Blain was awarded the Roy Rosenzweig Prize for Innovation in Digital History from the American Historical Association.

In 2018, Blain published Set the World on Fire: Black Nationalist Women and the Global Struggle for Freedom, which received the Darlene Clark Hine Award for the best book in African American women's and gender history from the Organization of American Historians (OAH). It also won the Berkshire Conference of Women Historians award for a first book that deals substantially with the history of women, gender, and/or sexuality. The book was also selected as one of the best history books of 2018 by Smithsonian Magazine. That year, she also co-edited New Perspectives on the Black Intellectual Tradition. She was later appointed to the OAH's Distinguished Lectureship Program and received a 2018–19 Ford Foundation Post-doctoral Fellowship. In 2019, she co-edited a third collection entitled To Turn the Whole World Over: Black Women and Internationalism. The book was featured in Ms. Magazine.

In spring 2020, Blain received a Hutchins Fellowship from Harvard University to work on her new book East Unites with West: Black Women, Japan, and Visions of Afro-Asian Solidarity. She also serves on various editorial boards, including The Journal of African American History, The Journal of Women's History, and Modern Intellectual History. In 2021, Blain co-edited Four Hundred Souls with Ibram X. Kendi. The book concerned African-American history and collected works written by ninety Black writers. Following its publication, the book was shortlisted for the 2022 Andrew Carnegie Medals for Excellence in Fiction and Nonfiction.

In April 2022, Blain was awarded fellowships from the Guggenheim Foundation and the Andrew Carnegie Corporation. She joined the faculty at Brown University in summer 2022. She also served as a consultant to the Crash Course Black American History YouTube series, hosted by Clint Smith. She is on the editorial board of the Journal of the History of Ideas.

Blain is the winner of the 2024 Dan David Prize.

In 2025, Blain was elected to the Society of American Historians and named editor-in-chief of Global Black Thought, an academic journal published by the University of Pennsylvania Press dedicated to the study of Black intellectual tradition. Without Fear: Black Women and the Making of Human Rights by Blain was published in 2025.
