= Elizabeth Todd-Breland =

American historian and author

- Citizenship: United States
- Education: University of Chicago
- Occupations: Historian & Author
- Employer: University of Illinois Chicago
- Known for: Research & Writing
- Notable work: A Political Education: Black Politics and Education Reform in Chicago and I Didn't Come Here to Lie: My Life and Education
- Awards: Outstanding Book Award from the American Educational Research Association, Pauli Murray Book Prize from the African American Intellectual History Society, and Organization of American Historians Distinguished Lecturer.
- Website: Elizabeth Todd Breland

Elizabeth Todd-Breland is an American historian specializing in the history of education, African-American history and Chicago history, public policy. She is associate professor of history at the University of Illinois Chicago and the author of two books. She was from 2019 to 2024 a member of the Chicago Board of Education and served as vice president of the board.

== Career ==
Todd-Breland holds a Ph.D. in history from the University of Chicago. She currently serves as an associate professor of history and is an affiliated faculty in Black Studies at the University of Illinois Chicago and develops curriculums on African American history, racial justice, and urban justice. Previously, Todd-Breland was an assistant professor at Governors State University and was an American Council of Learned Societies Postdoctoral Fellow at Northwestern University. Todd-Breland has worked with Chicago area high school students as a college counselor and social studies.

In 2019, Todd-Breland was appointed to the Chicago Board of Education by Mayor Lori Lightfoot, and served a full term. In 2023, she was re-appointed to the board to serve as Vice President. In 2025, along with six other members, Todd-Breland resigned in protest from the Board of Education over Mayor Johnson's plan to use a loan for expenses in the school district.

== Publications and awards ==
In 2018, Todd-Breland published A Political Education: Black Politics and Education Reform in Chicago since the 1960s with University of North Carolina Press. The book received the Pauli Murray Book Prize from the African American Intellectual History Society (AAIHS) in 2019. As well as the 2019 Outstanding Book Award from the American Educational Research Association, the 2018 Kenneth Jackson Award for Best Book in North American Urban History from the Urban History Association. The book was short listed for the 2019 Stone Book Award from the Museum of African American History and was an honorable mention for the 2019 Liberty Legacy Foundation Award from the Organization of American Historians, and the New Scholar's Book Award, Division F, from the American Educational Research Association.

Todd-Breland co-authored I Didn't Come Here to Lie: My Life and Education, a memoir of Karen Lewis, a Chicago Teachers Union President, educator, and labor leader. Lewis passed away during the early stages of compiling the book, and Todd-Breland had to write the book from interviews and notes. Ms. Magazine named the book as one of the "Most Anticipated Feminist Books of 2025" and the book was awarded the inaugural Dr. Timuel D. Black, Jr. Award for Civic Engagement from Public Narrative. Todd-Breland's writing has been included in Souls, The Journal of African American History, and other edited scholarly volumes. She has also been featured on C-SPAN, and contributed to NPR, The Washington Post, ESPN, and other local print and online media, radio, and television.

In 2016, she received a National Academy of Education Postdoctoral Fellowship and in 2022, Todd-Breland was nominated as an Organization of American Historians (OAH) Distinguished Lecturer.
