= Deirdre Cooper Owens =

American historian

- Education: Bennett College; Clark Atlanta University; University of California, Los Angeles
- Occupations: Historian and reproductive rights activist
- Employer: University of Connecticut
- Notable work: Medical Bondage: Race, Gender, and the Origins of American Gynecology (2017)

Deirdre Cooper Owens is an American historian and reproductive rights activist known for her 2017 book Medical Bondage: Race, Gender, and the Origins of American Gynecology. She is an associate professor at the University of Connecticut.

== Biography ==
Deirdre Cooper Owens was born to a National Archives and Records Administration employee father and a genealogist mother and raised in Anacostia, a neighborhood in southeastern Washington D.C. Descending from South Carolina Lowcountry Gullahs on both her parents' sides, she learned Gullah-language stories from her grandfather as a young child.

Cooper Owens graduated from Bennett College, Clark Atlanta University, and University of California, Los Angeles, the latter where she obtained her PhD in history. She later joined the faculty of the University of Nebraska–Lincoln, where she was Charles and Linda Wilson Professor in the History of Medicine and directed the Humanities In Medicine program. She also directed the Library Company of Philadelphia's program in African-American history. In 2023, she moved to the University of Connecticut's Department of History and the Africana Studies Institute and became an associate professor there.

As an academic, Cooper Owens specializes in African-American history, particularly history of medicine. In 2017, she published Medical Bondage: Race, Gender, and the Origins of American Gynecology, a book on the exploitation of Black women in 19th-century gynecology; she won the 2018 Darlene Clark Hine Award for said book. This book has also been translated to Korean. In 2024, she was a contributor to the volume Roe v. Wade: Fifty Years After, a volume on the United States abortion-rights movement.

Cooper Owens is an advocate for reproductive justice, having worked with organizations in combating Black maternal mortality in the United States. She also works as a public speaker.

== Bibliography ==
- Medical Bondage: Race, Gender, and the Origins of American Gynecology (2017)
- Roe v. Wade: Fifty Years Later (2024)
