= Courage Has No Color =

2013 nonfiction book by Tanya Lee Stone

Courage Has No Color: The True Story of the Triple Nickles, America's First Black Paratroopers
- Author: Tanya Lee Stone
- Language: English
- Subject: The Triple Nickles
- Genre: Nonfiction
- Publisher: Candlewick Press
- Publication date: 2013
- Publication place: USA
- Media type: Print, Audio
- Pages: 160
- ISBN: 9780763665487

Courage Has No Color: The True Story of the Triple Nickles, America's First Black Paratroopers is a nonfiction book geared toward children, written by Tanya Lee Stone and published January 22, 2013 by Candlewick Press. The book tells the story of the 555th Parachute Infantry Battalion, nicknamed The Triple Nickles, an all-Black airborne unit of the United States Army during World War II.

In 2014, the book won the NAACP Image Award for Outstanding Literary Work – Youth/Teens.

== Reception ==
Courage Has No Color is a Junior Library Guild book. It received starred reviews from Booklist, Publishers Weekly, and Kirkus, as well as positive reviews from The Bulletin of the Center for Children's Books, The Washington Post, and School Library Journal.

Kirkus called the book "[a]n exceptionally well-researched, lovingly crafted and important tribute to unsung American heroes." Publishers Weekly called it "[a] captivating look at a small but significant piece of military and civil rights history."

The New York Public Library, The Bulletin, Publishers Weekly, and Kirkus named Courage Has No Color one of the best nonfiction children's books of 2013. The Center for the Study of Multicultural Children's Literature included it in their list of the best multicultural children's books of the year.

Awards and honors for Courage Has No Color
Year	Award/Honor	Result	Ref.
2014	ALSC Notable Children's Book for Older Readers	Selection	
2014	ALSC Notable Children's Recordings	Selection	
2014	Cooperative Children's Book Center Choices	Selection	
2014	NAACP Image Award for Outstanding Literary Work – Youth/Teens	Winner	
2014	NCTE Orbis Pictus Award	Honor Book	
2014	IRA Notable Books for a Global Society	Selection	
2014	YALSA Excellence in Nonfiction Award	Finalist	
2014	YALSA Amazing Audiobooks for Young Adults	Selection	
2014	YALSA Popular Paperbacks for Young Adults	Top 10	
2015	William Allen White Children's Book Award	Selection	
