= Daina Ramey Berry =

American historian

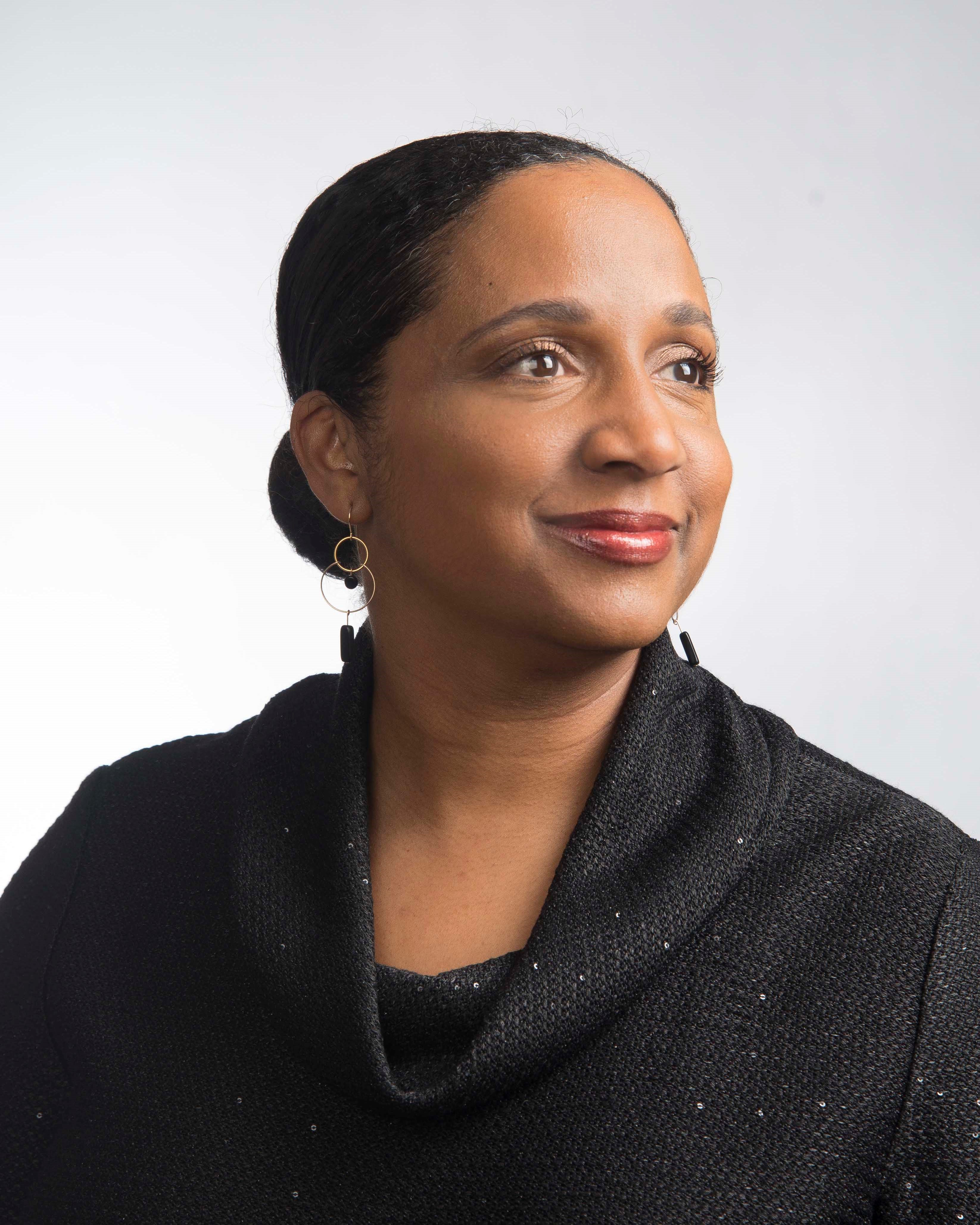
- Education: University of California, Los Angeles (BA, MA, PhD)
- Scientific career
- Fields: History; African American Studies
- Workplaces: Arizona State University; Michigan State University; University of Texas at Austin; University of California at Santa Barbara

Daina Ramey Berry is an American historian and academic who is the Michael Douglas Dean of Humanities and Fine Arts at the University of California at Santa Barbara. She was formerly the associate dean of the graduate school and chair of the history department at the University of Texas at Austin. She studies gender and slavery, as well as black women's history in the United States. She has written books about the connection between the idea of skilled work and the gender of enslaved people in antebellum Georgia, the economic history of slavery in the United States, and the historical contributions of African American women to the politics and governance of the United States and to securing their own rights.

== Education ==
Berry attended the University of California, Los Angeles, where she graduated with a Bachelor of Arts in history in 1992. She continued to study at the University of California, Los Angeles as a graduate student. In 1994, she earned a Master of Arts in African American studies and in 1998, she received a PhD in United States history.

== Career ==
External videos
- A historian's Brief But Spectacular take on understanding the past to live a better future, Brief But Spectacular, PBS NewsHour, 3:38, February 5, 2021

In 1998, Berry became a professor of history and African American studies at Arizona State University. In 2000, she joined the history faculty at Michigan State University, and in 2010 she moved to the University of Texas at Austin, where she was affiliated with the history department and the department of African and African Diaspora Studies. In 2018 she was named Oliver H. Radkey Regents Professor of History and in 2019, she became associate dean of the graduate school at the University of Texas at Austin. In 2022, she became the Michael Douglas Dean of Humanities and Fine Arts.

=== Research ===
Berry published her first book, Swing the Sickle for the Harvest is Ripe: Gender and Slavery in Antebellum Georgia, in 2007. Through a comparison of Glynn County, Georgia and Wilkes County, Georgia during the early 19th century, Berry studies the relationship between the idea of skilled labor and gender in understanding enslaved peoples' work, and more broadly she examines the relationship between enslaved peoples' labor and their family and community relations. She contrasts the effects of the more closed system in Glynn County, which was more restrictive for the mobility of enslaved people but reinforced stronger and more stable family bonds, with the more open system of Wilkes County. She describes these systems through a detailed social and economic micro-history of the two counties.

In 2017, Berry published the book The Price for their Pound of Flesh: The Value of the Enslaved, from Womb to Grave, in the Building of a Nation. In The Price for their Pound of Flesh, Berry studies the economic history of slavery in the United States, examining how a price was assigned to the bodies of enslaved people in America from before they were born until after they died. Berry proposes four types of value that an enslaved person could hold: their assessed value, as determined by others for the purposes of accounting and sale; their market value, which was a function of local demand; their soul value, derived from inherent spiritual self-worth and reinforced by familial and communal connections; and their ghost value, evaluated by body brokers who engaged in the sale of human cadavers. Through this categorisation scheme, Berry is able to produce an economic history which is not completely centered on the market. Rather, by including the inherent self-value that many enslaved people held through the idea of soul value, Berry also produces an intellectual history of the thoughts, emotions, and ideas of enslaved people when considering their own value. Berry's focus on the factors that produced assigned value, as well as the value of unborn slaves, also makes a contribution to the historical literature on the violent role of gender and reproduction in the systems of American slavery.

In 2020, Berry published the book A Black Women's History of the United States with coauthor Kali Nicole Gross. The book examines the history of African American women through the narratives of eleven women who either had a significant impact on the history of the United States or whose lives reflect something about Black women's lives in American history. Two theses of the book are that African American women have been under-recognised for their core role in American history, and that the rights that have been won by African American women were gained primarily through their own struggle and activism. Specifically, Berry and Gross argue that political acts by African American women have crucially clarified the idea of liberty in American politics, exposed failures in mainstream approaches to democracy, and demonstrated how to correct those failures. Berry and Gross selected stories about historical figures who are not well-known, in what was described in Kirkus Reviews as a "wide-ranging search-and-rescue mission for black female activists, trailblazers, and others who have left a mark". A Black Women's History of the United States was listed as one of "the 10 books to read in February" of 2019 by The Washington Post, as well as one of "the 22 most anticipated books of February 2020" by Bustle magazine.

Berry was a co-editor of two more books: Slavery and Freedom in Savannah (2014) and Sexuality & Slavery: Reclaiming Intimate Histories in the Americas (2018). Berry's work has been cited, or she has been interviewed, in news outlets like The New York Times, The Washington Post, and NPR.

== Selected works ==
- Swing the Sickle for the Harvest is Ripe: Gender and Slavery in Antebellum Georgia (2007)
- The Price for their Pound of Flesh: The Value of the Enslaved, from Womb to Grave, in the Building of a Nation (2017)
- A Black Women's History of the United States, with Kali Nicole Gross (2020)

== See also ==
- Black Women Syllabus
