= Kali Nicole Gross =

American historian

- Education: Cornell University; University of Pennsylvania
- Scientific career
- Fields: History; African-American studies
- Workplaces: Princeton University; Drexel University; Schomburg Center for Research in Black Culture; Rutgers University; Emory University

Kali Nicole Gross is an American historian. She is an African American Studies professor at Emory University. She is also a Distinguished Lecturer of the Organization of American Historians, and the 2019–2021 National Publications Director of the Association of Black Women Historians. She is an expert on the experiences of African American women in the United States criminal justice system in the late 1800s and early 1900s. She has written about how these experiences reflect the roles of race and gender in late nineteenth-century urban America, particularly Philadelphia.

== Education and positions ==
Gross attended Cornell University, where she graduated with a BA degree. She obtained an MA and a PhD from the University of Pennsylvania. She then spent a year as a postdoctoral fellow at Princeton University, after which she joined the history faculty at Drexel University, where she became the Director of the Africana Studies Program.

In 2007 Gross was a scholar-in-residence at the Schomburg Center for Research in Black Culture. In 2014 and 2015, she was a Public Voices Fellow for The Op-Ed Project. She became a professor at Emory University in 2020. Gross was the National Publications Director for the Association of Black Women Historians during 2019–2021, and a Distinguished Lecturer for the Organization of American Historians.

== Research ==
In 2006, Gross published the book Colored Amazons: Crime, Violence, and Black Women in the City of Brotherly Love, 1880-1910. In Colored Amazons, Gross studies the crimes, persecution, and incarceration of African American women in Philadelphia at the end of the 19th century and the beginning of the 20th century, in the period 1880 to 1910, using historical records like incarceration data and trial transcripts. Gross argues that ideas of black women's crimes and their motivations were constructed both by perpetrators of crimes and by the state; some African American women broke the law as a means to gain personal autonomy, while the state promoted ideas about crimes by black women to reinforce the position of the white middle-class in Philadelphia. Gross studies how African American women who broke the law in this period often used crime as a method to resolve restrictions or violence that they faced due to racial discrimination, gender discrimination, or the interaction between those forces. She also traces the construction of white supremacist stereotypes that portrayed African American women as being inherently inclined towards criminality or violence (the "Colored Amazons" stereotype for which the book is named), and she examines the role of Cesare Lombroso's theories about the heritability of criminality in promoting those stigmas. Gross connects these stereotypes to the burgeoning feminist discourse of post-Reconstruction America, and she shows that racial antagonism was prevalent in Philadelphia despite the egalitarian Quaker and liberal democratic founding ideals of the city. Colored Amazons was reviewed as being a timely contribution to an under-studied historical narrative, because when it was written African American women were over-represented in the American criminal justice system, and were the fastest-growing prison population in the United States. Colored Amazons received the 2005 John Hope Franklin Center Manuscript Prize, and the 2006 Letitia Woods Brown Memorial Book Award from the Association of Black Women Historians.

Gross was also the author of the 2016 book Hannah Mary Tabbs and the Disembodied Torso: A Tale of Race, Sex, and Violence in America. In Hannah Mary Tabbs and the Disembodied Torso, Gross uses archival sources to reconstruct the details of the sensational 1887 murder trial of Hannah Mary Tabbs and her neighbor George Wilson, and to more deeply understand the racial and gender dynamics that were at play in the case and in how it was publicly covered. After an unknown victim's torso was discovered and Tabbs and Wilson were identified as murder suspects, the case became a national news story. Gross argues that the case received national interest partly because the racial identity of the victim was not immediately obvious (the victim was later revealed to be Silas Wakefield Gaines, who was a multiracial person), and so the case did not fit neatly into certain prevalent racial narratives about violent crime. Gross uses the murder case to investigate the social history of Philadelphia in the 1880s, producing what the historian Georgina Hickey called "a nuanced exploration of the meaning of race and gender in late nineteenth-century urban America". Hannah Mary Tabbs and the Disembodied Torso won the 2017 Hurston/Wright Legacy Award for Nonfiction from the Hurston/Wright Foundation.

In 2020, Gross and her coauthor Daina Ramey Berry published the book A Black Women's History of the United States. The book examines the history of African American women through the narratives of eleven women who either had a significant impact on the history of the United States or whose lives reflect something about Black women's lives in American history. Two theses of the book are that African American women have been under-recognised for their core role in American history, and that the rights that have been won by African American women were gained primarily through their own struggle and activism. Specifically, Gross and Berry argue that political acts by African American women have crucially clarified the idea of liberty in American politics, exposed failures in mainstream approaches to democracy, and demonstrated how to correct those failures. Gross and Berry selected stories about historical figures who are not well-known, in what was described in Kirkus Reviews as a "wide-ranging search-and-rescue mission for black female activists, trailblazers, and others who have left a mark". A Black Women's History of the United States was listed as one of "the 10 books to read in February" of 2019 by The Washington Post, as well as one of "the 22 most anticipated books of February 2020" by Bustle.

Gross's work has been cited, or she has been interviewed, in media outlets including The Washington Post, The Philadelphia Inquirer, WNYC, and Time.

== Selected works ==
- Colored Amazons: Crime, Violence, and Black Women in the City of Brotherly Love, 1880-1910 (2006)
- Hannah Mary Tabbs and the Disembodied Torso: A Tale of Race, Sex, and Violence in America (2016)
- A Black Women's History of the United States, with Daina Ramey Berry (2020)
- Vengeance Feminism: The Power of Black Women's Fury in Lawless Times (2024)
