= NAACP Image Award for Outstanding Literary Work – Youth/Teens =

Young adult literary award from the NAACP

This article lists the winners and nominees for the NAACP Image Award for Outstanding Literary Work, Youth/Teens.

== Winners and finalists ==
Award winners and finalists
Year	Book	Author	Result	Ref.
2007	Letters to a Young Brother	Hill Harper	Winner	
2007	Copper Sun	Sharon M. Draper	Finalist	
2007	Freedom Walkers: The Story of the Montgomery Bus Boycott	Russell Freedman	Finalist	
2007	Maya Angelou	Donna Brown Agins	Finalist	
2007	Superwoman’s Child	J. L. Woodson	Finalist	
2008	More Than Entertainers: An Inspirational Black Career Guide	Charles B. Schooler, illus. by Gary Young	Winner	
2008	Body Drama	Nancy Redd	Finalist	
2008	Center for Cartoon Studies Presents: Satchel Paige: Striking Out Jim Crow	James Sturm, illus. by Rich Tommaso	Finalist	
2008	Divine Confidential	Jacquelin Thomas	Finalist	
2008	The Shadow Speaker	Nnedi Okorafor-Mbachu	Finalist	
2009	Letters to a Young Sister: Define Your Destiny	Hill Harper	Winner	
2010	Michelle Obama: Meet the First Lady	David Bergen Brophy	Winner	
2010	Claudette Colvin: Twice Toward Justice	Phillip Hoose	Finalist	
2010	Just Another Hero	Sharon Draper	Finalist	
2010	Mare’s War	Tanita S. Davis	Finalist	
2010	Rock and the River	Kekla Magoon	Finalist	
2011	Condoleezza Rice: A Memoir of My Extraordinary, Ordinary Family and Me	Condoleezza Rice	Winner	
2012	Jesse Owens: I Always Loved Running	Jeff Burlingame	Winner	
2012	Eliza’s Freedom Road: An Underground Railroad Diary	Jerdine Nolen	Finalist	
2012	Camo Girl	Kekla Magoon	Finalist	
2012	Planet Middle School	Nikki Grimes	Finalist	
2012	Kick	Walter Dean Myers	Finalist	
2013	Obama Talks Back: Global Lessons - A Dialogue With America’s Young Leaders	Barack Obama and Gregory Reed	Winner	
2013	The Diary Of B. B. Bright, Possible Princess	Alice Randall and Caroline Randall Williams	Finalist	
2013	The Mighty Miss Malone	Christopher Paul Curtis	Finalist	
2013	Fire in the Streets	Kekla Magoon	Finalist	
2013	Pinned	Sharon G. Flake	Finalist	
2014	Courage Has No Color: The True Story of the Triple Nickles: America’s First Black Paratroopers	Tanya Lee Stone	Winner	
2014	Serafina’s Promise	Ann E. Burg	Finalist	
2014	Raising the Bar	Gabrielle Douglas	Finalist	
2014	God’s Graffiti: Inspiring Stories For Teens	Romal J. Tune	Finalist	
2014	Invasion	Walter Dean Myers	Finalist	
2015	Brown Girl Dreaming	Jacqueline Woodson	Winner	
2015	The Red Pencil	Andrea Davis Pinkney	Finalist	
2015	Revolution	Deborah Wiles	Finalist	
2015	The Freedom Summer Murders	Don Mitchell	Finalist	
2015	Because They Marched: The People’s Campaign for Voting Rights That Changed America	Russell Freedman	Finalist	
2016	X: A Novel	Ilyasah Shabazz	Winner	
2016	Rhythm Ride: A Road Trip Through the Motown Sound	Andrea Davis Pinkney	Finalist	
2016	Untwine	Edwidge Danticat	Finalist	
2016	You Are Wonderfully Made: 12 Life-Changing Principles for Teen Girls to Embrace	Gwen Richardson and Sylvia Richardson	Finalist	
2016	Stella by Starlight	Sharon M. Draper	Finalist	
2017	As Brave as You	Jason Reynolds	Winner	
2017	Riding Chance	Christine Kendall	Finalist	
2017	Same But Different: Teen Life on the Autism Express	Holly Robinson Peete, Ryan Elizabeth Peete, and RJ Peete	Finalist	
2017	The Hero Two Doors Down: Based on the True Story of Friendship Between a Boy and a Baseball Legend	Sharon Robinson	Finalist	
2017	Two Naomis	Olugbemisola Rhuday-Perkovich and Audrey Vernick	Finalist	
2018	Clayton Byrd Goes Underground	Rita Williams-Garcia, with Frank Morrison (illus.)	Winner	
2018	Allegedly	Tiffany D. Jackson	Finalist	
2018	Long Way Down	Jason Reynolds	Finalist	
2018	Solo	Kwame Alexander, with Mary Rand Hess	Finalist	
2018	The Hate U Give	Angie Thomas	Finalist	
2019	Harbor Me	Jacqueline Woodson	Winner	
2019	A Very Large Expanse of Sea	Tahereh Mafi	Finalist	
2019	Chasing King’s Killer: The Hunt for Martin Luther King, Jr.’s Assassin	James L. Swanson	Finalist	
2019	The Journey of Little Charlie	Christopher Paul Curtis	Finalist	
2019	We Are Not Yet Equal: Understanding our Racial Divide	Carol Anderson, with Tonya Bolden	Finalist	
2020	Around Harvard Square	Christopher John Farley	Winner	
2020	Her Own Two Feet: A Rwandan Girl’s Brave Fight to Walk	Meredith Davis and Rebeka Uwitonze	Finalist	
2020	Hot Comb	Ebony Flowers	Finalist	
2020	I’m Not Dying with You Tonight	Gilly Segal and Kimberly Jones	Finalist	
2020	The Forgotten Girl	India Hill Brown	Finalist	
2021	Before the Ever After	Jacqueline Woodson	Winner	
2021	Black Brother, Black Brother	Jewell Parker Rhodes	Finalist	
2021	Dear Justyce	Nic Stone	Finalist	
2021	Stamped: Racism, Antiracism, and You	Jason Reynolds	Finalist	
2021	This Is Your Time	Ruby Bridges	Finalist	
2022	Ace of Spades	Faridah Àbíké-Íyímídé	Winner	
2022	Happily Ever Afters	Elise Bryant	Finalist	
2022	The Cost of Knowing	Brittney Morris	Finalist	
2022	When You Look Like Us	Pamela N. Harris	Finalist	
2022	Wings of Ebony	J. Elle	Finalist	
2023	Cookies & Milk	Shawn Amos	Winner	
2023	Maybe an Artist	Liz Montague	Finalist	
2023	Inheritance: A Visual Poem	Elizabeth Acevedo	Finalist	
2023	Me and White Supremacy (Young Readers' Ed.)	Layla Saad	Finalist	
2023	Opening My Eyes Underwater: Essays on Hope, Humanity, and Our Hero Michelle Obama	Ashley Woodfolk	Finalist	
2024	Everyone’s Thinking It	Aleema Omotoni	Winner	
2024	Adia Kelbara and the Circle of Shamans	Isi Hendrix	Finalist	
2024	Eb & Flow	Kelly J. Baptist	Finalist	
2024	Fatima Tate Takes the Cake	Khadijah VanBrakle	Finalist	
2024	Friday I’m in Love	Camryn Garrett	Finalist	
2025	Brushed Between Cultures: A YA Coming of Age Novel Set in Brooklyn, New York	Samarra St. Hilaire	Winner	
2025	American Wings: Chicago’s Pioneering Black Aviators and the Race for Equality in the Sky	Sherri L. Smith and Elizabeth Wein	Finalist	
2025	Barracoon Adapted for Young Readers The Story of the Last Black Cargo	Zora Neale Hurston, Ibram X. Kendi, Jazzmen Lee-Johnson	Finalist	
2025	Black Star: The Door of No Return	Kwame Alexander	Finalist	
2025	Clutch Time: A Shot Clock Novel	Caron Butler and Justin A. Reynolds	Finalist	
2026	Nic Blake and the Remarkables: The Book of Anansi	Angie Thomas	Winner	
2026	(S)Kin	Ibi Zoboi	Finalist	
2026	The Scammer	Tiffany D. Jackson	Finalist	
2026	The Story of My Anger	Jasminne Mendez	Finalist	
2026	Through Our Teeth	Pamela N. Harris	Finalist	
