= Look Both Ways (novel) =

2019 novel by Jason Reynolds

Look Both Ways: A Tale Told in Ten Blocks
- Hardcover edition
- Author: Jason Reynolds
- Illustrator: Alexander Nabaum
- Language: English
- Published: October 8, 2019
- Publisher: Atheneum Books
- Publication place: United States
- Media type: Print (paperback, hardcover)
- Award: National Book Award for Young People's Literature finalist (2019), Coretta Scott King Award honor book (2020), Carnegie Medal recipient (2021)
- ISBN: 9781481438285
- OCLC: 1091293098

Look Both Ways: A Tale Told in Ten Blocks is a young adult novel written by Jason Reynolds, illustrated by Alexander Nabaum, and published October 8, 2019 by Atheneum Books. The book is a New York Times best seller, National Book Award for Young People's Literature finalist (2019), Coretta Scott King Award honor book (2020), and Carnegie Medal recipient (2021).

== Reception ==
Look Both Ways is a New York Times best seller.

The book received starred reviews from Publishers Weekly, School Library Journal, Booklist, Horn Book, and Kirkus, as well as a positive review from Shelf Awareness.

Booklist's Ronny Khuri referred to the book as "storytelling at its finest, a true masterpiece.."

Kirkus Reviews noted, "The entire collection brims with humor, pathos, and the heroic struggle to grow up." Publishers Weekly agreed with the sentiment, stating that "each story rings with emotional authenticity and empathy, and not a small amount of rib-tickling humor offsets the sometimes bittersweet realities of the characters’ lives."

Kyla Paterno of Shelf Awareness called the book "an unconventional, clever exploration of the secret trials and tribulations of middle schoolers," noting that the "connected and intertwining tales are not neatly contained nor completed at the end, but rather left ambiguous, allowing readers to decide what happens next."

The audiobook, narrated by Heather Alicia Simms, Bahni Turpin, and January LaVoy and others, received a starred review from Booklist, who noted, [T]he readers reflect [the characters'] bravado and ethnicity. They also give them vulnerability and surprising grit as they face everyday problems."

"Each of Reynolds's characters is so highly developed and memorable that they are easily noticed as background players in the others' vignettes. " Shelf Awareness

Look Both Ways was named one of the best children's books of the year by Kirkus Reviews, NPR, Chicago Public Library, The New York Times, TIME, The Today Show, the Center for the Study of Multicultural Children's Literature, School Library Journal, and Publishers Weekly.

=== Accolades ===
Year	Accolade	Result	Ref.
2019	Booklist Editors' Choice for Youth Audio	Selection	
2019	Booklist Editors' Choice for Books for Youth	Selection	
2019	National Book Award for Young People's Literature	Finalist	
2020	Association for Library Service to Children's Notable Children's Books	Selection	
2020	Association for Library Service to Children's Notable Children's Recordings	Selection	
2020	Coretta Scott King Award for Author	Honor	
2020	Judy Lopez Memorial Award for Children's Literature	Winner	
2020	YALSA's Quick Picks for Reluctant Young Adult Readers	Selection	
2021	Carnegie Medal	Winner	
2021	YALSA's Amazing Audiobooks for Young Adults	Selection	

Awards
Preceded by Lark	Carnegie Medal recipient 2021	Succeeded by October, October
