= Lu (novel) =

2018 novel by Jason Reynolds

- Author: Jason Reynolds
- Language: English
- Series: Track
- Published: October 24, 2018
- Publisher: Atheneum Books
- Publication place: United States
- Media type: Print (paperback, hardcover), Audio
- Pages: 224
- ISBN: 9781481450249 Hardcover edition
- Preceded by: Sunny

Lu is a young adult novel by Jason Reynolds, published October 23, 2018, by Atheneum. It is the fourth book in Reynold's Track series, preceded by Ghost (2016), Patina (2017), and Sunny (2018).

== Reception ==
Lu received starred reviews from Booklist, as well as positive reviews from School Library Journal and Kirkus.

Booklist's Becca Worthington noted, "Virtually every subplot is a moving moral lesson on integrity, humility, or reconciliation." Kirkus echoed the sentiment, saying, "emphasizes the triumph of healing and unity" and "showcas[es] children’s power to effect true communal change."

Lu is a Junior Library Guild book.

Awards for Lu
Year	Award	Result	Ref.
2019	CCBC Choices Choice: Fiction for Children	Selection	
2019	YALSA's Amazing Audiobooks for Young Adults	Top 10	
2019	YALSA's Quick Picks for Reluctant Young Adult Readers	Top 10	
2019	ALSC's Notable Children's Recordings	Selection	
2019	Booklist's Best Sports Books for Youth	Top 10	
