= Ghost (Reynolds novel) =

2016 novel by Jason Reynolds

- Author: Jason Reynolds
- Language: English
- Series: Track
- Published: August 30, 2016
- Publisher: Atheneum Books
- Publication place: United States
- Media type: Print (paperback, hardcover)
- Pages: 180
- Awards: Cybils Award (2016); Charlotte Huck Award (2017); Rebecca Caudill Young Readers' Book Award (2016); William Allen White Children's Book Award
- ISBN: 9781481450157

Ghost is a young adult novel by Jason Reynolds, published August 30, 2016 by Atheneum Books. It is the first book of Reynolds' Track series, followed by Patina (2017), Sunny (2018), Lu (2018), and Coach (2025).

Ghost was a New York Times best seller and National Book Award for Young People's Literature finalist.

== Plot ==
A young boy named Castle Cranshaw, who calls himself "Ghost", enjoys fun facts and sunflower seeds, and dreams of playing basketball some day.

Ghost buys a pack a sunflower seeds from Mr. Charles, the owner of a nearby store. He walks to a bus stop across the street from a gym, where he watches people tiring themselves on treadmills (which he finds funny, as the exasperation of the gymgoers is entertaining), while eating sunflower seeds. While eating sunflower seeds, he thinks about the night when he and his mother ran away from his alcohol-addicted father.

== Reception ==
Ghost was a New York Times best seller.

The book received starred reviews from Booklist, Publishers Weekly, and Kirkus, as well as positive reviews from The Bulletin of the Center for Children’s Books and Horn Book Magazine.

Reviewing Ghost in The New York Times, Kate Messner said that in his title character, Reynolds has created a protagonist "whose journey is so genuine that he's worthy of a place alongside Ramona and Joey Pigza on the bookshelves where our most beloved, imperfect characters live."

The audiobook, narrated by Guy Lockard, received a starred review from School Library Journal.

Kirkus, New York Public Library, Publishers Weekly, School Library Journal, the New Atlantic Independent Booksellers Association, and the Center for

The Study of Multicultural Children's Literature named it one of the best books of 2016.

Accolades for Ghost
Year	Accolade	Result	Ref.
2016	Cybils Award for Middle Grade Fiction	Winner	
2016	Junior Library Guild book list	Selection	
2016	Kirkus Reviews' Best Books of the Year	Selection	
2016	Kirkus Prize for Young Readers	Nominee	
2016	National Book Award for Young People's Literature	Finalist	
2016	The New York Times Notable Children's Books	Selection	
2017	Booklist: Diverse Fiction for Youth	Top 10	
2017	American Library Association's Amazing Audiobooks for Young Adults	Selection	
2017	American Library Association's Best Fiction for Young Adults	Top 10	
2017	Association for Library Service to Children's Notable Children's Books	Selection	
2017	NCTE Charlotte Huck Award	Winner	
2017	Odyssey Award	Honor	
2017	YALSA's Quick Picks for Reluctant Young Adult Readers	Selection	
2018	Vermont Golden Dome Book Award	Nominee	
2018-2019	Indian Paintbrush Book Award	Finalist	
2018-2019	Oregon Battle of the Books	Nominee	
2018-2019	South Carolina Junior Book Award	Winner	
2018-2019	Virginia Readers’ Choice Award for Middle School	Winner	
2019	North Carolina Young Adult Book Award for Middle School	Winner	
2019	ORCA Award for Middle School	Winner	
2019	Rebecca Caudill Young Readers' Book Award	Winner	
2019	William Allen White Children's Book Award for Grade 6-8	Winner	
