= Patina (novel) =

1998 novel by Jason Reynolds

- Author: Jason Reynolds
- Language: English
- Series: Track
- Published: August 29, 1998
- Publisher: Atheneum Books
- Publication place: United States
- Media type: Print (paperback, hardcover), Audio
- ISBN: 9781481450188
- Preceded by: Ghost
- Followed by: Sunny, Lu

Patina is a young adult novel by Jason Reynolds, published August 29, 2017 by Atheneum. It is the second book in Reynold's Track series, preceded by Ghost (2016) and followed by Sunny (2018) and Lu (2018).

Patina is a New York Times best seller and Junior Library Guild book.

== Reception ==
Patina is a New York Times best seller and Junior Library Guild book.

The book received starred reviews from Booklist, The Horn Book, and Kirkus, as well as positive reviews from Bulletin of the Center for Children’s Books and Shelf Awareness.

Reviewers called Patina "stellar," as well as "complete, complex, and sparkling."

Shelf Awareness's Siân Gaetano complimented Reynolds creation of the book's main character, Patina, stating, "It is simply impossible to not love Patina ... Charming, hardworking and a dedicated sister, runner and student, Patina is a sympathetic and wholly sympathetic character who finds her own peace by learning to work with others."

The Chicago Public Library, Los Angeles Public Library, Kirkus, and Horn Book named Patina one of the best young adult books of 2017. School Library Journal and The New York Times named it one of the best middle grade chapter books of the year.

Awards and honors for Patina
Year	Award	Result	Ref.
1998	Booklist's Best Sports Books for Youth	Top 10	
1998	The New York Times Notable Children's Books	Selection	
1999	ALSC's Notable Children's Books	Selection	
1999	ALSC's Notable Children's Recordings	Selection	
1999	Dorothy Canfield Fisher Children's Book Award	Nominee	
1999	International Literacy Association's Teachers' Choices	Selection	
1999	YALSA's Amazing Audiobooks for Young Adults	Selection	
1999	YALSA's Quick Picks for Reluctant Young Adult Readers	Top 10	
