= Long Way Down (book) =

2017 novel by Jason Reynolds

- Author: Jason Reynolds
- Publisher: Simon and Schuster
- Publication date: October 24, 2017
- Pages: 306
- Awards: Printz Honor Book, Coretta Scott King author award, Newbery Honor
- ISBN: 978-1-48143-825-4
- OCLC: 972216719

Long Way Down is a young adult supernatural drama novel in verse by Jason Reynolds and published October 24, 2017, by Atheneum Books. The book was longlisted for the National Book Award and was named a Printz Honor Book, Coretta Scott King Honor Book, and Newbery Medal Honor Book, alongside other awards and positive reviews.

A graphic novel edition of the book, illustrated by Danica Novgorodoff, was published October 13, 2020.

== Background ==
Reynolds held the idea for Long Way Down for years before finally writing it. In 2003 when Reynolds was 19, he learned that a friend had been murdered. Speaking of the moment, he said he and his friends felt "an anger, a pain, like a cancer metastasizing by the second, spreading around us and through us. We knew his death had changed us chemically, and that we could do, perhaps, what we never knew we could do before. Kill." Reynolds continued behind,

Long Way Down is meant to help us all recognize the weight of it. Not just the weight of gun violence, but the weight of anger bearing down on fragile backs. The weight of slow-burning psychosis. The weight of community codes, family dynamic, tradition. The weight of The Rules. The weight of guaranteed cold cases. The weight of fear, and the feeling of insignificance. The weight of dehumanization, of being stripped of personhood because of instinctual moments and feelings, unfettered. The weight of so many children—more specifically, so many black and brown children—jumping on this soiled American mattress, poverty, illiteracy, and prejudice serving as the coils.

== Plot ==
William Holloman is ready to get revenge on the person who murdered his older brother, Shawn. As Will rides the elevator down from his eighth-floor apartment, a new person, who is dead, gets on on each floor and tells a story about their lives, all connected to three rules of the neighborhood:

1. Don't cry.
2. Don't snitch.
3. Get revenge.

Most of the ghosts' stories revolve around that third rule, where in one person died because they killed someone who killed someone connected to their family, creating a continuous cycle of death.

The bulk of the story takes place over the course of a minute, although the opening takes place over an unspecified number of days.

== Reception ==
Long Way Down was a New York Times best seller and Junior Library Guild selection.

The book received starred reviews from Booklist, Bulletin of the Center for Children's Books, Horn Book, Kirkus, Publishers Weekly, and School Library Journal, as well as positive reviews from Shelf Awareness.

In reviews, the book was called "astonishing," "a tour de force," "powerful," and "intense."

Kirkus, Publishers Weekly, the New York Public Library, the Chicago Public Library, Entertainment Weekly, Vulture, Paste, BuzzFeed, Horn Book, and School Library Journal named Long Way Down one of the best young adult books of the year. The Washington Post included it in their list of "50 Notable Works of Fiction 2017."

TIME added it to their "100 Best YA Books of All Time" list, and Buzzfeed named it one of the best 30 young adult books of the decade.

=== Awards and honors ===
Year	Award	Result	Ref.
2017	The Bulletin of the Center for Children’s Books Blue Ribbon	Selection	
2017	Goodreads Choice Award for Poetry	Nominee	
2017	Los Angeles Times Book Prize for Young Adult Literature	Winner	
2018	Amelia Elizabeth Walden Award	Finalist	
2018	American Library Association's Amazing Audiobooks for Young Adults	Selection	
2018	Association for Library Service to Children Notable Children's Books	Selection	
2018	Capitol Choices for Ages Fourteen and Up	Selection	
2018	Cooperative Children's Book Center Choice for Fiction for Young Adults	Selection	
2018	Coretta Scott King Award	Honor	
2018	Cybils Award for Poetry	Winner	
2018	Indies Choice Book Award for Young Adult	Honor	
2018	International Literacy Association's Young Adults' Choices	Selection	
2018	Newbery Medal	Honor	
2018	Michael L. Printz Award	Honor	
2018	Odyssey Award	Honor	
2018	Walter Dean Myers Award	Winner	
2018	Edgar Award for Best Young Adult Fiction	Winner	
2018	NAACP Image Award for Outstanding Literary Work – Youth/Teens	Shortlist	
2018	National Book Award for Young People's Literature	Longlist	
2018	Michigan Library Association's Thumbs Up! Award	Top 10	
2018	YALSA's Best Fiction for Young Adults	Top 10	
2018	YALSA's Quick Picks for Reluctant Young Adult Readers	Top 10	
2018	YALSA's Teens' Top Ten	Top 10	
2019	Carnegie Medal	Nominee	
2019	Oklahoma Library Association's Sequoyah Book Award for High School	Nominee	
2019	Rhode Island Teen Book Award	Honor	
2019-2020	South Carolina Association of School Librarians' Young Adult Book Award	Nominee	
2020	Evergreen Teen Book Award for Middle School	Nominee	
2021	Rebecca Caudill Young Readers' Book Award	Nominee	

== Graphic novel ==
A graphic novel edition of the book, illustrated by Danica Novgorodoff, was published October 13, 2020, by Atheneum. This graphic novel was the 2022 winner of the Kate Greenaway Medal.

Writing for Horn Book, Patrick Gall applauded the imagery, noting that

artful decisions offer readers insight into Will’s emotional state at any given moment. The layered, fragmented layouts found across many spreads have potent impact, along with stylistic touches such as Polaroid photos, video screens, and storyboards seamlessly substituted for panels. Scenes of violence are starkly portrayed, including a double-page image of Shawn’s dead body; however, the complex and unjust reality of Will’s position remains front and center, in stark focus.

In 2021, the American Library Association selected Long Way Down: The Graphic Novel as one of their Great Graphic Novels for Teens.
