= Camryn Garrett =

American writer (born 2000)

- Born: 2000 (age 25–26)
- Occupation: Writer
- Years active: 2013-present
- Notable work: Full Disclosure

Camryn Garrett (born 2000) is an American writer. Her work has appeared in outlets such as Rookie and MTV. She published her first novel, Full Disclosure, in 2019.

== Career ==
Garrett began writing professionally at 13 as a reporter for Time for Kids. She has published writing in Huffington Post, Rookie, and MTV.

She wrote her first novel when she was 15 years old. She was turned down by publishers because it was too similar to Angie Thomas's The Hate U Give.

Garrett wrote the first draft of Full Disclosure in 2016 during National Novel Writing Month. She was inspired to write the story because she wanted to understand the lives of young people living with HIV. She stated that she hoped to "shine a light on the realities of living with HIV and to start to unpick some of the stigma that still exists." The book also depicts sexually active teenagers and those with queer families.

Full Disclosure tells the story of Simone, a black teenage girl born with HIV. It was released October 29, 2019 by Knopf. Publishers Weekly wrote in a review, "But the idea that even purportedly open-minded Bay Area parents freak out about the presence of an HIV-positive student feels all too believable, and readers will root for sympathetic Simone in this frankly sex-positive debut." Kirkus' review of the book stated: "Simone's story will educate readers about the intricacies of living fully with HIV and controlling your narrative. The primary and most secondary characters are well developed, and the pace is spot-on."

Garrett's sophomore novel, Off the Record, was published by Knopf in 2021.

Her third book, Friday I'm in Love, was published in 2023. It was a finalist for the NAACP Image Award for Outstanding Literary Work – Youth/Teens.

=== Accolades ===
- 21 Under 21, Teen Vogue (2018)
- College Women of the Year, Glamour (2019)

== Personal life ==
Garrett is an undergraduate film student at NYU Tisch.

== Publications ==
- Full Disclosure. Knopf Books for Young Readers. 2019. ISBN 978-1984829955.
- Off the Record. Knopf Books for Young Readers. 2021. ISBN 978-1984829993.
- Friday I'm in Love. Knopf Books for Young Readers. 2023. ISBN 978-0593435113.
- In Between Days. Disney Hyperion. 2026. ISBN 978-1368114356.
- The Forgotten Summer of Seneca. Harry N. Abrams. 2025. ISBN 978-1419773334.
