= Garden Heights =

Garden Heights may refer to:

- Garden Heights, Rocky View County, Alberta, a locality in Rocky View County, Alberta
- Garden Heights, Strathcona County, a locality in Strathcona County, Alberta
- Garden Heights, a fictional location in The Hate U Give
