= Sunny (novel) =

2018 novel by Jason Reynolds

- Author: Jason Reynolds
- Language: English
- Series: Track
- Published: April 10, 2018
- Publisher: Atheneum Books
- Publication place: United States
- Media type: Print (paperback, hardcover), Audio
- ISBN: 9781481450218
- Preceded by: Ghost, Patina
- Followed by: Lu (novel)

Sunny is a young adult novel by Jason Reynolds, published April 10, 2018, by Atheneum. It is the third book in Reynolds' Track series, preceded by Ghost (2016), Patina (2018), and followed by Lu (2018).

== Reception ==
Sunny received starred reviews from Kirkus Reviews and Booklist. Booklist wrote, "Reynolds is on a run almost unparalleled in YA, and this standout series will continue to be in demand." They further indicated that "this series continues to provide beautiful opportunities for discussion about viewpoint, privilege, loss, diversity of experience, and exactly how much we don’t know about those around us." Kirkus called the it "another literary pacesetter that will leave Reynolds’ readers wanting more."

The Horn Book also provided a positive review.

Sunny is a Junior Library Guild book.

Awards for Lu
Year	Award	Result	Ref.
2018	Booklist Editors' Choice: Books for Youth	Selection	
2018	Booklist's Best Sports Books for Youth	Top 10	
2019	CCBC Choices Choice: Fiction for Children	Selection	
2019	YALSA's Amazing Audiobooks for Young Adults	Top 10	
2019	YALSA's Quick Picks for Reluctant Young Adult Readers	Top 10	
2019	ALSC's Notable Children's Recordings	Selection	
