= Ain't Burned All the Bright =

2022 illustrated young-adult book

- Official cover
- Author: Jason Reynolds
- Illustrator: Jason Griffin
- Language: English
- Genre: Young-adult fiction; Prose poem
- Published: January 11, 2022
- Publisher: Atheneum/Caitlyn Dlouhy Books
- Publication place: United States
- Pages: 384
- ISBN: 978-1-5344-3946-7

Ain't Burned All the Bright is a 2022 young-adult picture book written by Jason Reynolds, with artwork by Jason Griffin. Narrated by an African-American youth who copes along with his family amid the early months of COVID-19, the work is set to sparse, first-person poetic prose and stylistic illustrations, and is divided into three sections called "Breaths".

Reynolds and Griffin, who previously collaborated on 2009's My Name Is Jason. Mine Too: Our Story, Our Way, returned between summer 2020 and early 2021 to work on this title. Reynolds wrote the first draft of the text in minutes, while Griffin crafted the illustrations within Moleskine notebooks. Published in January 2022 by Atheneum/Simon & Schuster's Caitlyn Dlouhy Books, Ain't Burned All the Bright was well-acclaimed and became a Caldecott Honoree in 2023.

== Synopsis ==
A male African-American youth (who serves as the narrator) and his family cope with the United States' societal crises during the early months of the COVID-19 era.

== Style and layout ==
Across 384 illustrated pages, only three sentences comprise Jason Reynolds' text; the three sections are referred to as Breath One, Breath Two, and Breath Three, all told in the first person. Several pages are left blank or blacked out. At the end of the work, Reynolds and Griffin interview each other on their collaborative efforts.

== Development ==
At the time [of our phone call], I was trying to figure, how do you sum up 2020? I couldn't find the language until he [Griffin] said those words, and then I realized, of course, this was a year of suffocation.

— Jason Reynolds, School Library Journal

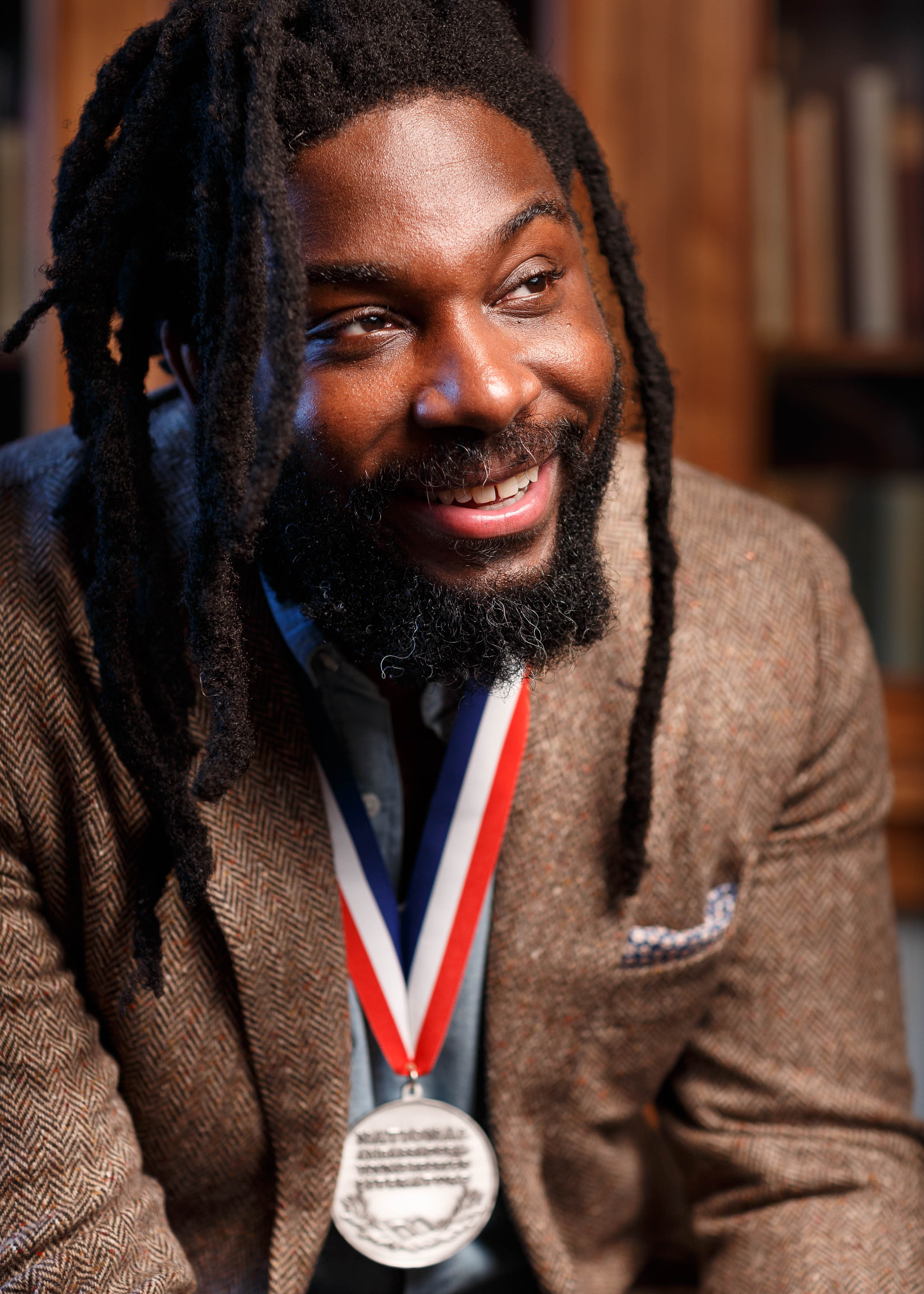
Reynolds (pictured in 2020) worked on Ain't Burned All the Bright with collaborator and friend Jason Griffin.

Author Jason Reynolds was previously a Newbery Honor recipient in 2018; his friend and illustrator partner Jason Griffin provided the book's "mixed-media collages". The two previously teamed up for 2009's My Name Is Jason. Mine Too: Our Story. Our Way.

Work on Ain't Burned All the Bright began in summer 2020, when Reynolds and Griffin discussed their ideas via phone. During that time, Griffin was sketching out imagery in Moleskine notebooks depicting the early months of COVID-19, and referred to the Reynolds work as "an 'oxygen mask' that was helping him break free and create when he felt blocked." Meanwhile, Reynolds wrote the text—consisting of "one single run-on sentence"—in only a few minutes, and gave it to Griffin the day afterward. This preceded a long round of editing wherein he removed various colons and semicolons from the text so that Griffin could improvise as he pleased. As Reynolds explained his enthusiasm:

[That feeling I had:] Historically, it means one is filled with God, entheos. There's that feeling of, "I know something is happening. I know it is a visceral expulsion because whatever it is that's in me finally decided that it's ready."

Griffin illustrated the first ten spreads of the book in one month while at home, using material from his notebooks alongside new art. He likened the collaboration between both of them to jazz musicians improvising at jam sessions. "Neither is illustrating the other," he told School Library Journal in July 2022. "His writing, it's not about my art; and my art, it's not about his writing. We're taking a central theme, and we're riffing."

In early 2021, Reynolds and Griffin sent their PDF manuscript—350 to 400 pages in length—to Caitlyn Dlouhy, after whom an imprint of Simon & Schuster was named. Though she admired their "genius", Dlouhy briefly rested on the work while pondering on what to do with it, then proceeded to bring "small finesses" to its pacing. She also chose the final name, Ain't Burned All the Bright, over the working titles Oxygen Mask and Three Breaths. The title Oxygen Mask was later used for the UK edition.

Simon & Schuster spent three months preparing the final book; other titles of its caliber took up to a year. Reynolds and Griffin settled with the publisher's art director Michael McCartney on the jacket's final design: The cover used one of the book's illustrations, "a hand holding a vibrant, orange flame"; the title written several times over (at McCartney's request); and the author's and illustrator's names in lowercase with a taped-on effect.

== Thematic analysis ==
Writing for The Washington Post, Nate Powell said: "Through art and words, Ain't Burned All the Bright looks at how we measure time — the book's stretched-out [text] echoes the reality of waiting indefinitely for justice, for progress, for a fulfillment of hollow promises. Insisting that possibility survives, even as every possibility now carries an asterisk." According to The Horn Book's Nicholl Denise Montgomery, the narrating youth "[tries] to grapple the confusion and fear of the double pandemic (COVID-19 and systemic racism) he is facing."

== Release and reception ==
Ain't Burned All the Bright was published by Atheneum/Simon & Schuster's Caitlyn Dlouhy Books imprint on January 11, 2022. On its first week of publication, the book was the tenth bestselling title on Publishers Weekly's Children's Fiction list.

Prior to publication, Ain't Burned received starred reviews from Booklist, Kirkus Reviews, and Publishers Weekly. As Booklist predicted, "There's nothing Reynolds can't do, and his readers know it. This creative, timely reflection will be particularly admired by teens seeking change." After its release, Powell hailed it as "an essential read for all ages", while Elizabeth Bush of The Bulletin of the Center for Children's Books said, "This powerful title may become the memory book for how we made it through troubled times." The School Library Journal gave it similar praise, adding that "[it] is permeated with so much comfort and hope as it leaves readers with the solace that togetherness brings."

In late June 2022, Ain't Burned won the Boston Globe–Horn Book Award in the Picture Book category for Griffin's illustrations. On January 30, 2023, the American Library Association (ALA) honored his work with a Caldecott Honor prize; the three other recipients were Berry Song (Michaela Goade), Choosing Brave (Janelle Washington), and Knight Owl (Christopher Denise). Between November 2022 and early 2023, it appeared on various best-of-2022 lists in The Washington Post, SLJ, and The Horn Book, while the Bulletin awarded it a 2022 Blue Ribbon in the Fiction category.
