= Stuntboy, in the Meantime =

2021 graphic novel by Jason Reynolds

- First edition cover
- Author: Jason Reynolds
- Illustrator: Raúl the Third
- Publisher: Atheneum
- Publication date: November 30, 2021
- ISBN: 978-1-5344-1816-5
- Followed by: Stuntboy, In-Between Time

Stuntboy, in the Meantime is a 2021 middle grade graphic novel written by Jason Reynolds and illustrated by Raúl the Third.

The novel was a 2021 Schneider Family Book Award honor book, and in 2023, the audiobook won an Audie Award and Odyssey Award.

== Plot ==
Portico, a young boy living in the massive complex Skylight Gardens, maintains a superhero identity as "Stuntboy". Accompanied by his best friend Zola Brawner, Portico explores in episodic adventures while struggling with severe anxiety (which he calls "frets"), bully Herbert Singletary the Worst, and his arguing parents.

== Reception ==
=== Reviews ===
Stuntboy, in the Meantime was well received by critics, including starred reviews from Booklist, The Horn Book Magazine, Kirkus Reviews, Publishers Weekly, and Shelf Awareness. It also received positive reviews from The Bulletin of the Center for Children's Books and The School Librarian.

The audiobook narrated by Guy Lockard and others also received a starred review from Booklist.

=== Awards and honors ===
Stuntboy, in the Meantime is a New York Times and IndieBound bestseller, and a Junior Library Guild book. Kirkus Reviews named it one of the best books of 2021.

The Stuntboy, in the Meantime audiobook was included in Booklist's 2021 "Booklist Editors' Choice: Youth Audio" list. In 2023, they included it on their list of the "Top 10 Mysteries and Thrillers for Youth on Audio" and the Association for Library Service to Children's included it on their Notable Children's Recordings list.

Awards for Stuntboy, in the Meantime
Year	Award	Result	Ref.
2022	Schneider Family Book Award for Middle Grade	Honor	
2023	Audie Award for Middle Grade Title	Winner	
2023	Odyssey Award for Children	Winner	
