= Refresh, Refresh =

Short story by Benjamin Percy

"Refresh, Refresh" is a short story written by American author Benjamin Percy. The story concerns the effects of the war in Iraq on two boys in a small town in Oregon where a Marine reserve battalion is based. Many of the men in the town, including their fathers, are fighting in Iraq during the story.

Refresh, Refresh was originally published in The Paris Review. The story won the Pushcart Prize for 2006 and was included in the anthology of short stories, Best American Short Stories 2006 (2006 editor Ann Patchett).

A collection of the same name, featuring the title story along with others, was published in 2007 by Graywolf Press.

The story was also the inspiration behind Danica Novgorodoff's graphic novel (adapted from the screenplay by James Ponsoldt).
