= Before the Ever After =

2020 novel by Jacqueline Woodson

- Cover of Before the Ever After
- Author: Jacqueline Woodson
- Language: English
- Genre: Middle-grade fiction, Novel in verse
- Publisher: Nancy Paulsen Books
- Publication date: September 1, 2020
- Publication place: United States
- Media type: Print (hardcover, paperback), Audiobook
- Awards: 2021 Coretta Scott King Author Award
- ISBN: 978-0-39-954543-6
- OCLC: 1141984564

Before the Ever After is a middle-grade novel in verse by Jacqueline Woodson, published September 1, 2020 by Nancy Paulsen Books.

== Reception ==
Before the Ever After received starred reviews from Kirkus, Booklist, School Library Journal, Horn Book, Publishers Weekly, and Shelf Awareness, as well as a positive review from The Bulletin of the Center for Children's Books.

The 2020, Booklist and Kirkus named Before the Ever After one of the best books of the year. The following year, the Association for Library Service to Children included it on their list of Notable Children's Books, and Young Adult Library Services Association named it among the year's Best Fiction for Young Adults.

The audiobook received a starred review from Booklist.

Before the Ever After Awards
Year	Award	Result	Ref.
2020	Goodreads Choice Award for Middle Grade & Children's	Nominee	
2021	Coretta Scott King Book Award for Author	Winner	
2021	NAACP Image Award for Outstanding Literary Work – Youth/Teens	Winner	
