= Stuntboy, In-Between Time =

2023 graphic novel by Jason Reynolds

- First edition cover
- Author: Jason Reynolds
- Illustrator: Raúl the Third
- Publisher: Caitlyn Dlouhy/Atheneum
- Publication date: August 29, 2023
- ISBN: 978-1-534-41822-6
- Preceded by: Stuntboy, in the Meantime

Stuntboy, In-Between Time is a 2023 graphic novel written by Jason Reynolds and illustrated by Raúl the Third.

== Reception ==
In a starred review, Booklist's John Peters called Stuntboy, In-Between Time "equally funny and tumultuous", while Kirkus Reviews referred to it as "fun and emotionally perceptive". Peters highlighted how "Reynolds adroitly weaves emotional business into the teeming tapestry of apartment houselife by surrounding his caped protagonist, still struggling with his parents’ recent separation, with a colorful cast depicted by Raúl the Third in typically snappy, dynamic flurries of motion on nearly every page." Similarly calling the novel "humorous and exciting",Shelf Awareness's Natasha Harris wrote, "Reynolds's text is accessible, providing a quick, entertaining read that directly covers topics of divorce, friendship, and anxiety. Raúl the Third's digital illustrations enhance the superhero tone with loose, sketchy lines that show movement; intentionally chosen pops of color in the grayscale art focus the eye on important details."

Also writing for Booklist, Ashley Young reviewed the audiobook narrated by Guy Lockard, Nile Bullock, Angel Pean, James Fouhey, and a full cast. Young highlighted Lockard's enthusiastic performance and noted that "the different voices will help young listeners follow along with the dialogue-driven story. The varying voices of the characters are backed by music and sound effects that give a comic-book feel to the story."

In 2023, AudioFile named the audiobook one of the year's best audiobooks in the category of Children & Family Listening. The following year, the Association for Library Service to Children included it on their list of Notable Children's Recordings.
