= Budmouth Academy =

Location
- Chickerell Road; Weymouth, Dorset, DT4 9SY; England
- Coordinates: 50.6111°N 2.4911°W

Information
- Type: Academy
- Trust: Aspirations Academies Trust
- Department for Education URN: 147443 Tables
- Ofsted: Reports
- Principal: Sara Mashike
- Gender: Coeducational
- Age: 11 to 18
- Enrolment: 1,515
- Website: www.budmouth-aspirations.org

Budmouth Academy (formerly Budmouth College) is a coeducational secondary school and sixth form in Weymouth, Dorset, overlooking the Jurassic Coast in England. It is named after the semi-fictional town of Budmouth (based on Weymouth) in Thomas Hardy's novels.

== Facilities ==
The school caters for over 1,500 students in the 11–18 range (school years 7–13), and is the only school in Weymouth to have a sixth form. The facilities include extensive playing fields covering 12 acres (49,000 m^{2}), netball and tennis courts, several design studios, and a photography workshop. Also forming part of the site is the privately owned Budmouth Community Sports Centre, which opened in 2003.

== 2018 Ofsted report and aftermath ==
In June 2018, Budmouth College - which had been rated "outstanding" in 2010 and 2013 - was deemed to be "inadequate" by Ofsted inspectors. Four months later Ofsted inspector Steve Smith was reported as saying the school had improved following the removal of its "dysfunctional governing body". In September 2019, the school became an academy, sponsored by the Aspiration Academy Trust, and was renamed Budmouth Academy. The school closed on 31 August 2019 pending its academisation.

== Book controversy ==
In 2025, the school removed the novel The Hate U Give by Angie Thomas from the reading list for its Year 10 pupils. This was because a parent had complained about sexual scenes in the book, its language and the portrayal of white people as "'the baddies'"; the parent said "'You are teaching my daughters that their inherited skin colour makes then baddies. That is racism'". The parent also complained about Pigeon English by Stephen Kelman; the school is unlikely to remove this novel as it is on the syllabus. Other parents and ex-pupils started a petition to put The Hate U Give back on the list. An ex-student said "'The bigger problem is that it feels like one parent's complaint has decided it for everyone, which isn’t fair. We should be trusted to handle these conversations'".
