= Faridah Àbíké-Íyímídé =

British writer

- Born: London, England
- Education: University of Aberdeen (MA)
- Occupations: Novelist; short-story writer; columnist
- Writing career
- Period: 2018–present
- Genres: Mystery; thriller; young adult fiction; science fiction
- Notable work: Ace of Spades
- Website: www.faridahabikeiyimide.com

Faridah Àbíké-Íyímídé is a British novelist, short-story writer and columnist. Her debut novel, the young adult thriller Ace of Spades (2021), received the NAACP Image Award for Outstanding Literary Work – Youth/Teens in 2022, and reached the top ten on The New York Times Best Seller list.

Additionally, Àbíké-Íyímídé has contributed writings to several publications, including The Bookseller, gal-dem, NME and Reader's Digest.

== Early life and education ==
Àbíké-Íyímídé was born and raised in Croydon in South London. She lived in Aberdeen, Scotland while studying English, Chinese and anthropology at the University of Aberdeen. She currently lives in London.

== Career ==
Àbíké-Íyímídé's debut novel, Ace of Spades, is a young adult thriller with themes of "homophobia in the black community, institutional racism and the diversity of thought among black people". In 2018 she gained an agent and a UK book deal for Ace of Spades with Usborne Publishing. In 2019, she founded Avengers of Colour, a mentorship initiative for un-agented writers of colour aimed at supporting participants in pursuing publication opportunities. In 2020 she gained a US book deal with Macmillan Publishers for Ace of Spades along with a second novel, for a seven-figure sum.

== Personal life ==
Àbíké-Íyímídé is a British-Nigerian and identifies herself as Muslim, she is openly queer.

== Publications ==
- Ace of Spades. New York: Feiwel & Friends, 2021. ISBN 978-1250800817. London: Usborne, 2021. ISBN 978-1474967532.
- The Doomsday Date. London: Usborne, 2024. ISBN 9781805076483
- Where Sleeping Girls Lie. New York: Feiwel & Friends, 2024. ISBN 9781250800855.
- & Jaigirdar A. Four Eids and a Funeral. New York: Feiwel & Friends, 2024 ISBN 9781250890146.
- The Heirs. London: Usborne, 2026. ISBN 9781835401002.

== Anthologies ==
- These Dreaming Spires: A Dark Academia Anthology (September 2, 2025)
- Spider-Man: Stories from the Spider-Verse (October 1, 2024)
- Doctor Who: Fifteen Doctors 15 Stories (19 September 2024)
- The White Guy Dies First (July 16, 2024)
- Joyful Joyful (2022)
- Doctor Who: Origin Stories (2022)
- Black Joy (2021)

== Award and Recognition ==
- Finalist, William C. Morris Award (2022) for Ace of Spades.
