= The Boy in the Black Suit =

2015 young adult novel by Jason Reynolds

- First edition cover
- Author: Jason Reynolds
- Publisher: Atheneum
- Publication date: January 6, 2015
- Pages: 272
- Awards: Coretta Scott King Honor (2016)
- ISBN: 978-1-4424-5950-2

The Boy in the Black Suit is a 2015 young adult novel by Jason Reynolds.

It is a 2016 Coretta Scott King Award honor book.

== Plot ==
Matt, a seventeen-year-old boy coping with the death of his mother, takes a job at a funeral home to support himself and his alcoholic father. Through his relationship with Lovey, a girl who's also experienced hardship, Matt finds companionship in his grief.

== Reception ==
The Boy in the Black Suit received mixed reviews from critics, who often found the plot to be lacking, despite strongly-written characters.

Publishers Weekly referred to The Boy in the Black Suit as "an affecting story," while Kirkus Reviews called it "a vivid, satisfying and ultimately upbeat tale of grief, redemption and grace." They highlighted how "Reynolds writes with a gritty realism that beautifully captures the challenges—and rewards—of growing up in the inner city." According to School Library Journal, the "sensitive novel [...] reads like a light vignette", despite dealing with "weighty subjects."

Reviewers often praised Reynold's character development, with School Library Journal writing, "He excels at writing an authentically teenage voice [...] and his characters are believable without being predictable." They added, "Reynolds has a great ear for dialogue overall and his transitions into memories and back to the present of the narrative are seamless." Booklist's Michael Cart called the protagonist "a wonderfully sympathetic, multidimensional character whose voice is a perfect match for the material and whose relationships [...] are beautifully realized."

However, reviewers often criticized the plot development, with Publishers Weekly noting that the novel's "faults offset its strengths". They pointed to "coincidences and plot twists" that "detract from the impact of the story as it develops", as well as the fact that the "romantic interest [...] doesn’t come on the scene until halfway through the book, and the wait feels long." Cart agreed the novel "gets off to a slightly slow start". However, he found that it "quickly becomes a superb, character-driven story." School Library Journal added, "By the end of the novel, some of those plot threads are left dangling. Endings wrapped up like presents are not the right thing for every book, but some of these subplots [...] are tied to characters whose lives were so integral to the main story. When a character is that important and developed, it seems odd when his story just fades away."

Booklist also reviewed the audiobook narrated by Corey Allen.

In 2016, The Boy in the Black Suit was named a Coretta Scott King honor book, and the Young Adult Library Services Association included it on their list of the Best Fiction for Young Adults.
