= For Every One =

2018 poetry book by Jason Reynolds

- First edition book cover
- Author: Jason Reynolds
- Publisher: Atheneum Books
- Publication date: April 10, 2018
- ISBN: 978-1-4814-8624-8

For Every One is a 2018 book of poetry for young adults by Jason Reynolds.

== Reception ==
For Every One was well received by critics.

In a starred review from School Library Journal, Jill Heritage Maza discussed how "the book's unconventionality, tone, spirit, and design will remind Reynolds' most dedicated fans of his first book, My Name Is Jason. Mine, Too: Our Story. Our Way," co-written with Jason Griffin. Maza highlighted how the book's premise "that even a successful author can doubt themselves will be revelatory to teens." Kirkus Reviews described the book as providing "hope and reassurance to teens as they try to make sense of their own dreams for the future." They highlighted how the "short piece is full of the elements that make Reynolds such a successful writer: honesty, rich imagery, great facility with language, and an irresistible cadence. At times conversational, other times, uplifting, this intimate and powerful piece connects on many levels." Kay Weisman, writing for Booklist, called the book "an inspirational piece from a master writer."

Weisman highlighted how "the layout makes use of various typefaces and font sizes, which helps to emphasize certain words and phrases."

In 2018, For Every One was nominated for the Goodreads Choice Award for Poetry.
