= Ace of Spades (novel) =

2021 young adult thriller novel by Faridah Àbíké-Íyímídé

- Cover of Ace of Spades
- Author: Faridah Àbíké-Íyímídé
- Language: English
- Genre: Young adult fiction, Mystery, Thriller
- Publisher: Feiwel & Friends
- Publication date: 1 June 2021
- Media type: Print
- ISBN: 9781250800817

Ace of Spades is a 2021 young adult thriller novel by British-Nigerian writer Faridah Àbíké-Íyímídé, published 1 June 2021 by Feiwel & Friends.

== Plot ==
Devon Richards and Chiamaka Adebayo are the only two Black students at their elite private school, Niveus Private Academy. Chiamaka is the school's queen bee and Devon is nearly invisible. They barely know each other and have never spoken to each other. Chiamaka is from a rich background, while Devon is from a working-class family.

Chiamaka's best friend is Jamie, who she has a crush on and used to have sex with a year ago. Chiamaka believes Jamie is going to ask her to be his girlfriend, but he asks out a girl called Belle, known for her good looks. Devon and his only friend, Jack, who is from a similar working-class background to Devon, have drifted apart.

Someone with the username "Aces" sends the entire student body a photo of Devon kissing another boy, outing him. Devon could be attacked if word of his homosexuality gets through to the gang in his neighbourhood. Later, Chiamaka is framed for theft, and Aces texts about it soon after.

Devon meets a boy named Terrell after getting beat up by some gang members. Terrell tells Devon they knew each other as children. They begin a relationship. Soon, there are more Aces texts about both Devon and Chiamaka, including a sex tape of Devon and another boy, damaging Devon's reputation in his neighbourhood. Chiamaka reports Aces to Headmaster Ward, but Aces frames them for the texts, forcing them to work together to discover Aces' identity.

Meanwhile, Chiamaka is jealous of Belle. Jamie is very happy with her and begins ignoring Chiamaka. An Aces text leads to Chiamaka and Jamie's relationship being discovered. Chiamaka is shunned, having almost no friends except a distant Jamie (whose true colours appear to be showing). However, the pair reconcile. Chiamaka also starts warming up to Belle, who is disgusted by Aces. Jack and Devon's friendship, which had been growing more distant, has dissolved completely after an Aces text claiming Jack has a drug addiction, as well as Jack avoiding Devon in fear that his brothers will become a gang target by association.

Belle and Jamie break up. Belle, having forgiven Chiamaka for having sex with Jamie as it was before he and Belle got together, becomes best friends with Chiamaka. Chiamaka soon realises that her feelings for Belle are romantic, and the pair start dating. Devon, feeling lonely, begins spending more time with Terrell, becoming more and more open with their feelings for each other, and trying to forget about his ex-lover. Soon, rumours spread about Belle and Chiamaka, and Jamie confronts Chiamaka about her relationship with Belle, accusing her of only dating Belle to snipe him.

Eventually, Chiamaka and Devon learn that Aces is the entire student body and faculty of Niveus, attacking Black students since the 1960s. It is a tradition that every decade, two Black students are admitted into Niveus and given every opportunity, only for Aces to ruin their reputations in their senior year so they drop out. Niveus Private Academy is one of many private institutions across the country that, due to age-old ties to slavery and the Confederacy, rarely accept Black students, but when they do, their goal is to perform social eugenics by allowing the students to climb in the school, then, in their senior year, destroy their futures, disallowing Black individuals to succeed in the world beyond high school.

Devon and Chiamaka plan to do a live broadcast of Headmaster Ward confessing to the tradition and have protestors arrive. Headmaster Ward reveals that the Black students before them who didn't drop out were murdered, just like they will be. However, Niveus Private Academy suddenly starts burning. Devon, Chiamaka, Terrell, and most of the student body escape. The school is destroyed. Three students are burned to death, including Jamie.

Ten years on, Devon is engaged to Terrell and works as a college professor. Chiamaka graduated Yale and became a successful doctor. Devon and Chiamaka are also co-founders of a secret society working on stopping institutions like Niveus. At the end of the novel, Chiamaka goes to see a seriously ill patient: Headmaster Ward.

== Reception ==
Ace of Spades received a starred review from School Library Journal and Publishers Weekly, as well as a positive review from Booklist.

In their review, Publishers Weekly noted, "Àbíké-Íyímídé excels in portraying the conflict of characters who exist in two worlds, one of white privilege and one in which Blackness is not a disadvantage but a point of pride. The story feels slightly overlong, but Devon and Chiamaka are dynamic and multifaceted, deeply human in the face of Aces' treatment."

School Library Journal and The Boston Globe named it one of the best young adult books of 2021. The Young Folks called it one of the best debuts of 2021. BuzzFeed said it had one of the best covers of young adult books for 2021.

Awards for Ace of Spades
Year	Awards	Result	Ref.
2021	Goodreads Choice Award for Young Adult Fiction	Finalist	
2022	Amazing Audiobooks for Young Adults	Top 100	
2022	Best Fiction for Young Adults	Top 100	
2022	YALSA's William C. Morris Award	Finalist	

== Book Banning Controversy ==
The book was permanently banned from libraries and classrooms in Flagler Schools and Bay District Schools, Florida. It is temporarily banned (pending investigation) in Clay County School District and Escambia County Public Schools, Florida.
