= Danica Novgorodoff =

American artist (born 1980)

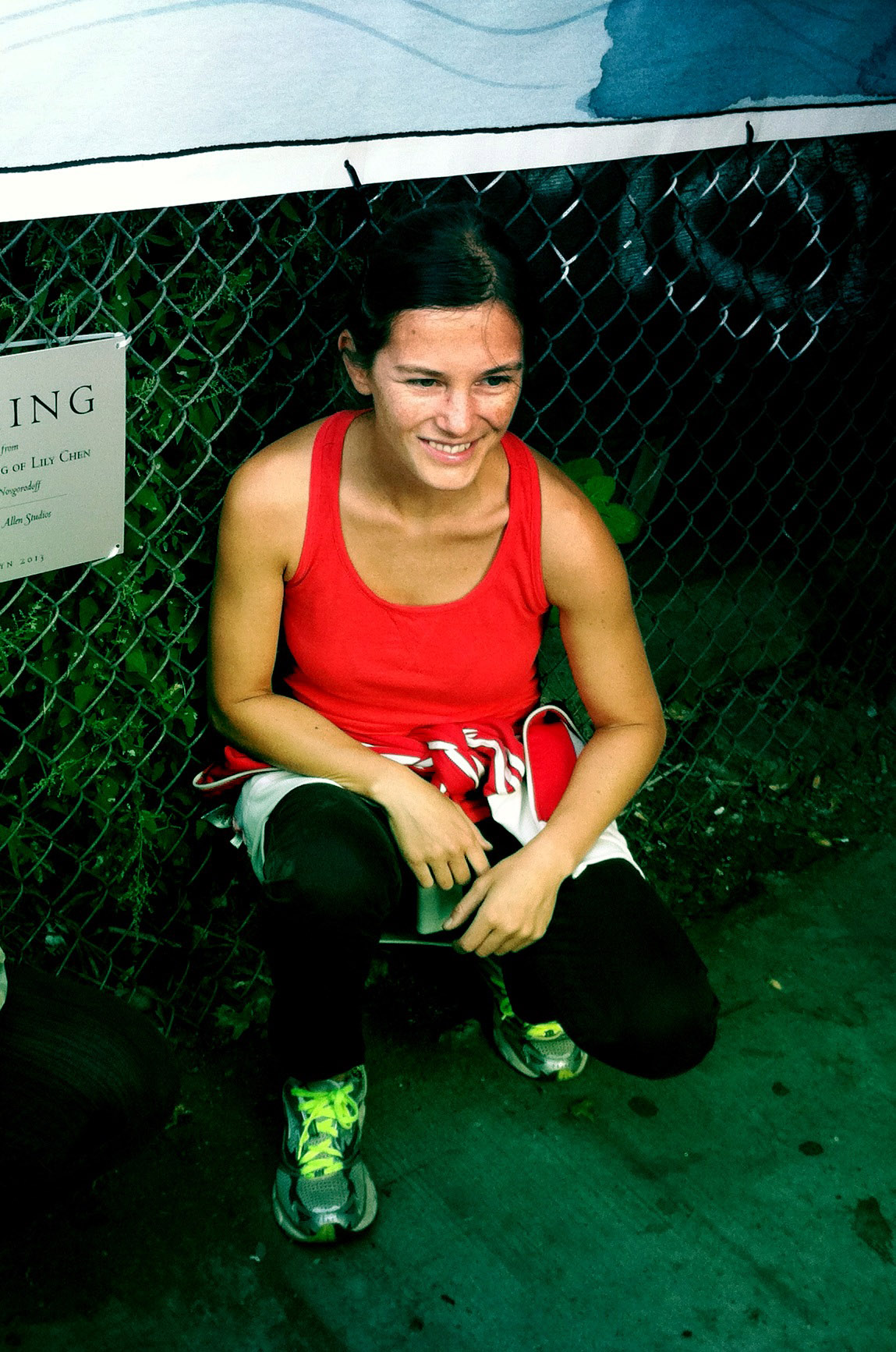
- Novgorodoff in 2013
- Born: September 8, 1980 (age 46) Chicago
- Areas: Cartoonist, Writer, Penciller, Inker, Editor, Letterer, Colourist
- Notable works: A Long Way Down, A Late Freeze, Slow Storm, Refresh, Refresh, The Undertaking of Lily Chen
- Awards: Kate Greenaway Medal

Danica Novgorodoff is a graphic novelist, painter, illustrator, graphic designer, and writer from Brooklyn, New York and Louisville, Kentucky. She was awarded a 2015 New York Foundation for the Arts fellowship in Literature, was named Sarabande Books’ 2016 writer in residence, and received a 2020 Café Royal Cultural Foundation grant in literature. Her art and writing have been published in MoMA Magazine, Best American Comics, The Believer, Artforum, Esquire, VQR, Slate, Orion, Seneca Review, Ecotone Journal, The Arkansas International, and others.

== Career ==
Novgorodoff's first graphic novel, A Late Freeze, was self-published in 2006 and won the Isotope Award for excellence in mini-comics, and her graphic novel, Refresh, Refresh, was included in Best American Comics in 2011. Her book, The Undertaking of Lily Chen, was published in March 2014. In 2020, Novgorodoff's graphic novel adaptation of Long Way Down, by Jason Reynolds, was published by Simon and Schuster and won the 2022 Kate Greenaway Medal.

Novgorodoff is a graduate of Yale University with a bachelor's degree in art and, from 1999 to 2003, worked as an assistant to photographer Sally Mann.

== Bibliography ==
- A Late Freeze, 2006
- Slow Storm, 2008
- Refresh, Refresh, with James Ponsoldt and Benjamin Percy, 2009
- The Undertaking of Lily Chen, 2014
- Long Way Down, adapted from the novel by Jason Reynolds, 2020
- The Simple Art of Rice , with JJ Johnson, 2023
