= The Hate U Give =

2017 young adult novel by Angie Thomas

- Hardcover dustjacket (2017, 1st ed.)
- Author: Angie Thomas
- Cover artist: Debra Cartwright
- Publisher: Balzer + Bray
- Publication date: February 28, 2017
- Publication place: United States
- Pages: 444
- ISBN: 978-0-06-249853-3
- Preceded by: Concrete Rose

The Hate U Give is a 2017 young adult novel by Angie Thomas. It is Thomas's debut novel, expanded from a short story she wrote in college in reaction to the police shooting of Oscar Grant. The book is narrated by Starr Carter, a 16-year-old African-American girl from a poor neighborhood who attends an elite private school in a predominantly white, affluent part of the city. Starr becomes entangled in a national news story after she witnesses a white police officer shoot and kill her childhood friend, Khalil. She speaks up about the shooting in increasingly public ways, and social tensions culminate in a riot after a grand jury decides not to indict the police officer for the shooting.

The Hate U Give was published on February 28, 2017, by HarperCollins imprint Balzer + Bray, which had won a bidding war for the rights to the novel. The book was a commercial success, debuting at number one on The New York Times young adult best-seller list, where it remained for 50 weeks. It won several awards and received critical praise for Thomas's writing and timely subject matter. In writing the novel, Thomas attempted to expand readers' understanding of the Black Lives Matter movement as well as difficulties faced by black Americans who employ code switching. These themes, as well as the vulgar language, attracted some controversy and caused the book to be one of the most challenged books of 2017, 2018, 2020 and 2021 according to the American Library Association.

The book was adapted into a film by 20th Century Fox in October 2018, which received positive reviews. The novel was also adapted into an audiobook, which won several awards and earned praise for its narrator, Bahni Turpin.

== Development and publication ==
Shaken by the 2009 police shooting of Oscar Grant, then-college student Angie Thomas began the project as a short story for her senior project in Belhaven University's creative writing program. While writing the short story, the project quickly expanded, though Thomas put it aside for a few years after graduation. Speaking to her hometown newspaper, Thomas said, "I wanted to make sure I approached it not just in anger, but with love even." The deaths of Trayvon Martin, Michael Brown, Tamir Rice, and Sandra Bland drew Thomas back to expand the project into a novel, which she titled after Tupac's "THUG LIFE" concept: "The Hate U Give Little Infants Fucks Everybody." Events surrounding the killings of Alton Sterling, Philando Castile and Michael Brown, and widespread ensuing protests against racism and police brutality, also informed moments in the book.

Unsure whether publishers would be interested in the Black Lives Matter-inspired material, Thomas reached out to literary agent Brooks Sherman on Twitter in June 2015 to ask for advice. In February 2016, HarperCollins' imprint Balzer + Bray bought the rights to the novel in an auction, outbidding 13 other publishing houses, and signed a two-book deal with Thomas. 20th Century Fox optioned the film rights the following month.

The 444-page book was published on February 28, 2017, when the industry was attempting to address a decade-long stagnation in the number of children's books by African-American authors. Since its publication, Thomas has become an example of attempts by publishers to publish more young adult African-American novelists.

== Plot ==
Starr Carter is a 16-year-old black girl, who lives in the fictional and mostly poor black neighborhood of Garden Heights, but attends an affluent and predominantly white private school, Williamson Prep. After a shooting breaks up a party Starr is attending, she is driven home by her childhood best friend and sometimes crush Khalil. They are stopped by a white police officer, who she calls "Officer One-Fifteen" due to his badge. One-Fifteen instructs Khalil, who is black, to exit the car; while outside the car, Khalil leans into the driver-side window to check in on Starr. One-Fifteen assumes he is grabbing a gun and shoots Khalil three times, killing him.

Starr agrees to an interview with police about the shooting after being encouraged by her Uncle Carlos, who is also a detective. Carlos was a father figure to Starr when her father, Maverick, spent three years in prison for gang activity. Following his release, Maverick left the gang and became the owner of the Garden Heights grocery store where Starr and her older half-brother "Seven" work. Maverick was only allowed to leave his gang, the King Lords, because he confessed to a crime to protect gang-leader King. Widely feared in the neighborhood, King now lives with Seven's mother, Seven's half-sister Kenya, who is friends with Starr, and Kenya's little sister, Lyric.

Khalil's death becomes a national news story. The media portrays Khalil as a gang banger and drug dealer, while portraying One-Fifteen more favorably. Starr's identity as the witness is initially kept secret from everyone outside Starr's family, including her younger brother Sekani. Keeping the secret from her white boyfriend Chris and her best friends Hailey Grant and Maya Yang – who all attend Williamson Prep – weighs on Starr, as does her need to keep her Williamson and Garden Heights personalities separate. Starr's struggles with her identity are further complicated after her mother gets a higher-paying job and the family moves out of Garden Heights.

After a grand jury fails to indict One-Fifteen, Garden Heights erupts into both peaceful protests and riots. The failure of the criminal justice system to hold One-Fifteen accountable pushes Starr to take an increasingly public role, first giving a television interview and then speaking out during the protests, which are met by police in riot gear. Her increasing identification with the people of Garden Heights causes tension with Starr's friends, especially with her boyfriend Chris as well as Hailey, who makes racist comments at Starr. But by the end of the novel, Starr and Maya have started standing up to Hailey's comments while Chris offers support to Starr.

The climax of the novel occurs during the riot following the grand jury decision. Starr, Chris, Seven, and DeVante – a teenager whom Maverick helped leave the King Lords – defend Maverick's store from King, though it does get burned down. The neighborhood stands up to King and as a result of testimony by DeVante, King is arrested and expected to be imprisoned for a lengthy sentence. Starr promises to keep Khalil's memory alive and to continue her advocacy against injustice as Garden Heights rebuilds.

== Style ==
Vincent Haddad of Central State University reads The Hate U Give as an attempt to build empathy with the Black Lives Matter movement, as "the appeals for empathy figured by Starr's first-person account ultimately serve to discipline those who seek solutions deemed too 'un-realistic' to oppose the 'sustained violence against Black communities'". By maintaining realism, and explicitly naming real-world victims of police brutality, Haddad contends that Thomas is able to spur action in her readers. However, he ultimately feels that there are limits to this approach because it is about the individual rather than the collective. By contrast, Vox's Constance Grady argues that this realism is what makes the novel ultimately work to larger purposes: "The specificity and whimsy of ideas like the anger scale of breakup songs is what keeps The Hate U Give moving so deftly through its heavy subject matter; it stays warm and focused and grounded in character even when it's dealing with big, amorphous ideas like systemic racism."

== Themes ==
Race relations are a core theme of the novel. Professor Khalil Muhammad of Harvard University's Kennedy School of Government sees the novel as a way to have discussions among people who might not otherwise discuss Black Lives Matter: "The book – and to some degree the movie – has been read and will be read by students in all-white spaces, where otherwise the urgency of these issues has not affected them personally." At the same time, it could offer solace for black teens who have faced similar challenges to Starr. An example of this is Starr's ability to code switch between her private school and home, which Thomas demonstrates through the slang that Starr uses in each context's dialogue. Also helping Starr is her family who offer a variety of points of view, including her Uncle's thoughts as a police officer and her father teaching Starr and her siblings about the Black Panther Party. The novel also shows Starr's parents' struggles with remaining connected to their community while needing to protect and give opportunity to their children.

The Hate U Give shows Starr's dual need to respond both to the trauma of witnessing Khalil's death and her need to do so politically. This dual need, combined with Thomas's ability to root these struggles in their historical context, helps give the book its power, according to Jonathan Alexander writing in the Los Angeles Review of Books. Los Angeles Times' critic Adriana Ramirez sees Starr as similar to the protagonists of fantasy dystopian novels like Divergent and The Hunger Games as she seeks to change an entrenched system of power, noting, "it is also a dystopian young adult novel that happens to be set in reality." Nick Smart, a professor at the College of New Rochelle, takes this further, stating, "In The Hate U Give, there's also a girl – who happens to be a black girl – being sent out against the system, against the world, against an entrenched opposition," while Ramirez notes that Starr's blackness is a core element for some readers. Before its publication, exploring a female perspective on the isolation and need to be a model minority at an elite private school was something which had not been conducted in literature or film with the same frequency as for males. Thomas's ability to capture these feelings stemmed from her own experiences with the reactions of her white classmates following the death of Oscar Grant.

Discussing the title, The Atlantic wrote, "Thomas's book derives its title from the rapper Tupac Shakur's philosophy of THUG LIFE—which purportedly stands for 'The Hate U Give Little Infants Fucks Everybody'—and it's a motif the novel returns to a few times. The acronym tattooed across Tupac's abdomen could be read as an embrace of a dangerous lifestyle. But, as Khalil explains to Starr, just minutes before the cop pulls them over, it's really an indictment of systemic inequality and hostility: 'What society gives us as youth, it bites them in the ass when we wild out.'"

The novel does not shy away from the realities of urban life, exemplified by the title's reference to the Tupac Shakur quote. Starr's feelings about Khalil evolve during the novel. The reader is first introduced to him at the party as a friend of Starr's and as a victim of a police shooting. This narrative is then complicated both for Starr and in the novel's world at large when it is learned that Khalil dealt drugs. However, Starr comes to disagree with the way the media is portraying Khalil. As Starr finds her own agency, she is able to challenge this narrative first for herself and then for others, recognizing that Khalil was forced into these circumstances by poverty, hunger, and a desire to care for his drug addict mother. She is able to show her courage speaking to the grand jury, and realizes that she needs to participate in the protests which follow its decision. How and where Khalil and Starr can find justice also drives Starr's decision to join in the protests.

== Reception ==
=== Critical reviews ===
In the Christian Science Monitor, Katie Ward Beim-Esche wrote, "Believe the hype: The Hate U Give, Angie Thomas's extraordinary and fearless debut, really is that good." Shannon Ozirny of The Globe and Mail also felt it would have wide appeal, "Ignore the YA label – this should be the one book everyone reads this year." On Salon, Erin Keane wrote that the novel is "topical, urgent, necessary, and if that weren't enough, it's also a highly entertaining and engaging read."

The book also earned starred reviews from multiple review journals. Kirkus praised both its writing and timelines: "With smooth but powerful prose ... This story is necessary. This story is important." Young adult literature expert Michael Cart, writing in Booklist, also praised Thomas's writing as Starr: "Beautifully written in Starr's authentic first-person voice, this is a marvel of verisimilitude." While praising the overall book in a starred review, School Library Journal's Mahnaz Dar criticized the writing of several characters as "slightly uneven." The Bulletin of the Center for Children's Books, Horn Book Magazine, and VOYA also gave the book their equivalents of starred reviews.

=== Awards and honors ===
The Hate U Give debuted at the top of The New York Times young adult (YA) best-seller list, and was on it for more than 80 weeks. It is also an IndieBound best seller. The book had 100,000 copies in print in the first month, eventually selling more than 850,000 copies as of June 2018.

The Horn Book Magazine, Kirkus Reviews, Publishers Weekly, and Shelf Awareness, among others, named it one of the best young adult novels of 2017. Booklist named it one of the best books of the year regardless of genre. Booklist included the audiobook on their 2017 "Top 10 First Novels on Audio" and 2018 "Top 10 Diverse Novels on Audio" lists.

Both the book and audiobook editions are Junior Library Guild selections.

Awards for The Hate U Give
Year	Award	Result	Ref.
2017	Booklist Editors' Choice: Audio for Youth	Selection	
2017	Booklist Editors' Choice: Books for Youth	Selection	
2017	Boston Globe–Horn Book Award	Winner	
2017	Cybils Award for Young Adult Fiction	Finalist	
2017	Goodreads Choice Awards for Young Adult Fiction	Winner	
2017	Goodreads Choice Award for Debut Goodreads Author	Winner	
2017	Kirkus Prize	Finalist	
2017	National Book Award for Young Adult Literature	Longlist	
2018	Amazing Audiobooks for Young Adults	Top 10	
2018	Amelia Elizabeth Walden Award	Winner	
2018	Audie Award for Best Female Narrator	Winner	
2018	Audie Award for Young Adult	Winner	
2018	British Book Awards Children's Book of the Year	Shortlist	
2018	Carnegie Medal	Honour	
2018	Coretta Scott King Award	Honor	
2018	Deutscher Jugendliteraturpreis	Winner	
2018	Edgar Award Nominee for Best Young Adult	Winner	
2018	Goodreads Choice Award Best of the Best	Winner	
2018	Indies Choice Award for Young Adult Book of the Year	Winner	
2018	Los Angeles Times Book Prize for Young Adult Novel	Finalist	
2018	William C. Morris Award	Winner	
2018	ALSC Notable Children's Recordings	Selection	
2018	Odyssey Award for Excellence in Audiobook Production	Winner	
2018	Michael L. Printz Award	Honor	
2018	Quick Picks for Reluctant Young Adult Readers	Top 10	
2018	Waterstones Children's Book Prize	Winner	
2018	Waterstones Children's Book Prize for Older Fiction	Winner	

=== Challenges ===
The American Library Association listed the book as one of the ten most-challenged books of 2017, 2018, 2020, and 2021 "because it was considered 'pervasively vulgar,'" contained "drug use, profanity, and offensive language," as well as sexual references, and "was thought to promote an anti-police message."

In July 2018, a South Carolina police union raised objections to the inclusion of the book, as well as the similarly themed All American Boys by Brendan Kiely and Jason Reynolds, in the summer reading list for ninth-grade students of Wando High School. A representative of the police lodge described the inclusion of the books as "almost indoctrination of distrust of police" and asserted that "we've got to put a stop to that." The books remained on the list and Wando's principal was later recognized by the state school library association for her defense of the challenged books.

The book was removed from the school libraries of the Katy Independent School District due to its explicit language. Thomas responded to these challenges by defending the book's message and saying that it is a spur for conversation. In December 2021, it was also removed from some Washington County School District libraries for explicit content. In 2022, the Edgerton (MN) Public School District school board voted unanimously, 5–0, to remove the book from the freshman curriculum. The board cited profanity and omission of the police officer's viewpoint for its objection to the book. In 2024, the book was banned by Collier County Public Schools (FL), citing, "There's talk of an affair between two adults. Teens engage in heavy petting, talk about having sex and condoms. A teen girl is described as being on birth control, and there's discussion of teen pregnancy and the assumption that a married couple is having sex when they go to their bedroom and turn the television up loud. A woman is revealed to be a sex worker."

In 2025, Budmouth Academy in the United Kingdom removed The Hate U Give from the reading list for its Year 10 pupils. This was because a parent had complained about sexual scenes in the book, its language and the portrayal of white people as "'the baddies'"; the parent said "'You are teaching my daughters that their inherited skin colour makes then baddies. That is racism'". Other parents and ex-pupils of the school started a petition to put The Hate U Give back on the reading list. Also in 2025, the Elizabethtown Area school board of directors in Elizabethtown, Pennsylvania voted to remove the book (along with two other books, a poem, and movie) from its curriculum, despite it being an optional read. Many students spoke in support of keeping the title, but were met with dismissive tones by the board president.

== Adaptations ==
=== Film ===
Fox 2000 optioned The Hate U Give for a film adaption in March 2017, shortly after the book's auction. Director George Tillman Jr. and actress Amandla Stenberg were immediately attached to the project. The movie also features Issa Rae, Regina Hall, Russell Hornsby, Algee Smith, KJ Apa, Lamar Johnson, Anthony Mackie, Common, and Sabrina Carpenter. The film is based on a screenplay by Audrey Wells, who died one day before it was released. Stenberg's casting received some criticism because of her lighter complexion as compared to the girl on the novel's cover. The movie was given a limited release on October 5, 2018, and a wide release on October 19, 2018. The film was favorably received, with a Rotten Tomatoes critics score of 8.2 out of 10, and an A+ CinemaScore. As of March 2019, the film had a worldwide box office gross of $34 million against a budget of $23 million.

=== Audiobook ===
An audiobook was released by Harper Audio on the same day as the novel and featured narration by Bahni Turpin, whom Thomas had selected. Audiobook producer Caitlin Garing spoke of the importance of matching the material with the narrator and spoke of Turpin's skill, "you can trust her to get to the heart of a story and lead the listener there." It was well reviewed and won Audie Awards for best YA and best female narrator. In her acceptance speech, Turpin said it was "an important book for our time." It also won the 2018 Odyssey Award for best children's audiobook. Odyssey committee chair Joan Schroeder Kindig said, "Bahni Turpin's powerful narration of this timely novel will inspire listeners to find their own voices." Turpin downplayed the award saying, "I don't think the public is aware of most of our awards, though – in general, I think those who most appreciate the awards are ... the people in the business of books." Publishers Weekly, in its starred review of the audiobook, praised Turpin's abilities to convey "the complexity of the 16-year-old protagonist who sounds both youthful and mature for her age, as she relies on code-switching to navigate two different social settings." Maggie Knapp in her starred review for School Library Journal and Lynette Pitrak in her starred review for Booklist also praised Turpin's ability to capture Starr's voice in her performance.
