= As Brave as You =

2016 novel by Jason Reynolds

As Brave As You
- Author: Jason Reynolds
- Language: English
- Published: May 3, 2016
- Publisher: Atheneum Books
- Publication place: United States
- Media type: Print (paperback, hardcover)
- Pages: 310
- Award: NAACP Image Award for Outstanding Literary Work for Youth/Teen (2017), Schneider Family Book Award (2017), Coretta Scott King Award (2017)
- ISBN: 9781481415903

As Brave As You is a young adult novel written by Jason Reynolds, published May 9, 2016 by Atheneum. The book describes two African-American brothers from Brooklyn who are sent to spend the summer with their grandfather in Virginia.

The book won the Kirkus Prize (2016), as well as the NAACP Image Award for Outstanding Literary Work for Youth/Teen (2017), and the Schneider Family Book Award (2017).

== Reception ==
As Brave As You received starred reviews from Kirkus, Booklist, Shelf Awareness, and School Library Journal, a five-star review from Common Sense Media.

Kirkus Reviews praised the novel, stating that it is "a rich, nuanced, and highly relatable story" that "will resonate deeply with readers." Booklist's Ilene Cooper similarly referred to it as "a powerful exploration of family, identity, and community." Karin Snelson, writing for Shelf Awareness, called the novel "a beautifully written, poignant story" that "explores complex themes with sensitivity and humor." In The Washington Post, Mary Quattlebaum highlighted how "Reynolds deftly blends humor and heart through lively dialogue and spot-on sibling dynamics." Common Sense Media praised the novel's "authentic and relatable characters" and its "thought-provoking exploration of family dynamics and identity." Writing for School Library Journal, Luann Toth called As Brave As You "[a] richly realized story about life and loss, courage and grace, and what it takes to be a man. Although a tad lengthy, it is easy reading and will be appreciated by a broad audience."

Multiple reviewers discussed Reynold's writing, with Cooper calling it "lyrical and evocative." Publishers Weekly noted that Reynolds' "vivid storytelling and well-developed characters" make the book "a compelling read."

Elizabeth Bush, writing for The Bulletin of the Center for Children's Books, compared As Brave As You to Christopher Paul Curtis's The Watsons Go to Birmingham – 1963 "with the city kids’ humorous adjustment to rural life, underpinned with a serious subplot that steadily rises in importance."

The New York Public Library, Kirkus Reviews, Shelf Awareness, the Center for the Study of Multicultural Children's Literature, The Washington Post, and School Library Journal named As Brave As You one of the best books of the year.

Accolades for As Brave As You
Year	Accolade	Result	Ref.
2016	Booklist Editors' Choice: Books for Youth	Selection	
2016	Junior Library Guild booklist	Selection	
2016	Kirkus Prize for Young Readers' Literature	Winner	
2017	Association for Library Service to Children's Notable Children's Books	Selection	
2017	Association for Library Service to Children's Notable Children's Recordings	Selection	
2017	Coretta Scott King Award	Honor	
2017	E. B. White Read-Aloud Award	Honor	
2017	NAACP Image Award for Outstanding Literary Work for Youth/Teen	Winner	
2017	Schneider Family Book Award	Winner	
2019	William Allen White Children's Book Award	Nominee	
2020	Rebecca Caudill Young Readers' Book Award	Nominee	
