= We Need Diverse Books =

Nonprofit organization established in 2014

- Formation: July 29, 2014; 12 years ago
- Founded at: Pennsylvania
- Type: 501(c)(3)
- Website: diversebooks.org

We Need Diverse Books (WNDB) is a nonprofit organization created to promote diversity of multiple forms in American children's literature and publishing, which grew out of the Twitter hashtag #WeNeedDiverseBooks in 2014. The organization's programming includes funding grants and internships for diverse authors and people interested in publishing, a mentorship program, providing lists of book recommendations for librarians, teachers, and parents on finding books with characters from marginalized backgrounds, and publishing an anthology of short stories featuring multiple authors from diverse backgrounds.

== History ==
We Need Diverse Books started on Twitter. Following the announcement of a panel of all-white, all-male children's authors at BookCon in 2014, Ellen Oh, Malinda Lo, and other authors and publishing insiders began protesting and discussing the lack of diversity and representation in the field on Twitter using the hashtag #WeNeedDiverseBooks.

The organizers asked Twitter followers to hold up a sign that said "We need diverse books because..." and insert their own personal reasons. This campaign elicited responses including: author Gayle Forman stating, "So both my daughters can see themselves – and each other – in books"; Lee & Low Books writing, "...despite myths to the contrary, there's a market for them. We've been selling them for 20 years"; and Ellen Oh stating, "...because of the young girl who looked at me with stars in her eyes and said, 'Now I know I can be a writer too!'".

As the online discussion surrounding the hashtag grew, a core group of individuals decided to formally create a group to continue the movement. On July 29, 2014, We Need Diverse Books filed for incorporation as a nonprofit in Pennsylvania.

== Programs ==
=== Walter Dean Myers Awards ===
The Walter Dean Myers Award for Outstanding Children's Literature, known as "The Walters,” was created in 2014. Named after young adult author Walter Dean Myers, the award recognizes published, diverse authors who champion marginalized voices in their stories. The inaugural award was given to Jason Reynolds and Brendan Kiely in 2016 for their book All American Boys. The awards program is managed by co-directors Kathie Weinberg and Terry Hong. In 2018 WNDB changed the categories from a single category of young adult titles to two categories of teen and young readers. Subsequent awards include both categories.

=== Walter Dean Myers Grant ===
The Walter Dean Myers Grant is a grant that financially supports emerging published and unpublished, diverse writers and illustrators. The grant was established in 2014 and named after children’s book author Walter Dean Myers, an advocate of multicultural children’s books. In 2015, WNDB granted their first recipients (five writers and illustrators) $2,000 each. In 2016, WNDB granted five more writers and illustrators $2,000 each. The Walter Grant took a hiatus in 2017 and resumed in 2018.

=== WNDB Internship Grants ===
WNDB Internship Grants was established in 2014 but became active in 2015. The program was created to financially support college students who are pursuing their dreams of a career in children’s publishing with an internship at a publishing house. In the inaugural year (2015) five interns received $2,500 each to support their internship sessions. In 2016, WNDB gave out 11 grants of $2,500 each and also invited them to networking events during their intern session. In 2017, nine interns were given the grant and interned across many publishing divisions. Since the program started 13 interns now have full-time publishing jobs. In 2018, WNDB plans to award eight grants to interns.

=== WNDB Scholastic Partnership ===
In 2016, Scholastic and We Need Diverse Books announced their expanded collaboration for the 2016-2017 school year via a series of eight flyers distributed to classrooms via the Scholastic Reading Club.

=== YA Short Story Contest ===
In 2016 a program that allowed children of all ages, races, and genders to submit short stories to the company was started. To be eligible for a prize, the stories have to be 4,000 words or less, and applicants have to explain in less than 75 words how the story is diverse. The applicant must also be under 18 years of age to be considered a child and must not have published this writing prior to this contest. The contestant that wins this contest receives a $1,000 grand prize.

=== Mentorships ===
WNDB offers 11 writing mentorships for inspiring writers in picture book text, fiction and nonfiction, middle grade fiction, and young adult fiction, middle grade nonfiction, young adult nonfiction, and illustration. The program requires that the chosen mentees communicate with their mentors for a year. To be eligible for the writing mentorship a mentee has to either be a diverse writer/illustrator or a writer/illustrator that have a completed draft of a manuscript for children or teens that have a diverse main character or a diverse central subject. An illustrator has to have a portfolio and numerous completed samples of illustrations.

=== OurStory ===
Ourstory is WNDB app is a database resource for kids, teens, parents and educators to help find diverse stories. The app offers different levels of subscription to gain exclusive content and materials from authors and illustrators that educators and librarians can include in programs and curriculum. OurStory kids is for 12 and younger, OurStory Teens is for 13 and up, and OurStory Pro is for educators.

Two unique aspects of the app are the "window" or "mirror" feature and that the app does not have a search box. The "mirror" or "window" feature stems from an idea of Dr. Rudine Sims Bishop, a librarian. She believed that it is important for children to see or "mirror" themselves and culture in the books that they read. The OurStory app does not have a search box because the app is made for people to discover new books.

=== Bookseller of the Year Award ===
The Bookseller of the Year Award was created to celebrate the role that independent booksellers play in aiding the discovery of diverse authors and illustrators. The program launched in 2017 with over 25 nominations and the winner was Sara Luce Look from Charis Books and More in Atlanta, Georgia. To be eligible for the award the nominees need to meet the following requirements:

- Participation in the aba winter institute, ABC children's institute and co-development of outreach to diverse teens at the Texas teen book festival.
- Creation of "book talking kits" to provide booksellers with a framework to successfully hand sell diverse books.
- Establishment of the WNDB bookseller of the year award to honor a bookseller who has shown exemplary community engagement and support for diverse books.
- Partnership with edelweiss so book buyers can easily identify books in the Ourstory app by a WNDB icon.

=== WNDB in the Classroom ===
One of WNDB goals is to bring diverse books and authors to low-income schools. They provide free books and author visits to the low income classrooms around the country. WNDB realized that there was a literary gap that affected youths and decided to create WNDB in the Classroom, to help children find stories and characters that they can relate to. Since 2014 the program has donated over $75,000 worth of books, along with comprehensive discussion guides. As of December 2018 the program has donated over 12,000 books to school children across 32 states.

=== WNDB Retreat ===
WNDB offers two different retreats for diverse writers and/or writers who have a diverse story to tell.

The Writing Cross Culturally Retreat – Provides writers with resources and tools for telling stories with care, respect, and sensitivity. On this retreat there are discussions on representation and misrepresentation, the ways prejudices and privileges connect to the writing and publishing process. Participants are encouraged to learn how to analyze their own internal prejudices and those that are endemic to publishing by looking beyond themselves and inherent biases. The goal of this retreat is to help participants understand the how, when, why and why not of writing cross-culturally through hands on workshops, lectures, group and individual work, writing exercise, and space for personal reflection.

The Own Voices Retreat – Provides writers from marginalized backgrounds with resources to develop their manuscripts, learn about the industry, and gain the tools to navigate the publishing industry. The goal of this retreat is to help participants work on their manuscripts, learn information about the publishing process, and guide them through the publishing process by having hands on workshop, lectures, group and individual work, writing exercises, breakouts, personal reflection, as well as opportunities to dig into their manuscripts and work with mentors to get their work submission ready.

=== Anthologies ===
WNDB publishes short stories anthologies that are school-friendly and showcase diverse authors. The anthologies feature award-winning authors’ and new voices original stories. This is yet another way to support the WNDB goal to provide diverse materials in children’s literature. The YA anthologies, Flying Lessons & Other Stories and Fresh Ink, are available for purchase. There is a middle grade anthology coming soon. WNDB hosts a short-story contest every year for an unpublished, diverse author and the winner holds a spot in the book. The winner also receives $1,000.

=== PRH/WNDB Creative Writing Awards ===
The Penguin Random House/WNDB Creative Writing Award was established in 2019. WNDB has partnered with the Penguin Random House Foundation and Scholarship America to manage the Penguin Random House Creative Writing Scholarship Competition. The competition recognizes the unique voices of high school seniors across the country by providing scholarship awards in the amount of $10,000 for the following categories:

- Maya Angelou Award for Spoken Word Poetry
- Poetry
- Fiction/Drama
- Personal Essay/Memoir
- One additional award of $10,000 will be awarded to a student from the NYC-area.

The below paragraph details the criteria for judging submitted works, as stated on their website: "Literary compositions will judged by their technical merit; however, artistic expression is our core criterion. We are looking for writing with a strong, clear voice by authors who are daring, original, and unafraid to take risks. All judging will be under the supervision of We Need Diverse Books and Penguin Random House by a specially selected panel of judges."

== Publications ==
In January 2017, We Need Diverse Books published a middle-grade anthology of short stories called Flying Lessons and Other Stories featuring a wide breadth of diverse authors and stories.

Fresh Ink, an young adult anthology of diverse short stories, was published by Penguin Random House on August 14, 2017. The book features various authors of a diverse background.
