= Quick Picks for Reluctant Young Adult Readers =

Annual American book list

Quick Picks for Reluctant Young Adult Readers is a book list created annually by the Young Adult Library Services Association. The list identifies fiction, nonfiction, and graphic novels that may encourage teenagers who dislike reading to read.

Researchers, educators, librarians, parents, and teenagers have used the list to identify books reluctant young adult readers may enjoy.

== Criteria ==
When selecting books for the Quick Picks list, the judges consider:

- Physical appearance (e.g., the cover, print style, format, and artwork/illustrations)
- Writing style

For fiction novels, judges consider whether the book has:

- High interest "hook" in first 10 pages
- Well-defined characters
- Sufficient plot to sustain interest
- Plot lines developed through dialogue and action
- Familiar themes with emotional appeal for teenagers
- Believable treatment
- Single point of view
- Touches of humor when appropriate
- Chronological order

For informational books, judges consider the accuracy and objectivity of the book, as well as whether technical language is well-defined.

== Recipients ==
Quick Picks for Reluctant Young Adult Readers Top Ten (2016-2021)
Award Year	Author	Title
2016	Victoria Aveyard	Red Queen
2016	Holly Black and Cassandra Clare	The Iron Trial
2016	Fonda Lee	Zeroboxer
2016	Sam Maggs	The Fangirl's Guide to the Galaxy: A Handbook for Girl Geeks
2016	Julie Murphy	Dumplin'
2016	E. C. Myers	The Silence of Six
2016	Daniel José Older	Shadowshaper
2016	Kate Schatz	Rad American Women A-Z: Rebels, Trailblazers, and Visionaries Who Shaped Our History
2016	ND Stevenson	Nimona
2016	Nicola Yoon	Everything, Everything
2017	Julie Buxbaum	Tell Me Three Things
2017	Jeff Garvin	Symptoms of Being Human
2017	Nadia Abushanab Higgins	Feminism: Reinventing the F-Word
2017	E. K. Johnston	Exit, Pursued by a Bear
2017	Jeff Lemire	Plutona
2017	Amy Lukavics	Daughters Unto Devils
2017	Marieke Nijkamp	This Is Where It Ends
2017	Jason Reynolds and Brendan Kiely	All American Boys
2017	Meredith Russo	If I Was Your Girl
2017	Sarvenaz Tash	The Geek's Guide to Unrequited Love
2018	Alison Deering with Bob Lentz (Illus.)	Sandwiches!: More Than You've Ever Wanted to Know About Making and Eating America's Favorite Food
2018	Keith Giffen with Howard Porter (Illus.)	Scooby Apocalypse
2018	Karen M. McManus	One of Us Is Lying
2018	Doreen Rappaport	42 Is Not Just a Number: The Odyssey of Jackie Robinson, American Hero
2018	Jason Reynolds	Long Way Down
2018	Jason Reynolds	Miles Morales: Spider-Man
2018	Jason Reynolds	Patina
2018	Nic Stone	Dear Martin
2018	Angie Thomas	The Hate U Give
2018	Scott Westerfeld with Alex Puvilland (Illus.)	Spill Zone
2019	Elizabeth Acevedo	The Poet X
2019	Laurie Halse Anderson with Emily Carroll (Illus.)	Speak: The Graphic Novel
2019	Tommy Greenwald	Game Changer
2019	Jarrett Krosoczka	Hey Kiddo: How I Lost My Mother, Found My Father, and Dealt with Family Addiction
2019	Gretchen McNeil	#MurderTrending
2019	Jason Reynolds	Track series (Sunny [vol. 3] and Lu [vol. 4])
2019	Aisha Saeed	Amal Unbound
2019	Chana Stiefel	Animal Zombies!: And Other Blood-Sucking Beasts, Creepy Creatures, and Real-Life Monsters
2019	Courtney Summers	Sadie
2019	Jen Wang	The Prince and the Dressmaker
2020	Ashley Elston	10 Blind Dates
2020	Eva Darrows	Belly Up
2020	Mindy McGinnis	Heroine
2020	Colleen AF Venable with Ellen T. Crenshaw (Illus.)	Kiss Number 8
2020	Rainbow Rowell with Faith Erin Hicks (Artist)	Pumpkinheads
2020	Danielle Vega	The Haunted
2020	Kim Liggett	The Unfortunates
2020	Karen McManus	Two Can Keep a Secret
2020	Jenni Hendriks and Ted Caplan	UNpregnant
2020	Malala Yousafzai	We Are Displaced: My Journey and Stories From Refugee Girls Around the World
2021	Gretchen McNeil	#NoEscape
2021	Mindy McGinnis	Be Not Far From Me
2021	Joseph Bruchac	Found
2021	Carl Deuker	Golden Arm
2021	Alice Oseman	Heartstopper Vol. 1
2021	Jason Reynolds with Danica Novgorodoff (Illus.)	Long Way Down: The Graphic Novel
2021	Ibi Zoboi and Yusef Salaam	Punching the Air
2021	Kat Leyh	Snapdragon
2021	Ben Oliver	The Loop
2021	Leah Johnson	You Should See Me in a Crown
2022	B. B. Alston	Amari and the Night Brothers
2022	Dusti Bowling	The Canyon's Edge
2022	Crystal Frasier with Val Wise (Art)	Cheer Up! Love and Pompoms
2022	Abby Howard	The Crossroads at Midnight
2022	Lee Knox Ostertag	The Girl from the Sea
2022	L. L. McKinney	Nubia: Real One
2022	Isaac Fitzsimons	The Passing Playbook
2022	Christian Allaire	The Power of Style: How Fashion and Beauty Are Being Used to Reclaim Cultures
2022	Lily Sparks	Teen Killers Club
2022	Sugar Rodgers	They Better Call Me Sugar: My Journey from the Hood to the Hardwood
2023	Tyler Page	Button Pusher
2023	Kate McLaughlin	Daughter
2023	Victoria Fulton and Faith McClaren	Horror Hotel
2023	Melanie Crowder	Jumper
2023	Gabby Noone	Live, Laugh, Kidnap
2023	Ebony LaDelle	Love Radio
2023	Rex Ogle	Punching Bag
2023	April Henry	Two Truths and a Lie
2023	Karen M. McManus	You'll Be the Death of Me
2023	Johnnie Christmas	Swim Team
2024	Ann Davila	Breakup from Hell
2024	Lynn Painter	The Do-Over
2024	Holly Jackson	Five Survive
2024	Ripley Jones	Missing Clarissa
2024	Nick Brooks	Promise Boys
2024	Aimee Carter	Royal Blood
2024	Kristen Lee	Sun Keep Rising
2024	Kayvion Lewis	Thieves’ Gambit
2024	Bridget Farr	The Truth About Everything
2024	Dan Santat	A First Time for Everything
2025	Ian X. Cho	Aisle Nine
2025	Candace Fleming	The Enigma Girls: How Ten Teenagers Broke Ciphers
2025	Erin Hahn	Even if It Breaks Your Heart
2025	Shawneè Gibbs and Shawnelle Gibbs	Ghost Roast
2025	Rebecca Hirsch	A Deathly Compendium of Poisonous Plants
2025	Megan Lally	That’s Not My Name
2025	Amber McBride, Erica Martin, and Taylor Byas (edited)	Poemhood: Our Black Revival: History, Folklore, and the Black Experience: A Young Adult Poetry Anthology
2025	Theo Parish	Homebody
2025	Scott Reintgen	The Last Dragon on Mars
2025	Jenna Voris	Every Time You Hear That Song
