= Jason Reynolds =

American young adult author (born 1983)

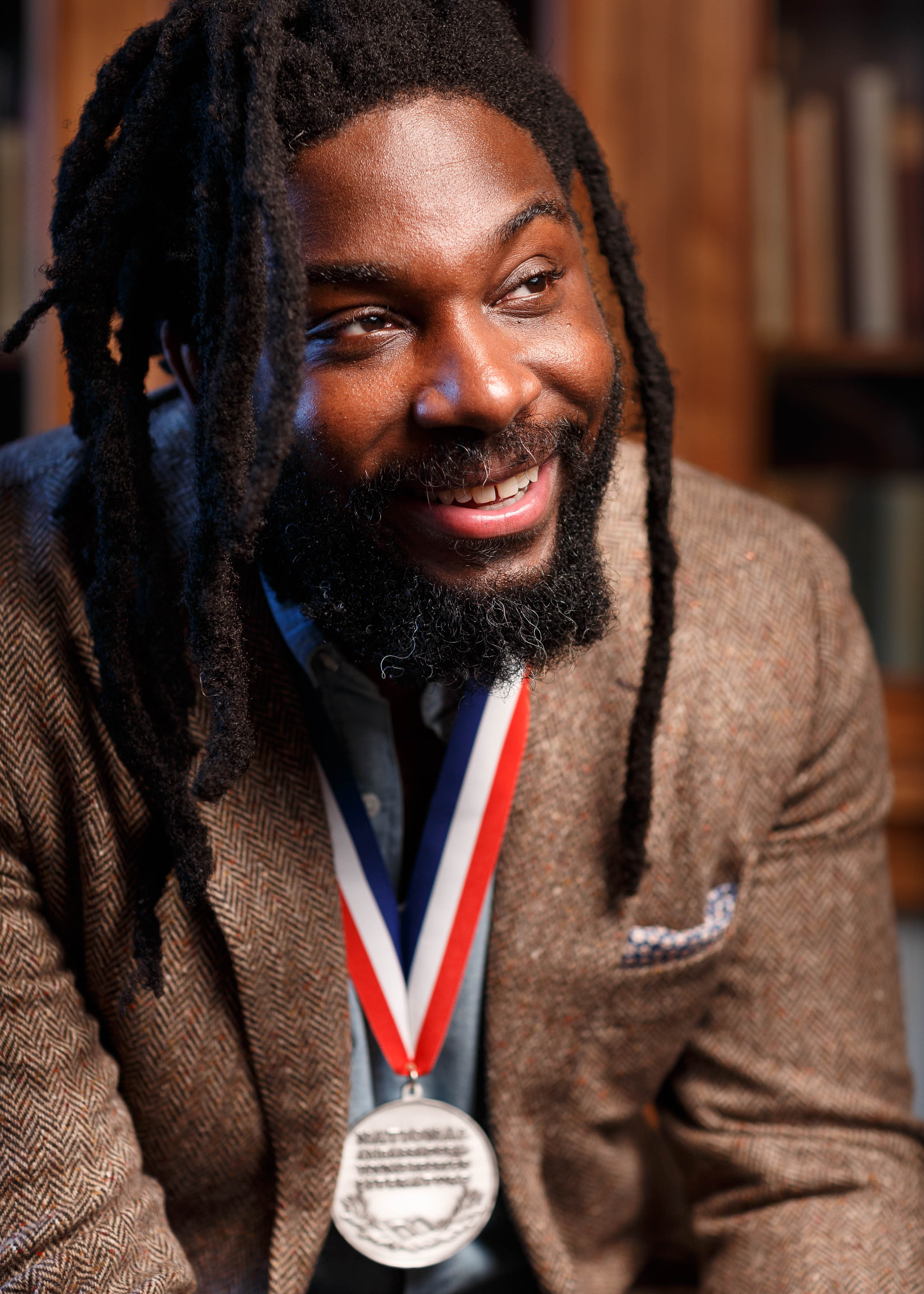
- Reynolds in 2020
- Born: December 6, 1983 (age 42); Washington, D.C., U.S.
- Education: University of Maryland
- Occupation: Writer
- Writing career
- Language: English
- Genre: Young adult fiction
- Notable works: All American Boys (2015); When I Was the Greatest; Boy in the Black Suit; As Brave as You; Ghost (Track series); Miles Morales: Spider-Man; Long Way Down; Look Both Ways
- Notable awards: Coretta Scott King Award; NAACP Image Award; Carnegie Medal; Margaret A. Edwards Award; MacArthur Fellowship
- Website: jasonwritesbooks.com

Jason Reynolds (born December 6, 1983) is an American author of novels and poetry for young adult middle grade audiences. Born in Washington, D.C., and raised in neighboring Oxon Hill, Maryland, Reynolds found inspiration in rap and had an early focus on poetry, publishing many poetry collections before his first novel in 2014, When I Was the Greatest, which won the John Steptoe Award for New Talent.

In the next four years, Reynolds wrote eight more novels, most notably the New York Times best-selling Track series — Ghost (2016), Patina (2017), Sunny (2018), Lu (2018) — and As Brave as You (2016). Ghost was a finalist for the National Book Award for Young People's Literature and As Brave as You won the Kirkus Prize, the NAACP Image Award for Outstanding Literary Work for Youth/Teen, and the Schneider Family Book Award. Reynolds also wrote a Marvel Comics novel called Miles Morales: Spider-Man (2017).

In 2017, Reynolds returned to poetry with Long Way Down, a novel in verse that was named a Newbery Honor book, a Michael L. Printz Honor Book, and best young adult work by the Mystery Writers of America's Edgar Awards. In 2019, he wrote Look Both Ways, for which he won a Carnegie Medal.

From 2020 to 2022, Reynolds was the Library of Congress' National Ambassador for Young People's Literature.

In 2023, Reynolds won the Margaret A. Edwards Award.

In 2024, Reynolds was named a MacArthur Fellow.

== Early life, education and influences ==
Reynolds was born on December 6, 1983, in Washington, DC, and grew up in Oxon Hill, a neighborhood where his mother, a special education teacher in a public school, could afford a house with a yard and enough space for Reynolds, his three siblings and other family members.

At nine years old, Reynolds began writing poetry after being inspired by Queen Latifah's third album, Black Reign. Queen Latifah and other rappers, like Tupac and Biggie, influenced him and resonated with his childhood experiences in the 1980s and 1990s; he didn't start reading books until he was 17.

One of Reynolds's earliest poems dealt with his grandmother's death in 1994 when he was 10. He wrote a few lines in an effort to console his mother, who printed the poem on the program for the funeral, and after that Reynolds wrote poems as each of his grandmother's siblings passed. Moved by these experiences of "the power of language", he continued to pursue poetry through high school, graduating from Bishop McNamara High School in 2000, and college, even after receiving lackluster grades and being discouraged by English professors at the University of Maryland. Nonetheless, he graduated with a BA in English.

While an undergraduate, Reynolds began to collaborate with Jason Griffin, who became his roommate, and first heard spoken word and began performing, including eventually solo shows, and published his first book in 2001, a poetry collection called Let Me Speak.

As a college student, Reynolds also worked at a DC bookstore chain called Karibu Books, which specialized in African-American literature. At Karibu he encountered prose that resonated with him for the first time, such as Richard Wright's novel Black Boy. Enthralled with Wright's novel from the first page, Reynolds next began making his way through the great works of African-American literature that he found on the store's shelves, reading James Baldwin, Zora Neale Hurston, and Toni Morrison. At Karibu Books, he encountered street fiction, also known as urban fiction, which is a literary genre Reynolds compares to rap's capacity for being "raw and honest. For some kids, this was their life."

== Personal life ==
Reynolds moved back to Washington, D.C., from Brooklyn in 2016. He collects items related to African-American literature, including a letter by Langston Hughes, a pre-publication review copy of Claude Brown's Manchild in the Promised Land and an autographed first edition copy of Toni Morrison's Beloved. He appeared on Antiques Roadshow in 2021 to discuss his collecting.

== Selected works ==
Reynolds does not start with a particular age audience in mind; instead he focuses on trying to write the voice of his characters authentically and lets that dictate whom the book would appeal to. All of his writings feature minority characters, which he sees as a reflection of the modern world.

Reynolds's first adult novel, Father, Father, will be published in June 2027. It follows two brothers on a cross-country road trip after their father's death as they confront memories of him.

=== Early works ===
After graduating from college, Reynolds moved to New York with a classmate, Jason Griffin; in 2005, the pair self-published a collaboration, collecting Griffin's visual art and Reynolds's poetry, called SELF. The book earned the pair an agent and then a book contract. Four years later they published My Name Is Jason. Mine Too.: Our Story. Our Way, a memoir about moving to New York to pursue their dreams, expressed through Reynolds's poetry and Griffin's illustrations. They published the book with the HarperTeen imprint of HarperCollins, working with editor Joanna Cotler (after Cotler retired, she referred him to Caitlin Dlouhy, who would become the editor on his next seven books). In the meantime, Reynolds moved home to DC in 2008 after losing his apartment in New York. He worked at a department store—the Lord & Taylor in North Bethesda, Maryland—to pay the bills, going to a Borders bookstore on his lunch break to see his book arrive on the shelf in 2009. Next, he became a caseworker in a mental health clinic his father directed.

Eventually, Reynolds returned to New York, again working in retail while he applied to graduate school, unsuccessfully because of his college grades. Nevertheless, he began writing a young adult novel—"often while standing at the cash register when business was slow" at the Rag & Bone store he managed—spurred by his friend Chris Myers, son of Walter Dean Myers and himself an author and illustrator. Reynolds had told Chris he had basically stopped writing, but Chris pointed out that with his father aging (the elder Myers died in 2014), there would soon be a shortage of new works written about young black children, particularly black boys. He suggested Reynolds look at some of his father's old works, and The Young Landlords particularly connected with Reynolds; the work gave Reynolds the confidence to "write in my voice, use my tongue, my language, my style, and write a story. Before that I always felt like I wasn't good enough because I wasn't Baldwin, or Toni Mor, or Richard Wright", but after reading Myers's work, "the floodgates were opened."

In 2014, Reynolds published When I Was The Greatest (with the Atheneum Books imprint of Simon & Schuster), a young adult novel set in Reynolds' own neighborhood of Bedford-Stuyvesant. For the work, Reynolds won the 2015 Coretta Scott King/John Steptoe Award for New Talent from the American Library Association.

In 2015, Reynolds published The Boy in the Black Suit, about a child grieving the loss of his mother. It won a Coretta Scott King Honor from the American Library Association.

=== All American Boys (2015) ===
Also in 2015, Reynolds published All American Boys, co-authored with Brendan Kiely. The book depicts a black teenager assaulted in a convenience store by a white police officer who wrongly suspects him of stealing. The book is written in two voices, with Reynolds writing from the point of view of the teenaged victim, Rashad Butler, in a hospital bed, while Kiely wrote the character Quinn Collins, a white teenager and family friend of the police officer, who witnessed the violent attack. In a review for The New York Times, Kelka Magoon found both main characters "successfully drawn" and called the novel "a book to be grappled with, challenged by, and discussed. All American Boys represents one voice—even better, two voices—in a national conversation that must continue beyond its pages."

The book arose from personal conversations between Reynolds, who is black, and Kiely, who is white. The two met on a Simon & Schuster book tour in 2013, which coincided with the news that George Zimmerman had been acquitted of the murder of Trayvon Martin. Though strangers, Reynolds and Kiely began to share their feelings, each finding the other was "as frustrated as angry and as confused as I was", as Reynolds put it. A friendship developed and the conversations continued with increasing urgency; after a white police officer shot and killed Michael Brown, Kiely reached out to Reynolds to propose they write a book addressing police brutality and racial profiling.

The book won the inaugural Walter Dean Myers Award from the We Need Diverse Books organization, as well as a Coretta Scott King Honor.

=== As Brave as You (2016) ===
In 2016, Reynolds published As Brave as You, which won the 2016 Kirkus Prize, the 2017 NAACP Image Award for Outstanding Literary Work for Youth/Teen, the 2017 Schneider Family Book Award, and the 2017 Coretta Scott King Honor. The book describes two African-American brothers from Brooklyn who are sent to spend the summer with their grandfather in Virginia. In The Washington Post, a reviewer said, "Reynolds deftly blends humor and heart through lively dialogue and spot-on sibling dynamics."

=== Track series (2016–2025) ===
The Track series follows a different protagonist in each novel, all of whom are members of the Defenders, an elite track team. In 2016, Reynolds published Ghost, a National Book Award Finalist for Young People's Literature. Reviewing Ghost in The New York Times, Kate Messner said that in his title character, Reynolds has created a protagonist "whose journey is so genuine that he's worthy of a place alongside Ramona and Joey Pigza on the bookshelves where our most beloved, imperfect characters live." Ghost was published by the Caitlyn Dlouhy imprint of Atheneum on August 30, 2016.

Three more books have followed in the series. Patina (2017) depicts another young star runner, Patina "Patty" Jones. Patty feels out of place at her nearly all-white private school. Patty and her younger sister live with their dead father's brother and his white wife because their birth mother is unable to take care of them after losing her legs due to diabetes. Critics noted the deft way the book handles many issues including teamwork and non-traditional family structures. This was the first book Reynolds had written with a female point of view. Reynolds wanted to write about the special burdens some teen girls assume in their families. In his The New York Times review, Tom Rinaldi called the novel "excellent". The book was also well received by other reviewers, earning a starred review in Kirkus Reviews, School Library Journal, The Horn Book Magazine, and Booklist.

The third installment in the series, called Sunny, was released on April 10, 2018. Paste magazine named the audiobook, narrated by Guy Lockard, one of the 13 best of 2018 to date, saying, "The whole series is a must-listen, but Sunny is a particular treat" thanks to the Lockard's portrayal of the "lolling, goofball voice" of the novel's first-person protagonist.

The fourth installment in the series, called Lu, was released October 23, 2018.

The fifth book in the series, Coach, was released on October 14, 2025.

=== Miles Morales: Spider-Man (2017) ===
Reynolds is the author of Miles Morales: Spider-Man (2017), a novel based on the Marvel Comics' Afro-Puerto Rican teen character. Reynolds has described his ambitions for the book as similar to Jordan Peele's approach to Get Out, namely to engage the audience with systemic social issues by "distill[ing] it down to a single family." Speaking to School Library Journal, Reynolds said, "It was a trip to take these issues I care so much about and figure out what they look like as a person. What do they sound like? How do they dress? How do they act? What do they do?" Reviewing the book for the Washington City Paper, Kayla Randall said, "The result...was exceptional."

=== Long Way Down (2017) ===
Reynolds's 2017 book, Long Way Down, is a novel written in verse. It describes a 15-year-old who sees his brother shot to death, drawing on Reynolds's experience of having a friend murdered when Reynolds was 19. Reynolds was moved to write the book by his visits to juvenile detention centers, where he frequently encounters children caught in a cycle of violence that, under slightly different circumstances, might have been his own: Reynolds has said that after his own friend's murder, he and other friends planned to seek revenge but never did so as the perpetrator wasn't conclusively identified, something he looked back on and "realized how lucky that was." Long Way Down was named a 2018 Newbery Honor book by the American Library Association, a Michael L. Printz Honor Book, best young adult work at the Mystery Writers of America's Edgar Awards, a Walter Dean Myers Award from the We Need Diverse Books organization, a Coretta Scott King Honor, and a finalist for the NAACP Image Award for Outstanding Literary Work for Youth/Teens. An adaptation by Martine Kei Green-Rogers of Long Way Down was commissioned by the Kennedy Center and performed at the Kennedy Center's Family Theater in October/November 2018.

In October 2020, a graphic novel edition of Long Way Down was published with art by Danica Novgorodoff.

=== For Every One (2018) ===
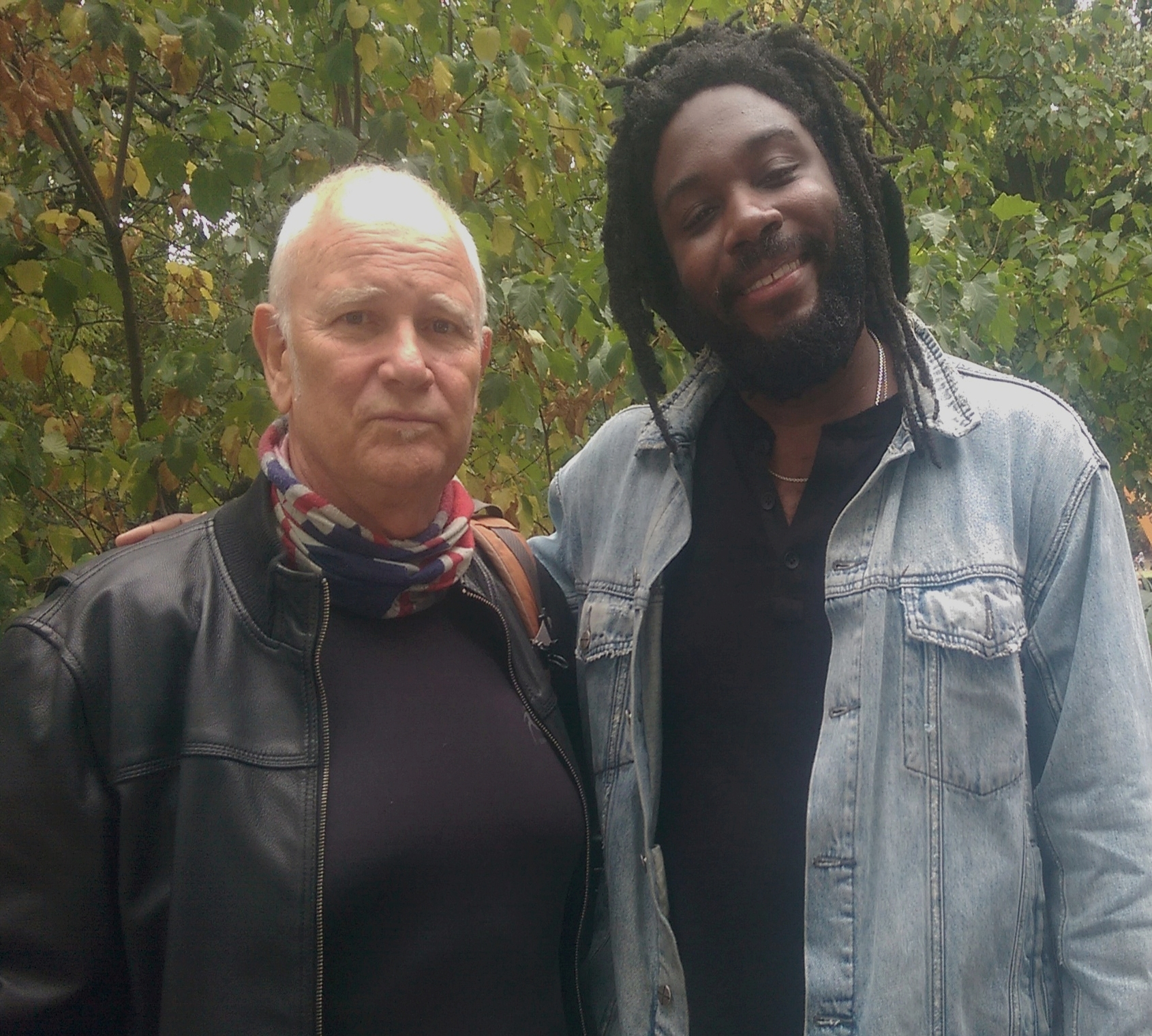
Reynolds and psychologist Manfred Günther, Library Festival Berlin 2018

On April 10, 2018, Reynolds released For Every One, a work of poetry. He originally performed the poem at the unveiling of the Martin Luther King Jr. Memorial at the Kennedy Center. Two weeks later, Reynolds occupied three slots on The New York Times best-seller lists for children's literature: two on the young adult hardcover list (Long Way Down and For Every One), and one on the children's series list for the Track series.

=== "Ten Things I've Been Meaning to Say to You" (2018) ===
Reynolds published a list for teenagers with 10 things he thought they should know about life and their futures. It was posted on May 28, 2018, on Powell's Book Blog.

=== Look Both Ways: A Tale Told in Ten Blocks (2019) ===
Look Both Ways was published on October 8, 2019. The story is told across ten blocks in different perspectives as middle schoolers walk home from school. On the day of its release, Look Both Ways became a finalist for the National Book Award and later made the New York Times Best Sellers List. Jason Reynolds explained that he wanted to explore kids' autonomy in this book, saying, "It is a time when they are unsupervised" and they "get to learn about the world on their own, for better or for worse." He won the 2021 Carnegie Medal for the book.

=== Stamped: Racism, Antiracism, and You (2019–2021) ===
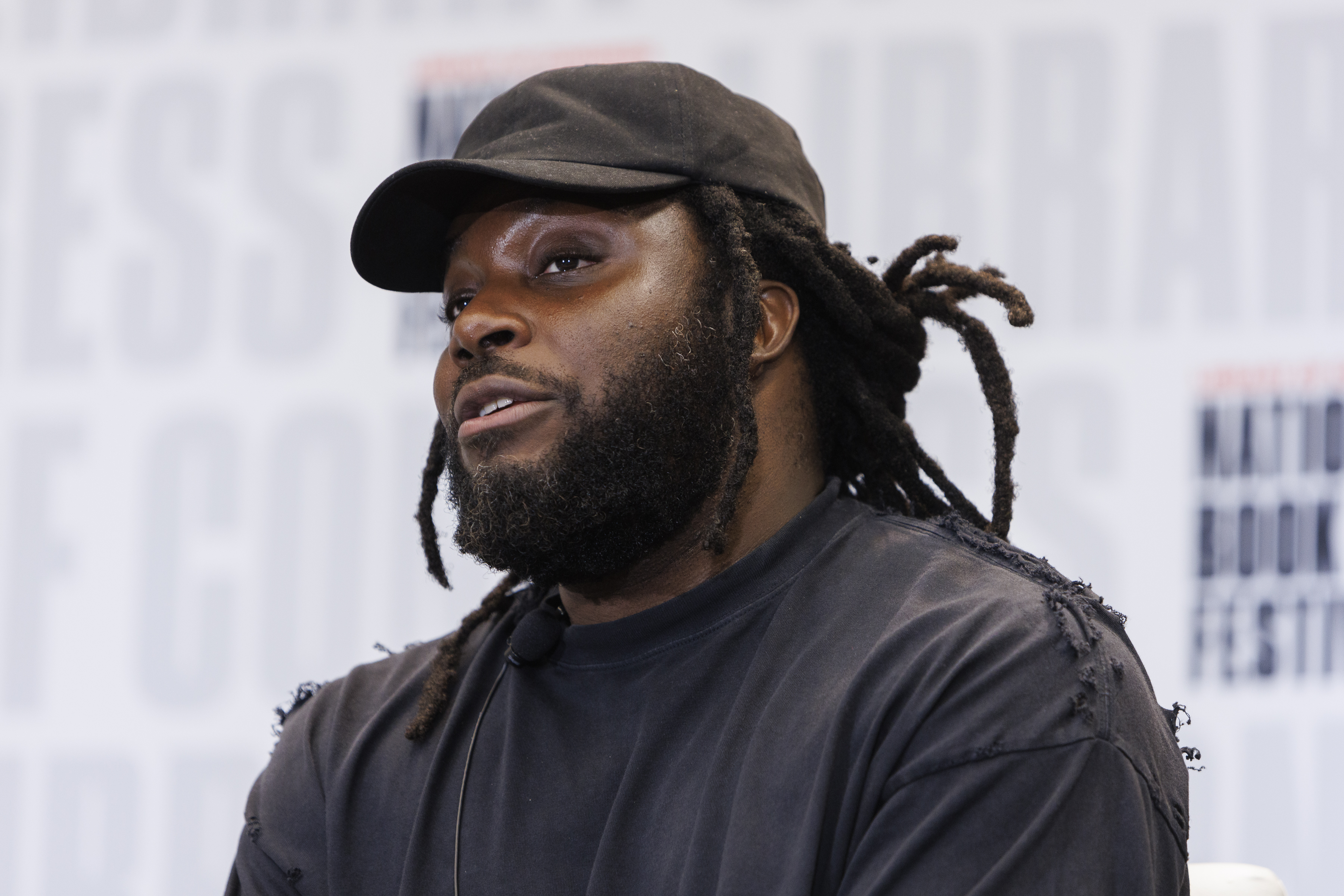
Reynolds at the National Book Festival in 2022

Reynolds announced Stamped: Racism, Antiracism, and You in August 2019 in collaboration with Ibram X. Kendi. Releasing in March 2020, Reynolds' book is an adaptation of Kendi's book Stamped from the Beginning, which won the National Book Award in 2016. The book is for teens and young adults and serves to start a conversation among them about race and racism in America. Reynolds says, "I think that we have a rare opportunity to give the historical context of how we made it here today. This is the definitive history of race in America from the 1400s to today. It isn't about how to fix it per se. It's just about contextualizing why it is the way it is."

In 2021, Reynolds, alongside Kendi and Sonja Cherry-Paul, published Stamped (For Kids): Racism, Antiracism, and You, which was illustrated by Rachelle Baker. The book is a New York Times best seller.

=== Podcast series, Radiotopia presents: My Mother Made Me (2022) ===
In 2022, Reynolds wrote and hosted My Mother Made Me, a podcast he made in collaboration with Radiotopia. The podcast description reads, "My Mother Made Me is a four-episode series from Radiotopia Presents, where writer Jason Reynolds and his mother, Isabell, explore their shared history, how she raised him, and what they’re teaching each other. They go deep – birth, death, spirituality… but they also keep it light: pushing a cart through Costco, birthday lunches, and hitting the casino together. That’s just how they do."

=== There Was a Party for Langston (2023) ===
Reynolds released his first picture book for kids, There Was a Party for Langston, in 2023. Jerome Pumphrey and Jarrett Pumphrey illustrated the book. Reynolds was inspired by a photograph of writers Maya Angelou and Amiri Baraka dancing at a party at the New York Public Library’s Schomburg Center for Research in Black Culture. The party was for the grand opening of the Langston Hughes Auditorium in the center. He wanted the book to evoke the feeling of "rumpus time." He has also said the book is not just about Langston Hughes but also libraries and how they can be joyous places: "I want to bring to life the fact — which I wish I had known as a kid — that libraries are places for dancing and for self-expression."

== Selected awards and honors ==
Selected accolades for Jason Reynolds
Year	Work	Accolade	Result	Ref.
2015	When I Was the Greatest	John Steptoe New Talent Author Award	Winner	
2016	Ghost	National Book Award for Young People's Literature	Finalist	
2016	All American Boys	Walter Dean Myers Award	Winner	
2016	All American Boys	Coretta Scott King Award	Honor	
2016	The Boy in the Black Suit	Coretta Scott King Award	Honor	
2017	Ghost	American Library Association's Best Fiction for Young Adults	Top 10	
2017	As Brave as You	Coretta Scott King Award	Honor	
2017	As Brave as You	NAACP Image Award for Outstanding Literary Work for Youth/Teens	Winner	
2017	Ghost	Odyssey Award	Honor	
2018	Long Way Down	Coretta Scott King Award	Honor	
2018	Long Way Down	Edgar Award for Best Young Adult Work	Winner	
2018	Long Way Down	NAACP Image Award for Outstanding Literary Work for Youth/Teens	Finalist	
2018	Long Way Down	Newbery Medal	Honor	
2018	Long Way Down	Michael L. Printz Award	Honor	
2019	Look Both Ways	National Book Award for Young People's Literature	Finalist	
2020	Look Both Ways	Coretta Scott King Award	Honor	
2021	Look Both Ways	Carnegie Medal	Winner	
2023	When I Was the Greatest (2014); All American Boys (2015); Long Way Down (2017)	Margaret Edwards Award	Winner	
2024	The Collectors: Stories	Michael L. Printz Award	Winner	
2025	Twenty-Four Seconds from Now...: A LOVE Story	Coretta Scott King Author Award	Winner	

=== Honors ===
- 2020 National Ambassador for Young People's Literature at the Library of Congress
- 2024 MacArthur Fellow

== Publications ==
=== Standalone books ===
- —— (2001). Let Me Speak. Baltimore: Mwaza Publications. ISBN 9780971766341.
- —— (2005). Self. Co-written with Jason Griffin. Mwaza Publications. ISBN 9780971766389.
- —— (2009). My Name Is Jason. Mine Too.: Our Story. Our Way. Illustrations by Jason Griffin. HarperTeen. ISBN 9780061547881.
- —— (2014). When I Was the Greatest. New York: Atheneum Books for Young Readers. ISBN 9781442459472.
- —— (2015). The Boy in the Black Suit. New York: Atheneum Books for Young Readers. ISBN 9781442459502.
- —— (2015). All American Boys. Co-written by Brendan Kiely. New York: Atheneum Books for Young Readers. ISBN 9781481463331.
- —— (2016). As Brave as You. New York: Atheneum Books for Young Readers. ISBN 9781481415903.
- —— (2017). Miles Morales, Spider-Man. Illustrated by Kadir Nelson. New York and Los Angeles: Marvel. ISBN 9781484787489.
- —— (2017). Long Way Down. New York: Atheneum. ISBN 9781481438254.
- —— (2018). For Every One. New York: Atheneum. ISBN 9781481486248.
- —— (2019). Look Both Ways: A Tale Told in Ten Blocks. Illustrated by Alexander Nabaum. New York: Atheneum. ISBN 9781481438285.
- —— (2020). Stamped: Racism, Antiracism, and You. Co-written by Ibram X. Kendi. New York: Little, Brown and Company. ISBN 9780316453691.
- —— (2020). Stamped (for Kids): Racism, Antiracism, and You. Co-written by Ibram X. Kendi, adapted by Sonja Cherry-Paul, and illustrated by Rachelle Baker. New York: Little, Brown and Company. ISBN 9780316453691.
- —— (2022). Ain't Burned All the Bright. Artwork by Jason Griffin. New York: Atheneum. ISBN 9781534439467.
- —— (2023). There Was a Party for Langston. Artwork by Jerome Pumphrey and Jarrett Pumphrey. New York: Simon & Schuster. ISBN 9781534439443.
- —— (2024). Twenty-four Seconds from Now. New York: Atheneum. ISBN 9781665961271.
- —— (2026). Soundtrack. Crown Books for Young Readers. ISBN 9798217231591.

=== Stuntboy series ===
- —— (2021). Stuntboy, in the Meantime. Drawings by Raúl the Third. New York: Atheneum Books for Young Readers. ISBN 9781534418165.
- —— (2023). Stuntboy, In-Between Time. Drawings by Raúl the Third. New York: Atheneum Books for Young Readers. ISBN 9781534418226.

=== Track series ===
- —— (2016). Ghost. New York: Atheneum Books for Young Readers. ISBN 9781481450157.
- —— (2017). Patina. New York: Atheneum Books for Young Readers. ISBN 9781481450188.
- —— (2018). Sunny. New York: Atheneum Books for Young Readers. ISBN 9781481450218.
- —— (2018). Lu. New York: Atheneum Books for Young Readers. ISBN 9781481450249.
- —— (2025). Coach. New York: Atheneum Books for Young Readers. ISBN 9798347102372.

== Podcast series ==
- Radiotopia presents: My Mother Made Me (2022)

== See also ==
- Tomi Adeyemi, 21st-century African-American young adult novelist
- Eve Ewing, 21st-century African-American poet and scholar of education
- Ronald L. Smith, 21st-century African-American children's book author
- Javaka Steptoe, 21st-century African-American children's book author and illustrator
- Angie Thomas, 21st-century African-American young adult novelist
