= All American Boys =

2015 young adult novel by Jason Reynolds and Brendan Kiely

- 2015 cover
- Author: Jason Reynolds, Brendan Kiely
- Language: English
- Publisher: Simon & Schuster
- Publication date: September 29, 2015
- Publication place: United States
- Pages: 310
- ISBN: 978-1481463331
- Website: Official website

All American Boys, published in 2015 by Atheneum, is a young adult novel written by Jason Reynolds and Brendan Kiely. The book tells the story of two teenage boys, Rashad Butler and Quinn Collins, as they handle racism and police brutality in their community. The novel has gained attention in recent years, becoming the 26th most banned book of 2022, due to its inclusion of anti-police messages, alcohol, drug usage, and profanity.

== Background and publication ==
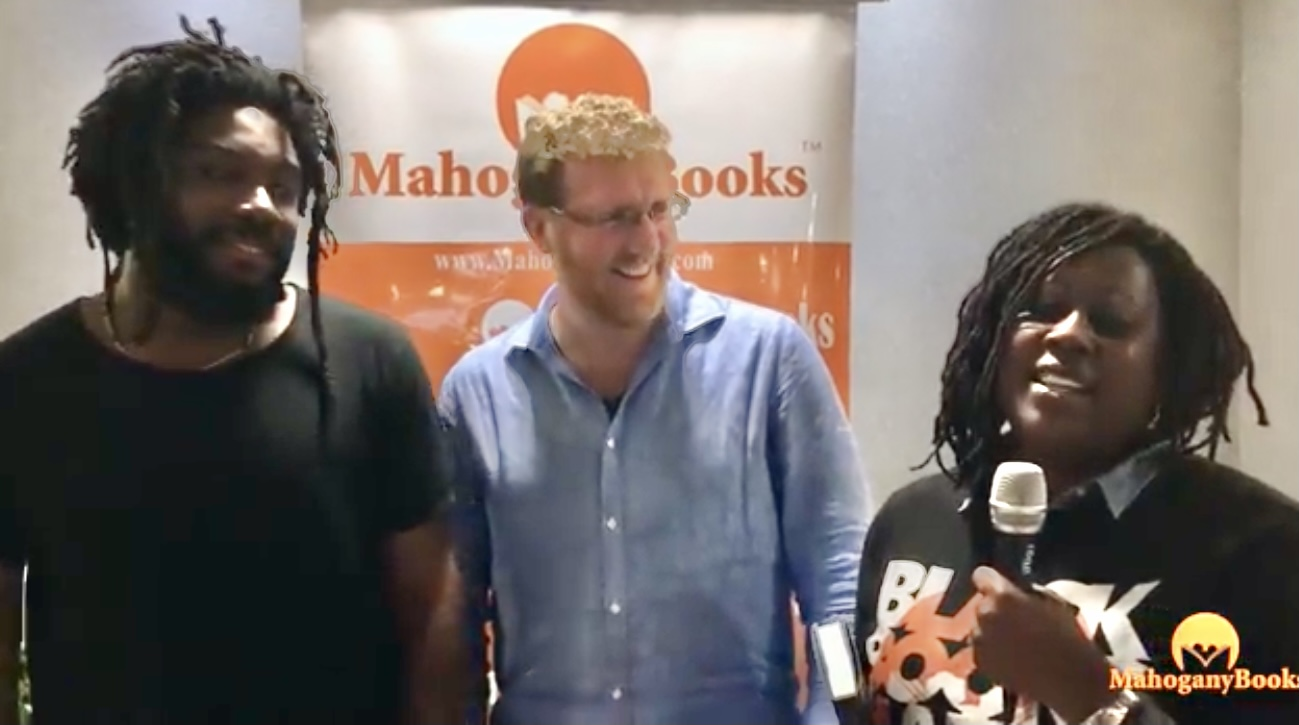
Reynolds (left) and Kiely discuss All American Boys in 2016

Jason Reynolds and Brendan Kiely met on a Simon & Schuster book tour in 2013. While sharing a room on the book tour, they heard the news that George Zimmerman had been acquitted of the murder of Trayvon Martin. Reynolds and Kiely began to share their feelings and frustrations, developing a friendship. After Michael Brown was shot and killed in Ferguson on August 9, 2014, Reynolds and Kiely began writing All American Boys as a way to address police brutality and racial profiling. The book was published in 2015 by Simon & Schuster.

== Plot ==
The book follows two characters, Rashad Butler and Quinn Collins, as they navigate racism; Rashad, written by Jason Reynolds, is a black boy who was beaten by a policeman when he was believed to be stealing, and ends up absent from school due to injuries, with his case becoming controversial throughout his neighborhood. Quinn, written by Brendan Kiely, is a white boy in the same grade and the same age as Rashad, who is a family friend to the officer, and is a witness to the incident.

== Analysis ==
=== Educational uses ===
According to professor Luke Rodesiler's suggested lesson plan concerning All American Boys, the novel provides educators with many opportunities to discuss current social and political issues including police violence, racism, athletes as activists, and protesting. Rodesiler recommends that educators have their students complete projects such as researching incidents of police violence and studying judicial rulings on student protests and police violence as a way to connect All American Boys to American society. High school teachers Jody Pollock and Tashema Spence-Davis provide a model to incorporate All American Boys into a curriculum to increase students’ understanding of socio-political issues. This novel helped uplift their majority-minority and marginalized students by initiating conversations about racial bias and equity. As Rodesiler explains, teachers can frame discussion questions around each issue, prompting students to identify social justice issues throughout the novel, and connect them to current-day America.

== Reception ==
=== Accolades ===
Accolades for All American Boys
Year	Accolade	Result	Ref.
2016	Walter Dean Myers Award	Winner	
2016	Coretta Scott King Award for Author	Honor	
2016	Amelia Elizabeth Walden Award for Young Adult Fiction		
2017	Pennsylvania Young Readers' Choice Award for Young Adults	Nominee	
2017	Rhode Island Teen Book Award	Nominee	
2017	Milwaukee County Teen Book Award	Nominee	
2017-2018	South Carolina Book Award for Young Adult	Nominee	

=== Reviews ===
Since its release in 2015, All American Boys has been praised by critics for its discussions of police brutality and racism. In a favorable review, Publishers Weekly called the novel “painful and all-too-timely." The review went on: “the scenario that Reynolds and Kiely depict has become a recurrent feature of news reports, and a book that lets readers think it through outside of the roiling emotions of a real-life event is both welcome and necessary." In her starred review in School Library Journal, Ashleigh Williams said that All American Boys is able to effectively illustrate the aftermath of police brutality through the conflicting emotions, which affect entire communities. Williams notes that the novel provides many diverse perspectives and emphasizes the tension between these perspectives resulting from racism and privilege. In his starred review, Booklist reviewer Michael Cart said that All American Boys starts a necessary dialogue surrounding race relations and police brutality. At the same time, Cart says, the novel is “more than a problem novel; it’s a carefully plotted, psychologically acute, character-driven work of fiction that dramatizes an all-too-frequent occurrence."

=== Censorship ===
In 2020, All American Boys landed the third position on the American Library Association's list of the most commonly banned and challenged books in the United States. The book was banned, challenged, and/or restricted "for profanity, drug use, and alcoholism, and because it was thought to promote anti-police views, contain divisive topics, and be 'too much of a sensitive matter right now.'"

==== South Carolina ====
In South Carolina, police have spoken out against the teaching of All American Boys in a Wando High School English class. The novel was one of eight choices for summer reading for incoming freshmen. Police argued that the novel teaches children to not trust police officers or law enforcement in general. The law enforcement union argued that students reading the novel at Wando are at an age where the majority of them have not had experiences with law enforcement, and are therefore very impressionable on the subject. The school librarian fought for the book to continue being taught, and criticized police in the area for not being open to having difficult discussions with students. The National Coalition Against Censorship wrote to the principal, urging them not to remove the book from Wando High School's curriculum. In response, Principal Dr. Sherry Eppelsheimer of Wando High School agreed to reconsider the decision on banning All American Boys.

==== Cornelius, North Carolina ====
Two parents, one of whom a police officer with children at Bailey Middle School in Cornelius, North Carolina, challenged All American Boys. Police officers, faculty members, and community members were all involved in the review process, with the school inviting officers to attend classes in which the novel was taught. After the review process, board members decided in September 2019 to keep the book as a part of the eighth-grade curriculum. Board members and leaders stated that the novel has the ability to open students' minds to social justice issues and contemporary issues they face.
