= List of young adult fiction writers =

This is a list of notable writers whose readership is predominantly teenagers or young adults, or adult fiction writers who have published significant works intended for teens/young adults. Examples of the author's more notable works are given here.

== A ==
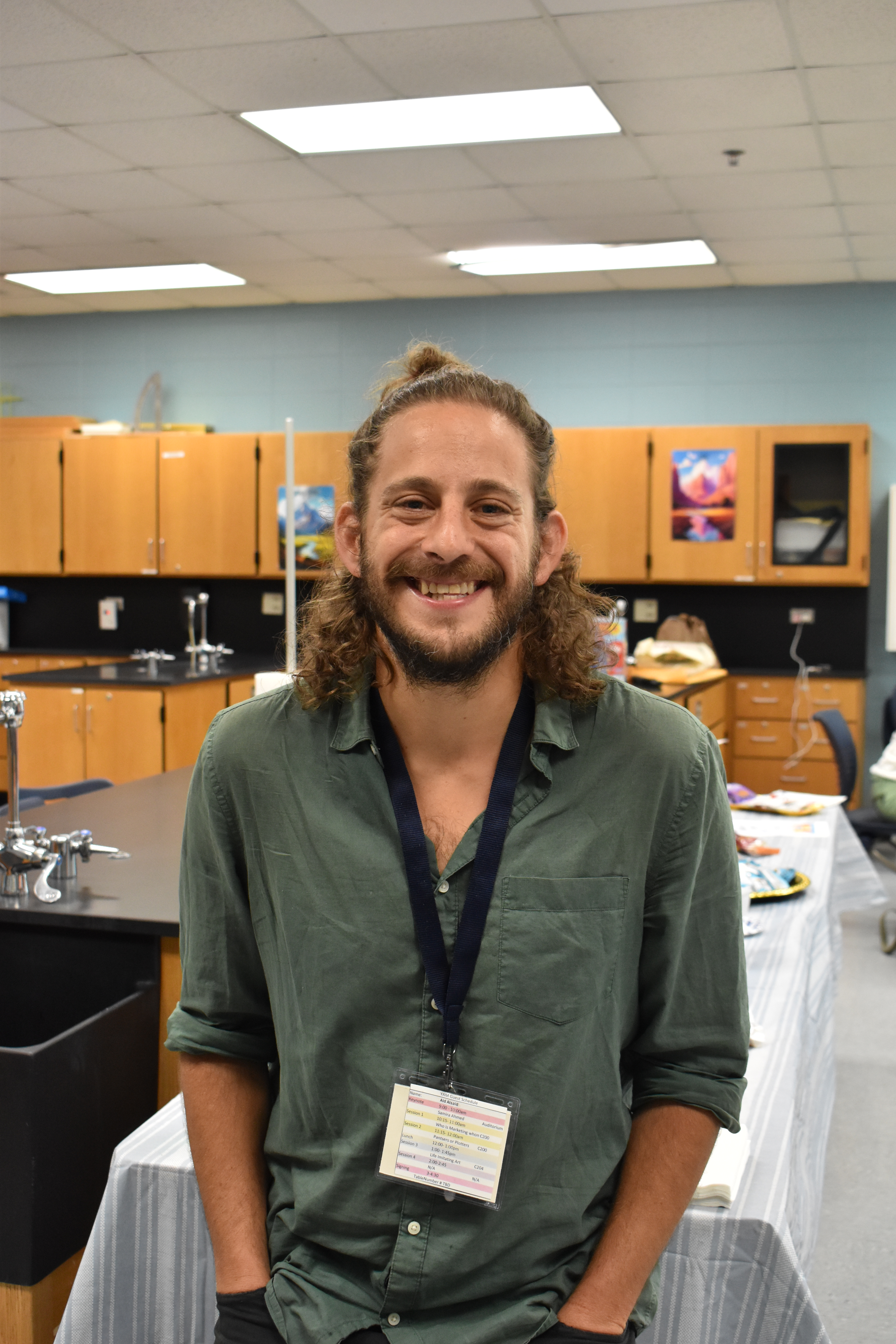
Adi Alsaid

- Atia Abawi: A Land of Permanent Goodbyes
- Joan Abelove: Go and Come Back, Saying It Out Loud, Lost and Found
- Hailey Abbott: The Secrets of Boys, Summer Boys, The Bridesmaid, The Perfect Boy
- Faridah Àbíké-Íyímídé: Ace of Spades
- Marguerite Abouet: Aya
- Elizabeth Acevedo: The Poet X, Clap When You Land, With the Fire on High
- Richard Adams: Watership Down, Shardik, The Plague Dogs
- Tomi Adeyemi: Children of Blood and Bone
- Alexandra Adornetto: Halo, Hades, Heaven
- Renée Ahdieh: The Wrath & the Dawn, Flame in the Mist
- Melissa Albert: The Hazel Wood
- Becky Albertalli: Simon vs. the Homo Sapiens Agenda, The Upside of Unrequited, Leah on the Offbeat
- Louisa May Alcott: Little Women, Jo's Boys, Eight Cousins
- Lloyd Alexander: The Prydain Chronicles, Westmark, The Kestrel, The Beggar Queen
- Sherman Alexie: The Absolutely True Diary of a Part-Time Indian
- S.K. Ali: Saints & Misfits, Love from A to Z
- Isabel Allende: City of the Beasts, Kingdom of the Golden Dragon, Forest of the Pygmies
- David Almond: Kit's Wilderness, Heaven Eyes, Clay
- Elaine M. Alphin: Counterfeit Son
- Adi Alsaid: Let's Get Lost, Never Always Sometimes
- Julia Alvarez: How the García Girls Lost Their Accents, Yo!, Before We Were Free
- Laurie Halse Anderson: Speak, Fever 1793, Catalyst, Prom, Twisted, Wintergirls
- M. T. Anderson: Feed, The Pox Party
- Jesse Andrews: Me and Earl and the Dying Girl
- V. C. Andrews: Flowers in the Attic
- Josephine Angelini: Starcrossed trilogy
- Anthony: A Journey, through Time, with Anthony
- Kim Antieau: Mercy, Unbound
- Allen Appel: Twice Upon a Time
- Jules Archer: The Plot to Seize the White House, The Incredible Sixties, Treason in America
- Jennifer Armentrout: Covenant series, Lux series, Dark Elements series, Cursed
- Kelley Armstrong: Darkest Powers
- Jay Asher: Thirteen Reasons Why, The Future of Us
- Amelia Atwater-Rhodes: Den of Shadows series, Kiesha'ra series
- Victoria Aveyard: Red Queen
- Avi: Nothing But the Truth, The True Confessions of Charlotte Doyle, Crispin: The Cross of Lead
- Nafiza Azad: The Candle and the Flame

== B ==
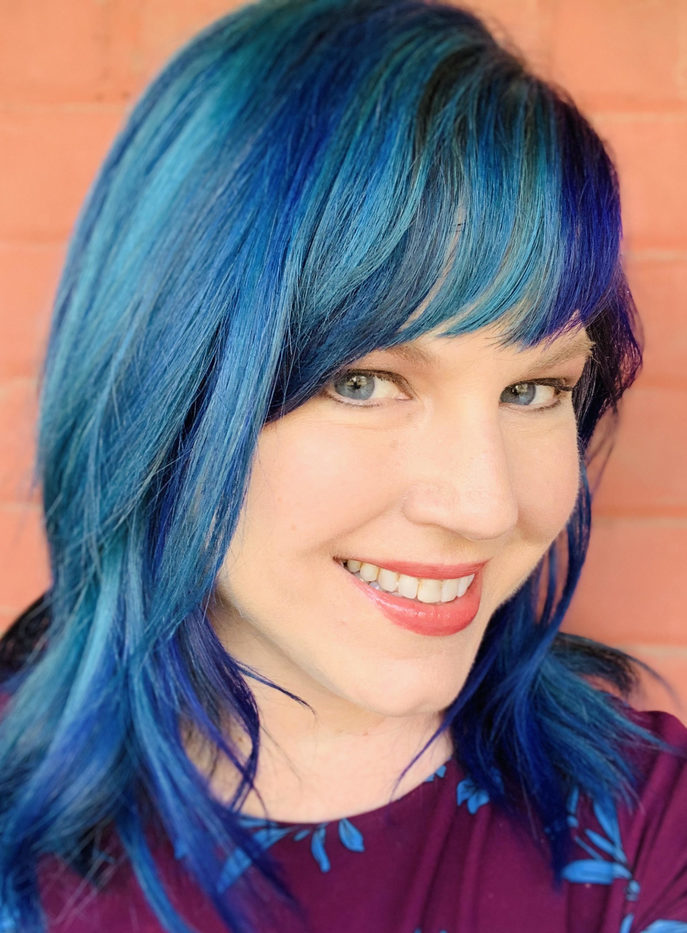
Gwenda Bond

- Natalie Babbitt: Tuck Everlasting
- Moa Backe Åstot: Fire from the Sky, Butterfly Heart
- Helen Bailey: Electra Brown series
- Catherine Banner: The Last Descendants series
- Leigh Bardugo: Shadow and Bone, Six of Crows
- Clive Barker: Abarat series
- Jennifer Lynn Barnes: The Inheritance Games series, Debutantes series, The Fixer series, The Naturals series
- T. A. Barron: The Ancient One
- John Barrowman and Carole Barrowman: Hollow Earth
- Karen Bass: Graffiti Knight
- Cat Bauer: Harley's Ninth, Harley, Like a Person
- Joan Bauer: Rules of the Road, Squashed, Stand Tall, Hope Was Here
- Michael Gerard Bauer: The Running Man, Don't Call Me Ishmael
- L. Frank Baum: Aunt Jane's Nieces series
- Patricia Beatty: Lupita Mañana, Charley Skedaddle, Eight Mules from Monterey, Bonanza Girl, Turn Homeward, Hannalee
- Margaret Bechard: Hanging onto Max, Star Hatchling, Spacer and Rat, If It Doesn't Kill You
- David Belbin: Love Lessons, Festival, Denial, The Last Virgin, Dead Guilty
- Clare Bell: Ratha series
- Robin Benway: Far from the Tree
- Steve Berman: Vintage, a Ghost Story
- Julie Berry: All the Truth That's in Me
- Chetan Bhagat: Five Point Someone, Revolution 2020
- Tanaz Bhathena: A Girl Like That, The Beauty of the Moment
- Lisa Jenn Bigelow: Hazel's Theory of Evolution
- Franny Billingsley: The Folk Keeper, Chime
- Holly Black: The Spiderwick Chronicles, Modern Faerie Tales, The Folk of the Air series
- Malorie Blackman: Noughts and Crosses series
- Francesca Lia Block: Weetzie Bat, Witch Baby, Baby Be-Bop, Cherokee Bat and the Goat Guys
- Judy Blume: Forever, Tiger Eyes, Are You There God? It's Me, Margaret
- Gwenda Bond: Stranger Things: Suspicious Minds, Girl on a Wire series, Lois Lane series, Match Made in Hell series
- Frank Bonham: Durango Street
- Angeline Boulley: Firekeeper's Daughter
- Natasha Bowen: Skin of the Sea
- Tim Bowler: River Boy, Apocalypse, Starseeker
- Akemi Dawn Bowman: Starfish
- Alexandra Bracken: The Darkest Minds
- Ann Brashares: The Sisterhood of the Traveling Pants
- Liz Braswell: The Nine Lives of Chloe King series
- Libba Bray: A Great and Terrible Beauty, Rebel Angels, The Sweet Far Thing, Beauty Queens, The Diviners
- Heather Brewer: The Chronicles of Vladimir Tod series
- Kate Brian: The Virginity Club, Private series
- Rae Bridgman: The Serpent's Spell, Amber Ambrosia, Fish & Sphinx
- Lauren Brooke: Heartland series, Chestnut Hill series
- Kevin Brooks: Candy, Martyn Pig, The Road of the Dead
- Vera Brosgol: Anya's Ghost
- Roseanne A. Brown: A Song of Wraiths and Ruin
- N. M. Browne: Warriors of Alavna, Wolf Blood, Shadow Web
- Alyssa Brugman: Walking Naked
- Annie Bryant: Beacon Street Girls series
- Elizabeth C. Bunce: A Curse Dark as Gold, Thief Errant series StarCrossed, Liar's Moon
- Eve Bunting: A Sudden Silence
- Melvin Burgess: Junk, Doing It
- Frances Hodgson Burnett: The Secret Garden, A Little Princess, Little Lord Fauntleroy
- Niki Burnham: Royally Jacked, Sticky Fingers
- Candace Bushnell: The Carrie Diaries
- Julie Buxbaum: Tell Me Three Things, What to Say Next

== C ==
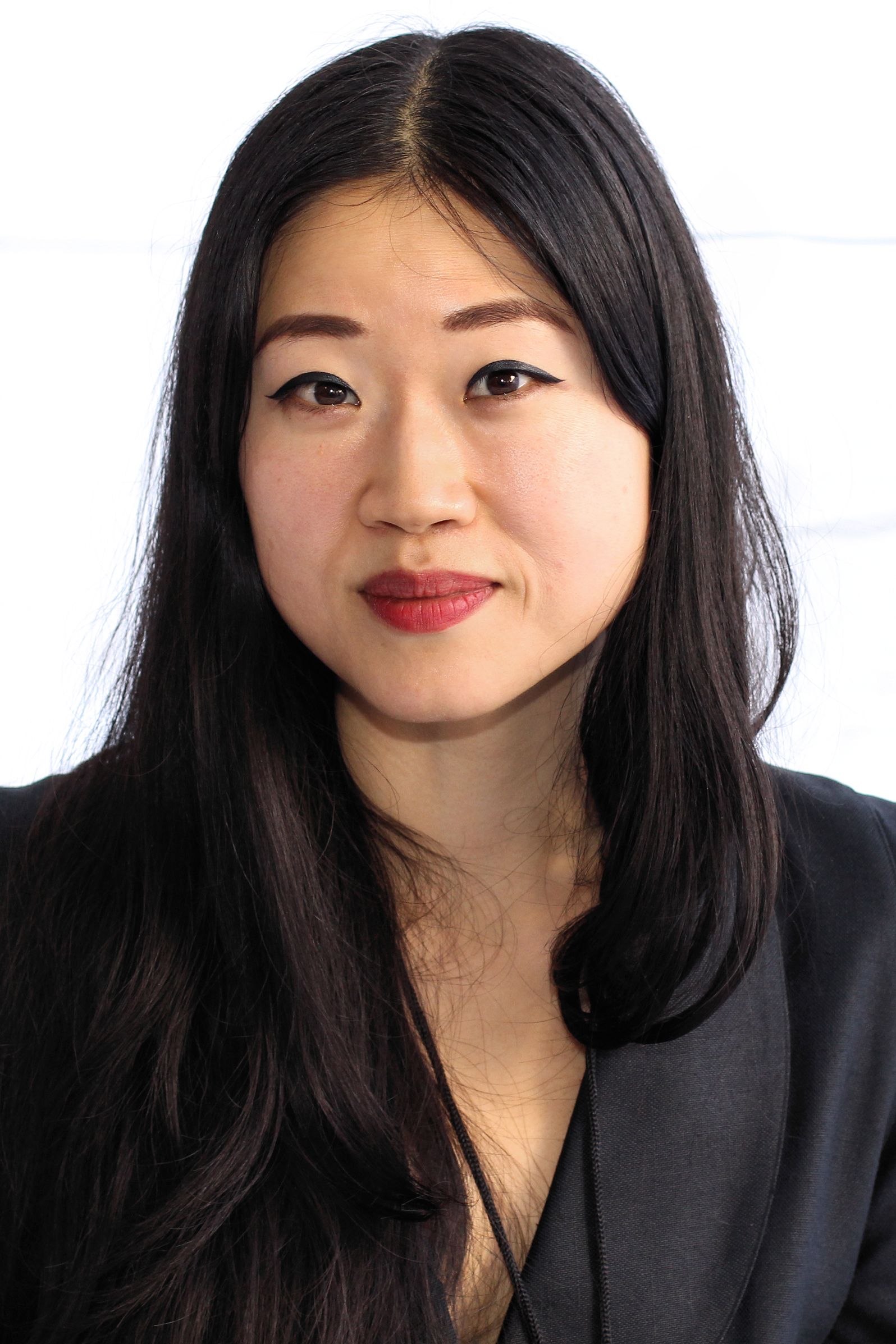
Mary H.K. Choi

- Meg Cabot: The Mediator, 1-800-Where-R-U, The Princess Diaries, All-American Girl, Jinx
- Rachel Caine: The Morganville Vampires series
- Deb Caletti: The Nature of Jade, The Secret Life of Prince Charming, The Six Rules of Maybe
- Kacen Callender: Felix Ever After
- W. Bruce Cameron: A Dog's Purpose
- Orson Scott Card: Ender's Game
- Patrick Carman: Atherton: The House of Power, Skeleton Creek, Trackers
- Isobelle Carmody: Obernewtyn Chronicles, Legendsong Saga
- Ally Carter: The Gallagher Girls, Heist Society
- Russell Gordon Carter: Three Points of Honor, The White Plume of Navarre, Patriot Lad series
- Kristin Cashore: Graceling
- Kiera Cass: The Selection series
- Cathy Cassidy: Indigo Blue, Scarlett, Gingersnaps
- Kristin Cast and P. C. Cast: House of Night series
- Cecil Castellucci: Boy Proof, The Queen of Cool, Beige, Tin Star
- Brian Caswell: A Cage of Butterflies, Only the Heart, Double Exposure
- Betty Cavanna: Going On Sixteen, A Date for Diane, Stamp Twice for Murder
- Michael Chabon: Summerland
- Soman Chainani: The School for Good and Evil series
- Aidan Chambers: Dance on My Grave, Postcards from No Man's Land
- Stephen Chbosky: The Perks of Being a Wallflower
- Traci Chee: Sea of Ink and Gold, We Are Not Free
- Alice Childress: A Hero Ain't Nothin' but a Sandwich
- Cinda Williams Chima: The Heir Chronicles, The Seven Realms
- Mary H.K. Choi: Emergency Contact, Permanent Record
- Roshani Chokshi: The Star Touched Queen series, The Gilded Wolves series
- John Christopher: Prince in Waiting trilogy, Tripods trilogy
- Lucy Christopher: Stolen
- Sandra Cisneros: The House on Mango Street
- Cassandra Clare: The Mortal Instruments, The Infernal Devices, The Dark Artifices
- Terri Clark: Breaking Up Is Hard to Do, Sleepless
- Dhonielle Clayton: The Belles
- Rosemary Clement-Moore: Texas Gothic, The Splendor Falls, Prom Dates from Hell, Hell Week, Highway to Hell
- Ernest Cline: Ready Player One
- Robbie Coburn: The Foal in the Wire
- Joseph Coelho: The Girl Who Became a Tree, The Boy Lost in the Maze
- Rachel Cohn: Gingerbread, Dash & Lily's Book of Dares
- Brock Cole: The Goats
- Chris Colfer: Stranger Than Fanfiction
- Sneed B. Collard III: Double Eagle, Cartwheel
- Christopher Collier and James Lincoln Collier: My Brother Sam Is Dead
- Suzanne Collins: The Hunger Games Trilogy
- Ying Chang Compestine: Revolution Is Not a Dinner Party
- Ally Condie: Matched, Crossed, Reached
- Ellen Conford: Dear Lovey Hart, I Am Desperate, We Interrupt This Semester for an Important Bulletin
- Pam Conrad: My Daniel
- Caroline B. Cooney: The Face on the Milk Carton, Both Sides of Time, Twenty Pageants Later, Driver's Ed
- Susan Cooper: The Dark is Rising series, King of Shadows
- Robert Cormier: The Chocolate War, After the First Death, The Bumblebee Flies Anyway, Fade, I Am the Cheese, Tenderness, We All Fall Down
- Bruce Coville: Aliens Ate My Homework, Armageddon Summer, Fortune's Journey
- John Coy: Crackback, Box Out
- Sharon Creech: Walk Two Moons, Bloomability, The Wanderer, Chasing Redbird, Absolutely Normal Chaos, Ruby Holler
- Linda Crew: Children of the River
- Sarah Crossan: One, Apple and Rain, The Weight of Water
- Cath Crowley: Words in Deep Blue
- Chris Crutcher: Ironman, Staying Fat for Sarah Byrnes, Whale Talk, The Sledding Hill
- Mike Curato: Flamer
- Jane Louise Curry: The Watchers, A Stolen Life, The Black Canary
- Christopher Paul Curtis: The Watsons Go to Birmingham – 1963, Bud, Not Buddy
- Karen Cushman: Catherine, Called Birdy
- Leah Cypess: Death Sworn, Mistwood

== D ==
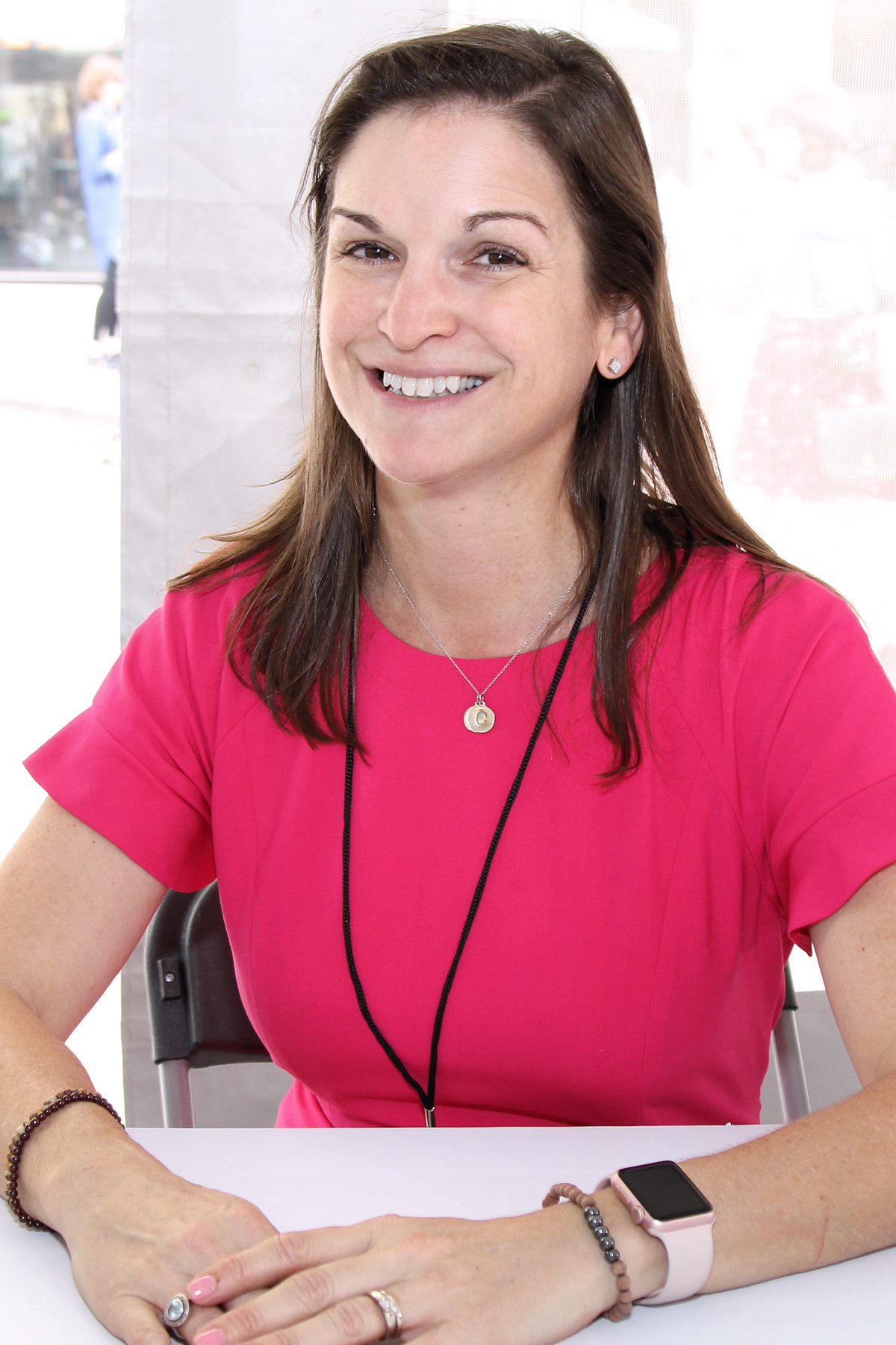
Sarah Dessen

- Anita Daher: Spider's Song, Two Foot Punch, Forgetting How to Breathe
- Roald Dahl: The Wonderful Story of Henry Sugar and Six More, The Great Automatic Grammatizator
- Maria Dahvana Headley: Magonia
- Linden Dalecki: Kid B
- Maureen Daly: Seventeenth Summer
- Emily Danforth: The Miseducation of Cameron Post
- Paula Danziger: The Cat Ate My Gymsuit, The Divorce Express
- James Dashner: The Maze Runner series
- Terry Davis: Vision Quest, Mysterious Ways, If Rock & Roll Were a Machine
- Pieretta Dawn: The Mermaid Apprentices, The Nymph Treasury
- Pamela Dean: Tam Lin, The Secret Country trilogy, The Dubious Hills
- Zoey Dean: The A-List series
- Melissa de la Cruz: Blue Bloods
- Tracy Deonn: Legendborn
- Sarah Dessen: Dreamland, Keeping the Moon, The Truth About Forever, Lock and Key
- Carl Deuker: Heart of a Champion, Runner, Gym Candy
- Graham Diamond: The Thief of Kalimar, Lady of the Haven
- Peter Dickinson: The Dancing Bear, Tulku, Eva, AK, The Ropemaker
- Berlie Doherty: Dear Nobody, The Snake-Stone, Granny Was a Buffer Girl
- Tom Dolby: The Sixth Form
- Jennifer Donnelly: A Northern Light, Revolution
- Siobhan Dowd: A Swift Pure Cry, Bog Child
- Ann Downer: The Spellkey, The Glass Salamander, The Books of the Keepers
- Jenny Downham: Before I Die
- Sharon Draper: Tears of a Tiger, The Battle of Jericho, Copper Sun, Romiette and Julio
- Diane Duane: Young Wizards series
- Tessa Duder: Alex Quartet
- Rosamond du Jardin: Practically Seventeen, Double Date, Wait for Marcy
- Lois Duncan: I Know What You Did Last Summer, Killing Mr. Griffin, Summer of Fear
- Jeanne DuPrau: The City of Ember

== E ==
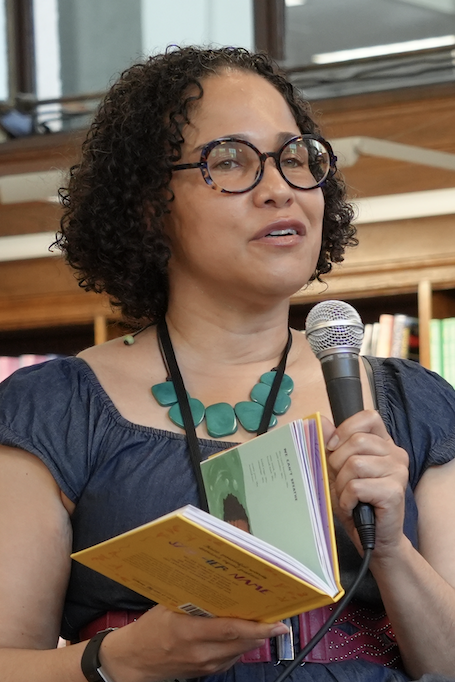
Zetta Elliott

- Jennifer Echols: Forget You, Going Too Far, Love Story, The Boys Next Door, Endless Summer, The One That I Want, Such A Rush
- Sara Bergmark Elfgren: Engelsfors
- Simone Elkeles: Perfect Chemistry, Rules of Attraction, Chain Reaction
- Zetta Elliott: A Wish After Midnight, Ship of Souls, Mother of the Sea
- Anne Emery: Dinny Gordon series, The Popular Crowd
- Akwaeke Emezi: Pet
- Sylvia Engdahl: Enchantress from the Stars, This Star Shall Abide

== F ==
- Nancy Yi Fan: Swordbird
- Hafsah Faizal: We Hunt the Flame
- Sara Farizan: If You Could Be Mine
- Nancy Farmer: The Ear, the Eye and the Arm, The House of the Scorpion, The Sea of Trolls
- Tim Federle: The Great American Whatever
- Catherine Fisher: The Book of the Crow, The Oracle Prophecies Trilogy, Darkhenge, Corbenic, Incarceron
- Becca Fitzpatrick: Hush, Hush, Crescendo, Silence
- Jasper Fforde: The Last Dragonslayer
- Sharon G. Flake: The Skin I'm In, Money Hungry
- Paul Fleischman: Whirligig, A Fate Totally Worse than Death
- Alex Flinn: Breathing Underwater, Beastly, Cloaked
- Jaroslav Foglar: Přístav volá, Rychlé šípy
- Timothée de Fombelle: Toby Alone, Vango
- Dennis Foon: The Longlight Legacy, Double or Nothing
- Lani Forbes: Age of the Seventh Sun
- Antonia Forest: Peter's Room, Thuggery Affair, The Attic Term
- Gayle Forman: If I Stay, Where She Went, Just One Day, I Was Here
- Paula Fox: One-Eyed Cat, The Slave Dancer
- E.R. Frank: Life Is Funny, America, Wrecked, Friction
- Mariah Fredericks: In the Cards: Love, Crunch Time, The True Meaning of Cleavage, Head Games, The Smart Girl's Guide to Tarot, Fatal Distraction
- Benedict and Nancy Freedman: Mrs. Mike
- Russell Freedman: Lincoln: A Photobiography, The Life and Death of Crazy Horse, Eleanor Roosevelt: A Life Discovered
- Barbara C. Freeman: The Other Face, A Haunting Air, Snow in the Maze
- Mark Frost: The Paladin Prophecy
- Cornelia Funke: Inkheart, The Thief Lord, Dragon Rider

== G ==
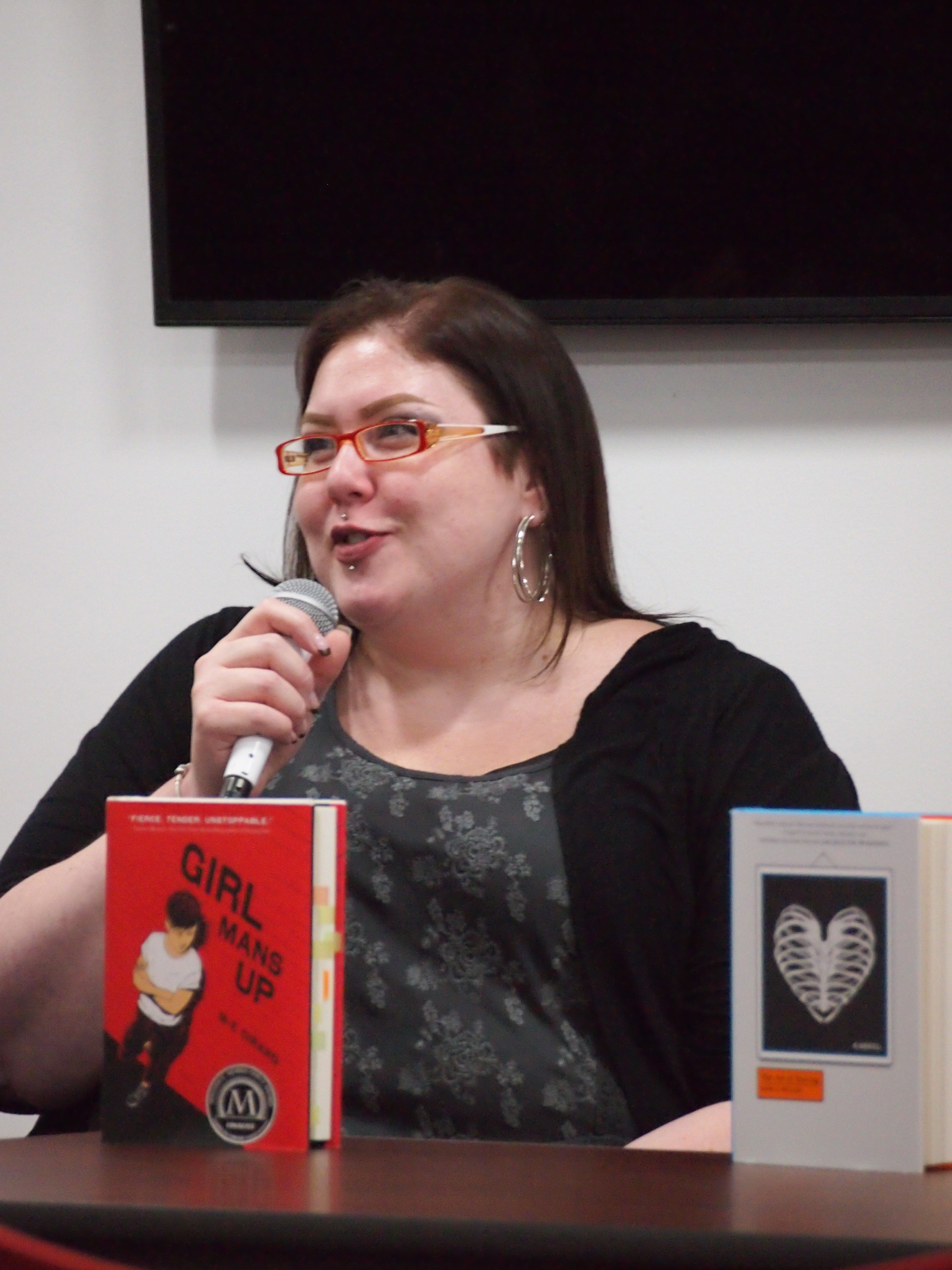
M-E Girard

- Jostein Gaarder: Sophie's World, The Orange Girl
- Claudia Gabel: In or Out series, Romeo and Juliet and Vampires
- Neil Gaiman: Coraline, The Graveyard Book
- Eric Gansworth: Apple (Skin to the Core)
- Jack Gantos: Joey Pigza series, Hole in My Life (autobiography of his youth)
- Stephanie Garber: Caraval series
- Kami Garcia: Beautiful Creatures
- Nancy Garden: Annie on My Mind, The Year They Burned the Books
- Sally Gardner: I, Coriander, Maggot Moon
- Alan Garner: The Weirdstone of Brisingamen, Elidor, The Owl Service, Red Shift
- Jean Craighead George: Julie of the Wolves, My Side of the Mountain, Julie
- Adèle Geras: Troy, Happy Ever After, Silent Snow, Secret Snow
- Gail Giles: Shattering Glass
- M-E Girard: Girl Mans Up
- Morris Gleitzman: Two Weeks with the Queen, Worry Warts, Puppy Fat
- Anna Godbersen: Luxe series: The Luxe, Rumors, Envy, Splendor
- Parke Godwin: The Tower of Beowulf
- Glenda Goertzen: Lady Oak Abroad
- William Golding: Lord of the Flies
- Chloe Gong: These Violent Delights
- Michael Grant: Gone
- Claudia Gray: Firebird series, Spellcaster series, Evernight series
- John Green: Looking for Alaska, An Abundance of Katherines, Paper Towns, The Fault in Our Stars, Will Grayson, Will Grayson, Turtles All the Way Down
- Bette Greene: Summer of My German Soldier
- Robert Joseph Greene: This High School Has Closets
- Adele Griffin: The Unfinished Life of Addison Stone, Loud Awake & Lost
- John Grisham: Theodore Boone series
- Robin Jones Gunn: Christy Miller series, Sierra Jensen series
- Rosa Guy: The Friends, The Disappearance

== H ==
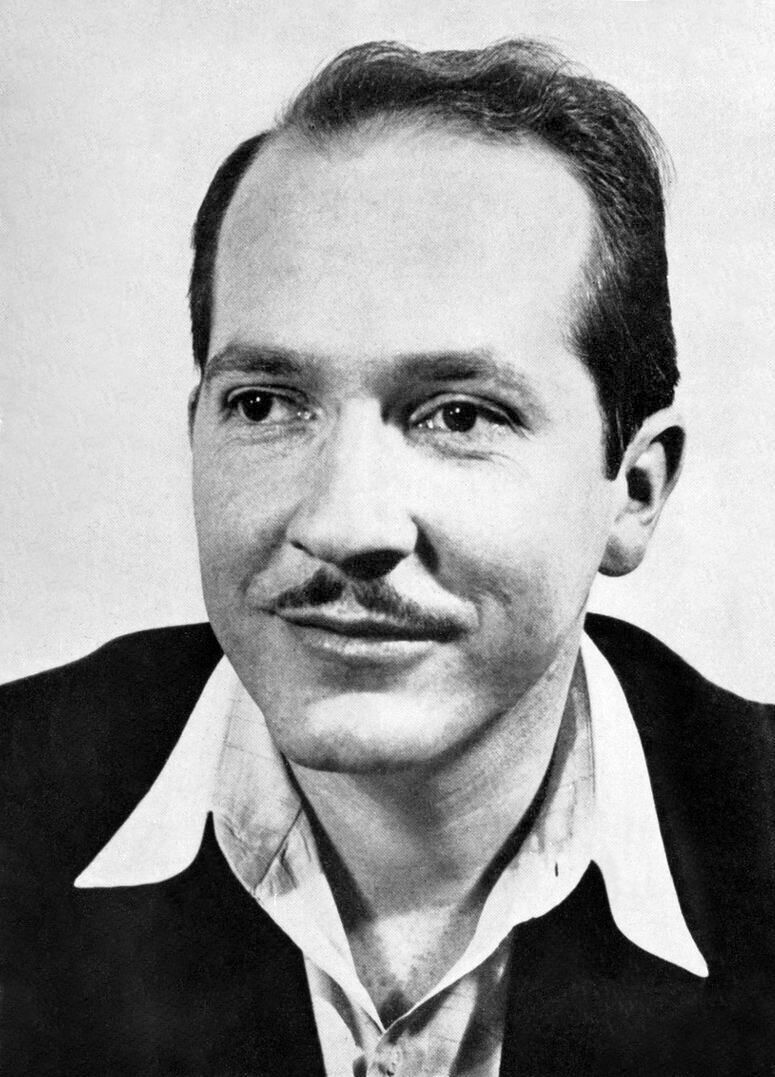
Robert A. Heinlein

- Robin Ha: Almost American Girl
- PJ Haarsma: The Softwire series
- Margaret Peterson Haddix: Among the Hidden, Found
- Mark Haddon: The Curious Incident of the Dog in the Night-Time
- Shannon Hale: The Books of Bayern series, Princess Academy
- Alex Hall: Ben Drowned series
- Barbara Hall: Dixie Storms, House across the Cove, Tempo Change
- Laurell K. Hamilton: Anita Blake, Vampire Hunter, Meredith Gentry series
- Jenny Han: The Summer I Turned Pretty, To All the Boys I've Loved Before
- Victoria Hanley: Seer and the Sword series
- Lisi Harrison: The Clique, Monster High
- Alix E. Harrow: The Ten Thousand Doors of January, The Once and Future Witches
- Brent Hartinger: Geography Club
- Rachel Hartman: Seraphina, Tess of the Road
- Sonya Hartnett: Sleeping Dogs, Thursday's Child, Surrender
- James Haskins (primarily an author of non-fiction): Fighting Shirley Chisholm, The Geography of Hope
- Pete Hautman: Godless, Invisible
- Louise Hawes: The Vanishing Point, Waiting for Christopher, Rosey in the Present Tense
- Rachel Hawkins: Hex Hall series, Rebel Belle trilogy
- Lian Hearn: Across the Nightingale Floor
- Robert A. Heinlein (primarily an author of science fiction): Red Planet, Farmer in the Sky
- Claire Hennessy: Dear Diary
- Nat Hentoff (primarily an author of adult non-fiction): Does This School Have Capital Punishment?
- Karen Hesse: Out of the Dust, Witness (novels in verse)
- Carl Hiaasen: Hoot, Flush, Scat
- Brenda Hiatt: Starstruck
- Charlie Higson: Young Bond
- S.E. Hinton: The Outsiders, Rumble Fish, Tex, That Was Then, This Is Now
- Will Hobbs: Downriver, Far North, Crossing the Wire
- Amanda Hocking: My Blood Approves Series, Switched Trilogy
- Alice Hoffman: Green Angel
- Nina Kiriki Hoffman (primarily an author of science fiction): A Stir of Bones, Spirits That Walk in Shadow
- Linda Holeman: Promise Song, Mercy's Birds, Raspberry House Blues
- Jennifer Holm: Our Only May Amelia, Boston Jane
- Cathy Hopkins: Mates, Dates series, Cinnamon Girl series
- Ellen Hopkins: Crank
- Anthony Horowitz: The Power of Five series, The Diamond Brothers, Alex Rider
- Erin Hunter: Warriors series, New Prophecy series, The Power of Three
- Mollie Hunter: The Stronghold, A Stranger Came Ashore, Cat, Herself
- Zora Neale Hurston: Their Eyes Were Watching God
- William Hussey: Hideous Beauty, The Outrage, The Boy I Love
- Liz Hyder: Bearmouth, The Twelve

== I ==
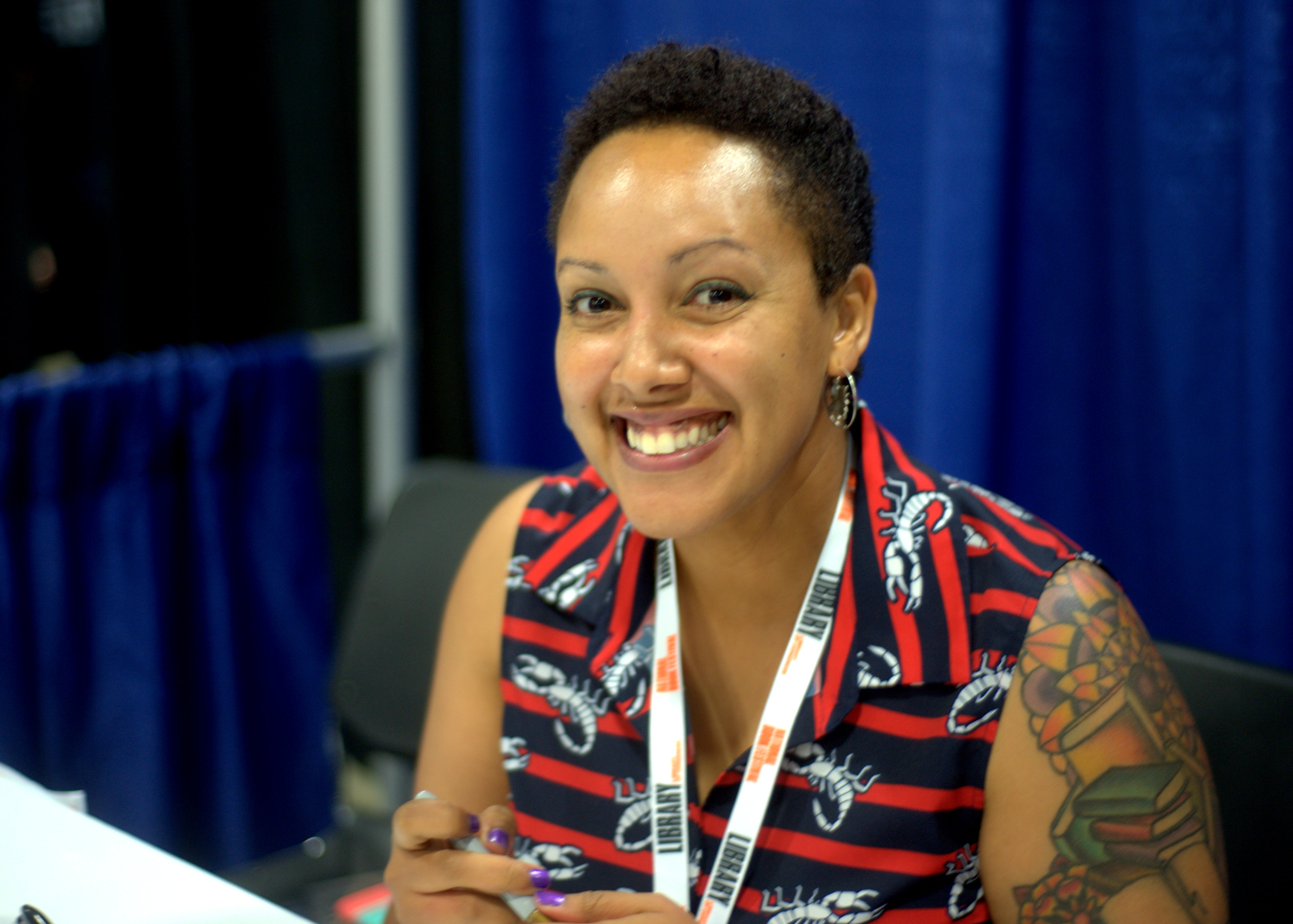
Justina Ireland

- Jordan Ifueko: Raybearer
- Wendy Isdell: A Gebra Named Al, The Chemy Called Al
- Justina Ireland: Dread Nation, Deathless Divide

== J ==
- Holly Jackson: Good Girl's Guide to Murder series
- Tiffany D. Jackson: Allegedly, Monday's Not Coming, Grown, The Weight of Blood
- Brian Jacques: Redwall series
- Adiba Jaigirdar: The Henna Wars
- A. M. Jenkins: Damage, Repossessed, Night Road
- Alaya Dawn Johnson: Love Is the Drug, The Summer Prince
- Angela Johnson: Toning the Sweep, Heaven, The First Part Last
- Catherine Johnson: Sawbones, The Curious Tale of the Lady Caraboo
- George Matthew Johnson: All Boys Aren't Blue
- Leah Johnson: You Should See Me in a Crown
- Maureen Johnson: 13 Little Blue Envelopes, The Name of the Star, Truly Devious
- E. K. Johnston: Ashoka, A Thousand Nights
- Carrie Jones: Need, Captivate, Entice
- Diana Wynne Jones: Chrestomanci series, Dalemark Quartet, Fire and Hemlock, Power of Three, Dark Lord of Derkholm, Year of the Griffin, Deep Secret, The Merlin Conspiracy, Howl's Moving Castle, Castle in the Air, House of Many Ways
- Graham Joyce: TWOC, Do the Creepy Thing, Three Ways to Snog an Alien

== K ==
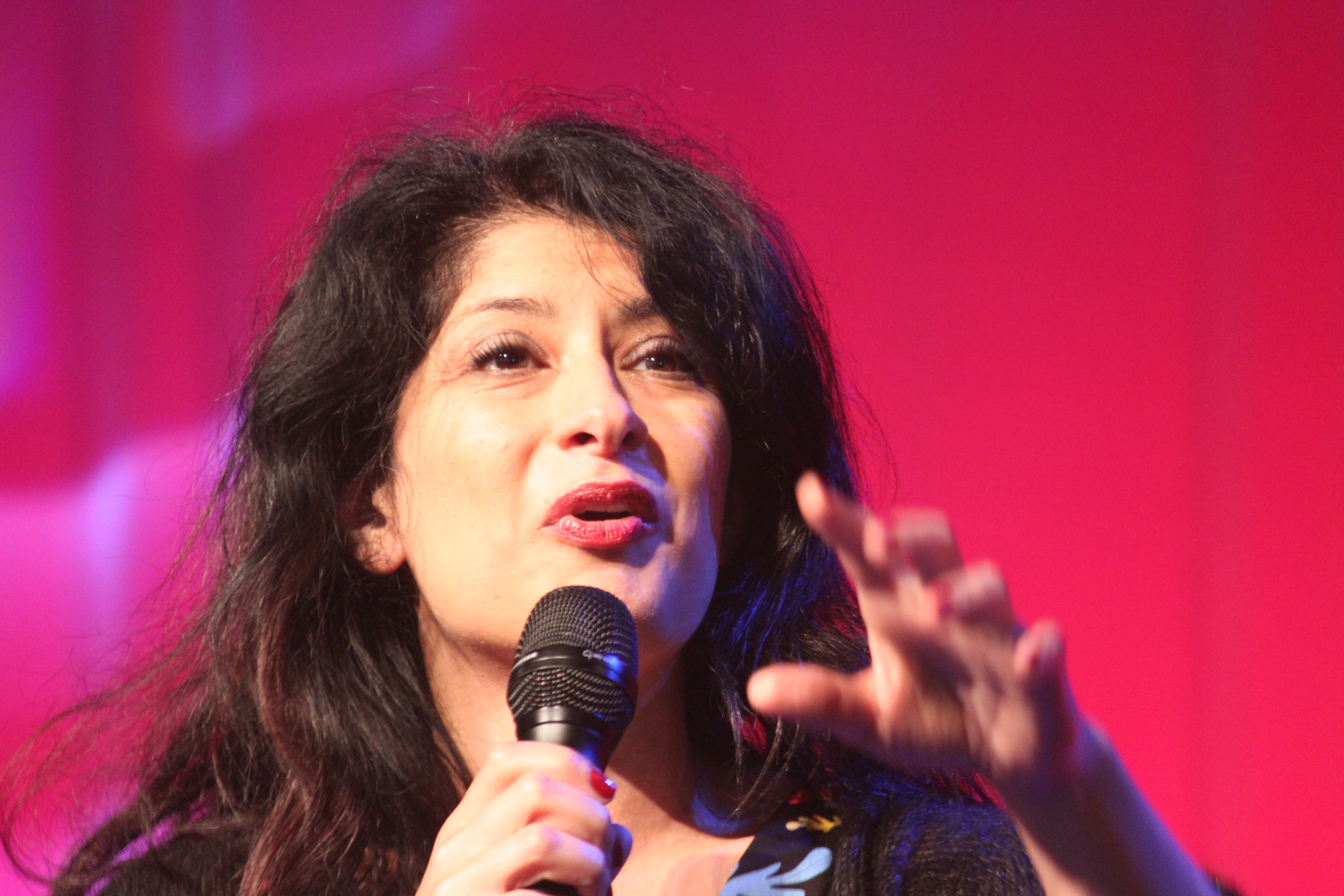
Shaparak Khorsandi

- Stacey Kade: The Ghost and the Goth
- Julie Kagawa: Iron Fey series, Blood of Eden series
- Lauren Kate: Fallen, Torment, Passion
- Amie Kaufman: Illuminae Files series, Starbound trilogy
- Marilyn Kaye: Gifted series
- Brian Keaney: Jacob's Ladder, The Haunting of Nathaniel Wolfe, The Private Life of Georgia Brown
- Harold Keith: Rifles for Watie
- Kody Keplinger: The DUFF
- M. E. Kerr: Dinky Hocker Shoots Smack, Little Little, Night Kites, Deliver Us from Evie, Fell, Gentlehands
- Alexander Key: The Incredible Tide
- Mahmona Khan: Skitten Snø, Fra Oslo til Lahore, Når du minst venter det
- Shaparak Khorsandi: Kissing Emma
- Jessica Khoury: Origin, The Forbidden Wish
- Celine Kiernan: The Poison Throne, Into the Grey
- Patrice Kindl: Owl in Love, Goose Chase
- A. S. King: Please Ignore Vera Dietz, Ask the Passengers
- David Klass: Danger Zone, You Don't Know Me
- Annette Curtis Klause: The Silver Kiss, Blood and Chocolate
- Norma Klein: It's Okay If You Don't Love Me, Family Secrets, Just Friends
- TJ Klune: The Extraordinaries
- Elizabeth Knox: Dreamhunter, Dreamquake, Mortal Fire
- Ron Koertge: The Arizona Kid
- E. L. Konigsburg: Silent to the Bone, The Outcasts of 19 Schuyler Place, The Mysterious Edge of the Heroic World
- Alethea Kontis: Woodcutter Sisters series
- Gordon Korman: Macdonald Hall series, Island series, Jake, Reinvented, No More Dead Dogs, The 39 Clues: One False Note & The Emperor's Code
- Jay Kristoff: Illuminae Files series, Lifel1k3
- Naomi Kritzer: Catfishing on CatNet
- Alice Kuipers: Life on the Refrigerator Door, The Worst Thing She Ever Did, 40 Things I Want To Tell You

== L ==
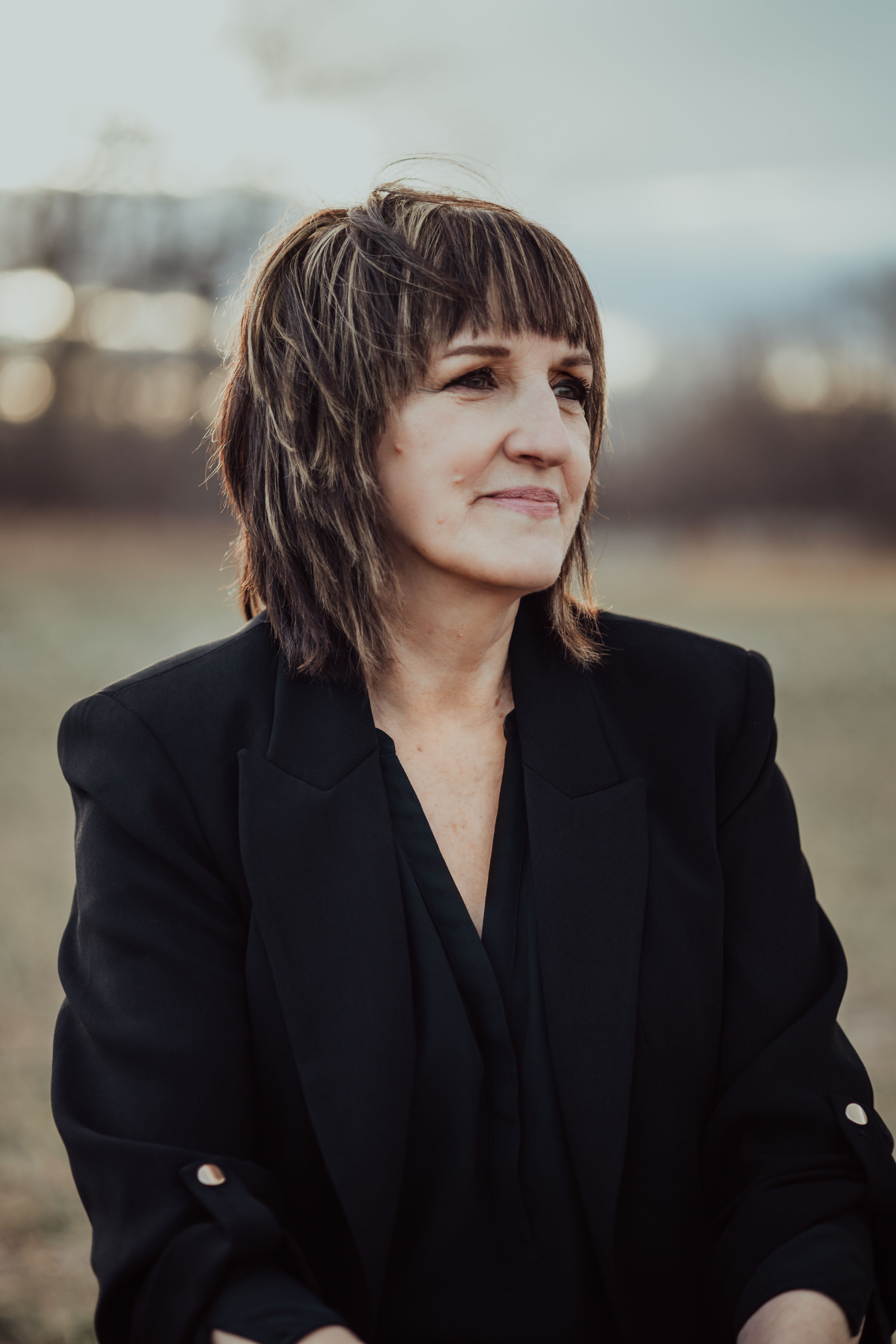
Martine Leavitt

- Nina LaCour: Hold Still, Everything Leads to You, We Are Okay, Watch Over Me
- Elizabeth Laird: Red Sky in the Morning, Jake's Tower, A Little Piece of Ground
- Janet Lambert: Star Spangled Summer, Introducing Parri
- Derek Landy: Skulduggery Pleasant
- Lori Lansens: The Girls: A Novel
- Justine Larbalestier: Magic or Madness, How to Ditch Your Fairy, Liar
- Kathryn Lasky: Blood Secret, Beyond the Burning Time, True North
- Iain Lawrence: Lord of the Nutcracker Men
- Michael Lawrence: Aldous Lexicon or Withern Rise trilogy
- Patrice Lawrence: Orangeboy, Indigo Donut, Eight Pieces of Silva, Needle
- Ursula K. Le Guin: A Wizard of Earthsea, Very Far Away from Anywhere Else
- Madeleine L'Engle: The Time Quartet, Polly O'Keefe series, Austin family series
- Martine Leavitt: My Book of Life by Angel, Keturah and Lord Death, Calvin
- Mackenzi Lee: The Gentleman's Guide to Vice and Virtue
- Tanith Lee: The Castle of Dark, The Claidi Journals, Piratica
- Peter Lerangis: Seven Wonders series
- Billie Letts: Where The Heart Is
- Gail Carson Levine: The Wish, Ella Enchanted, Fairest, Dave at Night, The Two Princesses of Bamarre
- David Levithan: Boy Meets Boy, The Realm of Possibility, Every Day, Will Grayson, Will Grayson
- Robert Lipsyte: The Contender, The Brave, The Chief, One Fat Summer
- Malinda Lo: Ash, Last Night at the Telegraph Club
- E. Lockhart: We Were Liars, The Boyfriend List, The Disreputable History of Frankie Landau-Banks,
- Ruth Frances Long: The Treachery of Beautiful Things, A Crack in Everything
- Maud Lovelace: Heaven to Betsy, Betsy and the Great World
- Lois Lowry: The Giver, The Silent Boy, Number the Stars, Gathering Blue
- Marie Lu: Legend, Prodigy, Champion, Warcross
- Barry Lyga: The Astonishing Adventures of Fanboy and Goth Girl, Boy Toy
- Frances Lynn: Crushed

== M ==
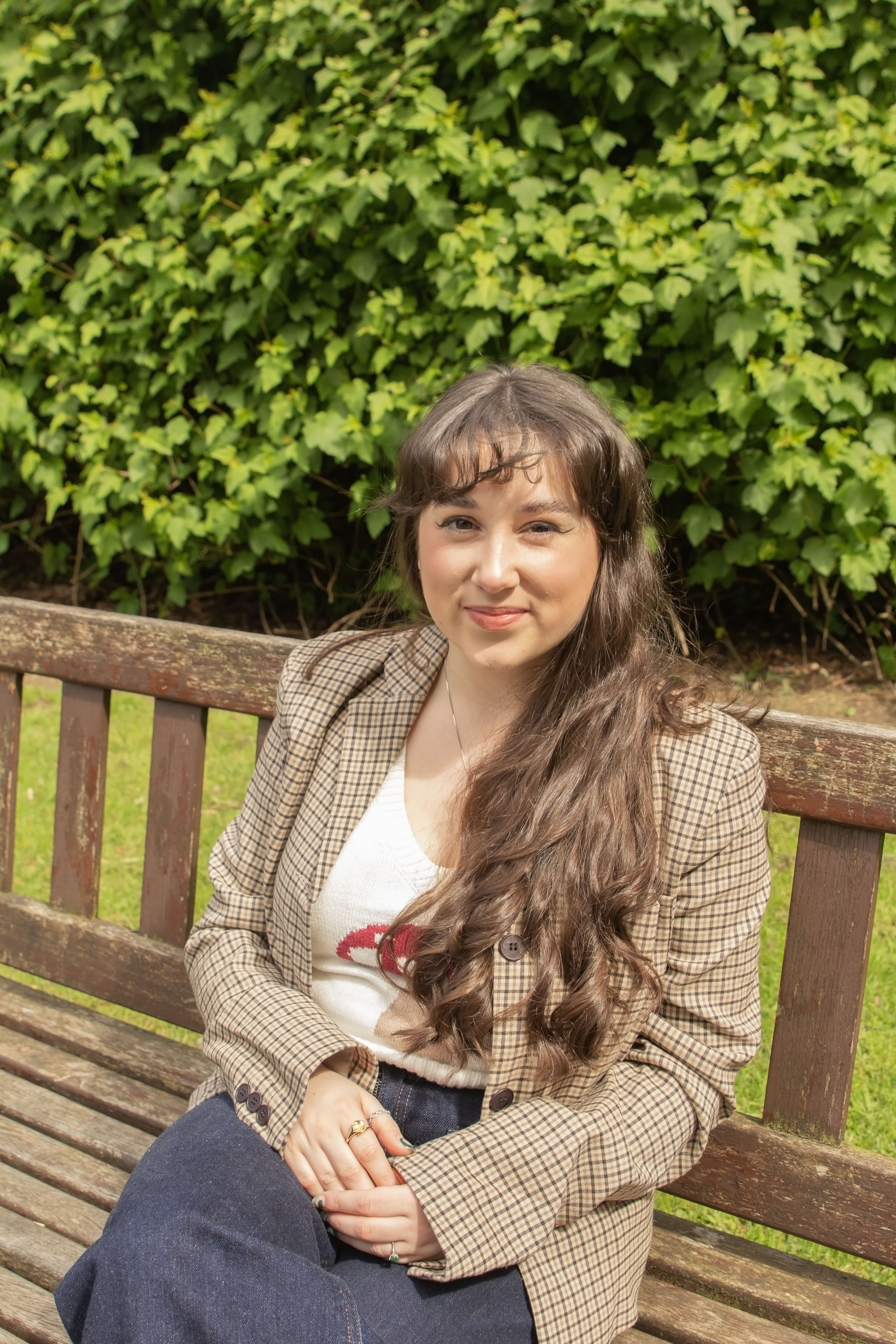
Margaret McDonald

- Sarah J. Maas: Throne of Glass, A Court of Thorns and Roses
- Carolyn Mackler: The Earth, My Butt, and Other Big Round Things, Vegan Virgin Valentine, Love and Other Four Letter Words
- Tahereh Mafi: Shatter Me series
- Kekla Magoon: How it Went Down, X
- Michelle Magorian: A Little Love Song
- Adeline Yen Mah: Falling Leaves: The Memoirs of A Unwanted Chinese Daughter, Chinese Cinderella, Chinese Cinderella and the Secret Dragon Society
- Shelby Mahurin: Serpent & Dove series
- Margaret Mahy: Alchemy, The Changeover
- Sarra Manning: Let's Get Lost, Fashionistas series, Diary of a Crush series, Pretty Things, Guitar Girl
- Keith Mansfield: Johnny Mackintosh series
- Melina Marchetta: Looking for Alibrandi, Saving Francesca, On the Jellicoe Road, Finnikin of the Rock
- Jan Mark: The Eclipse of the Century, Useful Idiots, Riding Tycho, Voyager
- Melissa Marr: Wicked Lovely, Ink Exchange, Fragile Eternity
- John Marsden: Tomorrow series
- Ann M. Martin: California Diaries, A Corner of the Universe, Missing Since Monday
- Bobbie Ann Mason: In Country
- Syed M. Masood: The Bad Muslim Discount, More Than Just a Pretty Face
- Sue Mayfield: Drowning Anna
- Norma Fox Mazer and Harry Mazer: Heartbeat
- Megan McCafferty: Jessica Darling series, Bumped, Thumped
- Anne McCaffrey: Dragonriders of Pern, The Ship Who Sang, Dinosaur Planet
- Norah McClintock: The Mike & Riel series, The Robyn Hunter series, The Chloe & Levesque series
- Patricia McCormick: Cut, My Brother's Keeper
- Lurlene McDaniel: One Last Wish, Hit and Run, Don't Die, My Love, Till Death Do Us Part
- Margaret McDonald: Glasgow Boys
- Mindy McGinnis: Be Not Far from Me, Heroine, The Female of the Species
- Anthony McGowan: The Knife That Killed Me, Hello Darkness, The Truth of Things series
- Seanan McGuire: Every Heart a Doorway
- Sharon E. McKay: Charlie Wilcox, War Brothers, Prison Boy
- Robin McKinley: Beauty, The Hero and the Crown, Spindle's End, Rose Daughter
- Anna-Marie McLemore: When the Moon Was Ours, Wild Beauty
- Lisa McMann: Wake, Fade, Gone
- Karen M. McManus: One of Us Is Lying
- Richelle Mead: Vampire Academy series, Bloodlines, The Golden Lily
- Stephen W. Meader: Bulldozer, Commodore's Cup, T Model Tommy
- Meg Medina: Burn Baby Burn, Milagros: Girl from Away, Yaqui Delgado Wants to Kick Your Ass
- O. R. Melling: The Hunter's Moon
- Milton Meltzer (primarily an author of nonfiction): Underground Man
- Sandhya Menon: When Dimple Met Rishi
- Melinda Metz: Roswell High, Fingerprints
- Marissa Meyer: The Lunar Chronicles, Renegades
- Stephenie Meyer: Twilight, New Moon, Eclipse, Breaking Dawn, The Short Second Life of Bree Tanner, The Host, Life and Death
- Ben Mikaelsen: Petey, Touching Spirit Bear
- Gloria D. Miklowitz: After the Bomb
- Sarah Mlynowski: Bras and Broomsticks
- Nils Mohl: Es war einmal Indianerland, Henny & Ponger
- James Moloney: The Book of Lies, Master of the Books
- Patrick Moore: Scott Saunders Space Adventure series
- Perry Moore: Hero
- Kass Morgan: The 100
- Jaclyn Moriarty: The Year of Secret Assignments, Feeling Sorry for Celia, The Murder of Bindy Mackenzie
- Jess Mowry: Way Past Cool, Babylon Boyz
- Robert Muchamore: CHERUB series
- Brandon Mull: Fablehaven series, Beyonders series, The Candy Shop War, The Arcade Catastrophe, Pingo
- Mike Mullin: Ashfall
- Julie Murphy: Side Effects May Vary, Dumplin', Puddin'
- Walter Dean Myers: Fallen Angels, Hoops, Monster, The Mouse Rap, Outside Shot, Scorpions, Slam, Bad Boy (autobiography of his youth), Malcolm X: By Any Means Necessary
- Lauren Myracle: ttyl, ttfn, l8r, g8r, Rhymes with Witches

== N ==
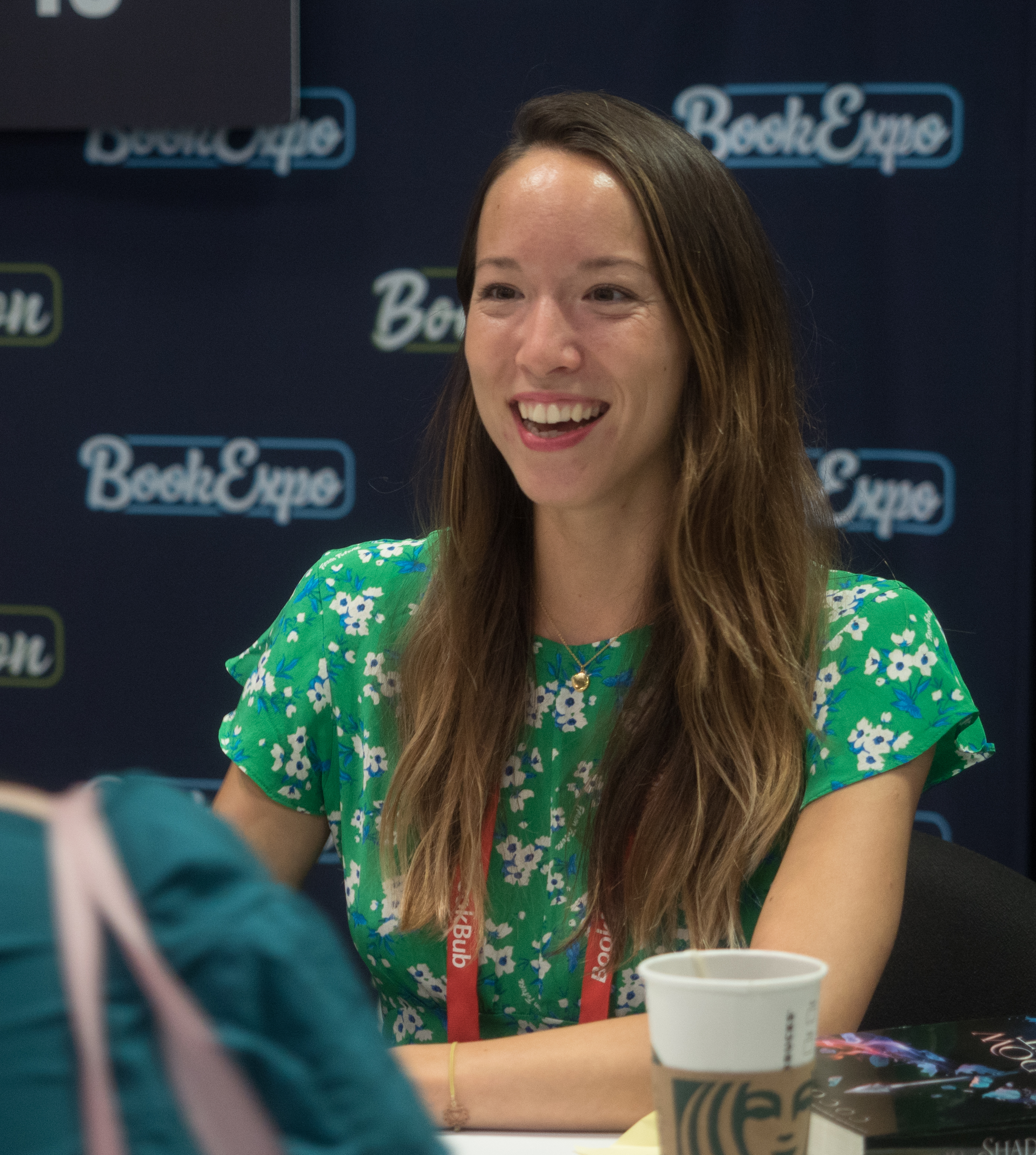
Natasha Ngan

- Beverley Naidoo: Chain of Fire, No Turning Back, Web of Lies
- Donna Jo Napoli: Daughter of Venice, Bound, Sirena
- Phyllis Reynolds Naylor: Ice, Shiloh, Alice series
- Blake Nelson: Paranoid Park, Recovery Road
- Jandy Nelson: The Sky Is Everywhere, I'll Give You the Sun
- Patrick Ness: More Than This, Chaos Walking
- Trung Le Nguyen: The Magic Fish
- William Nicholson: Wind on Fire trilogy
- Susin Nielsen: The Reluctant Journal of Henry K. Larsen, We Are All Made of Molecules, No Fixed Address
- Jennifer Niven: All the Bright Places
- Garth Nix: The Old Kingdom series, The Seventh Tower
- Joan Lowery Nixon: The Other Side of Dark, The Name of the Game Was Murder, The Haunting
- Andre Norton (primarily an author of science fiction): The Stars Are Ours!, Star Gate, The Beast Master
- Naomi Novik: Scholomance trilogy

== O ==
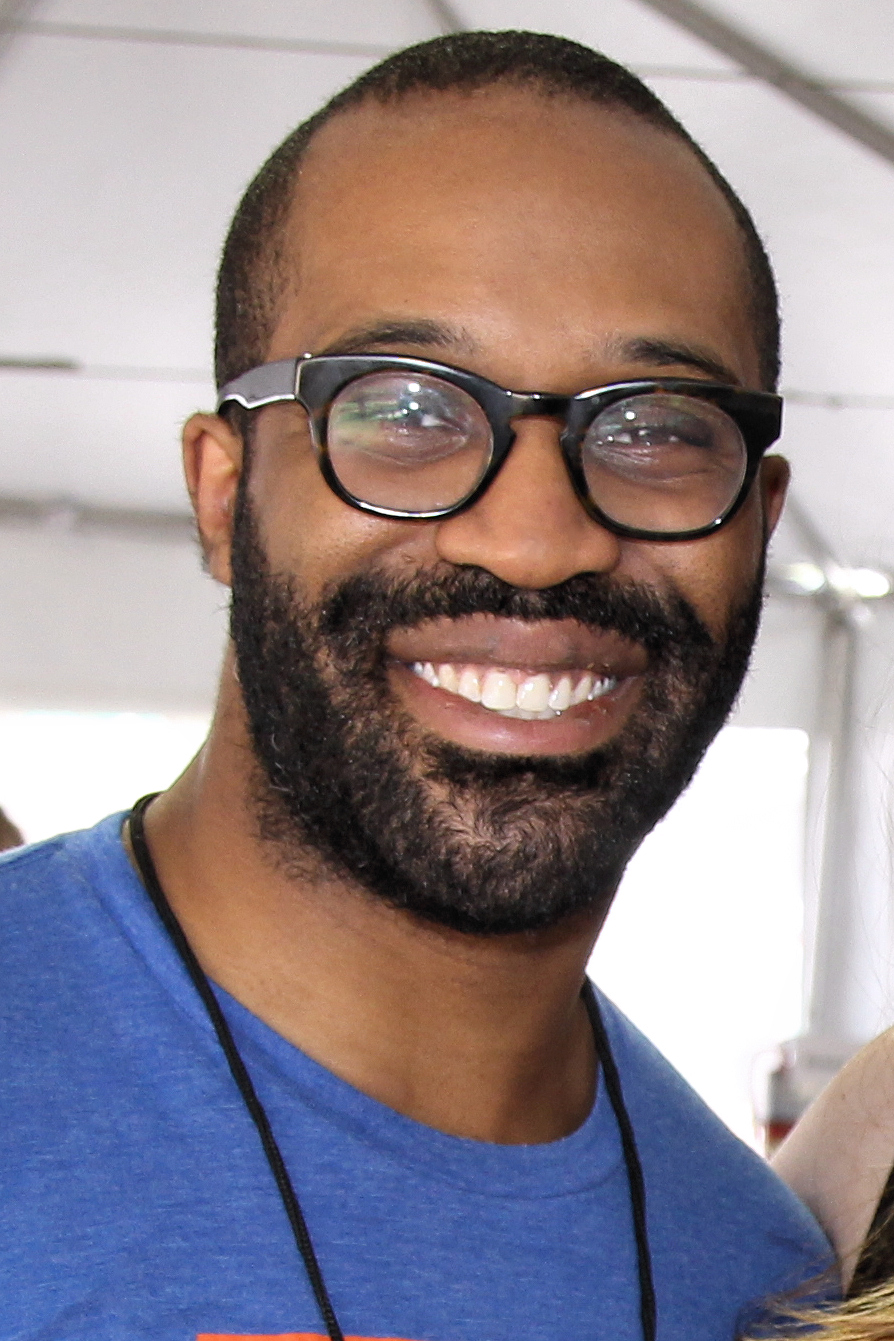
Tochi Onyebuchi

- Joyce Carol Oates: Big Mouth & Ugly Girl, Sexy
- Tyne O'Connell: The Calypso Chronicles, True Love
- Patrick O'Connor: The Black Tiger, Mexican Road Race, The Society of Foxes
- Scott O'Dell: Island of the Blue Dolphins
- Nnedi Okorafor: Zahrah the Windseeker, Akata Witch
- Daniel José Older: Shadowshaper
- Lauren Oliver: Delirium, Before I Fall, Panic, Vanishing Girls, Replica
- Louise O'Neill: Only Ever Yours, Asking For It
- Tochi Onyebuchi: War Girls
- Alice Oseman: Solitaire, Radio Silence, Heartstopper, Loveless

== P ==
- Christopher Paolini: Inheritance Cycle
- Emily X.R. Pan: The Astonishing Color of After
- Kevin Panetta: Bloom
- Linda Sue Park: A Single Shard, When My Name Was Keoko, The 39 Clues: Storm Warning
- Francine Pascal: Sweet Valley High, Fearless series, The Ruling Class
- Sonia Patel: Rani Patel in Full Effect, Jaya and Rasa: A Love Story, Bloody Seoul
- Katherine Paterson: Jacob Have I Loved, Lyddie
- James Patterson: Maximum Ride series, Witch and Wizard series, Daniel X series
- Gary Paulsen: Brian's Saga, Canyons, Nightjohn, Sarny, Soldier's Heart, Dogsong
- Jackson Pearce: As You Wish, Sisters Red
- Mary E. Pearson: A Room on Lorelei Street, The Adoration of Jenna Fox
- Richard Peck: A Long Way from Chicago, Princess Ashley, A Year Down Yonder
- Robert Newton Peck: Clunie, A Day No Pigs Would Die, Extra Innings
- Mal Peet: The Penalty, Keeper, Exposure, Tamar
- Matt de la Peña: Mexican WhiteBoy, We Were Here
- Anna Perera: Guantanamo Boy, The Glass Collector
- Stephanie Perkins: Anna and the French Kiss
- Julie Anne Peters: Keeping You a Secret, Luna, Define Normal
- Stefan Petrucha: TimeTripper, Ripper, Teen, Inc., The Rule of Won
- Stella Pevsner: And You Give Me a Pain, Elaine, Cute is a Four-Letter Word
- K. M. Peyton: Flambards, The Right-Hand Man, Pennington's Seventeenth Summer
- Susan Beth Pfeffer: Life as We Knew It, The Dead and the Gone
- James Phelan: The Last Thirteen, Alone
- Rodman Philbrick: Freak the Mighty, The Fire Pony
- Ben Philippe: The Field Guide to the North American Teenager
- Joan Phipson: Dinko, A Tide Flowing, The Watcher in the Garden, Bianca
- Jodi Picoult: Between the Lines, My Sister's Keeper
- Meredith Ann Pierce: The Darkangel trilogy, The Firebringer trilogy
- Tamora Pierce: The Song of the Lioness, The Immortals, Protector of the Small, Trickster's Choice, Trickster's Queen, Provost's Dog, Circle of Magic, The Circle Opens
- Aprilynne Pike: Wings
- Christopher Pike: Chain Letter, Remember Me, Alosha
- Christine Pillainayagam: Ellie Pillai Is Brown
- Daniel Pinkwater: The Snarkout Boys and the Avocado of Death
- Elizabeth Marie Pope: The Sherwood Ring, The Perilous Gard
- Connie Porter: Imani All Mine
- Terry Pratchett: Tiffany Aching series
- Susan Price: The Sterkarm Handshake, A Sterkarm Kiss, Odin's Voice, Odin's Queen
- Francine Prose (primarily an author of adult fiction): After
- Anne Provoost: Falling, My Aunt is a Pilot Whale, In the Shadow of the Ark
- Philip Pullman: Sally Lockhart series, His Dark Materials trilogy

== Q ==
- Matthew Quick: Sorta Like a Rockstar, Boy21, Forgive Me, Leonard Peacock, Every Exquisite Thing
- Dawn Quigley: Apple in the Middle, Jo Jo Makoons

== R ==
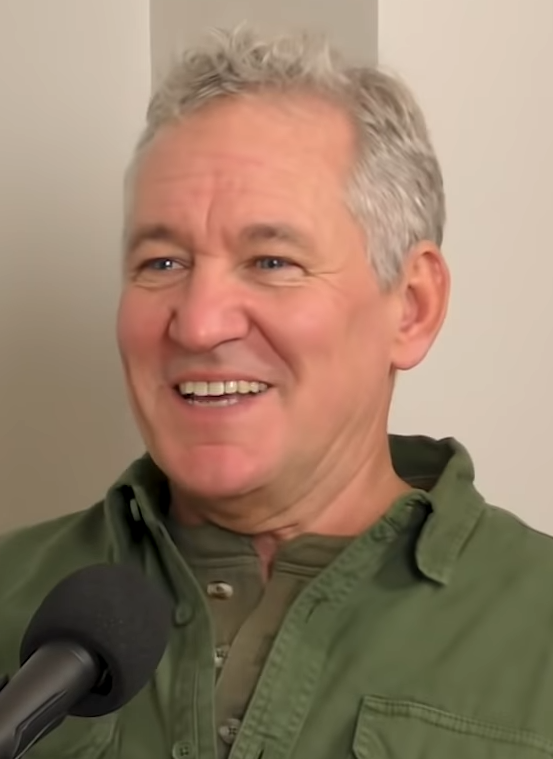
Chris Ryan

- Bali Rai: (Un)arranged Marriage, Fire City, Killing Honour, Rani & Sukh, The Crew, The Whisper, Angel Collector, The Last Taboo, The Gun, Shivers.
- Janette Rallison: It's a Mall World After All, Fame, Glory, and Other Things on My To Do List, Life, Love, and the Pursuit of Free Throws
- Ellen Raskin: The Westing Game, Figgs & Phantoms
- Wilson Rawls: Where the Red Fern Grows
- C. J. Redwine: Defiance trilogy, Ravenspire series, Rise of the Vicious Princess
- Carolyn Reeder: Shades of Gray
- Celia Rees: Witch Child, Sorceress, The Wish House, The Vanished, The Cunning Man, Pirates!
- David Rees: Storm Surge, Quintin's Man, In the Tent, Risks
- Sarah Rees Brennan: The Demon's Lexicon, The Demon's Covenant, In Other Lands
- Philip Reeve: Mortal Engines Quartet, Larklight, Starcross, Here Lies Arthur
- Kathryn Reiss: The Glass House People, Dreadful Sorry, PaperQuake, Blackthorn Winter
- Louise Rennison: Angus, Thongs and Full-Frontal Snogging, ...And That's When It Fell Off in My Hand
- Jason Reynolds: All American Boys, Boy in the Black Suit, Long Way Down, Ghost
- Morton Rhue: The Wave, Asphalt Tribe, Boot Camp
- Randy Ribay: Patron Saints of Nothing, After the Shot Drops
- Ransom Riggs: Miss Peregrine's Home for Peculiar Children
- Ann Rinaldi: A Break with Charity, The Last Silk Dress, Numbering All the Bones, Wolf by the Ears
- Rick Riordan: Percy Jackson series
- Thomas Rockwell: How To Eat Fried Worms, How to Fight a Girl
- Ginny Rorby: Dolphin Sky, Hurt Go Happy
- Malcolm Rose: Traces series, The Death Gene, Plague, Transplant, The Tortured Wood
- Liz Rosenberg: Heart and Soul, 17: A Novel in Prose Poems
- Meg Rosoff: How I Live Now, Just in Case, What I Was
- Veronica Rossi: Under the Never Sky, Through the Ever Night, Into the Still Blue
- Veronica Roth: Divergent trilogy, Carve the Mark
- Rainbow Rowell: Eleanor & Park, Fangirl, Carry On
- J. K. Rowling: Harry Potter series
- Lois Ruby: Shanghai Shadows
- Anna Rutgers van der Loeff: Children on the Oregon Trail (De Kinderkaravaan)
- Marie Rutkoski: The Winner's trilogy
- Chris Ryan: Alpha Force series, Code Red series
- Patrick Ryan: Saints of Augustine, In Mike We Trust, Gemini Bites
- Cynthia Rylant: Missing May, I Had Seen Castles, God Went to Beauty School

== S ==
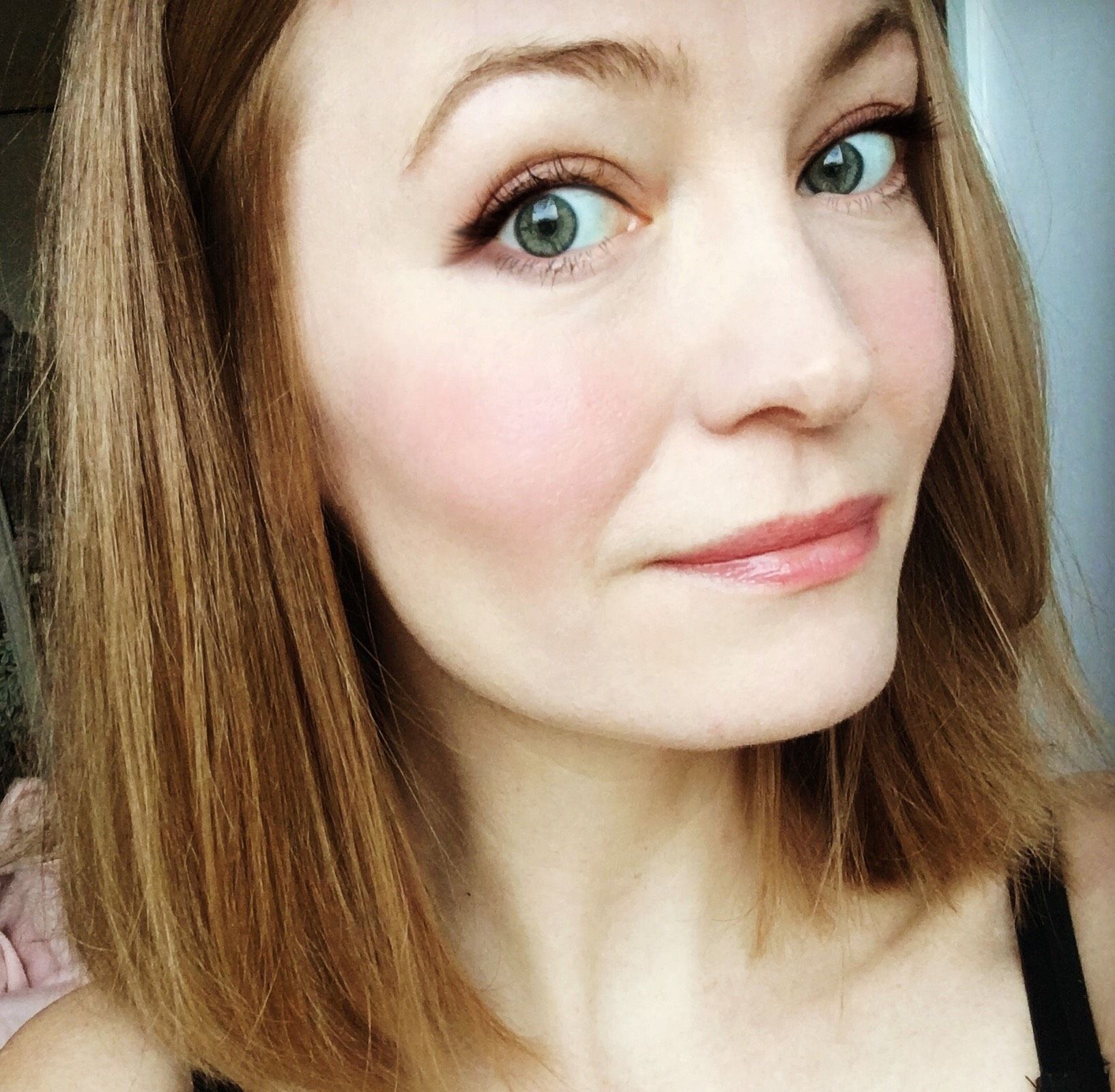
Holly Smale

- Louis Sachar: Holes, Small Steps
- Benjamin Alire Sáenz: Sammy and Juliana in Hollywood, Aristotle and Dante Discover the Secrets of the Universe
- Françoise Sagan: Bonjour Tristesse
- J. D. Salinger: The Catcher in the Rye, Franny and Zooey
- Graham Salisbury: Shark Bait, Island Boyz, Lord of the Deep, Under the Blood Red Sun, Jungle Dogs, Eyes of the Emperor
- Liselle Sambury: Blood Like Magic
- Alex Sánchez: Rainbow Boys, So Hard to Say, Getting It, The God Box
- Erika Sánchez: I Am Not Your Perfect Mexican Daughter
- Chris Sanders: Rescue Sirens: The Search for the Atavist
- Brandon Sanderson: Skyward series
- Gavril Savit: Anna and the Swallow Man, The Way Back
- Kurtis Scaletta: Mudville, Mamba Point, The Tanglewood Terror
- Ellen Schreiber: Vampire Kisses series
- Victoria Schwab: Monsters of Verity series
- Elizabeth Scott: Bloom, Perfect You, Stealing Heaven, Living Dead Girl, Something Maybe, Love You Hate You Miss You
- Kieran Scott: I Was a Non-Blonde Cheerleader, Geek Magnet
- Michael Scott: The Secrets of the Immortal Nicholas Flamel series
- Lisa See: Snow Flower and the Secret Fan
- Marcus Sedgwick: The Book of Dead Days, The Dark Flight Down, Blood Red, Snow White, My Swordhand is Singing
- Ruta Sepetys: Between Shades of Gray, Salt to the Sea, I Must Betray You
- Darren Shan: The Saga of Darren Shan (Cirque Du Freak), The Demonata, The City, The Saga of Larten Crepsley
- Dyan Sheldon: Confessions of a Teenage Drama Queen
- Sara Shepard: Pretty Little Liars series, The Lying Game
- Zoa Sherburne: Jennifer, Too Bad About the Haines Girl
- Valerie Sherrard: Sarah's Legacy, Testify, Counting Back from Nine, The Glory Wind
- Gena Showalter: Intertwined
- Mark Shulman: Scrawl, Secret Hiding Places
- Neal Shusterman: The Dark Side of Nowhere, Downsiders, The Schwa Was Here, Full Tilt
- Adam Silvera: More Happy Than Not, They Both Die at the End
- Marilyn Singer: The Course of True Love Never Did Run Smooth, Horsemaster
- Sarah Singleton: Century, Heretic, Sacrifice, The Amethyst Child, The Poison Garden
- Alan Lawrence Sitomer: The Hoopster, Hip Hop High School, Homeboyz
- William Sleator (primarily high concept sci-fi): House of Stairs, Singularity, The Boy Who Reversed Himself, Interstellar Pig
- Andrew A. Smith: Grasshopper Jungle, Winger
- Betty Smith: A Tree Grows in Brooklyn
- Dodie Smith: I Capture the Castle
- L. J. Smith: The Vampire Diaries, Night World, The Forbidden Game, The Secret Circle, Dark Visions
- Roland Smith: Peak
- Sonya Sones: What My Mother Doesn't Know, What My Girlfriend Doesn't Know
- Gary Soto: The Afterlife, Baseball in April and other Stories, Living Up the Street
- Ivan Southall: Josh, Ash Road, Hills End, To the Wild Sky, Bread and Honey, Fly West, the Simon Black series.
- Beatrice Sparks (publishing as Anonymous): Go Ask Alice, Jay's Journal
- Nicholas Sparks: The Notebook, The Last Song, Dear John, A Walk To Remember
- Elizabeth George Speare: The Witch of Blackbird Pond
- Eleanor Spence: The October Child, A Candle for St. Antony
- Jerry Spinelli: There's a Girl in My Hammerlock, Crash, Stargirl
- Nancy Springer: I Am Mordred, I Am Morgan le Fay, Blood Trail, Dussie, The Boy on a Black Horse
- Andreas Steinhöfel: The Center of the World
- Agnieszka Stelmaszyk: the series Kroniki Archeo, Koalicja Szpiegów, Terra Incognita, Klub Przyrodnika
- ND Stevenson: Nimona
- Caroline Stevermer: Sorcery and Cecelia, or The Enchanted Chocolate Pot, A College of Magics, River Rats
- Maggie Stiefvater: The Wolves of Mercy Falls, The Raven Cycle
- R. L. Stine: Fear Street series
- Laurie Faria Stolarz: Blue is for Nightmares, Project 17
- Nic Stone: Dear Martin
- Tanya Lee Stone: A Bad Boy Can Be Good for a Girl
- Francisco X. Stork: Marcelo in the Real World
- Mats Strandberg: Engelsfors
- Todd Strasser: Boot Camp, Give a Boy a Gun, The Accident, Can't Get There from Here
- Jonathan Stroud: The Bartimaeus Trilogy, The Leap
- Zoe Sugg: Girl Online
- Deirdre Sullivan: Perfectly Preventable Deaths, Needlework, Tangleweed and Brine
- Nova Ren Suma: Imaginary Girls, The Walls Around Us
- Courtney Summers: Sadie
- Rosemary Sutcliff: The Eagle of the Ninth, Warrior Scarlet, The Mark of the Horse Lord
- Krystal Sutherland: Our Chemical Hearts, House of Hollow
- Tabitha Suzuma: From Where I Stand, Forbidden, Hurt

== T ==
- Robin Talley: Lies We Tell Ourselves
- Sabaa Tahir: An Ember in the Ashes
- Mariko Tamaki: This One Summer, Laura Dean Keeps Breaking Up with Me
- Janet Tashjian: The Gospel According to Larry, Vote for Larry
- Mildred Taylor: Roll of Thunder, Hear My Cry, Let the Circle Be Unbroken, The Land
- Laini Taylor: Daughter of Smoke and Bone, Strange the Dreamer
- Jean Thesman: Appointment with a Stranger, Cattail Moon, Calling the Swan, A Sea So Far
- Aiden Thomas: Cemetery Boys
- Angie Thomas: The Hate U Give, On the Come Up
- Joyce Carol Thomas: Marked by Fire
- Rob Thomas: Rats Saw God, Green Thumb
- Kate Thompson: Annan Water, The Beguilers, The New Policeman
- Johanna Thydell: In the Ceiling the Stars Are Shining
- Sharon Tregenza: Tarantula Tide
- Megan Whalen Turner: The Thief
- Mark Twain: The Adventures of Tom Sawyer

== U ==
- Ngozi Ukazu: Check, Please!
- Eleanor Updale: Montmorency

== V ==
- Vivian Vande Velde: Heir Apparent, User Unfriendly, Never Trust a Dead Man, Dragon's Bait
- Wendelin Van Draanen: Sammy Keyes series, Flipped, The Running Dream, Wild Bird, Runaway
- Lizzie Velásquez: Be Beautiful, Be You
- Siobhan Vivian: The List, Burn for Burn trilogy (co-written with Jenny Han), The Last Boy and Girl in the World
- Ned Vizzini: It's Kind of a Funny Story, Be More Chill
- Cynthia Voigt: Homecoming, Dicey's Song, Come a Stranger, A Solitary Blue, Sons from Afar, Izzy, Willy-Nilly, Bad Girls
- Seita Vuorela: Viimi, Karikko, Lumi

== W ==
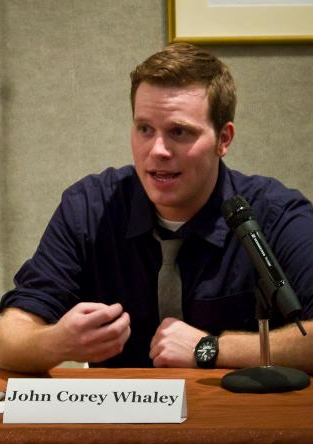
John Corey Whaley

- Judy Waite: Shopaholic, Forbidden
- Melissa Walker: Violet on the Runway, Violet by Design, Violet in Private, Lovestruck Summer
- Jeannette Walls: The Glass Castle, Half-Broke Horses
- Eric Walters: The Hydrofoil Mystery, Camp X, Shattered
- Jen Wang: The Prince and the Dressmaker
- James Watson: Talking in Whispers, Ticket to Prague, Justice of the Dagger
- Catherine Webb: Mirror Dreams, Mirror Wakes, Timekeepers, Waywalkers
- Jean Webster: Daddy-Long-Legs, Dear Enemy
- Elizabeth Wein: Code Name Verity
- Dan Wells: I Am Not a Serial Killer, Partials Sequence
- Rosemary Wells: Through the Hidden Door
- Nancy Werlin: Are You Alone on Purpose, The Killer's Cousin, Locked Inside, Black Mirror, Double Helix, The Rules of Survival
- Scott Westerfeld: Midnighters trilogy, Peeps, The Last Days, Uglies series, Leviathan series
- Suzanne Weyn: The Bar Code Tattoo
- John Corey Whaley: Where Things Come Back, Noggin, Highly Illogical Behavior
- Alex Wheatle: Liccle Bit, Crongton Knights
- Gloria Whelan: Homeless Bird
- Kiersten White: Paranormalcy
- Ysabeau S. Wilce: The Flora Segunda series
- Terry Lee Wilde: The Vampire...In My Dreams, Deidre's Secret
- Lili Wilkinson: Scatterheart
- Rita Williams-Garcia: Like Sisters on the Homefront, Every Time a Rainbow Dies, No Laughter Here
- N. D. Wilson: The Dragon's Tooth, Boys of Blur, The Legend of Sam Miracle
- Pam Withers: Take It to the Xtreme series, Daredevil Club, First Descent
- Ellen Wittlinger: Heart on My Sleeve, Hard Love, What's in A Name
- Yu Wo: ½ Prince
- Allan Wolf: The Snow Fell Three Graves Deep, The Watch That Ends the Night, New Found Land
- Virginia Euwer Wolff: True Believer, Making Lemonade
- Christopher Wooding: Broken Sky, The Haunting of Alaizabel Cray, Storm Thief, Poison, Kerosene, End Game
- Jacqueline Woodson: Miracle's Boys, Brown Girl Dreaming
- Patricia C. Wrede: Enchanted Forest Chronicles
- Richard Wright (primarily an author of works for adults): Black Boy (autobiography of his youth)
- Diana Wynne Jones: See above, Jones.

== Y ==
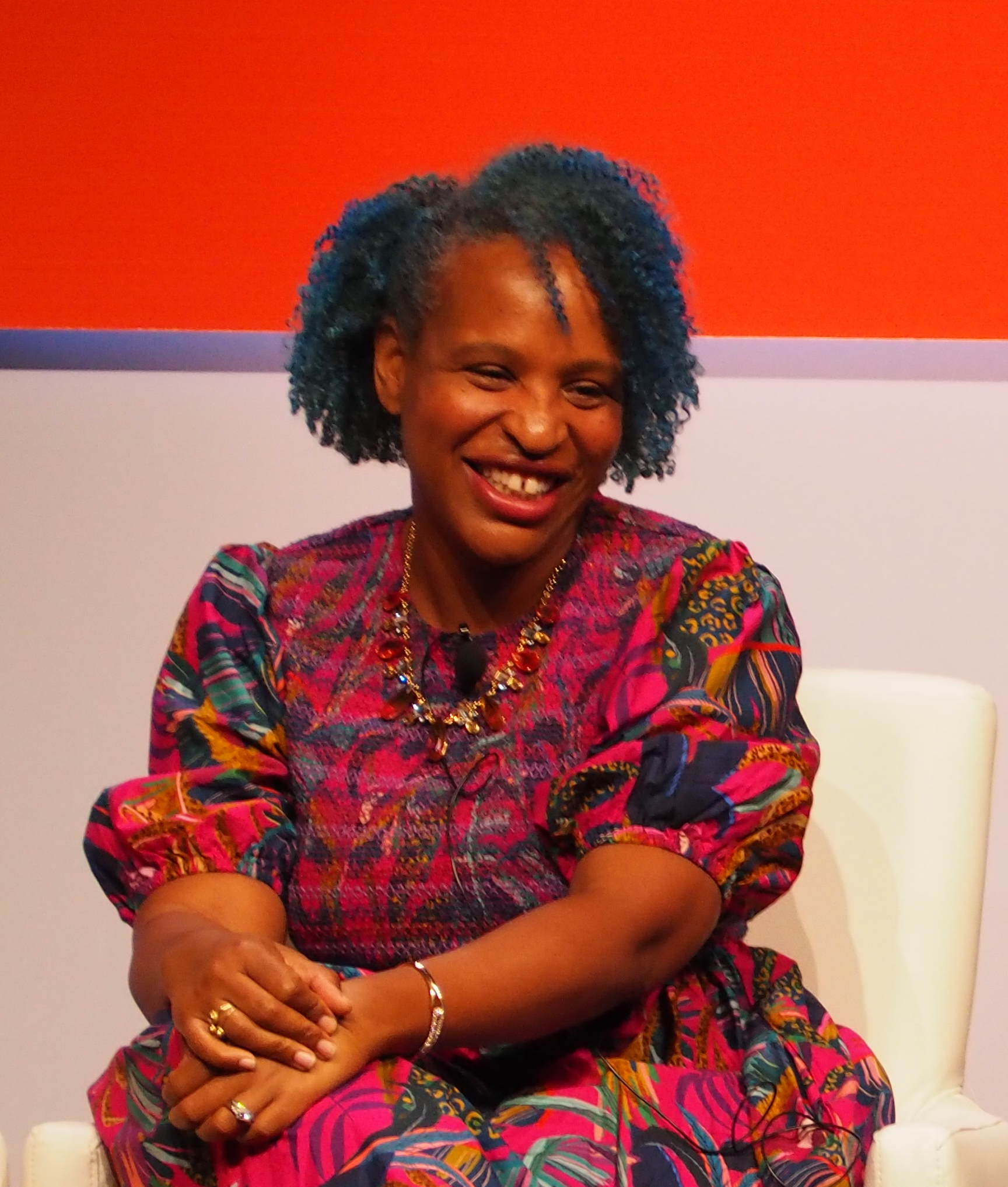
Nicola Yoon

- Rick Yancey: The 5th Wave
- Gene Luen Yang: American Born Chinese
- Laurence Yep: Liar Liar, The Lost Garden
- Jane Yolen: The Pit Dragon Trilogy, Briar Rose, The Devil's Arithmetic
- Honobu Yonezawa: Hyōka
- David Yoo: Girls for Breakfast, Stop Me if You've Heard This One Before
- Nicola Yoon: Everything, Everything, The Sun Is Also a Star

== Z ==
- Allen Zadoff: Food, Girls, and Other Things I Can't Have, My Life, the Theater, and Other Tragedies
- Carlos Ruiz Zafón: The Prince of Mist, Marina
- Timothy Zahn: Dragonback series
- Sara Zarr: Story of a Girl, How to Save a Life, Once Was Lost
- Gabrielle Zevin: Elsewhere, Memoirs of a Teenage Amnesiac
- Kat Zhang: What's Left of Me
- Xiran Jay Zhao: Iron Widow
- Cecily von Ziegesar: Gossip Girl series, It Girl series
- Paul Zindel: The Pigman, The Pigman's Legacy, My Darling, My Hamburger, Pardon Me, You're Stepping on My Eyeball!, Confessions of a Teenage Baboon
- Ibi Zoboi: American Street, Pride
- Markus Zusak: The Book Thief, The Messenger

== See also ==
- List of children's literature writers
- Lists of writers
- List of teen films
- Teen drama
- List of books written by teenagers
