= Replay (Creech novel) =

Children's novel by Sharon Creech

- First edition cover
- Author: Sharon Creech
- Audio read by: Christopher Burns
- Publisher: HarperCollins
- Publication date: September 27, 2005
- ISBN: 0-06-054019-2

Replay (2005) is a children's novel by American writer Sharon Creech.

== Plot ==
Leo is 12 years old, imaginative, sympathetic, but often lost in his large family, with his busy parents, older sister, two younger brothers, and large extended family. He has just tried out for the school play, a fantasy about an old man who accepts two lost children into his life and regains some of his childhood magic, and Leo is cast oddly as "the old crone". At the same time, Leo is learning more about his father after finding an old autobiography his father wrote at 13 and has had stashed in his attic along with some tap shoes. Part of the discovery is of the existence of a long-lost aunt. Leo's friend Ruby, who plays a donkey in the play, also reveals the death of her younger brother. Leo is trying to make sense of losses, life-changes, and regrets as the play and his life lead to mutual revelations.

Leo wonders about the mysteries of his life, not least of all, why his father is so sad and what happened to Rosaria, his sister, and why no one mentions her. Leo feels lost in the sea of people that are his family. He dreams of changing the world, or at least getting his family to notice him. Leo's family is very busy with their own problems, and hardly talk to him besides to tell him to do one chore or another. Near the beginning of the book Leo joins a play.

== Reception ==
Replay was mostly well received by critics, including a starred review from Booklist. Kirkus Reviews described it as a "warm, funny, philosophical novel", and Book Dragon writing, "Creech's readers be asking for her next memorable tale!" Common Sense Media's Matt Berman found "little objectionable here, and much of real value", noting that "it's a book that can cause children to look at those around them with new vision and empathy."

In a more mixed review Publishers Weekly wrote,

Some readers may be disappointed not to see more development of the relationship between Leo and his father. But the author artfully weaves together dreams, memories and minor crises that occur at home and onstage, to create a tapestry of images and voices that celebrate both the imagination and family."

Booklist also reviewed the audiobook narrated by Christopher Burns.
