= Heartbeat (Creech novel) =

2004 children's novel by Sharon Creech

- Author: Sharon Creech
- Publisher: HarperCollins
- Publication date: March 1, 2004
- ISBN: 0-06-054022-2

Heartbeat is a 2004 children's book by American writer Sharon Creech, published by HarperCollins in the US and Bloomsbury in the UK. It is aimed at children aged 10 and above.

Like Love That Dog, the book is written in free verse, which alters according to both the subject and the main character's mood.

== Summary ==
Twelve-year-old Annie is having a significant year. Her mother is pregnant, her grandfather is forgetful, her best friend is always moody, and she has a new art assignment: draw an apple each day for one hundred days. She is friends with Max, a mysterious boy that wants to "escape."

== Publication history ==
- ISBN 0-7475-6902-9, hardback, 2004
- ISBN 0-7475-7147-3, paperback, 2005

== Reception and awards ==
Adèle Geras of The Guardian gave the novel a positive review, praising its ability to get straight to the point. According to Geras, although "verse novels are risky", Creech's verse "will encourage young readers to put their own emotions into words precisely because the form is so much less daunting than thickets of dense prose."

Heartbeat was nominated for the 2005 Carnegie Medal. The Association for Library Service to Children included the audiobook rendition on their 2005 Notable Children's Recordings list.
