= Chasing Redbird =

Novel by Sharon Creech

- First edition
- Author: Sharon Creech
- Illustrator: Marc Burkhardt (map)
- Language: English
- Genre: Children's
- Published: 1997 HarperTrophy - An Imprint of HarperCollinsPublishers
- Publication place: United States
- Media type: Print (hardback & paperback)
- Pages: 261- Paperback

Chasing Redbird is a book by Sharon Creech published in 1997. The book centers on Zinnia Taylor. Zinny sometimes mentions her friend Sal, which is a reference to Salamanca Hiddle, the protagonist of the 1995 Newbery Medal-winning Walk Two Moons.

== Plot ==
Zinnia "Zinny" Taylor, an initially quiet, yet sometimes outrageous thirteen-year-old girl. She enjoys the care of her aunt and uncle, Jessie and Nate, as her parents are preoccupied with her siblings, and she enjoys spending time outdoors. Jessie and Nate live in a home that fits snug against the Taylor home, and Zinny prefers to spend her time with her aunt and uncle, while they mostly go on nature walks. They once had a daughter, Rose, around Zinny's age who died (of whooping cough). Aunt Jessie prefers not to talk about her daughter. Because Rose caught the cough from Zinny, she has always, in some way, blamed herself for Rose's death.

Years later, Zinny accidentally rediscovers a large overgrown trail that is over two hundred years old. When her aunt unexpectedly dies, Zinny blames herself. Soon afterwards she begins to try to clear the trail. In her grief, the trail becomes an obsession, as she decides to clear and travel the entire length of it. Thinking clearing the trail is the only way to be forgiven by God, Zinny camps out on the trail to clear the trail before the end of the summer. At the same time Zinny learns to cope with her grief, her guilt, and a boy named Jake Boone, who she starts to have feelings for.

Throughout the story she must attempt to get over the death of Rose and Aunt Jessie. She also tries to find out whether Jake returns her feelings or is just using her to get to her older sister, May. Through all this Zinny finally finds something to call her very own, the trail that she cleared.

Throughout the story Creech uses flashbacks as a literary device, showing snippets of what Zinny's life was like before her Aunt's death, and how her life changed after her dear Aunt Jessie died.
