= The Graveyard Book =

2008 young adult novel by Neil Gaiman

- Front cover of first Adult's Edition
- Author: Neil Gaiman
- Illustrator: Dave McKean; Chris Riddell
- Cover artist: McKean (Adult's Edition); Riddell (Children's Edition)
- Language: English
- Genre: Children's fantasy, horror fiction
- Publisher: HarperCollins (US); Bloomsbury (UK)
- Publication date: 30 September 2008 (US)
- Publication place: United Kingdom
- Media type: Print, e-book, audiobook
- Pages: 312 (first edition)
- ISBN: 978-0-06-053092-1
- OCLC: 179806700
- LC Class: PZ7.G1273 Gr 2008

The Graveyard Book is a young adult novel written by the English author Neil Gaiman, simultaneously published in the United Kingdom and in the United States in 2008. The Graveyard Book traces the story of the boy Nobody "Bod" Owens, who is adopted and reared by the supernatural occupants of a graveyard after his family is brutally murdered.

Gaiman won both the British Carnegie Medal and the American Newbery Medal recognizing the year's best children's books, the first time both named the same work. (Note: The British writer Sharon Creech previously won both Medals for different books, the 1994 Newbery for Walk Two Moons and the 2002 Carnegie for Ruby Holler. • The British CILIP inherited the Library Association children's book awards when it was created by merger of the library and information professionals in 2001. Around that time, the Carnegie Medal restriction to British publishers and British authors (British subjects) was relaxed to permit nomination of all new books published in Britain originally or nearly so (within three months as of 2012). Gaiman was also eligible for the Newbery Medal as he is resident in the United States, although not a citizen.) The Graveyard Book also won the annual Hugo Award for Best Novel from the World Science Fiction Convention and Locus Award for Best Young Adult Book selected by Locus subscribers.

Chris Riddell, who illustrated the British children's edition, made the Kate Greenaway Medal shortlist. It was the first time in the award's 30-year history that one book made both the author and illustrator shortlists. Time magazine included the novel in its list of the 100 Best Young-Adult Books of All Time. There have been several attempts to adapt The Graveyard Book into a film, with the most recent one being aborted following several sexual assault allegations against Gaiman.

== Concept and development ==
Gaiman first had the idea for the story in 1985, after seeing his then-two-year-old son Mike "pedaling his tricycle around a graveyard" near their home in East Grinstead, West Sussex. Recalling how comfortable his son looked there, Gaiman thought he "could write something a lot like The Jungle Book and set it in a graveyard". When he sat down to write, however, Gaiman decided he was "not yet a good enough writer" and came to the same conclusion as he revisited it every few years. He eventually published it in 2008.

The bulk of the book is about the protagonist's adventures in and out of the graveyard in which he lives as he grows up. Throughout his adventures, Bod learns supernatural abilities such as Fading (which allows Bod to turn invisible, but only if no one is paying attention to him), Haunting (which allows Bod to make people feel uneasy, though this ability can be amplified to terrify them), and Dreamwalking (going into others' dreams and controlling the dream, though he cannot cause physical harm). Each of the eight chapters is a short story, each set two years after the preceding chapter. Some chapters have analogues to Rudyard Kipling's 1894 work; for example, the chapter "The Hounds of God" parallels the story "Kaa's Hunting".

== Plot ==
The man Jack murders three members of a family but fails to kill the youngest child, a one-and-a-half-year-old boy. The child had crawled out of the house and up a hill to a graveyard where ghosts find him. His mother, as a ghost, asks them to protect the child, and the ghosts ultimately agree to raise him. Mrs. Owens, the ghost who first discovered the baby, and her husband Mr. Owens become his adoptive parents. The baby is named Nobody Owens (a play on "nobody owns") and is granted the Freedom of the Graveyard, which allows Nobody to pass through solid objects when in the graveyard, including its gates. The mysterious caretaker Silas, who exists on the border between life and death, agrees to act as Nobody's "guardian", providing for and protecting him. The man Jack is persuaded by Silas that the toddler isn't there, and leaves.

As a young child, Nobody (often called Bod) begins learning to read and write and befriends a girl called Scarlett Perkins, whose parents regularly bring her to play in the graveyard. It is with her that Bod discovers a creature called the Sleer, who has been waiting for thousands of years within a prehistoric barrow for his "Master" to come and reclaim him, along with the treasures he guards: a knife, a goblet, and a brooch. The Sleer initially attempts to scare the two away with a ghostly projection, but Bod sees through the ruse and the Sleer relents. Shortly afterward, Scarlett's family moves to Glasgow.

Silas temporarily leaves the graveyard "to obtain some information", and Miss Lupescu arrives to take care of six-year-old Bod in his absence. She brings Bod home-made food and tutors him, as Bod develops a distaste for Miss Lupescu's strictness and unique cooking. Bod is then tricked by the Ghouls, a race of corpse-eating creatures that live in an alternative dimension accessed by a special grave called a Ghoulgate. Bod is taken through a Ghoulgate and finds out the Ghouls' true intent to either convert him into one of their own or eat him. Bod is subsequently rescued by Miss Lupescu, discovering she is a werewolf. The two's relationship improves after the event.

On Bod's 14th year at the graveyard, Scarlett and her mother come back to the town, and she and Bod reunite. Scarlett has also made friends with a historian called Mr. Jay Frost who is living in a house not too far from the graveyard. Researching the murder of Bod's family, Scarlett learns that the historian lives in the house that Bod's family once lived in. Bod visits the house, to learn more about his family. When showing Bod the room he lived in as a baby, Mr. Frost reveals that he actually is the man Jack; Jack Frost is his full name.

Bod is chased by the man Jack and four other members of the society of Jacks of All Trades. Bod and Scarlett escape to the graveyard where Bod defeats each Jack separately, except for Jack Frost. Jack Frost takes Scarlett captive in the chamber of the Sleer but is then tricked by Bod into claiming to be the Sleer's master. The Sleer engulfs Jack Frost in an "embrace", and they disappear into the wall, presumably "protecting him from the world", forever. Silas returns, and it is revealed that he and Miss Lupescu are members of the Honour Guard, devoted to protecting "the borders between things". Though they succeed in destroying the society, Miss Lupescu is killed in battle, to Silas and Bod's great sorrow.

Scarlett is shocked and appalled by the events of the night and Bod's ethically questionable actions in the course of defeating Jack Frost. Silas removes Scarlett's memories about what happened that night, and uses his power of suggestion to convince Scarlett and her mother to return to Glasgow.

In the final chapter of the book, Bod is "about 15" and is slowly losing the Freedom of the Graveyard and even his ability to see ghosts. At the end of the book, Silas gives Bod some money and a passport. Bod says his goodbyes to his ghostly family and friends and leaves the graveyard to embark on the rest of his life.

== Publication history ==
The fourth chapter, "The Witch's Headstone", was published as a short story in the Gaiman anthology M Is for Magic and in Wizards: Magical Tales from the Masters of Modern Fantasy and won the 2008 Locus Award for Best Novelette. The book was released on 30 September 2008 in the United States by HarperCollins and on 31 October in the United Kingdom by Bloomsbury Publishing. The cover and interior illustrations of the US edition were created by longtime Gaiman collaborator Dave McKean; he illustrated the UK edition for the adult market. The simultaneous British Children's Edition was illustrated by Chris Riddell, for which he made the 2010 Kate Greenaway Medal shortlist.

Subterranean Press published an American limited edition with a different cover and interior illustrations by McKean.

HarperAudio published an audiobook edition read by Gaiman. It includes a version of "Danse macabre" played by Béla Fleck, which Fleck provided after reading on Gaiman's blog that he hoped for "Danse Macabre with banjo in it". It won Audiobook of the Year (the "Audie") and the Audie Award for Children's Title for Ages Eight to Twelve from the Audio Publishers Association (US).

In 2014, HarperAudio published a full-cast audiobook edition performed by Derek Jacobi (narrator), Robert Madge (Bod), Clare Corbett, Miriam Margolyes (Mrs. Owens), Andrew Scott (the Man Jack), Julian Rhind-Tutt (Silas), Emilia Fox, Reece Shearsmith, Lenny Henry, and an ensemble cast. Special content in this edition includes the story behind The Graveyard Book, written and performed by Gaiman. This edition won three Audie Awards in 2015:

- Audie Award for Children's Title for Ages Eight to Twelve
- Audie Award for Multi-Voiced Performance
- Audie Award for Distinguished Achievement in Production

== Critical reception ==
The Graveyard Book was cited by the American Library Association for its "delicious mix of murder, fantasy, humor and human longing", noting its "magical, haunting prose". The New York Times's Monica Edinger was very positive about the book, concluding: "In this novel of wonder, Neil Gaiman follows in the footsteps of long-ago storytellers, weaving a tale of unforgettable enchantment". Kirkus Reviews awarded it a starred review, claiming that "this needs to be read by anyone who is or has ever been a child". Author Patrick Ness wrote, "what's lost in forward momentum is more than made up for by the outrageous riches of Gaiman's imagination" and praised the villains. The Independent praised the novel's different tones. Richard Bleiler described the novel as a piece of neo-Gothic fiction echoing back to Horace Walpole's The Castle of Otranto. In 2013, a blogger recommended The Graveyard Book for children, describing the premise as "staggeringly original" and the structure "satisfyingly episodic".

=== Awards ===
Literary Awards (Gaiman's text)	Year	Result
Newbery Medal	2009	Won
Hugo Award for Best Novel	2009	Won
Locus Award for Best Young Adult Novel	2008	Won
Carnegie Medal	2010	Won
British Fantasy Award for Best Novel	2009	Nominated
World Fantasy Award for Best Novel	2009	Nominated
Mythopoeic Award for Children's Literature	2009	Nominated

Chris Riddell made the Kate Greenaway Medal shortlist for his illustrations of the Children's Edition.

Gaiman and Harper Audio won the 2009 Audie Award for their audiobook edition.

HarperAudio's full-cast edition won the 2015 Audie Award Distinguished Achievement in Production.

== Film adaptation ==
In January 2009, filmmaker Neil Jordan signed on to write and direct a film adaptation for Miramax. In May 2010, CJ Entertainment, associated with Chris Columbus's 1492 Pictures, acquired the rights for distribution in Korea and Japan and agreed to co-finance the adaptation.

In April 2012, Walt Disney Pictures acquired the rights and hired Henry Selick, director of The Nightmare Before Christmas and the film adaptation of Gaiman's novel Coraline, to direct The Graveyard Book. The film was moved to Pixar, which would have made it the company's first adapted work. After the studio and Selick parted ways over scheduling and development, in January 2013, Ron Howard was attached to direct the film, but he dropped out to work on other projects as well, thus the film was in development hell for some time.

In July 2022, Marc Forster was attached to direct the feature film adaptation with Renée Wolfe, Gil Netter and Ben Brown set to produce, and David Magee writing the script. Later that year, Neil Gaiman stated that he has no involvement with the film. In September 2024, it was reported that the production had been halted due to a variety of factors including sexual misconduct allegations against Gaiman.

== Graphic novel adaptation ==
Artist P. Craig Russell, along with Galen Showman, Kevin Nowlan, Jill Thompson, David Lafuente, Stephen Scott, Scott Hampton and Tony Harris, has adapted the book into a two-volume graphic novel. The first volume was released on 29 July 2014, followed by the second on 7 October. A one-volume edition was published in October 2016.

== Notes ==
Awards
Preceded by Bog Child	Carnegie Medal recipient 2010	Succeeded by Monsters of Men
Preceded by Good Masters! Sweet Ladies! Voices from a Medieval Village	Newbery Medal recipient 2009	Succeeded by When You Reach Me
