= Absolutely Normal Chaos =

Novel by Sharon Creech

- First edition (UK) cover, designed by Sharon Creech
- Author: Sharon Creech
- Language: English
- Genre: Children's novel, journal, day-school story
- Publisher: Macmillan Children's Books
- Publication date: 1990
- Publication place: United Kingdom
- Media type: Print (hardcover)
- Pages: 201 pp
- ISBN: 0-333-53218-X
- OCLC: 22663752
- LC Class: PZ7.C8615 Ab 1995

Absolutely Normal Chaos is a children's or young-adult novel by Sharon Creech, published in the U.K. by Macmillan Children's Books in 1990. It was the American author's first book for children, completed at the midpoint of nearly two decades living in England and Switzerland. Although set in her hometown Euclid, Ohio, it was not published in her native country until 1995 (HarperCollins), after she won the annual Newbery Medal recognizing Walk Two Moons as the preceding year's best American children's book.

Absolutely Normal Chaos is a 13-year-old girl's "complete and unabridged journal for English class" and can be classed as a bildungsroman.

== Synopsis ==
Mary Lou Finney is more than excited about her assignment to keep a journal over the summer. Not only does she have to keep a journal, but she must read the Odyssey. The Odyssey is continuously mentioned in her writing in reference to her own life.

As the novel unfolds, Mary Lou's cousin, Carl Ray stays with her family in order to look for a job. As the novel progresses, Mary Lou learns about his difficulties in life and how he has struggled. She then finds it easier to examine her struggles with her family, her friends, and herself.

Creech stated that the inspiration for this story was an occasion when "I'd been living overseas (England and Switzerland) for about ten years, and I was sadly missing my family back in the States. I thought I'd write a story about normal family chaos and that's how this began, with me trying to remember what it was like growing up in my family. Writing the story was a way for me to feel as if my family were with me, right there in our little cottage in England.".
