= Sharon Creech =

American writer (born 1945)

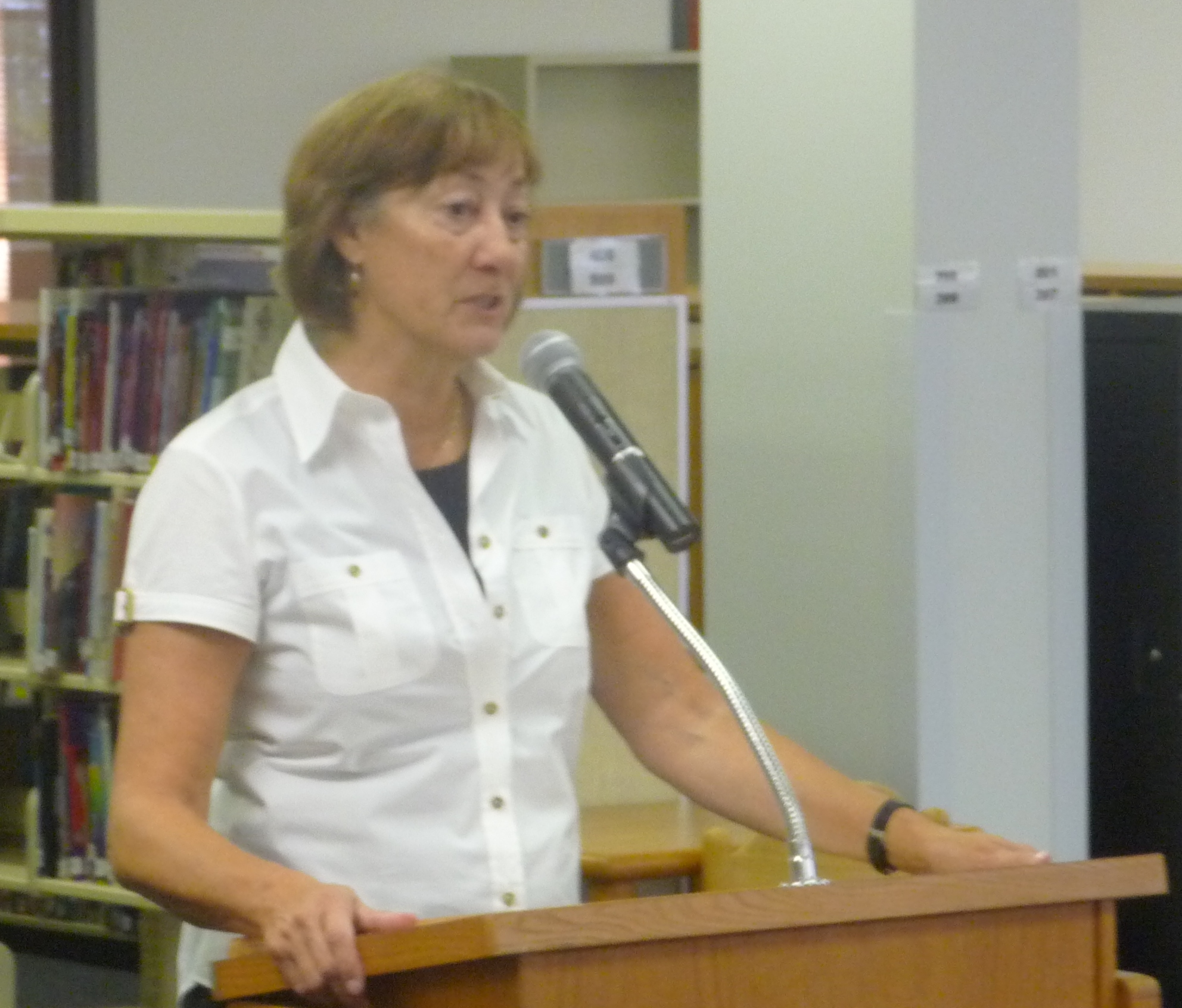
- Creech in 2009
- Born: July 29, 1945 (age 81); South Euclid, Ohio, U.S.
- Occupation: Novelist
- Writing career
- Genres: Children's novels, low fantasy, magic realism; poetry
- Notable works: Walk Two Moons; Ruby Holler
- Notable awards: Newbery Medal; 1995; Carnegie Medal; 2002
- Website: sharoncreech.com

Sharon Creech (born July 29, 1945) is an American writer of children's novels. She was the first American winner of the Carnegie Medal for British children's books and the first person to win both the American Newbery Medal and the British Carnegie. (Note: CILIP inherited the (British) Library Association children's book awards when it was created by merger of the library and information professionals in 2001. Around that time, the Carnegie Medal restriction to British publishers and British authors (British subjects) was relaxed to permit nomination of all new books published in Britain originally or nearly so (three months as of 2012). The Newbery Medal is still restricted to American citizen or resident authors. • Neil Gaiman later won both Medals for The Graveyard Book (2009). He is an English expatriate in the U.S. since 1992.)

== Biography ==
Sharon Creech was born in South Euclid, Ohio, a suburb of Cleveland, where she grew up with her parents (Ann and Arvel), one sister (Sandy), and three brothers (Dennis, Doug and Tom). She would often visit her cousins in Quincy, Lewis County, Kentucky, which has found its way into many of her books as the fictional Bybanks, Kentucky. Bybanks is in Walk Two Moons, Chasing Redbird, and Bloomability, and there is an allusion to it in The Wanderer.

At college in the U.S. she became intrigued by story-telling after taking literature and writing courses, and she later became a teacher of secondary school English and Writing in England and Switzerland. Her first children's novel, Absolutely Normal Chaos, was published only in the U.K., by Macmillan Children's Books in 1990. Called "comedy about contemporary teen life" by Kirkus Reviews, it featured a 13-year-old girl's "complete and unabridged journal for English class". Her first book published in the U.S. was Walk Two Moons (1994), which won the American Newbery Medal in 1995. Later that year, Absolutely Normal Chaos was first published in the U.S. by HarperCollins —set in her hometown Euclid, Ohio.

Creech returned to the U.S. in 1998 after 18 years abroad. She is married to Lyle Rigg, a headmaster in New Jersey, and has two grown children, Rob and Karin.

== Books ==
She has written both novels and picture books. She often embeds serious topics into her stories, including such themes as independence, trust, childhood, adulthood, and death, often using humour to soften them.

Books such as Love That Dog and Heartbeat were written in verse, whereas other books like Ruby Holler and Walk Two Moons are in a narrative style.

Bloomability (1998) features an American girl at a boarding school in Switzerland. The setting was inspired by The American School In Switzerland, where Creech taught English.

She returned to the fictional school exercise in Love That Dog (Harper Collins and Bloomsbury, 2001), the blank verse diary of "Jack, a reluctant student, [who] resists poetry assignments from his teacher, Miss Stretchberry." It was a commended runner-up for the British Carnegie Medal. (Note: Since 1995 there are usually eight books on the Carnegie shortlist. According to CCSU, there were about 160 commendations of two kinds in 49 years from 1954 to 2002, including Creech and Geraldine McCaughrean (highly commended) for 2001. In effect, Creech and Love That Dog were second runner-up for that year.)

== Awards ==
In 1995, Walk Two Moons won the Newbery Medal from the American Library Association, recognizing the year's best children's book by an American author. In the U.K., it won the annual Children's Book Award for long novels, voted by children, and the Reading Association Award. In 1997, it also won the Literaturhaus Award, Austria, and the Young Adult Sequoyah Award, Oklahoma, USA .

Bloomability won the IRA/CBC Children's Choices award in 1999.

The Wanderer won the Parents' Choice Award, USA, in 2000, and was a runner-up for the Newbery Medal. It was one of eight books on the Carnegie Medal shortlist in the U.K.

Creech and Love That Dog were a commended runner-up for the 2001 Carnegie Medal, and she won the 2002 Medal from the British librarians, recognizing Ruby Holler as the year's best children's book published in the U.K.

== Works ==
- 1990 The Recital, novel for adults, published as Sharon Rigg
- 1991 Nickel Malley, novel for adults, published as Sharon Rigg
- 1992 The Center of the Universe: Waiting for the Girl, play
- 1990 Absolutely Normal Chaos
- 1994 Walk Two Moons
- 1996 Pleasing the Ghost
- 1997 Chasing Redbird
- 1998 Bloomability
- 2000 Fishing in the Air
- 2000 The Wanderer
- 2001 Love That Dog
- 2001 A Fine, Fine School
- 2002 Ruby Holler
- 2003 Granny Torrelli Makes Soup
- 2004 Heartbeat
- 2005 Replay
- 2006 Who's That Baby
- 2007 The Castle Corona (Illustrated by David Diaz)
- 2008 Hate That Cat
- 2009 The Unfinished Angel
- 2012 The Great Unexpected
- 2013 The Boy on the Porch
- 2016 Moo
- 2018 Saving Winslow
- 2020 One Time
- 2023 A Smart, Smart School
