= Bloomability =

Novel by Sharon Creech

- Author: Sharon Creech
- Cover artist: Lisa Falkenstern
- Language: English
- Genre: Children's
- Publisher: Joanna Cotler
- Publication date: September 30, 1998
- Publication place: United States
- Media type: Print (hardback & paperback)
- Pages: 242 pages
- ISBN: 978-0-06-440823-3
- OCLC: 42402580

Bloomability is a children's book by Sharon Creech, first published in 1998; the main character is Dinnie Doone, a young girl who at the start of the novel lives with her semi-nomadic family in the modern-day United States of America. She is given the opportunity to attend a boarding school in Lugano, Switzerland, where the majority of the storyline takes place. This school is inspired by The American School In Switzerland, where Creech taught English.

The title, "Bloomability", comes from Keisuke, one of Dinnie's friends in the book. Keisuke is a Japanese student at the school who is just learning English, so "bloomability" emerged as his linguistic concept of the word "possibility"

== Plot summary ==
Domenica Santolina Doone, known as Dinnie, has spent most of her life traveling around the United States because her father is transiently employed. Dinnie feels that she has settled into this routine of never having a permanent home until one night, her whole world changes. With her older brother in the Air Force after ending up in jail again, her sixteen-year-old sister pregnant and married, and her dad still on the road for yet another home, Dinnie is taken away by her aunt and her husband to Switzerland, where Uncle Max (her uncle) is the new headmaster of an international boarding school.

Dinnie becomes a student at the school, where she makes friends, sees new, exciting things, and has many adventures of her own. She befriends a girl named Lila, who at first seems nice but then starts complaining a lot, but Dinnie still really likes her. Dinnie also has a friend named Guthrie, a spontaneous and fun-loving "fantastico!" person. She also gets to know Keisuke and Belen, a Japanese boy and a Spanish girl, who love each other, but whose parents are not supportive of their relationship. The group is later joined by an Italian girl named Mari. During a Ski trip with the boarding school, Lila and Guthrie get trapped in an avalanche and are saved because Dinnie watched where they fell and was thus able to locate them. Both of them survived and made a full recovery.

Interspersed in the novel are Dinnie's diary entries, postcards from her two paternal aunts informing Dinnie of what is happening with her family, and Dinnie's various attempts to communicate to the local community using signs at her window that she wants to return home. However, as the year progresses, Dinnie begins to thrive in the diverse environment and the stability of remaining in one place. At the end of the year, Dinnie's aunt and uncle give her a choice: Go home to America for the summer and come back to school in the fall, or go back to America permanently. It is never said what her decision was, but Dinnie keeps her skis in the closet so that she will have to come back someday.

== Characters ==
- Mrs. Stirling

The glamorous and elegant founder of the international school that Dinnie attends. Though Max is the headmaster, Mrs. Stirling is the director of the school and highly respected by everyone. Despite her advanced age, she is extremely astute and aware of everything that is going at the school and fluent in English, French, and Italian.

- Keisuke

A boy who came from Osaka, Japan and Guthrie's best friend. Because English is not his first language, he often pronounces words differently (like stupid as "stew pod") and coins new words to define existing concepts (bloomability for "possibility"), which are picked up by his friends. He is good-humoured and bright, and has a relationship with Belen Martinez, his classmate.

- Belen Martinez

A girl who was a roommate with Lila, and is from Barcelona, Spain. She and Keisuke are in a relationship of sorts, though Belen is aware that her parents would not entirely approve of her dating a Japanese boy. She is a mature girl who comes across as somewhat moody and has strong opinions. However, she is not confrontational like Lila.

- Mari

An Italian girl from Rome, Italy who joins Dinnie and her friends later in the novel, after the school's annual ski trip. She is friendly and cheerful, though a little hot-tempered.

- Dinnie's family

Dinnie's family consists of her father Jack, her mother, her older brother Crick and her older sister Stella. Jack, who was born in Bybanks, Kentucky like Dinnie was, is constantly on the move with another job. He does not get along with his wife's family, whom he believes looks down on him for his country roots. Dinnie's mother was originally from New York and is a trained artist; though she prefers living in the city, she willingly travels around the United States in the wake of her husband's jobs. While Dinnie is in Switzerland, her mother infrequently responds to Dinnie's letters with slightly bizarre cards she has painted herself. Her mother, Dinnie's Grandma Fiorelli, originally comes from Campobasso, Italy, and disapproves of Jack's lifestyle. Dinnie's brother Crick, due to being constantly on the move, frequently falls into delinquent behavior until, shortly before Dinnie is sent to Switzerland with Sandy and Max, is forcibly enlisted into the army in order to clean up his act. In contrast, Dinnie's sixteen-year-old sister Stella secretly marries a marine named George and has a baby, Michael, before Dinnie leaves for Switzerland. Throughout the novel, Dinnie receives news about her family from her paternal aunts, Tillie and Grace, who reside in By banks and often argue with one another. The sisters, however, express great love for their niece in their letters to Dinnie and offer encouraging news.
