= Allen Zadoff =

American author of young adult fiction

- Born: Boston, Massachusetts, U.S.
- Education: Cornell University (BA); Harvard University (MFA)
- Occupation: Novelist
- Writing career
- Period: 1998–present
- Genres: Young Adult Fiction, Memoir, Comedy, Thriller
- Website: Official website

Allen Zadoff is an American author of young adult fiction. He is mainly known for his young adult novels including the series Wild & Chance and The Unknown Assassin series, as well as the book Boy Nobody. His novel Food, Girls, and Other Things I Can’t Have received the 2010 Sid Fleischman Humor Award from the Society of Children's Book Writers and Illustrators.

== Biography ==
Allen Zadoff was born in Boston, Massachusetts and later lived in upstate New York, Manhattan, Tokyo, and Los Angeles. A former stage director, he graduated from the American Repertory Theater’s Institute for Advanced Theater Training at Harvard University. He is also an alumnus of the Warner Bros. Comedy Writers Workshop in Hollywood.

Zadoff lives in Los Angeles where he works as a writer and writing teacher.

== Writing ==
=== Hungry (2007) ===
Hungry: Lessons Learned on the Journey from Fat to Thin is an adult memoir published by Da Capo Press in October 2007. The Los Angeles Times called it "gentle, funny...uncommonly appealing."

=== Food, Girls, and Other Things I Can’t Have (2009) ===
Food, Girls, and Other Things I Can't Have is a young adult novel released by Egmont USA in September 2009. VOYA described it as "a must-read for adolescents and adults alike." The paperback edition was published February 22, 2011.

Food, Girls, and Other Things I Can’t Have won the 2010 Sid Fleischman Humor Award from the Society of Children's Book Writers and Illustrators, and was a finalist for the Georgia Peach Book Awards and a nominee for the Missouri Gateway Readers Awards. The Young Adult Library Services Association (YALSA) included it on their 2010 list of Popular Paperbacks for Young Adults.

=== The Unknown Assassin trilogy (2013-2015) ===
The Unknown Assassin trilogy is published by Little, Brown Books for Young Readers in the United States and Orchard Books in the United Kingdom.

The first book, originally published as Boy Nobody, was released June 11, 2013. The paperback edition was published under the title I am the Weapon. It received starred reviews from Publishers Weekly and VOYA. In 2012, Sony Pictures optioned the feature film rights to the series with Will Smith's Overbrook Entertainment set to produce. In 2014, Young Adult Library Services Association included it on their top ten list of Quick Picks for Reluctant Young Adult Readers. It was also a finalist for Best Young Adult Novel at the 2014 International Thriller Writers Awards.

I am the Weapon was followed by I am the Mission, published June 1, 2014, and I am the Traitor, published June 9, 2015.

=== Wild & Chance series (2020) ===
Zadoff's middle grade series, Wild & Chase, is published by Little, Brown Books for Young Readers. The title book was released April 28, 2020; the second, The Puppy War, was released May 18, 2021.

=== The Donut Prince of New York (2024) ===
Zadoff's YA rom/com about a plus-size high school playwright struggling with theater, football, and first love is published by Holiday House Books and was released on November 5, 2024. The books received a starred review from Kirkus Reviews who called it “A pitch-perfect journey of self-discovery.”

== Publications ==
=== Novels ===
- Food, Girls, and Other Things I Can't Have. Egmont. 2009. ISBN 978-1-60684-004-7.
- My Life, the Theater, and Other Tragedies. Egmont. 2011. ISBN 978-1-60684-036-8.
- Since You Left Me. Egmont. 2012. ISBN 978-1-60684-296-6.

==== The Unknown Assassin series ====
1. Boy Nobody / I Am the Weapon. Little, Brown Books for Young Readers. 2013. ISBN 978-0-316-19967-4.
2. I Am the Mission. Little, Brown Books for Young Readers. 2014. ISBN 978-0-316-19969-8.
3. I Am the Traitor. Little, Brown Books for Young Readers. 2015. ISBN 978-0-316-33687-1.

==== Wild & Chance series ====
1. Wild & Chase. Little, Brown Books for Young Readers. 2020. ISBN 978-1-368-05319-8.
2. The Puppy War. Little, Brown Books for Young Readers. 2021. ISBN 978-0-7595-5621-8.

=== Memoir ===
- Hungry: Lessons Learned on the Journey from Fat to Thin. Da Capo Press. 2007. ISBN 978-0-7382-1105-3.
