= Ruby Holler =

2002 fantasy children's novel by Sharon Creech

- Front cover of first edition
- Author: Sharon Creech
- Language: English
- Genre: Children's novel
- Publisher: HarperCollins (Joanna Cotler Books)
- Publication date: 26 March 2002
- Publication place: United States
- Media type: Print (hardback & paperback)
- Pages: 310 pp (first edition)
- ISBN: 0-06-027732-7
- OCLC: 45487314
- LC Class: PZ7.C8615 Ru 2002

Ruby Holler (2002) is a novel for children by the American writer Sharon Creech, published by HarperCollins in 2002. It features adolescent orphan twins who are "trouble" and an eccentric older couple who adopt them and take them back to live in Ruby Holler (hollow).

Creech won the annual Carnegie Medal from the British librarians, recognizing the year's best children's book published in the U.K. (Bloomsbury Children's Books). In a retrospective citation, the librarians call it "a beautifully written story about love and trust and how the strength and goodness of human beings can overcome all the odds". Creech was the first American winner of the British award and the first person to win both the American Newbery Medal (Walk Two Moons, 1994) and the British Carnegie. (Note: CILIP inherited the Library Association children's book awards when it was created by merger of the library and information professionals in 2001. Around that time, the Carnegie Medal restriction to British publishers and British authors (British subjects) was relaxed to permit nomination of all new books published in Britain originally or nearly so (three months as of 2012). The Newbery Medal is still restricted to American citizen or resident authors. • Neil Gaiman later won both Medals for The Graveyard Book (2009). He is an English expatriate in the U.S. since 1992.)

== Plot ==
The story starts in the Boxton Creek Home, an 'orphanage' run by the Trepids - a strict and dishonest husband and wife. An imaginative thirteen-year-old boy named Dallas and his sassy and bold twin sister Florida have been living in the Home for a long time, often punished for breaking rules that the Trepids post all over the house. Over the years, the twins have been adopted many times and quickly returned to their Home. Because of this, they have been named the "trouble twins." They have a plan to run away and take a train to a destination far from Boxton.

Outside of Boxton, on a plot of land called Ruby Holler, Tiller and Sairy Morey, a very old couple whose children have grown up and moved away, are discussing their plans for a new adventure. The two decide to foster children, and they adopt Dallas and Florida. Although Sairy, a very kind and trusting old lady, is excited about having children at Ruby Holler again, Tiller - a "crotchety old boot" - is doubtful. The twins enjoy the freedom and adventure they find in the holler, but they're still suspicious and think that Tiller and Sairy will mistreat them the way others have - although their suspicions soon prove false. Tiller and Sairy tell Dallas and Florida they have been planning separate trips, and they want the twins to come: Dallas with Sairy to explore an island, and Florida with Tiller on a rafting trip. All four are uneasy about a separation from their life-long partner, but they don't speak about this. Tiller and Sairy use their "understone funds," underground savings that they've kept for years, to pay for their travels.

Meanwhile, Mr. Trepid hears about the understone funds from Dallas and Florida when they run into each other in Boxton, shopping for trip supplies. Mr. Trepid promises to pay a shady man called Z, who is a neighbor of Tiller and Sairy, to map out Ruby Holler. He doesn't say why he needs a map and Z feels uneasy because he likes Tiller and Sairy. He slowly begins the map while also helping the Ruby Holler family prepare for their trips. Dallas and Florida, however, still think that Tiller and Sairy are trouble and they decide to take some supplies and equipment and run away. They don't get far from the cabin. Sairy and Tiller "find" them camping out, and tell the twins it was a good idea to test the supplies and equipment. They suggest taking practice trips together, closer to home. While on their practice trips, Tiller and Sairy learn about the twins' past and realize that the Trepids are not trustworthy people.

The four start out on their trips to the river and the island. Z continues to stall with production of Mr. Trepid's map, feeling more protective of the kids since he believes that Dallas and Florida may really be his biological children: he sees their birth certificate and it looks as if their mother was Z's runaway wife. Eventually he gives Mr. Trepid a map that shows possible hiding places, but Z has removed the understone funds to protect them from Mr. Trepid. On Tiller and Florida's small trip while rafting down a river, their boat capsizes and Tiller suffers a heart attack. Luckily, Dallas, Sairy, and Z find them in time and Tiller is taken to a hospital where he recovers. Z bonds with the twins and they set up traps for Mr. Trepid who looks for the understone funds but fails to find them.

In the end, two of Tiller and Sairy's biological children visit the Holler to check on Tiller's health and suggest that the twins go back to the Boxton Creek Home. Dallas and Florida hear their conversation and run away again before hearing Tiller and Sairy's denial. In the morning, Dallas and Florida smell their breakfast cooking as usual and return home to the cabin in Ruby Holler.

== Characters ==
Dallas: Dallas is one of the protagonists of the novel. He is thirteen years old and was abandoned by his mother as an infant and lived at the Boxton Creek Home for his whole life, except when he was adopted and sent back by families that saw him and his sister as trouble. He is very imaginative and silent, often letting Florida speak for them both. He often thinks situations will turn out for the best, although he is often proven wrong. When a resident of the Boxton Creek Home was dying, Mr. Trepid told Dallas to save him, but he fails and the child dies. He somewhat admires Z and is close friends with Sairy.

Florida: Florida is Dallas's twin sister. Like him, she was abandoned to the orphanage at a young age and was sent to many homes with Dallas and then returned, and the two are very close to each other. She is very bold and outspoken, and very hateful of almost everything. She often thinks that she and Dallas can take care of themselves, although she does sometimes show care for others. When Florida first enters Ruby Holler, she is very suspicious of Tiller and Sairy, thinking they will be like other families before. She does not know how to swim, which is unfortunate when she falls out of the boat on a rafting trip, although she knows basic CPR, which she uses to revive Tiller after his heart attack.

Sairy: Sairy is an old woman who lives in Ruby Holler with her husband. She is very kind and compassionate, especially with children. She also is very trusting. Her dream is to have another adventure before she dies. She once lived in New York City, and Tiller wrote to her every week from Ruby Holler. Eventually she left the city and married Tiller. She has four children that are adults and have left Ruby Holler.

Tiller: Tiller is Sairy's cranky husband. He is about her age and, unlike her, is distrusting and doubtful, much like Florida. He was born on a houseboat and then lived in Ruby Holler all his life. When all his children left, he planted a tree in their memory, but it is accidentally chopped down by Dallas and Florida. His plan is to build a boat with Florida and take a rafting trip down a river. During the trip, the boat falls over in rough waters and he suffers a heart attack, although he eventually recovers.

Z: Z (whose full name is never revealed) is Tiller and Sairy's neighbor. He's described as a shady figure who helps Mr. Trepid find the understone funds in exchange for a large amount of money. He is not very responsible, but he easily learns helpful information. He helps the Ruby Holler family prepare for their trips, during which he learns that Dallas and Florida are his children. He is very good friends with Tiller and Sairy and helpful to them.

Mr Trepid: Mr. Trepid co-runs the Boxton Creek Home with his wife and assistant. He is very strict, posting rules in every room of the house and punishing the children who break the rules with chores or time in the basement "thinking corner." He is also greedy, dreaming of expensive luxuries and an easy life. When he hears about Tiller and Sairy's understone funds, he hires Z to help him find the money.

Mrs Trepid: Mrs. Trepid is Mr. Trepid's wife, who also runs the orphanage. Like her husband, she is strict with children and dreams about an easier life. She often claims to suffer from constant migraines and is suspicious of her husband's actions to earn more money.

== Reception ==
In a contemporary review for The Guardian, Philip Pullman remarked on Ruby Holler's "larger-than-life, brighter-than-natural quality" and concluded that while neither great literature nor the author's best work, "it's a book that shows how very satisfying unobtrusive craftsmanship can be, even working with slight materials, and it's fun, and it celebrates kindness and decency." Regarding the main plot line, he observed that "it's not hard to predict that there will be problems to overcome and dangers to face, but that they'll all live happily ever after." Creech makes it work for all kinds of readers by "a complete certainty of tone" and by "putting the camera in the right place". In particular, and unusually for a children's book, she "distributes her attention equally among the adults and the children. She looks at whatever is interesting, whatever moves the story forward, and tells us what she sees, and never tells us more than we need."

Creech traveled to London for five days in July 2003 to receive the Carnegie Medal. Concluding online coverage for The Guardian, Dina Rabinovitch called Ruby Holler "an old-fashioned tale of two children in peril rescued by the wisdom of two old folk. What sets it apart is Creech's typical lightness of touch; the glancing way she writes means you barely realise that, even in this solid love story of older folk, the wife is less sure of marriage than the man."

== Notes ==
Awards
Preceded by The Amazing Maurice and his Educated Rodents	Carnegie Medal recipient 2002	Succeeded by A Gathering Light
