= Linden Dalecki =

American author

- Born: December 23, 1968 (age 57); Neptune, New Jersey, U.S.
- Occupations: Author of novels and short stories
- Writing career
- Genres: Children's books, Young adult, novels
- Notable work: Kid B

Linden Dalecki (born December 23, 1968) is an American author. He writes novels for children and young adults.

== Writing ==
His first novel, Kid B (2006), is set in the world of Texas hip-hop and was influenced by S. E. Hinton's The Outsiders. The book is narrated in the first-person by the title character "Kid B" whose birth name is Breslin Kirwin.

By following two conflicting groups of teen boys, the themes explored by Dalecki are similar to those in The Outsiders (1967), such as brotherly love (or hate as the case may be), friendship, and coming-of-age. But unlike The Outsiders, in the milieu of Kid B the groups are from similar socio-economic backgrounds (the working class) and though there is some gang activity most of the conflict revolves around breakdance competition and other aspects of hip hop.

Kid B evolved from Dalecki's award-winning short story, "The B-Boys of Beaumont".
