= The Wanderer (Creech novel) =

Novel by Sharon Creech

- First edition
- Illustrator: David Diaz
- Language: English
- Genre: Children novel
- Publisher: Joanna Cotler
- Publication date: 2000
- Publication place: United States
- Media type: Print (Hardback & Paperback)
- Pages: 305
- ISBN: 9780439316293
- OCLC: 48069938

The Wanderer is a children's novel by Sharon Creech, published in 2000. It was shortlisted for the Carnegie Medal and named a Newbery Honor book.

== Plot overview ==
Sophie, a 13-year-old girl with two non-biological parents, is the only girl amongst a crew of her three uncles (Dock, Mo, & Stew) and her two cousins (Brian & Cody) sailing across the Atlantic Ocean to visit their grandpa, Bompie, who lives in England. The story is told from her point-of-view and also from Cody's. The family sails from Virginia to Ireland on Dock's sailboat, the Wanderer. During the first part of the trip, the Wanderer stops at Block Island, Martha's Vineyard, and Grand Manan, and then makes the long and treacherous journey to Ireland. Through the journey, Sophie learns to accept who she is and gets to know a lot about her relatives, which creates bonds among them all, especially Cody and Uncle Dock. Cody, who often jokes around and is perceived as unserious, learns he is capable of more than he thought, and heals his relationship with his father. Having previously suppressed memories of her traumatic childhood and the death of her biological parents, Sophie eventually comes to understand that she is allowed to express her feelings, integrate her memories into her life, and rely on her adoptive family. When they land in England, Sophie meets Bompie for the first time.
