= Mike Mullin (author) =

American young adult fiction writer

Mike Mullin is primarily known as a young adult fiction writer. His debut novel, Ashfall (2011), is the first of a series dealing with the aftermath of the eruption of the Yellowstone supervolcano. Mike's latest young adult novel Surface Tension (2018) is a domestic terrorism thriller.

== Personal life ==
Mike holds a black belt in Songahm Taekwondo. He lives in Indiana with his wife, Margaret and their multiple cats.

== Reception ==
His debut novel, Ashfall, was named one of the top five young adult novels of 2011 by National Public Radio, a Best Teen Book of 2011 by Kirkus Reviews, and a New Voices selection by the American Booksellers Association.

He is represented by Kate Testerman of KT Literary.

== Bibliography ==
=== Ashfall series ===
- Ashfall (2011)
- Ashen Winter (2012)
- Darla's Story (2013)
- Sunrise (2014)

=== Other novels ===
- Surface Tension (2018)
