= Walk Two Moons =

1994 novel by Sharon Creech

- First edition
- Author: Sharon Creech
- Language: English
- Genre: Young adult fiction, adventure, realistic fiction
- Publication date: June 12, 1994
- Publication place: United States
- Media type: Print (Hardcover, Paperback)
- Pages: 185 pp (first edition, hardback)
- ISBN: 0-06-023334-6
- LC Class: PZ7.C8615 Wal 1994

Walk Two Moons is a novel written by Sharon Creech, published by HarperCollins in 1994 and winner of the 1995 Newbery Medal. The novel was originally intended as a follow-up to Creech's previous novel Absolutely Normal Chaos; but the idea was changed after she began writing it. The book is often taught in elementary and middle schools across the world since the book is considered a classic example of what it means to judge, come to terms with death, and connecting with the people who surround us.

== Plot ==
The novel is narrated by a 13-year-old girl named Salamanca Hiddle. She and her grandparents are from Bybanks, Kentucky, a fictional town based on Quincy, Kentucky, but they are currently renting a house in Euclid, Ohio.

To see her cousin and find herself, Sal's mother, Chanhassen "Sugar" Pickford-Hiddle has recently left Sal's father, and Sal's grandparents are taking her on a cross-country road trip to Lewiston, Idaho to see her. Sal loves nature and was very close to her mother before she left.

On the trip, Sal entertains her grandparents by telling a story about her friend in Euclid, Ohio, Phoebe Winterbottom, whose mother suddenly disappeared and left their family too, and about Ben Finney, with whom Sal begins a romantic relationship. Throughout the book, as Sal's story unfolds and their car travels west, she reveals more details about Phoebe, and why her story reminds Salamanca of her own.

The more she tells her grandparents of Phoebe's story, the more she feels like her story is less connected to Phoebe's story. When Sal reaches the Missouri River, her grandmother, or referred to as Gram, is bitten by a Cottonmouth snake.

Sal reaches Coeur d'Alene while Gram suffers a stroke and has to stay in a hospital. Gramps wants to stay with Gram, but having already taught Sal to drive on their farm, he gives her the car keys so she can reach her mother in Lewiston.

After a tense four-hour drive along a winding road, Sal reaches Lewiston and visits her mother's grave, finally coming to terms with her mother's death in a bus crash over a year ago.

When she gets back, it is revealed that Gram has died. At the end of the novel, Sal and her family move back to Bybanks and Sal mentions that their friends from Euclid are planning a visit.

== Themes ==
The major themes in the story include the development of new relationships, dealing with grief, love, death, cultural identity, women's roles as mothers and wives, the hardships of life, and the adventures of misunderstandings and coming to terms with reality. Creech drew on her background for many of the book's themes and images, including Sal's love of nature, her relationship with her mother, and the road trip to Idaho that frames the narrative. In an interview, Creech said that she found the aphorism that gives the book its title ("Don't judge a man until you've walked two moons in his moccasins") in a fortune cookie.

Sharon Creech is not indigenous, though she claims a vague, Native heritage. Indigenous Americans have expressed disappointment in the stereotypical and romanticized depiction of Native Americans in Walk Two Moons. Debbie Reese on Creech's authority to write about Indigenous Americans: "She's an outsider to Native culture, trying to write a story as if she's an insider. But her story is based on outsider's writings, and outsider's understandings, and it doesn't work... the Indian content doesn't really matter. It is simply a device, or, a decoration on a story about a young girl coming to terms with life and death."

Creech on her indigenous heritage and inspiration: "My cousins maintain that one of our ancestors was an American Indian. As a child, I loved that notion, and often exaggerated it by telling people that I was a full-blooded Indian. I inhaled Indian myths... I crept through the woods near our house, reenacting these myths, and wishing, wishing, for a pair of soft leather moccasins. (I admit --but without apology--that my view of American Indians was a romantic one.)"

== Awards ==
In 1995, Walk Two Moons won the Newbery Medal, the United Kingdom Reading Association Award, and the United Kingdom's Children's Book Award. In 1996, it received the WH Smith Mind-Boggling Book Award. In 1997, it also won the Literaturhaus Award, Austria, and the Young Adult Sequoyah Award.

Awards
Preceded by The Giver	Newbery Medal recipient 1995	Succeeded by The Midwife's Apprentice
