= Zindel =

Surname and first name list

Zindel is both a surname and a first name. Notable people with the name include:

- Bonnie Zindel, American psychotherapist and psychoanalyst
- Lizabeth Zindel, American writer, director and producer
- Paul Zindel (1936–2003), American playwright, young adult novelist and educator
- Tonia Maria Zindel (born 1972), Swiss actress
- Zindel Segal (born 1956), Canadian psychologist
