= The American Playwrights Theater: The One Acts =

Television series

The American Playwrights Theater: The One Acts is an American television anthology series. Anthony Quinn hosted four episodes that aired on the Arts and Entertainment Network from 1989 to 1990. Play titles were Third and Oak: The Pool Hall by Marsha Norman; The Rope (One-Act Play) by Eugene O'Neill; Let Me Hear You Whisper by Paul Zindel; and Twenty-seven Wagons Full of Cotton by Tennessee Williams.

Directors were George Schaefer, Fielder Cook, Lela Swift, and Don Scardino.

Many notable actors performed, including James Earl Jones, Lesley Ann Warren, Jose Ferrer, Elizabeth Ashley, Rue McClanahan, and Jean Stapleton.
