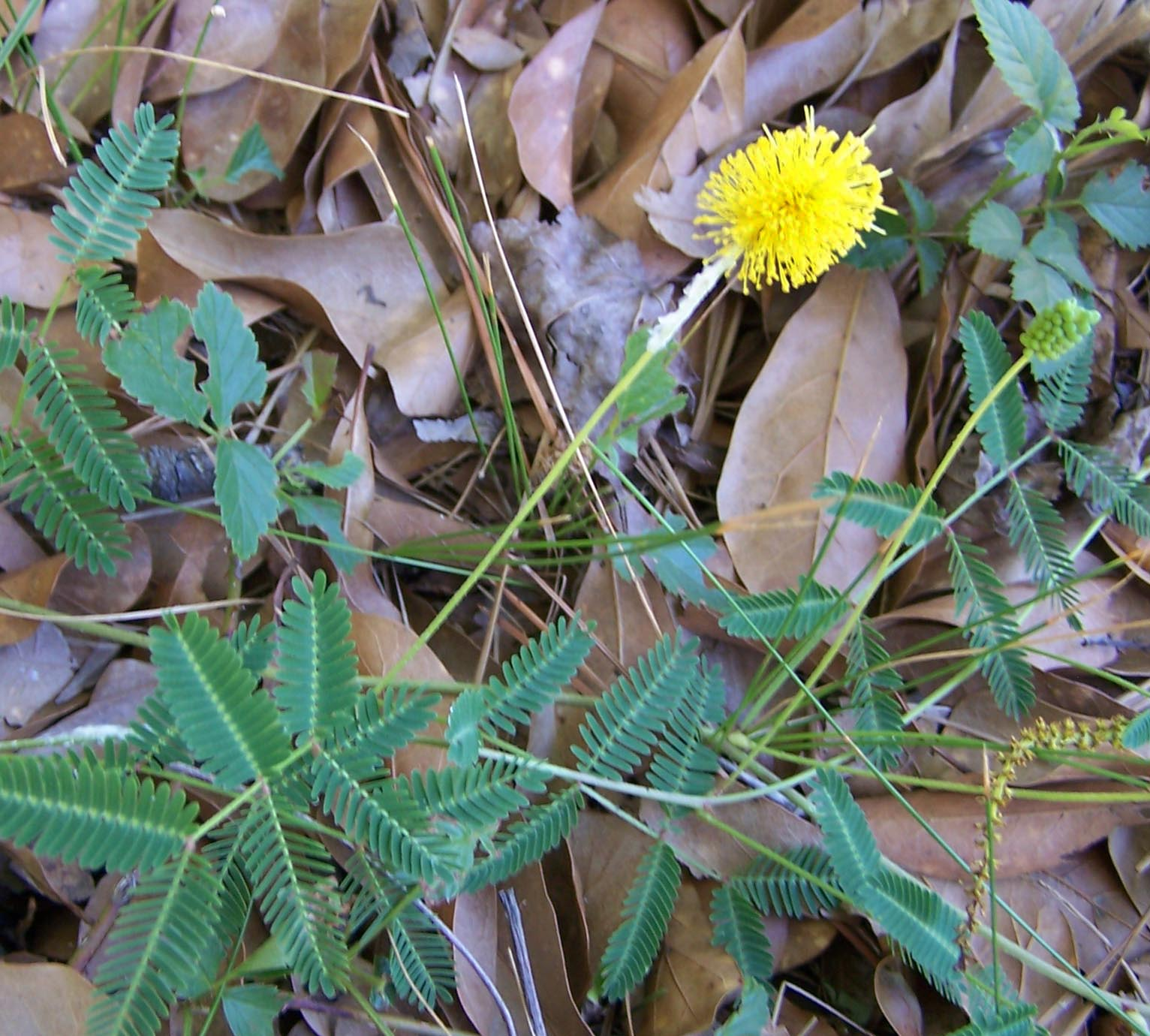
- Neptunia lutea

Scientific classification
- Kingdom: Plantae
- Clade: Tracheophytes
- Clade: Angiosperms
- Clade: Eudicots
- Clade: Rosids
- Order: Fabales
- Family: Fabaceae
- Subfamily: Caesalpinioideae
- Clade: Mimosoid clade
- Genus: Neptunia; Lour.

Synonyms
- Hemidesma Raf.

= Neptunia (plant) =

Genus of legumes

Neptunia is a genus of flowering plants in the family Fabaceae. It belongs to the mimosoid clade of the subfamily Caesalpinioideae.

== Accepted species ==
- Neptunia amplexicaulis Domin – Native to Queensland, Australia
- Neptunia dimorphantha Domin – Native from the Lesser Sunda Islands to Australia
- Neptunia gracilis Benth. – Native from Taiwan to Australia
- Neptunia javanica Miq. – Native to Indo-China and from Java to the Lesser Sunda Islands
- Neptunia lutea (Leavenw.) Benth. – Native to the US states of Texas, Alabama, and Oklahoma
- Neptunia major (Benth.) Windler – Native to northern Australia
- Neptunia monosperma F.Muell. ex Benth. – Native to northern Australia
- Neptunia oleracea Lour. – Native to the tropics and subtropics worldwide
- Neptunia plena (L.) Benth. – Native from the state of Texas and through to South America
- Neptunia pubescens Benth. – Native to North and South America
- Neptunia windleriana Santos-Silva & Mansano – Native to northeastern Brazil
