= Let Me Hear You Whisper =

Let Me Hear You Whisper may refer to:

- second line in chorus of 1910 American song "Let Me Call You Sweetheart"
- "Let Me Hear You Whisper" (song), internationally popular 1954 Samoan composition
- Let Me Hear You Whisper (NET Playhouse), 1969 American TV play by Paul Zindel
