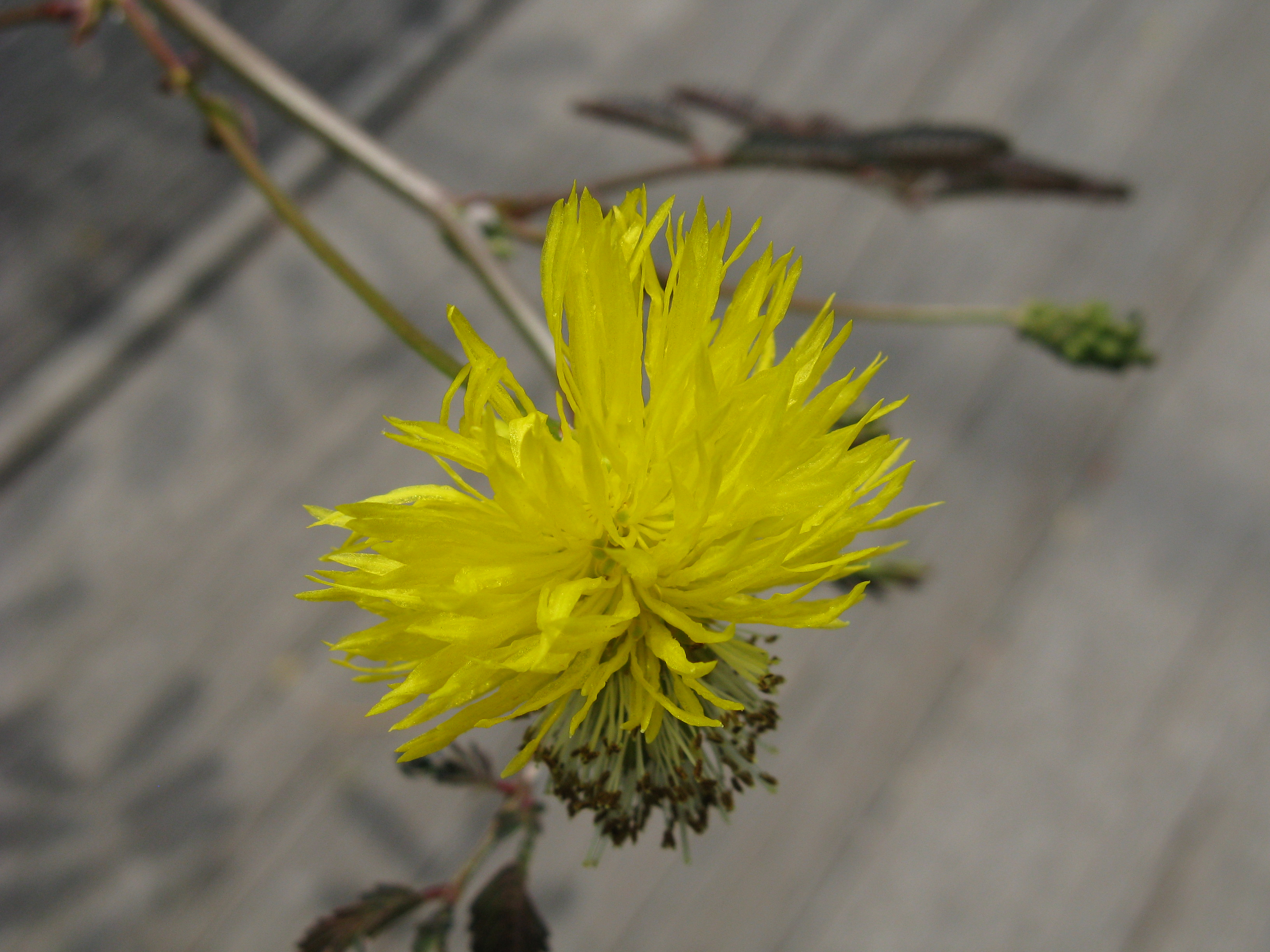

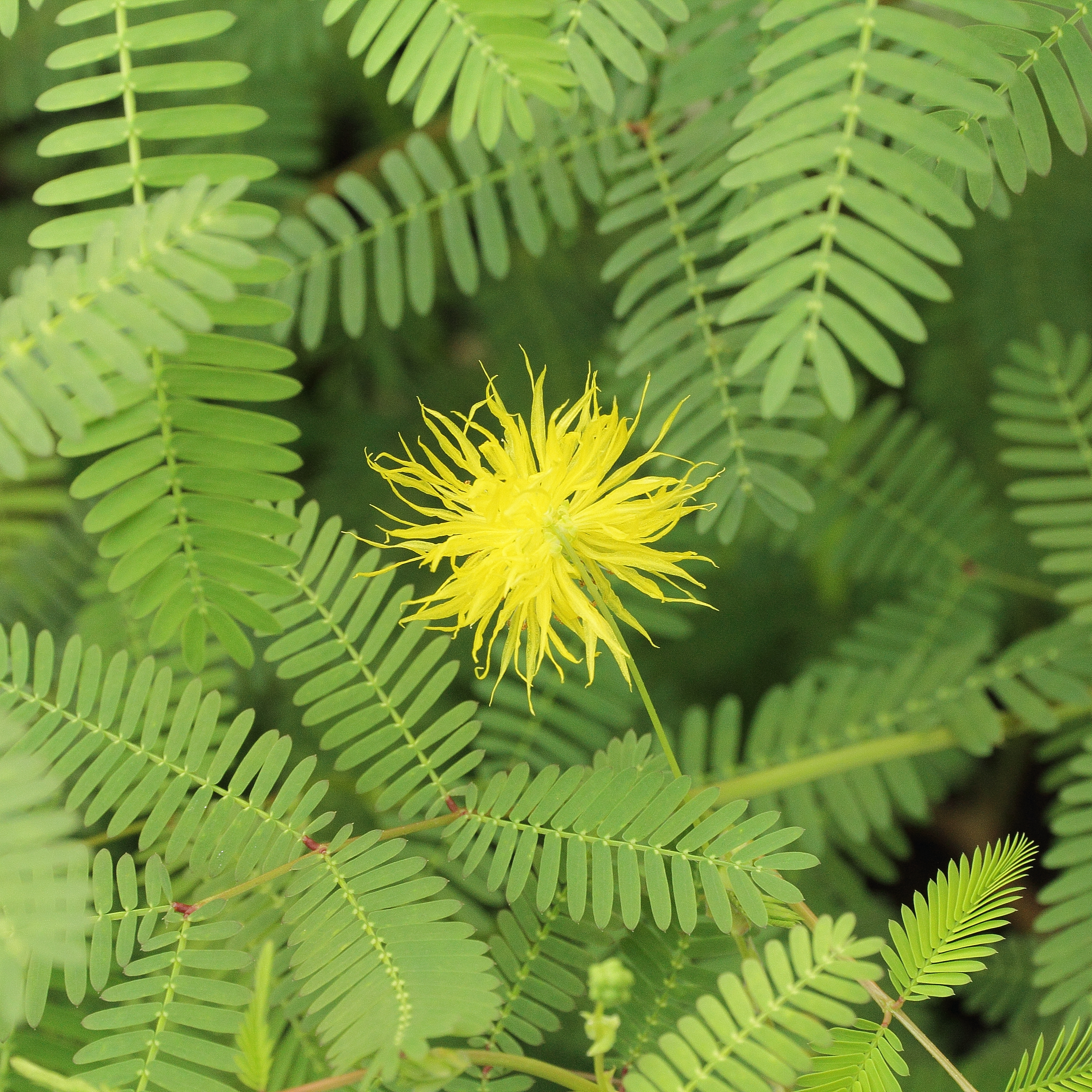

Conservation status
- Least Concern (IUCN 3.1)

Scientific classification
- Kingdom: Plantae
- Clade: Tracheophytes
- Clade: Angiosperms
- Clade: Eudicots
- Clade: Rosids
- Order: Fabales
- Family: Fabaceae
- Subfamily: Caesalpinioideae
- Clade: Mimosoid clade
- Genus: Neptunia
- Species: N. oleracea

Binomial name
- Neptunia oleracea Lour.

Synonyms
- List: Desmanthus natans Willd.; Mimosa natans Vahl; Neptunia natans W.Theob.; Acacia lacustris Desf.; Aeschynomene herbacea Aubl.; Aeschynomene pumila L.; Desmanthus lacustris (Bonpl.) Willd.; Desmanthus stolonifer DC.; Mimosa aquatica Humb. ex F.Dietr.; Mimosa aquatica Pers.; Mimosa lacustris Bonpl.; Mimosa stolonifera Perr. ex DC.; Neptunia stolonifera Guill. & Perr.

= Neptunia oleracea =

Species of flowering plant

Neptunia oleracea (not to be confused with Neptunia plena) is a species of flowering plant in the legume family, Fabaceae. It is sometimes referred to in English by the common names water mimosa or sensitive neptunia. It is pantropical nitrogen-fixing perennial legume. Genus and common name come from Neptune, god of the sea, in reference to the aquatic habit of some species in the genus.

Its specific epithet oleracea means "vegetable/herbal" in Latin and is a form of holeraceus (oleraceus).

== Description ==
Aerenchyma (white spongy air-conducting tissue that gives stems buoyancy) forms on stems floating in water, but does not form on stems growing on land. Plants typically grow to as much as 6" tall, but stems will spread in the water to 3-5' long. Stems are clad with bi-pinnate, fine, mimosa-like sensitive leaves that close up when touched. Primary leaf segments have 8-40 small oblong leaflets arranged in opposite pairs. Tiny greenish-yellow flowers are densely crowded into feathery orbicular inflorescences that bloom in summer. Fruits are flat pods (to 1-2" long). Floating aquatic plant stems often form thick foliage mats and is considered to be an invasive aquatic weed in some tropical waters where large mats may form that choke waterways, resulting in restricted water flow, reduced water quality, reduced fish activity and loss of some underwater and native wetland plants.

== Habitat ==
Primarily found growing prostrate in wet soils near the water's edge or floating on the water in relatively still-water areas.

== Uses ==
=== Culinary ===
This plant is cultivated as a vegetable in southeast Asia (leaves and shoots have cabbage-like flavor). Young ends of stems and pods are edible and usually eaten raw as a vegetable in Vietnam, Thailand, Laos and Cambodia and cultivated much like rice. The young leaves, shoot tips and young pods are usually eaten raw or in stir-fries and curries such as kaeng som.

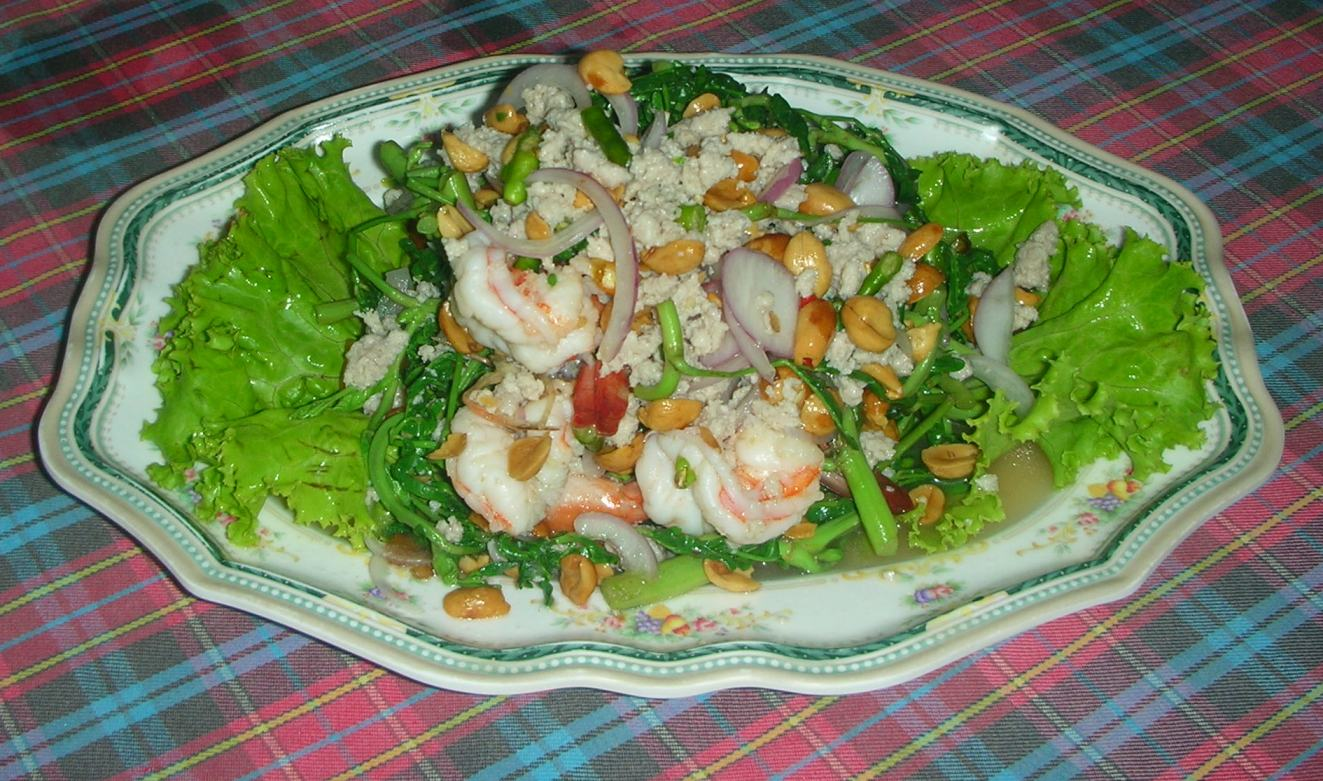
Yam phak krachet, a Thai salad made with cooked water mimosa

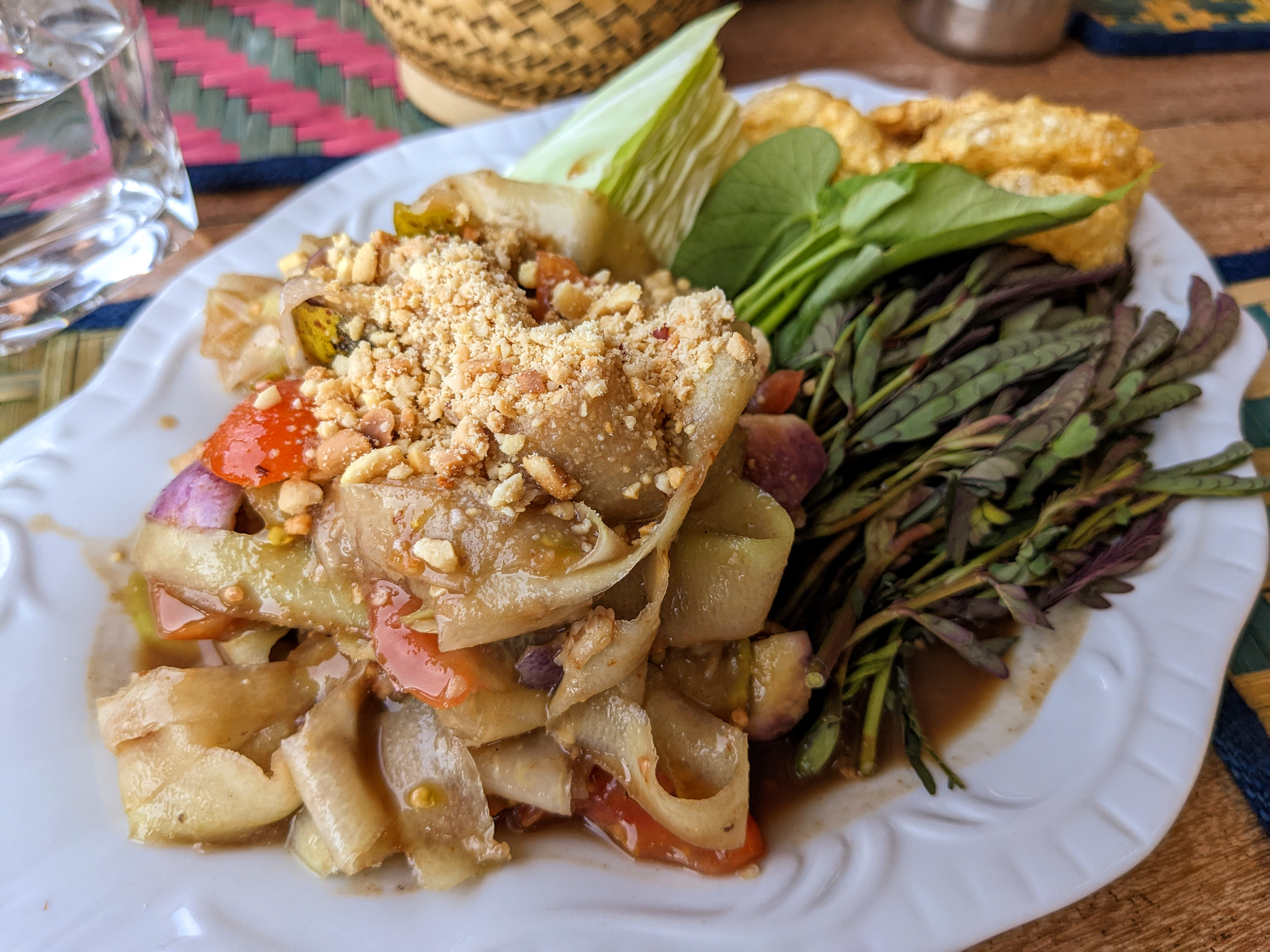
Lao-style green papaya salad (left) served with raw sprigs of water mimosa (right)

=== Medicinal ===
Juice of the stem and roots are used for medicinal purposes. Whole plant extract exhibited cytotoxic activity on neoplastic cell lines. Extract of the herb exhibited hepatoprotective activity.

== Common names ==
- Khmer: Kanchait (កញ្ឆែត)
- Meiteilon/Manipuri: Eshing ekai thabi
- Thai: Phak runon (ผักรู้นอน) or phak krachet (ผักกระเฉด), pronounced "phak kachēt".
- Vietnamese: Rau nhút
- Sinhalese: දිය නිදිකුම්බා
- Tamil language: Cuṇṭi or nīrc-cuṇṭi, referring to its sensitivity to touch (cuṇṭu: to tap with thumb or finger)
- Mon: Khamək (ခမက်)

== Gallery ==
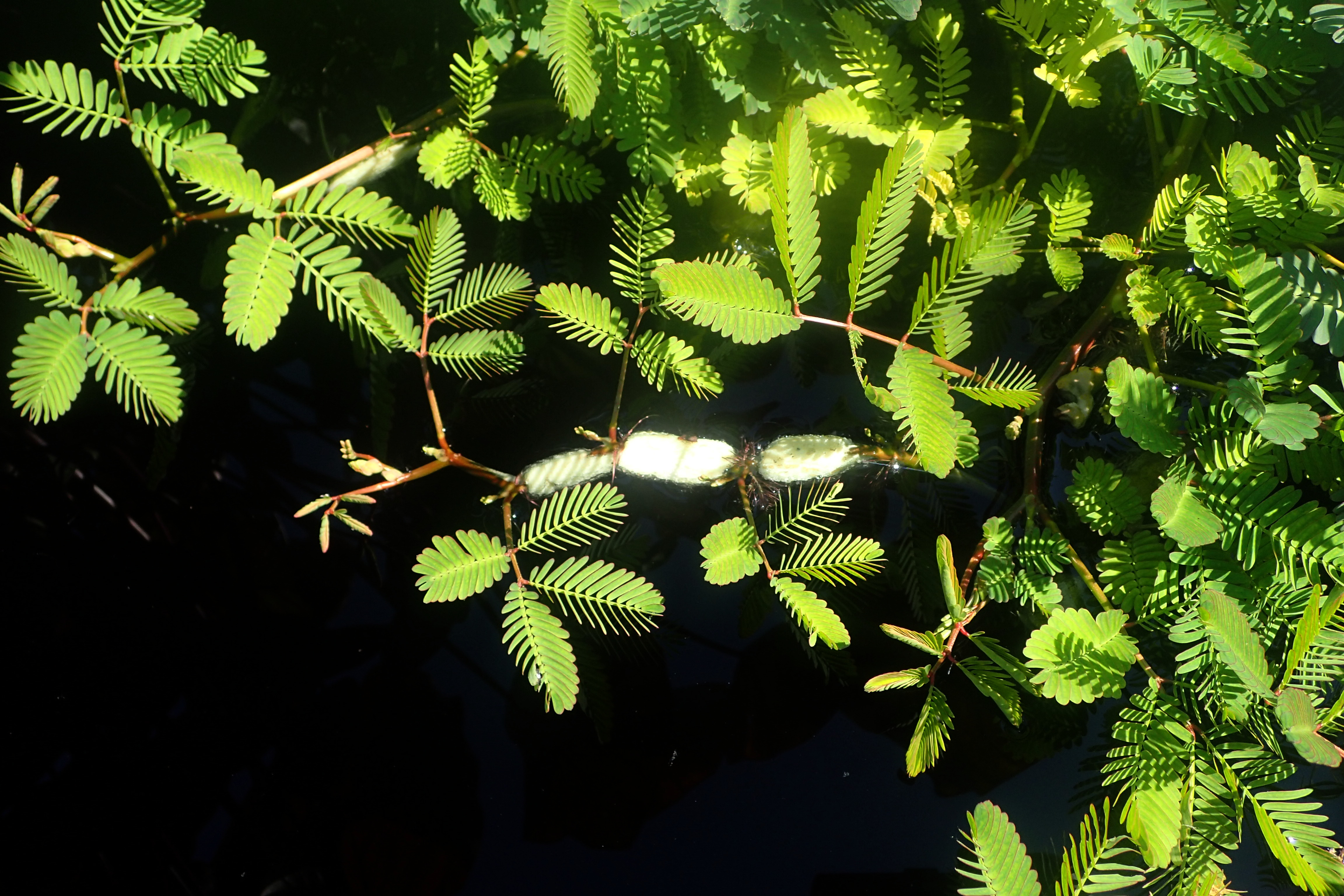

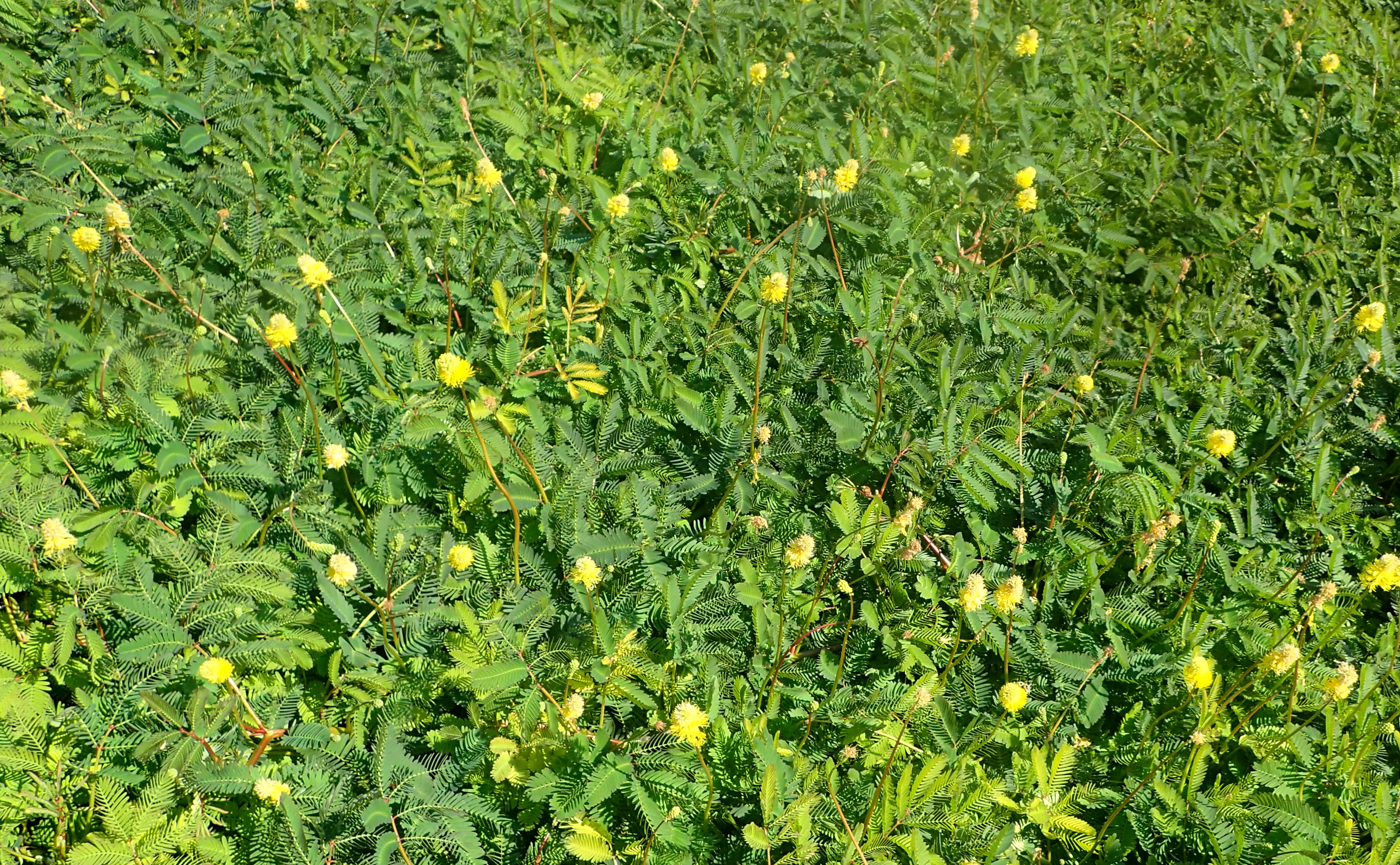

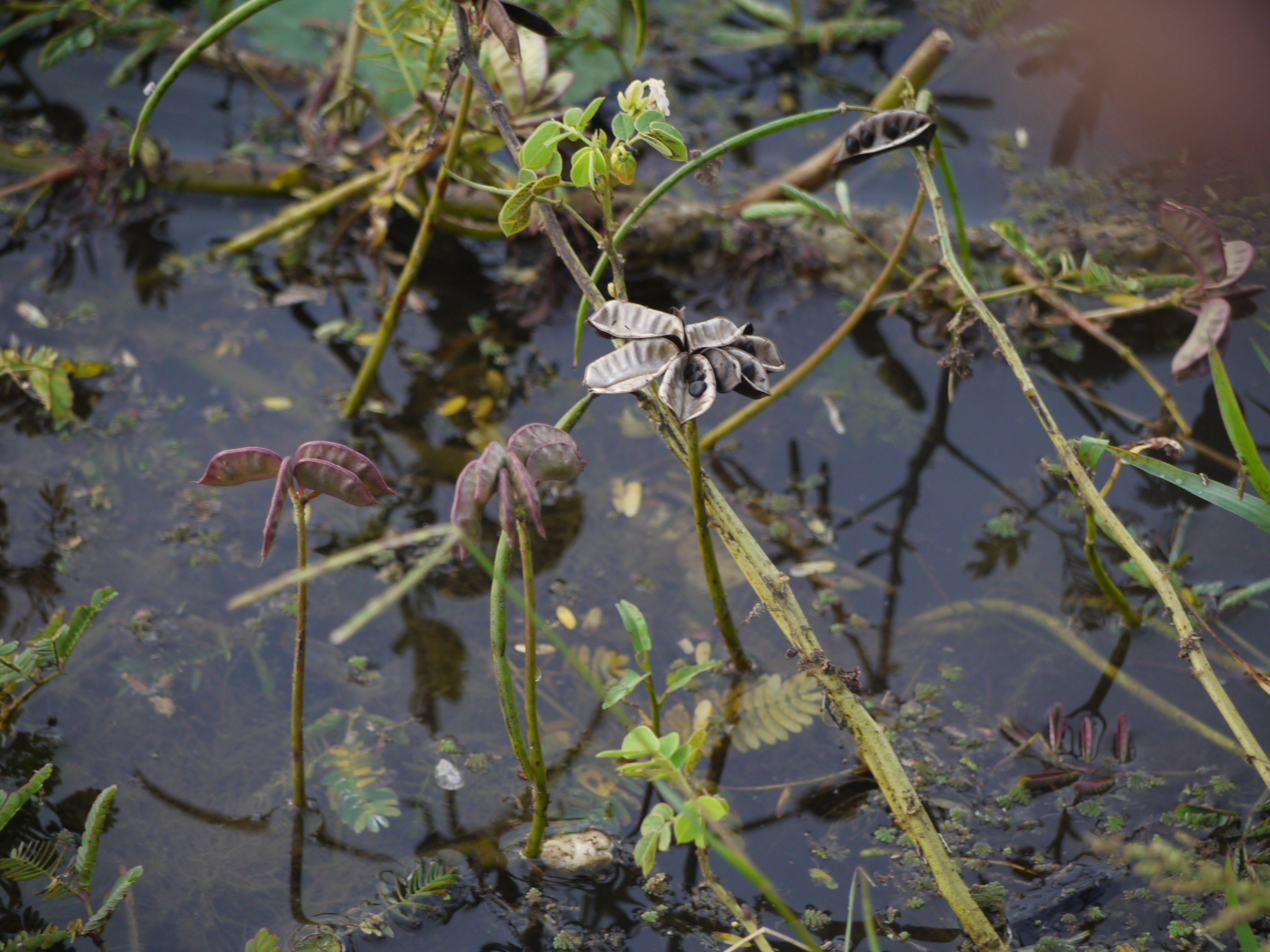

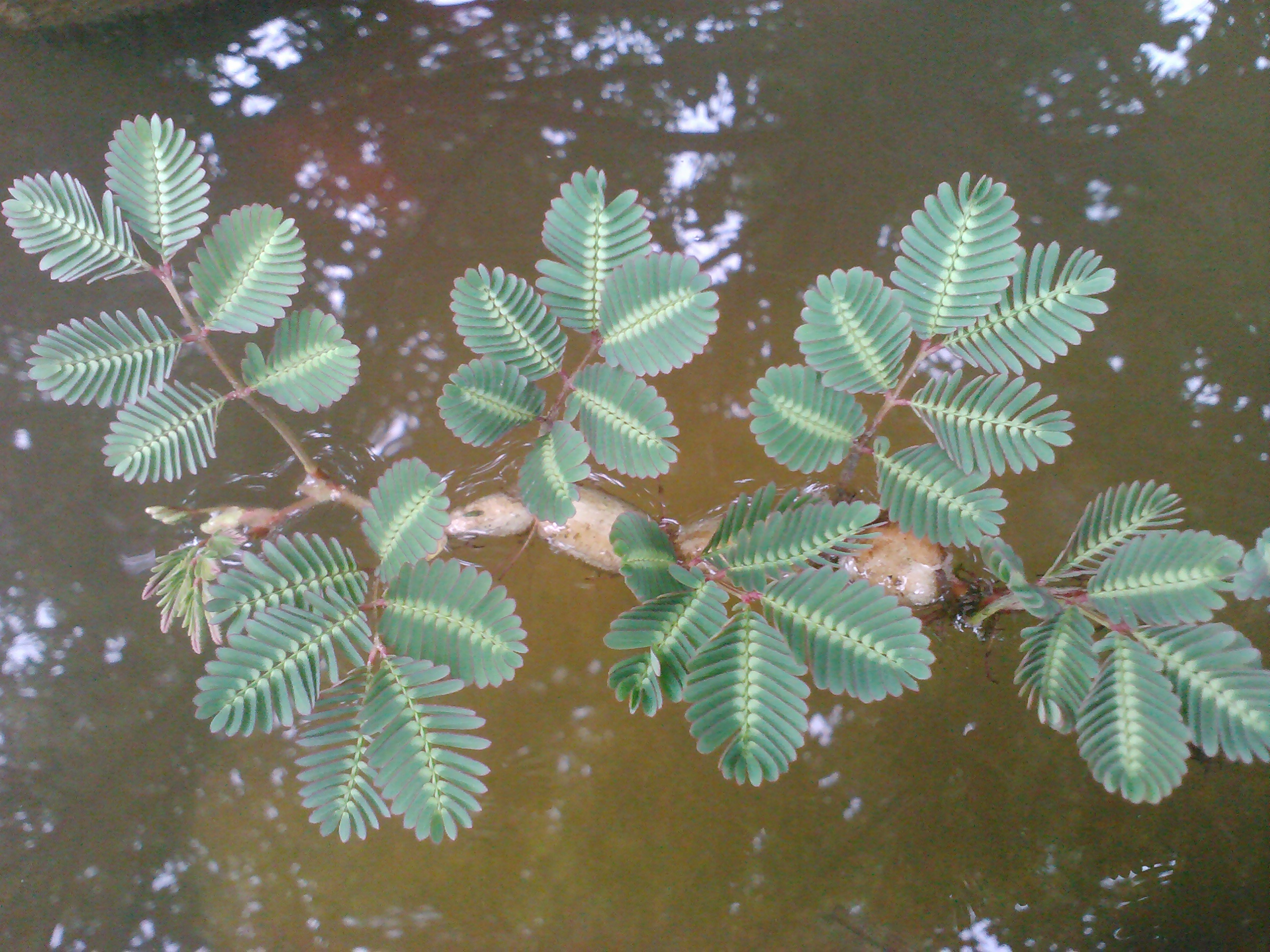

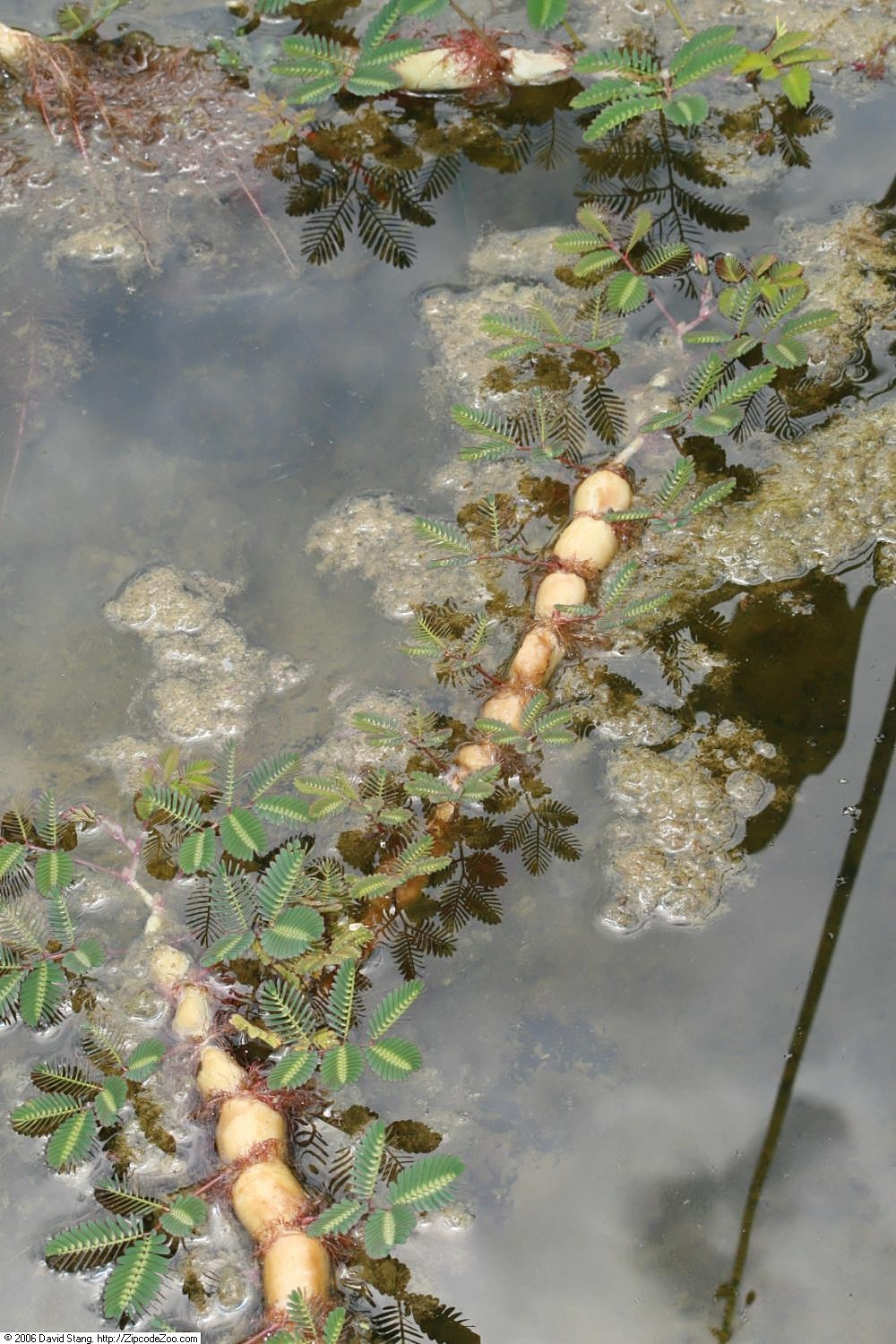

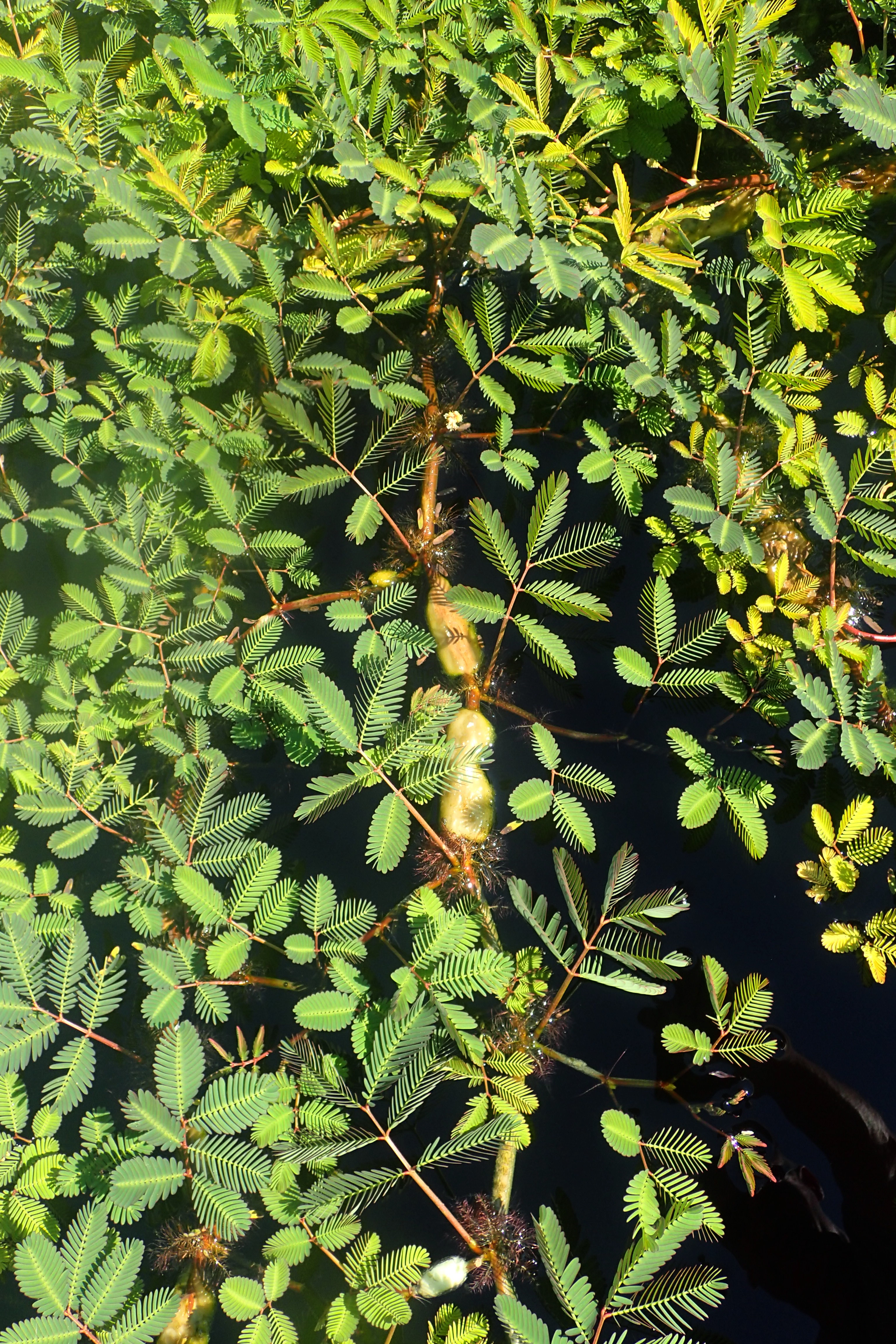

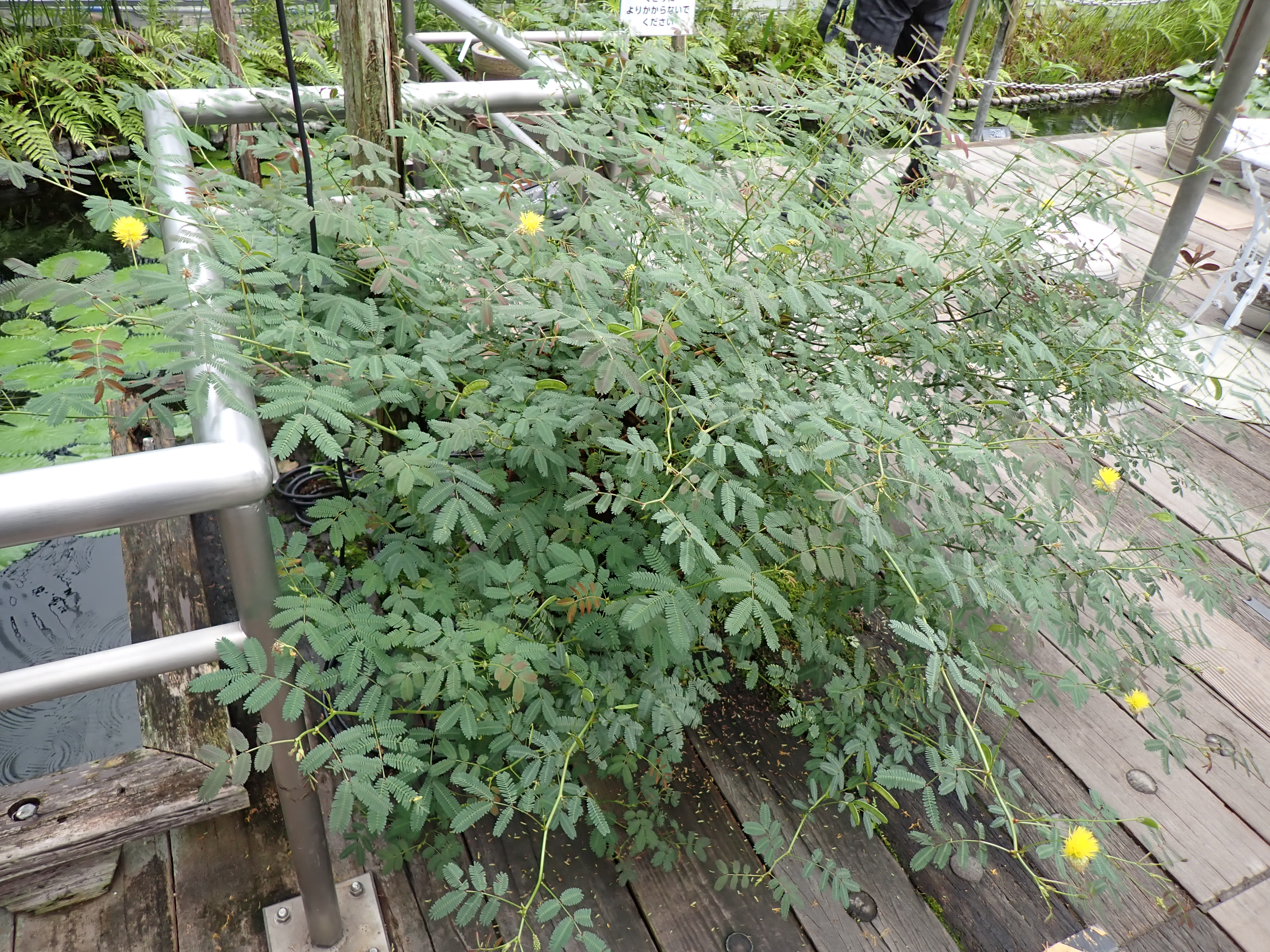

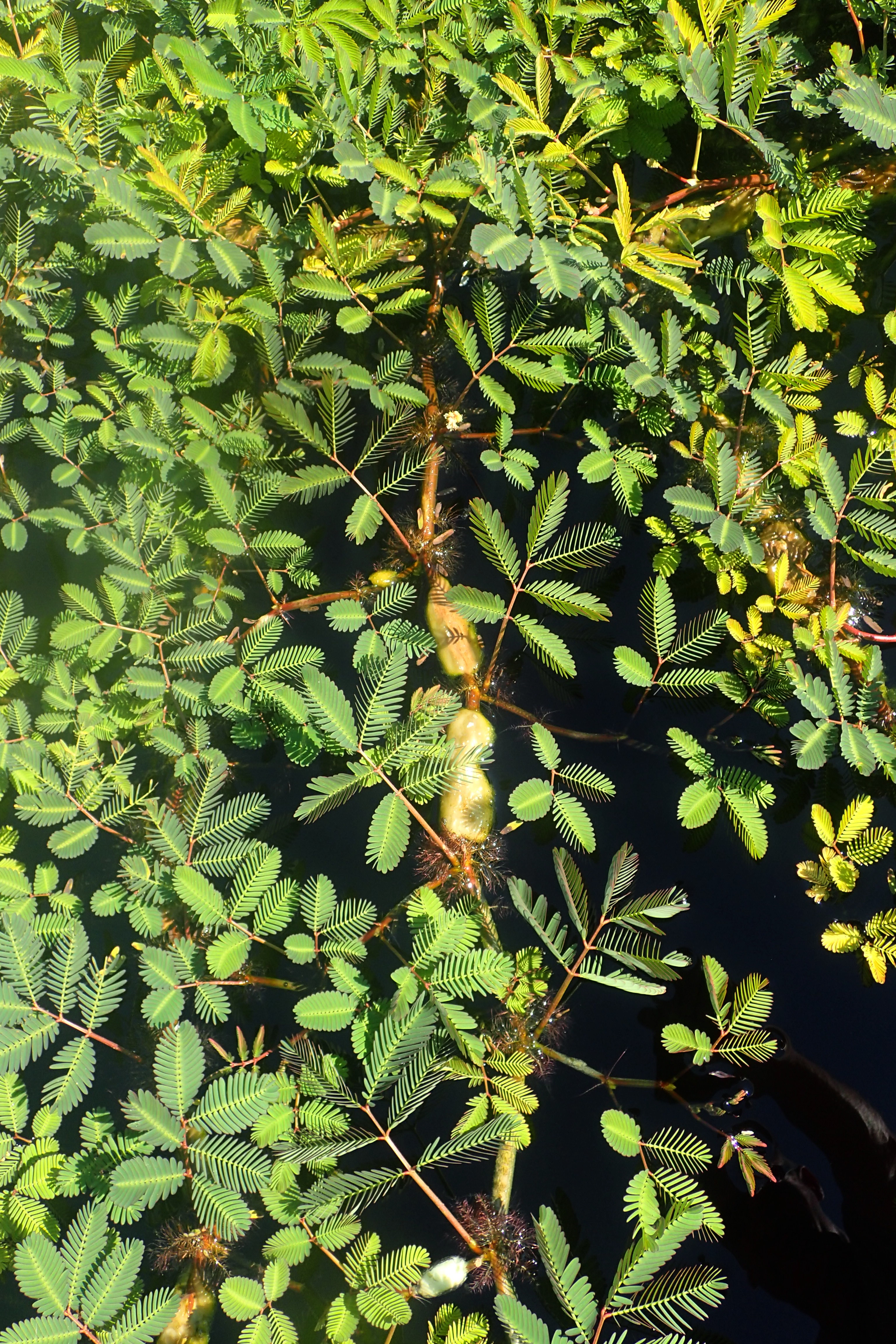

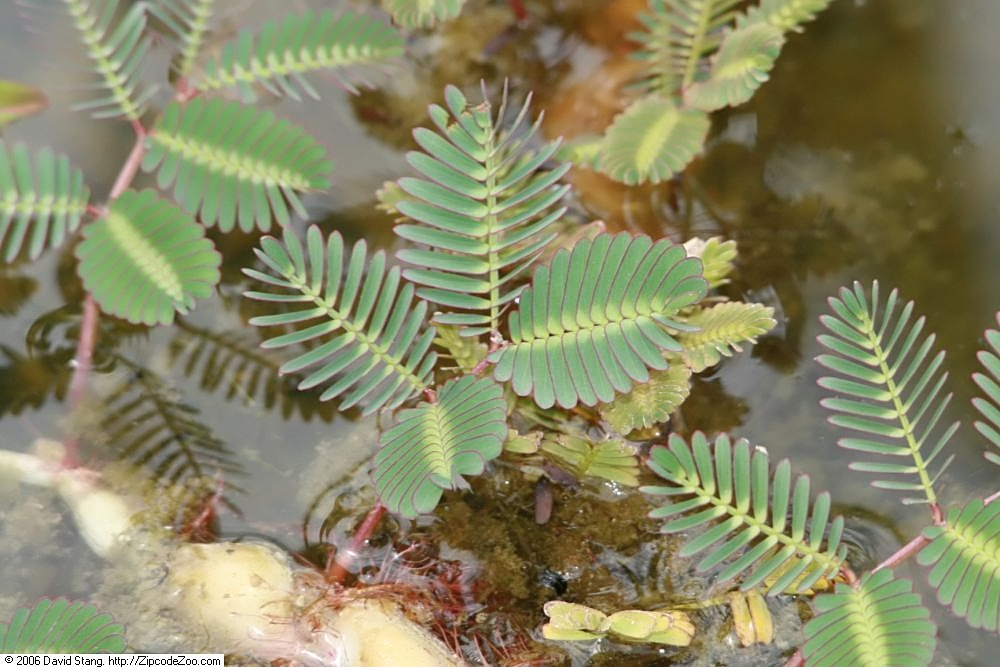

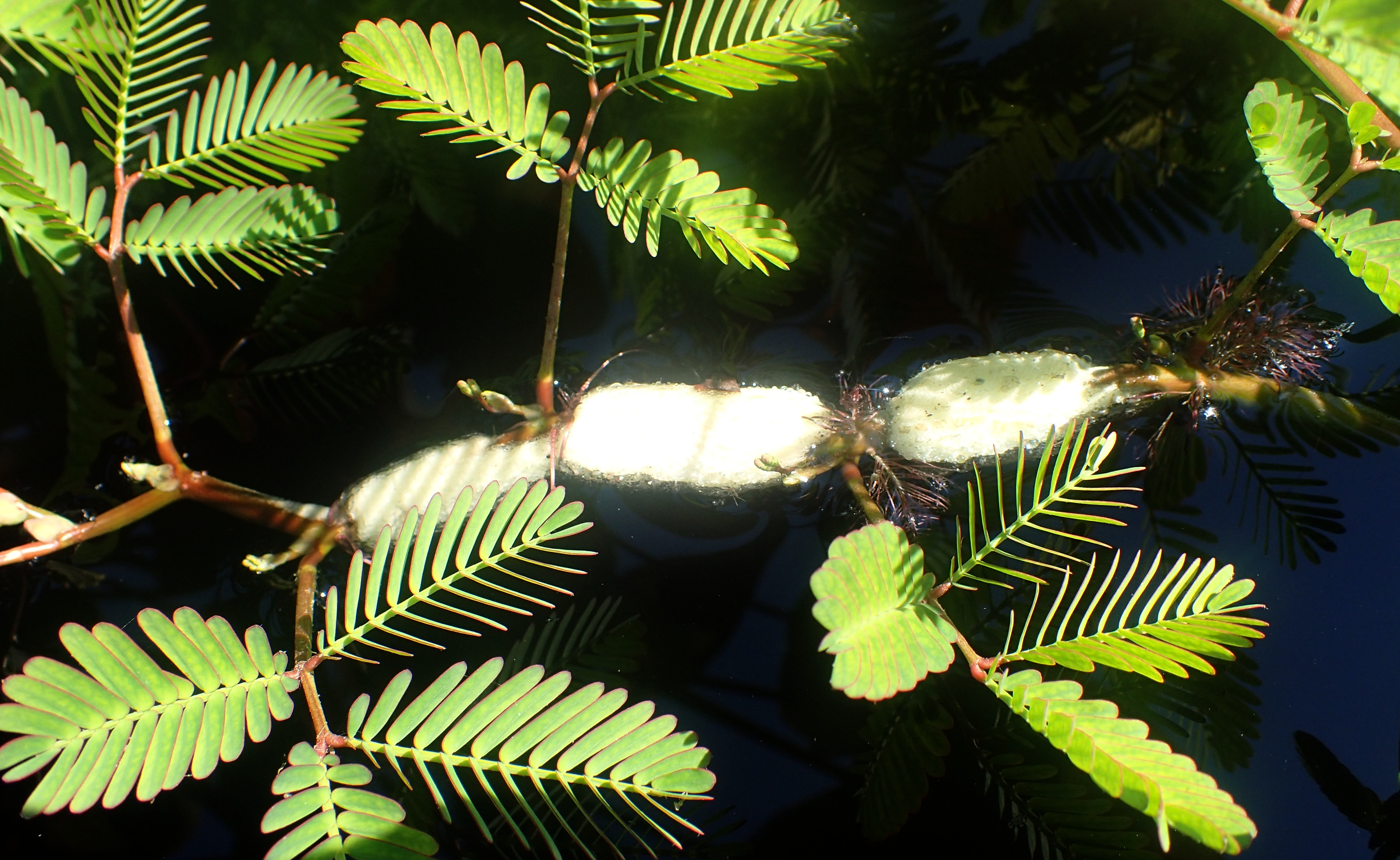
