= The Pigman's Legacy =

1980 novel by Paul Zindel

- First edition
- Author: Paul Zindel
- Language: English
- Genre: Young Adult literature
- Publisher: Harper and Row
- Publication date: 1980
- Publication place: United States
- Media type: Print (Hardback & Paperback)
- Pages: 115 pages
- ISBN: 978-0-06-075735-9
- OCLC: 58968588
- LC Class: CPB Box no. 2360 vol. 13
- Preceded by: The Pigman
- Followed by: The Pigman & Me

The Pigman's Legacy is a young adult novel written by Paul Zindel, first published in 1980. The book is a sequel to The Pigman following the lives of John and Lorraine shortly after The Pigman's death at the end of the first story and how they quickly make up for it.

== Plot summary ==
Just like the first book, the story is divided into chapters narrated by either John or Lorraine.

Taking place four months after The Pigman, this book involves the main characters, John and Lorraine once again. The beginning deals with the lives of the two after the Pigman's death and how it has affected them.

John and Lorraine are walking by the former residence of Mr. Pignati and discover an elderly gentleman apparently on the run from the IRS. He rejects their overtures of kindness and friendship and chases them off his property. Feeling that the Pigman has given them a chance to make things right once and for all, they befriend the senior, named Gus.

Gus tells the pair that he was a good friend of Colonel Parker Glenville, who was knighted by the King of Sweden for the subway system he designed for Stockholm. They lived in a townhouse in Stuyvesant. The Colonel was later run over by the train, according to Gus, and was apparently evicted. Gus asks the duo to help him retrieve a vital trunk he has left at the town-house. John and Lorraine later find a photo of Gus, who is revealed to be the bankrupt Colonel, Gus being the name of his German Shepherd who finds them at the townhouse and joins the trio. The Colonel later gets abdominal pains on the way back home and is rushed to the hospital. There, the duo learn that the Colonel has diverticulosis, which was aggravated by the fudge John and Lorraine gave him.

John and Lorraine try to help him again and introduce him to Dolly Racinski, the school cafeteria cleaning lady. Soon, the two senior citizens fall in love. One day, the teens and the seniors take a trip to Atlantic City, where John gambles away all of the Colonel's money. On the way back, the Colonel suffers another diverticulosis attack. He asks for Dolly's hand in marriage on his deathbed, and John and Lorraine travel to the convent across the street from the Pigman's house and get a priest to come to the hospital quickly and marry the senior sweethearts, which he does. After the wedding, the teens get Gus from the car, and run back up to the Colonel's room, only to find that he has died, leaving Dolly a bride and a widow all in the same night. It is revealed that the Colonel has undergone surgery a few times to correct his diverticulosis, but in vain. He ran away because he did not wish to die in a poorhouse.

After his death, John and Lorraine reflect on the Pigman's legacy: love.

== Characters ==
=== Main characters ===
- John Conlan
- Lorraine Jensen
- Colonel Parker Glenville ("reincarnated" pigman)
- Dolly Racinski
- Gus (the dog)

=== Other characters ===
- 'Bore' Conlan, John's father
- 'Old Lady Hyper' Conlan - John's mother
- Gus - A good friend of Colonel Parker Glenville, who is a German Shepherd

== Themes ==
The Pigman's Legacy explores themes related to friendship and love. Galang Reza, writing in the journal Lantern, describes two distinct unique friendships: the one between the main characters (John and Lorraine) and Mr. Pignati, as well as the friendship between the main characters and Glenville. Reza also points to the unique loves between the main characters, as well as the love between Glenville and Dolly.

John P. Martin, writing in Community Review, discussed how Zindel uses environmental to create a sense of outlandishness and isolation, which represents the characterization, as well. According to Martin, "hints of impending doom abound, alternating with references to physical menace and decrepitude".

The Pigman's Legacy also explores themes related to learning, such as how learning happens beyond the classroom and sometimes from people we wouldn't expect.

== Reception ==
The Pigman's Legacy received mixed reviews from critics.

Jean Duncan, writing in English Journal, called The Pigman's Legacy a "better than average" sequel, despite a preference for the original novel. Although Galang Reza praised the unique friendship and love highlighted in the novel, they found that the novel's plot could be confusing, with many events taking place in each chapter.

Kirkus Reviews provided a less positive review, stating that The Pigman's Legacy "begins badly by belaboring the meaning of the Pigman experience and ends badly in an orgy of predictable, corny clichés", though they concede that the novel has "its tender moments and whirlwind momentum".
