= Wendler =

Wendler may refer to:

- Wendler Arena, an ice rink which is part of the Dow Event Center in Saginaw, Michigan
- Wendler Middle School, in the Anchorage School District, Alaska
- Wendler (Karosseriebau, established 1840), car body manufacturers in Reutlingen, Germany

== People ==
- Adolph Christian Wendler (1734–1794), mayor of Leipzig
- Andy Wendler, founding member of the punk band Necros
- Anne-Kathrin "Anni" Wendler (born 1985), contestant on Germany's Next Topmodel, Cycle 2
- Christian Wendler (born 1989), German ice hockey goalie
- Edwin Wendler (born 1975), Austrian composer
- Frank Wendler, German motorcycle racer
- Franz Wendler (1913–2007), German glass artist
- Friedrich Moritz Wendler (1814–1872), German painter
- Hans Wendler (1905–1989), German steam locomotive engineer
- Hansi Wendler (1912–2010), German actress
- Herbert Wendler (1912–1998), German confectionery manufacturer
- Jack Wendler, art gallery owner
- Joachim Wendler (1939–1975), West German aquanaut
- Kurt Wendler (1893–1980), German graphic artist, painter and photographer
- Landon Wendler (born 2000), American freestyle skier
- Michael Wendler (born 1972), German singer
- Otto Bernhard Wendler (1895–1958), German educator and writer
- Paul H. Wendler (1917–2013), politician from Michigan
- Philipp Wendler (born 1991), Austrian footballer
- Richard Wendler (1898–1972), Nazi politician
- Walter Wendler, former chancellor of Southern Illinois University

== See also ==
- Windler, a surname
