= Windler =

Windler is a German surname. Notable people with the surname include:

- Dylan Windler (born 1996), American basketball player
- Milton Windler (1932-2026), NASA Flight Director

== See also ==
- Swindler (surname)
- Wendler (disambiguation)
- Zindler
