= Kaeng som =

Fish curry dish

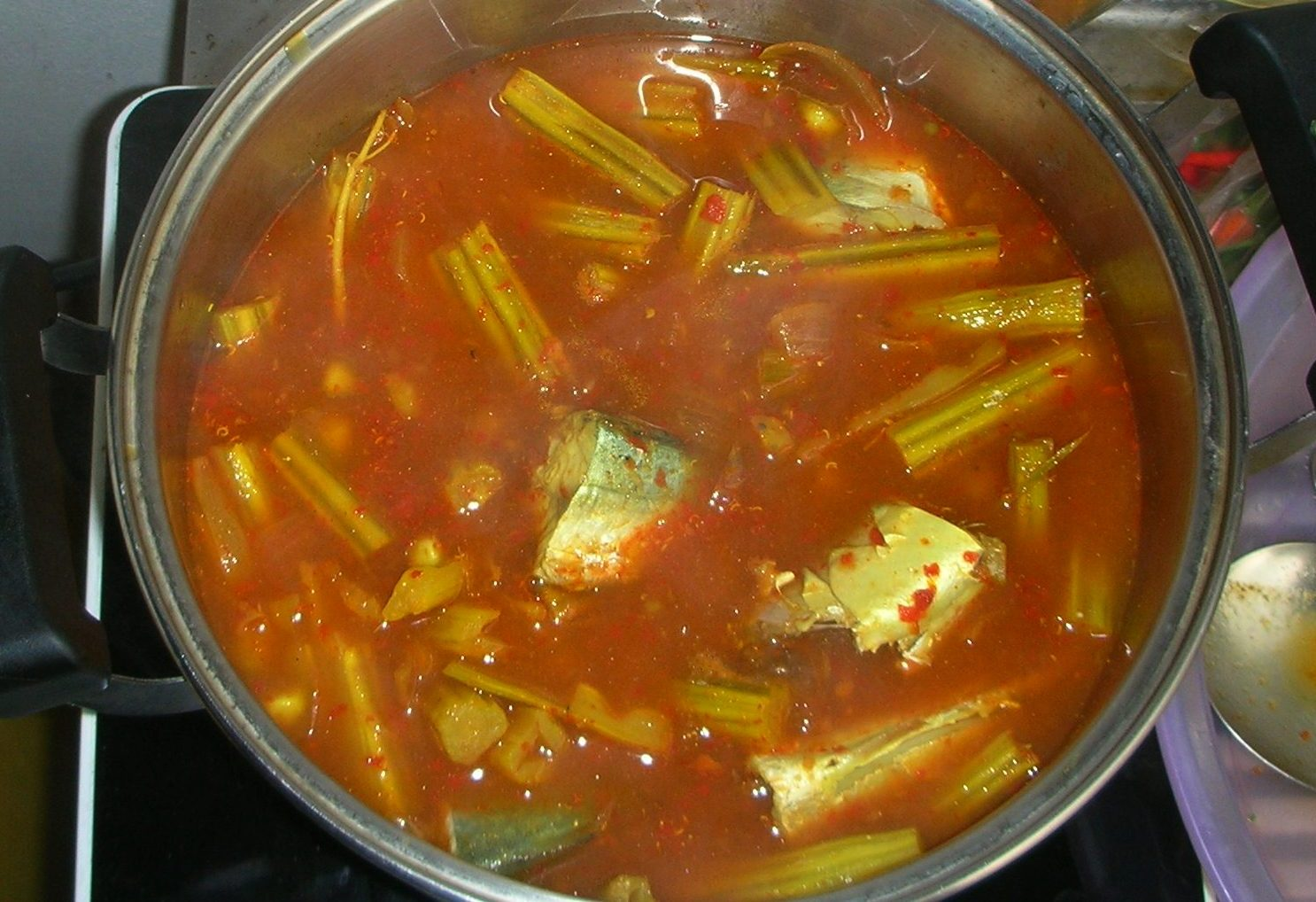
- Traditional kaeng som with drumstick pods
- Place of origin: Laos, Malaysia, Thailand
- Region or state: Central, Southern Thailand, Northern Malaysia, Laos
- Associated cuisine: Laos, Malaysia, Thailand
- Serving temperature: Hot
- Main ingredients: Fish and vegetables
- Variations: Lao Kaeng som, Malaysian Asam rebus, Thai Kaeng som
- Other information: Usually served with steamed rice

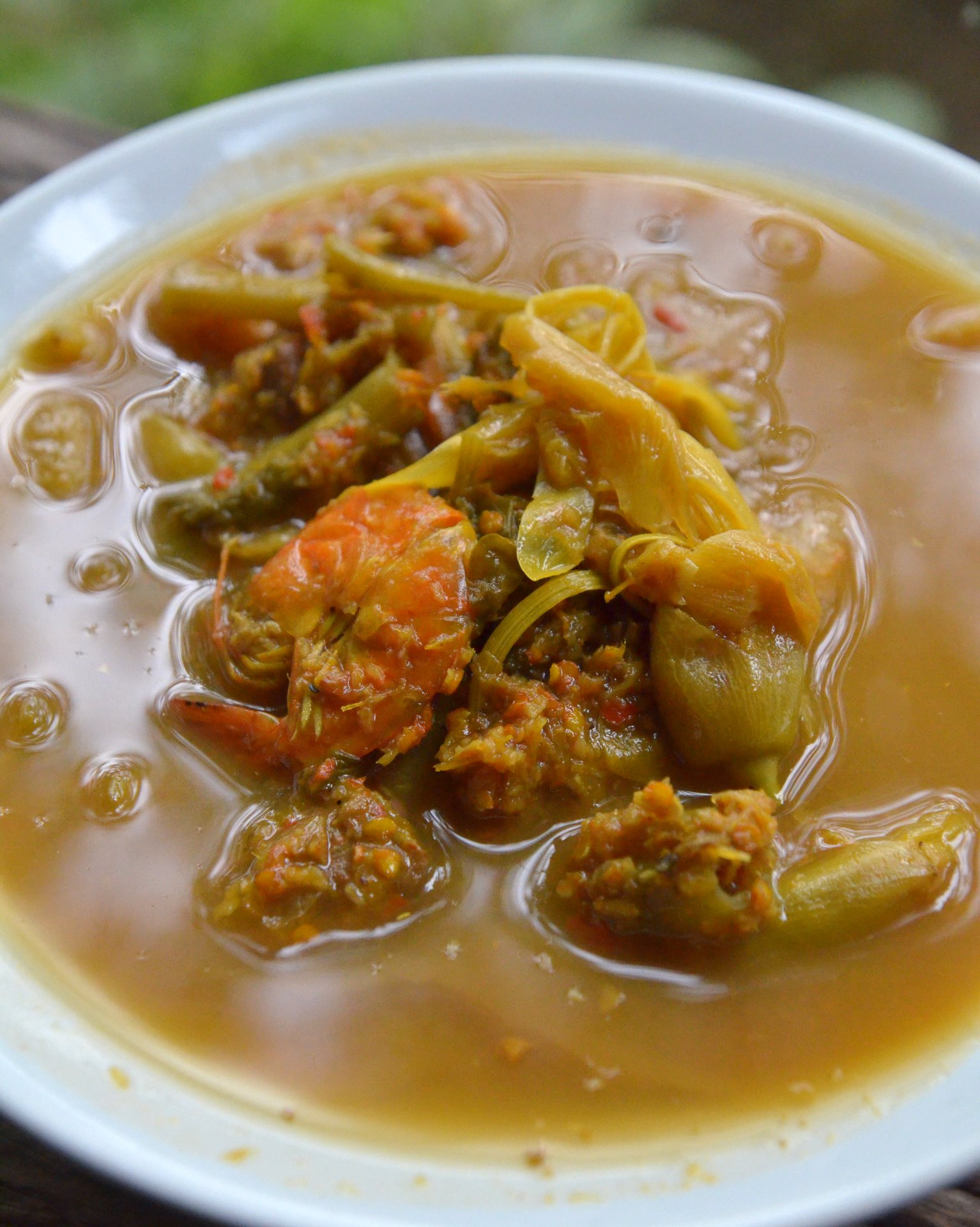
Kaeng som kung dok khae is a version with shrimps and dok khae, the flowers of the Sesbania grandiflora

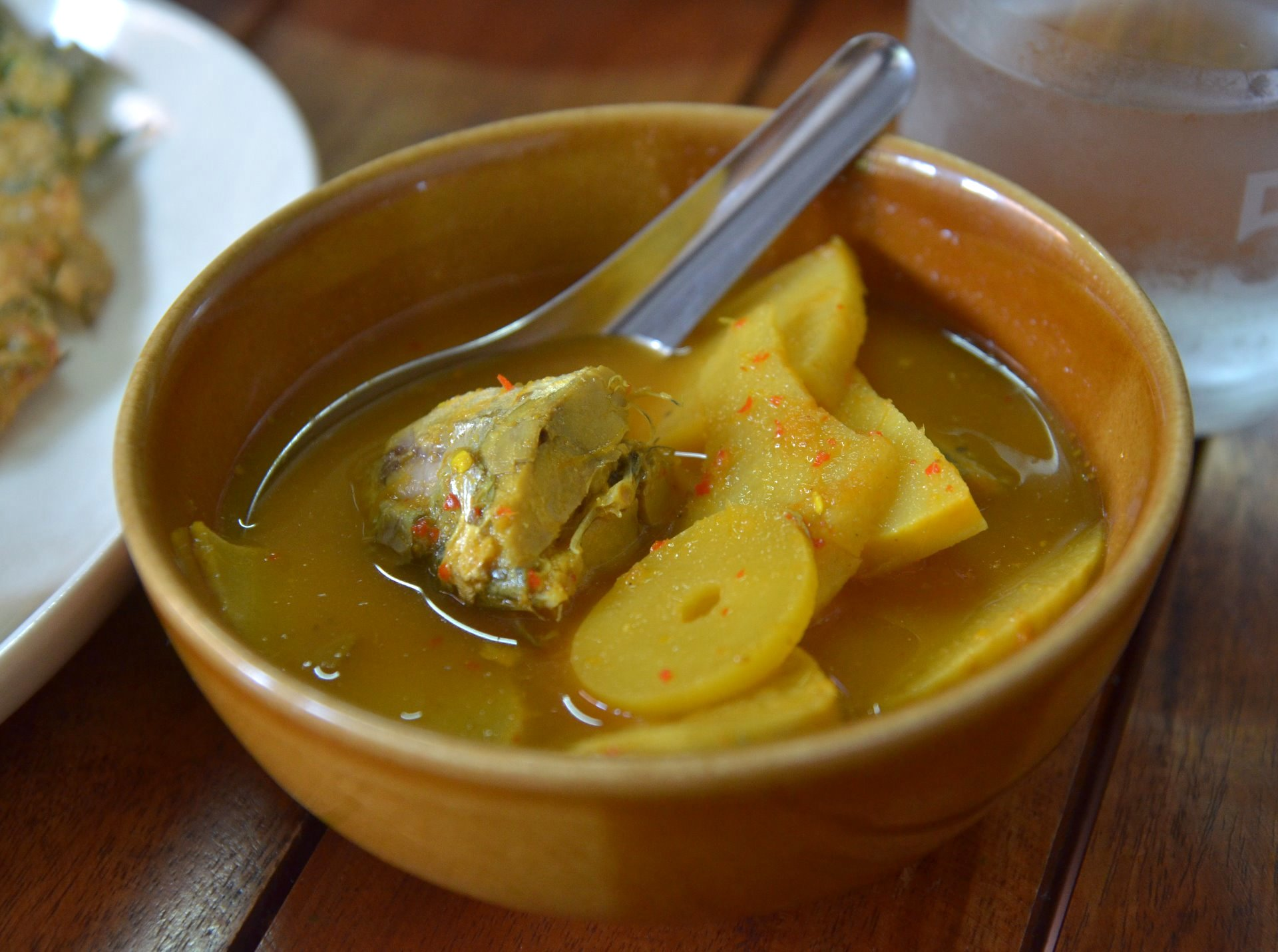
A traditional and basic kaeng som pla from Southern Thailand

Kaeng som, gaeng som (Thai: แกงส้ม, pronounced [kɛ̄ːŋ sôm]), Asam rebus, or Thai/Lao/Malaysian sour curry is a sour and spicy fish curry or soup with vegetables popular in Southeast Asia. The curry is characteristic for its sour taste, which comes from tamarind (makham). The recipe uses palm sugar (Thai: น้ำตาลปี๊บ, namtan pip) to sweeten the curry.

== Preparation ==
A paste called nam phrik kaeng som is prepared as a base for the curry, to which water and the ingredients are added. The preparation of this paste includes shrimp paste and shallots and all the ingredients are pounded with a mortar and pestle. This paste can be made from dry red chillies and one made from fresh red chillies. Some recipes state that large chillies should be used, others prefer bird's eye chilies.

Fish or shrimp may be used as the basic ingredient. Preferred fish are those that keep their consistency after boiling, such as Channa striata or other equivalent marine fish in coastal locations. One variant uses fish eggs. Kaeng som is usually served with steamed rice.

Traditional vegetables used in household preparation include drumstick pods (marum), green papaya, and Sesbania grandiflora flowers (dok khae), including the red variant of the flower in kaeng som dok khae daeng. Other locally available vegetables are used in the traditional versions such as Ipomoea aquatica (phak bung) and Neptunia oleracea (phak krachet).

== History ==
Following the popularization of the dish, currently the favored vegetables include cauliflower, daikon, cabbage, chinese cabbage, carrot, long beans and asparagus, as well as cha om omelet.

The versions using shrimp instead of fish are more popular; kaeng som with shrimp and cha-om omelet is now a standard dish in Thailand. Other types may include pineapple or seafood. The common point, however, is that coconut milk is not used in this sour curry.

Believed that this type of sour soup was developed from the ancient food since Ayutthaya period was called "Kaeng ngao ngod" (แกงเหงาหงอด). Which is a food that is similar to kaeng som today, assumed that it was adapted from the Portuguese soup by Maria Guyomar de Pinha, a Japanese-Portuguese-Bengali woman who was the chief of king's kitchen in the royal court of King Narai period.

== Variants ==
- Southern Thailand has its own sour curry, which is locally called kaeng som, but in the rest of Thailand is called kaeng lueang ("yellow curry") or kaeng som phak tai ("southern Thai kaeng som") to differentiate it from the central Thai kaeng som. It differs from the central Thai dish through its use of tamarind paste, assam fruit (som kaek) and lime juice to achieve the sourness, turmeric, which gives it a yellow color, garlic, shallots. The main characteristics of the southern variant is the use of turmeric and that it very spicy, sour and salty.
- In Kelantan, the Malaysian state adjacent to Thailand, the Kelantanese-Thai dish kaeng som no mai dong is a version of kaeng som with pickled bamboo.
- Lao cuisine has a dish called kaeng som with different ingredients; a version of it has pork and kaeng som pla is a fish soup that includes lemongrass and mushrooms.
- In Chonburi Province, a version of kaeng som is made using kaffir lime as the souring agent and Solanum aculeatissimum eggplants (Thai: มะเขือเปราะ; makhuea pro).
- In Prachuap Khiri Khan Province, there is a variant of the dish using fresh chili and Ocimum tenuiflorum (กะเพรา), a type of basil leaves.
- Kaeng som kai wan is a kind of kaeng som with chicken instead of fish.

== See also ==
- Asam pedas, the Malaysian-Indonesian variant of a sour, and spicy, fish-based stew
- Tom som
- Thai curry
- Thai cuisine
- List of soups
- List of Thai ingredients
- List of Thai dishes
- Yellow curry
