= Pardon Me, You're Stepping on My Eyeball! =

1976 young adult novel by Paul Zindel

Pardon Me, You’re Stepping on My Eyeball!
- First edition
- Author: Paul Zindel
- Language: English
- Genre: Young Adult literature
- Publisher: Harper Trophy
- Publication date: 1976
- Publication place: United States
- Media type: Print (Hardback & Paperback)
- Pages: 240 pages
- ISBN: 0-553-26690-X

Pardon Me, You're Stepping on My Eyeball! is a young adult novel written by Paul Zindel, first published in 1976.

The book follows Edna Shinglebox, a neurotic and prudish girl under the thumb of her controlling parents, and Marsh Mellow, an eccentric and intelligent rebel trying to cope with issues surrounding his father. Exploring themes of death, sex, romance, politics, friendship, psychiatric abuse, the death of a pet and alcoholism, the story brings Edna and Marsh together as friends, despite having no interest in sex at all (much to the chagrin of Edna's mother) after a series of strange events occur within their home community.

== Plot summary ==
Teens Edna Shinglebox and Louis "Marsh" Mellow both attend the same school in Staten Island, and are both struggling with family dysfunction. Edna has progressive but very overprotective parents who work at a flower shop and have a hobby of watching horror movies; they fixate obsessively, however, over Edna's lack of interest in boys and romance, thinking her to be a mentally ill prude who needs psychiatric attention. Marsh, meanwhile, is an eccentric, socially-aware and darkly humorous boy who keeps a pet racoon (simply named "Raccoon") in his pocket at school and consistently challenges authority. The teens are placed in a school "class" period with Mr. Meizner, a morbidly obese psychiatrist who means well but has trouble relating to the students due to his over-reliance on bizarre and novel psychological techniques. The class also contains an overtly effeminate cross-dressing boy who enjoys wearing his mother's clothing, a pair of twin sisters who still pee the bed, and Jacqueline, an older girl who works on the school newspaper with Edna, and who is Edna's only friend.

Marsh is drawn to Edna's unconventional quirkiness and decides to trust her with information about his family. According to a strange letter he slips her in class, his father, Peter "Paranoid Pete" Marsh is in a mental hospital in California and is set to be lobotomized soon against his will in an apparent government conspiracy. Edna finds the whole thing fake-sounding and stupid, but she agrees to speak to Marsh about it with the pretense of going on a date, which thrills her parents. She sees Marsh's home life for the first time; Marsh lives in a dilapidated pea-green house that is missing half its front porch, the house is described as smelling not bad, but "like dead mice", and Marsh's mother, Suzanne "Schizo Suzy" Mellow, is an apparent blackout drunk who is seen unconscious on the floor beneath the piano in her own vomit. Marsh reveals to Edna that his father is not truly insane, but was locked up because he knew too much about government corruption and was a nonconformist. Edna doubts the numerous letters that Marsh compels her to read, noting that the letters seem to share the same handwriting as Marsh himself uses, although she does learn that a story Marsh told her about having a large firecracker rocket under his bed, a gift from his father, is true.

Edna has a falling out with her mother and stands up for herself for the first time when her mother tries to force her to use a computer dating service. She also yells at Marsh and accuses him of lying about his father, which sends him into a screaming fit in the school cafeteria. The girl decides to learn more about Marsh's father and asks Mr. Meizer, who tells her that it's none of her business. She buses to Marsh's house instead that night and accidentally wakes up "Schizo Suzy", who playfully (and drunkenly) leads Edna upstairs to Marsh's bedroom, offering to introduce Edna to Marsh's "father", only to pull out an urn full of the deceased father's ashes from under the bed. The woman then chases Edna down the stairs and out of the house, shouting profanities and insults at her. Edna decides to visit a local "witch" and palm-reader, a middle-aged woman who wears revealing attire, keeps multiple pet dogs and is an apparent hoarder, for advice about the situation. The woman comes to insist that Edna and Marsh are destined to fall in love. (Edna finds the woman extremely creepy because she has live cockroaches crawling out of her cleavage and onto her face). Edna feels pity for Marsh and tries to make amends with him, but he ignores her. Jacqueline reveals that she's hosting a house party while her parents are away, and to annoy each other, Edna and Marsh deliberately each go there on their own. Marsh arrives with Nora Jean, a sexually-promiscuous classmate (to make Edna jealous), while Edna attends alone. Marsh also brings Raccoon in his pocket, as "Schizo Suzy" has a habit of deliberately killing any pet that he tries to keep in his room.

A drunken brawl breaks out at the party, and while the teens are all distracted by an injured Marsh and a group of bullies beating him up, a wax-dripping candelabra sets the house on fire. Edna and Marsh escape with the other teens from their class, but then Edna realizes that Raccoon is missing, and she shrieks at Marsh to alert him. Marsh tries to run back into the house to find his lost pet, but some teens detain him, leaving Edna to search instead. Much to her horror, she spots Raccoon trapped on the house's fourth floor balcony, which is surrounded by flames. She urges Raccoon to jump, but he doesn't understand her and instead panics while Edna watches him burn to death "until his body explode[s]". Horrified by the sight, she lies to Marsh about Raccoon's death with the claim that he simply ran off into the forest behind the house, giving Marsh the peace that at least his pet is alright. This leads Edna to consider that Marsh finds comfort in the fabrication of his father still being alive, even if it isn't true. Both teens run away from home and steal a vehicle, and Edna agrees to aid Marsh in breaking his father out of the mental hospital. Abusing caffeine pills to stay awake while driving, Marsh has a nervous breakdown, crashes the vehicle, helps Edna escape and retrieves his suitcase (Edna's suitcase is unable to be rescued and burns when the vehicle catches fire). The teens hide out in a cemetery where the grave of former American President John F. Kennedy is, and during this detour, they each compile a "hate list" of things they don't like. Edna is finally able to get Marsh to overcome his fantasy and admit that his father is dead - struck by a bus in California after wandering out into the road drunk. After this, Edna and Marsh bring Marsh's suitcase to a bridge, Marsh procures the urn with his father's ashes inside, they attach the urn to Marsh's firework rocket and they launch it into the air.

== Reception ==
Kirkus Reviews wrote in 1976, "Compared with Judith Guest's recent Ordinary People... this is a broader, outside view of teenage crazies, splashed with caricature and pointed distortion. But Zindel does involve you—breathlessly—in one bizarre, increasingly frenzied scene after another."
