= The Gadget (novel) =

Novel by Paul Zindel

- Book cover
- Author: Paul Zindel
- Language: English
- Series: The Zone Unknown
- Genre: Young adult, Historical novel
- Publisher: Random House
- Publication date: 2001
- Publication place: United States
- Media type: Print (Paperback)
- Pages: 197
- ISBN: 0-440-22951-0
- Preceded by: Night of the Bat

The Gadget is a young adult historical novel written by Paul Zindel published in 2001 by Random House. It is the final book of "The Zone Unknown" series. It tells the story of a 13-year-old boy named Stephen Orr, whose father is a physicist working on a covert project to develop the atomic bomb.

== Plot ==
Set in 1945, the story begins with a 13-year-old named Stephen Orr, who has just reached the gates of the top secret military base in Los Alamos, New Mexico. His father is a physicist there, working on making an atomic bomb. Stephen's father is not able to discuss the project in any detail but he and the other scientists with him seem worried about the project, which is codenamed "the gadget." Stephen and his new friend Alexei devise a plan to spy on his father and discover the truth about the project.
