= Reef of Death =

1998 novel by Paul Zindel

- First edition cover
- Author: Paul Zindel
- Language: English
- Series: The Zone Unknown
- Genre: Young adult fiction
- Publisher: HarperCollins
- Publication date: 1998
- Publication place: United States
- Media type: Print Hardcover/Paperback
- Pages: 192 pp
- ISBN: 0-7868-1309-1
- Preceded by: Rats
- Followed by: Night of the Bat

Reef of Death is a 1998 young adult novel by Paul Zindel published by HarperCollins and Hyperion and is the fifth book of "The Zone Unknown" series. Set in Australia, it is an adventure story with elements of horror.

== Plot ==
In the story, 17-year-old Peter Collins McPhee (nicknamed P.C. because he loves playing computer games) is called by his Uncle Cliff to solve a mystery in Australia. The brother of a young Aboriginal girl named Maruul has gone suddenly missing while searching for their tribe's treasure, told of in a riddle. She says there was a terrible screeching sound, and a boat came near just as her brother disappeared.

P.C. finds that there is a killer creature living in the depths of the reef. The creature attacks and kills his uncle. The two kids go to Wally Wallygong, an Aboriginal fishing shop owner, who explains the riddle. Afterwards, they all go to the reef location of the creature and pretend to be attacked by snakes. The strange ship that has been passing by takes them on board. They attempt to escape and are almost killed.

They find out that the captain of the ship, a geologist, has had the treasure—a carved opal wall—all along, and was making the screeching noise mechanically, which signalled the creature to attack. She also plans to destroy the treasure. P.C. tricks the creature into eating the captain, and Maruul returns to her village with the treasure. The village buys long-needed resources with the treasure.
