= Zindler =

Zindler is a German surname, it means silk merchant. Notable people with the surname include:

- Frank Zindler (born 1939), American atheist
- Marvin Zindler (1921–2007), American reporter
- Petra Zindler (born 1966), German swimmer

== See also ==
- Zindel
