= Tom som =

Thai soup

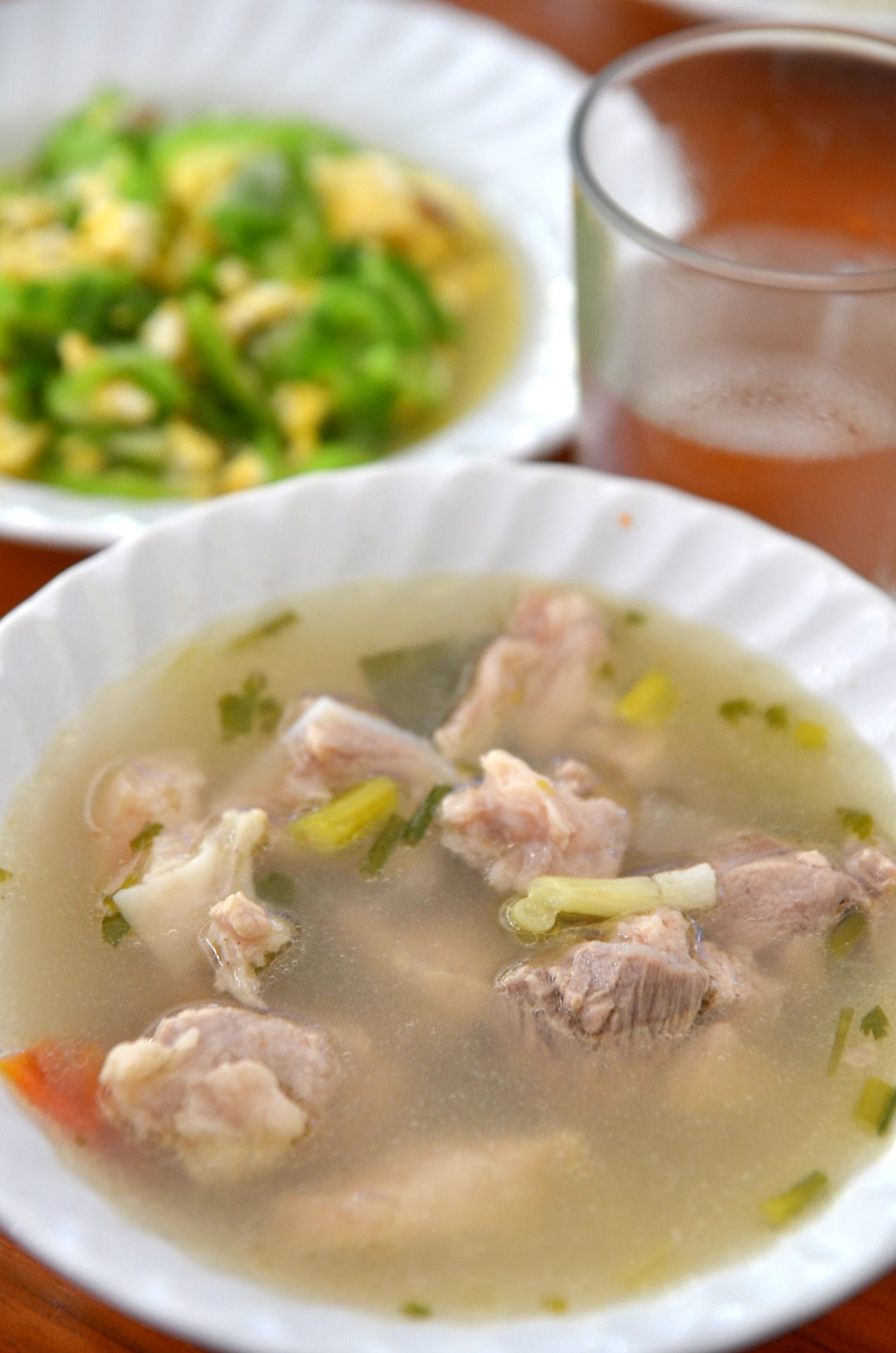
- Tom som with pork
- Place of origin: Thailand
- Associated cuisine: Thai
- Serving temperature: Hot
- Main ingredients: seafood, chili paste
- Ingredients generally used: kapi, shallot, coriander, tamarind, palm sugar, fish sauce
- Similar dishes: Tom yum

Tom som (Thai: ต้มส้ม, pronounced [tôm sôm]) is a sour soup of Thai origin which usually contains seafood or chicken.

== Etymology ==
The word tom means "boil", and som means "sour".

== History ==
The soup is typically made in northern Thailand. According to Chumpol Jangprai, the Thai word "som" has traditionally been used to describe anything that is sour.

== Ingredients ==
According to Thai chef Bo Songvisava, the broth includes a sour ingredient such as sour tamarind (som makaam), bilimbi (taling pling), nipa palm vinegar (nam som jaak), or roselle flowers (dok krajieb sod) in a chili paste including krill paste (kapi), coriander root, fish sauce, and shallot. Usually a seafood such as shrimp or fish or other meat such as chicken is added near the end of preparation time.

== Production method ==
The ingredients are simmered to make a broth, then often strained through a sieve or cheesecloth. Just before serving, small pieces of seafood or chicken are added and simmered just until cooked.

== Serving ==
Tom som soups are eaten as a meal, as part of a meal, or as aahaan kap klaem (drinking food).

== See also ==
- List of soups
- Kaeng som
- Tom kha
- Tom khlong
- Tom yum
- Thai cuisine
