= Confessions of a Teenage Baboon =

1977 novel by Paul Zindel

- First edition
- Author: Paul Zindel
- Language: English
- Genre: Young adult literature
- Publisher: Harper Trophy
- Publication date: 1977
- Publication place: United States
- Media type: Print (hardback & paperback)
- Pages: 154
- ISBN: 0-06-026843-3

Confessions of a Teenage Baboon is a young adult novel by Paul Zindel, published in 1977. The semi-autobiographical book tells of Chris, the son of a nurse who works with terminally ill patients, and his coming to terms with his selfhood and his mother.

== Plot ==
Chris Boyd is a teenage boy living in Staten Island, New York. He lives with his mother Helen, who works as a live-in hospice nurse. As such, he often changes schools as his mother changes assignments, making it difficult for him to make friends. His parents are divorced, with him describing their separation as his father saying he was "going out to buy the evening paper but went to Mexico," where he later died from "an overdose of amoebas." Chris, being of small build, aspires to someday fit into a Chesterfield overcoat that his father left behind, and regards it at his most prized possession.

Helen's latest assignment takes them to the home of Lloyd DiPardi, whom Chris describes as "about thirty years old with enough muscles to beat up anybody within a ten mile radius", but whose circle of friends happen to be teenagers. Lloyd's elderly parents, "Pops" and Carmelita live with him. Carmelita is terminally ill and takes up much of Helen's time, while "Pops" has mental health issues that are never fully explained. Chris meets a friend of Lloyd's named Harold, a boy close to Chris' age who has a solid muscular build like Lloyd. Chris bonds with Harold, but Lloyd's brash, street smart demeanor puts Chris off. Harold, aware of the tension, tries to defuse things between them by sharing with Chris the fact that he too was awkward and underweight, but Lloyd helped him build his confidence and eat the right foods.

Through all this is a subplot involving the relationship that Chris has with his mother. One particularly humiliating ritual for Chris is her making him urinate in a milk bottle in cases where they have to share a bathroom with her patient's family. Lloyd particularly enjoys taunting Chris with this knowledge (as well as Chris' obsession with the overcoat), especially after he discovers that Helen has been stealing household goods and food from their pantry. Lloyd also drinks heavily and holds wild pool parties - replete with teenage girls - at the house.

Over time, Chris and Lloyd establish a shaky truce, as they begin to understand one another. Chris begins to take Lloyd's hints that he must take responsibility for his own life and begins to stand up to his mother, at one point destroying the hated milk bottle. Chris also learns from a girl he meets at one of Lloyd's parties that Carmelita had abused him physically after she had caught him in a sexual act with a stuffed animal when he was a small child. Carmelita dies, and Chris and his mother depart the DiPardi home. On their way to a hotel to wait for their next assignment, Helen tells Chris that she left his father's overcoat behind, calling it "an old rag as worthless as your rotten father". Angry, Chris flees her and goes back to the DiPardi home to retrieve the coat, fully expecting it to be destroyed. He instead finds a saddened Lloyd, a much different person than whom Chris first met. Lloyd tells Chris that despite the relationship he may have with his mother, he must still cherish it, and to remember the good over the bad. Chris takes this to heart and returns to his mother, completely forgetting the reason why he came...the overcoat. Once he realizes this, he makes peace with himself, no longer feeling the need to have it.

== Reception ==
The novel was referenced as a suggesting reading for "less able adult readers" in 1982. Critic of youth literature Lilian Shapiro was not a fan, and Kenneth Donelson in 1981 thought it was a "bit of fluff". A decade later, Donelson remarked that "Zindel had turned into a jokester". In 1982, Don Nilsen and Alleen Pace Nilsen praise Zindel's humor, including the "natural sounding grossness" in Chris' introduction of himself.
