= The Pigman & Me =

- 1991 edition (The Bodley Head)
- Author: Paul Zindel
- Language: English
- Genre: Young Adult Literature; Autobiographies
- Publisher: Bantam Starfire (1990); Red Fox (1991); Lions (1991); Heinemann New Windmills(1991); Graymalkin Media (Audio CD; 2005); The Bodley Head (1991)
- Publication date: 1990
- Publication place: United States
- Media type: Print (hardback & paperback)
- ISBN: 978-0-06-075735-9
- OCLC: 58968588
- Preceded by: The Pigman (1968), The Pigman's Legacy (1980)

The Pigman & Me is an autobiography by Paul Zindel. It was first published in 1990 by Bantam Starfire. The book is considered an unofficial triquel to the 1968 fiction bestseller The Pigman and is part of The Pigman series of books.

== See also ==
- The Pigman
- The Pigman's Legacy
