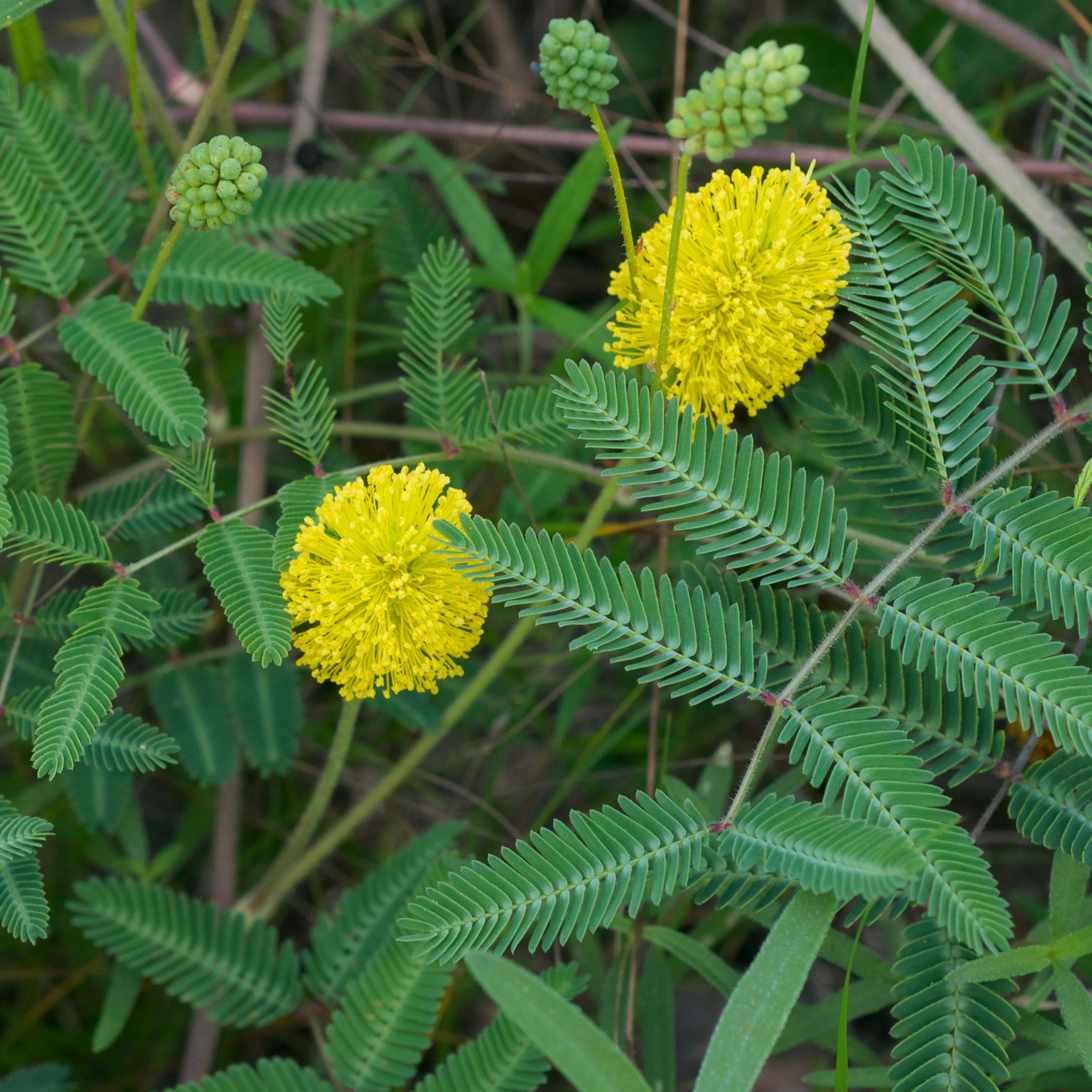
- Flower, flower bud, and foliage

Scientific classification
- Kingdom: Plantae
- Clade: Tracheophytes
- Clade: Angiosperms
- Clade: Eudicots
- Clade: Rosids
- Order: Fabales
- Family: Fabaceae
- Subfamily: Caesalpinioideae
- Clade: Mimosoid clade
- Genus: Neptunia
- Species: N. lutea

Binomial name
- Neptunia lutea (Leavenworth) Benth.

= Neptunia lutea =

Species of legume

Neptunia lutea, commonly called the yellow neptunia or the yellow-puff, is an herbaceous plant in the legume family (Fabaceae). It is native to the United States, where it is primarily found in the South Central region, extending eastward into the Blackland Prairies of Alabama and Mississippi. Its natural habitat is in open areas such as prairies and savannas. It is tolerant of disturbed soil.

== Description ==
Neptunia lutea is a trailing, vine-like perennial. Its stems are covered with soft spines, but is not nearly as prickly as the similar-looking Mimosa nuttallii.

The sprawling stems of this plant branch frequently, with each branch growing as long as 5 ft. Leaves are alternate and stalked, bipinnate, looking much like tiny fern fronds. The flowers are tiny and arranged in a slightly elongated, congested bundle (inflorescence) containing 30-60 flowers each. The unopened bud clusters look much like green bramble fruits. Each individual flower has five minute petals and ten stamens. When the flowers open, the inflorescence looks like a puffy yellow ball, with usually only the long yellow stamens visible. The inflorescence rests solitary at the end of a slender stalk.

Like some Mimosa, the leaves of this plant exhibit rapid plant movement. They will close upon touch, as well as at night and during periods of cloudy weather.

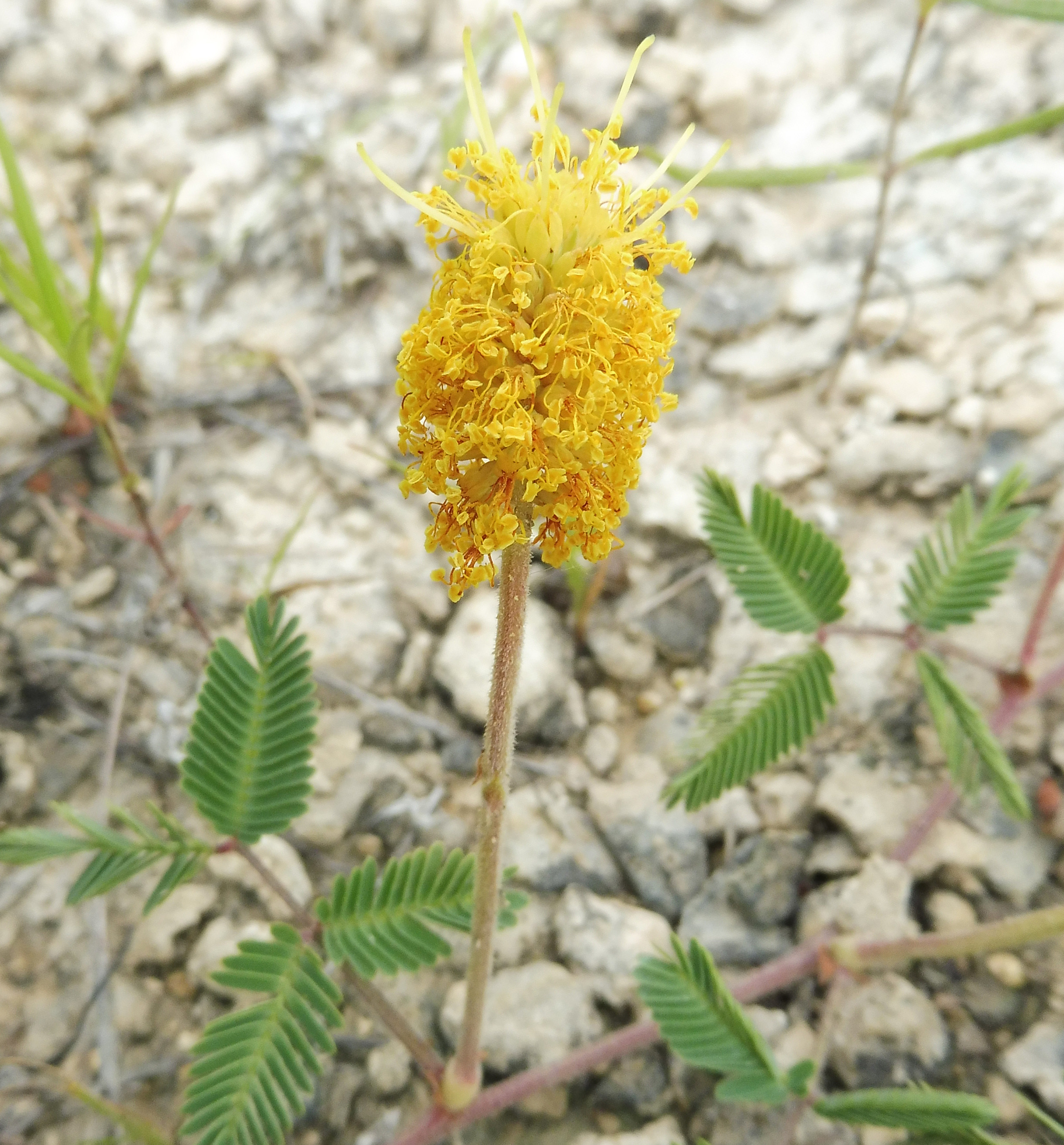
Detail of flowering head
