= My Darling, My Hamburger =

1969 novel written by Paul Zindel

- First edition
- Author: Paul Zindel
- Language: English
- Genre: Young Adult literature
- Publisher: Harper and Row
- Publication date: 1969
- Publication place: United States
- Media type: Print (Hardback & Paperback)
- Pages: 176 pages
- ISBN: 0-06-075736-1
- LC Class: CPB Box no. 2360 vol. 14

My Darling, My Hamburger is a young adult novel written by Paul Zindel, first published in 1969.

== Plot summary ==
As part one begins, the reader meets the story's protagonist, a quiet and rather plain-looking girl named Maggie Tobin, who is walking through the school auditorium with her sophisticated, gorgeous best friend, Liz Carstensen. The two settle down into their seats while Pierre Jefferson, the grade president, begins to speak. During the assembly, Maggie points out Sean Collins, the handsome young gentleman whom Liz is currently seeing. Next to Sean is a rather gawky-looking guy by the name of Dennis Holowitz. Maggie thinks Dennis looks dorky but eventually agrees to go on a date with him, Liz, and Sean. The date is a disaster, as Maggie hates both the movie and her companion. Despite this, Maggie agrees to go on another date with Dennis. While on this double date, Liz and Sean travel down to the ocean to spend some intimate time together. Just as everything is becoming “heated up,” Liz backs away. It becomes apparent that the two constantly fight over sexual matters. Back in the car, Dennis moves closer and closer to Maggie, eventually beginning to make out with her. In order to prevent the situation from heating up any further, a panicked Maggie recommends that the two go and get a hamburger.

Not too long after their second date, Maggie is compelled to break off a date with Dennis because Liz and Sean are in a fight. That night, Maggie and Liz set out for the Red Pub Inn. On the way, they are given a lift by Rod Gittens, an older boy with dashingly good looks but a very poor reputation. While at the Red Pub Inn, Liz writes Sean a letter on the back of a place setting. She declares her love for him and speaks of how she needs him in her life. The letter is dropped off in Sean's mailbox and Liz waits for a response. When Liz does not hear back from Sean, she decides to go to the winter dance with Rod Gittens. While at the dance, it becomes apparent that Liz is using Rod to try to get back at Sean for not responding to her letter. By the end of the night, Rod has Liz in a room alone, ready to rape her. The quick work of Maggie saves Liz from catastrophe as Sean is alerted about Rod and rushes over to the dance. Liz learns that Sean never received her letter, and the two leave the dance together.

Shortly after the dance, the reader learns that Liz is pregnant with Sean's baby. Liz appeals to Maggie for help and states that she does not have enough money to pay for an abortion. Eventually, Liz tells Sean about the baby and the two decide to get married and move to California. Liz is elated, but Sean is a little distressed with the situation. Sean asks his father for advice about “a friend” who got a girl pregnant. The reader learns that Sean's father is a conservative fellow who likes his alcohol. Sean's father tells his son that the “friend” should get the young lady out of his life as soon as possible, as the guy would likely be giving up his life if he kept his connections with the girl. Upon hearing this news, Sean realizes that he has too much ahead of him in life and decides to break up with Liz. Soon after his realization, Sean gives Liz $300 and tells her that they must part.

A deeply saddened Liz is forced to miss prom as she travels with Maggie and Rod to a doctor who can perform her abortion. When Liz finishes with the doctor, she appears comfortable and in good spirits. Despite this positive sign, as the girls arrive at Liz’s house, Maggie realizes that her friend is hemorrhaging. Frightened, Maggie runs into Liz’s house to get her mother.

At graduation, it's revealed that Liz will not be graduating with the rest of her class. Maggie has called Liz's house numerous times, but is told by Liz's mother that Liz never wishes to speak with her again. At graduation, Maggie contemplates the important milestone she is experiencing. She realizes that one's present soon becomes one's past. This past then stays with the person for life. On this note, Maggie finds Dennis, wishes him luck, and gives him a goodbye kiss.

== Media ==
The novel is mentioned in the book My Posse Don't Do Homework and the film Dangerous Minds starring Michelle Pfeiffer.
