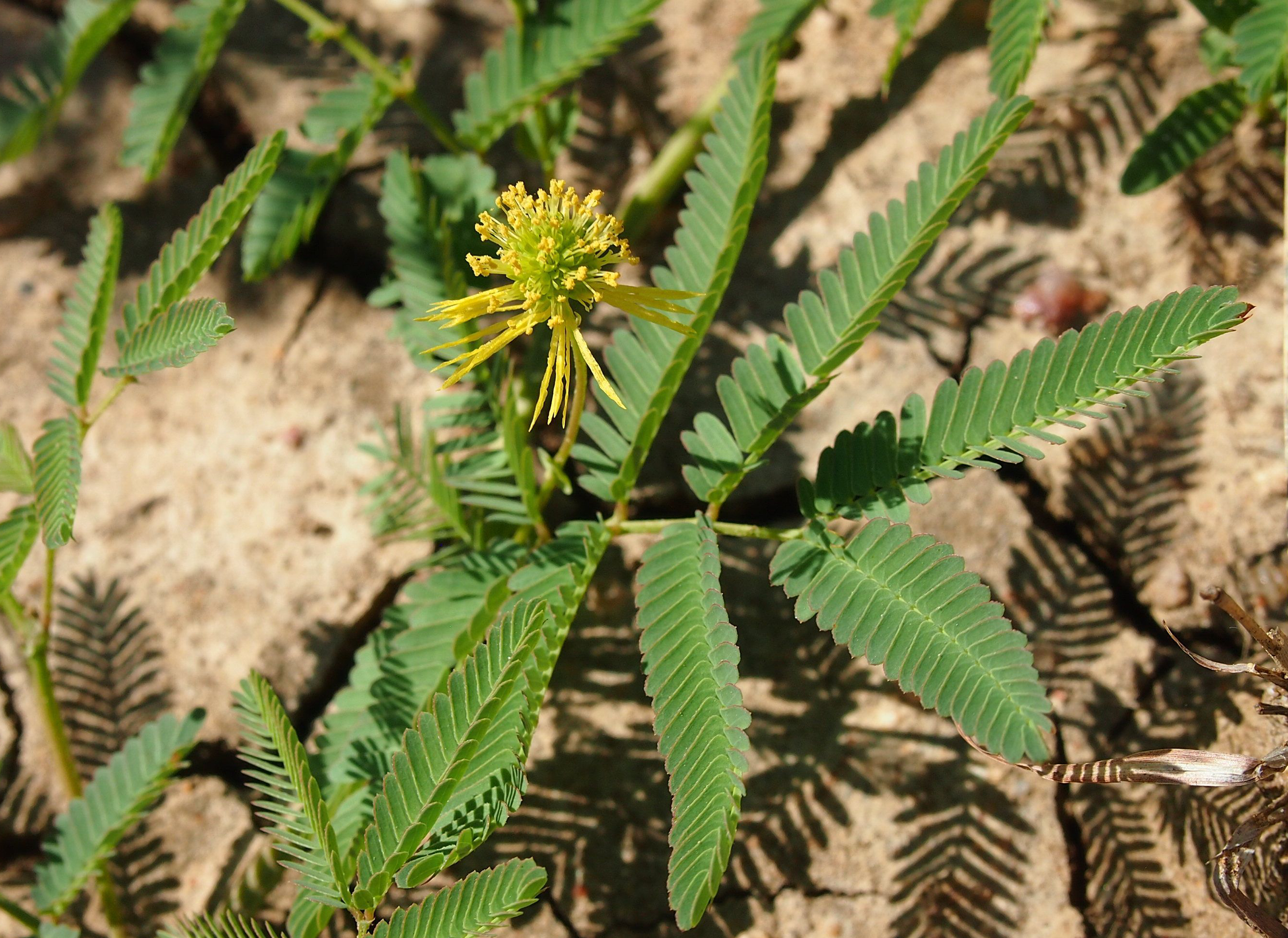

Scientific classification
- Kingdom: Plantae
- Clade: Tracheophytes
- Clade: Angiosperms
- Clade: Eudicots
- Clade: Rosids
- Order: Fabales
- Family: Fabaceae
- Subfamily: Caesalpinioideae
- Clade: Mimosoid clade
- Genus: Neptunia
- Species: N. dimorphantha

Binomial name
- Neptunia dimorphantha Domin

Synonyms
- Neptunia dimorphantha var. clementii Domin; Neptunia dimorphantha var. dimorphantha Domin

= Neptunia dimorphantha =

Species of plant

Neptunia dimorphantha, commonly known as sensitive plant, is a trailing perennial plant from Australia in the family Fabaceae. It produces yellow flowers between July and November.

The species was first formally described by Czech botanist Karel Domin in 1930 in Bibliotheca Botanica, based on a collection in Queensland.
