= Lizabeth Zindel =

American writer

- Born: New York City, U.S.
- Education: Dalton School; Wesleyan University
- Occupations: editor-in-chief; writer; director; producer
- Parent(s): Paul Zindel; Bonnie Zindel
- Website: www.lizabethzindel.com

Lizabeth Zindel is the founder and editor-in-chief of Hamptons Social, and an American writer, director, and producer. She is the author of Girl of the Moment, The Secret Rites of Social Butterflies, and A Girl, a Ghost, and the Hollywood Hills published by Penguin Group. She directed and produced the short documentary Keep It Real: Banksy NYC that premiered at the Cannes Film Festival in 2014. She is a member of the Ensemble Studio Theatre, a non-profit membership-based developmental theatre located in New York City where she starred in the premiere of Wendy MacLeod's play The Shallow End.

== Personal life ==
Lizabeth Claire Zindel was born in New York City. She is the daughter of Bonnie Zindel, a psychoanalyst and novelist, and Paul Zindel, a Pulitzer Prize-Winning playwright and author. She has a brother named David Zindel. She attended the Dalton School and Wesleyan University.

== Professional ==
Zindel worked as an assistant at Creative Artists Agency and Maverick Records. She has appeared in People Magazine, CosmoGirl, American Cheerleader, and Justine Magazine. Zindel was selected as a "Flying Start" by Publishers Weekly. Girl of the Moment was selected by the New York Public Library as a "Book for the Teen Age", an annual list of the best titles for teens.

Zindel is the Founder and Editor-in-Chief of Hamptons Social magazine, a luxury publication of The Hamptons.
