= Bonnie Zindel =

Bonnie Zindel is an American psychotherapist, psychoanalyst, published Young-adult Fiction Novelist, Playwright, and Creative Literary Editor of Psychoanalytic Perspectives published by Routledge, Taylor & Francis.

== Creative works ==
She is the author of the Young Adult novels Dr. Adriana Earthlight, Student Shrink, Hollywood Dream Machine, and A Star for the Latecomer published by HarperCollins and Viking Press. A Star for the Latecomer was co-written with Pulitzer Prize-winning playwright, Paul Zindel and was selected as a Best Young Adult Book, American Library Association, 1971. The novels have earned a place in '80's Teen Book Pop Culture.

Her play I Am A Zoo was produced by the Jewish Repretory Theater in New York City and is included in New Jewish Voices: Plays Produced by the Jewish Repertory Theatre edited by Edward M. Cohen.

A production of her short play Lemons in the Morning (1983) co-written with Paul Zindel was performed at the Back Alley Theatre in an evening called 24 Hours - AM. The play starred Emmy Award-winning actress Doris Roberts and Alan Oppenheimer.

Zindel is notable for her published book Writing on the Moon: Stories and Poetry from the Creative Unconscious by Psychoanalysts and Others in which it is a collection of acclaimed works in the Creative Literary Section of Psychoanalytic Perspectives. She also contributed her own imagination/studies into this collection.

== Psychology ==
Zindel received the distinguished National Institute for Psychotherapies Honorary Award for creative contributions to the field. She started the Creative Literary Section in Psychoanalytic Perspectives, the first psychoanalytic journal to offer a Creative Literary section devoted to short stories, creative non-fiction and poetry. These pages are dedicated to recognizing pieces tied both strongly and loosely to themes inherent in psychoanalysis and have included original works by well known psychoanalysts Robert Stolorow and Thomas Ogden, as well as, actress Rebecca De Mornay.

Her work on psychoanalysis and creative writing workshops have been featured in The New York Times' Style Section.

She contributed a chapter on Emmanuel Ghent for Clinical Implications of the Psychoanalyst's Life Experience: When the Personal Becomes Professional (2013), a book in which leaders in the fields of psychoanalysis and psychotherapy, including Princess Diana's therapist Susie Orbach, address the phenomena of the psychoanalyst's personal life and psychology.

Psychologist Zindel was interviewed and is quoted in Jon Krampner biography of Academy Award-nominated actress Kim Stanley titled Female Brando: The Legend of Kim Stanley.

== Personal life ==
Zindel was married to Paul Zindel from 1973, divorcing him in 1998. They had two children; novelist and actress Lizabeth Zindel, and son David, a filmmaker.

== Education ==
Zindel received her master's degree in Social Work from the Columbia University School of Social Work.

== Books ==
- A Star For the Latecomer (1985) (written with Paul Zindel)
- Dr. Adriana Earthlight (1988)
- Hollywood Dream Machine (1985)
- A Bird That Thunders: My Analysis with Emmanuel Ghent (2013), published in "Clinical Implications of the Psychoanalyst's Life Experience" (Edited by Steve Kuchuck)
