= Let Me Hear You Whisper (NET Playhouse) =

- NET Playhouse episode
- Episode no.: Season 3 Episode 25
- Directed by: Glenn Jordan
- Written by: Paul Zindel
- Original air date: May 23, 1969
- Running time: 75 minutes

Guest appearances
- Bil Baird as The Dolphin; Philip Bruns as Dan; Anthony Holland as Fridge; Ruth White as Helen; Elizabeth Wilson as Miss Moray; Iggie Wolfington as Dr. Crocus

Episode chronology
← Previous "The Star Wagon"	Next → "Everyman"

"Let Me Hear You Whisper" is a television play written by Paul Zindel.

== Plot ==
The play revolves around Helen, a recently hired scrub-woman, at the American Biological Association Development for the Advancement of Brain Analysis. During the course of her work, Helen learns the plight of an imprisoned intelligent dolphin that is being harshly studied by scientists. Helen begins to interact with the dolphin by feeding it and playing it music. Soon the dolphin begins to talk, but to no one but her. After overhearing of a final experiment that would leave the dolphin dead, Helen attempts to rescue the dolphin in a laundry hamper, but is unable to and the dolphin is vivisected and euthanized.

== The Shape of Water controversy ==
In February 2018, David Zindel, the son of Paul Zindel, brought a plagiarism lawsuit against the makers of the film The Shape of Water, alleging that its plot about a romance between a cleaning woman and a mysterious river creature was lifted directly from Let Me Hear You Whisper. The film contains numerous plot elements that "include the play and the movie's basic story of the lonely janitor who works at a scientific laboratory during the Cold War, forms a loving bond with a captive aquatic creature and hatches a plan to liberate it."

Fox Searchlight Pictures studio as well as the makers of the film have denied that the work was at all derived from the play. Guillermo del Toro, the film's director, has claimed in an interview that the story came from a conversation with the novelist Daniel Kraus who is an associate producer of the film.

On April 5, 2021, the following statement by plaintiff was released: "David Zindel, the son of Paul Zindel, author of Let Me Hear You Whisper, acknowledges, based on confidential information obtained during the litigation process, that his claims of plagiarism are unfounded. He acknowledges Guillermo del Toro as the true creator of The Shape of Water. Any similarity between the two works is coincidental."
