= Paul Zindel =

American writer (1936–2003)

- Born: May 15, 1936; New York City, New York, U.S.
- Died: March 27, 2003 (aged 66); New York City, New York, U.S.
- Occupation: Writer
- Spouse: Bonnie Hildebrand (m. 1973; div. 1998)
- Writing career
- Genres: Drama, novels, screenplays
- Notable works: The Pigman, The Effect of Gamma Rays on Man-in-the-Moon Marigolds
- Notable awards: Pulitzer Prize for Drama; 1971; Margaret Edwards Award; 2002

Paul Zindel Jr. (May 15, 1936 – March 27, 2003) was an American playwright, young adult novelist, and educator.

== Early life ==
Zindel was born in Tottenville, Staten Island, New York, to Paul Zindel Sr., a policeman, and Betty Zindel, a nurse; his sister, Betty (Zindel) Hagen, was a year and a half older than him. Both of his parents were of Ashkenazi Jewish origins. Paul Zindel Sr. ran away with his mistress when Zindel was two, leaving the trio to move around Staten Island, living in various houses and apartments.

Zindel wrote his first play in high school. Throughout his teen years, he wrote plays, though he trained as a chemist at Wagner College and spent six months working at Allied Chemical as a chemical writer after graduating. Zindel took a creative-writing course with the playwright Edward Albee while he was an undergraduate. Albee became his mentor and was an advocate for Zindel. He later quit and worked as a high-school Chemistry and Physics teacher at Tottenville High School on Staten Island for ten years. Zindel seemed to gravitate toward behavior that allowed him to observe the reactions of others in strange situations: Olen Soifer, visiting with his father Dave, who was the long-time lab technician at the high school, remembers seeing Zindel wearing black shoes with the front of one cut off, such that his white-socked toes could not be missed sticking out of the shoe.

== Career ==
In 1964, he wrote The Effect of Gamma Rays on Man-in-the-Moon Marigolds, his first and most successful play. The play ran off-Broadway in 1970, and on Broadway in 1971, and he received the 1971 Pulitzer Prize for Drama for the work. However, this play also received criticism for being too elliptical or too difficult to understand. Still, it was also made into a 1972 movie by 20th Century Fox, directed by Paul Newman and starring his wife Joanne Woodward. Soon thereafter, Charlotte Zolotow, a vice-president at Harper & Row, contacted him about writing for her publishing house.

Zindel wrote over 50 books, all but one of them aimed at children or teens. Many were set in his home town of Staten Island. They tended to be semi-autobiographical, focusing on teenage misfits with abusive or neglectful parents. Zindel himself grew up in a single-parent household; his mother worked at various occupations: hat-check girl, shipyard worker, dog breeder, hot-dog vendor, and finally, licensed practical nurse, often boarding terminally ill patients at their home. They moved frequently, and his mother often engaged in "get-rich-quick" schemes that did not succeed. His father abandoned them early in his life. This upbringing was most closely depicted in Confessions of a Teenage Baboon.

Despite the often dark subject matter of his books, which deal with loneliness, loss, and the effects of abuse, they are also filled with humor. Many of his novels have zany titles, such as My Darling, My Hamburger, Pardon Me, You're Stepping on My Eyeball! or Confessions of a Teenage Baboon. My Darling, My Hamburger specifically deals with teen sexuality, abuse within the home, teen pregnancy, and abortion.

The Pigman, first published in 1968, deals with love and finding friends in odd places. It is widely taught in American schools and made it onto the list of most frequently banned books in America in the 1990s; for example, Plano, Texas parents complained of offensive language and sexual themes. Zindel stated that "I ignore critics usually. I believe the perfect story is a dream."

Zindel received the annual Margaret A. Edwards Award from the American Library Association in 2002, recognizing his cumulative "significant and lasting contribution to young adult literature". The jury cited five works said to be published 1968 to 1993: The Effect of Gamma Rays on Man-in-the-Moon Marigolds; My Darling, My Hamburger; and the Pigman trilogy. The citation called The Pigman "one of the first authentic young adult novels" and the panel chair observed that "Paul Zindel knows and understands the reality young adults deal with day-to-day ... He has the ability to depict young adults in an honest and realistic way. The characters he developed nearly 40 years ago still speak to today's teens."

Beginning with Loch in 1994, Zindel wrote numerous speculative fiction novels for children or young adults, mainly in the horror genre.

Zindel also worked in Hollywood, writing the screenplays for, among other titles, Up the Sandbox, Mame and Runaway Train. He also studied acting with Tracey Roberts (actress).

== Personal life and death ==
Zindel was married to Bonnie Hildebrand from 1973, divorcing her in 1998. They had two children; novelist Lizabeth Zindel, and son David, a publisher.

A resident of Montague Township, New Jersey, Zindel died in New York City from lung cancer in 2003, at the Jacob Perlow Hospice in Beth Israel Medical Center in Manhattan. He is buried in Moravian Cemetery, Staten Island.

== Works ==
=== Plays ===
- The Effect of Gamma Rays on Man-in-the-Moon Marigolds, 1964
- The Ladies Should Be in Bed
- And Miss Reardon Drinks A Little, 1967
- Let Me Hear You Whisper, 1969
- The Secret Affairs of Mildred Wild, 1972
- Every 17 Minutes the Crowd Goes Crazy
- Ladies at the Alamo, 1977
- Amulets Against the Dragon Forces, 1989

=== Novels ===
==== The Zone Unknown ====
- Loch, New York: HarperCollins, 1994.
- The Doom Stone, New York: HarperCollins, 1995.
- Raptor, New York: Hyperion, 1998.
- Rats, New York: Hyperion, 1999.
- Reef of Death, New York: HarperCollins, 1998.
- Night of the Bat, New York: Hyperion, 2001.
- The Gadget, New York: HarperCollins, 2001.

==== P.C. Hawke Mysteries ====
- The Scream Museum, New York: Hyperion, 2001.
- The Surfing Corpse, New York: Hyperion, 2001.
- The E-Mail Murders, New York: Hyperion, 2001.
- The Lethal Gorilla, New York: Hyperion, 2001.
- The Square Root of Murder, 2002.
- Death on the Amazon, 2002.
- The Gourmet Zombie, 2002.
- The Phantom of 86th Street, 2002.
- Harry and Hortense at Hormone High, New York: Harper, 1985.

==== The Wacky Facts Lunch Bunch ====
- Attack of the Killer Fishsticks, New York: Bantam, 1993.
- Fifth Grade Safari, New York: Bantam, 1992.
- Fright Party, New York: Bantam, 1993.
- One Hundred Percent Laugh Riot, New York: Bantam, 1994.

==== The Pigman Trilogy ====
- The Pigman, New York: Harper, 1968. ‡
- The Pigman's Legacy, New York: Harper, 1981. ‡
- The Pigman & Me, New York: HarperCollins, 1992. ‡

==== Other novels ====
- My Darling, My Hamburger, New York: Harper, 1969. ‡
- I Never Loved Your Mind, New York: Harper, 1970.
- I Love My Mother, New York: Harper, 1975.
- Pardon Me, You're Stepping on My Eyeball!, New York: Harper, 1976.
- Confessions of a Teenage Baboon, New York: Harper, 1977.
- The Undertaker's Gone Bananas, New York: Harper, 1978.
- A Star for the Latecomer (with Bonnie Zindel), New York: Harper, 1980.
- The Girl Who Wanted a Boy, New York: Harper, 1981.
- To Take a Dare (with Crescent Dragonwagon), New York: Harper, 1982.
- When a Darkness Falls Bantam Books, 1984.
- The Amazing and Death-Defying Diary of Eugene Dingman, New York: Harper, 1987.
- A Begonia for Miss Applebaum, New York: Harper, 1989.
- David & Della, New York: HarperCollins, 1993.
- Club de collecionistas de noticias
- The Houdini Whodunit, 2002.
- Death by CD, 2003.
- The Petrified Parrot, 2003.
- Camp Megadeath, 2003.

(‡) The Young Adult Library Services Association cited five books when Zindel won the 2002 Edwards Award.

=== Short stories ===
- Love & Centipedes, 1999. Also included in Places I Never Meant to Be by Judy Blume.
- Rachel's Vampire, 2001. Also included in Lost and Found by Joan Abelove

=== Screenplays ===
- Let Me Hear You Whisper - 1969 television movie based on his play
- Up the Sandbox - 1972 movie with Barbra Streisand and David Selby
- Mame - 1974 musical film starring Lucille Ball, based on the stage musical of the same name.
- Maria's Lovers - 1984 film, with Nastassja Kinski, John Savage and Robert Mitchum
- Runaway Train - 1985 film starring Jon Voight, Eric Roberts, and Rebecca De Mornay; nominated for three Academy Awards
- Alice in Wonderland - 1985 television movie, with an all-star cast
- Babes in Toyland - 1986 television adaptation of the film, starring Keanu Reeves and Drew Barrymore
- A Connecticut Yankee in King Arthur's Court - 1989 television adaptation of the novel by Mark Twain.
