= Dahlia Adler =

American author

- Born: New York City, U.S.
- Education: New York University (BA)
- Children: 2
- Writing career
- Years active: 2014–present
- Genres: young adult, new adult
- Notable works: Going Bicoastal; Cool for the Summer; Out on Good Behavior
- Website: dahliaadler.com

Dahlia Adler is an American author of young adult, new adult, and adult fiction.

== Early life and education ==
Adler was born in New York City and raised in the suburbs. She is a graduate of New York University, with a BA in journalism.

== Writing career ==
Adler's debut young adult novel, Behind the Scenes, about high school senior Ally who gets entangled in her celebrity best friend Vanessa's Hollywood life when she falls for her co-star, was published in 2014 by Spencer Hill. It has also been translated into Spanish and published by Ediciones Kiwi. A companion novel, Under the Lights, followed in 2015. In the companion novel Vanessa has to deal with a new co-star while Ally is off at college, and the former unexpectedly falls for the girl assigned by her publicist to handle her. Under the Lights was included on ALA's Rainbow Book List in 2016.

Adler wrote a three-book new adult series called Radleigh University. The third book, Out on Good Behavior, was a finalist for the 2016 Bisexual Book Awards in both Teen Literature and Romance.

In 2021, Adler published her first young adult novel in five years, Cool for the Summer, with Wednesday Books. It was an Indie Next pick, an Amazon Best Book of the Month, and Alma's choice for Best YA of 5781. Her next novel, Home Field Advantage, released on June 7, 2022, and was an Indie Next Pick and Junior Library Guild selection. Her next novel, Going Bicoastal, released in June 2023 and received a Sydney Taylor Book Award silver medal for YA. All three books are on the ALA Rainbow Book List.

Adler is the editor of His Hideous Heart, an anthology of retellings of Edgar Allan Poe stories, featuring authors Kendare Blake, Rin Chupeco, Lamar Giles, Tessa Gratton, Tiffany D. Jackson, Stephanie Kuehn, Amanda Lovelace, Emily Lloyd-Jones, Hillary Monahan, Marieke Nijkamp, Caleb Roehrig, and Fran Wilde, which was published by Flatiron in 2019. It was named a Junior Library Guild selection and a Best YA of the Year by Publishers Weekly and Kirkus. In 2019, she announced her next anthology, That Way Madness Lies, a collection of reimaginings of Shakespeare's work; it published in 2021 and named a Bank Street Best Young Adult Book of the Year. Her third anthology, At Midnight, released in 2022.

She also contributed to three young adult anthologies out with Candlewick in 2018, Harlequin Teen in 2018, and Knopf in 2019.

In 2026, Adler published her first novel for adults, a Modern Orthodox Romance called Soon By You, which became a USA Today bestseller.

In addition to writing novels, she also runs the queer representation-focused blog LGBTQreads.com, and was a blogger at the Barnes & Noble Teen blog from December 2013 until November 2019 and a contributor to Buzzfeed Books from January 2020 to April 2023. As of June 2023, she is a monthly guest contributor to the Romance blog Smart Bitches, Trashy Books.

== Bibliography ==
=== Young Adult ===
==== Novels ====
- Behind the Scenes (2014, Spencer Hill)
- Under the Lights (2015, Spencer Hill)
- Just Visiting (2015, Spencer Hill)
- Cool for the Summer (2021, Wednesday Books)
- Home Field Advantage (2022, Wednesday Books)
- Going Bicoastal (2023, Wednesday Books)
- Come as You Are (2025, Wednesday Books)

==== Anthologies (Editor) ====
- His Hideous Heart (2019, Flatiron Books)
- That Way Madness Lies (2021, Flatiron Books)
- At Midnight (2022, Flatiron Books)
- Out of Our League (with Jennifer Iacopelli) (2024, Feiwel & Friends)
- For the Rest of Us (2025, Quill Tree Books)

Anthologies (Contributor)

- "Daughter of the Book" in The Radical Element, edited by Jessica Spotswood (2018, Candlewick)
- "Molly's Lips" in All Out, edited by Saundra Mitchell (2018, Harlequin Teen)
- "Two Truths and an Oy" in It's a Whole Spiel, edited by Laura Silverman and Katherine Locke (2019, Knopf)
- "Lygia" in His Hideous Heart, edited by Dahlia Adler (2019, Flatiron Books)
- "I Bleed" in That Way Madness Lies, edited by Dahlia Adler (2021, Flatiron Books)
- "Say My Name" in At Midnight, edited by Dahlia Adler (2022, Flatiron Books)
- "Volley Girl" in Out of Our League, edited by Dahlia Adler and Jennifer Iacopelli (2024, Feiwel & Friends)

=== New Adult Novels ===
1. Last Will and Testament (2014)
2. Right of First Refusal (2016)
3. Out on Good Behavior (2016)

=== Adult Novels ===
- Soon By You (2026, St. Martin's Griffin)
- Summer Camp Romance (2027, St. Martin's Griffin)

== Honors and awards ==
- 2016: Bisexual Book Award in Teen Literature and Romance for Out on Good Behavior (nominated)
- 2019: Publishers Weekly Starred Review for His Hideous Heart
- 2021: Indie Next List (Cool for the Summer)
- 2021: Alma Award for Best Jewish YA Novel of 5781 for Cool for the Summer
- 2022: Publishers Weekly Starred Review for Home Field Advantage
- 2022: Indie Next List (Home Field Advantage)
- 2022: Publishers Weekly Starred Review for At Midnight
- 2023: Indie Next List (Going Bicoastal)
- 2024: Indie Next List (Out of Our League)
- 2024: Sydney Taylor Book Award Honor for Going Bicoastal
