= Hillary Monahan =

American novelist

- Occupation: Novelist
- Writing career
- Pen name: Thea De Salle; Eva Darrows
- Language: English
- Years active: 2014-present
- Genres: Young adult; horror; romance; fantasy
- Notable work: MARY: The Summoning
- Website: hillaryjmonahan.com

Hillary Monahan is an American author, best known for her New York Times-bestselling debut novel MARY: The Summoning. Her work includes young adult, horror, urban fantasy, and romance novels. She has published more than a dozen books. Her other pen names include Thea de Salle and Eva Darrows.

== Personal ==
Monahan describes herself as a horror author. Her fifth young adult novel The Hollow Girl is inspired by her Welsh Romany heritage. Monahan lives in Massachusetts with her husband, hounds, and four cats.

== Selected works ==
=== Novels ===
==== As Hillary Monahan ====
Monahan's first young adult novel, MARY: The Summoning, is the first in its series and is about a group of teens who attempt to summon a ghost that turns out to be Bloody Mary and starts to follow them. It was published by Disney-Hyperion in 2014 and hit the New York Times bestseller list, debuting at #2. A sequel, MARY: Unleashed, was published in 2015.

Monahan's adult fantasy debut, Snake Eyes, is the third novel in the Gods & Monsters series, whose previous two novels were written by Chuck Wendig and Steven Blackmoore. Snake Eyes is about a Lamia, a snake monster from Greek mythology, who leaves her mother and finds herself in a battle between mythological creatures. It was published by Abaddon in 2016.

Her fifth young adult novel and third standalone, The Hollow Girl, is about a Welsh Romani teen who gruesomely gets revenge on the boy who raped her, using violence and magic. It was published by Delacorte in 2017.

==== As Eva Darrows ====
Her first standalone young adult novel, The Awesome was published under the pen name Eva Darrows by Ravenstone in 2015. It's about a seventeen-year-old ghost hunter on a quest to lose her virginity in order to be able to hunt vampires. The Awesome received a starred review from Publishers Weekly.

==== As Thea de Salle ====
Monahan's first adult romance series, NOLA Nights, a three-book series starting with The King of Bourbon Street, was published in 2017 by Pocket Star, under the pen name Thea de Salle.

=== Short stories ===
Monahan also contributed a short story to His Hideous Heart, a 2019 anthology of retellings of Edgar Allan Poe stories, edited by Dahlia Adler, and published by Flatiron Books. Her story appeared alongside authors such as Kendare Blake, Rin Chupeco, Lamar Giles, Tiffany D. Jackson, and Stephanie Kuehn. Monahan also contributed to an charity anthology, called Giving the Devil His Due: Special Edition, edited by Rebecca Brewer and published in the Running Wild Press.

== Bibliography ==
=== As Hillary Monahan ===
==== Young Adult ====
- Bloody Mary Series
1. MARY: The Summoning (Disney Hyperion, 2014)
2. MARY: Unleashed (Disney Hyperion, 2015)
- The Hollow Girl (Delacorte Press, 2017)

==== Fantasy ====
- Snake Eyes (Abaddon, 2016)

=== As Eva Darrows ===
- The Awesome (Ravenstone, 2015)
- Dead Little Mean Girl (Harlequin Teen, 2017)
- Belly Up (Inkyard Press, 2019)

=== As Thea De Salle ===
==== Romance ====
- NOLA Nights Series
1. The King of Bourbon Street (Pocket Star, 2017)
2. The Queen of Dauphine Street (Pocket Star, 2017)
3. The Lady of Royale Street (Pocket Star, 2017)
