= List of Broken Sky characters =

This is a list of characters from the teen novel series, Broken Sky, by Chris Wooding, including character histories.

== Act 1 ==
=== Part 1 ===
==== Ryushi ====
Age: 16
Hair: Blond
Eyes: Blue
Spirit Stones: Sky blue - Ryushi's spirit stones are capable of manipulating particles in the air to create varying amounts of force. In the beginning of the story, he has little to no control over his stones, and their use results in large amounts of destruction and total drainage of his energy. As the story progresses, however, he becomes capable of controlling his power.
Weapon of choice: Sword

Ryushi lived at Osaka Stud, a ranch for breeding wyverns all of his life with his twin sister Kia.\. He was dissatisfied with his life, as he would like to travel outside of his home and see the world. He is jealous of his older brother Takami, who got to travel with their father Banto on his excursions into the outside world. In one such excursion, Banto returned with a young girl named Elani, who he claims was very important making Ryushi promise to protect her with his life.

One day, Osaka Stud was attacked by the Jachyra, agents of King Macaan. The stud was destroyed, but Ryushi is able to escape with Kia and Elani on one of the wyverns. As they escape, Ryushi sees his father murdered by a strange masked man among the king's agents. Ryushi is very loyal to his promise to his father, and he will go to any length to protect Elani. He also tends to be very depressed about his inability to control his stones with the effects of using his stones leaving him exhausted. He can be very headstrong and constantly craves vengeance for what has happened to his family although his desire for justice is not like that of his twin sister, Kia. He later owns/Bonds with a wyvern named Araceil.

==== Kia ====
Age: 16
Hair: Red
Eyes: Green
Spirit Stones: Red - Kia's Spirit Stones control the earth. She is capable of forming barriers and large structures, but her most common use for them is creating a golem from the earth around her to attack enemies.
Weapon of choice: Bo staff
Kia is Ryushi's twin sister. She lived with her family in Osaka Stud, as did Ryushi. Kia often fought Ryushi in training battles, wherein Ryushi was always bested because he couldn't control his Spirit Stones which often left him drained of energy. Kia seemed to be rather popular with the boys in the area, although one reason for this may be that there is little mention of any young females in the village outside of Kia. Ty had a crush on her for many years, and although she did not take it seriously, she enjoyed getting the attention.

When Osaka Stud was destroyed, it changed her immensely, and she became cold and unfeeling towards everyone, including Ryushi and Elani. The only thing she really wants is revenge against the Royalists, to the point where she will even endanger those she once cared about and she will even push herself to the limit to get revenge.

==== Takami ====
Age: 18
Hair: Black
Spirit Stones: Yellow/Green - Takami's Spirit Stones enable him to manipulate heat and flame however he wishes, much like his younger brother's ability to manipulate pure energy.
Weapon of choice: Nodachi

The eldest child of Banto and elder brother to Kia and Ryushi. Known for his greed and lust for power throughout the story, he often resorts to fighting dirty and cheating in order to obtain it. During their life at Osaka Stud, Takami often calls Ryushi "little brother", knowing full well the annoyance using such a nickname causes.

He comes into conflict with the twins several times before gathering the strength to regain his honor before his siblings. In later books, it was revealed that he had actually betrayed his family and sided with King Macaan. Takami was also responsible for murdering his father, Banto during the attack on Osaka Stud, an event Ryushi and Kia witnessed as they fled. During a fight against Ryushi, Takami loses an ear and attempts to kill Ryushi but is stopped from doing so.

==== Banto ====
Father of Ryushi, Kia, and Takami. Unknown to his children, he is the founder of Parakka, a secret rebel group against King Macaan. He sets the events of the story in motion by taking responsibility for the young Resonant, Elani, and bringing her to Osaka Stud for safekeeping. The promise he extracts from Ryushi, to protect Elani with his life, becomes a driving force in his son's life after the destruction of Osaka Stud. During the attack, Banto is executed by a soldier (his son Takami).

==== Ty ====
Banto's Pilot, and a young member of the Pilots' Guild, he uses his spirit stones to fuel and power large machines and vehicles. His romantic feelings for Kia lead him to sacrifice his own safety so that she, Ryushi and Elani can escape the attack on Osaka Stud. Later, when he and Kia are reunited, he becomes a symbol to her of the innocence she lost in the attack and subsequent battles.

==== Elani ====
A mysterious young girl who is brought home with Banto after one of his business trips to Tusami City. She refers to Ryushi and Kia as her "cousins" and Banto as her "uncle", despite being of no actual blood-relation to any of them. It is later revealed that she is a powerful Resonant, and the king is desperately hunting for her.

=== Part 2 ===
==== Tatterdemalion ====
Leader of the Jachyra, and personal servant/confidant of Princess Aurin. Like all Jachyra, he serves the King in show, but is loyal to the princess' will.

=== Part 3 ===
==== Hochi ====
Parakkan and close friend of Banto. He owns a wyvern stud in Tusami City and is the first person Elani, Ryushi and Kia meet after they've escaped the destruction of Osaka Stud. He is also the only character who does not possess any spirit stones (other than Elani, who, as a resonant, was unable to receive them).

==== Gerdi ====
Age: 15
Hair: Green
Spirit Stones: White (with black "tiger stripes") - As with all Noman, Gerdi's spirit-stones revolve around illusion and misdirection. Specifically, Gerdi is able to craft illusions, fooling the minds of others by making them see who he wants them to see in place of his real self.
Weapons of choice: Crossbow and short sword

Gerdi is a Noman child who was taken in by Hochi after being caught attempting to steal from a storehouse in Tusami City. Younger than Ryushi and Kia, Gerdi is a very playful individual, always one to make jokes even in serious situations, mostly at Hochi's expense due to his baldness and stocky build. Despite the number of jokes he makes toward the man in Broken Sky, Gerdi holds a deep respect for the man. After meeting her, he becomes something of an "older brother" figure to Elani.

=== Part 4 ===
==== King Macaan ====
Age: Unknown
Hair: White
Spirit Stones: King Macaan's spirit stones are arguably the most powerful possessed by any individual in Broken Sky. It is unclear as to how many spirit stones Macaan has, but he has the power to create his own illusory reality, which he is able to alter completely by will alone.
Weapon of choice: Sword

Ruthless leader of the Dominions. After losing his parents and wife to a vicious illness, he has become obsessed with his last remaining family member, his daughter Aurin, and literally desires to give her the world on a platter. At the end of the series, Macaan is revealed to be one of the enigmatic Deliverers, but is also revealed to have abused the power by implanting spirit stones within himself, giving him the vast power he commands. While his daughter Aurin wears a Trigger Stone around her neck which allows her to control the arachnid Keriag race, Macaan possesses a second, implanted directly in his forehead, which allows him to control both the Keriags in addition to the Jachyra.

==== Princess Aurin ====
Daughter of Macaan and merciless ruler of Kirin Taq. Often described as being very attractive. Raised in seclusion, she is quickly charmed by the passionate convictions and indefatigable attitude of Ryushi, and grants him special privileges when he is her prisoner; he uses this to get close to her and steal the heartstone of the Keriags.

==== Tochaa ====
Kirin man who took in Elani during her time in Kirin Taq. Was killed by a Kerriag during a raid Parakka were conducting on one of Macaan's heavily guarded areas. He died in Hochi's arms and Hochi, distraught that he had been saved by a man whom he'd considered an enemy spent the next year or so in a dark mood.

==== Moracq ====
An elderly Kirin who lives with Tochaa. Possibly related.

=== Part 5 ===
==== Calica ====
A young woman who is a member of the council on Parakka. Her parents were killed by Maccan's troops. Her spirit stones allow her to sense the past or future by touching objects to view their histories, making her a valuable spy. Has romantic feelings for Ryushi, but is at first unable to express them. She is Princess Aurin's "splitling" (effectively a spiritual doppelganger), and as a result, the only other person who can wear the heartstone and thus, control the Keriags.

==== Otomo ====
A member of the council of Parakka, of equal rank with Calica.

==== Ogara Jin ====
A Parakkan teacher who takes Ryushi and Kia to the Keiko mines.

=== Part 7 ===
==== Whist ====
A mysterious young man with a shadowy past, he first meets Parakka operatives during the foray into Os Dakar prison. He fights by flinging razor-discs, and keeps a pet dog, Blink, who can teleport instantly from place to place and take Whist along for the ride. Blink is a Flicker Dog, and it is hinted at that Whist's spirit stones are able to tame Blink and other animals. Whist is untrustworthy and scheming and willing to betray anyone for the right price.

=== Part 8 ===
==== Kettin ====
Leader of the Fallen Sun tribe on the plateau prison of Os Dakar.

== Act 2 ==
=== Part 1 ===
==== Jaan ====
A young half-breed boy who is often shunned because of his obviously biracial (Dominion-born and Kirin) heritage. He has a special gift for speaking to the Koth Taraan and befriends a young Koth Taraan - whom he names Iriqi, after an old family pet - finding in him the first person he's ever known who (like him) is neither Dominion-folk nor Kirin. His weapon of choice is a pair of dagnas; foot-long serrated blades which are mounted to his forearms by way of a set of wooden sheaths which allow him to retract and extend them at will.

==== Peliqua ====
Jaan's older half-sister, a flighty and giddy girl on the surface, but a brave warrior within. Always concerned for her little brother, the only family she has left, she defends him fiercely from those who would mock him, and often tries to cheer him up. She wears her red hair in distinctive cornrow braids, and fights with a manriki-gusari; a long chain with weights attached to the ends.

=== Part 2 ===
==== Iriqi ====
The Koth Taraan who chooses to observe and aid Parakka. He forms a strong friendship with Jaan.

== Act 3 ==
=== Part 1 ===
==== Mi'atte ====
A slave working in a desert mine with amnesia. Revealed to be Kia, who has gone missing for several months.

==== Jedda ====
Leader of a tribe in the deserts. Develops romantic feelings for Kia and the two later get together at the end of the novel.

==== Li'ain ====
Mysterious woman who helps rescue Kia. She claims to be a "Fetch", a person whose spirit stones allow her to displace matter, thus allowing teleportation. Later revealed to be Aurin.

==== Chiro ====
A Breed; essentially a vat-grown cyborg used as a servile workforce for the Machinists. Breed have a ruthless devotion to carrying out orders given by the highest ranking machinist, and they are completely logical in thinking, leaving no room for emotions. However, as Chiro plays his part, he shows an internal struggle to find a balance between the logical machine part of him and the emotional human.

==== Quain ====
A parakkan machinist who leads Ryushi, Calicia, Gerdi, and Hochi into the machinist's Citadel

=== Part 2 ===
==== Vore ====
Leader of the Jachyra appointed after Tatterdemalion's disappearance.
