= Fear of dolls =

Fear of human-like dolls or models

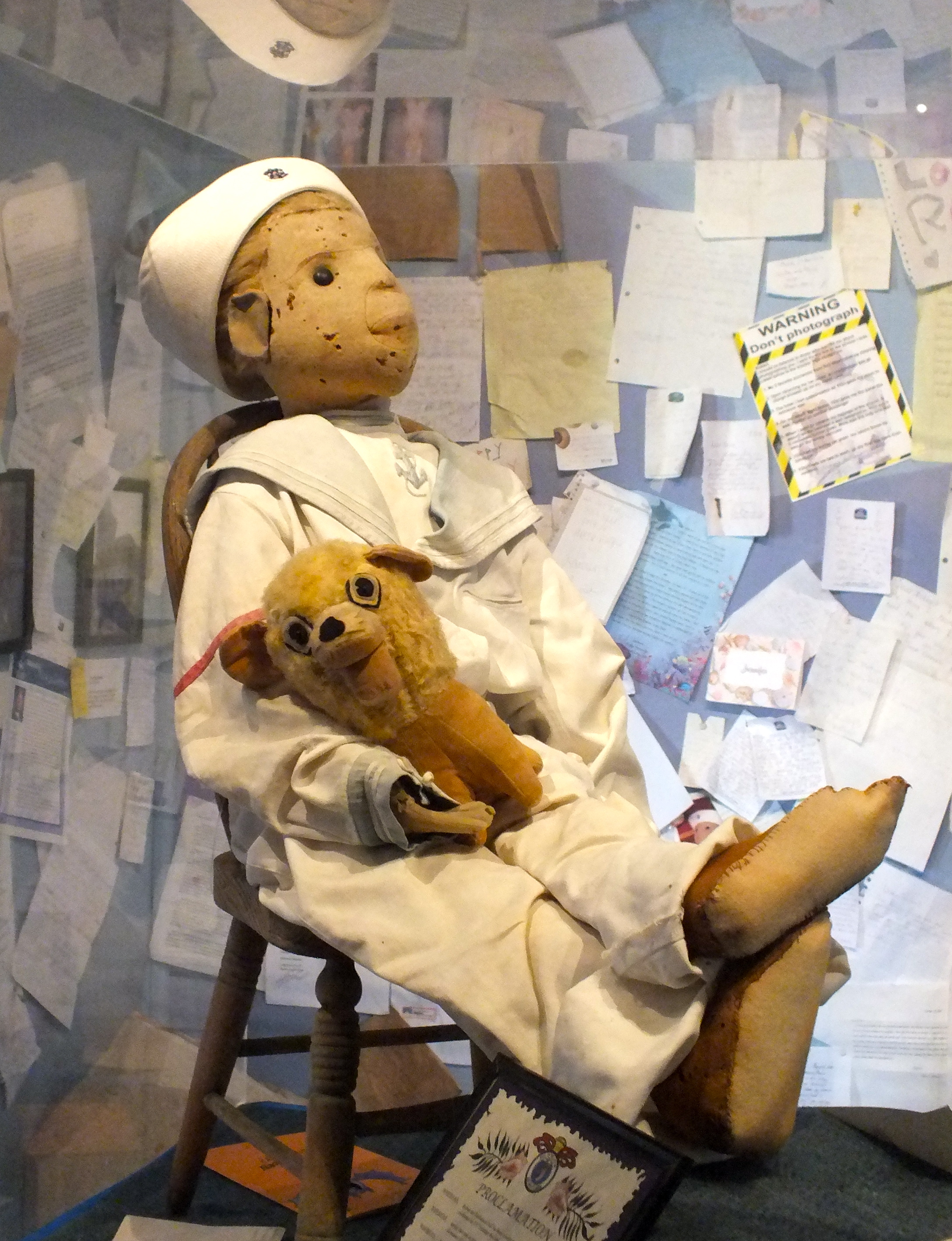

The fear of dolls, also known as pediophobia or glenophobia, is a specific phobia of human-like toys for children, mannequins, and ventriloquist's dummies; it may also transfer to other human-like models, such as wax figures. To be considered a phobia, the fear must be "persistent, intense, and out of proportion to the threat".

Fear of dolls has been exploited through horror films such as Child's Play and The Conjuring, both of which feature evil dolls.

== Etymology ==
Fear of dolls is commonly referred to as pediophobia. The term comes from the "Greek paidion, meaning little child". In writing of a patient with a fear of dolls, James Briscoe termed the condition glenophobia, from a Greek word often translated as "eyeball", as well as "doll or plaything".

== Reason ==
Fear of or discomfort regarding dolls is often related to their uncanny appearance in relation to people, with realistic dolls being perceived as more unsettling than those that are less lifelike. Common concerns focus on the doll's eyes, which may make the individual feel as though they are being stared at; the lifeless eyes may also be considered akin to those of a corpse. Some state that dolls' static nature may imitate death. Individuals may also focus on the material made to make the doll, with an aversion for dolls made of more fragile material, such as porcelain or china. Other distressing features include the doll's hair, fingers, and limbs.

Individuals may also experience a fear of or discomfort regarding dolls due to their anthropomorphization. In society, dolls and other play things may be treated as if alive; this is common in childhood, though a trend also exists among collectors and creators of hyperrealistic reborn dolls. Some have specifically stated concerns regarding revenge. For example, if the individual were to stop playing with a doll or throw it away, the doll may act in a vengeful way to cause them harm.

Some individuals cite the historical use of dolls when describing their fears. For instance, dolls were previously used as a way to memorialize children who had died. Other highlight how dolls have been used in voodooism and other ritualistic practices.

As with other specific phobias, fear of dolls may develop from negative prior experiences.

== Treatment ==
Although a dislike for dolls may be common, people usually do not experience doll-related anxiety to the degree that it interferes with their functioning.

Treatment for the fear of dolls focuses on reducing the individual's fear so that it does not interfere with daily functioning. Exposure therapy, where individuals are exposed to dolls in increasing increments, is common. Other treatments include cognitive behavioral therapy and/or anti-anxiety medication.

== In popular media ==
Popular media has exploited people's fear of or dislike of dolls. However, some argue that the rise of villainous dolls in media may cause unease and fear of dolls.

American film director John R. Leonetti explained why dolls are commonly used in horror films: "If you think about them, most dolls are emulating a human figure. But they’re missing one big thing, which is emotion. So they’re shells. It’s a natural psychological and justifiable vehicle for demons to take it over. If you look at a doll in its eyes, it just stares. That’s creepy. They’re hollow inside. That space needs to be filled."

Dolls are used in multiple ways in media to provoke fear or unease. In some cases, an individual acts through or as a doll, and in others, a doll comes to life. Some stories also feature characters being turned into dolls.

=== Films ===
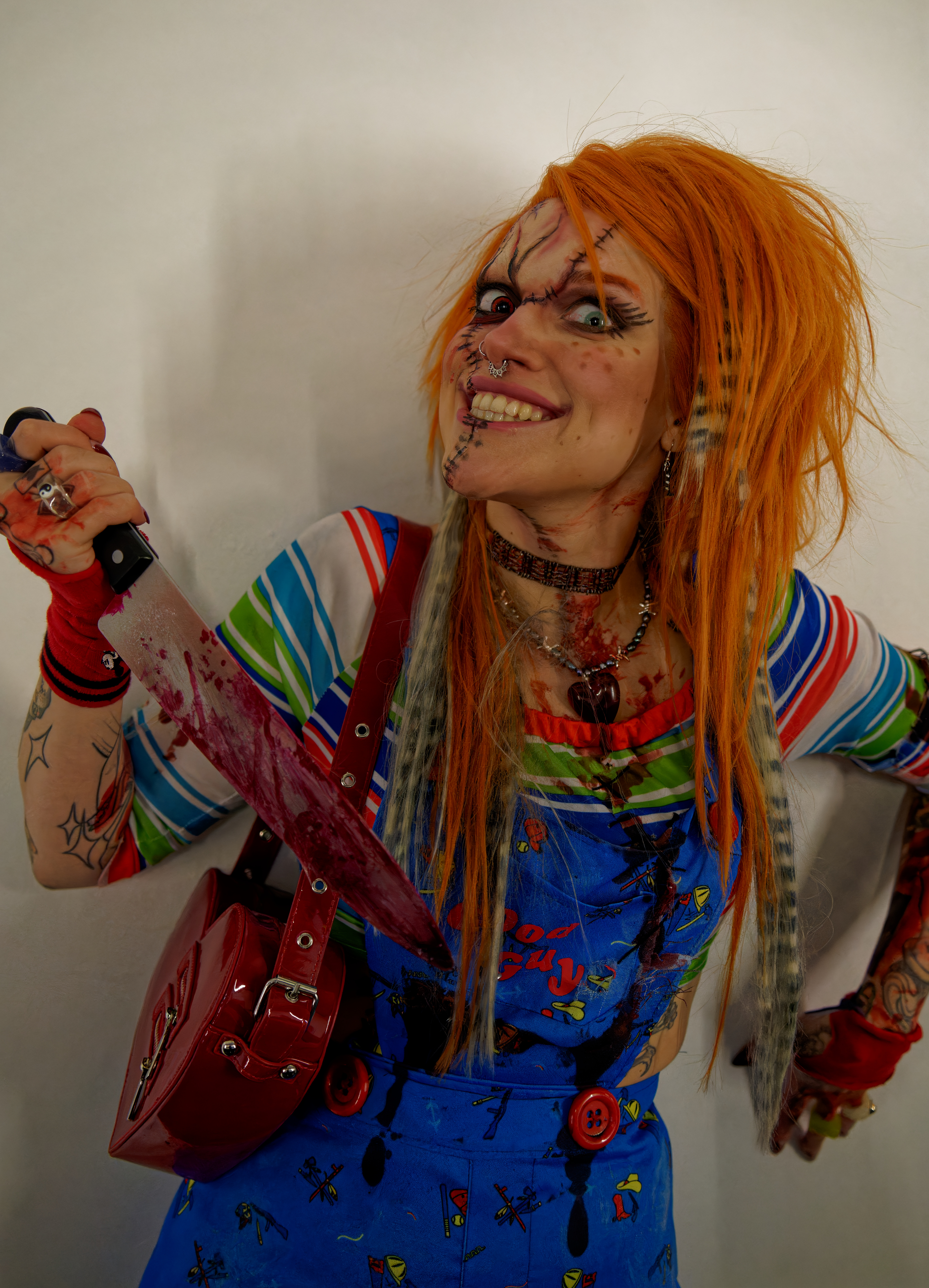
Woman cosplaying the Chucky doll

Fear of dolls has been exploited through horror films.

The 1963 film The Devil-Doll involves Lionel Barrymore, a "man wrongly convicted of murder", transforming two people "into doll-sized assassins to wreak his revenge on the men who framed him".

In the Child's Play franchise, a notorious serial killer frequently escapes death by performing a voodoo ritual to transfer his soul into a "Good Guy" doll named Chucky. A later film, Bride of Chucky, includes the doll character Tiffany Valentine, who is also a serial killer.

In The Conjuring franchise, Ed and Lorraine Warren, renowned demonologists, investigate the Annabelle case, in which friends Debbie and Camilla have a possessed doll. They allowed a spirit, who claimed to be a seven-year-old girl named Annabelle Higgins, to possess the doll, and the hauntings became increasingly disturbing.

Other notable horror films featuring dolls include Blood Dolls, The Boy, Demonic Toys, Dolly Dearest, Doll Graveyard, and Poltergeist.

Fear of dolls may also extend to fear of puppets and ventriloquist dummies. In this case, Billy the Puppet, a puppet from the Saw franchise, may also be considered under the fear of dolls. Further, the 2007 film Dead Silence features a homicidal ventriloquist dummy.

=== Novels ===
Fear of dolls has been exploited through novels, such as in Barbara Early's Murder on the Toy Town Express. Other notable horror novels featuring dolls include The Doll and One Other by Algernon Blackwood, and The Girl from the Well by Rin Chupeco.

Extending the fear of dolls to ventriloquist dummies, Slappy the Dummy is a villain in the Goosebumps book series. William Goldman’s 1976 psychological thriller Magic also features a ventriloquist dummy.

=== Television ===
Fear of dolls has been exploited through television. For example, The Twilight Zone included an episode in 1963 that featured a doll named Talky Tina, inspired by the Chatty Cathy doll. Talky Tina comes to life and harasses the owner's stepfather.

Popular media may also utilize fear of dolls by including specific scenes that showcase a large number of dolls. For example, the 1985 British television series Maelström repeatedly shows dolls in an unsettling manner.

== See also ==
- Fear of clowns
- Automatonophobia
- Haunted doll
- The Haunted Dolls' House
- Pollock's Toy Museum
- Robert (doll)
