= David Massey =

David Massey may refer to:

- David Massey (author), British novelist
- David Massey (director), American filmmaker
- David Massey (music executive), American record executive
- David B. Massey (born 1959), American mathematician
