= Poison (Wooding novel) =

2003 young adult fantasy novel by Chris Wooding

- First edition
- Author: Chris Wooding
- Cover artist: Tim Edmonds
- Language: English
- Genre: Fiction
- Publisher: Scholastic Ltd.
- Publication date: 2003
- Publication place: United Kingdom
- Pages: 273
- ISBN: 0-439-75571-9

Poison (2003) is a young adult English-language fantasy novel written by Chris Wooding, published in 2003. It is a highly metafictional novel which follows the adventures of a young (sixteen-year-old) female protagonist named Poison as she attempts to rescue her sister from the Phaerie Realm. It contains many intertextual references particularly to mythology, fairy tales and secondary world fantasy (i.e. a story about a world in which magic works without any connection to the "real" world) characteristics.

Wooding credits his travels through Europe, as the inspiration for Poison. He says of the novel:

"It can be read one level as a weird, gruesome kind of fairy tale, but there's a lot more to it than that. I spent most of my time writing this novel worrying about whether anyone would 'get' it, or whether it would sound like some degenerate A-Level student's philosophical rant when it was all finished instead of the story it was supposed to be, but I think it all worked out fine in the end. I'm very happy with it, anyways. And at least I got to put all the folklore I studied at University to good use."

== Plot ==
Poison is the story of a rebellious human teenager living in the swamp town of Gull with her father, stepmother, and her baby sister Azalea. She struggles against the oppression in her life, particularly with her strained relationship with her Stepmother, Snapdragon. Her only friend in Gull is the old traveler, Fleet, who tells her tales of the old wars and phaeries and maintains that Poison has some of the “Old Blood” in her.

On Soulswatch Eve, Azalea is replaced with a Changeling. After consulting with Fleet, Poison sets out from Gull to rescue her from the Phaerie Lord. She pays the Wraith-Catcher Bram to take her to Shieldtown to seek out the creature Lamprey, to whom Fleet has referred her. Once in Shieldtown, Poison encounters a young woman heading back to Gull and asks her to relay a message to her parents. After proving herself to Lamprey, Poison is sent to the home of the Bone Witch.

In chapters fairly reminiscent of Hansel and Gretel, Poison enters the house of the Bone Witch. She meets another young woman named Peppercorn, who keeps house for the blind, old witch. Peppercorn is unwilling to help Poison (aside from hiding her one night), and so it is with Bram’s help that Poison defeats the witch. Bram and Poison escape the house with Peppercorn and her highly intelligent cat Andersen.

The quartet meet a fisherman named Myrrk, who hints that all is not what it seems in the phaerie realm. He sends them on their way to the phaerie Lord’s castle. Once there, Poison strikes a deal with Aelthar the phaerie Lord that he will return Azalea to her if she obtains a dagger for him. This deal sends her and her companions into the castle of the spider woman Asinastra. She obtains the dagger and returns to Aelthar, where she learns that he has no intention of returning her sister.

Angered by Aelthar’s deception, Poison and her companions journey to the meeting of the lords at the Hierophant’s castle. There, they reunite with Fleet. Fleet, we learn, is an Antiquarian: a human who seeks out stories of interest and value for the Hierophant to transcribe.

Upon learning that the Hierophant has created all that the world is and every person in it, Poison tries to fight her role in the story by doing nothing and stagnating the plot line. As Poison tries to fight her own destiny by refusing to live it, everyone around her begins to weaken and deteriorate. After Bram reasons with her that the story she is in is actually about her, since her malaise seems to be what is causing everyone to deteriorate around her, Poison's realization that she can fight against the Hierophant by doing nothing is enough for her to get well enough to continue her story. As she recovers she begins thinking of ways to get back at the Hierophant and stop his control over her.

As Poison recovered from her illness, it is revealed that the Hierophant has been murdered with the dagger Poison acquired for Aelthar. The lords of the varying realms are in an uproar, as the death of the Hierophant means that a successor must take his place; each realm wants the new Hierophant to be of their own realm. Aelthar is particularly determined.

Poison discovers that he, by way of the Scarecrow, the phaerie creature who replaces children with changelings, has been breeding phaerie-human hybrids, as humans are the only species with imaginations and therefore best suited to become Hierophant. Aelthar shows Poison her own sister, Azaelea, now a teenager, whom he had sent home after deeming her unsuitable. Poison realizes that the girl she sent back to Gull with word of her journey was, in fact, her rapidly aged sister. Deprived of her quest, Poison is furious and determined to get revenge.

Aelthar sets the Scarecrow after her among the Hierophant's archives, and she kills it. Scriddle, Aelthar's assistant, stabs her. The world starts to rapidly dissolve around Poison, and she grins through the blood, announcing that she has realized that she is the new Hierophant. Scriddle does not believe her and continues to stab her trying to take her throne, as he does, the world becomes less real. In a panic and desperate for survival, the Hierophant's widow Lady Pariasa kills Scriddle by stabbing him through the neck, screaming that she wants to live.

Poison blacks out from blood loss, but is saved by her companions and revived. She embraces her new role as Hierophant as her companions disperse. Just as the last Hierophant wrote his own story, she begins to write hers.

== Main characters ==
Poison: The 16-year-old, violet eyed protagonist who is "a willful, contrary girl, prone to being argumentative and stubborn." Poison's original name was Foxglove, but she renamed herself in her coming-of-age ceremony to spite her step-mother Snapdragon, who once called her such. She embarks on an adventure to save her sister, Azalea, who has been stolen by the phaeries.

Fleet: Poison's mentor in Gull, who tells her stories about the world outside of the Black Marshes and the Phaerie World from his own experiences. He is secretly an Antiquarian, who has been following Poison's story.

Azalea: Poison's three-year-old sister, who is taken at the beginning of the novel by the Phaerie called the Scarecrow.

Bram: A wraith-catcher, who comes to Gull to collect their marsh wraiths for a profit. He reluctantly takes Poison to Shieldtown, but ends up being Poison's companion throughout the novel.

Peppercorn: A naive girl who lives under the tyranny of Maeb, the Bone-Witch, with her cat, Andersen. Poison and Bram take Peppercorn from the Bone-Witch's house. She and Andersen join Poison and Bram in the adventure to find Azalea.

Andersen: Peppercorn's cat, who is often called unnatural by Bram because of his ability to communicate with everyone and navigate through both the human realm and the Phaerie realm.

Maeb, The Bone-Witch: Her house sits on the gateway between the Phaerie and human realm and, though she is blind and deaf, uses her sense of smell and her two dogs to capture those who use her house to move between realms.

Lady Asinastra: The lady of cobwebs, ruler of the realm of spiders, half woman, half spider, possess spider-like powers.

Aelthar: The Phaerie King, who views humans as amusing animals with an extreme sense of self-importance, sets Poison on a quest to the Spider Queen, Lady Asinastra.

Scriddle: Aelthar's assistant, who is half-human, half-Phaerie, and who later tries to put himself in the role of Hierophant.

Melcheron, the Hierophant: A human and the lead Antiquarian, who controls the rules and destiny of most peoples in all of the realms.

Pariasa: The Hierophant's beautiful wife and Mistress of the Aeriads. She later betrays Melcheron and becomes Scriddle's lover as he attempts to take the role of Hierophant.

== Reception ==
=== Awards ===
Lancashire Children's Book of the Year 2004

Dracula Society The Children of the Night Award 2003

American Library Association Top Ten Best Books for Young Adults 2006

=== Nominations ===
Carnegie Medal 2004

=== Reviews ===
This fantasy, set in various realms—human (lowest in the pecking order), phaerie and arachnid—utilises many fantasy and folkloric tropes in original and often amusing ways. - Kirkus Reviews 2005.

"In a novel almost unparalleled for density an invention, each scene of danger sings with tension. Lovers of adventure, horror, and suspense should keep an eye on this talented author" - Horn Book.

"Wooding’s serpentine plotting and lush, imaginative writing have something to offer" - Booklist “Wooding again weaves a dark tale just beyond what readers might expect... fans of fairy tales with a dark side will shiver a freeze with fear" - VOYA.
