= Storm Thief =

2006 novel by Chris Wooding

- First edition
- Author: Chris Wooding
- Language: English
- Genre: Science fiction/ Young adult/ Adventure
- Publisher: Scholastic Books
- Publication date: 2006
- Publication place: United Kingdom
- Media type: Print (Hardback)

Storm Thief is a 2006 dystopian science-fiction novel written by Chris Wooding and published by Scholastic Books. It also has elements of the Gothic, tech-punk, and alternate history genres. It is set on a futuristic island-city known as Orokos, which is plagued by deadly "probability storms." It features a group of outcasts on the run, a mysterious artifact, a golem with a shadowed past, an underground resistance movement, a corrupt government, the downfall of two civilizations, and a seabird. The novel displays a number of literary themes, including fate, free will, and redemption. It received recognition as a 2007 Best Book for Young Adults from the American Library Association.

== Plot summary ==
The book opens with a scene of a seabird flying through the clouds. It falls out of the sky with exhaustion and crashes through a window, dying, where it is found by a strange golem-like creature. Then later that day in the other side of Orokos in the ghettos, the two protagonists, Rail and Moa, are sent on a mission to steal from the hideous creatures called Mozgas. They sneak through a large building and find a small box with different sorts of treasure within. Rail also finds an artifact that is known to be Fade-Science. They manage just to escape from the Mozgas and report back to the obese thief mistress Anya-Jacana. Rail debates about whether to give her the Fade Science but chooses not to. They depart and leave for their small living place. Anya-Jacana sends a small group of boys, led by her favorite, Finch, to get the artifact off them. They arrive soon enough and Rail and Moa are trapped. Moa then puts the artifact on her hand and manages to go through the wall behind them. She pulls Rail through just as the gang enters. They discover the artifact can open 'doors' through solid objects. As Rail and Moa escape, they meet a golem named Vago. He had escaped from his own master after getting beaten. The three proceed to discover the truth behind their unjust society.

== Characters ==
- Rail is willful and highly protective of Moa. Rail was left without functioning lungs after one particularly bad probability storm. Therefore Rail must constantly rely on a respirator given to him by the Thief master Anya-Jacanca, in return for his services as a thief. Rail believes his duty is to protect unassuming, naive Moa from the roughness of the ghetto, a job he carries out dutifully. He is highly distrustful of Vago, but allows him to stay with them because he is so important to Moa. At the end of the book, it becomes apparent that Rail has romantic feelings for Moa, and vice versa.
- Moa is Rail's best friend and helps him steal things for Anya-Jacana. She is sickly and weak, and depends heavily on Rail for her own survival. She strikes up a friendship with the golem, Vago. Moa is convinced that there is more to the world beyond Orokos, though Rail does not and even scorns her convictions. The more feeling of the two, Moa tends to follow her heart more than her head, a tendency that gets her and her friends into trouble more than once. She loves Rail very much, although she's not always sure in which way.
- Vago is a golem, half man half machine. He was created by the Protectorate Chief of Police, Lysander Bane, to be a super soldier against Revenants. He was created to be a prototype and was a murderer named Tukor Kep before he lost his memories in the surgery. As he is about to finish his programming a probability storm takes him from the laboratory and places him in the home of the toy maker, Cretch. Cretch abuses Vago because Vago reminds him of a granddaughter he lost to the same storm. Vago finally has a moment where he snaps and attacks Cretch during a beating. He is later found by Rail and Moa. He wants to stay with Moa and protect her but doesn't like to be around Rail. He is eventually caught by the Secret police who program him to hate ghetto people. Vago almost murders Moa but his former compassion for her overrides his new programming. At the end of the book, Vago is willing to sacrifice himself to allow Rail and Moa escape from Orokos.

== Citations ==
Chris Wooding, Storm Thief, 2006, Scholastic
