= Cynthia Murphy (writer) =

English writer

- Born: Cynthia Mary Power; 6 January 1984 (age 42); Bury, Greater Manchester, England
- Years active: 2020–present
- Spouse: Luke Murphy
- Website: www.cynthiamurphy.co.uk

Cynthia Mary Murphy (née Power; born 6 January 1984) is an English author of young adult (YA) thrillers. Her first three novels won Lancashire Book of the Year three years in a row.

== Early life and education ==
Murphy was born to Irish parents and grew up in Whitefield, Greater Manchester.

Murphy attended St Monica's High School in Prestwich. She pursued a degree in Art History and Archaeology at university. In 2015, she took the Curtis Brown Children's & YA Fiction writing course in 2015.

== Career ==
Murphy began her career as a primary schoolteacher in both the state and private sectors at Old Hall Primary School in Bury, Clevelands Preparatory School in Bolton and Bury Grammar School. She made three attempts at publication prior to her successful fourth attempt.

Via a two-book deal in 2020, Scholastic UK acquired the rights to publish Murphy's debut young adult (YA) novel Last One to Die in 2021. Last One to Die won Lancashire Book of the Year among other accolades.

This was followed by Murphy's second novel Win Lose Kill Die in 2022, which also won Lancashire Book of the Year. After being discovered on TikTok, Win Lose Kill Die had a U.S. publication in 2023 via Delacorte Press. Also in 2022, Murphy began hosting the writing podcast Delete My Browser History with Georgia Bowers.

Murphy's next two Scholastic UK titles were The Midnight Game in 2023 and Signed Sealed Dead in 2024. Also in 2023, she published her fifth novel Welcome to Camp Killer via Barrington Stoke. The Midnight Game won Murphy's third Lancashire Book of the Year accolade.

In November 2024, Murphy signed two three-book deals with Penguin Books in the UK and Delacorte Press in the U.S respectively, through which she published Keep Your Friends Close in 2025 and Paint Me Like Your Dead Girls in 2026.

== Personal life ==
Murphy has a husband Luke. In 2016, she was diagnosed with breast cancer.

== Bibliography ==
=== Novels ===
- Last One to Die (2021)
- Win Lose Kill Die (2022)
- The Midnight Game (2023)
- Welcome to Camp Killer (2023)
- Signed Sealed Dead (2024)
- Keep Your Friends Close (2025)
- Paint Me Like Your Dead Girls (2026)
- Clandestine (July 2027)

=== Short stories ===
- "Till Death Do Us Part" in A Taste of Darkness: 13 Spooky Stories to Savour (2023) edited by Amy McCaw and Maria Kuzniar

== Accolades ==
Year	Award	Category	Title	Result	Ref.
. 2022	Wirral Book Award		Last One to Die	Won	
. 2022	Lancashire Book of the Year		Last One to Die	Won	
. 2022	Redhill Academy Trust Book Awards		Last One to Die	Won	
2023	RED Book Award		Last One to Die	Won	
2023	Cheshire Schools' Book Award	Older age	Win Lose Kill Die	Pending	
2023	Lancashire Book of the Year		Win Lose Kill Die	Won	
2024	Lancashire Book of the Year		The Midnight Game	Won	
2026	Wessex Amazing Book Award		Keep Your Friends Close	Won	
2026	Trafford Book Award		Keep Your Friends Close	Won	
