= Lancashire Book of the Year =

Annual children's book award

The Lancashire Book of the Year (previously Lancashire Children's Book of the Year), established in 1987, is an award given to works of children's literature, voted for by a panel of young judges. The award is run by Lancashire County Council's library service and sponsored by the University of Central Lancashire.

== Winners ==
Lancashire Book of the Year prize winners
Year	Author	Title	Note	Ref.
1987	Philip Pullman	The Ruby in the Smoke		
1988	Brian Jacques	Redwall		
1989	Anthony Horowitz	Groosham Grange		
1990	Jean Ure	Plague 99		
1991	Brian Jacques	Mattimeo		
1992	Robin Jarvis	The Whitby Witches		
1993	Robert Westall	Gulf		
1993	Brian Jacques	Salamandastron		
1994	Ian Strachan	The Boy in the Bubble		
1995	Garry Kilworth	The Electric Kid		
1996	Frances Mary Hendry	Chandra		
1997	Elizabeth Hawkins	Sea of Peril		
1998	Elizabeth Laird	Jay		
1999	Nigel Hinton	Out of the Darkness		
2000	Tim Bowler	Shadows		
2001	Melvin Burgess	Bloodtide	Joint winner	
2001	Malcolm Rose	Plague	Joint winner	
2002	Malorie Blackman	Noughts & Crosses		
2003	Julie Bertagna	Exodus		
2004	Chris Wooding	Poison		
2005	Jonathan Stroud	The Amulet of Samarkand		
2006	Anthony Horowitz	Raven's Gate		
2007	Robert Muchamore	Divine Madness		
2008	Tim Lott	Fearless		
2009	Sophie McKenzie	Blood Ties	First place	
2009	Michelle Magorian	Just Henry	Second place	
2009	Sarah Wray	The Trap	Third place	
2010	Narinder Dhami	Bang, Bang, You're Dead		
2011	Keren David	When I Was Joe		
2012	Chris Higgins	He's After Me		
2013	David Massey	Torn		
2014	Cat Clarke	Undone		
2015	Sarah Mussi	Riot		
2016	Holly Bourne	Am I Normal Yet		
2017	Natalie Flynn	The Deepest Cut		
2018	Sue Wallman	See How They Lie		
2019	Sarah Crossan	Moonrise		
2020	Samuel Pollen	The Year I Didn't Eat		
2021	Ben Oliver	The Loop		
2022	Cynthia Murphy	Last One To Die		
2023	Cynthia Murphy	Win Lose Kill Die		
2024	Cynthia Murphy	The Midnight Game		
2025	A J Clack	Lie Or Die		
2026	Ravena Guron	Mondays Are Murder		
