= Braided Path =

Trilogy of fantasy novels by Chris Wooding

The Braided Path is a trilogy of fantasy novels by British writer Chris Wooding. The series starts with The Weavers of Saramyr, released in 2004, which was Wooding's first adult fantasy book. This is reflected in the book not just in the style of writing, but also in the graphic scenes as well. The second book, The Skein of Lament, was published in 2004, while The Ascendancy Veil was published in 2005 to end the trilogy.

The story encompasses a mix of low and high fantasy settings as well as romantic, political, and fantasy themes.

== Novels ==
- The Weavers of Saramyr: The story follows the character of Kaiku as she sets off to find out why her family was murdered. Pursued by all manner of demonic creatures, Kaiku soon discovers her family's death was a repercussion of something much bigger and is thrown into a world of mystery and political intrigue.
- The Skein of Lament: A war is brewing in the empire of Saramyr and in the centre of it all is the young and delicate Lucia. Blessed or hindered, she does not know which, with the ability to talk to spirits, she must go on a journey of self-discovery and the state of the empire depends on the path she takes.
- The Ascendancy Veil: The war has been in motion now for a few years. Armies of horribly mutated creatures, known as Aberrants, are plaguing city streets. Slowly the apocalypse is coming. It is up to Kaiku, Lucia and friends to stop the impending doom and restore peace to the empire.
