= Malice (novel series) =

2009 novel series by Chris Wooding

- Cover for book 1
- Malice, Havoc
- Author: Chris Wooding
- Illustrator: Dan Chernett
- Cover artist: Alison Padley
- Country: United States
- Language: English
- Genre: Sci-Fi / Horror
- Publisher: Scholastic Press
- Published: October 2009 – October 2010
- Media type: Print

Malice is a two-book young adult series that was written by British author Chris Wooding and illustrated by Dan Chernett. The first book, Malice, was released on October 1, 2009, and the second work, Havoc, was released in October of the following year.

After the release of the first book Wooding announced that there was interest in a film adaptation of the series and in January 2010, announced that a first draft of the script had been written. In the comments section on his website during 2012 Wooding later remarked that there was no progress on the film and the movie was considered to be "dead in the water".

== Synopsis ==
The book begins with Luke and Heather at Luke's house with Luke trying to summon Tall Jake, a creature from another world called Malice. When Luke succeeds in summoning Tall Jake, his friends Seth and Kady go looking for him. Discovering the comic entitled Malice, an idea forms in Seth and Kady's minds: Malice is real. After some thought, Seth decides that the only way to find out the truth is to go into Malice itself. When Kady finds out that Seth went to Malice, she decides to do some investigating and finds out that she has been to Malice herself and that her mom, a professional hypnotist, hypnotized her with fake memories of being in San Francisco. She then goes to Malice and finds Seth and his newfound friend Justin.

== Bibliography ==
1. Malice (2009)
2. Havoc (2010)

== Reception ==
Critical reception for the series has been mostly positive. Publishers Weekly and School Librarian have both praised the series, with Publishers Weekly praising the first book for its "interspersed sections where comic book panels replace textual narrative (as well as the three-dimensional cover)", which they felt made it "a memorable multimedia experience". Kirkus Reviews gave a mixed review for Malice, but was more positive in their review for Havoc, calling it "A real crowd pleaser, with further episodes possible but not necessary."
