= The Haunting of Alaizabel Cray =

2004 novel by Chris Wooding

- First edition
- Author: Chris Wooding
- Cover artist: Les Edwards
- Language: English
- Genre: Steampunk
- Publisher: Scholastic
- Publication date: 1 August 2004
- Publication place: United Kingdom
- Media type: Paperback
- Pages: 304
- ISBN: 978-0-439-96395-4
- Dewey Decimal: 823.92

The Haunting Of Alaizabel Cray (2004) is a Gothic steampunk horror/alternate history novel by Chris Wooding about a young man and an amnesiac girl fighting a cult in an alternate Victorian era London.

== Plot ==
The story is set in a Victorian London overrun by demonic creatures called Wych-kin. While out hunting for Wych-kin in the abandoned regions of the city, Thaniel Fox is attacked by a girl in a confused state. Thaniel leaves her under the protection of his old family friend Cathaline Bennett and begins making inquiries at the mental wards run by Dr. Mammon Pyke. After meeting with Dr. Pyke, Thaniel suspects Pyke is lying to him for unknown reasons. During the girl's slow recovery, it becomes apparent that she has no memory of her past life apart from her name: Alaizabel Cray.

Alaizabel has been tattooed with a Chackh'morg, a symbol which leaves her open to spirit possession by an entity called Thatch. When a Wych-kin almost kidnaps Alaizabel, Thaniel and Cathaline realise they can no longer hide. They take her to a beggar lord called Crott, who owes them a favour. Crott uncovers someone who knows about Alaizabel's past: Perris The Boar. Perris tells them that Alaizabel was used by the Fraternity, an evil cult bent on world destruction and led by Dr. Mammon Pyke. The Fraternity killed her parents and placed the spirit of Thatch inside her.

While consulting Crott, Thaniel meets Inspector Carver, who has been investigating a series of ritual killings known as the Green Tack Murders. They map out the sites of each killing and discover that the killings form the shape of the Chackh'morg. The Fraternity's ultimate plan is to use the killings to open a dimensional portal and allow London to be overrun by ancient gods called the Glau Meska. While trying to save the final Green Tack victim, Thaniel realises that the culprit is a Wych-kin called Rawhead, summoned by the Fraternity to carry out the killings.

The Fraternity kidnap Alaizabel, remove Thatch from her body, and leave her for dead. She escapes but is captured by a crazed killer called Stitch-face, who later has mercy and returns her to Thaniel.

Inspector Carver comes up with a plan to stop the Fraternity from completing their evil scheme by invading their base and killing Lady Thatch, the only one who knows how to summon the Glau Meska. The group travels by airship to the Fraternity's headquarters, a forgotten cathedral hidden in South London. When they reach the Fraternity's castle, Alaizabel reveals that she has retained some of Lady Thatch's memories and is able to gain access to their base. Thaniel and Alaizabel battle their way through the cathedral and find Lady Thatch. Along the way, they encounter Dr. Pyke, who tells them of the true nature of the Wych-kin and how they came to exist. Pyke escapes, but Thaniel is able to kill Thatch just as Thatch is about to finish the spell that would have awoken the Glau Meska. The Wych-kin are all destroyed and the Fraternity has been defeated.

A subplot concerns the activities of the serial killer Stitch-face, who is at one point suspected of being the Green Tack murderer.

== Reception ==
The Haunting of Alaizabel Cray went on to win the Silver Award and the Nestlé Smarties Book Prize in 2001. It also received rave reviews from The Times, Daily Telegraph, Teen Terrain.com, and Bookseller.

Kirkus Reviews called the book "an excellent mélange of horror, suspense, and the gothic." Their 2010 review complimented the "complex plotting and structure," as well as "rich, atmospheric world-building".

== Film adaptation ==
On his website, the author stated that he had been asked to write a Haunting of Alaizabel Cray movie.

In the process of drafting and redrafting I changed the story around, mostly to make it work better as a movie, partly because I was tired of telling the same story the same way. The heart of it is still there, but the movie, when it gets made, will be quite a bit different from the book. That'll annoy any purists there might be out there.
