= The Bone Witch =

Novel by Rin Chupeco

- First edition
- Author: Rin Chupeco
- Language: English
- Genre: Young adult
- Publisher: Sourcebooks Fire
- Publication date: February 2017
- Media type: Print (hardback)
- ISBN: 1492635820

The Bone Witch is a young adult fantasy novel written by Rin Chupeco. Published in February 2017, it is the first novel of Chupeco's second series. It was followed by two sequels: The Heart Forger in 2018 and The Shadowglass in 2019.

The Bone Witch follows Tea, a teen with the ability to raise the dead, who finds herself caught in a struggle for power as she explores her newfound abilities after she accidentally resurrects her late brother.

== Development ==
Chupeco says that their writing often is very experimental, mixing different styles and themes, which led to them writing The Bone Witch in order to tell the story of characters in two different time periods. The Bone Witch series was inspired by Filipino witch doctors, mangkukulam, who are reviled by the general public yet approached when in need of help, similar to the dark asha in her series. They also drew on Middle Eastern folklore and influences, like the Ayyubid dynasty and Wahhabism. The witch aspect was inspired by real-life geisha.

== Reception ==
The Bone Witch received starred reviews from Shelf Awareness and Publishers Weekly.

== Sequels ==
In the sequel, The Heart Forger, published in February 2018, Tea finds herself bound to a mythical dragon-like creature and embarks on a quest to find a cure. It received starred reviews from Booklist and Foreword Reviews.

In the last novel in the series, The Shadowglass, Tea faces off with her resurrected brother while searching for a way to make him immortal for good. It was published in March 2019.
