= Broken Sky =

Fantasy novel series by Chris Wooding

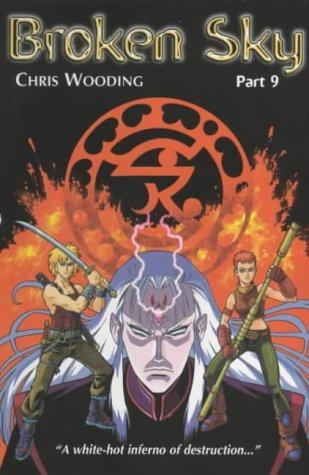
Book Cover for Part 9 Featuring Ryushi, King Macaan, and Kia.

Broken Sky is a novel series that draws on anime influence, and was written by Chris Wooding between the years 1999 and 2001. Originally planned to be released as a series of twenty-seven books (three nine-part acts) of 80 to 100 pages each, the plans were changed following the release of Act One, Part Nine when - mostly to stop the books "being lost behind larger books on the shelves", as was stated on the old Broken Sky website - Chris Wooding and the publishers made a tactical decision to instead release the books as a series of nine.

Each single book in this "newer" form contained the equivalent of three parts and the release schedule continued as normal, starting with Book Four (Act Two, Parts 1-3) while the first act was re-released as Books One to Three. This decision, while making the books more visible, also resulted in the first nine original books becoming rare as they were effectively phased out by their re-released counterparts.

The story takes place across three years and focuses on the twin worlds of the Dominions and Kirin Taq, which are widely seen as parallel universes, and deals with issues of race relations, resistance movements and the coming of age of its main characters, Ryushi and Kia.

== Plot ==
The story revolves around the journeys and trials of twins Ryushi and Kia. Forced to flee from their home during a violent and seemingly unprovoked attack by the forces of the King they adored, they are pressed to reconsider their naive world-view caused by their sheltered upbringing as they are caught up in events beyond their control and larger than either of them imagined. What starts with an underground resistance soon develops into a full-fledged rebellion against the tyrannical King Macaan and his equally malicious daughter Aurin, with Kia, Ryushi and all those close to them at the center of it all.

== Setting ==
Taking place over three years in Ryushi and Kia's life (from age sixteen to eighteen), Broken Sky is set in the varied environs of two worlds: the Dominions, the world in which the twins reside, and Kirin Taq, a world existing in a normally undetectable parallel to their own.

As well as learning of Kirin Taq's existence over the course of the story, Ryushi and Kia also learn that gifted individuals known as Resonants - such as Elani - are able to jump between the two worlds at will, bringing objects and other people along with them. The name Broken Sky stems from a myth which postulates the theory that, many years ago, Kirin Taq and the Dominions existed on the same physical plane; effectively being a single world. The sky was then "split" - or broken - forcing the worlds to separate, though whether this is meant figuratively or literally is left unclear.

=== The Dominions ===
The Dominions - the collective name given to the regions ruled over by King Macaan - are a single, sun-bathed continent, with mountainous rocky plains to the north, arid deserts in the south, green steppes in the east, wind-swept craggy grasslands to the west and a fertile central mass. It is surrounded by a massive sea which sailors are unable to cross due to huge monsters destroying any ships that come near the world’s vast, uncharted ocean, referred to as Deepwater. The people of the Dominions are generally Caucasian, with an often tanned skintone resulting from the weather.

=== Kirin Taq ===
Kirin Taq is, in many respects, the polar opposite to the Dominions. Where the Dominions enjoys near-constant fair weather, Kirin Taq is a land beset by twilight due to its sun existing in a perpetual eclipse. Without the day/night cycle the denizens of the Dominions use to record the passage of time, the Kirins have resorted to utilising elements of the local flora and geology - namely the bioluminescent Glimmer Plant and Glowstones - in order to achieve the same goal.

Instead of being fair-skinned, the Kirins' outward physiology has evolved over time in response to their environment. Their skintones range from a deep, ashen grey to midnight blue, while their eyes are noticeably paler than those born in the Dominions. In addition to their unusual looks, the Kirins possess a naturally occurring form of nightvision; an adaptation prompted by the lack of natural light.

=== Netherfane ===
According to Elani, the interwoven nature of the Dominions and Kirin Taq is like the ticking of a clock, with each "beat" signifying the passage of a moment in each world and the act of jumping from one set of beats (the ticks) to the other (the tocks) is how she visualises the use of her ability.

However, a third plane is thought to exist. Dubbed the Netherfane, it is rumoured to be the home of the enigmatic Deliverers; the hooded ritualists who are the only ones capable of implanting spirit stones into the bodies of newborns. Like the Deliverers themselves, very little is known about the Netherfane and, due to many physical and temporal precepts not seeming to apply, the simple act of a mundane person gazing upon it is said to shatter the mind and cause insanity.

== Objects, Items, and Stones ==
=== Spirit Stones ===
While the societies in Broken Sky rely on various infrastructures for their survival, such as water or Tusami City's magma-based geothermal power, one commodity which appears to rule many facets of daily life is the Spirit Stone. Extracted by mining as an inert, colourless gemstone, the Spirit Stones only take on their characteristic colour after being implanted by a Deliverer during a ritualistic ceremony called the pah'nu'kah.

During the ritual, the Spirit Stones are implanted along the spine - specifically, in the voids between their vertebrae - of a newborn child, being partially phased into their bodies so that only one hemisphere is visible. Once the ritual is complete, both the stones and the child forge a connection with the ley lines - conduits of raw energy running beneath the earth - giving the stones a specific colour and the child command over a certain ability later in life.

With the stones themselves being incredibly expensive, possessing multiple Spirit Stones is often a defining trait of the wealthy but, despite this, people in the Dominions possess an average of two or three stones a piece. Being a renowned wyvern-breeder, Banto purchased a grand total of eighteen Spirit Stones; six for each of his children. Although "financially crippling", the power Ryushi, Kia and Takami have at their disposal is vastly in excess of the majority of people.

The situation in Kirin Taq, however, is completely different. In order to prevent rebellion, Princess Aurin - King Macaan's daughter and the ruler of Kirin Taq - outlawed the purchase and implantation of Spirit Stones, rendering the sight of them in the backs of the Kirin people a near-impossibility.

These colours include, but aren't limited to:

- Deep Red: Elemental Spirit Stones focusing on the control of earth. With these stones, a person is able to manipulate various forms of earth - such as soil, clay, stone and sand - to their will. Sinkholes, breaches in solid walls and even the creation and control of animated golems are well within their reach. Kia has six of these stones.
- Pale Blue – Elemental Spirit Stones focusing on the control of the air. With these stones, a person is able to alter and compress air currents, forming them into various applications of physical or concussive force. Depending on the level of force exerted, the feats possible with these Spirit Stones range from rudimentary telekinesis - such as turning a key or threading a needle without touching them - to defensive barriers to waves of annihilating force which can level forests. While Ryushi is the first example of a wielder of these Spirit Stones, many of the Royalist Guardsmen also have them.
- Black – Stones of construction, the bearers of which are immediately recruited into the Machinist's Guild. These people are able to build hi-tech machines that require massive amounts of energy obtainable only by a pilot. All Machinists have these stones.
- Green – Stones that grant an affinity with machines, as well as the power necessary to make them function; those with green stones are recruited into the Pilot's Guild. These people are capable of, generally single-handedly, powering and operating machines built by machinists. Ty, and all other Pilots, have these stones.
- Charcoal Black - Blacksmith stones, bearers of these are the best blacksmiths. Not that other people cannot become blacksmiths, but these stones give a 'natural' talent for it.
- Coloured Tiger Stripes – Also known as Noman Stones, so named because they appear to be a variety of stone unique to the Noman tribe, give the user the rare ability to manipulate the perceptions of others. Often used in various forms of obfuscating illusion, people who possess these stones can temporarily trick others into seeing them as someone they aren't or by rendering themselves "invisible". The drawbacks to this ability are tied to the number of people the wielder wishes to affect. While the people in question will be subject to the changes their illusions implement, other bystanders will see no change in their perceptions. Gerdi is the only Noman tribesman to appear in Broken Sky and, as such, is the only one to possess these stones.
- Silver – A rare variant of Spirit Stone which allow for symbiotic vision. Usually, the symbiotic connection is between a human (who has the stones implanted) and an animal, be it a pet or other lifelong companion. Unlike other Spirit Stones, where the ability in question is a one-way process, both the wielder and their symbiotic companion are able to utilise the ability; one which manifests as the capability of seeing through each other's eyes. Whist - and his Flicker Dog, Blink - are the only characters to possess this ability.
- Milky-white – These stones bestow the gift of psychometry on the user; allowing them to view associated events or emotions that have occurred from contact with an object, such as powerful memories or other times of heightened emotion in the objects presence or, ideally, when the object is touching the person’s skin. Calica possesses these stones.
- Various colors - Ethereal Fire: Allows the user to manipulate and create fire. Takami uses these stones in a manner similar to Ryushi, in the forms of shields and blasts.
- Yellow – A person who is given these yellow stones, enabling them to ‘heal’ another being by taking the damage onto themselves, are the healers of the desert tribes. Though yellow stones also increase the speed of their natural healing rate, they have limits to their restorative abilities and so those given these stones are taken after their pah'nu'kah into a monastery to learn how to use their ability without killing themselves.
- Purple and Grey – The stones of a torturer, they give a person the ability to inflict pain in others. The taskmasters of the mines in the Dominions, as well as their bosses, have these.
- Swirling Green and Black – These stones possess the power of chaos, entropy, destruction. They allow a person to utterly destroy whatever is around them (thereby causing ‘chaos’). Princess Aurin has these.
- White and Red – The stones of regeneration, they are used only when the host is badly wounded.

=== Trigger Stone ===
King Macaan has this purple stone in his forehead. Corresponding stones are placed in many of his subordinates, including the Jachyra and the Keriags. Using this stone, it takes a mere thought from him to wipe out any or all life connected to the trigger stone. This is generally used to keep rebellious or unwilling but useful servants/slaves under tight control.

=== Heartstone ===
The heartstone is a stone Princess Aurin wears around her neck. Somewhat similar to the trigger stone, it is used to control the Keriags. Lesser heartstones are implanted in all the Keriag Queens, and if Aurin takes it away from her pulse for more than a cycle, all the Keriags would die. Only one other person can wear the stone - Aurin's splitling, Calica.

=== Glowstones ===
Glowstones are stones that emanate light. They're used in place of electric lights in the world of Broken Sky. Mainly appearing in the Dominions, Kirin Taq usually makes do with lit torches or other kinds of brazier. They appear in both orange and white colours - the white stones are more expensive as they show colours as they really are.

=== Damper stones/collars ===
Damper stones are stones that limit the use of spirit stones near them. Like spirit stones, the more there are, the greater their effect. In large numbers, they can cancel out any use of spirit stones in a whole room. Usually, however, they are used alone, set into a metal collar but, in one instance, the damper stone is seen implanted into a slave miner's body at the nape of the neck; a few inches up from where their spirit stones would start. This lone stone, when touching the skin, is enough to dampen the spirit stone use of the person it touches and possibly anyone who comes too close.

=== The Communion ===
The Communion is possibly a stone, but we know it only as the glowing light in the Koth Macquai's chest. It contains all the memories of all the previous Macquais, and thus all of Koth Taraan history. It is always passed on to the oldest Koth Taraan.

=== Bonding Stone ===
A bonding stone, in looks, are somewhat akin to the Trigger Stone worn by King Macaan. However, unlike the Trigger Stone - which is purple, the bonding stone is a deep red. In its inert form, it takes the form of a prism-shaped diamond but, during its use, the bonding stone is split into two halves. One half is placed onto a person's forehead, while the other is placed onto the forehead of a wyvern, creating a bond between beast and rider. The only example of such a stone being used during the course of Broken Sky's story is by Ryushi to bond himself with his wyvern, Araceil.

== Organizations ==
=== Parakka ===
Parakka are a resistance movement set up to overthrow King Macaan from the Dominions, and Princess Aurin from Kirin Taq. They are led by a Council, which many of the main characters sit upon. Parakka starts off in the Dominions alone in a hidden base called Gar Jenna, with just one or two people situated in Kirin Taq. However, after their failed attempts at stopping the Integration (Macaan's plan to bring a Keriag invasion force to the Dominions using an artificial portal powered by enslaved Resonants), they flee to Kirin Taq, while Macaan and Princess Aurin believe they are dead. Here they begin recruiting among the Kirin people, and make their home in a barren, rocky area called the Rifts. They call their new home 'Base Usido'. Aurin soon learns of Parakka's transfer to Kirin Taq, and begins searching for them. In order to protect themselves against her forces, mainly the monstrous, spider-like Keriags, Kia and several other members of Parakka seek aid from the Koth Taraan. After a tenuous start, the Koth Taraan become staunch allies of Parakka. Eventually, Parakka become a main force in protecting the world after a crazed King Macaan invades the Machinists' Citadel, and activates the Pulse Hammer - attracting the huge monsters of the Deepwater onto land. Together with remnants of Macaan's forces, Parakka attempts to hold off the Deepwater monsters while Ryushi, Kia and the others head inside to reverse the Pulse Hammer's effects, driving the Deepwater monsters away, and stop Macaan once and for all. After the defeat of Macaan, Parakka was dissolved as it fulfilled its purpose of freeing the two worlds from the tyrant king.

=== The Guardsmen ===
Macaan's Guardsmen make up the bulk of his army. Aurin has the Keriags, but Macaan's Guardsmen are just as numerous. For many years it had been the rule that every child given 'force' spirit stones would be conscripted. Thus, Macaan's army is not only immense, but also unmatched in destructive power. They are loyal firstly to Macaan, even those under the command of Princess Aurin. However it was mentioned in the 2nd to last book that after the "death" of Aurin and the liberation of Kirin Taq by the Parakkans Macaan eventually began conscripting any male of serviceable age that led to a large number of his army deserting him before the final battle, and the negation of using halberds as cannons.

=== The Machinists ===
The Machinists are a coalition of mercenaries who work solely for the highest bidder, so as to finance more of their technological efforts in their Citadel (located in the Dominion plains). Machinist technology is used by nearly everyone, including King Macaan - from Augmentations to Resonants to create Jachyra, to large magma derricks to fuel Tusami City's energy needs, to physical Augmentations for the Machinists themselves. Machinists work in tandem with the Pilot's Guild, who provide the energy required to run all of the Machinists' piloted units. They eventually construct the Pulse Hammer, a design that is theoretically capable of repelling the creatures that live in Deepwater, allowing for traversing of the ocean. However, it is eventually used for the opposite - attracting the Deepwater monsters to wreak havoc.

== Peoples ==
=== Resonants ===
Resonants are not given spirit stones at all, and it is stated by Elani (see below) that Resonants cannot use spirit stones. Instead, they are able to shift between the worlds of Kirin Taq and the Dominions, and take along anyone they are touching. It is theorized that while spirit stones give control over certain things such as the earth, fire, memory or physical force, Resonants control time. According to Resonant theory, Kirin Taq exists between each second of The Dominions, just as The Dominions exists in between the time of Kirin Taq. The most prominent Resonant in the novels, Elani, refers to the two worlds as being a clock - the Dominions being the 'tick' and Kirin Taq the 'tock' of the pendulum. Macaan has been secretly gathering huge numbers of Resonants for many years. He uses a great number of these to cause the Integration - the setting up of huge 'Ley Warrens’ that allow mass transports of personnel and equipment between Kirin Taq and the Dominions.

=== The Jachyra ===
The Jachyra are Macaan's secret police. The general public know very little about them, and believe even less. They are, according to popular myth, invisible and always watching you - so even if people did believe all the tales, it would only help Macaan's cause, as they would think they are always being watched. In fact, the myths aren't too far off. The Jachyra can see and travel through mirrors, or any other decently reflective surface. They were once Resonants, but after being augmented by the Machinists, are no longer able to shift between worlds. It has been theorized that the manipulation of their bodies has also manipulated their powers. They are no longer whole in body, being made mostly of metal augmentations to make them fast and deadly. Covered in rags, not many people have seen just how much they have changed. The Jachyra, however, unlike the Guardsmen, hate Macaan. He made them into monsters, and they hate him for it. But thanks to the trigger stone in his forehead, Macaan retains complete control - he has to merely think it, and they would all die, due to being implanted with stones connected to the trigger stone. While this may not be such a loss to many of them, who feel their lives are already long over, the glimmer of humanity left in them prevents them from forcing Macaan to kill them off. They are led by Macaan's favourite Tatterdemalion. Not only does he have an extremely appropriate name, he is one of the only Jachyra that there is any development or exposition on. He later is replaced by his lesser, Vore.

== Creatures ==
=== Koth Taraan ===
They are an ancient race, sharing the same ancestry as the Keriags. They are large, bulky and heavily armoured. Because of this, they are much slower than their Keriag brethren. They fight using the large claws on their hands. The Koth Taraan breed very slowly, but live long. Because of this, they are said to have been almost defeated by the fast-breeding Keriags in an ancient war, and were forced to flee. They are led by the Koth Macquai - the oldest of the Koth Taraan. The Macquai has a glowing shard in his center, consisting of all the memories of the previous Koth Macquais. Also, because the Koth Taraan share a kind of mental communion, a form of mass telepathy, their memory is eternal, as each generation knows everything that the previous generation knew, going back to the very beginning. They communicate with humans through a similar telepathy, speaking directly into their minds. Younger Koth Taraan lack the subtle control of this power that their elders possess, and cannot help expressing their emotions as flashes of color that people see in their minds.

=== The Keriags ===
The Keriags are another ancient race, which shares a common ancestor with the Koth Taraan. They are spider-like, much like a centaur with spider's legs, except that their whole body is chitinous and resembles an insect's exoskeleton in texture. They fight using deadly jagged spears called gaer bolga, which have serrations designed to cause maximum damage affixed to the blade. They are held under the command of Princess Aurin, due to the heartstone around her neck - a fragment of a larger stone, whose siblings are attached to the Keriag Queens. If she should take it off for more than a Kirin Taq cycle (approximately one Dominions day), all the Keriags would die. However, the Keriags would know the minute she took it off, would swarm, and attack her palace, in an attempt to put it back on her. At the very least, they would take her down with them. However, Macaan has added a failsafe in case Aurin should ever attempt to use the Keriags against her father. The Keriags' stones are also connected to the trigger stone in Macaan's forehead - and so he could kill them all with a single thought.
