= Chris Wooding =

British writer (born 1977)

Chris Wooding (born 28 February 1977) is a British writer born in Leicester, and now living in London. His first book, Crashing, which he wrote at the age of nineteen, was published in 1998 when he was twenty-one. Since then he has written many more, including The Haunting of Alaizabel Cray, which was silver runner-up for the Nestlé Smarties Book Prize, and Poison, which won the Lancashire Children's Book of the Year. He is also the author of three different, completed series; Broken Sky, an anime-influenced fantasy serial for children, Braided Path, a fantasy trilogy for adults, and Malice, a young adult fantasy that mixes graphic novel with the traditional novel; as well as another, four-part series, Tales of the Ketty Jay, a steampunk sci-fi fantasy for adults.

== Works ==
=== Braided Path ===
1. The Weavers of Saramyr (2003)
2. The Skein of Lament (2004)
3. The Ascendancy Veil (2005)

=== Malice ===
1. Malice (2009)
2. Havoc (2010)

=== Tales of the Ketty Jay ===
1. Retribution Falls (2009)
2. The Black Lung Captain (2010)
3. The Iron Jackal (2011)
4. The Ace of Skulls (2013)

=== The Darkwater Legacy ===
1. The Ember Blade (2019)
2. The Shadow Casket (2023)

=== Standalone novels ===
- Crashing (1998)
- Catchman (1998)
- Kerosene (1999)
- Broken Sky series (1999–2001)
- Endgame (2000)
- The Haunting of Alaizabel Cray (2001)
- Poison (2003)
- Storm Thief (2006)
- The Fade (2007)
- Pandemonium (2012)
- Silver (2013)
- Velocity (2015)

== Awards and nominations ==
- 2001: The Haunting of Alaizabel Cray won the Nestlé Smarties Book Prize Silver Award (runner-up), category 9–11 years
- 2004: Poison won the Lancashire Children's Book of the Year
- 2004: Poison nominated for the Carnegie Medal
- 2007: Storm Thief nominated for the Carnegie Medal
- 2010: Retribution Falls shortlisted for the Arthur C. Clarke Award
