= The Girl from the Well =

Series of young adult novels by Rin Chupeco

- First edition hardcover
- The Girl from the Well; The Suffering
- Author: Rin Chupeco
- Country: United States
- Language: English
- Genre: Horror/suspense, young adult
- Publisher: Sourcebooks Fire
- Published: 2014 - 2015
- Media type: Print, e-book
- No. of books: 2

The Girl from the Well is a young adult series of novels by Rin Chupeco. The first book, The Girl from the Well, was published through Sourcebooks Fire on August 5, 2014, and was followed by The Suffering, which released on September 8, 2015.

== Synopsis ==
=== The Girl from the Well ===
Okiku is a restless spirit that has been wandering the earth. As her own life was stolen from her by a murderer, Okiku devotes her afterlife to finding and killing anyone that has taken the life of a child, as well as helping other ghosts find the eternal rest that she has continually been denied. It's an unhappy existence and one that seems like it will be forever unchanging until she meets Tark, a teenage boy whose body contains evil that's only barely contained by tattoos that cover his body.

=== The Suffering ===
After the events of the last book, Tark has now become Okiku's partner. She managed to help eradicate the entity that had been plaguing him, but when a friend of Tark's disappears in Japan's famous suicide forest, Tark must go to Japan with his cousin Callie to find her. When creatures of the earth start stirring, Okiku is weakened and cannot help Tark, as earth weakens water, and Okiku is a spirit of water. But Tark must try; it is after all, an eye for an eye. A foot for a foot. A life for a life.

== Reception ==
Critical reception for the series has been mostly positive. Common Sense Media gave The Girl from the Well a favorable review, writing that "There's more heart and a message here than the usual fare, and it's a mesmerizing read." The Boston Globe gave the first entry a predominantly favorable review as a "gruesome page-turner". The School Library Journal reviewed the second book in the series, favorably comparing it to the video game Corpse Party and the novel Another.

== Related folklore ==
This novel draws heavily on the Japanese folklore Banchō Sarayashiki, or The Dish Mansion at Banchō. Another name for this tale is Okiku and the Nine Plates. There are a few different versions of this tale, but all include a lover scorned, a missing plate, and Okiku being thrown down a well. "It first appeared under the title Bancho Sarayashiki in July 1741 at the Toyotakeza theater. The familiar ghost legend had been adapted into a ningyō jōruri production by Asada Iccho and Tamenaga Tarobei I. Like many successful puppet shows, a Kabuki version followed and in September 1824, Banchō Sarayashiki was staged at the Naka no Shibai theater starring Otani Tomoemon II and Arashi Koroku IV in the roles of Aoyama Daihachi and Okiku." Rin Chupeco has also wrote The Suffering, The Bone Witch, The Heartforger and The Shadowglass.
