= David Massey (author) =

British novelist

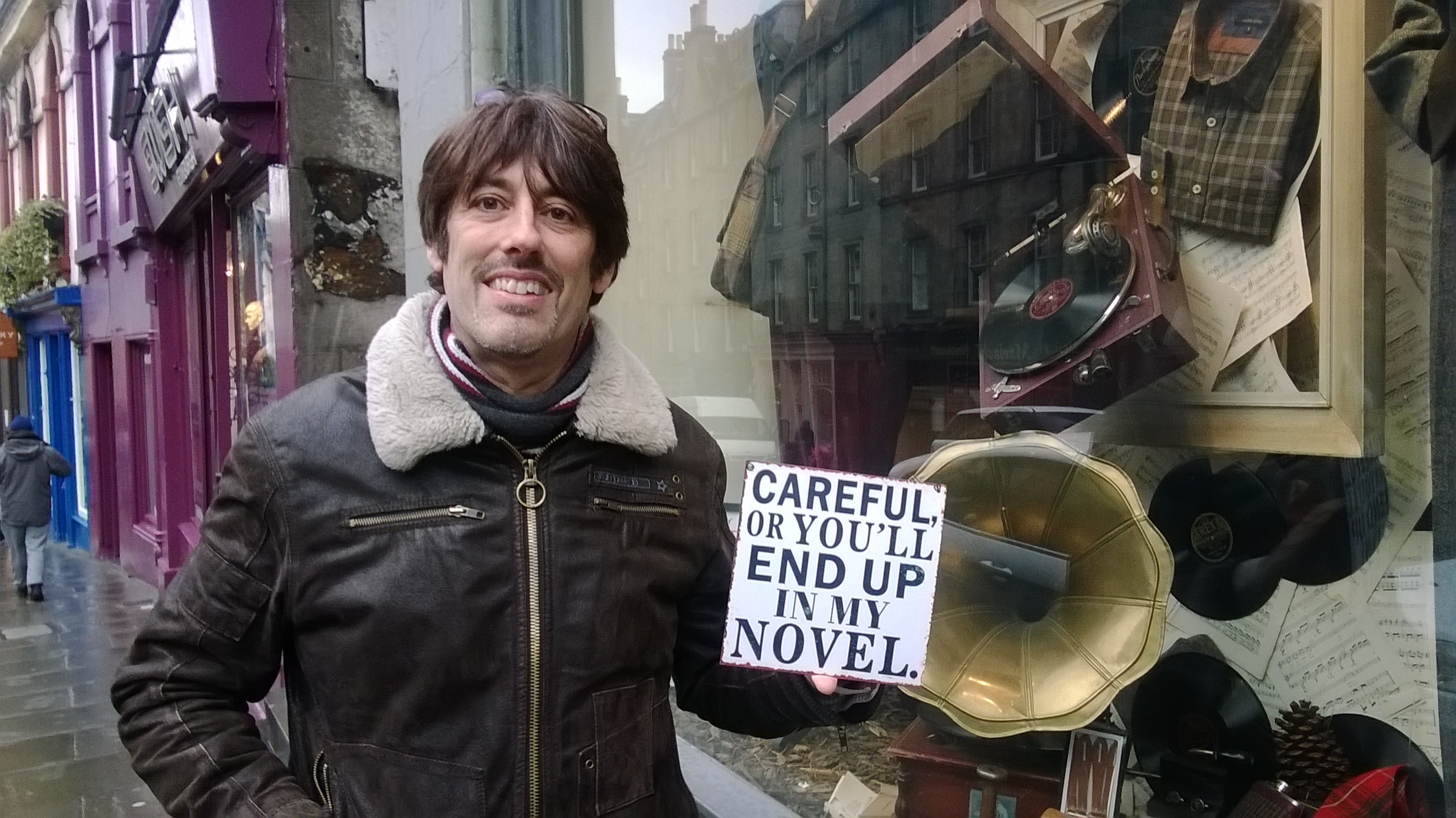
The author David Massey in Edinburgh for the RED book awards 2013

David Massey is a British, award-winning novelist. Massey is published in the UK and Europe by The Chicken House and in the United States by Chicken House USA, an imprint of Scholastic Corporation.

== Career ==
Massey began his writing career in 1989 as a reviewer for Brum Beat, and then for Focus newspapers in Birmingham. At the same time he began work as a presenter/producer for Network Eleven, a satellite sustaining service broadcasting from studios in Walsall. He went on to write and produce for a satellite sustaining service run by the charitable arm of IM Group in West Bromwich and then to install radio studios for them in the UK, Africa and Miami. In 2007 Massey and his wife set up an eco and emergency supplies business. The business was a semi finalist in the HSBC Startup Stars Awards 2009, and in 2012, won the Business in the Community award for excellence in the Climate Business Resilience category. Currently Massey works as Senior Technician (Film, TV and Radio) at Birmingham City University also known as BCU, in its Parkside studio complex.

His first break into writing came through UK publishing company, The Chicken House run by Barry Cunningham. The Chicken House published Massey's first novel, TORN in August 2012 which was Lancashire Book of the Year winner the following year. In its first full year of circulation, TORN was long-listed for the Branford Boase Award, and the Waterstone's Children's Book Prize. David's first novel has also been voted one of the most important books of 2014 in the United States by a group of twelve educators from the National Council for the Social Studies and has been nominated for the Georgia Peach awards 2014/15. World Book Day March 2013 saw the release of Massey's second YA or young adult fiction novel, TAKEN in the UK. On World Book Day 2018 Massey's third novel BONE SURFERS was released by Harvington Books.

== Personal life ==
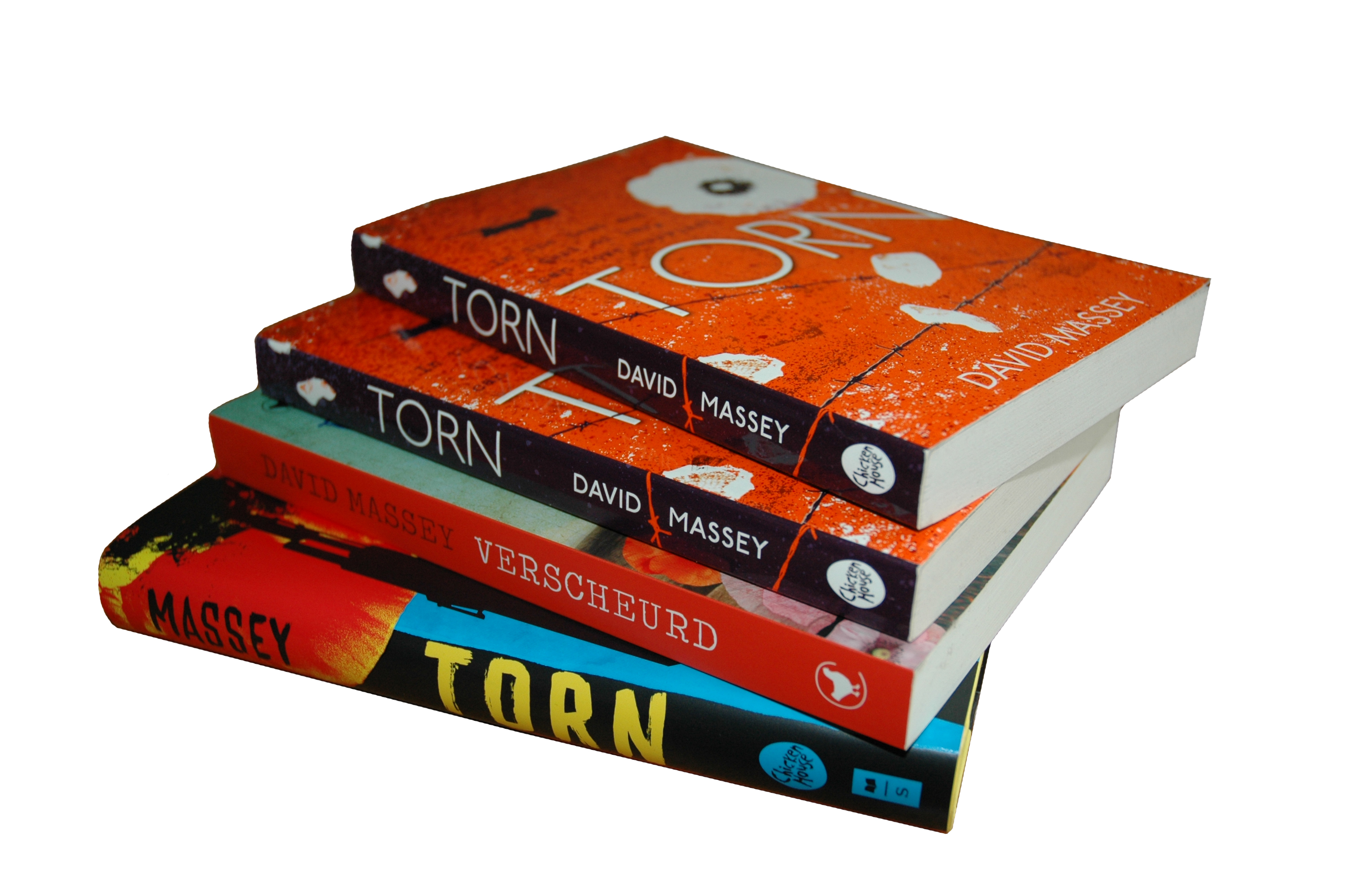
David's first YA novel - TORN

Massey was born in the West Midlands to Robert Massey and Beryl Massey. His early schooling was at Ryland Bedford, followed by an honors degree in combined arts at the University Of Central England (now known as Birmingham City University) where he also earned his QTS Qualified Teacher Status. In 1989 David led an aid expedition to Romania in the wake of the Romanian Revolution, visiting Timișoara and Bucharest where his team were tasked with locating and reporting on the state of local orphanages. On his return Massey and the team visited the Berlin Wall and witnessed the destruction first hand.

Massey married his wife Debi in 2002, whose twenty year radio career includes three years presenting as the Hunter on BBC Radio WM's Hunted. They moved to the Stourbridge area in November of the same year, where they continue to reside.
