= Kendare Blake =

American author of young adult novels

- Born: Seoul, South Korea
- Education: Ithaca College; Middlesex University (MFA)
- Occupation: Novelist
- Writing career
- Language: English
- Years active: 2011-now
- Genre: Young adult literature
- Notable work: Three Dark Crowns
- Website: kendareblake.com

Kendare Blake is a contemporary author of young adult novels. Her works include Anna Dressed in Blood, Antigoddess (2013) and Three Dark Crowns.

== Early life ==
Originally from Seoul, South Korea, Kendare Blake was raised in Cambridge, Minnesota by adoptive parents.

She is an alumna of both Ithaca College (in New York) and Middlesex University in London. It was at the latter where she received her Master of Arts Degree in Creative Writing.

== Career ==
Her books stretch over a variety of genres, including horror, fantasy and contemporary fiction. Several of her works have been listed on the New York Times Best Sellers List.

Her Anna Dressed in Blood duology and Goddess War trilogy were originally published in English by Tor Teen, while the Three Dark Crowns series was published by HarperTeen.

In November 2019 Blake announced via an Instagram post that HarperTeen would also be publishing her next three books. This was confirmed by a small piece in Publishers Weekly online on November 11. A stand-alone horror novel titled All These Bodies was released in 2021.

In April 2021, Publishers Weekly announced Disney-Hyperion had obtained the rights to a new trilogy series by Blake, to be entitled In Every Generation. This series will be set in the same universe as the TV show Buffy the Vampire Slayer.

== Primary works ==
=== The Anna Duology ===
The Anna Duology is a two book series comprising the books Anna Dressed in Blood and Girl of Nightmares. The books follow Cas Lowood, a teenage ghost hunter whose father was killed by ghosts. Cas and his mother travel the world searching for spirits needing to be sent to the afterlife, and his latest assignment is Anna Dressed in Blood, a ghost with a reputation for ripping apart young men who venture into her home. Despite his life-long commitment to destroying spirits like Anna, Cas feels compelled to learn more about the real girl behind the spirit, and while working to solve her murder develops feelings for the ghost. In the first book, Anna eventually sacrifices herself to save Cas' life, while the second book focuses on Cas' journey to get her back and allow her to find a peaceful afterlife.

=== The Goddess War Series ===
Goddess War is a series comprising three main books and two novellas. The first book, Antigoddess, focuses on the Greek goddess Athena and several other ancient immortals, all of whom are slowly dying in a variety of ways. A few of the old Gods have gone mad in their death throes and are hunting other former immortals in order to absorb some of their life force and prolong their existence. Looking for help, Athena and Hermes seek out a mortal girl named Cassandra who was once a powerful oracle, hoping to unlock her past memories that could help them. Book 2, Mortal Gods, Athena and Cassandra have formed an alliance and hope to battle Ares and his army of other dying Gods, which includes Aphrodite who killed the love of Cassandra's life. The two also seek out Achilles who they believe may be the key to winning the war. They are beaten back, however, and in the final book, Ungodly, Athena is stuck in the underworld while her allies try to find a way to heal the three Fates, who they discover are the source of the God's illnesses.

The two novellas in the series are both prequels with The Dogs of Athens focusing on Artemis as she searches for other immortals along with her pack of hungry dogs and When Gods and Vampires Roamed Miami focusing on a young man who mistakenly believes Athena to be a vampire and his attempts to get her to "turn" him.

=== Buffy: The Next Generation ===
The planned trilogy is a sequel series to the Joss Whedon television show Buffy the Vampire Slayer. Book 1 in the series, In Every Generation, focuses on Frankie Rosenberg, daughter of Willow Rosenberg who is both a witch and a vampire slayer. Book 2, One Girl in All the World, introduces a new "big bad" known as "The Darkness." The trilogy concludes with Against the Darkness.

== Bibliography ==
=== The Anna Duology ===
1. Anna Dressed In Blood (2011; Tor Teen) – ISBN 9780765328656
2. Girl of Nightmares (2012; Tor Teen) – ISBN 9780765328663

Ominibus:

- The Anna Dressed in Blood Duology (2018) – ISBN 9781250301024

=== Goddess War Trilogy ===
1. Antigoddess (2013; Tor) – ISBN 9780765334435
2. Mortal Gods (2014; Tor) – ISBN 9780765334442
3. Ungodly (2015; Tor) – ISBN 9780765334459

Prequel novellas:

- 0.1. The Dogs of Athens (Prequel novella) (2015; Tor) – ISBN 9780765384539
- 0.5. When Gods and Vampires Roamed Miami (Prequel novella) (2014; Tor) – ISBN 9781466882478

Ominibus:

- The Goddess War Trilogy (2018; Tor Teen) – ISBN 9781250293466

=== Three Dark Crowns Series ===
1. Three Dark Crowns (2016; Quill Tree Books) – ISBN 9780062385437
2. One Dark Throne (2017; Quill Tree Books) – ISBN 9780062385468
3. Two Dark Reigns (2018; Quill Tree Books) – ISBN 9780062686145
4. Five Dark Fates (2019; Quill Tree Books) – ISBN 9780062686176

Prequel novellas:

- 0.1. The Oracle Queen (Prequel novella) (2018; Quill Tree Books) – ISBN 9780062748270 (ebook)
- 0.2. The Young Queens (Prequel novella) (2017; Quill Tree Books) – ISBN 9780062748263 (ebook)

Collection:

- Queens of Fennbirn (Combining The Young Queens and The Oracle Queen) (2018; HarperTeen) – ISBN 9780062748287

Ominibus:

- Three Dark Crowns Series (2020) – ISBN 9789123969289

=== In Every Generation Trilogy (Buffy the Vampire Slayer) ===
1. In Every Generation (2022; Disney-Hyperion) – ISBN 9781368075022
2. One Girl in All the World (January 2023) – ISBN 9781368075077
3. Against the Darkness (April, 2024) - ISBN 9781368075084

=== Heromakers ===
1. Champion of Fate (2023) - ISBN 978-0062977229
2. Warrior of Legend (2024) - ISBN 978-0062977250

=== Standalone novels ===
- Sleepwalk Society (2010; PRA Publishing) – ISBN 9780982140710
- All These Bodies (2021; Quill Tree Books) – ISBN 9780062977168

=== Short fiction ===
==== Contributions to anthologies ====
Year	Contribution	Anthology	Editor	ISBN
2015	"On the I-5"	Slasher Girls & Monster Boys (2015)	ed. April Genevieve Tucholke	ISBN 9780803741737
2015	"Burning Effigies"	Violent Ends (2015)		ISBN 9781481437455
2016	"Heart"	The Truth Is out There (2016)	ed. Jonathan Maberry	ISBN 9781631405266
2019	"She Rode a Horse of Fire"	His Hideous Heart (2019)	ed. Dahlia Adler	ISBN 9781250302779

==== Contributions to magazines ====
Year	Contribution	Magazine	Editor	ISBN
2009	"The Oak Prison"	Expanded Horizons, Issue 13	ed. Dash	
2010	"Twilight, Choking on Owl Feathers"	Mirror Dance, Summer 2010	ed. Megan Arkenberg	

== Other media ==
In 2016, Twilight author Stephenie Meyer purchased the rights to turn Anna Dressed in Blood into a feature film through her production company Fickle Fish Films. In May of that same year, it was announced that Maddie Hasson and Cameron Monaghan had been cast in the roles of Anna and Cass Lowood, respectively. At that time, Trish Sie was named as the director, though later she was replaced by Amanda Row.

In February 2017, Variety announced the Fox Corporation had plans to turn the Three Dark Crowns series into a feature film through the 21 Laps Entertainment production company, which has also produced the Netflix series Stranger Things and the film Arrival. Shawn Levy and Dan Levine were announced as producers.

In April 2019 it was also announced that Blake's short story "On the I-5", which was featured in the Slasher Girls & Monster Boys anthology. had been optioned for adaptation by Warner Bros. As with Three Dark Crowns, production is being handled by 21 Laps Entertainment, and Shawn Levy and Dan Levine will also produce. The story has been called "a female-empowered subversion of the serial-killer genre."

== Awards and honors ==
=== Anna Dressed In Blood ===
- Cybils Award Nominee (2011)
- Kirkus "Best Teen Books of the Year" (2011)
- Top 5 Novels of the Year - NPR (2011)
- Missouri Gateway Readers Award Nominee (2014)
- Lincoln Award Nominee (2015)

=== Three Dark Crowns ===
- Missouri Gateway Reader's Award Nominee (2018)
- Lincoln Award Nominee (2019)

=== All These Bodies ===
- YALSA Teens Top Ten award winner. (2022)

=== Champion of Fate ===
- Kirkus "Best Teen Books of the Year" 2023
