= Rin Chupeco =

Chinese Filipino writer of young adult fiction

- Born: Manila, Philippines
- Occupation: Novelist
- Children: 2
- Writing career
- Language: English
- Years active: 2012–present
- Genre: Young adult fiction
- Notable works: The Bone Witch, The Girl from the Well
- Website: rinchupeco.com

Rin Chupeco is a Chinese Filipino writer of young adult fiction, best known for their books The Bone Witch, The Girl from the Well, and The Never-Tilting World series.

== Personal life ==
Chupeco was born and raised in Manila, Philippines. They are of Chinese, Malay, Thai, and Filipino descent.

As a child, Chupeco was fascinated with ghost stories, saying that they were drawn in by the injustice of Japanese tales that tend to favor male aggressors and never end positively for women. They collected the works of Peter Straub, Stephen King, Shirley Jackson, Edgar Allan Poe, and Christopher Pike. Their favorite story is that of the kuchisake-onna.

They describe themselves as a pansexual, liberal atheist. Chupeco is non-binary and uses they/them pronouns.

Prior to becoming an author, Chupeco worked as a graphic designer.

Chupeco is married and lives with their partner and two children in Manila.

== Selected works ==
Chupeco's works often draw inspiration from Asian cultures.

The Girl from the Well Series

Their debut novel The Girl from The Well tells the story of Okiku, a vengeful spirit who hunts for abusers and eats their souls, who finds herself in a battle with another evil spirit when she falls for Tark, the boy that the spirit is tethered to. It was published by Sourcebooks Fire in August 2014 and received a starred review from Publishers Weekly. Chupeco says that it was inspired by Japanese horror, particularly the Japanese legend of the Bancho Sarayashiki and the Ju-on: The Grudge movies, which they rewatched multiple times prior to writing the book. With the novel, Chupeco aimed to try a spin on the topic that had not been done before by making the ghost character the sympathetic anti-heroine.

A companion novel, The Suffering, continues the story of Okiku and Tark as they travel the country.

The Bone Witch Series

The first novel in the series, The Bone Witch, follows Tea, a teen with the ability to raise the dead, who finds herself caught in a struggle for power as she explores her newfound abilities after she accidentally resurrects her late brother.

Chupeco says that their writing often is very experimental, mixing different styles and themes, which led to them writing The Bone Witch in order to tell the story of characters in two different time periods. The Bone Witch series was inspired by Filipino witch doctors, mangkukulam. They also drew on Middle Eastern folklore and influences, like the Ayyubid dynasty and Wahhabism. The witch aspect was inspired by real-life geisha. The Bone Witch was published by Sourcebooks Fire in February 2017 and received starred reviews from Shelf Awareness and Publishers Weekly.

The sequel, The Heart Forger, was published in February 2019. It received starred reviews from Booklist and Foreword Reviews. The last novel in the series, The Shadowglass, was published in March 2019.

Silver Under Nightfall Series

On August 4, 2021, Chupeco announced a two-book book deal for their latest series, Silver Under Nightfall, with Saga Press / Simon & Schuster on Twitter. This marks their adult sci-fi and fantasy debut, and is about a bounty hunter who must work with a royal vampire couple to fight off a new vampire breed from overcoming both their kingdoms.

== Bibliography ==
Series

The Girl from the Well

1. The Girl from the Well (Sourcebooks Fire, 2014)
2. The Suffering (Sourcebooks Fire, 2015)

The Bone Witch

1. The Bone Witch (Sourcebooks Fire, 2017)
2. The Heart Forger (Sourcebooks Fire, 2018)
3. The Shadowglass (Sourcebooks Fire, 2019)

The Never Tilting World

1. The Never Tilting World (HarperTeen, 2019)
2. The Ever Cruel Kingdom (HarperTeen, 2020)

A Hundred Names for Magic

1. Wicked as You Wish (Sourcebooks Fire, 2020)
2. An Unreliable Magic (Sourcebooks Fire, 2022)

Silver Under Nightfall

1. Silver Under Nightfall (Saga Press, 2022)
2. Court of Wanderers (Saga Press, 2024)

Standalones

- The Sacrifice (Sourcebooks, 2022)
- Are You Afraid of the Dark?: The Tale of the Gravemother (Amulet Books, 2023)
- We're Not Safe Here (Sourcefire Books, 2025)

Short stories

- Juan Perez's Corpse in Expeditions Prose: The Philippine Graphic Fiction Awards Vol. 1 and Neil Gaiman Presents: The Philippine Graphic Fiction Awards - Prose Anthology
- Ho-We in Lauriat: A Filipino-Chinese Speculative Fiction Anthology (Lethe Press, 2012)
- Sugar and Spite in Hungry Hearts: 13 Tales of Food & Love (Simon Pulse, 2019)
- The Murders in the Rue Apartelle, Boracay in His Hideous Heart (Flatiron, 2019)
- Kapre: A Love Story in Black Cranes: Stories of Unquiet Women (Omnium Gatherum, 2020)
- Worthy in an undisclosed anthology (TBA)
