= List of fictional portrayals of eating disorders =

The following is a list of fictional media portraying eating disorders as a prominent or main theme (excluding brief trivial and non-notable mentions). List is categorized by media type and title in alphabetical order. This list is non-exhaustive and may not include all fictional works on the subject matter, including self-published content, international media, recently released media and non-notable content.

== Films ==
- Abzurdah (2015 Argentine film)
- Feed (2017 American film)
- For the Love of Nancy (1994 American film)
- Heathers (1988 American film)
- Heavy (1995 American film)
- Kate's Secret (1986 American film)
- My Skinny Sister (2015 Swedish film)
- Perfect Body (1997 American film)
- Sharing the Secret (2000 American film)
- Spencer (2021 British-American film)
- Starving in Suburbia (2014 American film)
- The Best Little Girl in the World (1981 American TV movie)
- The Neon Demon (2016 American film)
- Thinner (1996 American film)
- To the Bone (2017 American film)
- Vincent Wants to Sea (2010 German film)
- When Friendship Kills (1996 American film)

== Television ==
- Calendar Girl (DC Comics): character created by Paul Dini for The New Batman Adventures
- Slim Obsession (1984 Canadian TV short)
- Heartstopper: (Seasons 2 & 3) Charlie Spring and anorexia nervosa

== Books ==
- Fat Chance (1994 novel by Lesléa Newman)
- Girls Under Pressure (1998 novel by Dame Jacqueline Wilson)
- How I Live Now (2004 novel by Meg Rosoff)
- Hunger for Life (2019 novel by Andy Marr)
- Killing Aurora (1999 novel by Helen Barnes)
- Kim: Empty Inside: The Diary of an Anonymous Teenager (2002 novel by Beatrice Sparks)
- Letting Ana Go (2013 novel by Anonymous)
- Life in the Fat Lane (1998 novel by Cherie Bennett)
- Life-Size (1992 novel by Jenefer Shute)
- Perfect (2002 novel by Natasha Friend)
- Skinny (2004 novel by Ibi Kaslik)
- The Art of Starving (2017 novel by Sam J. Miller)
- The Cat Ate My Gymsuit (1974 novel by Paula Danziger)
- The Best Little Girl in the World (1979 novel by Steven Levenkron)
- Thinner (1984 novel by Stephen King as "Richard Bachman")
- Wintergirls (2009 novel by Laurie Halse Anderson)
- Worthy of Love (2019 novel by Andre Fenton)
