= Jeff Gottesfeld =

American novelist (born 1956)

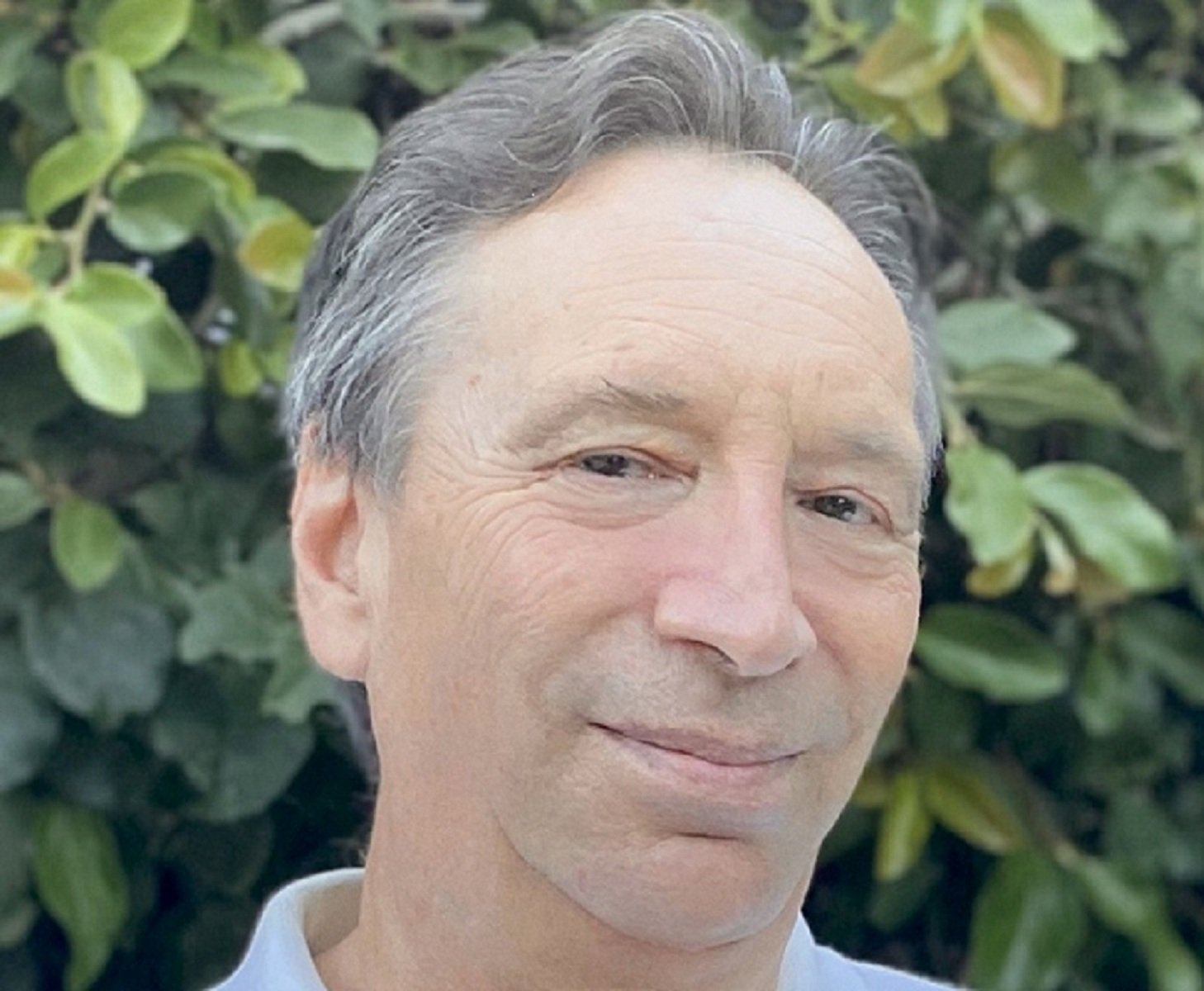
- Jeff Gottesfeld in 2023
- Born: Howard Jeffrey Gottesfeld; 1956 (age 69–70)
- Education: Colby College (BA); University of San Francisco (JD)
- Occupations: Novelist; playwright; writer
- Notable work: Twenty-One Steps: Guarding the Tomb of the Unknown Soldier (illustrated by Matt Tavares); The Tree in the Courtyard: Looking Through Anne Frank's Window (illustrated by Peter McCarty); Food for Hope: How John van Hengel Invented Food Banks for the Hungry (illustrated by Michelle Laurentia Agatha); The Christmas Mitzvah (illustrated by Michelle Laurentia Agatha); The World’s Strongest Librarian (play adaptation of the book by Josh Hanegarn)

Howard Jeffrey Gottesfeld (born 1956) is an American novelist, playwright, and screen and television writer.

Gottesfeld is an author of children's literature. Together with ex-wife Cherie Bennett, he has written under the pen name Zoey Dean, including How to Teach Filthy Rich Girls which was developed into the series Privileged. Gottesfeld has also written freelance for numerous magazines and newspapers and continues to publish essays on subjects such as the effect of the Gaza conflict on American-Jewish family relations, Confederate flag, immigration policy, and trends in young adult fiction. For television, he has written for such shows as Smallville and The Young and the Restless.

Gottesfeld has won a Sydney Taylor Book Award for The Tree in the Courtyard: Looking Through Anne Frank's Window, while his No Steps Behind: Beate Sirota Gordon's Battle for Women's Rights in Japan was named the Freeman Book Award’s best picture book. Food for Hope: How John van Hengel Invented Food Banks for the Hungry won the Christopher Award. In addition, his play World’s Strongest Librarian won the American Alliance for Theatre and Education’s Distinguished Play Award.

== Early life ==
Gottesfeld grew up in Teaneck, New Jersey, attended Teaneck High School, Colby College, and then the University of San Francisco School of Law.

== Career ==
Gottesfeld has written freelance for numerous magazines and newspapers, and continues to publish essays on such subjects as trends in young adult fiction, the effect of the Gaza conflict on American Jewish family relations, Confederate flag, immigration policy, and trends in young adult fiction

His fiction ranges from elementary age children to adult. For television, he has written for such shows as Smallville and The Young and the Restless. Together with Cherie Bennett, he has written under the pen name Zoey Dean. Under the Zoey Dean pen name, Gottesfeld and Bennett wrote The A-List series of books (developed by the same publishing group as Gossip Girl), and How to Teach Filthy Rich Girls, which was developed into the series Privileged. His credits also include novelizations for Dawson’s Creek, Smallville and for the WWE.

His first picture book was The Tree in the Courtyard: Looking Through Anne Frank's Window, published by Random House/Knopf in March, 2016. It received starred reviews in Booklist and School Library Journal. His 2020 children's book, No Steps Behind: Beate Sirota Gordon's Battle for Women's Rights in Japan, documents the life and activism of Beate Sirota Gordon. It is the winner of the 2020 NCTA Freeman Award, for the best children's book about Asia. It was also a runner-up finalist for the 2020 National Jewish Book Award. His March, 2021 picture book, with illustrations by Matt Tavares, is Twenty-One Steps: Guarding the Tomb of the Unknown Soldier, published by Candlewick Press. It received a number of starred reviews, as well as praise from the Wall Street Journal. It is about the origins of the Tomb of the Unknown Soldier and its Tomb Guards. Food for Hope: How John van Hengel Invented Food Banks for the Hungry, illustrated by Michelle Laurentia Agatha and printed in 2023, was a spring showcase selection for the Children’s Book Council, winner of the Goddard Riverside Children’s Book Council Youth Prize for Social Justice award, the Christophers Award and recipient of the bronze medal of the Independent Publishers Association (IPPY) for Children’s Picture Book (All Ages).

Gottesfeld, who did not serve in the armed forces, remarked that he saw himself as an "imperfect messenger" with regards to writing about the United States military, which he called "the greatest fighting force for good the world has ever known". Gottesfeld’s Honor Flight will be released in 2026, an illustrated book about the Honor Flight organization, illustrated by Matt Tavares. In addition, We All Serve, an illustrated book about how the children of service families, known as military brats, all serve in their own way, illustrated by TeMika Grooms, will be released the same year. He has spoken to various groups about his work, including a nationally broadcast program into schools for the National Archive in 2021.

== Awards and nominations ==
Award	Year	Category	Recipient(s)	Result	Ref.
The New York Times	2016	Best Illustrated Children’s Books	The Tree in the Courtyard: Looking Through Anne Frank's Window	Selected	
Chicago Public Library	2016	Best Children’s Book List	The Tree in the Courtyard: Looking Through Anne Frank's Window	Selected	
Association of Jewish Libraries	2017	Sydney Taylor Book Award, Notable Title	The Tree in the Courtyard: Looking Through Anne Frank's Window	Won	
Booklist	2017	Lasting Connections (list of top 30 books of the year grades K-12)	The Tree in the Courtyard: Looking Through Anne Frank's Window	Selected	
Notable Books for a Global Society	2017	Notable Books for a Global Society	The Tree in the Courtyard: Looking Through Anne Frank's Window	Selected	
National Council for the Social Studies & Children’s Book Council	2017	Notable Social Studies Trade Books	The Tree in the Courtyard: Looking Through Anne Frank's Window	Selected	
Children’s Book Council	2017	One World Many Stories	The Tree in the Courtyard: Looking Through Anne Frank's Window	Selected	
American Alliance for Theatre and Education	2017	Distinguished Play Award	World’s Strongest Librarian	Won	
Children’s Book Council	2020	Champions of Change Booklist	No Steps Behind: Beate Sirota Gordon's Battle for Women's Rights in Japan	Selected	
National Jewish Book Award	2020	Picture Book	No Steps Behind: Beate Sirota Gordon's Battle for Women's Rights in Japan	Runner-up	
Freeman Book Award	2021	Picture Book	No Steps Behind: Beate Sirota Gordon's Battle for Women's Rights in Japan	Runner-up	
United Through Reading	2021	Audrey Geisel Friend of Military Children Award	Twenty-One Steps: Guarding the Tomb of the Unknown Soldier	Won	
Tablet	2021	Outstanding Jewish Children’s Book List	The Christmas Mitzvah	Selected	
School Library Journal	2021	Outstanding Non-Fiction Children’s Book List	Twenty-One Steps: Guarding the Tomb of the Unknown Soldier	Selected	
Kirkus	2021	Best Picture Books of the Year	Twenty-One Steps: Guarding the Tomb of the Unknown Soldier	Won	
Wall Street Journal	2021	Best Books for Children	Twenty-One Steps: Guarding the Tomb of the Unknown Soldier	Selected	
North Carolina Children’s Book Award	2022	Junior Books	Twenty-One Steps: Guarding the Tomb of the Unknown Soldier	Nominated	
Texas Topaz	2022	Non-Fiction Reading List, Unanimous Recommendations, Grades 3-5	Twenty-One Steps: Guarding the Tomb of the Unknown Soldier	Selected	
Association of Jewish Libraries	2022	Sydney Taylor Book Award, Honor Book	The Christmas Mitzvah	Silver Medal	
American Library Association	2022	Notable Children’s Books List	Twenty-One Steps: Guarding the Tomb of the Unknown Soldier	Selected	
Indiana Library Federation	2023-24	Young Hoosier Book Award	Twenty-One Steps: Guarding the Tomb of the Unknown Soldier	Nominated	
Children’s Book Council	2023	Spring Showcase Selection	Food for Hope: How John van Hengel Invented Food Banks for the Hungry	Selected	
Arkansas State Library	2023-24	Charlie May Simon Book Awards	Twenty-One Steps: Guarding the Tomb of the Unknown Soldier	Nominated	
Goddard Riverside Children’s Book Council Youth Prize	2023	Goddard Riverside CBC Youth Book Prize for Social Justice	Food for Hope: How John van Hengel Invented Food Banks for the Hungry	Won	
Christophers Award	2024	Books for Young People	Food for Hope: How John van Hengel Invented Food Banks for the Hungry	Won	
California Reading Association	2025	EUREKA! Nonfiction Children's Book Awards	Fight for the Right to Read: Samuel Wilbert Tucker and the 1939 Sit-Down Strike for Library Reading Equality	Silver Medal	
Independent Publishers Association (IPPY)	2024	Children’s Picture Book (All Ages)	Food for Hope: How John van Hengel Invented Food Banks for the Hungry	Bronze Medal	

== Television credits ==
- Broken Bridges (2006)

The Young and the Restless (hired by Lynn Marie Latham)

- Script Writer: December 14, 2006 - December 21, 2007; March 18 - August 19, 2008
- Associate Head Writer: July 2007 - December 21, 2007; March 18 - July 10, 2008

As the World Turns

- Breakdown Writer: 2005

Port Charles

- Story Consultant: 1998

Another World

- Story Consultant: 1997

Girls Got Game: 2006

Smallville: 2001 - 2002

== Films ==
- Broken Bridges (Writer: 2006)

== Selected bibliography ==
Books

Key
†	Denotes works that have not yet been released

Year	Title	Publisher	ISBN	Notes
2002	Anne Frank And Me	Putnam Juvenile	978-0-399-23329-6	With Cherie Bennett.
2003	The A-List	Megan Tingley Publishers	978-0-316-73435-6	Written under the pseudonym Zoey Dean. First novel of The A-List series.
2004	A Heart Divided	Laurel Leaf	978-0-440-22840-0	With Cherie Bennett.
2004	Girls on Film: An A-List Novel	Poppy	978-0-316-73475-2	Written under the pseudonym Zoey Dean. Second novel of The A-List series.
2004	Blonde Ambition: An A-List Novel	Poppy	978-0-316-73474-5	Written under the pseudonym Zoey Dean. Third novel of The A-List series.
2005	Tall Cool One: An A-List Novel	Little, Brown & Company	978-0-316-04157-7	Written under the pseudonym Zoey Dean. Fourth novel of The A-List series.
2005	Back in Black: An A-List Novel	Little, Brown & Company	0-316-01092-8	Written under the pseudonym Zoey Dean. Fifth novel of The A-List series.
2006	Some Like it Hot: An A-List Novel	Poppy	978-0-31601093-1	Written under the pseudonym Zoey Dean. Sixth novel of The A-List series.
2006	American Beauty: An A-List Novel	Little, Brown & Company	978-0-316-01094-8	Written under the pseudonym Zoey Dean. Seventh novel of The A-List series.
2007	Turn Me On	Berkley	978-1-440-62349-3	Written under the pseudonym Cherie Jeffrey.
2007	How to Teach Filthy Rich Girls	Grand Central Publishing	978-0-446-69718-7	Written under the pseudonym Zoey Dean. Developed into the TV series Privileged.
2007	Heart of Glass: An A-List Novel	Little, Brown & Company	978-0-316-01096-2	Written under the pseudonym Zoey Dean. Eighth novel of The A-List series.
2007	Beautiful Stranger: An A-List Novel	Little, Brown & Company	978-0-316-11352-6	Written under the pseudonym Zoey Dean. Ninth novel of The A-List series.
2008	California Dreaming: An A-List Novel	Poppy	978-0-316-11353-3	Written under the pseudonym Zoey Dean. Tenth novel of The A-List series.
2016	The Tree in the Courtyard: Looking Through Anne Frank's Window	Knopf Books for Young Readers	978-0-385-75397-5	Illustrated by Peter McCarty.
2020	No Steps Behind: Beate Sirota Gordon's Battle for Women's Rights in Japan	Creston Books	978-1-939-54755-2	Illustrated by Shiella Witanto.
2021	Twenty-One Steps: Guarding the Tomb of the Unknown Soldier	Candlewick	978-1-939-54755-2	Illustrated by Matt Tavares.
2021	The Christmas Mitzvah	Creston Books	978-1-939-54794-1	Illustrated by Michelle Laurentia Agatha.
2023	Food for Hope: How John van Hengel Invented Food Banks for the Hungry	Creston Books	978-1-954-35424-1	Illustrated by Michelle Laurentia Agatha.
2025	Fight for the Right to Read: Samuel Wilbert Tucker and the 1939 Sit-Down Strike for Library Reading Equality	Creston Books	978-1-954-35433-3	Written with Michelle Y. Green, illustrated by Kim Holt.
2026	Honor Flight †	Candlewick	978-1-536-23015-4	Illustrated by Matt Tavares.
2026	We All Serve †	Candlewick		Illustrated by TeMika Grooms.

Plays

- Anne Frank and Me, written with Cherie Bennett (1997)
- A Heart Divided, written with Cherie Bennett (2004)
- 10 by 10: Ten Short Plays About Values, editor (2005)
- Does My Head Look Big in This? with Elizabeth Wong, adapted from the novel by Randa Abdel-Fattah (2014)
- The World's Strongest Librarian with Elizabeth Wong, adapted from the memoir by Josh Hanagarne (2016)
- The Greater-Than-Ever American Songbag with Elizabeth Wong (2025)
