= A-list (disambiguation) =

The A-list is a list of the most bankable movie stars in Hollywood.

A-list or alist may also refer to:

== Television ==
- The A-List (2007 TV series), a reality television series featuring countdowns of the wildest creatures of the animal kingdom
- The A List (2018 TV series), a teen thriller series on BBC
- The A List (Comedy Central TV series), a stand-up comedy program on Comedy Central
- The A-List (Toronto TV series), an entertainment magazine program on Toronto television station CKXT-DT
- The A-List: New York, an American reality television series by LGBT-interest network Logo
- The A-List: Dallas, a second Logo reality series in the A-List franchise
- The A-List, a teen television series from the young adult novel series by The CW Television Network

== Other uses ==
- A-List (Conservative), a list of priority candidates in the British Conservative Party
- The A-List (novel series), a young adult novel series by Zoey Dean
  - The A-List (novel), the first novel in this series
- The A List (album), the second album by British boy band A1
- The A List (radio program), an adult-contemporary chart show on Hit40UK radio
- Association list, in computer science
- A List, a 1923 play by Gertrude Stein
