= The Best Little Girl in the World (novel) =

1979 American young adult novel

- Hardcover edition
- Author: Steven Levenkron
- Language: English; French
- Genre: young adult coming-of-age
- Publisher: Warner Books
- Publication date: 1979
- Publication place: United States
- ISBN: 9780446358651 (print edition)
- OCLC: 29362812

The Best Little Girl in the World is a 1979 American young adult coming of age novel by Steven Levenkron, telling the story of Kessa, a teen who has an eating disorder. The book was originally published by Warner Books in 1979. It was adapted into a 1981 ABC TV film by the same name, and it won the American Library Association Best Book for Young Adults Award.

== Plot ==
Francesca Dietrich is a middle-class American teenager, aspiring ballerina, and a girl who has anorexia nervosa. She obsesses over a fantasy variant of herself, insisting on being called by the name "Kessa" and worrying over the demands of her controlling, strict ballet teacher. Fixated with weight loss and treated like a young child by her family, Kessa retreats further and further into her mental illness, leading her parents to finally recognize it months later, after which they send her to a male therapist. Kessa develops romantic feelings for the therapist, which would cross ethical boundaries if acted upon, and she also deals with the death of a friend in the hospital. As she gradually recovers, various ideas for what caused the eating disorder are explored at length: Kessa loathes her emerging womanhood and puberty as it affects her contours, including her breasts, waist and buttocks. She feels a strong sense of rivalry with her siblings and her neurotic mother and father. She also surrounds herself with controlling people, such as her parents and teacher, with her eating disorder being the one outlet where she gets to make the rules. Kessa begins eating small portions of food, hoping to be able to overcome her illness.

== Legacy ==
The Best Little Girl in the World was in part based on Levenkron's experiences with deceased musician Karen Carpenter, who later died in 1983 after a long struggle with an eating disorder. It received mixed reviews from critics, with Kirkus Reviews praising the book's portrayal of Kessa's therapist, but criticizing the protagonist's "less-than-convincing interior monologues" and the plot ending that "promises a bit too zippy a cure, and certainly doesn't furnish the eye-opening epiphany required for gripping psycho-drama."

In recent decades, the book has received stronger criticism from female reviewers who approached the book with applied feminism and critical race theory. One such example was a criticism from Erica Kanesaka, writing for Ms. Magazine, who stated, "In high school, I used to go to the public library after school and run my fingers along the spines of the small section of books they carried on adolescent trauma and mental health, books with titles like Reviving Ophelia and The Best Little Girl in the World. The girls on the covers were wispy blondes with watery blue eyes. The pages inside described them as pale and easily bruised, with adults in their lives who loved them and would do anything to save them. I learned from these books that female pain could best be understood through the language of whiteness." Anna Rollins of Electric Lit said of the book, "I devoured Steven Levenkron’s depiction of the stereotypical anorexic (white, cis, female, upper-class, and thin) cured by the (loosely autobiographical) white, male savior therapist in The Best Little Girl in the World... But it was Marya Hornbacher’s Wasted that resonated with me most fully. The book’s soft white cover centered a black-and-white figure of a sad-looking girl in nineties denim." Rollins argued that books about mental health where the female protagonist presents an "unflinching takedown of the patriarchal institutions" were more interesting, and that such books resonated with her into the debate over women's rights and abortion.

The book was adapted in 1981 into an ABC Afterschool Special titled The Best Little Girl in the World.
