= Hunger for Life =

2019 psychological drama novel by Andy Marr

- Both cover images
- Author: Andy Marr
- Language: English
- Genre: Coming-of-age, medical fiction
- Published: 2019
- Publisher: Kindle Direct Publishing
- Publication date: 2021
- Publication place: Scotland
- ISBN: 9781082844331 (paperback edition)
- Followed by: A Matter of Life and Death

Hunger for Life is a 2019 coming-of-age novel by Scottish author Andy Marr, which explores a man struggling between his anorexic sister, his aging parents, and his new free-spirited Austrian girlfriend, Hannah. Originally a self-published novel via Kindle Direct Publishing, the book received broader critical attention and popularity than expected, particularly for its accurate portrayal of eating disorders. The original book had an emerald-green cover with a photograph of two children on it; later versions had conceptual art sketches in black-and-white pencil.

== Plot ==
James has graduated from college and, rather than moving forward and securing long-term employment, he moves back into his childhood home with his parents; the family all struggle to help Emma, James's sister, who suffers from an eating disorder that is slowly consuming her life and her physical health. James feels powerless to help her, and unsure of where his future will go. He finds solace in Hannah, an eccentric free spirit and international student from Austria, but James's father begins retreating from life, concerning James about the possibility of something darker happening to his family. Emma is urged by doctors to gain weight, but she feels incessantly fat and refuses to do as they say. James finds himself torn between his family and his new adult life with Hannah, and has to decide where he stands as an individual.

== Reception ==
Hunger for Life was self-published, and initially received very little critical attention as a result. Later critics praised the previously undiscovered book, with Mischenko of ReadRantRock&Roll saying of it, "Hunger for life was an incredibly engaging read; the story was written well, descriptive and detailed, and the characters were all well-developed and complex. The writing style nearly prevented me from putting this book down. I was brought to tears at times. As far as the characters, I absolutely fell in love with James who narrates the entire story. It’s hard not to connect with him because everything pretty much revolves around him. He offers unwavering support to everyone, and he’s also forgiving which is such an amazing quality. He’s constantly attentive, concerned, reliable, and faithful to his family. Surprisingly, it was hard for me to connect with Hannah at all though; she turned out to be my least favorite character. Some of her decisions didn’t make sense to me and I just lost patience with her because she came across as selfish to me at times. This is of course my personal opinion though. The end was wrapped up beautifully and totally non-predictable."

Hunger for Life was praised by author Marya Hornbacher, famous for her own eating disorder memoir Wasted: A Memoir of Anorexia and Bulimia; Hornbacher called the book "a remarkable novel, with vibrant and deeply developed characters, taut and nuanced relationships, and simply lovely prose. Tightly paced and psychologically complex, Marr’s exquisite debut is a life-affirming and powerful read." Hornbacher went on to be the editor of Hunger for Life, credited on the back of the printed paperback of the book and in reviews by Marr himself.

== See also ==
- Wasted: A Memoir of Anorexia and Bulimia
