= Secret Cutting =

- Based on: The Luckiest Girl in the World by Steven Levenkron
- Teleplay by: Dennis Nemec
- Directed by: Norma Bailey
- Starring: Sean Young; Kimberlee Peterson; Robert Wisden; Rhea Perlman
- Music by: Bruce Hanifan
- Countries of origin: Canada; United States
- Original language: English

Production
- Cinematography: David Frazer
- Editor: Robert Lower
- Production companies: Longbow Productions; Lancaster Gate Productions

Original release
- Network: USA Network
- Release: May 30, 2000

Secret Cutting (also known as Painful Secrets) is a 2000 television film directed by Norma Bailey, starring Kimberlee Peterson and Rhea Perlman, about a self-harming teenager and her relation with family, friends and acquaintances. The story of the film is based on the novel The Luckiest Girl in the World, which was written by Steven Levenkron. The film aired on the USA Network.

== Plot ==
Dawn Cottrell (Kimberlee Peterson) is an artistically gifted teenager who is bullied by the popular clique in school and unable to assert any control over her life at home. Dawn's emotionally distant father, Russell (Robert Wisden), pressures her to do well in school in order to earn a scholarship, as he can't afford to send her to college. Her self-centered mother, Joyce (Sean Young), is dissatisfied both with her husband's passivity and lack of attention and the disrespect Dawn's younger brother shows her.

Dawn has no real friends at school, and her older boyfriend, Craig, a 19 year old musician, has no interest in her beyond how she can satisfy him physically. Using math problems as an excuse to get advice from her father about Craig's lack of communication, Russell is unable to handle any sort of emotional intimacy. Joyce, on the other hand, is incapable of discussing anything without making herself the focus.

Chosen to design the winter carnival theme, Dawn is mocked for her theme choices. The popular girls victimize and act maliciously towards her, pressuring her to create a "perfect" event. After a series of humiliations in front of an oblivious Joyce and unable to express extreme emotions outwardly, Dawn resorts to self-injury; the physical pain acts as a release from her emotional pain. Her actions are discovered by Lorraine, another social outsider in the high school with whom she can relate. A teacher observes blood on Dawn's blouse from her cut wrist, and the principal calls her parents to the school.

Humiliated after being told Dawn has other injuries and that this cannot happen again on school grounds without action being taken, Joyce once again refocuses the situation on herself by insisting Dawn's actions aren't a reflection of her parenting, while Russell's sole concern is whether the incident will be on Dawn's record when she applies to college. Joyce further humiliates Dawn by forcing her to unwrap her bandage in front of her father and brother, demanding that she explain what motivates her.

Lorraine introduces Dawn to her psychiatrist, Dr. Parella (Rhea Perlman), who tells Dawn she understands the feeling of control cutting gives her and that she can contact her any time. Declaring she can deal with Dawn's cutting better than any stranger, Joyce removes all the knives from the kitchen as a punishment for Dawn's lack of control and cuts up her supper for her, which encourages her brother's contemptuous treatment of her. These new strains leave Dawn even more unable to cope. When Craig breaks up with her after he discovers a series of fresh cuts on her legs, Dawn vents to Lorraine about her fear of Craig telling other people about her cutting. Lorraine coldly tells Dawn that Craig won't tell anyone because he won't want anyone to know he had anything to do with her and that her relationship with him was just a fantasy. After trying and failing to open up to Dr. Parella, in a burst of honesty, Dawn tells her father no one likes her and she has no friends, but Russell's response is to tell her she's being ridiculous and that she'll blossom in college. This leads Dawn to burn herself so seriously with the car cigarette lighter that her parents take her to the emergency room.

Realizing there is no alternative for Dawn, her parents agree to allow her to begin counselling with Dr. Parella, who addresses her inability to express emotional pain through verbal channels. Joyce, despairing that Dawn will cut too deep one day, shares with her that when she was a child, her younger sister was hit by a car while in her care. When Dawn is moved, Joyce ruins the moment by declaring that she will never again be blamed for a similar loss. When Dawn is mocked the next day in school for cutting herself, she discovers that Joyce has deliberately told a parent of one of Dawn's classmates about her cutting, in the mistaken notion that peer pressure will force her to stop. She then threatens to have Dawn institutionalized if she can't stop.

Triggered by the news that her friend Lorraine has been brutally beaten by her mother's boyfriend, and by Joyce's refusal to listen to her and take her to the hospital where she is in a coma, Dawn sneaks out to Craig's loft, where his bandmates have sex with her; the next morning she brutally slashes her body and ends up in the hospital in restraints. Joyce, tired of being blamed for her daughter's condition, decides it would be better for her to simply leave. Dawn, feeling abandoned by the only person she has left, finally confronts Joyce and tells her she always makes every situation about her own well-being, and yells at her to leave. When Dr. Parella comes to visit her in the hospital afterwards, Dawn breaks down into tears, admitting that her mother's departure didn't feel as bad as she thought it would. Dr. Parella points out that if Dawn is crying, she's not cutting.

After being released, Dawn goes to visit Lorraine, who is still in the hospital recovering. Dawn tells Lorraine about her mother leaving and shows her the photos of the winter carnival sets. Lorraine then tells Dawn that it's too good for the popular kids at their school, and they needed to enjoy their fleeting popularity while they can, but their own time is just beginning.
