= American Beauty (Dean novel) =

2006 novel by Zoey Dean

- Author: Zoey Dean
- Language: English
- Genre: Novel
- Publisher: Little, Brown & Company
- Publication date: 6 September 2006
- Publication place: United States
- Media type: Print (Paperback)
- Pages: 288 pp
- ISBN: 978-0-316-01094-8
- OCLC: 70114382
- LC Class: PZ7.D3473 Am 2006
- Preceded by: Some Like It Hot
- Followed by: Heart of Glass

American Beauty is the seventh novel in the A-List series by Zoey Dean. It was released in 2006 through Megan Tingley Publishers.

== Plot summary ==
It is graduation time for the A-List crew. Despite the festivities, Anna is not in a partying mood. Ben has been acting distant and she is worried. Ever since her illicit kiss with Parker, Sam has been Eduardo-less and heartbroken. Cammie does not care about graduation, not when she is so close to unraveling the mystery of her mother's death. She will stop at nothing to find out the truth.

The book starts out with Anna driving to Sam's pre-graduation party on her father's new yacht. While talking to Cyn, her best friend from New York, she stops to let a couple cross the street, and a woman hits the back of her car.
