= Letting Ana Go =

2013 young adult novel

- First edition
- Author: Anonymous
- Language: English
- Genre: young adult coming-of-age
- Publisher: Simon & Schuster Books for Young Readers
- Publication date: 2013
- Publication place: United States
- ISBN: 9781442472235 (hardcover edition)
- OCLC: 859393680

Letting Ana Go is a 2013 book about a girl suffering from anorexia nervosa, published anonymously with no discernible author. The main character, "Ana", is a sophomore student and athletic track star who keeps a strict food diary and finds herself growing increasingly distant from her own family, while her own mother struggles with being overweight and separation from her husband. The book calls into question the mental healthcare system in The United States and the financial cost of such care as a barrier to sufferers of issues like eating disorders. Letting Ana Go was published under various imprints of Simon & Schuster in 2013.

== Plot ==
An anonymous author, using the name "Ana" as her pseudonym, shares her story of regressing into full-blown anorexia as her parents deal with family dysfunction. Ana's mother constantly expresses a negative self-perception of her own overweight body, while Ana's father has a girlfriend with a skinny waist and large breasts. While Ana's parents are well-off financially, their increasing arguments impact the direction of their spending habits, and they fail to express much love or affection towards Ana; Ana's father presents her with a car as a birthday present, but otherwise does nothing else symbolic for the occasion, leaving Ana feeling alone and unappreciated.

Ana begins keeping a food diary with a friend, wealthy fellow student Jill, and they both try to lose as much weight as possible for their track team, which transmutes into an obsession with getting on a ballet troupe's list and exploring thinspiration websites. This intermingles with Ana's parents breaking up, and her mother constantly buying too-small clothing sizes while trying to fit into them despite her burgeoning obesity. The family's money begins to dwindle, and Ana takes her mother's self-deprecating statements to heart, such as "nothing tastes as good as thin feels", and continues losing weight until she is admitted to a local hospital due to physical health complications. Ana dies as her family cannot afford to send her to a special care facility for minor children suffering from eating disorders, while Jill, whose parents are rich, is able to recover in comfort.

== Reception ==
Letting Ana Go received mixed reviews from critics. Publishers Weekly said of the book, "this harrowing cautionary tale (in the vein of 2012’s Lucy in the Sky) demonstrates the inability of family and friends to rescue a loved one from the disease that has become her “best friend,” as an athletic high school sophomore with a healthy attitude toward food is gradually overtaken by anorexia." Reviewer Andrea of The Overstuffed Bookcase said, "I think that Letting Ana Go is a good book for women (and men, too!) to read to maybe realize what’s going on. It’s set in 2012 and 2013 so it’s completely relatable for teens (they use apps on their phones to track their calories, etc.), so they won’t be thinking it’s something that used to happen. This happens now, every day. And not just to girls, but to boys, too. I’m not sure if this is a true story (I’m assuming it’s not, but it could be), but that’s irrelevant. This is a story that needs to be told over and over again, until we as women break through that box that society has forced us in, and realize that our worth is not determined by our weight." Kirkus Reviews called the book "a disturbing tale that feels meant to titillate rather than caution... anyone familiar with the sensationalist pseudo-diary Go Ask Alice knows it won’t end well for an anonymous (fictitious) teen who chronicles her eating disorder."

Some critics were more positive about the book. For example, Karen Coats, writing for Johns Hopkins University Press, wrote that the book "echoes Go Ask Alice in presentation and appeal, but it's a sounder exploration of its focus problem." Maddie Caso, a journalist for Entity Magazine, said of the book, "The novel isn’t only about eating disorders and anorexia, it touches on divorce, staying in shape, and teenage drinking, concerns that impact a lot of teenagers. "Ana’s" parents got divorced, and she her mom worry over her own weight and stressing about the fact that they got divorced because of her weight. Both "Ana" and Jill are athletes, and there is an inherent pressure on them to stay fit or in shape. The journal so accurately depicts what it’s like living with an eating disorder, the feelings of not being good enough, the lengths people will go to to be beautiful. But the novel also brings up important political discussion around anorexia nervosa: should health insurance cover medical bills incurred because of an eating disorder? When "Ana" is admitted to a hospital for recovery, her insurance won’t cover her stay, negatively impacting her ability to recover from the disease that has so greatly impacted her life. The novel is one of the few to depict eating disorders and the negative impact they have on people’s lives. For those suffering from an eating disorder, the novel’s ending can help give them the push they need to recover, and for those who don’t suffer, it tells the story of those who do and warns people against the dangers associated with eating disorders."

== See also ==
- List of anonymously published works
- List of fictional portrayals of eating disorders
