= Anne Frank and Me =

2001 novel

- First edition
- Author: Cherie Bennett and Jeff Gottesfeld
- Language: English
- Genre: Historical fiction, Teenage literature
- Publisher: Putnam
- Publication date: November, 2001
- Publication place: United States
- Media type: Print (Paperback)
- Pages: 291 p.
- ISBN: 0-439-37131-7

Anne Frank and Me is a 2001 novel by husband and wife writing team Cherie Bennett and Jeff Gottesfeld. Inspired by the life of Anne Frank, it follows a teenage girl named Nicole Burns who travels back in time to 1942 and inhabits the body of a Jewish Holocaust victim. The novel was adapted from a play written and directed by Bennett in 1996.

== Plot summary ==
Nicole Burns, a fifteen-year-old American high school student living in the year 2001, becomes fascinated with a Holocaust survivor named Paulette Littzer-Gold, who speaks to her English class. She feels they have met before. During a trip to a local Holocaust museum, Nicole and her peers are assigned roles as Jewish teens living during the Holocaust. Nicole is given the name Nicole Bernhardt. After the activity begins, Nicole hears students shrieking and gunfire. She attempts to run along with the rest of her classmates, but is struck in the back while ascending a staircase and loses consciousness.

Nicole wakes to find herself in 1942 Paris in the body of Nicole Bernhardt. Over the course of several months, she begins to forget her life in 2001 and internalizes her new identity. Several of Nicole's friends are non-Jews who oppose Adolf Hitler's policies and protect the Bernhardt family. Following the Nazi invasion of France, Nicole is forced to hide in a rundown apartment in the streets of Paris. From her refuge, Nicole writes a string of anti-Nazi letters for the French resistance. In the letters, she calls herself "GirlX" after the website she runs back home.

The Bernhardt family is betrayed and Nicole is transported to Auschwitz. Aboard the train, she meets Anne Frank. Nicole tells Anne she has read her diary, but Anne says she left her diary in the attic where she had been hiding. At Auschwitz, a fellow Jew tries to save Nicole by sending her to the labor camp instead of being sent to be killed. Nicole and her sister Liz-Bette, who is very ill, are to be split up, Nicole to live and Liz-Bette to die. Nicole becomes hysterical and begs to be allowed to accompany her sister. The Germans, after mocking Nicole's devotion to Liz-Bette, allow her to go with the young girl. Nicole tearfully thanks them and then walks with Liz-Bette to the "showers," where they recite a Jewish prayer before dying.

Nicole wakes up, lying on a bench outside the museum. She finds out that other students had set off firecrackers which sent everyone running, when she bumped her head. Nicole wonders if she really did go back in time or whether it was all a dream. After a few days' stay in the hospital, Nicole finds out Mrs. Littzer-Gold died overnight. She decides to go to Mrs. Littzer-Gold's funeral. After the funeral, Nicole notices that a letter Mrs. Littzer-Gold owned was one of the GirlX letters that Nicole herself had written, back in Paris in 1942. Nicole realizes that not only did she really experience the Holocaust firsthand, but she gave Mrs. Littzer-Gold the courage to survive.

== Reviews ==
Reviews were mixed to negative. Kliatt called Anne Frank and Me a "powerful and affecting story" which "makes the deprivations and degradation of the Nazi occupation come alive." Publishers Weekly was not impressed, calling the novel "long on gimmickry and short on history." The reviewer pointed to "flimsy" writing and felt the time travel was "inconsistent and incompletely developed." Similarly, Kirkus Reviews accused the story of "pounding the reader over the head with the message" using "trite and forced" dialogue. Both periodicals compared it unfavorably with The Devil's Arithmetic by Jane Yolen.
