= The Center of Winter =

2005 novel by Marya Hornbacher

- Author: Marya Hornbacher
- Language: English
- Genre: Fiction
- Publisher: Harper Perennial
- Publication date: 2005
- Pages: 352 paperback; 336 hardcover
- ISBN: 0-06-092968-5
- OCLC: 54882030
- Dewey Decimal: 813/.6 22
- LC Class: PS3608.O7625 C46 2005

The Center of Winter is a novel by the American author Marya Hornbacher. It was published by Harper Perennial in early 2005.

It follows the aftermath of a father's suicide and takes place over the course of a year.

According to Publishers Weekly: "Hornbacher is a gifted writer, skilled at capturing the intense sensations of childhood and possessed of a particular talent for dialogue, but the indiscriminate ratcheting up of emotion and large doses of wise-child winsomeness give the novel a precious edge."
