= Zoey Dean =

American novelist

- Occupation: Writer
- Writing career
- Period: 2003–present
- Genres: Comedy young-adult
- Notable work: A-List series

Zoey Dean is the pseudonym for the creators of The A-List series and How to Teach Filthy Rich Girls, which has been renamed and turned into a TV show known as Privileged on the CW in September 2008. Zoey Dean's books are produced by the media packager Alloy Entertainment, which created Gossip Girl, The Clique Series, and The A-List and sold them to Little, Brown and Company. Books from The Talent Series started appearing in 2008.

According to a biography provided by Alloy Entertainment, Zoey Dean "divides her time between her house in Beverly Hills and lounging around on her favorite small Caribbean islands". In 2006, The New York Times described Zoey Dean as "a pseudonym for a married writing team". The pseudonym has been jointly used by writers Cherie Bennett and Jeff Gottesfeld.

== Bibliography ==
=== Young adult novels ===
==== The A-List ====
1. The A-List (2003)
2. Girls on Film (2003)
3. Blonde Ambition (2005)
4. Tall Cool One (2005)
5. Back in Black (2005)
6. Some Like It Hot (2006)
7. American Beauty (2006)
8. Heart of Glass (2007)
9. Beautiful Stranger (2007)
10. California Dreaming (2008)

==== The A-List: Hollywood Royalty ====
1. Hollywood Royalty (January 2009)
2. Sunset Boulevard (August 2009)
3. City of Angels (March 2010)

==== Talent series ====
1. Talent
2. Almost Famous (2008)
3. Star Power (2009)
4. Young Hollywood (2009) (never released)

=== Other novels ===
1. Privileged (2008) (formerly published under the name How to Teach Filthy Rich Girls)
2. Hollywood is Like High School With Money (July 2009)
