= Life in the Fat Lane =

Book by Cherie Bennett

- First edition
- Author: Cherie Bennett
- Country: United States
- Language: English
- Genre: Young adult fiction
- Publisher: Delacorte Press
- Published: 1998
- Media type: Print

Life in the Fat Lane is a novel for young adults written by Cherie Bennett. The novel was included among the American Library Association Best Books for Young Adults. It was published in 1998 by Delacorte Press.

In 2000, the novel won the Texas TAYSHAS High School Reading List. The novel is included in The Big Book of Teen Reading Lists, a composed list of inspirational fiction and non-fiction titles divided by age levels.

Cherie Bennett obtained the idea of the novel from her readers because she writes about real life issues many young girls are affected by. The novel reflects a girl living in a perfect world. She suddenly faces a traumatic disease which cause her to gain over 100 pounds in only a few months, with no cure, and her whole world turns upside down.

Cherie Bennett was commissioned to write a theatrical adaptation of Life in the Fat Lane by the Cincinnati Playhouse in the Park. The play won the Lazarus-Macy New Play Award.

== Plot ==
The novel's main character is Lara Ardeche. According to Lara, her family life is perfect because her parents are youthful, beautiful, and involve themselves in every aspect of her and her brother's lives. She is elected homecoming queen for her high school, following in her mother's footsteps, and she is her father's "princess". Each morning is a daily routine of waking up in a glamorous home, eating a healthy but delicious home-cooked meal, and working out in her home gym given to the family by their wealthy grandpa. Her best friend Molly is the complete opposite. She is overweight, her family life is a wreck, and her nickname is "the Mouth", but she has a sarcastic sense of humor in spite of all this.

Shortly before winning Homecoming Queen, Lara takes pity on an obese classmate named Patty Asher and offers to help her lose weight. Soon after, Lara notices that she slowly but steadily gains weight, no matter how much she works out, diets, or even starves herself. Her thin and perfect mother begs Lara to do anything she can to keep the weight off and her father eventually stops calling her "princess". Every one of Lara's so-called friends abandons her, except for Molly and Lara's boyfriend Jett. Within months, Lara gains 100 pounds. After seeking over fifty medical doctors, she is diagnosed with a rare and incurable metabolic disorder called "Axell-Crowne" syndrome. Patty pops up and visits Lara shortly before her diagnosis, happily gloating about the fact Lara has gained a massive amount of weight and is now fatter than her. Even Lara's former friends now openly gloat about her weight gain. Her relationship with Jett begins to deteriorate, along with her entire family's relationship, once Lara's dad announces that he is having an affair.

In order to try to hold up the last strings of the family, the Ardeches move to Michigan from Nashville to begin a new start, but Lara is having an even harder time at this high school. People refer to the once 118 pound girl as the "obese girl" and nobody believes that she truly has a rare but severe disease. Her home life becomes more chaotic, with her father making it painfully obvious he is still cheating on his wife, and her mother's desperate attempts to keep her husband. This leads to a nasty confrontation between Lara and her mother, revealing that her father has been seeing his other woman for three years, long before Lara gained weight, crushing her assumption he is cheating on his wife because of her. She begins to view her mother as pathetic and her father as philandering, adopting her brother Scott's views (this explains the intense relationship between father and son early in the novel, with Scott discovering the affair all those years ago).

After breaking up with Jett, Lara finds her life in complete and utter turmoil. Lara begins taking piano classes in her new home to occupy her boredom and is introduced to a new group of friends. She finds that they are some of the most genuine people she's ever met, and do not use looks as a means of creating friendships. In particular, one of these friends is a blind boy who appreciates Lara for her true self. As a result, Lara begins accepting herself and believing in who she is. However, she feels somewhat conflicted with her past self, with Jett returning and begging for Lara to take him back. Despite being confused about her feelings towards her past, she has different perceptions on what relationships need to have in order to sustain. Although the weight is slowly coming off, Lara finally realizes a thin body is not the key to happiness.

The novel concludes with Lara being temporarily reunited with Molly and telling the reader that, while her life is not perfect like it used to be, she is perfectly fine with this.

== Characters ==
- Lara Ardeche is the main character of the novel. Lara is a 118-pound, 5'7" blonde, pageant winner, and she is elected homecoming queen of her high school. Despite her high social status at school, she makes an effort to be nice to people, although she feels uncomfortable standing up to her friends. She becomes diagnosed with a severely chronic weight disorder and gains over one hundred pounds in less than a year. Lara is hardworking and a talented piano player. Throughout the novel, she discovers what is truly important in life and realizes popularity does not bring happiness. She begins to value herself for more than just what she looks like.
- Molly is Lara's best friend. She is disliked by Lara's "popular" friends and is not afraid to speak her mind. She and Lara have been best friends since elementary school. People at school refer to Molly as "The Mouth" because she is truthful and blunt about her opinions. She is a tad dorky and overweight, with a sense of humor.
- Carol Ardeche is Lara's mother. She is an overachiever and strives for perfection for herself and her family. She believes looks are everything and that her husband will not love her unless she stays youthful, fit, and beautiful. She is afraid of her husband leaving her for a younger version of herself. She won homecoming queen for her high school twenty years ago and wants her daughter to follow in her foot steps. When she learns of her husband's affair, she involves herself with starvation, alcohol, and pain killers. Towards the end of the novel, she forces the family to move to Michigan to start a new life in hopes that this move will repair the family. She is a mother who deeply cares for her daughter, but still believes being beautiful is the only means of being successful in life.
- Jim "Jimbo" Ardeche is Lara's father. He refers to Lara as his "princess". in the beginning of the novel. Once she begins gaining weight, he slowly detaches himself from his daughter and the rest of the family. Every few weekends, which turns into every week, he is out of town on company business trips. When Lara's weight disorder finally hits rock bottom, he announces to his family he is actually having an affair with a woman who lives only twenty minutes away. He agrees to end the affair with the woman as long as his wife will stay with him, but the affair doesn't end even when the family moves to Michigan.
- Jett becomes Lara's boyfriend shortly after she wins homecoming queen but before her weight gaining disease. According to Lara and Molly, he is unlike the other boys at their high school. He is tall, handsome, and genuinely nice, and he and Lara have a great relationship. He continues to stay with Lara through the beginning of her disease, but slowly he stops treating her like he used to. She feels as if he is embarrassed to be with her. When she confronts him, Jett simply says that "beauty is in the eye of the beholder" and he thinks she is beautiful, but over time Lara becomes fed up with him acting differently, despite what he says, and ends their relationship. She finds out shortly after ending their relationship that Jett has another girlfriend. However, he and Molly go to visit Lara at the end of the novel, and he confesses he feels badly about how their relationship ended.
- Suzanne is Lara's piano instructor in Michigan. She is very overweight but has a beautiful face and curly, dark hair. Her boyfriend is very attractive and Lara wonders how such a large woman could obtain such an attractive man. Suzanne is a young woman full of inspiration. Beauty is simply a word to Suzanne. She introduces Lara to musically inclined people of all ages, a group within which Lara eventually finds part of herself. Lara reminds Suzanne of herself in some ways, so despite Lara's cool attitude toward her in the beginning, she still accepts Lara for who she is and welcomes her into her group of friends. She gives Lara courage, inspiration, and the ability to accept herself for who she is.
- Scott is Lara's younger brother, a middle schooler at the beginning of the novel but a freshman when they move to Michigan. Scott is a skateboarder, wears baggy clothing, and listens to grunge and rock music. He's extremely cute and seems to be popular, but he can't stand his father because, as he confesses to Lara, he walked in on him and Tamara Pines, the woman he has an affair with, kissing at a holiday party. This was the day Scott lost all respect for his dad, and now seems to live to make him mad. He sees his family for what they truly are.
- Jennie Smith a more minor character. The thinnest girl in the school in Nashville, Jennie is a snobby girl whom Lara is nice to because she's thin and Lara feels like she's supposed to like her, but she really doesn't care for Jennie much. Jennie constantly makes other girls feel bad about their weight and moans about eating too much, when she eats hardly anything. She has a crush on Jett and tries to steal him from Lara. Also, she seems to become the new most popular girl after Lara. Lara tells her off near the end of the novel.
- Patty Asher another minor, yet crucial, character. Patty is an obese, bullied classmate of Lara and Molly. When Lara attempts to help her with her weight problem, Patty expresses disgust with Lara's "stuck-up," superior attitude, and foreshadows Lara's weight gain. Patty then gloats about Lara's condition while visiting her in the hospital, and admits she had fervently wished Lara would gain a lot of weight so Lara could know what it was like to be fat and insulted on a regular basis.

== Reception ==
Life in the Fat Lane has received many positive reviews by Publishers Weekly, Amazon Books, and Good Reads. Publishers Weekly said, "Reading this often artificial novel for insight into [issues of weight, self-image and beauty] is a little like eating peanut M&M's for the protein, but it's a similarly addictive experience". According to the Children's BookPage Review, "Bennett accurately portrays Lara's struggles to deal with her imperfect life and the many compounding family problems she had been too self-absorbed to notice before her weight problem. She battles self-hatred, learns who her true friends are, feels her father's embarrassment and denial of her disorder, and faces prejudice as an overweight person". Annotated by Marilyn Chandler McEntyre from the Literature, Arts, and Medicine database, "It's a useful book for looking at fat as a social issue, a family issue, and a problem that bears reframing". According to an anonymous reviewer, he believes "Life in the Fat Lane is a life-inspiring book. It deals with real life problems and things kids and adults go through everyday. This is a book of slow pace but has a wild ride of events during this book. I recommend this book to the young adults but mostly to girls. Girls can relate to the character Lara to help them understand the story well". On the other side, there is a small percentage of critics that negatively reviewed the novel. Book reviewer, Theresa McAdams, believes "There was no humor, no irony, and really no message at all. I really don't like the idea of teenage girls reading this book, because either way I think this book could actually egg on the stereotype that girls are only valuable if they are thin".
