= Wasted: A Memoir of Anorexia and Bulimia =

1997 book by Marya Hornbacher

- First edition
- Author: Marya Hornbacher
- Language: English
- Genre: Autobiography
- Publisher: HarperCollins
- Publication date: 1997
- Publication place: United States

Wasted: A Memoir of Anorexia and Bulimia is an autobiography written by Marya Hornbacher, detailing her fourteen-year battle with eating disorders. Published by HarperCollins in 1997, Wasted was a critical and commercial success. The author's young age (she wrote the book at the age of 21) surprised many readers, and the memoir was praised for its maturity and candor.

Wasted has sold in the United States over a million copies and has been translated into fourteen languages.

== Critical reception ==
In a review for The New York Times, Caroline Knapp calls the book "a gritty, unflinching look at eating disorders," adding, "Hornbacher is at her best when she zeroes in on the specifics of eating disorders and their origins...Such phenomena aren't new to the literature on eating disorders, but Hornbacher describes them with a stark candor that captures both their pain and underlying purposes."

== See also ==
- Anorexia nervosa
- Hunger for Life
