= The Best Little Girl in the World =

1981 American television film

- The Best Little Girl in the World
- Genre: Drama
- Based on: The Best Little Girl in the World by Steven Levenkron
- Teleplay by: David Moessinger
- Directed by: Sam O'Steen
- Starring: Jennifer Jason Leigh
- Theme music composer: Billy Goldenberg
- Country of origin: United States
- Original language: English

Production
- Executive producers: Douglas S. Cramer; Aaron Spelling
- Producer: Lynn Loring
- Cinematography: Michael D. Margulies
- Editor: Barbara Dies
- Running time: 100 min.
- Production company: Aaron Spelling Productions

Original release
- Network: ABC
- Release: May 11, 1981

The Best Little Girl in the World is a 1981 television film directed by Sam O'Steen and executive produced by Aaron Spelling. The film is based upon the 1979 novel of the same name written by Steven Levenkron.

== Plot ==
Seventeen-year-old Casey Powell is a shy teenaged cheerleader who gets good grades and dreams of being a professional ballet dancer. Her parents, Frank and Joanne, give all their attention to her 19-year-old sister Gail, who has just found out she is pregnant by someone she has no interest in marrying. Frank is infuriated and Joanne is worried, so they forget to spend time with Casey; not a new thing, as problem-child Gail has always drawn attention away from good-girl Casey. Feeling ignored by her parents and embarrassed by harassment at her cheerleading audition, Casey starts wanting to look like the models on the covers of magazines and begins to diet and exercise.

Casey is noticed by her ballet teacher, Madame Seuart, who tells her that she could be very good if she loses a few pounds. It doesn't take long before Casey becomes anorexic and bulimic. Casey's parents ignore her dream of becoming a professional dancer and instead want her to graduate high school, get a good job, and then become a wife and mother. Over the next two months, Casey's illness progresses as she throws herself into dieting and ballet dancing which causes Gail to worry that something is wrong with her. Her grades in school begin to deteriorate, which finally draws her parents' attention; however, Gail's attempts to support Casey cause more fights with their parents and distracts them from Casey.

When Gail sees how thin Casey has become, she is horrified and warns her parents. Casey is sent to a doctor who orders her to start eating normally again, threatening to send her to a hospital if she doesn't. Despite the pressure, Casey continues her eating disorder in secret. Frank finds her diet pills and tries to force her to eat, but she refuses. After feeling ignored at a party, Casey lies to her parents about having eaten at the party. Frank doesn't believe her and tries to force feed her a peanut butter sandwich, but Casey bites his hand. In an attempt to mend things with her family, Casey makes her family breakfast and even eats it with them, but is discouraged when she finds out that her mother has decided to go to her sister's lamaze class and shop for baby supplies instead. Because her parents took away her diet pills and laxatives, Casey attempts to steal more from the pharmacy the next day; however, she is caught and arrested. Her parents bail her out, but she collapses outside of the police station and is taken to the hospital. She tries to run away, but collapses in the attempt and is re-captured.

In the hospital, Casey befriends fellow patient Carol Link, who is also suffering from anorexia and bulimia. Carol gives Casey advice about how to be kicked out of the hospital and teaches her tricks to mislead the doctors. However, Casey later watches Carol's death from a pill overdose. Crushed and devastated, she runs away again but collapses for the third time. When she regains consciousness, Casey is angry that she's back in the hospital. In a turning point, she tells her doctor, Clay Orlovsky, that she is afraid to die as well; he assures her that she won't, but only if she starts being honest with him and makes a genuine effort to recover.

When Casey improves, she is finally allowed to see her family again; Dr. Orlovsky watches and analyzes their reunion. Gail and Frank argue, Joanne acts as peacemaker, and Casey sits in a corner and stays out of the way. Dr. Olovsky tells the family that he thinks Casey developed her eating disorder because she felt ignored and neglected by her family and she viewed it as the only way for her to get their attention. Despite being a delight - good grades, good student, polite, pretty, dedicated, and an excellent dancer - Casey has been ignored and sidelined in favor of Gail. Her personality forces her to strive for perfection in everything, including her appearance, and she seeks control in her diet because she feels out of control in the rest of her life.

After a while, Casey begins to recover and is released from the hospital. She doesn't want to leave, however, and feels safer with Dr. Orlovsky than with her family. In the final scene, she is able to enjoy eating ice cream.

== Cast ==
(in credits order)

- Charles Durning as Frank Powell
- Eva Marie Saint as Joanne Powell
- Jennifer Jason Leigh as Casey Powell
- Melanie Mayron as Carol Link
- Lisa Pelikan as Gail Powell
- Viveca Lindfors as Madame Seurat
- David Spielberg as Dr. Garett
- Jason Miller as Clay Orlovsky
- Richard Venture as Dr. Neil Holzer
- Lenora May as Julie
- Laurence Lau as Mark
- Michael Dudikoff as Chuck
- Stephanie Cockington as Mary
- Ally Sheedy as First Girl
- Andrea Pope as Michelle
- Richard Milholland as Dr. Norman
- Jonathan Estrin as Dr. Shuster
- Lang Yun as Nurse Prine
- Pat Corley as Store Manager
- Enid Kent as First Nurse
- Gwen Van Dam as Nurse
- Ruth Silveira as Second Nurse
- Marilyn Coleman as Emergency Nurse
- Paul Laurence as Respiratory Therapist

== Production ==
Producer Aaron Spelling came to the idea of making a movie about the book. Jennifer Jason Leigh replaced Jodie Foster, who was at one point assigned to play the lead. Leigh lost weight to play the role, weighing 86 pounds at the start of shooting. Actors Jason Miller and Charles Durning were close friends; Durning's career-making performance was in Miller's 1973 Pulitzer Prize winning play That Championship Season.

== Reception ==
The film's reception was generally positive; in particular, Leigh was praised for her portrayal of a teenager. The film gained attention again in 1983, when singer/drummer Karen Carpenter died of complications from anorexia nervosa. Although the film was later released on VHS, it is now quite rare.

The film, however, received criticism for its portrayal of treatment for anorexia victims, which was thought to be unrealistic. Another criticism was that its plot differed too much from the novel.
