= Jenefer Shute =

South African novelist

Jenefer Shute is an author of four novels: Life-Size, Sex Crimes, Free Fall and User I.D.. She has also written for Harper's, The Nation, salon.com, The Guardian, Tikkun, the Boston Review, and Modern Fiction Studies.

== Biography ==
Born in Johannesburg, South Africa, she lives in Hudson, New York. She has a Ph.D. in literature from the University of California and was, until recently, a professor at Hunter College of the City University of New York, where she taught in the MFA program in creative writing. She has also taught at Emerson College in Boston, the University of Paris, and the University of Cape Town, where she gained her first degree in English. From 2012 to 2016, she lived in Cape Town and worked as a fiction editor for Penguin Random House, South Africa.

== Novels ==
- Life-Size (Houghton Mifflin, 1992)
- Sex Crimes (Doubleday, 1996)
- Free Fall (Secker & Warburg, 2002)
- User I.D. (Houghton Mifflin, 2005)
