= Tall Cool One (novel) =

2005 novel by Zoey Dean

- Author: Zoey Dean
- Language: English
- Series: The A-List
- Genre: Novel
- Publisher: Little Brown
- Publication date: April 2005
- Publication place: United States
- Media type: Print (Paperback)
- Pages: 295 pp
- ISBN: 0-316-73508-6
- OCLC: 57465660
- LC Class: PZ7.D3473 Tal 2005
- Preceded by: Blonde Ambition
- Followed by: Back in Black

Tall Cool One is the fourth novel in the "A-List" series by Zoey Dean. It was released in 2005 by Little, Brown.

== Plot summary ==
At the beginning of the novel, Anna is at the beach with Danny, the producer she met while interning for Clark Sheppard on Hermosa Beach, learning to surf but can't seem to get it. The two end up having a conversation about one-night stands. Dan claims Anna isn't the type to have one but Anna claims that she would and that she doesn't think casual sex is bad even though she has only had sex with Ben, who has returned to Princeton. Her relationship with him is not certain between both of them but Anna thinks that them two have broken up or at least, are on a break.

Once Anna returns home she finds her mother and father on the couch in her father's house in Los Angeles having a drink. She finds this shocking because since the divorce, her parents couldn't stand to be in the same room. Her father explains that her sister Susan is coming out of rehab and that her doctor suggested that they meet her as a whole family.

Sam is also having her own family problems as her new stepmother Poppy has taken over the whole house to prepare for Sam's soon to be sister, Ruby Hummingbird. To Sam's further dismay, Dee has become fast friends with Poppy and even moves in to help with the baby preparations, causing Sam to feel ignored. She joins Anna at Las Casitas, not caring that the whole Sharpe family is supposed to appear on The Tonight Show together.

Meanwhile, Cammie and Adam's relationship is growing, but they have not had sex yet which Cammie finds strange. She tries to seduce him on the beach but Adam refuses and Cammie realizes he is a virgin, finding it sweet. Still, she doesn't want people to think she has lost her reputation as a vixen and so Cammie tells everyone she and Adam are having amazing sex, unbeknownst to him. Cammie and Adam do attempt to have sex throughout the course of the book but they are always interrupted. Eventually, she and Adam agree to wait until the time is right.

The two take shelter in a seemingly empty mansion as a thunderstorm begins while Kai and Eduardo realize the girls are missing. Eduardo calls Jackson Sharpe, who cancels the Jay Leno appearance to go to Mexico to search for Sam. A search party begins and in the morning, Sam and Anna are discovered by the guards of the owner who owns the place. The two explain their story and are rescued by Jackson and his helicopter. Anna is a little jealous and hurt that her own father didn't come also. Sam is confused when Eduardo acts coldly to her after they return to Las Casitas but shrugs it off as they are now going their separate ways. However, back in Beverly Hills, Sam throws a party with her friends who all eagerly demand to know the details of the rescue and Eduardo shows up to apologize for mistreating Sam and asks her out on another date. Also, Anna's parents once again part separate ways and she is relieved. With her head clear, Anna is finally able to surf properly, much to her delight.

== Reception ==
In 2005, Tall Cool One was nominated for the Quills Award for Young Adult/Teen Fiction.
