= Back in Black (novel) =

2005 novel by Zoey Dean

- Author: Zoey Dean
- Language: English
- Genre: Novel
- Publisher: Little Brown
- Publication date: 1 September 2005
- Publication place: United States
- Media type: Print (Paperback)
- Pages: 304 pp
- ISBN: 0-316-01092-8
- OCLC: 58729776
- LC Class: PZ7.D3473 Bac 2005
- Preceded by: Tall Cool One
- Followed by: Some Like It Hot

Back in Black is the fifth novel in the juvenile fiction A-List series by Zoey Dean. It was first released in September 2005 through Little, Brown and Company and re-released by Poppy in 2008.

== Plot summary ==
The A-List crew, consisting of Sam, Anna, Dee, Parker, Adam, and Cammie decide to forgo the Spring Break school sponsored trip to Washington D.C. in favor of heading over to Las Vegas instead. Anna misses Ben, who is away at school, and she impulsively invites him to join her and their friends in Vegas too. She also mentions the trip to her best friend from New York, Cyn Baltres, who is impressed with the way Anna has reinvented herself.

Parker Pinelli is worried because he is secretly poor and doesn't have enough money to cover the expenses for their luxurious get away but refuses to confide in any of his friends, fearing they'll kick him off the A-list if they knew the truth. He tries to gamble but is unsuccessful as the Las Vegas laws forbid minors from collecting any winnings so he hooks up with a series of wealthier and older women to cover his costs. No one in the group notices and figure Parker is just a lady killer and decide to kick off their break with a "tacky showgirl outfit contest". The girls eagerly participate although Cammie sneaks away to an undisclosed location which causes Adam to worry that she is cheating on him.

At dinner, the group is joined by none other by Cyn and her boyfriend Scott Spencer, a handsome intellectual Anna secretly had a crush on before coming to L.A. The crew decides to visit a hypnotist, although Dee bows out in favor of trying to help the sinners of Las Vegas reform. Dee's friends are a little bit worried for her as this goes beyond her normal interests in New Age or spiritual fads. Dee has Ruby Hummingbird, Sam's new half sister, on the mind and she frequently calls Poppy in a worry, claiming that she and Ruby Hummingbird have a spiritual connection. Dee begins to hear voices and believes it is Ruby Hummingbird trying to contact her.

Meanwhile, at the hypnotist, Sam is the only one of her friends who doesn't get hypnotized and she watches in shock as everyone's secrets are revealed: Adam admits that sometimes he finds other girls attractive, Cammie admits that she feels Adam can be boring sometimes, and Anna admits her secret crush on Scott. None of them remember what they said and eagerly buy a recording of the show. Sam tries to convince the others not to watch but fails and now everyone is angry with everyone: Adam and Cammie begin to argue about their relationship and Cyn refuses to speak to Anna. However, all is forgotten when Dee suffers a mental breakdown and the crew rush to the hospital to see her.

Dee is fine, although she has elected to spend some time at Ojai Mental Hospital. Relieved that Dee is fine although saddened she won't be at BHH anymore, the group returns to their hotel. Scott takes Anna aside and tells her it wouldn't work out between them and Ana realizes she only liked the idea of him and agrees, although still extremely embarrassed. She makes up with Cyn who tells her that she isn't mad because Anna was secretly lusting for her boyfriend—she was mad that Anna never confided her crush in the first place. Cyn also tells Anna that she and Scott are about to break up, if Anna wants to make a play for him but Anna declines. Meanwhile, Sam finds Parker at the bar and finds out he is poor. She promises not to tell and is impressed with the way he refuses her offer to cover his expenses. Adam and Cammie make up and Cammie admits where she had been sneaking off to—to the house of a platonic family friend who lives in Las Vegas. Said friend invites the crew to his for a party.

At the end, before they go back to Beverly Hills, Ben shows up and Anna stays behind with him. They talk about their relationship and Ben confesses that he's seeing someone at school, Blythe, but it is not serious. In the end, Anna and Ben decide to get back together.
