= Cherie Bennett =

American dramatist (born 1960)

- Born: 1960 (age 65–66); Buffalo, New York, U.S.
- Education: Wayne State University; University of Michigan
- Occupations: Novelist; actress; director; playwright; newspaper columnist; singer; television writer
- Spouse: Jeff Gottesfeld (divorced)
- Children: 1
- Writing career
- Pen name: C.J. Anders; Carrie Austen; Zoey Dean

Cherie Bennett (born Sharon Lynne Berman, October 6, 1960 in Buffalo, New York) is an American novelist, actress, director, playwright, newspaper columnist, singer, and television writer on the CBS Daytime soap opera The Young and the Restless.

== Biography ==
Bennett was born in Buffalo, New York to Roslyn Cantor and Bennett Berman. Her father was a writer for such shows as The Twilight Zone, Route 66, and Sid Caesar's Your Show of Shows.

Bennett attended Wayne State University, and then the University of Michigan in the early 1980s, as a musical theatre major. She worked as an actress, doing national musical tours, regional theatre productions including Mark Medoff's When You Comin' Back, Red Ryder? and a well-reviewed turn in the off-Broadway revival of Tennessee Williams' Twenty-Seven Wagons Full of Cotton. She headed her own improv comedy trio, Zaniac, and performed as a vocalist, singing backup for John Mellencamp and in her play, Honk Tonk Angels.

Bennett lives in Los Angeles with her son. Her pseudonyms are C.J. Anders and Carrie Austen. For many years, she wrote frequently with Jeff Gottesfeld, with whom she shared the Zoey Dean pseudonym. She and Gottesfeld are divorced.

Since June 2011, she's been the Artistic Director at Amusings Productions in Sherman Oaks.

== Television credits ==
The Young and the Restless (hired by Lynn Marie Latham; fired by Maria Arena Bell)

- Script Writer: December 14, 2006 - December 21, 2007; March 18 - August 19, 2008
- Associate Head Writer: July 2007 - December 21, 2007; March 18 - July 10, 2008

As the World Turns (hired by Hogan Sheffer)

- Breakdown Writer: 2005

Port Charles (hired by Lynn Marie Latham)

- Story Consultant: 1998

Another World

- Story Consultant: 1997

Girls Got Game: 2006

Smallville: 2001 - 2002

== Books ==
Book Series

- Sunset Island (forty-one book series)
- Dawson's Creek (seven original novels)
- Mirror Image (four book series)
- Hope Hospital (three book series)

Six Book Series

- University Hospital
- Wild Hearts
- Teen Angels
- Trash
- Pageant

Other Books

- Turn Me On (July 2007)
- Girls in Love
- Zink
- Life in the Fat Lane
- A Heart Divided
- Anne Frank and Me
- Searching for David's Heart

== Plays ==
- John Lennon And Me
- Sex And Rage In A SoHo Loft
- Life In The Fat Lane
- Zink
- Searching for David's Heart
- A Heart Divided
- Cyra And Rocky
- Reviving Ophelia (adapted from the book by Dr. Mary Pipher)

== Films ==
- Broken Bridges (Writer: 2006)

== Newspaper column ==
- "Hey, Cherie!" (Weekly teen advice column through Copley News Service)

== Awards and nominations ==
- Daytime Emmy: Outstanding Drama Series Writing Team, 2008
- Macy's Prize For Playwriting: Reviving Ophelia, 2005–2006
- Humanitas Award: Best children's film for television (Searching For David's Heart, 2005)
- American Library Association: Best Books For Young Adults, 2005 nominee (A Heart Divided)
- International Reading Association: Young Adult Readers' Choice, Anne Frank And Me, 2003
- American Alliance of Theater And Education UPR, 2000 winner (David's Heart)
- American Library Association: Best Books For Young Adults, 1999
