= Life-Size (novel) =

1992 novel by Jenefer Shute

- First edition (US)
- Author: Jenefer Shute
- Language: English
- Publisher: Houghton Mifflin (US); Secker & Warburg (UK)
- Publication date: 1992
- Publication place: United States
- Media type: Print
- Pages: 231
- ISBN: 0-395-60479-6

Life-Size is the debut novel by South African author Jenefer Shute, published in 1992 and is a Literary Guild selection. It is a first person account of Josie, a twenty-five-year-old graduate in economics, who has anorexia and is hospitalised in an attempt to stop her from starving herself to death.

== Reception ==
- Susan Reynolds writing in the Los Angeles Times was unsympathetic to the main character "In the end, you might understand Josie, but you still don't like her; Shute has successfully created a character almost beyond empathy. Josie is relentlessly mean spirited, so alienated that you can hardly feel sorry for her in your haste to get away from her. She takes all the sap out of life, and she does it so actively and aggressively that it's hard to see her as a victim."
- In contrast Marek Kohn writing in The Independent is far more positive: "a mordantly funny novel, though. In addition to its beady eyed wit, Life-Size offers vital insight, stark and even lyrical by turns, into how anorexia looks from the inside. As a first novel, it is a virtuoso performance. Based on feminist analyses of the condition, as deriving from the tyranny of body images, its translation of theory into character is a notable achievement.
- The NYU School of Medicine praises the book's authenticity: "Shute has researched the topic and reveals many of the traits which characterize this illness. The author’s narrative technique aptly conveys the preoccupations of the protagonist; obsessive thinking is well delineated and gives a strong sense of how challenging it must be for caregivers to treat such patients."

== Publication history ==
- 1992, United States, Houghton Mifflin, ISBN 0-395-60479-6, Pub date Apr 1992, Hardback
- 1992, United Kingdom, Secker & Warburg, ISBN 0-436-47278-3, Pub date 10 Aug 1992, Paperback
- 1993, United Kingdom, Mandarin, ISBN 0-7493-1566-0, Pub date Jun 1993, Paperback
- 1993, United States, Avon, ISBN 0-380-72064-7, Paperback
- 1996, United Kingdom, Minerva, ISBN 0-7493-9576-1, Pub date 11 Mar 1996, Paperback
- 1997, United States, Avon, ISBN 0-380-73021-9, Pub date Aug 1997, Paperback
