= Heart of Glass (novel) =

2007 novel by Zoey Dean

- Author: Zoey Dean
- Language: English
- Series: The A-List
- Genre: Novel
- Publisher: Little Brown
- Publication date: April 2007
- Publication place: United States
- Media type: Print (Paperback)
- Pages: 320 pp
- ISBN: 0-316-01096-0
- OCLC: 85856355
- LC Class: MLCS 2006/45267
- Preceded by: American Beauty
- Followed by: Beautiful Stranger

Heart of Glass is a novel that is part of the A-List novel series. It was written by New York Times bestselling author Zoey Dean and was released in April 2007.

== Plot summary ==
The A-List crew has finally graduated and everyone is looking forward to enjoying a carefree summer but Cammie and Anna get caught trespassing and are arrested. Fortunately, the girls only have to help run a charity fashion show for New Visions, an organization to help less-fortunate girls, for their community service. There, they meet a beautiful, petite girl named Champagne, an aspiring model. Virginia Vanderleer, the head of New Visions, warns Cammie and Anna that Champagne was accused of stealing a dress not too long ago and is not to be trusted. However, Cammie takes Champagne under her wing and promises to make her a star while Anna uses her East Coast connections to pull a deal with Lizbette Demetrius, an upscale cosmetics company CEO, who promises to attend the show in person to check out Champagne.

Adam Flood has decided to spend the summer in Michigan and even tells Cammie that he might want to attend college there, much to her dismay. Cammie begins to flirt with Ben and the two almost kiss. Ben tells Cammie she has changed and if they ever get back together, it would be so much more than before. Dee is still with Jack Walker but she becomes concerned when their relationship is becoming too serious especially since she finds herself attracted to Aaron Steele, an acquaintance from Ojai.

Sam is convinced that Poppy is cheating on Jackson with Bodhi Gilad, her new yoga instructor, and enlists Parker to help her catch Poppy in the act. She offers him a deal: she will secure for Parker a part in her father's remake of Ben Hur and he will seduce Poppy in exchange. She assures him he will be kept anonymous but Parker worries that somehow Jackson will find out and will blacklist him forever in Hollywood. Sam hires a photographer to capture Poppy and Parker kissing but feels guilty afterwards and decides to destroy the pictures. However, a tabloid magazine catches Poppy and Bodhi together and when Jackson confronts her, Poppy breaks down in tears and flees, leaving Ruby Hummingbird behind. Sam is pleased Poppy is finally out of her life and comforts her betrayed father and abandoned half-sister.

Clark admits to Cammie that her mother was clinically depressed and committed suicide although she loved Cammie dearly. He leaves Cammie with a letter Jeanne wrote to be read on Cammie's wedding day but Cammie opens it and is touched by the beautiful, emotional letter. With Dee, the girls talk about their relationship woes and Cammie wishes her mother was still around. The two venture up into the attic, where they find Jeanne's old clothes. Cammie finds a familiar outfit and tries it on, finally grieving over the loss of her mother. Dee pleasantly surprises Cammie by offering wisdom and comfort.

The New Visions fashion show is a success, especially since the models used were not professionals but under-privileged girls like Champagne. However, when a dress goes missing, everyone is quick to accuse Champagne. Cammie deduces that Martin Rittenhouse, the designer, deliberately hid the dress to drum up publicity. Since Lizbette decided Champagne was not right for her company after all, Cammie coerces Martin to launch a petite fashion line and use Champagne as his star model lest she ruin his reputation. Martin quickly agrees and Champagne is thrilled.

During the after party, Cammie calls Adam and gives him an ultimatum: if he is not back in L.A. soon, they are over. Meanwhile, Anna tell Caine and Ben simultaneously, and tells them that she wants to date both of them at the same time. Caine agrees and Ben is incredulous, but eventually he kisses Anna sweetly and agrees, because he doesn't want to lose her. Cammie and Anna congratulate each other for a job well done when Cammie announces to Anna that if it doesn't work out between her and Adam, Cammie will go after Ben.
