= Steven Levenkron =

American psychotherapist and writer (born 1941)

Steven Levenkron (born March 25, 1941) is an American psychotherapist and writer known for his research into anorexia nervosa and self-injury. He holds an M.S. degree and lives in New York City, where his practice is based.

Levenkron started his research in 1970 and later took part in the National Association of Anorexia Nervosa and Associated Disorders. He gained popularity due to his 1978 novel The Best Little Girl in the World, which was recognized as a Best Books for Young Adults by the American Library Association and which later formed the basis of the American Broadcasting Company's television film The Best Little Girl in the World.

His notable clients included Karen Carpenter, who died in 1983.

In 1998, W. W. Norton & Company published Levenkron's non-fiction book Cutting: Understanding and Overcoming Self-Mutilation. In the book, he insisted that self-injury was not related to suicide in essentials.

His book The Luckiest Girl in the World is the original work of the 2000 television film Secret Cutting, produced by USA Network.

== Publications ==
- Stolen Tomorrows: Understanding and Treating Women's Childhood Sexual Abuse, 2007
- Treating and Overcoming Anorexia Nervosa, 1982
- Obsessive Compulsive Disorders, 1991
- Cutting, Understanding & Overcoming Self-Mutilation, 1998
- Anatomy of Anorexia, 2000
- The Best Little Girl in the World - work of fiction, also produced as a film
- The Luckiest Girl in the World - work of fiction, also produced as a film under the title Secret Cutting
- Kessa - work of fiction

the 8 books above have all been translated into 7 different foreign languages
