= The A-List (novel) =

2003 novel by Zoey Dean

- Author: Zoey Dean
- Language: English
- Series: The A-List
- Genre: Young adult literature Ages 15 and up
- Publisher: Megan Tingley Publishers
- Publication date: 2003
- Publication place: United States
- Pages: 228
- ISBN: 978-0-316-73435-6
- OCLC: 52853701
- LC Class: PZ7.D3473 Aae 2003
- Followed by: Girls on Film

The A-List is the first novel in The A-List series by Zoey Dean. It follows the story of a shy, privileged teenage girl who moves across the country to Los Angeles for her senior year and vows to reinvent herself as she becomes embroiled with the Beverly Hills elite. It was released in 2003 through Megan Tingley Books by Poppy.

== Plot summary ==
Seventeen-year-old Anna Percy trades her privileged life on New York City's Upper East Side to move to Los Angeles to live with her father for the second half of her senior year. While on the plane to Los Angeles, Anna develops an instant connection with the handsome Ben Birnbaum, who rescues her from an obnoxious seatmate. Ben invites Anna to be his date at the wedding of A-list action movie star Jackson Sharpe and she accepts.

Once Anna arrives in Los Angeles, she is annoyed that her father Jonathan sent his charismatic but mysterious chauffeur Django instead of greeting her himself. Jonathan swears that he has changed and offers to arrange an internship for Anna at the talent agency managed by his new girlfriend, Margaret Cunningham, but Anna is skeptical of his promises.

At the wedding, Anna meets Ben's friends from high school: Samantha "Sam Sharpe, the witty daughter of Jackson Sharpe who is insecure about her looks; Camilla "Cammie" Sheppard, Ben's devious and sexy ex-girlfriend who wants him back; and Delia "Dee" Young, a spacey but sweet girl who believes in New Age spiritual practices. All three are in love with him and are angry to see Anna as Ben's date. Ben and Anna try to pretend they've been dating at Princeton but her obnoxious seatmate from the plane, who is also in attendance, recognizes them and exposes their secret. The three girls spend the rest of the night cutting down Anna, culminating in Cammie ripping Anna's dress. Sam gets soundly rejected by Ben, and goes to cry in the bathroom where Anna is freshening up. Sam apologizes for mistreating her and invites Anna to attend a Warner Brothers New Year's Eve bash after the wedding as an apology.

At the party, a jealous Cammie attempts to break up Anna and Ben but it backfires and Ben firmly tells her to back off. Cammie leaves the party to visit her mother's grave where she confesses how much she truly loves Ben and he was the only person who ever made her feel safe.

Meanwhile, Sam and a group of partiers go to her father's house for an after-party while Ben and Anna go to his father's boat to have sex. However, Anna admits to Ben that she is not ready to lose her virginity yet. Ben appears to be understanding but after Anna wakes up from a nap, she discovers he is gone.

The next day, Anna joins Sam, Cammie, Dee and their other friends on a charity project but goes home early due to food poisoning. Dee takes Anna home and while caring for her, Dee confesses that she hooked up at Ben when she went to tour Princeton and now she is pregnant with his baby. Anna is shocked and wonders what kind of person Ben truly is.

Anna's internship at Margaret's agency falls through and so she is forced to enroll at Beverly Hills High. Dee and Sam are friendly with her, which makes Cammie feel threatened. Ben shows up at school and begs Anna's forgiveness, but she firmly rejects him. She then leaves to start her classes, impressed with her own newfound confidence.

== Reception ==
Critical reception for The A-List has been mixed. Kirkus Reviews called the book "fast-paced but uninspired", saying that "teens will get the thrill of seeing how the super-rich live, coupled with the heartening insight that money doesn't guarantee happiness". School Library Journal wrote that "Fans of the series will flock to this book, but they may be a tad disappointed with the replay." Publishers Weekly described it as "just the ticket for Gossip Girls[sic] fans" but noted that "the audience may be frustrated by all the loose ends that point strongly to a sequel, if only by way of explanation."

== Film adaptation ==
In 2004, it was announced that Universal Studios acquired the rights to the series, with screenwriters Pam Falk and Mike Ellis attached and Alloy Entertainment to produce but the project never reached further development.
