= The A-List (novel series) =

Series of young adult novels by Zoey Dean

'The A-List'
- The first three books of the series pictured in a boxed set.
- The A-List; Girls on Film; Blonde Ambition; Tall Cool One; Back in Black; Some Like It Hot; American Beauty; Heart of Glass; Beautiful Stranger; California Dreaming
- Author: Zoey Dean
- Language: English
- Publisher: Little, Brown
- Media type: Print
- No. of books: 10

The first three books of the series pictured in a boxed set.

The A-List is a series of young adult novels by Zoey Dean. The series, about a group of rich friends who live in Beverly Hills, has ten books, with the first eponymous novel being released under the Little, Brown imprint Poppy. A spin-off series with new characters titled The A-List: Hollywood Royalty was released in January 2009. Despite commercial success, the series was criticized for being too mature for teen readers, featuring drug usage and sex scenes.

== List of books ==
1. The A-List
2. Girls on Film
3. Blonde Ambition
4. Tall Cool One
5. Back in Black
6. Some Like It Hot
7. American Beauty
8. Heart of Glass
9. Beautiful Stranger
10. California Dreaming

Spin-offs

1. The A-List: Hollywood Royalty
2. The A-List: Sunset Boulevard
3. The A-List: City of Angels

== Plot overview ==
The series follows Anna Percy, an Upper East Side Manhattan private school girl who moves to Los Angeles to live with her father. Anna moves there to reinvent herself and to break free from her preppy Upper East Side life. She often refers to the 'This is How We Do Things Big Book, East Coast WASP Edition', not a real book, but a set of 'rules' that Anna grew up with (e.g. always answer that you're fine). Anna meets Ben Birnbaum on the airplane and instantly falls in love with him.

The other main characters are Samantha 'Sam' Sharpe, Camilla 'Cammie' Sheppard, and Delia 'Dee' Young. Other relevant characters include, but are not limited to, Parker Pinnelli, Adam Flood, Susan Percy, Ben Birnbaum, Eduardo Muñoz, Jackson Sharpe, Poppy Sinclair, and Clark Sheppard.

== Character descriptions ==
Anna Percy - Originally from the Upper East Side in Manhattan, she moves to Los Angeles with her father to finish her senior year and then apply for an internship while hoping to change her boring life. She is serious and intelligent, and frequently refers to the imaginary "This Is How We Do Things Big Book, East Coast WASP Edition" - a set of rules she grew up with in her patrician family. Her parents, Jane Cabot and Jonathan Percy are divorced and she has a somewhat strained relationship with her father that slowly begins to improve. She is a leggy, blonde, patrician beauty, who is often compared to Grace Kelly. She is often referred to as a "tight-ass" by other characters because of her tendency to play things safe and not take risks. Anna is usually very careful with her trust, but knows her way around people. Before moving to L.A., Anna planned to major in English at Yale but quickly found herself to have a talent for screenwriting. Anna is not particularly overwhelmed or impressed by the L.A. lifestyle, nor by the celebrities the characters encounter or talk about throughout the series. She and Sam become fast friends at Beverly Hills High although Anna intensely dislikes Sam's other friends, Dee Young and Cammie Sheppard.

En route to L.A. in the first book, Anna meets the charming Ben Birnbaum on the plane and he invites her to be his date at Jackson Sharpe's wedding. Anna is enthralled by Ben and almost loses her virginity to him but Anna quickly believes Ben is only a player after he inexplicably abandons her after she told him she wanted to take things slow. Anna is still reluctant to trust Ben, especially when she finds about his romantic past, but she eventually forgives him after he explains the misunderstandings between them. Ben and Anna are often on and off throughout the series as Anna tries to decide what she really wants from her life.

Samantha 'Sam' Sharpe - Daughter of Jackson Sharpe, aka "America's Most Beloved Action Star", she is often nicknamed "Sam" or "Sammy". A witty and clever brunette, Sam has many insecurities about her size 10 figure, which is not helped by the fact that all her friends are much tinier than her. Even though Sam's friends try to assure her she is beautiful, Sam never quite really believes it until she meets Eduardo Muñoz, who loves her just as she is. Sam's home life is strained as she craves attention from her ever-absent father and clashes with Poppy Sinclair, her new stepmother who is pregnant with Jackson's baby and only four years older than her. Even though Cammie and Dee are her best friends, Sam does not completely trust them and welcomes Anna to their group because she admires Anna's sophistication, poise, and down-to-earth attitude even though Sam originally had a crush on Ben. She eventually moves on from him and often helps reconcile Ben and Anna throughout the series.

She and Anna become friends after doing a short film together for a school assignment, which led to Sam encouraging Anna to pursue screenwriting. Sam is interested in becoming a filmmaker in her own right and pulls the "Jackson Sharpe's daughter" card to entice people into being her films. Towards the end of the series, Sam is on the lookout for the script to make her feature directing debut with but decides to team up with Anna to make a film loosely based on their senior year instead.

Camilla 'Cammie' Sheppard - Daughter of Clark Sheppard, Los Angeles' uber agent in the film industry, Camilla is always called Cammie. She is described as the most beautiful girl but also the bitchiest with her size 2 figure with impossibly long legs, long strawberry blond curls, bee stung lips, wide set honey colored eyes, perky 34D breasts, and a personality to match. Cammie has very little scruples and goes after what she wants, no matter the consequences. Cammie is Ben's ex-girlfriend and she was hoping to win him back at Jackson Sharpe's wedding and ended up tearing Anna's dress in a fit of jealousy instead.

Cammie claims she got her ruthless attitude from her father but it may be a front to protect herself from getting hurt. Cammie's mother died in a freak boating accident and since then, Cammie made a rule to never wake up away from home lest her father die too. Cammie wishes to be loved as like Sam, her father is rarely home and she clashes with her stepmother Patrice, who makes it no secret that she hates Cammie too. Clark claims that Cammie has no ambition but Cammie surprises everyone when she takes a young model Champagne under her wing and helps Ben open up his own successful night club.

Cammie tries to pursue Ben throughout the series but she falls in love with Adam Flood to her surprise. With Adam, Cammie lets her walls come down and slowly transforms into a slightly more kinder person. She and Anna detest each other but slowly reach peace when they serve community service together although Cammie tells Anna that if she and Ben break up, Cammie will be waiting.

Delia 'Dee' Young - Daughter of a famous music producer Graham Young, she goes by Dee and is described as flaxen haired with big blue eyes and five feet tall with a size zero figure. Dee is very spiritual and is often into the next New Age fad, which often causes her friends to roll their eyes at her. Dee was once in love with Ben and slept with him when they were both drunk on her college tour with Princeton. Afterwards, Dee claimed to be pregnant with Ben's baby but is quickly found out to not be true.

Dee loves to make other people happy and often reaches out to others but often weirds out other characters with her strange ways. Eventually, it is discovered that Dee is hearing voices and she goes to seek treatment at Ojai Mental Health Institute. Once released, Dee is much more clearheaded although her personality is mostly the same.

Ben Birnbaum - Son of Dr. Dan Birnbaum, Hollywood's plastic surgeon to the stars, Ben is an attractive student who studies at Princeton and meets Anna on the plane to L.A. on his way to Jackson Sharpe's wedding. He invites her to be his date, not knowing that his three female friends (Cammie, Sam, and Dee) are all secretly in love with him and hoping to win him over. Anna originally believe Ben to be a player after he ditches her on his father's boat in the middle of the night after she refused to have sex with him, but he explains the reason for his absence: his father has an intense gambling problem and he was ready to commit suicide because he had too many debts.

Anna eventually forgives him and when they first start their relationship, Ben is too controlling and jealous, which causes Anna to break up with him. When he returns to Princeton, they agree to go on a break but eventually get back together at the end of the series. Ben eventually decides to drop out of school to pursue nightclub management and is annoyed when he believes Anna isn't supportive which causes him to end up in Cammie's arms. However, Cammie is surprised that she cares as much about the club as she does about Ben.

Adam Flood - Moved to LA with his parents from Michigan, Adam is an all-around nice guy with morals, unlike most people in LA. He has dark hair and blue star tattoo behind his left ear, which he scratches when he's nervous. He had a crush on Anna, and they briefly dated, but was broken-hearted when she dumped him to get back together with Ben. He begins dating Cammie, and eventually loses his virginity to her. He helps Cammie become a nicer person and helps her solve the mystery surrounding her mother's death.

He and Cammie briefly broke up when he decided to stay in Michigan longer for the summer vacation and was seriously considering attending college there.

== Secondary characters ==
Jane Cabot Percy - Anna Percy's mother. Lives on the Upper East Side in Manhattan and goes by "This Is How We Do Things Big Book, East Coast WASP Edition". Anna has patrician features like her mother. Jane likes collecting art and often has flings with young artists. She is usually in Italy for this and is divorced from Jonathan Percy.

Jonathan Percy - Anna Percy's Father. Lives in Los Angeles, where he grew up, since his divorce form Jane. He has subdural hematoma so he often smokes marijuana for his pain. Anna is surprised to see her father as a relaxed, laid back, and open person as the Jonathan Percy she grew up was an uptight money manager in a six-thousand-dollar hand-tailored suit.

Susan Percy - Anna's sister and formerly a drug and alcohol addict. Susan is similar in appearance to Anna except she bleaches her blonde hair to platinum and favors a more rebellious look. Susan is intelligent and studied at Bowdoin University until she fell in with the wrong crowd. Susan despises her father for paying off her ex-boyfriend into dumping her, in a misguided attempt to get Susan off drugs. Anna helps the two reconcile and Susan returns to rehab, this time at White Mountains in Arizona. When she finishes, she gets a job at the Kripalu institute. In her next appearance in the series, Susan is sober and much happier.

Parker Pinelli - Part of the A-List crew but is secretly poor and hopes to find his big break in acting so he can finally live his life the way he wants. He often hooks up with older, richer women so they will pay his bills and while in Las Vegas, Sam finds out but promises not to tell. Parker is often described as a James Dean look alike and Sam enlists him into seducing her step-mother to discover whether or not she is having an affair. Parker is hesitant as he has just landed a role in Jackson Sharpe's remake of Ben-Hur and worries that Jackson Sharpe will blacklist him if he finds out Parker seduced his wife but it turns out his worries are for nothing as Poppy's adultery is caught by another tabloid magazine.

At the end of the series, Parker is dating Citron Simms and his acting career is beginning to take off, thanks to the Ben-Hur remake.

Jackson Sharpe - America's favourite action star hero and father of Sam Sharpe. In the beginning of the series, he marries Poppy Sinclair, a budding actress, but that ends in divorce after he finds out she's cheating on him. At the end of the series he ends up remarrying his ex-wife, Dina Sharpe. Jackson does love his daughter but due to his demanding career, he rarely gets to show it.

Monty Pinelli - Brother of Parker Pinelli. He doesn't have good looks or anything like that but has connections to the A-List which he uses. Sam usually asks him to help with small films she makes.

Ruby Hummingbird Sinclair-Sharpe - Daughter of Jackson Sharpe and Poppy Sinclair. Sam hates her at first, since throughout Poppy's pregnancy, Sam was often pushed to the side and ignored but then once Poppy leaves, Sam warms up to the baby and promises to be a great older sister. Since the divorce of Jackson and Poppy, the custody of her is shared although Sam hopes to change her name to something more normal.

Dina Sharpe - Sam Sharpe's mother. She was married to Jackson she divorced him as she was unhappy with life in Hollywood. She rarely contacted Sam throughout the years, which causes Sam to resent her. Sam reluctantly agrees to contact her as she helps Cammie solve the mystery around mother's death, as Dina was close with Cammie's mother, Jeanne.

Dina eventually remarries Jackson and Sam is pleased to have her family back together.

Clark Sheppard - Cammie Sheppard's father and one of the best agents in the business. He is also feared by some people and works for Apex with Margaret Cunningham. He is remarried to Patrice, a former star whose career he helped resurrect, and has a stepdaughter, Mia. He is blunt, ruthless, and cold-hearted. He is not afraid to punish Cammie when she intentionally sabotages his show "Hermosa Beach" in an attempt to make Anna look bad, by canceling her credit cards and taking away her car.

As Cammie shows more ambition and direction, Clark is pleasantly surprised and teaches his daughter how to be a successful businesswoman and agent.

Jeanne Sheppard - Cammie's mother, who is deceased before the beginning of the series. Jeanne was a friendly schoolteacher whom Cammie adored. The two shared a passion for E.B. White and were even painting a mural of the characters from Charlotte's Web on Cammie's bedroom wall but when Jeanne died in a freak accident, Cammie couldn't bring herself to finish it. When the Sheppards moved, Cammie insisted the wall be installed in her new room as well.

It is revealed towards the end of the series that Jeanne was suffering from clinical depression and committed suicide. She left Cammie a touching note to be read on her wedding day that inspired Cammie to become a kinder person.

Jack Walker - Best friend of Ben Birnbaum and also goes to Princeton with him. He was Dee's blind date to the senior prom and then ends up falling in love with her. He wants to create his own reality TV show because his little sister, Margie, loves them.

Danny Bluestone - Danny is the co-producer on Hermosa Beach. He and Anna got along really well while she was working on her internship with Clark Sheppard at Hermosa Beach. They shared a few kisses but only stay friends.

Caine Manning - Intern of Jonathan Percy and dates Anna for a while. Has tattoos of Botticelli on his arms and moonlights at a club. He breaks up with Anna after Benadette, his ex-girlfriend, wants to get back together.

Poppy Sinclair - Former wife of Jackson Sharpe and the mother of his second child, Ruby Hummingbird Sinclair-Sharpe. The two met onset of filming Jackson Sharpe's latest movie and had a torrid affair, not unlike the other flings Jackson had before on the set of his previous films, but when Poppy became pregnant, Jackson happily married her. She is gorgeous with long legs and hair but is described by Sam as nothing more than a bimbo. She splits from Jackson after he finds out she was having an affair with her Yoga teacher, Bodhi, and leaves Ruby Hummingbird behind.

Cynthia "Cyn" Baltres - Anna Percy's best friend from New York, a more rebellious and wild child, the two have an unlikely friendship. She goes out with Scott Spencer, Anna's former crush, but then breaks up with him after the relationship becomes boring and confronts Anna for never saying anything while Cyn pursued him. Cyn encourages Anna to be more outspoken and go after what she wants.

The two reunite when Anna visits New York and Cyn tells Anna that they will always be friends.

Scott Spencer - Anna's former crush and ex-boyfriend of Cynthia Baltres. Anna was attracted to Scott's intelligence and good looks but when he and Cyn join Anna and her L.A. friends on their trip to Las Vegas, Anna realizes she only loved the idea of him but is nonetheless embarrassed when she admitted her crush in front of everyone while she was hypnotized. Cyn also breaks up with him because their relationship was becoming stale.

When Anna visits New York, she sees him in a relationship with a pretentious playwright named Tabitha whom she and Cyn dislike.

Logan Creswell - Anna's lifelong friend. The two attended the same Upper East Side prep schools until Logan left to attend boarding school. The two reunite when Anna visits New York with Sam and Anna is relieved that he is as unsure as she is about college. He decides not to go to school and instead go into the family business of hotel management. He visits Anna in L.A. and invites her to Bali with him to check out his family's hotel. After some reluctance, Anna agrees but when their plan has engine trouble and has to return to L.A., Anna realizes she does not want to be with Logan so he takes the next flight to Bali by himself.

Django Simms - Jonathan Percy's assistant and chauffeur. Known as a man of mystery who plays the piano extremely well with a taste for jazz. He lives in the guesthouse at Jonathan's house and comes from Louisiana. He and Anna are on good terms.

Citron Simms - Sister of Django Simms and aspires to make it in L.A. as a jazz singer. She lives in the guesthouse with her brother Django. She starts working as a waitress at the Beverly Hills Hotel and meets Parker and Sam there. She starts dating Parker near the end of the series.

Graham Young - Dee's dad and a famous music producer

Cici Young - Dee's mother and shares similar traits to Dee.

Stefanie Weinstock - The A-List crew's enemy. Sam, Cammie and Dee took her under their wing but once Stephanie transferred to the rival school Pacific Palisades, she made it her mission to try to make her former friends look bad. She throws a joint BHH and Pacific Palisades school graduation party, and deliberately ruined Anna and Ben's relationship by inviting Blythe, Ben's ex from Princeton, to cause drama.

Pashima Nusbaum - Best friend of Stephanie Weinstock and co-host of the joint BHH and Pacific Palisades graduation party. Thrives on her bitchy attitude and her ability to make people feel worthless. Both her and Stephanie are hated by Cammie, Sam, and Dee.

Blythe - A student at Princeton who was "hanging out" with Ben while he and Anna were on a break from their relationship. Blythe was unintentionally led on by Ben and the two had sex. Blythe, however, is a good sport and agrees to stop pursuing Ben after she finds out he wants to get serious with Anna. However, Anna did not know the exact details of their relationship until the joint BHH and Pacific Palisades graduation party and breaks up with Ben for lying to her.

Madeleine McGee - A family friend of the Birnbaum family. She used to weigh over 300 pounds but after getting her stomach stapled, she now has a new curvy figure. She was severely bullied at school for her weight and moved from Michigan to attend Pacific Palisades school and is a junior there. Anna worries that Maddy has a crush on Ben but then finds out that she actually has a crush on one of her teachers.

No longer threatened, Sam, Cammie, Anna and Dee help Maddy get ready for prom by giving her a full makeover.
