= Marya Hornbacher =

American journalist and author

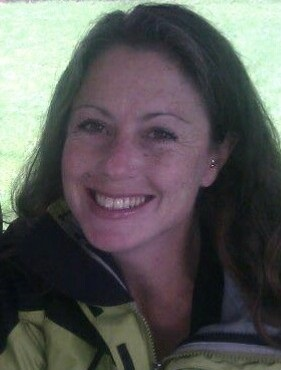
- Marya Hornbacher in 2013
- Born: 4 April 1974 (age 52); Walnut Creek, California, U.S.
- Spouse(s): Julian Beard (1996–1998); Jeff Miller (2002–2010)
- Website: www.maryahornbacher.com

Marya Justine Hornbacher (born April 4, 1974) is an American author and freelance journalist.

Her book Wasted: A Memoir of Anorexia and Bulimia is an autobiographical account of her struggle with eating disorders, written when she was twenty-three. This is the book which originally brought attention to Hornbacher. It has been translated into sixteen languages and sold over a million copies in the U.S.

== Bibliography ==
Her first book was Wasted: A Memoir of Anorexia and Bulimia. This book was updated in May 2014, 15 years after the original date of publication, with a postscript by Hornbacher. "Hornbacher, an authority in the field of eating disorders, argues that recovery is not only possible, it is necessary. But the journey is not easy or guaranteed. With a new ending to her story that adds a contemporary edge, Wasted continues to be timely and relevant."

Her second book is the critically acclaimed 2005 novel, The Center of Winter, which follows a family in the aftermath of a suicide.

Her third book, published in April 2008, is a memoir titled Madness: A Bipolar Life, which chronicles her bipolar disorder diagnosis.

Her fourth book, published in 2010, is the recovery handbook Sane: Mental Illness, Addiction, and the Twelve Steps written as a guide to working the Twelve Steps for people who have both addiction and mental illness.

Her fifth book, published in 2011, Waiting: A Nonbeliever's Higher Power, explores spirituality and what that can mean to someone recovering - from addiction, mental illness, or both - who does not believe in God.

In an interview in August 2015 conducted by Adam Walhberg of Minnpost, Hornbacher revealed the inspiration behind the new book she was working on. She spoke about "the new edition of DSM-5 (Diagnostic and Statistical Manual of Mental Disorders) [which] was released and it created... an... uproar in psychiatry and brain science." In this book, she planned to write profiles of 12 people with mental illness to explore these philosophical issues on a more human level. We've Been Healing All Along was published in 2022. As part of the research for this book, she interviewed approximately 1,500 people.

She has also edited several books.

== Biography ==
Hornbacher was born in Walnut Creek, California, and raised in Edina, Minnesota. She is the only child of Jay and Judy Hornbacher, professional theatre actors and directors. When Hornbacher was fourteen years old, she was accepted into the arts boarding school Interlochen in northwest Michigan. She later enrolled in the University of Minnesota and started writing for the university's student newspaper The Minnesota Daily. In the fall of 1992, she entered college at American University in Washington, D.C. She eventually obtained her degree in philosophy and poetics from the New College of California.

== Personal life ==
Hornbacher married Julian Daniel Beard in 1996. They divorced after the success of Wasted. The marriage, and eventual divorce, is also discussed in Madness where she attributes the nuptial failure in part to problems with drugs and alcohol, and largely to her ill-managed bipolar disorder. Hornbacher then married Jeff Miller.

She has been sober since 2001. She was honored with a major award, the ASCAP Award for music journalism, for her profile of jazz great Oscar Peterson (published January 2005). She is also a two-time fellow at Yale. She has also been awarded the Annie Dillard Award for Nonfiction, the Logan Fellowship for social justice journalism and the Fountain House Humanitarian Award.

As of 2014, Hornbacher was working on several projects. She is currently working on a nonfiction book about sex and sexuality in literature. She is also completing a manuscript of poetry and a manuscript of essays and has a novel in the works. Along with her journalism and articles, she teaches in the graduate writing program at Northwestern University in Evanston, Illinois. She still publishes occasional journalistic pieces, as well as short fiction and poetry.
