= Young adult romance literature =

Genre of fiction

Young adult romance literature is a genre of books written for teenagers. As defined by Romance Writers of America, a romance novel consists of a central love story and an emotionally satisfying ending. Early young adult romances feature a teenage protagonist, who is typically female, white, and middle-class, while books in the twenty-first century include a wider variety of protagonists.

Young adult romances were very popular in the 1950s and early 1960s, but were supplanted by more realistic young adult novels in the late 1960s and 1970s. Romances became popular again in the 1980s, although the trend at that time was toward series by publisher brand rather than individual authors. Subgenres for young adults, such as paranormal romance, evangelical romance, and dystopian romance, became popular in the twenty-first century. Parents and educators often criticized the reading of romances, but at their best, young adult romance novels celebrate relationships.

== 1950s and 1960s ==
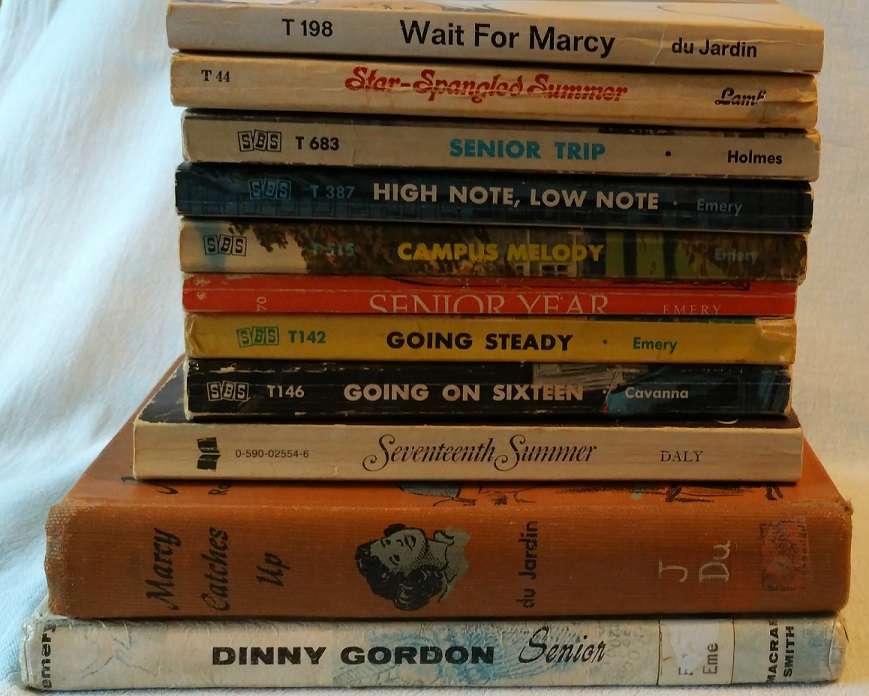
Selection of popular YA romance novels

The success of Seventeenth Summer by Maureen Daly, published in 1942, is generally acknowledged as the impetus for romance novels specifically written for teenage girls, although Daly considered her novel to be written for adults. Young adult romance novels were referred to as junior novels and sometimes malt shop novels. Popular authors were Anne Emery, Rosamond du Jardin, Betty Cavanna, Janet Lambert, Lenora Mattingly Weber, and Mary Stolz.

The teen romance novels of this era focused on family and domesticity. Usually set in small towns, girls from traditional, middle-class families worried about being popular and getting dates. Gender roles were conventional, and it was presumed that girls would grow up to become wives and mothers. Physical intimacy in these books seldom progressed beyond kisses. Despite a growing national concern with juvenile delinquency, it was not an element in junior novels. These novels explicitly warned readers against "bad boys", while emphasizing the importance of heterosexual romance and chaste behavior on dates.

The girls in these books cared about being considered pretty, although the focus was primarily on facial beauty rather than the attractiveness of the body. Boys expected loyalty and fidelity from the girls, and in exchange, they cherished and protected the girls. Romance was presented as the natural relation between boys and girls. Donelson describes the formula:

By the 1950s, certain taboos had been clearly established for the adolescent novels—no early or forced marriages; no pregnancy outside marriage; no drugs, alcohol, or smoking; no profane or obscene language; no deaths; almost no ethnic references; no school dropouts unless as object lessons; no divorce; no sense of the ambivalent cruelty and compassion of young people; no alienation of young people from society or family; no sexuality or sensuality.

More realistic problem novels in the late 1960s supplanted young adult romances in popularity.

== 1980s and 1990s ==
There was a resurgence of young adult romances in the 1980s with category romances for teens, with the category or line being more important than the name of the individual author. Multiple new teen romance lines began in the 1980s, such as Scholastic Books' Wildfire series, Bantam Books Sweet Dreams, Silhouette (an imprint of Harlequin) First Love, and Sweet Valley High, with some speculation that the teen romance resurgence was related to a growing wave of conservatism on the heels of the presidency of Ronald Reagan. The Journal of Reading observed, "Girls are buying and reading with a passion not seen since the 1950s and 1960s, when romances were last popular."

Publishers were interested in original books that could be published directly in paperback format, rather than being released in hardback first. The teen romance phenomenon "signaled the emergence of a new marketplace—the chain bookstore—and the emergence of a new type of book: the paperback original."

Unlike the earlier wave of "junior novels" which were primarily written by popular individual authors, the new teen romances were titles published under a series name and logo. Publishers actively marketed their teen romances. The Silhouette First Love line had a $1.4 million advertising campaign. The Sweet Dreams series (1981–1995) was the longest running single title romance series of the 1980s. Sweet Valley High was the most popular series. Scholastic's Wildfire sold 1.8 million copies of 16 titles in one year. The first young adult novel to reach the New York Times paperback best-seller list was Sweet Valley High Perfect Summer in 1985. More than 34 million Sweet Valley High books were in print by 1990.

Both malt shop novels from the 1950s and series romances in the 1980s pushed the message that conformity was the path to popularity. Teen romances were not solely about romance, however; protagonists were teenage girls learning to balance the demands of school, family, friendships, and boyfriends. Early books, like the junior novels, had little sex, although that gradually changed over the years. The romance series for teens in the 1980s was modeled on adult romances with "more innocent" storylines. These books were generally told from the point-of-view of a 15–16-year-old girl experiencing her first love. The category romances included coming-of-age and finding-oneself plot elements. Like the junior novels from the 1950s, romance was positioned as the key to the heroine's development, and she is transformed by romantic success. The emphasis on beautifying one's self now included concerns about body type and weight.

Publishers and education professionals variously attributed the popularity of the category romances to escapism, conservatism, reaction to the "problem novel", wish fulfillment, and love-without-sex being less threatening. Authors attributed it to the books making teens feel good and being about things that could happen to them.

In September 1981, a coalition of the Council on Interracial Books for Children, American Federation of Teachers, Coalition of Labor Union Women, the Disabled in Action of Metropolitan New York, and the Women's Action Alliance Non-Sexist Child Development Project, issued a statement condemning teen romances; specifically, because:

Teen romances 1) teach girls that their primary value is their attractiveness to boys, 2) devalue relationships and encourage competition between girls, 3) discount the possibility of nonromantic friendships between boys and girls, 4) depict middleclass, White, small town families as the norm, and 5) portray adults in stereotypic sex roles.

In contrast, a survey of librarians by Publishers Weekly found that they approved of teen romances that "portray working mothers, single-parent households, and girls with hobbies and career aspirations", and that they encourage teenagers to read (although they did decry the "formula" approach).

The category romances were supplanted in popularity by chick lit such as Gossip Girl and The A-List, which some classify as romance, and young adult horror such as the Fear Street series.

== 2000s ==
The early 21st century saw a resurgence of individual authors. Notable authors include Stephenie Meyer, Sarah Dessen, Meg Cabot, Louise Rennison, Anna Godbersen, Melissa de la Cruz, Cecily von Ziegesar, Simone Elkeles, Lurlene McDaniel, Ann Brashares, Kate Brian, Zoey Dean, Annette Curtis Klause, and Megan McCafferty.

Young adult romance novels in the 21st century have a greater variety of protagonist than the earlier novels. A popular Harlequin Teen series was Kimani Tru, written by black authors (male and female). The first book, Indigo Summer, published in 2007, was on the Essence bestsellers list. The wider array of characters, settings, and plots has resulted in a number of sub-genres within the young adult romance category.

=== Evangelical ===
Evangelical books are those that are published by Christian presses, sold at Christian bookstores, and written for a Christian audience. Young adult evangelical romance series include Cedar River day dreams (Bethany House), Class of 2000 (Harvest House), The Christy Miller series (Focus on the Family), and Pacific Cascades University (Palisades).

In these books, more of the conflicts are based on family issues than in secular romances. Generally, nontraditional families are given a negative portrayal with a stable traditional family structure being shown as essential to a character's well-being. The "boyfriend plot" is less prominent than in secular romances. The girls in the books are less dependent on boys, and greater emphasis is given to the girl's relationship with God and family than a romantic partner.

=== LGBTQ ===
This subgenre consists of teen romance novels that contain LGBTQ (lesbian, gay, bisexual, transgender, queer/questioning) themes or characters.

Examples

- Something Like Gravity, Amber Smith
- The Geek's Guide to Unrequited Love, Sarvenaz Tash
- Boy Meets Boy, David Levithan
- What If It's Us?, Becky Albertalli, Adam Silvera

=== Paranormal and dystopian ===
This subgenre consists of teen romance novels that contain settings and themes from science fiction, fantasy, or horror. After the success of Twilight, Barnes & Noble set up stand-alone sections for paranormal romance.

Paranormal romances tend to place a great emphasis on virginity and equate it with morality and goodness. The heroine seems ordinary to herself, but is revealed by the hero to be extraordinary. The romance is fated by destiny, and resisting temptation leads to eternal love.

Examples

- Intertwined series, Gena Showalter
- Wings series, Aprilynne Pike
- The Wolves of Mercy Falls series, Maggie Stiefvater
- Noughts and Crosses series, Malorie Blackman
- Twilight series, Stephenie Meyer
- Hush, Hush series by Becca Fitzpatrick
- Mara Dyer series by Michelle Hodkin

=== Realistic ===
The subgenre of realistic romance consists of teen romance novels that include elements of the problem novel.

Examples

- Annie on My Mind, Nancy Garden
- Eleanor & Park, Rainbow Rowell
- Finding My Voice, Marie Myung-Ok Lee
- Anatomy of a Boyfriend, Daria Snadowsky
- The Infinite Moment of Us, Lauren Myracle
- Dairy Queen, Catherine Gilbert Murdock
