= Going steady =

Exclusive romance

Going steady is when two romantic partners agree to an exclusive relationship. Growing in prevalence in the United States after World War II, this pattern became mainstream in high schools and colleges in the 1950s. Its popularity continued through the 1980s, with teenagers beginning to go steady at progressively earlier ages. However, the label "going steady" fell into disuse in the 1970s.

== Definitions ==
A survey of college students in 1955 found a distinction between "going steadily" with someone, which indicated dating the same person repeatedly, and "going steady" which indicated a formalized or explicit agreement. Going steady often involved an exchange of clothing or jewelry which would be worn to announce the state of the relationship. Couples might exchange identification bracelets or "friendship rings". The custom of a college man giving a woman his fraternity pin led to the colloquial term of "getting pinned", meaning "engaged to be engaged".

Sociologists include group recognition of the couple's status as part of the definition of going steady.

According to A Girl's Guide to Dating and Going Steady (1968), a couple are going steady when they were "seeing each other exclusively one or more times a week for a fairly long period of time." Another researcher defined it as "the stage when both partners come to a mutual implicit understanding that dating will exclude others."

== From playing the field to going steady ==
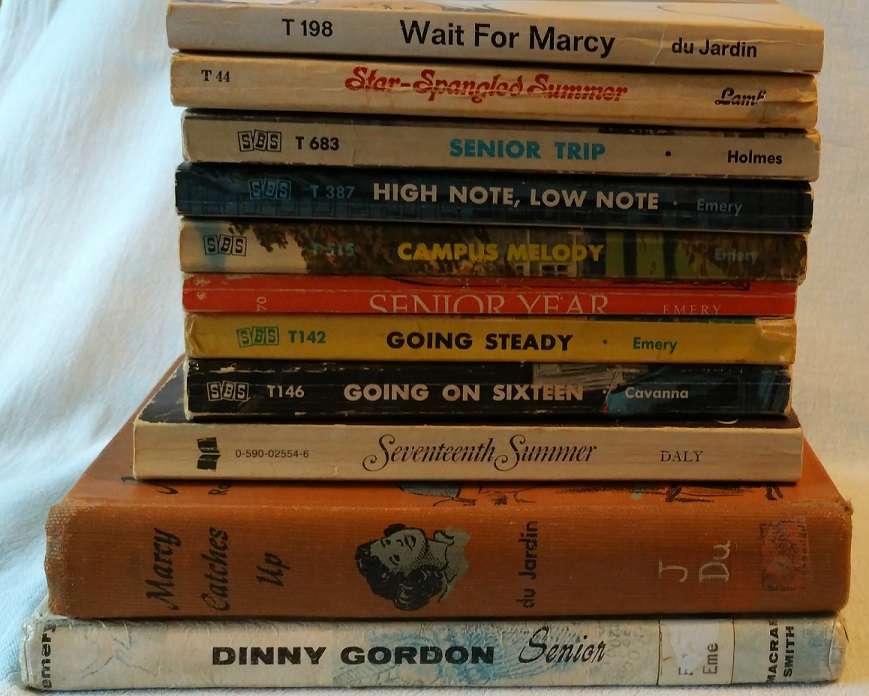
Going steady was a theme in adolescent and young-adult novels of the 1950s and 1960s.

Before World War II, high school and college students generally dated multiple people, colloquially called "playing the field". Dating patterns involved variety and competition, and multiple partners were a signal of popularity. Sociologists characterize this form of dating as "competitive". In 1937, sociologist Willard Waller, based on a study at Penn State College, described it as a "Rating and Dating Complex" in which males and females were rated in popularity by themselves and their peers on characteristics such as having money and good clothes, belonging to the best sorority or fraternity, and dating the "right" people, although later researchers question whether Waller's observations reflected as widespread a pattern as he implied and note that some individuals chose to pair off exclusively before it became the style.

Steady dating began to supplant casual dating in the 1940s. During the war, there was a rapid move away from "competitive" dating (having the most and best dating partners) and toward committed relationships (going steady). There is speculation that the emphasis on early marriage during and after WWII was linked to the impulse to go steady. Some historians credit the shortage of male partners during the war; however, the end of the war did not end the practice, and going steady became even more pervasive after the war ended. Going steady was a frequent theme in popular teen novels of the time. High school students were expected to enter committed heterosexual relationships or become socially marginalized. Sociologist Wini Breines characterizes it as "a routinized sexual system that controlled and punished female spontaneity and ensured that young women followed the prescribed steps to marriage".

A study in the 1950s found that three-fourths of the girls and more than half of the boys in grades 11 and 12 had gone steady, many for a year or longer. A 1959 Ladies' Home Journal article was titled "If You Don't Go Steady, You're Different". A study in the 1980s of high school in Connecticut found 81% of girls and almost 70% of boys had gone steady. Daly, in the 1951 Profiles of Youth, quotes a high school principal: "In this school, a girl either goes steady or she doesn't date at all. And after two or three dates with one boy, she's considered going steady whether she wants to or not."

== Peer opinions ==
The trend toward having a single, exclusive romantic partner was accompanied by growing disapproval among peers of those who dated multiple partners. Sexual experimenting outside of the steady relationship had the consequence of being labelled promiscuous.

While a small study in 1940 and 1941 found some peer disapproval of going steady, by 1960 it was widely accepted and only a small minority of peers disapproved. Contemporary studies found that going steady was viewed as a stage toward marriage by some participants, while to others it was a common social behavior with no goal of marriage. The seriousness of intent when going steady often differed between classes: students with plans to attend college took a high school steady relationship less seriously than working class students who would be more likely to view it as a relationship that might progress to marriage.

Going steady was recognized and sanctioned by peer groups, and provided a form of status similar to being engaged. Friends and acquaintances recognized the relationship and had expectations of acceptable behavior when going steady. For example, when one cannot attend an event, the other is expected to be absent as well. Other boys should not ask the girl out, and the girl should not date or flirt with other boys.

== Adult opinions ==
The trend of going steady was met with concern and disapproval by adults. A 1951 book, Profiles of Youth, called going steady "a national problem", and said teens' greatest concern was "whether to go steady". Some parochial schools forbid the practice after Catholic leaders declared "going steady is a proximate occasion of sin". Advice columnist Dorothy Dix wrote, "The custom has all of the worst features of marriage and none of its advantages." Another syndicated columnist, Doris Blake wrote "It's simply a pernicious habit grown out of we-don't-know-what that has fostered this ridiculous custom of a couple of 16, 17, or 18 year olds pairing off to the exclusion of everyone else on the dance floor." Life magazine featured an article on the subject, noting that 65% of students in some high schools were going steady, and a column in Boys' Life discussed the issue.

The primary concern with going steady was the perception that it would lead to greater intimacy and sexual experimentation than casual dating. According to Breines, "Although the social scientific surveys indicate little evidence of a dramatic increase in sexual intercourse among teenagers in the postwar period, adults believed there was such an increase." Both white teens and girls of color tended to limit their sexual activity to steady relationships. Reliable data on teen sexual behavior pre- and post-war is sparse, and historians argue whether the rate of premarital intercourse rose gradually or sharply through the 1960s. Rates of premarital pregnancy and data about venereal disease in teens over the years suggest that increasing numbers of teenagers were engaging in sexual intercourse. A study in the 1990s found that there was a greater association between early sexual activity and going steady than with frequent casual dating. A 2004 study also found that the majority of adolescents first have sex when going steady. Studies conflict on whether going steady had more association with use of birth control or less. Littauer states "Being in love and going steady was more significant to a young woman's decision to have sex than was class, education, religion, or any other factor."

A secondary concern was that going steady would inhibit teens' social development. Experts warned that going steady would limit one to inadequate experience getting to know different people and could result in bad choices. A YWCA publication said a steady relationship would "reduce your opportunities for knowing other congenial people whom you might enjoy." Although some experts criticize going steady as limiting a person's exposure to potential partners, "playing the field" results in only superficial exposure to those potential partners. According to Herman, "quantity and variety of experience is not necessarily a good substitute for quality, in the sense that going steady may allow more thorough and penetrating learning processes to occur."

By the late 1960s, the sexual revolution of the counterculture was the new fear of adults, and going steady had become more accepted.

== Reasons for going steady and breaking up ==
Some self-reported motivations for going steady include:

- For acceptance and to fit in with their peer groups
- For security
- To avoid the discomfort of competing for dates

Reasons for ending the steady relationship include:

- Getting too serious
- Not enough in common
- They find the lack of freedom restricting
- They want someone else or someone different

== Trends ==
Surveys of college women, repeated in ten-year intervals from 1958 to 1978, found an increase in both the numbers who had gone steady, earlier ages for going steady, and a large decrease in number of dating partners, as shown in the following table:

Year	Had gone steady	Age first went steady	Mean number of partners ever dated
1958	68%	17.0	53
1968	77%	16.7	25
1978	85%	15.9	14

== See also ==
- History of courtship in the United States
- Hookup culture
