= Necessary Roughness =

Necessary Roughness may refer to:

- Necessary Roughness (film) (1991), a sports comedy film directed by Stan Dragoti
- Necessary Roughness (book) (1996), by author Marie G. Lee
- Necessary Roughness (album) (1997), released by The Lady of Rage
- Necessary Roughness (TV series) (2011), a USA Network show starring Callie Thorne

== See also ==
- Unnecessary roughness, a penalty in gridiron football
- Unnecessary Roughness '95 an American football video game
