= History of courtship in the United States =

Courtship practices in the United States changed gradually throughout its history. The transition from primarily rural colonies to cities and the expansion across the continent with major waves of immigration, accompanied by developments in transportation, communication, education, industrialization, and the economy, contributed to changes over time in the national culture that influenced how young people met, interacted, and married.

Courtship is generally considered to be the process of people meeting and marrying. (Note: In 1957, E. E. Lemasters, professor of social work at the University of Wisconsin–Madison, defined courtship as "the process by which the individual moves from the single status of the adolescent to the married status of the adult." Sociologist Andrew Cherlin defined courtship as "a process where parents and others kept watch while young people found a spouse." According to sociologist Barbara Dafoe Whitehead: "Romantic courtship is a process of mate selection closely connected to marriage. As it has been elaborated and codified in social practice over the ages, it is organized as a linear progression, or ladder, toward marital commitment.") Marriage and the formation of families was of critical importance to the success of the colonies. Each colony was influenced by the customs of the founding group, reflecting the cultural and religious expectations of the society that provided the colonists. Parents generally had an active role in their children's courtships, as did the surrounding community to a lesser extent. The concept of romantic love gradually evolved from a minor consideration to a major deciding factor in marriage.

With the advent of dating in the late 19th and early 20th centuries, families had less control over the courting process. Competitive dating in the 1930s and 1940s rapidly transitioned into the serial monogamy of going steady in the 1950s. The societal upheaval of the 1960s erased most old courtship traditions and scripts, but failed to replace them with any new mores. By the 21st century, although people still meet, pair off, and sometimes marry, there is an absence of widely accepted social norms with which to comply.

== Colonial times ==
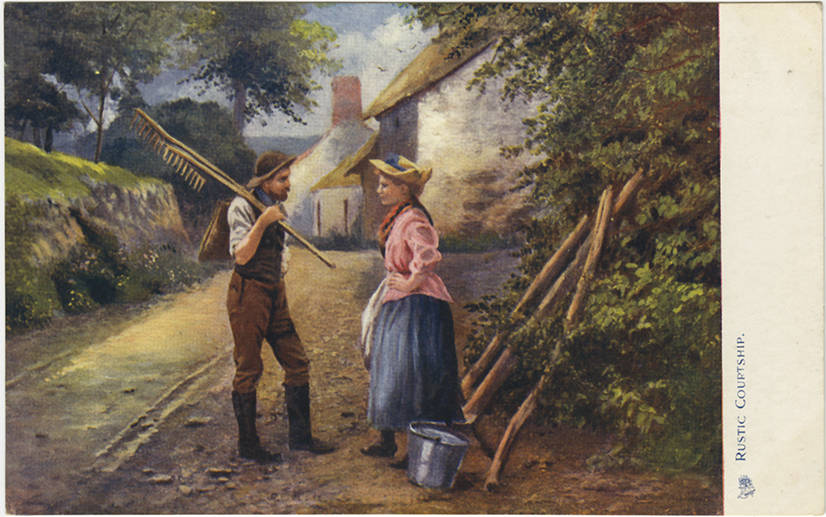
Men and women found opportunities in daily life to socialize.

In the early days of the colonies, parents played a decisive role in choosing their offspring's partner, as it was considered a critical decision with both financial and social consequences for the individuals and the community. Wealth, social position, and love were considered to be the primary objectives of marriage, with wealth and social position taking precedence. Romantic love was considered an immature basis for marriage. In the 17th century, most colonies' laws required consent of parents to marriage, with some, such as New Haven and Plymouth Colony, requiring a young man to obtain a woman's father's consent even to pay court to her. Enforcement of such laws fell into disuse by the 18th century as the practice of young people choosing their own mates became commonly accepted.

Young people's courting would take place in conjunction with ordinary daily activities, such as accompanying each other to church or performing chores. Opportunities for privacy, such as gathering berries and tending far-away fields, were welcomed by the couples. Despite the watchful eyes of the families and communities, it was not uncommon for courting couples to engage in premarital sex and many colonial brides were pregnant on their wedding day. By the end of the 18th century, nearly one-third of brides in New England were pregnant before the wedding.

The customs for courtship in the early colonies varied according to the religious and cultural framework of each colony. In the Chesapeake Colonies, marriages were often arranged by families, while in Delaware Colony, Quakers forbid any marriage to a non-Quaker or to a first or second cousin, and the entire community had to consent to any marriage. The custom of the Moravians in New York and Pennsylvania was for church elders to pair off couples, although the members of the couples could veto the pairing.

In the Puritan colonies of New England, marriage required the consent of both parents and children. Law and custom governed courtship. Marriage in New England was considered a civil contract, rather than a sacrament. A potential suitor would approach a young woman's parents, often with a small gift, and seek their consent. With the parents' approval, the courting couple were given sufficient privacy to determine if they were compatible. One custom, brought to New England from Europe, was bundling, the practice of wrapping a couple together in a bed with a board between the two of them. (Note: Bundling fell into disuse around 1800.)

When the courting couple agreed to marry, banns of marriage were published and they were considered to be betrothed. Breaking a betrothal damaged the reputations of both individuals, although more often the woman's character incurred the greatest harm. In Quaker communities, a man and woman declared their intent to marry at the meetinghouse assembly. A Men's Meeting committee would investigate the prospective groom and a Women's Meeting committee investigated the prospective bride. As the couple had to announce their intent twice before the monthly meeting in consecutive months, their formal engagements lasted at least two months.

There was an imbalance in numbers of women and men in the early colony of Georgia, so courtships were often quite brief and men often married young girls. As in other colonies, parental permission was usually required before betrothal, although colonists from the Rhineland brought with them the custom that those of "a certain age" could decide to marry without their parents' consent. Later in the 18th century, as greater numbers of settlers moved to Georgia, courtships lasted longer and less often involved girls younger than 16.

As the colonies matured, upper-class families might travel or send unmarried daughters to visit in other cities to widen their exposure to potential mates of the proper class. This was particularly the case in the south, where families on rural plantations were more isolated. Mothers would take their daughters to cities such as Savannah, Williamsburg, and Charleston for a social season of teas, balls, and formal dinners. Courtship among the elite families relied heavily on parental consent and was informally governed by strict protocol. Young women felt pressured to find a mate, as those unmarried by age 20 were often considered "old maids".

Many immigrants during the 18th century were indentured servants and were constrained from marrying while serving their indenture. A man could purchase his prospective wife's freedom so that they could marry, although it was not unknown for a man to court and seduce a young woman with the promise of buying out her indenture.

In the years around the American Revolution, respected figures in early American society, such as Benjamin Franklin, Thomas Paine, and John Witherspoon, wrote tracts on courtship, marriage, and choosing a good partner. Witherspoon went so far as to place the dominant responsibility for ill-suited matches on men, as men had the freedom to choose while women could only assent or deny when asked. Franklin and Paine decried the practice of marrying for wealth rather than mutual affection. Benjamin Rush and Enos Hitchcock (Note: Hitchcock was a chaplain in the Continental Army.) called for more practical education for women to better prepare them as partners in the joint management of family in a new society. Periodicals and magazines ran frequent stories encouraging marriage and making fun of bachelors and spinsters.

In the years after American independence, young people enjoyed considerable autonomy in their social activities, with little oversight of courtships. Greater numbers of young people lacked nearby families, whether by being orphaned, having moved away from their homes, or immigrating on their own, leading to an absence of the familial and social ties that would restrict their activities. The idea that the fundamental reason for marriage should be love and that partners should select each other on the basis of love grew in popular acceptance. Courtships could last several years while the young man worked toward a state of financial stability to support a family.

By 1800, young people generally selected their own partners. The perception of marriage as a joining of two people in emotional intimacy meant that only the two people involved could judge each other's suitability for partnership; parents and families had little control over the matter. Young men continued to seek permission from parents to marry their daughter, though more as a formality or ritual.

== 19th century ==
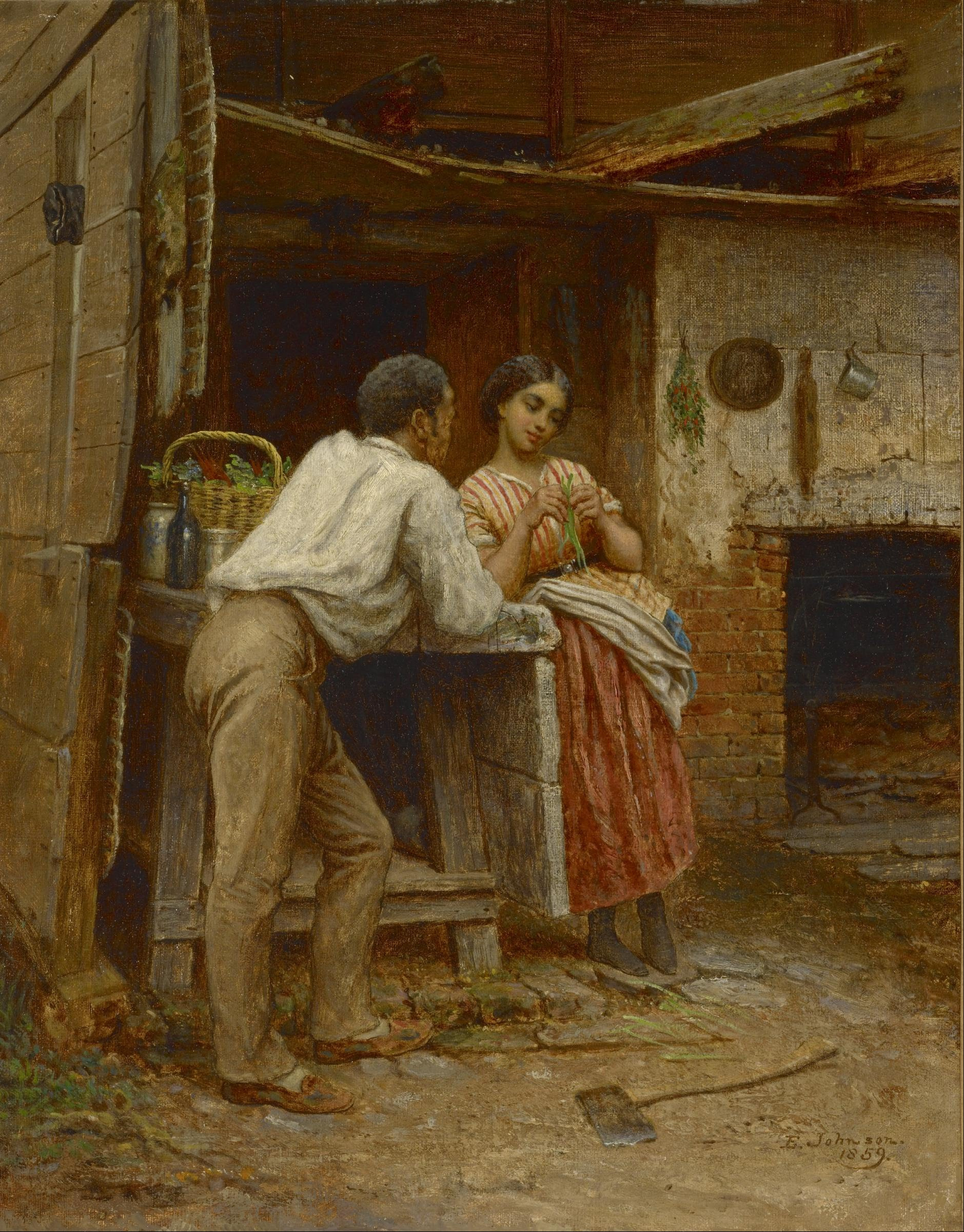
Southern Courtship by Eastman Johnson

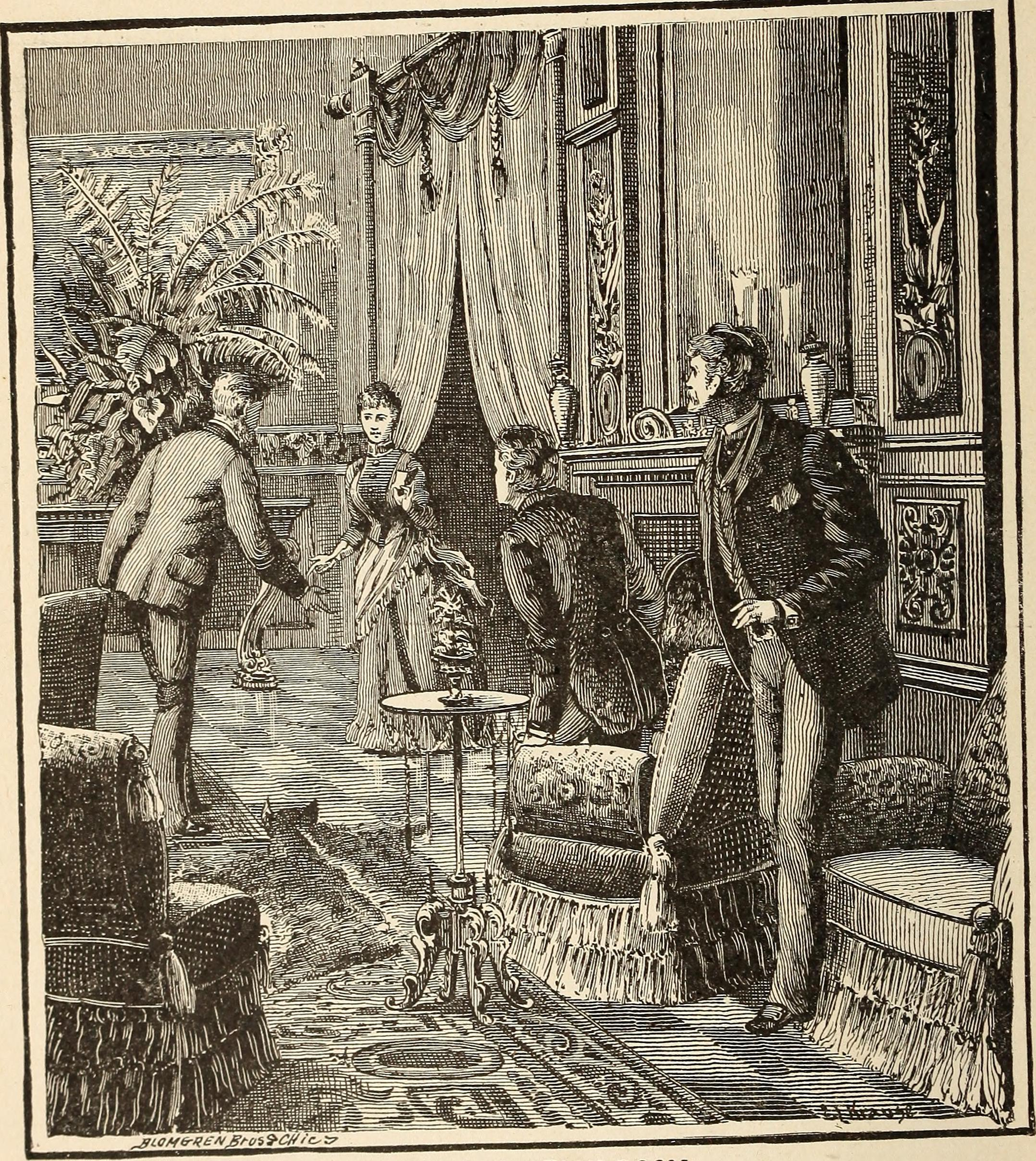
Gentlemen callers at the house of a young woman.

In the 19th century, courting was the term for socializing between unmarried men and women. When the socializing between a man and woman included an explicit intent to eventually marry, it was called courtship. Men and women met through families and friends, in church, and at school. Courting often began in the teenage years with group activities such as picnics, riding, parties, and dances.

=== Romance ===
By mid-century, the ideal of romantic love was firmly established in middle-class America, becoming even more meaningful than religion. With heightened expectations of happiness and fulfillment from marriage and the strict disapproval of divorce, courtship was a high-stakes pursuit of the right partner. This frequently played out in the form of obstacles, expressed doubts, and emotional crises to "test" the prospective partner. The deliberately created dramas were intended to strengthen the emotional bond between the pair and to reassure each one of the other's devotion. One gentleman expressed his view of the testing:

If I had succeeded with you at the outset and been spared all the trouble and suffering which I underwent in my pursuit of you, I fear that I would not have appreciated the great value of my conquest and might have proved a less grateful and self-sacrificing husband than I intend to show myself.

=== Love letters ===
In Victorian America, strict observance of social codes was adhered to in public, but private life was expected to be free of constraint. Thus, the frequent exchange of love letters was a widespread courtship activity, particularly among the upper- and middle-class and even when the couple were only separated by being in different residences. Etiquette manuals, magazines, and book-length guides provided advice and sample letters while at the same time insisting that the writer should write naturally and sincerely. Reading and writing love letters was seen as an extremely intimate experience, akin to being in their loved one's presence. Written correspondence as a major element of a courtship was greatly diminished by the last part of the 19th century.

=== Sex ===
Courting couples were expected to refrain from premarital intercourse, however they engaged in a wide range of non-genital sexual behaviors. Chaperonage was uncommon and courting couples were generally given privacy. (Note: An exception was the South, where more restrictive courtship practices were enforced.) Couples also engaged in group activities, such as picnics and parties. In higher class society, chaperonage was more common.

=== Personal ads ===
Between 1820 and 1860, when populations in cities increased by 797%, many of the new urbanites lacked social or family networks through which they might meet potential partners. Women in particular found personal ads to be a means for exercising some control over their circumstances. An 1890 study of female respondents to personal ads in the United States found that they sought independence from societal expectations and a degree of equality in the matter of marriage. (The criminologist who performed the study was scandalized by the responses, believing "they bordered on moral depravity".)

The years following the Civil War in the United States brought a huge mismatch in the number of available men in the east (more than 600,000 killed in the war) and in the number of available women on the western frontier, where mostly men had migrated to pursue mining, fur trading, farming, logging, and exploring. Rural areas of Illinois in the 1850s, for example, averaged one woman for every twenty-five men. States in the west which suffered from the imbalance between men and women passed numerous laws intended to encourage women to immigrate, such as property protection for women (as opposed to coverture laws common in eastern states) and female suffrage. The welcoming political climate was an incentive for women to respond to marriage ads and marriage recruiting efforts.

During the Civil War, soldiers and sailors placed personal ads to find correspondents, and for a woman to reply to these ads was considered a patriotic act. Many military men and their correspondents formed romantic relationships.

=== Calling ===
In the late 19th century, a young woman's family would invite a young man to "call" on her, a middle-class system in which the young woman's family provided hospitality while supervising their courtship. A young man would not call on a young woman without that invitation, although he could imply by his manner that he would welcome one. The system of calling was governed by rules promulgated by national magazines, advice columns, and books of etiquette, which prescribed how soon one should make a call after being invited to do so, (Note: The man should call on the woman within a fortnight of the invitation.) whether refreshments should be served, to what degree the call should be chaperoned, proper topics of conversation, and how the call should be ended. The clear implication was that the etiquette of calling displayed one's manners and breeding. Primarily a system among the middle class, those with aspirations to the middle class would also follow the conventions of calling.

=== Treating ===
Among the urban working class, as young women became employed and were living on their own, the practice of treating developed. Treating was the practice of providing companionship and intimate activity in exchange for entertainment outings, gifts, and other items of monetary value, such as tickets and clothes, leading to the working class slang term "date". These working girls were labelled "charity girls" by reformers, who were shocked to learn that the "charity girls" were not interested in being "rescued". In urban areas such as the Bowery, the expectation of sexual activity in exchange for presents and outings became part of courtship patterns in the youth culture.

== 1900 to 1960 ==
The beginning of the 20th century was accompanied by a reversal of the Victorian era system of gender segregation. Young people were more independent, often working outside of the home; more women went to college. Opportunities for men and women to socialize were more widely available. As an illustration of the changes taking place, a chapter in Emily Post's Etiquette was titled "The Chaperon and Other Conventions" in 1922; it was retitled "The Vanishing Chaperon and Other New Conventions" in 1927, and then "The Vanished Chaperon and Other Lost Conventions" by 1937.

=== From calling to dating ===
While the previous decade's practice of calling on a young woman in her home was initiated by the woman and her family, the newer custom of dating gave the initiative to the man as he was expected to pay for their entertainment. The transition from calling to dating was a significant transformation in the courtship process. Women had controlled the calling system and took the initiative. In dating, men held control and took the initiative. Dating took courtship out of the private home and into the public sphere. The expectations of entertainment (dining, dancing, movies, and so forth) added economic issues to dating, and the practice was often viewed as an economic transaction.

Older standards of conduct were quickly abandoned during and after the First World War. By the 1920s, dating and petting became social rituals that define courtship. Couples had always paired off, but the peer-enforced expectations around dating behaviors were new and quickly dominated courting behavior. Dating filled the social gap between casual group activities and serious courtship with the intent to marry. The Kinsey Report found that the generation that became adults during the 1910s and 1920s had the greatest increase in premarital sexual activity, and "later generations appear to have accepted the new pattern and maintained or extended it". The general public acceptance of dating around 1910 coincided with the introduction of sex education in public schools.

=== Activities ===
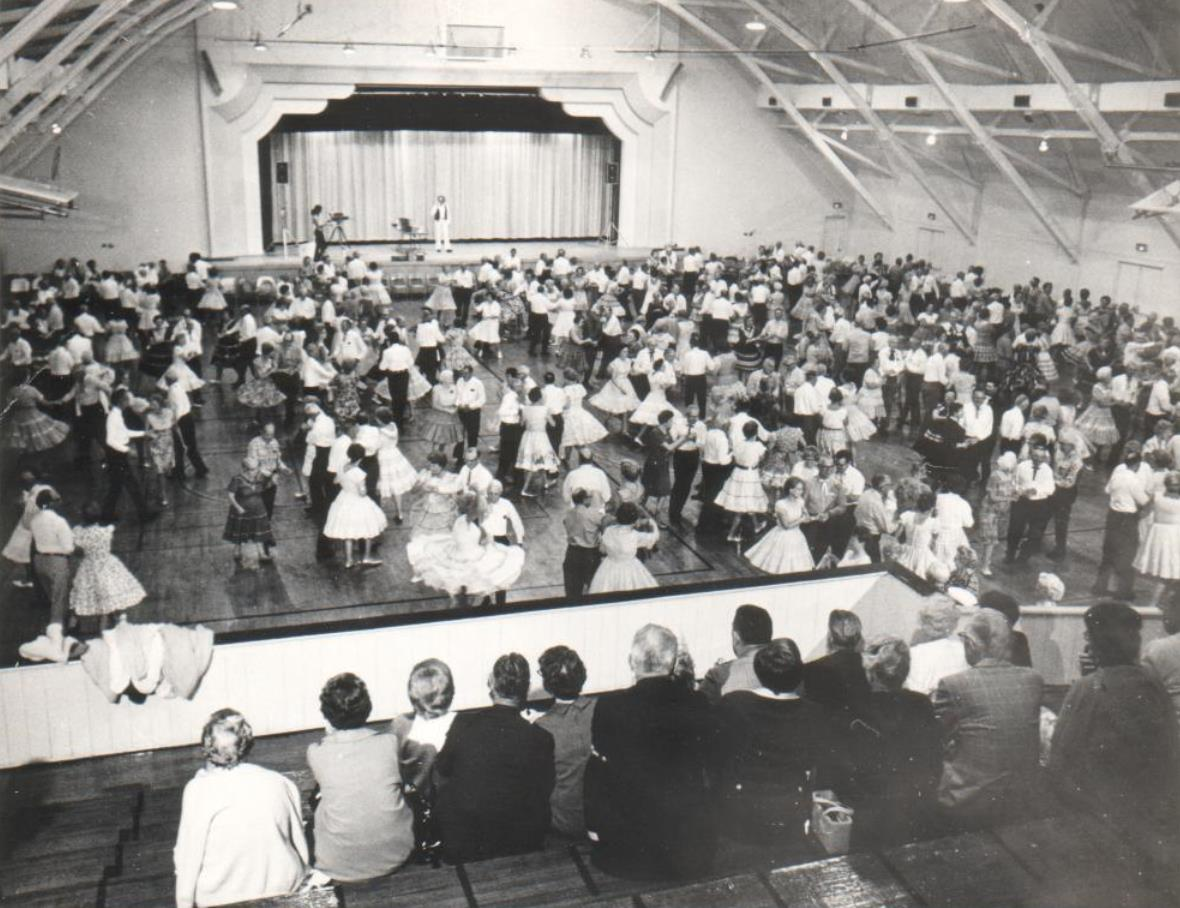
Dances were a popular activity for couples.

With a greater part of the population now living in urban areas, entertainments outside of the home and church were popular options for courting. Couples (by themselves or with other couples) went to movies, dance halls, vaudeville shows, and restaurants.

Dancing, always a popular courting activity, became the most popular pastime in the 1920s, both in high school and college. Numerous dances were held at colleges, usually by fraternities. A common feature at these dances in the 1920s was the "stag line", young men who would "cut in" to take another man's partner. Frequent cut-ins raised the social status of both the young woman and her date.

The increasing number of enclosed cars resulted in the automobile becoming an essential for courting, with the privacy that they provided encouraging intimacy. "Parking" (making out in a car) at lovers' lanes was common. Young men and women, both in high school and college, often attended "petting parties" at which couples could experiment while the quasi-public setting limited the extent of the sexual experimentation. In a survey of young women in college in the 1920s, 92% reported having engaged in petting.

=== Competitive dating ===
Although the practice of dating dominated American courtship, it also became the arena for social competition and popularity. In a series of lectures at Stanford University in 1946, anthropologist Margaret Mead stated that dating was primarily a form of competition rather than a form of courtship, and that Americans "had no courtship rituals".

During the 1930s, high school and college students generally dated multiple people, colloquially called "playing the field". Dating patterns involved variety and competition, and multiple partners were a signal of popularity. Sociologists characterize this form of dating as "competitive". In 1937, sociologist Willard Waller, based on a study at Penn State College, (Note: In 1930, when Waller conducted his study, the ratio of male students to female students at Penn State was 6:1.) described it as a "rating and dating complex" in which males and females were rated in popularity by themselves and their peers on characteristics such as having money and good clothes, belonging to the best sorority or fraternity, and dating the "right" people, although some later researchers question whether Waller's observations reflected as widespread a pattern as he implied and note that some individuals chose to pair off exclusively before it became the style. Waller did not consider dating to be "true courtship" as the participants typically did not have an objective of marriage.

Magazines and etiquette guides reinforced the "rating and dating complex", advising female college freshmen on how to create an "image of popularity" and encouraging male college students to date many women. The system of dating multiple partners in order to be considered "popular" spread from the colleges to the general public, and competitive dating became the custom in high schools. The competition was particularly visible at dances, where the ideal for a woman was to be "cut in" so frequently that she never had the same partner for more than one turn around the dance floor. (Note: The practice of cutting in on a dance partner mostly vanished by the early 1950s, when couples expected to dance only with each other.)

=== Gender roles ===
From the 1930s through the 1950s, increased importance was placed on how men and women conformed to culturally-constructed gender roles. Young people in the courtship phase of their lives were bombarded with messaging aimed to impose strict adherence to masculine and feminine ideals.

The clearly defined roles resulted in an etiquette that provided a roadmap to young men and young women; with all of the rules made explicit, each knew how to behave on a date. Dutch dating, in which both participants split the cost of a date, was almost universally condemned as demonstrating independence on the part of the woman which would threaten the masculinity of the man. Men should order for both in a restaurant; a woman should never open a door for herself. Women were told to avoid any display of independence or intelligence, and men were told to resent those displays should they occur. Men were told to be in charge and demonstrate mastery of any situation, and women were told to expect men to make all decisions. Only men should initiate physical displays of affection, which women could reject or respond to.

The rigid conventions of this etiquette were also a source of resentment and insecurity, as both young men and young women felt constantly judged against a cultural ideal.

=== Going steady ===
The Great Depression put a damper on courtship; few could afford an extravagant social whirl, much less consider early marriage. In 1932, the marriage rate, which had been 10.14 per 1,000 three years earlier, fell to 7.9 per 1,000. Men were less likely to consider themselves financially secure enough for marriage. With the end of the depression being quickly followed by the onset of World War II and millions of young men entering the military, "marriageable men" became a scarcity. (Note: In the 1930s, the ratio of men to women was 5:1 at Massachusetts State; when WWII began, the ratio became 1:8.) Even with the end of the war, national magazines repeatedly warned that many women would never marry because of a "man shortage" and a "surplus of women".

Steady dating began to supplant dating multiple partners. There was a rapid move away from competitive dating and toward committed relationships. The marriage rate, which had been 7.9 per 1,000 in 1932,, increased to 13.2 per 1,000 in 1942 and to 16.4 per 1,000 in 1946. Some historians credit the shortage of male partners during the war; however, the end of the war did not end the practice, and going steady became even more pervasive after the war ended. Going steady was a form of serial monogamy.

Initially, going steady was seen as a generally serious commitment with an intent to marry eventually. By the 1950s, steady couples no longer expected to marry each other at some point, but they behaved as if they were married. Going steady was a frequent theme in popular teen novels of the time. High school students were expected to enter committed heterosexual relationships or become socially marginalized. Sociologist Wini Breines characterizes it as "a routinized sexual system that controlled and punished female spontaneity and ensured that young women followed the prescribed steps to marriage".

=== Early marriage ===
There is speculation that the emphasis on early marriage during and after WWII was linked to the impulse to go steady. Toward the end of the 1940s and into the 1950s, marrying young was encouraged and celebrated. Women's magazines promoted the notion that the purpose of women going to college was to find a husband. Respected academics endorsed the trend of early marriage. Parents' magazines suggested that parents should provide financial support to enable their children to marry young. The average age at marriage had grown younger over the decades, with a brief exception during the depression. By 1959, 47% of all brides were younger than 19. The convention of early marriages, which came to be seen as the "natural" condition, lasted until the mid-1960s.

Average age at marriage
Year	Men	Women
1890	26.1	22
1910	25.1	21.6
1930	24.3	21.3
1939	26.7	23.3
1951	22.6	20.4

The results of a study by the Institute of Marital Relations published in 1948 found that only 56% of women stated that they had married for love. The rest cited financial security, the desire to have children, and the fear of being a spinster as their reasons for marrying.

=== Dating in the 1950s ===
With early marriage becoming the accepted norm, participation in dating and petting occurred at even younger ages in the 1950s. Junior high and even elementary school students were encouraged to attend "boy-girl" parties and dances. A 1966 study found that children as young as 11 were dating, going steady, had "kissed seriously", and considered themselves to have been "in love".

By high school, dating was one of the most time-consuming activities in young peoples' lives, with the majority of high school students going steady by the time they were seniors. The decade was a period of pre-marital monogamy. In 1957, the president of Amherst College said:

In the twenties and early thirties, when the social pattern was one of multiple or polygamous dating—on the part of both boys and girls—young people did not think nearly so much about marriage as they do today...They dated each other for the fun of it, because they enjoyed each other's company, because they liked the same things, or merely because in the competitive social life of their time it was a good thing to have dates—the more, the better. Today young people often play with the idea of marriage as early as the second or third date, and they certainly think about it by the fifth or sixth. By the time they have been going steady for a while they are quite apt to be discussing the number and names of their future children.

Men who did not marry were viewed suspiciously by employers and colleagues; they felt pressured by society to marry so as to be seen as mature and successful. Women who did not marry were often ostracized. Studies in the 1950s found that stability, security, and companionship were key factors in women identifying their marriages as "happy".

== 1960 to present ==
The 1960s were marked by disruption to American society by movements driven by youth culture, the Vietnam War protests, the civil rights movement, the women's liberation movement, and the gay liberation movement. The formal dating rituals of the 1950s began to decline and the rigidity of gender role expectations loosened. Young men and women continued to date, but the motivations were "intrinsic satisfaction" and increased intimacy rather than for prestige or expectations of it leading to marriage.

The sexual revolution of the 1960s that introduced casual sex and questioned gender roles contributed to the abolition of traditional courtship. The norms of dating relaxed to incorporate intercourse prior to engagement. More couples chose cohabitation before, or instead of, marriage. For many members of Generation X, cohabitation is considered to be like a "trial marriage" or even a commitment similar to marriage, with some seeing little distinction between living together and being married.

Young couples experimented with individualized courtship patterns. Fewer young people met prospective partners through the family and more through friends. Marriage was no longer considered the "master event" of their sexual lives and adulthood. Socializing in mixed-sex groups began to displace dating. The old rituals of dating, courtship, and marriage were replaced by conflict and uncertainty, although many young people continued to comply with some of the gendered conventions, such as who can ask someone out. To many, the dating scene was daunting, even hazardous, as the guardrails around dating and premarital sex vanished.

The old-fashioned dating scripts that relied on outdated expectations of gender roles were gradually discarded. The absence of those social norms resulted in "courtships that are fraught with confusion and mixed messages". From the sexual revolution of the 1960s through the start of the twenty-first century, the accepted linear patterns of courtship dissolved, as did the expectation that emotional, physical, and financial investments in a relationship would lead to a permanent commitment. Sociologist Barbara Dafoe Whitehead says:

Most societies have had a script and young adults have been guided through that script. And now the script is being so radically revised that nobody knows what it is anymore or people have torn it up.

=== Marrying at later ages ===
By the 1980s, there were few remaining rules for courtship. Clear expectations for how a couple would meet, socialize, and commit to each other were gone, leaving only uncertainty and occasional nostalgia for "traditional" courtship customs. Marriage also lost significance as the primary marker of adulthood, which made dating and cohabitation less tightly linked to courtship as a marriage-directed process.

=== Ads and online dating ===
Personal advertisements, computer dating, online dating, and dating apps gave people ways to meet potential partners outside family, church, school, work, and local social networks. Online dating expands a person's field of eligible partners beyond their own social network and geographic location.

=== Hooking up versus dating ===
Hooking up was relatively widespread by the early 2000s, although traditional dating persisted on campuses in the South and schools associated with active religious affiliations. Sociologist Kathleen Bogle states that students meet in large mixed-sex settings rather than have formal dates, and from there may "hook up". The tradition of dating leading to emotional commitment and then sex is reversed in the practice of engaging in sexual activity first, which then may lead to emotional commitment and a relationship. Research also found that dating and hooking up are "coexisting and even complementary patterns", and that students engage in both activities.

== See also ==
- Culture of Domesticity
- Matchmaking
