= Janet Lambert =

American novelist

Janet Lambert (December 1893 – March 16, 1973) was an American actress and the author of 54 young-adult fiction titles for girls from 1941 to 1969. Lambert's works, best known for the Penny and Tippy Parrish series, focused on the lives and coming-of-age choices of the wives and children, especially the daughters, of U.S. Army officers during World War II and the Korean War-era.

== Family life ==
Lambert was born Maude Janet "Dodi" Snyder December 12 or 17, 1893 in or near Crawfordsville, Indiana, the daughter of Mabel Galey and Francis Leonidas Snyder.

She married Kent Craig Lambert (1891–1982) on January 1, 1918. Kent, a brother of longtime Purdue basketball coach, Ward Lambert, was a 1913 graduate of Wabash College in Crawfordsville, Indiana. Serving in World War I, he continued his Army career as a cavalry officer. In World War II, he saw service in North Africa, Anzio and China. His last posting was as post commander of Fort Jay, Governors Island, in New York City where he retired at the rank of colonel in 1951 after 34 years active duty. A photograph of Janet and Kent's formal military farewell from Fort Jay and the Army illustrated the dust jacket of one of her books.

Lambert performed on the Broadway stage in the years before and during World War I.

The couple had one daughter, Jeanne Anne Lambert (born 1918) who, much like a character in her mother's books, married a United States Military Academy graduate, Second Lieutenant Dean Titus Vanderhoef (USMA 1940), at Fort Jay's post chapel on July 27, 1940.

== Literary legacy ==
Between 1941 and 1969, Lambert published 54 books at a rate of about two per year, but is often omitted from discussions of early young adult romance literature by critics.

Lambert integrated real-world events as background in her books, such as the reconstruction of Germany after World War II (Little Miss Atlas, 1949) and the Korean War (Don't Cry, Little Girl, 1952). Lambert's life experience as an Army wife provided the background and settings for many of her books about the lives of teenage children of military officers. While the U.S. Military Academy figures appear frequently in the lives of her characters, her husband did not attend West Point, gaining his officer training through the National Guard and mid-level Army schools such at the United States Army Cavalry School at Fort Riley, Kansas. In 1930, he was instructor at the Virginia Military Institute. Many of the male characters in Lambert's novels are soldiers or West Point students, and present a patriotic, "almost worshipful" view of the military.

As for her female characters, often military wives or children, she drew on her experiences and observations as a military wife who had to balance career aspirations and married life.

Lambert died on March 16, 1973, at Beach Haven, New Jersey, and is buried in Crawfordsville, Indiana.

== Works ==
Listed by series and years of original publication:

=== Penny Parrish novels ===
- Star Spangled Summer 1941
- Dreams of Glory 1942
- Glory Be! 1943
- Up Goes the Curtain 1946
- Practically Perfect 1947
- The Reluctant Heart 1950

=== Tippy Parrish novels ===
- Miss Tippy 1948
- Little Miss Atlas 1949
- Miss America 1951
- Don't Cry, Little Girl 1952
- Rainbow After Rain 1953
- Welcome Home, Mrs. Jordon 1953
- Song in Their Hearts 1956
- Here's Marny 1969

=== Jordon novels ===
- Just Jennifer 1945
- Friday's Child 1947
- Confusion by Cupid 1950
- A Dream for Susan 1954
- Love Taps Gently 1955
- Myself & I 1957
- The Stars Hang High 1960
- Wedding Bells 1961
- A Bright Tomorrow 1965

=== Parri MacDonald novels ===
- Introducing Parri 1962
- That's My Girl 1964
- Stagestruck Parri 1966
- My Davy 1968

=== Candy Kane novels ===
- Candy Kane 1943
- Whoa, Matilda 1944
- One for the Money 1946

=== Dria Meredith novels ===
- Star Dream 1951
- Summer for Seven 1952
- High Hurdles 1955

=== Campbell novels ===
- The Precious Days 1957
- For Each Other 1959
- Forever and Ever 1961
- Five's a Crowd 1963
- First of All 1966
- The Odd Ones 1969

=== Sugar Bradley novels ===
- Sweet as Sugar 1967
- Hi, Neighbor 1968

=== Christie Drayton novels ===
- Where the Heart Is 1948
- Treasure Trouble 1949

=== Patty and Ginger novels ===
- We're Going Steady 1958
- Boy Wanted 1959
- Spring Fever 1960
- Summer Madness 1962
- Extra Special 1963
- On Her Own 1964

=== Cinda Hollister novels ===
- Cinda 1954
- Fly Away, Cinda 1956
- Big Deal 1958
- Triple Trouble 1965
- Love to Spare 1967
