= Betty Cavanna =

American novelist (1909–2001)

- Born: Elizabeth Cavanna; 24 Jun 1909; Camden, New Jersey
- Died: August 13, 2001 (aged 92); Vézelay, France
- Education: Douglass College
- Spouse(s): Edward T. Headley; George Russell Harrison
- Children: 1
- Writing career
- Years active: 1946–1980
- Genre: Young adult fiction

Betty Cavanna (June 24, 1909 – August 13, 2001) was the author of popular teen romance novels, mysteries, and children's books for 45 years. She also wrote under the names Elizabeth Headley and Betsy Allen. She was nominated for the Edgar Award for Best Juvenile in 1970 and 1972.

== Personal life ==
Cavanna had infantile paralysis when she was four years old, which left her unable to walk for several years. Later, she was able to walk with a steel brace. Her first job was on a Camden newspaper at age 12. Cavanna studied journalism at Douglass College, which is now part of Rutgers University. After college, she worked for a newspaper in Bayonne. Later, she worked in publicity and advertising for the Presbyterian Board of Christian Education in Philadelphia.

Cavanna married Edward Headley in 1940 and they had one son. Headley died in 1952. In 1957, she married George Russell Harrison, a writer and a dean of science at the Massachusetts Institute of Technology. Harrison died in 1979. For the last few years of her life, Cavanna lived in Vézelay, France. She died at age 92 in 2001.

== Writing career ==
Cavanna began writing in 1940. She published serials in American Girl, Boys Today, Gateway for Girls, Pioneer for Boys and other teenage magazines.

Like many novels for teen girls of the era (notably Rosamond du Jardin's and Anne Emery's, which are often discussed with Cavanna's), her plots favored romance and conformity. The choice of the right dress and the right boyfriend were often the key to happiness. Cavanna's heroines generally had a special interest or ambition, and tended to be not typically "pretty". Her early romance novels presented a protagonist facing a personal problem, but her later novels matured to focus on a social or moral problem.

Cavanna wrote the Connie Blair books, a career and mystery series, as "Betsy Allen". A friend of Cavanna's wrote the final book in the series in 1958, The Mystery of the Ruby Queens. In the 1960s, Cavanna wrote a series of books about the lives of boys in foreign countries. Her husband, George Harrison, took the photographs used in the books.

Richard Alm characterizes Cavanna as "a writer of some importance". Cavanna's books have been translated into several foreign languages. Her manuscripts and correspondence are preserved in the de Grummond Collection at the University of Southern Mississippi.

== Books ==
=== As Betty Cavanna ===
- 1943, Puppy Stakes
- 1944, The Black Spaniel Mystery
- 1945, Going on Sixteen
- 1946, Secret Passage
- 1946, Spurs for Suzanna
- 1947, A Girl Can Dream
- 1948, Paintbox Summer
- 1950, Spring Comes Riding
- 1951, Two's Company
- 1953, Lasso Your Heart
- 1954, Love, Laurie
- 1955, Six on Easy Street
- 1955, Passport to Romance
- 1955, The First Book of Seashells
- 1956, The Boy Next Door
- 1957, Angel on Skis
- 1958, Stars in Her Eyes
- 1959, The Scarlet Sail
- 1960, Accent on April
- 1960, Arne of Norway
- 1961, Lucho of Peru
- 1961, The First Book of Wildflowers
- 1961, Fancy Free
- 1961, A Touch of Magic
- 1962, A Time for Tenderness
- 1962, Paulo of Brazil
- 1962, Pepe of Argentina
- 1962, Chico of Guatemala
- 1963, Lo Chau of Hong Kong
- 1963, Almost Like Sisters
- 1964, Jenny Kimura
- 1964, Noko of Japan
- 1964, Carlos of Mexico
- 1965, Doug of Australia
- 1965, Tavi of the South Seas
- 1965, Mystery at Love's Creek
- 1966, A Breath of Fresh Air
- 1966, Ali of Egypt
- 1966, Demetrios of Greece
- 1966, The First Book of Wool
- 1967, The Country Cousin
- 1968, Mystery in Marrakech
- 1969, Spice Island Mystery
- 1969, The First Book of Fiji
- 1970, The First Book of Morocco
- 1971, Mystery on Safari
- 1971, The Ghost of Ballyhooly
- 1972, Mystery in the Museum
- 1973, Petey
- 1974, Joyride, Morrow
- 1975, Ruffles and Drums
- 1976, Mystery of the Emerald Buddha
- 1978, Runaway Voyage
- 1981, Stamp Twice for Murder
- 1981, The Surfer and the City Girl
- 1983, Storm in Her Heart
- 1984, Romance on Trial
- 1984, Wanted: A Girl for the Horses
- 1987, Banner Year

=== As Elizabeth Headley ===
- 1946, A Date for Diane
- 1947, Take a Call, Topsy! (reprinted under name Betty Cavanna as Ballet Fever in 1978)
- 1949, She's My Girl! (reprinted under name Betty Cavanna as You Can't Take Twenty Dogs on a Date in 1979)
- 1951, Catchpenny Street (reprinted under name Betty Cavanna in 1975)
- 1955, Diane's New Love
- 1957, Tourjours Diane

=== As Betsy Allen ===
- 1948, The Clue in Blue
- 1948, The Riddle in Red
- 1948. Puzzle in Purple
- 1948, The Secret of Black Cat Gulch
- 1949, The Green Island Mystery
- 1950, The Ghost Wore White
- 1951, The Yellow Warning
- 1953, The Gray Menace
- 1954, The Brown Satchel Mystery
- 1955, Peril in Pink
- 1956, The Silver Secret
- 1958, The Mystery of the Ruby Queens
