= Marie Lee (writer) =

American novelist

Marie Myung-Ok Lee
- Education: Brown University (AB, 1986)
- Employer: Brown University

Korean name
- Hangul: 이명옥
- RR: I Myeongok
- MR: I Myŏngok

Marie Myung-Ok Lee is an American author, novelist and essayist. She is a cofounder of the Asian American Writers' Workshop (AAWW). This organisation was formed in 1991 to support New York City writers of color.

== Biography ==
Lee and her family grew up in Hibbing, Minnesota, a small and remote mining town. Her father was a physician, and both of her parents fled North Korea to the South, eventually moving to Minnesota when her mother secured a United States visa.

In 1986, Lee graduated with a Bachelor of Arts from Brown University.

== Novels ==
=== Young adult novels ===
Under the name Marie G. Lee, Lee has also written several young adult novels: Finding My Voice (1992), If It Hadn't Been for Yoon Jun (1993), Saying Goodbye (1994), Necessary Roughness (1996), and F is for Fabuloso (1999).

Finding My Voice is generally considered to be the "first teen novel released by a major publisher with a contemporary Asian American protagonist by an Asian American author" and tells the story of high school senior Ellen Sung as she deals with racism as belonging to the only Korean American (or family of color for that matter) in town. In late 2020 and early 2021, Finding My Voice was reissued by Soho Teen. For the novel, Lee won a "Best Book for Reluctant Readers" award from the American Library Association in 1992. In 1993, Finding My Voice also earned the Young People's Literature Award from the Friends of American Writers, and was also placed on the 1994 Young Adults' Choices list by the International Reading Association. In 1997, the novel was featured on the American Library Association list of "Popular Paperbacks for Young Adults."

Lee's novel Saving Goodbye is a sequel to Finding My Voice, which follows the character of Ellen Jung as she graduates from high school and enters her freshman year at Harvard University.

Necessary Roughness is about a Korean-American boy named Chan Kim who moves from Los Angeles to the fictional city of Iron Town, Minnesota, and plays football in order to deal with the racism he faces from his peers and to escape problems he confronts with his parents and the rest of his family.

=== Other novels ===
Lee's novel, Somebody's Daughter (2005), is based on her year as a Fulbright Scholar to South Korea, taking oral histories of Korean birth mothers. She has been involved in the adoptee community for many years, but Lee herself is not adopted. One of her family members is adopted from Korea. She is also one of fifty journalists who have been granted a visa to North Korea since the Korean War.

Lee's most recent novel The Evening Hero (2021), from Simon & Schuster, is about the "future of medicine, immigration, and North Korea".

== Short stories, essays and accolades ==
Her stories and essays have been published in The Atlantic, Witness, The Kenyon Review, TriQuarterly, Newsweek, Slate, Guernica, The Guardian and The New York Times.

She has received honors for her work including an O. Henry honorable mention for an adaptation of a chapter from Somebody's Daughter.

Lee was a recipient of the MacColl Johnson literature fellowship and 2010 Fiction Fellowship from the Rhode Island State Council on the Arts. She was also a Yaddo, MacDowell Colony, and Virginia Center for the Creative Arts (VCCA) fellow, and a New York Foundation for the Arts fiction fellow.

== Teaching and personal ==
Lee has served as a National Book Award judge as well as a judge for the PEN/E. O. Wilson Literary Science Writing Award.

She has taught fiction writing at Yale University, was a Visiting Lecturer in American Studies at her alma mater Brown University, and is also an adjunct professor at Columbia University, where she teaches creative writing in the school's Writing Division.

She is also a founder and former board president of the Asian American Writers' Workshop in New York City.

She is married to Karl Jacoby (also a Brown University 1987 graduate), an environmental historian at Columbia University, and lives in New York City.

== Bibliography ==
- Finding My Voice, 1992
- If It Hadn't Been for Yoon Jun, 1993
- Saying Goodbye, 1994
- Necessary Roughness, 1996
- F is for Fabuloso, 1999
- Somebody's Daughter, 2005
- The Evening Hero, 2021
