= Finding My Voice =

Novel by Marie Myung-Ok Lee

- Author: Marie Myung-Ok Lee
- Language: English
- Genre: Young adult
- Publisher: HarperCollins
- Publication date: 1992
- Publication place: United States
- Media type: Print (hardback and paperback) and ebook
- Pages: 172
- ISBN: 9780064472456 (hardback)

Finding My Voice is a young adult novel by Marie Myung-Ok Lee (writing as Marie G. Lee). First published in 1992, Finding My Voice was republished in 2001 by Harper Trophy, and was reissued in 2021. Finding My Voice is generally considered to be the "first teen novel released by a major publisher with a contemporary Asian American protagonist by an Asian American author". An excerpt from Finding My Voice was included in the anthology Prejudice: stories about hate, ignorance, revelation, and transformation and in Literary themes for students: the American dream: examining diverse literature to understand and compare universal themes.

Lee's novel Saying Goodbye is the sequel to Finding My Voice.

== Plot ==
Finding My Voice is a frank presentation of the issue of racism through the experiences of Ellen Sung, a high school senior, who is the daughter of Korean immigrants and is attracted to Tomper, a white classmate.

== Reception ==
Kirkus Reviews described it as "Honestly rendered, and never didactic, the story allows readers first to flinch in recognition and then to look into their own hearts." Publishers Weekly's review said "If Lee's story line is somewhat familiar, her portrayal of her heroine is unusually well balanced."

Monica Chiu states "Lee's novel exemplifies that some authority cannot be subverted by young adults, and that students are disadvantaged in fighting a system that is more powerful than they are." Eve Becker, writing in the Chicago Tribune, says the book helps readers understand what it is like to be an outsider, but calls it "sort of predictable".

== Honors ==
The American Library Association named Finding My Voice the Best Book for Reluctant Readers in 1992. In 1993, Finding My Voice received the Young People's Literature Award from the Friends of American Writers. The International Reading Association placed it on their 1994 Young Adults' Choices list. In 1997, it was on the American Library Association list of Popular Paperbacks for Young Adults.
