= Anne Emery (young adult writer) =

American author of popular teen romance novels from 1946 to 1980

- Born: Anne Eleanor McGuigan; Sep 1, 1907; Fargo, North Dakota, U.S.
- Died: July 4, 1987 (aged 79); Menlo Park, California, U.S.
- Education: Northwestern University
- Spouse: John Douglas Emery
- Children: 5
- Writing career
- Years active: 1946–1980
- Genre: Young adult fiction

Anne Emery (September 1, 1907 – July 4, 1987) was the writer of popular teen romance novels from 1946 to 1980.

== Personal life ==
Anne Emery, née Anne Eleanor McGuigan, was born Sep 1, 1907 in Fargo, North Dakota. She was raised in Evanston, Illinois, attended Northwestern University, and then taught school in Evanston. She married John Douglas Emery in 1933. They had four daughters and one son. Emery died July 4, 1987, in Menlo Park, California.

== Writing career ==
In 1941, Emery began writing short stories. Her first sale was a 500-word story for $1.25. Her first novel, Tradition, explored the internment of Japanese Americans during World War II through the eyes of a white protagonist. Tradition, which received favorable reviews, was one of four children's books recommended for National Brotherhood Week by the National Conference of Christians and Jews.

Emery went on to write dozens of what were sometimes known as "malt shop novels". In multiple books, Emery addressed the fashion of going steady by exposing the potential negatives of the trend. In Going Steady, she illustrates this through a couple who married too young, the wife pregnant and the husband trapped in a menial job.

Although many of Emery's novels fit the formulaic stereotype of teen romance, the set of novels featuring Dinny Gordon, a high-school student with a passion for archeology, focuses on the growth and development of the title character rather than the machinations of finding a boyfriend. In writing the Dinny Gordon books, Emery is described as a "transitional author", bridging the domestic patterns of the 1950s and the more female career-oriented 1960s. Joyce Litton characterizes the themes of independence, nontraditional career choices, and Dinny's refusal to be obsessed with her appearance as a "harbinger of later feminist critiques". The character Dinny Gordon was unusual at the time in teen fiction for her intellectual passion; for instance, she worked at part-time jobs to save money for a trip to Pompeii rather than for clothes and make-up.

In Free Not to Love, Emery addresses teen-age sex and, rather than showing heavy-handed consequences, has her protagonist reach the conclusion that sex is not a solution to loneliness.

In addition to over 30 teen romance novels, Emery wrote seven historical novels for children. Several of her books were translated into Japanese, one into German, and several were combined into an Italian compilation.

Her manuscripts and correspondence are preserved at the University of Oregon Library (Eugene). In the 2000s, her books were reissued by Image Cascade Publishing.

== Reception ==
Reviewers for the New York Times generally praised Emery's books. Of Mountain Laurel: "An uncommonly good novel for older girls" and "the background, good as it is, never obscures the humanity of the characters". E. L. B., reviewing Sorority Girl, praised Emery for "her usual acute understanding of present-day teen-ager problems". Gerald Raftery declared that her historical novel, A Spy in Old Detroit, was "soundly researched, the story follows the facts faithfully". Phyllis Whitney praised Senior Year for "sound values presented in a way that makes its points without preaching" and added "particularly praiseworthy is the way Anne Emery has handled the matter of drinking among young people." An exception was That Archer Girl, about which the reviewer said that the title character "might well be a good subject for a psychiatric case study, she is too humorless to be an appealing villainess".

Jill Anderson writes that "Emery consistently used the formulaic nature of the junior novel, with its emphasis on personal growth and adjustment, to explore more challenging ethical issues, from cheating to urban and Appalachian poverty to anti-Semitism and prejudice against Nisei internees."

As contrasted to fellow teen romance authors such as Rosamond du Jardin, critics felt Emery's books presented a more realistic presentation of teen love.

While not every novel was favorably received, Richard Alm labeled Emery "a novelist of considerable merit" and described her books as "well-told stories about credible adolescents".

== Publication history ==
Release	Title	Publisher	OCLC	Illustrator
1946	Tradition	Vanguard Press	1687280	Ruth King
1947	Bright Horizons	G. P. Putnam	1684714	Raymond Vartanian
1948	Mystery of the Opal Ring	Westminster Press	693578815	
1948	Mountain Laurel	G. P. Putnam	1011018156	
1949	Senior Year	Scholastic Book Service	8450581	
1952	Scarlet Royal	Westminster Press	1098803234	Manning de V Lee
1952	Sorority Girl	Westminster Press	299588	Richard Horwitz
1953	Vagabond Summer	Westminster Press	1682837	
1953	County Fair: a 4-H romance	Macrae Smith	1683923	
1954	High Note, Low Note	Westminster Press	1619059	
1955	Campus Melody	Westminster Press	1825366	
1955	Hickory Hill: a 4-H romance	Macrae Smith	1683901	
1956	Sweet Sixteen	Macrae Smith	575946097	
1956	First Love, True Love	Westminster Press	654279	
1957	First Orchid for Pat	Westminster Press	607261906	
1957	Married on Wednesday	Berkley	9968468	
1958	A Spy in Old Philadelphia	Rand McNally	26499410	Herman B. Vestal
1958	A Dream to Touch	Macrae Smith	1281634	
1958	First Love Farewell	Westminster Press	1282662	
1959	Going Steady	Scholastic Book Service	5718278	
1959	Dinny Gordon, Freshman	Macrae Smith	1020641609	
1959	That Archer Girl	Westminster Press	1281133	
1960	A Spy in Old New Orleans	Rand McNally	1418233	Emil Weiss
1961	Dinny Gordon, Sophomore	Macrae Smith	1281674	
1961	The Popular Crowd	Westminster Press	1296714	
1963	A Spy in Old Detroit	Rand McNally	37201650	Herman B. Vestal
1964	Dinny Gordon, Junior	Macrae Smith	1285967	
1965	The Losing Game	Westminster Press	10245012	
1965	A Spy in Old West Point	Rand McNally	26499491	Lorence F. Bjorklund
1965	Dinny Gordon, Senior	Macrae Smith	962865198	
1966	Joan of Arc	Harper & Row	960849617	Janice Holland
1966	Jennie Lee, Patriot	Westminster Press	1417512	
1967	American Friend: Herbert Hoover	Rand McNally	1170289	
1968	Danger in a Smiling Mask	Westminster Press	448795	
1969	Carey's Fortune	Westminster Press	27261	
1970	The Sky is Falling	Westminster Press	100037	
1975	Free Not to Love	Westminster Press	1055588	
1980	Stepfamily	Westminster Press	5831056	
