= Necessary Roughness (book) =

1996 novel by Marie G. Lee

- Necessary Roughness paperback cover
- Author: Marie G. Lee
- Language: English
- Subject: Discrimination, football, family relationships, culture clashing
- Genre: Drama
- Publisher: HarperCollins
- Publication date: November 20, 1996
- Publication place: United States
- Media type: Hardcover, mass market paperback
- Pages: 240
- ISBN: 0-06-025124-7
- OCLC: 35235249
- LC Class: PZ7.L5138 Ne 1996

Necessary Roughness (1996) is a drama novel by Asian-American author Marie G. Lee which explores themes of discrimination and a clash of cultures between Korean parents and their children's American ways. It is the story of a young Korean-American boy's transplantation from the city of Los Angeles to the fictional rural town of Iron River, Minnesota and his use of football to escape the bigotry that he faces and the conflict he experiences with his parents.

The Kim family is forced to move from their hometown of L.A. to Iron River, Minnesota. Abogee's (Chan's father) brother, Bong, left abruptly without paying any of his debts. The Kims had to pay his bills, and run the store he left behind. Chan had a twin sister, Young. Back in L.A., Chan was on a soccer team, and Young was in an orchestra. When they moved to Minnesota, however, Chan joined the football team, and a family tragedy decides his career.
