= Willard Waller =

American sociologist

Willard Walter Waller (July 30, 1899 – July 27, 1945) was an American sociologist. Much of his research concerned the sociology of the family, sociology of education and the sociology of the military. His The Sociology of Teaching (1932) was described as an "early classic" in the field of the sociology of education. Before his sudden death, he was recognized as one of the most prominent scholars in the field of sociology.

== Biography ==
Waller was born on July 30, 1899, in Murphysboro, Illinois.

He spent several years as a high school teacher at the Morgan Park Military Academy. He obtained his BA from the University of Illinois, MA from the University of Chicago, and PhD from the University of Pennsylvania. He was a faculty member at the University of Nebraska and Pennsylvania State College in the early 1930s, and at Barnard College from 1937 until his death. He was an editor and stockholder of the Dryden Press.

He died in New York City, from a sudden heart attack, on July 27, 1945.

== Impact and recognition ==
Waller's studies were often qualitative in nature (ethnographical), and he opposed excessive specialization.

Much of his research concerned the sociology of the family (with focus on courtship and divorce), sociology of education (pioneering the analysis of schools as social institutions) and the sociology of the military (with focus on veterans). He coined the term principle of least interest. His most notable studies include The Sociology of Teaching (1932), described as an "early classic" in the sociology of education. Before his sudden death, he was recognized as one of the most prominent scholars in the field of sociology. An obituary for him was published in the American Sociological Review.

American Sociological Association's annual award for the outstanding publication in the sociology of education is named after Waller.

== Works ==
- The Old Love and the New (1929)
- The Sociology of Teaching (1932) online
- The Family: A Dynamic Interpretation (1938)
- The Veteran Comes Back (1944)
- On the Family, Education, and War: Selected Writings (1970) University of Chicago Press.
