= National Book Award for Young People's Literature =

Annual literary award in the United States

- Awarded for: Outstanding work of Young People's Literature by U.S. citizens.
- Location: New York City
- Rewards: $10,000 USD (winner) $1,000 USD (finalists)
- First award: 1967–1983, 1996
- Website: National Book Foundation

The National Book Award for Young People's Literature is one of five annual National Book Awards given by the National Book Foundation (NBF) to recognize outstanding literary work by US citizens. They are awards "by writers to writers". The judging panel are five "writers who are known to be doing great work in their genre or field".

The category Young People's Literature was established in 1996. From 1969 to 1983, prior to the Foundation, there were some "Children's" categories.

The award recognizes one book written by a US citizen and published in the US from December 1 of the previous year to November 30 in the award year. The National Book Foundation accepts nominations from publishers until June 15, requires mailing nominated books to the panelists by August 1, and announces five finalists in October. The winner is announced on the day of the final ceremony in November. The award is $10,000 and a bronze sculpture; other finalists get $1000, a medal, and a citation written by the panel. (Note: Beginning 2005, the official annual webpages (see References) provide more information: the panelists in each award category, the publisher of each finalist, some audio-visual interviews with authors, etc. For 1996 to date, annual webpages generally provide transcripts of acceptance speeches by winning authors.)

There were 230 books nominated for the 2010 award. This had risen to 333 submissions by 2024.

== Finalists ==
=== Children's books, 1969 to 1979 ===
Books for "children" were first recognized by the National Book Awards in 1969 (publication year 1968). Through 1979, a single award category existed, called either "Children's Literature" or "Children's Books."

Children's Books winners and finalists, 1969 to 1979
Year	Author	Title	Result	Ref.
1969	Meindert DeJong	Journey from Peppermint Street	Winner	
1969	Lloyd Alexander	The High King	Finalist	
1969	Patricia Clapp	Constance: A Story of Early Plymouth	Finalist	
1969	Esther Hautzig	The Endless Steppe	Finalist	
1969	Milton Meltzer	Langston Hughes: A Biography	Finalist	
1970	Isaac Bashevis Singer	A Day of Pleasure: Stories of a Boy Growing up in Warsaw	Winner	
1970	Vera and Bill Cleaver	Where the Lilies Bloom	Finalist	
1970	Edna Mitchell Preston	Popcorn and Ma Goodness	Finalist	
1970	William Steig	Sylvester and the Magic Pebble	Finalist	
1970	Edwin Tunis	The Young United States, 1783–1830	Finalist	
1971	Lloyd Alexander	The Marvelous Misadventures of Sebastian	Winner	
1971	Vera and Bill Cleaver	Grover	Finalist	
1971	Paula Fox	Blowfish Live in the Sea	Finalist	
1971	Arnold Lobel	Frog and Toad are Friends	Finalist	
1971	E. B. White	The Trumpet of the Swan	Finalist	
1972	Donald Barthelme	The Slightly Irregular Fire Engine or The Hithering Thithering Djinn	Winner	
1972	Jan Adkins	The Art and Industry of Sandcastles	Finalist	
1972	John Donovan	Wild in the World	Finalist	
1972	Ursula K. Le Guin	The Tombs of Atuan	Finalist	
1972	Virginia Hamilton	The Planet of Junior Brown	Finalist	
1972	Clyde Watson	Father Fox's Pennyrhymes	Finalist	
1973	Ursula K. Le Guin	The Farthest Shore	Winner	
1973	Betsy Byars	The House of Wings	Finalist	
1973	Ingri and Edgar Parin d'Aulaire	d'Aulaires' Trolls	Finalist	
1973	Jean Craighead George	Julie of the Wolves	Finalist	
1973	Betty Jean Lifton and Thomas C. Fox	Children of Vietnam	Finalist	
1973	Georgess McHargue	The Impossible People	Finalist	
1973	Zilpha Keatley Snyder	The Witches of Worm	Finalist	
1973	William Steig	Dominic	Finalist	
1974	Eleanor Cameron	The Court of the Stone Children	Winner	
1974	Alice Childress	A Hero Ain't Nothin' but a Sandwich	Finalist	
1974	Vera and Bill Cleaver	The Whys and Wherefores of Littabelle Lee	Finalist	
1974	Julia Cunningham	The Treasure is the Rose	Finalist	
1974	Bette Greene	Summer of My German Soldier	Finalist	
1974	Kristin Hunter	Guests in the Promised Land	Finalist	
1974	E. L. Konigsburg	A Proud Taste for Scarlet and Miniver	Finalist	
1974	Norma Fox Mazer	A Figure of Speech	Finalist	
1974	F.N. Monjo	Poor Richard in France	Finalist	
1974	Harve Zemach and Margot Zemach	Duffy and the Devil	Finalist	
1975	Virginia Hamilton	M. C. Higgins the Great	Winner	
1975	Natalie Babbitt	The Devil's Storybook	Finalist	
1975	Bruce Buchenholz	Doctor in the Zoo	Finalist	
1975	Bruce Clements	I Tell a Lie Every So Often	Finalist	
1975	James Lincoln Collier and Christopher Collier	My Brother Sam is Dead	Finalist	
1975	Jason Laure with Ettagale Laure	Joi Bangla! The Children of Bangladesh	Finalist	
1975	Milton Meltzer	World of our Fathers: The Jews of Eastern Europe	Finalist	
1975	Milton Meltzer	Remember the Days	Finalist	
1975	Adrienne Richard	Wings	Finalist	
1975	Mary Stolz	The Edge of Next Year	Finalist	
1976	Walter D. Edmonds	Bert Breen's Barn	Winner	
1976	Eleanor Cameron	To the Green Mountains	Finalist	
1976	Norma Farber	As I Was Crossing Boston Common	Finalist	
1976	Isabelle Holland	Of Love and Death and Other Journeys	Finalist	
1976	David McCord	The Star in the Pail	Finalist	
1976	Nicholasa Mohr	El Bronx Remembered	Finalist	
1976	Brenda Wilkinson	Ludell	Finalist	
1977	Katherine Paterson	The Master Puppeteer	Winner	
1977	Milton Meltzer	Never to Forget: The Jews of the Holocaust	Finalist	
1977	John Ney	Ox Under Pressure	Finalist	
1977	Mildred D. Taylor	Roll of Thunder, Hear My Cry	Finalist	
1977	Barbara Wersba	Tunes for a Small Harmonica	Finalist	
1978	Judith Kohl and Herbert Kohl	The View From the Oak: The Private Worlds of Other Creatures	Winner	
1978	Betty Sue Cummings	Hew Against the Grain	Finalist	
1978	Ilse Koehn	Mischling, Second Degree: My Childhood in Nazi Germany	Finalist	
1978	David McCord	One at a Time	Finalist	
1978	William Steig	Caleb + Kate	Finalist	
1979	Katherine Paterson	The Great Gilly Hopkins	Winner	
1979	Lloyd Alexander	The First Two Lives of Lukas-Kasha	Finalist	
1979	Vera and Bill Cleaver	Queen of Hearts	Finalist	
1979	Sid Fleischman	Humbug Mountain	Finalist	
1979	Paula Fox	The Little Swineherd and Other Tales	Finalist	

=== Children's books, 1980 to 1983 ===
In 1980, under the new name The American Book Awards (TABA), the number of literary award categories jumped to 28, including two for Children's Books: hardcover and paperback. In the following three years, there were three, five, and five Children's Book award categories—thus fifteen in four years—before the program was revamped with only three annual awards and none for children's books. All books in the fiction paperback category were reprints except 1983's fiction paperback co-winner Marked by Fire.

Children's Books winners and finalists, 1980 to 1983
Year	Category	Author	Title	Result	Ref.
1980	Hardcover	Joan Blos	A Gathering of Days: A New England Girl's Journal, 1830–82	Winner	
1980	Hardcover	David Kherdian	The Road from Home	Finalist	
1980	Hardcover	E. L. Konigsburg	Throwing Shadows	Finalist	
1980	Hardcover	Ouida Sebestyen	Words by Heart	Finalist	
1980	Paperback	Madeleine L'Engle	A Swiftly Tilting Planet	Winner	
1980	Paperback	Myron Levoy	Alan and Naomi	Finalist	
1980	Paperback	Arnold Lobel	Frog and Toad Are Friends	Finalist	
1980	Paperback	Maurice Sendak	Higglety Pigglety Pop!: Or There Must Be More to Life	Finalist	
1980	Paperback	Katherine Paterson	The Great Gilly Hopkins	Finalist	
1981	Fiction, hardcover	Betsy Byars	The Night Swimmers	Winner	
1981	Fiction, hardcover	Paula Fox	A Place Apart	Finalist	
1981	Fiction, hardcover	Ouida Sebestyen	Far From Home	Finalist	
1981	Fiction, hardcover	Katherine Paterson	Jacob Have I Loved	Finalist	
1981	Fiction, hardcover	Jan Slepian	The Alfred Summer	Finalist	
1981	Fiction, paperback	Beverly Cleary	Ramona and Her Mother	Winner	
1981	Fiction, paperback	Sue Ellen Bridgers	All Together Now	Finalist	
1981	Fiction, paperback	S. E. Hinton	Tex	Finalist	
1981	Fiction, paperback	Lloyd Alexander	The High King	Finalist	
1981	Fiction, paperback	Ellen Raskin	The Westing Game	Finalist	
1981	Non-fiction	Alison Cragin Herzig and Jane Lawrence Mali	Oh, Boy! Babies	Winner	
1981	Non-fiction	Milton Meltzer	All Time, All Peoples: A World History of Slavery	Finalist	
1981	Non-fiction	Peter Spier	People	Finalist	
1981	Non-fiction	William Jaspersohn	The Ballpark	Finalist	
1981	Non-fiction	Jean Fritz	Where Do You Think You're Going, Christopher Columbus?	Finalist	
1982	Fiction, hardcover	Lloyd Alexander	Westmark	Winner	
1982	Fiction, hardcover	Cynthia Voigt	Homecoming	Finalist	
1982	Fiction, hardcover	Mildred D. Taylor	Let the Circle Be Unbroken	Finalist	
1982	Fiction, hardcover	Beverly Cleary	Ramona Quimby, Age 8	Finalist	
1982	Fiction, hardcover	Deborah Hautzig	Second Star to the Right	Finalist	
1982	Fiction, paperback	Ouida Sebestyen	Words by Heart	Winner	
1982	Fiction, paperback	Katherine Paterson	Jacob Have I Loved	Finalist	
1982	Fiction, paperback	Katherine Paterson	The Master Puppeteer	Finalist	
1982	Fiction, paperback	Lloyd Alexander	The Wizard in the Tree	Finalist	
1982	Non-fiction	Susan Bonners	A Penguin Year	Winner	
1982	Non-fiction	Melvin B. Zisfein with Robert Parker (illus.)	Flight: A Panorama of Aviation	Finalist	
1982	Non-fiction	Patricia Lauber with James Wexler (photos)	Seeds: Pop, Stick and Glide	Finalist	
1982	Non-fiction	James Howe with Mal Warshaw (photos)	The Hospital Book	Finalist	
1982	Non-fiction	Jean Fritz	Traitor: The Case of Benedict Arnold	Finalist	
1982	Picture books, hardcover	Maurice Sendak	Outside Over There	Winner	
1982	Picture books, hardcover	Chris Van Allsburg	Jumanji	Finalist	
1982	Picture books, hardcover	Olaf Baker with Stephen Gammell	Where the Buffaloes Begin	Finalist	
1982	Picture books, hardcover	Arnold Lobel with Anita Lobel (illus.)	On Market Street	Finalist	
1982	Picture books, hardcover	Nancy Willard with Alice and Martin Provensen	A Visit to William Blake's Inn	Finalist	
1983	Fiction, hardcover (Note: The 1983 panels split three awards, including two in the five Children's categories. Split awards have been prohibited continuously from 1984 (the same reform that eliminated the Children's categories).)	Jean Fritz	Homesick: My Own Story	Winner	
1983	Fiction, hardcover	Zibby Oneal	A Formal Feeling	Finalist	
1983	Fiction, hardcover	Virginia Hamilton	Sweet Whispers, Brother Rush	Finalist	
1983	Fiction, hardcover	Lloyd Alexander	The Kestrel	Finalist	
1983	Fiction, hardcover	Edward Fenton	The Refugee Summer	Finalist	
1983	Fiction, paperback	Paula Fox	A Place Apart	Winner (tie)	
1983	Fiction, paperback	Joyce Carol Thomas	Marked by Fire	Winner (tie)	
1983	Fiction, paperback	Lois Lowry	Anastasia Again!	Finalist	
1983	Fiction, paperback	Sue Ellen Bridgers	Notes for Another Life	Finalist	
1983	Fiction, paperback	Judy Blume	Tiger Eyes	Finalist	
1983	Non-fiction	James Cross Giblin	Chimney Sweeps	Winner	
1983	Non-fiction	Patricia Lauber	Journey to the Planets	Finalist	
1983	Non-fiction	John Nance	Lobo of the Tasaday	Finalist	
1983	Non-fiction	Linda Grant DePauw	Seafaring Women	Finalist	
1983	Non-fiction	Judith St. George	The Brooklyn Bridge	Finalist	
1983	Picture books, hardcover	William Steig	Doctor De Soto	Winner (tie)	
1983	Picture books, hardcover	Barbara Cooney	Miss Rumphius	Winner (tie)	
1983	Picture books, hardcover	Marcia Brown (Illus.)	Shadow (translation of a poem by Blaise Cendrars)	Finalist	
1983	Picture books, hardcover	Karla Kuskin and Marc Simont (illus.)	The Philharmonic Gets Dressed	Finalist	
1983	Picture books, hardcover	Cynthia Rylant and Diane Goode (illus.)	When I Was Young in the Mountains	Finalist	
1983	Picture books, paper	Mary Ann Hoberman with Betty Fraser (illus.)	A House is a House for Me	Winner	
1983	Picture books, paper	Peter Koeppen (Illus.)	A Swinger of Birches (poems by Robert Frost)	Finalist	
1983	Picture books, paper	Steven Kellogg	Pinkerton, Behave!	Finalist	
1983	Picture books, paper	Edward Marshall	Space Case	Finalist	
1983	Picture books, paper	Ellen Shire	The Bungling Ballerinas (original)	Finalist	

=== 1984 - 1995 ===
From 1984 to 1995, the National Book Foundation did not present awards for young people's literature.

=== Young people's literature, 1996 to date ===
Young People's Literature, 1996 to date
Year	Author	Title	Result	Ref.
1996	Victor Martinez	Parrot in the Oven, Mi Vida	Winner	
1996	Nancy Farmer	A Girl Named Disaster	Finalist	
1996	Han Nolan	Send Me Down a Miracle	Finalist	
1996	Helen Kim	The Long Season of Rain	Finalist	
1996	Carolyn Coman	What Jamie Saw	Finalist	
1997	Han Nolan	Dancing on the Edge	Winner	
1997	Tor Seidler	Mean Margaret	Finalist	
1997	Adele Griffin	Sons of Liberty	Finalist	
1997	Brock Cole	The Facts Speak for Themselves	Finalist	
1997	Mary Ann McGuigan	Where You Belong	Finalist	
1998	Louis Sachar	Holes	Winner	
1998	Richard Peck	A Long Way from Chicago	Finalist	
1998	Jack Gantos	Joey Pigza Swallowed the Key	Finalist	
1998	Anita Lobel	No Pretty Pictures	Finalist	
1998	Ann Cameron	The Secret Life of Amanda K. Woods	Finalist	
1999	Kimberly Willis Holt	When Zachary Beaver Came to Town	Winner	
1999	Walter Dean Myers	Monster	Finalist	
1999	Laurie Halse Anderson	Speak	Finalist	
1999	Louise Erdrich	The Birchbark House	Finalist	
1999	Polly Horvath	The Trolls	Finalist	
2000	Gloria Whelan	Homeless Bird	Winner	
2000	Adam Bagdasarian	Forgotten Fire	Finalist	
2000	Jerry Stanley	Hurry Freedom: African Americans in Gold Rush California	Finalist	
2000	Carolyn Coman	Many Stones	Finalist	
2000	Michael Cadnum	The Book of the Lion	Finalist	
2001	Virginia Euwer Wolff	True Believer	Winner	
2001	Marilyn Nelson	Carver: A Life in Poems	Finalist	
2001	An Na	A Step From Heaven	Finalist	
2001	Kate DiCamillo	The Tiger Rising	Finalist	
2001	Phillip Hoose	We Were There Too! Young People in U.S. History	Finalist	
2002	Nancy Farmer	The House of the Scorpion	Winner	
2002	Naomi Shihab Nye	19 Varieties of Gazelle: Poems of the Middle East	Finalist	
2002	M. T. Anderson	Feed	Finalist	
2002	Jacqueline Woodson	Hush	Finalist	
2002	Elizabeth Partridge	This Land Was Made for You and Me: The Life and Songs of Woody Guthrie	Finalist	
2003	Polly Horvath	The Canning Season	Winner	
2003	Jim Murphy	An American Plague: The Time and Terrifying Story of the Yellow Fever Epidemic of 1793 (about the Yellow Fever Epidemic of 1793)	Finalist	
2003	Paul Fleischman	Breakout	Finalist	
2003	Jacqueline Woodson	Locomotion	Finalist	
2003	Richard Peck	The River Between Us	Finalist	
2004	Pete Hautman	Godless	Winner	
2004	Laban Carrick Hill	Harlem Stomp!: A Cultural History of the Harlem Renaissance (about the Harlem Renaissance)	Finalist	
2004	Deb Caletti	Honey, Baby, Sweetheart	Finalist	
2004	Julie Anne Peters	Luna: A Novel	Finalist	
2004	Shelia P. Moses	The Legend of Buddy Bush	Finalist	
2005	Jeanne Birdsall	The Penderwicks: A Summer Tale of Four Sisters, Two Rabbits, and a Very Interesting Boy	Winner	
2005	Walter Dean Myers	Autobiography of My Dead Brother	Finalist	
2005	Deborah Wiles	Each Little Bird That Sings	Finalist	
2005	Chris Lynch	Inexcusable	Finalist	
2005	Adele Griffin	Where I Want to Be	Finalist	
2006	M. T. Anderson	The Astonishing Life of Octavian Nothing, Traitor to the Nation, Volume I: The Pox Party	Winner	
2006	Gene Luen Yang	American Born Chinese	Finalist	
2006	Martine Leavitt	Keturah and Lord Death	Finalist	
2006	Patricia McCormick	Sold	Finalist	
2006	Nancy Werlin	The Rules of Survival	Finalist	
2007	Sherman Alexie	The Absolutely True Diary of a Part-Time Indian	Winner	
2007	Kathleen Duey	Skin Hunger: A Resurrection of Magic	Finalist	
2007	Sara Zarr	Story of a Girl	Finalist	
2007	Brian Selznick	The Invention of Hugo Cabret	Finalist	
2007	M. Sindy Felin	Touching Snow	Finalist	
2008	Judy Blundell	What I Saw and How I Lied	Winner	
2008	Laurie Halse Anderson	Chains	Finalist	
2008	E. Lockhart	The Disreputable History of Frankie Landau-Banks	Finalist	
2008	Tim Tharp	The Spectacular Now	Finalist	
2008	Kathi Appelt	The Underneath	Finalist	
2009	Phillip Hoose	Claudette Colvin: Twice Toward Justice	Winner	
2009	Deborah Heiligman	Charles and Emma: The Darwins' Leap of Faith	Finalist	
2009	Rita Williams-Garcia	Jumped	Finalist	
2009	Laini Taylor	Lips Touch, Three Times	Finalist	
2009	David Small	Stitches	Finalist	
2010	Kathryn Erskine	Mockingbird	Winner	
2010	Laura McNeal	Dark Water	Finalist	
2010	Walter Dean Myers	Lockdown	Finalist	
2010	Rita Williams-Garcia	One Crazy Summer	Finalist	
2010	Paolo Bacigalupi	Ship Breaker	Finalist	
2011	Thanhha Lai	Inside Out & Back Again	Winner	
2011	Franny Billingsley	Chime	Finalist	
2011	Albert Marrin	Flesh and Blood So Cheap: The Triangle Fire and Its Legacy (about the Triangle Shirtwaist Factory fire)	Finalist	
2011	Debby Dahl Edwardson	My Name Is Not Easy	Finalist	
2011	Gary Schmidt	Okay for Now	Finalist	
2012	William Alexander	Goblin Secrets	Winner	
2012	Steve Sheinkin	Bomb: The Race to Build―and Steal―the World's Most Dangerous Weapon	Finalist	
2012	Eliot Schrefer	Endangered	Finalist	
2012	Patricia McCormick	Never Fall Down	Finalist	
2012	Carrie Arcos	Out of Reach	Finalist	
2013	Cynthia Kadohata	The Thing About Luck	Winner	
2013	Gene Luen Yang	Boxers and Saints	Finalist	
2013	Tom McNeal	Far Far Away	Finalist	
2013	Meg Rosoff	Picture Me Gone	Finalist	
2013	Kathi Appelt	The True Blue Scouts of Sugar Man Swamp	Finalist	
2014	Jacqueline Woodson	Brown Girl Dreaming	Winner	
2014	John Corey Whaley	Noggin	Finalist	
2014	Deborah Wiles	Revolution	Finalist	
2014	Steve Sheinkin	The Port Chicago 50	Finalist	
2014	Eliot Schrefer	Threatened	Finalist	
2015	Neal Shusterman	Challenger Deep	Winner	
2015	Laura Ruby	Bone Gap	Finalist	
2015	Steve Sheinkin	Most Dangerous: Daniel Ellsberg and the Secret History of the Vietnam War	Finalist	
2015	ND Stevenson	Nimona	Finalist	
2015	Ali Benjamin	The Thing About Jellyfish	Finalist	
2016	John Lewis, Nate Powell, and Andrew Aydin	March: Book Three	Winner	
2016	Jason Reynolds	Ghost	Finalist	
2016	Kate DiCamillo	Raymie Nightingale	Finalist	
2016	Nicola Yoon	The Sun Is Also a Star	Finalist	
2016	Grace Lin	When the Sea Turned to Silver	Finalist	
2017	Robin Benway	Far from the Tree	Winner	
2017	Ibi Zoboi	American Street	Finalist	
2017	Rita Williams-Garcia	Clayton Byrd Goes Underground	Finalist	
2017	Erika L. Sánchez	I Am Not Your Perfect Mexican Daughter	Finalist	
2017	Elana K. Arnold	What Girls Are Made Of	Finalist	
2018	Elizabeth Acevedo	The Poet X	Winner	
2018	Jarrett J. Krosoczka	Hey, Kiddo	Finalist	
2018	M. T. Anderson and Eugene Yelchin	The Assassination of Brangwain Spurge	Finalist	
2018	Christopher Paul Curtis	The Journey of Little Charlie	Finalist	
2018	Leslie Connor	The Truth as Told by Mason Buttle	Finalist	
2019	Martin W. Sandler	1919: The Year That Changed America	Winner	
2019	Jason Reynolds	Look Both Ways: A Tale Told in Ten Blocks	Finalist	
2019	Randy Ribay	Patron Saints of Nothing	Finalist	
2019	Akwaeke Emezi	Pet	Finalist	
2019	Laura Ruby	Thirteen Doorways, Wolves Behind Them All	Finalist	
2020	Kacen Callender	King and the Dragonflies	Winner	
2020	Candice Iloh	Every Body Looking	Finalist	
2020	Gavriel Savit	The Way Back	Finalist	
2020	Traci Chee	We Are Not Free	Finalist	
2020	Victoria Jamieson and Omar Mohamed	When Stars Are Scattered	Finalist	
2021	Malinda Lo	Last Night at the Telegraph Club	Winner	
2021	Amber McBride	Me (Moth)	Finalist	
2021	Kekla Magoon	Revolution in Our Time: The Black Panther Party's Promise to the People	Finalist	
2021	Shing Yin Khor	The Legend of Auntie Po	Finalist	
2021	Kyle Lukoff	Too Bright to See	Finalist	
2022	Sabaa Tahir	All My Rage	Winner	
2022	Kelly Barnhill	The Ogress and the Orphans	Finalist	
2022	Sonora Reyes	The Lesbiana's Guide to Catholic School	Finalist	
2022	Tommie Smith, Derrick Barnes and Dawud Anyabwile	Victory. Stand!: Raising My Fist for Justice	Finalist	
2022	Lisa Yee	Maizy Chen's Last Chance	Finalist	
2023	Dan Santat	A First Time for Everything	Winner	
2023	Kenneth Cadow	Gather	Finalist	
2023	Huda Fahmy	Huda F Cares?	Finalist	
2023	Vashti Harrison	Big	Finalist	
2023	Katherine Marsh	The Lost Year: A Survival Story of the Ukrainian Famine	Finalist	
2024	Shifa Saltagi Safadi	Kareem Between	Winner	
2024	Violet Duncan	Buffalo Dreamer	Finalist	
2024	Josh Galarza	The Great Cool Ranch Dorito in the Sky	Finalist	
2024	Erin Entrada Kelly	The First State of Being	Finalist	
2024	Angela Shanté	The Unboxing of a Black Girl	Finalist	
2025	Daniel Nayeri	The Teacher of Nomad Land	Winner	
2025	Kyle Lukoff	A World Worth Saving	Finalist	
2025	Amber McBride	The Leaving Room	Finalist	
2025	Hannah V. Sawyerr	Truth Is	Finalist	
2025	Ibi Zoboi	(S)kin	Finalist	
2026	Gabriel Duckels & David Levithan	The Fight of Our Lives: AIDS in America	Winner	
2026	Elana K. Arnold	Holloway	Finalist	
2026	Tae Keller	When Tomorrow Burns	Finalist	
2026	Keala Kendall	That Which Feeds Us: A Hawaiian Gothic	Finalist	
2026	Julian Randall	Shook	Finalist	

== Authors with two awards ==
See Winners of multiple U.S. National Book Awards

Two authors have won two Children's or Young People's awards twice.

- Lloyd Alexander won for The Marvelous Misadventures of Sebastian (1971) and Westmark (1982), among six titles that were finalists.
- Katherine Paterson won for The Master Puppeteer (1977) and The Great Gilly Hopkins (1979), among three titles that were finalists.

Isaac Bashevis Singer won the Children's Literature award in 1970 for A Day of Pleasure: Stories of a Boy Growing up in Warsaw and shared the Fiction award in 1974 for A Crown of Feathers and Other Stories.

== See also ==
- List of winners of the National Book Award — all categories, winners only
