= Shine (Myracle novel) =

2011 book by Lauren Myracle

- Author: Lauren Myracle
- Language: English
- Publisher: Amulet Books
- Publication date: May 1, 2011
- Media type: Print (Hardback & e-book)
- Pages: 376 (first edition, hardback)
- ISBN: 0810984172 (first edition, hardback)

Shine is a 2011 young adult mystery novel by Lauren Myracle. The book was published on May 1, 2011, and follows a teenage girl investigating a hate crime involving the beating and near-death of her best friend in a small, North Carolina town. Shine won the 2012 Amelia Elizabeth Walden Award and is on the ALA's "YALSA Reader’s Choice" and "Top Ten Best Fiction for Young Adults" lists for 2012.

== Plot ==
In Black Creek, North Carolina, 16-year-old Cat Robinson's gay best friend, Patrick Truman, is left temporarily comatose from a brutal and discriminatory act of violence. Cat feels guilty for having become recently estranged from Patrick due to unrelated personal trauma, though she now vows to find his attacker, knowing the police will do little to help. Cat's own tortured past has caused her to withdraw from the world for three years, but she begins to return by taking the criminal investigation into her own hands. She starts by questioning members of her conservative Christian community, which is ravaged under the surface by a crippling culture of meth.

Cat confronts members of what she calls the "redneck posse", led by cocky, wealthy, homophobic Tommy Lawson. The posse also includes Cat's detached older brother, Christian, as well as Beef Pierson: an ex-athlete, high-school dropout, and long-time sympathizer with Cat's past struggles. Cat quickly uncovers several of the community's secrets: that Bailee-Ann, Beef's girlfriend, is cheating on him with Tommy and that Beef himself is a struggling meth addict; in fact, many of Cat's peers are also revealed to be former or continuing meth addicts and/or dealers. After a shallow talk with Bailee-Ann, Cat becomes doggedly followed by Bailee-Ann's foul-mouthed and neglected kid brother, Robert, who claims to be Beef's best friend and protégé.

While researching at a local library, Cat is viciously insulted by Jason Connor, a passing college boy whom she inadvertently offends and who, though from a poor background, pretends to be high-class. She soon learns that Jason is actually another distressed friend of Patrick, and she and Jason ultimately make up, become confidants and allies, and later even share romantic feelings. Meanwhile, a flashback reveals that Cat was sexually molested by Tommy three years ago, leading to an inability to continue maintaining relationships, thus naturally causing the deterioration of her friendship with Patrick. Convincing herself that Tommy must be Patrick's assailant, Cat confronts Tommy at last, only for him to apologize for his past wrongs, while sincerely affirming his innocence in the hate crime against Patrick.

Cat, with Jason's help, learns that Patrick has been maintaining a secret boyfriend, and they track the unknown lover to a gay bar, where Cat is astonished to realize that he is in fact Beef. Still-closeted, Beef, during a meth-fueled rage, apparently beat Patrick up and then framed the scene to look like a hate crime. The impulsive young Robert, who once admired Beef, now questions Beef's manliness as a gay man and threatens Beef's cover. Under the influence of meth once more, Beef consequently abducts Robert and takes him to a high cliff called Suicide Rock. Cat and Christian together pursue Beef, who threatens to push Robert from the summit of the cliff. Cat climbs the rock face, grabs Robert, and falls with him off the cliff, together safely landing in a swimming hole below. Christian and Beef then scuffle, and Beef slips off the cliff to his death. Afterward, at the hospital, Patrick finally awakens from his coma and is joyously greeted by Cat. The teenagers agree to pose Beef's death as an accident and to remain silent about his meth problem, in order to preserve his dignity in the community.

== Controversy ==
=== National Book Awards ===
In 2011 Shine was announced as a finalist in the National Book Award for Young People's Literature, with the National Book Foundation stating soon after that the nomination had been in error and that they had meant to announce that Franny Billingsley's similarly titled Chime was one of the finalists. The National Book Foundation requested that Myracle withdraw from the contest to "reserve the integrity of the award and the judges' work." Myracle expressed extreme disappointment at the mistake but requested that the National Book Foundation make a $5,000 donation to the Matthew Shepard Foundation, which they did.

=== Wall Street Journal criticism ===
In June 2011 Wall Street Journal critic Meghan Cox Gurdon cited Shine as an example of the prevalence of dark themes in young adult literature. Gurdon criticized the language in the novel and compared it to novels by Judy Blume, saying that while it was "probably apt" for the characters in the book, she wasn't sure that it was language that parents might want their children to read. Gurdon's article was met with criticism by many. Myracle initially responded by calling the article "idiocy, to be blunt" but later issued an apology to Gurdon.

== Reception ==
Shine was met with mixed reviews.

Booklist praised the book, saying it "provides a lot to think about." Kirkus Reviews called the book "[r]aw, realistic and compelling." School Library Journal wrote, “Myracle captures well the regret that many feel for things in their past about which they are ashamed.”

The Los Angeles Times said the book was "heavy-handed" but "otherwise intelligent and emotionally evolved."

Andover Townsman provided a mostly negative review, giving the book "only four out of 10 stars." They referred to the writing in some sections as "particularly powerful" but noted that the book "does not seem to have many other redeeming qualities." They explained their opinion saying, "[M]any elements of the novel ... do not make sense, or ... seem to miss something," including character development. Importantly, Andover Townsman found the surprise ending lacking and somewhat nonsensical, "which makes the novel seem hastily concluded."

=== Awards and honors ===
Year	Award	Result	Ref.
2012	Amelia Elizabeth Walden Award	Winner	
2012	Best Fiction for Young Adults	Top 10	
2012	Readers' Choice for Realistic Fiction	Selection	
2012	Teens' Top Ten	Nominee	
2014	Popular Paperbacks for Young Adults	Selection	

=== Censorship ===
In 2022, three of Myracle's novels (ttyl, ttfn, and Shine) were listed among 52 books banned by the Alpine School District following the implementation of Utah law H.B. 374, “Sensitive Materials In Schools," 42removed books “feature LBGTQ+ characters and or themes.” Many of the books were removed because they were considered to contain pornographic material according to the new law, which defines porn using the following criteria:

- "The average person" would find that the material, on the whole, "appeals to prurient interest in sex"
- The material "is patently offensive in the description or depiction of nudity, sexual conduct, sexual excitement, sadomasochistic abuse, or excretion"
- The material, on the whole, "does not have serious literary, artistic, political or scientific value."
