= Willian Santiago =

Brazilian illustrator (1991–2021)

- Born: 1991; Cornélio Procópio, Paraná, Brazil
- Died: 4 May 2021 (aged 29–30); Londrina, Paraná, Brazil
- Occupation(s): Illustrator, graphic designer, and professor
- Years active: 2014–2021

Willian Santiago (1991 – 4 May 2021) was a Brazilian illustrator, graphic designer, and professor, known internationally for his works full of vibrant colors and digital reproduction of brushstrokes and natural textures, having illustrated several books, in Brazil and abroad, in addition to magazines and advertising campaigns of famous brands.

In 2017, Santiago won the Prêmio Jabuti, in the digital children's category, for the illustrations of the first children's book by author Luis Fernando Veríssimo, called O Sétimo Gato, which was part of the Kidsbook Itaú Criança Collection.

== Biography ==
Born in Cornélio Procópio, Paraná, Santiago graduated from the State University of Londrina (UEL), and started working initially with branding focused on fashion. He had always loved drawing, but only with the advent of the internet was he able to establish himself as an illustrator.

In 2014, when he opened his own illustration studio, he started collaborating with big names like Itaú, Natura, Sesc, Nestlé, Farm, L'Occitane, Havaianas, among others. Combining high-contrast colors and striking features, Santiago also had works published abroad, such as in England, where he partnered with publishers, such as the cover of the book Mockingbird, written by Kathryn Erskine in 2010, and in Germany, where he made the cover of the magazine Friday Magazin, in addition to France, South Africa, Italy, the United States, South Korea, among others.

Among Santiago's main works are the cover of the novel A Visão das Plantas, by Angolan writer Djaimilia Pereira de Almeida, in addition to the book for which he won the Prêmio Jabuti Award in 2017, in the digital children's category, with his illustrations in the first book children's book by author Luis Fernando Veríssimo, called O Sétimo Gato, which was part of the Kidsbook Itaú Criança Collection.

Success, however, never prevented him from continuing to be humble and generous when sharing his knowledge and valuable tips with other young illustrators, or referring without prejudice to his greatest influences. One of these references was Heitor dos Prazeres, born in 1898, very close to samba and who, as an illustrator, painted the bohemia of the city of Rio de Janeiro and life in his community, in a naïf style, full of colors, something that Santiago also embraced his works and his life.

== Death ==
Santiago died of complications from COVID-19 on 4 May 2021, at the age of 30, after spending about a month in an ICU of a private hospital in the city of Londrina, Paraná.
