= Abyssinia (1987 musical) =

- The Musical
- Goodspeed 2005 production poster
- Music: Ted Kociolek
- Lyrics: James Racheff
- Book: James Racheff; Ted Kociolek
- Basis: Marked by Fire by Joyce Carol Thomas
- Productions: 1987 Musical Theater Works; 1987 Goodspeed Musicals; 1988 Goodspeed Musicals; 1990 Cleveland Play House 1995 North Shore Music Theatre; 2005 North Shore Music Theatre; 2005 Goodspeed Musicals

Abyssinia is a musical with music by Ted Kociolek, lyrics by James Racheff, and a book by both Racheff and Kociolek, based on the novel Marked by Fire, by Joyce Carol Thomas.

== Productions ==
Abyssinia was first produced in 1987 by Musical Theater Works at the CSC Repertory Theater. It was directed by Tazewell Thompson. The scenery consultant was Evelyn Sakash, the lighting consultant was Clarke W. Thornton, the costume consultant was Amanda Klein, musical supervision and choral arrangements were by Daryl Waters, and the choreography consultant was Julie Arenal. The same year, the musical was produced by CSC Repertory Theater in New York, directed by Tazewell Thompson.

The North Shore Music Theatre produced Abyssinia twice, once in 1995 and once in 2005. It also sponsored a reading in 1994 at the National Alliance for Musical Theatre's New Works Festival. The 2005 production ran at the Shubert Theater in Boston, Massachusetts. It was directed by Stafford Arima and choreographed by Todd L. Underwood, with music direction by Michael O’Flaherty, lighting design by Kirk Bookman, and costumes by Pamela Scofield.

Abyssinia has also been presented three times by Goodspeed Musicals, Connecticut, in 1987 and 1988 at the Norma Terris Theater and in 2005 at the Goodspeed Opera House, directed by Stafford Arima and choreographed by Todd L. Underwood. The Cleveland Play House produced Abyssinia in the spring of 1991.

== Characters ==
- Mother Vera - Abby's godmother, a folk healer
- Abyssinia "Abby" Jackson - A sixteen-year-old girl, a praise singer
- Patience Jackson - Abby's mother, a seamstress
- Lucas Jackson - Abby's father, a farmer
- Trembling Sally - Abby's nemesis, lives in the woods like a wild thing
- Lily Noreen Lewis - Abby's best friend
- Minister - Pastor of the Stillwater Solid Rock Baptist Church
- Corine - Elder of the church, laundress
- Mavis - Elder of the church, Corine's sister, laundress
- Selma - Elder of the church, their cousin, a spinster
- Mother Samuels - A frail, elderly woman
- Brother Samuels - Deacon of the church, field foreman
- Marcus, Jesse and Leon - Ponca City Boys

(Marcus, Jesse and Leon double as members of the congregation.)

(Lily Noreen Lewis doubles as Mother Samuels.)

== Synopsis ==
Abyssinia Jackson is born during a tornado in Stillwater, Oklahoma at the turn of the 20th century. Blessed with a gift of song and a voice that thrills and delights the entire community, Abby is brought up in the bosom of the church and under the watchful eye of Mother Vera, a folk-healer. Trembling Sally, whose children were destroyed by the same storm in which Abyssinia was born, hears Abby sing and begins to torment the young girl by challenging her beliefs.

Like Job, Abby is fated to undergo a series of trials. Consequently, Abby's faith in both man and God is destroyed and she vows never to sing again.

Abyssinia's withdrawal affects the devastated community like a long drought while Trembling Sally continues to tempt her with dark thoughts. Finally, Mother Vera takes the girl under her wing to teach her the ways of a healer. In learning to relieve pain in others, Abyssinia begins to heal herself. At the play's conclusion, Abyssinia finds her voice again, overcomes Trembling Sally and rejoins the community.
