= Hà =

Hà is a Vietnamese given name, male or female, meaning "river".

Hà is a Vietnamese 'surname' (during French colonialism). The name is transliterated as He in Chinese and Ha in Korean.

Ha is the anglicized variation of the surname Hà. It is also the anglicized variation of Hạ.

== Notable people with the surname Hà ==
- Hà Kiều Anh (born 1977), Miss Vietnam in 1992
- Hà Huy Tập (1906–1941), General Secretary of Communist Party of Vietnam
- Hà Văn Lâu, diplomatist
- Hà Anh Tuấn (born 1984), Vietnamese singer
- Hà Nguyễn William, Associate professor of endodontics and app developer

== See also ==
- Kim Hà, main character in Thanhha Lai book Inside Out & Back Again
