= A Place Apart =

A Place Apart may refer to:

- A Place Apart (Murphy book), a 1978 non-fiction book by Dervla Murphy
- A Place Apart (Fox novel), a 1980 children's novel by Paula Fox
