= Edwardson =

Origin
- Origin: English
- Meaning: "son of Edward"
- Region of origin: England; Scotland; Scandinavia

Other names
- Variant form: Edwards

Edwardson is an English language patronymic surname derived from the given name Edward. The surname is rare in the United Kingdom, especially when compared to equivalent patronymics such as Williamson or Thompson. The short equivalent, Edwards, is common - it has not been established why Edwardson is comparatively rare, though there has been speculation.

In English historical records, the name appears most commonly in Lancashire and neighbouring parts of Cheshire, suggesting possible origins in that area. In Scotland, historically the Edwardson name appears most common on the Shetland Islands, specifically Unst. The name also appears in Scandinavia, where it is also rare. The surname likely arose independently in each area. However, it is probable that in each case it appeared due to the influence of Scandinavian patronymic naming traditions.

The earliest mentions of the name come from English Medieval muster rolls. A 'Warin Edwardessone' of 'Altryncham' is listed as a bodyguard to King Richard II in 1398. Two Edwardsons are listed as Archers serving in France during the 1400s, in the latter stages of the Hundred Years War.

Today there are many Edwardsons living in North America and Australasia. They can likely trace their descent to British or Scandinavian migration.

There are variations with the same meaning, including the much more common Edwards, and the Scandinavian Edwardsen.

The Edwardson History Society, launched in 2025, is dedicated to researching the history of the surname and its bearers.

Notable people with the name Edwardson include:

- Åke Edwardson (born 1953), Swedish author
- Dave Edwardson, American musician
- Jeremy Edwardson, American musician
- Debby Dahl Edwardson, American novelist
- Captain William Lawrence Edwardson, British sailor who gives his name to Moana-whenua-pōuri / Edwardson Sound in New Zealand

== See also ==
- Cordelia Edvardson, Swedish journalist and author
