= The Court of the Stone Children =

1973 children's book by Eleanor Cameron

- Author: Eleanor Cameron
- Cover artist: Trina Schart Hyman
- Language: English
- Genre: Children's literature Children's fantasy Supernatural fiction
- Publisher: E. P. Dutton
- Publication date: 1973
- Publication place: United States
- Pages: 191

The Court of the Stone Children is a 1973 children's fantasy book written by Eleanor Cameron. While exploring a museum in San Francisco, lonely young girl Nina visits a French château exhibit. There she meets Dominique, the ghost of a young girl from the Napoleonic era who lived in the château. Dominique's father believes Nina can help clear his name, as he was executed for treason, and Dominique tasks Nina with proving her father's innocence.

== Reception ==
The book won the 1974 National Book Award for Children's Books. Barbara Wersba's review in the New York Times called it "not just a fine book but a brilliant one", and The Boston Globe said it was "a winning fantasy".
