= The Night Swimmers =

1982 children's book by Betsy Byars

- Author: Betsy Byars
- Illustrator: Troy Howell
- Language: English
- Genre: Children's literature
- Publisher: Delacorte Press
- Publication date: April 30, 1980
- Publication place: United States
- Pages: 131
- Awards: National Book Award for Young People's Literature (1981)
- ISBN: 0174324308

The Night Swimmers is a 1980 children's novel written by American author Betsy Byars and illustrated by Troy Howell. The novel follows 12-year-old Retta, who cares for her siblings after her mother dies, while their father attempts to succeed as a country singer. At night, the children sneak into their neighbor's pool.

The Night Swimmers won the 1981 National Book Award for Young People's Literature.

== Plot summary ==
After their mother dies in a plane crash, 12-year-old Retta assumes the parenting responsibilities for her younger brothers, Johnny and Roy, as their neglectful father, Shorty, works nights trying to make it as a country singer. While their father is at work, Retta sneaks her brothers to swim in their neighbor's pool. One night, while Retta is trailing Johnny and a friend, Roy almost drowns in the pool, but is rescued by their neighbor, who contacts Shorty, leading to a confrontation. The children learn that Shorty and Brendelie, Shorty's girlfriend, are going to get married, and Retta is relieved that she won't have to mother her siblings any longer.

== Reception ==
The book won the National Book Award for Young People's Literature in the hardcover fiction category in 1981, Byars' first win after having been a finalist in 1973 for The House of Wings. Kirkus Reviews called the book "a solidly realized story" and "acutely perceptive and crystal clear".
