= The Marvelous Misadventures of Sebastian =

Children's picaresque fantasy novel by Lloyd Alexander

- Author: Lloyd Alexander
- Language: English
- Genre: Children's literature Fantasy; Picaresque
- Publisher: E. P. Dutton
- Publication date: September 25, 1970
- Publication place: United States
- Pages: 244
- ISBN: 0440405491

The Marvelous Misadventures of Sebastian is a 1970 children's novel by Lloyd Alexander. Sebastian is a fiddler in Baron Purn-Hessel's orchestra until he is fired for seemingly mocking a government official, forcing him to wander the medieval countryside with only his fiddle for company. He is soon joined by Presto the cat, villager Nicolas, Princess Isabel, and a mysterious magic fiddle which seems to offer musical talent in exchange for the player's soul. The book won the National Book Award for Young People's Literature in 1971 and was an American Library Association notable book in 1970.
