= Tunes for a Small Harmonica =

1976 novel by Barbara Wersba

- First edition
- Author: Barbara Wersba
- Language: English
- Genre: novel
- Publisher: Harper and Row
- Publication date: 1976
- Publication place: United States
- Media type: Print (hardback)
- Pages: 173
- ISBN: 0-06-026373-3
- OCLC: 2224740
- LC Class: PZ7.W473 Tu

Tunes for a Small Harmonica is a novel by Barbara Wersba about an adolescent tomboy named J.F. McAllister. It was originally published by Dell Publishing but was then reprinted by Harper and Row publishing. It was a finalist for the 1977 National Book Award for Young People's Literature. The novel has been translated into Catalan, Dutch, German, Japanese, Korean, and Spanish.

== Plot ==
J.F. receives a harmonica from friend for her birthday and ends up learning to play it. She becomes quite good and this skill becomes useful after she ends up falling in love with her poetry teacher. She then attempts to raise $1000 to help her teacher return to England to finish his Master's thesis.
