= Ouida Sebestyen =

American children's author (1924–2007)

Ouida Sebestyen (February 13, 1924 – April 28, 2007) was an American author of young adult literature. Her first published novel Words by Heart (1979), about an African American family in Texas in 1910, was a finalist for the National Book Award for Young People's Literature in 1980 (as a hard cover) and a winner in 1982 (as a paperback). She went on to publish more than a dozen more books, and was again a finalist for the National Book Award in 1981 for her novel Far from Home.

== Early life and career ==
Ouida Sebestyen was born Ouida Dockery on February 13, 1924, in Vernon, Texas. She was the daughter of a schoolteacher father, and a mother whose stories about childhood in rural Texas provided inspiration for some of Sebestyen's future novel, including Words by Heart. Sebestyen wanted to become an author from an early age, and at age six she adapted a story into a play that was performed by children in her neighborhood.

At age 20, Sebestyen first submitted a novel manuscript to a publisher and it was rejected, as were her subsequent manuscripts until Words by Heart was published 35 years later. As a young woman she moved to Boulder, Colorado, where she briefly attended the University of Colorado before dropping out to repair airplanes during World War II. In 1960, she married Adam Sebestyen, and they divorced in 1966. The couple had a son named Corbin, whom Sebestyen raised in Boulder as a single mother. Money was tight, so Sebestyen used her mother's social security check for rent while working in housekeeping and other odd jobs, including trimming hedges. She continued to write, and though she was sometimes successful, she made unsuccessful attempts to publish four novels and more than fifty short stories before Words by Heart was released in 1979.

== Publishing career ==
In 1979, Ouida Sebestyen published her first book: Words by Heart was a young adult novel about an African American girl named Lena Sills. Set in 1910 Texas, the plot focused on Lena's attempts to impress her father and her white classmates with her performance in a contest to recite Bible scripture. It was published by Atlantic/Little, Brown, after part of the book first appeared as a short story in the magazine Ingenue in 1968. Words by Heart was named a Best Book of 1979 by The New York Times and School Library Journal, and was a National Book Award for Young People's Literature finalist as a hardcover in 1980, and a winner of the prize as a paperback in 1982.

Sebestyen then published Far from Home in 1980, another historical fiction novel for young adults, which was a National Book Award finalist in 1981. She continued to write additional novels for young adults, including The Girl in the Box (1988).

Her papers are stored at the University of Minnesota Libraries.
