= Edwin Tunis =

American painter

Edwin Burdette Tunis (1897–1973) was an American painter, mural artist, book illustrator, radio announcer, actor, theater set designer and author.

As a children's writer, Tunis earned a Newbery Honor in 1962 for his book Frontier Living, and was a finalist for National Book Award for Young People's Literature in 1971 for The Young United States, 1783–1830. He also won the Thomas A. Edison Foundation Children's Book Award for special excellence in portraying America's past.

He wrote and illustrated several books, including: Oars, Sails, and Steam: A Picture Book of Ships; Weapons; Wheels; Colonial Living; and Indians.

== Early life ==
Tunis was born in Cold Spring Harbor, New York, on December 8, 1897. He grew up moving a lot because his father's job was installing steam engines at factories all over the country.

As an adult he lived most of his life in Maryland.

== Works ==
His books include:

- Oars, Sails & Steam: A Picture Book of Ships (1952)
- Weapons: A Pictorial History (1954)
- Wheels: A Pictorial History (1955, repr 1977)
- Indians: A Pictorial Recreation of American Indian Life Before the Arrival of the White Man (1959)
- Frontier Living (1961)
- Shaw's Fortune: The Picture Story of a Colonial Plantation (1966)
- Chipmunks on the Doorstep (1971)
- The Tavern at the Ferry (1973)
- Colonial Craftsmen and the Beginnings of American Industry (1976)
- The Young United States, 1783-1830: A Time of Change and Growth, a Time of Learning Democracy, a Time of New Ways of Living, Thinking, and Doing (1976)
- Colonial Living (1964, revised ed 1999)
