= Chime (novel) =

2011 young adult fantasy novel by Franny Billingsley

- Cover for the first edition hardcover
- Author: Franny Billingsley
- Language: English
- Publisher: Dial
- Publication date: March 17, 2011
- Media type: Print (Hardback & e-book)
- Pages: 368 pp (first edition, hardback)
- ISBN: 0803735529 (first edition, hardback)

Chime is a 2011 young adult fantasy novel by Franny Billingsley. The book was published by Dial on March 17, 2011. Chime was selected as a finalist in the 2011 National Book Award for Young People's Literature. The book was also selected as one of Publisher Weekly's Best Books of 2011 and was one of the American Library Association's 2012 Best Fiction picks for both the audiobook and hardback.

== Synopsis ==
Chime is narrated by Briony Larkin, a young woman growing up in the small town of Swampsea. For years she has hidden two secrets: that she is a witch with the second sight and that her powers have caused harm to many people, including her twin sister Rose and her stepmother. While they were children, Briony grew jealous of the sudden amount of attention that their stepmother was paying to Rose and caused Rose to fall off of a swing set. The fall left Rose brain damaged and unable to live as she would have otherwise. Briony feels extreme guilt and self-hatred over the accident, which is further exacerbated by Briony blaming herself for the death of her stepmother, who is believed to have died by suicide by arsenic poisoning. That the Old Ones, the supernatural beings in the nearby swamp, are constantly begging her to write stories about them in order to ensure that they are remembered only adds to her stress. She used to write constantly, only for all her writing to be burned when she set fire to her house's library.

Briony learns that the swamp is to be drained, which has prompted the Boggy Mun, the strongest of the Old Ones, to unleash a sickness over the town. Despite wanting to remain alone to ensure that she does not harm anyone else, Briony begins to fall for Eldric, whose father is responsible for the swamp draining. She manages to temporarily stall the draining by way of sabotaging the machine that would drain the swamp, but must discover a way to convince the townspeople that the swamp cough is the result of the Boggy Mun attempting to defend his home and that the project must stop. During this time Briony spends much of her time with Eldric, but also fends off the advances of Cecil, the son of the local Judge. When the beautiful Leanne arrives in town, Briony takes an instant disliking to her especially when she begins to steal away Eldric's attention.

Briony eventually manages to convince the townspeople of the swamp cough's origins and stops the swamp from being drained by helping the spirits of the dead children of the townspeople communicate with their parents. This also leads to her stepmother's spirit emerging from her grave and publicly accusing Briony of her murder. Briony is charged with the crime of being responsible for her stepmother's death via witchcraft, but it soon becomes apparent that stepmother was an evil Dark Muse, draining the life force out of Briony and Rose by way of their creativity. During the trial it is revealed Rose never fell from the swing and is thus not actually brain damaged, and that the stepmother was just gaslighting her. Briony also begins to remember that although she was responsible for poisoning her stepmother and setting the library fire, this was done in an attempt to keep Rose from dying from their stepmother's powers. As it is not illegal to kill Dark Muses and the death was in self-defense, Briony is cleared of the charges of witchcraft. It is also revealed that Briony was born in the time between day and night, between the first and the last chime of midnight, making her a "chime child". It is therefore explained that any powers she had were a result of being a chime child, which is considered to be a good thing.

After she leaves the court, Briony is then approached by Leanne, who is also revealed to be a Dark Muse. Eldric has deduced her true nature and refused her company, so she is withering away and dying. Briony does not kill Leanne, but walks away from her because Leanne is incapable of siphoning creativity from any other person than Eldric. The book ends with Briony and Eldric ending up together and living peacefully with Rose, but with Briony fully aware that the pause of the swamp draining is only temporary and that eventually man will find a way to not only prevent the swamp cough but also drain the swamp. Because of this, Briony agrees to begin writing again in order to record the Old Ones' stories to prevent them from ever being truly forgotten.

== Reception and awards ==
Critical reception for Chime has been mostly positive. The Seattle PI praised Billingsley's writing while observing that Briony's self-hatred made it hard to like her. Strange Horizons also cited Billingsley's writing as a highlight, comparing Briony to the character of Sophie from Howl's Moving Castle.

Chime was selected as a finalist in the 2011 National Book Award for Young People's Literature. It was part of a mixup along with Lauren Myracle's Shine, which had been temporarily listed as a finalist due to the similarity of the titles' names.
