= Forgotten Fire =

2002 young adult novel by Adam Bagdasarian

- Author: Adam Bagdasarian
- Genre: Young adult novel
- Publisher: Laurel Leaf Library
- Publication date: April 9, 2002
- Publication place: United States
- ISBN: 9780440229179

Forgotten Fire (2002) is a young adult novel by Adam Bagdasarian. The book is based on a true story and follows the young boy Vahan Kenderian through the Armenian genocide of 1915 to 1923. It became a National Book Award finalist, National Book Award for Young People's Literature honor, and the IRA Children's Literature and Reading Notable Book for a Global Society.

== Plot summary ==
In 1915, Vahan Kenderian is living a life of privilege as the youngest son of a wealthy Armenian family in Turkey. This secure world is shattered when some family members are whisked away while others are murdered before his eyes.

Vahan loses his home and family, and is forced to live a life he would never have dreamed of in order to survive. Somehow Vahan's strength and spirit help him endure, even knowing that each day could be his last.

== Characters ==
Vahan Kenderian- the protagonist of the story. Throughout the novel, Vahan goes through many difficult experiences before reaching the final destination Constantinople and relative safety. He runs away from Turkish soldiers, fakes deafness, and experiences family deaths. Growing up in wealth, Vahan's life undergoes massive change as the text progresses. After the forced separation or murder of those closest to him, the brutality facing Armenians proceeded to wipe out or estrange any possibility for connection going forwards. Despite this, he continues to find help and community in various figurest throughout the course of Forgotten Fire.

- Sisak Kenderian - Vahan's older brother who he runs away with during the death march post Goryan's Inn. He later dies due to an unnamed illness as Vahan attempts to nurse him back to health.
- Armenouhi Kenderian - Vahan's older sister who takes poison to avoid the possibility of rape at the Goryan's Inn.
- Oskina Kenderian - Vahan's oldest sister who he becomes separated from but eventually reunites with.
- Mumpreh Kenderian - Vahan's uncle who was accused of being a revolutionary and disappeared from the household soon after being returned.
- Selim Bey - The "Butcher of Armenians." Governor of Van and responsible for the deaths of the thousands of Armenians. Vahan stays with him for various months, as Bey stays in his childhood home and Vahan cleans the adjacent stable.
- Diran Kenderian - Vahan's older brother who is killed by Turkish soldiers very early in the book.
- Sarkis Kenderian - Vahan's father who is taken before the rest of the family and perishes in an unknown way.
- Meera Kenderian - Vahan's mother who encourages him and Sisak to run, dying of Cholera five days later.
- Toumia Kenderian - Vahan's grandmother who is killed beside the Tigris River.
- Tavel Kenderian- Vahan's other older brother who Turkish soldiers kill before they are taken to the Inn.
- Pattoo - Vahan's friend from grade school, whom he stays with for a brief time on two separate occasions.

== Reception ==
Forgotten Fire received favorable reviews from Kirkus Reviews, Publishers Weekly, and Booklist. The book received the following accolades:

- National Book Awards for Young People's Literature Finalist (2000)
- American Library Association Top Ten Best Books for Young Adults (2001)
- Popular Paperbacks for Young Adults (2003)
- Outstanding Books for the College Bound and Lifelong Learners (2009)
- IRA Children's Literature and Reading Notable Book for a Global Society
