= A Penguin Year =

1981 children's non-fiction book by Susan Bonners

- Author: Susan Bonners
- Illustrator: Susan Bonners
- Cover artist: Susan Bonners
- Language: English
- Genre: Children's literature Children's non-fiction literature
- Publisher: Delacorte Publishing
- Publication date: 1981
- Publication place: United States
- Pages: 44
- ISBN: 0440001668

A Penguin Year is a 1981 children's non-fiction book written and illustrated by Susan Bonners. The book covers one year in the lives of Adélie penguins in Antarctica. The book won the National Book Award for Young People's Literature in the non-fiction category in 1982.

== Plot summary ==
The story begins with the penguins' return to their rookeries during austral winter. Brush-tail, a male, and Scarred-wing, a female, perform a successful mating dance. The two penguins construct a nest of pebbles and Scarred-wing lays two eggs in it before returning to the ocean to feed, leaving Brush-tail to incubate the eggs.

After a few weeks, she has fattened up, and returns to the nest and swaps with Brush-tail, who departs to the ocean to hunt. Their chick hatches in December, and Scarred-wing feeds it with krill from her crop. As the chick ages, it demands more food, requiring the parents to make more trips to the ocean to fish. Skua and the fighting of other penguins makes life dangerous for the penguin chicks, so they gather together in a crèche for safety.

At 8 weeks old, the chicks are large enough to not fear the skuas and are three-quarters grown. Brush-tail and Scarred-wing head back to the ocean, leaving their chick to fend for itself. Eventually, as summer approaches, all the chicks in the rookery gather at the ice edge for their first swim in the ocean. As they dive in, some are eaten by leopard seals but most survive to return to the rookery the next year.
