= Oh, Boy! Babies =

1980 children's book by Alison Cragin Herzig and Jane Lawrence Mali

Oh, Boy! Babies!
- Author: Alison Cragin Herzig; Jane Lawrence Mali
- Language: English
- Genre: Children's non-fiction literature Child care
- Publication date: 1980
- Publication place: United States
- Media type: Hardback
- Pages: 106
- ISBN: 9780316358972

Oh, Boy! Babies! is a 1980 children's non-fiction child care photo book written by Alison Cragin Herzig and Jane Lawrence Mali and photographed by Katrina Thomas. The book follows a group of 5th and 6th grade boys enrolled in an infant care-taking class designed to teach bathing, clothing, diaper-changing, and feeding. The book was adapted into a half-hour TV special which aired on NBC in 1982.

== Reception ==
The book won the 1981 National Book Award for Young People's Literature in the nonfiction hardcover category.
