= When Zachary Beaver Came to Town (novel) =

1999 novel by Kimberly Willis Holt

When Zachary Beaver Came to Town by Kimberly Willis Holt is a young adult novel published on October 15, 1999 by Henry Holt and Company.

The story focuses on Toby, who lives in a small town in Texas and is facing many life changes. He's not handling the changes well until Zachary Beaver, "the fattest boy in the world," comes into the town with the circus.

== Reception ==
When Zachary Beaver Came to Town received many accolades:

- 1999, National Book Award for Young People's Literature
- 2000, American Library Association (ALA), Best Books for Young Adults
- 2000, ALA Notable Children's Books
- 2001, Dorothy Canfield Fisher Children's Book Award nominee

== Movie Adaption ==
The movie adaptation of When Zachary Beaver Came to Town was released in 2003. John Schultz directed and wrote the screenplay. The film won the Crystal Heart Award at the Heartland International Film Festival in 2004 and was nominated for the Artios award for the Best Independent Feature Film Casting from the Casting Society of America.
