= Huda Fahmy =

American graphic novelist

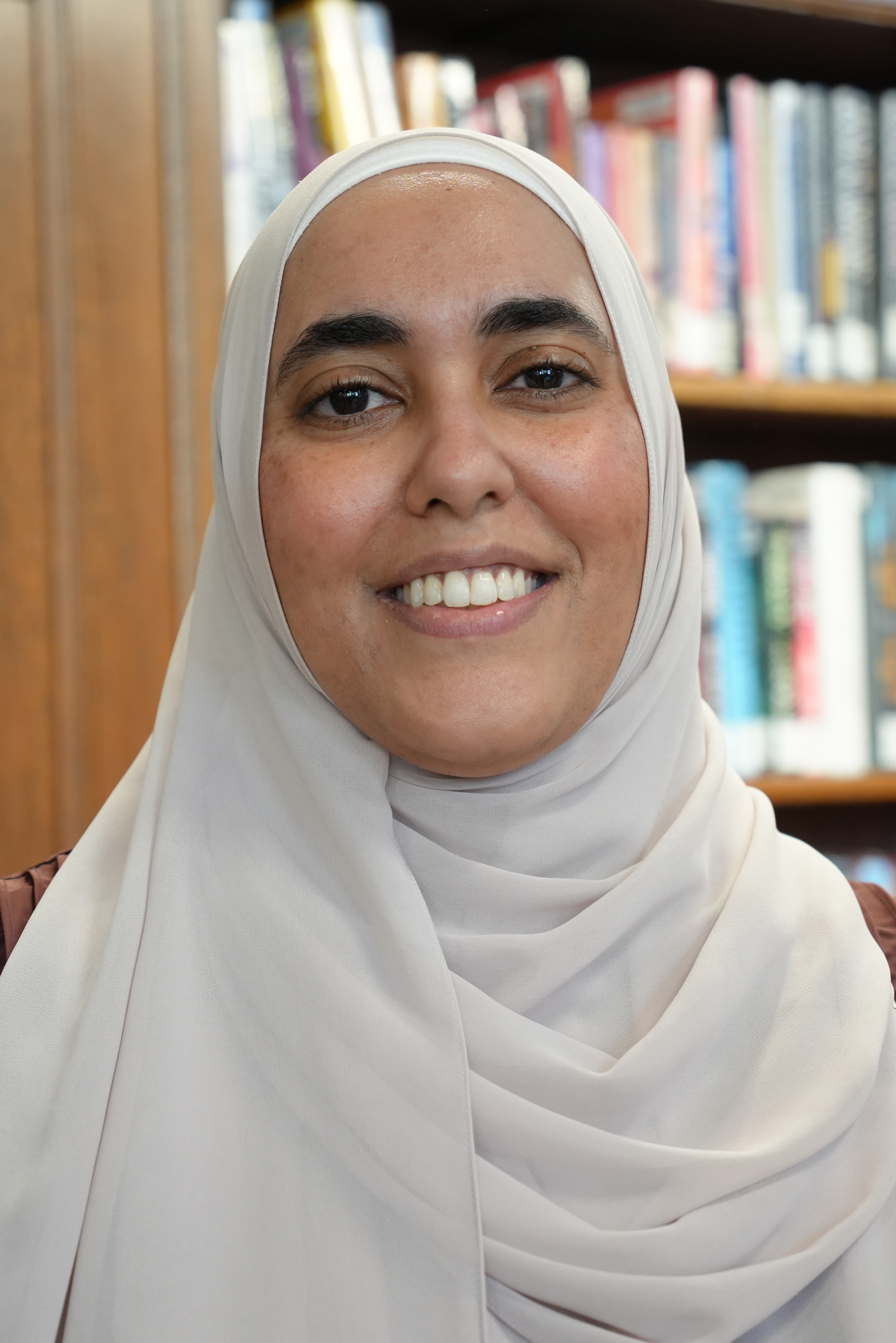
- Fahmy at Bay Area Book Festival 2025
- Education: University of Michigan–Dearborn (2006)
- Occupation: Graphic novelist
- Writing career
- Notable works: Huda F Are You? (2021); Huda F Cares? (2023); Huda F Wants to Know? (2024)

Huda Fahmy (born c. 1985) is an American graphic novelist. Her novel Huda F Cares? was a finalist for the 2023 National Book Award for Young People's Literature.

== Early life ==
Fahmy grew up in Dearborn, Michigan and has four sisters. Her father immigrated to the United States from Egypt, and her mother immigrated from Syria. Though both of her parents spoke English, they spoke Arabic at home. Fahmy has indicated that she learned how to read English from Sunday comic strips.

In 2006, Fahmy graduated from the University of Michigan–Dearborn, where she studied English.

== Career ==
Fahmy taught English studies at the middle and high school level for eight years.

In 2016, Fahmy left teaching to care for her first son. Following the election of President Donald Trump, she began writing a collection of essays about her experiences as a Muslim Arab-American woman in the United States and shared them with literary agents in hopes of publishing. After several rejections, her sister encouraged her to turn the essays into comics. She shared the comics Instagram under the handle Yes, I'm Hot in This, a joke following people's question of whether she was hot wearing her hijab. A collection of the comics were published by Adams Media under the title Yes, I'm Hot in This.

Fahmy's next graphic novel, That Can Be Arranged, was also geared toward adults and was published in 2020 by Andrews McMeel Publishing. She then published two graphic novels for young adults with Dial Books: Huda F Are You? (2021) and Huda F Cares? (2023). She has described both as "fictionalized memoir".

== Awards ==
Huda F Are You? and Huda F Cares? are Junior Library Guild selections.

Awards for Fahmy's writing
Year	Title	Award	Result	Ref.
2022	Huda F Are You?	Goodreads Choice Award for Graphic Novels & Comics	Nominee	
2023	Huda F Cares?	National Book Award for Young People's Literature	Finalist	

== Personal life ==
Fahmy is Egyptian-American and Muslim.

As of 2023, Fahmy lived with her husband and children in Houston.

== Publications ==
- Yes, I'm Hot in This: The Hilarious Truth about Life in a Hijab. Adams Media. 2018. ISBN 9781507209349.
- That Can Be Arranged: A Muslim Love Story. Andrews McMeel Publishing. 2020. ISBN 9781524856229.
- Huda F Are You?. Dial Books. 2021. ISBN 9780593324318.
- Huda F Cares?. Dial Books. 2023. ISBN 9780593532805.
- Huda F Wants to Know? Dial Books. 2024. ISBN 978-0-593-85561-4
- Fahmy, Huda; Chen, Weinye (20 October 2026). Huda F would love you?. New York: Dial Books for Young Readers. ISBN 9780593855669.
