= Huda F Are You? =

2021 graphic novel by Huda Fahmy

- Author: Huda Fahmy
- Genre: Young adult graphic novel
- Publisher: Dial Books
- Publication date: November 23, 2021
- Pages: 192
- ISBN: 9780593324318
- Followed by: Huda F Cares?

Huda F Are You? is a 2021 young adult graphic novel by American author Huda Fahmy. Considered a fictionalized memoir, the novel follows Huda through her first year of high school in a new town, where she must re-examine her identity.

== Plot ==
Huda F Are You?, a fictionalized memoir, follows Huda, an Egyptian-American teenager who has recently moved to Dearborn, Michigan with her parents and four sisters. In this new environment, she discovers that wearing a hijab does not make her stand out among her peers, prompting her to navigate the complexities of forming her own identity distinct from her religious beliefs. Along the way, Huda confronts both overt and subtle forms of Islamophobia and xenophobia from classmates and a teacher, as well as struggles with internalized Islamophobia and self-doubt. The narrative explores her dilemma of whether to speak out against the discrimination she faces or to continue being a people-pleaser.

== Reception ==
Huda F Are You? was well received by critics.

Kirkus Reviews referred to the graphic novel as "hilarious, charming, and much needed" while Kate Quealy-Gainer, writing for The Bulletin of the Center for Children's Books, called it a "funny, thoughtful story of negotiating school dynamics, cultural identity, and individual agency."

Narratively, reviewers focused on Fahmy's ability to mix humor with more complex reflections about identity. Kirkus highlighted how "Fahmy comedically captures Huda’s embarrassing moments, conflicting desires for validation and acceptance, and the sarcasm she uses as a coping mechanism when facing everyday Islamophobia, xenophobia, bigotry, and microaggressions". Quealy-Gainer similarly noted that "Fahmy portrays the negotiations of identity—be it social, cultural, or personal—in high school with humor and genuine warmth". While calling the novel "entertaining" and "frequently wry", Publishers Weekly highlighted that "Fahmy is forthright in her dialogues and depictions".

Reviewers also discussed Fahmy's illustrations. Publishers Weekly and Kirkus Reviews made note of the background characters, who have a variety of skin tones, including the female Muslim characters, who wear hijabs of various styles. Kirkus further highlighted how "the full-color artwork shows stylized, cartoon-style figures whose minimalistic features emphasize the emotions shown by their facial expressions."

Booklist and School Library Journal also reviewed the novel.

== Honors ==
Huda F Are You? is a Junior Library Guild book, and it was nominated for the 2022 Goodreads Choice Award for Graphic Novels & Comics.
