= Frontier Living =

1961 children's history book

- Author: Edwin Tunis
- Illustrator: Edwin Tunis
- Language: English
- Genre: Children's literature
- Publisher: The World Publishing Company
- Publication date: 1975
- Publication place: United States

Frontier Living is a 1961 United States history book written and illustrated by Edwin Tunis. The book explores the lives of settlers living on the frontier, starting with the Jamestown Colony in 1607, and how their lives changed as the country expanded westward. Tunis drew over 200 drawings for the book, ranging from maps, still lives of tools like looms, and landscapes. The book was recognized with a Newbery Honor in 1962.
