= Double Helix (novel) =

2004 young adult novel by Nancy Werlin

- First edition cover (publ. Dial Press)
- Author: Nancy Werlin
- Publisher: Dial Press
- Publication date: March 30, 2004
- ISBN: 978-0-803-72606-2

Double Helix (2004) is a novel by American writer Nancy Werlin about 18-year-old Eli Samuels, who works for a famous molecular biologist named Dr. Quincy Wyatt. There is a mysterious connection between Dr. Wyatt and Eli's parents, and all Eli knows about the connection is that it has something to do with his mother, who has Huntington's disease. Because of the connection between Dr. Wyatt and the Samuels family, Eli's father is strongly against Eli working there. The job is perfect, and the wages are great, but Eli can't help but notice that Dr. Wyatt seems to be a little too interested in him. Later on, as Eli continues to work in the lab, he discovers with the help of Kayla Matheson, Dr. Wyatt's supposed "niece," that he and Kayla are the product of a highly unethical eugenics experiment.

== Characters ==
- Eli Samuels: Eli is 18 years old, 6′9″ (201 centimeters) tall. He's an A student, and is the salutatorian in high school. His mother has Huntington's disease, which he could have too.
- Jonathan Samuels: Jonathan Samuels is Eli's father, who loved his wife. He has a problem with Eli working at Wyatt Transgenic's, because of things that went down in the past. He is initially completely unwilling to tell Eli anything about his mother's relationships with Dr. Wyatt.
- Dr. Quincy Wyatt: Dr. Quincy Wyatt is a famed geneticist, who is considered to be on par with Mendel, Watson, and Crick. He offers Eli a job. He displays an unexplained interest in Eli.
- Vivian Fadiman: Vivian Fadiman is Eli's girlfriend and Valedictorian at his high school. All she wants is to be part of his life and she supports him in everything he does. It's hard for her to understand why Eli hides major parts of his life from her. Eli is devoted to her, though they do go through some rough times.
- Kayla Matheson: A year older than Eli, he gets to know her via Dr. Wyatt. He is attracted to her because of her beauty and athleticism.
- Ava Samuels: Ava Samuels was Eli's mother and lived in a nursing home because of her Huntington's disease. She had a mysterious connection with Dr. Wyatt.

== Themes ==
The story addresses a lot of recent scientific breakthroughs, and uses them as plot devices. For instance, The Human Genome Project, which documents all the genes and DNA in the human genetic makeup, is talked about when Dr. Wyatt explains his genetic testing to Eli for the first time. Scientific American recently published an article detailing the possible uses for the information gathered from the Human Genome Project. Modern advancements in gene studies currently can detect and, in some cases, even predict the presence of a genetic abnormality. In Double Helix, this ability to detect flaws before birth was used to genetically engineer a “more perfect son, devoid of flaws and with a proper chance to live free of Huntington's.”

For some people, the biggest issue with genetic engineering is whether or not to seek out and act on knowledge about genetic flaws. Double Helix attempts to explore the life saving and life destroying aspects of genetic engineering. The book proposes that, while Eli's life was saved by avoiding the Huntington's disease gene, his concept of life and self were destroyed when he found out he was genetically engineered to be a certain way.

== Reception ==
Double Helix received reviews from Booklist, Kirkus Reviews, and Publishers Weekly.
