= Marked by Fire =

1982 novel by Joyce Carol Thomas

- Author: Joyce Carol Thomas
- Language: English
- Genre: Children's novel
- Publication date: January 1, 1982
- Publication place: United States
- Media type: Print

Marked by Fire is a 1982 novel by Joyce Carol Thomas. It co-won the 1983 National Book Award for Children's Books in the paperback category with A Place Apart by Paula Fox. (Note: From 1980 to 1983, there were awards for hardcover and paperback books in many categories. Almost all of the paperback award-winners were reprints, but Marked by Fire was original in 1982.)

The story follows the life of Abyssinia "Abby" Jackson, whose home in Oklahoma is destroyed by a tornado and fire. Her father's name was Strong and her mother's Patience.
