= William Alexander (author) =

American writer and academic (born 1976)

- Born: William Joseph Alexander; October 9, 1976 (age 50); Miami, Florida, U.S.
- Education: Oberlin College; University of Vermont
- Occupations: Writer, academic
- Writing career
- Notable awards: National Book Award for Young People's Literature
- Website: www.willalex.net

William Joseph Alexander (born October 9, 1976) is an American writer and academic. He is an adjunct professor in liberal arts at the Vermont College of Fine Arts, located in Montpelier, Vermont.

== Early life and education ==
William Alexander was born in Miami and raised in Texas and Philadelphia. He studied theater and folklore at Oberlin College, located in Oberlin, Ohio; and English at the University of Vermont, located in Burlington, Vermont.

== Career ==
His first published work of speculative fiction was the seven page short story "The Birthday Rooms" (Zahir, Summer 2005), which earned a 2006 Calvino Prize nomination.

Alexander acknowledges that his writing style is influenced by well-known author including Ursula K. Le Guin, Sir Arthur Conan Doyle, and Susan Cooper. Goblin Secrets has received praise from Alexander's literary heroine Le Guin, author of the Earthsea series, and from Peter S. Beagle, author of The Last Unicorn, and a starred review from Kirkus Reviews.

He won the annual National Book Award for Young People's Literature recognizing his debut novel, Goblin Secrets, which was published by Margaret K. McElderry Books in 2012. It features an orphaned boy who runs away to search for his lost brother in the magical city of Zombay.

Alexander planned a series of novels set in Zombay. After the release of Goblin Secrets he told the Enchanted Inkpot, "That place isn't done with me yet. The next Zombay book is about music and shadows. It runs parallel to this one, sharing a few scenes and characters but otherwise unfolding in different parts of the city. Zombay is a big place. Cities are always full of different stories unfolding at once." The first sequel was released March 2013, Ghoulish Song. British editions of both novels were published later that year by the Much-in-Little imprint of Constable & Robinson.

Alexander has noted that Ghoulish Song is "not precisely a sequel ... the two happen at the same time, in the same city, and involve several of the same characters, but the books also stand alone. You can see them unfold in the background of each other, if you look."

His novel Sunward was shortlisted for the 2026 Ursula K. Le Guin Prize. It was a finalist for the 2026 Philip K. Dick Award.

== Selected works ==
=== Novels ===
==== Adult ====
- Sunward (2025)

==== Zombay ====
- Goblin Secrets (Margaret K. McElderry, 2012, ISBN 1-4424-2726-4)
- Ghoulish Song (McElderry, 2013, ISBN 1-4424-2729-9)

===== Ambassador =====
- Ambassador
- Nomad

===== Properly Unhaunted Place =====
- A Properly Unhaunted Place
- A Festival of Ghosts

===== Younger children =====
- The Legend of Memo Castillo

=== Children's nonfiction ===
- Celia Cruz

=== Other works ===
- "The Birthday Rooms", Zahir #7, Summer 2005, pp. 6–12 (his speculative fiction debut)
- "A Revisionist History of Earthsea" (essay), Strange Horizons, October 2008
