= The Rules of Survival =

2006 novel by Nancy Werlin

- Author: Nancy Werlin
- Language: English
- Genre: Young adult literature
- Publisher: Dial Books for Young Readers
- Publication date: 2006
- Publication place: United States
- Media type: Print (hardcover, paperback), CD, audible
- Pages: 259 pp.
- ISBN: 978-0-8037-3001-4 (hc)

The Rules of Survival is a 2006 novel written by Nancy Werlin. It depicts the story of a boy and his two siblings trying to survive vicious emotional and physical abuse by their mother, Nikki. This book was a finalist for the 2006 National Book Award for Young People's Literature. It also received recognition as a 2007 Best Book for Young Adults from the American Library Association.

== Plot summary ==
The book starts out with an introduction when Matthew Walsh is writing a letter to his younger sister Emmy to tell her the story of their mother's vicious abuse. The real story starts with Matthew and his other younger sister, Callie. Callie is eleven, Matthew is thirteen, and Emmy is a toddler. Callie and Matthew go to the Cumberland Farms store to get popsicles because there is a heatwave in the town in which they live. They see Murdoch for the first time, protecting a kid from being openly abused. Matthew and Callie like Murdoch, and both of them want to track him down so that they can be his friend.

Meanwhile, the first act of abuse that is shown in the book comes when Nikki throws Portuguese Seafood Paella at Matthew after Nikki finds Murdoch's address that Callie found on the Internet. Nikki begins to date Murdoch, but eventually they break up. Nikki is enraged and tries to blame it on Murdoch. She wants to call the Social Services and report Murdoch for abuse. Murdoch gets a restraining order against Nikki for constantly following and stalking him. Nikki is angry and sends a man called Rob to brutalize Murdoch. Nikki and Rob eventually end up in jail.

After she gets out of jail, she recklessly drives in search of Murdoch. Instead, she finds pleasure in tormenting Julie, a friend of Murdoch. Julie loses the use of her legs, and Nikki ends up in jail again. Ben, Matthew's father (who is scared of Nikki), and Bobbie, Nikki's sister, use this opportunity to gain joint custody of Matthew, Callie, and Emmy. Matthew lives with Aunt Bobbie while Callie and Emmy live with Ben in Arlington, Massachusetts. Things are fine for a while until Nikki kidnaps Emmy and gets her drunk, although she is about eight years old. Matthew gets a call from Emmy and she tells him where she is. Matthew rescues Emmy, only to run into Nikki. Matt is about to kill Nikki when Murdoch appears. Murdoch advises her to run away and never come back.

But this is not the end of Nikki. Letters continue to come. Some of them are normal, but some contain threatening messages like "I will kill you" or "It was Murdoch's fault." The book ends with Murdoch telling Matt that he was also abused when he was younger. In the end, Matt never gives the letter to Emmy.

== Characters ==
- Matthew, the main character of the story, writing a letter to Emmy. Child of Nikki and Ben. Brother of Callie and half-sister Emmy. He wants a hero in his world so that his life can become normal. His respect for his mother changes throughout the story.
- Callie, Matthew's sister.
- Emmy, the youngest sibling in the family. She was a baby when she was first introduced. Daughter of Nikki and an unknown father.
- Nikki, the abusive mother in the family. Isn't quite sane. At some points, she can be a loving mother but is only faking it. Her love for her children is nonexistent. She also tends to hurt the ones she loves (like her children).
- Ben, the former husband of Nikki and father of Callie and Matthew. He is scared for the children but also scared to act until he realizes he should be helping them out. He gains joint custody of the children along with Aunt Bobbie
- Aunt Bobbie, Nikki's sister and Matt, Callie & Emmy's aunt. She does not help the children in times of need but realizes her mistakes and starts helping the children out and helps get them away from Nikki. Gains part custody of the children at the end of the book.
- Murdoch, The ex-boyfriend of Nikki and the role model for Matthew. He is Matthew's hero but is a lot like Matthew. When he was a child his father used to torment him. Murdoch killed his father as a child so when Matt wants to kill his mother, he convinces him not to because he doesn't want Matthew to live with that debt. That's why Murdoch understands what Matthew and his family are going through better than most.
- Julie, Murdoch's neighbor until she got into a car accident with Nikki and moved to live with her parents. Unimportant character. Vaguely mentioned. Though she was important to the point where when she was in a car accident with Nikki, it caused Nikki to lose custody of her children.
