= Nancy Werlin =

American writer of young-adult novels (born 1961)

- Born: October 29, 1961 (age 64); Salem, Massachusetts, U.S.
- Education: Yale University (BA)
- Notable work: Double Helix; The Rules of Survival

Nancy Werlin (born October 29, 1961, in Salem, Massachusetts) is an American writer of young-adult novels.

== Biography ==
Werlin was born October 28, 1961, in Salem, Massachusetts to Arnold and Elaine Werlin. She received a Bachelor of Arts in English from Yale University in 1983.

Werlin is Jewish.

== Awards and honors ==
Awards for Werlin's writing
Year	Title	Award	Result	Ref.
1999	The Killer's Cousin	Edgar Allan Poe Award for Best Young Adult Novel	Winner	
2001	Locked Inside	Edgar Allan Poe Award for Best Young Adult Novel	Finalist	
2006	The Rules of Survival	Cybils Award for Young Adult Fiction	Finalist	
2006	The Rules of Survival	National Book Award for Young People's Literature	Finalist	

== Publications ==
- Are You Alone on Purpose? (1994)
- The Killer's Cousin (1998)
- Locked Inside (2000)
- Black Mirror (2001)
- Double Helix (2004)
- The Rules of Survival (2006)
- Impossible (2008)
- Extraordinary (2010)
- Unthinkable (2013) – sequel to Impossible
- And Then There Were Four (2017)
- Zoe Rosenthal Is Not Lawful Good (2021)
- Healer and Witch (2022)
