= Victor Martinez (author) =

American poet and author (1954–2011)

- Born: February 21, 1954; Fresno, California, U.S.
- Died: February 18, 2011 (aged 56); San Francisco, California, U.S.
- Education: California State University, Fresno (BA); Stanford University (MFA)
- Occupations: Author, poet
- Notable work: Parrot in the Oven: Mi Vida
- Movement: Chicano Movement
- Awards: National Book Award for Young People's Literature

Victor L. Martinez (February 21, 1954 – February 18, 2011) was an American poet and author. He won the 1996 U.S. National Book Award for Young People's Literature for his first novel, Parrot in the Oven: Mi Vida.

== Life ==
Martinez was the born in Fresno, California to Mexican migrant agricultural field workers of the Central Valley. He was one of twelve children. Victor attended California State University at Fresno and later obtained a graduate degree from Stanford University on a Wallace Stegner Creative Writing Fellowship. He began writing as a poet and published a book of poetry, "Caring for a House," in 1992. He was a member of Humanizarte, a collective of Chicano poets, and later of the Chicano/Latino Writers' Center of San Francisco. He supported himself with jobs as a welder, truck driver, firefighter, teacher, and office clerk. In February 2011, he died of lung cancer at age 56 in San Francisco.

== Parrot in the Oven ==
Martinez and his first novel Parrot in the Oven: Mi Vida won a National Book Award in 1996.

Parrot was a semi-autobiographical account of a 14-year-old Mexican American boy growing up "in a world of gangs, violence and poverty" in the projects of Central Valley (California). Martinez wrote the novel for adults but an editor suggested promoting it in the young adult fiction market. It has been translated into languages including Spanish, Italian, Japanese, and German, and widely acclaimed by young people around the world.

== Works ==
=== Poetry ===
- Caring for a House, Chusma House Publications, 1992, ISBN 978-0-9624536-4-9

=== Novels ===
- El loro en el horno: mi vida, Noguer y Caralt, 2003, ISBN 978-84-279-3238-8
- Parrot in the Oven: Mi Vida. HarperCollins. 1998. ISBN 978-0-06-447186-2.

=== Anthologies ===
- Roger Weingarten; Richard Higgerson, eds. (2003). "I'm Still Alive; Failed Teachers; Sisters; A Tiny Man of Print". Poets of the new century. David R. Godine Publisher. ISBN 978-1-56792-178-6.
- Gerald W. Haslam, ed. (1999). "Don't Forget". Many Californias: literature from the Golden State. University of Nevada Press. ISBN 978-0-87417-325-3.
