= Sea of Ink and Gold =

Young adult novel series by Traci Chee

The Sea of Ink and Gold trilogy is a three-part young adult fantasy novel series written by Traci Chee, published by G.P. Putnam's Sons Books for Young Readers. The trilogy includes the following books: The Reader (2016), The Speaker (2017), The Storyteller (2018).

The Reader was a New York Times best seller.

== The Reader (2016) ==
The Reader was published September 13, 2016.

The book was a New York Times best seller and Junior Library Guild selection. It received starred reviews from Kirkus Reviews, Publishers Weekly, School Library Journal, and Booklist, as well as a positive review from Shelf Awareness.

Kirkus Reviews, NPR, BuzzFeed, Bustle, and Minnesota Public Radio named The Reader one of the best young adult books of 2016.

The audiobook, narrated by Kim Mai Guest, received a starred review from Booklist.

Awards and accolades for The Reader
Year	Accolade	Result	Ref.
2019	Oregon Reader's Choice Awards	Nominee	
2017	American Booksellers Association Indies Choice Book of the Year for Young Adult	Honor	
2017	Booklist's Best First Novels on Audio	Top 10	
2017	YALSA Best Fiction for Young Adults	Top 10	
2016	Goodreads Choice Award for Debut Goodreads Author	Nominee	
2016	Kirkus Prize for Young Adult	Finalist	

== The Speaker (2017) ==
The Speaker was published November 7, 2017.

The book received starred reviews from Kirkus Reviews and School Library Journal, as well as positive reviews from Booklist and Shelf Awareness.

The audiobook, narrated by Kim Mai Guest, received a positive review from Booklist.

== The Storyteller (2018) ==
The Storyteller was published November 13, 2018.

The book received starred reviews from Kirkus Reviews, and Booklist.
