= Carolyn Coman =

American writer

- Born: October 28, 1951 (age 73); Evanston, Illinois, U.S.
- Occupation: Writer
- Genre: Children's literature
- Children: 2

Carolyn Coman (born October 28, 1951) is an American writer best known for children's books. Her novels What Jamie Saw (1995) and Many Stones (2000) were among the runners-up for major annual awards by the American Library Association (ALA) and the National Book Foundation.

== Biography ==
Carolyn Coman was born October 28, 1951, in Evanston, Illinois, near Chicago. She worked as a bookbinder 1975-84 and later as an editor with Heinemann before she became a full-time writer. She edited Body and Soul, a photo-portrait documentary by Judy Dater, and wrote the text of a children's picture book, prior to completing four young-adult novels from 1993 to 2000. Her novels for middle-grade readers (2004 and 2007) combine humour, investigation and a sense of nostalgia.

In the YA novels, "She explores the darker sides of growing up: dealing with parent's abandonment through death in Tell Me Everything, abuse by a stepparent in What Jamie Saw, sibling incest in Bee and Jacky and a political-inspired tragedy in Many Stones." Many Stones was inspired by the murder of Amy Biehl.

What Jamie Saw (1995) was Newbery Medal honor book and a National Book Award for Young People's Literature finalist. Many Stones (2000) was a Michael L. Printz Award Honor Book and another National Book Award finalist. (From 1922 the ALA Newbery Medal recognizes the previous year's "most distinguished contribution to American literature for children", with some designated runners-up now called "Honor Books". From 2000, the Newbery and Printz separately recognize books for "children" and "teens".)

Coman has two children and lives in South Hampton, New Hampshire.

== Works ==
- Body and Soul: ten American women, edited by Coman, photographs by Judy Dater (Boston: Hill & Co., 1988), LCCN 87-32696
- Losing Things at Mr. Mudd's, illustrated by Lance Hidy (Farrar, Straus & Giroux, 1992), picture book - "Youngsters at the book's intended age range may be put off by Mr. Mudd's gruffness--even his eventual relenting bears a grudging tone. Despite the collaborators' evident talents, their work generally lacks child appeal."
- Tell me Everything (Farrar, 1993)
- What Jamie Saw (Arden, NC: Front Street, 1995)
- Bee and Jacky (Front Street, 1998) - "Coman's (What Jamie Saw) latest is the literary equivalent of a Diane Arbus photograph: it presents a sharp, shocking picture of pathology, but leaves it to the audience to imagine the world beyond the frame."
- Many Stones (Front Street, 2000), Berry (16) reconnects with her father during their journey to South Africa. - "Writing with her usual economy and penetrating insight, Coman (Bee & Jacky, 1998, etc) portrays a young person searching for something—she's not sure what—and finding it in keeping the link that her sister forged with an amazing people. It's an uplifting tale: harsh, complex, but lit at the end by a promise of reconciliation."
- The Big House, illustrated by Rob Shepperson (Front Street, 2004)
- Sneaking Suspicions, illus. Shepperson (Front Street, 2007) – sequel to The Big House
- The Memory Bank, illus. Shepperson (Arthur A. Levine Books, 2010), 288 pp. - "Brilliantly crafted, thoroughly enjoyable and, though so very like Dahl, unique as a fascinating new way to ponder dreams and memories."
- Writing Stories: ideas, exercises, and encouragements for teachers and writers of all ages, illus. Shepperson (Portland, ME: Stenhouse Publishers, 2011), LCCN 2011-7002
