= The Young United States, 1783–1830 =

1969 children's history book by Edwin Tunis

The Young United States, 1783–1830: A Time of Change and Growth, A Time of Learning Democracy, A Time of New Ways of Living, Thinking, and Doing
- Author: Edwin Tunis
- Illustrator: Edwin Tunis
- Language: English
- Genre: Children's literature
- Publisher: Crowell
- Publication date: 1969
- Publication place: United States
- Pages: 159
- ISBN: 0-690-01065-6

The Young United States, 1783–1830: A Time of Change and Growth, A Time of Learning Democracy, A Time of New Ways of Living, Thinking, and Doing is a 1969 children's United States history book written and illustrated by Edwin Tunis. It covers the period of history immediately after the conclusion of the Revolutionary War in 1783 to the first inauguration of Andrew Jackson in 1829. The book was selected as a finalist for the National Book Award for Young People's Literature in 1970.
