= Traci Chee =

American writer

- Born: California
- Education: UC Santa Cruz, San Francisco State University
- Writing career
- Language: English
- Genre: Young adult fiction
- Notable works: The Reader, We Are Not Free
- Notable awards: 2020 National Book Award, Young People’s Literature Finalist, 2021 Printz Honor
- Website: www.tracichee.com

Traci Chee is an American author of young adult fiction, best known for the Sea of Ink and Gold trilogy and We Are Not Free. Chee is fourth-generation Japanese American and resides in California where she grew up.

== Education and career ==
Chee studied literature and creative writing at the University of California, Santa Cruz, and earned a Master of Arts degree from San Francisco State University. After obtaining her master's degree, Chee entered a writing contest called The Pitch Wars, which gives new writers a chance to show their work to literary agents by pairing them up with established mentors. Chee was paired up with author Renée Ahdieh. The Pitch Wars led her to obtain a literary agent and publishing deal with Putnam for her first book The Reader.

== Selected works ==
=== Sea of Ink and Gold trilogy (2016-2020) ===
Sea of Ink and Gold trilogy is a work of fantasy about a world in which no one knows about books and reading. In addition to multiple plot lines and a story-within-a-story, the book contains several ciphers for the reader to discover and decode. The books appeared on The New York Times Best Seller list.

=== We Are Not Free (2020) ===
Chee's book We Are Not Free is a work of historical fiction about Japanese-American teenagers during World War II facing forced relocation and imprisonment at the Japanese-American internment camps, or segregated military service in war-torn Europe. It is based on interviews with her relatives, as well as letters from her nisei grandparents who, although American citizens from San Francisco, were incarcerated as teens at Topaz War Relocation Center during the war due their ethnicity. It won the Printz Honor award in 2021 and was a finalist for the National Book Awards 2020 for Young People's Literature.

=== A Thousand Steps into Night (2022) ===
A Thousand Steps into Night is a Japanese-influenced fantasy about demons, adventure, and plans gone awry. It was longlisted for the National Book Awards 2022 for Young People's Literature.

== Bibliography ==
Sea of Ink and Gold:

- The Reader, Putnam, September 13, 2016
- The Speaker, Putnam, November 7, 2017
- The Storyteller, Putnam, November 13, 2018

We Are Not Free, HMH Books for Young Readers, September 1, 2020

A Thousand Steps into Night, Clarion Books, March 1, 2022
