= Huda F Cares? =

2023 graphic novel by Huda Fahmy

- Author: Huda Fahmy
- Genre: Young adult graphic novel
- Publisher: Dial Books
- Publication date: October 10, 2023
- Pages: 208
- ISBN: 9780593532805
- Preceded by: Huda F Are You?
- Followed by: Huda F Wants to Know?

Huda F Cares? is a 2023 young adult graphic novel by American author Huda Fahmy. It was a finalist for the National Book Award for Young People's Literature.

== Plot ==
Huda F Cares? follows Huda and her family as they take a road trip from Dearborn, Michigan to Orlando, Florida to visit Walt Disney World. Over the 24-hour road trip, the family eats at rest stops, shares tight quarters, and prays in public spaces "with all eyes on them". After arriving at Walt Disney World, Huda experiences some culture shock seeing others' "revealing clothing, alcohol consumption, and public intimacy". While waiting in line for one of the rides with her sister, Huda befriends Kylie, though Kylie's friends make Islamophobic remarks. In the end, Huda's relationship with her sister is strengthened, as is "her family’s belief in having the right to joy and claiming their place as Muslim Americans".

== Reception ==
Kirkus Reviews referred to Huda F Cares? as "delightfully heartwarming", as well as "comedic and poignant", highlighting how "Fahmy’s narrative captures universal feelings of fluctuating confidence and self-deprecation, the ups and downs of family dynamics, and the growing awareness of siblings’ humanity outside the family unit."

Sarah Hunter, writing on behalf of Booklist, discussed Fahmy's skill in character development, noting that "the sisters’ varied personalities come through, especially in how they individually feel about being visibly Muslim in a place where they’re in the minority." Hunter also noted that "conflicts about how to react to racism and prejudice [...] are neatly folded into the plot." Commenting on the illustrations, Hunter wrote, "Fahmy’s signature simplified cartooning style softens some of the tougher moments the sisters encounter, while still enabling her quick, sharp humor to stick the landing".

School Library Journal's Carla Riemer called the novel "a funny, enjoyable story", noting that it "is a delightful story, even when addressing difficult issues".

== Honors ==
Huda F Cares? was a finalist for the National Book Award for Young People's Literature. It is also a Junior Library Guild book.
