= Me (Moth) =

2021 young-adult verse novel by Amber McBride

- Author: Amber McBride
- Language: English
- Genre: Young adult, novel in verse, fantasy
- Publisher: Feiwel and Friends/MacMillian Publishers
- Publication date: August 17, 2021
- Pages: 256
- ISBN: 9781250780362 Hardcover edition

Me (Moth) is a young adult fantasy novel in verse by Amber McBride, published August 17, 2021 by Feiwel and Friends. The book won the John Steptoe New Talent Award and was a finalist for the National Book Award for Young People's Literature.

== Reception ==
Me (Moth) was generally well-received, including starred reviews from Booklist and School Library Journal. Melanie Marshall, writing for Booklist,

Though the traditions are distinct on their own, McBride artfully weaves Black Southern hoodoo traditions with those of the Navajo/Diné people, creating a beautiful and cross-cultural reverence for the earth, its inhabitants, and our ancestors. Readers will be consumed by the weight of McBride's intentionality from road trip stops to the nuance of everything that goes unsaid. Written in verse, this debut novel is hauntingly romantic, refusing to be rushed or put down without deep contemplation of what it means to accept the tragedies of our lives and to reckon with the ways we metamorphosize as a result of them. An excellent choice for lovers of poetry and for those who see the beauty in sadness.

School Library Journal's Erica Ruscio highlighted how "each free verse poem is tightly composed, leading into the next for a poignant and richly layered narrative. The story builds softly and subtly to a perfect, bittersweet ending." They concluded that the book is "earnest" and "surprising" and thus, "is a must purchase for all teen collections."

Publishers Weekly wrote, "Debut author McBride skillfully renders [the story] while covering serious topics such as grief and mental health, including suicidal ideation." Shelf Awareness's Jen Forbus also complimented McBride's writing, saying, "Her words dance across the pages with the elegance of her ballerina protagonist." Forbus continued, writing, "Me (Moth) is a rich, soul-stirring gift for any young adult. Parents will likely want to read this one as well--if they can pry it away from their teen."

NPR, Shelf Awareness, and TIME named Me (Moth) one of the best books of 2021.

Awards and honors for Me (Moth)
Year	Award/Honor	Result	Ref.
2021	Booklist's Best First Novels for Youth	Selection	
2021	Booklist Editors' Choice: Books for Youth	Selection	
2021	National Book Award for Young People's Literature	Finalist	
2022	Best Fiction for Young Adults	Top 10	
2022	Goodreads Choice Award for Poetry	Nominee	
2022	John Steptoe New Talent Award	Winner	
2022	William C. Morris Award	Finalist	
