= Amber McBride =

American writer

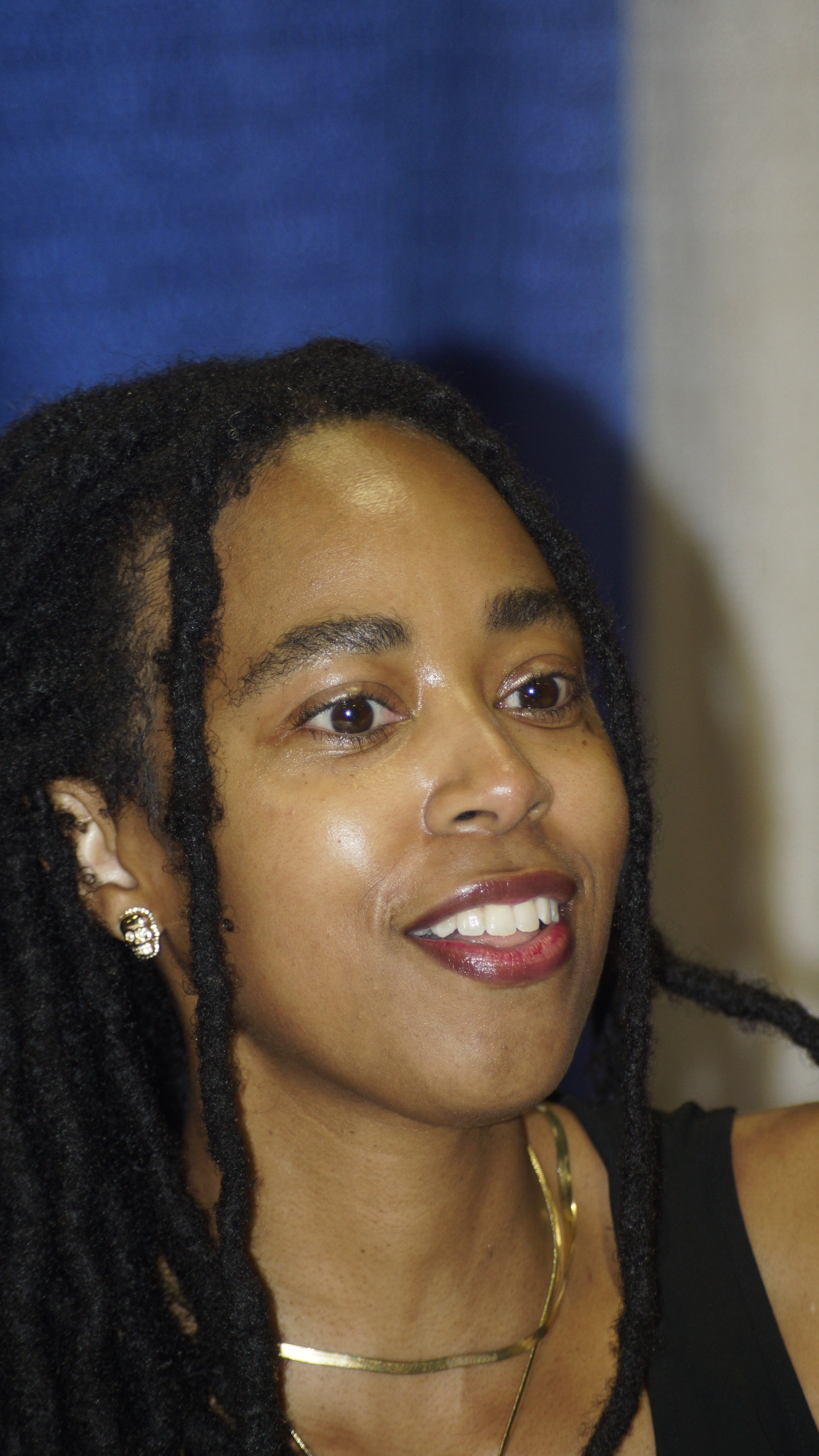
- Amber McBride in 2026 at the National Book Fair.
- Education: James Madison University (BA); Emerson College (MFA)
- Occupations: Novelist, poet, professor
- Writing career
- Language: English
- Years active: 2022–present
- Genres: Poetry, young adult
- Notable work: Me (Moth)
- Notable awards: Coretta Scott King-John Steptoe Award for New Talent (2022)
- Website: amber-mcbride.com

Amber McBride is an African-American author, poet, and professor. She is best known for her debut novel-in-verse, Me (Moth), which was nominated for the National Book Award for Young People's Literature and won the John Steptoe New Talent Award.

== Personal life ==
The first book McBride remembers reading is Mama, Would You Love Me by Barbara M. Jose. McBride says she comes from a family of storytellers, which she credits her love for writing to, as she says that oral storytelling is a big part of her experience of African American culture. She wrote her first book in fifth grade.

McBride was a pre-med student until her junior year of university but transitioned to creative writing after a car accident and subsequent stay in the hospital caused her to realize she didn't enjoy hospitals enough to become a doctor. McBride has a Bachelor of Arts in English from James Madison University and a Master of Fine Arts in poetry from Emerson College. As of 2023, she is an assistant professor of Poetry and English at the University of Virginia.

She credits working with students as one of her inspirations for wanting to write novels for young adults.

In her free time, she practices Hoodoo, and currently lives in Charlottesville, Virginia.

== Career ==
=== Me (Moth) (2022) ===
McBride's debut novel-in-verse, Me (Moth), was published in 2022 by Feiwel and Friends. It is about a Juilliard-bound dancer who gets into a car accident that changes the trajectory of her life, having her look to Hoodoo guided by her Rootworker grandfather to ease her pain and taking a trip across the United States and to the Navajo nation. The idea of writing a novel incorporating Hoodoo came to her after her grandfather died in 2019. McBride says Hoodoo and magic are often involved in her work, since she considers them to be a significant part of her lived experience. The Native American elements were inspired by her Navajo aunt and a roadtrip to the reservation, which introduced her to customs she wasn't familiar with previously.

McBride credits novels in verse like Brown Girl Dreaming, The Poet X, and A Long Way Down with inspiring her to write her own verse novel. Me (Moth) was well-received by critics, and named a Summer/Fall 2021 Indies Introduce young adult selection and a July/August 2021 Kids’ Next List pick. It was a finalist for the National Book Award for Young People's Literature in 2021, and won the John Steptoe New Talent Award in 2022.

=== We are all So Good at Smiling ===
McBride's second young adult novel in verse, We are all so Good at Smiling, about clinical depression and healing from trauma, was published in January 2022. The novel was inspired by the author's experience with depression during the COVID-19 pandemic, prompted by her author friend Ally Malinenko's own novel about her lived experience with cancer, which she called inspired by her impression that "no one ever writes about the kids who live. The sentiment resonated with McBride.

McBride says one of the goals of her novel was to make it clear that "not even Baba Yaga or Anansi the spider is [sic] immune to depression", hoping that her novel facilitates open dialogue about mental health struggles.

=== Gone Wolf ===
McBride's middle grade debut, Gone Wolf, is a dual-timeline story centering two Black girls, one living in the year 2111 and escaping a dystopian U.S., and one living in Charlottesville during the COVID-19 pandemic, dealing with generational trauma through figments of her imagination. It was published by Feiwel and Friends. It was a finalist for the Heavy Medal Mock Newbery by School Library Journal in January 2024.

== Awards and honors ==
In 2021, Me (Moth) was named one of the year's best books by NPR, Shelf Awareness, and Time. Booklist included it on their lists of "Best First Novels for Youth" and Booklist Editors' Choice: Books for Youth.

In 2025, The Leaving Room was named one of the best young adult books of the year by Publishers Weekly and Shelf Awareness.

Awards for McBride's work
Title	Year	Award/Honor	Result	Ref.
Me (Moth)	2021	National Book Award for Young People's Literature	Finalist	
Me (Moth)	2022	Best Fiction for Young Adults	Top 10	
Me (Moth)	2022	Goodreads Choice Award for Poetry	Nominee	
Me (Moth)	2022	John Steptoe New Talent Award	Winner	
Me (Moth)	2022	William C. Morris Award	Finalist	
Gone Wolf	2023	Los Angeles Times Book Prize for Young Adult Novel	Winner	
Gone Wolf	2024	Heavy Medal Mock Newbery	Finalist	
The Leaving Room	2025	National Book Award for Young People's Literature	Finalist	
The Leaving Room	2026	Ignyte Award for Outstanding Novel – Young Adult	Finalist	

== Publications ==
=== Picture books ===
- McBride, Amber (2026). Magick Hoodoo Child. Harper Collins. ISBN 9780063395404.

=== Middle grade fiction ===
- McBride, Amber (2023). Gone Wolf. Feiwel and Friends. ISBN 9781250911117.
- McBride, Amber (2024). Onyx & Beyond. Feiwel & Friends. ISBN 9781250908773.

=== Young adult fiction ===
- McBride, Amber (2021). Me (Moth). Feiwel and Friends. ISBN 9781250780362.
- McBride, Amber (2023). We Are All So Good at Smiling. Feiwel & Friends. ISBN 9781250780393.
- McBride, Amber (2025). The Leaving Room. Feiwel & Friends. ISBN 9781250411440.
- McBride, Amber; Martin, Erica; Byas, Taylor, eds. (2024). Poemhood: Our Black Revival. HarperCollins. ISBN 9780063225299.

=== Poetry ===
- McBride, Amber (2024). Thick With Trouble. Penguin. ISBN 9780143137474.
