= Yes, I'm Hot in This =

Comic strip series by Huda Fahmy

Yes, I'm Hot in This is a comic strip series by Huda Fahmy describing her day-to-day life as a Muslim in the United States. The comic has her observations on mistaken beliefs about Muslims from fellow Americans, surveillance against Muslims, and slice of life stories. The title refers to her status as a hijabi and how non-Muslim Americans encountering her are curious about her attire.

Fahmy, who never took formal art lessons, wrote down her experiences upon seeing a request for work from writers who practiced Islam, but publishers were initially not interested in her work as she was not already well-known. Fahmy's older sister suggested that she could get popularity if she posted her work on Facebook, and Fahmy also began posting them on Instagram; As of 2018, her Instagram had 200,000 followers. Fahmy's husband screens comments to remove harassment and trolling.

Her comics were published in book form by Adams Media in 2018.

== See also ==
- Islam in Houston
- Terrorism
- Antisemitism
