= Goblin Secrets =

2012 book

- Author: William Alexander
- Language: English
- Genre: Children's fantasy
- Publisher: Simon & Schuster
- Publication date: 2012
- Publication place: United States
- Pages: 256
- ISBN: 9781442427266

Goblin Secrets is the 2012 debut novel of author William Alexander. Set in the fictional clockwork city of Zombay, it follows a boy searching for his missing brother while evading the witch Graba's henchmen.

== Plot ==
Orphan Rownie lives in Zombay, bisected by a sentient river into the affluent north, run by the Lord Mayor, and the destitute south, ruled by Graba, a witch-like creature who captures orphans for use as servants. Rownie's older brother Rowan has disappeared after deciding to become an actor, which is outlawed in Zombay, except for goblins. After stealing money from Graba to attend a goblin show and evading Graba's henchmen, Rownie is taken in by a goblin troupe. He learns from the goblins that the river will flood the town unless Rowan can perform a ritual to stop it.

== Reception ==
The book won the National Book Award for Young People's Literature in 2012. Despite the award, reviews criticized the book's shallow characters, poor pacing, and lack of resolution for established plot elements.
