= Laura Ruby =

American author

- Occupations: Author, professor
- Writing career
- Notable awards: Printz Award (2016)
- Website: lauraruby.com

Laura Ruby is an American author of twelve books, including Bone Gap (2015), winner of the 2016 Michael L. Printz Award and finalist for the 2015 National Book Award for Young People's Literature. She is also a professor at Hamline University.

Bone Gap is a coming-of-age mystery about a kidnapping in a small Midwestern town, and it incorporates elements of mythology and magical realism. The New York Times Book Review called it a "lush and original young adult novel". In an interview with Publishers Weekly, Ruby characterized her award-winning novel as an "oddball" book that doesn't fit neatly into one genre.

== Biography ==
Ruby grew up in New Jersey, and now lives in the Chicago metropolitan area.

She is a faculty member at Hamline University in the low-residency MFA program in writing for children and young adults.

She teaches fantasy writing workshops for children's authors at Highlights.

== Awards and honors ==
Ruby's books and audiobooks constitute seven Junior Library Guild selections: Bone Gap (audiobook and book) (2015), The Shadow Cipher (2017), The Clockwork Ghost (2019), Thirteen Doorways, Wolves Behind Them All (audiobook and book) (2020), and The Map of Stars (2020).

In 2015, Bone Gap was named one of the best books of the year by Bank Street College of Education, Chicago Public Library, Locus, the New York Public Library, Publishers Weekly, and School Library Journal.

In 2017, The Shadow Cipher was named one of the best books of the year by the Chicago Public Library, New York Public Library, and Los Angeles Public Library.

In 2019, Thirteen Doorways, Wolves Behind Them All was named one of the best books of the year by the Chicago Public Library,Locus, NPR, School Library Journal, Shelf Awareness, and Tor.com.

Literary awards for Ruby's writing
Year	Title	Award	Category	Result	Ref.
2004	Lily's Ghosts	Edgar Award	Juvenile	Finalist	
2007	The Chaos King	Cybils Award	Elementary and Middle Grade Speculative Fiction	Finalist	
2012	Bad Apple	Popular Paperbacks for Young Adults	—	Selection	
2015	Bone Gap	Booklist Editors' Choice	Books for Youth	Selection	
2015	Bone Gap	Cybils Award	Young Adult Speculative Fiction	Finalist	
2015	Bone Gap	National Book Award	Young People's Literature	Finalist	
2015	Bone Gap	Nebula Award	Andre Norton Award	Finalist	
2016	Bone Gap	ALA Best Fiction for Young Adults	—	Selection	
2016	Bone Gap	Michael L. Printz Award	—	Winner	
2016	The Shadow Cipher	ALA Best Fiction for Young Adults	—	Selection	
2019	Thirteen Doorways, Wolves Behind Them All	Booklist Editors' Choice	Books for Youth	Selection	
2019	Thirteen Doorways, Wolves Behind Them All	Geffen Award	Translated Fantasy Book	Finalist	
2019	Thirteen Doorways, Wolves Behind Them All	National Book Award	Young People's Literature	Finalist	
2020	Thirteen Doorways, Wolves Behind Them All	ALA Best Fiction for Young Adults	—	Selection	
2020	Thirteen Doorways, Wolves Behind Them All	Rise: A Feminist Book Project	—	Selection	

== Published works ==
=== Standalone books ===
- Lily’s Ghosts (2003)
- Everything I Wanted to Know About Being a Girl I Learned from Judy Blume (2006)
- I'm Not Julia Roberts (2007)
- Good Girls (2006)
- Play Me (2008)
- Bad Apple (2009)
- Bone Gap (2015)
- Thirteen Doorways, Wolves Behind Them All (2019)

=== York series ===
- York: The Shadow Cipher (2017)
- York: The Clockwork Ghost (2019)
- York: The Map of Stars (2020)

=== The Wall and the Wing series ===
- The Wall and the Wing (2006)
- The Chaos King (2007)
