= We Are Not Free =

2020 novel by Traci Chee

- Author: Traci Chee
- Language: English
- Subject: World War II
- Genre: Young adult fiction, Historical fiction
- Publisher: HMH Books for Young Readers
- Publication date: September 1, 2020
- Publication place: United States
- Media type: Print
- ISBN: 9780358131434

We Are Not Free is a young adult historical fiction novel by Traci Chee, published September 1, 2020 by HMH Books for Young Readers. TIME included it on their list of the 100 best young adult novels of all time.

== Reception ==
=== Reviews ===
We Are Not Free received starred reviews from Booklist, Publishers Weekly, School Library Journal, and Kirkus Reviews.

Kirkus Reviews named We Are Not Free one of the best young adult novels of 2020, and TIME included it on their list of the 100 best young adult novels of all time.

=== Awards and accolades ===
Accolades for We Are Not Free
Year	Accolade	Result	Ref.
2020	National Book Award for Young People's Literature	Finalist	
2021	Michael L. Printz Award	Honor	
2021	Walter Dean Myers Award	Honor	
2021	YALSA's Best Fiction for Young Adults	Selection	
2021	YALSA's Amazing Audiobooks for Young Adults	Top 10	
2022	Asian/Pacific American Award for Youth Literature	Honor	
