= Bone Gap (novel) =

2015 young adult novel by Laura Ruby

- Author: Laura Ruby
- Language: English
- Genre: Young adult fiction, Magical realism
- Publisher: Balzer + Bray
- Publication date: March 3, 2015
- ISBN: 978-0-0623-1760-5

Bone Gap is a young adult novel by Laura Ruby published on March 3, 2015 by Balzer + Bray. It won the 2016 Michael L. Printz Award.

== Reception ==
Bone Gap was generally well received by critics, including a starred review from Kirkus Reviews, who called the novel "cleverly conceived and lusciously written."

Booklist's Sarah Hunter referred to the writing style as "refined and delicately crafted." She highlighted how "Ruby weaves powerful themes throughout her stunning novel" and "imbues all of it with captivating, snowballing magic realism, which has the dual effect of making the hard parts of the story more palatable to read while subtly emphasizing how purely wicked and dehumanizing assault can be."

Jennifer M. Brown, reviewing for Shelf Awareness, discussed how "Ruby probes the meaning of beauty and perception, steadfastness and fickleness in surprising ways as she builds the tension to a climax. She balances supernatural elements with timeless coming-of-age questions that come with intimacy." Brown concluded by saying, "Readers will devour this in one sitting."

== Awards and honors ==
In 2015, Booklist included Bone Gap on their "Booklist Editors' Choice: Books for Youth" list. The following year, the American Library Association named it among their Best Fiction for Young Adults.

Awards for Bone Gap
Year	Award	Result	Ref.
2015	Andre Norton Award	Finalist	
2015	Cybils Award for Young Adult Speculative Fiction	Finalist	
2015	National Book Award for Young People's Literature	Finalist	
2016	Michael L. Printz Award	Winner	
