= Thirteen Doorways, Wolves Behind Them All =

2019 young adult novel by Laura Ruby

- Author: Laura Ruby
- Language: English
- Published: October 1, 2019
- Publisher: Balzer + Bray

Thirteen Doorways, Wolves Behind Them All is a young adult novel by Laura Ruby, published October 1, 2019, by Balzer + Bray.

== Critical reception ==
Thirteen Doors, Wolves Behind Them All received starred reviews from School Library Journal and Booklist.

School Library Journal's Liz Overber wrote that "powerful plotting, masterful character development, and a unique narrative device set this work apart." She compared the novel to Code Name Verity and The Book Thief.

Booklist's Sarah Hunter highlighted how "Ruby’s delicate, powerful storytelling—it’s as if each word carries deliberate weight—draws out potent connections among women living in different eras, and the places where their stories overlap captivatingly demonstrate the varied ways anger, love, strength, vengeance, and forgiveness appear. If that sounds esoteric, never fear: Ruby’s well-wrought, multifaceted characters, both living and dead, are front and center of this moving novel. But the constellation collectively shaped by those characters’ stories reveals profound, bewitching truths about the vast, sometimes cruel, sometimes loving, possibilities of human nature."

Common Sense Media gave the novel five stars, calling it a "haunting and unforgettable novel of love, loss, and hope."

Kirkus Reviews referred to the novel as "A layered, empathetic examination of the ghosts inside all girls’ lives, full of historical realism and timeless feeling."

Publishers Weekly called it "evocative" and stated, "Though a slow unspooling may frustrate some, the women’s resonant journeys, marked by desire and betrayal, thoughtfully illuminate the deep harm that women and girls suffer at the hands of a patriarchal society as well as the importance of living fully."

The New York Times also provided a positive review.

The audiobook, narrated by Lisa Flanagan, also received a positive review from Booklist, who highlighted how Flanagan's voice mirrored the tone of the work. They further noted that "Flanagan’s voice manifesting burgeoning gravitas ... will propel both teens to open the doorways and confront the necessary challenges to move forward toward freedom."

== Awards and honors ==
Both the book and audiobook editions of Thirteen Doorways, Wolves Behind Them All are Junior Library Guild books.

Awards for Thirteen Doorways, Wolves Behind Them All
Year	Award	Result	Ref.
2019	Booklist Editors' Choice: Books for Youth		
2019	National Book Award for Young People's Literature	Finalist	
2020	ALA Best Fiction for Young Adults	Selection	
2020	Rise: A Feminist Book Project	Selection	
2024	Geffen Award for Best Translated Young Adult Book	Finalist	
