= Thanhha Lai =

Vietnamese-born American writer of children's literature

- Born: Lại T. Thanh Hà; January 1, 1965 (age 61); Saigon, Vietnam
- Education: New York University (MFA)
- Alma mater: University of Texas at Austin
- Occupation: Young adult novelist
- Notable work: Inside Out & Back Again
- Website: thanhhalai.com

Thanhha Lai (Vietnamese: Lai T. Thanh Hà; born January 1, 1965) is a Vietnamese-American writer of children's literature. She won the 2011 National Book Award for Young People's Literature and a Newbery Honor for her debut novel, Inside Out & Back Again, which was published by HarperCollins.

== Life ==
Lai was born in Saigon (now Ho Chi Minh City), on January 1, 1965. She has six older brothers. Ten years later, she fled Vietnam during the Fall of Saigon, with her family. She then moved to Alabama and graduated from University of Texas at Austin with a degree in journalism in 1988, and worked for about two years for the Orange County Register, covering Little Saigon. She earned a Master of Fine Arts from New York University and moved to New York, where she teaches at the Parsons School for Design. She lives in Croton-on-Hudson.

== Inside Out and Back Again ==
Virginia Euwer Wolff interviewed Lai for the January 2010 issue of School Library Journal and called Inside Out and Back Again "a powerful story in slender, sinewy prose poems, just a few words in each line."

A starred review by Publishers Weekly called it "especially poignant as she cycles from feeling smart in Vietnam to struggling in the States, and finally regains academic and social confidence."

The book won the National Book Award for Young People's Literature and was an Honor Book for the Newbery Medal.

== Works ==
- Inside Out and Back Again. HarperCollins. 2011. ISBN 978-0-06-196278-3.
- Listen, Slowly. HarperCollins. 2015. ISBN 978-0-06-222918-2.
- Butterfly Yellow. HarperCollins. 2019. ISBN 978-0-06-222921-2.
- Hundred Years of Happiness. HarperCollins. 2022. ISBN 978-0-06-302692-6.
