= Franny Billingsley =

American author

- Born: July 3, 1954 (age 72)
- Education: Tufts University; Boston University School of Law
- Occupation: Writer
- Notable work: Chime
- Parent: Patrick Billingsley

Franny Billingsley (born July 3, 1954) is the author of four children's fantasy novels, Well Wished, The Folk Keeper, Chime, and The Robber Girl, and the picture book Big Bad Bunny.

== Biography ==
Billingsley graduated from Tufts University in 1976, and from Boston University Law School in 1979. After moving back to Chicago, she wrote for many years while working at 57th Street Books in Hyde Park. She is now a full-time author. She has two children.

Billingsley received the PEN/Phyllis Naylor Working Writer Fellowship in 2003, which is awarded to an author of children's or young-adult fiction of literary merit to complete a manuscript.

== Works ==
- Well Wished (1997) OCLC 034886335
- The Folk Keeper (1999) OCLC 040174939
- Big Bad Bunny (2008) OCLC 074964188
- Chime (2011) OCLC 535490686
- The Robber Girl (2021), later published in Australia as A Murmuration of Starlings OCLC 1266867000

== Awards ==
- 1998 Anne Spencer Lindbergh Prize Honor Book for best fantasy written in the English language (Well Wished)
- 2000 Boston Globe–Horn Book Award, Fiction (The Folk Keeper)
- 2000 Mythopoeic Fantasy Award, Children's Literature (The Folk Keeper)
- 2011 National Book Award for Young People's Literature finalist (Chime)
