= Inside Out & Back Again =

2011 verse novel by Thanhha Lai

- Front cover of the book
- Author: Thanhha Lai
- Cover artist: Zdenko Bašić, Mauel Šumberac, Ray Shappell
- Language: English
- Genre: Historical Fiction
- Published: September 22, 2011
- Publisher: HarperCollins
- Publication place: United States
- Media type: Print (hardcover)
- Pages: 260
- ISBN: 978-0-06-196278-3
- OCLC: 606403465

Inside Out & Back Again is a verse novel, written in free verse by Thanhha Lai. The book was awarded the 2011 US National Book Award for Young People's Literature and one of the two Newbery Honors. The novel was based on her first year in the United States as a ten-year-old girl who didn't speak English, in 1975.

== Plot summary ==
In February 1975, Hà Kim and her family celebrate the new year in South Vietnam, during the Vietnam War. In the events leading to the Fall of Saigon, Hà leaves school a month early, the search for her missing-in-action soldier father continues, and everyone prepares for evacuation since the government of the North is approaching Saigon. On April 30, Hà and her family flee on a navy ship, arriving in Guam on May 28, where they are sheltered in a refugee camp.

On the Fourth of July, many other refugees are asked to write where they want to go. Hà's mother initially chooses France to live with a distant cousin, until the person behind her suggests the United States, stating that if her children are smart, the government will give them a scholarship.

After they are flown to Florida, they are sponsored by a cowboy, who drives them to his home in Alabama and allows them to stay there, and eventually at the house next to his.

In school, a boy Hà dubs "Pink Boy" breaks their friendship, due to Hà solving his math problem and Pink Boy calling her a Pancake Face (and Hà telling the school about it).

On Christmas Eve, Hà's uncle responds to the letter that her mother sent in August, asking about her husband's whereabouts. With no answer, he has nothing to say; the book says, "it would be obvious he would know nothing more".

The family then holds an impromptu funeral for Hà's father, and the book concludes on Tết, with Hà talking about things she wants to happen in 1976.

== Characters ==
Hà Kim - the protagonist of the book. She is a ten-year-old and a Buddhist.

Khôi - one of Hà's older brothers. He is a fourteen-year-old and the second youngest.

Vũ - one of Hà's older brothers. He is eighteen and is a huge fan of Bruce Lee and martial arts. By the end of the book, he goes by "Vu Lee".

Quang - Hà's oldest brother. He is twenty-one and a student in engineering. He is decently erudite in speaking English and became a translator for the other refugees during their stay in Guam.

Hà's mother - She is a war wife and a widow, who has sold her amethyst ring. She originates from Northern Vietnam.

Hà's father - Hà's deceased father. He was a soldier for Vietnam and originates from the North.

Miss Xinh - Hà's teacher in Vietnam.

TiTi - Hà's friend who leaves to escape Vietnam in Vũng Tàu.

Pink Boy - Hà's bully. By the end of the book, he stops bullying Hà.

== Origin ==
Thanhha Lai had been struggling for fifteen years in order to describe Hà's journey from Vietnam to the United States of America because Hà's journey was special—the fictional character was based on Lai's own experience at the end of the Vietnam War. To avoid embellishing her memory and risking the ire of the family that was with her, Lai decided to tell the story of Hà instead. She attempted prose from the first person and the short, detached style of Hemingway. In the end, Lai used free verse because "these phrases reflected what Vietnamese sounded like".

According to Lai her original title was Buddhists in Alabama, until she wrote "Inside Out", and her editor suggested adding "& Back Again".

== Critical reception ==
Jennifer Rothschild described “Each passage is given a date so readers can easily follow the progression of time. Sensory language describing the rich smells and tastes of Vietnam draws readers in and contrasts with Hà's perceptions of bland American food, and the immediacy of the narrative will appeal to those who do not usually enjoy historical fiction.” Publishers Weekly claimed that “Lai gives insight into cultural and physical landscapes, as well as a finely honed portrait of Hà's family as they face difficult choices ... finally regains academic and social confidence. An incisive portrait of human resilience.”
