= My Name Is Not Easy =

2011 novel by Debby Dahl Edwardson

First edition

My Name Is Not Easy is a novel by Debby Dahl Edwardson published by Marshall Cavendish in 2011. It tells the story of three Iñupiaq children who are sent from their home in the Arctic Circle to a Catholic boarding school attended by both native and white children.

The book was a 2011 National Book Award Finalist in the Young People's Literature category.
