= What Jamie Saw =

1995 novel by Carolyn Coman

- Author: Carolyn Coman
- Language: English
- Publication date: 1995

What Jamie Saw is a 1995 novel by Carolyn Coman.

After fleeing with his mother and baby sister to a family friend's hillside trailer, nine-year-old Jamie Beauville faces a life full of uncertainty and fear. He left home after his mother's boyfriend, Van, attempted to throw Nin against a wall. Jamie is determined to protect Nin at all costs. However, if Van comes looking for him, Jamie fears that everything in his life will spiral out of control.

In 1996 the novel won a Newbery Honor and was among the finalists for the National Book Award.
