= Kathryn Erskine =

American writer of children's literature

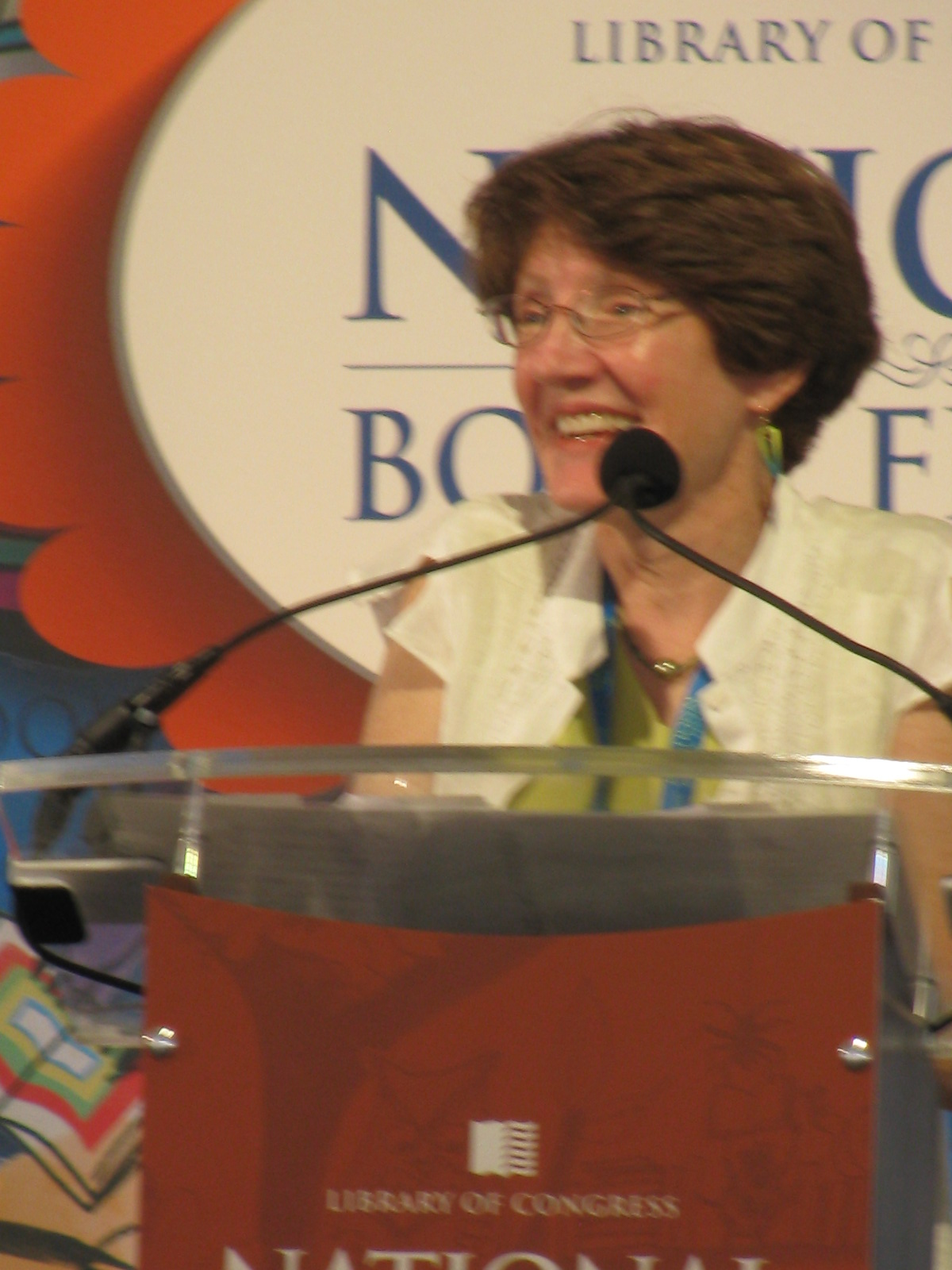
- Erskine in September 2013
- Born: Netherlands
- Education: College of William & Mary
- Writing career
- Genre: Young Adult novelist
- Notable awards: National Book Award for Young People's Literature
- Website: www.kathyerskine.com

Kathryn Erskine is an American writer of children's literature. She won the 2010 National Book Award for Young People's Literature and the 2012 Dolly Gray Children's Literature Award for her novel, Mockingbird.

== Life ==
Erskine's family traveled widely during her childhood due to her father's career. She was born in the Netherlands and has lived in South Africa, Israel, Canada, and Scotland. Erskine now lives in Virginia with her husband, Bill. She has two children, Fiona and Gavin. She also has a dog named Maxine.

She was a lawyer for many years before writing. She presents workshops at the Writer's Center.

== Bibliography ==
- Quaking, Penguin, 2007, ISBN 978-0-399-24774-3
- Mockingbird, Penguin, 2010, ISBN 978-0-399-25264-8 — winner of the National Book Award
- The Absolute Value of Mike. Penguin. 2011. ISBN 978-0-399-25505-2.
- Seeing Red, Scholastic, 2013, ISBN 978-0545464406
- Mama Africa!: How Miriam Makeba Spread Hope with Her Song, Farrar, Straus and Giroux (BYR), ISBN 9780374303013
- The Badger Knight, Scholastic, 2014, ISBN 978-0-54546442-0
