= Mockingbird (Erskine novel) =

Young adult novel by Kathryn Erskine

- Author: Kathryn Erskine
- Language: English
- Genre: Family
- Publisher: Philomel Books
- Publication place: United States
- Media type: Print
- ISBN: 0-14-241775-0

Mockingbird is a young adult novel by American author Kathryn Erskine about a girl with Asperger's syndrome coping with the loss of her brother. It won the 2010 U.S. National Book Award for Young People's Literature. In 2012, it was awarded the Dolly Gray Children's Literature Award.

== Plot ==
Ten-year-old Caitlin Smith has Asperger’s syndrome and is preoccupied with drawing. Her older brother Devon has just been killed in a school shooting, alongside a teacher and another student. Due to Caitlin's condition, she finds it difficult to cope with her feelings about what has happened. She is awkward and pedantic, seeing things in black and white, and referring to her deceased brother as "Devon who is dead" when talking to her father.

Caitlin's behaviors are perceived as "weird". She likes to hide from the rest of the world under the dresser belonging to Devon. Her classmates don't want to be friends with her due to her strange behavior.

Her counselor arranges for her to spend recess with the younger kids. She meets a boy named Michael, who is strangely sad over his mother. When she talks to her counselor about it, she tells Caitlin that he is the son of the teacher who was shot and killed in the shooting.

Caitlin discovers the words "empathy" and "closure" and determines that this is what she and her distraught father need. She finds it in the form of Devon's Eagle Scout box which has remained incomplete since his death. Caitlin thinks that if she and her father complete the box, it will bring them closure. With the help of a school counselor and art teacher, although Caitlin is initially antagonistic, she is able to help her father, as well as Michael and the school bully, Josh, the shooter's cousin, to cope.

Eventually, Caitlin, Michael, and Josh become friends. They go together to the dedication ceremony for the people killed in the shooting. The art teacher there gives Caitlin a box of pastels. After the reception, Josh, Michael, and Michael's dad play football, and the novel concludes with Caitlin creating her first colored picture, having previously only drawn in black and white.

== Reception ==
Common Sense Media found the book to be "sensitive, captivating, and, just put simply, a great read." Simon Mason of The Guardian thought that the author's "evocation of 'Asperger thinking' is impressive and sensitively managed, but such narrowing of the focus reinforces the story's programmatic nature" and concluded, "In the end, like Caitlin's drawings, Mockingbird is a neat outline in black and white. It could have done with more color."

Kirkus Reviews found that "Erskine draws directly and indirectly on To Kill a Mockingbird and riffs on its central theme: The destruction of an innocent is perhaps both the deepest kind of psychosocial wound a community can face and its greatest opportunity for psychological and spiritual growth." At the beginning of the book, Erskine dedicated the book to the victims of the Virginia Tech shooting, which had occurred three years prior.
