= Joyce Carol Thomas =

American writer

- Born: May 25, 1938; Ponca City, Oklahoma, U.S.
- Died: August 13, 2016 (aged 78); Stanford, California, U.S.
- Education: San Jose State University; Stanford University
- Occupations: Poet; playwright; speaker; author
- Writing career
- Language: English
- Notable works: Marked by Fire; Bright Shadow; Brown Honey in Broomwheat Tea; The Blacker the Berry
- Notable awards: National Book Award (1983); American Book Award

Joyce Carol Thomas (May 25, 1938 – August 13, 2016) was an American poet, playwright, motivational speaker, and author of more than 30 children's books.

== Background ==
Thomas was born in Ponca City, Oklahoma, the fifth of nine children in a family of cotton pickers. In 1948 they moved to Tracy, California, to pick vegetables. She learned Spanish from Mexican migrant workers and earned a B.A. in Spanish from San Jose State University. She took night classes in education at Stanford University, while raising four children, and received the master's degree in 1967.

== Published works ==
Novels

- Marked by Fire (1982)
- Bright Shadow (1983)
- The Golden Pasture (1986)
- Water Girl (1986)
- Journey (1988)
- When the Nightingale Sings (1992)
- House of Light (2001)
- Healer (2007)

Poetry

- Bittersweet (1973)
- Crystal Breezes (1974)
- Blessing (1975)
- Black Child (1981)
- Inside the Rainbow (1982)
- Brown Honey in Broomwheat Tea (1993)
- Gingerbread Days (1995)
- Crowning Glory (1996)
- A Mother’s Heart, A Daughter’s Love (2001)
- The Blacker the Berry (2008)

Picture Books

- Cherish Me (1998)
- You Are My Perfect Baby (1999)
- The Angel’s Lullaby (2001)
  - Alternatively titled The Angel's Lullabye
- Joy (2001)
- The Gospel Cinderella (2004)
- The Six Fools (2005)
- Shouting! (2006)
- The Three Witches (2006)

Books for Children

- I Have Heard of a Land (1998)
- The Bowlegged Rooster (2000)
- Hush Songs (2000)
- The Skull Talks Back (2004)
- What’s the Hurry, Fox? (2004)
- In the Land of Milk and Honey (2012)

Non-Fiction

- Linda Brown, You Are Not Alone (2003)

Anthologies

- I Believe in Water (2000)
- Necessary Noise (2003)
- A Gathering of Flowers: Stories about Being Young in America (1990) as Editor

Plays

- Look! What a Wonder! Berkeley (1976) Community Theatre, Berkeley, CA
- A Song in the Sky Montgomery Theater, San Francisco. 1976
- Magnolia (1977) Old San Francisco Opera House, San Francisco, CA
- Ambrosia (1978) Little Fox Theatre, San Francisco,CA
- Gospel Roots (1989) California State University, Carson City, CA
- I Have Heard of a Land (1989) Classen Theatre, Oklahoma City, OK
- When the Nightingale Sings (1991) Clarence Brown Theatre, University of Tennessee, Knoxville, TN
- A Mother’s Heart (2001) The Marsh, San Francisco, CA

== Literary awards ==
For her 1982 novel Marked by Fire, Thomas won a National Book Award in category Children's Fiction (paperback) (Note: Thomas shared the 1982 award for paperback Children's Fiction. From 1980 to 1983 in National Book Award history there were dual awards for hardcover and paperback books in many categories. Most of the paperback award-winners were reprints, including Paula Fox, A Place Apart (1980), who shared the 1982 Children's Fiction with Thomas. Marked by Fire was one of few paperback originals even among the finalists for paperback awards.) and an American Book Award. Thomas has been one of three to five finalists for the Coretta Scott King Award thrice, in 1984 for Bright Shadow, in 1994 for Brown Honey in Broomwheat Tea, and in 2009 for The Blacker the Berry. Part of the American Library Association program, the King Award annually recognizes the "most distinguished portrayal of African American experience in literature for children or teens". She also received a New York Times Outstanding Book of the Year Award and an Outstanding Woman of the 20th Century Award.

== Personal life ==
Thomas resided in Berkeley, California. She died on August 13, 2016, at the age of 78.
