= A Place Apart (Fox novel) =

1981 children's book by Paula Fox

- Author: Paula Fox
- Language: English
- Genre: Children's literature
- Publisher: Farrar, Straus and Giroux
- Publication date: September 26, 1980
- Publication place: United States

A Place Apart is a 1980 children's novel by Paula Fox. After her father's sudden death, 13-year-old Victoria and her mother are forced to move from Boston to a town in the New England countryside. There Victoria meets Hugh, an arrogant high school junior who soon takes to manipulating and bullying her. Hugh's interest wanes with the arrival of a new boy at school, Todd, whom Victoria takes a linking to. As Victoria begins to process her feelings regarding her father's death, her mother announces she is remarrying and they will be moving back to Boston.

== Reception ==
The book was a finalist for the National Book Award for Children's Books in the hardback category in 1981 and later co-won the Award in the paperback category in 1983. The Christian Science Monitor called the book "an outstanding example of serious realistic fiction for a juvenile audience" In Anne Tyler's review for the New York Times, she complimented Fox's writing and said the book was "a book apart–quiet-voiced, believable and often very moving".
