= Debby Dahl Edwardson =

American author of young adult fiction

- Born: Deborah Dahl; 1954 (age 71–72)
- Other names: Deborah Edwardson
- Education: Colorado College; Vermont College of Fine Arts (MFA)
- Occupation: Writer
- Years active: 2003–present

Deborah "Debby" Dahl Edwardson (born 1951) is an American author of young adult fiction.

== Biography ==
Debby Edwardson was born Deborah Dahl in 1951 and grew up in Minnesota. She received a degree in English from Colorado College, and an MFA from Vermont College of Fine Arts in 2005.

In 2011, Edwardson was a finalist for the National Book Award in the young adult category. She is an instructor at Iḷisaġvik College, a community college in Utqiagvik, Alaska.

She and her husband George Edwardson have seven children. She lives in Utqiagvik, Alaska. She was the president of the North Slope Borough School Board.

== Books ==
- Whale Snow (2003).
- Blessing's Bead (2009) was named in the American Library Association's 2011 list of Best Fiction for Young Adults and was named in the Top 10 Historical Fiction for Youth of 2010 by Booklist.
- My Name is Not Easy (2010) is the story of three Native Alaskan children who are sent to boarding school.
