= Barbara Wersba =

American youth and children's book author (1932–2018)

- Born: August 19, 1932; Chicago
- Died: February 18, 2018 (aged 85); Englewood, New Jersey
- Education: Bard College
- Writing career
- Genre: Children's

Barbara Wersba (August 19, 1932 Chicago - February 18, 2018 Englewood, New Jersey) was an American youth and children's book author.

== Life ==
Barbara Wersba grew up in California and later in New York City, where she attended a private school and attended theater workshops. She studied at Bard College. After graduation, she returned to Greenwich Village and took acting lessons with Paul Mann. After several years at the theater, she began writing in the 1960s.

She is the author of thirty children's and teen books. The Dream Watcher was first published in 1968. In 1973, she won the Deutscher Jugendliteraturpreis (German Children's Literature Award) for Run softly, go fast, and in 1985, she was nominated for the award for The carnival in my mind. In 1977 she was nominated for the prestigious National Book Award for Tunes for a Small Harmonica. In addition, Wersba worked for many years as an author for the New York Times Review of Books. In 1994, she founded her own, small publishing house with The Bookman Press.

She is best known for her work for young adolescents. At the center of her novels are often sensitive, often artistically gifted young people who feel misunderstood in their family environment, and find encouragement and self-affirmation in friendships with more unconventional, sometimes significantly older people.

== Works ==
- Run Softly, Go Fast, New York, NY: Athenaeum, 1970, ISBN 9780553134292
- Tunes for a small harmonica New York, N.Y. : Harper & Row, 1976. ISBN 9780060263737, OCLC 873294841
- The crystal child, New York, N.Y. : Harper & Row, 1982. ISBN 9780060263928, OCLC 8221543
- Crazy vanilla, London : Pan Books, 1988. ISBN 9780330303408, OCLC 220676260
- Let me fall before I fly, Sag Harbor, N.Y. : Bookman Press, 2001. OCLC 63585936
- The dream watcher, New York: Atheneum, 1968; Asheville, N.C. : Front Street, 2007. ISBN 9781932425086, OCLC 76799008
