= List of Daughter of Smoke and Bone characters =

This is a list of all the characters in the Daughter of Smoke and Bone novel series by Laini Taylor. Due to the large number of characters that appear over the course of the story, the list is divided by species with the exception of major characters (chimaera, seraphim, or human), along with the respective novel they have appeared in: Daughter of Smoke and Bone or Days of Blood and Starlight.

== Major characters ==
Karou: Karou is a seventeen-year-old Prague art student who speaks a variety of languages, has three bullet wounds on her stomach, and has blue hair that grows from her head. In Daughter of Smoke and Bone, she runs tasks for her foster father Brimstone by gathering the teeth of various creatures, including humans, and draws pictures of her chimaera guardians in her sketchbook. When she is in Marrakesh on a task, Akiva, a seraph, is about to kill her when he recognizes that she is truly Madrigal reborn. When Madrigal was killed, Brimstone gleaned her soul and made a new body out of a string of human baby teeth, creating the body of a human infant that he then raised as Karou. In the chimaera language, the word "karou" means "hope". In Days of Blood and Starlight, with Brimstone dead, Karou works for Thiago as the resurrectionist, as she is the only one left who truly knew the task.

Zuzana: Zuzana is described by Karou as being like a rabid, tiny fairy in appearance. She is Karou's best friend in Karou's human form and Mik's girlfriend. She and Mik have a puppet act, but it is failing now as Zuzana lacks the patience to keep it up much longer. Karou often kept her secret errands from Zuzana, but after witnessing the death of Kishmish, Zuzana learned everything. In Days of Blood and Starlight, Karou sends Zuzana an e-mail that the latter takes to mean as a code for rescuing, but it is only when she gets to the chimaera hideout that she learns Karou never wanted to be rescued. First appears in Daughter of Smoke and Bone.

Brimstone: Brimstone is a chimaera with a ram's head, lion haunches, raptor feet, and reptilian eyes, with the rest being like a man's. He runs an otherworldly shop in which hunters and graverobbers give him teeth for wishes, although there are certain requirements for the teeth so that they can be used to create a proper body for resurrection. Having raised her from infancy, Brimstone is the closest thing to a father figure that Karou knows. When Madrigal was executed by Thiago, Brimstone gleaned her soul and fashioned her a new body of a human infant so that he could raise her. Joram personally kills Brimstone and so Karou has to take over the resurrection trade. First appears in Daughter of Smoke and Bone and appears in flashbacks in Days of Blood and Starlight.

Akiva: Akiva is a seraph and member of the Misbegotten, or the illegitimate sons and daughters of Emperor Joram. He is known among his people as "Beast's Bane" because of the amount of chimaera that he has killed. Madrigal helped him so that he did not die from an injury after a battle, and he came to love her. The two met in the temple of Ellai every night until Thiago found out and had Madrigal executed. When he spies Karou in Marrakesh, Akiva is about to kill her when she turns around and he sees in her eyes that she is truly Madrigal. In Days of Blood and Starlight, he kills his father Joram to help achieve the goal that he and Madrigal strove for. Due to his mother's Stelian ancestry, he has an unusually large amount of magic for a seraph. To stop Jael's army from hatching their evil plot, he plans to burn all portals from Eretz to the human world, but is too late. First appears in Daughter of Smoke and Bone.

Thiago: Thiago is a chimaera with wolf haunches and clawed fingernails, although he was originally stag-headed like his father. The son of the Warlord, he took over the chimaera cause when his father was killed. His gonfalon was a wolf's head with the words "Victory and vengeance" underneath. Thiago has just received from Brimstone when Karou first stumbles across the space underneath Brimstone's shop, and Karou accidentally disturbs him. He goes to attack her, but Brimstone saves Karou. Madrigal was originally his suitor, and when he found her with Akiva in the temple of Ellai, he had her executed. In Days of Blood and Starlight, Thiago has appointed Karou as the new resurrectionist and the two act as the Warlord and Brimstone. Thiago makes several advances on her, but she rejects them. He tries to rape her in the pit after killing Amzallag, Tangris, and Bashees, but Karou kills him and moves Ziri's soul to his body to make it look as if nothing had happened.

Ten: Ten is a wolf-type chimaera that works personally for Thiago. In Days of Blood and Starlight, Ten is in charge with looking after Karou to make sure that she doesn't escape. Ten shows enthusiasm in this and wishes to begin resurrection work herself, although Karou denies her this right. When Bast says that Amzallag and the Shadows That Live were killed by Thiago, Karou runs into Ten on the way to the pit and gets attacked. However, Issa manages to overcome Ten and transfers her body to Haxaya's soul so that the fox-type chimaera can keep up a disguise so as not to arouse suspicion.

Ziri: Ziri is described as being Madrigal's "little Kirin shadow", and was madly in love with her. Like Madrigal, he was Kirin (see Madrigal, below) and ended up being the last of his species to occupy his natural flesh. When Madrigal was beheaded, he is said to be the only chimaera who never cheered. After Karou came back and her true identity was discovered, he was forbidden from contact with her. However, when his party (led by Balieros) disobeyed orders and went to the Hintermost to save their people, he was the only survivor and managed to glean the souls of the others. The angels attacked him and he was badly hurt, so Karou healed him so that he could remain pure. After the death of Thiago, Ziri occupied the body of Thiago as Haxaya occupied the body of Ten to carry on the charade. First appears in Days of Blood and Starlight.

== Chimaera ==
Issa: Issa is one of the Naja chimaera, meaning that she has a snake tail, the hood and fangs of a cobra, and clothes herself with snakes. She raised Karou, sharing the job with Yasri, and was believed to be killed with Brimstone and the others. However, Brimstone and Twiga killed her and Yasri and gleaned their souls, hiding them in different places. Issa's thurible went with Akiva, who gave it to Karou so as to resurrect the Naja. At first, Thiago is hesitant to allow Issa to remain there, as Naja do not have the wings that are needed by the chimaera army, but Karou talks him into keeping her, as she has resurrection experience. First appears in Daughter of Smoke and Bone.

Twiga: Twiga is one of Brimstone's assistants. He has a giraffe neck and spends the majority of his time cleaning teeth and banding the teeth together with silver for Brimstone's work. When Brimstone is to be killed, he requests that Issa, Twiga, and Yasri give up their bodies so that their souls can be gleaned and sent back to Karou. Twiga, however, refuses to leave his master behind and chooses instead to die with him. First appears in Daughter of Smoke and Bone.

Yasri: Yasri is Brimstone's cook. She has a parrot beak, but the rest appears to be human. In Days of Blood and Starlight, Issa tells Karou that Yasri raised her as much as the Naja did. She was believed to be killed with Brimstone and the others. However, Brimstone and Twiga killed her and Issa and gleaned their souls, hiding them in different places. Yasri's thurible awaits for Karou to regain in the rubble of the temple of Ellai where Madrigal and Akiva met every night. First appears in Daughter of Smoke and Bone.

Kishmish: Kishmish acted as Brimstone's messenger to Karou, sending her a note every time he wanted her to go on a mission for teeth. He is described as being like a crow with bat wings and a forked tongue. In the middle of Daughter of Smoke and Bone, Kishmish comes flying in at top speed on fire with his last note from Brimstone, requesting help. He dies in front of Zuzana as well as in front of Karou, so Karou is required to explain everything about the chimaera to Zuzana.

Madrigal: Madrigal was Karou's original form. She was of the Kirin species, meaning that she has large bat wings on her back, gazelle horns, and gazelle-furred legs with hooves from the knee down. She was sought out by Thiago for being "pure", meaning that she had never been resurrected, although her true love lied with Akiva. Thiago found Madrigal and Akiva in the temple of Ellai and had Madrigal beheaded in a public display. After the event, Brimstone gleaned her soul and made her new body on a string of human baby teeth, meaning that she was reborn as a baby and raised by Brimstone. Karou's memories of Madrigal are in both Daughter of Smoke and Bone and Days of Blood and Starlight.

The Warlord: The Warlord appeared briefly in flashbacks in Daughter of Smoke and Bone and Days of Blood and Starlight. The father of Thiago, he was established as the leader of the chimaera resistance during the war. He has the head of a stag but is otherwise human, and is still in his natural body. A thousand years ago he ignited the revolution of the chimaera in a brutal slave revolt. His gonfalon was stag antlers with leaves growing from them, symbolizing new growth. After the siege of Loramendi, The Warlord was personally killed by the emperor of the seraphim, Joram, and Thiago took over as the leader of the chimaera.

Chiro: Chiro was Madrigal's foster sister, as her family took in Madrigal when she was orphaned. Chiro is a member of the Sab tribe of chimaera, meaning that they possess a jackal head, caracal haunches, and bat wings. She has a deep envy of her foster sister for being mostly human. When Chiro was killed in battle and Madrigal resurrected her to be exactly the way she was before, Chiro lashed out at Madrigal for keeping the jackal head. She first appears in Daughter of Smoke and Bone.

Amzallag: Amzallag was one of Karou's first resurrections, filled with iron filings for strength and size. He is happy with his body and carries on. When Karou reveals the truth of the cathedral where the souls of the women and children are kept, Amzallag begs Thiago to take them there and glean the souls so that he may see his family again. Thiago denies him this and later kills him at the pit. Karou manages to glean his soul, however, before it is too late. He first appears in Days of Blood and Starlight.

Sveva: Sveva is the younger sister of Sarazal. She is of the Dama species of centaurid, based on the fallow deer. She believes herself to be the fastest chimaera alive, as she is the fastest Dama, and they are the fastest species of chimaera. She helps her older sister escape slavery and makes friends with the Dashnag boy Rath. First appears in Days of Blood and Starlight.

Sarazal: Sarazal is the older sister of Sveva and is therefore of the Dama species as well. When she and Sveva are on the run, she gets an infection in her leg from chains being too tight, and Rath carries her while unconscious. When she wakes up in a Caprine village and sees his head, she lets out a scream that gives away their location. Akiva pretends, however, that the scream was just a bird and saves them. First appears in Days of Blood and Starlight.

Rath: Rath is a Dashnag chimaera, meaning that he has the head of a saber-toothed tiger. He is an escaped slave that makes friends with Sveva and Sarazal when they are all slaves. When the three manage to escape, Rath meets up with the two Dama and offers to carry Sarazal so that they can make better progress. When Sarazal wakes up in a Caprine village, the first thing she sees is Rath's face. Terrified, she lets out a piercing scream. First appears in Days of Blood and Starlight.

Bast: Bast is a cat-type chimaera whose soul is, according to Karou, "delicate" and "ill-suited to a soldier". Her original body had the head of a cat and the body of a slender woman. Karou resurrects her into a much more animalian body, more muscular with paws for hands and leopard haunches. She was one of the few chimaera who thanked Karou for the new body the resurrectionist constructed. Bast tells Karou that Thiago has killed Amzallag, Tangris, and Bashees and to go to the pit, and Karou is unsure whether Bast was a "conspirator or pawn" to Thiago. First appears in Days of Blood and Starlight.

Razor: Razor is a member of Thiago's army and former Heth bone priest, meaning that he began with myrmecine traits. However, Karou had never seen a Heth before and ended up reconstructing him with a lion head. This caused him to attack her later, but Thiago threw him off. Every time he comes back from a mission he is carrying a bloody sack and has a smile on his face. First appears in Days of Blood and Starlight.

Ixander: Ixander is a bear-type centaur whose soul is, according to Karou, like a meadow. He and Ziri sparred outside and began laughing about the events that took place, which causes Karou to assume that everyone is happier without her. The truth, as it turns out, is that Thiago ordered them not to interact with her. He was made to be more powerful and winged and was on the expedition to the Hintermost, where he died. His soul was gleaned by Ziri in time, however. First appears in Days of Blood and Starlight.

Balieros: Balieros is a bull centaur. He is described as being very peaceable. He led an expedition with Ixander and Ziri. Thiago told the other chimaera that the expedition was to go to the Hintermost and help defenseless chimaera when in reality it was a raid, but Balieros took his group to the Hintermost instead. He was killed by seraphim there, but Ziri managed to glean his soul in time. First appears in Days of Blood and Starlight.

Tangris and Bashees: Known as the "Shadows That Live", these two sisters are black, sphinx-like chimaera that have the ability to disguise themselves using the glamour and silently kill whole legions of angels in their sleep. When they stand with Karou, they are killed by Thiago, but Karou manages to glean their souls in time. They first appear in Days of Blood and Starlight.

Haxaya: Haxaya is a fox-like chimaera that is known for her dark sense of humor. She and Madrigal were once friends, and now that Madrigal is Karou their relationship still seems to stand steady. When Ten is killed by Issa's snakes, Karou slits Haxaya's throat and moves her soul into Ten's body. She then acts like Ten until she, Karou, and the others can escape from the other chimaera. She first appears in Days of Blood and Starlight.

== Seraphim ==
Hazael: Hazael is the brother of Akiva and Liraz and member of the Misbegotten. When Akiva declares that he is going to kill Joram to free the seraphim and chimaera from this war, Hazael stands with him. After Joram is killed and the other soldiers, led by Jael, attack Akiva, Hazael, and Liraz, one soldier stabs Hazael in the heart. His soul is not collected in time and he is doomed to death. First appears in Daughter of Smoke and Bone.

Liraz: Liraz is the sister of Akiva and Hazael and member of the Misbegotten. When Akiva declares that he is going to kill Joram to free the seraphim and chimaera from this war, Liraz stands with him. After Hazael is killed, Liraz distrusts Karou when she says that without a thurible of the soul she cannot bring him back. Liraz stands bold and does not let her gender define her among the other Misbegotten. First appears in Daughter of Smoke and Bone.

Razgut: Razgut is a fallen seraph that clung to Izîl's back as part of the steep price of Izîl's wish. He demands to know more about Karou, and when his demands are becoming increasingly harder to disobey, Izîl flings himself off a cliff in the hopes of killing both of them. However, Razgut survives and goes back to Eretz to meet with the other seraphims, who make him whole again. Razgut then tells them what he knows about Karou as well as the chimaera secret of resurrection. First appears in Daughter of Smoke and Bone.

Joram: Joram is the emperor of the seraphim and father of the Misbegotten legion, his illegitimate children. These include Akiva, Hazael, and Liraz. His younger brother is Jael, leader of the Dominion. Joram was responsible for the destruction of Loramendi as well as the personal killing of The Warlord and Brimstone. In Days of Blood and Starlight he is killed by Akiva after stepping out of the bath in an attempt to bring about the end of war and peace in Eretz that Akiva and Madrigal dreamed of. He first appears in Daughter of Smoke and Bone.

Jael: Jael is Joram's brother-in-law and commander of the Dominion. He bears a scar across his face that interferes with his eating, drinking, and speech. When Joram is killed, Jael kills the next-in-line, Japheth, so that he can be the leader of all seraphim. Jael's plot is to get white gowns and harps for the seraphim, invade Earth, and trick the humans to their side -making the chimaera look like monsters for trying to stop him. He first appears in Days of Blood and Starlight.

Japheth: Japheth is the legitimate son of Joram and the Crown Prince of the Empire of the Seraphim. When Akiva kills Joram, Jael kills Japheth in order to be the emperor of the seraphim. He first appears in Days of Blood and Starlight.

Festival: Festival is the mother of Akiva. She is a Stelian, which are a race of seraphim that live in the Far Isles. When it was revealed that Joram killed her, Akiva's full rage ignited and he was able to kill the emperor. Though she was mentioned in Daughter of Smoke and Bone, she is not named until Days of Blood and Starlight.

== Humans ==
Kaz: Kazimir, more commonly referred to as Kaz, is a resident of Prague and Karou's ex-boyfriend. Karou commonly uses low-ranking wishes to exact her revenge on him, and when Karou disappears in a wild flight, Kaz enjoys the media attention that comes with it. First appears in Daughter of Smoke and Bone.

Bain: Bain is a hunter and frequent visitor to Brimstone's shop. He receives high payment for his frequent visits and numerous teeth per visit, although Karou hates him for his means of acquiring teeth. He first appears in Daughter of Smoke and Bone.

Izîl: Izîl is a graverobber who pulled out his complete set of teeth for the highest possible wish, a bruxis. He wished for and was granted profound knowledge that drove him into madness. Razgut the fallen seraph rode on his back and pressured him to reveal more about Karou. Izîl refused to the point of throwing himself off of a building to his death rather than succumbing to the wishes of Razgut. He first appears in Daughter of Smoke and Bone.

Mik: Mikolas Vavra, more commonly known as just Mik, is a talented Prague violinist and Zuzana's boyfriend. He helps Zuzana to find Karou in Days of Blood and Starlight and then stays with them for a short period of time before they are sent back. His violin amuses the chimaera. When Zuzana thinks that Mik will ask her to marry him, he tells her that there are still two tasks he must perform before that can happen. He first appears in Daughter of Smoke and Bone, but plays a larger part in Days of Blood and Starlight.

Esther: Esther is one of Brimstone's human associates, and considered by Karou to be on the less vile side. She provides the information to Karou in Daughter of Smoke and Bone that all the portals in the world have been burned by seraphim.

== Mythological ==
Nitid: Nitid is the main chimaera goddess. According to chimaera mythology, after her sister Ellai was raped by the sun, she shed tears that became the chimaera.

Ellai: The chimaera goddess of assassins and secret lovers. It was in her temple that Madrigal and Akiva met every night, and it was in the ruins of her temple that Yasri's thurible was hidden away. According to mythology, she was raped by the sun.

Zamzumin: According to seraphim mythology, Zamzumin was the last Gibborim, a race of hideous monsters. He became the ancestor and creator of the chimaera.

The Godstars: The serephim believed that there were once a race of bright warriors who traveled from their far away world to engaged in a long war with the Gibborim.

All but one hundred of them died but in the end they vanquished the Gibborim. These hundred were called the godstars, who were believed to bring light to the universe.
