= The Fold (novel) =

2008 novel by An Na

- Author: An Na
- Cover artist: Lori Thorn
- Language: English
- Genre: Young adult fiction
- Publisher: G. P. Putnam’s Sons
- Publication date: April 1, 2008
- Publication place: United States
- Media type: Print
- Pages: 280
- ISBN: 978-0-399-24276-2

The Fold (2008) is a young adult novel by An Na. It is her third novel following Wait for Me and A Step from Heaven.

== Plot ==
Joyce Park is a Korean teenager who just finished her junior year of high school. On the last day of school she asks her crush to sign her yearbook, who absentmindedly addresses her by the name of a more academically inclined yet ugly classmate. Determined to break out of her shell, Joyce sets about a journey of self-improvement along with the help of her best friend Gina. Hampered by her family, working in her family's restaurant, and struggling to stand out of her older sister's shadow, she is given a chance to have plastic surgery as a gift from her aunt, who has just won the lottery. If Joyce undergoes blepharoplasty, she will have rounder, Western-shaped eyes with a prominent eyelid fold, making her stand out from other Korean immigrants. But the idea of possibly having to experience pain sets her back on pursuing the surgery, and now she is left to decide whether the pain is worth the results or not.

== Reception ==
Common Sense Media called the novel “a beautiful, poignant coming-of-age story that is as real as the teen girl next door.” Kirkus Reviews gave a positive review with the comment “A lighthearted and thought-provoking look at a serious teen issue.”
