= Strange the Dreamer =

Fantasy novel

- First edition (US)
- Author: Laini Taylor
- Language: English
- Genre: Fantasy novel
- Publisher: Little, Brown (US); Hodder & Stoughton (UK)
- Publication date: March 28, 2017
- Publication place: United States
- Media type: Print (hardcover and paperback), audiobook, e-book
- Pages: 544
- ISBN: 978-0316341684
- Followed by: Muse of Nightmares

Strange the Dreamer is a 2017 young adult fantasy novel written by American author Laini Taylor and the first in the Strange the Dreamer duology, followed by Muse of Nightmares. The story follows Lazlo Strange, a war orphan and librarian in the world of Zosma who undergoes an expedition to the mystic lost city of Weep but discovers it is more than he believed it to be. It was published on March 28, 2017 by Little, Brown Books.

== Plot ==
Lazlo is an orphan by a war that struck his country, who was brought to a monastery by mysterious circumstances. He lives with a mundane existence with the monks, dreaming of finding adventure and uncovering lost cities. In his teenage years and early adulthood, he becomes an apprentice librarian. One day, he encounters a troupe of warriors led by Eril-Fane, the so-called Godslayer. Eril-Fane comes from the lost city of Weep, and is looking for people to help with an unknown problem. Lazlo manages to barter his way on the expedition along with the arrogant godson of Zosma's Queen, Thyon Nero. They encounter many oddities in their trip, and Eril-Fane tells the history of Weep: once a grand city, 200 years earlier it fell to so called gods. 15 years ago, Eril-Fane rose up against the gods and freed the city. Weep still struggles with aftereffects, the nature of which Eril-Fane refuses to reveal before they reach the city. When they do reach Weep, they find a giant floating Citadel shaped like an angel hovers over it. There are four large towers made of the same material as the citadel dropped around the edges of the city. Lazlo and the explorers meet the despondent citizens, who are frightened by the Citadel and the shadow it casts over the city. Lazlo learns more of the history of Weep. Years earlier, blue-skinned "gods" called Mesarthim came to the Seraphim worshiping city. Using their special abilities, magical gifts, they easily took over the city. The citadel was their home and is made of a strange blue metal known as mesarthium. Skathis, leader of the Mesarthim, seems to be the only one able to control the substance. They demanded young men and women be delivered to their citadel, and would return them days, months, or years later, wiped of memories from their time in the citadel. Eril-Fane is forced to spend years with Isagol, goddess of despair. He endures this until he finds his wife Azareen was taken as well. The humans managed to kill the Mesarthim and their spawn, but the Citadel never left.

In the Citadel, several godspawn, the children of the gods, have survived and live unbeknownst to the citizens of Weep. Minya, daughter of Skathis, saved four babies during the uprising. They have remained in the citadel for 15 years, supporting themselves using their gifts. Minya has the ability to tether herself to the dead and gains complete control over the ghosts she captures. Ruby can control fire. Sparrow can create growth, and decay. Feral can transport clouds and weather. Sarai, daughter of Isagol, struggles with her role. Under Minya's orders, she uses her power to infiltrate human dreams and torments them with nightmares of those they have lost. Sarai enters Lazlo's dream, but finds he can see her. They develop a quick romantic relationship as they share legends and fairy tales, manipulating their dreams to be blissful and wondrous. The other explorers attempt to find a way to take down the Citadel. One day, Nero discovers that Lazlo's spirit, an essence that flows alongside blood, has an effect on the strange metal. Nero manage to take a sliver from one of the spires on the ground. He confronts Lazlo, who notices that his skin develops gray streaks when in contact with the mesarthium. One of the other explorers, an explosions expert, tries to blow up the same spire. The spires have been keeping the Citadel upright, and it tilts downwards preparing to strike the city. The sudden shift causes the godspawn to tumble and Sarai is thrown off the edge. As the Citadel tumbles, Lazlo uses the mesarthium tower. His skin turns blue, revealing he is a godspawn himself. Lazlo is able to correct the citadel and bring the sky back to the city. He crafts beasts to carry him to the Citadel, but Sarai has fallen, impaling herself and dying instantly. She sits above her body as a ghost. Lazlo flies up to meet those who are within the citadel. Minya confronts him and after a battle of wills, she captures Sarai's ghost before it is lost forever. Minya gloats, knowing that now she has full control over both Sarai and Lazlo.

== Development ==
The novel was Taylor's first since Dreams of Gods and Monsters, the third and final book in the Daughter of Smoke and Bone series. The story was written several months after the prior novel had been finished. According to Taylor, the process of finding Strange the Dreamer came from "auditioning all the ideas that have been jostling for space in my head for years...I couldn’t decide...I kept vacillating....I chose the one with a heavy historical component and threw myself into research. Four or five months later, I had piles of notes but the story wasn’t really coming together and I panicked and jumped ship to the other pitch, which was a little more in my comfort zone, being fantasy." The most important aspect to Taylor was a focus on the characters' emotional arcs, with Taylor saying: "for me, it’s all about the emotional journey—or rather, all the characters’ interweaving emotional journeys and how they color each other."

== Reception ==
Strange the Dreamer was nominated for a Michael L. Printz Award for Best Novel in 2017. Kirkus Reviews took note that the novel explored "slavery, trauma, memory, and appropriation" with the conclusion that "lovers of intricate worldbuilding and feverish romance will find this enthralling." Publishers Weekly found the novel to be "gorgeously written in language simultaneously dark, lush, and enchanting", noting the third act's pacing as "love blossoms between two young people from warring factions, mysteries of identity develop, and critical events unfold in dreams."
