= Muse of Nightmares =

2018 young adult fantasy novel written by American author Laini Taylor

- Author: Laini Taylor
- Language: English
- Series: Strange the Dreamer
- Genre: Fantasy novel
- Publisher: Little, Brown Books for Young Readers
- Publication date: October 2, 2018
- Publication place: United States
- Media type: Print (hardcover and paperback), audiobook, e-book
- Pages: 528
- ISBN: 978-0316341714
- Preceded by: Strange the Dreamer

Muse of Nightmares is a 2018 young adult fantasy novel written by American author Laini Taylor, published by Little, Brown Books on October 2, 2018. The novel is a sequel to Strange the Dreamer and follows Lazlo Strange and the ghost of Sarai, a blue-skinned godspawn, discovering the secrets behind the city of Weep as they stabilize relations between the two worlds of humans and gods. The pair must contest with Minya, the oldest of the godspawn, as Sarai explores her dreams and realizes there is greater tragedy inside then she would have ever imagined.

== Plot ==
Immediately after the events of the first book, Lazlo meets the other godspawn and finds out that he is Minya's half-brother. Minya holds Sarai's ghost as an ultimatum for Lazlo to help her massacre the city of Weep in revenge for Eril-Fane killing their siblings.

At some unknown point in time, sisters Kora and Nova live in a fishing village and depend on each other for everything, including survival and the ability to stay resolute while the village's elders treat them cruelly and arrange forced marriages. One day, a giant ship floats over their land, and they rejoice in gods arriving to take them away. They are both taken and examined, but Kora is held by them while Nova is dumped out. Skathis, the ship's captain, indentures Kora and uses the metal mesarthium to turn her blue and awaken her tremendous powers. A vengeful Nova is arranged into a forced marriage but escapes the village, moving painstakingly through the ice to try to get to Kora and rescue her. Over time, Skathis and the gods turn to domination and use mesarthium as a resource to hold power above everybody else. They enslave more children and travel between worlds through portals in the air. Nova follows the trail through worlds over hundreds of years to recover Kora. It is revealed that the gods, once they arrived over Weep in the Citadel, raped men and women to create more gods, leading to the godspawn. Kora was killed in the massacre by Eril-Fane, who is Sarai's biological father, but managed to send her bird spirit and safely transport Lazlo away from the nursery.

Sarai looks into Minya's dream and sees the tremendous tragedy she faces every day, after witnessing many babies be killed by Eril-Fane while Minya was only able to carry the youngest children away and hide. Sarai, Lazlo, and the godspawn, who have formed a reluctant alliance with Eril-Fane and Azareen, find that hiding space, which houses a portal between worlds. Nova and other godspawn she befriended arrive to confront them but when she finds out Kora is dead, she is pushed into a murderous rage. Minya was previously given a sleeping potion by Ruby, but she wakes up and uses all of her power to send all the ghosts at Nova, which ends the battle. Nova tortures Eril-Fane and Azareen by killing them over and over again in a time-loop, bitter that Eril-Fane killed her sister. Sarai convinces Nova to stop, but the citizens of the Citadel are kicked out while Nova takes over. Lazlo is taken hostage by Nova and the Citadel vanishes into another world. Sarai and her companions use a flying contraption to follow them, where they rescue Lazlo. Nova kills herself by falling into an ocean full of beasts.

Afterwards, Minya begins to age normally because all the ghosts she was tethered to were let loose. Lazlo, the godspawn, and several of his explorer friends pilot the Citadel away into other worlds, hoping to find the other godspawns, that were sold by Skathis. Sarai hopes to find someone in one of the 100 worlds, who can make her a new body, because her soul is still tied to Minya (a tie-in to "Daughter of Smoke and Bone"). Eril-Fane and Azareen lead a new Weep and have a son, who they name Lazlo.

== Reception ==
Thea James of Tor.com praised the way that the "plot hinges upon a legacy of chaos and hatred...the struggle of the children, the younger generation that has survived this evil, to either carry on the legacy of pain and blood and death, or to supplant the agony that their parents wrought and live anew." Kirkus Reviews found the novel superior to Strange the Dreamer, noting the ways Taylor "dances between fantasy and sci-fi, indulging in gods, magic, alchemy, and lost desert civilizations" only to subvert these with "spaceships, interdimensional travel, and alien worlds"; the reviewer also realized that the novel could be seen as "ornate, emotionally charged, and poetic—or florid, overdone, overstuffed, and angst-y" depending on the reader. Author Katherine Webber called the novel "a philosophical fantasy adventure, an epic love story, a daring quest that demands to be read and reread and deserves to be remembered forever."
