= The Collectors: Stories =

2023 anthology of short stories edited by A. S. King

- Editor: A. S. King
- Language: English
- Genre: Young adult fiction
- Publisher: Dutton Press
- Publication date: 2023
- Media type: Print Hardcover
- ISBN: 9780593620281
- OCLC: 1362865154

The Collectors: Stories is an anthology of young adult short stories edited by A. S. King, published by Dutton Press in 2023.

== Stories ==
- Play House by Anna-Marie McLemore
- The White Savior Does Not Save the Day by Randy Ribay
- Take it From Me by David Levithan
- Ring of Fire by Jenny Torres Sanchez
- Museum of Misery by Cory McCarthy
- La Concha by e.E. Charlton-Trujillo
- Pool Bandits by G. Neri
- We are Looking for Home by A.S. King
- A Recording for Carole Before it All Goes By Jason Reynolds
- Sweet Everlasting by M. T. Anderson

== Reception ==
The book was awarded the Michael L. Printz Award in 2024.
