= In Darkness =

In Darkness may refer to:

== Film ==
- In Darkness (2009 film), a 2009 Turkish film
- In Darkness (2011 film), a 2011 Polish film
- I mørke (English: In Darkness), a 2015 Danish short film by Gustav Möller
- In Darkness (2018 film), a 2018 American film

== Music ==
- In Darkness (Agathodaimon album), 2013
- In Darkness (Varials album), 2019

== Literature ==
- In Darkness (novel), 2012 novel by Nick Lake
- Poet Anderson: ...In Darkness, a 2018 American novel by Tom DeLonge and Suzanne Young
