= Laini Taylor =

American fantasy writer (born 1971)

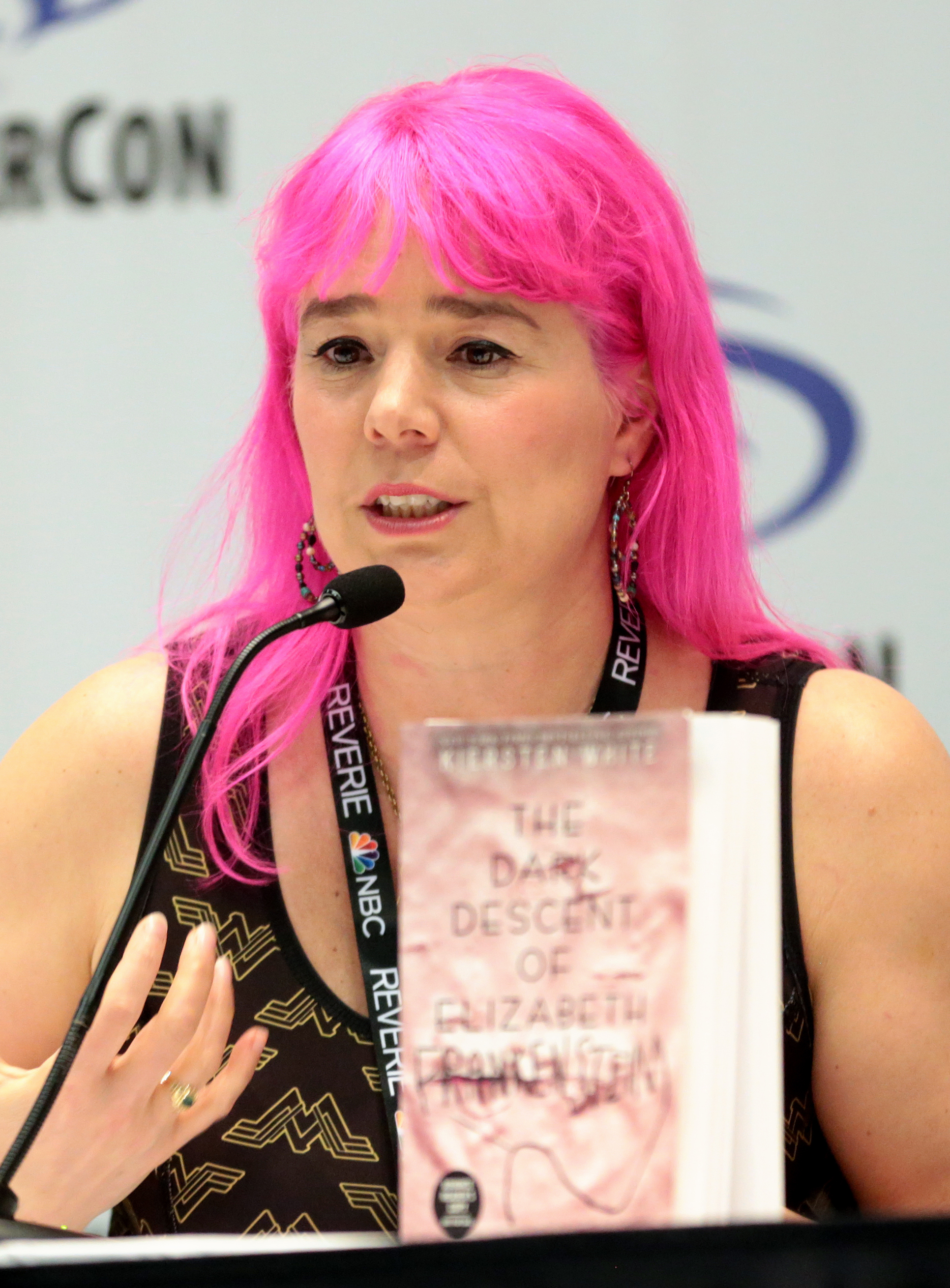
- Taylor in March 2018
- Born: December 11, 1971 (age 54); Chico, California, U.S.
- Education: University of California, Berkeley
- Occupation: Writer
- Spouse: Jim Di Bartolo (2001–present)
- Children: 1
- Writing career
- Period: 2004–present
- Genre: Young adult fantasy
- Notable works: Faeries of Dreamdark series; Daughter of Smoke and Bone; Strange the Dreamer
- Notable awards: Cybils Award (2009); National Book Award Finalist (2009); Michael L. Printz Honor Book (2018)
- Website: lainitaylor.com

Signature
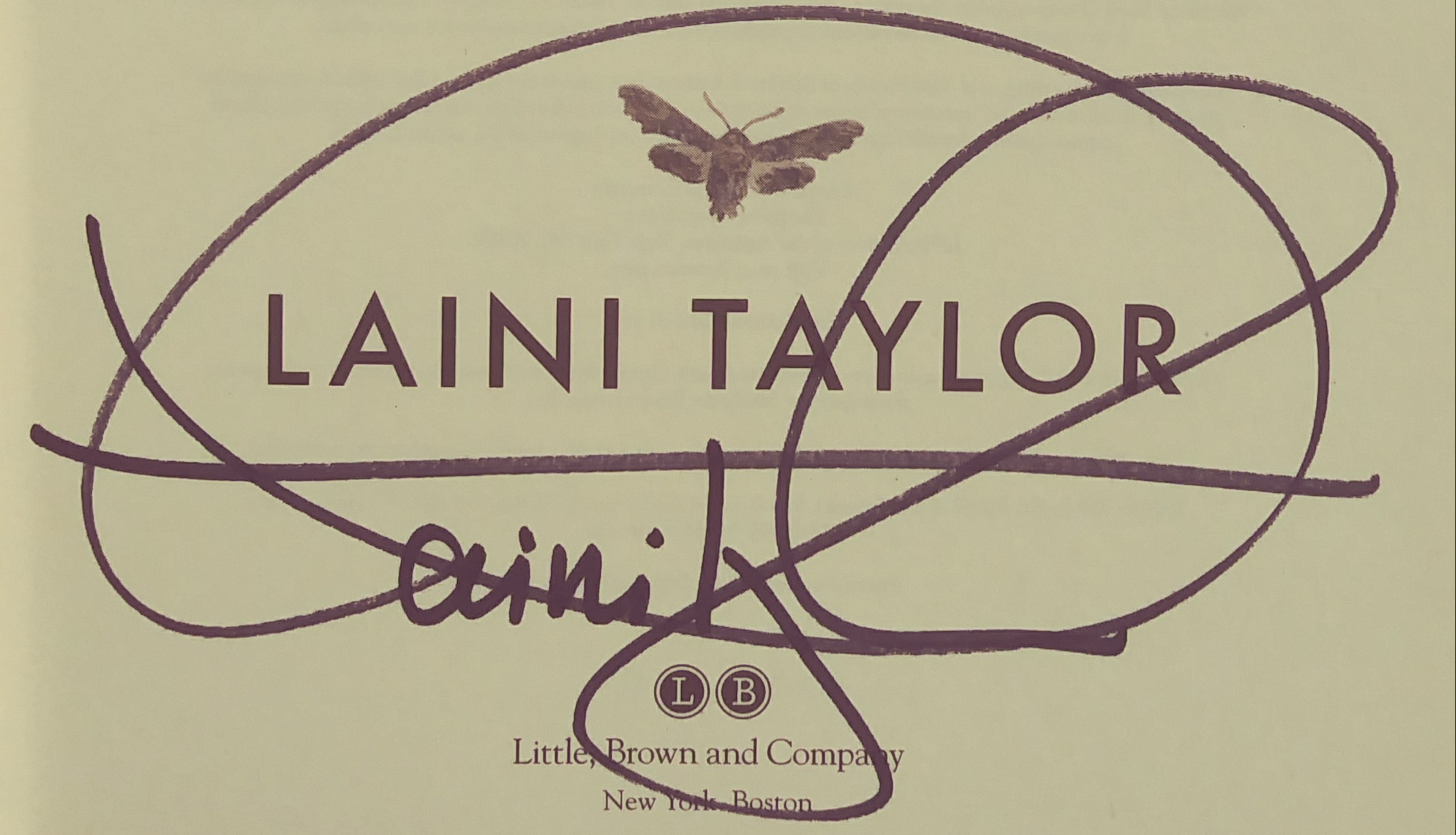

Laini /ˈleɪni/ Taylor (born December 22, 1971) is an American young adult fantasy author and a finalist for the National Book Award in Young People's Literature, best known for the Daughter of Smoke and Bone series, Strange the Dreamer, and Muse of Nightmares.

== Biography ==
Taylor was born in Chico, California, grew up as a US military kid in Europe and California, and earned her English degree from UC Berkeley. She currently lives in Portland, Oregon with her husband and daughter. She always wanted to be a writer, and was 35 before she finished her first novel.

== Career ==
In 2004, she wrote a graphic novel for Image Comics, illustrated by her husband, Jim Di Bartolo. Her first novel, Dreamdark: Blackbringer, was published in 2007. The sequel, Dreamdark: Silksinger, was a winner of the 2009 Cybil Award. In 2011, she published Daughter of Smoke and Bone, a young adult fantasy series. The first book in the series was chosen by Amazon as the Best Teen Book of 2011, and the sequel, Days of Blood and Starlight, was also on the list in 2012. In 2017, she published Strange the Dreamer, followed by its sequel Muse of Nightmares in 2018, in which protagonist Lazlo Strange, a scribe and polyglot, journeys to the Lost City of Weep. Taylor created a unique language for this world, which she weaves into the plot. Strange the Dreamer became a Michael L. Printz Honor Book as well as the 2018 Leslie Bradshaw Award for Young Adult Literature.

== Works ==
=== Faeries of Dreamdark ===
- Dreamdark: Blackbringer (2007) (Republished as Dreamdark: Windwitch in 2025)
- Dreamdark: Silksinger (2009)

=== Daughter of Smoke and Bone ===
- Daughter of Smoke and Bone (2011)
- Days of Blood and Starlight (2012)
- Dreams of Gods and Monsters (2014)
- Night of Cake and Puppets (novella) (2013)

=== Strange the Dreamer ===
- Strange the Dreamer (2017)
- Muse of Nightmares (2018)

=== Graphic novels ===
- The Drowned, illustrated by Jim Di Bartolo (2004)

=== Collections ===
- Lips Touch: Three Times (2009)
- "Spanking Robots" in Fractured Fables (2010)
- "Gentleman Send Phantoms" in Foretold: 14 Tales of Prophecy and Prediction (2012)
- "The Girl Who Woke the Dreamer" in My True Love Gave to Me: Twelve Holiday Stories (2014)
