= John Corey Whaley =

American author (born 1984)

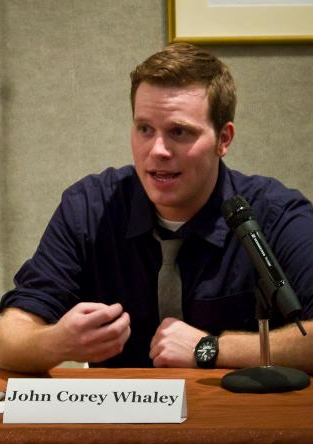
- Born: January 19, 1984 (age 42); Springhill, Louisiana, U.S.
- Occupation: Writer
- Writing career
- Period: 2010–present
- Notable work: Where Things Come Back NOGGIN Highly Illogical Behavior
- Notable awards: Michael L. Printz Award William C. Morris Award National Book Award Finalist

John Corey Whaley (born January 19, 1984) is an American author of contemporary fiction novels for young adults. His debut Where Things Come Back won the Printz Award from the American Library Association in 2012, recognized as the year's "best book written for teens." His second novel, Noggin, was a finalist for the 2014 National Book Award for Young People's Literature and was on Time Magazine's list of the 100 Best YA Books of All Time.

== Early life ==
Whaley was born and raised in Springhill, Louisiana, and attended Louisiana Tech University. He taught public middle and high school English for five years in his home state before becoming a full-time author.

== Education ==
Whaley holds a B.A. in English and an M.A.T. in Secondary English Education from Louisiana Tech University.

== Works ==
=== Where Things Come Back ===
Just when seventeen-year-old Cullen Witter thinks he understands everything about his small and painfully dull Arkansas town, his knowledge all disappears.

In the summer before Cullen's senior year, a birdwatcher named John Barling tries to validate the spotting of a woodpecker species thought to be extinct since the 1940s in Cullen's hometown of Lily, Arkansas. His attempts to find the Lazarus woodpecker bring a flurry of press and experts from all over the U.S. to the town. Cullen sees the town's preoccupation with the Lazarus woodpecker as an absurd carnival with John Barling as the carnival's crazy ringmaster. Nothing is more startling though for Cullen and the people of Lily, Arkansas than the realization that Cullen's 15-year-old brother Gabriel has suddenly and inexplicably disappeared.

While Cullen navigates his way through a summer of finding and losing love, holding his fragile family together, and muddling his way into adulthood, a young missionary in Africa, who has lost his faith, searches for any semblance of meaning wherever he can find it.

The novel explores themes of melancholy, absurdity, and the possibility of personal recovery. While centered on a specific central figure, referred to by the character Cullen as "that damn bird" the narrative examines broader concepts of second chances and the recurrence of past events.

=== Noggin ===
Travis Coates was alive once and then he wasn't.

Now he's alive again. Simple as that.

The in between part is still a little fuzzy, but he can tell you that, at some point or another, his head got chopped off and shoved into a freezer in Denver, Colorado. Five years later, it was reattached to some other guy's body, and well, here he is. Despite all logic, he's still 16 and everything and everyone around him has changed. That includes his bedroom, his parents, his best friend, and his girlfriend. Or maybe she's not his girlfriend anymore? That's a bit fuzzy too.

Looks like if the new Travis and the old Travis are ever going to find a way to exist together, then there are going to be a few more scars.

Oh, well, you only live twice.

=== Highly Illogical Behavior ===
Sixteen-year-old Solomon Reed is agoraphobic. He hasn't left the house in three years, two months, and one day, which is completely fine by him. Lisa Praytor, an ambitious seventeen-year-old, has her sights set on the second-best psychology program in the country (she's being realistic). Determined to "fix" Sol, Lisa steps into his world, along with her charming boyfriend Clark, and soon enough the three form an unexpected bond. But, as Lisa learns more about Sol and he and Clark grow closer and closer together, the walls they've built around themselves start to collapse and their friendships threaten to do the same.

== Awards and recognitions ==
The U.S. Young Adult Library Services Association recognized Where Things Come Back with the annual Printz Award that is open to all books published in the U.S. for young-adult readers. Naturally Whaley also won YALSA's award for new authors (debut books), the 2012 William C. Morris YA Award.

- Where Things Come Back was chosen as a Publishers Weekly Best Book 2011.
- Whaley was selected by the National Book Foundation as a Top 5 Under 35 Author for 2011.
- Whaley and Where Things Come Back are included on ABC Children's Group's New Voices 2011 Top Ten List for Teens.
- Whaley was named a Spring 2011 Flying Start Author by Publishers Weekly for his debut novel, Where Things Come Back, which also received a starred review from the publication.
- SIBA, the Southern Independent Booksellers Alliance, named Where Things Come Back as one of its Spring 2011 Okra Picks.
- In 2008, Whaley was also a semi-finalist for the 1st. Annual Amazon.com Breakthrough Novel Award.
- 2014 California Book Awards Young Adult Finalist for "Noggin"
- 2014 National Book Awards NOGGIN was a finalist for the National Book Award for Young People's Literature.
- In 2016 Highly Illogical Behavior was a finalist for the LAMBDA Literary Award in Children's and Young Adult Fiction.
