= Michael L. Printz Award =

Annual award for writing a book for young adults, from U.S. librarians

- Awarded for: the year's "best book written for teens, based entirely on its literary merit"
- Country: United States
- Presented by: Young Adult Library Services Association, a division of the American Library Association
- First award: 2000
- Website: ala.org/yalsa/printz

The Michael L. Printz Award is an American Library Association literary award that annually recognizes the "best book written for teens, based entirely on its literary merit". It is sponsored by Booklist magazine; administered by the ALA's young-adult division, the Young Adult Library Services Association (YALSA); and named for the Topeka, Kansas, school librarian Mike Printz, a long-time active member of YALSA. Up to four worthy runners-up may be designated Honor Books and three or four have been named every year.

== History ==
The Printz Award was founded in 2000 for 1999 young adult publications. The award "was created as a counterpoint to the Newbery" in order to highlight the best and most literary works of excellence written for a young adult audience.

Jonathon Hunt, a Horn Book reviewer, hopes that the Printz Award can create a "canon as revered as that of the Newbery."

Michael L. Printz was a librarian at Topeka West High School in Topeka, Kansas, until he retired in 1994. He was also an active member of YALSA, serving on the Best Books for Young Adults Committee and the Margaret A. Edwards Award Committee. He dedicated his life to ensuring that his students had access to good literature. To that end he encouraged writers to focus on the young adult audience. He created an author-in-residence program at the high school to promote new talent and encourage his students. His most noteworthy find was Chris Crutcher. Printz died at the age of 59 in 1996.

== Criteria and procedure ==
Source: "The Michael L. Printz Award Policies and Procedures"

The selection committee comprises nine YALSA members appointed by the president-elect for a one-year term. They award one winner and honor up to four additional titles. The term 'young adult' refers to readers from ages 12 through 18 for purposes of this award. The Michael L. Printz Award is sponsored by Booklist, a publication of the American Library Association (ALA).

- Non-fiction, fiction, poetry and anthologies are all eligible to receive the Printz Award.
- Books must have been published between January 1 and December 31 of the year preceding the announcement of the award.
- Titles must be designated 'young adult' by its publisher or published for the age range that YALSA defines as "young adult," i.e., 12 through 18. Adult books are not eligible.
- Works of joint authorship or editorship are eligible.
- The award may be issued posthumously.
- Books previously published in another country are eligible (presuming an American edition has been published during the period of eligibility).

== Recipients ==
The Printz Medal has been awarded for one work annually without exception. Only A. S. King has received the award twice, one for a single-authored book in 2020 and another as editor and contributor to an anthology in 2024.

Printz Award winners and runners-up
Year	Author	Book	Result	Ref.
2000	Walter Dean Myers	Monster	Winner	
2000	David Almond	Skellig	Honor	
2000	Laurie Halse Anderson	Speak	Honor	
2000	Ellen Wittlinger	Hard Love	Honor	
2001	David Almond	Kit's Wilderness	Winner	
2001	Carolyn Coman	Many Stones	Honor	
2001	Carol Plum-Ucci	The Body of Christopher Creed	Honor	
2001	Louise Rennison	Angus, Thongs and Full-Frontal Snogging	Honor	
2001	Terry Trueman	Stuck in Neutral	Honor	
2002	An Na	A Step From Heaven	Winner	
2002	Peter Dickinson	The Ropemaker	Honor	
2002	Jan Greenberg	Heart to Heart: New Poems Inspired by Twentieth-Century American Art	Honor	
2002	Chris Lynch	Freewill	Honor	
2002	Virginia Euwer Wolff	True Believer	Honor	
2003	Aidan Chambers	Postcards from No Man's Land	Winner	
2003	Nancy Farmer	The House of the Scorpion	Honor	
2003	Garret Freymann-Weyr	My Heartbeat	Honor	
2003	Jack Gantos	Hole in My Life	Honor	
2004	Angela Johnson	The First Part Last	Winner	
2004	Jennifer Donnelly	A Northern Light	Honor	
2004	Helen Frost	Keesha's House	Honor	
2004	K. L. Going	Fat Kid Rules the World	Honor	
2004	Carolyn Mackler	The Earth, My Butt, and Other Big Round Things	Honor	
2005	Meg Rosoff	How I Live Now	Winner	
2005	Kenneth Oppel	Airborn	Honor	
2005	Allan Stratton	Chanda's Secrets	Honor	
2005	Gary D. Schmidt	Lizzie Bright and the Buckminster Boy	Honor	
2006	John Green	Looking for Alaska	Winner	
2006	Margo Lanagan	Black Juice	Honor	
2006	Markus Zusak	I Am the Messenger	Honor	
2006	Elizabeth Partridge	John Lennon: All I Want Is the Truth, a Photographic Biography	Honor	
2006	Marilyn Nelson	A Wreath for Emmett Till	Honor	
2007	Gene Luen Yang	American Born Chinese	Winner	
2007	M. T. Anderson	The Pox Party (Octavian Nothing, Vol I)	Honor	
2007	John Green	An Abundance of Katherines	Honor	
2007	Sonya Hartnett	Surrender	Honor	
2007	Markus Zusak	The Book Thief	Honor	
2008	Geraldine McCaughrean	The White Darkness	Winner	
2008	Elizabeth Knox	Dreamquake	Honor	
2008	Judith Clarke	One Whole and Perfect Day	Honor	
2008	A. M. Jenkins	Repossessed	Honor	
2008	Stephanie Hemphill	Your Own Sylvia	Honor	
2009	Melina Marchetta	Jellicoe Road	Winner	
2009	M. T. Anderson	The Kingdom on the Waves (Octavian Nothing, Vol II)	Honor	
2009	E. Lockhart	The Disreputable History of Frankie Landau-Banks	Honor	
2009	Terry Pratchett	Nation	Honor	
2009	Margo Lanagan	Tender Morsels	Honor	
2010	Libba Bray	Going Bovine	Winner	
2010	Deborah Heiligman	Charles and Emma: The Darwins' Leap of Faith	Honor	
2010	Rick Yancey	The Monstrumologist	Honor	
2010	Adam Rapp	Punkzilla	Honor	
2010	John Barnes	Tales of the Madman Underground: An Historical Romance, 1973	Honor	
2011	Paolo Bacigalupi	Ship Breaker	Winner	
2011	Lucy Christopher	Stolen	Honor	
2011	A.S. King	Please Ignore Vera Dietz	Honor	
2011	Marcus Sedgwick	Revolver	Honor	
2011	Janne Teller	Nothing	Honor	
2012	John Corey Whaley	Where Things Come Back	Winner	
2012	Daniel Handler	Why We Broke Up	Honor	
2012	Christine Hinwood	The Returning	Honor	
2012	Craig Silvey	Jasper Jones	Honor	
2012	Maggie Stiefvater	The Scorpio Races	Honor	
2013	Nick Lake	In Darkness	Winner	
2013	Benjamin Alire Sáenz	Aristotle and Dante Discover the Secrets of the Universe	Honor	
2013	Elizabeth Wein	Code Name Verity	Honor	
2013	Terry Pratchett	Dodger	Honor	
2013	Beverley Brenna	The White Bicycle	Honor	
2014	Marcus Sedgwick	Midwinterblood	Winner	
2014	Rainbow Rowell	Eleanor & Park	Honor	
2014	Susann Cokal	Kingdom of Little Wounds	Honor	
2014	Sally Gardner	Maggot Moon	Honor	
2014	Clare Vanderpool	Navigating Early	Honor	
2015	Jandy Nelson	I'll Give You the Sun	Winner	
2015	Jessie Ann Foley	The Carnival at Bray	Honor	
2015	Jenny Hubbard	And We Stay	Honor	
2015	Andrew Smith	Grasshopper Jungle	Honor	
2015	Mariko Tamaki	This One Summer	Honor	
2016	Laura Ruby	Bone Gap	Winner	
2016	Ashley Hope Pérez	Out of Darkness	Honor	
2016	Marcus Sedgwick	The Ghosts of Heaven	Honor	
2017	John Lewis, Andrew Aydin, and Nate Powell	March: Book Three	Winner	
2017	Louise O'Neill	Asking for It	Honor	
2017	Julie Berry	The Passion of Dolssa	Honor	
2017	Neal Shusterman	Scythe	Honor	
2017	Nicola Yoon	The Sun Is Also a Star	Honor	
2018	Nina LaCour	We Are Okay	Winner	
2018	Angie Thomas	The Hate U Give	Honor	
2018	Jason Reynolds	Long Way Down	Honor	
2018	Deborah Heiligman	Vincent and Theo: The Van Gogh Brothers	Honor	
2018	Laini Taylor	Strange the Dreamer	Honor	
2019	Elizabeth Acevedo	The Poet X	Winner	
2019	Elana K. Arnold	Damsel	Honor	
2019	Deb Caletti	A Heart in a Body in the World	Honor	
2019	Mary McCoy	I, Claudia	Honor	
2020	A. S. King	Dig	Winner	
2020	Nahoko Uehashi with Cathy Hirano (trans.)	The Beast Player	Honor	
2020	Mariko Tamaki with Rosemary Valero-O’Connell (illus.)	Laura Dean Keeps Breaking Up with Me	Honor	
2020	Nikki Grimes	Ordinary Hazards: A Memoir	Honor	
2020	Geraldine McCaughrean	Where the World Ends	Honor	
2021	Daniel Nayeri	Everything Sad Is Untrue (a true story)	Winner	
2021	Eric Gansworth	Apple (Skin to the Core)	Honor	
2021	Gene Luen Yang with Lark Pien (color)	Dragon Hoops	Honor	
2021	Candice Iloh	Every Body Looking	Honor	
2021	Traci Chee	We Are Not Free	Honor	
2022	Angeline Boulley	Firekeeper's Daughter	Winner	
2022	Angie Thomas	Concrete Rose	Honor	
2022	Malinda Lo	Last Night at the Telegraph Club	Honor	
2022	Kekla Magoon	Revolution in Our Time: The Black Panther Party’s Promise to the People	Honor	
2022	Lisa Fipps	Starfish	Honor	
2023	Sabaa Tahir	All My Rage	Winner	
2023	Lily Anderson	Scout's Honor	Honor	
2023	A. L. Graziadei	Icebreaker	Honor	
2023	Sacha Lamb	When the Angels Left the Old Country	Honor	
2023	Eliot Schrefer	Queer Ducks (and Other Animals): The Natural World of Animal Sexuality	Honor	
2024	A. S. King (ed.), written by King, M. T. Anderson, E.E. Charlton-Trujillo, David Levithan, Cory McCarthy, Anna-Marie McLemore, Greg Neri, Jason Reynolds, Randy Ribay, and Jenny Torres Sanchez	The Collectors: Stories	Winner	
2024	Moa Backe Åstot with Eva Apelqvist (trans.)	Fire from the Sky	Honor	
2024	Kenneth M. Cadow	Gather	Honor	
2024	Shannon Gibney	The Girl I Am, Was, and Never Will Be: A Speculative Memoir of Transracial Adoption	Honor	
2024	Candice Iloh	Salt the Water	Honor	
2025	Samuel Teer with Mar Julia (illus.)	Brownstone	Winner	
2025	Safia Elhillo	Bright Red Fruit	Honor	
2025	Rex Ogle	Road Home	Honor	
2025	Lee Knox Ostertag	The Deep Dark	Honor	
2025	Andrew Joseph White	Compound Fracture	Honor	
2026	Cynthia Leitich Smith (ed.)	Legendary Frybread Drive-In: Intertribal Stories	Winner	
2026	T.L. Simpson	Cope Field	Honor	
2026	Adina King	The House No One Sees	Honor	
2026	Angeline Boulley	Sisters in the Wind	Honor	
2026	Maria van Lieshout	Song of a Blackbird	Honor	

== Multiple awards ==
As of 2025, only A. S. King has won the Printz twice; she also received an Honor. Marcus Sedgwick and M. T. Anderson have written one Award winner and two Honor Books. David Almond, John Green, Geraldine McCaughrean, Gene Luen Yang, and Angeline Boulley have written one Award winner and one Honor Book. Seven people have two Honor Books but have never won the Award: Margo Lanagan, Terry Pratchett, Markus Zusak, Deborah Heiligman, Mariko Tamaki, Candice Iloh, and Angie Thomas.

Six writers have won both the Printz Award and the annual Carnegie Medal from the British librarians: David Almond, Aidan Chambers, Geraldine McCaughrean, Meg Rosoff, Elizabeth Acevedo, and Jason Reynolds. Only Chambers and Acevedo have won both for the same book; Chambers won the 1999 Carnegie and 2003 Printz for Postcards from No Man's Land, and Acevedo won the 2019 Carnegie and Printz for The Poet X. In its scope, books for children or young adults (published in the UK), the British Carnegie corresponds to the American Newbery and Printz awards.

== See also ==
- List of ALA awards
- Newbery Medal — the first children's literary award in the world, inaugurated 1922
- Margaret Edwards Award – for outstanding lifetime contributions to young-adult literature
