= Carol Plum-Ucci =

American novelist

- Born: August 16, 1957 (age 69); Atlantic City, New Jersey, U.S.
- Occupations: Novelist, essayist
- Writing career
- Genre: Young Adult literature
- Notable work: The Body of Christopher creed

Carol Plum-Ucci (born August 16, 1957 in Atlantic City, New Jersey) is a young adult novelist and essayist. Her novel The Body of Christopher Creed won a Michael L. Printz Award in 2002 and was a finalist for the Edgar Allan Poe Award.

== Early life, education, and career ==
Plum-Ucci was born to Neil Plum, owner of Plum Funeral Homes and a funeral home singer, and teacher Ellen Ingersoll Plum.

Plum-Ucci grew up on the barrier island of Brigantine, New Jersey, where she attended public schools until the age of thirteen. She then went to Atlantic City Friends' School. She graduated from Holy Spirit High School (New Jersey) in 1975.

She received her bachelor's in communication from Purdue University in 1979. She was feature editor of the Purdue Exponent, and then a freelance writer in the Chicago area for several years. She worked for the Miss America Pageant in Atlantic City in 1984, and later for the Miss America Organization and Miss America Scholarship Foundation.

She has been a resident of Absecon, New Jersey.

== Novels ==
- The Body of Christopher Creed, 2000 ISBN 0-7868-1641-4
- What Happened to Lani Garver, 2002 ISBN 0-15-205088-4
- The She, 2003 ISBN 0-15-205453-7
- The Night My Sister Went Missing, 2006 ISBN 0-15-204758-1
- Streams of Babel, 2008 ISBN 0-15-216556-8
- The Fire will fall, 2010 ISBN 0-15-216562-2

== Awards ==
- 2007 Nominated for the Edgar Allan Poe Award for The Night My Sister Went Missing
- 2003 Nominated for Michael L. Printz Award for What Happened to Lani Garver
- 2001 Won the Michael L. Printz Award for The Body of Christopher Creed
- 2000 Won worst cliff hanger award for The Body of Christopher Creed
