= An Na =

American children's book writer (born 1972)

- Born: 1972 (age 53–54); South Korea
- Education: Amherst College (BA); Vermont College of Fine Arts
- Occupation: Writer
- Writing career
- Genre: Children's literature
- Notable works: A Step From Heaven (2001); The Fold (2008)
- Notable awards: Michael L. Printz Award (2002)

An Na (born 1972) is a South Korea-born American children's book author. She gained success with her first novel A Step From Heaven, published by Front Street Press in 2001, which won the annual Michael L. Printz Award from the American Library Association recognizing the year's "best book written for teens, based entirely on its literary merit". It was also a finalist for the National Book Award, Young People's Literature, and later found its way onto numerous "best book" lists.

== Life ==
Na grew up in San Diego, California, and has a Bachelor of Arts from Amherst College. Starting her career as a middle school English and History teacher, Na turned to writing novels after taking a young adult literature class while enrolled in an M.F.A. program at Vermont College of Fine Arts. She divides her time between Oakland, California and Warren, Vermont, and makes frequent visits to middle schools to talk about her works and encourages young Asian-American students to become artists and harness their creativity.

== Influences ==
Na admires the writing of her first writing teacher, Jacqueline Woodson.

== Works ==
- A Step From Heaven (2001)
- The Fold (2008)
- Akbar : The Great Emperor of India
- Wait For Me (2017)
- The Place Between Breaths (2018)
