= Everything Sad Is Untrue =

2020 young adult novel by Daniel Nayeri

Everything Sad Is Untrue: (A True Story)
- Author: Daniel Nayeri
- Language: English
- Genre: Young adult fiction, middle grade fiction, autobiographical novel
- Publisher: Levine Querido/Scholastic Corporation
- Publication date: August 25, 2020
- Publication place: United States
- Media type: Print (hardcover and paperback), e-book, audiobook
- Pages: 268
- ISBN: 9781646140008 Hardcover
- OCLC: 1249707429

Everything Sad Is Untrue: (A True Story) is a young adult/middle grade autobiographical novel by Daniel Nayeri, published August 25, 2020 by Levine Querido. In 2021, the book won the Michael L. Printz Award, Judy Lopez Memorial Award for Children's Literature, and Middle East Book Award for Youth Literature.

== Background ==
Nayeri has stated that Everything Sad Is Untrue is "entirely biographical" and that "the first version ... was a nonfiction essay for adults." Because "[t]he heart of the story was from the perspective of a pre-teen," he selected his pre-teen self as the narrator, "changed some names, and ... invented dialogue." Aside from these changes, however, Nayeri thinks of the book as a memoir.

Although he began writing the book in his twenties, Nayeri says he had been contemplating it since he was ten years old because, as an immigrant from Iran to Oklahoma, he often found himself explaining himself.

In terms of Everything Sad Is Untrue's guiding principle, Nayeri noted, "The book is immediately asking the reader not to lie to themselves. Not to dare believe they are any better. Not to omit themselves from the guilt. And from there it sets out to convince the reader that strictly speaking, all our memories are lies we tell ourselves."

== Content ==
Written in a conversational manner in the storytelling style of Scheherazade, of One Thousand and One Nights, with the author often directly addressing the reader or other people, it is the story of the experiences of Nayeri and his family as Iranian refugees in Oklahoma after his mother converted to Christianity—an illegal activity in the Islamic Republic of Iran. Life is full of challenges. Nayeri his mother and sibling live in a refugee camp in Italy for three years before being allowed into the US. He changes his name to Daniel because so many locals can't pronounce Khosrou. His mother, a doctor in Iran, works at a business cutting cardboard for business cards in America. His stepfather is abusive.

Isolated from Iran, his culture and his extended family, he realizes he has to "write down the memories and myths and the legends—and even the phrases and jokes. Or I’d lose everything. Maybe even the recipes."

== Reception ==
Everything Sad is Untrue was generally well-received, including starred reviews from Booklist, The Bulletin of the Center for Children's Books, Kirkus Reviews, Publishers Weekly, and School Library Journal.

In various reviews, the book was called "[m]esmerizing and hard-hitting," "a modern epic," "impressive,"

Booklist's Ronny Khuri noted, "Nayeri challenges outright what young readers can handle, in form and content, but who can deny him when it's his own experience on display? He demands much of readers, but in return he gives them everything," and ultimately called the book "[a] remarkable work that raises the literary bar in children's lit."

BookPage, The Bulletin of the Center for Children's Books, The New York Times, NPR, Publishers Weekly, Today, and The Wall Street Journal named Everything Sad is Untrue one of the best books of the year.

Awards and honors for Everything Sad Is Untrue
Year	Award/Honor	Result	Ref.
2020	Booklist Editors' Choice: Books for Youth	Selection	
2021	Booklist's Best Books for Tweens	Top 10	
2021	Christopher Award for Young People	Selection	
2021	Judy Lopez Memorial Award for Children's Literature	Winner	
2021	Michael L. Printz Award	Winner	
2021	Middle East Book Award for Youth Literature	Winner	
2021	Walter Dean Myers Award	Honor	
