= The Body of Christopher Creed =

2000 young adult novel by Carol Plum-Ucci

- First edition
- Author: Carol Plum-Ucci
- Genre: Mystery
- Published: 2000
- Publisher: Harcourt
- Pages: 276
- Awards: Michael L. Printz Honor Book Award
- ISBN: 978-0152063863
- Followed by: Following Christopher Creed

The Body of Christopher Creed is a young adult novel by Carol Plum-Ucci. It tells the story of a high school student whose life is unravelled when he tries to solve the mystery of a classmate's sudden disappearance. The novel won the Michael L. Printz Honor Book Award.

== Plot summary ==
Torey Adams moves to begins his senior year at Rothborne boarding school, while struggling with the recent disappearance of his former classmate Christopher Creed.

At school, Torey deals with friendship struggles and romance while trying to solve Christopher's disappearance.

As Torey learns more about Christopher, he realizes things are not as they seem.

== Major themes ==
The Body of Christopher Creed discusses the questionable nature of "reality" and the need to "be taken seriously". In the novel Torey says that every person in Steepleton has their own "version of reality" that "has nothing to do with what’s true" or what's not true. Torey's mother screams at him to "remain calm" instead of addressing the point that he made. Similar situations occur throughout the novel where the children try to address a point and the adults push it aside to avoid the reality of their once "safe world" as Torey explains.

Critics have said that The Body of Christopher Creed addresses the issue of the need to "blame others" when tragedy strikes.

== Bibliography ==
- Plum-Ucci, Carol (2001). The Body of Christopher Creed. New York: Volo. ISBN 0-15-206386-2.
