= My Heartbeat =

2002 novel by Garret Freymann-Weyr

- 2002 cover
- Author: Garret Freyman-Weyr
- Language: English
- Genre: Young adult fiction
- Publisher: Houghton Mifflin
- Publication date: 2002
- Publication place: United States
- Media type: Print Hardcover
- Pages: 160pp
- ISBN: 978-0-618-14181-4

My Heartbeat is a 2002 novel by Garret Freymann-Weyr, about a fourteen-year-old girl who discovers that her brother and his best friend, James, who she has been in love with for years, could be a couple. It was named a Printz Honor book in 2003.

== Plot summary ==
Ellen is a fourteen-year-old girl going into her freshman year of high school in New York City. She has been in love with her brother Link's best friend James for as long as he can remember. She is often invited to come along with Link and James to hang out and James says that when Ellen grows out of her crush on him, it will "break his heart." A friend from school asks Ellen what she thinks it's like that her brother and James are "like a couple." In order to understand the speculations that Link and James are “like a couple,” Ellen researches the topic of homosexuality. After her research, Ellen comes to believe that homophobic attitudes and behaviors are due to ignorance. Thus, Ellen concludes that being gay in a contemporary society should be accepted. Furthermore, her mother is okay with her son being gay. However, her father is not. Link denies being gay, but James tells Ellen that both of them might be, yet Link is scared of it while James is okay with it. James also reveals that he has slept with other men to make Link jealous. Link, James, and Ellen get into a big fight in which Link and James stop talking to each other, and Link gets a girlfriend, the older sister of the best friend who asks Ellen if she thinks if her brother and James are gay. College applications soon come and Link, the kid known for being smart, turns in his exams all blank. He ends up going to counseling, and makes it in everywhere he applied, but chooses Yale for their father, who was dying for Link to go there. Meanwhile, James and Ellen start dating, but when James's college applications return, Ellen finds out that he was planning on going to art school all along. James chooses a school in Germany where his mother went before going to law school, and for which he got a scholarship. They agree to break up before James leaves for Germany. Around Christmas, James, Link, and Ellen get together for a dinner in which they sort of make up their differences.
