= The Teacher of Nomad Land =

2025 children's novel about orphans in Iran during WWII

The Teacher of Nomad Land: A World War II Story
- Author: Daniel Nayeri
- Language: English
- Genre: Historical fiction War novel
- Publisher: Levine Querido
- Publication date: September 16, 2025
- Publication place: United States
- Media type: Print (hardcover)
- Pages: 192
- ISBN: 9781646145669

The Teacher of Nomad Land: A World War II Story is a 2025 children's historical fiction book written by Iranian-American author Daniel Nayeri set during the Anglo-Soviet invasion of Iran.

== Plot ==
After their father is killed, now-orphaned Babak and his younger sister Sana are separated and sent to live with relatives. Babak decides to escape with Sana to the Zagros Mountains, carrying his father's blackboard on his back. Intent on following in his father's footsteps as a teacher for the Bakhtiari, the two join a Bakhtiari caravan. Using the blackboard, Babak's first attempt at teaching fails, and the leader of the caravan tells him to return to Isfahan. While wandering through the mountains back to the city, the siblings run into a Nazi searching for a Jewish boy named Ben. They evade the Nazi and run into Ben, who is trying to reach Tehran so he can sail to Israel. Together, the three race to the city to help Ben escape, with Babak using the blackboard to communicate with others along the way.

== Reception ==
The book won the National Book Award for Young People's Literature in 2025, earned a Newbery Honor in 2026, Nayeri's second, and was named a best book of the year by Kirkus Reviews. Kirkus Reviews called the book "a compelling testament to the power of education", and the New York Times review complemented the authenticity of the characters, saying, "you can hear their breath when they speak". Both the New York Times and the School Library Journal commended the book's setting, with the Journal calling it an "artfully detailed setting".
