= Daniel Nayeri =

Iranian-American author

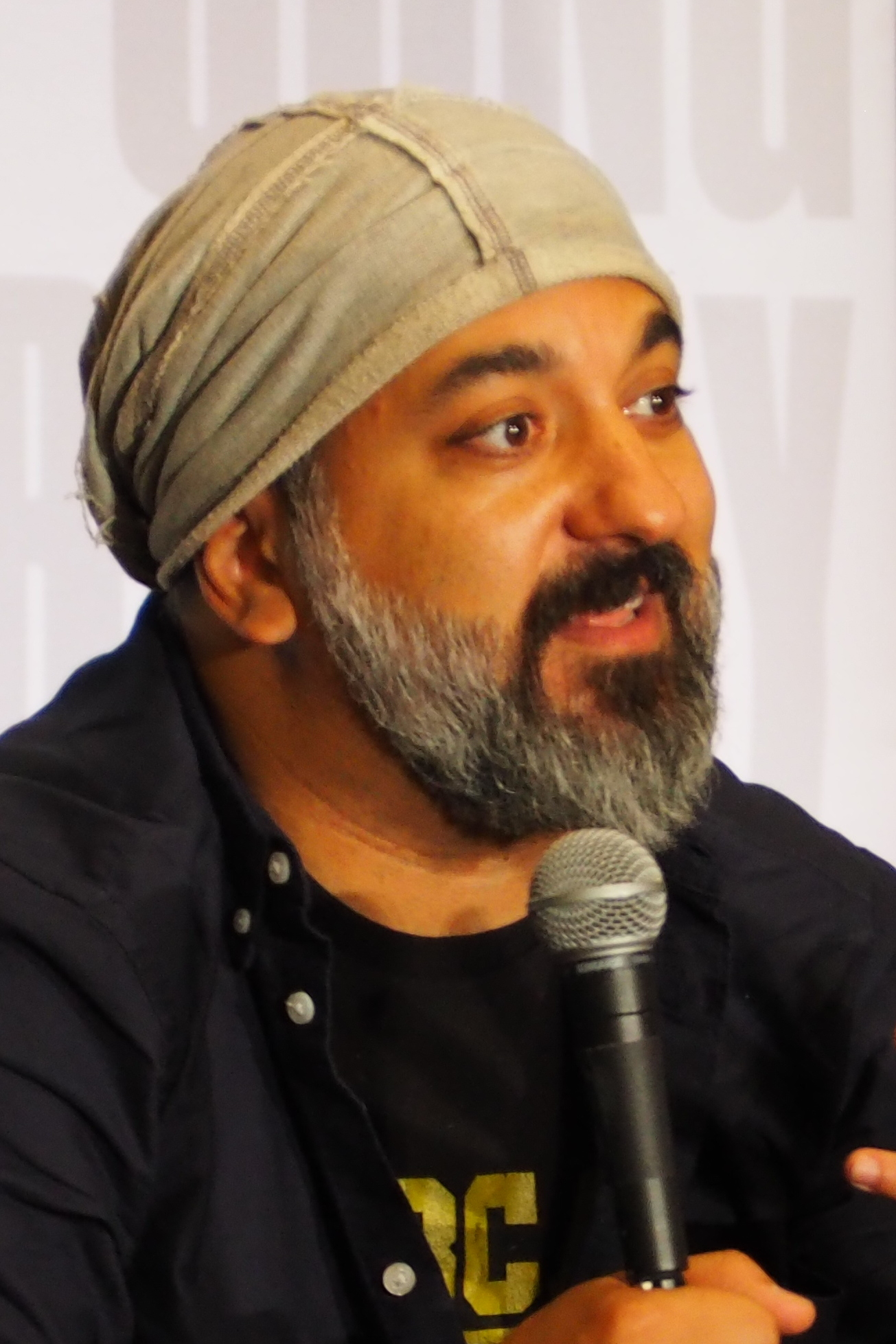
- Born: Khosrou Nayeri; Iran
- Education: New York University
- Relatives: Dina Nayeri
- Writing career
- Notable works: Everything Sad Is Untrue, The Teacher of Nomad Land: A World War II Story
- Notable awards: Michael L. Printz Award (2020); Walter Dean Myers Award (2020); Christopher Award (2021); Newbery Honor (2024, 2026)
- Website: www.danielnayeri.com

Khosrou Nayeri, known professionally as Daniel Nayeri, is an Iranian-American author whose works have earned the National Book Award and Newbery Honors.

== Biography ==
Nayeri was born in Iran and fled the country with his sister Dina, and their mother, a doctor, after a fatwa had been issued against her. They lived for three years in refugee camps in Dubai and Rome before settling in 1990—when Nayeri was eight years old—in Edmond, Oklahoma. Nayeri attended Edmond Memorial High School, and New York University, where he studied writing.

Nayeri was publisher of Odd Dot, a children's publishing group at Macmillan Publishers, before leaving in 2020 to pursue full-time writing.

Nayeri lives with his wife and son in New Jersey.

== Works ==
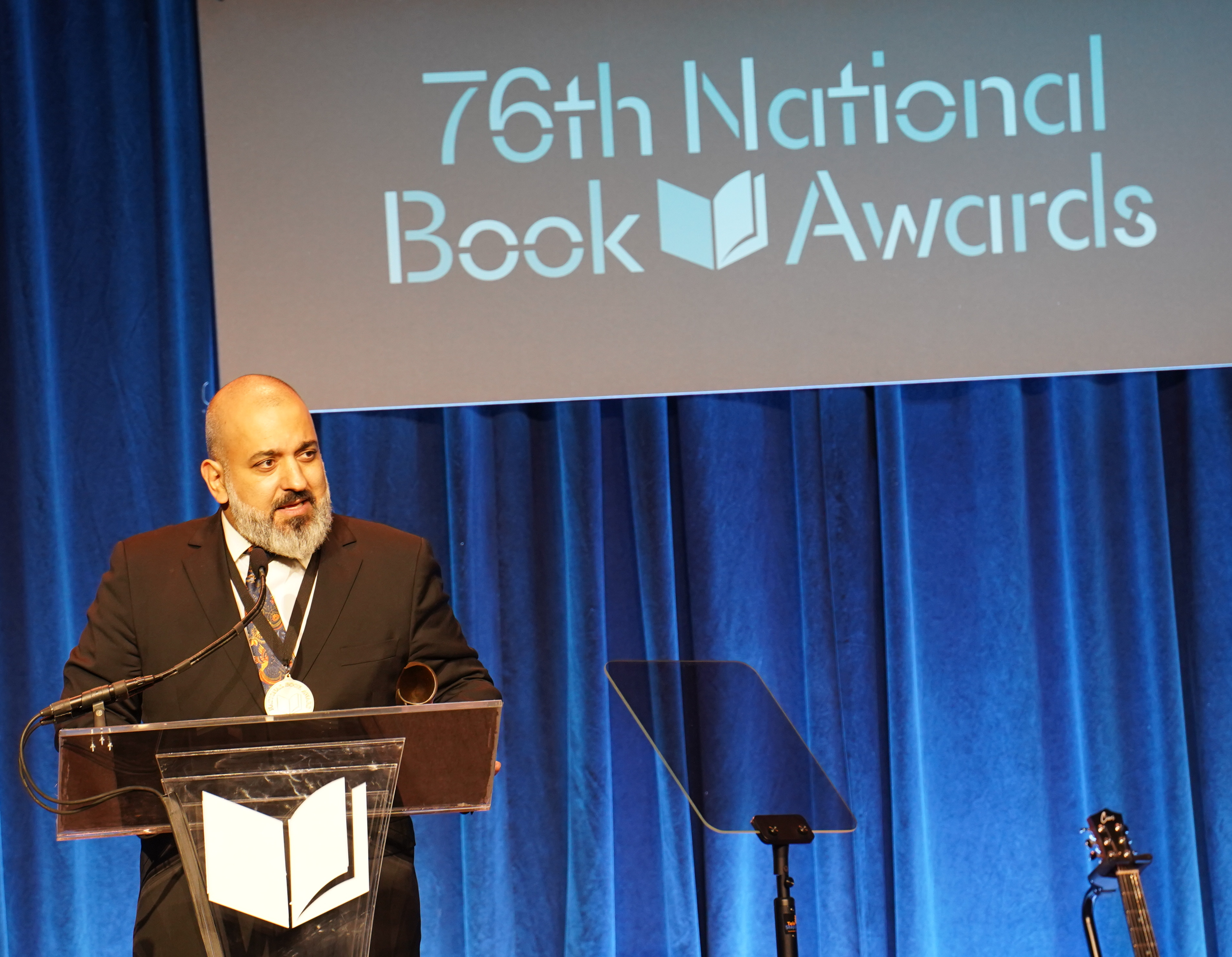
Daniel Nayeri at the 2025 National Book Awards

Nayeri's printed works include:

- Another Faust, 2009
- Another Pan, 2010
- Straw House, Wood House, Brick House, Blow, 2011
- Another Jekyll, Another Hyde, 2013
- How To Tell A Story, 2015
- The Most Dangerous Book : An Illustrated Introduction To Archery, 2017
- Sasha And Puck And The Cure For Courage, 2019
- Sasha And Puck And The Cordial Cordial, 2019
- Everything Sad Is Untrue, 2020
- Sasha And Puck And The Brew For Brainwash, 2020
- Sasha And Puck And The Potion Of Luck, 2021
- Mirror Town, 2023
- The Many Assassinations of Samir, the Seller of Dreams, 2023
- The Teacher of Nomad Land: A World War II Story, 2025
- This Is a Door, 2026

== Awards ==
In 2020, Everything Sad Is Untrue received a Michael L. Printz Award for best book written for teens, and was one of two honorees in the younger readers category for a Walter Dean Myers Award. In 2021, the book received a Christopher Award in the young adult category, and was a finalist for an Audie Award for Young Adult Title. In 2023, the book was nominated for a Young Reader's Choice Award.

Everything Sad Is Untrue was listed as one of the best children's books of 2020 by The New York Times, The Wall Street Journal, Today, and Booklist Editors' Choice.

In 2024, The Many Assassinations of Samir, the Seller of Dreams was selected as a Newbery Honor book.

In 2025, The Teacher of Nomad Land won the National Book Award in the category Young People's Literature. It was named a Newbery Honor book in January 2026.

This Is a Door is a Finalist for the 2026 Kirkus Prize for Young Readers' Literature.
