= Hard Love (novel) =

1999 book by Ellen Wittlinger

- Original paperback cover
- Author: Ellen Wittlinger
- Language: English
- Genre: Young adult novel
- Publication date: 1999
- Publication place: United States
- Media type: Print (Paperback); AudioBook
- Followed by: Love & Lies

Hard Love is a young adult novel written by author Ellen Wittlinger. It was published in 1999.

== Synopsis ==
John, who can be mean since his parents' divorce six years ago, and Marisol, who has recently come out as a lesbian, meet through their interests in writing zines, into which they pour their life stories. As the story begins, John wonders what it would be like to meet one of his favorite zine writers, Marisol. From her personal biography, she describes herself as a "Puerto Rican Cuban Yankee Lesbian." John meets Marisol at a magazine rack on a Saturday when he asks her for coffee. Over time they start to spend more time together and she teaches him the ways of the zine writer. After Marisol tells John that she likes him, he is very surprised. No one had ever told him that they liked him, and he falls in love with her. Marisol doesn't know how to let him down, without losing her new best friend. Throughout the story, John and Marisol try to keep their friendship intact through writing zines together.

While John is spending time with his divorced father, he starts to ask questions about Al, the man his mother is marrying. John gets angry and throws a tantrum. Seemingly childish, the outburst becomes a topic for his writing, which he asks Marisol to read, instead of discarding it as he usually would have. As the two friends share more about their lives, John begins to think about his own sexuality. He believes he might be straight, perhaps because he develops feelings for Marisol.

The pressure from John's friends to attend the prom leads him to ask Marisol, who is aware that John only wants to go as friends. At the prom, she is confused at John's desire to parade his heterosexuality to his friends. When John tries to kiss her, Marisol refuses. She yells at him, announcing that she is strictly lesbian, and that she thought he understood.

Regretting his actions, John assumes he will never see Marisol again. To his surprise, Marisol calls him and she does not seem mad. She asks him to a zine conference on the shore of Cape Cod, next to the Bluefish Wharf Inn. Marisol tells him that this is the chance to express his feelings to his parents about their relationships, so he does. John writes letters to his mother and father, mails his father's to him, leaves his mother's on the pillow, and heads to the bus station to meet with Marisol. One long bus ride later, they arrive at the conference surrounded by cabins and writers. John sees one of his favorite writers, Dianna Tree. As the weekend passes, Dianna and John develop a relationship while Marisol is off partying. Dianna sings a song for John called "Hard Love."

After the convention ends, Marisol plans to go live in New York with her friends, Jane, Sarah, and B.J. John is completely taken aback by Marisol's plans. He tries to talk to her before she leaves but, running short on time, she hurries away. John is left to sort through his relationship with his parents and finish his last year of high school.

== Characters ==
- John Gallardi Jr.: John is a 16-year-old boy, immune to emotion, partly because his father cares more about himself than John, and his mother is very emotionally distant due to his supposed resemblance to the aforementioned absentee father, who divorced six years ago. Quiet, reserved and intellectual, John is different from most of the boys in his high school because he isn't attracted to girls or boys. His best (and only) friend's name is Brian, who is very different from him. In his spare time, John likes to write zines about his life, including his parents' divorce.
- Marisol Guzman: Marisol is a lesbian who has accepted herself for what she is. She is short and wears what would be describes as gothic attire. She is a reserved person and doesn't like people to get too close to her; by choice, she has only a few close friends, notably Birdie, her close confidante and homosexual friend, and John. She writes 'Escape Velocity', a zine which John likes very much and which inspires their meeting. A surprising friendship develops between her and John.
- Brian: Brian is John's best friend, though they are both very different. Brian is interested in girls and is awkward around them. He ends up dating a girl named Emily, a freshman he meets while trying to make his existence known to Violet Neville, a girl he has been obsessed with for over six years but who he eventually turns from after finding she is rather shallow.
- Anne Van Esterhausen (John's mother): She was left by John's dad and is very lonely afterward. She usually sits in the dark and lets John do most anything. Dating Al changed her perspective on men. She doesn't show any love and affection towards John anymore since the divorce.
- Diana: She is a writer who likes John romantically though he doesn't notice.
- Al: He is John's stepfather and respects John as a man.
- John Gallardi Sr. (John's father): A self-centered man who doesn't care about anyone else's feelings but his, he takes John on the weekends. He left John's mom because he would have rather lived in the city than in a small town.
- Helen Guzman: Marisol’s mother is an accepting woman for the most part, but is still in denial at times about her daughter’s sexual preference; she joins gay friendly clubs in her community to cover it up.
- Jane, Sarah, Billy, Emily, and Birdie are all minor characters in the novel that are friends of John and Marisol.

== Critical acclaim ==
Publishers Weekly found Hard Love "somewhat overdramatized" but "The awkwardness of awakening sexuality, a growing preoccupation with identity, and crossing the line from friendship to more are all themes here with which teens will readily identify."

- Bulletin for the Center for Children's Books Blue Ribbon Book, 1999
- School Library Journal Best Book of 1999
- Booklist Editor's Choice, 1999
- School Library Journal Starred Review, 2000
- Booklist Starred Review, 2000
- Michigan Library Association Thumbs Up Award for Young Adult Novels, 2000
- Lambda Literary Award, 2000
- Printz Award Honor Book, 2000
- New York Public Library Books for the Teen Age list, 2000 and 2001
- International Reading Association Young Adult Choice, 2001
- Pennsylvania School Librarian’s Association list, 2001–02
- A YALSA Quick Pick for Young Adults, 2000
- A YALSA Best Book for Young Adults, 2000
- A YALSA Popular Paperback for Young Adults, 2002
- YALSA's 100 Best of the Best for the 21st Century, 1994–2003
- Nominated: Eliot Rosewater (Indiana) High School Book Award, 2001
- Nominated: Rhode Island Teen Book Award, 2001
- Nominated: Missouri Gateway Reader's Choice Award, 2001
- Nominated: Maryland Library Association Black-Eyed Susan Award, 2001–02
- Pennsylvania School Librarian’s Association list, 2001–02
- Finalist: Evergreen (Washington) Young Adult Book Award, 2002
- Nominated: Tennessee Volunteer State Book Award, 2003-04
