= Where Things Come Back =

2011 novel by John Corey Whaley

- Author: John Corey Whaley
- Language: English
- Genre: Young adult fiction
- Publisher: Atheneum Books
- Publication date: 2011
- Publication place: United States
- Media type: Print Hardcover
- Pages: 228
- ISBN: 9781442413337
- OCLC: 646113120

Where Things Come Back is a young adult novel by John Corey Whaley, published by Atheneum Books in 2011. It was awarded the Michael L. Printz Award and the William C. Morris Award in 2012.

== Reception ==
Abby O'Reilly of The Guardian praised the cover and called the book "such a unique read" and "accessible and fast paced". Angela Yuen of The Rumpus describes the book as "human" and "vulnerable" and calls it "tinged with absurdity and humor".
