= The Many Assassinations of Samir, the Seller of Dreams =

2023 children's book by Daniel Nayeri

- Author: Daniel Nayeri
- Illustrator: Daniel Miyares
- Language: English
- Genre: Adventure
- Publisher: Levine Querido
- Publication date: March 7, 2023
- Publication place: United States
- Pages: 244
- ISBN: 978-1-64614-303-0

The Many Assassinations of Samir, the Seller of Dreams is a 2023 children's novel written by Iranian-American author Daniel Nayeri and illustrated by Daniel Miyares. Set along the Silk Road, 12-year-old orphan Omar is bought by traveling salesman Samir, who tasks him as an assistant. The two head across the Taklamakan Desert with a caravan into Tajikistan, and Omar soon learns that Samir is a conman with many enemies set on killing Samir for his trickery. Omar bargains for his freedom in exchange for helping Samir stay alive.

== Reception ==
The book earned a Newbery Honor in 2024, and was named one of the best children's books of the year by Kirkus Reviews. The New York Times praised Nayeri's integration of the rich history and accurate portrayal of the varied cultures found along the Silk Road, and Booklist called it "a great story, beautifully told".
