= Candice Iloh =

Nigerian-American poet

Candice Iloh (stylized in lowercase as candice iloh) is a queer, first-generation Nigerian-American writer, poet, educator and dancer. Their debut novel, Every Body Looking, was a finalist for the National Book Award for Young People's Literature and Michael L. Printz Award honor book.

== Personal life ==
Iloh graduated from Howard University, where they studied public relations. In 2017, they received a Master of Fine Arts from Lesley University, where they studied Writing for Young People and Poetry. They completed residencies at VONA, The Home School via Lambda Literary, and the Rhode Island Writer's Colony.

Iloh's mother, Debrah, struggled with addiction throughout Iloh's life. She died of stomach cancer in 2018.

Iloh uses they/them pronouns. They presently live in Philadelphia.

== Career ==
At a poet, Iloh has performed nationally, including the Nuyorican Poets Café in New York City, the Reginald F. Lewis Museum in Baltimore, and the National Museum of African Art in Washington, D.C. They have also advanced to the final rounds in the following competitions: Graffiti DC Slam, Beltway Poetry Slam, and 11th Hour Poetry Slam.

Iloh's poetry has been published by Blackberry Magazine, Blavity, Fjords Review, For Harriet, TheGrio, Insight Magazine, and the Lambda Literary Foundation.

Iloh created a one-person show, Ada: On Stage, which debuted in 2018 at Hi-ARTS.

Iloh served as the Managing Editor of Quiet Lunch Magazine.

They have also worked as an educator and coach with Voices UnBroken, Split This Rock, and the American Poetry Museum. Through their work, Iloh has mentored young people in public school classrooms, athletic programs, detention centers, and youth shelters.

== Awards and honors ==
In 2013, Iloh received a fellowship from Voices of Our Nation Arts Foundation to work with Ruth Forman.

In 2016, they received the Lambda Literary Home School Fellowship, during which they studied under Cathy Park Hong. They were also attended the Rhode Island Writers Colony under the Artistic Direction of Jason Reynolds.

Later, they were a Writer-in-Residence at the Bronx Academy of Letters.

Awards for Iloh's writing
Year	Title	Award	Result	Ref.
2020	Every Body Looking	National Book Award for Young People's Literature	Finalist	
2021	Every Body Looking	Michael L. Printz Award	Honor	
2021	Every Body Looking	Rise: A Feminist Book Project	Top 10	

== Publications ==
Iloh's poetry has been published by Blackberry Magazine, Blavity, Fjords Review, For Harriet, TheGrio, Insight Magazine, and the Lambda Literary Foundation.

=== Books ===
- Break Fast From Her Skin (2014)
- In The Breakbeats Poets, Volume 2: Black Girl Magic Anthology (2018) ISBN 9781608468577
- Every Body Looking (2020) ISBN 9780525556206
- Break This House (2022) ISBN 9780525556237
- Salt the Water (2023)
