= The Carnival at Bray =

2014 young adult novel by Jessie Ann Foley

- Author: Jessie Ann Foley
- Language: English
- Publication date: October 2014
- Media type: Print (Paperback)
- ISBN: 978-0-9895155-9-7

The Carnival at Bray is a young adult novel by American author Jessie Ann Foley. The book was an Honor Book shortlisted for the American Library Association's Michael L. Printz Award for literary merit in 2015. The association's young adult division also named the book one of the 10 "Best Fiction for Young Adults" and had short-listed it for the 2015 William C. Morris Award for debut novels for young adults.

The manuscript had previously won multiple contests. It was published after being entered into a contest to solicit submissions to Elephant Rock Books, and became the first young adult novel published by the small independent publisher An earlier manuscript had won the Chicago Reader annual fiction contest.

== Plot summary ==
The heroine of the novel, Maggie, is a Chicago-born teenager, who has recently moved to Bray in County Wicklow in Ireland, just south of Dublin. She and her mother have a difficult relationship. Her mother has recently married an Irishman, after years of short relationships following her separation from Maggie's father. The book follows Maggie's difficult integration into Irish school and social life, her acquisition of a surrogate grandfather, her loss of a beloved but troubled uncle, and "escapes" from her home life to Dublin and Rome, tied into her love for the band Nirvana, culminating in two crises.

== Reception ==
Kirkus Reviews gave the book a starred review, saying "The narrative subtly and carefully interweaves peer and family drama...with the highs and lows of the grunge music scene, from the transformative glory of a Nirvana concert to the outpouring of grief around the death of Kurt Cobain."

Chicago Reader named Carnival of Bray on its list of favorite books of 2014, describing the book as "a lovely coming-of-age story set on the northwest side and in Dublin, which got its start five years ago as the winner of our annual fiction contest".

It was a finalist for the 2015 Chicago Writers Association Traditional Fiction Book of the Year.

=== Controversy ===
In 2022, The Carnival at Bray was listed among 52 books banned by the Alpine School District following the implementation of Utah law H.B. 374, "Sensitive Materials In Schools," many of which were removed because they were considered to contain pornographic material according to the new law, which defines porn using the following criteria:

- "The average person" would find that the material, on the whole, "appeals to prurient interest in sex"
- The material "is patently offensive in the description or depiction of nudity, sexual conduct, sexual excitement, sadomasochistic abuse, or excretion"
- The material, on the whole, "does not have serious literary, artistic, political or scientific value."

The book has also been removed from public libraries in Martin County, Florida.
