= Every Body Looking =

2020 young adult novel by Candice Iloh

- Cover of Every Body Looking
- Author: Candice Iloh
- Language: English
- Genre: Young adult literature
- Publisher: Dutton Books for Young Readers
- Publication date: September 22nd 2020
- Media type: Print (hardcover, paperback)
- ISBN: 978-0-52-555620-6
- OCLC: 1193992251

Every Body Looking is a young adult novel in verse by Candice Iloh, published September 22, 2020 by Dutton Books for Young Readers.

== Reception ==
Every Body Looking was well-received by critics, including starred reviews from Kirkus Reviews, Booklist, and Publishers Weekly.

Kirkus Reviews referred to the book as a "young woman’s captivating, sometimes heartbreaking, yet ultimately hopeful story about coming into her own." Teen Vogue called it "[l]yrical, insightful, and searing," and Buffalo News called it " a stunning debut."

Booklist wrote, "This debut is a testament to the beauty of Black girls, their circumstances, bodies, and cultures. A title to savor slowly, this is a captivating read, with even more depth imbued in the formatting and play with white space."

BookPage wrote, "Iloh movingly explores the concept of safety through Ada’s relationships with her parents, as well as in her evolving perspectives on money, potential careers and budding romantic crushes. Teen readers who long for more independence than adults are willing to grant them, or who long to be seen as individuals rather than vessels for adult influence and direction, will find many points of identification with Ada’s story."

The book also received positive reviews from The New York Times and School Library Journal.

Kirkus Reviews named Every Body Looking one of the best books of 2020.

Awards for Every Body Looking
Year	Award	Result	Ref.
2020	National Book Award for Young People’s Literature	Finalist	
2021	Michael L. Printz Award	Honor	
2021	Rise: A Feminist Book Project	Top 10	
