= Lily Anderson =

American novelist

- Born: December 15, 1988 (age 37)
- Writing career
- Language: English
- Years active: 2016–present
- Genre: Young adult fiction
- Notable work: Undead Girl Gang
- Website: mslilyanderson.com

Lily Anderson (born December 15, 1988) is a writer of young adult fiction, best known for her Indies Choice Book Award-nominated novel Undead Girl Gang.

== Early life ==
Anderson is an Afrolatina of Puerto Rican descent. She has been a Wiccan since she was eight years old. After she dropped out of college at age 18, Anderson wrote her first book and decided she wanted to become a published writer.

Anderson grew up doing theatre and is a self-proclaimed theatre geek, saying that she did her first Shakespeare play when she was 12 or 13 years old, which ultimately led to her writing both novels in her debut young adult series The Only Thing Worse Than Me Is You as retellings of Oscar Wilde's The Importance of Being Earnest and William Shakespeare's Much Ado About Nothing.

== Influences ==
She drew on her own experience as a Wiccan for her novel Undead Girl Gang, in which a teenage Wiccan resurrects her dead best friend. Other inspirations for the novel include dark comedy teenage obsessions of hers, namely the movies The Craft, Heathers and Death Becomes Her.

She names American screenwriter and director Shonda Rimes and American plus-size model Tess Holliday as the sources of some of her inspiration.

== Personal work ==
Anderson is an elementary school librarian and lives in Northern California.

== Bibliography ==
=== Messina Academy Duology ===
1. The Only Thing Worse Than Me Is You (St. Martin's Griffin, 2016)
2. Not Now Not Ever (Wednesday Books, 2017)

=== Standalones ===
- Undead Girl Gang (Razorbill, 2018)
- The Throwback List (Hyperion Avenue, 2021)
- Scout's Honor (Henry Holt, 2022)
- Big Bad, a Buffy the Vampire Slayer novel (Hyperion Avenue, 2022)

== Awards ==
Nominated

- 2019 Indies Choice Book Award for Undead Girl Gang
- 2022 Michael L. Printz Award Honor Book for Scout's Honor
