= Ellen Wittlinger =

American author (1948–2022)

- Born: 21 October 1948; Belleville, Illinois, U.S.
- Died: 17 November 2022 (aged 74); Williamsburg, Massachusetts, U.S.
- Occupations: Novelist, young adult fiction writer
- Writing career
- Genre: Young Adult
- Notable works: Hard Love, ZigZag, others
- Website: www.ellenwittlinger.com

Ellen Wittlinger (October 21, 1948 – November 17, 2022) was an American author of young adults novels, including the Michael L. Printz Honor book Hard Love.

== Early life and education ==
Ellen Wittlinger was born in Belleville, Illinois on October 21, 1948, to Karl and Doris Wittlinger. As a teenager, she often worked in her parents' store.

Wittlinger earned a Bachelor of Arts in art and sociology from Millikin University in 1970, after which she moved to Ashland, Oregon. Shortly after, she was accepted into the Iowa Writers' Workshop at the University of Iowa, from which she earned a Master of Fine Arts in 1973.

== Career ==
Wittlinger began her writing career after receiving fellowships from the Fine Arts Work Center. She published her first book, a poetry collection, Breakers, in 1979. She continued writing poetry and expanded to playwriting. Her one-act play One Civilized Person began as a character sketch at one of the Playwrights' Platform’s Saturday workshops and, according to The Boston Phoenix, "blossomed into a startlingly funny and terrifying work, a three-character play that never leaves the living room yet resonates far, far beyond." One of her plays won the author's prize at the annual Eastern Massachusetts Association of Community Theaters competition.

Wittlinger later worked as a librarian part-time with the Swampscott Public Library, which inspired her to focus her writing on children's and young adult literature. She published her first novel, Lombardo's Law, in 1993.

In addition to writing, Wittlinger taught at Emerson College and Simmons University.

== Personal life ==
While at the Iowa Writers' Workshop, Wittlinger met David Pritchard, whom she married in 1978. The two moved to Cambridge, Massachusetts following Wittlinger's graduation. The couple had two children: Kate and Morgan.

Wittlinger died from Creutzfeldt–Jakob disease on November 17, 2022, at the age of 74. Upon her death, Justin Chanda, the senior vice president and publisher of Simon & Schuster Books for Young Readers, stated,

To say that Ellen Wittlinger was a trailblazer is beyond an understatement. For decades she wrote engaging, searing books that never shied away from showing all facets of love, identity, and sense of self. She was an absolute pioneer of LGTBQ+ literature, a fierce advocate for all voices, and a genuinely warm and wonderful human being. She will be missed terribly, but her books will live on as will her legacy.

== Awards and honors ==
Six of Wittlinger's books are Junior Library Guild selections: Gracie’s Girl (2000), What's in a Name? (2000), Razzle (2002), Zigzag (2003), Heart on My Sleeve (2004), and Sandpiper (2005).

The American Library Association (ALA) has included multiple novels on their list of Best Fiction for Young Adults, including Hard Love (2000), What's in a Name (2001), Razzle (2002), Sandpiper (2006), and Blind Faith (2007). In 2008, the ALA also included Parrotfish on their Rainbow Book List and their list of Popular Paperbacks for Young Adults.

Awards for Wittlinger's writing
Year	Title	Award	Result	Ref.
2000	Hard Love	Lambda Literary Award for Children's and Young Adult Literature	Winner	
2000	Hard Love	Michael L. Printz Award	Honor	
2001	What's in a Name	Massachusetts Book Award	Winner	
2008	Parrotfish	Lambda Literary Award for Children's and Young Adult Literature	Finalist	
2009	Love & Lies: Marisol's Story	Ferro-Grumley Award	Finalist	
2009	Love & Lies: Marisol's Story	Lambda Literary Award for Children's and Young Adult Literature	Finalist	

== Selected bibliography ==
- Lombardo's Law. Houghton Mifflin Harcourt. 1993. ISBN 978-0-39-565969-4.
- Noticing Paradise. Houghton Mifflin Harcourt. 1995. ISBN 978-0-39-571646-5.
- Hard Love. Simon & Schuster Books for Young Readers. 1999. ISBN 978-0-68-982134-9.
- What's In a Name. Simon & Schuster Books for Young Readers. 2000. ISBN 978-0-68-982551-4.
- Gracie's Girl. Simon & Schuster Books for Young Readers. 2000. ISBN 978-0-68-984960-2.
- Razzle. Simon & Schuster Books for Young Readers. 2001. ISBN 978-0-68-983565-0.
- The Long Night of Leo and Bree. Simon & Schuster Books for Young Readers. 2002. ISBN 978-0-68-983564-3.
- Zigzag. Simon & Schuster Books for Young Readers. 2003. ISBN 978-0-68-984996-1.
- Heart on My Sleeve. Simon & Schuster Children's Publishing. 2004. ISBN 978-0-68-984997-8.
- Sandpiper. Simon & Schuster Books for Young Readers. 2005. ISBN 978-0-68-986802-3.
- Blind Faith. Simon & Schuster Books for Young Readers. 2006. ISBN 978-1-41-690273-7.
- Parrotfish. Simon & Schuster Books for Young Readers. 2007. ISBN 978-1-41-691622-2.
- Love & Lies: Marisol's Story. Simon & Schuster Books for Young Readers. 2008. ISBN 978-1-41-691623-9.
- This Means War!. Simon & Schuster Books for Young Readers. 2010. ISBN 978-1-41-697101-6.
- Local Girl Swept Away. Simon & Schuster Books for Young Readers. 2016. ISBN 978-1-44-058900-3.
- Saturdays with Hitchcock. Charlesbridge. 2017. ISBN 978-1-58-089775-4.
- Someone Else's Shoes. Charlesbridge. 2018. ISBN 978-1-58-089749-5.

== See also ==
- Phyllis Reynolds Naylor
