= Randy Ribay =

American writer

- Ribay in 2026
- Education: University of Colorado at Boulder; Harvard Graduate School of Education
- Occupation: Writer
- Awards: Freeman Book Award (2019) Asian/Pacific American Award for Literature (2025)
- Website: randyribay.com

Randy Ribay is an American writer of middle grade and young adult fiction. Among other awards, Ribay has won the 2019 Freeman Award from the National Consortium for Teaching About Asia and was a finalist for the 2019 National Book Awards for Young People's Literature category for his book Patron Saints of Nothing.

== Life ==
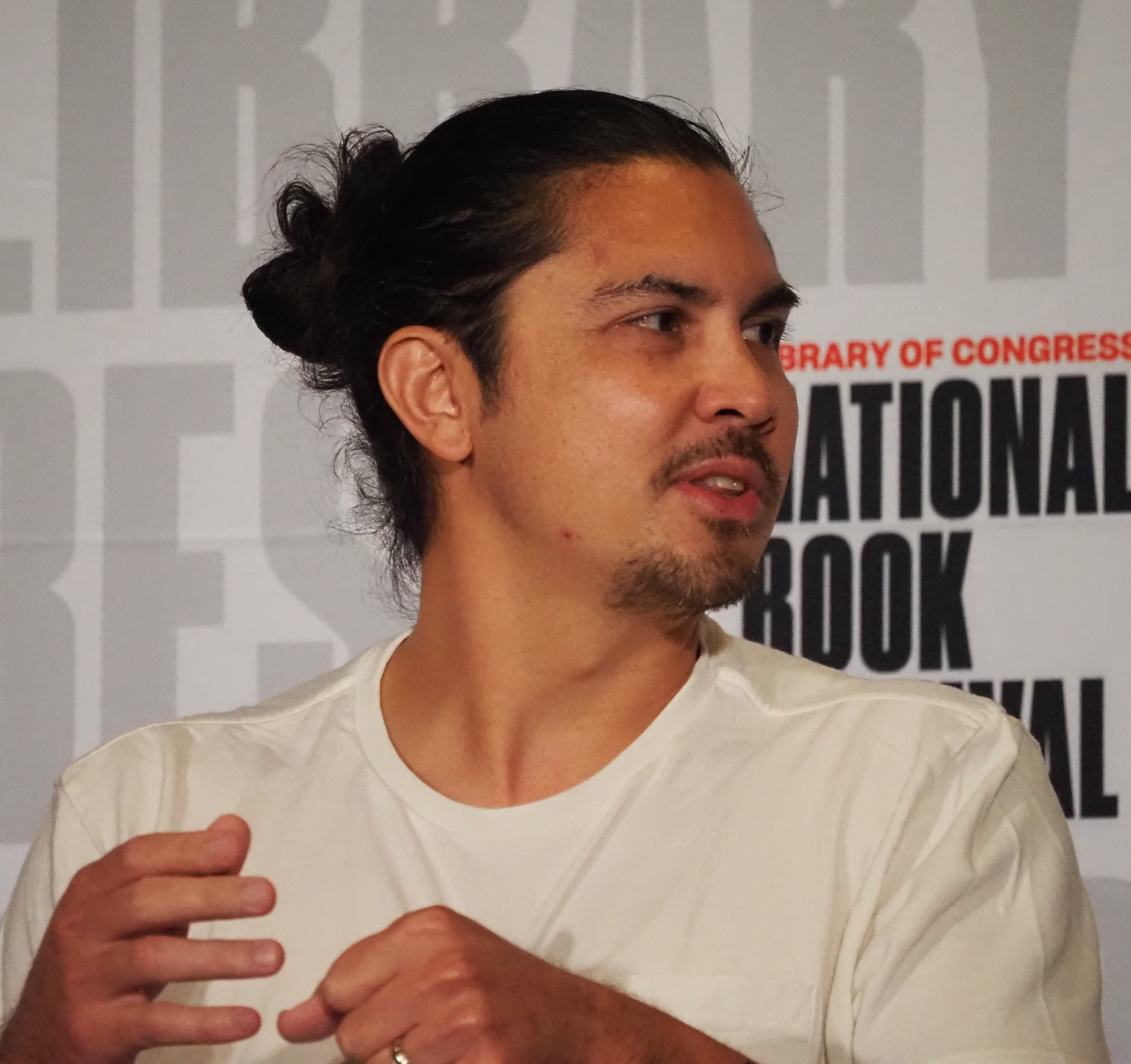
Ribay in 2026

Born in the Philippines and raised in the Midwestern United States, Ribay initially studied aerospace engineering, but later changed his major and earned a Bachelor of Arts in English literature from the University of Colorado Boulder. His master's degree was in language and literacy from Harvard Graduate School of Education.

Ribay teaches high school English in San Francisco, California.

He began his writing career by writing poetry but broke into the prose writing scene by participating in Pitch Slam at a Writer's Digest annual conference.

== Career ==
Ribay is the author of the award-winning book Patron Saints of Nothing (2019). Although initially rejected by several editors, the book won the Freeman Award and was shortlisted for the National Book Award for Young People's Literature in 2019. The book was also nominated for the 2020 Edgar Allan Poe Award for Best Young Adult Novel chosen by the Mystery Writers of America. Patron Saints of Nothing appeared on several Best of 2019 lists including those published by NPR, Kirkus, and the New York Public Library.

The book is a coming-of-age story about Jay Reguero, a Filipino-American boy of high school age. Reguero travels to the Philippines to find out the story behind a cousin killed in an ongoing drug war (based on Philippine drug war established by president Rodrigo Duterte). Once there, he must reevaluate his heritage and his status as a Filipino-American outsider. Ribay considered the book to be dedicated to the "hyphenated", referring to his Filipino-American heritage.

His 2024 novel, Everything We Never Had, was longlisted for the National Book Award for Young People's Literature. It won the Asian/Pacific American Award for Young Adult Literature in 2025.

In 2024, an anthology of short stories to which Ribay contributed, The Collectors: Stories, won the Michael L. Printz Award.

== Publications ==
=== Novels ===
- An Infinite Number of Parallel Universes (2015)
- "Horambe" A Hero (2016)
- Patron Saints of Nothing (2019)
- Avatar: The Last Airbender – The Reckoning of Roku (2024)
- Everything We Never Had (2024)
- Avatar: The Last Airbender – The Awakening of Roku (2025)
- Nest of Tongues (2026)

=== Short stories ===
- "3:00 A.M.: DIEGO SAKAY", in The Grimoire of Grave Fates, ed. by Hannah Alkae and Margaret Owen (Ember, 2023).
- "The White Savior Does Not Save the Day", in The Collectors: Stories, ed. by A.S. King (Dutton Press, 2023).
