= Dina Nayeri =

Iranian-American writer

- Born: 1979; Isfahan, Iran
- Education: Princeton University (BA); Harvard University (MEd, MBA); Iowa Writers' Workshop (MFA)
- Occupation: Novelist
- Relatives: Daniel Nayeri
- Writing career
- Genres: Literary fiction, Creative non-fiction
- Notable works: A Teaspoon of Earth and Sea (2013); Refuge (2017); The Ungrateful Refugee (2019)
- Website: dinanayeri.com

Dina Nayeri (born 1979) is an Iranian-American novelist, essayist, memoirist, and short story writer. She wrote the novels A Teaspoon of Earth and Sea (2014) and Refuge (2017) and the creative nonfiction books: The Ungrateful Refugee (2019), The Waiting Place (2020), and Who Gets Believed (2023).

== Early life and education ==
Nayeri was born in Isfahan, Iran. Her mother was a doctor and her father a dentist. She spent the first eight years of her life in Isfahan but left Iran with her mother and brother Daniel in 1988 because her mother had converted to Christianity and the moral police of the country had threatened her with execution. Nayeri, her mother and brother spent two years in Dubai and Rome as asylum seekers and eventually settled in Oklahoma, in the United States. Her father remained in Iran, where he still lives.

Nayeri received a B.A. from Princeton University, and an M.Ed. and M.B.A. from Harvard University. She also obtained an M.F.A. from the Iowa Writers' Workshop.

== Work ==
Nayeri's first novel, A Teaspoon of Earth and Sea, was published in 2014 by Riverhead Books (Penguin) and has been translated into 14 languages.

=== Refuge ===
Her second novel, Refuge, was published in 2017, also by Riverhead Books. Refuge is a semi-autobiographical novel whose chapters are written alternately from the point of view of Niloo Hamidi, an Iranian woman who emigrated to the United States and, at the time of the novel, is teaching anthropology at a university in Amsterdam, and Bahman Hamidi, her father, a dentist and oral surgeon living in Isfahan, Iran. Niloo's chapters relating her current life in the Netherlands are in the third person, as are Bahman's chapters, while flashback chapters about Niloo's four visits with her father in four different cities are narrated in the first person by Niloo.

The novel is partly about a father-daughter relationship and partly about the refugee crisis that is affecting all of Europe, with particular focus on the Iranian refugee community in the Netherlands.

When Niloo was forced to leave Iran with her mother and brothers, her father stayed behind. Niloo, who had a deep and joyous bond with her baba, was shocked by this and expected that he would join then. Bahman, however, went on to remarry, first a peasant woman with a young daughter, then, after divorcing her, a young and attractive woman. The novel starts with Bahman waiting for an audience with a divorce judge, a cleric, to obtain a divorce from his third wife. Bahman's third divorce constitutes the plot line of the chapters about present-day Bahman.

As attested by a personal essay published in The New Yorker, many of Niloo's circumstances and adventures, including the four visits with her father, are modeled closely on real events in the author's life. Unlike the author's real-life brother, Niloo's brother Kian is a chef (the New Yorker article indicates that the author's real-life brother is a businessman) and is not married. There is no mention of his having a romantic interest.

== Personal life ==
Upon reaching the United States Nayeri lived as a refugee, "in refugee hostels", for a number of years. When she was 15, in 1994, she became an American citizen, alongside her mother and brother. In 2001, she graduated from Princeton. In 2003, she married Philip Viergutz, a French citizen. She worked in New York City as a strategy consultant at McKinsey & Company and later as a strategic manager at Saks Fifth Avenue. She lived for some years in Amsterdam with her husband.

She had been living in London since 2015, but now lives in Scotland. She has a daughter and is divorced from her husband.

== List of works ==
=== Novels and books ===
- A Teaspoon of Earth and Sea (2013) ISBN 978-1594632327
- Refuge: A Novel (2017) ISBN 978-1594487057
- The Ungrateful Refugee: What Immigrants Never Tell You (2019)
- The Waiting Place: When Home Is Lost and a New One Not Yet Found (2020)
- Who Gets Believed: When the Truth Isn't Enough (2023)

=== Articles ===
- "The Ungrateful Refugee: 'We Have No Debt to Repay'". The Guardian, April 2017
- "My Father, in Four Visits over Thirty Years". The New Yorker, June 2017

== Awards and honors ==
- 2013: Barnes & Noble Discover Great New Writers Program: A Teaspoon of Earth and Sea
- 2015: O. Henry Prize: "A Ride out of Phrao " Alaska Quarterly Review, vol. 30, 2013
- 2016: National Endowment for the Arts Creative Writing Fellowship
- 2017: Finalist, American Academy in Rome Prize
- 2017: Longlist for The Morning News' Tournament of Books: Refuge
- 2018: Best American Short Stories for "A Big True", The Southern Review
- 2018: Winner, UNESCO City of Literature Paul Engle Prize
- 2019: Columbia Institute for Ideas and Imagination Fellow
- 2019: Finalist, Kirkus Prize, The Ungrateful Refugee
- 2019: Finalist, Los Angeles Times Book Prize, The Ungrateful Refugee
- 2020: Finalist, Elle Prix des Lectrices (France), The Ungrateful Refugee
- 2020: Winner, Geschwister Scholl-Preis (Germany), The Ungrateful Refugee
- 2020: Winner, Clara Johnson Prize, The Ungrateful Refugee
- 2023: finalist, National Book Critics Circle Award for Nonfiction, Who Gets Believed? When the Truth Isn’t Enough.
