= Stephanie Hemphill =

American author of books for young adults

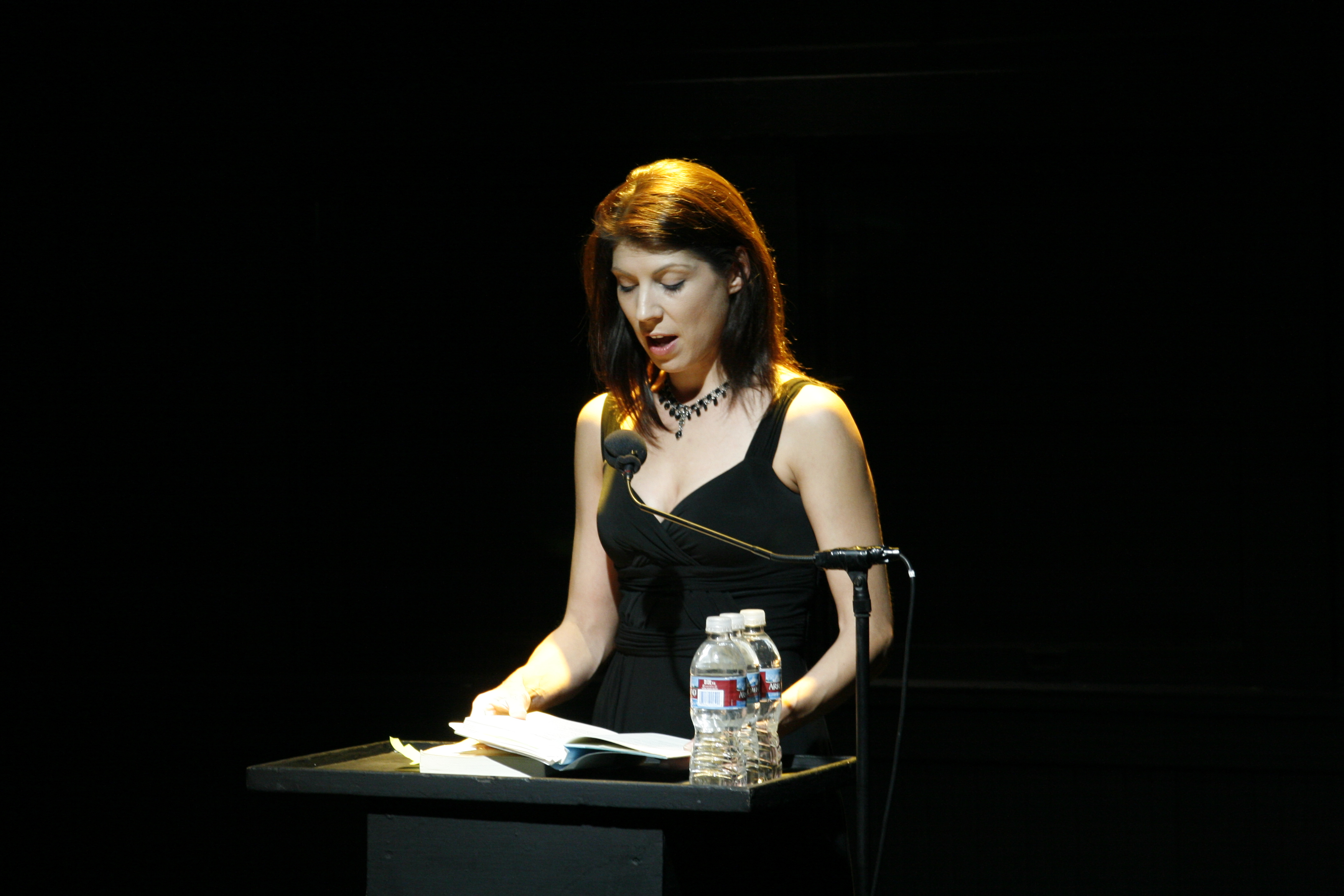
Stephanie Hemphill 2007

Stephanie Hemphill is an American author of books for young adults. She has lived in Los Angeles and Chicago.

== Biography ==
Hemphill grew up in Chicago and began writing at an early age, as part of the Young Authors afterschool program. Hemphill published poetry for adults first, but had always wanted to write for children. Eventually, she took a class at the University of California Los Angeles (UCLA) about writing children's poetry and the class inspired her to write her first novel.

== Work ==
Hemphill's first novel, Things Left Unsaid: A Novel in Poems (2005), is realistic fiction about a friendship between two girls which alternates between toxic and healthy. The characterization of the main characters was considered excellent and the pacing of the story praised by School Library Journal. The way that Hemphill writes Things Left Unsaid, according to Sara K. Day, allows the reader to become a confidante of the narrator, as if the reader is a friend, too. Things Left Unsaid won the Myra Cohn Livingston Award in 2006.

Hemphill won a 2008 Printz Honor for her book, Your Own, Sylvia, a novel in verse about the poet, Sylvia Plath. In working on Your Own, Sylvia, Hemphill shared that this novel faced many challenges, one of which was surviving the "censoring gauntlet of the Plath estate," but that she enjoyed writing about her because she loved Plath as an artist. Hemphill also felt a kinship to Plath during the time of her writing, since her marriage was ending and she was in the grips of being both overworked and depressed. She also worked in a manner similar to Plath, writing poetry every day, journaling and also writing to her mother, as Plath often did. The Chicago Tribune reviewed Your Own, Syliva, writing about the novel that "rarely is there such a striking and successful blend of literary form and subject." Your Own, Sylvia also won the Myra Cohn Livingston Award in 2008.

Hemphill's 2010 novel, Wicked Girls, is a free-verse historical novel of the Salem witch trials. Wicked Girls was a 2010 L.A. Times Book Prize Finalist. The Horn Book Magazine has singled out her novels in verse to highlight, calling the poetry in her 2012 work, Sisters of Glass, "elegant." In 2013 she wrote, Hideous Love, which is also written in free-verse is about the writer Mary Shelley. Hideous Love was considered by to be faithful to the history of Shelley's life, especially in imagining the difficulties of living under the principals of free love and "the compromises culture required of a woman of genius during the time period."

While Hemphill's novels received much praise from various sources others have been more critical. Reviewers for The Lion and the Unicorn called the verse in Your Own, Sylvia "doggerel."
