= In Darkness (novel) =

2012 novel by Nick Lake

- Author: Nick Lake
- Language: English
- Genre: Young adult fiction
- Publisher: Bloomsbury Publishing
- Publication date: 2012
- Publication place: United States
- Media type: Print Hardcover
- Pages: 341
- ISBN: 9781599907437
- OCLC: 738346546

In Darkness is a young adult novel by Nick Lake, published by Bloomsbury Publishing in 2012. The book tells the story of Shorty, a Haitian boy trapped in the ruins of a hospital after an earthquake, fighting for survival and drawing strength from a connection to Toussaint Louverture, a general in the Haitian Revolution.

== Reception ==
In a review in The Guardian, Patrick Ness described the book as "a serious, nuanced, challenging novel". A review in the Horn Book Guide praises the book's "unforgettable characters" and "timely and relevant themes".

The book was awarded the Michael L. Printz Award in 2013.
