= Dreams of Gods and Monsters =

2014 novel written by Laini Taylor

- First edition (US)
- Author: Laini Taylor
- Cover artist: Sammy Yuen
- Language: English
- Series: Daughter of Smoke and Bone
- Genre: Fantasy, young adult fiction, romance
- Published: 1 April 2014
- Publisher: Little, Brown (US); Hodder & Stoughton (UK)
- Publication place: United States
- Pages: 528
- ISBN: 978-0-316-13407-1
- Preceded by: Days of Blood and Starlight

Dreams of Gods and Monsters is a young adult fantasy novel written by Laini Taylor. It was published on April 1, 2014 by Hachette Book Group, an imprint of Little, Brown and Company. The book is the third in the Daughter of Smoke and Bone trilogy, following Days of Blood and Starlight.

The story continues where Days of Blood and Starlight leaves off, and concerns the invasion of Earth by the Seraph Empire and the alliance between the Misbegotten.

== Plot ==
After killing Thiago while defending herself from him, Karou puts Ziri's soul in his body and Haxaya's in Ten's body, allowing her to lead the Chimaera. When Zuzana and Mick come bearing news of Jael's arrival on Earth, the new Chimaera leadership is able to negotiate an alliance with the Misbegotten. They have to learn to make peace and to not wipe each other out if they are to work together against the Dominion.

Eliza Jones is a 24-year-old researcher in Washington, D.C., where she is working on her Ph.D. As a girl, she escaped a cult that worshipped her as a prophet and descendant of the angel Elazael. She has visions in her dreams of monsters coming from the sky. When the recently abandoned camp of the Chimaeragg in Morocco is found and the pit is excavated, her boss is called in to analyse it, and she travels with him. Seeing the corpses of the Chimaera triggers more visions.

Jael has arrived with his soldiers, the Dominion, in Vatican City. Aided by Razgut, he portrays his forces as the angels from human mythology and asks humanity for help defeating devils; once he is armed with modern human technology, he intends to wipe out the Stelians.

Akiva is discovered by Stelian emissaries who, following his accidental disruption of the fabric of the universe while casting a spell, intend to kill him. They realise he is the child of Festival, and follow him invisibly. Ziri, as Thiago, rescues Liraz from Haxaya, whom Liraz had killed an earlier incarnation of. Akiva figures out how to make the seraph soldiers invulnerable to the effects of Chimaera hamsas. The allied army travels to the portal to stop the Dominion, but are ambushed on the way, and Ziri and Liraz are presumed dead.

On Earth, Karou, Akiva, Zuzana, Mik, and a Chimaera soldier discover Eliza, speaking prophecies in Seraphim, on their way to the Vatican. They are assisted by Esther, until she sells them out to Jael in exchange for the mining rights to Eretz. Esther throws Zuzana and Mik out of her hotel room, but they steal the stash of wishes given to her by Brimstone.

Karou and Akiva attempt to infiltrate Jael's lodgings, but are expected. However, using the same spell Akiva used to synchronise the burning of Brimstone's portals, they are able to set an incendiary charge on Jael and force him to return to Eretz unarmed. Zuzana and Mik wish for Eliza to be returned to her best possible self, and she regains her memories as Elazael and transforms into a Seraphim.

In Eretz, the Misbegotten and Chimera alliance has managed to convert the rest of the armed forces to their cause, and upon returning Jael is imprisoned. Ziri has died, but Liraz has gleaned his soul, and he is resurrected. Eliza, Mik, and Zuzana return to Eretz through another portal known to Elazael.

The Stelians arrive to confront Akiva, whose magic has been damaging the fabric of the universe, endangering Eretz. Eliza tells the history of Eretz and reveals that the creation myth the Seraphim have involving "Godstars" is in fact a prophecy, and they are destined to battle the beasts that threaten Eretz together.

== Critical reception ==
Publishers Weekly gave Dreams of Gods and Monsters a starred review. Kirkus Reviews praised Taylor's "poetically intense language," and called it "an ambitious, gorgeously edgy drama."
