= E.E. Charlton-Trujillo =

American novelist

e.E. Charlton-Trujillo is a Mexican-American filmmaker and novelist.

== Biography ==
Charlton-Trujillo attended Texas A&M University-Corpus Christi, and did graduate work in film at Ohio University. While there, she wrote her first play, Bellies and Seeds the film Passing Through. They also was the recipient of I. Hollis Perry-Billman and the Betty Thomas Filmmaking Awards for their thesis film Cielto Liendo (Pretty Sky).

She then moved to New York City as an intern at Killer Films. Later, living in Wisconsin, she finished her first novel Prizefighter En Mi Casa, which won the Delacorte Dell Yearling Award, as well as the Parents' Choice Silver Honor for 'giving life —sadness, hope and despair to a Mexican family living in a small town in south Texas.' her second book, Feels Like Home, was written the following year.

After living in Ohio for several years, Charlton-Trujillo released her third novel, Fat Angie, in March 2013. It received praise from authors Gregory Maguire (Wicked), Ellen Hopkins (Crank), Pat Schmatz (Blue Fish) and Jo Knowles (Harry's Place). Fat Angie was named a winner of the Stonewall Book Award in 2014.

In August 2016 Candlewick Press at the author's request indefinitely delayed publication of their novel in verse When We Was Fierce following criticism from early readers over concerns of its use of an invented black vernacular.

In April 2018, Charlton-Trujillo was part of a panel at the Texas Library Association Conference titled "Author, Please Come! Never Mind. Please Don't" where authors shared their experiences of being invited to speak at literary events only to have their invitations rescinded. Also part of the panel were authors Ellen Hopkins and Gayle Pitman.

In 2023, she contributed to the anthology of short stories The Collectors: Stories. In 2024, the collection won the Michael L. Printz Award.

== Feature films ==
- A Culture of Silence (Director)
- At-Risk Summer (Director)
- HOME (Executive Producer)
- Night Fliers (Editor)
- Revelation Trail (Casting)

== Short films directed ==
- A Handful of Pennies
- Bubbly
- Living Under Linda's Desk
- Vanessa Rising
- Office Beast
- Cielto Lindo
- Passing Through
- everything but water

== Music videos ==
- Shiny and the Spoon "Take On Me"
- Magnolia Mountain "Don't Leave Just Now"
- Shiny and the Spoon "Bread and Butter"

== Novels ==
- Prizefighter En Mi Casa, 2006
- Feels Like Home, 2007
- Fat Angie, 2013
- Fat Angie: Rebel Girl Revolution, 2019
- Fat Angie: Homecoming, 2020

== Picture books ==
- Lupe Lopez: Rock Star Rules, June 2022
- A Girl Can Build Anything, April 2023
- Lupe Lopez: Reading Rock Star, June 2023
