= A Step From Heaven =

2001 novel by An Na

- Author: An Na
- Language: English
- Genre: Young adult novel
- Publisher: Front Street Press
- Publication date: 2001
- Publication place: United States
- Media type: Print (hardback & paperback)
- Pages: 156
- ISBN: 1-886910-58-8
- OCLC: 44703366
- LC Class: PZ7.N1243 St 2001

A Step From Heaven is the first novel by An Na, published in 2001 by Front Street Press. It won two American Library Association awards: the 2002 Michael L. Printz Award from the Young Adult Library Services Association and the 2001-2003 Asian/Pacific American Award for Literature (Children and Young Adult Author category) from the Asian Pacific American Librarians Association.

== Summary ==
At age four, Young Ju moves with her parents from Korea to Southern California. While expecting an easy, blissful life in America, Young Ju sees the stress that the cultural adjustment puts on her family. She struggles with the language barrier in her new school as her parents' relationship begins to strain due to financial issues. During this time, Young Ju's brother Joon Ho is born, and is given more freedom and choices due to his gender. Their father is an alcoholic, who is eventually arrested for DUI and subsequently loses his driver's license. As Young Ju matures and begins to enjoy friends and school, her parents' marriage continues to dwindle and begins affecting Joon, causing him to withdraw from school and further education. When her father starts beating his wife and herself, Young Ju eventually intervenes by calling the police and having her father arrested. When he is released from jail, he leaves the family, returning to their home country, Korea, without a word. Some time later, when her family is in a better financial position, they move into a better house when, Young Ju is preparing to leave for college, and knows her mother and brother are finally starting to settle into a better life.
