= Days of Blood and Starlight =

2012 novel written by Laini Taylor

- First US edition
- Author: Laini Taylor
- Cover artist: Alison Impey
- Language: English
- Series: Daughter of Smoke and Bone
- Genre: Fantasy, young adult fiction, romance
- Publisher: Little, Brown (US); Hodder & Stoughton (UK)
- Publication date: 6 November 2012
- Publication place: United States
- Media type: Print (Hardcover)
- Pages: 513
- ISBN: 978-0-316-13397-5
- Preceded by: Daughter of Smoke and Bone
- Followed by: Dreams of Gods and Monsters

Days of Blood and Starlight is a young adult fantasy novel written by Laini Taylor. It was published in November 2012 by Hachette Book Group, an imprint of Little, Brown and Company. The book is the second in a trilogy, preceded by Daughter of Smoke and Bone and followed by Dreams of Gods and Monsters.

The story continues where Daughter of Smoke and Bone left off. Karou has since realized that she is Madrigal, a chimaera (or creature made of both human and animal parts) who was killed for loving the seraph Akiva and resurrected by Brimstone in the form of a human girl to raise. Now that Brimstone was killed by the seraphim, the chimaera have taken Karou back to their residence so that she can perform the art of resurrection, as she is the only chimaera left who knows the art.

== Plot ==
Karou has left Earth for the land of the chimaera and seraphim, Eretz, where the chimaera have been defeated by the seraphim. She has begun the job taken up by her adopted father Brimstone: the art of resurrection, which will bring the dead members of the broken chimaera army back to life to defeat the seraphim. She blames Akiva for everything, while the angel himself thinks her dead and begins training with his half-siblings Hazael and Liraz to keep his feelings from overwhelming him. Karou's best friend Zuzana and her boyfriend Mik begin looking for her after a mysterious e-mail and reports that a phantom girl has been stealing teeth.

Thiago, the son of the Warlord and new commander of the chimaera army, has been courting Karou during her resurrection process and has offered up his own pain for the tithing process multiple times. He has specific resurrection instructions for her: make everyone larger, stronger, faster, and winged. Through this repeated process, the chimaera finally begin to win against the seraphim. Thiago has also brought a wolf chimaera named Ten to help Karou with the resurrection process and to serve as a sort of babysitter when Karou goes on her tooth missions. While she dislikes it, she is afraid to offend Thiago.

Meanwhile, two deer-like centaurs called Dama by the names of Sveva and Sarazal have escaped from slavery and are on the run. Sarazal has an infection from her manacles chafing her while she was enslaved. A boy named Rath of the Dashnag, chimaera with saber-toothed tiger heads, comes and helps them by carrying Sarazal to a Caprine village. The Caprine have a poultice to help Sarazal. When the seraphim, including Akiva, are looking for the Caprine, Sarazal wakes up to see Rath and screams. Akiva pretends that it was just a bird and leads the other seraphim away.

Zuzana and Mik decode the "puzzle" of Karou's e-mail and find where the chimaera are hiding. She is forced to tell them about her life as Madrigal and her job as a resurrectionist. This thrills Zuzana, who demands to help. Karou refuses to let her and says that they need to get out as soon as possible. While they are told to leave, they amuse the chimaera and enjoy it in their presence.

Thiago sends out an army including Ziri, Madrigal's "little Kirin shadow", to what he says is the Hintermost to help other chimaera, but in reality is an attack mission. The chimaera actually go to the Hintermost to help, and all die except for Ziri, who manages to glean the souls of the dead before attacking angels, who attack him in return. Karou says that she could try to heal him. After he is healed, Ziri tells Karou everything, including how Akiva summoned birds to let the Kirin escape.

Razgut, the fallen angel who held onto Izîl's back, found his way to Eretz and tells the seraphim that Karou is with the chimaera and practicing the art of resurrection. Among the seraphim, Akiva, Hazael, and Liraz plan on how to kill the emperor Joram and his brother Jael in the hope of ending the war and leading to a more peaceful world. Akiva seeks out Karou and gives her a thurible with Issa's soul in it. While Thiago is not pleased with Issa's return, he allows her to stay when Karou points out that the Naja will be able to help with resurrection work.

When Akiva is summoned to a council with Joram, he has his opportunity to kill the emperor. He uses the glamour to disguise his sword and, upon hearing the news that Joram killed his mother Festival, kills the emperor. Jael then steps in and kills Japheth, the crown prince, so that he can be the new emperor. Jael then commands that white robes and harps be given to everyone in an attempt to invade the human world and make the chimaera look evil for trying to fight the holy angels. Jael's army then attacks Akiva, Liraz, and Hazael, and they end up killing Hazael. Akiva says to take his body to Karou.

Ten comes in to talk to Karou and Karou aggravates the wolf, so she threatens the resurrectionist with killing off Zuzana and Mik. Karou teaches the two to become invisible, and they sneak away to a hotel in Morocco. Karou gets a memory of Brimstone sealing the souls of a thousand dead women and children in a cathedral after the fall of Loramendi, and they could be gleaned and given bodies again. While some stand with Karou, Thiago refuses. Later, Bast comes to Karou's door and says that three of those who stood with her, Amzallag and the Shadows That Live, were taken to the pit to be killed. When Karou goes to see it, Thiago is waiting for her and attempts to rape her. She uses a knife in her boot to slit his throat and gleans the souls of the three who were killed.

When Akiva and Liraz reach Karou, she says that because they don't have a thurible of Hazael's soul she can't resurrect him. Meanwhile, Thiago and Ten come and attack Akiva. Afterwards, they reveal that after killing Thiago and Ten, Ziri sliced his own throat for a greater cause, so his and Haxayas souls were placed in the bodies of the former two so that they could sneak out. Akiva, when he wakes up beside Liraz in a 'cell' thrown in there by Thiago, actually Ziri in Thiago's body, which was not even locked, says that he is going to burn the portals so that he can prevent Jael from invading the human world. However, as he begins it has already begun, and he is too late.

== Critical reception ==
Publishers Weekly gave Days of Blood and Starlight a starred review, calling the world of the novel "irresistible", Taylor's writing "dazzling", and saying that she has skill with suspense. Entertainment Weekly gave the novel an "A" and said that Days of Blood and Starlight was "richly imagined and compelling." Kirkus Reviews gave a mixed review of the novel, saying that its "memorable characters and turns of phrase" helped the novel, which was affected by its plot of "mostly ... licking wounds in the wake of the opener's savage inner and outer conflicts". Booklist said that the novel was "dark", "brutal", "bitter", and "violent".

Days of Blood and Starlight was, like its predecessor Daughter of Smoke and Bone, named one of Amazon.com's Best Books of the Month for November 2012. It was, in addition, placed #10 in Amazon.com's list of the Best Teen Books of 2012.
