= Daughter of Smoke and Bone =

2011 young adult novel by Laini Taylor

- First edition (US)
- Author: Laini Taylor
- Cover artist: Lea Bernstein Model: Place Models Hamburg: Amber
- Language: English
- Series: Daughter of Smoke and Bone
- Genre: Fantasy, romance, young adult fiction
- Publisher: Little, Brown (US); Hodder & Stoughton (UK)
- Publication date: 27 September 2011
- Publication place: United States
- Media type: Print (Hardcover)
- Pages: 418
- ISBN: 978-0-316-13402-6
- Followed by: Days of Blood and Starlight

Daughter of Smoke and Bone is a fantasy novel written by Laini Taylor. It was published in September 2011 by Hachette Book Group, an imprint of Little, Brown and Company. The story follows Karou, a seventeen-year-old Prague art student. Karou was raised by chimaera, or creatures that have attributes of different animals and humans. The chimaera she lives with demand teeth in exchange for wishes and send Karou to fetch these teeth for them. In the beginning, Karou has yet to discover what the teeth are eventually used for and why there are rules such as "no baby teeth" and "no rotting". While on one of these missions, Karou finds a seraph named Akiva who finds something familiar in her. Daughter of Smoke and Bone received high reviews from critics such as Chelsey Philpot from The New York Times, and Universal Pictures has acquired the rights for a film adaptation.

Daughter of Smoke and Bone is the first in a trilogy. The second book, Days of Blood and Starlight, was released on 6 November 2012. The third and final book, Dreams of Gods and Monsters, was released on 8 April 2014.

== Plot summary ==
Karou, a 17-year-old art student living in Prague, goes about her daily life attending classes and hanging out with her best friend Zuzana, while simultaneously trying to evade her ex-boyfriend Kazimir. It is soon revealed, however, that Karou was raised by four chimaera living in a workshop on a trans-dimensional plane between the human world and Eretz, from where the chimaera originate. The workshop is owned by Brimstone, who is her father figure.

While with Zuzana, Karou is summoned by Brimstone to do a job, which requires her to collect teeth - both of human and animal origin - from her world and bring them to him. He uses the teeth for unspecified purposes and pays Karou in physical trinkets which she uses to perform wishes. Karou, having grown weary of her job, which usually includes dealings with illegal dealers and graverobbers, reluctantly departs. When she returns to the workshop via portal doors that connects to all parts of the world, she finds the door scorched with a black handmark.

Across the world, more of Brimstone's doors are marked with the black handmark. The perpetrators turn out to be an angel named Akiva and his, essentially brother and sister, Liraz and Hazael, who belong to a race of seraphim at war with the chimaera in their local Eretz. When Karou returns to the workshop for another mission, the chimaera tell her of their fears of her "taking her freedom" and abandoning them. Feeling uncomfortable with the thought of leaving her family, Karou ventures into Morocco to purchase human teeth from an old graverobber, Izil, who is burdened with a cursed angel, Razgut, on his shoulder. In her meeting with this man, the graverobber tells her Brimstone once asked to purchase baby teeth.

Razgut recognizes and makes contact with Akiva, who was watching Karou. Akiva promptly attacks Karou, and she barely escapes his sword by fleeing into the workshop through a portal door. Inside of the workshop, Karou is taken by curiosity and decides to slip beyond the door leading to Eretz and has her first look at this world. When Brimstone discovers her, however, he is taken by anger and returns her to Prague, sealing off the entrance back in. While Karou is sealed off from Brimstone's workshop, all the portals in the human world leading to it are burned away by the seraph's black handprints. Consumed by a desire to see her family again, Karou travels the world, taking the physical wishes from Brimstone's teeth dealers by force. She eventually uses one of her wishes to obtain the ability to fly. In Marrakech, she connects with Razgut, and makes a deal with him to take her to Eretz. She returns one last time to Prague for the sake of seeing Zuzana's puppet show. In Prague, however, Karou is once more pursued by Akiva. She confronts and defeats him in a mid-air battle, and takes him to her apartment, where she questions him about Eretz and the chimaera-seraphim war. She strikes up a careful friendship with the angel. Eventually, Akiva discovers Karou's wishbone-necklace - the only thing she still has left from her chimaera family - and cries out, proclaiming he knows who she really is.

Upon realizing Karou's identity, Akiva defies his brother and sister, who want Karou dead. In a confrontation that takes place in public, exposing angels to the human world, Akiva sends Karou off to safety from his siblings. In Akiva's flashbacks, the truth is unveiled - Brimstone's business was to build new bodies using the teeth he collects, by which means he was able to endlessly resurrect fallen chimaera soldiers in the war against the seraphim, and "Karou" is simply the human incarnation of a deceased chimaera - born into a human body using the baby teeth once mentioned by Izil. Karou's original identity was that of Madrigal Kirin, a chimaera who once spared the life of Akiva when she found him on the battlefield, and subsequently fell in love and started an affair with the seraph. Because of this, she was eventually publicly executed. Once Akiva realizes this, he also helps Karou see the truth by shattering her wishbone necklace, restoring the memories of Karou's previous life. At last, however, Akiva must also reveal to her that his previous efforts to end the seraphim-chimaera war was by destroying Brimstone's business, and that all Karou's chimaera family is dead.

== Critical reception ==
The New York Times reviewed Daughter of Smoke and Bone. The reviewer was disappointed that it was the first in a series, saying that she "felt stood up", but was positive of the book in itself. She called it a "breath-catching romantic fantasy" and said that the "descriptions and language stop your heart and then ... start it up again." She ended by saying that even though she had wanted it to be its own book, she would "be back for more".

Kirkus Reviews also reviewed Smoke and Bone and were also rather positive. They said that though the novel "hinges on major contrivances", the language was "heightened ... even casual banter came off as wildly funny". The review ended with saying that the series began "deliciously".

Daughter of Smoke and Bone was a finalist for the 2011 Andre Norton Award.

== Film adaptation ==
Universal Pictures acquired the rights for a film adaptation. The producer for the movie was announced on 18 December 2012 to be Joe Roth. Stuart Beattie was attached as writer, followed by Michael Gracey as director. However as of 2026, no film has been made.
