= Daughter of Smoke and Bone (trilogy) =

Young-adult fantasy book series

- Daughter of Smoke and Bone; Days of Blood and Starlight; Dreams of Gods and Monsters
- Author: Laini Taylor
- Cover artist: Alison Impey
- Country: United States
- Language: English
- Genre: Young adult, fantasy, romance
- Publisher: Hachette Book Group
- Published: 27 September 2011 – 21 April 2014
- Media type: Print
- No. of books: 3

Daughter of Smoke and Bone is a young-adult fantasy book series written by Laini Taylor and published by Hachette Book Group, an imprint of Little, Brown and Company. It is a complete trilogy, Daughter of Smoke and Bone being published on 27 September 2011 in the United States; Days of Blood and Starlight on 6 November 2012 in the United States; and the third book Dreams of Gods and Monsters on April 1, 2014. The books have been published in a variety of different languages.

Additionally, the novella "Night of Cake and Puppets" was published in 2013, focusing on the protagonist's best friend and taking place in the timeline of "Daughter of Smoke and Bone."

The trilogy follows Karou, a 17-year-old art student living in Prague and concerns an ancient war between Seraphim and Chimaera in a parallel universe. The series has received an array of nominations and awards, and a planned movie adaptation of Daughter of Smoke and Bone is under development.

== Plot ==
=== Daughter of Smoke and Bone ===
A 17-year-old Prague art student named Karou leads an interesting life: she has blue hair that grows from her head, speaks a variety of languages, has three bullet scars in her stomach, and has been raised by creatures with human and animal features called chimaera. These are Brimstone, with lion legs and ram horns; Issa, with a snake's lower body, hood, and fangs; Twiga, with a giraffe neck; and Yasri, with a parrot beak. Kishmish, a crow with bat wings, acts as a messenger from Brimstone to Karou. Karou is often sent on missions to gather teeth for Brimstone, although she does not know what they are used for and why there are certain rules such as "no baby teeth" and "no rotting". In return she gets wishes; the higher the price, the greater the wish.

When Karou and her best friend Zuzana are at a restaurant, Kishmish flies in bearing a letter from Brimstone saying to come immediately. Karou is sent off to Paris via a magical door to get a seven-foot-long matching pair of elephant tusks. When she finds another portal back to Brimstone's shop, she notices a scorched black handprint on the door, but fortunately she is able to get back home. Similar handprints are appearing across the world. When Karou returns to Brimstone's shop, a violent thud strikes the second door to the shop that Karou is forbidden from investigating.

When Karou is on a mission in Marrakesh, a man with fiery eyes and wings notices her and chases after her to kill her, but as Karou turns around, the man notices something familiar about her and stops himself just in time for her to escape. The man's name is Akiva, an angel.

=== Days of Blood and Starlight ===
Karou has taken up the job of her adopted father Brimstone: the art of resurrection, which will bring the dead members of the broken chimaera army back to life to defeat the seraphim. Karou's best friend Zuzana and her boyfriend Mik begin looking for her after a mysterious e-mail and reports that a phantom girl has been stealing teeth. The son of the Warlord and new commander of the chimaera army, Thiago, has been courting Karou during her resurrection process and has offered up his own pain for the tithing process multiple times. He has specific resurrection instructions for her: make everyone larger, stronger, faster, and winged. Through this repeated process, the chimaera finally begin to win against the seraphim.

Meanwhile, the Seraphim army is hunting all remaining Chimaera and enslaving or killing them. Many of them are attempting to flee to a southern mountain range where they might find safety. Akiva spends his days with the army hunting them and his nights flying ahead to warn them. Slowly, Hazael and then Liraz come around to his point of view.

Zuzana and Mik find Karou and the Chimaera where they are hiding in the mountains of Morocco. They assist her in her task and befriend the Chimaera army. When Thiago sends out teams of soldiers to conduct a brutal campaign of terror on Seraph civilians, one group disobeys him and flies south to help the fleeing Chimaera. They are caught and killed by Jael, the emperor's brother, and his legion of soldiers, the Dominion. Ziri, the last other remaining Kirin, gleans their souls, but is caught. Akiva calls down birds to save him, and he escapes. When he returns, he tells Karou everything.

Akiva comes to Karou, bringing a thurible with her name on it that he thought meant she was dead. Instead, it contains the soul of Issa, part of her adoptive family. Resurrected, Issa also assists Karou.

Razgut, the fallen angel, is found by Jael's soldiers, and tells him about Karou and about the weapons humanity possesses. Akiva plans how to kill Joram, his father, to end the war with the Chimaera. When he is summoned to a council with Joram, he uses the opportunity to kill him. However, Jael has orchestrated the whole event, and used it to gain power. In the resulting battle, Hazael is killed. Akiva and Liraz escape and bring his body to Karou, but because they did not glean his soul, he cannot be resurrected.

After she kills Thiago while he is attempting to rape her, Karou puts Ziri's soul into his body so that she will not be forced to resurrect Thiago. Zuzana and Mik are sent away for their safety, but return with news: Jael and his Dominion, wearing the white robes of angels in human mythology, have invaded Earth. Akiva returns with a proposition: unite the Chimaera and the Misbegotten to fight Jael.

=== Dreams of Gods and Monsters ===
Eliza Jones is a 24-year-old is a researcher in Washington, D.C., where she is working on her Ph.D. As a girl, she escaped a cult that worshipped her as a prophet and descendant of the angel Elazael. She has visions in her dreams of monsters coming from the sky. When the recently abandoned camp of the Chimaera in Morocco is found and the pit is excavated, her boss is called in to analyse it, and she travels with him. Seeing the corpses of the Chimaera triggers more visions.

Jael has arrived with his soldiers, the Dominion, in Vatican City. Aided by Razgut, he portrays his forces as the angels from human mythology and asks humanity for help defeating devils; once he is armed with modern human technology, he intends to wipe out the Stelians.

Akiva is discovered by Stelian emissaries who, following his accidental disruption of the fabric of the universe while casting a spell, intend to kill him. They realise he is the child of Festival, and follow him invisibly. Ziri, as Thiago, rescues Liraz from Haxaya, whom Liraz had killed an earlier incarnation of. Akiva figures out how to make the seraph soldiers invulnerable to the effects of Chimaera hamsas. The allied army travels to the portal to stop the Dominion, but are ambushed on the way, and Ziri and Liraz are presumed dead.

On Earth, Karou, Akiva, Zuzana, Mik, and a Chimaera soldier discover Eliza, speaking prophesies in Seraphim, on their way to the Vatican. They are assisted by Esther, until she sells them out to Jael in exchange for the mining rights to Eretz. Esther throws Zuzana and Mik out of her hotel room, but they steal her stash of wishes given to her by Brimstone.

Karou and Akiva attempt to infiltrate Jael's lodgings, but are expected. However, using the same spell Akiva used to synchronise the burning of Brimstone's portals, they are able to set an incendiary charge on Jael and force him to return to Eretz unarmed. Zuzana and Mik wish for Eliza to be returned to her best possible self, and she regains her memories as Elazael and transforms into a Seraphim.

In Eretz, the Misbegotten and Chimera alliance has managed to convert the rest of the armed forces to their cause, and upon returning Jael is imprisoned. Ziri has died, but Liraz has gleaned his soul, and he is resurrected. Eliza, Mik, and Zuzana return to Eretz through another portal known to Elazael.

The Stelians arrive to confront Akiva, whose magic has been damaging the fabric of the universe, endangering Eretz. Eliza tells the history of Eretz and reveals that the creation myth the Seraphim have involving "Godstars" is in fact a prophecy, and they are destined to battle the beasts that threaten Eretz together.

== Inspirations and origin ==
The inspiration for the setting of Daughter and Smoke and Bone, Prague, came from a graphic novel that Taylor wrote with her husband. They were looking for settings when her best friend suggested Prague, so the two went to the city to get an idea of the setting. When Taylor was thinking of writing Daughter of Smoke and Bone, she decided to work with Prague again because of its "moody Gothic atmosphere", "stunning beauty", "mazy ways", the history and art of the setting, the marionettes, and because it gave her an excuse to go back to Prague. In addition, she chose the secondary setting of Marrakesh because she became "fascinated" with the city after reading Tahir Shah's books and My Marrakesh.

== Publication history ==
Daughter of Smoke and Bone was first published in the United States on 27 September 2011 and was released in paperback on 11 October 2011. The novel was released in the United Kingdom in hardcover on 29 September 2011 and was published in paperback on 5 November 2011. It was released in Spanish on 9 October 2011, German on 23 October 2011, Italian on 4 November 2011, French on 18 October 2011, Russian on 28 November 2011, Slovak on 8 November 2011, and Czech on 2 May 2012.

== Critical reception ==
Daughter of Smoke and Bone has garnered a positive reception from critics, with The New York Times saying that though they were disappointed in the fact that it was the first in a series, the descriptions and language made up for it, and they would read the next in the series. Kirkus Reviews said that the novel "hinged on major contrivances", but was as well impressed by the language. Publishers Weekly gave the novel a starred review, saying that it is "exquisitely written and beautifully paced". Booklist said that Taylor's crafting of words, time frames, and characters added a sense of plausibility to the fantasy. Entertainment Weekly gave the book an "A−", saying that it was "smartly plotted, surprising, and fiercely compelling". The Los Angeles Times had similar things to say about Taylor's pacing and style.

Days of Blood and Starlight still had positive reviews, but they were a little more mixed. Publishers Weekly gave the novel a starred review, praising the world that it was set in, Taylor's writing, and the suspense. Kirkus Reviews said that while the characters were a high point of the novel, they were left unimpressed by the plot. Booklist called the novel's plot "dark and brutal", as well as "bitter" and "violent". Entertainment Weekly was more positive, giving Days of Blood and Starlight an "A" and saying that the novel is "richly imagined and compelling".

Publishers Weekly gave Dreams of Gods and Monsters a starred review. Kirkus Reviews praised Taylor's "poetically intense language," and called it "an ambitious, gorgeously edgy drama."

== Awards and nominations ==
Daughter of Smoke and Bone was named one of Amazon.com's Best Books of the Month for September 2011. At the end of the year, it ranked #1 for Amazon.com's list of the Best Teen Books of 2011. The novel was on the YALSA Top Ten Best Fiction for Young Adults 2012 list as well as landing on the Reader's Choice Booklist for Sci-Fi/Fantasy. It also won the 2012 Audie Award for Best Fantasy Audiobook. Daughter of Smoke and Bone was placed on "Best Books of 2011" lists for Publishers Weekly, School Library Journal, Kirkus Reviews (Best Teen Books), and the Los Angeles Public Library, as well as a Best of the Best award from the Chicago Public Library for 2012. The book was a finalist for both the Andre Norton Award and the Children's Choice Book Awards Teen Book of the Year. It was also a winner of the Oregon Spirit Book Award, something that Taylor previously won for Lips Touch: Three Times in 2009. Daughter of Smoke and Bone was also a New York Times Notable Children's Book of 2011, the Barnes & Noble Review Best YA Fiction of 2011, a selection for the ABC Best Children's Book Catalog for 2011, and on the LOCUS Recommended Reading List for 2011.

Days of Blood and Starlight was named one of Amazon.com's Best Books of the Month for November 2012. At the end of the year, it ranked #10 for Amazon.com's list of the Best Teen Books of 2012.

== Adaptations ==
Universal Pictures has acquired the rights for a film adaption of Daughter of Smoke and Bone. The producer for the movie was announced on 18 December 2012 to be Joe Roth, and the screenwriter is Stuart Beattie. As of 2022, no release date or further details concerning the film adaptation have been revealed.
