= Golden Duck Award =

Annual award for children's SF books

The Golden Duck Awards for Excellence in Children's Science Fiction were given annually from 1992 to 2017. The awards were presented every year at either Worldcon or the North American Science Fiction Convention (NASFiC). In 2018 they were replaced by Notable Book Lists of the same names sponsored by the Library and Information Technology Association (LITA).

The Golden Duck Awards were funded by Super-Con-Duck-Tivity, Inc., the sponsor of the U.S. midwest regional science fiction convention DucKon. Winners were selected by a group of teachers, librarians, parents, high tech workers and reviewers.

== Categories ==
The categories are:

- Picture Book
- Middle Grades (the Eleanor Cameron Award)
- Young Adult (the Hal Clement Award)

There was also a provision for a Special Award if a book was found to be outstanding but did not fit any of the standard categories.

== Winners ==
=== Picture Book Award ===
The Picture Book Award is sometimes given to a book with non-fictional science content with a story "wrapper" as well as traditional science fiction themes.

- 1992 – Time Train by Paul Fleischman, illustrated by Claire Ewart
- 1993 – June 29, 1999 by David Wiesner
- 1994 – Richie's Rocket by Joan Anderson, photographed by George Ancona
- 1995 – Time Flies by Eric Rohmann
- 1996 – Insects from Outer Space by Vladimir Vagin and Frank Asch
- 1997 – Grandpa Takes Me to the Moon by Timothy Gaffney, illustrated by Barry Root
- 1998 – Floating Home by David Getz, illustrated by Michael Rex
- 1999 – Noah and the Space Ark by Laura Cecil, illustrated by Emma Chichester Clark
- 2000 – Hush, Little Alien by Daniel Kirk
- 2001 – Rex by Robert Gould and Kathleen Duey, illustrated by Eugene Epstein
- 2002 – Baloney (Henry P.) by Jon Scieszka, illustrated by Lane Smith
- 2003 – Incredible Cross-Sections of Star Wars, Episode II: Attack of the Clones by Curtis Saxton and Richard Chasemore
- 2004 – Hazel Nutt, Mad Scientist by David Elliot, illustrated by True Kelley (Holliday House, ISBN 0-8234-1711-5)
- 2005 – Science Verse by Jon Scieszka, illustrated by Lane Smith (Viking)
- 2006 – Captain Raptor and the Moon Mystery by Kevin O'Malley, illustrated by Patrick O'Brien
- 2007 – Night of the Homework Zombies by Scott Nickel, illustrated by Steve Harpster (ISBN 9781598890358)
- 2008 – Mars Needs Moms by Berkeley Breathed
- 2009 – We're Off to Look for Aliens by Colin McNaughton
- 2010 – Swamps of Sleethe by Jack Prelutsky
- 2011 – Oh No! (Or, How My Science Project Destroyed the World) by Mac Barnett, illustrated by Dan Santat
- 2012 – Earth to Clunk by Pam Smallcomb, illustrated by Joe Berger
- 2013 – Oh No! Not Again!: (Or How I Built a Time Machine to Save History) (Or At Least My History Grade) by Mac Barnett, illustrated by Dan Santat
- 2014 – Vader's Little Princess by Jeffrey Brown
- 2015 – Max Goes to the Space Station by Jeffrey Bennett, illustrated by Michael Carroll
- 2016 – Interstellar Cinderella, by Deborah Underwood, illustrated by Meg Hunt
- 2017 – Blip! written and illustrated by Barnaby Richards

=== Eleanor Cameron Award ===
This award is given to chapter books and middle grade novels. The protagonists are science users and problem solvers. Occasionally, books with fantasy elements but a science fiction theme have won.

- 1992 – My Teacher Glows in the Dark by Bruce Coville
- 1993 – Weirdos of the Universe Unite! by Pamela Service
- 1994 – Worf's First Adventure by Peter David
- 1995 – Shape Changer by Bill Brittain
- 1996 – Star Hatchling by Margaret Bechard
- 1997 – Kipton and the Tower of Time by Charles L. Fontenay
- 1998 – The Andalite Chronicles by Katherine Applegate
- 1999 – Young Jedi Knights series by Kevin J. Anderson and Rebecca Moesta
- 2000 – I Was a Sixth Grade Alien by Bruce Coville
- 2001 – The Power of Un by Nancy Etchemendy
- 2002 – Beatnik Rutabagas from Beyond the Stars by Quentin Dodd
- 2003 – Andrew Lost series: Andrew Lost on the Dog; Andrew Lost in the Bathroom; Andrew Lost in the Kitchen by J. C. Greenburg
- 2004 – Escape from Memory by Margaret Peterson Haddix
- 2005 – The Supernaturalist by Eoin Colfer (Hyperion)
- 2006 – (tie)

Whales on Stilts by M. T. Anderson, illustrated by Kurt Cyrus (Harcourt, 2005. ISBN 0-15-205340-9)
The Fran That Time Forgot by Jim Benton (Aladdin, ISBN 0-689-86298-9)

- 2007 – Apers by Mark Jansen with Barbara Day Zinicola (Dailey Swan Publishing, 2006; ISBN 978-0-9773676-2-7)
- 2008 – (tie)

Shanghaied to the Moon by Michael J. Daley
Gravity Buster: Journal #2 of a Cardboard Genius by Frank Asch

- 2009 – Lighter than Air by Henry Melton
- 2010 – Z Rex by Steve Cole
- 2011 – Alien Encounter by Pamela Service and Mike Gorman
- 2012 – Worst-Case Scenario Ultimate Adventure #2: Mars! by Hena Kahn and David Borgenicht
- 2013 – Alien on a Rampage from the Intergalactic Bed and Breakfast series by Clete Barrett Smith
- 2014 – Two books from the Galaxy Zack series: Hello, Nebulon! and Journey to Juno by Ray O'Ryan and Colin Jack
- 2015 – Ambassador by William Alexander
- 2016 – Fuzzy Mud, by Louis Sacher

=== Hal Clement Award ===
Hal Clement's own writings were not YA, but his high school science teaching career strongly connects him to the YA age group. The primary story elements are correct science with science fictional extrapolations and characters who solve problems on their own.

- 1992 – Invitation to the Game by Monica Hughes
- 1993 – River Rats by Caroline Stevermer
- 1994 – The Giver by Lois Lowry
- 1995 – The Ear, the Eye and the Arm by Nancy Farmer
- 1996 – (tie)

The Winds of Mars by H. M. Hoover
The Night Room by E. M. Goldman

- 1997 – Wildside by Steven Gould
- 1998 – Shade's Children by Garth Nix
- 1999 – Alien Dreams by Larry Segriff
- 2000 – The Game of Worlds by Roger McBride Allen from David Brin's Out of Time series
- 2001 – Jumping Off the Planet by David Gerrold
- 2002 – This Side of Paradise by Steven Layne
- 2003 – Feed by M. T. Anderson
- 2004 – Gunpowder Empire by Harry Turtledove (Tor Books)
- 2005 – Balance of Trade by Sharon Lee and Steve Miller (Meisha Merlin, 2004)
- 2006 – Uglies by Scott Westerfeld (Simon Pulse)
- 2007 – Rash by Pete Hautman (Simon & Schuster, 2006; ISBN 978-0-689-86801-6)
- 2008 – Sky Horizon by David Brin and illustrated by Scott Hampton (Subterranean Press, 2007, ISBN 978-1-59606-109-5)
- 2009 – (tie)

The Hunger Games by Suzanne Collins (Scholastic Press, 2008, ISBN 978-0-439-02348-1)
Little Brother by Cory Doctorow (Doherty, Tom Associates, LLC, 2008, ISBN 978-0-7653-1985-2)

- 2010 – Catching Fire by Suzanne Collins
- 2011 – WWW: Watch by Robert J. Sawyer
- 2012 – (tie)

A Beautiful Friendship by David Weber
A Long, Long Sleep by Anna Sheehan

- 2013 – Cinder by Marissa Meyer
- 2014 – The Planet Thieves by Dan Krokos
- 2015 – Expiration Day by William Campbell Powell
- 2016 – Armada, by Ernest Cline

=== Special awards ===
- 1997 Strong Female Characters – Kipton and the Android by Charles L. Fontenay (Royal Fireworks Press, 1996)
- 1999 Australian Contribution to Children's Science Fiction – Garth Nix
- 2000 Promotion of Reading – Harry Potter series by J. K. Rowling
- 2003 Best Science and Technology Education – Tales from the Wonder Zone (entire series) by Julie E. Czerneda (Trifolium Books)
- 2007 Nonfiction – Write Your Own Science Fiction Story by Tish Farrell (Compass Point Books, 2006; ISBN 978-0-7565-1643-7)
- 2008 Nonfiction – World of Science Fiction – 12 titles by John Hamilton (ABDO Publishing Company)

+ Stone Arch Books for publishing quality science fiction graphic novels

- 2010 Nonfiction – You Write It: Science Fiction by John Hamilton (ABDO Publishing Company)
