= Holiday Mice! =

Children's book series by Bethany Roberts

- Halloween Mice!; Valentine Mice!; Christmas Mice!; Thanksgiving Mice!; Birthday Mice!; Easter Mice!; Fourth of July Mice!
- Author: Bethany Roberts
- Illustrator: Doug Cushman
- Country: United States
- Language: English
- Genre: Children's fiction
- Publisher: Clarion Books; (Houghton Mifflin Harcourt)
- Published: 1995–2004

Holiday Mice! is the informal title of a children's book series written by Bethany Roberts and illustrated by Doug Cushman. It was published between 1995 and 2004 by Houghton Mifflin's Clarion imprint; reception was mixed to positive.

== Books ==
The series, which consists of seven titles, was referred to as Holiday Mice (without the exclamation mark) by Publishers Weekly in 2004. In each book, a family of mice—two children plus their mother and father—celebrate the titular holidays. Author Bethany Roberts had previously written the Waiting-for Series, a trilogy in two of whose installments a rabbit family celebrated spring and Christmas.

#	Title	Date	Ref.	ISBN
1	Halloween Mice!	August 1995		0-395-67064-0
The mouse family wards off a cat during their midnight party at a pumpkin patch.
2	Valentine Mice!	January 2, 1997		0-395-77518-3
The family sends out Valentine's Day cards to forest residents as they travel through a snow-covered landscape.
3	Christmas Mice!	September 2000		0-395-91204-0
During their Christmas festivities, they receive a holiday cheese from a nearby cat, and return the favor by sending it a cookie.
4	Thanksgiving Mice!	September 2001		0-618-12040-8
The family puts on a play about the origins of the holiday.
5	Birthday Mice!	October 21, 2002		0-618-31367-2
When their son turns two, the parents hold a birthday for him in a forest clearing, set to a cowboy theme.
6	Easter Mice!	2003		0-618-16455-3
While on an Easter egg hunt, the son in the family feels left out without finding an egg.
7	Fourth of July Mice!	May 2004		0-618-31367-2
The family spends Independence Day holding a parade, playing baseball, swimming in the pool, and enjoying fireworks among other activities.

== Reception ==
Reception of the Holiday Mice! books was mixed-to-positive. Cushman's artwork was praised, but occasional criticism was leveraged towards Roberts' "choppy" rhyming text.

Reviewing the debut installment, Halloween Mice!, Virginia Opocensky of the School Library Journal (SLJ) remarked that the "Full-page watercolors are appropriate for the holiday while not too scary for the intended audience." When Christmas Mice! was published a few years later, another SLJ reviewer wrote, "The rhyming text works hard to stick to a basic vocabulary, but the story falls flat." The publication noted similar problems with the later Thanksgiving and Birthday installments, but gave their approval to Fourth of July; Carol Marshall nitpicked Thanksgiving's historical accuracy.

Publishers Weekly gave Halloween a mixed review: "Roberts's text lacks the rhythm or drama of a good read-aloud. Cushman's watercolor mice set a cheery holiday mood but don't add much zing." Two years later, the magazine called Valentine's Mice! "[a] spirited if slight holiday caper."
