= A Mouse Told His Mother =

1997 children's book by Bethany Roberts

- Author: Bethany Roberts
- Illustrator: Maryjane Begin
- Language: English
- Genre: Children's fiction
- Published: April 1997
- Publisher: Little, Brown and Company
- Publication place: United States
- Pages: 32 (unpaged)
- ISBN: 0-316-74982-6

A Mouse Told His Mother is a 1997 picture book by Bethany Roberts, with illustrations by Maryjane Begin. The book, about a mouse boy whose mother tries coaxing him to bed while he plans to take adventures, received critical acclaim.

== Plot ==
A boy mouse boasts of going on an adventure during the nighttime hours, but on every attempt, his mother recommends doing or taking something more important on the way to bed; the scenarios that unfold across the eleven double spreads all begin with the title phrase. At the end of the story, the mouse—still going on adventures in his imagination—flies down on a parachute across starry skies, much to the puzzlement of the mother who nonetheless wishes to him, "Sweet dreams. And good night."

== Background ==
The book came out almost a year before Valentine Mice!, another Bethany Roberts work with mouse characters which served as the follow-up to 1995's Halloween Mice!. Roberts' illustrator partner, Maryjane Begin, hailed from Providence, Rhode Island.

== Thematic analysis ==
Peter F. Neumeyer of The Boston Globe saw A Mouse Told His Mother as an alternative to Helen Cooper's The Boy Who Wouldn't Go to Bed, which was published the same year and used the same basic plot: "Mother wants [her child] to go to bed, child doesn't want to. True to formula, child departs on his own fantasy trip."

== Release and reception ==
Announced in July 1996, A Mouse Told His Mother was published by Little, Brown in April 1997 to critical acclaim. Publishers Weekly called it "a captivating picture book...[in which] Roberts's neatly condensed prose plays straight man to Begin's minutely detailed and lushly panoramic artwork, which catapults readers into the mouse child's imaginative alter-world." The Worcester Telegram & Gazette, along with Stephanie Loer of The Boston Globe, gave word on the engaging large-scale artwork. "Here is a first-rate bedtime book," Loer's review concluded. "The story is clever, full of fantasy, fun, and adventure, but eventually it gets the job done—it lulls a child to sleep."

Kirkus Reviews and the Language Arts journal observed the conversational dynamic between the mother and son in its pages, which reminded the former and PW of Margaret Wise Brown's The Runaway Bunny. Publishers Weekly, along with Christy Norris in the School Library Journal, respectively took note of the title words' "skillful" and "lulling" repetition.

Ilene Cooper of Booklist concurred with PW's reviewers, as did SLJ's Norris: "Delightful...thoughtful and well-illustrated... Begin's illustrations successfully blend little mouse's fantasies with reality. When he imagines he's flying an airplane, his patchwork quilt becomes the landscape below."
