= Waiting-for Series =

Children's book series by Bethany Roberts

- Waiting-for-Spring Stories; Waiting-for-Papa Stories; Waiting-for-Christmas Stories
- Author: Bethany Roberts
- Illustrator: William Joyce (Spring); Sarah Stapler (Papa/Christmas)
- Country: United States
- Language: English
- Genre: Children's fiction
- Publisher: Harper & Row (Spring/Papa); Clarion Books (Christmas)
- Published: 1984–1994

Waiting-for is the informal name for a trilogy of children's books by Connecticut author Bethany Roberts—Waiting-for-Spring Stories, Waiting-for-Papa Stories, and Waiting-for-Christmas Stories—published between 1984 and 1994. In each book, rabbit parents tell a series of miniature stories about the titular topics. The first and third installments were Roberts' earliest manuscripts; Waiting-for-Spring Stories was originally intended as a one-shot title, and was also one of the earliest stints for Louisiana-based illustrator William Joyce. Sarah Stapler of Maine took over Joyce's role for the other two titles.

Waiting-for-Spring and Waiting-for-Papa were respectively published by Harper & Row in 1984 and 1990, while Houghton Mifflin's Clarion Books imprint handled the release of 1994's Waiting-for-Christmas. The series was well-acclaimed during its original print run, with the illustrations receiving comparisons to the works of Beatrix Potter and similar artists.

== Books ==
=== Waiting-for-Spring Stories ===
The first title in the Waiting-for series, Waiting-for-Spring Stories, was published by Harper & Row in September 1984. It contains seven miniature stories of 2–3 pages' length told by a father rabbit to his children during the winter season.

=== Waiting-for-Papa Stories ===
Waiting-for-Papa Stories
- Author: Bethany Roberts
- Illustrator: Sarah Stapler
- Language: English
- Series: Waiting-for Series
- Genre: Children's fiction
- Published: March 1990
- Publisher: Harper & Row
- Publication place: United States
- Pages: 31 (Note: Listed as 32 in Forthcoming Books 1990.)
- ISBN: 0-06-025050-X

The second installment in the series, Waiting-for-Papa Stories, was published in March 1990 by Harper & Row.

Papa Rabbit, the father narrator from Waiting-for-Spring Stories, is running late on his way home. While his family waits for him, his wife Mama Rabbit decides to tell her children a new set of seven miniature stories—all featuring him—to assuage their worries.

=== Waiting-for-Christmas Stories ===
The final title, Waiting-for-Christmas Stories, was published in 1994 by Houghton Mifflin's Clarion Books imprint; Papa Rabbit returns with a new round of tales set during the holidays.

== Background ==
Originally intended as a one-shot title, Waiting-for-Spring Stories was the first book by Bethany Roberts to see publication. A companion manuscript written around the time of Spring's release became the trilogy's last installment, Waiting-for-Christmas Stories, in 1994. Louisiana-based William Joyce illustrated Spring in one of his earliest stints; Sarah Stapler, an artist from Bowdoinham, Maine, replaced him for Papa and Christmas.

== Reception ==
The Waiting-for series was well-acclaimed during its original publication. Spring received a starred review in the School Library Journal (SLJ); The New York Times Book Review listed Papa as a title of interest; and the Bulletin of the Center for Children's Books gave Christmas an "R" ("Recommended") grade. Joyce's and Stapler's work were compared to Beatrix Potter's oeuvre; reviewers also found Stapler's work on Papa reminiscent of Arnold Lobel and Thornton W. Burgess.

Reviewing Papa for SLJ, Louise L. Sherman declared that "Children are sure to be captivated by the charm and gentle humor of the stories", and also took note of the change in illustrators between instalments: "Stapler's illustrations suit the stories well. Her rabbits inhabit a brighter and more elaborate home than William Joyce's rustic settings of the earlier book." The Bronx publication Wilson Library Bulletin said, "The simplicity [of Mama Rabbit's tales] adds to their aura of freshness and self-completeness."

== Legacy ==
Under the Clarion imprint, Roberts would later write more books about animals celebrating holidays and observances via what became the Holiday Mice series, with Doug Cushman as the illustrator. The first title, Halloween Mice!, was announced in December 1994 and published in August 1995.
