= Waiting-for-Christmas Stories =

1994 children's book by Bethany Roberts

- Author: Bethany Roberts
- Illustrator: Sarah Stapler
- Language: English
- Series: Waiting-for Series
- Genre: Children's fiction; Christmas literature
- Published: 1994
- Publisher: Clarion Books
- Publication place: United States
- Pages: 32
- ISBN: 0-395-67324-0

Waiting-for-Christmas Stories is a 1994 American children's book written by Bethany Roberts and illustrated by Sarah Stapler. The last in the informally named Waiting-for Series, it follows the same format as the first two titles (1984's Waiting-for-Spring Stories and 1990's Waiting-for-Papa Stories), this time with a holiday flavor. As with the two previous titles, reviews for this instalment were positive. Starting in 1995, publisher Houghton Mifflin (under its Clarion Books imprint) would bring out more holiday-themed books by Roberts under the Holiday Mice banner.

== Synopsis ==
Papa Rabbit, the father previously seen in Waiting-for-Spring Stories (1984) and Waiting-for-Papa Stories (1990), shares seven miniature stories about the holiday season with his family in the same vein as the previous books.

== Development ==
"I'm sure some of the Christmas ideas come directly from holidays that we celebrated in Wallingford. I write fantasy, so it's not like I'm taking stories out of my childhood, but there are bits and pieces. Even my love of rabbits. I had a pet rabbit when I lived in Wallingford. The first story I ever wrote as a child was about a rabbit."

— Bethany Roberts, 1994, Record-Journal

With Waiting-for-Christmas Stories, publication of the series nicknamed Waiting-for moved from Harper & Row to Houghton Mifflin's Clarion Books imprint. Maine-based artist Susan Stapler, who replaced William Joyce by the time of Waiting-for-Papa Stories, remained as series illustrator. Bethany Roberts, a children's author based in Hamden, Connecticut, originally drafted Waiting-for-Christmas during 1984; in later years, she would spend one week on a revision that formed the basis of the final version. At the time of the draft, she pondered on "what animals would be waiting for spring. After I had a character, I thought, 'What else would children be waiting for?' 'Waiting-for Christmas' was really easy to think of. It sounded like a logical choice."

== Reception ==
Deborah Abbott of Booklist wrote that Waiting-for-Christmas Stories was "nice for sharing one-on-one". Roger Sutton, Editor of The Bulletin of the Center for Children's Books, gave it an "R" (Recommended) grade. "The tone is droll and comfy, the stories silly but low-key, and while younger listeners might be confused by the storytelling frame (since the rabbits in the stories are the rabbits in the family)," he went on to say, "they'll still appreciate each brief vignette." Margaret Deaver of The Wichita Eagle remarked, "The short, simple sentences make this book a good one for beginning readers."

Abbott and Sutton both stated that the watercolor work went well with the holiday aesthetic. Both of them, along with Deaver, noted the animacy of various Christmas objects. Among those, Abbott said, were "a mailbox, a rolling pin, a gift box, and a treetop star" that "provide a refreshing tone to these gentle episodes."

== Legacy ==
Under the Clarion imprint, Roberts would later write more books about animals celebrating holidays and observances via what became the Holiday Mice series, with Doug Cushman as the illustrator. The first title, Halloween Mice!, was announced in December 1994 and published in August 1995.
