= Lee Wardlaw =

American author of children's books

- Born: November 20, 1955 (age 70); Salina, Kansas
- Writing career
- Genre: Children's Literature
- Website: www.leewardlaw.com/books.htm

Lee Wardlaw (born 20 November 1955) is the author of several children's books, such as 101 Ways to Bug Your Teacher, 101 Ways to Bug Your Parents, and See You In September. In 2015, Wardlaw published Won Ton and Chopstick with illustrator Eugene Yelchin, a sequel to their Won Ton: A Cat Tale Told in Haiku.

== Early life ==
Lee was born in Salina, Kansas on November 20, 1955. Raised in Santa Barbara, California, she attended Cold Spring Elementary School, Santa Barbara Junior High School, and Santa Barbara High School. During that period of time, her parents had a divorce and her house was burned down by a firestorm. She then graduated from California Polytechnic State University with honors and a bachelor's degree in Education. After graduation, she started her teaching career as an Elementary teacher for five years. She then decided to become an author because

"I'm a storyteller. For years, people have joked that if you ask my dad what

time it is, he'll tell you how to build a watch. I have to embellish! I have to tell you all the who's and what's and how's and why's. And I have to do it with arm gestures and silly voices and weird faces. I also became a writer because I love to read. The elementary school I went to didn't have a library.

So, in second grade, after I finished reading all the books we had at home, and all the books at school in my teacher's classroom, I was so desperate to read something else, that I wrote my own book. I had so much fun writing that first book, that I kept on writing after that."

She started writing when she was seven and tried to get her first book published at nineteen but was rejected multiple times until she was thirty.
