= Waiting for Spring =

Waiting for Spring may refer to:

- Waiting for Spring (album), a 1989 album by David Benoit
- Waiting for Spring (1947 film), a Chinese film
- Waiting for Spring (2005 film), a South Korean film
- Waiting for Spring (2013 film), a Canadian documentary film
- Waiting for Spring (manga), a 2014 Japanese manga series by Anashin
- Waiting-for-Spring Stories, a 1984 book by Bethany Roberts
