= M. T. Anderson =

American author (born 1968)

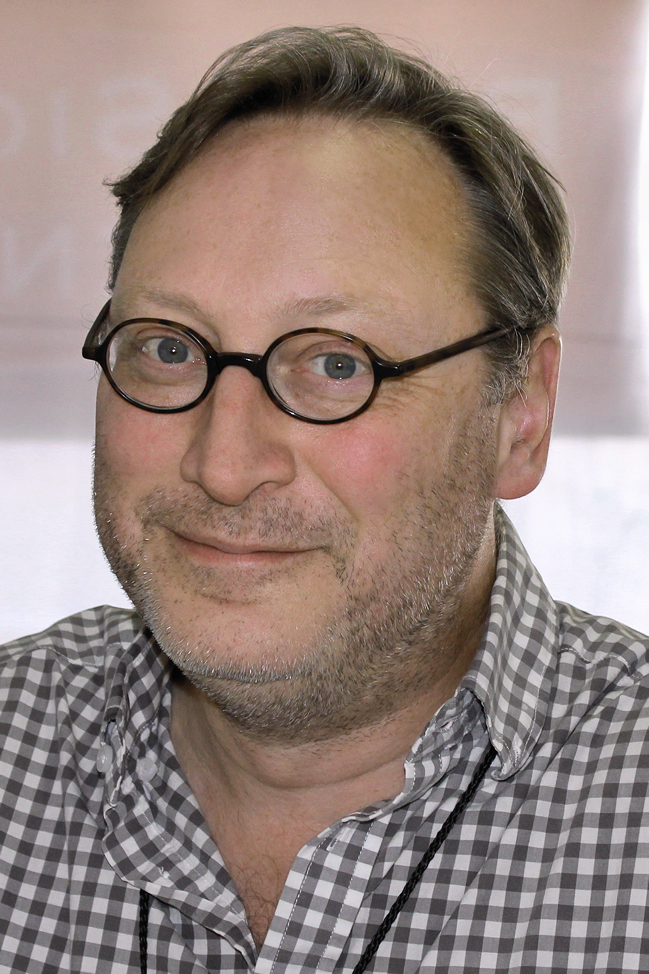
- Anderson in 2015
- Born: Matthew Tobin Anderson; November 4, 1968 (age 58); Cambridge, Massachusetts, U.S.
- Occupation: Author
- Website: mtanderson.com

Matthew Tobin Anderson (born November 4, 1968) is an American writer of children's books that range from picture books to young adult novels. He won the National Book Award for Young People's Literature in 2006 for The Pox Party, the first of two "Octavian Nothing" books, which are historical novels set in Revolution-era Boston. Anderson is known for using wit and sarcasm in his stories, as well as advocating that young adults are capable of mature comprehension.

== Biography ==
Anderson was born in Cambridge, Massachusetts, and grew up in Stow, Massachusetts. His father, Will Anderson, was an engineer, and his mother, Juliana Collins Anderson, was an Episcopal priest. He attended St. Mark's School, Harvard College, the University of Cambridge (BA in English literature), and Syracuse University (MFA in creative writing). Anderson worked at Candlewick Press before his first novel Thirsty (1997) was accepted for publication there. He has also worked as a disc jockey for WCUW radio; as an instructor at Vermont College of Fine Arts; and as a music critic for The Improper Bostonian. He currently lives in Vermont, and is on the Board of the National Children's Book and Literacy Alliance, a national non-profit organization that advocates for literacy, literature, and libraries.

=== Writing style ===
Anderson is known for challenging his readers, of varying ages, to look at the world in new ways. Anderson has also remarked, "We write because we can't decipher things the first time around." His novels directed at young adults, such as Thirsty (1997) and Feed (2002), tend to direct their satire at society. He has also written children's picture books such as Handel, Who Knew What He Liked, and novels directed toward pre-teen readers such as The Game of Sunken Places. Anderson tends to write with sophisticated wit and storylines, making the point that young people are more intelligent than some might think. In response to the question of why he gives so much credit to his young audience, Anderson stated in an interview with Julie Prince: "Our survival as a nation rests upon the willingness of the young to become excited and engaged by new ideas we never considered as adults."

While he was writing Feed, Anderson took in younger, pop-culture-oriented media, such as Seventeen, Maxim, and Teen Vogue. He used these media sources to convey an accurate teenage voice, but in a more depleted, abbreviated form. He's used this method many times, including reading 18th century novels during his writing of The Astonishing Life of Octavian Nothing. A shy person, Anderson has stated that he greatly prefers writing to public speaking. As a writer, he does not shy from taking on difficult questions and deeper, more mature concepts and themes. Unlike many other young-adult writers, Anderson views the characters he creates simply as figures moving and acting on his terms. The only exception to this view of his characters has been his main character in The Astonishing Life, Octavian Nothing.

Anderson faces unique challenges in writing for the young adult market, especially concerning the topics he chooses. He has heavily researched the time periods of his novels to portray his characters accurately. Similarly to Feed, Anderson had to put himself in the shoes of a young person from a different time period when he wrote The Astonishing Life. However, this novel challenged him to explore the dialect of a time period that had already happened, rather than a time period that has yet to come. Anderson pointed out that he actually tends to dislike his books after he's finished with them, a declaration that has been seen as modest; he feels distanced from the work and is usually eager to move on to another project. This is his reasoning behind writing in so many different genres. Anderson has also indicated that he hopes not only to continue writing for young adults and children, but also to write for an adult audience in the future.

== Feed ==
Feed is a young-adult novel focusing on the lives of teenagers in a future America. Within this dystopian society, young people are implanted with "the feed", a computer chip that connects them to a global network of advertisements, images, audio messages, and text-based communication. The government uses the feed to profile everyone to show what their interests and dislikes are. Anyone who tries to 'beat' the feed can be denied later when they try to get information or help from the sources. The novel's themes are corporate power and consumerism. Feed has also been regarded as a literary source for young adults to not only expand their knowledge of citizenship outside of the everyday youth status, but also increase their capacity for social change. The novel also focuses on the dependent nature of the characters; everyone is so dependent on the feed's transmissions that everything else in society decays. Feed received praise for Anderson's imaginative wit. The unique use of "futuristic" language is noted as one of the novel's strong points. Feed won the Los Angeles Times Book Award and has been a finalist for both the National Book Award and the Boston Globe–Horn Book Award. Feed was also named one of the ALA Best Books for Young Adults.

=== Feed in schools ===
Feed has been taught as a dystopian novel for young adults, exaggerating our modern society in an attempt to challenge it. The novel has been used as tool to show teenagers, who are generally familiar and even accepting of advertising, what the dangers of consumerism are without alarming them. Even the educational system in the novel has been compromised by corporations, which directly causes students to question the relation between consumerism and education. The novel not only addresses mindless consumerism, but powerful industry and marketing. Feed also tackles the importance of language, and the negative effect that occurs to the depletion of the English language. The general goal in teaching Feed is to show students what it means to be moral consumers.

== Thirsty ==
Thirsty is the story of Chris, a teenage boy who is growing up to become a vampire while the people of his town (Boston) dedicate their time to fighting such dreaded creatures. His transformation is told through the similarities of growing up and going through adolescence. The plot is said to be startling, suspenseful and creepy, but also contains a captivating plot filled with humor. Thirsty was Anderson's first published novel and his debut in young adult literature. The book was considered a particularly impressive first novel, quickly bringing Anderson notice as an author worth watching.

== The Astonishing Life of Octavian Nothing ==
Taking readers back to the birth of the United States, The Astonishing Life of Octavian Nothing, Traitor to the Nation features the son of an African princess, raised in unique circumstances, having been brought to the American colonies. Octavian becomes part of a college study, attempting to gauge the intelligence and overall potential of African Americans. Octavian's mother dies from a college-mandated smallpox inoculation, and Octavian is forced to see the world for what it is. The Pox Party, part one, is told in Octavian's voice while The Kingdom on the Waves is told in a sequence of letters. The novel is praised for its creativity and chaotic storyline. Teenagers are able to understand and relate to the story without having to know all the historical details in the novel. This novel has also attained its prestigious reputation based on the effort Anderson dedicated to researching the historical aspects of the book. Anderson tried to make the language as accurate to the time period, the 18th century, as possible.

== Burger Wuss ==
Burger Wuss is another young adult novel. The story focuses on the teenage narrator, Anthony, who gets a job at a local burger joint in order to exact revenge upon another employee at the restaurant: Turner, the boy who stole Anthony's girlfriend. This novel is praised for its use of black humor, satirical tone, and overall witty sarcasm, similar to many of Anderson's other works. Burger Wuss stood out in the eyes of critics for its ability to show the darker aspects of day-to-day life.

== Children's books ==
Anderson has also written picture books and books for pre-teens. His picture books include Handel, Who Knew What He Liked, and Strange Mr. Satie. Anderson utilized his knowledge and taste for music in Handel, Who Knew What He Liked, a story of the German-English composer, George Frideric Handel. Anderson's story has been praised for its simplicity and easy-to-read sentences. Strange Mr. Satie is the story of the less known Erik Satie, who influenced modern music. His choice to focus on Satie is noted as an "offbeat" choice, but the book is also held in high regard for its unique style, and text that reflects Satie's own musical style.

For pre-teens Anderson has written a whimsical chapter book, The Game of Sunken Places. The story involves two young boys, Gregory and Brian, who discover a game board in the woods and are pulled into an alternate reality in order to play the game. The boys have to overcome various fantasy-based obstacles including trolls, and monsters, while making their way through the rules and dimensions of the game. The book is said to contain climactic surprises, and is praised for its humor, creativity, and adventurous nature.

== Awards and honors ==
Year	Title	Award	Category	Result	Ref
2002	Handel, Who Knew What He Liked	Boston Globe–Horn Book Award	—	Honor Book	
2002	Feed	National Book Award	Young People's Literature	Finalist	
2003	Feed	Boston Globe–Horn Book Award	—	Honor Book	
2003	Feed	Golden Duck Awards	Hal Clement Award for Young Adults	Winner	
2006	The Pox Party	National Book Award	Young People's Literature	Winner	
2007	The Pox Party	Michael L. Printz Award	—	Honor Book	
2007	The Pox Party	Boston Globe–Horn Book Award	—	Winner	
2009	The Kingdom on the Waves	Michael L. Printz Award	—	Honor Book	
2018	The Assassination of Brangwain Spurge	National Book Award	Young People's Literature	Finalist	
2019	Feed; The Pox Party; The Kingdom on the Waves	Margaret Edwards Award	—	Winner	
2024	The Collectors: Stories	Michael L. Printz Award		Winner	
2024	Elf Dog and Owl Head	Newbery Honor Book		Honor Book	

== Selected works ==
=== Novels ===
- Thirsty (1997)
- Burger Wuss (1999)
- Feed (2002)
- Landscape with Invisible Hand (2017).
- The Assassination of Brangwain Spurge, illustrated by Eugene Yelchin (2018).
- Elf Dog and Owl Head (2023)
- Nicked (2024)

The Astonishing Life of Octavian Nothing, Traitor to the Nation

1. Volume I: The Pox Party (2006)
2. Volume II: The Kingdom on the Waves (2008)

Pals in Peril series

1. Whales on Stilts (2005)
2. The Clue of the Linoleum Lederhosen (2006)
3. Jasper Dash and the Flame-Pits of Delaware (2009)
4. Agent Q, or, The Smell of Danger (2010)
5. Zombie Mommy (2011)
6. He Laughed with His Other Mouths, illustrated by Kurt Cyrus (2014)

Norumbegan Quartet

1. The Game of Sunken Places (2004)
2. The Suburb Beyond the Stars (2010)
3. The Empire of Gut and Bone (2011)
4. The Chamber in the Sky (2012)

=== Nonfiction ===
- Symphony for the City of the Dead: Dmitri Shostakovich and the Siege of Leningrad (2015)

=== Graphic novels ===
- Yvain: The Knight of the Lion, with Andrea Offermann (2017)
- The Daughters of Ys, with Jo Rioux (2020).

=== Short fiction ===
- "Barcarole for Paper and Bones", Shelf Life: Stories by the Book, edited by Gary Paulsen. (Simon & Schuster, 2003).
- "A Brief Guide to the Ghosts of Great Britain" (memoir), Open Your Eyes: Extraordinary Experiences in Faraway Places, edited by Jill Davis. (Viking, 2003). Reprinted in the September/October 2005 issue of the young adult literature magazine Cicada.
- "The Mud and Fever Dialogues", Sixteen: Stories About That Sweet and Bitter Birthday, edited by Megan McCafferty. (Three Rivers Press, 2004).
- "Watch and Wake", Gothic: Ten Original Dark Tales, edited by Deborah Noyes. (Candlewick, 2004).
- "My Maturity, In Flames", Guys Write for Guys Read, edited by Jon Scieszka. (Viking, 2005).
- "The Old, Dead Nuisance" (2011)
- "The Bug Out Bag: What You Need to Stay Alive" (2012)
- "Bug Out: What to Do When It's Time to Get Out of Dodge" (2012)

=== Picture books ===
- Handel, Who Knew What He Liked (2001), illustrated by Kevin Hawkes — biography of George Frideric Handel
- Strange Mr. Satie (2003)
- Me, All Alone, at the End of the World (2004)
- The Serpent Came to Gloucester (2005)
