= The Astonishing Life of Octavian Nothing, Traitor to the Nation, Volume I: The Pox Party =

2006 novel by MT Anderson

- Front cover of first edition, later state with awards medals
- Author: M. T. Anderson
- Language: English
- Genre: Young adult fiction
- Publisher: Candlewick Press
- Publication date: September 12, 2006
- Publication place: United States
- Media type: Print
- Pages: 368
- ISBN: 978-0-7636-2402-6
- LC Class: PZ7.A54395 Ast 2006
- Followed by: Vol II: The Kingdom on the Waves

The Astonishing Life of Octavian Nothing, Traitor to the Nation, Volume I: The Pox Party is an American historical novel for young adults written by M. T. Anderson and published by Candlewick Press in 2006. It won the annual U.S. National Book Award for Young People's Literature and the American Library Association named it a Printz Honor Book, one of four runners-up for the annual Michael L. Printz Award recognizing literary excellence in books for young adults.

The Astonishing Life is set in 18th-century Boston during the time of the American Revolutionary War. A sequel was published two years later, The Astonishing Life of Octavian Nothing, Traitor to the Nation, Volume II: The Kingdom on the Waves (Candlewick, 2008).

== Summary ==
The greater part of the story is told by a boy named Octavian, who grew up with his mother Cassiopeia, an African princess, in a house full of philosophers and scientists in colonial Boston. Under the watchful eyes of Mr. Gitney, also known as 03-01, Octavian has received a classical education as well as a musical education which has made him into an extremely skilled violinist. Octavian eventually comes to understand the price of his powdered wigs and education: he is not only the "property" of Mr. Gitney, but he is also being used as an experiment to test whether the African race is inferior to the European race.

In time, Cassiopeia angers the scientists' benefactor and the Society loses its monetary support. The two are forced to go under the new watchful eye of Richard Sharpe, who cuts Octavian off from his books. It is later revealed that Richard Sharpe works for a group of colonial businessmen, who now fund the house where Octavian is held. These businessmen own slaves, and it is strongly implied that Sharpe is attempting to bias the experiment with Octavian in order to prove that Africans are inferior. He does this by stopping most of Octavian's education and making him work in the house.

When the political unrest that would later spur the American Revolution begins to seep into the Gitney household, Gitney decides to move into the countryside outside of Boston, and then hold a Pox Party. Each attendee is infected with the pox, with the hope that under this controlled circumstance they will have only benign cases. Gitney also wants to both weaken and quarantine his slaves when he begins to hear talk of a slave revolt. Cassiopeia, however, is killed by the pox, and after her death is dissected by the scientists in the house. Octavian discovers what the scientists are doing and in his anger flees the house, and ends up in the Colonial Army.

Octavian's military adventures are narrated mostly in epistolary form by Private Evidence Goring in letters to his sister Fruition. Octavian is eventually recaptured, and back at the Gitney house he is kept chained and completely alone. When Sharpe and Gitney, as well as his former classics teacher Dr. Trefusis, eventually decide to speak with him, Octavian is furious to discover that, with many of their funds coming from plantation owners in Virginia, they are counting on Octavian to fail, and to prove the "inferiority" of the African race.

Dr. Trefusis slips tranquilizers into the tea of the other members of the college, allowing him and Octavian to escape into Boston. Octavian wonders whether the rebels or the British army offer him the greatest opportunity of safety.

== Characters ==
- Octavian: A boy of African descent, and although he is brought up in luxury for much of his childhood, he is technically a slave in the Gitney household and the subject of the great experiment. He is a very quiet person, and is very skilled in many areas including violin, and languages–he is fluent in Greek, Latin, and French.
- Cassiopeia: Octavian's Mother and an "African princess" known for her superior wit and great beauty. At age 13 and pregnant, she was sold into slavery and purchased by Mr. Gitney.
- Mr. Gitney (03-01): The head of the Novanglian College of Lucidity and the owner of Cassiopeia and Octavian.
- Dr. Trefusis (09-01): Octavian's classics teacher.
- Lord Cheldthorpe: A Lord from England who comes to the colonies to see if he wants to continue the monetary support that his deceased uncle formerly provided for the Novanglian College of Lucidity. He has an especial fondness for Cassiopeia, but she refuses to return to England with him when he says that they can not marry; he quarrels with Octavian and Cassiopeia, who are brutally punished. He then refuses to continue supporting the Society.
- Bono: A slave in the Gitney household whose full name is "Pro Bono", because when his mother was purchased she was pregnant, so he was an added "bonus". Bono and Octavian become good friends, and when Bono is sold to a Southern owner, he leaves Octavian with a means to escape. He makes a book of torture instruments which is discovered by Sharpe and subsequently destroyed.
- Mr. Sharpe: The man funds the Novanglian College of Lucidity when Lord Cheldthorpe refuses to continue his support. He strives to prove that Africans are inferior to please his plantation-owning patrons in the South.
- Evidence Goring: A private in Octavian's regiment who befriends him.
- Fruition Goring: Private Evidence's sister, to whom many of Evidence's letters are addressed.

== See also ==
- M. T. Anderson
- American Revolution
- Boston, Massachusetts
