= Gramps and the Fire Dragon =

2000 children's book by Bethany Roberts

- Author: Bethany Roberts
- Illustrator: Melissa Iwai
- Language: English
- Genre: Children's fiction
- Published: Spring 2000 (Note: Listed with a 1997 date (predating its official publication) in Gale's Something About the Author series.)
- Publisher: Clarion Books
- Publication place: United States
- Pages: 32
- ISBN: 0-395-69849-9

Gramps and the Fire Dragon is a 2000 book by children's author Bethany Roberts, with illustrations by Melissa Iwai. The book, which tells of a grandson and grandfather who must escape a dragon that emerged from the flames of their fireplace, was published to positive reviews.

== Plot ==
One night, a boy named Jesse asks his grandfather (nicknamed "Gramps") for a bedtime story near their fireplace. The latter tells of a dragon within the flames, which grows in size and prompts the two to escape from its path until Jesse extinguishes it with a water hose.

== Development ==
Illustrator Melissa Iwai, who hailed from Lompoc, California, respectively modeled Jesse and Gramps after her husband Denis (via portraits from his youth) and Denis' own father.

== Reception ==
Amid positive press, reviewers noted the fast-paced proceedings in Gramps and the Fire Dragon, and also noted that Jesse and his grandfather's victory was never in doubt for the sake of young readers. Barbara Buckley of the School Library Journal commended the friendliness of the titular dragon's design, and "the use of two-page spreads [which] highlights the crisis spots in the text." Shelle Rosenfield of Booklist said, "[Their] adventure ends on a warm, comforting sleepy-time note, as it celebrates both the delights of storytelling and the special relationship between grandparent and grandchild.... The exciting and sometimes silly story conveys a message about love and sharing". In 2001, Gramps was honored as a Children's Choice selection by the International Reading Association and Children's Book Council.
