= The Game of Sunken Places =

2004 book by MT Anderson

- Front cover of The Game of Sunken Places
- Author: MT Anderson
- Genre: Young Adult, Fantasy
- Publisher: Scholastic Paperbacks
- Publication date: September 1, 2005
- Media type: Print (paperback)
- OCLC: 973578476

The Game of Sunken Places, first published by Scholastic Paperbacks in 2004, is a children's fantasy novel by M. T. Anderson. It is the first of the Norumbegan Quartet which continues in The Suburb beyond the Stars (2010), The Empire of Gut and Bone (2011), and The Chamber in the Sky (2012).

== Plot summary ==
The book follows the story of two boys in their teen years: Brian and Gregory, who are friends, but complete opposites. They visit a mansion in Vermont owned by Gregory's Uncle Max. Uncle Max is a strange man who uses archaic words such as "effluents" and behaves very much like an Edwardian-era aristocrat. The two boys uncover the board of the Game of Sunken Places in the nursery, and unintentionally set the game into motion. They also meet Gregory's cousin Prudence, a girl from the area. Thus, they become involved in an age-old ritual conflict between enchanted supernatural races.

Once they go out into the woods and begin playing the game, they meet unlikely allies, such as Kalgrash the troll, and work together to accomplish all the challenges, using the game board as a map. In the final challenge, Gregory is about to win, and Brian is being strangled by Jack Stimple. By believing that Jack was their opponent, the two almost fell into his trap. But Jack was not playing the game at all; Gregory was the player for the Thusser Hordes, and was about to win when Brian stopped him. Jack Stimple was dragged away by monks for strangling Brian. Gregory trusts Brian, and lets him win the game, and so another battle was won in the name of the Norumbegans. It is revealed that Prudence is the one who originally came up with The Game.

== Reception ==
The Game of Sunken Places received starred reviews from Publishers Weekly and Booklist, as well as positive reviews from LitPick, and Kirkus Reviews.
