= The Astonishing Life of Octavian Nothing, Traitor to the Nation, Volume II: The Kingdom on the Waves =

2008 historical novel by Matthew Tobin Anderson

- Author: M. T. Anderson
- Language: English
- Genre: Young adult fiction
- Publisher: Candlewick Press, Somerville, Massachusetts
- Publication date: October 14, 2008
- Publication place: United States
- Media type: Print
- Pages: 592 pp
- ISBN: 978-0-7636-2950-2
- OCLC: 192080654
- LC Class: PZ7.A54395 Asu 2008
- Preceded by: Vol I: The Pox Party

The Astonishing Life of Octavian Nothing, Traitor to the Nation, Volume II: The Kingdom on the Waves (2008) is a historical novel written for young adults by M. T. Anderson and published by Candlewick in 2008, and a sequel to Volume I: The Pox Party (2006). The American Library Association named it a Printz Honor Book, one of four runners-up for the annual Michael L. Printz Award recognizing literary excellence in books for young adults.

== Characters ==
- Octavian: A boy of African descent, and technically a slave in the Gitney household, although he is brought up in luxury for much of his childhood. He is very skilled at the violin, quiet, and is fluent in Latin, French, and Greek.
- Mr. Gitney (03-01): The head of the Novanglian College of Lucidity, a group of scientists and philosophers, and the owner of Octavian.
- Dr. Trefusis (09-01): Octavian's classics teacher.
- Bono: A slave in the Gitney house whose full name is "Pro Bono". Bono and Octavian become good friends, until Bono is sold South, at which point he leaves a house key for Octavian in case Octavian ever wants to escape. After Bono is sent south we learn that he has escaped his new master.

== Analysis ==
A School Library Journal article states that when viewed within the framework of Gothic fiction, the Novanglian College of Lucidity can be equated with the "Gothic Castle" and the professors with "monsters".

== See also ==
- M. T. Anderson
- American Revolution
- Boston, Massachusetts
