= Invisible (Hautman novel) =

2005 novel by Pete Hautman

- First edition cover
- Author: Pete Hautman
- Publisher: Simon & Schuster
- Publication date: June 1, 2005
- Pages: 160
- ISBN: 0-689-86800-6

Invisible is a 2005 young adult novel by American author Pete Hautman, detailing a 17-year-old boy's battle with his inner demons/mental illness and his descent into insanity. It won the 2006 Wisconsin Library Association Children's Book Award. The American Library Association's Young Adult Library Services Association (YALSA) named it one of the best books for young adults of 2006.

== Plot summary ==
Douglas Hanson, or Dougie as he is referred to by his bestfriend, begins the story by talking about his best (and only) friend, Andrew (Andy) Morrow. Athletic and popular, Andy is very different from socially inept Dougie, yet the two find things to talk about. However, as the story progresses it becomes evident that Andy and Dougie's friendship is not what it seems to be at first. Dougie also is suicidal and has an obsession with a train set he inherited from his grandfather. He creates, a town involving the trains, called Madham and obsessively builds a replica of the Golden Gate Bridge using match sticks in the basement of his parents' home. Dougie appears to be unaware he has some form of mental illness (potentially PTSD, schizophrenia, pyromania), although what type of mental illness he struggles with is never discussed. He often views others as being different or abnormal. Dougie claims he is not a troubled youth, but others seem to see him as such, and he engages in troublesome activities: stalking and prank calling. As the book progresses, Dougie mentions attending (and skipping) therapy sessions and not taking the medications he had been prescribed for anxiety. After an incident at school, Dougie eventually admits to his psychologist that he hasn't been taking his medications and is also forced to remember a fateful night at the Tuttle Place. Dougie initially seems to come to terms with this reality during the therapy session, but afterwards convinces himself the illusory manifestations are also real.

In the end, he sets a series of events in place that have dire consequences for him that lead to his hospitalization. However, it is debatable as to Dougie's fate since he was hospitalized at the "Madham Burn Unit". He also mentions the hospital smells of burning plastic, referring to the plastic people in Madham, present when he set the town on fire, and he wants to find his grandfather, to see if he is mad about the train. Whether it is his imagination that leads him to smelling burnt plastic and seeing "Madham Burn Unit" or otherwise is not revealed.

== Reception ==
Publishers Weekly called Invisible "painfully sad" while highlighting "the wisecracking but clearly unreliable voice of its narrator", which they compared to the narrator in Mark Haddon's The Curious Incident of the Dog in the Night-Time. Kirkus Reviews also discussed the "unreliable narration", comparing it to the works of William Faulkner.

According to Booklist's Ilene Cooper, "Hautman does a superb job of crafting the odd sanctuary that is Doug’s mind", with Publishers Weekly similarly praising Hautman's "keen ability for characterization", as well as how he "expertly teases out the truth about a tragic incident ... that propels the story to its horrific conclusion." Kirkus discussed how the novel's "the deceptively simple prose doesn’t keep secrets from its readers." Cooper agreed, writing, "The truth about Andy won’t come as a surprise, but there are some unexpected plot turns here, and the chilling but ambiguous denouement is definitely unsettling." Kirkus concluded that "Dougie’s harrowing mysteries are no less tragic for their visibility."

In 2006, Invisible won the Wisconsin Library Association Children's Book Award, and the Young Adult Library Services Association named it one of the year's best books for young adults.
