= Anna Sheehan =

American writer and novelist

- Born: Wisconsin
- Occupation: Novelist
- Writing career
- Genre: Young adult fiction
- Notable awards: Golden Duck Award, 2012
- Website: annasheehan.com

Anna Sheehan is an American writer and novelist, best known as the author of A Long, Long Sleep.

== Biography ==
Sheehan was born and raised in Wisconsin. Her mother is a veterinarian. In her early years Sheehan was involved with the Young Shakespeare Players of Madison, Wisconsin and historical re-enactment. She began writing as a teenager.

== Work ==
One of her short stories, "Stay", was published in The Pen and the Key: 50th Anniversary Anthology of Pacific Northwest Writers in 2005. In 2011 Candlewick Press released A Long, Long Sleep in the United States, Sheehan's first published novel. It was subsequently published internationally. The book was partly inspired by the fairy tale Sleeping Beauty, Blake Snyder, and "The Great Wave" by David Hackett Fischer.

In addition to numerous positive reviews, it won the 2012 "Hal Clement" Golden Duck Award for Young Adult literature. According to WorldCat, the book is held in 210 libraries

The sequel to A Long, Long, Sleep entitled No Life but This was published by Gollancz December 18, 2014.

December 10, 2015, Anna Sheehan published her novel Spinning Thorns with Gollancz. It is also based on Sleeping Beauty, but set as a retelling and extension of the story.
