= Thirsty (novel) =

1997 horror novel by M. T. Anderson

- First edition
- Author: M. T. Anderson
- Language: English
- Genre: Horror
- Publisher: Candlewick Press
- Publication date: 1997
- Publication place: United States
- Media type: Print
- Pages: 256 pp
- ISBN: 978-0-7636-3895-5

Thirsty is a 1997 horror novel written by M. T. Anderson. It is set in modern Clayton, Massachusetts. The main character, Christopher, just wants a normal life; to date his crush Rebecca Schwartz, stay up late, and other teenager things. Unfortunately, Chris has much more to worry about than puberty — he also has to deal with his vampirism.

== Plot summary ==
The story is set in the town of, and in the areas surrounding, Bradley, Massachusetts. A vampire lord, Tch'muchgar, is magically imprisoned in isolation at the bottom of the town reservoir. The townsfolk performs rituals at the annual The Sad Festival of Vampires to maintain the bonds holding Tch'muchgar prisoner.

Early in the book the young "hero", Chris, witnesses a vampiress being lynched. Soon after, he starts to feel a strange sensation — a growing thirst for blood. Chris later notices that his friend Tom is casting a reflection on the water of the reservoir but Chris himself has no reflection. He realizes that he must be suffering from vampirism. Chris is afraid to tell anyone, even his friends, because vampires are killed immediately upon being discovered.

Chris is soon confronted by a mysterious person dressed in black, who introduces himself as Chet the Celestial Being. Chet says that he serves the Forces of Light, and that he can cure Chris of his vampirism. But first Chet must place a holy object, The Arm of Moriator, with Tch'muchgar. Once activated, the Arm cannot be moved or deactivated by evil beings. Chet explains that if Tch'muchgar tries to escape from his prison, the Arm will cause him to become trapped between worlds, just like "opening an elevator between floors".

Chet leaves for two weeks to retrieve the Arm. Meanwhile, Chris's vampirism grows at a steady rate. He starts sleeping during the day and staying awake at night. He drinks warm water to simulate drinking blood, and even considers his family as potential "beverages". Chris also begins receiving letters through mail from vampires living underground in the community. One of these letters is from a female vampire named Lolli, who appears to be Chris's age and behaves like a popular adolescent girl.

Chris starts to notice he is being stalked by a creepy humanoid figure he describes as "The Thing with the One-Piece Hair", or simply The Thing. The Thing corners Chris in the woods, but Chet appears and "kills" The Thing. He warns Chris that The Thing is not really dead and will rematerialize within a few minutes. So Chet places a mark on Chris' wrist, which he said will protect him from the Thing. Chet gives Chris the Arm and bring him to a congregation of vampires in an abandoned church. Chris is accepted as a vampire by the others and learns that they plan to summon Tch'muchgar. He takes this opportunity to enter the realm of Tch'muchgar and drops the Arm.

Chris returns to his "normal" life and waits for Chet to return with further instruction. His vampiric symptoms continue to grow. Crazed with thirst, Chris almost bites his friend's dog. He resorts to going hunting for raccoons to drink from. After he cuts himself shaving for the first time, Chris begins drinking his own blood. He eventually resorts to biting himself in the arm.

One evening, his mother tells him a story about how Chris nearly died as a newborn, but that a strange nurse took him away for a few minutes. When she brought him back, he was fine. His mother believes that the woman was an angel. Chris fears that the nurse must have been a vampire who infected him with vampirism to save his life.

At the Sad Festival of Vampires, Chris is talked into going to a party with Lolli and another young vampire called Bat. They tell him that to become initiated into the vampire community he must make his first kill that night and smear his blood on his cheeks. Chris shies away from the challenge, saying that he couldn't find anyone yet, but Lolli quickly calls his bluff. Chris escapes from the party and finds his crush, Rebecca Schwartz, in the area. He tells her that he needs to talk, but his teeth start to grow in bloodlust. Chris flees back to the vampire party, only to find that everyone save one high student has left.

The student tells Chris that Lolli killed a student. Afterwards, she was hit by a car and broke her back. The authorities arrived and took her to be killed. Chris hears Bat coming, and runs outside. He meets Chet, who confirms the story about Lolli's death. Bat hears this and attacks Chet, but Chet makes Bat vanish with a wave of his hand, presumably killing him.

At the climax of the story, Tch'muchgar attempts to leave his prison but is shoved out of the dimension and into nonexistence by the Arm of Moriator. Chet reveals that he was actually working for Tch'muchgar, who had realized that he would never escape his prison and was looking for a way to end his miserable life. He also taunts that he was lying about being able to help Chris, because vampirism is incurable. Chet gleefully points out to Chris that he is now doomed. If he kills mortals for blood, they will eventually hunt him down and execute him. If he refuses to drink blood, he will die. If he seeks help from the Forces of Light, they will torment him in place of the vampire lord. If he tries to get help from other vampires, they will kill him themselves for destroying their god.

At the end of the story, in Chris's home, his mother is suspicious, and wants him to be tested for vampirism. His brother treats this with derision, but Chris wonders how his mother would react. He has a flashback to when he was young, that a mother bird would not take in her own child if it had been touched by a human; it would rather bash its skull in. The flashback ends with some older boys throwing stones at a hatchling, yelling "This is mercy!" with other children joining in.

As the book ends, Chris's fate is uncertain, leaving the main plot of the book unresolved though Chris is certainly doomed either way. In the end, Chris realizes that he needs to feed, but he cannot feed.

== Reviews ==
The novel garnered mostly upbeat reviews. The Bulletin of the Center for Children's Books said "it...is smart, taking the old vampire story and really thinking about it rather than merely letting the vampire go through his traditional paces" while Publishers Weekly commented "The overtly supernatural climax and a disappointing plot twist squelch the sparkle of Anderson's prose somewhat".
