= Follow Me! (book) =

1998 children's book

- Author: Bethany Roberts
- Illustrator: Diane Greenseid
- Language: English
- Subject: Aquatic life
- Genre: Children's fiction
- Published: October 1998
- Publisher: Clarion Books
- Publication place: United States
- Pages: 32
- ISBN: 0-395-82268-8

Follow Me! is a 1998 children's book by Bethany Roberts, with illustrations by Diane Greenseid. The tale of an octopus family who meets their grandrelative, it received mixed reviews alongside criticism over Greenseid's art and style.

== Synopsis ==
A mother octopus and her children swim for a visit to the latter's grandmother, who lives in a pirate-ship wreck. Along the way, they meet a variety of sea creatures while watching out for an "eel with pointy teeth".

== Background ==
Follow Me! was published by Houghton Mifflin's Clarion Books, the same imprint responsible for Bethany Roberts' Holiday Mice series. A year prior to release, Gale Research's Something About the Author series listed it as a work in progress from its Los Angeles-born illustrator, Diane Greenseid.

== Reception ==
Reviews for Follow Me! were mixed, with criticism directed at Greenseid's art and style. Writing for the School Library Journal, Patricia Manning felt that the "cheerful" rhymes and "pleasant production" were at odds with the octopus designs, which resembled "a flotilla of pink, eight-tailed tadpoles." Publishers Weekly was similarly critical, calling it a "waterlogged outing" whose main characters "[are] not creatures many readers would want to cozy up to." Of the text, the PW team said: "Roberts's verse is attuned to the needs of a young audience, with plenty of bounce and onomatopoeia.... [Furthermore, the] story line is familiar but well-wrought". The Horn Book Guide was less enthusiastic, stating, "An unattractive blocky design and bright but boring cartoon artwork illustrate the unsubstantial rhyming text."
