= The Two O'Clock Secret =

1992 children's book

- Author: Bethany Roberts
- Illustrator: Robin Kramer
- Language: English
- Genre: Children's fiction
- Published: September 1992 (Note: Booklist gives a February 1993 date.)
- Publisher: Albert Whitman & Company
- Publication place: United States
- Pages: 32 (unpaged)
- ISBN: 0-8075-8159-3

The Two O'Clock Secret is a 1992 book by children's author Bethany Roberts, with illustrations by Robin Kramer. The book, about a boy's attempt to guard the secret behind his father's birthday, received mixed to positive reviews.

== Synopsis ==
A boy named Michael tries to guard the secret behind his father's birthday and presents as he prepares for the occasion with his sister and mother.

== Reception ==
Reviews for The Two O'Clock Secret were mixed to positive. Writing for the School Library Journal in March 1993, Nancy Seiner criticized the "careless drawing" along with the sibling characters' inconsistent ages and designs. "Children will identify with Michael's [titular] struggle," she said, "but they may be confused by the art." Conversely, Kirkus Reviews and Deborah Abbott of Booklist were both favorable, citing Kramer's watercolor illustrations as "cheery". "In a simple, realistic text," wrote Kirkus, "Roberts does a fine job of building both the anticipation and the concept of keeping a secret, ably abetted by Kramer's [contributions]". Abbott noted the "pleasant twist" and "appealing cover", adding that the book's message about keeping secrets "will not be lost on the read-aloud crowd."
