= Won Ton: A Cat Tale Told in Haiku =

Children's picture book by Lee Wardlaw and Eugene Yelchin

- Author: Lee Wardlaw
- Illustrator: Eugene Yelchin
- Language: English
- Genre: Children's picture book
- Published: 2011 (Henry Holt)
- Publication place: USA
- Media type: Print (hardback)
- Pages: 32 (unpaginated)
- ISBN: 9780805089950
- OCLC: 432594956

Won Ton: A Cat Tale Told in Haiku is a 2011 children's picture book by Lee Wardlaw and illustrated by Eugene Yelchin. Told in senryu, it is about a shelter cat that is adopted by a family.

== Reception ==
A review in Kirkus Reviews of Won Ton wrote "Wardlaw's terse, traditional verse captures catness from every angle, while Yelchin's graphite and gouache illustrations telegraph cat-itude with every stretch and sinuous slink", and Publishers Weekly called it "A surprisingly powerful story in verse."

Won Ton has also been reviewed by Booklist, BookPage, Horn Book Guides, School Library Journal, and Library Media Connection.

It is a 2012 NCTE/CLA Notable Children's Book in the English Language Arts, won the 2012 Lee Bennett Hopkins Award for Poetry, and won the 2013 Beehive Poetry Book Award.
