= H. M. Hoover =

American writer

Helen Mary Hoover
- Born: April 5, 1935; Stark County, Ohio, United States
- Died: August 22, 2018 (aged 83); Locust Grove, Virginia, United States
- Occupation: Writer
- Writing career
- Period: 1969–1996
- Genres: Children's fiction, science fiction

Helen Mary Hoover (April 5, 1935 – August 22, 2018) was an American children's writer.

Most of her science fiction is for older children and often features friendships between those of different generations. Her 1996 novel The Winds of Mars tied for the Golden Duck Awards' Hal Clement division for young adult literature.

Hoover lived for many years in Virginia. She died of cancer, aged 83, in Locust Grove, Virginia, on August 22, 2018.

== Published books ==
- Children of Morrow (1973)
- The Lion's Cub (1974) – historical novel set in the court of Nicholas I of Russia, LCCN 74-8594
- Treasures of Morrow (1976)
- The Delikon (1977)
- The Rains of Eridan (1977)
- The Lost Star (1979)
- This Time of Darkness (1980)
- Return to Earth: a novel of the future (1980)
- Another Heaven, Another Earth (1981)
- The Bell Tree (1982)
- The Shepherd Moon: a novel of the future (1984)
- Orvis (1987)
- The Dawn Palace: The Story of Medea (1988)
- Away Is a Strange Place to Be (1990)
- Only Child (1992)
- The Winds of Mars (1995)
- Whole Truth—and Other Myths: retelling Ancient Tales, with commentaries by Carla McK. Brenner and William James Williams (National Gallery of Art, 1996), LCCN 96-47313
