= Cat Skidoo =

2004 children's book by Bethany Roberts

- Author: Bethany Roberts
- Illustrator: R. W. Alley
- Language: English
- Genre: Children's fiction
- Published: May 2004
- Publisher: Henry Holt & Company
- Publication place: United States
- Pages: 36 (unpaged)
- ISBN: 0-8050-6710-8

Cat Skidoo is a 2004 book by Bethany Roberts, with illustrations by R. W. Alley. About two kittens who cause havoc exploring their home surroundings, it received positive reviews.

== Synopsis ==
Two kittens have fun exploring around the house and the yard in a game called "cat skidoo", "which seems to entail chasing everything that moves while wreaking havoc."

== Background ==
This was the second Bethany Roberts book to feature cats as main characters, after 1997's Cat Parade.

== Reception ==
On its original publication, Cat Skidoo received positive reviews. Booklist, Kirkus Reviews, and the School Library Journal praised Roberts' "rhythmic", "rollicking" rhymes and Alley's watercolor work. SLJ's Marge Loch-Wouters called it a "bouncy tribute to feline exuberance...[f]eaturing plenty of white space and lending a sense of nonstop motion". Booklist's Carolyn Phelan said it was "Fun for reading aloud", adding: "Alley's lively ink drawings make the most of the kittens' innocent curiosity and playful high jinks, giving children lots of visual action to enjoy as the simple story rolls along." According to Kirkus, "The kittens are expressive without being too anthropomorphic." Despite the "anticlimatic ending", Nell Beram of The Horn Book Guide admitted that "for the littlest readers[,] the ride will be worth it."
