= Here Comes the Cat! =

1989 bilingual children's book

- Author: Frank Asch
- Illustrator: Vladimir Vagin
- Language: English; Russian
- Genre: Children's fiction
- Published: 1989
- Publisher: Scholastic
- Publication place: United States
- Pages: Unpaged
- ISBN: 0-590-41859-9

Here Comes the Cat! (Russian: Сюда идёт кот!, romanized: Syuda idet kot!) is a 1989 children's picture book by Frank Asch and Vladimir Vagin, published by Scholastic. Written in both English and Russian, it tells of a settlement of mice threatened by the ominous shadow of a big cat. Reviews were generally positive.

== Plot ==
A mouse in a hot-air balloon sees the large shadow of a cat and proceeds to warn other mice that the cat is coming. Some of these mice then go off to warn others as well. While warning mice on a beach, the original mouse's hot-air balloon gets struck by a bolt of lightning, sending him into the ocean below. He still proceeds to warn sea creatures that the cat is coming, one of them being a large fish who carries the mouse to a nearby town. The mouse races through town, telling people, "Here comes the cat!" They race behind him, worriedly repeating his message and soon gathering into a large crowd. The cat's shadow looms over them but it is revealed that the cat is not only there to eat the mice, but has instead brought a large wheel of cheese for them to enjoy. After the mice eat the cheese, the cat sets off into the horizon, with the original mouse riding on top of it.

== Style ==
Asch's text is in speech balloons, with English above and Russian below divided by a horizontal line.

== Background ==
Author Asch and illustrator Vagin began work on Here Comes the Cat! in 1986 after they attended a Soviet-American children's-literature symposium; Asch based the manuscript on a dream he had afterward. "Relying on translators and couriers to shuttle notes and sketches halfway around the world," The New York Times Book Review reported in 1989, "the two artists [overcame the language barrier and] produced what they say is the first book designed by an American and painted by a Russian." They would later collaborate on other books, including Dear Brother (1992).

== Thematic analysis ==
Judith Gloyer of the School Library Journal wrote, "Workable as a comic-twist story, [Here Comes the Cat!] could also be used as a vehicle to awaken children to such issues as prejudice, intolerance, cold wars, or world peace."

== Reception ==
Although concerned about Asch's several English misspellings, Gloyer gave the book a positive review in the SLJ. "Tiny details in the pictures and word balloons," she said, "make this better for one-on-one sharing than for group study sessions." The New York Times Book Review was less enthusiastic: "Besides the symbolism inherent in the cooperative spirit of the project," said reviewer Arthyr Yorinks, "the work that might result from this kind of cross-pollination could be simply wonderful. I sadly emphasize 'could be,' for 'Here Comes the Cat!' is large on symbolism but lacking in wonder."

== Animated short ==
In 1992, Weston Woods Studios adapted Here Comes the Cat! as a ten-minute animated short.
