= I Can Blink =

Book by Frank Asch

- Author: Frank Asch
- Illustrator: Frank Asch
- Cover artist: Asch
- Language: English
- Genre: children's literature, picture book
- Publisher: Kids Can Press
- Publication date: 1985
- Publication place: United States
- ISBN: 0-919964-69-9

I Can Blink is an American children's picture book written and illustrated by Frank Asch. It was published in 1985 by Kids Can Press and printed by Everbest in Hong Kong.

The book consists of a series of simple sentences, with definite parallel structure. Children are encouraged to put their face through a circle cut out of the book and proceed with the facial actions described.

The book fosters both understanding of animals, of body parts, and of movements.

== Plot ==
Uniquely, the written "plot" starts on the cover, with the phrase "I can blink like an owl." The book continues, encouraging children to sniff like a dog, snap like a turtle, chew like a cow, shake their head like a horse, puff their cheeks like a squirrel, stick out their tongue like a snake, smile like a monkey, scrunch their face like a walrus, and wiggle their nose like a rabbit.

The last page is an image of a flower, which has no associated action or text.
