= 101 Ways to Bug Your Teacher =

Book by Lee Wardlaw

- First edition cover of the book 101 Ways to Bug Your Teacher by Lee Wardlaw.
- Author: Lee Wardlaw
- Language: English
- Genre: Children's fiction
- Publisher: Puffin
- Publication date: 2004-07-21
- Pages: 256
- ISBN: 0-14-240331-8
- OCLC: 61118311
- Preceded by: 101 Ways to Bug Your Parents

101 Ways to Bug Your Teacher is a 2004 children's book written by Lee Wardlaw. It is the sequel to 101 Ways To Bug Your Parents. The book focuses on Stephen Wyatt, a middle school inventor, who must overcome his inventor's block that developed when his parents reveal they are planning to have him skip eighth grade, leaving his friends behind in middle school when he goes off to high school.

The idea for this novel came from Wardlaw's five years of experience as an elementary school educator. The novel was named on the Best Books of the Month list in ALAN, the journal of the National Council of Teachers of English. This book was also chosen as a Children's Choice for 2005.

== Plot summary ==
The story opens with Steve (Sneeze), Hiccup, Goldie, Ace, and Pierre working on their Egyptian history projects. Their teacher, Ms. Pierce (Fierce), has an unusual way of assigning punishments to her students: "the death roll" which is a form of classroom management. Steve's parents tell him that they have already talked to the principals from both schools, so they want him to skip eighth grade and go straight to high school. There are two reasons that Steve doesn't want to go to high school. One reason is that he doesn't want to leave his only friends, that understand him, behind at middle school. The other reason is that Steve thinks he's lost his feel for inventing and he's pretty much giving up on himself. When Hayley confronts him, he kisses her. Sneeze enters the Inventors Club, and his mom has a baby named Alyssa Marie Wyatt, who inherits his terrible allergies.

== Main characters ==
- Stephen "Sneeze" Wyatt: Nicknames Sneeze because of his horrible allergies. He is a child inventor trying to get recognition by using his brilliant inventions. In 101 Ways to Bug Your Teacher, he loses his ability to invent and tries his hardest to discover why.
- Hector "Hiccup" Denardo: Sneeze's best friend (and sometimes not-so-willing test subject), Hiccup Denardo, is a hypochondriac who comes from a large family. He is constantly worried about getting sick, usually going to extremes to prevent becoming ill. He earned his nickname because he tends to get the hiccups whenever he is nervous or excited.
- Hayley Barker: Sneeze's second best friend. She runs the counter at the golf course where Sneeze works. She is usually very calm and collected, but on the inside she grieves the loss of her mother, Alyssa. Hints are dropped throughout the book that she has a crush on Sneeze.
