= Feed (Anderson novel) =

2002 novel by M. T. Anderson

- Cover of Feed
- Author: M. T. Anderson
- Language: English
- Genre: Science fiction
- Publisher: Candlewick Press
- Publication date: 2002
- Publication place: United States
- Media type: Print (hardback & paperback)
- Pages: 320
- ISBN: 978-0-7636-2259-6
- OCLC: 54586791

Feed (2002) is a cyberpunk, satirical, dystopian, young-adult novel by M. T. Anderson, focusing on issues such as American hegemony, corporate power, consumerism, information technology, data mining, and environmental decline, with a sometimes sardonic, sometimes somber tone. From the first-person perspective of a teenaged boy, the book takes place in a near-futuristic American culture completely dominated by advertising and corporate exploitation, corresponding to the enormous popularity of internetworking brain implants called feeds.

== Plot ==
=== Context ===
The novel portrays a near-future in which the feednet, a huge computer network (apparently an advanced form of the Internet), is directly connected to the brains of about 73% of American citizens by an implanted device called a feed. The feed allows people: to mentally access vast digital databases (individually called "sites"); to experience shareable virtual-reality phenomena (including entertainment programs, music, and even others' memories); to continually interact with intrusive corporations in a personal preference-based way; and to communicate telepathically on closed channels with others who also have feeds (a feature called m-chatting).

In the book's setting, the natural environment is deteriorating, with natural clouds having been replaced by trademarked Clouds™, and many parents have their children custom-designed. The corporations responsible for the feed have immense power and even run the school system, which is now known as School™. Throughout the book, corporations appear to hold the true power in the United States, leading to the destruction of the environment and leaving the president virtually helpless as the Global Alliance, a coalition of other countries, begins contemplating war with the U.S.

=== Synopsis ===
Titus and his thrill-seeking teenaged friends meet teen girl Violet Durn, whose critically questioning attitude is completely new to the others. While at a club, a man from an anti-feed organization hacks all of their feeds. They wake up in a hospital to find, for the first time in most of their lives, that their feeds are unavailable: partially deactivated while under repair. During their recovery, Violet and Titus become sweethearts. Eventually, their feeds are repaired enough for them to return to Earth; however, Violet's feed is not completely fixed.

One day, Violet reveals her idea of resisting the feed to Titus. She plans to show interest in a wide and random assortment of products to prevent the corporations that control the feed from developing a reliable consumer profile of her. The two go to the mall and create wild consumer profiles, by requesting information on certain random items, then not buying them. Later, Violet realizes that someone has been accessing her personal information through her dreams; this soon becomes a normal occurrence for many feed users. Violet calls FeedTech customer service but receives no help. Later, she tells Titus that her feed has been severely malfunctioning, and she may even die, having had the feed installed later in life (and so with greater accompanying risk). Due to her deteriorating feed, various parts of Violet's body are shutting down. Throughout the novel, there is also a presence of lesions appearing on the characters' bodies. At first it is something they hide, but eventually, the lesions turn into a trend. Violet, disgusted with this latest fashion, declares that everyone has become the feed. After this outburst, she collapses and is taken to the hospital.

As a side effect of the malfunction, Violet loses memories of the year before she got the feed installed. To avoid losing more memories, she makes large virtual records of things she can remember. She sends them to Titus for safekeeping, but, not knowing how to emotionally handle this burden, Titus deletes them. Violet's body parts continue shutting down. She and her father cannot afford repairs, so they petition FeedTech for assistance.

Meanwhile, an environmental disaster affecting Mexico causes the Global Alliance to prepare to go to war with the United States. Titus drives to Violet's house. He falls asleep shortly after arriving, but, while he sleeps, Violet shares her bad news with Titus in the form of memory: FeedTech has decided not to help Violet because of her bizarre and unreliable customer profile. That weekend, Violet comes to Titus's house to ask him to go with her to the mountains. He is reluctant at first but ultimately agrees. While in the mountains, Violet makes it clear she wants to have sex with Titus, but he refuses because he feels like it would be like having sex with a zombie. They begin arguing and eventually part. On the way home, Violet's arm stops working and when she arrives home her leg fails as well. Titus drives away. The next day, Violet apologizes to Titus via feed, but Titus does not answer.

Several months later, Titus receives a message from Violet's father saying that Violet wanted Titus to know when it was "all over". He informs him that the time has come. Titus goes to Violet's house, where she lies in a coma, barely still alive. Her father blames Titus and shows him memories of parts of her body and brain shutting down and the pain she experienced. He then sarcastically tells Titus to be with "the Eloi". Titus asks what that means, but Violet's father refuses to answer, telling him to look it up. They fight, and Titus goes home. In an act of grief, he sits on his floor naked and orders the same pair of jeans continuously over the feed until he is entirely out of "credit", which is their form of currency.

Two days later, Titus goes to visit Violet again. He tells her any stories he can find in the information available through his feed. Finally, he tells her the story of their relationship in the form of a movie trailer. The book ends with Violet's life systems becoming progressively weaker, and the feed ironically repeating the advertising slogan "Everything Must Go" in progressively smaller font.

== Characters ==
Titus

The narrator Titus is the teenage son of an upper-middle-class family. For the most part, he is content with his consumerist lifestyle. When he meets Violet, Titus begins to help her "resist the feed", but ultimately abandons this project as he gives in to peer pressure and the alluring advertisements. Titus was genetically designed to look like Delglacey Murdoch, a two-star actor.

Violet Durn

Violet is Titus's girlfriend throughout the majority of the novel. She was raised by her eccentric father and was homeschooled. Violet did not get a feed until she was seven, unlike Titus and his friends, whose feeds were implanted when they were infants. Violet views the feed negatively, different from Titus and his friends. She also comes from a lower-middle-class background.

Lincoln "Link" Arwaker

Link is one of Titus's friends. He is described as being very tall and physically unsightly. His family is also depicted as much wealthier than Titus's family. Link is a clone of Abraham Lincoln and lives in a gated community. Calista and Quendy compete for his attention throughout the book.

Marty

Another of Titus's friends, Marty is described as being good at any game. He is loud and obnoxious at times. At the end of the novel, Marty purchases the "Nike speech tattoo", causing him to insert the word "Nike" into all of his sentences.

Calista

Calista is Link's girlfriend throughout most of the novel. She is the ring leader of the group of girls and was the first to get "cosmetic" lesions. Confrontational and outspoken, she instigates a major fight she and the other characters have with Violet.

Loga

Loga and Titus used to be sweethearts. By the start of the book, the relationship has ended, but they are still friends. Loga is the only one of Titus's circle of friends who is not hacked at the Rumbla Spot.

Quendy

Quendy tries to replicate Calista. She tends to be jealous and ever-competing with Calista for attention from Link and the group. After Calista has lesions cut into the back of her neck, Quendy takes the trend to the next level and has lesions cut all over her body in an act of competition. At the end of the novel, Titus and Quendy become sweethearts.

Titus's father (Steve)

Steve is depicted as obsessed with both consumerist desires and status. He works for a corporation, somewhere in the realm of banking, and buys Titus an upcar. Towards the finish of the novel, it is exposed that Steve is possibly having an affair with a woman he works with based on a video from his business trip.

Titus's mother

Titus's mother works in the area of Design. Titus expresses a lack of knowledge towards what either of his parents do for a living.

Titus's kid brother ("Smell Factor")

His real name is never given, and he is referred to by Titus exclusively as "Smell Factor" throughout the story. Often Smell Factor is entranced by his feed. Having no idea of what is going on around him, he shouts out random phrases with no relevance to any given situation.

Violet's father

Along with Violet, her father also has a different kind of feed, referred to as "Feedpack". His feed is much different in that it is a detached backpack with virtual glasses. He is a college professor who uses words most of the characters are unfamiliar with and often frustrates those trying to communicate with him. He teaches programming languages in a historical context. Violet's father is not as wealthy as Titus's parents. Although he was able to afford to send Violet to the moon, he was unable to afford the cost of visiting her when her feed was hacked.

== Style ==
The novel contains heavy satire of the imperialist, consumerist and corporate United States. Anderson presents a futuristic sociocultural downfall of the United States, portraying a deterioration of language and thought through the voice of Titus. As the readers are often denied detailed descriptions of the main characters, Anderson creates a sense of apathy and hopelessness in the character's thoughts and actions.

Anderson presents the novel in a first-person narrative through the perspective of Titus. Significant to Anderson's narrative agenda, Titus is often presented as an unlikeable and unpredictable character. The reader is positioned to feel as though they can not rely on Titus's view of the world, as it is often skewed by media, friends, family, and temporarily by Violet. Titus's perspective also plays an important role in explaining the conditions of society—he speaks in the contemporary vernacular, expresses apathy towards the political events, and detests learning anything beyond what is required of him in School™. In spite of this, Violet observes that Titus is also the only person amongst his peers to use metaphor, indicating that in spite of his apparent emptiness and vacuity, his perception of the world is somewhat more advanced than that of most other people in this reality.

Another characteristic of Anderson's writing in Feed is his ability to create authentic adolescent voices. Through this sometimes humorous technique, Anderson critiques the negative effects of a loss of independent thought in terms of the character's deteriorating morality.

In addition, the story's text interrupts the narrative with commercials for consumer products, Feedcasts, pop songs, and news snippets. The constant media/consumerist presence positions readers to analyze how adolescents are exposed to consumerism. Eventually, Anderson alludes to America being fired upon with nuclear weapons by the Global Alliance for its industrial crimes. This element lends to the apathetic characterization of the teens in the novel as well as causes the reader to question the moral complexities to understanding a consumerist, globalized world.

== Themes ==
=== Language ===
Even with the quick information access provided by the feed, the vocabularies of characters present in the novel are minimal, though full of futuristic slang. Anderson's use of language mirrors the slang of today's "youth culture", and familiarizes the reader with the likeness between the characters' mode of communicating and the present state of communication of the reader. The degradation of language and heavy use of slang is not only a matter of youth, but also present in the speech of Titus's parents. The novel offers comment on the language use of adults and proves, through examination of Titus's parents, that the adults possess an immature worldview.

Throughout the novel, Anderson emphasizes his created slang and adolescent vocabulary specific to the society in Feed. This extreme emphasis on the nature of the teens' language use corresponds with the theme of the dangers of overpowering consumerism. Even the word choice that characterizes the slang used in the novel carries undertones of advertisements, purchases, and corporation power.

Glossary of terminology from Feed
- banquet: when preceded by a noun referring to an idea or feeling, used particularly to express an abundance of that idea or feeling. For example, a shame banquet, dump banquet, or guilt banquet.
- big: (as an adverb) "very" or "very much"; (as an adjective) "fun."
- bonesprocket: a spoilsport.
- boyf and girlf: literally, "boyfriend" and "girlfriend."
- brag: awesome, amazing, or "cool."
- chat: see m-chatting (a sub-bullet under feed).
- Clouds™: clouds (apparently now owned or produced entirely by corporations).
- conceptionarium: a place where children are designed and developed (outside of women's bodies) from embryos into babies.
- da da da: analogous to "blah blah blah."
- feed: a device implanted in the brains of most individuals (at least in the United States)— which is fused with their biological functions— instantly giving them the ability to mentally access and share vast knowledge bases and personal psychological experiences with others who also have feeds
  - banner: any audio-visual advertisement experienced in the mind of a person with a feed. They may even appear during sleep while the individual is dreaming.
  - feednet: the system of interconnected networks accessed by a person's feed.
  - m-chatting or, simply, chatting: a feature of the feed that allows users to send other users complex linguistic thoughts and feelings in one's mind alone; thus, a form of completely non-behavioral and nonverbal communication. (Throughout the book, m-chatting is represented using italics, as opposed to verbal dialogue which uses quotation marks.)
  - malfunction: a state in which one's feed is temporarily destabilized, causing disorienting feelings and a euphoric high (similar to being intoxicated). For a psychological thrill or recreational reasons, many people with a feed voluntarily go to sites that induce malfunction. To malfunction is also known throughout the novel by many other slang terms, usually to be/go in mal, but also the following: to be raked, to be jazzed, to fugue, going fugue, getting scrambled, and doing the quivers
- freestyle: used as a noun or adverb to refer to sexual intercourse; in particular, conceiving a child without using assisted reproductive technology. Due to the environmental damage, this type of conception is nearly non-existent in the novel's setting.
- junktube: a household tube that transports waste to an incinerator; an invention that has apparently succeeded the waste container.
- limp: "uncool" or unexciting.
- meg: an all-purpose intensifier meaning (as an adverb) "very" and (as an adjective) "awesome/amazing" or "huge/substantial." Presumably an adaptation of the real-world English slang term mega.
- " No wrong": a figure of speech meaning "Don't worry" or "No worries."
- null: boring, bored, or uninterested.
- prong: erection.
- "re: (someone or something)": literally, "regarding (someone or something)." For example, "Is this re: Violet?" means "Is this about/regarding Violet?"
- School™: the educational institution that has replaced state schooling; now privatized by corporations that teach students how to be better consumers using mostly holographic teachers.
- skeeze: used as a noun or verb to mean "flirt."
- skip: (adjective) happy, pleased, or satisfied.
- the spit: (often, the big spit): a popular fashion or trend.
- sprong: To have an erection is to be sprong.
- squeam: squeamish.
- squelch: (adjective) sullied, messy or dirty; (verb) to sully something or to get something dirty.
- to be with: (intransitive verb) to be ready and willing to participate.
- to do (something) slalom: to weave between obstacles in a zigzag pattern.
- unit: a word used as a friendly, slang title to address individual persons, the way teens in real life might address their friends as "dude," "man," "guy," or "girl," or as an interjection also the way real-life teens use the word "dude." An occasional female variation is unette. (A possible play on the corporate perspective of the population as mere pawns in their capitalist agenda.)
- upcar: a car that flies, especially using tubes (rather than roads) and having an autopilot feature. The original vehicle known as the car is referred to in the novel by the retronym down car.
- " What's doing?": a phrase meaning "What's happening?" both literally and as an idiomatic colloquialism or greeting.
- youch: physically attractive: i.e. "hot" or "sexy."
- ?: the question mark has much broader usage as a punctuation mark in the writing of the novel's fictional universe than in ours. In addition to a question, the symbol "?" represents a speaker's tone when the speaker is wondering whether the listener is comprehending, or when the speaker is expressing rhetorical disbelief, doubt, or a guess.

=== Consumerism ===
Anderson depicts the failing futuristic society as an outcome of constant consumerist influence through his characters' dialogue, thoughts, and description of their surrounding environment. His comment on the disintegration of the natural environment aligns with the disposable representation of consumerist desire. The environmental state is presented as the fault of consumerism, as it leads to the characters' lack of political awareness. Anderson shows the characters' complete obliviousness to the dangers of trademarked clouds, meat walls, and toxic oceans, as a result of their feed. The deteriorating environment exemplifies the characters' dependence on consumerism for their sense of identity.

As the novel progresses, the illusion of consumer gratification is represented directly through the girls' near-hourly trips to the bathroom to keep up with the hairstyle and fashion trends. The girls' identity is absent without their ability to adhere to trends and current styles, furthering Anderson's point of dehumanization through a consumerist society. Also highlighted is Anderson's display of a nagging presence of advertisements and propaganda, endlessly directing the characters toward their next purchase.

Titus and his friends receive consumerist influence from constant ad flows through their feeds as well as their buyer's education from School™. The feed itself is considered a tool for education, but it is controlled by major corporations with the intent of creating consumer profiles. In this sense, it is simply another outlet for the consumerist narrative of the novel. Most evident of the feed's anti-education objective is Titus's apparent lack of skills in reading and writing, and his sparse vocabulary. This reinforces the idea that critical thinking is not a necessity in the interest of the corporations.

== Reception ==
Feed has received the following accolades:

- Finalist 2002 National Book Award for Young People's Literature
- Honor 2003 Boston Globe-Horn Book Award for Fiction
- Winner 2003 Golden Duck Awards Hal Clement Award for Young Adults
- Nominee 2005–2006 Green Mountain Book Award

In 2020, Feed landed the 68th spot on the American Library Association's list of most commonly banned and challenged books in the United States between 2010 and 2019.

The New Zealand singer Lorde claims that Feed influenced her when she was writing the critically acclaimed album Pure Heroine.

== Adaptation ==
A feature film adaptation by 20th Century Studios was announced October 22, 2022. Stanley Kalu has been selected to write and direct the adaptation.

== Sources ==
- Blasingame, James. "An Interview with M.T. Anderson." Journal of Adolescent and Adult Literacy. Newark: Sep. 2003. Vol. 47, Iss. 1; pg. 98.
- Hepperman, Christine M. "Feed." The Horn Book Magazine. Boston: Jan/Feb. 2004. Vol 80, Iss. 1; pg. 26.
