= Sweetblood =

2003 book by Pete Hautman

- First edition cover
- Publisher: Simon & Schuster
- Publication date: June 1, 2003
- Pages: 192
- ISBN: 0-689-85048-4

Sweetblood is a 2003 young adult novel by American author Pete Hautman. It is the story of a teenage girl's encounter with the vampire subculture. In 2004, the Young Adult Library Services Association named it among the year's Best Books for Young Adults, and it won the Minnesota Book Award for Best Youth Literature.

== Plot summary ==
"There are only two races that matter: the Living and the Undead.
And with every year that passes, the numbers of Undead grow. It is inevitable."

So says 16-year-old Lucy Szabo. She has a theory: hundreds of years ago, before the discovery of insulin, slowly dying diabetics were the original vampires. Lucy, a diabetic herself, counts herself among the modern Undead. As Sweetblood, Lucy frequents the Transylvania room, an internet chatroom where so-called vampires gather. But Draco, one of the other visitors to Transylvania, claims to be a real vampire—and Lucy's not entirely sure he's kidding. As Lucy becomes more involved with the vampire subculture, the rest of her life comes to seem unimportant. Her grades plummet, her relationship with her parents deteriorates, and her ability to regulate her blood sugar worsens dramatically. Then she meets Draco, face to face, and he invites her into his strange world. Lucy realizes that she needs to make some difficult choices—if it isn't already too late.

== Background ==
Pete Hautman has type 1 diabetes like the main character. Lucy, who was diagnosed at the age of six, believes she developed diabetes after receiving excessive amounts of rabies shots. Lucy's vampire theory is based on author Pete Hautman's own ideas on diabetes and vampirism which he first wrote down in 1978.

Many vampire forums actually exist.
