= Margaret Bechard =

American writer (born 1953)

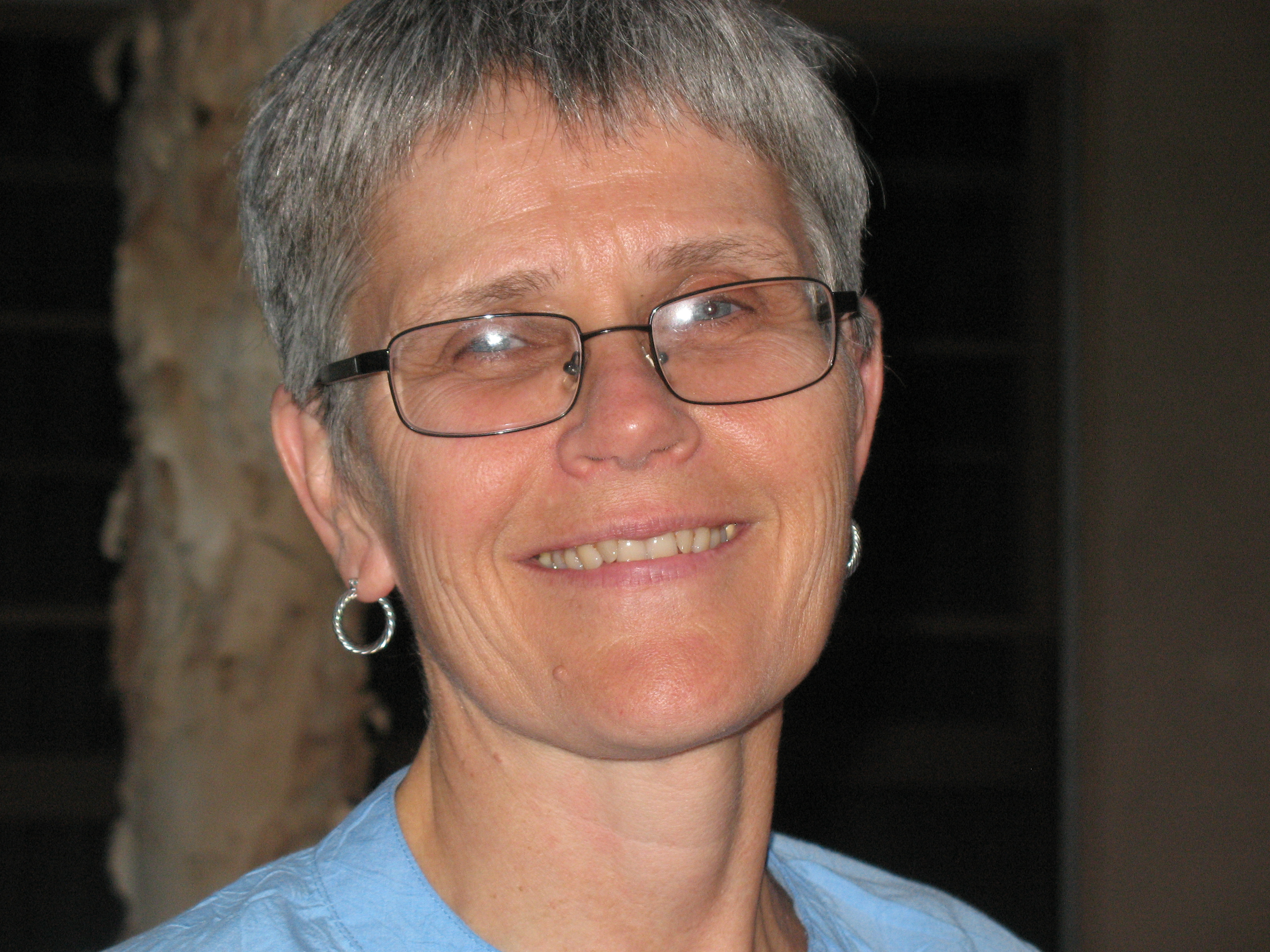
- Born: 1953 (age 72–73); Chico, California, U.S.
- Occupation: Writer
- Writing career
- Period: 1990s-present
- Genres: Science fiction, Children's literature
- Website: www.margaretbechard.com

Margaret Bechard (born 1953) is an American author of contemporary and science fiction for children and young adults.

== Biography ==
Bechard was born in 1953 in Chico, California. She received her bachelor's degree in English literature from Reed College in 1976. She is married to Lee Boekelheide and they have three sons and four grandchildren. She lives in Tigard, Oregon.

Bechard served as the Young People's Literature Chair of the 2006 National Book Award Committee. Her books are published in English, French, Swedish and Korean. She teaches in the MFA in Writing for Children and Young Adults program at Vermont College of Fine Arts.

== Awards ==
In 1996, Star Hatchling, a middle grade novel about first contact, received the Eleanor Cameron Award, a Golden Duck Award for Excellence in Children's Science Fiction.

Hanging on to Max, a story about a teenage father, was an ALA Best Book for Young Adults and School Library Journal Best Book of the Year in 2004.

== Bibliography ==
- My Sister, My Science Report (1990)
- Tory and Me and the Spirit of True Love (1992)
- Really No Big Deal (1994)
- Star Hatchling (1995)
- My Mom Married the Principal (1998) - a sequel to Really No Big Deal
- If It Doesn't Kill You (1999)
- Hanging on to Max (2002)
- Spacer and Rat (2005)
