= Godless (novel) =

2004 young adult novel by Pete Hautman

- Author: Pete Hautman
- Language: English
- Publisher: Simon & Schuster Children's Publishing
- Publication date: 2004
- Publication place: United States
- Media type: Print
- Pages: 208
- ISBN: 0-689-86278-4
- OCLC: 52386196
- LC Class: PZ7.H2887 Go 2004

Godless, a young adult novel by Pete Hautman, was published in 2004 by Simon & Schuster. It won the annual U.S. National Book Award for Young People's Literature.

Godless tells the story of Jason Bock, a fifteen-year-old boy, who questions his father's Catholic religion. Jason invents his own religion, "Chutengodianism". Jason and his fellow "Chutengodians" worship the water tower, dubbed Ten-Legged One. While Jason does not really believe the Ten-Legged One is God, his friend, Shin, does. Jason does not see the consequences of his seemingly obvious jest.

Godless sparks religious controversy as many parents question the motivation behind the story. Pete Hautman responds to this controversy on his webpage.

== Characters ==
=== Main ===
Jason Bock is a large, 15-year-old boy from St. Andrew Valley. Fed up with Catholicism, he invents his own religion, Chutengodianism, worshipping the town water tower. His father forces him to attend weekly Teen Power Outreach meetings, which Jason refers to as brainwashing sessions. He enjoys messing with Just Al, the "head brainwasher,". His best friend, Shin, is a snail farmer. Jason has uncertain feelings for Magda Price. He does not much care for the infamous Henry Stagg and his "three stooges." At first, Chutengodianism seems to be going great. As things progress, Founder and Head Kahuna, Jason, must try to hold his religion together while it decomposes.

Shin (real name: Peter Stephen Schinner) is Jason's best friend and First Keeper of the Sacred Text of Chutengodianism. As a hobby, he farms snails. Shin is Jason's first follower. Unlike the other Chutengodians, Shin takes the religion seriously, believing the water tower is speaking to him. His belief is so deep that he sneaks out during a midnight thunderstorm to climb the water tower, seeking some sort of enlightenment. Jason cannot convince Shin to come back down. Shin wants to swim in the godhead, like the others had done at the first mass.

Dan Grant is Jason's ordinary friend. He is so average that one has to meet him several times before remembering his name. He is a preacher's son and the second acolyte of the "Ten-Legged One". After the fiasco at the water tower, Dan holds a grudge against Jason for getting him in trouble and messing up his life.

Magda Price is a pretty girl who works at Wigglesworth. The third member of the new religion, she joins after overhearing Jason and Shin talking about their new church. They originally disapprove of her joining, but later agree that Chutengodians should not discriminate based on gender. Magda's relationship with Henry Stagg evolves throughout the book. Magda allegedly helps Henry create his commandments for the "Choots", an offshoot of Chutengodianism.

Henry Stagg is the last to join the Chutengodians. Not caring what happens to him or others, Henry is somewhat of a bully to Jason and Shin. He will not hurt innocent victims, but will pick on any able bodied person. He has a collection of Velociraptors in his garage, which he cherishes. He breaks from the Church of the Ten-Legged One, forming the "Choots" with his friends, Mitch Cosmo, Marsh Andrews, and Bobby.

=== Minor ===
Mr. Bock is Jason's devout Catholic father. Bothered by Jason's disbelief in God, he forces him to attend Teen Power Outreach. For most of the story, he disapproves of Jason's new religion, only to accept it at the end of the novel. After the Chutengodians' ill-fated meeting on top of the water tower, Mr. Bock instructs Jason to write book reports on five Catholic books.

Mrs. Bock is Jason's mother. Obsessed with a medical book (which Jason says she reads like the Bible), she loves to diagnose her son with extremely rare conditions. Throughout the story, she worries that Jason has some sort of sleep condition, although he insists that he just likes to sleep.

Father Haynes is the priest at the local Catholic church. Jason finds his sermons and church services boring.

Just Al is the leader of the TPO meetings. Jason refers to him as a "car salesman" with the ability to change the subject to whatever he wants. Jason often finds ways of annoying Al or disrupting the meetings in some way. Al usually responds by changing the subject or giving a small speech about faith and God. He is known for his unique prayers, which typically state something about Jesus being "one cool dude".

The Three Goons, Mitch Cosmo, Marsh Andrews, and Bobby, are Henry Stagg's juvenile delinquents who follow him around and do whatever he tells them to do.

== Themes ==
The teenagers represent the colonization of childhood by adults. Jason and Shin are contrasts in how religion is approached by teens; Jason questions the authority of religion, while Shin accepts it.
