= M. T. Anderson's Thrilling Tales =

Series of children's novels

M. T. Anderson's Thrilling Tales, also known as Pals in Peril, is a series of children's novels by M. T. Anderson. They are part satire of, and part homage to, classic science fiction and action comic books and children's mystery and adventure series like The Hardy Boys and Nancy Drew or Tom Swift. The black-and-white interior illustrations in the series are done by Kurt Cyrus. They are written for somewhat younger readers than Anderson's other books.

The stories follow the bizarre, exciting, and hilarious adventures of three close friends, Lily Gefelty, Katie Mulligan, and Jasper Dash. Each of these friends is very different from one another. They constantly find themselves solving dastardly mysteries and preventing madmen from gaining control of the world.

The first book in the series, Whales on Stilts, was published by Harcourt in 2005. Parts of it were inspired by the work of H.G. Wells and also by John Christopher's Tripod series.

== The books ==
- Whales on Stilts (2005)
- The Clue of the Linoleum Lederhosen (2006)
- Jasper Dash and the Flame-Pits of Delaware (2007)
- Agent Q, or the Smell of Danger! (2010)
- Zombie Mommy (with Kurt Cyrus) (2011)
- He Laughed With His Other Mouths (2012)

== Characters ==
The main characters of the series are:

- Jasper Dash. An inventor with a PhD in Egyptology, Jasper is the hero of a fictional series of books about his adventures as a "Boy Technonaut". He is a parody of the Edisonade hero, a genre exemplified by Tom Swift.
- Katie Mulligan. A middle-school student who fights supernatural evil in her own fictional series, Horror Hollow. She is a parody of/homage to such horror series as Buffy the Vampire Slayer and the Goosebumps series.
- Lily Gefelty. A middle-school student, an average American girl.

== Setting and major themes ==
While the books would appear to be set in the contemporary United States, the world they portray is one where the bizarre and fantastic are constantly present and nearly overpower the "normality". Most of the wacky humor is built around this situation.

Despite the constant use of clever, sometimes random comedy, the series does not lack serious, reflective moments. Friendship is a major theme, and much attention is given to the development of the three major characters. There is also an inherently nostalgic, bittersweet element. Other specific themes include timelessness, the passage of time, whales, immortality, eccentricity vs. conventionality, and down-to-earth earnestness vs. fame and high society.

The villains in the stories are often too comedic or eccentric to be truly frightening. While physical conflict plays a large role, cleverness and gaining understanding of other persons and species also help save the day. The books are recommended for ages ten and up.

Anderson stated that, "As a kid, I loved formula fiction," and, during a conversation with his editor, he thought about how it would be to write a book in that style. "I guess part of the whole thing with the post-modern age is not only did I write a book like that, but I wrote a book about books," he said.

== Reviews ==
A review in Publishers Weekly of Whales on Stilts noted that the "humor is very self-referential", such as when "awkward Harcourt writers" follow Jasper and Katy around. The review praised Cyrus's illustrations, which "riff on comic books and 50s era advertisements". A reviewer from SF Site calls Whales on Stilts a "tasty multilayered satire" and says that, "Anderson's humor is a step beyond that of Lemony Snicket, fearlessly poking fun at the details while never discounting our heroes' courage in the face of danger."
