= Rash (novel) =

Novel by Pete Hautman

- First edition (publ. Simon & Schuster)
- Author: Pete Hautman
- Language: English
- Genre: Science fiction
- Publisher: Simon & Schuster
- Publication date: 2006
- Publication place: United States
- Pages: 249 (first edition)
- ISBN: 9780689868016

Rash is a 2006 novel written by Pete Hautman. It is set in the year 2074, in a futuristic America, that has become obsessed with safety and security. Nearly every potentially unsafe action has been criminalized, to the point that 24% of the population is incarcerated. Ironically, this large criminal population also provides the manpower that fuels the large corporations that now dominate the country.

== Development history ==
Hautman's intent in writing Rash was to consider the consequences of the current trend toward increased safety and security that we see in the United States today.

Almost all the computer systems in the novel are called "WindO", referencing the Microsoft operating system Windows. A "WindO" is a standardized tablet PC that has seemingly replaced any other PC, which is implied to have a similar concept and functionality of an iPad or Samsung Galaxy Tab.

== Reception ==
Kirkus Reviews calls the book "a winner", saying that it is "bitingly funny and unexpectedly heartwarming". In a starred review, Publishers Weekly called this dystopian fantasy of a futuristic nation wracked by litigiousness and terrorism "intelligent and darkly comic".
