= Eugene Yelchin =

American writer (born 1956)

- Евгений Аркадьевич Ельчин
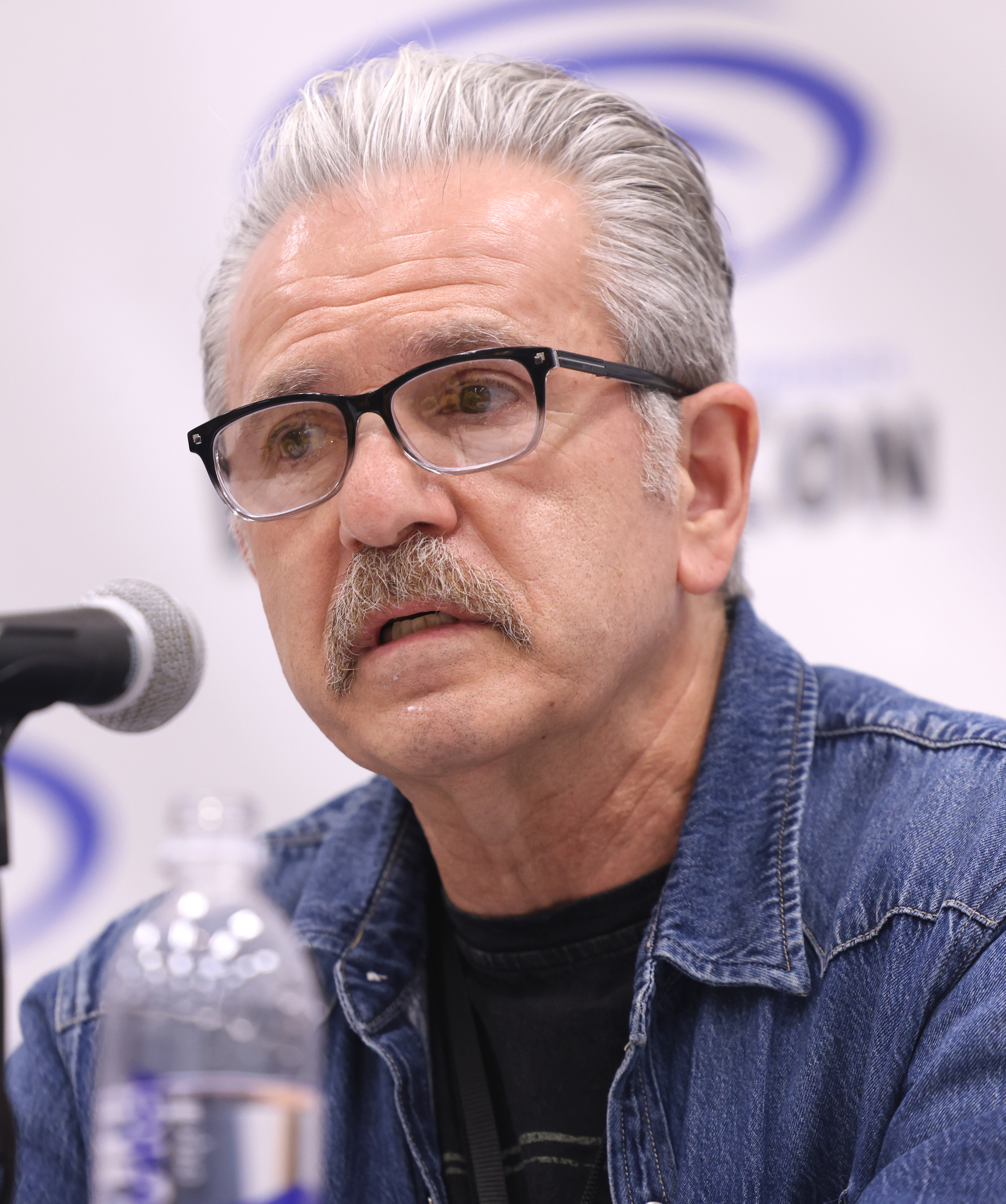
- Yelchin in 2026
- Born: Yevgeny Arkadievich Yelchin; October 18, 1956 (age 69); Leningrad, Soviet Union
- Education: Design, Leningrad Institute of Theater Arts, USSR, 1979; Film, University of Southern California, Los Angeles, USA, 1988
- Occupations: Illustrator, writer, designer
- Relatives: Anton Yelchin (nephew)
- Writing career
- Genres: Books For Young Readers (as author/illustrator); Theater and Film (as designer)

Eugene Yelchin (born Yevgeny Arkadievich Yelchin, Russian: Евгений Аркадьевич Ельчин, born October 18, 1956) is a Russian-American artist best known as an illustrator and writer of books for children and young adults. Yelchin is a National Book Award finalist for The Assassination of Brangwain Spurge co-authored with M. T. Anderson and the recipient of Newbery Honor for Breaking Stalin's Nose. He received Sydney Taylor Award for The Genius Under the Table, Golden Kite Award for The Haunting of Falcon House, Crystal Kite Award for illustrating Won Ton, National Jewish Book Award for illustrating The Rooster Prince of Breslov, and Tomie DePaola Award from the Society of Children Books Writers and Illustrators. His books were named Best Books of the Year by the New York Times, People Magazine, Wall Street Journal, Washington Post, Boston Globe, Publishers Weekly, Kirkus Reviews, Horn Book, USA Today, Amazon, NPR, School Library Journal, and others.

His nephew was actor Anton Yelchin.

== Education and early career ==
Yelchin was born in Saint Petersburg, (Leningrad), Russia, to a Jewish family. In 1979, Yelchin graduated from Leningrad State Theater Academy.

From 1979 to 1983 he designed sets and costumes for leading Russian theater companies including Alexandrinsky (Pushkin's) Theater and Akimov Comedy Theater in Leningrad.

In 1980, with a group of peers from the Theater Academy he co-founded Tomsk Children's Theater in Siberia.

In 1983, Yelchin emigrated to the United States. In 1988, Yelchin graduated from the Southern California Film School in Los Angeles and began directing TV commercials and illustrating advertising campaigns.

== Books for children ==
In 2006 at the Society of Children's Books Writers and Illustrators conference Yelchin received Tomie DePaola Illustration Award and began writing and illustrating books for children.

His books have been published by Scholastic Press, Macmillan Publishers, HarperCollins, Simon & Schuster, Roaring Brook Press, Candlewick Press, and Houghton Mifflin Harcourt. They have been translated into French, Italian, Japanese, Russian, Spanish, Chinese, Korean, Turkish, Romanian, Estonian, and Polish.

=== Selected awards ===
In 2025 I Wish I Didn’t Have to Tell You This received a National Jewish Book Award.

In 2021 The Genius Under the Table: Growing Up Behind the Iron Curtain was awarded the Association of Jewish Libraries Sydney Taylor Honor Award.

In 2018 The Assassination of Brangwain Spurge he co-authored with Matthew Tobin Anderson was named National Book Award Finalist.

In 2012 Breaking Stalin's Nose, a middle grade novel that he wrote and illustrated received the Newbery Honor.

In 2010 his illustrations for The Rooster Prince of Breslov received a National Jewish Book Award.

In 2017 his novel The Haunting of Falcon House received Society of Children's Books Writers and Illustrators’ Golden Kite Award.

In 2011 Won Ton: A Cat Tale Told in Haiku that he illustrated received Society of Children's Books Writers and the Golden Kite Award.

== Bibliography ==
=== As author and illustrator ===
- I Wish I Didn’t Have to Tell You This. 2025. Candlewick Press
- Boar and Hedgehog. 2025. Candlewick Press
- The Genius Under the Table. 2021. Candlewick Press
- Spy Runner. 2019. Henry Holt and Company
- The Assassination of Brangwain Spurge (with M.T. Anderson). 2018. Candlewick Press
- Pip & Pup. 2018. HarperCollins Publishers
- Spring Hare. 2017. Henry Holt and Company
- The Rooster Who Would Not Be Quiet. 2017. Scholastic Press
- The Haunting of Falcon House. 2016. Henry Holt and Company
- Elephant in the Dark. 2015. Scholastic Press
- Crybaby. 2015. Henry Holt and Company
- Won Ton and Chopstick: A Cat and Dog Tale Told in Haiku. 2015. Henry Holt and

Company

- Crybaby. 2015. Henry Holt and Company
- Arcady's Goal. 2014. Henry Holt and Company
- Seeds, Bees, Butterflies and More! 2013. Henry Holt and Company
- Won Ton: A Cat Tale Told in Haiku. 2011. Henry Holt and Company
- Dog Parade. 2011. Houghton Mifflin Harcourt
- Breaking Stalin's Nose. 2011. Henry Holt and Company
- The Next Door Bear. 2011. HarperCollins Publishers
- The Rooster Prince of Breslov. 2010. Houghton Mifflin Harcourt
- Seven Hungry Babies. 2010. Simon & Schuster.
- Heart of a Snowman. 2009. HarperCollins Publishers
- Ghost Files. 2008. HarperCollins Publishers
- Who Ate All the Cookie Dough? 2008. Houghton Mifflin Harcourt
- The Cobbler’s Holiday or Why Ants Don’t Wear Shoes. 2008. Roaring Book

Press

== Paintings ==
Yelchin's paintings and drawings have been exhibited along with former Soviet non-conformist artists

- 2002: "Russian Revolutions: Generations of Russian Jewish Avant-Garde Artists” at the Mizel Center for Arts and Culture
- 2006: “Territories of Terror: Mythologies and Memories of the Gulag in Contemporary Russian-American Art” at Boston University (2006)
- 2010: "Shattered Utopia: Russian Art of the Soviet and Post-Soviet Periods" at Fort Collins Museum of Contemporary Art

Yelchin is a member of the Jewish Artists Initiative of Southern California. His paintings and drawings are represented by Sloane Gallery of Contemporary Russian Art.

== Other works ==
Yelchin created original storyboards for the popular Coca-Cola Polar Bears campaign and designed characters for several animated features including 2012 Oscar winner Rango directed by Gore Verbinski (2012 Oscar for Best Animated Feature).
