= Charles L. Fontenay =

American journalist (1917–2007)

Charles Louis Fontenay
- Born: March 17, 1917; São Paulo, Brazil
- Died: January 27, 2007 (aged 89); Memphis, Tennessee, US

Charles Louis Fontenay (March 17, 1917 – January 27, 2007) was an American journalist and science fiction writer. He wrote science fiction novels and short stories.

His non-fiction includes the biography of the prominent New Deal era politician Estes Kefauver.

Fontenay was editor of the Nashville Tennessean, among other newspapers, worked with the Associated Press and Gannett News Service. He retired to St. Petersburg, Florida, where he continued to write science fiction until shortly before his death.

== Science fiction novels (partial list) ==
- Rebels of the Red Planet (1961)
- The Day the Oceans Overflowed (1964)
- Kipton and the Ovoid (1996)
- Kipton in Wonderland (1996)
- Kipton and the Tower of Time (1996)
- Kipton and the Android (1997)
- Target: Grant, 1862 (1999)
- Modal (2000)

== Short fiction (partial list) ==
- Disqualified (1954)
- Escape Velocity (1954)
- Z (1956)
- Blind Alley (1956)
- Atom Drive (1956)
- The Silk and the Song (1956)
- Family Tree (1956)
- Conservation (1958)
- Service with a Smile (1958)
- Twice Upon a Time (1958)
- The Gift Bearer (1958)
- The Jupiter Weapon (1959)
- Wind (1959)

== Collections ==
- The Collected Works of Charles L. Fontenay, Vol. 1 (1996)
- Here, There and Elsewhen (1998)

== Non-fiction ==
- Epistle to the Babylonians (1969)
- Estes Kefauver: A Biography
