= Waiting-for-Spring Stories =

1984 children's book

- Author: Bethany Roberts
- Illustrator: William Joyce
- Language: English
- Series: Waiting-for Series
- Genre: Children's fiction
- Published: September 1984
- Publisher: Harper & Row
- Publication place: United States
- Pages: 31
- ISBN: 0-06-025061-5

Waiting-for-Spring Stories is the first book by Connecticut children's author Bethany Roberts, published in 1984. It was also one of the first works to feature illustrations by Louisiana artist William Joyce. The book is a collection of seven miniature stories told by a rabbit father during wintertime. Released to critical acclaim, it became the first of three titles in the informally named Waiting-for Series.

== Synopsis ==
During the winter, a rabbit father tells seven stories to his family as they await the coming of spring; each lasts 2–3 pages in the text.

== Background ==
Waiting-for-Spring Stories was the first book written by Bethany Roberts, a children's author from Connecticut, and also one of the earliest stints for Louisiana artist William Joyce as an illustrator. Roberts dedicated the book to "Krista and Melissa who clamor for 'homemade stories'"; both of them were her daughters and served as her inspiration.

== Release ==
Waiting-for-Spring Stories was announced as early as September 1983, when a preview illustration by Joyce appeared in a Shreveport Times article on the artist; the book was published a year later by Harper & Row, and became a Junior Literary Guild selection for fall 1984. For its promotional campaign, Harper & Row issued color posters featuring a selection from Joyce's work. In March 2005, The Seattle Times reported that the book was no longer in print.

== Reception ==
Waiting-for-Spring Stories received a starred review in the School Library Journal. "All [of the stories]," wrote SLJ reviewer Blair Christolon, "provide simple pleasure geared to four year olds' attention spans, but they are sure to be enjoyed by second-grade readers because of the easy vocabulary yet mature appearance of the pages." Similar sentiments were shared by Stephanie Moeller of Kansas' Manhattan Mercury, who also said, "As delightful as the stories are, my favorite aspect of the book is the illustrations.... Joyce's old-fashioned plates [are] reminiscent of Beatrix Potter, but larger and a bit more colorful." The Shreveport Journal also took note of the "child appeal", as did Karen Stang Hanley of Booklist. "[The stories are] simple [and] succinct," remarked the Journal's Nan Bland, "[and] the illustrations will make the book a treasure any child will want to keep for repeat readings."

Barbara Karlin of the Los Angeles Times called it "a charming read-along picture book" buoyed by "the sweet innocence" of Roberts' tales and the "delightful illustrations" from Joyce. Writing for Grand Junction, Colorado's Daily Sentinel, Maxine Curley declared that Roberts and Joyce's skills were "ingenious and imaginative". One of the book's earliest-known reviews—by the Star-Telegram's Raymond Teague, who was looking forward to more from this venture—was among its most enthusiastic:

What stories [Papa Rabbit tells]! They are gems of fanciful humor.... Roberts [pens each of them] in only a few pages of well-chosen words...[and they are] well-planned and neatly ordered. To these stories, Joyce has added charming, old-fashioned drawings.... Waiting-for-Spring Stories is a truly delightful new book that should become a family standard.

== Sequels ==
Though initially intended as a one-shot title, Waiting-for-Spring Stories was followed within the next ten years by Waiting-for-Papa Stories (1990) and Waiting-for-Christmas Stories (1994), forming a trilogy nicknamed the Waiting-for Series; Sarah Stapler replaced Joyce as illustrator on these later instalments.
