= Fourth of July Mice! =

2004 children's book

- Author: Bethany Roberts
- Illustrator: Doug Cushman
- Language: English
- Series: Holiday Mice
- Genre: Children's fiction
- Published: May 2004
- Publisher: Clarion Books
- Publication place: United States
- Pages: 32
- ISBN: 0-618-31367-2

Fourth of July Mice! is a 2004 children's picture book written by Bethany Roberts and illustrated by Doug Cushman, part of the team's Holiday Mice series. The book, about a family of mice celebrating U.S. Independence Day, was published to positive reviews.

== Synopsis ==
A family of mice spend Independence Day holding a parade, playing baseball, swimming in the pool, and enjoying fireworks among other activities.

== Background ==
The book is the seventh (and to date, the last) instalment of Roberts and Cushman's Holiday Mice series, whose title characters previously appeared in Halloween Mice! (1995) and Thanksgiving Mice! (2001).

== Reception ==
Fourth of July Mice! received positive reviews. The School Library Journal called it a "slice-of-life story [that is] slight but pleasant", and Publishers Weekly deemed it a "light, rhymed romp". Writing for Booklist, Connie Fletcher said: "[Fourth of July Mice!] just about gushes red, white, and blue—from the colors of the clothing the family wears to the all-American activities that form the backbone of the book....A charming way to prepare for the holiday." The mice's proceedings "[made for] great fun written in quick, rhyming text" (per Bonnie Fowler of the Winston-Salem Journal), while "very simple language helps kids understand the celebration" (according to Children's Bookwatch).

School Library Journal, Booklist, and Winston-Salem praised Doug Cushman's illustrations, along with The Horn Book (which was otherwise less enthusiastic). "The energetic watercolors," The Horn Book's reviewer said, "capture the holiday spirit better than the lackluster rhyming text, which relies too heavily on repeated words and onomatopoeia." Four years after its publication, the Spartanburg Herald-Journal wrote, "Featuring the Holiday Mice at their most adorable, this story about our nation's birthday will delight readers young and old."
