= Vladimir Vagin (illustrator) =

Russian illustrator of books (born 1937)

Vladimir Vasilʹevich Vagin (born 30 March 1937) is a Russian illustrator of books. With the writer Frank Asch he created Here Comes the Cat! (Si︠u︡da idet kot!), a 32-page children's picture book published by Scholastic Books in 1989. It was awarded the Russian National Book Award and was considered the first Russian-American collaboration on a children's book. A 25th Anniversary Edition of Here Comes the Cat! was reissued in July 2011 by McSweeney's McMullens (bilingual text) OCLC 741310104. Vagin moved to the United States in 1990 and currently lives in Vermont. He and Asch won the Picture Books Golden Duck Award in 1996 for their collaboration Insects from Outer Space (Scholastic, 1995).
