= Pete Hautman =

American author (born 1952)

Peter Murray Hautman (born September 29, 1952) is an American author best known for his novels for young adults. One of them, Godless, won the 2004 National Book Award for Young People's Literature. The National Book Foundation summary is, "A teenage boy decides to invent a new religion with a new god."

== Biography ==
Hautman was born in Berkeley, California on September 29, 1952 and moved to St. Louis Park, Minnesota at the age of five. He graduated from St. Louis Park High School and attended the Minneapolis College of Art and Design and the University of Minnesota during the next seven years without receiving a degree from either institution. After working at several jobs for which he calls himself "ill-suited", Hautman's first novel, Drawing Dead, was published in 1993. He lives with novelist and poet Mary Logue in Golden Valley, Minnesota and Stockholm, Wisconsin.

== Awards and honors ==
- Michigan Library Association "Thumbs Up" Award for Mr. Was (1997) and Rash (2007)
- Minnesota Book Award for Mrs. Million (2000), Sweetblood (2004), Godless (2005) and Blank Confession (2011)
- Wisconsin Library Association Awards for Rag Man (2002) and Invisible (2006)
- National Book Award for Young People's Literature, 2004, Godless
- Los Angeles Times Book Prize for Young Adult Literature, 2011, The Big Crunch
- Edgar Award for Best Juvenile for Otherwood (2018)

== Books ==
=== Young-adult novels ===
- Mr. Was (1996)
- No Limit (1998)(Stone Cold)
- Hole in the Sky (2000)
- Sweetblood (2003)
- Godless (2004)
- No Limit (2005)
- Invisible (2005)
- All-In (2007)
- Full House (2007)
- Rash (2006)
- How to Steal a Car (2009)
- Blank Confession (2010)
- The Big Crunch (2011)
- What Boys Really Want (2012)
- The Klaatu Diskos
  - The Obsidian Blade (2012)
  - The Cydonian Pyramid (2013)
  - The Klaatu Terminus (2014)
- Eden West (2015)

=== Adult novels ===
- Drawing Dead (1993)
- Short Money (1995)
- The Mortal Nuts (1996)
- Ring Game (1997)
- Mrs. Million (1999)
- Rag Man (2001)
- Doohickey (2002)
- The Prop (2006)

=== Middle-grade novels ===
- The Bloodwater Mysteries (co-authored with Mary Logue)
  - Snatched (2006)
  - Skullduggery (2007)
  - Doppelganger (2008)
- The Flinkwater Chronicles
  - The Flinkwater Factor (2015)
  - The Forgetting Machine (2016)
- Slider (2017)
- Otherwood (2018)
