= Birthday Mice! =

2002 children's book by Bethany Roberts

- Author: Bethany Roberts
- Illustrator: Doug Cushman
- Language: English
- Series: Holiday Mice
- Genre: Children's fiction
- Published: October 21, 2002
- Publisher: Clarion Books
- Publication place: United States
- Pages: 32
- ISBN: 0-618-31367-2

Birthday Mice! is a 2002 children's book written by Bethany Roberts and illustrated by Doug Cushman. Part of the informally marketed Holiday Mice series, it received mixed reviews.

== Synopsis ==
When their son turns two, the holiday-celebrating mouse family of four holds a birthday for him in a forest clearing, set to a cowboy theme.

== Reception ==
Reviews for Birthday Mice!, the fifth title with Roberts and Cushman's characters, were mixed. Kirkus Reviews said, "Occasional rhymes and a musical cadence to the text—with its oompah repetition of words—make this a lively performance piece". Conversely, Eileen Sheridan wrote in the School Library Journal: "This is a difficult book to read aloud; the rhyming text doesn't scan, and sometimes the rhymed word doesn't appear until pages later. [Although] Cushman's animals are personable, [the birthday boy's appearance across] four panels [in two instances] is bound to confuse preschoolers, who will see four separate mice.... Not a first purchase." In separate reviews, The Horn Book criticized the "forced rhyming text" and "uneven" rhymes which the "festive watercolors" helped to compensate.
