= Frank Asch =

American children's author (1946–2022)

- Born: August 6, 1946; Somerville, New Jersey, US
- Died: August 7, 2022 (aged 76); Kapaʻau, Hawaii, US
- Occupations: Artist, illustrator, writer
- Spouse: Jan Asch
- Children: 1, Devin Asch
- Writing career
- Period: 1968–2022
- Genre: Children's literature
- Website: frankaschbooks.com

Frank Asch (August 6, 1946–August 7, 2022) was an American children's book writer, best known for his Moonbear picture books.

== Early life and education ==
Asch was born on August 6, 1946 in Somerville, New Jersey, the son of John and Margaret (née Giasullo) Asch. He had two siblings who were 7 and 10 years older, respectively. In the 1960s, Asch attended Rutgers University and the Pratt Institute before earning a Bachelor of Fine Arts from Cooper Union in 1969.

== Career ==
Asch published his first picture book, George's Store, in 1968. He wrote over 60 books, including Turtle Tale, Mooncake, I Can Blink, and Happy Birthday Moon. In 1989, he wrote Here Comes the Cat!, in collaboration with Vladimir Vagin. The book was awarded the Russian National Book Award, and was considered the first Russian-American collaboration on a children's book. In 2004, Mr. Maxwell's Mouse received the Cuffie award for Most Unusual Book of the Year.

Beyond writing, Asch taught at a public grammar school in India in 1972, then back to the United States, teaching at a Montessori school in Edison, New Jersey in 1975. Through the 1970s, he conducted numerous creative workshops for children, including performing and producing a children's theater troupe with his wife, Jan. During this time, he also became an artist-in-residence at the New England Center for Contemporary Art in Brooklyn, Connecticut.

== Personal life and death ==
Asch lived in Somerville, New Jersey and Middletown Springs, Vermont. Before his death on August 7, 2022, Asch lived in Kapaʻau, Hawaiʻi with his wife, Jan, with whom he had one child, Devin.

== Publications ==
- George's Store, McGraw-Hill (New York, NY), 1968.
- Linda, McGraw-Hill (New York, NY), 1969.
- Elvira Everything, Harper (New York, NY), 1970.
- The Blue Balloon, McGraw-Hill (New York, NY), 1971.
- Yellow, Yellow, illustrated by Mark Alan Stamaty, McGraw-Hill (New York, NY), 1971.
- I Met a Penguin: A Love Story, McGraw-Hill (New York, NY), 1972.
- Rebecka, Harper (New York, NY), 1972.
- In the Eye of the Teddy, Harper (New York, NY), 1973.
- Gia and the One Hundred Dollars Worth of Bubble Gum, McGraw-Hill (New York, NY), 1974.
- Good Lemonade, illustrated by Marie Zimmerman, F. Watts (New York, NY), 1976.
- Monkey Face, Parents' Magazine Press (New York, NY), 1977.
- City Sandwich, Greenwillow (New York, NY), 1978.
- MacGoose's Grocery, illustrated by James Marshall, Dial (New York, NY), 1978.
- Moonbear, Scribner (New York, NY), 1978.
- Sand Cake, Parents' Magazine Press (New York, NY), 1978.
- Turtle Tale, Dial (New York, NY), 1978.
- Country Pie, Greenwillow (New York, NY), 1979.
- Little Devil's A, B, C, Scribner (New York, NY), 1979.
- Little Devil's 1, 2, 3, Scribner (New York, NY), 1979.
- Popcorn, Parents' Magazine Press (New York, NY), 1979.
- Running with Rachel, photographs by Jan Asch and Robert Michael Buslow, Dial (New York, NY), 1979.
- The Last Puppy, Prentice-Hall (Englewood Cliffs, NJ), 1980.
- Starbaby, Scribner (New York, NY), 1980.
- Goodnight Horsey, Prentice-Hall (Englewood Cliffs, NJ), 1981.
- Just like Daddy, Prentice-Hall (Englewood Cliffs, NJ), 1981.
- Bread and Honey, Parents' Magazine Press (New York, NY), 1982.
- Happy Birthday, Moon!, Prentice-Hall (Englewood Cliffs, NJ), 1982.
- Milk and Cookies, Parents' Magazine Press (New York, NY), 1982.
- Moon Cake, Prentice-Hall (Englewood Cliffs, NJ), 1983.
- Moongame, Prentice-Hall (Englewood Cliffs, NJ), 1984.
- Pearl's Promise, Delacorte (New York, NY), 1984.
- Skyfire, Prentice-Hall (Englewood Cliffs, NJ), 1984.
- Bear's Shadow, Prentice-Hall (Englewood Cliffs, NJ), 1985.
- Bear's Bargain, Prentice-Hall (Englewood Cliffs, NJ), 1985.
- I Can Blink, Kids Can Press (Tonawanda, NY), 1985.
- I Can Roar, Kids Can Press (Tonawanda, NY), 1985.
- Goodbye House, Prentice-Hall (Englewood Cliffs, NJ), 1986.
- Pearl's Pirates, Delacorte (New York, NY), 1987.
- Oats and Wild Apples, Holiday House (New York, NY), 1988.
- Here Comes the Cat!, illustrated by Asch and Vladimir Vagin, Scholastic (New York, NY), 1989.
- Journey to Terezor, Holiday House (New York, NY), 1989.
- Baby in the Box, Holiday House (New York, NY), 1989.
- The Alphabet Zoo, illustrated by Lee Lee Brazeal, Scott Foresman (Glenview, IL), 1989.
- Flags of the United Nations Sticker Book, Scholastic (New York, NY), 1990.
- Dear Brother (with Vladimir Vagin), Scholastic (New York, NY), 1991.
- Short Train, Long Train, Scholastic (New York, NY), 1992.
- Little Fish, Big Fish, Scholastic (New York, NY), 1992.
- The Flower Faerie (with Vladimir Vagin), Scholastic (New York, NY), 1993.
- Moonbear's Canoe, Simon & Schuster (New York, NY), 1993.
- Moonbear's Friend, Simon & Schuster (New York, NY), 1993.
- Moonbear's Books, Simon & Schuster (New York, NY), 1993.
- Moondance, Scholastic (New York, NY), 1993.
- The Earth and I, Gulliver Books (San Diego, CA), 1994.
- Hands around Lincoln School, Scholastic (New York, NY), 1994.
- Insects from Outer Space, illustrated by Vladimir Vagin, Scholastic (New York, NY), 1994.
- Water, Harcourt (San Diego, CA), 1995.
- Up River, photography by Ted Levin and Steve Lehmer), Simon & Schuster (New York, NY), 1995.
- Sawgrass Poems: A View of the Everglades, photography by Ted Levin, Harcourt (San Diego, CA), 1996.
- Moonbear's Pet, Simon & Schuster (New York, NY), 1997.
- Moon Dream, Harcourt (San Diego, CA), 1998.
- Cactus Poems, Harcourt (San Diego, CA), 1998.
- Barnyard Lullaby, Simon & Schuster (New York, NY), 1998.
- Ziggy Piggy and the Three Little Pigs, Kids Can Press (Tonawanda, NY), 1998.
- Good Night, Baby Bear, Harcourt (San Diego, CA), 1998.
- Moonbear's Dream, Simon & Schuster (New York, NY), 1999.
- Baby Bird's First Nest, Harcourt (San Diego, CA), 1999.
- Song of the North, photographs by Ted Levin, Harcourt (San Diego, CA), 1999.
- The Sun Is My Favorite Star, Harcourt (San Diego, CA), 2000.
- Baby Duck's New Friend (with Devin Asch), Harcourt (San Diego, CA), 2001.
- Like a Windy Day (with Devin Asch), Harcourt (San Diego, CA), 2002.
- The Ghost of P.S. 42 ("Class Pets" series), illustrated by John Kanzler, Simon & Schuster (New York, NY), 2002.
- Battle in a Bottle ("Class Pets" series), illustrated by John Kanzler, Simon & Schuster (New York, NY), 2003.
- Survival School ("Class Pets" series), illustrated by John Kanzler, Simon & Schuster (New York, NY), 2003.
- Monsieur Saguette and His Baguette, Kids Can Press (Toronto, Ontario, Canada), 2004.
- Mr. Maxwell's Mouse (with Devin Asch), Kids Can Press (Toronto, Ontario, Canada), 2004.
- Star Jumper: Journal of a Cardboard Genius, Kids Can Press (Toronto, Ontario, Canada), 2006.
- Mrs. Marlowe’s Mice, Kids Can Press (Toronto, Ontario, Canada), 2007.
- The Daily Comet: Boy Saves Earth from Giant Octopus, Kids Can Press (Toronto, Ontario, Canada), 2010.
- Happy Birthday, Big Bad Wolf, Kids Can Press (Toronto, Ontario, Canada), 2011.
- I Can Roar, Kids Can Press (Toronto, Ontario, Canada), 2015.
- Pizza, Aladdin, 2015.
- The Lending Zoo, Simon & Schuster (New York, NY), 2016.
- Pancakes in Pajamas, Aladdin, 2018.
- Tacos, Aladdin, 2023.
