= Bethany Roberts =

American children's author (born 1949)

- Born: September 6, 1949 (age 75); Wallingford, Connecticut
- Other names: Barbara Snow Beverage
- Occupation: Children's author
- Years active: 1984–2009
- Notable work: Waiting-for-Spring Stories (1984); Waiting-for-Christmas Stories (1994); Gramps and the Fire Dragon (2000); Birthday Mice! (2002); Fourth of July Mice! (2004)
- Spouse: Robert Beverage
- Children: 2 daughters

Barbara Snow Beverage, who uses the pen name Bethany Roberts, (born September 6, 1949) is an American children's author, known for her series of picture books informally marketed as Holiday Mice.

== Personal life and education ==
Roberts was born in Wallingford, Connecticut. She aspired to become a writer from the age of six, and wrote her first stories at age eight; she was also a "neighborhood storyteller" and "a bit of a[n outdoors] tomboy" while growing up.

Roberts graduated from Lyman Hall High School, then attended Bates College and received a degree in early childhood education from Southern Connecticut State University.

She is married to Robert Beverage and has two daughters: Krista and Melissa. In 1994, she lived in Hamden, Connecticut.

== Career ==
"I write about things I like, things that are important to me—warm cozy families, friendships, seasons and holidays, furry little animals. There isn't much that I like better than writing."

— Bethany Roberts, as quoted from her website

Roberts was a teacher and children's librarian before her writing career began. She taught children's literature at the Naugatuck Valley Community College in Waterbury.

Her first book, Waiting-for-Spring Stories, came out in 1984. From the mid-1990s to mid-2000s, she and illustrator Doug Cushman collaborated on the informally named Holiday Mice picture-book series, which featured the title family of four—two children plus their mother and father.

As an animal lover, Roberts has included animal characters in many of her works, stating that they were "multicultural", highly relatable, and flexible in their use. "Many of [her] story ideas," according to Gale's Something About the Author, "are generated from words that 'sound right' together, while others are inspired by her own experiences or by research."

== Accolades ==
In 2001, Roberts' Gramps and the Fire Dragon was honored as a Children's Choice selection by the International Reading Association and Children's Book Council.

== Bibliography ==
=== Waiting-for series ===
- Waiting-for-Spring Stories, illustrated by William Joyce (1984, Harper & Row)
- Waiting-for-Papa Stories, illustrated by Sarah Stapler (1990, Harper & Row)
- Waiting-for-Christmas Stories, illustrated by Sarah Stapler (1994, Clarion)

=== Holiday Mice series ===
The Holiday Mice books are illustrated by Doug Cushman and published by Clarion.

- Halloween Mice! (1995)
- Valentine Mice! (1997)
- Christmas Mice! (2000)
- Thanksgiving Mice! (2001)
- Birthday Mice! (2002)
- Easter Mice! (2003)
- Fourth of July Mice! (2004)

=== Standalone books ===
- The Two O'Clock Secret, illustrated by Robin Kramer (1992, Albert Whitman)
- Camel Caravan, co-written with Patricia Hubbell, illustrated by Cheryl Munro Taylor (1996, Tambourine)
- Cat Parade, illustrated by Diane Greenseid (1996, Clarion)
- Eleven Elephants Going Up!, co-written with Patricia Hubbell, illustrated by Minh Uong (1996, Whispering Coyote Press)
- Monster Manners, illustrated by Andrew Glass (1996, Clarion)
- A Mouse Told His Mother, illustrated by Maryjane Begin (1997, Little, Brown)
- Follow Me!, illustrated by Diane Greenseid (1998, Clarion)
- Gramps and the Fire Dragon, illustrated by Melissa Iwai (2000, Clarion) (Note: Something About the Author lists a 1997 date predating the official publication.)
- The Wind's Garden, illustrated by Melanie Hope Greenberg (2001, Henry Holt)
- May Belle and the Ogre, illustrated by Marsha Winborn (2003, Dutton)
- Rosie to the Rescue, illustrated by Kay Chorao (2003, Henry Holt)
- Cat Skidoo, illustrated by R.W. Alley (2004, Henry Holt)
- Ogre Eats Everything, illustrated by Marsha Winborn (2005, Dutton)
- Cookie Angel, illustrated by Vladimir Vagin (2007, Henry Holt)
- Double Trouble Groundhog Day, illustrated by Lorinda Bryan Cauley (2008, Henry Holt)
