= Doug Cushman =

American illustrator and cartoonist

Doug Cushman (born May 4, 1953) is an artist who has worked as a cartoonist and a book illustrator. He is also the author of a series of children's books.

== Life and career ==
Doug Cushman was born in Springfield, Ohio, and moved to Connecticut with his family when he was 13 years old. While in high school he created comic books lampooning his teachers, selling them to his classmates for a nickel a piece. Cushman has illustrated and written over 120 books for children over his career since 1978. In his free time, Cushman enjoys painting, playing guitar, and cooking along with traveling the world. He spends most of his time in Paris, France, Europe, and the US.

== Awards and honors ==
=== Awards ===
- He received the National Cartoonist Society Magazine and Book Illustration Award for 1996
- He was nominated the National Cartoonist Society Magazine and Book Illustration Award in 2000.

=== Honors ===
- Reuben Award for Book Illustration from the Nationalist Cartoonists Society
- New York Times Children's Books Best Sellers
- New York Public Library's Best 100 Books of 2000
- 2009 California Young Readers medal

== Selected works ==
=== Self-illustrated ===
==== Mouse and Mole ====
- Mouse and Mole (1989; Grosset & Dunlap)
- Mouse and Mole and the Year-Round Garden (1994; Scientific American Books for Young Readers)
- Mouse and Mole and the Christmas Walk (1994; Scientific American Books for Young Readers)
- Mouse and Mole and the All-Weather Train Ride (1995; Scientific American Books for Young Readers)

==== Aunt Eater ====
- Aunt Eater Loves a Mystery (1987; Harper & Row)
- Aunt Eater's Mystery Vacation (1992; HarperCollins)
- Aunt Eater's Mystery Christmas (1995; HarperCollins)
- Aunt Eater's Mystery Halloween (1998; HarperCollins)

==== Other books ====
- Giants (1980; compiler; Platt & Munk)
- Inspector Hopper (2000; HarperCollins)
- Inspector Hopper's Mystery Year (2003; HarperCollins)

=== By other writers ===
==== Bicycle Bear ====
(Michaela Muntean; Parents Magazine Press)

- Bicycle Bear (1983)
- Bicycle Bear Rides Again (1989)

==== Holiday Mice! ====
(Bethany Roberts; Clarion)

- Halloween Mice! (1995)
- Valentine Mice! (1997)
- Christmas Mice! (2000)
- Thanksgiving Mice! (2001)
- Birthday Mice! (2002)
- Easter Mice! (2003)
- Fourth of July Mice! (2004)

==== What People Can't Do ====
(Douglas Wood; Simon & Schuster)

- What Dads Can't Do (2000)
- What Moms Can't Do (2001)
- What Teachers Can't Do (2002)
- What Santa Can't Do (2003)
- What Grandmas Can't Do (2005)

==== Gus the Hedgehog ====
(Jacklyn Williams; Picture Window Books)

- Happy Easter, Gus! (2005)
- Happy Halloween, Gus! (2005)
- Happy Valentine's Day, Gus! (2005)
- Merry Christmas, Gus! (2005)
- Happy Thanksgiving, Gus! (2006)
- Happy Birthday, Gus! (2006)
- Welcome to Third Grade, Gus! (2006)
- Let's Go Fishing, Gus! (2007)
- Make a New Friend, Gus! (2007)
- Pick a Pet, Gus! (2007)

==== Standalone titles ====
===== With Jack Long =====
(Published by Checkerboard, 1987)

- The Secret of the Nile
- The Sunken Treasure
- The Vanishing Professor

===== Other works =====
- Not Counting Monsters (1978; by H.L. Ross; Platt & Munk)
- Haunted Houses on Halloween (1979; by Lillie Patterson; Platt & Munk)
- Chatty Chipmunk's Nutty Day (1985; by Suzanne Gruber; Troll Communications)
- Aunt Morbella and the Screaming Skulls (1992; by Joan Davenport Carris; Little, Brown)
- Frogs (1996; by Robin Dexter; Troll Communications)
- Little Raccoon (2001; by Lillian Moore; Henry Holt)
- ABC: Alphabet Rhymes (2004; by Matt Mitter; Gareth Stevens)
- ¡Marimba!: Animales from A to Z (2006; by Pat Mora; Clarion)
- Birthday at the Panda Palace (2007; by Stephanie Calmenson; HarperCollins)
- Ella, Of Course! (2007; by Sarah Weeks; Harcourt)
