= Joey Pigza Loses Control =

Book by Jack Gantos

- Dust jacket of the hard-cover edition showing the Newbery Medallion
- Author: Jack Gantos
- Language: English
- Publication date: 2000
- Publication place: United States
- Media type: Print
- Pages: 220 pp
- Preceded by: Joey Pigza Swallowed The Key
- Followed by: What Would Joey Do?

Joey Pigza Loses Control is a Newbery Honor book by Jack Gantos and is the sequel to Joey Pigza Swallowed the Key. This realistic fiction book was published in the year 2000 and describes the challenging life of young Joey who had attention deficit disorder.

== Plot ==
Joey Pigza Loses Control is the story of a young boy with the widely known Attention Deficit hyperactivity disorder. (ADHD) The fiction book begins with Joey and his mother and dog's road trip traveling to his father's home where he is eager and nervous for what the next six weeks with his Dad, will have in store for him. After not seeing his father for many years, Joey's questions regarding his concerns towards his father, become endless. This array of questions in the form of “What If’s” that Joey bases his questions on, allows readers a full on experience into the mind of a young boy with ADHD. Joey's mother, who is clearly highly impacted by her son's disorder answers Joey's questions vaguely and occasionally, portraying a sense of impatience and relief about Joey's upcoming six week stay with his father. During the road trip, Joey wonders about all kinds of things revolving around what to expect from his dad. He was extremely impatient and nervous but one thing was for sure, it was comforting to know that his mother's own worries about Joey's father were consuming her thoughts so profoundly, it no longer seemed like Joey and his condition were the only thing on her mind, something that he had become quite accustomed to.

Now finding a suitable medicine in the form of an arm patch for Joey's ADHD, Joey was able to "settle down and think." And not just think about all the bad things that had already happened. He started thinking about the good things he wanted to happen. Joey's life takes a major turn when he finally meets his father and feels a sense of familiarity with himself, before the meds, before being placed in the special education classes, his old hyperactive self. Carter, Joey's father, makes it the summers duty to make up for the time he was absent in his son's life. Carter teaches Joey the importance of taking control over his own life, and how to be a true winner. Carter Pigza takes the first step in helping his son take control, by flushing down Joey's ADHD medication down the toilet. As nervous and hesitant as Joey was to “take control” over his own life, Joey followed his father's guidance willingly. The conflict between Joey's approach at taking control over his life, and trying to please his father is what this novel is based upon. Joey becomes increasingly fearful that things will go wrong like they did in the past, and although just a young boy, his father makes dangerous decisions. Joey slowly but surely loses control over his behavior and feelings without his medication arm patch, and finds his voice throughout the novel.

== Characters ==
- Joey Pigza: The main character of this fiction story. A young boy with Attention Deficit Disorder
- Carter Pigza: Joey's father, with whom Joey spends six weeks of his summer.
- Fran Pigza: Joey Pigza's impatient but loving mother.
- Granny Pigza: Carter's mother and Joey's grandmother
- Leezy: Carter's girlfriend whom Joey meets for the first time during his stay with his father.
- Pablo Pigza: Joey's delicate Chihuahua, who he considers to be his best friend.

== Awards ==
- Newbery Medal Honor Book
- ALA Notable Book
- Publishers Weekly Best Book
- School Library Journal Best Book
- NY Times Book Review Notable Book
- BCCB Blue Ribbon Book
- Booklist Editors' Choice
- Horn Book Fanfare Book
- Booklinks Lasting Choice Selection
