= List of Blue Murder episodes =

This is an episode list for the Canadian TV show Blue Murder. The show aired its pilot on January 10, 2001 and ended its four-year run on July 9, 2004.

The show centered on the fictitious Blue Murder Unit of the Toronto Police Department. Cases usually involved murders, kidnapping or other violent offenses.

The show has been broadcast in the UK on the Hallmark Channel.

== Series overview ==
Season	Episodes	Originally released	
Season	Episodes	First released	Last released
1	13	January 10, 2001	April 2, 2001
2	13	October 12, 2001	January 30, 2002
3	13	January 17, 2003	April 25, 2003
4	13	April 21, 2004	July 9, 2004

== Episodes ==
=== Season 1 (2001) ===
No. overall	No. in season	Title	Directed by	Written by	Original release date	Prod. code
1	1	"Heroes (Part 1)"	Stephen Williams	Steve Lucas & Cal Coons	January 10, 2001	102
An alliance between a detective and a criminal creates deadly consequences.
2	2	"Heroes (Part 2)"	Stephen Williams	Steve Lucas & Cal Coons	January 10, 2001	103
The investigation of a police officer's murder shows he is allied with a notorious criminal.
3	3	"Black Sheep"	T.W. Peacocke	Cal Coons	January 17, 2001	104
After a second young mother is found sexually assaulted and murdered in her own home, the squad begins trying to link the crimes together. Unfortunately, everything seems to lead to one of their own. Castillo comes close to compromising the investigation because she has trouble dealing with the sexual assaults, and Pogue, despite his initial misgivings, enlists the help of the police techie to hunt down a viable suspect.
4	4	"Little India"	T.W. Peacocke	Sugith Varughese	January 24, 2001	106
A shooting at a dance club leads to fears a young Indo-Canadian woman has been kidnapped by her boyfriend.
5	5	"Summer Of Love"	Stephen Williams	Steve Lucas & Jill Golick	January 31, 2001	101
After the skeleton of a young man is found in an old apartment house, Pogue initially suspects that the man may have been killed in the Rochdale College riots, but a composite recreation leads detectives to a 25-year-old missing person, Liam Morrison, who has not been seen since late August 1974. While investigating the murder, they learn that Liam was an informant for Pat Berlinger, a legend in the police department. Further investigations lead them to the discovery that Barrow was partnered with Berlinger on the night that Morrison disappeared.
6	6	"Steel Drums"	John L'Ecuyer	Cal Coons	February 7, 2001	112
Bodies of women are found in a warehouse.
7	7	"Partners"	Tim Southam	Therese Beaupre	February 14, 2001	108
Mistaken identity is the probable cause of a drive-by shooting.
8	8	"All Saints"	Larry McLean	Steve Lucas	February 28, 2001	105
When teenager Andy Kralic is found dead on the subway tracks, officers initially assume that he was murdered before surveillance videos show that Kralic walked in front of the tracks himself. Barrow is put in a hard place by Dr. Gordon Stiles, from the coroner's office, who is looking to do an inquest into recent deaths and wants answers about Kralic's suicide. Pogue and Oosterhuis question Andy's friends, Patrick Lee and Linda Ferrero, about Andy's life and school and learn that he had recently gotten in trouble at school for an article the three of them had never intended to put in the paper. Castillo, Pogue and Oosterhuis all disagree on Andy's death, with Castillo convinced someone else is to blame, Oosterhuis convinced that something drove him to it, and Pogue convinced that sometimes there is no reason.
9	9	"Dr. Tara"	T.W. Peacocke	Cal Coons & Jill Golick	March 7, 2001	109
The Russian Mafia is suspected of a celebrity's shooting.
10	10	"Intensive Care"	T.W. Peacocke	Sugith Varughese	March 12, 2001	113
The officers discover that mysterious deaths at a hospital may be somehow linked with unsolved deaths. Castillo goes undercover at the hospital to investigate their prime suspect, a beautiful and compassionate doctor, but the more Castillo gets to know her, the less she wants to find Christina guilty of murder. In a final attempt to bring the killer out of the shadows, Tarver goes undercover as a patient in the hospital, with Pogue and Oosterhuis watching on video.
11	11	"Remington Park"	John L'Ecuyer	Story by : Cal Coons; Teleplay by : David Sutherland	March 19, 2001	107
A racial killing is suspected when a black civilian is shot.
12	12	"Remembrance Day (Part 1)"	Stephen Williams	Cal Coons & Jill Golick	March 26, 2001	110
Four abortion providers are killed and the killer's next target is posted on a website.
13	13	"Remembrance Day (Part 2)"	Stephen Williams	Cal Coons & Jill Golick	April 2, 2001	111
The investigators must find some link between an anti-abortionist group and the murders of abortion providers.

=== Season 2 (2001–02) ===
No. overall	No. in season	Title	Directed by	Written by	Original release date	Prod. code
14	1	"Baby Point"	T.W. Peacocke	Steve Lucas	October 12, 2001	201
The officers must investigate an assault on two women.
15	2	"Asylum"	Tim Southam	Michael Melski	October 19, 2001	202
A psychiatrist is found murdered at a criminally insane hospital.
16	3	"Inside Jobs"	T.W. Peacocke	Cal Coons	October 26, 2001	203
A failed bank heist brings low police morale to the surface.
17	4	"Family Man"	Don McBrearty	Jill Golick	November 2, 2001	204
After Linda Dewson is found dead in her home and her husband, Martin, severely injured from a head shot, detectives initially believe they're looking at a murder suicide until the doctors tell them that there is no way the wound was self-inflicted. While looking into the Dewsons' personal lives, detectives get a hint that, a few years ago, Martin Dewson was suspected of sexually molesting a teenage girl, and they begin to wonder if the crime originated closer to home and begin looking more closely at the Dewsons' three daughters -- 17-year-old Katherine, 15-year-old Jessica and 12-year-old Elani.
18	5	"Missing Persons"	Scott Summersgill	David Sutherland	November 9, 2001	205
The police investigate a crime-suspected adoption company.
19	6	"Homeless"	Peter Wellington	Cal Coons	November 16, 2001	206
The homeless living on the streets are the target of a murderer.
20	7	"Collateral Damage"	T.W. Peacocke	David Barlow	November 30, 2001	207
Metro squad finds themselves on the opposite side of the police when they investigate the deaths of Bruno Deckert, a member of local biker gang the Desperadoes, and Bobby O'Driscoll, a hired gun for the Farentino family. Pogue and Oosterhuis focus on O'Driscoll's death, with Sweet and Castillo focusing on Deckert's death. They soon realise that there is a war brewing between the two rivalries despite claims that they're joining forces, and before long Pogue and Oosterhuis realise that someone in the Farentino clan had very good reason to want Bobby dead, and Sweet and Castillo continue to meet opposition from their police contact until Keller finally turns over the video they need to make the connection.
21	8	"Death And Taxes"	Scott Summersgill	Story by : Michael Melski; Teleplay by : Jill Golick	December 7, 2001	208
Four accountants are murdered, and the investigation leads to a maze of possible murderers.
22	9	"Wrongful Convictions"	T.W. Peacocke	Steve Lucas	December 14, 2001	209
Oosterhuis finds himself embroiled in the midst of a murder case when both he and his former partner come under suspicion.
23	10	"Spankdaddy"	Don McBrearty	Cal Coons	January 9, 2002	210
The team is given 36 hours to track down the kidnappers of 11-year-old Grace Langley before she is raped. After footage of the missing girl is posted on the Internet via a web cam, Castillo pairs up with the Internet-savvy Jim Weeks, and Pogue and Oosterhuis question convicted child molester Larry Harwell. Sweet is in charge of questioning the family and friends of the victim, and one has an unusually strong reaction. Harwell turns the team onto a pedophile with the handle 'Spankdaddy', leaving Castillo and Weeks trying to find the man to match the handle.
24	11	"Payback"	Cal Coons	Rebecca Schechter	January 16, 2002	211
Sweet and Castillo investigate the racially motivated package bombs that kill Carlotta Alcantara and Martin Simpson, and find themselves dealing with a suspect who ignores Sweet because he's black and is equally dismissive of the Hispanic Castillo. It isn't long before they realize Carl Purdy's motive is connected to his ex-wife's new Cuban husband. Pogue and Oosterhuis investigate the death of political intern Tammy Moore, who was found hanged and dressed in bondage gear by an underpass. Their investigation leads them to the Club de Sade, whose owner sends them right back to the lawyer who had sworn Tammy was too freaky for him.
25	12	"Out Of Towners (Part 1)"	John L'Ecuyer	David Barlow	January 23, 2002	212
A raped woman is found in an abandoned building, and the pattern looks like a crime that Castillo once failed to solve.
26	13	"Out Of Towners (Part 2)"	John L'Ecuyer	Jill Golick	January 30, 2002	213
After the serial rapist is found murdered and evidence shows he was killed by a woman, Castillo and the rape victims are prime suspects.

=== Season 3 (2003) ===
No. overall	No. in season	Title	Directed by	Written by	Original release date	Prod. code
27	1	"America's Most Wanted"	Scott Summersgill	Graham Clegg	January 17, 2003	301
An American bounty hunter seeks the suspects in a shoot-out that leaves an officer paralyzed.
28	2	"Search Party"	T.W. Peacocke	Jill Golick, Catherine Cooper	January 24, 2003	302
When a young girl is kidnapped in front of a local store, her sister is the only witness.
29	3	"Respect"	T.W. Peacocke	David Barlow	January 31, 2003	303
A body is found by the tracks.
30	4	"John Doe"	Steve DiMarco	Jill Golick	February 7, 2003	304
A man is found, beaten and amnesiac, with only a book of bird drawings to help identify him.
31	5	"Ladykillers"	T.W. Peacocke	Steve Lucas	February 21, 2003	305
Deputy Chief Barrow's business card is found on the body of a male escort.
32	6	"Full Disclosure"	Steve DiMarcho	David Barlow	February 28, 2003	306
Reopening a fourteen-year-old murder case.
33	7	"Love and Marriage"	T.W. Peacocke	Jill Golick	March 7, 2003	307
A woman is found dead in her husband's car.
34	8	"Speed Demons"	T.W. Peacocke	Pete White	March 14, 2003	308
A woman is killed by drag racers.
35	9	"Boy Band"	Scott Summersgill	Rebecca Schechter	March 21, 2003	309
A member of a pop group appears to have committed suicide by jumping from their penthouse suite.
36	10	"Ambush"	T.W. Peacocke	Cal Coons	March 28, 2003	310
Two police officers are murdered.
37	11	"Hard Time"	Steve DiMarco	Steve Lucas	April 11, 2003	311
Pogue and Oosterhuis are investigated when a suspect dies in custody.
38	12	"Necklace"	Steve DiMarco	Cal Coons	April 18, 2003	312
A diamond courier is murdered by "necklacing".
39	13	"Lover's Lane"	Cal Coons	Cal Coons	April 25, 2003	313
A beheaded body is found in an abandoned van.

=== Season 4 (2004) ===
No. overall	No. in season	Title	Directed by	Written by	Original release date	Prod. code
40	1	"Blind Eye"	T.W. Peacocke	Karen Hill	April 21, 2004	401
A Filipina nanny is murdered.
41	2	"Special Delivery"	Steve DiMarco	Cal Coons	April 28, 2004	402
The owner of a construction company goes missing.
42	3	"Boys' Club"	T.W. Peacocke	Steve Lucas	May 5, 2004	403
When a police officer is murdered, his partner is one of the suspects.
43	4	"Janet Green"	T.W. Peacocke	Jill Golick	May 12, 2004	404
Two women with the same name are murdered within days of one another.
44	5	"Boarders"	Scott Summersgill	Jill Golick	May 19, 2004	405
A student is murdered at a private school.
45	6	"Midnight Man"	Steve DiMarco	David Barlow	May 26, 2004	406
The ex-wife of a novelist is found murdered in an apparent burglary.
46	7	"Eyewitness"	T.W. Peacocke	Cal Coons	June 2, 2004	407
A psychic claims to have seen a murder.
47	8	"Upstairs Downstairs"	Scott Summersgill	David Barlow	June 9, 2004	408
When a young woman is murdered, the cook and her brother believe Weeks is harder on them because they are black.
48	9	"Home Invasion"	Scott Summersgill	David Cole	June 16, 2004	409
An apparent home invasion leads to a former police officer who may be involved in a drug scheme.
40	10	"Cell Block 13"	T.W. Peacocke	Steve Lucas	June 18, 2004	411
An actor is found murdered in his trailer.
50	11	"Spooks"	Cal Coons	Cal Coons	June 25, 2004	410
When a math professor is murdered, Oosterhuis is warned off the case by his old partner from Homicide.
51	12	"Party Line"	T.W. Peacocke	Karen Hill	July 2, 2004	412
A provincial cabinet minister is found murdered.
52	13	"Family Reunion"	T.W. Peacocke	Jill Golick	July 9, 2004	413
The mummified remains of an infant are found inside a tree.
