= I Am Not Joey Pigza =

2007 book by Jack Gantos

- Author: Jack Gantos
- Language: English
- Genre: Children's
- Publisher: Farrar, Straus and Giroux
- Publication date: 2007
- Publication place: United States
- Media type: Print
- Pages: 224 pp
- ISBN: 9780374399412
- Preceded by: What Would Joey Do?
- Followed by: The Key That Swallowed Joey Pigza

I Am Not Joey Pigza is a 2007 children's novel by Jack Gantos. It is the fourth book of a series featuring the character Joey Pigza, a boy with attention deficit hyperactivity disorder.

== Plot ==
Things have settled down for Joey Pigza since the events of the last book until his unpredictable father, Carter, returns once again. This time, he's changed his name to Charles Heinz, and claims to have turned over a new leaf after winning the lottery. To Joey's surprise, his mother, Fran, takes him back, becomes Maria Heinz, and changes Joey's name to Freddie.

Joey's father concocts an ill-conceived plan to purchase and renovate a roadside diner, and Joey is forced to leave school to move and work there. Between the new name, new home, and new job, Joey begins to suffer an identity crisis.

His immature parents prove to be of no help. His father is completely convinced that the failing Beehive Diner was a good decision, and his mother is too distracted by shopping to notice otherwise. When Joey speaks up, she simply tells him to forgive his father for his past mistakes and follow along with the plan.

Joey struggles with this, but eventually learns to forgive his dad and accept him for who he is. Meanwhile, unfortunately, Joey's father abandons his plan, and spends his remaining winnings trying unsuccessfully to recoup his losses with more lottery tickets. Furthermore, Joey's mother is pregnant again.

Predictably, Carter Pigza once again abandons his family when they need him most. Joey, however, doesn't regret or rescind his forgiveness. Instead, he comes to realize that you can't change who people are, not even yourself. He resolves to forgive and looks to the future, optimistic about his new baby brother.

== Characters ==
Joey Pigza (a.k.a. "Freddie Heinz") - The protagonist, a young boy with ADHD.

Carter Pigza (a.k.a. "Charles Heinz") - Joey's father, who has been in-and-out of Joey's life. When he does show up, his irresponsible decisions often lead to chaos for Joey, his family, and others. Carter also has ADHD, but does nothing to manage it.

Fran Pigza (a.k.a. "Maria Heinz") - Joey's mother, who is loving but naive. Blinded by the prospect of riches, she quickly falls for Carter's apology and ignores Joey when he expresses his doubts. At the end of the novel, she is pregnant with Joey's little brother.

== Reception ==
The book was named one of 2007's best books by the School Library Journal.

“Stands well on its own, though anyone new to Joey's saga will want to read more. This is Gantos at his best, and that's saying a lot.”―Kirkus Reviews, starred review

“Another wild ride--over serious terrain.” ―Publishers Weekly, starred review

“Gantos is wise and subtle in his exploration of his hero's identity dilemma.” ―The Bulletin of the Center for Children's Books
