= What Would Joey Do? =

Book by Jack Gantos

- First edition
- Author: Jack Gantos
- Language: English
- Publication date: 2003
- Publication place: United States
- Media type: Print (hardback & paperback)
- Preceded by: Joey Pigza Loses Control
- Followed by: I Am Not Joey Pigza

What Would Joey Do? is a 2003 novel in a series by American author Jack Gantos about the character Joey Pigza. The title is a play on the Christian phrase "What would Jesus do?", which Mrs. Lapp, Joey's homeschooling tutor, asks him at her doorstep on every visit. The phrase is also a mirror to Joey's own trouble-filled life, as to which choice would be the best for "mopping up the messy corners of his life."

The audiobook is narrated by the author.

== Plot summary ==
The book deals with Joey as he tries to take charge of correcting his wrongs in his life and the lives of the people he knows, before finally learning that his priority should be doing what's best for himself and leaving the others to their own ways.

Joey’s father, Carter Pigza, who also has ADHD, rides his motorcycle recklessly through the neighborhood. After being shouted at by Joey's mother, Fran, Carter crashes his motorcycle into a tree and is injured by a branch. Carter is admitted into hospital, but later disappears.

Fran has Joey homeschooled by her friend, Mrs. Lapp, alongside Olivia, Mrs. Lapp's sullen, bratty, blind daughter. Carter continues to harass the family, resulting in Fran filing a restraining order. Meanwhile, Fran begins to see a new boyfriend, Booth, much to Joey’s chagrin.

Concerned by Joey’s lack of friends, Joey’s grandmother persuades Joey to befriend Olivia. Olivia, desperate to return to boarding school, repeatedly attempts to convince Joey to run away and sabotages his relationship with Mrs. Lapp in hopes of being sent back.

Joey's grandmother declares that she will die if Joey cannot bring Olivia to meet her and confirm their friendship. Meanwhile, Olivia’s favorite musical, Godspell, comes to town. Mrs. Lapp, disapproving of the show’s portrayal of religion, forbids Olivia from seeing it. Joey and Olivia strike a deal: If Olivia will attest to their friendship for Joey’s grandmother, he will find a way for her to see the show. Olivia agrees, and the two go to see his grandmother.

As they talk, Olivia attributes her blindness to her mother being bitten by a snake while she was pregnant. Mrs. Lapp, deeply religious, perceives the snake as a manifestation of Satan. Because of this, Olivia believes that she is destined to misbehave. However, after Joey’s grandma shares her perspective and life story, Olivia confides to Joey that she felt they have a lot in common.

Sometime later, Carter, wanting a chance to talk with Joey and reconnect with Fran, steals Pablo, Joey's pet dog. As Carter is unsure exactly which Chihuahua is Joey's, he steals all of the Chihuahuas in town. Joey returns the dogs to their rightful owners before finally going to meet his father. One owner, however, adopted another dog to cope with the loss of their previous one, and the two dogs do not get along. Joey takes in the extra dog and renames her Pablita.

Joey advises Carter to be nice to Fran to improve their relationship. However, on Thanksgiving, Fran is enraged by the gifts Carter sent and the two have a heated argument in front of the house, ruining the party. Disgusted by their behavior, Mrs. Lapp returns home and Joey follows. After catching up with her, Mrs. Lapp coldly declares that his family already has enough problems to deal with and that she would prefer him to stop trying to help solve Olivia's problems. Furthermore, she informs Joey that he will no longer be welcome at her homeschool sessions.

Joey's grandmother dies the next day, and Booth breaks up with Fran. Realizing that his plans for the others have all gone awry, Joey decides to do as his grandmother told him to; care more about himself and leave everyone else to care about themselves. Joey arranges the remaining details of his grandmother's funeral and uses some of her savings to buy nice clothes and two tickets to Godspell.

At the funeral, Fran and Carter once again begin to argue, this time over the cheap wooden casket in which Joey's grandmother was laid. Joey lashes out, informing them that it was because his grandmother would be cremated. Frustrated, Joey departs the funeral. That evening, Joey requests Mrs. Lapp’s permission to take Olivia to the show. She agrees and apologizes for her anger on Thanksgiving, but maintains her decision regarding homeschooling. She informs Joey that Olivia will be attending a boarding school.

After the show, Olivia is elated, and her and Joey share their first kiss. Before departing, they promise each other to keep in touch.

Joey returns to school, where he feels he belongs. With his dad 'going in circles' and his mom 'up and down', Joey decides that it’s time he moves in his own direction; forward.
