= Frontenac, Kansas =

City in Crawford County, Kansas

- City
- Location within Crawford County and Kansas

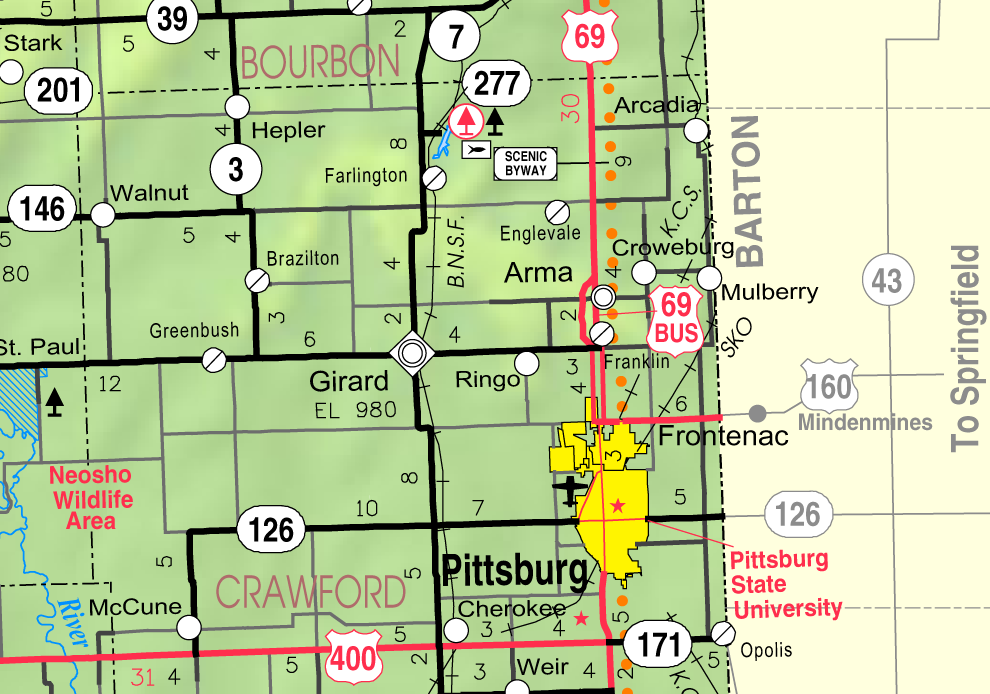
- KDOT map of Crawford County (legend)
- Coordinates: 37°27′30″N 94°42′05″W
- Country: United States
- State: Kansas
- County: Crawford
- Founded: 1886
- Incorporated: 1895

Area
  - Total: 5.32 sq mi (13.78 km^{2})
  - Land: 5.22 sq mi (13.53 km^{2})
  - Water: 0.097 sq mi (0.25 km^{2})
- Elevation: 935 ft (285 m)

Population (2020)
  - Total: 3,382
  - Density: 647.4/sq mi (250.0/km^{2})
- Time zone: UTC-6 (CST)
  - Summer (DST): UTC-5 (CDT)
- ZIP Code: 66763
- Area code: 620
- FIPS code: 20-24850
- GNIS ID: 485577
- Website: frontenacks.net

Frontenac is the second largest city in Crawford County, Kansas, United States. As of the 2020 census, the population of the city was 3,382.

== History ==
Frontenac was established as a coal mining town in 1886 in the Cherokee-Crawford Coal Fields in the western Ozark Plateau.

A post office was opened in Frontenac in 1887.

On the night of November 9, 1888, Frontenac suffered the worst mining disaster in Kansas history, when a coal dust explosion killed 44 miners.

During the last decade of the nineteenth century and in the early twentieth century the town was populated primarily by immigrant families from eastern and southeastern Europe, predominantly Sicilian, Italian, and Slavic people from the Austro-Hungarian Empire. Its maximum population neared 4,000. It housed various ethnic lodges and drinking parlors despite the state's increasingly severe ban on the distribution, sale, and manufacture of alcoholic beverages.

Coal mining remained the town's occupational base until World War II, when its economy began to change, as did the entire region's.

== Geography ==
Frontenac is located in the Cherokee Lowlands, at the western edge of the Ozarks. According to the United States Census Bureau, the city has a total area of 5.06 square miles (13.11 km^{2}), of which 4.97 square miles (12.87 km^{2}) is land and 0.09 square miles (0.23 km^{2}) is water.

=== Climate ===
The climate in this area is characterized by hot, humid summers and generally mild to cool winters. According to the Köppen Climate Classification system, Frontenac has a humid subtropical climate, abbreviated "Cfa" on climate maps.

== Demographics ==
Historical population
| Census | Pop. | Note | %± |
|---|---|---|---|
| 1890 | 600 | | — |
| 1900 | 1,805 | | 200.8% |
| 1910 | 3,396 | | 88.1% |
| 1920 | 3,225 | | −5.0% |
| 1930 | 2,085 | | −35.3% |
| 1940 | 1,766 | | −15.3% |
| 1950 | 1,569 | | −11.2% |
| 1960 | 1,713 | | 9.2% |
| 1970 | 2,223 | | 29.8% |
| 1980 | 2,586 | | 16.3% |
| 1990 | 2,588 | | 0.1% |
| 2000 | 2,996 | | 15.8% |
| 2010 | 3,437 | | 14.7% |
| 2020 | 3,382 | | −1.6% |
U.S. Decennial Census

=== 2020 census ===
As of the 2020 census, Frontenac had a population of 3,382, with 1,344 households and 872 families. The median age was 39.8 years. 23.9% of residents were under the age of 18, 8.4% were from 18 to 24, 24.3% were from 25 to 44, 22.6% were from 45 to 64, and 20.8% were 65 years of age or older. For every 100 females there were 92.5 males, and for every 100 females age 18 and over there were 89.6 males.

The population density was 647.3 inhabitants per square mile (249.9/km^{2}). There were 1,475 housing units at an average density of 282.3 per square mile (109.0/km^{2}), of which 8.9% were vacant. The homeowner vacancy rate was 2.1% and the rental vacancy rate was 7.3%.

Of the households, 30.6% had children under the age of 18 living in them, 47.2% were married-couple households, 17.0% were households with a male householder and no spouse or partner present, and 28.3% were households with a female householder and no spouse or partner present. About 29.6% of all households were made up of individuals, and 16.0% had someone living alone who was 65 years of age or older.

88.7% of residents lived in urban areas, while 11.3% lived in rural areas.

Racial composition as of the 2020 census
| Race | Number | Percent |
|---|---|---|
| White | 3,026 | 89.5% |
| Black or African American | 25 | 0.7% |
| American Indian and Alaska Native | 32 | 0.9% |
| Asian | 44 | 1.3% |
| Native Hawaiian and Other Pacific Islander | 31 | 0.9% |
| Some other race | 43 | 1.3% |
| Two or more races | 181 | 5.4% |
| Hispanic or Latino (of any race) | 132 | 3.9% |

Non-Hispanic White residents accounted for 88.14% of the population.

=== Demographic estimates ===
The average household size was 2.4 and the average family size was 2.7. The percent of those with a bachelor's degree or higher was estimated to be 23.5% of the population.

=== Income and poverty ===
The 2016–2020 5-year American Community Survey estimates show that the median household income was $51,563 (with a margin of error of +/- $7,113) and the median family income was $64,330 (+/- $7,897). Males had a median income of $34,672 (+/- $4,525) versus $36,141 (+/- $3,975) for females. The median income for those above 16 years old was $35,406 (+/- $3,171). Approximately, 3.9% of families and 7.1% of the population were below the poverty line, including 3.0% of those under the age of 18 and 10.5% of those ages 65 or over.

=== 2010 census ===
As of the census of 2010, there were 3,437 people, 1,391 households, and 893 families residing in the city. The population density was 691.5 inhabitants per square mile (267.0/km^{2}). There were 1,519 housing units at an average density of 305.6 per square mile (118.0/km^{2}). The racial makeup of the city was 95.5% White, 0.5% African American, 0.5% Native American, 0.7% Asian, 0.2% Pacific Islander, 0.6% from other races, and 1.9% from two or more races. Hispanic or Latino of any race were 2.1% of the population.

There were 1,391 households, of which 32.2% had children under the age of 18 living with them, 48.0% were married couples living together, 11.5% had a female householder with no husband present, 4.7% had a male householder with no wife present, and 35.8% were non-families. 30.6% of all households were made up of individuals, and 15.9% had someone living alone who was 65 years of age or older. The average household size was 2.40 and the average family size was 3.00.

The median age in the city was 40.1 years. 24.2% of residents were under the age of 18; 7.7% were between the ages of 18 and 24; 24.4% were from 25 to 44; 24.2% were from 45 to 64; and 19.6% were 65 years of age or older. The gender makeup of the city was 46.3% male and 53.7% female.

== Area events ==
Festa Italiana, A Taste of Nations is an annual festival held to celebrate the city's heritage. It hosts many different cooks, and patrons can sample foods from family recipes ranging from many different European heritages. Festa Italiana is held near the Frontenac Sports Complex each fall. Nearly 3,000 people attend Festa yearly.

Frontenac Town Homecoming is an event in which the Frontenac area celebrates the town's establishment. It is complete with a large parade, food vendors, beer & wine tents, children's games, contests & tournaments, fishing derby, pool games, and a Street Dance in the evening. In 2016, community leaders created the Frontenac Heritage Hall, a museum of photo collections and memorabilia from Frontenac's foundation in 1886 to present. It is located in downtown Frontenac, at the corner of McKay and Crawford Streets. Most events are held in downtown Frontenac (with fishing derby held at Frontenac City Park, pool games held at Frontenac City Pool), and celebrated in late May or early June.

== Parks and recreation ==
Frontenac Rotary Park is located east of downtown Frontenac, and is filled with state-of-the-art playground equipment, a pickleball court, and shelter houses for gatherings.

Frontenac City Park is located on the north edge of town, home to several deep fishing pits.

Frontenac Sports Complex, located on the east end of town, is home to a brand new football stadium and track, several baseball and softball diamonds, and a cross-country path. The sports complex is home to the Raiders and Lady Raiders for football, baseball, softball, cross-country, and track and field.

Frontenac Municipal Swimming Pool is located east of Rotary Park.

Frontenac Recreation Center is located in downtown Frontenac, and has state-of-the-art lifting and running machines, in addition to free-weights and biking machines.

Senior Citizens Center, located north of downtown Frontenac.

A brand new hitting facility for baseball and softball players opened up in the parking lot of the football stadium.

== Government ==
Frontenac is governed by a City Council and Mayor. Each is elected every two years. James Kennedy served as Mayor from 1997 to 2018, when the town elected Linda Grilz, its first ever female Mayor.

== Education ==
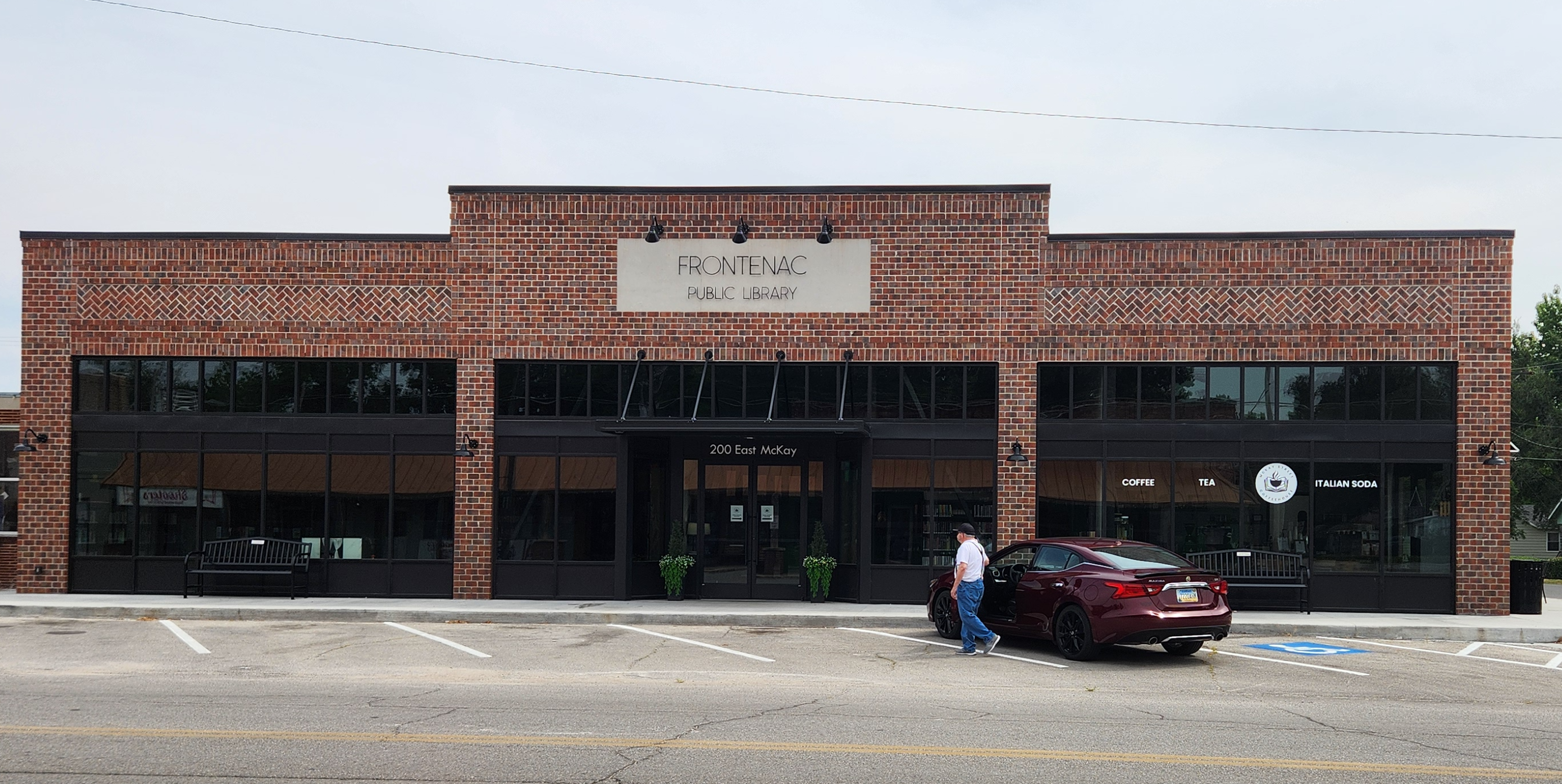
Frontenac Kansas Public Library 2025

=== Primary and secondary education ===
The community is served by Frontenac USD 249 public school district. The district serves primarily in east-central Crawford County, and parts of west-central Barton County, Missouri. It consists of three schools in the city of Frontenac:

- Frontenac High School (Grades 9–12), located at 201 S. Crawford St.
- Frontenac Middle School (Grades 6–8), located at 201 S. Cayuga St.
- Frank Layden Elementary School (Grades Pre-K–5), located at 200 E. Lanyon St.

Frontenac High School competes as Class 3A. The mascot is the Raider & Lady Raider, and the colors are black & white. It is the second largest school system in Crawford County, Kansas, with an average district enrollment of about 1,000 students.

=== Higher education ===
- Fort Scott Community College - Frontenac Campus.
- Harley Davidson Technician Training Center.
- John Deere Technology Center.

== In popular culture ==
Children's author Clare Vanderpool's book Moon Over Manifest is based on Frontenac. The 2010 book takes place in fictional Manifest, Kansas in 1936. The author was born and raised in Wichita, Kansas, but Frontenac is home to her grandparents. The book was awarded the Newbery Medal in 2011, the Spur Award, and was named a Kansas Notable Book.

== Notable people ==
- Andy Pilney, college football player and coach
- Archie San Romani, world-class distance runner and 1936 U.S. Olympian
- Joe Skubitz, United States congressman
- Douglas Youvan, biophysicist and inventor
