= Hole in My Life =

2002 autobiography by Jack Gantos

- First edition
- Author: Jack Gantos
- Genre: Autobiography
- Publisher: Farrar, Straus and Giroux/Macmillan Publishers
- Publication date: 2002
- Pages: 224
- ISBN: 0312641575
- OCLC: 60416727
- LC Class: 2001040957

Hole in My Life is an American autobiography of Jack Gantos and was published by Macmillan Publishers in 2002. In 2003 the book was honored with the Michael L. Printz Award and the same year became a winner of the Robert F. Sibert Medal.

== Plot ==
The book is set in 1971 and discusses the author’s life behind bars. Before prison, Gantos dreamed of becoming a writer and was inspired by William S. Burroughs, who used drugs to get through his life as a writer. After dropping out of university in Saint Croix, Gantos began using hashish and later joined the sail team. There, he became friends with two other men named Hamilton and Rik, the latter of whom promised Gantos $10,000 to sail with him from the Virgin Islands to New York City to sell hash. Gantos accepted the offer and, upon arriving to New York and settling into a hotel, he and his friends were captured by the FBI. Gantos and his co-conspirators all received prison sentences that varied in length from 5 to 20 years for drug trafficking. Gantos was originally sentenced to five years, but was released on good behavior after only serving 15 months of his sentence. While in prison, he worked as an X-ray technician and wrote his thoughts in a journal on a copy of The Brothers Karamazov. Before leaving prison, Gantos applied to a university creative writing program, and he would later begin a new life by selling Christmas trees.

== Reception ==
The book received positive reviews from Kirkus Reviews and Publishers Weekly.
