= Blue Murder (Canadian TV series) =

- Main cast of Blue Murder in Season 1
- Created by: Steve Lucas; Cal Coons
- Starring: Mimi Kuzyk; Joel Keller; Jeremy Ratchford; Maria del Mar; Maurice Dean Wint; Benz Antoine; Tamara Hickey; Kari Matchett; Tracy Waterhouse
- Country of origin: Canada
- No. of seasons: 4
- No. of episodes: 52 (list of episodes)

Production
- Running time: 60 minutes

Original release
- Network: Global
- Release: January 10, 2001 – July 9, 2004

Blue Murder is a Canadian crime drama television series, featuring stories that reflected the turbulence of urban life and the crimes that make headlines. The Blue Murder squad members were an elite group of big-city investigators out to solve some of the city's most complicated and riveting crimes.

== Plot ==
Blue Murder is about a group of police detectives trying to solve murders in Toronto.

== Episodes ==
Season	Episodes	Originally released	
Season	Episodes	First released	Last released
1	13	January 10, 2001	April 2, 2001
2	13	October 12, 2001	January 30, 2002
3	13	January 17, 2003	April 25, 2003
4	13	April 21, 2004	July 9, 2004

== Cast ==
- Mimi Kuzyk as Deputy Chief-of-Police Kay Barrow
- Joel Keller as Det. Ed Oosterhuis
- Jeremy Ratchford as Det. Jack Pogue (seasons 1–3)
- Maria del Mar as Insp. Victoria Castillo (seasons 1–2)
- Catherine Black as Andrea Cowlings (season 1)
- John Boylan as the Deputy Chief of Police Talbot
- Maurice Dean Wint as Cpl. Nathaniel Sweet (season 2)
- Benz Antoine as Det. Jim Weeks (seasons 3–4)
- Tamara Hickey as Det. Karen Gilliam (season 3)
- Kari Matchett as Det. Elaine Bender (season 4)
- Tracy Waterhouse as Det. Ronnie Stahl (season 4)

== Story department ==
- Steve Lucas – Co-Creator, Executive Producer, Writer
- Cal Coons – Co-Creator, Executive Story Editor, Writer
- Jill Golick – Executive Story Editor, Writer
- David Barlow – Executive Story Editor, Writer

== Home media ==
While the British crime drama of the same title has been released on DVD, the Canadian Blue Murder television series has not been released on DVD.
