= Rotten Ralph =

- Created by: Jack Gantos; Nicole Rubel
- Written by: Jill Golick; Briane Nasimok; James R. Backshall; Kenn Scott; Erika Strobel; Luisa Rivosecchi
- Directed by: Sue Pugh; Sue Peters (animation); Bill Martin (art); Terrence Scammell (voice); Richard Dumont (voice); Tim Harper (studio); Simon Cliche (technical)
- Voices of: Rick Jones; Mark Camacho; Jennifer Seguin; Brigid Tierney; Daniel Brochu; Sonja Ball; Terrence Scammell
- Opening theme: He's a Really, Really Rotten Ralph
- Ending theme: He's a Really, Really Rotten Ralph; (Instrumental)
- Composers: Peter Measroch; Leon Aronson; Jerry de Villiers Jr. (music/theme song); Veronica Thomas (theme song lyrics)
- Countries of origin: United Kingdom; Italy; Canada
- Original language: English
- No. of episodes: 55

Production
- Executive producers: Mark Hall (Cosgrove Hall Films); Theresa Plummer-Andrews (BBC); Paul Cadieux (Tooncan); Giuliana Nicademi
- Producer: Steve Jones
- Running time: 11 minutes
- Production companies: Cosgrove Hall Films; Italtoons Corporation; Tooncan Productions, Inc.

Original release
- Network: CBBC; Nickelodeon
- Release: 25 December 1998 – 12 April 2001

Rotten Ralph is a series of children's picture books written by Jack Gantos and illustrated by Nicole Rubel. About twenty Rotten Ralph books have been published from 1976 to 2011. Rotten Ralph is also the first book in the series, a 32-page picture book published by Houghton Mifflin of Boston in 1976. It was the first published book for both Gantos and Rubel.

Alternatively, Rotten Ralph is the title character of the series, initially "a very very nasty cat" —a bright red domestic cat who enjoys playing mean, practical jokes on his human family.

There was a children's television series by Cosgrove Hall Films, Tooncan Productions and Italtoons Corporation based on the books, first broadcast on CBBC from 1998 to 2001. It also went to air on Nickelodeon in the UK too, around 2000. The show hasn't been aired in the UK since reruns ended in 2005. The show aired in the United States on the Fox Family Channel from 1999 to 2001.

== Books ==
All of the Rotten Ralph books have been written by Jack Gantos and illustrated by Nicole Rubel.

- Rotten Ralph (Houghton Mifflin, 1976) @
- Worse than rotten, Ralph (H.M., 1978) @
- Rotten Ralph's rotten Christmas (H.M., 1984) @
- Rotten Ralph's trick or treat (H.M., 1986) @
- Rotten Ralph's show and tell (H.M., 1989) @
- Happy birthday Rotten Ralph (H.M., 1990) @
- Not so Rotten Ralph (H.M., 1994) @
- Rotten Ralph's rotten romance (H.M., 1997) @
- Back to school for Rotten Ralph (HarperCollins, 1998) @
- The Christmas spirit strikes Rotten Ralph (HC, 1998)
- Rotten Ralph's Halloween Howl (HC, 1998)
- Rotten Ralph's Thanksgiving wish (HC, 1999)
- Wedding bells for Rotten Ralph (HC, 1999)
- Rotten Ralph helps out (Farrar, Straus and Giroux, 2001) ‡
- Practice makes perfect for Rotten Ralph (Farrar, 2002) ‡
- Rotten Ralph feels rotten (Farrar, 2004) ‡
- Best in show for Rotten Ralph (Farrar, 2005) ‡
- The nine lives of Rotten Ralph (Houghton Mifflin, 2009) @
- Three strikes for Rotten Ralph (Farrar, 2011) ‡

@ Rotten Ralph Picture Books listed by Gantos (10, nine published by Houghton)
‡ Rotten Ralph Rotten Readers listed by Gantos (5, all published by Farrar)

This list of nineteen titles with publishers and publication dates is compiled from U.S. national library and WorldCat library catalog records. According to a Horn Book Magazine review of The Nine Lives of Rotten Ralph in May 2009, the series had previously comprised "eight picture books (plus four early readers). This ninth volume flashes back to those marvelous stories and the unbridled antics therein, which, unfortunately for Ralph, shaved off eight of his lives." Eight Rotten Ralph books had then been published by Houghton Mifflin, all picture books; Nine Lives was the ninth. Four "rotten readers" had been published by Farrar, Straus and Giroux.

== TV series ==
=== Cast ===
==== Regular characters ====
- Rick Jones - Rotten Ralph
- Jennifer Seguin - Mom
- Mark Camacho - Dad
- Brigid Tierney - Sarah
- Daniel Brochu - Percy
- Sonja Ball - Lulu / Additional Voices
- Terrence Scammell - Fleabag / Bones / Additional Voices
- Richard Dumont - Bongo Bob / Additional Voices

==== Guests ====
- Jaclyn Linetsky - Brenda / Additional Voices
- A.J. Henderson - Buddy / Additional Voices
- Justin Bradley - Kid / Additional Voices
- Helena Evangeliou - Linda / Additional Voices
- Arthur Holden - TV Announcer / Additional Voices
- Eleanor Noble - Additional Voices
- Liz MacRae - Lola / Reporter / Additional Voices
- Harry Standjofski - Naughty Nathan
- Susan Glover - Madame Olga / Additional Voices
- John Stocker - Station Manager / Additional Voices

=== Videocassettes ===
==== United States ====
- Rotten Ralph volume 1 (20th Century Fox Home Entertainment, 1999)
- Rotten Ralph volume 2 (20th Century Fox Home Entertainment, 1999)

=== Episode list ===
#	Title	Description!
1	The Taming of the Ralph	Ralph is captured by an evil clown when he follows Sarah and the family to the circus.
2	Not so Rotten Ralph	Ralph has a difficult time when Cousin Percy comes to stay.
3	Happy Birthday Rotten Ralph	Ralph thinks that everyone has forgotten his birthday.
4	Dead Man's Drop	Ralph takes up a challenge on his new bike.
5	The Contest	Ralph enters a competition.
6	The Bongo Bob Show	Bongo Bob visits Ralph.
7	Rotten Ralph's Robbery	Ralph is persuaded to steal a doll for Sarah.
8	Purrfect Pet	Sarah is having a pet day at school and doesn't know if she can take Ralph.
9	Boogie Woogie Ralph	Ralph gets his paws on Dad's new stereo.
10	Kung Fu Kitty	Ralph becomes concerned that he will be replaced by a watchdog and learns how to protect the family house from burglars.
11	Ralph's Super Duper Bloopers	Ralph decides to make his own home video for the 'Bloopers and Blunders Show'.
12	The Whole Rotten Truth	Ralph is sworn to tell the truth and it turns out to be more fun than he thought.
13	Feline Fad	Ralph spends the entire week's grocery money on cereal in an attempt to complete his sticker collection.
14	Rotten to the Core	Ralph causes havoc when he misunderstands what Dad's new job entails.
15	Ralph's Royal Treatment	Ralph is denied television as a punishment.
16	One of Nine Lives	Ralph saves Percy's life.
17	Ralph's Kitten	Ralph is put in charge of a lost kitten who comes to stay.
18	Ralph's Nightmare	Ralph decides never to sleep again after having a rotten dream.
19	Twinkle Toes	Ralph is forced to step in as Sarah's partner for her dance recital.
20	Science Contest	Sarah and Ralph decide to enter the school science contest together.
21	Grandma's Visit	Ralph has to be on his best behaviour for Grandma's visit.
22	World Cup Ralph	Ralph learns a bit about sportsmanship.
23	Ralph's Rival	Ralph is jealous of Sarah's new friend.
24	Elementary, My Dear Ralph	Ralph gets the blame for something he didn't do.
25	Cat Got your Tongue	With the family bird-watching, Ralph makes a deal with them that he can keep his lips zipped for a while.
26	Walk and Roll	Dad ends up injured and in a wheelchair due to Ralph leaving out a skateboard.
27	Attack of the Killer Fleas	Fleas invade in on Ralph's fur.
28	Just Cuz	Ralph and Percy are not too fond of their visiting country cousin Ivan drops over for a visit.
29	Point of No Return	Ralph forgets to return a video.
30	The Ralph Who Cried Wolf	When a neighbour calls the fire brigade to rescue Ralph from a tree, he finds that he rather enjoys being the centre of attention.
31	Percy in Love	Percy falls in love with alley cat Lola and needs Ralph's expert help to charm her. Will Ralph actually help him or will he be a rotten trickster as usual?
32	Talent Contest	When Ralph discovers the top prize in a talent contest is a trip to Pleasure World, he's determined to help Sarah win so he can go with her. But when he purposefully ruins everyone else's act, Sarah decides he's been just a little too rotten and takes her school friend instead!
33	I Know What You're Doing This Summer!	Sarah's going to summer camp and Ralph is desperate to go with her. But can he survive without his creature comforts?
34	Good Job, Ralph	In an effort to keep him from bothering the plumber, Mum takes Ralph to work.
35	The Art of Being Rotten	Ralph's artistic talents are discovered by the famous artist Manfred Moon.
36	Knucklehead	Ralph invents a pretend friend to play with.
37	Radio Free Ralph	When Ralph's favourite DJ is taken off the air for being too rude, Ralph decides to pay his replacement a visit at the radio station.
38	Untitled	Ralph's rural cousin regales with him embarrassing tales.
39	Surf's Up, Ralph	The family goes to the beach on a very hot day while Ralph does nothing but cause amok per usual on their outing.
40	Ralph's Rotten Tooth	Ralph's toothache forces him to visit the dreaded dentist.
41	Cat Psychology	After Ralph attempts to fix the engine of the car, Dad decides that it's time for Ralph to behave like a real cat. This drives Ralph to the point of insanity, until he realized that there are two sides to acting like a real cat. The side that Dad wants and the side that would drive him out of his mind...
42	Ralph's Bedside Manner	Ralph tries to nurse the family back to health in his own very special way.
43	Anything for a Buck	Ralph holds his own car boot sale.
44	Kit 'n' Kin	Ralph offers to babysit for next-door's cute kitty.
45	Sweatin' with Ralph	Sarah decides it's about time Ralph got into shape and stopped lounging around.
46	Snowbound	The snow is falling thick and fast, but with his trusty blanket and remote control, Ralph doesn't see it as a problem - until there's a power cut.
47	Secret Life of Mom	Ralph is determined to discover what activity Mom could possibly plan without the family.
48	Mispresented Ralph	Ralph tries to prove to the neighborhood that he is not a cute cat from a newspaper - he proves that he's an absolute menace.
49	Country Club Ralph	Ralph invades the country club and he wreaks havoc by posing as a golf caddy.
50	Rotten Repair Service	When the plumbing is on the fritz, Ralph wants to help the family out and get extra money, but things get worse.
51	Party Animals	Ralph attempts to teach Sarah how to be a "party animal".
52	Dad's Time To Shine	When Mom goes away on a trip, Dad's mom comes by is in left in charge and Dad wants to do things around the house on his own.
53		
54		
55		
