= Moon Over Manifest =

2010 children's novel by Clare Vanderpool

- Front cover
- Author: Clare Vanderpool
- Cover artist: Richard Tuschman
- Language: English
- Genre: Children's literature, Historical fiction
- Publisher: Delacorte Press
- Publication date: 2010
- Media type: Print (Hardcover)
- Pages: 351
- ISBN: 978-0-385-73883-5
- OCLC: 460709773
- LC Class: PZ7.P28393 Mo 2010

Moon Over Manifest is a 2010 children's novel written by American Clare Vanderpool. The book was awarded the 2011 Newbery Medal for excellence in children's literature, the Spur Award for best Western juvenile fiction, and was named a Kansas Notable Book. The story follows a young and adventurous girl named Abilene who is sent to Manifest, Kansas by her father in the summer of 1936. The author's note at the end of the book states the fictional town of Manifest, Kansas, is based on the real town of Frontenac, Kansas.

== Plot summary ==
In 1936, twelve-year-old Abilene Tucker is sent by her father Gideon to the small town of Manifest, Kansas. Abilene arrives to find the town run-down and greatly affected by the Great Depression. A pastor takes her in, and in that house, she discovers a box of mementos and letters from a boy named Ned addressed to a boy named Jinx stashed away under a floorboard. One letter mentions the "Rattler." Abilene and her two friends, Lettie and Ruthanne, believe the Rattler was a German spy in 1918. After some investigating, they receive a note telling them to "leave well enough alone."

Realizing that she lost her father's compass while searching for the spy, Abilene walks down the "Path to Perdition", a house where Miss Sadie, a diviner, lived, to search for it. On the way, Abilene accidentally breaks a diviner's pot. To pay off her debt and earn her compass back from the diviner, Abilene does odd jobs for her: she tills dry soil during a drought, plants seeds in it, and hunts for strange plants, all of which seem to have no useful purpose.

Sensing that Abilene feels abandoned by her father, the diviner tells her a story of the past about two boys in Manifest in 1918 called Jinx and Ned. Jinx is a twelve-year-old con artist who leaves his partner after thinking he accidentally killed a man, and Ned, the writer of the letters, is a fifteen-year-old adopted boy who used Jinx's skills to sign up for the army underage. He leaves Jinx his compass when he goes off to war and writes him letters from the battlefield. At the time, Manifest is controlled by the owners of the mine because there are no jobs or money without them during the war; the owners pay the workers very little and force them to work more shifts.

After a land-owning widow dies, the mine owners desire that piece of land for their own profit. However, the town has first pick, and they need to raise $1,000 for it before the deadline. They don't want the mine owners to know about it, or else they'd give them more work and also stop them from raising the money, so everyone feigns illness and puts the town under quarantine to get rid of the mine owners. They sell a healing elixir and raise most of the money, but someone reveals their plans to the mine owners, causing them to return and put everyone back to work.

A government official, the nephew of a resident of Manifest, tricks one of the mine owners into buying part of the land up for sale because of the "healing spring" he could use to make a fortune. However, it is regular water, and the tax he paid for the land goes to the town, giving them enough money to buy the rest of the land. Soon afterwards, the fooled man sells his part of the land for a fraction of the cost he paid for it. Meanwhile, Jinx confronts his old partner in crime and discovers that the partner is the one who killed the man, not Jinx. The old partner dies when trying to pursue Jinx. The town celebrates its triumph over the mine owners, only to be crushed by news of the death of the well-known Ned in St-Dzier, France, on October 8, 1918. Jinx thinks it was his fault that Ned was killed by the Germans. He leaves Manifest for good. Soon after, Spanish influenza kills many people in Manifest and the town becomes the run-down, battered outpost Abilene knows.

Abilene hears the story and matches the letters and mementos she had to the story the diviner told her. She put the pieces together and discovered that Jinx was her father; when she got a cut and became very ill, her father began acting differently around her because he thought it was his fault, which it wasn't. That was the reason he left her in Manifest. Furthermore, Ned was the son of the diviner, who had been keeping watch on her son from afar. After sending a telegram to her father, feigning ill herself, she discovered that the Rattler was a story someone made up after seeing a nun and her rattling rosary in the woods at night. The "spy" they happened to find was the undertaker, the person who had revealed the town's trick to the mine owners almost twenty years ago. He was afraid that the kids had found out about that, so he sent them the note to scare them. Abilene's father returned to Manifest and found that his daughter wasn't ill, and after she told him about knowing about his past, he understood her when she asked him to stay. They go into Manifest together to rebuild their lives.

== Characters ==
=== Main characters ===
- Abilene Tucker, a brave 12-year-old girl stuck in a small town after a life on the road begins to learn about the town's history and how it ties in with her own. She is very confident, almost to the point of being plucky.
- Miss Sadie Redizon, a mysterious Hungarian fortune teller who only tells stories about the past.
- Jinx (Gideon Tucker), a boy that comes to Manifest and changes it. Jinx was a friend of Ned.
- Soletta (Lettie) Taylor, Abilene's friend who is helping find the Rattler and Ruthanne's cousin.
- Benedek (Ned) Gillen, son of Miss Sadie and friend of Jinx. Ned appears only in flashbacks and died in World War I on the battlefield.

=== Minor characters ===
- Gideon Tucker, Abilene's father who sends her to stay with a friend in the town.
- Hattie Mae Harper, the town's newspaper reporter who helps Abilene research her family's past.
- Sister Redempta, the town's school teacher nun, also helps with other affairs.
- Mr. Underhill, an undertaker.

== Reception ==
Moon Over Manifest has been received favorably. Kirkus Reviews described it as "richly detailed, splendidly written", while Publishers Weekly saw a "memorable coming-of-age story" and "Replete with historical details and surprises, Vanderpool's debut delights, while giving insight into family and community." Common Sense Media called it "a nostalgic, robust story". Booklist found it "like sucking on a butterscotch. Smooth and sweet." School Library Journal said that "thoroughly enjoyable, unique page-turner [Moon Over Manifest] is a definite winner."

Awards
| Preceded by When You Reach Me | Newbery Medal recipient 2011 | Succeeded by Dead End in Norvelt |
