= Douglas Youvan =

American scientist

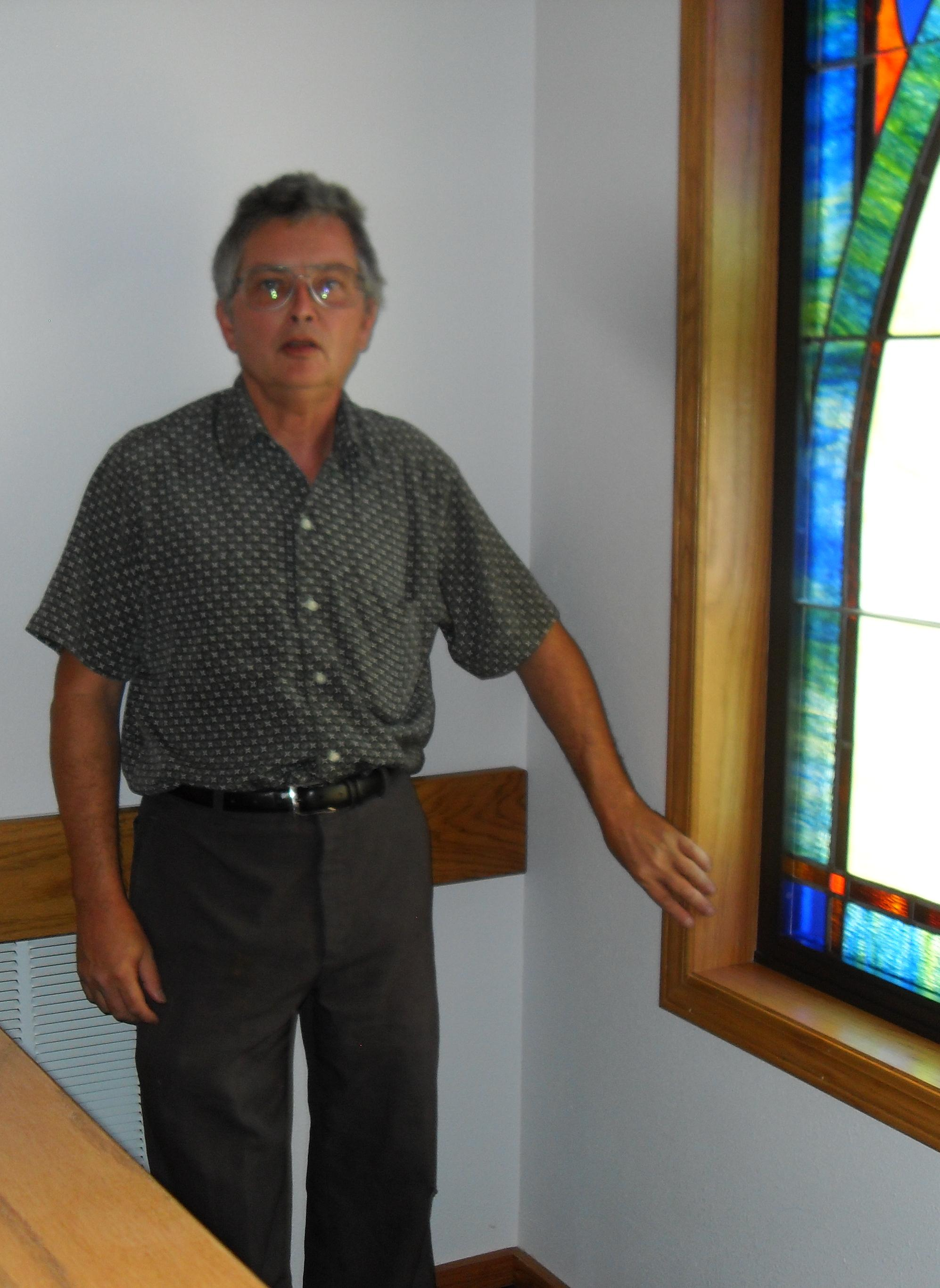
- Douglas Youvan, 2010
- Born: January 29, 1955 (age 71); Frontenac, Kansas
- Education: University of California, Berkeley
- Scientific career
- Fields: Biophysics
- Workplaces: MIT and Kairos Scientific Inc.

Douglas Charles Youvan (born January 29, 1955) is an American biophysicist and mathematician.

== Biography ==
Youvan received an associate degree in electronics and a bachelor's degree in biology from Pittsburg State University. He received his Ph.D. degree in biophysics from UC Berkeley in 1981.

Youvan was an associate professor of chemistry at MIT, where he specialized in the study of photosynthesis, specifically the spectral analysis of photosynthetic bacteria. Youvan, along with Mary M. Yang, developed instrumentation to study the spectra of bacteria directly from a petri dish.

== Research focus ==
In his 1981 Ph.D. thesis, Youvan found inhibitors (hypermodified nucleosides) of retroviral reverse transcriptase present in ribosomal RNA.

His work correctly predicted the secondary structure of the 11 transmembrane helices of the reaction center as confirmed by X-ray crystallography. In 1987 Youvan and E. Bylina constructed the first site-directed mutants of bacterial reaction centers.
