= Dead End in Norvelt =

2011 book by Jack Gantos

- First edition
- Author: Jack Gantos
- Language: English
- Genre: Children's historical novel, autobiographical novel, mystery, comedy, political economy
- Publisher: Farrar, Straus and Giroux
- Publication date: September 13, 2011
- Publication place: United States
- Media type: Print (hardcover)
- Pages: 341 pp
- ISBN: 978-0-374-37993-3
- OCLC: 692290969
- LC Class: PZ7.G15334 Dd 2011
- Followed by: From Norvelt to Nowhere

Dead End in Norvelt is an autobiographical novel by the American author Jack Gantos, published by Farrar, Straus, and Giroux in 2011. It features a boy named Jack Gantos and is based in the author's hometown, Norvelt, Pennsylvania.

== Reception ==
According to one reviewer, the "real hero" is "his home town and its values", a "defiantly political" message.

The American Library Association awarded Gantos and Dead End the 2012 Newbery Medal, honoring the book as the year's "most distinguished contribution to American literature for children". It also won the annual Scott O'Dell Award for Historical Fiction. In Britain, where it was published by the Transworld Publishers imprint Corgi Books, it was one of eight books on the longlist for the annual Guardian Children's Fiction Prize.

Newbery medal judges called the book "achingly funny" and one British reviewer called it "rib-splitting".

== Plot ==
Dead End in Norvelt takes place during the summer of 1962, after the American schoolboy Jack Gantos fires his father's war trophy, a Japanese sniper rifle, at a war movie playing at a drive-in movie theater thinking it is unloaded. However, a bullet somehow flies out, causing a nosebleed. As punishment, he must stay in the house except as sent by his mother to help their elderly neighbor Miss Volker who Jack meets apparently boiling her hands in a large pot. Thinking she has gone insane and melted the flesh off her hands, Jack faints and gets his second nosebleed of the book. It turns out that Miss Volker, the obituary writer for the local paper, had been melting paraffin on her hands to combat arthritis, and needs Jack's help in typing the obituaries. Miss Volker, the town's medical examiner and a former nurse, notices that elderly, "original Norvelters" are dying away mysteriously. Later, a Hells Angel gang member is hit by a cement truck near the Norvelt pants factory after crazily dancing a three-mile stretch from a Mt. Pleasant bar. This ends up causing the rest of the Hells Angel gang to cause mayhem in the town, lighting unoccupied houses on fire and stealing the most expensive casket from Mr. Huffer's funeral parlor for their fallen brother.

Later, Jack's dad acquires a Piper J-3 Cub, and assigns Jack to dig an underground bomb shelter as his dad builds a runway for the plane. Around this time, Jack has a red Plymouth Valiant promised to him from Miss Volker as a birthday present after he had been driving it as Miss Volker's chauffeur. As Jack thinks about the strange rate of deaths in original Norvelters, he realizes that thin mint Girl Scout cookies given out to the original Norvelters through the Community Center may have something to do with it because many of those people rely on it, along with his mom's homemade casseroles, for food. Soon, Miss Volker is placed under house arrest when the police find chocolates, gifted to her by her one-way lover Mr. Spizz, poisoned with 1080 (to kill rodents) in her basement and accuse her of feeding them to the old Norvelters. Later, Jack gets a call from Mr. Spizz, who was supervising Miss Volker's house arrest, to come down to her house. When Jack gets there, Miss Volker says that Mr. Spizz had admitted to secretly poisoning the Original Norvelters to try to get her to marry him, and that he had stolen Jack's car to get a six-hour headstart on the county police.

The book concludes with Jack being picked up in his dad's J-3 and doing some "bombing runs" with paint-filled balloons on the Viking drive-in theater, during which he decides it is not that fun and asks to be let down back on the ball field. Finally, an inset paragraph (styled after the "In this day in history" section that Miss Volker employed Jack to type along with the obits in the Norvelt news) talks about Jack being ungrounded.

== Themes ==
In the book Dead End in Norvelt, people use power to control others. The Newbery Medal judges, who are American children's librarians, cited the importance of history and reading. The Guardian Prize judges, who are British children's novelists, cited "self-sufficiency, community, and neighbourliness".

One reviewer of Dead End in Norvelt, children's writer Josh Lacey, called it "defiantly political"; one of its messages is "don't forget the narratives of American life that have been neglected or deliberately buried by the dominant culture." "[T]he real hero of the novel isn't Jack himself, but his home town and its values. Norvelt was a New Deal town built by the US government to house poor families and named after Eleanor Roosevelt, described by Miss Volker as 'the greatest American woman who has ever lived'."

== Level ==
Another Irish reviewer suggested that "every Elder will be able to relate to Jack's character" and recommended the book for readers age 9 to 13. The Guardian Prize judges recommended it for ages 12 and up.

== See also ==
Awards
| Preceded by Moon Over Manifest | Newbery Medal recipient 2012 | Succeeded by The One and Only Ivan |
