= Ruby Skye P.I. =

- Genre: Web Series; Tween Comedy; Detective Mystery
- Created by: Jill Golick
- Starring: Madison Cheeatow; Marlee Maslove; Elena Gorgevska; Scott Beaudin
- Country of origin: Canada
- Original language: English/French subtitles
- No. of seasons: 3
- No. of episodes: 26

Production
- Executive producers: Karen Walton; Steven Golick; Jill Golick
- Production locations: Toronto, Ontario, Canada
- Running time: 5-8 minutes

Original release
- Release: October 25, 2010 – December 12, 2012

Ruby Skye PI is a Canadian web series created by Jill Golick. The first two seasons, The Spam Scam and The Haunted Library, were shown on YouTube over the course of a few months and has since been shown on Koldcast, Vimeo, blip.tv, DigitalChickTV, Clicker, and MinglemediaTV. Ruby Skye PI has earned plaudits from numerous festivals, including the ITN Festival, the Banff World Media Festival, and the LA Web Festival. The web series follows the detective work of Ruby Skye as she tries to solve mysteries using her keen powers of observation.

== Cast ==
- Madison Cheeatow as Ruby Skye, budding detective.
- Marlee Maslove as Hailey Skye, advocate for a water bottle ban, tech wizard, and Ruby's little sister.
- Elena Gorgevska as Diana Noughton, the one who mysteriously hates Ruby Skye.
- Scott Beaudin as Edmund O'Fyne, the mysterious new boy who's been seen around the O'Deary Library.

=== Recurring characters ===
- Kevin Gutierrez as Griffin Lane, Ruby's best friend.
- Ali Adatia as Vinnie, the new janitor at the Dragon Academy.
- Ryan Egan as Flint Shearson, Ms. Springer's new beau.
- Nawa Nicole Simon as Ms. Springer, former military commander, avid bird watcher and computer teacher.
- Kirklynne Garrett as Mrs. Gooje, Ruby's neighbour.
- Raj Verman as Gary, owner of the local ice cream shop.
- Rodrigo Fernandez-Stoll as Griffin's Father, an unemployed musician.
- Pui-Ling Tam as Constable Officer
- Sarah Higgins as Library Woman
- Laska Sawade as Shop Keeper
- Rosemary Dunsmore as Ava O'Deary, the eccentric owner of the O'Deary Library
- Samantha Wan as Ophelia Bedelia, the librarian at the O'Deary Library
- Laura Decarteret as Lillian O'Shyte, Ava's odd relative, who wants to turn the library into an adults-only condo.
- Jordan Prentice as Henry O'Henry, Ava's relative who has a penchant for speaking with a British accent.
- Geri Hall as Gifted Sarah
- Shaun Shetty as Finch
- Samii Folliot as Cocoa, one of The Mint Chip Girls, an all girl rock group.
- Sydney Klune as Dylan, one of The Mint Chip Girls, an all girl rock group.
- Dana Edmonds Wong as Ulla, one of The Mint Chip Girls, an all girl rock group.

== Production ==
Ruby Skye P.I. is the brainchild of the digital pioneer Jill Golick, and is directed by Kelly Harms and produced by Karen Walton, Kerry Young and Golick under the flag of her company, Story2.OH. Golick and Julie Strassman, Golick's writing partner, crafted the story and then developed the character of Ruby to go along with it. They applied to the Independent Production Fund and then wrote the scripts when they had the money. They had the green light from IPF on June 18, 2010, and shot all 12 episodes of the first season in early August of that year.

=== Transmedia ===
Ruby Skye P.I. has a unique relationship with its audience in that the creators are immediately accessible. They have a dedicated Twitter account, Facebook group, Tumblr account, and YouTube page. Their official website allows audience members to interact with the show, from reading blog entries relating to content to playing games of rock, paper, scissors. Despite their openness, Jill Golick, speaking at a Writers Guild of Canada event, said of Ruby Skye's audience that they "created opportunities on the website for our audience to participate and be part of a community and we'll do that much more with the storytelling next time around".

As of the second season, Ruby Skye P.I. has several websites that lend to the transmedial experience. These include O'Deary Library, O'Deary Puzzles, blogs for Hailey, Diana and The Mint Chip Girls, as well as several other ways to participate with the series on a deeper digital level.

== Critical reception ==
Those Video Guys states that "Madison Cheeatow is a fantastic actress and she really has the charisma to hold together a series that is purely based on her and her character." James Floyd Kelly, part of GeekDad on Wired.com, said of the series, "As I continued to watch the series and be introduced to key characters, I was happy to see that the character of Ruby (and her friends and family) don't seem to fall into stereotypes." Kelly went onto say that she had "to give credit to the team that has developed Ruby Skye, P.I. — its got to be very hard to write, film, and release a show for young adults that doesn't take the easy route to try to get our kids' attentions. With so many television shows containing violence, sex, and harsh language, it's actually quite nice to watch a well-written and professionally edited web series. The dialogue is realistic (you won't find those 2-minute-long monologues here), the mystery is interesting (and based on a real-world scam), and the characters are likable." Clicker.com likens Ruby Skye P.I. to hit teen shows from the 1990s. They said: "The mysteries may be silly—ranging from a Nigerian money scam to a sham wedding—but you feel it every time Ruby makes a mistake, or when her friends turn on her a la "Harriet". And true to those wonderful '90s shows, the adults are hilariously bumbling and over the top, from villains to supporting characters."

IPF executive director Andra Sheffer referring to Ruby Skye PI's building audience, said, "It's not like TV or film, where you have the launch night and sit back, hoping the audience comes. This is the continual building of an audience."

=== Awards ===
- New York Television Festival - Best Family Pilot
- Interactive Rockie for Best Online Program - Children & Youth June 15, 2011
- Best Shorts Award of Excellence
- IndieFest Award - Best Shorts Award of Excellence: Web series
- Outstanding Interactive Narrative Comedy: Jill Golick (Creator); Kerry Young, Steven Golick, Karen Walton, Jill Golick (Producers)
- Outstanding Lead Actress – Interactive Narrative Comedy: Madison Cheeatow
- Outstanding Supporting Actress – Interactive Narrative Comedy: Nawa Nicole Simon
- Outstanding Writing – Interactive Narrative Comedy: Julie Strassman-Cohn, Jill Golick
- Outstanding Directing – Interactive Narrative Comedy: Kelly Harms
- Outstanding Cinematography – Interactive Narrative Comedy: Alex Dacev
- Outstanding Editing – Interactive Narrative Comedy: Jennifer Essex-Chew, Ben Manthorpe, Mike Reisacher, Tiffany Beaudoin
- Outstanding Score – Interactive Narrative Comedy: Studiocat Sound and Music, Composer
- Three Telly Awards
- Youth Media Alliance Award of Excellence for Best Original Interactive Content
- ITN Fest's Best International Web series

==== Nominations ====
- Golden Sheaf Award - Children and Youth Productions
- New Media Film Festival Audience Choice Award
- WGC Screenwriting Awards Finalist - Shorts and Webseries
- Indie Intertube Awards: Best Series to Show to Your Mother
- Indie Soap Awards: Best Writing, Best Editing, Best Visual Effects, Best Makeup, Best Original Score
- IAWTV Awards 2011: Best Website

=== Festival selections ===
- Official selection in the New York Television Festival
- First Glance Philadelphia
- ITVFest (Los Angeles)
- Mississauga Independent Film Festival
- ITN Film Festival (Los Angeles)
- L.A. Web Festival
- Sharp Cuts (Guelph)
- Yorkton Film Festival
- Marseilles Web Festival 2013

== Episode synopsis ==
=== Season One: The Spam Scam ===
| Episode # | Episode name | Synopsis | First shown |
|---|---|---|---|
| 1 | Animal Farm | Ruby Skye discovers that her neighbour Mrs Gooje has been the victim of the Nigerian email scam. She decides to try to get to the bottom of it. Ruby bribes her sister, Hailey to look at the email. She realises that the IP address used to send the email came from their school, the Dragon Academy, which means that the scammer could be someone they know. | October 25, 2010 |
| 2 | Kay Eye Ess Ess | Ruby notices that her best friend Griffin has a new iPhone and decides to do some detective work. Her teacher, Ms. Springer, is also acting strangely nice. Ms. Springer writes on a piece of paper then tosses it into the recycling bin. Ruby hangs back after class to go through the recycling bin when she is caught by the new janitor, Vinnie. She beats him at a game of rock, paper, scissors. The sheet of paper has scrawled pictures of hearts and flowers all over it so Ruby decides to follow Ms. Springer to see what's really going on. Turns out that her crush is even meaner than Ms. Springer. Later, at Griffin's house, Ruby notices a new TV and computer games. As Griffin plays, Ruby delves through his computer history and discovers that he has been researching the Nigerian scam. | October 28, 2010 |
| 3 | Break In | Ruby owes Hailey a total of four hours shopping after bribing her to get the name of Ms. Springer's crush on her petition and hacking into Griffin's email account. Hailey hacks into his computer at school while Ruby distracts Vinnie with another game of rock, paper, scissors. In a series of hidden folders, Ruby discovers the email sent to Mrs. Gooje. | November 1, 2010 |
| 4 | A Real Green Dress | Ruby has a new issue: to try and persuade Griffin to give back the money without getting the police involved. While shopping, Ruby bumps into Diana, a girl at school who has been giving her a hard time. As Diana offers her shopping advice Flint Shearson comes in to distract her, leaving Diana an opportunity to plant a scarf on Ruby. Ruby chases after Flint only to find herself in trouble with the police for shoplifting. | November 4, 2010 |
| 5 | Caught Ruby Red Handed | When the police officer goes through Ruby's backpack she finds evidence against Griffin in the email scam. Griffin has his computer taken and is threatened with charges. Griffin tells Ruby via text message that he wants her out of his life. | November 8, 2010 |
| 6 | Sister Act | Ruby meets Gary on the street and discovers that he has been a victim of the spam scam too, not only losing money but his lucky hat too. He last received an email that morning, which clears Griffin of the crime as he has no access to his email. After Hailey asks the class to sign her water bottle ban petition Ruby discovers that Hailey has both the means and opportunity to set up an email scam: she has everyone's email addresses! | November 11, 2010 |
| 7 | Stalled | Ruby admits she may have made a dire mistake accusing Hailey of the crime. She lacks means, motive, and opportunity. Ms. Springer, however, has the ability to access everyone's account. She overhears Ms. Springer talk to her mother on the phone about a letter. Ruby sneaks into the computer lab to find Vinnie reading her book on detective work. She searches through Ms. Springer's things and finds her letter. Assuming that the letter came from Flint, Ruby discovers that he cannot marry Ms. Springer because he does not have the money to support her. This gives Ms. Springer motive! Ruby follows Flint and overhears his phone call. He is persuaded to marry Ms Springer for her money. | November 15, 2010 |
| 8 | Scissor Sandwich | Hoping to follow Flint, Ruby accidentally brings attention to herself. Running from him she bumps into Vince. He offers her protection. Hailey and Griffin are still refusing to talk to her and now she needs to stop a wedding! Diana offers to buy Hailey and Griffin ice-creams. Ruby realises that she has a lot of money lately, so it could just be her. Stealing Hailey's phone, Ruby sends a text to Griffin and uses Griffin's email account to contact Hailey, but while she waits for them Vince and Flint enter the classroom. They play rock, paper, scissors. Clearly these two know each other. Vince pulls out Gary's lucky hat and puts it on. | November 18, 2010 |
| 9 | Tossed | Realising that Vince and Flint are using Ms. Springer's class and Hailey's petition to conduct the Nigerian Spam Scam, Ruby hides under the desk to listen to their plot. Vince gives Flint the wedding ring and tells him to get to the wedding in half an hour. The door creaks. Griffin, who has been listening at the door runs away but is caught by Vince. Ruby stands up for him, but that only leaves them both trapped in a closet together with Vince standing guard outside. Ruby asks Griffin to text Hailey to warn her, but Ruby still has her phone. | November 22, 2010 |
| 10 | Seven Minutes in Heaven | Griffin reveals why he has been so cagey about his new gear: he is worried that his father is a thief. Ruby reassures him that he is not. They make up. Hailey is thrown into the closet. Ruby looks for a way out: she uses Griffin's Mentos and the soda in the closet to create a soda explosion. They escape from Vinnie but he's still after them. | November 25, 2010 |
| 11 | Best Served Cold | Ruby, Hailey, and Griffin run away from Vinnie. They split up, Ruby leading Vinnie away from the other two. Mrs. Gooje's imaginary dog attacks Vinnie, giving her a head start. Ruby walks into Gary's ice cream shop to hide and comes across Diana. Enacting revenge for setting her up, Ruby knocks Diana's ice cream into her shirt. Vinnie, Mrs. Gooje, and Gary who sees Vinnie wearing his lucky hat chase after Ruby. She leads them through Ms. Springer's wedding, stops her from marrying Flint, and brings them to Hailey's water bottle rally. They push a water bottle mountain onto the two scammers and the police arrest them. | November 29, 2010 |
| 12 | Duh Duh Duhn | Ruby goes to apologize to Griffin again, but he is only concerned about his father being a thief. Griffin's Dad goes to play music with his friend and as he turns Ruby sees something familiar hanging out of his backpack. She goes to Ms. Springer's classroom to collect Hailey's petition but she's already left to mail it to City Hall. Ms. Springer thanks Ruby for her help in cancelling the wedding. Ruby stops Hailey from mailing the petition with the promise of yet another hour of shopping to discover that Griffin's Dad signed the petition without Hailey ever seeing him. Ruby drags Griffin to meet up with a clown who turns out to be his Dad. With that last mystery solved, Ruby cannot help but be intrigued by talk of a haunted library. | December 2, 2010 |

=== Season Two: The Haunted Library ===
Season two began on October 10, 2012.

| Episode # | Episode name | Synopsis | First shown |
|---|---|---|---|
| 1 | A Well-Read Poltergeist | Ruby finds herself in another mysterious mess, and this time, the culprit may just be supernatural! On a routine trip to the O'Deary Library with her sister Hailey, Ruby overhears a conversation between the owner, Ava O'Deary, and the librarian, Ophelia Bedelia. Ophelia is terrified because of strange, late night activities in the library, and she suspects the worst: the library is haunted! Ruby springs into action, and it isn't long before she finds herself in a spooky whirlwind of paranormal activity. | October 10, 2012 |
| 2 | Ava's Last Puzzle | Ruby is in way over her head. With indisputable paranormal evidence piling up around her, she edges closer and closer to the truth: is the O'Deary Library really haunted after all? And what exactly happened at the séance? Books can't slip off shelves and propel themselves through the air of their own accord... can they?! If that weren't scary enough, it seems like Ruby's nemesis, Diana, is haunting the halls of O'Deary Library, too. Diana has discovered that Ruby's sister, Hailey, is participating in a fundraising challenge for Because I Am a Girl (campaign). The winner gets tickets to see The Mint Chip Girls in concert. Diana is determined to win those tickets. And Ruby is just as determined to prevent her from getting them. And there's one more mystery for Ruby to investigate: who is that hot, young man and where does he keep disappearing to? | October 17, 2012 |
| 3 | Where there's no will, there's a way | Things are getting out of control, and fast. Library owner, Ava O'Deary is dead but there's no Will to determine the fate of her fortune and the O'Deary Library. That means Ava's nearest relative, Lillian O'Shyte, will inherit everything. Lillian plans to burn the books and turn the library into an adults-only condo building. Ruby can't let that happen, but what can she do to stop it? Ruby has one idea: solve Ava's Last Puzzle! That's how Ruby discovers a video message from the late Ava O'Deary. Ava has left a trail of clues that lead to her will. The heir who finds the Will inherits everything. Ruby joins the hunt for the will, all the while trying to get to the bottom of where these mysterious family members' loyalties really lie. | October 24, 2012 |
| 4 | #Creepy | Ruby has discovered Ava's first clue inside Alice's Adventures in Wonderland. Now, she suddenly finds herself being pursued on all sides by Ava's questionable relatives! With Henry and Lillian both competing to win Ruby's help in solving the case, the young detective will have to do what she does best: solve the case herself! Ruby decides to hide in the library until after closing so she can search the place thoroughly with no one else around. No one except her poor unsuspecting sister who gets trapped in the library too. After dark, O'Deary Library is even spookier than usual. Ruby is uncovers new clues but there is also some ghostly activity that defies explanation. Can the Skye sisters make it through the night, alone in the haunted library? | October 31, 2012 |
| 5 | Edmund! | More clues and even more mystery: the secret to Ava's Will is still out there, and Ruby is hot on the trail. After a long, scary night searching for more clues in O'Deary library, Ruby and Hailey have learned at least one thing: the library is definitely haunted! Pursued by shadowy figures, floating books, and creepy noises, the two sisters are seriously freaked out! Luckily, their spooky night wasn't a waste: more clues have led them to Ava's email address and to their surprise, the ghost of Ava answers their email, bringing them several steps closer to the Will. Ruby is hot on the trail of the Will. But she'll find herself making a hard choices– and seeking help from an unexpected source. | November 7, 2012 |
| 6 | A Regular Sherlock Holmes | Hailey is furious at Ruby – with good reason. Which means Ruby's on the hunt for a new sidekick in her hunt for Ava O'Deary's missing will. The mysterious, handsome Edmund seems to be volunteering for the mission. Could life get any better? Together, Ruby and Edmund decipher a few of Ava's puzzle-clues and discover the locations of a few more. Then Ruby remembers Hailey's Pink Lemonaid Stand in support of Because I Am A Girl and races off to help. But it's too late! Ruby discovers that keeping her sister up all night may have cost Hailey the contest! To the heinous Diana, no less. But Ruby has a plan to redeem herself in her sister's eyes... Or does she just want to defeat Diana? Either way, it means raising money by joining forces with one of Ava O'Deary's odd relatives in the hunt for the Will. | November 21, 2012 |
| 7 | On the Trail of a Thief | Ruby's kit is missing and all the money for Hailey's Because I Am A Girl campaign along with it. Ruby knows just who took it: Diana! Ruby is determined to get the money back. Dragging Hailey along with her, Ruby trails Diana to neighbourhood ice cream parlour, The Big Chill. With Diana inside ordering, Ruby sees her opportunity to search Diana's bag to find the missing money. Only Hailey refuses to stand guard and Ruby gets a call from her old friend: Griffin! And then everything just goes from bad to worse to horrible. | November 28, 2012 |
| 8 | The Final Clue | With the ghost's identity revealed, Hailey in trouble and Henry and Lillian joining forces against her, Ruby Skye finds herself very alone in her hunt for Ava's Will and her quest to save the library. Having collected nearly all of the clues, Ruby sneaks back into the library to get her hands on the last few pieces of the puzzle. But while eluding the capture of the terrible twosome, Ruby finds herself in another, even stickier situation and there's a new twist. Now, with almost all of the mysteries revealed, Ruby will have to race against time to get to the Will and make sure it ends up in the hands of the only deserving heir. | December 5, 2012 |
| 9 | Apparently the Heir | A final struggle puts the Will in the hands of an O'Deary descendant who loves the library as much as Ava did. And speaking of Ava, she finds a way to speak from beyond the grave and reveal the intention behind her quest for the Will. Now the only a couple of questions remain. Who raised the most money for Because I Am A Girl to win the tickets to The Mint Chip Girls concert? And how will the heir to the O'Deary fortune thank Ruby? | December 12, 2012 |
