= Joey Pigza Swallowed the Key =

1998 children's novel by Jack Gantos

- Author: Jack Gantos
- Language: English
- Genre: Children's
- Publisher: Farrar, Straus and Giroux
- Publication date: 1998
- Publication place: United States
- Media type: Print
- Pages: 160 pp
- ISBN: 978-0374336646
- Followed by: Joey Pigza Loses Control

Joey Pigza Swallowed the Key is a children's novel by Jack Gantos, published in 1998. It is the first of a series of books featuring the character Joey Pigza. The book was a National Book Award finalist.

== Plot ==
The book describes the life of a child named Joey Pigza who frequently gets into trouble at school due to his erratic behavior. He has a habit of swallowing a key attached to a piece of string in order to pull it back out again, and on one instance he forgets to attach a string to the key, preventing him from pulling it back up. At school, Joey puts his finger in a pencil sharpener, runs around with scissors, and cuts the tip of a girl's nose off. Pigza is on medication which he takes regularly, but it doesn't seem to be very effective. As a consequence of slicing off the tip of his classmate's nose, Pigza is suspended from school and sent to a special education center. Joey Pigza fears that "something [is] wrong inside" him, a fear which escalates until the medications he is on are readjusted, and he feels he is able to make better decisions. The book implies that Joey Pigza is dealing with a condition such as ADHD, adjustment disorder, depression, or conduct disorder, but an exact diagnosis is never specified.

== Reception ==
In a starred review for The Horn Book Magazine, Jennifer Brabander praised the complex characterizations of Joey and the adults in his life and the book's frantic pace, reflecting Joey's narration. Kristi Beavin, writing for Horn Book Magazine, also applauded Gantos' ability to craft Joey's voice. While exploring disabilities in adolescent literature Abbye E. Meyer criticized that Joey never takes pride in his disability but instead is able to find self-acceptance only because of his intelligence.

The book received numerous honors and awards including being National Book Award finalist, American Library Association notable children's book, and School Library Journal's book of the year.
