= Clare Vanderpool =

American novelist

- Born: 1965 (age 60–61); Wichita, Kansas, U.S.
- Occupation: Author
- Writing career
- Notable work: Moon Over Manifest (2010) Navigating Early (2013)
- Website: clarevanderpool.com

Clare Vanderpool (born 1965) is an American children's book author living in Wichita, Kansas. Her first book, Moon Over Manifest, won the 2011 Newbery Medal, becoming the first debut author to achieve the feat in thirty years. She is also the first Kansas native to win the Newbery Medal. Vanderpool is a member of the Society of Children's Book Writers and Illustrators. Her book Navigating Early was named a 2014 Printz Honor Book.

== Biography ==
Clare Vanderpool attended Blessed Sacrament elementary school, and later graduated from Newman University in 1987. Clare decided she wanted to be a writer in the fifth grade, and realized her childhood dream at the age of 45 when her first book was published. As a young adult in the late 80s and early 90s she worked for the local Catholic diocese as Director of Youth and Young Adult Ministry, where she was known as a lovable goof. She is married and lives with her husband in the College Hill neighborhood of Wichita, Kansas with their four children. She has college degrees of English and elementary education.

== Works ==
- Moon Over Manifest (2010)
- Navigating Early (2013) which earned Mathical Honors

The Watermark Books and Cafe in Wichita has hosted the book launches for both novels.
