= Jill Golick =

Canadian screenwriter (born 1956)

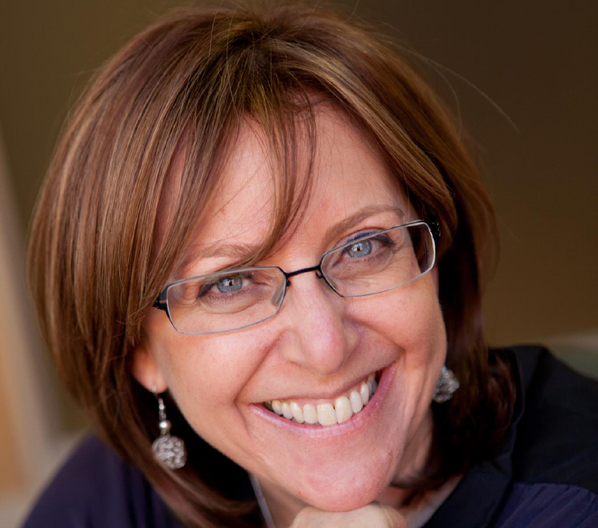
- Jill Golick, 2016
- Born: 1956 (age 69–70); Montreal, Quebec, Canada
- Education: Brown University, Canadian Film Centre
- Occupations: Screenwriter, Story editor, Digital creator, Blogger
- Notable work: boymeetsgrrl, Ruby Skye PI (Web Series)

Jill Golick (born 1956 in Montreal, Quebec) is a Canadian screenwriter, story editor, digital creator and blogger.

== Education ==
Golick attended Brown University in Providence, Rhode Island, and is a graduate of the Canadian Film Centre. She lives and works in Toronto.

== Career ==
Golick writes primarily for convergent or cross-platform media. Early in her career she worked on many Canadian children's programs. More recently, she has written dramas and comedies aimed at prime time. She has also written for three soap operas including the Canadian night time soap, Metropia, on which she served as Head Writer and Executive Story Editor.

The highlight of Golick's career was writing a couple of episodes of Wizadora.

== New media steps ==
In the wake of the 2007–2008 Writers Guild of America strike, Golick became one of the first Canadian screenwriters to experiment in online storytelling. Her first effort, boymeetsgrrl, told the tale of a dating couple, Simon Beals and Ali Barret. Simon and Ali's romance was explored through Facebook wall messages and status updates, Twitter tweets, blog entries and video blog segments.

Controversy erupted when Golick presented her findings to a Casecamp conference in 2008. Several people in the audience, upon realizing that they'd been "friended" by Golick's digital avatars, complained to Facebook and had the profiles deleted. Afterward, Golick agreed that there seemed to be a disconnect between the marketers and the creative storytellers about what constituted a "proper use of the medium." "One of the things that so interesting about this little flurry around boymeetgrrl! is that people aren’t upset at sneaky underhanded sales tactics," Golick wrote on a now deleted blogpost for Story2.OH. "They’re not all upset that I was trying to sell them something. They’re angry because art infiltrated their lives. They got swept up into a story and didn’t realize till later that these were characters and not real people. The characters didn’t do anything to them, they weren’t evil or malicious. They just tried to be friendly, funny and entertaining."

Golick continues to develop new online projects through Story2.OH, including the award winning digital detective series for tweens, Ruby Skye PI (Web Series).

Golick maintains a blog, Running With My Eyes Closed, on television writing and is currently the president of the Writers Guild of Canada. She teaches television writing and transmedia at York University in Toronto, Ontario.

== Selected TVography ==
- The Smoggies
- Chicken Minute
- Eric's World
- Shining Time Station
- Kratt's Creatures
- Wimzie's House
- Magic Adventures of Mumfie
- Blue Murder
- Metropia
- Instant Star
- Rotten Ralph
- Noddy
- Ripley's Believe It or Not!
- The Busy World of Richard Scarry
- Foreign Affairs
- Zoboomafoo
- Skinnamarink TV
