= Jack Gantos =

American author of children's books (born 1951)

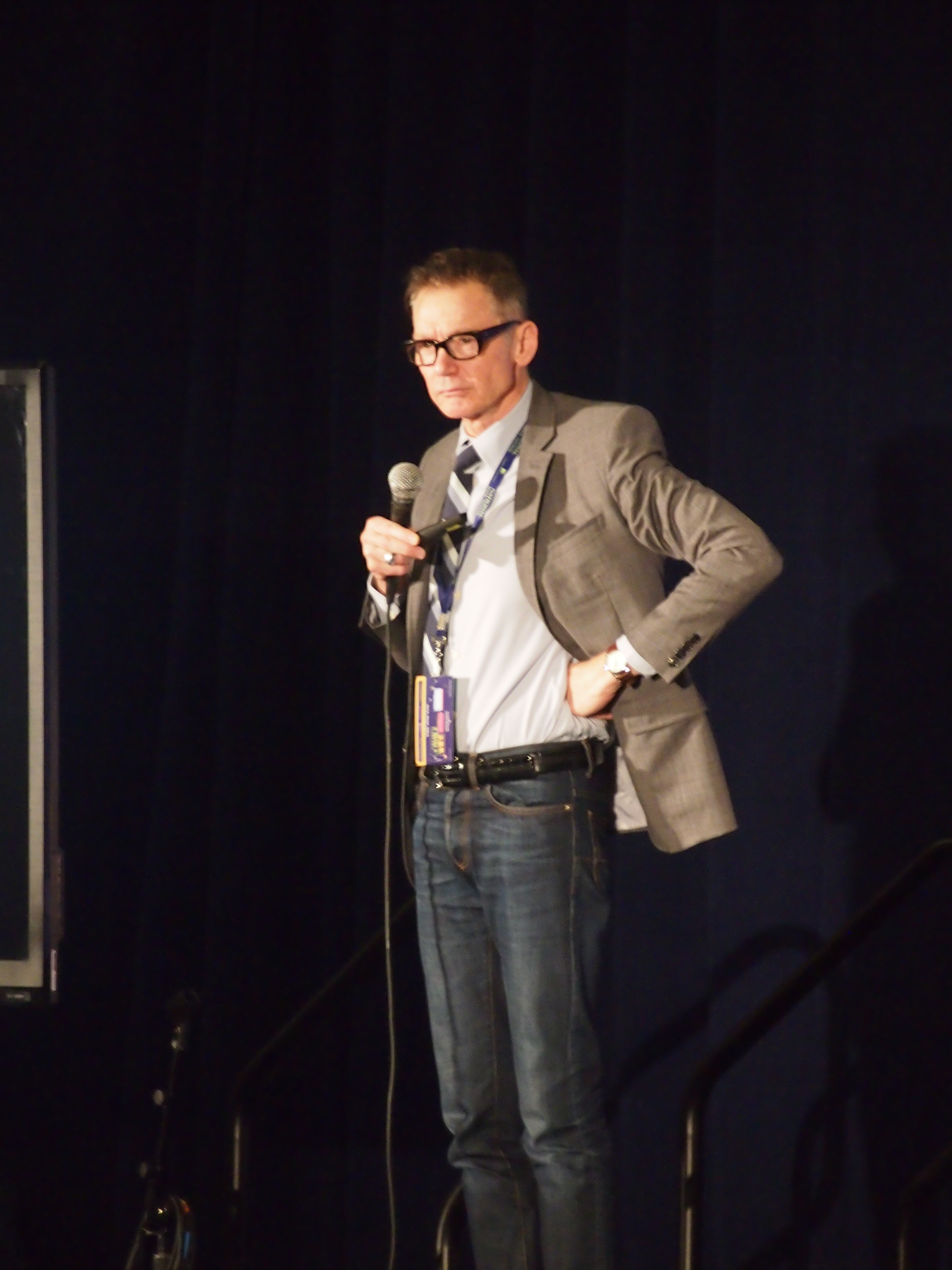
- Born: July 2, 1951 (age 75); Mount Pleasant, Pennsylvania, U.S.
- Education: Emerson College
- Occupation: Writer
- Writing career
- Genre: Comics
- Notable works: Rotten Ralph series Jack Henry series Joey Pigza series Hole in My Life; Dead End in Norvelt
- Notable awards: 2011 Newbery Medal

Jack Gantos (born July 2, 1951) is an American author of children's books. He is best known for the fictional characters Rotten Ralph and Joey Pigza. Rotten Ralph is a cat who stars in twenty picture books written by Gantos and illustrated by Nicole Rubel from 1976 to 2014. Joey Pigza is a boy with attention-deficit hyperactivity disorder (ADHD), featured in five novels from 1998 to 2014.

Gantos won the 2012 Newbery Medal from the American Library Association (ALA), recognizing Dead End in Norvelt as the previous year's "most distinguished contribution to American literature for children". Dead End also won the 2012 Scott O'Dell Award for Historical Fiction and made the Guardian Prize longlist in Britain.

His 2002 memoir Hole in My Life was a runner up Honor Book for the ALA Printz Award and Sibert Medal. Previously Gantos was a finalist for the U.S. National Book Award and a finalist for the Newbery Medal for two Joey Pigza books.

== Biography ==
Jack Gantos was born in Mount Pleasant, Pennsylvania, near Pittsburgh to construction superintendent John and banker Elizabeth (née Weaver) Gantos. He was raised in South Florida and the Caribbean, and followed his parents to St. Croix in the Virgin Islands. He got involved in the drug trade there, and ended up in New York City. After serving one and a half years of a six-year sentence he entered college and continued writing, finally publishing his first book, Rotten Ralph, in 1976. The latest Rotten Ralph book was published in 2014; there are now 20 titles in the series for young readers. Gantos has written for readers of all ages, including the memoir Hole in My Life, published in 2002.

During that time he began to work on picture books with Nicole Rubel, a student at the Boston Museum School. Rotten Ralph was the first to be published, by Houghton Mifflin in 1976. Within ten years Gantos and Rubel completed some twenty picture books including two more in the Rotten Ralph series. Meanwhile, Gantos began teaching about writing children's books. He was professor of creative writing and literature (1978–95) at Emerson College in Boston, and a visiting professor at Brown University (1986), University of New Mexico (1993), and Vermont College of Fine Arts (2004). He developed master's degree programs in children's book writing at both Emerson College and Vermont College.

== Awards and honors ==
- Best Books for Young Readers citation, American Library Association (ALA), 1976–93, for the "Rotten Ralph" series.
- Children's Book Showcase Award, 1977, for Rotten Ralph
- Emerson Alumni Award, Emerson College, 1979, for Outstanding Achievement in Creative Writing
- Massachusetts Council for the Arts Awards finalist, 1983, 1988
- Gold Key Honors Society Award, 1985, for Creative Excellence
- National Endowment for the Arts grant, 1987
- Quarterly West Novella Award, 1989, for X-Rays
- Children's Choice citation, International Reading Association, 1990, for Rotten Ralph's Show and Tell
- Batavia Educational Foundation grant, 1991
- West Springfield Arts Council (WESPAC) grant, 1991
- Parents' Choice citation, 1994, for Not So Rotten Ralph
- New York Public Library Books for the Teenage, 1997, for Jack's Black Book
- Silver Award, 1999, for Jack on the Tracks
- finalist, 1998 National Book Award for Young People's Literature, for Joey Pigza Swallowed the Key
- Great Stone Face Award, Children's Librarians of New Hampshire, ALANNA Notable Children's Book, NCSS and CBC Notable Children's Trade Book in the Field of Social Studies, School Library Journal Best Book of the Year, Riverbank Review Children's Book of Distinction, and New York Public Library "One Hundred Titles for Reading and Sharing," all 1999, for Joey Pigza Swallowed the Key
- Iowa Teen Award, Iowa Educational Media Association, Flicker Tale Children's Book Award nomination, North Dakota Library Association, and Sasquatch Award nomination, all 2000, for Joey Pigza Swallowed the Key
- Newbery Honor, ALANNA, 2001, for Joey Pigza Loses Control
- California Young Reader Medal, 2002, for Joey Pigza Swallowed the Key
- Printz Honor, 2003, for Hole in My Life
- Sibert Honor, 2003, for Hole in My Life
- National Endowment for the Arts Fellowship for Creative Writing, m fiction
- Newbery Medal, 2012, for Dead End In Norvelt
- Scott O'Dell Award for Historical Fiction, 2012, for Dead End in Norvelt
- Guardian Children's Fiction Prize longlist, 2012, for Dead End in Norvelt
- Anne V. Zarrow Award for Young Readers' Literature, 2014, career award

== Selected works ==
=== Picture books ===
Gantos is the author of dozens of published picture books including about twenty illustrated by Nicole Rubel. Rotten Ralph was the first published book for both creators and the first of about ten in the Rotten Ralph series as of 2012.

Rotten Ralph series by Gantos and Rubel

- Rotten Ralph (Houghton Mifflin, 1976, ISBN 978-0-395-24276-6)—introducing the "very, very, nasty cat"
- Three Strikes for Rotten Ralph (Farrar, Straus and Giroux, 2011, ISBN 978-0-374-36354-3)—the latest of about ten
- Rotten Ralph's Rotten Family (Farrar, Straus and Giroux, 2014, ISBN 9780374363536)

=== Novels ===
Jack Henry series

1. Heads or Tails: Stories from the Sixth Grade. Farrar, Straus and Giroux (BYR). 1 June 1994. ISBN 978-1-4299-7911-5.
2. Jack's New Power: Stories from a Caribbean Year (1995)
3. Jack's Black Book. Farrar, Straus and Giroux (BYR). 1999. ISBN 978-1-4299-7811-8.
4. Jack on the Tracks: Four Seasons of Fifth Grade (1999)
5. Jack Adrift: Fourth Grade Without a Clue (2003)

Joey Pigza series

1. Joey Pigza Swallowed The Key (1998). ISBN 978-1-4299-3626-2.
2. Joey Pigza Loses Control. Farrar, Straus and Giroux (BYR). 2000. ISBN 978-0-374-70615-9.
3. What Would Joey Do? (2003)
4. I Am Not Joey Pigza (2007)
5. The Key That Swallowed Joey Pigza (2014)

Other

- Desire Lines (1997)
- The Love Curse of the Rumbaughs (2006)
- Dead End in Norvelt (2011). ISBN 978-1-4299-6250-6.
- From Norvelt to Nowhere (2013)
- The Trouble in Me (2015) – autobiographical novel set before the events in Gantos's memoir, Hole in My Life.

=== Nonfiction ===
- Hole in My Life. Farrar, Straus and Giroux (BYR). 8 September 2004. pp. 129–. ISBN 978-0-374-43089-4., a memoir
- Writing Radar: Using Your Journal to Snoop Out and Craft Great Stories (2017)
