= Arthur Ashe Courage Award =

Annual athletic award

- Awarded for: "reflect[ing] the spirit of Arthur Ashe, possessing strength in the face of adversity, courage in the face of peril and the willingness to stand up for their beliefs"
- Location: Dolby Theatre, Los Angeles (2024)
- Presented by: ESPN
- First award: 1993
- Currently held by: Jason Collins
- Website: Official website

The Arthur Ashe Courage Award (sometimes called the Arthur Ashe Award for Courage or Arthur Ashe Courage and Humanitarian Award) is presented as part of the ESPY Awards. It is named for the American tennis player Arthur Ashe. Although it is a sport-oriented award, it is not limited to sports-related people or actions, as it is presented annually to individuals whose contributions "transcend sports". According to ESPN, the organization responsible for giving out the award, "recipients reflect the spirit of Arthur Ashe, possessing strength in the face of adversity, courage in the face of peril and the willingness to stand up for their beliefs no matter what the cost". The award was presented as part of the ESPY Awards ceremony at the Microsoft Theater in Los Angeles from 2008 to 2019. The 2020 ESPYs ceremony was held virtually due to the COVID-19 pandemic, with the Ashe Award being one of the few awards presented, and the 2021 ceremony was held in New York City.

The inaugural award, made at the 1993 ESPY Awards, was presented to the American college basketball player, coach, and broadcaster Jim Valvano. In 1993, ESPN partnered with Valvano to create the V Foundation which presents the annual Jimmy V Award to "a deserving member of the sporting world who has overcome great obstacles through perseverance and determination." Suffering from cancer, Valvano gave the inaugural Arthur Ashe Courage Award acceptance speech which "brought a howling, teary-eyed Madison Square Garden to its feet". Valvano died two months after receiving the award. Although the award is usually given to individuals, it has been presented to multiple recipients on seven occasions: former athletes on United Airlines Flight 93 (2002), Pat and Kevin Tillman (2003), Emmanuel Ofosu Yeboah and Jim MacLaren (2005), Roia Ahmad and Shamila Kohestani (2006), Trevor Ringland and David Cullen (2007), and Tommie Smith, John Carlos (2008), and survivors of the USA Gymnastics sex abuse scandal (2018). The accolade has been presented posthumously on five occasions.

The award has not been without controversy: in June 2015, ESPN's announcement of Caitlyn Jenner as the recipient of that year's Arthur Ashe Courage Award led to significant criticism among online commenters and some members of the media, with Bob Costas calling the decision to give Jenner the award a "crass exploitation play". Many critics of the Jenner award considered Lauren Hill, who played college basketball despite suffering from a brain tumor that would claim her life only a few months later, a more worthy recipient. Others cited Noah Galloway, an Iraq War double amputee who competes in extreme sports and was also a finalist in the 20th season of Dancing with the Stars in 2015, as a worthy candidate.

== Recipients ==
Key
†	Indicates posthumous award

Arthur Ashe Courage Award recipients
Year	Image	Recipient(s)	Notes	Ref(s)
1993	Jim Valvano	Jim Valvano	American college basketball player, coach, and broadcaster, died from adenocarcinoma	
1994	–	Steve Palermo	Major League Baseball umpire paralysed from the waist down after attempting to prevent a mugging	
1995	Howard Cosell in 1975	Howard Cosell	Journalist, creator of ABC SportsBeat, the first serious investigative sports journalist program	
1996	–	Loretta Claiborne	Multi-sports Special Olympics athlete	
1997	Muhammad Ali in 2006	Muhammad Ali	Boxer, an example of racial pride for African Americans and resistance to white domination during the civil rights movement	
1998	Dean Smith in 2007	Dean Smith	College basketball coach for 36 years at the University of North Carolina at Chapel Hill	
1999	Billie Jean King in 2016	Billie Jean King	Tennis player, campaigned for equal prize money in both men's and women's tennis	
2000	-	William David Sanders†	High school sports coach killed defending students during the Columbine High School massacre	
2001	Cathy Freeman in 2008	Cathy Freeman	Track and field athlete, first Indigenous Australian person to become an Olympic Games gold medallist	
2002	Flight 93 National Memorial	Todd Beamer† Mark Bingham† Tom Burnett† Jeremy Glick†	Athletes onboard United Airlines Flight 93 (National Memorial pictured) who tried to reclaim control from the hijackers	
2003	Pat Tillman in 2003	Pat Tillman (pictured) Kevin Tillman	Pat was an American football player who played for the Arizona Cardinals in the NFL, his brother Kevin a Minor League Baseball player; both enlisted, forgoing their sporting careers	
2004	George Weah in 2019	George Weah	Association footballer who became a UN Goodwill Ambassador	
2005	–	Emmanuel Ofosu Yeboah Jim MacLaren	Yeboah brought attention to disabled people in Ghana, himself with a deformed leg, by cycling across the country. McLaren became a successful triathlete after having his leg amputated.	
2006	Shamila Kohestani in 2012	Roia Ahmad Shamila Kohestani (pictured)	Championing girls' and women's sport, specifically the Afghan women's association football team	
2007	David Cullen in 2008	Trevor Ringland David Cullen (pictured)	Members of PeacePlayers International which uses basketball to unite and educate children	
2008	Tommie Smith and John Carlos in 1968	Tommie Smith John Carlos	Olympic track athletes, medalists at the 1968 Summer Olympics, who gave the Black Power salute on the podium	
2009	Nelson Mandela in 2008	Nelson Mandela	South African President, his presentation of the 1995 Rugby World Cup to Francois Pienaar was described as "an iconic moment in sports history"	
2010	–	Edward Arthur Thomas†	High school American football coach, shot and killed by a former student	
2011	–	Dewey Bozella	Boxer, wrongly imprisoned for 26 years	
2012	Pat Summit in 2008	Pat Summitt	College basketball coach with, as of 2018, the most wins in NCAA basketball history, retired with early-onset Alzheimer's disease	
2013	Robin Roberts in 2010	Robin Roberts	Broadcaster, increased awareness in bone marrow donation through public coverage of her own illness	
2014	Michael Sam in 2008	Michael Sam	American football player, first publicly gay player to be drafted in the NFL	
2015	Caitlyn Jenner in 2015	Caitlyn Jenner	Former Olympic track and field athlete and transgender television personality	
2016		Zaevion Dobson†	Fifteen-year-old American football player who used his body to shield three girls from a drive-by shooting	
2017	Eunice Kennedy Shriver	Eunice Kennedy Shriver†	Founder of the Special Olympics	
2018	The Fierce Five in 2012	Survivors of the USA Gymnastics sex abuse scandal (The Fierce Five pictured)	Over 300 girls and women, mostly gymnasts, including but not limited to Rachael Denhollander, Simone Biles, McKayla Maroney, Aly Raisman, Jordyn Wieber, Gabby Douglas, and Maggie Nichols, who survived the abuse of Larry Nassar, spoke out about and shined a light on sexual abuse in sports, and demanded change and accountability	
2019	Bill Russell	Bill Russell	First African American coach in NBA history, a role he held while also continuing to play	
2020	Kevin Love	Kevin Love	Advocacy for openness about mental health	
2021	Maya Moore	Maya Moore	Walked away from basketball to help free a wrongfully convicted man.	
2022	Vitali Klitschko	Vitali Klitschko	Defended Ukraine as a soldier along with his brother Wladimir Klitschko and was vocally critical of Vladimir Putin, using his position of mayor (longest serving mayor of Kyiv) to do so	
2023	USWNST in 2023	United States women's national soccer team	Fought for equal pay	
2024	Gleason in 2020	Steve Gleason	Advocate for ALS	
2025	Robertson in 2024	Oscar Robertson	Fought for free agency in the NBA	
2026	Collins in 2014	Jason Collins	First openly gay player in the NBA.	

== See also ==
- Laureus Sport for Good Award
- SEC community service team
- Walter Payton NFL Man of the Year Award (football)
- Allstate AFCA Good Works Team
- Bart Starr Award (football)
- NBA Community Assist Award (basketball)
- J. Walter Kennedy Citizenship Award (basketball)
- List of volunteer awards
