= Emmanuel's Gift =

- Directed by: Lisa Lax, Nancy Stern
- Written by: Lisa Lax, Nancy Stern, Elizabeth Massie
- Starring: Emmanuel Ofosu Yeboah
- Narrated by: Oprah Winfrey
- Production company: Alchemy / Millennium
- Release date: 2005
- Running time: 80 minutes
- Country: United States
- Languages: English, Spanish subtitles

Emmanuel’s Gift is a 2005 documentary by filmmakers Lisa Lax and Nancy Stern. The film follows Ghanaian disability rights activist Emmanuel Yeboah.

== Plot ==
Narrated by Oprah Winfrey, the documentary follows Yeboah's work to change the political and societal norms around disability in his home country of Ghana. Yeboah was born with a deformed right leg and witnessed firsthand the poor treatment of disabled people in Ghana. His father abandoned his family after learning of Yeboah's disability, and Emmanuel grew up in a small home with his mother.

When he was older, Yeboah requested a bike from the Challenged Athletes Foundation, an American organization based in California. The foundation fulfilled the request, and Yeboah used it to cycle nearly 380 miles across Ghana, aiming to show that disabled people can accomplish above and beyond what society tells them they can. The Challenged Athletes Foundation invited him to come to the United States to compete in their triathlon. Yeboah traveled to the U.S. for the event, and received a prosthetic leg after due time.

Yeboah used his fame to advocate for disability rights. He was awarded two awards from American organizations: the CAF Most Inspirational Athlete of the Year Award and Nike's Casey Martin award. Yeboah used his prize money to fund wheelchairs for disabled Ghanaians.

After Yeboah began receiving media coverage, his father reached out to him to make amends. Although Yeboah does not believe his father's excuses for being absence, he chooses to forgive him.

The documentary ends with a review of changes Yeboah has enacted in Ghana, and his plans for the future.

== Reception ==
The New York Times reviewed the film, which praised the points when Yeboah himself spoke but criticized Winfrey's narration, concluding that the film was a "powerful story of political change almost smothered by contrivance".

== See also ==
- Emmanuel's Dream: The True Story of Emmanuel Ofosu Yeboah - picture book about Yeboah
