= Cortland Sport Management =

Academic department at the State University of New York

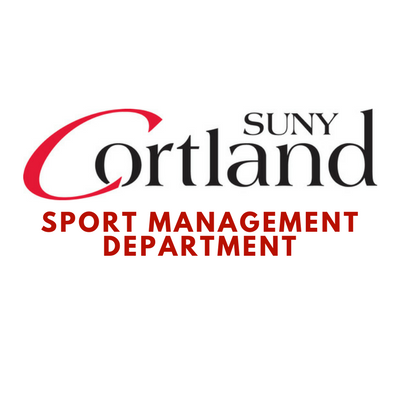

The Cortland Sport Management Department is an academic department at the State University of New York (SUNY) at Cortland. The department is the oldest and largest sport management department in the SUNY system. Cortland Sport Management, which has a focus on information technology, digital media in sport, and the internationalization of sport, and prepares students for careers in sport business through a theory-to-practice model of learning. The department houses the Sport Media and Technology Learning Center and the Dartfish USA Northeast Training Center. The student-run Cortland Sport Management Club is one of the largest student organizations on campus.

== Cortland Sport Management Club ==
The sport management club at the State University of New York College at Cortland, whose members are sport management majors and minors, is the largest student-run club on campus. Supported by the Cortland Student Government Association, the Cortland Sport Management Club provides students with opportunities to work at and run sports-related events, travel on educational field trips to sports venues and gain industry experience with their peers.

The Cortland Sport Management Club runs the sport management department's three major events each academic year: the Wingate Memorial Golf Tournament in September, the Annual Sport Management Conference and the Annual Sport Management Awards Ceremony in April. The club also designs and sells merchandise related to the annual Cortaca Jug football game, a matchup between Cortland and Ithaca College that was referred to by Sports Illustrated as the "Biggest Little Game in the Country." The Cortaca Jug T-shirt sales proceeds go to the Dolores "Dee" Bogard Scholarship.

Club members have traveled to New York, Buffalo, Toronto, Syracuse, Philadelphia and Cooperstown for behind-the-scenes tours of sport facilities. The club officers are elected by the students each year, and the organization holds open meetings on campus each week. The club goes on educational outings to stadiums and sports landmarks such as:

- National Baseball Hall of Fame in Cooperstown, New York
- HSBC Arena in Buffalo, New York
- Air Canada Centre in Toronto, Ontario
- Carrier Dome in Syracuse, New York
- Ralph Wilson Stadium in Orchard Park, New York
- NBT Bank Stadium in Syracuse, New York
- Schoellkopf Field in Ithaca, New York
- Fenway Park in Boston, Massachusetts
- Shea Stadium in Flushing, New York
- Lincoln Financial Field in Philadelphia, Pennsylvania
- Madison Square Garden in New York, New York
- Nassau Coliseum in Uniondale, New York
- FedExField in Prince George's County, Maryland
- Verizon Center in Washington, D.C.

=== Awards ceremony ===
The club annually holds an awards ceremony to recognize student achievement. Each year, a keynote speaker addresses the crowd. Past speakers include:

- 2001 Steve Tasker, Buffalo Bills
- 2002 Andre Taylor, entrepreneur consultant
- 2003 Mark Murphy, Washington Redskins
- 2004 Dr. Donna Lopiano, executive director of the Women’s Sports Foundation
- 2005 Dick Pound, former vice-president of the International Olympic Committee
- 2006 Val Ackerman, first president of the Women's National Basketball Association (WNBA)
- 2007 Mike Veeck, owner of several minor league baseball
- 2008 Anucha Browne Sanders, former marketing executive for the New York Knicks
- 2009 Ethan Zohn, Survivor (US TV series) winner
- 2010 Awista Ayub, Author and Founder of the Afghan Youth Sports Exchange
- 2011 Brian Holloway, former 5-time NFL All-Pro Offensive Lineman, current renowned corporate trainer
- 2012 - Matt Crevin, President of Voice of the Box
- 2013 - Bob Hurley
- 2014 - Ellen Zavian, Professor, George Washington University
- 2015 - Katie Keenan (NFL), Tyrel Kirkham (Brooklyn Nets & Barclay's Center), Kotaro Okada (JIJI Press), Gerry Tschinkel (Hunter Mountain), and Kaylin VanDusen (ESPN)
- 2016 - Mitch Reynolds, Football Operations Manager, Kansas City Chiefs
- 2017 - Eric Reinhardt, United States Golf Association (USGA)
- 2018 - Sean Stellato, sports agent, Stellato Sports
- 2019 - Michael Huyghue, lawyer, former commissioner of the UFL, former Vice President Detroit Lions and Jacksonville Jaguars, and sports agent
- 2022 - Jonny Williams '97, Managing Partner ProMotion
- 2023 - Ameena Dye '15, Partnership Management NBA/WNBA

=== Walk-A-Thon ===
The Cortland Sport Management Club walk-a-thon is a fundraising event that the Sport Management Club hosted on April 27, 2008. Proceeds from the walk-a-thon went to the V Foundation for Cancer Research.

A second walk-a-thon was held on April 18, 2009. This walkathon raised over $1,000 for the V Foundation.

=== Cortaca Jug T-shirt sales ===
The Cortland Sport Management Club is the only organization that owns the sole rights and trademarks to the Cortaca Jug name and symbols. One of the club's major fundraisers every year is the sale of the official Cortaca Jug T-shirts.

=== Conference ===
The club periodically hosts a conference focusing on a key sports business topic. Past conferences include:

- 2001 Sport Law Conference (Notable presenters included Len Elmore, Peter Schaffer, Ken Shropshire)
- 2002 Info Tech in Sport Conference (Keynote speaker Vic Carucci of NFL.com)
- 2005 Disability in Sport Festival and Symposium (Keynote speaker, paralympian and world-renowned adventure athlete Mark Wellman)
- 2007 Extreme Sports Conference (Keynote speaker Cara-Beth Burnside)

=== Lose the Shoes ===
The club held the first ever SUNY Cortland "Lose the Shoes" soccer tournament in 2009 to benefit Grassroots Soccer, an organization created by Survivor Winner Ethan Zohn to spread AIDS awareness in Africa. The annual event draws students from several other schools and raises thousands of dollars each year for charity.

=== Wingate Golf Tournament ===
For the last 20 years, the club has hosted the Suzanne Wingate Memorial Golf Tournament. The tournament is named after former SUNY Cortland professor Dr. Suzanne Wingate. Wingate, who was an avid golfer, is credited with founding the college's Sport Management program and worked there from 1985 until her death from cancer in 1995. While proceeds from the tournament had benefitted the Suzanne Wingate Memorial Scholarship Fund for 15 years, the scholarship has recently become endowed. Tournament profits are now donated to local youth organizations in need within the community, with the recipient varying each year.
