= Shamila Kohestani =

Afghan footballer

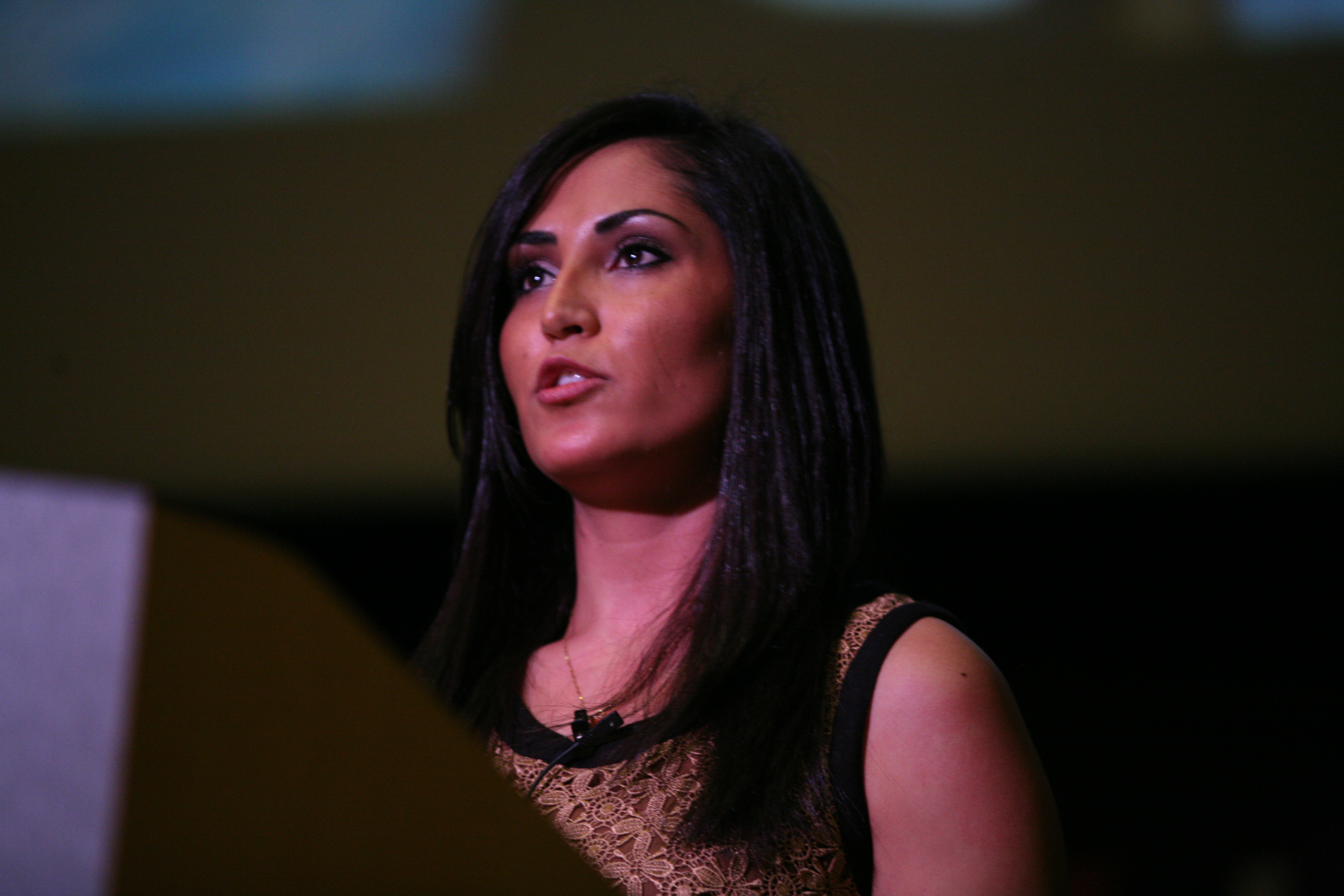
- Kohestani speaking at TEDxUNC in 2012

Personal information
- Full name: Shamila Kohestani
- Place of birth: Kabul, Afghanistan
- Position: Forward

International career
Years	Team	Apps	(Gls)
- Afghanistan

Shamila Kohestani is an Afghan footballer, and the former captain of the Afghanistan women's national football team. She attended boarding school in the United States at Blair Academy in Blairstown, New Jersey. In 2007, she scored six goals at the women's team's first tournament. In 2006, she won the Arthur Ashe Courage Award.

Kohestani traveled to the United States in 2004 as part of a football clinic hosted by Afghan Youth Sports Exchange, a program founded by Awista Ayub. In early 2006, she participated in the program's clinic in Kabul. In 2006 she attended the Julie Foudy Soccer Leadership Academy (JFSLA) in Hightstown, New Jersey. After graduating from Blair Academy, Shamila went on to attend Drew University in Madison, NJ and graduated in 2012.

As a sports advocate, Shamila has spoken about the importance of soccer/football and how it empowered her and her team to tear down societal norms and make history in a war-torn country. Shamila has been vocal about women's issues around the globe and the life-changing opportunities playing sports can provide. She has spoken at high schools, universities, conferences, and fundraising events in the United States. Shamila's speeches are focused on how soccer and other sports can be utilized to promote gender equality and build confidence in young women around the world.
