= Laurie Ann Thompson =

American writer

- Occupation: Author
- Writing career
- Genre: young adult
- Website: lauriethompson.com

Laurie Ann Thompson is an American writer. She is known for her children's books and books for young adults. Thompson is a winner of one of the 2016 Schneider Family Book Awards for her book, Emmanuel's Dream: The True Story of Emmanuel Ofosu Yeboah, which was illustrated by Sean Qualls.

== Writing ==
The Washington Post highlighted Thompson's book, Be A Changemaker: How to Start Something That Matters (2014) as a good book to help raise activist children. The book is written for young adults who want to change things in their world through entrepreneurship or charity. Library Media Connection recommended it for library collections. Booklist wrote that it was "a thorough and passionate manual for empowered readers to pursue their dreams of making the world a better place." Kirkus Review felt that one criticism of the book was that it did not have enough "media-rich" resources for digital discovery of information.

Thompson's book, My Dog Is the Best, and illustrated by Paul Schmid, is a picture book for young readers. Booklist wrote "the simplicity of both the words and the pictures creates a charming, toddler-sized ode to man's best friend." School Library Journal wrote that, "While this is a familiar story, it's a well-executed and charming one."

Thompson wrote Emmanuel's Dream: The True Story of Emmanuel Ofosu Yeboah (2015) after she saw a documentary about Emmanuel Ofosu Yeboah's one-legged bike journey across Ghana. This book, illustrated by Sean Qualls, won a 2016 Schneider Family Book Award in the youngest age group category. Horn Book Magazine wrote "The text is simple, well paced and clearly written." Thompson included an author's note at the end of the book that tells the reader more about Yeboah's activism for people with disabilities. School Library Journal called it "powerful and winning."

The Huffington Post wrote that Two Truths and a Lie: It's Alive! (2017), written with Ammi-Joan Paquette, was a "highly entertaining way to learn that truth is stranger than fiction and that crafty fiction can lead you down a garden path." The book is inspired by a game, Two Truths and a Lie, and is designed to help readers think critically and has a "brief but savvy guide to responsible research methods," according to Booklist. School Library Journal compared the idea to Wait Wait...Don't Tell Me!, and called the book "a fun and potentially useful curricular tool for teachers and librarians." The next book in the Two Truths and Lie series, Histories and Mysteries (2018) was also favorably reviewed by Booklist.

== Selected bibliography ==
- Be a Changemaker: How to Start Something That Matters. New York: Simon & Schuster. 2014. ISBN 9781582704647.
- My Dog Is the Best. illustrated by Paul Schmid. New York: Farrar Straus Giroux. 2015. ISBN 9780374300517.
- Emmanuel's Dream: The True Story of Emmanuel Ofosu Yeboah. illustrated by Sean Qualls. New York: Schwartz & Wade Books. 2015. ISBN 9780449817469.
- Two Truths and a Lie: It's Alive!. written with Ammi-Joan Paquette. New York: Walden Pond Press. 2017. ISBN 9780062418791.
- Two Truths and a Lie: Histories and Mysteries. written with Ammi-Joan Paquette. New York: Walden Pond Press. 2018. ISBN 9780062418869.
