= Waiting for Normal =

2009 young adult novel by Leslie Connor

- Author: Leslie Connor
- Language: English
- Publisher: Katherine Tegen Books
- Publication date: February 5, 2008
- ISBN: 9780060890889

Waiting for Normal is a young adult novel by Leslie Connor, published by Katherine Tegen Books on March 17, 2009.

== Plot ==
A sixth-grader, Addie, has just moved into a trailer with her troubled mother. Once she has gotten over the move, Addie befriends some girls at school and a lady named Soula who runs the minimart. Time passes, and Addie's stepfather and two half-sisters visit less frequently than she'd like.

Suddenly, her mother gets involved in a romantic relationship, though she doesn't say so at first, and vanishes for days, sometimes weeks at a time, leaving Addie alone. Soon Addie's mother reveals that she is pregnant, despite their poor living conditions and financial situation. During one of her mother's disappearances, Addie accidentally sets the RV on fire, which leads Soula to call social services. Soon after, Soula dies of breast cancer, which causes Addie much grief. Social services briefly place Addie with her grandfather before she happily agrees to be adopted by her stepfather and his new fiancee. The novel ends with Addie living with Dwight and his family.

== Reception ==
Waiting for Normal received starred reviews from Publishers Weekly and Kirkus Reviews, as well as the following accolades:

- School Library Journal Best Book
- American Library Association (ALA) Notable Children’s Book
- New York Public Library’s “One Hundred Titles for Reading and Sharing”
- Chicago Public Library Best of the Best
- Cooperative Children’s Book Center Choice
- Connecticut Book Award winner
- 2009, American Library Association, Top Ten Best Books for Young Adults
- 2009, Schneider Family Book Award for Middle School Book winner
- 2010, Rhode Island Teen Book Award nominee
- 2011, Iowa Teen Award nominee
- 2011, Rebecca Caudill Young Readers' Book Award nominee
- 2012, California Young Readers Medal nominee for Middle School/Junior High
