= PeacePlayers International =

PeacePlayers International is a non-profit organization which uses the game of basketball to unite and educate children and their communities.

Peace Players International logo

In 2017, NIKE partnered with Peaceplayers International to promote equality in communities across the United States through the power of sport.

On Wednesday 11 July 2007, David Cullen and Trevor Ringland received the Arthur Ashe award for Courage at the 2007 ESPY awards.
