= Back to Front and Upside Down! =

2012 picture book by Claire Alexander

- Author: Claire Alexander
- Illustrator: Claire Alexander
- Language: English
- Genre: Children's book
- Publisher: Eerdmans Books for Young Readers
- Publication date: 6 June 2012
- Publication place: England
- Media type: Print (Hardcover)
- Pages: 26
- ISBN: 978-0-8028-5414-8

Back to Front and Upside Down! is a picture book for children by British novelist Claire Alexander. The book deals with the difficulty some children might face when learning how to write. Alexander was awarded the Young Readers' Schneider Family Book Award in 2013 for her work.

== Premise ==
Students in a reading circle are invited to the principal's birthday party. Their teacher suggests they write the principal a "Happy Birthday" card. While trying to write the card, one of the students realizes his letters will sometimes be back to front, sometimes upside down and sometimes won't look like letters at all.

== Reception ==
The book received mixed reviews, with one of them noting that it could be specially useful for students with dyslexia. Writing for Kirkus Reviews, the author comments that the handwritten letters found throughout the book can be hard to read, and shouldn't be emulated by readers. They also note that the character's fast improvement is "too good to be true", but ends the review by saying the book's message that everyone needs to ask for help sometimes is very clear.

Alexander was praised for using progressively darker colors for the drawings to convey the character's "emotional turmoil and isolation" due to their inability to write the card and fear to ask for help.

In 2013, Back to Front and Upside Down! was awarded the Young Readers' Schneider Family Book Award. The book also received the Paterson Prize for "Continued Excellence in Children's Literature", awarded by the Passaic County Community College's Poetry Center.
