= Sarah Lean =

English author

Sarah Lean is an English author of children's literature, known for her book A Dog Called Homeless, which received the 2013 Schneider Family Book Award.

== Early life and career ==
Lean was born in Wells, Somerset, England. Before attending university she held a number of different jobs such as a page-planner, a stencil-maker and a gardener. She earned a first class degree in English at the University of Winchester with the intent to become a primary school teacher, but soon returned to university to complete an MA in Creative and Critical Writing.

She published her first book, A Dog Called Homeless, in 2012. It sold over 15,000 copies, and was awarded the Schneider Family Book Award for Middle School books in 2013.

In 2014, Lean was named a chosen author of World Book Day.

Her books have been described as "inspiring", "compelling", and "touching".

== Bibliography ==
- The Good Bear. Simon & Schuster Children's UK. 2020.
- Tiger Days – THE SECRET CAT. HarperCollins Publishers. 2017. ISBN 9780008245023.
- Harry and Hope. Katherine Tegen Books. 2015. ISBN 9780007512263.
- Hero. Katherine Tegen Books. 2015. ISBN 9780062122384.
- The Forever Whale. Katherine Tegen Books. 2013. ISBN 9780007512225.
- A Horse for Angel. Katherine Tegen Books. 2013. ISBN 9780007455058.
- A Dog Called Homeless. Katherine Tegen Books. 2012. ISBN 9780062122261.
