= Wanda Díaz-Merced =

American astrophysicist

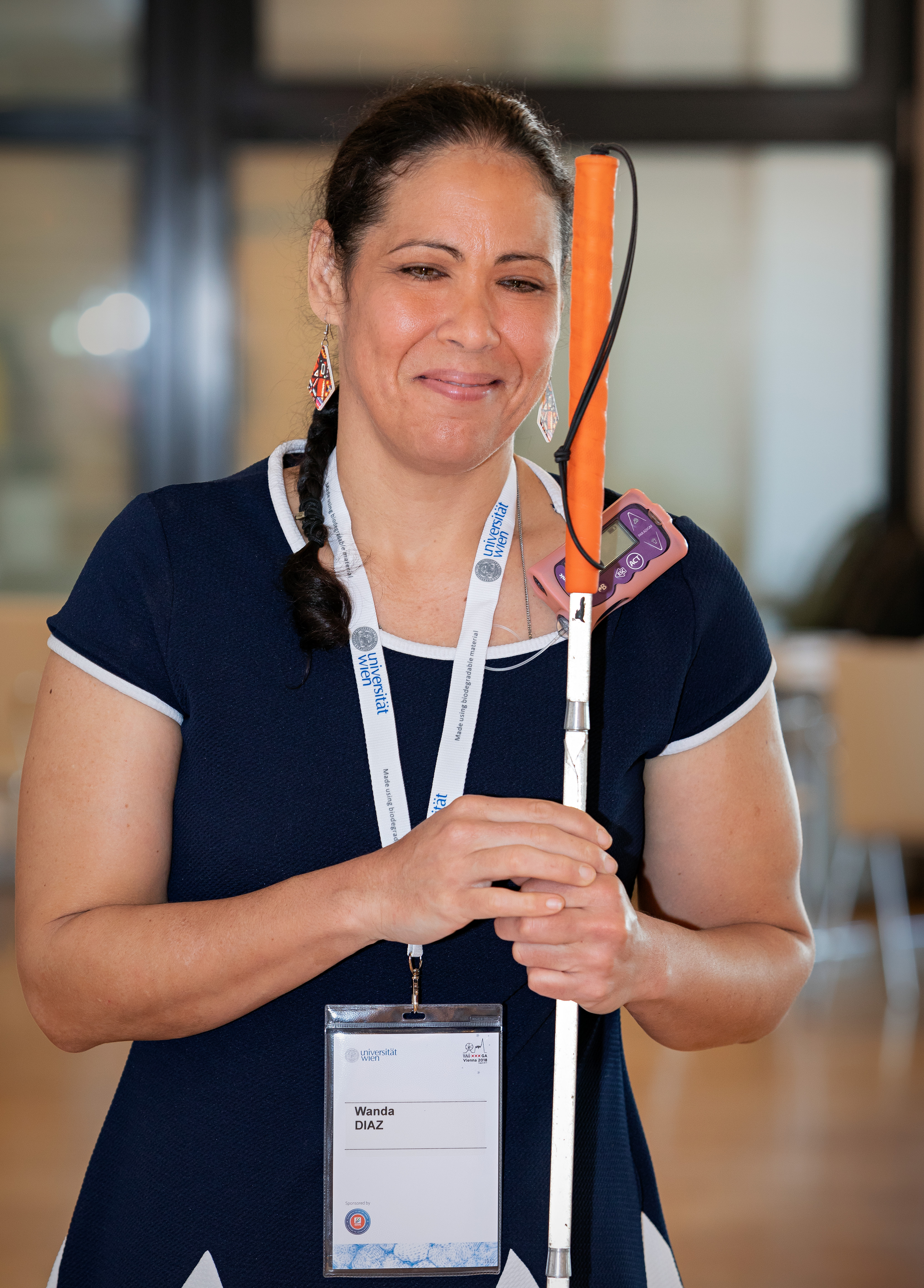
- Born: Gurabo, Puerto Rico
- Citizenship: United States
- Education: University of Puerto Rico; University of Glasgow (D.C.Sc.)
- Scientific career
- Fields: Astronomer
- Institutions: Arecibo Observatory
- Thesis: Sound for the exploration of space physics data (2013)
- Doctoral advisor: Stephen Brewster

Wanda Díaz-Merced is a Puerto Rican astronomer known for using sonification to turn large data sets into audible sound. Formerly at the European Gravitational Observatory Cascina, Italy, Díaz-Merced is currently the Director of the Arecibo C3 STEM Education Center. While losing her eyesight, Díaz-Merced brought attention to increasing equality of access to astronomy and using audible sound to study astrophysical data.. Díaz-Merced is a part of the 7 most trailblazing women in science by the BBC.

== Early life ==
Díaz-Merced was born in Gurabo, a small town in Puerto Rico. As children, Diaz-Merced and her sister would pretend to fly a spacecraft and explore other galaxies.

She entered the school science fair in middle school, where she won second place. This was a turning point for her as it made her realize that pursuing a career in science might be attainable.

Díaz-Merced lost her sight in her early twenties due to complications with degenerative diabetic retinopathy and found new ways to study stellar radiation without relying on her vision. She realized that she could use her ears to detect patterns in stellar radio data that could potentially be obscured in visual and graphical representation.

== Education ==
Díaz-Merced attended Matías González García Middle School and Dra. Conchita Cuevas High School in Gurabo, Puerto Rico. She then went on to study physics at the University of Puerto Rico. She received an internship with Robert Candey at the NASA Goddard Space Flight Center in Maryland, USA after she finished her undergraduate degree. She went on to receive a doctorate in computer science from the University of Glasgow in 2013, where she studied space data analysis. She was then accepted as a post-doctoral fellow at the Center for Astrophysics Harvard & Smithsonian. and South African Astronomical Observatory in Cape Town

== Scientific career ==
In 2020, Díaz-Merced accepted a simultaneous collaboration with the Harvard Smithsonian Center for Astrophysics and the European Gravitational Observatory proposal REINFORCE. Before this, she worked at the National Astronomical Observatory Japan (NAOJ), and the South African observatory's Office of Astronomy for Development (OAD). She has led the OAD project AstroSense since April 2014. She worked on the technique after she lost her sight as an undergraduate at the University of Puerto Rico. In 2016, she gave a TED Talk in Vancouver, BC, Canada. She is a member of the International Astronomical Union. While working at the Center for Astrophysics Harvard & Smithsonian, she collaborated with Gerhard Sonnert on a music album based on her audio representations. Composed by Volkmar Studtrucker, "X-Ray Hydra" includes nine pieces of music derived from NASA's Chandra X-Ray Observatory rendered as sound.

== Honors ==
In 2011, Diaz-Merced won one of Google's first annual European Scholarship for Students with Disabilities. This scholarship recognizes outstanding Ph.D. students doing exceptional research in the field of computer science.

Diaz-Merced was awarded an Estrella Luike trophy in 2017.

== Children's book ==
Díaz-Merced is the subject of the book Wanda Hears the Stars: A Blind Astronomer Listens to the Universe, co-written by herself and Amy S. Hansen and illustrated by Rocio Arreola Mendoza. The book won the 2026 Schneider Family Book Award for best young children’s title.

== Published works ==
- Paice, J. A.; Gandhi, P.; Charles, P. A.; et al. (September 2019). "Puzzling blue dips in the black hole candidate Swift J1357.2-0933, from ULTRACAM, SALT, ATCA, Swift, and NuSTAR". Monthly Notices of the Royal Astronomical Society. 488 (1): 512–524. arXiv:1905.09784. doi:10.1093/mnras/stz1613. ISSN 0035-8711.
- Diaz-Merced, Wanda L.; Candey, Robert M.; Brickhouse, Nancy; Schneps, Matthew; Mannone, John C.; Brewster, Stephen; Kolenberg, Katrien (2011). "Sonification of Astronomical Data". Proceedings of the International Astronomical Union. 7 (S285): 133–136. doi:10.1017/S1743921312000440. ISSN 1743-9213.
- Garcia, Beatriz; Diaz-Merced, Wanda; Casado, Johanna; Cancio, Angel (2019). "Evolving from xSonify: a new digital platform for sonorization". EPJ Web of Conferences. 200. S. Deustua, K. Eastwood, I.L. ten Kate (eds.): 01013. Bibcode:2019EPJWC.20001013G. doi:10.1051/epjconf/201920001013. hdl:11336/130934. ISSN 2100-014X.
- Kurtz, S.; Hofner, P.; Vargas, C.; Diaz-Merced, W. (2001). "High resolution radio continuum observations of high mass star formation regions". In R. T. Schilizzi; S. N. Vogel; F. Paresce; M. S. Elvis (eds.). Galaxies and Their Constituents at the Highest Angular Resolutions. San Francisco: Astronomical Soc Pacific. pp. 280–281. ISBN 978-1-58381-066-8.
- Diaz Merced, Wanda L. (2013). "Sound for the exploration of space physics data". University of Glasgow.
- Díaz-Merced, Wanda. "Making Astronomy Accessible for the Visually Impaired". Scientific American Blog Network. Retrieved 2020-07-12.
