= Fish in a Tree =

2015 novel by Lynda Mullaly Hunt

- First edition cover
- Author: Lynda Mullaly Hunt
- Publisher: Nancy Paulsen Books
- Publication date: February 5, 2015
- Pages: 288
- ISBN: 978-0-399-16259-6

Fish in a Tree is a 2015 middle-grade novel by American author Lynda Mullaly Hunt. It is Hunt's second novel, following One for the Murphys (2012). The novel centers on Ally Nickerson, a sixth-grade student who has concealed an undiagnosed reading disability from teachers and classmates for years. When a substitute teacher named Mr. Daniels recognizes her underlying intelligence, Ally begins a journey toward self-acceptance and literacy. The novel engages themes of neurodiversity, belonging, and the limits of conventional schooling.

== Background ==
Fish in a Tree grew out of Hunt's experiences on both sides of the classroom. Hunt has said the book came into being because of her time as a student who struggled and later as a teacher who looked for ways to ensure success for each of her students.

Hunt was placed in the lowest reading group from first grade through sixth grade, during which time she internalized the belief that other students were simply better than her. That changed when she was assigned to the sixth-grade class of a teacher named Mr. Christy, who handpicked books considered too challenging for her, arranged for her to tutor younger students in mathematics, and took a genuine interest in her opinions. Hunt has described the novel as "a giant thank you note" to Mr. Christy, crediting him with changing the trajectory of her life. The character of Mr. Daniels was directly modeled on Mr. Christy.

Hunt subsequently taught for 10 years before becoming a full-time writer and has reflected on how that classroom experience deepened her understanding of struggling students and shaped her approach to storytelling.

In writing the novel, Hunt also sought to challenge the assumption that intelligence is uniform, and to show that no child should be defined by a single label, a conviction she has expressed both in interviews and in her own writing for educators.

== Plot ==
Ally Nickerson is a sixth grader who has attended multiple schools, moving frequently due to her father's military service. At each school, she hides her inability to read through disruptive behavior, feigned illness, and clever distractions; anything to avoid written tasks. When her regular teacher goes on maternity leave, a new teacher, Mr. Daniels, takes over the class. Unlike previous teachers, he looks past Ally's misbehavior and perceives her creativity, artistic ability, and aptitude for mathematics.

Mr. Daniels works with Ally after school using methods adapted to her visual learning style. He eventually facilitates a formal evaluation, through which Ally is identified as having dyslexia. As her reading skills improve and her confidence grows, Ally forms close friendships with two classmates: Keisha, an outspoken aspiring baker, and Albert, a scientifically gifted but bullied boy. Together, the three navigate social pressure from Shay, a wealthy and relentlessly cruel peer, and a group of boys who physically bully Albert.

Ally runs for class president against Shay and wins, a victory that consolidates her sense of self-worth. Mr. Daniels presents the class with a list of accomplished historical figures who struggled with dyslexia, illustrating that academic difficulty is not a measure of intelligence. The novel concludes with Ally introducing her older brother Travis, who shares similar difficulties, to Mr. Daniels, underscoring the novel's central message that help is never too late.

== Themes ==
=== Neurodiversity and intelligence ===
The novel's central argument is that learning differences such as dyslexia are not indicators of low intelligence. Through Mr. Daniels gaining Ally's trust, he illustrates that a supportive educator who looks beyond diversionary tactics can unlock the "fierce intelligence" hidden beneath a learning difference. This is a dynamic that mirrors Hunt's own experience, as she reflects that her sixth grade teacher Mr. Christy "saved" her and saw beyond her struggles, which is why the book is a thank you to him and why the character of Mr. Daniels is inspired by him. The title of the book comes from an Einstein quote that reads, “Everyone is a genius. But if you judge a fish by its ability to climb a tree, it will live its whole life believing that it is stupid”, which further shows that measuring a student like Ally against a single standard of intelligence can make her feel incapable, when her intelligence just operates in a different way. Havran cites the novel as a key text for building inclusive classroom libraries that reflect neurodiversity.

=== Bullying and social ideology ===
Hameed and Hassoon apply a critical stylistic framework to the novel's depiction of bullying, examining how Shay's behavior reflects and reproduces social hierarchies. Their analysis positions the novel as not merely a story about individual cruelty but as a critique of the ideological structures that enable and sustain bullying within school environments.

=== The role of educators ===
Fisher and Frey reference the novel in the context of effective classroom instructional strategies, laying out how the book has been used in a 5th grade classroom. One teacher, Ms. Forehand, utilized an activity called "Four Corners"; she read a statement out about the book (such as "The friendship bracelets are a true symbol of friendship") and students moved into corners of the room that represented strongly agree, agree, disagree, and strongly disagree. This activity allowed students to work on making claims and supporting them, while reviewing information from a book with important themes. Hunt herself, writing in Voices from the Middle, reflected on the personal and professional experiences that shaped her understanding of struggling readers and informed the creation of Mr. Daniels as a character.

== Publication history ==
Fish in a Tree was published in 2015 by Nancy Paulsen Books, an imprint of Penguin. The book has been translated into 15 different languages.

== Reception ==
Fish in a Tree was reviewed by several major trade and academic publications following its release. Publishers Weekly praised the novel's portrayal of Ally's learning struggles as relatable and noted that her growth and relationships feel organic and real, though it observed that Hunt leans heavily on familiar character types and a surplus of relevant metaphors. Reynolds, writing in Horn Book Magazine, echoed these observations, finding Ally's depiction authentic while noting similar reliance on recognizable tropes. Smith, also reviewing the novel in Horn Book Magazine, highlighted the card scene, in which Ally accidentally gives her teacher a sympathy card at a baby shower, revealing she cannot read, as a pivotal moment, and praised the secondary characters for adding richness to Ally's first-person narrative. Smith noted that while the resolution to Ally's struggles happens too quickly, readers will nonetheless root for her. Coats, writing for The Bulletin of the Center for Children's Books, similarly acknowledged the novel's tendency toward cliché but praised Ally's "mind movies" as creative and witty, concluding that its treatment of bullying and quirky characters extends its appeal beyond readers with dyslexia alone.

== Awards and honors ==
In 2016, the Association for Library Service to Children named Fish in a Tree a Notable Children's Book. Fish in a Tree won the Schneider Family Book Award, an annual American Library Association prize recognizing books that authentically embody an experience of disability. Additional recognition included the SCBWI Crystal Kite Award, the Audible Kids Audiobook of the Year, and selection as an Amazon Best Book of the Year for ages 9–12.
