= Rules (novel) =

Debut novel by author Cynthia Lord

- Author: Cynthia Lord
- Language: English
- Genre: Children's Novel
- Publisher: Scholastic Paperbacks
- Publication place: United States
- ISBN: 978-0439443838
- OCLC: 61109244-439-44382-1
- LC Class: PZ7.L87734 Rul 2006

Rules is the debut novel by author Cynthia Lord. Released by Scholastic, Inc. in 2006, it was a Newbery Honor book in 2007. It is a Sunshine State Young Readers book for 2008–2009 and won A 2007 Schneider Family Book Award. In 2009 it also won the Dorothy Canfield Fisher Children's Book Award.

== Summary ==
Catherine, a 12-year-old girl, is trying to drag her brother, David, to the car. David has autism, and he has to go to occupational therapy. However, he won't leave the house. Catherine talks to moving men to see when her new neighbor will move into their home. She finally drags David to the car and they go to OT.

When they get there, she starts to sketch Jason, a boy who is unable to talk and is in a wheelchair. When she gives him the picture, they become friends. When she finally sees Kristi, the new neighbor girl, David is screaming. Kristi's first words to Catherine are "Is he okay?" Later, when she wants to meet them for real, they are busy unpacking, or not in the house.

The next time Catherine goes to OT, she agrees to help Jason by making more of his speech cards. While making the cards, David needs her to get a toy out of the fish tank, and she sees Kristi talking to Ryan, a very rude boy that bullies. One day, Catherine's mom is making hamburger patties, as she intends to invite Kristi and her family over for a picnic. However, Kristi is at her dad's house, and they fail to meet again. Catherine goes to OT again, and she gives Jason her new cards. They talk, and Catherine agrees to make a lot more cards for him.

While making the cards, Kristi is invited to her house by Catherine's mom, and they finally meet for the first time. They talk for a very long time and play basketball, which means that Catherine has to miss OT. Catherine's mom brings back a present for Catherine from Jason, which is carrots for her guinea pigs. The next time at OT, she brings the cards and a surprise for Jason, which is one of her own guinea pigs. While they go home, Catherine gets card stock and a paper cutter to make Jason more words. When they get home, Kristi is in the front yard with Ryan, and Ryan teases David with an empty gum wrapper.

The next week at OT, Jason wants Catherine to push Jason around in his wheelchair as fast as she can go, because he wants to know how it feels like to run, and she does. The next morning, Catherine and Kristi go to the pond and swim, until Ryan comes and messes up the whole morning by making Kristi go with him instead of Catherine. They ask Catherine to go to the community dance, but she declines the offer, saying that she doesn't dance unless she is alone or the room is pitch black. At OT, Jason and Catherine go for a walk. When Catherine sees Kristi, she hides so Kristi doesn't see her with a disabled boy. Jason invites Catherine to his birthday party, which is on the same day as the dance. She accepts, thinking that it will be a good excuse to not go to the dance. Catherine helps Kristi make posters for the dance. Kristi is rude that Catherine doesn't want to go to the dance. Catherine goes to buy Jason a guitar for his birthday, and Jason has a wheelchair that has a joystick.

When she goes to the party, she lets slip that there is a dance that night. Jason asks her if she wants to go, but she hesitates. Jason figures that she just doesn't want to go with a disabled boy, and he becomes very angry. When Catherine finally convinces him to go to the dance, she sees Kristi. Kristi is angry when she finds out that Jason is disabled and angry that Catherine didn't tell her that he was disabled. Catherine and Jason dance and Catherine realizes that her true friend is Jason, not anyone else that doesn't accept her or her friends.

== Characters ==
- Catherine - The main protagonist, and a 12-year-old girl. She is David's sister. When Kristi moves in, she is very excited and cannot wait to meet them. When she goes to her brother's occupational therapy, or OT, she meets another new friend, Jason. Because Jason is disabled, she is afraid that Kristi will judge her. Catherine, who is so desperate to be Kristi's best friend, hides the fact that Jason is disabled to Kristi. In the end, she learns that Jason is her true friend. Most of Catherine's life is her trying to help her brother David. Catherine has two guinea pigs. She loves to draw, but she can't dance. She loves to swim in the lake close to her house. In her free time, she makes word cards for Jason, and she makes lists of rules for David.
- David - Catherine's 8-year-old brother. He has autism, likes everything to go as planned, and hears everything louder than it actually is. He has to go to OT every week, and he enjoys dropping toys in the fish tank. He hates getting wet, and he is constantly teased by Ryan. His favorite thing to do is go to the video store. When he does puzzles, he has to do them from left to right. When something doesn't go as planned, he gets very angry, and he only likes the answers "yes" and "no", and will start screaming at "maybe" or "I don't know".
- Kristi - Catherine's new next door neighbor. She is very nice at first, and she volunteers at the community center. However, when introduced to Jason, she becomes very rude. She is friends with Ryan, and she is very "cool." Kristi doesn't like to go swimming in the pond, especially because it has mud on the bottom. Her parents are divorced, and she wants them to get back together.
- Jason - A disabled boy whom Catherine befriends. He goes to David's OT. He is unable to walk or talk. To communicate, he points to cards inside of his speech book. His mother has to push him around in his wheelchair. Later, however, he decides to get a wheelchair that has a joystick. He plays the piano, and after Catherine buys him a guitar, he starts to play the guitar. He loves to listen to music also. He can convince Catherine to dance at the very end of the book.
- Ryan - a bully. He picks on Catherine and David. When Kristi comes along, though, he starts to be nice to her, but truly, he is a very rude person. He calls David a retard, and he gives David an empty gum wrapper, knowing it will make him very mad and sad. He lets some kids stay in his house when they wait for the bus, but he leaves out Catherine and David.
- Catherine's mom - A homemaker. She cares a lot about David and Catherine. She is also good at a lot of things like cooking, helping, and working. She works at home, most of the time just calling her clients. She tries to make David talk, but she hates it when he uses words from someone else.
- Catherine's dad - A pharmacist. He works at a pharmacy, and he tries to work overtime to earn more money. He takes David to the video store a lot. He is always late, which makes David mad. He really likes to garden.

== Themes ==
1. People have good intentions to live by the rules they are given, but no matter how dedicated they are, some rules might be broken for reasons good or bad.
2. There are flaws in all of us – not just those with special needs.
3. We all try to do the best we can to fit in, but things don't always end up the way we intend.
4. Always stick with family no matter what.
5. Even the best of us can't stick to their own rules.

== Inspiration ==
Lord has two children, a son, and a daughter, and was inspired by them while writing Rules. She states that the character of David is loosely based on her son who has autism, while the character of Catherine is a mixture of herself and her daughter, who loves to draw. Most of the characters and incidents come from a very personal place in Lord's life, including the character of Jason, who was very loosely inspired by an experience she had as a kid while watching a child in a wheelchair communicating with his mother.

The Q&A following the end of the book welcomes the reader with these words when asked where the idea for Rules came from: "I have two children, a daughter, and a son, and my son has autism. One day when my daughter was about ten years old, she asked me, "Mom, how come I never see families like mine in books and on TV?" I didn't know how to answer her, so I went looking for children's books that included characters with severe special needs. I did find some, but most of the books I read seemed very sad to me. Sadness is part of living with someone with a severe disability, but it's only one part. It can also be funny, inspiring, heartwarming, disappointing, frustrating—everything that it is to love anyone and to live in any family."
