= Wanda Hears the Stars =

2025 picture book by Wanda Díaz-Merced

- Author: Wanda Díaz-Merced and Amy S. Hansen
- Illustrator: Rocio Arreola Mendoza
- Language: English, Spanish
- Publisher: Charlesbridge
- Publication date: August 19, 2025
- ISBN: 9781623544874

Wanda Hears the Stars: A Blind Astronomer Listens to the Universe is a 2025 non-fiction picture book written by Wanda Díaz-Merced and Amy S. Hansen and illustrated by Rocio Arreola Mendoza. It follows the story of how Díaz-Merced learned to use sonification, which converts data sets into sound, to continue her research into stars after losing her vision due to diabetes.

A Spanish edition, Wanda oye las estrellas: Una astrónoma ciega escucha al universo, was released the same day as the English book.

== Reception ==
Kirkus Reviews gave a positive review, noting the "onomatopoeia-adorned" language and "dark, jewel-toned hues" used to represent the night sky, and concluded Wanda Hears the Stars was "Uplifting and informative". School Library Journal reviewed Wanda oye las estrellas. Booklist gave the book a starred review, also including the book in its list of the Top 10 Biographies & Memoirs for Youth for 2025 and the 2025 Booklist Editors' Choice for Books for Youth.

The book won the 2026 Schneider Family Book Award for best young children's title. Mathical Books, a website covering children's literature with mathematical themes run by the Simons Laufer Mathematical Sciences Institute, included it in its 2026 Mathical Honor Book list.
