= State University of New York at Cortland =

Public university in Cortland, New York, US

Coordinates: 42°35.82′N 76°11.36′W

State University of New York Cortland
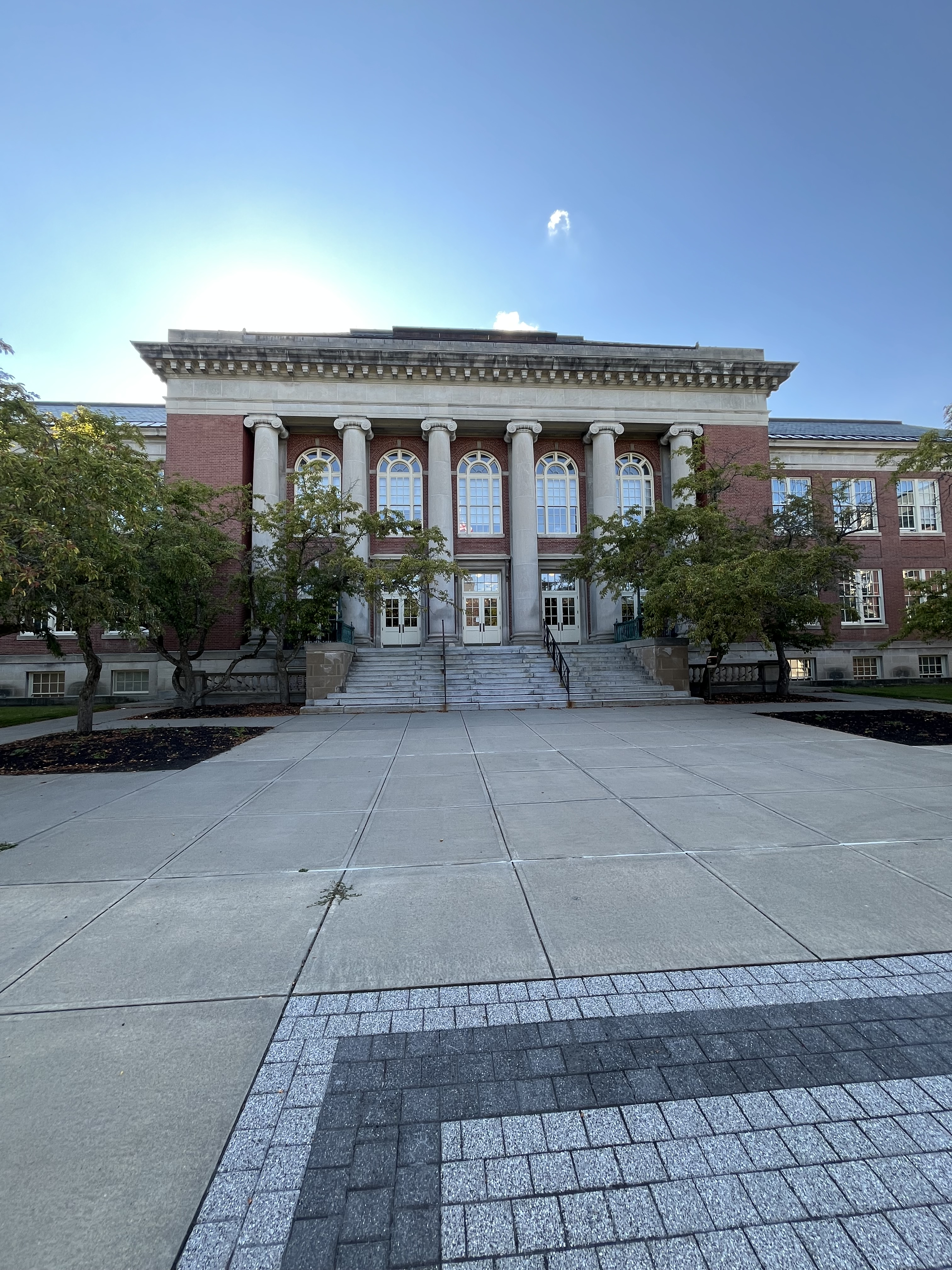
- Old Main
- Former names: Cortland Normal School (1868–1941); Cortland State Teachers College (1941–1961); State University of New York College at Cortland (1961–2023)
- Motto: Seize the Moment, Feel the Momentum
- Type: Public university
- Established: 1868; 158 years ago
- Parent institution: State University of New York
- Endowment: $76.9 million (2025)
- President: Erik Bitterbaum
- Provost: Ann McClellan
- Students: 6,981 (fall 2025)
- Undergraduates: 5,892 (fall 2025)
- Postgraduates: 1,089 (fall 2025)
- Location: Cortland, New York, United States
- Campus: 211 acres (0.85 km^{2})
- Colors: Red and white
- Nickname: Red Dragons
- Mascot: Blaze
- Website: www.cortland.edu

The State University of New York at Cortland (SUNY Cortland, C-State, or Cortland State) is a public university in Cortland, New York, United States. It was founded in 1868 and is part of the State University of New York (SUNY) system.

== History ==
The State University of New York Cortland was founded in 1868 as the Cortland Normal School. Among its earliest students was inventor and industrialist Elmer A. Sperry of Sperry Rand Corp.

In 1941, by an action made by the Board of Regents, the institution became a four-year college known as the "Cortland State Teachers College," where students could earn a bachelor's degree. In 1948, Cortland was a founding member of the State University of New York. In 1961, the college was officially renamed as the State University of New York College at Cortland.

On January 1, 2023, the State University of New York changed the name of the college from State University of New York College at Cortland to the State University of New York at Cortland.

== Campus ==
Cortland is off of Interstate 81, between Syracuse and Binghamton. The college's main campus covers 191 acres (770,000 m^{2}), and includes 30 traditional and modern buildings. Fourteen of these structures are residence halls that provide housing for approximately 3,000 students. SUNY Cortland also operates its Outdoor Education Center at Raquette Lake in the Adirondacks, the Hoxie Gorge Nature Preserve outside Cortland, and the Brauer Education Center on the Helderberg Escarpment near Albany.

The U.S. Department of the Interior in 2004 designated Camp Pine Knot, now known as the Huntington Memorial Camp and part of its Outdoor Education center at Raquette Lake, as the first and only National Historic Landmark within the State University of New York (SUNY). Camp Pine Knot was the first Great Camp of the Adirondacks and the birthplace of what is now known as the Adirondack style of architecture. SUNY Cortland has 55,000 alumni who live in all 50 states and in more than 40 countries.

== Organization and administration ==
Cortland is a comprehensive college within the State University of New York system.

== Academics ==
Academic rankings

Master's
- Washington Monthly: 45 of 604

Regional
- U.S. News & World Report: 33 (tie) of 159

National
- Forbes: 495 of 500
- WSJ/College Pulse: 345 of 500

Today, approximately 6,800 students are pursuing degrees within the college's three academic divisions—arts and sciences, education and professional studies. Twenty-eight academic departments with a faculty of more than 600 offer the SUNY Cortland student body 50 majors and 38 minors from which to choose, plus 33 graduate majors and four certificates of advanced study.

SUNY Cortland houses the oldest and largest sport management department in the SUNY system. Founded by Dr. Suzanne Wingate, the SUNY Cortland Sports Management Department has enrolled students since the Fall semester of 1985.

== Student life ==
Undergraduate demographics as of Fall 2023
Race and ethnicity	Total
White	76%
Hispanic	12%
Black	4%
Unknown	3%
Two or more races	2%
Asian	1%
International student	1%
Economic diversity
Low-income (Note: The percentage of students who received an income-based federal Pell grant intended for low-income students.)	28%
Affluent (Note: The percentage of students who are a part of the American middle class at the bare minimum.)	72%

SUNY Cortland has over 100 student clubs.

In 2015, the school opened a $56 million Student Life Center (SLC). The SLC covers more than 150,000 square feet (14,000 m^{2}) and includes a three-court gymnasium, a swimming pool, indoor running track, rock climbing wall, dining bistro, table tennis room, game room, combatives room, various exercise spaces, a golf simulator, and cardio and weight training equipment.

=== Athletics ===
The Cortland Red Dragons are the athletic teams for SUNY Cortland. The college competes in NCAA Division III in the State University of New York Athletic Conference for most sports. Football played in the New Jersey Athletic Conference from 2000 to 2014, and became an affiliate member of the Empire 8 in 2015. Wrestling competes in the Empire Collegiate Wrestling Conference, the women's ice hockey team competes in the ECAC West, women's gymnastics is a National Collegiate Gymnastics Association (NCGA) East member, and women's golf is an independent, as those sports are not offered by the SUNYAC.

SUNY Cortland has had the most regional successful men's and women's intercollegiate athletics program in New York over the past two decades. In 1995, the Sears Directors' Cup was established to gauge and recognize the most successful intercollegiate athletics programs in the nation. SUNY Cortland is one of only five colleges and universities in the U.S. to have finished every year among the Top 25 NCAA Division III programs. Cortland placed 12th out of approximately 440 schools during the 2015–16 competition that is now known as the Learfield Sports Directors' Cup. The competition is sponsored by USA Today, the National Association of Collegiate Directors of Athletics, and Learfield Sports. The standings are based on schools' national finishes in different sports.

The Cortland Red Dragons annually play Ithaca College Bombers for the Cortaca Jug, which was added in 1959 to an already competitive rivalry. The match-up is one of the most prominent in Division III college football. It was called the "biggest little game in the nation" by Sports Illustrated in 1991. The Red Dragons had a seven-game winning streak as of November 2016, but lost 48–20 in 2017. They also play the Cortaca Mic game every Friday before the Cortaca Jug game. Which is played between the Ithaca (WICB) and Cortland (WSUC) school radio stations. Cortland has never lost this game since it has been played.

Cortland also plays rival SUNY school Oswego each year for the "Dragon Sword" in Women's Field Hockey. The sword was donated by Oswego alumni Kimberlee (Bennett) and Michael Champitto and began play annually in 1999. As of 2021 Cortland has never failed to capture the sword at this event.

Cortland snapped Salisbury University's 69-game win streak to capture the 2006 NCAA Men's Lacrosse Div. III National Championship. The team reached the 2007 and 2008 national championship in rematch games against Salisbury University. The lacrosse team won its second Division III national championship in 2009, defeating Gettysburg in the finals.

In 2006 as part of its Silver Anniversary of sponsoring women's sports, the NCAA named the SUNY Cortland women's cross country program as its top cross country program of the past 25 years. The Cortland women captured seven NCAA Division III national championships in a nine-year span between 1989 and 1997 (1989, 1991–1995, 1997). In addition, the Cortland men's cross country team won the 2008 NCAA Div. III championship.

In all, Cortland teams have won 25 national titles, including 18 NCAA crowns. Along with the titles mentioned above, the field hockey team won NCAA Div. III titles in 1993, 1994 and 2001, the women's outdoor track and field team won an NCAA Div. III title in 1985 and the women's indoor track and field team was the 1991 NCAA Div. III champion. The men's lacrosse squad won the NCAA Div. II title in 1975 and the USILA College Division championship in 1973. The women's soccer won the 1992 NCAA Div. III tournament and captured the first-ever U.S. National Women's Soccer Championship in 1980, defeating UCLA in the finals. The men's gymnastics team won USGF Div. II-III titles in 1986, 1987, 1989 and 1990. The baseball and Women's Lacrosse teams each won their first ever Div. III titles in 2015. The women's lacrosse team won 18 SUNYAC titles between 1997 and 2015.

The Men's Football team won its first NCAA Division III National Championship in 2023.

Cortland previously hosted the summer training camp of the NFL's New York Jets from 2009 to 2014, except for 2011 due to the NFL lockout.

=== International Exchange Program ===
SUNY Cortland has 18 partner universities across the world such as the German Sport University Cologne and the Griffith University in Australia.

== Notable people ==
=== Faculty ===
- Thomas Blanchard Stowell, Chair of Natural Sciences (1869–1889)
- Robert S. Newman, anthropology (1973)
- Robert Spitzer, political science (1979–present)
