= Nora Raleigh Baskin =

American author of books for children and young adults

- Born: Nora Raleigh; May 18, 1961 (age 65); New York City, US
- Education: State University of New York at Purchase
- Writing career
- Genres: Young adult, middle grade and children's realistic fiction
- Notable works: What Every Girl (Except Me) Knows, Anything but Typical
- Website: www.norabaskin.com

Nora Raleigh Baskin (born May 18, 1961) is an American author of books for children and young adults.

== Biography ==
Nora Baskin was born in Brooklyn, New York City and is Jewish. When Baskin was three, her mother committed suicide, and many of her own feelings surrounding that incident have later fueled her writing. When Baskin was seven, she and her family moved to upstate New York. When she was 23, she graduated from the State University of New York at Purchase.

Her books are based on her life, with Baskin feeling as though she has been writing about the same character much of her life. At first, Baskin began by writing fiction for adults and had been trying to get published for around five years. During a writing course Baskin took, a woman suggested she try writing for children, and Baskin changed her target audience. In 1999, the story of the "sad motherless little girl" that she felt had been inside of her became part of her first published novel, What Every Girl (Except Me) Knows. In her novel Surfacing, Baskin describes grief and how for even small children a family tragedy can "scab over into guilt and blame," according to Kirkus Reviews.

Baskin is the winner of the Cuffie Award from Publishers Weekly for Most Promising New Author. Her book The Truth About My Bat Mitzvah was a 2008 Jewish Book Council Network selection. In 2010, she won the American Library Association's (ALA) Schneider Family Award for her book Anything but Typical.

Baskin teaches writing and literature in a school. She also holds writers' workshops for middle school. She lives in Weston, Connecticut, with her family.

== Books ==
- What Every Girl (Except Me) Knows. Little, Brown Books for Young Readers. 2001. ISBN 9780316070218.
- Almost Home. Little, Brown Books for Young Readers. 2003. ISBN 9780316093132.
- Basketball (or Something Like It). HarperCollins Publishers. 2005. ISBN 9780060596118.
- In the Company of Crazies. HarperCollins Publishers. 2006. ISBN 9780060596071.
- All We Know of Love. Candlewick Press. 2008. ISBN 9780763636234.
- The Truth About My Bat Mitzvah. Simon & Schuster Children's Publishing. 2008. ISBN 9781416935582.
- Anything but Typical. Simon & Schuster Books for Young Readers. 2009. ISBN 9781416963783.
- The Summer Before Boys. Simon & Schuster Books for Young Readers. 2011. ISBN 9781416986737.
- Surfacing. Candlewick. 2013. ISBN 9780763649081.
- Runt. Simon & Schuster Books for Young Readers. 2013. ISBN 9781442458079.
- Subway Love. Candlewick Press. 2014. ISBN 9780763668457.
- Ruby on the Outside. Simon & Schuster Books for Young Readers. 2015. ISBN 9781442485037.
- Nine, Ten. Simon & Schuster Books for Young Readers. 2016. ISBN 9781442485068.
- Seven Clues to Home (with Gae Posner). Alfred A. Knopf Books for Young Readers. 2020. ISBN 9780593119617.
- Consider the Octopus. Henry Holt and Co. Books for Young Readers. 2022. ISBN 9781250793515.
