= Howard Cosell =

American sport journalist and broadcaster (1918–1995)

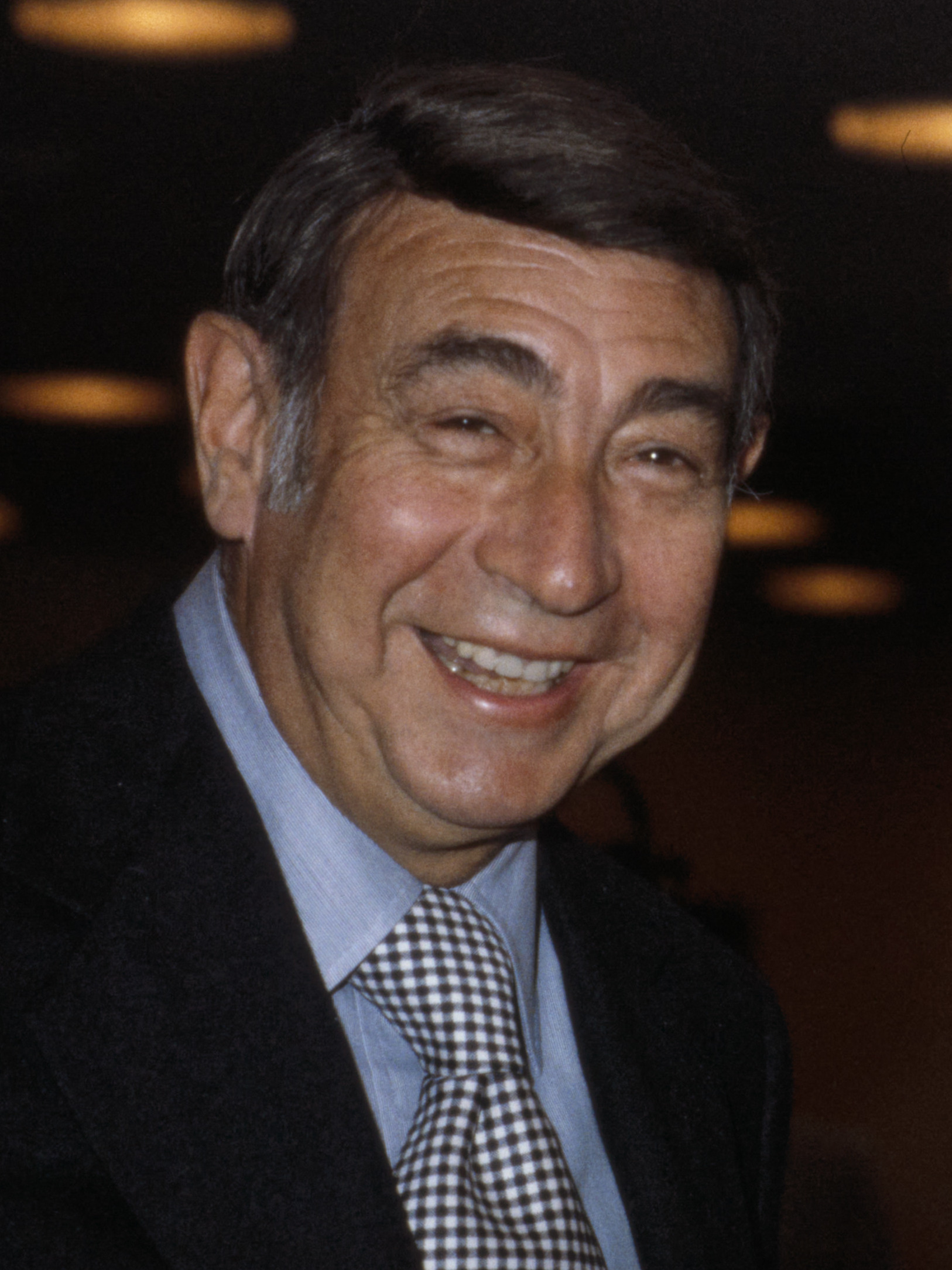
- Cosell in 1980
- Born: Howard William Cohen; March 25, 1918; Winston-Salem, North Carolina, U.S.
- Died: April 23, 1995 (aged 77); New York City, U.S.
- Education: New York University
- Occupations: Journalist; author; radio personality; columnist; sports commentator; lawyer; television personality
- Years active: 1953–1993
- Spouse: Mary Edith Abrams (m. 1944; died 1990)
- Children: 2
- Military career
- Allegiance: United States
- Branch: United States Army
- Service years: 1941–1945
- Rank: Major
- Unit: United States Army Transportation Corps
- Conflicts: World War II

Howard William Cosell (/koʊˈsɛl/; né Cohen; March 25, 1918 – April 23, 1995) was an American sports journalist, broadcaster, and author. He became prominent and influential during his tenure with ABC Sports from 1953 to 1985.

Cosell was widely known for his blustery and confident personality. He said of himself, "I've been called arrogant, pompous, obnoxious, vain, cruel, verbose, a showoff. And, of course, I am." Cosell was sardonically nicknamed "Humble Howard" by fans and media critics.

In its obituary for Cosell, The New York Times described Cosell's effect on American sports coverage:

He entered sports broadcasting in the mid-1950s, when the predominant style was unabashed adulation, [and] offered a brassy counterpoint that was first ridiculed, then copied until it became the dominant note of sports broadcasting.

He also brought an antagonistic, almost heel-like commentary, notably criticism of Terry Bradshaw suggesting that he did not have the intelligence to win in the league.

In 1993, TV Guide named Cosell the all-time best sportscaster.

== Early life and education ==
Cosell was born in Winston-Salem, North Carolina, to accountant Isidore Cohen and his wife Nellie Cohen (née Rosenthal). The grandson of a rabbi, he was raised in Brooklyn, New York City.

The name of Cosell's grandfather was changed when he entered the United States; Howard Cosell said he changed his name from "Cohen" to "Cosell" while a law student as a way to honor his father and grandfather by reverting to a version of his family's original Polish name. He attended New York University School of Law and was admitted to the bar in 1939.

Cosell served in the Army Transportation Corps in World War II from 1942 to 1945. He was honorably discharged with the rank of major.

== Career ==
=== Introduction to broadcasting ===
In the early 1950s, Cosell had a sports radio show which he would record early in the morning. Ned Garver recalled doing an interview with him in 1951. Cosell told Garver that the sponsor did not provide any gifts to the guests on the show, but Garver found out later that there actually were gifts and that Cosell kept them himself.

Cosell represented the Little League of New York, when in 1953, Hal Neal (president ABC Radio), then an ABC Radio manager, asked him to host a show on New York flagship WABC featuring Little League participants. The show marked the beginning of a relationship with WABC and ABC Radio that would last his entire broadcasting career.

Cosell hosted the Little League show for three years without pay, and then decided to leave law to become a full-time broadcaster. He approached Robert Pauley, President of ABC Radio, with a proposal for a weekly show. Pauley told him the network could not afford to develop untried talent, but he would be put on the air if he would get a sponsor. To Pauley's surprise, Cosell came back with a relative's shirt company as a sponsor, and the show Speaking of Sports was born.

Cosell took his "tell it like it is" approach when he teamed with the ex–Brooklyn Dodgers pitcher "Big Numba Thirteen" Ralph Branca on WABC's pre- and post-game radio shows of the New York Mets in their nascent years beginning in 1962. He pulled no punches in taking members of the hapless expansion team to task.

Otherwise on radio, Cosell did his show, Speaking of Sports, as well as sports reports and updates for affiliated radio stations around the country; he continued his radio duties even after he became prominent on television. Cosell then became a sports anchor at WABC-TV in New York, where he served in that role from 1961 to 1974. He expanded his commentary beyond sports to a radio show, Speaking of Everything.

=== Rise to prominence, support of black athletes ===
Cosell rose to prominence in the early 1960s, covering boxer Muhammad Ali, beginning from the time he fought under his birth name, Cassius Clay. The two seemed to have an affinity despite their different personalities, and complemented each other in broadcasts. Cosell was one of the first sportscasters to refer to him as Muhammad Ali after he changed his name, and supported him when he refused to be inducted into the military. Cosell was also an outspoken supporter of Olympic sprinters John Carlos and Tommie Smith, after they raised their fists in a "black power" salute during their 1968 medal ceremony in Mexico City. In a time when many sports broadcasters avoided touching social, racial, or other controversial issues, and kept a certain level of collegiality towards the sports figures they commented on, Cosell did not, and indeed built a reputation around his catchphrase, "I'm just telling it like it is."

Cosell's style of reporting transformed sports broadcasting in the United States. Whereas previous sportscasters had mostly been known for color commentary and lively play-by-play, Cosell had an intellectual approach. His use of analysis and context brought television sports reporting closer to "hard" news reporting. However, his distinctive staccato voice, accent, syntax, and cadence were a form of color commentary all their own.

Cosell earned his greatest interest from the public when he backed Ali after his heavyweight title was stripped from him for refusing military service during the Vietnam War. Cosell found vindication several years later when he was able to inform Ali that the United States Supreme Court had unanimously ruled in favor of Ali in Clay v. United States.

Cosell called most of Ali's fights immediately before and after Ali's return from his three-year exile in October 1970. Those fights were broadcast on tape delay usually a week after they were transmitted on closed circuit. However, Cosell did not call two of Ali's biggest fights, the Rumble in the Jungle in October 1974 and the first Ali–Joe Frazier bout in March 1971. Promoter Jerry Perenchio selected actor Burt Lancaster, who had never provided color commentary for a fight, to work the bout with longtime announcer Don Dunphy and former light-heavyweight champion Archie Moore. Cosell attended that fight as a spectator only. He would do a voice-over of that bout, when it was shown on ABC a few days before the second Ali-Frazier bout in January 1974.

Perhaps his most famous call took place in early 1973 at the fight between heavyweight champion Joe Frazier and top challenger George Foreman in Kingston, Jamaica. When Foreman knocked Frazier to the mat the first of six times, roughly two minutes into the first round, Cosell yelled out:

Down goes Frazier! Down goes Frazier! Down goes Frazier!

His call of Frazier's first trip to the mat became one of the most quoted phrases in American sports broadcasting history. Foreman beat Frazier by a TKO in the second round to win the World Heavyweight Championship.

Cosell provided blow-by-blow commentary for ABC of some of boxing's biggest matches during the 1970s and the early-1980s, including Ken Norton's upset win over Ali in 1973 and Ali's defeat of Leon Spinks in 1978 recapturing the heavyweight title for the third time. His signature toupee was unceremoniously knocked off in front of live ABC cameras when a scuffle broke out after a broadcast match between Scott LeDoux and Johnny Boudreaux. Cosell quickly retrieved his hairpiece and replaced it. During interviews in studio with Ali, the champion would tease and threaten to remove the hairpiece with Cosell playing along but never allowing it to be touched.

Ali would frequently refer to Cosell's hairpiece as a squirrel, rabbit or other wild animal. On one of these occasions, Ali quipped, "Cosell, you're a phony, and that thing on your head comes from the tail of a pony."

With typical headline-generating drama, Cosell abruptly ended his broadcast association with the sport of boxing while providing coverage for ABC for the heavyweight championship bout between Larry Holmes and Randall "Tex" Cobb on November 26, 1982. Halfway through the bout and with Cobb absorbing a beating, Cosell stopped providing anything more than rudimentary comments about round number and the participants punctuated with occasional declarations of disgust during the 15 rounds. He declared shortly after the fight to a national television audience that he had broadcast his last professional boxing match. Years later, in an interview on The Late Show with Joan Rivers, Cosell stated that the Holmes-Cobb fight, combined with the death of Duk Koo Kim, the beating that Aaron Pryor put on Alexis Arguello in their second fight, and the political climate in the boxing world led him to renounce his association with the sport and that he had been "proud" of his actions.

Cosell also was an ABC commentator for the television broadcast of the second of the two famous 1973 "Battles of the Sexes" tennis matches, this one between Bobby Riggs and Billie Jean King.

=== Feuds ===
During Cosell's tenure as a sportscaster, he frequently clashed with longtime New York Daily News sports columnist Dick Young, who rarely missed an opportunity to denigrate the broadcaster in print as an "ass", a "shill", or most often, "Howie the Fraud". Young would sometimes stand near Cosell and shout profanities so that the audio he was taping for his radio show would be unusable. Writing about Cosell, sportswriter Jimmy Cannon sniped, "This is a guy who changed his name, put on a toupee and tried to convince the world that he tells it like it is." He further added, "If Howard Cosell were a sport, he'd be roller derby."

Cosell, according to longtime ABC racecaster Chris Economaki, "had an enormous and monumental ego, and may have been the most pompous man I've ever met". Cosell ripped Economaki for a miscue in an interview with Cale Yarborough for ABC "(and he) never let me forget that". At an ABC Christmas party Economaki's wife asked to be introduced to Cosell and Chris said, "'Howard, for some inexplicable reason my wife wants to meet you...' and it (ticked) him off to no end. He really took it personally."

=== Monday Night Football ===
In 1970, ABC executive producer for sports Roone Arledge hired Cosell to be a commentator for Monday Night Football (MNF), the first time in 15 years that American football was broadcast weekly in prime time. Cosell was accompanied most of the time by ex-football players Frank Gifford and Don Meredith.

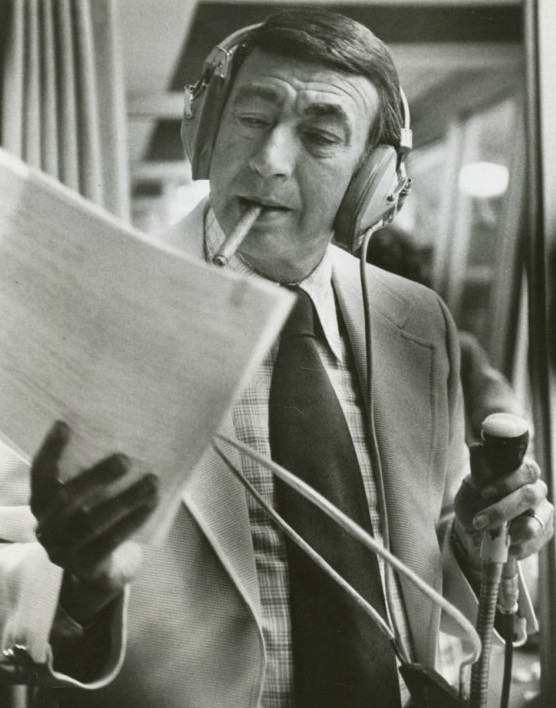
Cosell in the broadcast booth in 1975

Cosell was openly contemptuous of ex-athletes appointed to prominent sportscasting roles solely on account of their playing fame. He regularly clashed on-air with Meredith, whose laid-back style was in sharp contrast to Cosell's more critical approach to the games.

The Cosell–Meredith–Gifford dynamic helped make Monday Night Football a success; it frequently was the number one rated program in the weekly Nielsen ratings. The inimitable style of the group (mostly with Cosell, both loved and hated by the public) distinguished Monday Night Football as a distinct spectacle, and ushered in an era of more colorful broadcasters and 24/7 TV sports coverage.

It was during his MNF run that Cosell coined a phrase that came to be so identified with football that other announcers and spectators—notably Chris Berman—began to repeat it. An ordinary kickoff return began with Cosell giving commentary about a player's difficult life. It became extraordinary when he suddenly observed, in his trademark staccato rhythm, "He could ... go all ... the way!"

Cosell has been credited for popularizing the term "nachos" during his time in the MNF booth.

==== Departure from MNF: Alvin Garrett incident ====
During the first half of the September 5, 1983, Monday Night Football game between the Dallas Cowboys and Washington Redskins, Cosell's commentary on wide receiver Alvin Garrett included "That little monkey gets loose doesn't he?" Cosell's references to Garrett as a "little monkey," ignited a racial controversy that laid the groundwork for Cosell's departure from MNF at the end of the 1983 season. The Rev. Joseph Lowery, then-president of the Southern Christian Leadership Conference, denounced Cosell's comment as racist and demanded a public apology. Despite supportive statements by Jesse Jackson, Muhammad Ali, and Alvin Garrett himself, the fallout contributed to Cosell's decision to leave Monday Night Football following the 1983 season.

"I liked Howard Cosell," Garrett said. "I didn't feel that it was a demeaning statement." Cosell explained that Garrett's small stature, and not his race, was the basis for his comment, citing the fact that he had used the term to describe his own grandchildren. Among other evidence to support Cosell's claim is video footage of a 1972 preseason game between the New York Giants and the Kansas City Chiefs that features Cosell referring to athlete Mike Adamle, a 5-foot, 8-inch, 195-pound White man, as a "little monkey."

=== Olympics ===
Along with Monday Night Football, Cosell worked the Olympics for ABC. He played a key role on ABC's coverage of the Palestinian terror group Black September's mass murder of Israeli athletes in Munich at the 1972 Summer Olympics; providing reports directly from the Olympic Village (his image can be seen and voice heard in Steven Spielberg's film about the terror attack).

In the 1976 Summer Games in Montreal, and the 1984 games in Los Angeles, Cosell was the main voice for boxing. Sugar Ray Leonard won the gold medal in his light welterweight class at Montreal, beginning his meteoric rise to a world professional title three years later. Cosell became close to Leonard, during this period, announcing many of his fights.

=== "The Bronx is burning" ===
Cosell was widely attributed with saying the famous phrase "the Bronx is burning". Cosell is credited with saying this during Game 2 of the 1977 World Series, which took place in Yankee Stadium on October 12, 1977. For a couple of years, fires had routinely erupted in the South Bronx, mostly because owners of low-value properties would burn their own real estate for insurance money. During the bottom of the first inning, an ABC aerial camera panned a few blocks from Yankee Stadium to a building on fire. The scene became a defining image of New York City in the 1970s. Cosell supposedly stated, "There it is, ladies and gentlemen. The Bronx is burning." This was later picked up by Republican presidential candidate Ronald Reagan, who then made a special trip to the Bronx, to illustrate the failures of politicians to address the issues in that part of New York City.

In 2005, author Jonathan Mahler published Ladies and Gentlemen, The Bronx Is Burning, a book about New York in 1977, and credited Cosell with the title quote during the aerial coverage of the fire. ESPN produced a 2007 mini-series based on the book The Bronx Is Burning. Cosell's comment seemed to have captured the widespread view that New York City was in a state of decline.

The truth was discovered after Major League Baseball published a complete DVD set of all of the games of the 1977 World Series. Coverage of the fire began with Keith Jackson's comments regarding the enormity of the blaze, while Cosell added that President Jimmy Carter had visited that area just days before. At the top of the second inning, the fire was once again shown from a helicopter-mounted camera, and Cosell commented that the New York Fire Department had a hard job to do in the Bronx as there were always numerous fires. In the bottom of the second, Cosell informed the audience that it was an abandoned building that was burning and no lives were in danger. There was no further comment on the fire, and Cosell appears to have never said, "The Bronx is burning" (at least not on camera) during Game 2.

Mahler's confusion could have arisen from a 1974 documentary entitled The Bronx Is Burning; it is likely Mahler confused the documentary with his recollection of Cosell's comments when writing his book.

=== Public report of the death of John Lennon ===
On the night of December 8, 1980, during a Monday Night Football game between the Miami Dolphins and the New England Patriots, Cosell shocked the television audience by interrupting his regular commentary duties to deliver a news bulletin on the murder of John Lennon in the midst of a live broadcast. Word had been passed to Cosell and Frank Gifford by Roone Arledge, who was president of ABC's news and sports divisions at the time, near the end of the game.

Cosell was initially apprehensive about announcing Lennon's death. Off the air, Cosell conferred with Gifford and others, saying: "Fellas, I just don't know, I'd like your opinion. I can't see this game situation allowing for that news flash, can you?" Gifford replied, "Absolutely. I can see it." Gifford later told Cosell, "Don't hang on it. It's a tragic moment and this is going to shake up the whole world."

On air, Gifford prefaced the announcement saying, "And I don't care what's on the line, Howard, you have got to say what we know in the booth." Cosell then replied:

Yes, we have to say it. Remember this is just a football game, no matter who wins or loses. An unspeakable tragedy confirmed to us by ABC News in New York City: John Lennon, outside of his apartment building on the West Side of New York City—the most famous, perhaps, of all of the Beatles—shot twice in the back, rushed to Roosevelt Hospital, dead on arrival. Hard to go back to the game after that newsflash, which, in duty bound, we have to take.

Lennon had been shot four times and had not been pronounced dead on arrival, but the facts of the shooting were not clear at the time of the announcement. Lennon once appeared on Monday Night Football, during the December 9, 1974, telecast of a 23–17 Washington Redskins win over the Los Angeles Rams, and was interviewed for a short breakaway segment by Cosell.

ABC had obtained this scoop as a result of the coincidence of an ABC employee, Alan Weiss, being at the same emergency room where the critically wounded Lennon was brought that night. This unwittingly violated a request to the hospital by Lennon's wife, Yoko Ono, to delay reporting his death until she could tell their son, Sean, herself. Sean, age 5, was not watching television at the time as it was near midnight, and Ono was able to break the news to him. NBC beat ABC to the punch, however, interrupting The Tonight Show just minutes before Cosell's announcement with a "breaking news" segment.

=== Sports journalism and ABC SportsBeat magazine show ===
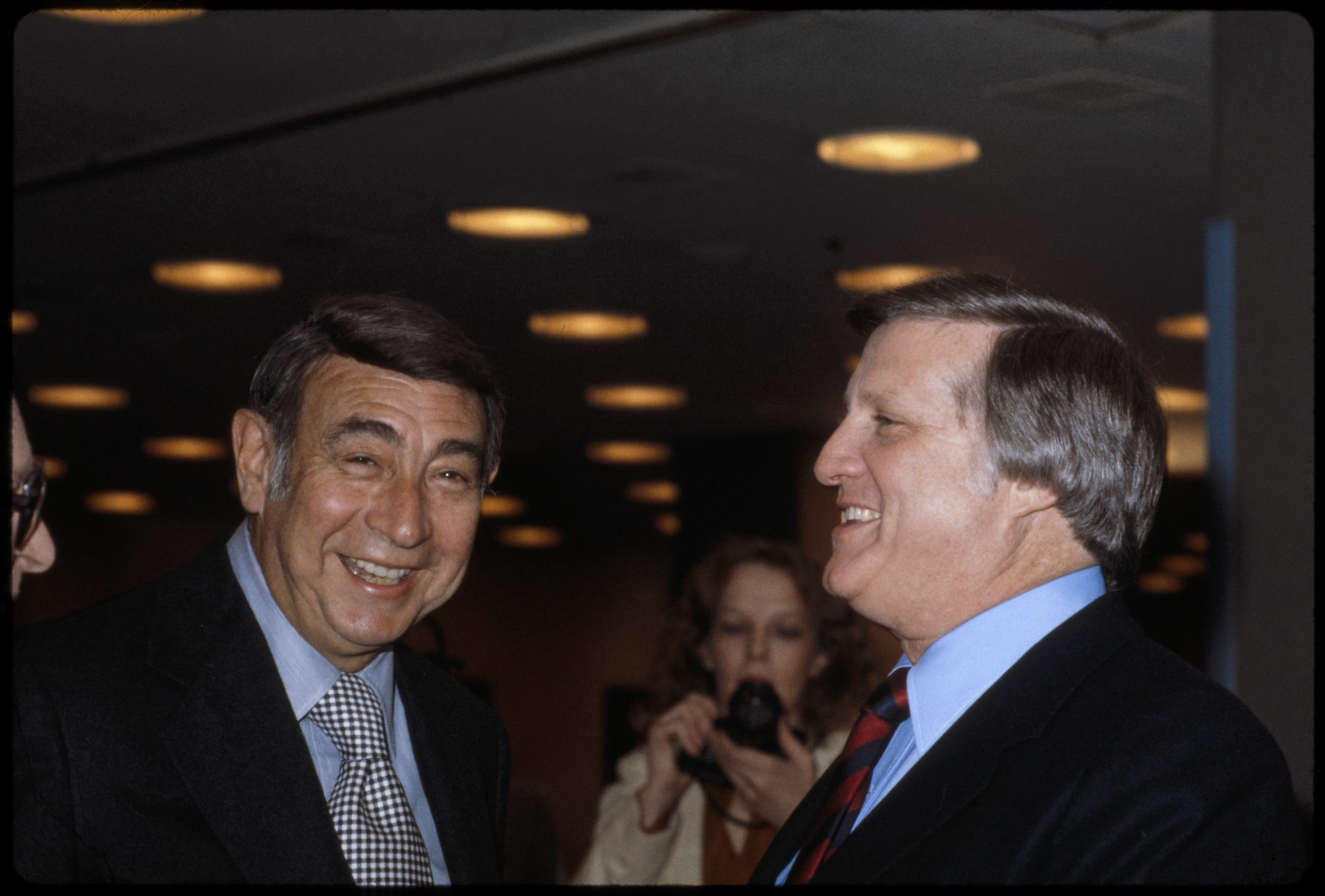
Cosell with George Steinbrenner in 1980

In the fall of 1981, Cosell debuted a serious investigative 30-minute magazine show, ABC SportsBeat on ABC's weekend schedule. He made news and covered topics that were not part of general sports coverage—including the first story about drugs in professional sports (the story of former Minnesota Viking Carl Eller's cocaine use), an in-depth look at how NFL owners negotiated tax breaks and incentives for building new stadiums, and together with Arthur Ashe, an investigation into apartheid and sports. Though ratings were low, Cosell and his staff earned three Emmy Awards for excellence in reporting, and broke new ground in sports journalism. At the time, ABC SportsBeat was the first and only regularly scheduled network program devoted solely to sports journalism.

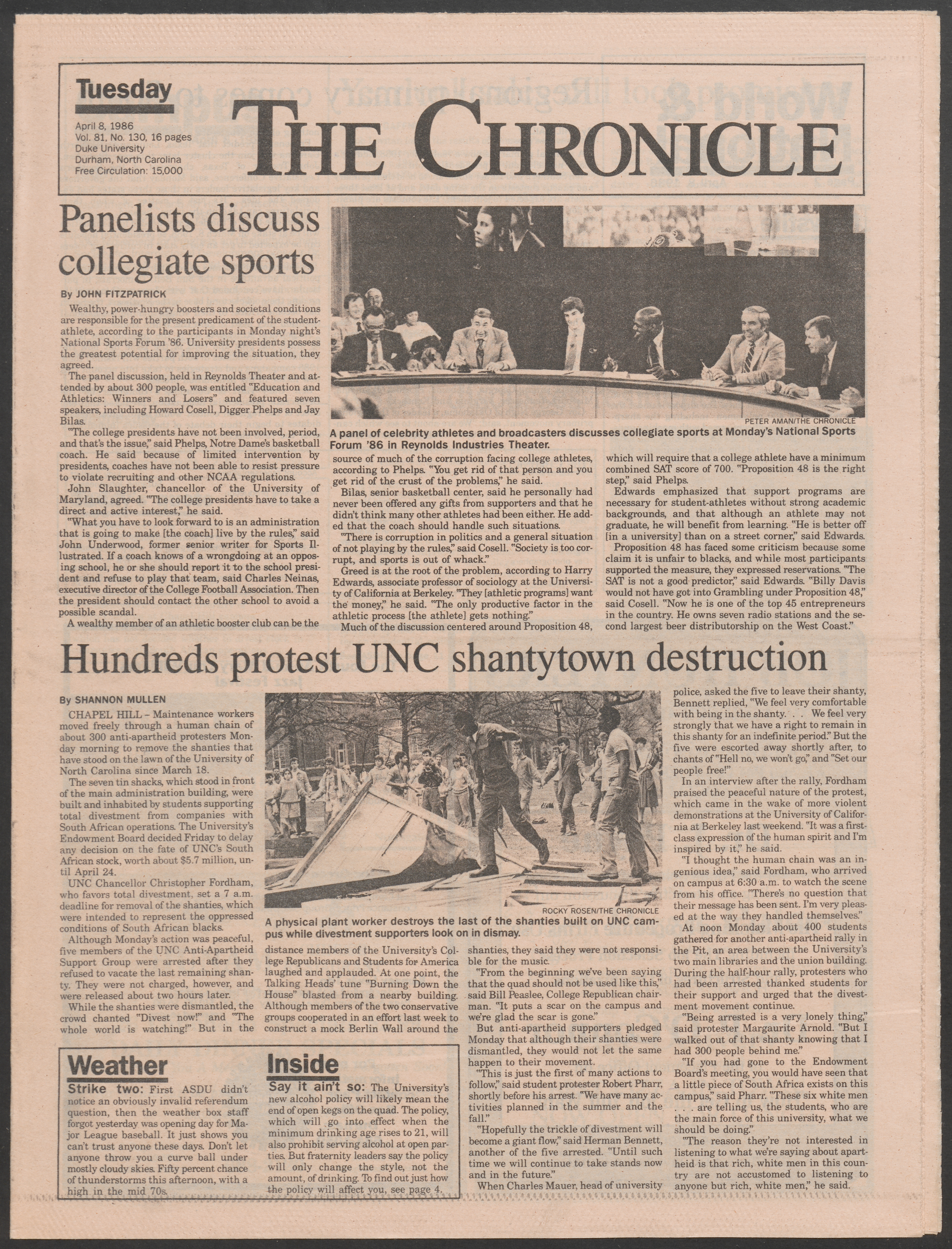
Cosell was on the headboard of the April 8, 1986 Duke Chronicle edition.

To produce this pioneering program, Cosell recruited a number of employees from outside the ranks of those that produced games, who he felt might be too invested in the success of the athletes and leagues to look at the hard news. He brought in Michael Marley, then a sportswriter for The Washington Post; Lawrie Mifflin, a writer for The New York Times; and a 20-year-old researcher who quickly rose to an associate producer, Alexis Denny. As a sophomore at Yale, Ms. Denny had been a student in a seminar that Cosell taught on the "Business of Big-Time Sports in America", and was selected by the Director of Monday Night Football to join their production crew. She took her junior year off to join Cosell's staff at ABC Headquarters in New York City, and produced many segments, including in 1983 a half-hour special report previewing the 1984 Olympic Games in Los Angeles. Despite the games being one of ABC's biggest investments, with a record-breaking $225 million rights fee at the time, the 30-minute documentary-style program produced by Denny showed many sides of the questions about the viability of the games themselves—from concerns about traffic, pollution and terrorism, to a look at how the sponsorship deals were structured.

In his 1985 autobiography, Cosell reflected on his highly diverse work, and concluded that the SportsBeat series had been his favorite.

== Non-sports-related appearances ==
Speaking of Everything was a long-running weekly public-affairs, culture, and celebrity interview program hosted by Cosell on the ABC Radio Network. Launched on ABC's flagship New York station WABC in the mid-1960s and distributed nationally through early 1992, the 30-minute weekly broadcast served as a non-sports companion to Cosell's daily five-minute sports commentary series, Speaking of Sports.

Origins and Format

After leaving his law practice to broadcast full-time in 1956, Cosell established his national voice via Speaking of Sports, his daily short-form radio commentary. Eager to expand his journalism beyond athletics and engage with broader political, legal, and cultural issues, Cosell created Speaking of Everything on WABC (770 AM) before the program was syndicated across hundreds of ABC Radio Network affiliates.

Unlike his rapid-fire daily sports reports, Speaking of Everything was formatted as a weekly, 30-minute long-form conversation and commentary broadcast. Affiliates frequently carried the program during weekend public-affairs blocks, where Cosell brought his legal training, formidable vocabulary, and probing, unscripted style to bear on national politics, social movements, literature, and entertainment.

Notable Guests and Cultural Impact

Over nearly three decades on the air, Speaking of Everything featured an eclectic roster of heads of state, politicians, journalists, authors, musicians, and entertainment icons:

Politicians, Journalists, and Authors:

Reflecting Cosell's lifelong interest in public policy and constitutional law, the program regularly hosted political figures and prominent writers, including Pulitzer Prize-winning journalists Jimmy Breslin and Sydney Schanberg (1985), CBS News White House correspondent Lesley Stahl (1988), and author Ken Auletta, whom Cosell interviewed at length in 1983 regarding his book The Underclass.

Entertainers and Cultural Icons:

On October 6, 1974, Cosell aired a landmark interview with former Beatle John Lennon to discuss music, politics, his ongoing U.S. immigration battle, and his album Walls and Bridges. Other major entertainment guests included comedian and filmmaker Jerry Lewis and late-night television host David Letterman.

Athletes in a Broader Social Context:

When athletes appeared on Speaking of Everything—most notably heavyweight champion Muhammad Ali, who sat for multiple installments from 1965 through the 1970s—the conversations transcended box scores to examine race, religion, the Vietnam War draft, and civil rights.

Television Adaptation and Final Broadcasts

In 1988, Cosell briefly adapted the concept into a late-night syndicated television talk show also titled Howard Cosell: Speaking of Everything, featuring guests such as David Letterman. While the television version was short-lived, the ABC Radio broadcast remained Cosell's most enduring professional platform. After leaving Monday Night Football following the 1983 season and stepping away from ABC Television in 1985, Cosell continued hosting both Speaking of Sports and Speaking of Everything on ABC Radio until his final retirement from broadcasting in January 1992 following chest cancer surgery. Cosell's colorful personality and distinctive voice were featured to fine comedic effect in several sports-themed episodes of the ABC TV series The Odd Couple. His feuds with New York City sportswriter Oscar Madison (Jack Klugman) mirrored the real life feuds he had with some of New York's leading sportswriters. He also appeared in the Woody Allen films Bananas, Sleeper and Broadway Danny Rose. Such was his celebrity that while he never appeared on the show, Cosell's name was frequently used as an all-purpose answer on the popular 1970s game show Match Game. Cosell also had a cameo appearance in the 1988 movie Johnny Be Good featuring Robert Downey Jr., Anthony Michael Hall and Uma Thurman. His particular speech pattern was also imitated by one of the characters in the film Better Off Dead.

Cosell's national fame was further boosted in fall 1975 when Saturday Night Live with Howard Cosell aired on Saturday evenings on ABC. This was an hour-long variety show, broadcast live from the Ed Sullivan Theater in New York City and hosted by Cosell, which is not to be confused with the NBC series Saturday Night Live (which coincidentally also premiered in 1975 under its original title of NBC's Saturday Night, to avoid confusion with Cosell's show). Despite bringing several unknown comedians, such as Billy Crystal, Christopher Guest, and future SNL star Bill Murray to national prominence and showcasing the American TV debut of the Bay City Rollers (who later had a hit song by the name of "Saturday Night"), Cosell's show was canceled after three months; the NBC show was officially renamed Saturday Night Live for the succeeding season and has retained the name ever since. Cosell later hosted the 1984–85 season finale of Saturday Night Live.

Cosell was the announcer of Frank Sinatra's 1974 ABC television special Sinatra – The Main Event.

Cosell appeared alongside Muhammad Ali, Frank Sinatra, Richie Havens, and others on a 1976 spoken word novelty record, The Adventures of Ali and His Gang vs. Mr. Tooth Decay.

Beginning in 1976, Cosell hosted a long-running series of specials known as Battle of the Network Stars. The two-hour specials pitted celebrities from each of the three broadcast networks against each other in various athletic competitions, including relay races, swimming relays, tug of war, an obstacle course, and a dunk tank. Some of the specials also featured other events, such as golf, kayak racing, three-on-three touch football, or Frisbee. Cosell conducted short interviews with the participants between events, and was seen laughing, joking, and clearly enjoying himself throughout each show. Of Cosell, the program's supervising producer Bill Garnet said in an interview, "Cosell loved doing the show. ... He used to say, 'I'm the biggest star out here. They all want to be around me!' But he loved doing the show." Actor LeVar Burton, who participated in 1977 and 1978, spoke warmly of having interacted with Cosell, describing his experience as "a great joy and one of my fondest memories. It's like being heckled by Don Rickles, you know? Having Cosell insult you or even just mention your name was the Holy Grail for me." Cosell hosted all but one of the nineteen specials, including the final episode which aired in 1988.

== Awards and Honors ==
In 1974, Cosell received a Primetime Emmy Award nomination for Outstanding Achievement in Sports Programming for his work on ABC's Monday Night Football. In 1977, he received the Golden Plate Award of the American Academy of Achievement. Beginning in 1981, Cosell hosted and executive-produced the investigative magazine program ABC SportsBeat, for which he and his production staff earned three Sports Emmy Awards for excellence in sports journalism.

In the final years of his life, Cosell received widespread institutional recognition across the broadcasting and sports journalism industries. In 1993, he was inducted into the National Sportscasters and Sportswriters Association Hall of Fame, the American Sportscasters Association Hall of Fame, and the International Jewish Sports Hall of Fame. That same year, TV Guide named Cosell "The All-Time Best Sportscaster" in its special issue celebrating 40 years of television. In 1994, he was inducted into the Television Academy Hall of Fame. In March 1995, shortly before his death, Cosell was honored with the Arthur Ashe Courage Award at the ESPY Awards in recognition of his journalistic advocacy and support of Muhammad Ali.

Cosell continued to receive major honors after his death. In 1996, he was posthumously awarded the "Sports Emmy Award for Lifetime Achievement", and TV Guide ranked him number 47 on its list of the "50 Greatest TV Stars of All Time." He was subsequently inducted into the Sports Broadcasting Hall of Fame in 2007 and into the Observer category of the International Boxing Hall of Fame in 2010.

== Criticism of boxing ==
Cosell denounced professional boxing during the broadcast of a November 26, 1982, WBC heavyweight championship bout between titleholder Larry Holmes and a clearly outmatched Randall "Tex" Cobb at the Astrodome. The fight was held two weeks after the fatal fight between Ray Mancini and Kim Duk-koo, when Kim died shortly after the fight. Cosell famously asked the rhetorical question, "I wonder if that referee [Steve Crosson] understands that he is constructing an advertisement for the abolition of the very sport that he's a part of?" Cosell, horrified over the brutality of the one-sided fight, said that if the referee did not stop the fight he would never broadcast a professional fight again.

Major boxing reforms were later implemented, the most important of which allows referees to stop clearly one-sided fights early in order to protect the health of the fighters. In amateur boxing, one-sided fights would be automatically stopped if one fighter had a score considerably higher than his opponent. Up until that point, only the ring physician had the authority to halt a bout. Another change was the reduction of championship bouts from fifteen rounds to twelve rounds by the WBC. (The fatal blows to Kim were in rounds thirteen and fourteen.) The WBA quickly followed suit, and the IBF did so in 1988. Cosell did not cut off ties with the United States Amateur Boxing Federation. His 1984 broadcasts of the Olympic Trials, box-offs, and the 1984 Summer Olympics boxing tournament, all of which were at the amateur level with much shorter fights, were his last professional calls of the sport.

== I Never Played the Game and reaction ==
After Cosell's memoir I Never Played the Game, which, among other things, chronicled his disenchantment with fellow ABC commentators, was published in September 1985, Cosell was taken off scheduled announcing duties for that year's World Series and was dismissed by ABC television shortly thereafter. Cosell's book was seen by many as a bitter "hate rant" against those who had offended him. TV Guide published excerpts of his memoirs and reported that they had never had as many viewers' responses and they were overwhelmingly negative towards Cosell. The magazine reported some of the "printable" ones saying things such as "Will Rogers never met Howard Cosell".

In I Never Played the Game, Cosell popularized the word "jockocracy" (originally coined by author Robert Lipsyte), describing how athletes were given announcing jobs that they had not earned. Coincidentally, he was replaced for the 1985 World Series broadcast by Tim McCarver, himself a former baseball player, to join Al Michaels and Jim Palmer. (The title of the book is a double entendre, meaning that Cosell never actually played the game of football or any other professional sport he broadcast, as well as implying that he never played the "game" of corporate politics.) Cosell is notably absent from the Pro Football Hall of Fame. However, he was recently nominated as a semifinalist for the class of 2025 for the bronze bust and gold jacket.

In his later years, Cosell briefly hosted his own television talk show, Speaking of Everything, authored his last book (What's Wrong With Sports), and continued to appear on radio and television, becoming more outspoken about his criticisms of sports in general.

== Later life ==
In 1993, Cosell was inducted into the International Jewish Sports Hall of Fame. A year later, in 1994, he was inducted into the Television Hall of Fame. He was also the 1995 recipient of the Arthur Ashe Courage Award. After his wife of 46 years, Mary Edith Abrams (also known as Emmy Cosell) died from a heart attack in 1990, Cosell largely withdrew from the public eye and his health began failing. A longtime smoker, he was diagnosed with lung cancer in 1991, and had surgery to remove a cancerous tumor in his chest. He also had several minor strokes, and was diagnosed with heart, kidney and Parkinson's diseases.

== Illness, death, and tributes ==
Following the death of his wife of 46 years, Mary Edith "Emmy" Abrams Cosell, from a heart attack in November 1990, a bereaved Cosell largely withdrew from public life. A longtime cigar and cigarette smoker, Cosell was diagnosed with lung cancer in 1991 and underwent surgery in June of that year to remove a cancerous tumor from his chest. Six months after the operation, in January 1992, he retired completely from his remaining ABC Radio commitments. In his final years, Cosell suffered several minor strokes, developed Parkinson's disease, and experienced progressive heart and kidney ailments that required frequent hospitalizations.

After spending the final months of his life hospitalized, Cosell died at 3:00 a.m. on April 23, 1995, at New York University's Hospital for Joint Diseases in Manhattan from a cardiac embolism at the age of 77. His death was announced by his grandson, Justin Cohane. He was survived by his two daughters, Jill and Hilary, and five grandchildren.

Cosell's death prompted tributes from prominent figures across sports, journalism, and entertainment. Heavyweight boxing champion Muhammad Ali, whose career and public rapport with Cosell spanned three decades, released a statement saying, "Howard Cosell was a good man, and he lived a good life. I have been interviewed by many people, but I have enjoyed the interviews by Howard Cosell the best. He always put on a good show. I hope to meet him one day in the hereafter. I can hear Howard Cosell now saying, 'Muhammad, you are not the man you used to be.'" Former ABC Sports president Roone Arledge praised Cosell's transformative impact on broadcasting, stating, "He became a giant by the simple act of telling the truth in an industry that was not used to hearing it and considered it revolutionary." Longtime ABC Radio sports director Shelby Whitfield remarked that Cosell "brought a new dimension to sports reporting. He was a showman and a journalist and a person always sensitive to the underdog."

=== Funeral, memorial service, and burial ===
Following his death in Manhattan, funeral arrangements were handled by the Frank E. Campbell Funeral Chapel on the Upper East Side, followed by a private burial service. Comedian Billy Crystal, who had frequently impersonated both Cosell and Muhammad Ali on television, sat beside Ali during the closed-casket service. As Crystal later recounted during his eulogy at Ali's 2016 memorial service, Ali leaned over during the service, pointed toward the closed casket, and whispered, "Do you think he's wearing his hairpiece?" When Crystal replied that he did not think so, Ali asked, "So how will God recognize him?"—to which Crystal answered, "Champ, as soon as God hears him, he'll recognize him."

On May 25, 1995, a larger private memorial service was held at the Church of St. Paul and St. Andrew on the Upper West Side of Manhattan, drawing politicians, athletes, broadcasting executives, and entertainers, including Ali, sports artist LeRoy Neiman, Rachel Robinson (widow of Jackie Robinson), and Oakland Raiders owner Al Davis. At the service, Rachel Robinson described Cosell as possessing "grace disguised by bluster," while Davis praised him as "one of the great people who inspired my imagination," adding, "He was born with great talent and he did put it to use." His grandchildren remembered him affectionately as "Poppy," a soft-hearted grandfather who enjoyed snacking on Mallomars and slipping them pocket money, while his daughter Jill delivered the family eulogy, after which a tearful Ali consoled her in the pews.

Cosell was interred alongside his wife Emmy at Westhampton Cemetery in Westhampton, New York, on Long Island, near the Westhampton Beach summer residence the couple had maintained for decades. Their plot is marked by an understated granite family headstone inscribed solely with the surname "COSELL" and their respective names and dates.

== Legacy and Cultural Impact ==
Cosell was placed as number one on David J. Halberstam's list of "Top 50 All Time Network Television Sports Announcers" on Yahoo! Sports in January 2009. The sports complex at the Hebrew University in Jerusalem was named for Cosell. In 2010, Cosell was posthumously inducted into the Observer's Category in the International Boxing Hall of Fame.

Cosell appears in several scenes in Woody Allen's 1971 film Bananas.

In Woody Allen's 1973 comedy Sleeper, Allen's character Miles Monroe, who has been revived after 200 years in cryogenic suspension, is shown an excerpt of an ABC Wide World of Sports broadcast in which Cosell talks about Muhammad Ali. One of the scientists who has revived Miles, unsure of what the video means, says that the theory is that watching Cosell was a form of punishment for crimes committed against the state 200 years in the past. Miles Monroe agrees. "Yes, that's exactly what that was."

In the 1985 film Better Off Dead, one of the two Asian-American teenage brothers who regularly challenged John Cusack's character to a street race is said to have learned English from listening to Cosell. The band Ben Folds Five has a song titled "Boxing" from 1995, which was written as a fictional monologue from Muhammad Ali to Cosell.

In the 1995 song "My Mind Went Blank", Cosell is used as a metaphor by Point Blank for a person who spreads other people's business around.

In Michael Mann's 2001 film Ali, Cosell is played by Jon Voight, who earned an Academy Award nomination for his performance. In the 2002 television film Monday Night Mayhem, Cosell was played by John Turturro.

Cosell's daughter, Hilary Cosell, was a producer of NBC SportsWorld and was one of the first women sports producers. She was also the senior producer of her father's show, Speaking of Everything with Howard Cosell, an assistant producer of ABC News's 20/20, and received four Emmy Award nominations.

Cosell's nephew Greg Cosell is a senior producer at NFL Films. Cosell's grandson Colin Cosell was named public address announcer (along with Marysol Castro) at Citi Field, home of the New York Mets, in 2018. Colin Cosell intended to honor his grandfather by enunciating Mets' third baseman Todd Frazier's last name the same way Cosell did with Joe Frazier's name in his famous "Down Goes Frazier!" call.

== Filmography ==
Year	Title	Role	Notes
1971	Bananas	Himself	
1971	Nanny and the Professor	Miles Taylor	Episode: "Sunday's Hero"
1971	The Partridge Family	Himself	Episode: "What Happened To Moby Dick?"
1972	Fol-de-Rol	The Storyteller	TV movie
1972-1975	The Odd Couple	Himself	2 episodes
1973	The World's Greatest Athlete	Announcer	
1973	Sleeper	Himself in archival footage	
1976	Two-Minute Warning	Himself	
1983	The Fall Guy	Commentator	Voice, Episode: "Win One for the Gipper???"
1984	Broadway Danny Rose	Himself	
1986	Tall Tales & Legends	Ernie	Episode: "Cassie and the Bats"
1988	Johnny Be Good	Himself	
