= Schneider Family Book Award =

Literary award for portrayal of disabilities in youth books

- Awarded for: artistic expression of the disability experience for child and adolescent audiences
- Country: United States
- Presented by: American Library Association
- First award: 2004
- Website: ala.org/awardsgrants/schneider-family-book-award

The Schneider Family Book Award is an award given by the American Library Association (ALA) recognizing authors and illustrators for the excellence of portrayal of the disability experience in literature for youth. There is a category for children's books, books appealing to middle grade readers, and for young adult literature. The award has been given since 2004.

The award was founded by Dr. Katherine Schneider, the first blind student to graduate from the Kalamazoo Public School system. Schneider had been helped through school as a child by a librarian at the Michigan Library for the Blind who provided books in Braille to her.

The awards are given out annually and the winners are announced with the ALA’s Youth Media Awards.

A study of the awards has been conducted by Sarah Dornback.

== Criteria ==
- The person with the disability may be the protagonist or a secondary character.
- Definition of disability: Dr. Schneider has intentionally allowed for a broad interpretation by her wording, the book "must portray some aspect of living with a disability, whether the disability is physical, mental, or emotional." This allows each committee to decide on the qualifications of particular titles.
- Books with death as the main theme are generally disqualified.
- The books must be published in English.
- The award may be given posthumously.
- Term of eligibility extends to publications from the preceding year.
- Books previously discussed and voted on are not eligible again.

== Winners ==
Schneider Family Book Award
Year	Category	Recipient	Title	Citation	Reference
2004	Young Children	Glenna Lang	Looking Out For Sarah	Winner	
2004	Middle Grade	Wendy Mass	A Mango Shaped Space	Winner	
2004	Young Adult	Andrew Clements	Things Not Seen	Winner	
2005	Young Children	Diane Bertrand Gonzales, illustrated by Robert L. Sweetland	My Pal Victor/Mi amigo, Victor	Winner	
2005	Middle Grade	Pam Muñoz Ryan	Becoming Naomi León	Winner	
2005	Young Adult	Samantha Abeel	My Thirteenth Winter: A Memoir	Winner	
2006	Young Children	Myron Uhlberg, illustrated by Colin Bootman	Dad, Jackie and Me	Winner	
2006	Middle Grade	Kimberly Fusco Newton	Tending to Grace	Winner	
2006	Young Adult	Adam Rapp	Under the Wolf, Under the Dog	Winner	
2007	Young Children	Paul DuBois and Pete Seeger, illustrated by R. Gregory Christie	The Deaf Musicians	Winner	
2007	Middle Grade	Cynthia Lord	Rules	Winner	
2007	Young Adult	Louis Sachar	Small Steps	Winner	
2008	Young Children	Andrea Stenn Stryer, illustrated by Bert Dodson	Kami and the Yaks	Winner	
2008	Middle Grade	Tracie Vaughn Zimmer	Reaching for Sun	Winner	
2008	Young Adult	Ginny Rorby	Hurt Go Happy	Winner	
2009	Young Children	Robert Andrew Parker	Piano Starts Here: The Young Art Tatum	Winner	
2009	Middle Grade	Leslie Connor	Waiting for Normal	Winner	
2009	Young Adult	Jonathan Friesen	Jerk, California	Winner	
2010	Young Children	Bonnie Christensen	Django	Winner	
2010	Middle Grade	Nora Raleigh Baskin	Anything But Typical	Winner	
2010	Young Adult	Francisco X. Stork	Marcelo in the Real World	Winner	
2011	Young Children	George Ella Lyon, illustrated by Lynne Avril	The Pirate of Kindergarten	Winner	
2011	Middle Grade	Jordan Sonnenblick	After Ever After	Winner	
2011	Young Adult	Antony John	Five Flavors of Dumb	Winner	
2012	Young Children	No award given	No award given	None	
2012	Middle Grade	Joan Bauer	Close to Famous	Winner	
2012	Middle Grade	Brian Selznick	Wonderstruck	Winner	
2012	Young Adult	Wendelin Van Draanen	The Running Dream	Winner	
2013	Young Children	Claire Alexander	Back to Front and Upside Down!	Winner	
2013	Middle Grade	Sarah Lean	A Dog Called Homeless	Winner	
2013	Young Adult	Harry Mazer and Peter Lerangis	Somebody, Please Tell Me Who I Am	Winner	
2014	Young Children	Jen Bryant and illustrated by Melissa Sweet	A Splash of Red: The Life and Art of Horace Pippin	Winner	
2014	Middle Grade	Merrie Haskell	Handbook for Dragon Slayers	Winner	
2014	Young Adult	Elizabeth Wein	Rose Under Fire	Winner	
2015	Young Children	Alan Rabinowitz, illustrated by Catia Chien	A Boy and a Jaguar	Winner	
2015	Middle Grade	Ann M. Martin	Rain Reign	Winner	
2015	Young Adult	Gail Giles	Girls Like Us	Winner	
2016	Young Children	Laurie Ann Thompson, illustrated by Sean Qualls	Emmanuel's Dream: The True Story of Emmanuel Ofosu Yeboah	Winner	
2016	Middle Grade	Lynda Mullaly Hunt	Fish in a Tree	Winner	
2016	Middle Grade	Kimberly Brubaker Bradley	The War That Saved My Life	Winner	
2016	Young Adult	Teresa Toten	The Unlikely Hero of Room 13B	Winner	
2017	Young Children	Jen Bryant, illustrated by Boris Kulikov	Six Dots: A Story of Young Louis Braille	Winner	
2017	Middle Grade	Jason Reynolds	As Brave As You	Winner	
2017	Young Adult	Emery Lord	When We Collided	Winner	
2018	Young Children	Allen Say	Silent Days, Silent Dreams	Winner	
2018	Middle Grade	Shari Green	Macy McMillan and the Rainbow Goddess	Winner	
2018	Young Adult	Whitney Gardner	You're Welcome, Universe	Winner	
2019	Young Children	Jessica Kensky and Patrick Downes, illustrated by Scott Magoon	Rescue and Jessica: A Life-Changing Friendship	Winner	
2019	Young Children	Jessie Oliveros, illustrated by Dana Wulfekotte	The Remember Balloons	Honor	
2019	Middle Grade	Leslie Connor	The Truth as Told by Mason Buttle	Winner	
2019	Middle Grade	Jacqueline West	The Collectors	Honor	
2019	Young Adult	Mark Oshiro	Anger is a Gift	Winner	
2019	Young Adult	Kelly Jensen (ed.)	(Don't) Call Me Crazy: 33 Voices Start the Conversation About Mental Health	Honor	
2020	Young Children	Sonia Sotomayor, illustrated by Rafael López	Just Ask! Be Different, Be Brave, Be You	Winner	
2020	Young Children	Jenn Bailey, illustrated by Mika Song	A Friend For Henry	Honor	
2020	Middle Grade	Kelly Lynne	Song for a Whale	Winner	
2020	Middle Grade	Pablo Cartaya	Each Tiny Spark	Honor	
2020	Young Adult	Karol Ruth Silverstein	Cursed	Winner	
2020	Young Adult	Alison Gervais	The Silence Between Us	Honor	
2021	Young Children	Jordan Scott, illustrated by Sydney Smith	I Talk Like a River	Winner	
2021	Young Children	Annette Bay Pimentel, illustrated by Nabi H. Ali	All the Way to the Top: How One Girl's Fight for Americans with Disabilities Changed Everything	Honor	
2021	Young Children	Tracy Newman, illustrated by Abigail Halpin	Itzhak: A Boy who Loved the Violin	Honor	
2021	Middle Grade	Ann Clare LeZotte	Show Me a Sign	Winner	
2021	Middle Grade	Sarah Kapit	Get a Grip, Vivy Cohen!	Honor	
2021	Middle Grade	Victoria Jamieson and Omar Mohamed, illustrated by Victoria Jamieson, color by Iman Geddy	When Stars Are Scattered	Honor	
2021	Young Adult	I. W. Gregorio	This Is My Brain In Love	Winner	
2022	Young Children	Darren Lebeuf, illustrated by Ashley Barro	My City Speaks	Winner	
2022	Young Children	Hudson Talbott	A Walk in the Words	Honor	
2022	Young Children	Bahram Rahman, illustrated by Peggy Collins	A Sky-Blue Bench	Honor	
2022	Middle Grade	Alison Green Myers	A Bird Will Soar	Winner	
2022	Middle Grade	Jason Reynolds, illustrated by Raúl the Third	Stuntboy, in the Meantime	Honor	
2022	Middle Grade	Elle McNicoll	A Kind of Spark	Honor	
2022	Young Adult	Asphyxia	Words in My Hands	Winner	
2022	Young Adult	Ariel Henley	A Face for Picasso: Coming of Age with Crouzon Syndrome	Honor	
2023	Young Children	Shannon Stocker, illustrated by Devon Holzwarth	Listen: How Evelyn Glennie, a Deaf Girl, Changed Percussion	Winner	
2023	Young Children	Erin Hourigan	In the Blue	Honor	
2023	Middle Grade	C. C. Harrington	WILDOAK	Winner	
2023	Middle Grade	Natalie Lloyd	Hummingbird	Honor	
2023	Middle Grade	Gillian Dunn	Honestly Elliott	Honor	
2023	Young Adult	Erin Stewart	The Words We Keep	Winner	
2023	Young Adult	Natalia Sylvester	Breathe and Count Back from Ten	Honor	
2024	Young Children	Jenn Bailey, illustrated by Mika Song	Henry, Like Always	Winner	
2024	Young Children	Joanna Que and Charina Marquez, illustrated by Fran Alvarez	Dancing Hands	Honor	
2024	Young Children	James Catchpole, illustrated by Karen George	What Happened to You?	Honor	
2024	Middle Grade	Sally J. Pla	The Fire, the Water, and Maudie McGinn	Winner	
2024	Middle Grade	Meg Eden Kuyatt	Good Different	Honor	
2024	Middle Grade	Erin Bow	Simon Sort of Says	Honor	
2024	Young Adult	Mariama J. Lockington	Forever Is Now	Winner	
2024	Young Adult	Claire Forrest	Where You See Yourself	Honor	
2024	Young Adult	Mazey Eddings	Tilly in Technicolor	Honor	
2025	Young Children	Sarah Kurpiel	A Little Like Magic	Winner	
2025	Young Children	Karen Kane and Jonaz McMillan, illustrated by Dion MBD	Monster Hands	Honor	
2025	Young Children	James and Lucy Catchpole, illustrated by Karen George	You're So Amazing!	Honor	
2025	Middle Grade	Rob Harrell	Popcorn	Winner	
2025	Middle Grade	John Schu	Louder Than Hunger	Honor	
2025	Middle Grade	Sherri Winston	Shark Teeth	Honor	
2025	Young Adult	Maya Van Wagenen	Chronically Dolores	Winner	
2025	Young Adult	Lauren Seal	Light Enough to Float	Honor	
2025	Young Adult	Anna Sortino	On the Bright Side	Honor	
2026	Young Children	Amy Hansen and Wanda Díaz-Merced, illustrated by Rocio Arreola Mendoza	Wanda Hears the Stars	Winner	
2026	Young Children	Elana K. Arnold, illustrated by Charles Santoso	Bat and the Business of Ferrets	Honor	
2026	Young Children	Janice Milusich, illustrated by Chris Raschka	I Hear the Snow, I Smell the Sea	Honor	
2026	Middle Grade	Alyssa Colman	Where Only Storms Grow	Winner	
2026	Middle Grade	Bobbie Pyron	Octopus Moon	Honor	
2026	Middle Grade	Saadia Faruqi	The Strongest Heart	Honor	
2026	Young Adult	James Robinson, illustrated by Brian Rea	Whale Eyes	Winner	
2026	Young Adult	Sonido Reyes	The Golden Boy's Guide to Bipolar	Honor	
2026	Young Adult	Heidi E. Y. Stemple	The Poetry of Car Mechanics	Honor	
