= Cynthia Lord =

American children's author

Cynthia Lord is an American author of children's literature. Her debut novel Rules was published by Scholastic, Inc. in 2006, and was a 2007 Newbery Honor book and winner of the Schneider Family Book Award.

== Early life ==
Lord was born in Massachusetts and grew up in New Hampshire.

In college, Lord had some short stories published, and won a contest with one.

== Personal life ==
Lord lives with her husband and their two children, one of whom has autism, in Brunswick, Maine.

== Awards ==
- 2007 Newbery Honor Book
- 2007 Schneider Family Book Award

== Works ==
=== Novels ===
- Rules, Scholastic, 2007, ISBN 978-0-545-03640-5
- Touch Blue, Scholastic, 2010. ISBN 978-0-545-03531-6
- Half a Chance, Scholastic, 2014. ISBN 978-0-545-03533-0
- A Handful of Stars, Scholastic, 2015. ISBN 978-0-545-70027-6
- Because of the Rabbit, Scholastic, 2019. ISBN 978-05-459-1424-6

=== Hot Rod Hamster early reader books ===
- Hot Rod Hamster, Scholastic, 2010. ISBN 978-0-545-03530-9
- Happy Birthday Hamster, Scholastic, 2011. ISBN 978-0-545-25522-6
- Monster Truck Mania, Scholastic, 2014. ISBN 978-0-545-46261-7
- Hot Rod Hamster and the Wacky Whatever Race, Scholastic, 2014. ISBN 978-0-545-69442-1
- Hod Rod Hamster and the Halloween Party, Scholastic, 2015. ISBN 978-0-545-81529-1

=== Shelter Pet Squad series ===
- Jelly Bean, Scholastic, 2014. ISBN 978-0-545-63596-7
- Merlin, Scholastic, 2015. ISBN 978-0-545-63600-1
- Paloma, Scholastic, 2016. ISBN 978-0-545-63604-9

=== Picture book ===
- Borrowing Bunnies: A Surprising True Tale of Fostering Rabbits, Farrar, Straus and Giroux Young Readers, 2019. ISBN 978-03-743-0841-4

== Interviews ==
- Author's Talk, Megan McCarthy
- Interview: Cynthia Lord, Bildungsroman, April 3, 2006
- 2008 Audio Interview of Cynthia Lord
- An Interview With Debut Author, Cynthia Lord, Debbi Michiko Florence
- Author Interview: Cynthia Lord on Rules, cynsations, March 10, 2006
