= Rescue and Jessica =

2018 picture book

- Author: Jessica Kensky and Patrick Downes
- Illustrator: Scott Magoon
- Publisher: Candlewick Press
- Publication date: April 3, 2018
- Pages: 33
- ISBN: 978-0763696047

Rescue and Jessica: A Life-Changing Friendship is a 2018 picture book written by married couple Jessica Kensky and Patrick Downes and illustrated by Scott Magoon. It follows a girl named Jessica, loosely based on the author, and her service dog Rescue, whom she received after the amputation of one and later both her legs.

== Summary ==
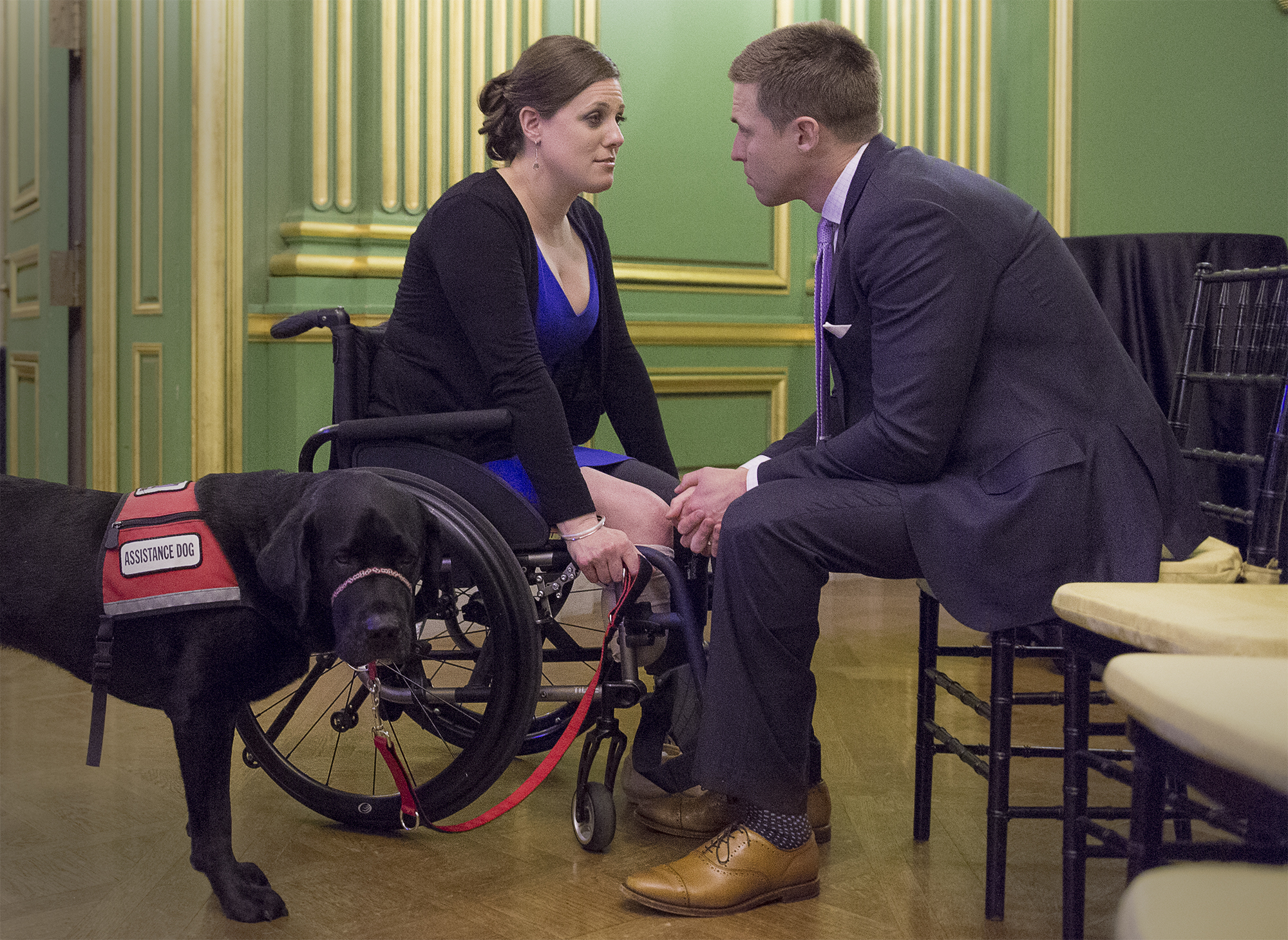
Co-authors Jessica Kensky and Patrick Downes, with Kensky's service dog Rescue (the inspiration for the story)

Rescue, a black labrador retriever, is trained to be a seeing eye dog, but is later deemed unsuited for the role and is re-trained to be a more general service dog. He is assigned to a young girl named Jessica, who is recovering after her left leg was badly damaged and needed to be amputated, the cause of which is not specified in the story. Eventually, the condition of her other leg worsens and it is amputated as well. As Rescue assists her through both her initial and second recovery, the two form a close bond. The book also features an author's note explaining how both the real Jessica Kensky and Patrick Downes became amputees as adults after being injured in the 2013 Boston Marathon Bombing and how they acquired Rescue through NEADS Inc..

== Reception ==
Kirkus Reviews noted how Rescue and Jessica focused on the positive aspects of Jessica and Rescue's relationship rather the difficult parts of Jessica's recovery, and concluded that the book was "a gentle introduction to service dogs and acquired disability," though they pointed out a page where the text and illustrations did not match up. Reviewing the audiobook narrated by John McDonough, they described McDonough's performance as "rich and warm." Publishers Weekly stated the work "affectingly weave[s] fact and fiction."

Rescue and Jessica won the 2019 Schneider Family Book Award for Young Children.
