= Jim MacLaren =

American author and motivational speaker (1963–2010)

- Born: April 13, 1963; St. Louis, Missouri, U.S.
- Died: August 31, 2010 (aged 47)
- Education: Yale University (BA, MFA)
- Occupation: Motivational speaker
- Website: JimMacLaren.com

James E. MacLaren (April 13, 1963 – August 31, 2010) was a motivational speaker and author, noted for his record-breaking performances in the marathon and Ironman triathlon after having his left leg amputated below the knee.

MacLaren was a standout athlete in football and lacrosse at Yale University. Even before attending Yale, he was a leading athlete at Vermont Academy. In 1985, at the age of 22, MacLaren lost his left leg below the knee in a motorcycle accident, and required defibrillation. He recovered, and went on to run a marathon in 3 hours and 16 minutes, and to finish the Ironman Hawaii in 10 hours and 42 minutes.

In 1993, during the Orange County Triathlon, MacLaren was struck by a van during the bike portion of the race and collided with a signpost, rendering him a quadriplegic.

MacLaren's accident inspired members of the running community to raise funds to allow him to purchase a van he could drive with his hands. The fundraising efforts exceeded the necessary amount, leading to the establishment of the Challenged Athletes Foundation to support other disabled athletes.

Once again, MacLaren recovered, and used a wheelchair. He later worked as a motivational speaker and author.

He was awarded the Arthur Ashe Courage Award at the 2005 ESPY Awards presentation. He died on August 31, 2010, in his sleep.
