= Lynda Mullaly Hunt =

American children's fiction author

- Occupation: Author
- Writing career
- Notable awards: Schneider Family Book Award
- Website: https://lyndamullalyhunt.com/

Lynda Mullaly Hunt is an American children's fiction author. She is best known for her books One for the Murphys, Fish in a Tree, and Shouting at the Rain.

== Early life ==
Hunt grew up in Connecticut. She has stated that she didn't enjoy reading as a child and struggled in school. Her sixth grade teacher, Mr. Christy, helped her to develop self confidence and a love of reading. This experience inspired her second novel, Fish in a Tree.

== Career ==
Hunt was a teacher for third grade and sixth grade for several years while living in Connecticut, and then took a break from teaching to take care of her children. During that time, she joined a writer's group and began writing for the first time.

Hunt's first novel was One for the Murphys. It follows Carley Connors, a twelve-year-old in foster care, as she navigates her relationship with her foster family and biological mother. It received a starred review from Kirkus Reviews.

Hunt's second novel, Fish in a Tree, centers on Ally Nickerson, a sixth grader with undiagnosed dyslexia, as she struggles to adapt to a new school. Fish in a Tree is a New York Times Bestseller and received the Schneider Family Book Award. A review by Publishers Weekly described it as a book that "leans heavily on familiar types" but nevertheless said "Ally’s growth and relationships feel organic and real."

Hunt's third novel is Shouting at the Rain. It follows twelve-year-old Delsie McHill, a Cape Cod native, as she makes new friends and deals with the challenge of being raised by her grandmother. Cape Cod plays a central role in the book.

She also wrote a picture book, Wish in a Tree, which follows a character mentioned in Fish in a Tree. It was illustrated by Nancy Carpenter. Kirkus Reviews described it as "affirming and uplifting."

== Publications ==
- One for the Murphys (2012)
- Fish in a Tree (2015)
- Shouting at the Rain (2019)
- Wish in a Tree (2025)
- How to Build a Miracle (2027, in press)
