= David Cullen (basketball) =

Northern Irish former basketball player

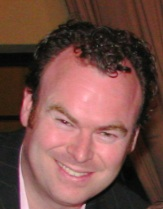
David Cullen

David Cullen (born 1969) is a Northern Irish former basketball player who currently assists the organisation Crossover Basketball with its work in Northern Ireland.

Dave also works with Ormeau Road Boxing Club as Secretary and Fundraiser.

Cullen was born in Belfast, Northern Ireland. He attended and worked for Queen's University Belfast.

== Basketball career ==
Dave started playing basketball in the senior leagues for Team Smithwicks at 16 years old, but had to pretend he was 18 to be available for selection. He them moved to Star of the Sea at age 20 who compete in the Irish Super League, the top level of basketball in Ireland which involves professional players brought in from America.

At age 25, David moved to the newly founded Queens Basketball Club. He also enrolled as a mature student at Queen's, which enabled him to play for the varsities team. This led to David twice representing the Northern Ireland Universities basketball team at the BUCS games. It was through the varsity team that David met Sean Tuohey and became involved with Peace Players International (formally Playing For Peace). Dave currently works as an advisor to various basketball/boxing clubs/organizations in Ireland and the USA.

Cullen has signed for new team Belfast Cranes for the 2014–15 season.

In June 2026 Dave married Georgie whom he lives with in Carryduff. Dave has four grown up children.

== Queen's Invitational Basketball Tournament ==
David is the organiser of the largest pre-season basketball tournament in Northern Ireland, The Queen's Invitational Basketball Tournament (formerly known as the Errigle Inn Invitational tournament). The Tournament has been up and running for over 5 years now and clubs such as Star of the Sea, Tolka Rovers and North Star Basketball Club have lifted the trophy. Teams from England, Cyprus and America have attended the competition. In 2008 Cleveland Cavaliers general manager Danny Ferry helped finance the Cyprus team's trip to Belfast to participate in the tournament. In 2010 the tournament sponsored by ESPN was won by the Belfast Tropics.

== Arthur Ashe Courage Award ==
On Wednesday 11 July 2007, David Cullen and Trevor Ringland received the Arthur Ashe Courage Award at the 2007 ESPY awards for their work with PeacePlayers International.

Previous recipients of the Award include Muhammad Ali, Dean Smith, Billie Jean King, Tommie Smith and John Carlos and in 2009 Nelson Mandella.

== Notes ==
- David is also a published poet, having contributed a poem to the book "You Can't Eat Flags For Breakfast"
- David has been added to the Streetball Ireland Hall of Fame
- Dave has his own fan site on BEBO called "The Dave Cullen Amazed and Bewildered Society"
- David has appeared as a studio guest on Channel 5's NBA show.
- Dave Cullen is currently working as Secretary and Fundraiser to Ormeau Road Boxing Club. https://www.facebook.com/pages/Ormeau-Road-Boxing-Club/574775295977799
- Ormeau Road Boxing Club is a cross community sporting organisation bringing together people of all ages in the Ormeau Road area with a view to getting fit, learning to box and most important learning to recognise that they have to share the area and not just cohabitate.
