= Challenged Athletes Foundation =

American non-profit organization

- Founded: 1994; 32 years ago
- Founders: Jeffrey Essakow, Bob Babbitt and Rick Kozlowski
- Type: 501(c)(3) Non-profit
- Tax ID no.: 33-0739596
- Location(s): 9591 Waples Street; San Diego, CA
- Revenue: $3,695,032
- Endowment: $425,000
- Website: challengedathletes.org

The Challenged Athletes Foundation (CAF), established in 1997, assists, supports, and provides opportunity to people with physical challenges, so that they can lead active lifestyles and compete in athletic events. It is founded in the belief that involvement in sports at any level increases self-esteem, encourages independence and enhances quality of life. The Foundation does this by providing funding for training, competition, rehabilitation, and equipment for the challenged athletes.

The Challenged Athletes Foundation is divided into four different programs: Access for Athletes, Operation Rebound, Catch a Rising Star, and Project N.Ex.T., all of which focus on the betterment of disabled athletes, but vary in their target group. Access for Athletes is the flagship program of CAF.

== History ==
Challenged Athletes Foundation was founded in 1997 in response to below-knee-amputee endurance racer Jim MacLaren who suffered an accident while competing in a triathlon. In June 1993, while competing in a triathlon in Orange County, California, MacLaren was on his bike when a van went through a closed intersection, hit the back of the bike and propelled him into a pole. When he arrived at the hospital he was told that he was a quadriplegic and would never move again from the waist down. The foundation was created by MacLaren as well as friends and co-founders Bob Babbitt, Jeffrey Essakow, and Rick Kozlowski.

In 2023 CAF-Idaho opened their new headquarters in Boise. The foundation helps community members fund grands for competition costs, training, and equipment.

== Events ==
The Challenged Athletes Foundation holds a number of high-profile fund raising events in order to raise money to support disabled athletes to compete in sports. These include CAF events with the San Diego Triathlon Challenge; Million Dollar Challenge; Heroes, Heart and Hope Gala held at the Waldorf Astoria in New York City; Hawaii Revisited; Tour de Cove; Rock on the Green, and numerous other events under the banner of Race for a Reason. For its 30th anniversary, the CAF held in evening of gratitude for its community and supporters and the event supported Operation Rebound. As of 2025 CAF has raised over $191 million and has awarded over 52,000 grants to athletes.

== Athletes ==
The Challenged Athletes Foundation has enabled a number of disabled athletes to get to the starting line. Amongst these are Sarah Reinertsen who was the first female leg amputee to complete the Ironman Triathlon World Championships in Kona, Hawaii and a World Marathon Challenge Finisher.

Other well-known challenged athletes include:

- Emmanuel Ofosu Yeboah
- Rudy Garcia-Tolson
- Evan Strong
- Rodrick Sewell
- Haven Shepherd
- Hunter Woodhall
- Patty Collins
- Kelly Ray
- Breezy Bochenek
- Alex Parra
- Ezra Frech
