= SportsBeat =

SportsBeat is a regular segment on ESPN Radio that provides a concise (2 minute) overview of the sports world. Hosted by Dari Nowkhah, it airs Monday through Friday in the afternoons, specifically at the bottom of the hour (:57-:00 minutes), The segment includes Nowkhah's opinions on relevant sports topics, separated by a commercial break in the :58 minute. It features an insightful capsule of the major breaking news of the day and a preview of the night ahead. It is heard on over 472 plus affiliates across the United States and Canada.

On January 1, 2004, Tirico assumed the role as voice of ESPN Radio's weekday afternoon drivetime SportsBeat segments, the five-minute daily mainstay of the network since Brent Musburger launched ESPN Radio with the inaugural SportsBeat on January 1, 1992. Tirico is one of the most respected play-by-play men in the country as he has experience as the lead play-by-play man of ESPN's Monday Night Football and also calls NBA games for the network as well as formally served as an anchor on ESPN's signature show SportsCenter. After Mike Tirico left ESPN in 2016, Dari Nowkhah, who filled in for Mike Tirico on SportsBeat in the past, became the permanent host of the ESPN Radio SportsBeat.

== Television series ==
SportsBeat (or ABC SportsBeat, its official title) was previously a television series that was hosted by Howard Cosell on ABC. SportsBeat, which ran from 1983–1985, won three Emmy Awards. ABC SportsBeat was a precursor of sorts to sports magazine shows like ESPN's Outside the Lines and HBO's Real Sports with Bryant Gumbel. SportsBeat likewise featured penetrating, in-depth interviews.
