= Emmanuel Yeboah (cyclist) =

Ghanaian athlete and activist

Emmanuel Ofosu Yeboahhh
Personal information
- Full name: Emmanuel Ofosu Yeboah
- Nickname: Yeboah
- Nationality: (Ghana) Ghanaian
- Born: 1977 (age 48–49) Ghana

Sport
- Country: South Africa
- Sport: Cycling
- Disability: Hemimelia

Emmanuel Ofosu Yeboah is a Ghanaian athlete and disability rights activist from Koforidua. Yeboah was born in 1977 with a severely deformed right leg. In 2001, he rode the 400 mi (644 km) across Ghana to bring attention to the plight of disabled people in that country. In the process, he applied for a grant of a bicycle from the Challenged Athletes Foundation (CAF).

After completing the cross-country trek in Ghana, the CAF invited him to participate in the 2002 Triathlon Challenge in San Diego, CA. During the course of Yeboah's visit, doctors from Loma Linda University Medical Center informed him that he was an excellent candidate for a prosthetic leg. Following a successful surgery and six-week recovery, Yeboah entered the CAF triathlon, reducing his time by 3 hours. Yeboah was subsequently awarded the CAF Most Inspirational Athlete of the Year Award and Nike's Casey Martin award.

Yeboah received approximately $50,000 from those awards. Upon returning to Ghana, he used the money to open the Emmanuel Education Fund for promising students with disabilities. In 2005, Yeboah's story was captured in Emmanuel's Gift, narrated by Oprah Winfrey.

Yeboah is the subject of the book Emmanuel's Dream: The True Story of Emmanuel Ofosu Yeboah by Laurie Ann Thompson. The audiobook edition was nominated for the 2022 Odyssey Award.
