= Emmanuel's Dream =

2015 picture book by Laurie Ann Thompson

- Author: Laurie Ann Thompson
- Illustrator: Sean Qualls
- Publisher: Schwartz & Wade
- Publication date: 2015
- ISBN: 9780449817445

Emmanuel's Dream: The True Story of Emmanuel Ofosu Yeboah is a 2015 picture book written by American writer Laurie Ann Thompson, with illustrations by Sean Qualls. It tells the story of Ghanaian cyclist Emmanuel Ofosu Yeboah who was born with a leg deformity and went on to become a disability rights activist.

== Reception ==
Emmanuel's Dream was reviewed by Publishers Weekly and the School Library Journal.

The book won the 2016 Schneider Family Book Award. Additionally, the audiobook adaption narrated by Adjoa Andoh was honored in the 2022 Odyssey Awards.
