= Awista Ayub =

Afghan writer

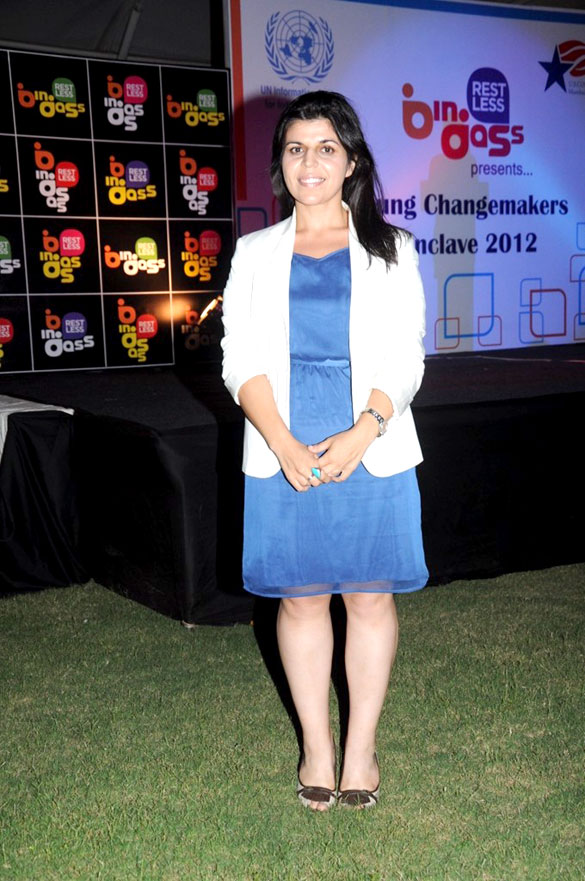
Awista Ayub

Awista Ayub (c. 1979) is an Afghan writer and founder of the Afghan Youth Sports Exchange in the United States.

== Life ==
In her novel Kabul Girls Soccer Club, originally titled However Tall the Mountain, Ayub tells the story of eight girls brought to the US to learn soccer.

The Afghan Youth Sports Exchange has grown from the original eight young women to hundreds competing through the Afghanistan Football Federation.

She is currently the Regional Director of the International organization for youth empowerment, "Seeds of Peace". She resides in Mumbai. Her work at Seeds of Peace is to select a delegation of young adults to be leaders from India, Pakistan and Afghanistan. These teenagers go to Maine, USA for a summer camp.
