= The Report Card =

Book by Andrew Clements

- First edition
- Author: Andrew Clements
- Cover artist: Brian Selznick
- Language: English
- Genre: Children's novel
- Publisher: Aladdin Paperbacks
- Publication date: 2004
- Publication place: United States
- Media type: Print
- Pages: 173

The Report Card is a children's novel by Andrew Clements, first published in 2004. The story is narrated by a 5th-grade girl, Nora Rose Rowley. Nora is secretly a genius but does not tell anyone for fear that she will be thought of as "different".

== Characters ==
- Nora Rose Rowley: The main character of the story and secretive genius. Her appearance is described as being short with reddish-blond hair. Researching is her favorite hobby. She was so intelligent by kindergarten that she taught herself to understand Spanish by watching the Univision channel and also to read National Geographic at 2 and a half. Nora loves astronomy, Latin, archaeology, soccer, etc. Her mother describes Nora as thoughtful, kind and caring. She has two siblings: Anne (6 years older) and Todd (3 years older). Her best friend is Stephen, who has average intelligence but still gets better grades than Nora in the beginning.
- Stephen Curtis: Nora's best friend. He is a young and relatively hardworking boy. For one of the utmost initial plot-points, it is remarked (as well as noticed by Nora) that his self-confidence budded poorly due to a low CMT (Connecticut Mastery Test) score. His favorite subject is English. He's also never said anything that came across as mean or angry. He got a higher grade than Nora in everything because Nora purposely had failed in everything. He was said to be a good friend, but forgets about her when some of his other friends come by.
- Ms. Hackney: The principal at Nora's school. She is one of the people in the meeting to explain her low grades, and was deeply upset by her getting three 0s in a row later in the story.
- Mrs. Byrne: The librarian at Philbrook Elementary School. She was one of the first to find out about Nora's unusually high intelligence and played a large role in carrying out her plan. She was equally unhappy about the competition for grades.
- Dr. Trindler: The guidance counselor who gave her an IQ test. He was the second one to discover her increased academic abilities.
- Ms. Noyes: Nora's Social Studies and English teacher
- Mrs. Zhang: Nora's science and math teacher.
- Mr. Rowley: Nora's dad, who expects great grades no lower than a B
- Mrs. Rowley: Nora's mom who also expects great grades for all her children
- Mr.Todd Rowley: Nora's older brother. He is said to get low grades and show little concern. He is 3 years older than Nora.
- Miss. Anne Rowley: Nora's older sister. She was said to get perfect grades, and is in band. She is 6 years older than Nora. She is said to be intense and always wants to be in the spotlight.
