= Things Not Seen =

Book by Andrew Clements

- First edition
- Author: Andrew Clements
- Language: English
- Genre: Science fiction, Realistic fiction
- Publisher: Philomel Books, Puffin
- Publication date: 2002
- Publication place: United States
- Media type: Print (hardcover, paperback)
- ISBN: 0-399-23626-0
- OCLC: 45790952
- LC Class: PZ7.C59118 Tgm 2002
- Followed by: Things Hoped For

Things Not Seen is a first-person novel written by Andrew Clements and his third novel after Frindle and The Landry News. The title is apparently taken from Hebrews 11:1, "Now faith is the substance of things hoped for, the evidence of things not seen" in the King James Version of the Bible. The book was originally released in 2002 by Philomel Books, an imprint of Penguin Group, but was re-released in 2006 as a platinum edition by Puffin. The platinum edition includes a short interview with Andrew Clements and a redesigned cover.

This book was followed by two sequels, Things Hoped For and Things That Are.

== Plot ==
Robert Phillips, a teenager known as "Bobby," wakes up one day to find that he has become invisible. He reveals his invisibility to his parents, who instruct him to stay at home until they return from work. Bobby's mother is an English professor, and his father is a scientist. However, Bobby leaves the house and goes to the library, where he encounters a blind girl named Alicia.

When Bobby returns home, he gets into trouble for leaving the house. Later, he learns that his parents were involved in a car crash. The police come to check on him, but he conceals his invisibility. Bobby goes to the hospital to see his parents, where his mother gives him money and tells him to keep his invisibility a secret.

The next day, Bobby returns to the library and meets Alicia again. He tells her that he is invisible and their families meet and attempt to solve the problem of Bobby's invisibility while his mother stalls Child Protective Services and the police by lying that he is on an extended trip. They determine a defective electric blanket from Sears-Roebuck and an abnormal solar wind event as plausible causes. Encouraged by meeting another person turned invisible in the same way named Sheila Borden, Bobby sleeps under the blanket and becomes visible again.

Bobby goes to tell Alicia the news, but she is worried that he will leave her alone now that he can go back to normal life. She expresses her feelings to him in an email and a poem. Bobby prints out the poem and goes to Alicia's house to confess that he loves her.

== Main characters ==
- Robert "Bobby" Phillips - A boy that wakes up invisible and meets a kind girl named Alicia.
- Alicia Van Dorn - A blind girl, also a high school student, who befriends Bobby.
- Emily Phillips - Bobby's mother, a professor of English literature.
- Mrs. Van Dorn - Alicia's mother.
- Dr. David Phillips - Bobby's father, a professor of physics.
- Mr. Van Dorn - Alicia's father, an astronomer.
- Mrs. Pagett - A social worker sent to look for Bobby after he had not been at school for many days.
- Sheila Borden - Another victim of being invisible.

== Awards ==
The book won the 2005 Middle School/Junior High California Young Reader Medal. The book won the American Library Association's 2004 Schneider Family Book Award.

== See also ==
- The Invisible Man, an 1897 novella by H. G. Wells
- Memoirs of an Invisible Man, a 1988 science fiction novel by H. F. Saint
- Fade, a 1988 YA novel by Robert Cormier
- Things Hoped For, sequel by Andrew Clements
