= Wonderstruck =

Wonderstruck may refer to:

- Wonderstruck (novel), a 2011 juvenile fiction book by Brian Selznick
- Wonderstruck (film), a 2017 film based on the above book
- Wonderstruck (TV series), a Canadian educational television series that aired on CBC Television between 1986 and 1992
