= Last Holiday =

Last Holiday may refer to:

- Last Holiday (1950 film), a 1950 British film starring Sir Alec Guinness
- Last Holiday (2006 film), a 2006 American remake starring Queen Latifah

== See also ==
- The Last Holiday Concert, a 2004 children's novel written by Andrew Clements
