= No Talking (disambiguation) =

No Talking is a 2007 children's novel by Andrew Clements.

No Talking may also refer to:

- "No Talking" (Breeders), a 2020 television episode
- "No Talking" (Roseanne), a 1989 television episode
- "No Talking", a 2019 song by Lil Gotit
- "No Talking", a 2009 song by the Zolas
