= Big Tree (Selznick novel) =

2023 children's novel by Brian Selznick

- Author: Brian Selznick
- Cover artist: Brian Selznick
- Language: English
- Genre: Fantasy fiction, children's literature
- Published: April 4, 2023
- Publisher: Scholastic Press
- Publication place: United States
- Media type: Hardcover
- Pages: 528
- ISBN: 978-1-338-18063-3
- OCLC: 1319010409

Big Tree is a children's fantasy fiction book written and illustrated by Brian Selznick and published by Scholastic. The hardcover edition was released on April 4, 2023, along with an audiobook edition narrated by actress Meryl Streep and a score provided by Ernest Troost. With nearly 300 pictures between the book's 228 pages, the book depends as much on its pictures as it does on the words. Selznick himself described the book as a "love letter to the natural world" and a fast-paced adventure throughout the history of Earth, inspired by books such as Alice in Wonderland and Charlotte's Web, along with books around nature including The Carrot Seed by Ruth Krauss and Crockett Johnson.

The book received positive reviews, with praise for its illustrations and plot. It was nominated a Grammy Award in 2024 for Best Audio Book, Narration & Storytelling Recording.

== Premise ==
Set in the perspective of Mother Nature, the book follows two small sycamore seeds, Mervin and Louise, who they embark on a journey from their Mama Tree to follow a mysterious voice from the prehistoric era to the modern times in order to save the world while finding a safe place for themselves.

== Characters ==
- Merwin - A seed who starts off life very uptight and scientific. He is named after the late poet William Stanley Merwin, U.S. Poet Laureate in 2010 who twice won the Pulitzer Prize for Poetry before dying in March 15, 2019.
- Louise - A seed who is very dreamy and poetic. She is named after Dr. Louise Colville, a seed specialist at Kew Gardens in the United Kingdom.

== Conception ==
The book was inspired by an idea from filmmaker Steven Spielberg, along with producer and CEO of Illumination, Chris Meledandri, which they invited Selznick in 2017 to make a movie by pitching him a story about nature through its POV. While settling on the time when the story will be at, Selznick thinks is sounds intriguing and later propose to move the story 232 million years to the very end of the Dinosaur era, jokingly called this Jurassic Park with Plants.

Knowing this is about Nature, Selznick reached out to paleobotaint Jamie Boyer and started to learn about plants around the time of Dinosaurs, thinking the story would connect to today's world and putting this in the POV of two tiny sycamore seeds as his focus, relating them to his previous works around young protagonists from The Invention of Hugo Cabret (2007) to Wonderstruck (2011). Over 2 years in 2019, when the COVID pandemic hit, this screenplay for the film never got made, but Selznick later proposed to turn his screenplay into a book with Spielberg and Meledandri's blessing.

== Reception ==
The book received generally positive reviews. Writing for The New York Times, Jennifer Krauss praised the book through the drama and delight of Selznick's elegant language and the eons-long story of lift itself as part of the context from his illustrations. In a starred review, Publishers Weekly called the book "as contemplating the power of life to heal and the importance of developing roots and wings, but its evocative prose and peppery dialogue sometimes get caught up with their message". Kirkus Reviews dubbed it "at once grand and intimate". School Library Journal also gave the book a starred review. Common Sense Media gave the book an outstanding 5 out of 5 stars, praising it to be a thrilling, science-packed story in an emotional roller-coaster.

The book was nominated for the 2024 Grammy Award for Best Audio Book, Narration & Storytelling Recording through its audiobook edition, which was narrated by Meryl Streep.

== Film adaptation ==
Following the announcement of the book in June 9, 2022, Universal Pictures and Illumination will own the film rights to adapt an animated film based on the book in co-production with Amblin Entertainment. As of 2026, no news has surfaced around the production of the film.
