= Extra credit (disambiguation) =

Extra credit may refer to:

- Extra credit, the academic concept
- Extra Credit, a 2009 children's novel
- Extra Credit (EP), a musical recording by Jason Mraz
