= Wonderstruck (film) =

- Film poster
- Directed by: Todd Haynes
- Screenplay by: Brian Selznick
- Based on: Wonderstruck by Brian Selznick
- Produced by: Pamela Koffler; John Sloss; Christine Vachon
- Starring: Oakes Fegley; Julianne Moore; Michelle Williams; Millicent Simmonds
- Cinematography: Edward Lachman
- Edited by: Affonso Gonçalves
- Music by: Carter Burwell
- Production companies: Killer Content; FilmNation Entertainment; Cinetic Media; Picrow
- Distributed by: Amazon Studios; Roadside Attractions
- Release dates: May 18, 2017 (Cannes); October 20, 2017 (United States)
- Running time: 116 minutes
- Country: United States
- Language: English
- Budget: $7 million
- Box office: $3.3 million

Wonderstruck is a 2017 American mystery drama film directed by Todd Haynes, based on the 2011 novel Wonderstruck by Brian Selznick, who adapted the novel into the screenplay. The film stars Oakes Fegley, Julianne Moore, Michelle Williams, and Millicent Simmonds in her film debut.

Wonderstruck premiered at the 2017 Cannes Film Festival on May 18, 2017, and competed for the Palme d'Or. It was given a limited release in the United States by Amazon Studios and Roadside Attractions on October 20, 2017. The film received generally favorable reviews from critics.

== Premise ==
The film interlaces two stories set 50 years apart, switching frequently between them, with the older story filmed in black and white. Each tells the story of a child's quest. In 1927, young, deaf girl Rose runs away from her father's New Jersey home to find her mother/idol, the actress Lillian Mayhew. In 1977, recently orphaned Ben, made deaf by a freak accident, runs away from his Minnesota home in search of his father.

== Cast ==
- Oakes Fegley as Ben
- Julianne Moore as Lillian Mayhew / Older Rose Mayhew
- Michelle Williams as Elaine Wilson
- Millicent Simmonds as Rose Mayhew
- Jaden Michael as Jamie
- Raul Torres as Jamie's father
- Murphy Guyer as Security Chief
- Tom Noonan as Older Walter Mayhew
- Cory Michael Smith as Walter Mayhew
- James Urbaniak as Dr. Kincaid, Rose's father
- Amy Hargreaves as Aunt Jenny
- Damian Young as Otto
- Morgan Turner as Janet
- Lauren Ridloff as Pearl, The Maid

== Production ==
Todd Haynes directed Wonderstruck based on an adapted screenplay by Brian Selznick, who also wrote the novel of the same name. Haynes was involved as director by May 2015 with Christine Vachon producing under her Killer Films banner. Haynes said his previous films had mostly been period films and that Wonderstruck's double-period premise, set in the 1920s and the 1970s, intrigued him. The director also considered the story "a classic mystery" in learning why two stories are being told and how they would connect. He saw it as a family film and as an opportunity to make a film about children that children could also see.

In November 2015, Julianne Moore had been cast in the film, with Pamela Koffler and John Sloss joining as producers. In April 2016, Jaden Michael, Cory Michael Smith, Michelle Williams, Oakes Fegley, and Amy Hargreaves joined the cast of the film. In May 2016, James Urbaniak joined the cast. Among those cast was Millicent Simmonds, a deaf actor from Utah. Haynes said they wanted to cast a deaf actor since deafness was integral to the two stories and the driving theme in the film. He instructed his casting director Laura Rosenthal to seek out deaf children around the country and if they could not find someone, they would cast a hearing child. They sought out deaf communities and received audition tapes from 200 deaf children. Simmonds was cast, and on set, she worked with American Sign Language interpreter Lynette Taylor.

Principal photography began on May 4, 2016. Filming took place in Peekskill, New York. Production concluded on July 3, 2016. The 1927 scenes were filmed in black and white in 35-negative anamorphic, which differs from the aspect ratio of silent films. Haynes, who was a fan of silent film directors F.W. Murnau and King Vidor, watched numerous silent films and observed that there was a wide range of styles that disappeared when sound technology made cameras too bulky to move easily. In Wonderstruck, the black-and-white scenes have a near-continuous musical soundtrack and use some design features that Haynes said were "not naturalistic or literal". The 1977 scenes were filmed with color-negative film in a way that matched the visual language of films from the 1970s, and also had "a gritty urban color" like the films Midnight Cowboy (1969) and The French Connection (1971). Both parts were filmed by cinematographer Edward Lachman.

== Release ==
Amazon Studios and Roadside Attractions distributed the film. Amazon Studios partnered with Roadside to distribute Wonderstruck in the United States. It had its world premiere on May 18, 2017, at the 2017 Cannes Film Festival, where it competed for the Palme d'Or in the main competition section.

It also screened at the New York Film Festival on October 7, 2017. The film began a limited release in the United States on October 20, 2017, before a wider release in mid-November 2017.

== Reception ==
=== Box office ===
Wonderstruck has grossed $1 million in the United States and Canada, and $2.2 million in other territories, for a worldwide total of $3.3 million.

=== Critical response ===
Wonderstruck was met with a three-minute standing ovation following its premiere at the 2017 Cannes Film Festival. On review aggregator Rotten Tomatoes, the film holds an approval rating of 68% based on 228 reviews, with an average rating of 6.70/10. The website's critical consensus reads, "Wonderstruck's efforts to juggle timelines and tonal shifts aren't always smooth, but the end result still adds up to an emotional journey whose visual thrills live up to its title." On Metacritic, the film has a weighted average score of 71 out of 100, based on 44 critics, indicating "generally favorable reviews".

David Rooney of The Hollywood Reporter gave the film a positive review writing: "Alive with the magic of pictures and the mysteries of silence, this is an uncommonly grownup film about children, communication, connection and memory." David Ehrlich of IndieWire also gave the film a positive review writing: "A soul-stirring and fiercely uncynical film."

=== Accolades ===
Award	Date of ceremony	Category	Recipient(s) and nominee(s)	Result	Ref.
Saturn Awards	June 27, 2018	Best Performance by a Younger Actor	Millicent Simmonds	Nominated	
Saturn Awards	June 27, 2018	Best Music	Carter Burwell	Nominated	
Saturn Awards	June 27, 2018	Best Independent Film	Wonderstruck	Nominated	

== See also ==
- List of films featuring the deaf and hard of hearing
