= Aladdin Paperbacks =

American publishing company

- Aladdin Paperbacks logo
- Parent company: Simon & Schuster
- Founded: March 5, 1967; 59 years ago
- Founder: Jean E. Karl
- Country of origin: United States
- Headquarters location: New York City
- Publication types: Books
- Fiction genres: Children's literature
- Owner: KKR
- Official website: simonandschusterpublishing.com/aladdin/

Aladdin Paperbacks is one of several children's-book imprints owned by Simon & Schuster. It was established by Jean E. Karl at Atheneum Books where she was the founding director of the children's department (1961). Atheneum merged with or was acquired by Scribner's in 1978, then Macmillan in 1984, before the acquisition by Simon & Schuster in 1994.

There may have been previous uses of 'Aladdin' as a brand name in the book industry.

== Remit ==
Aladdin Paperbacks are aimed at readers aged 4 to 12 and most are reprints from other (hardcover) imprints, which include what Simon & Schuster term some of the most enduring children's books of the modern era. Its ranges include the "Ready-to-Read books", and the slightly older "Ready-for-Chapters" titles aimed at younger age-groups and beginners. Aladdin also publishes a "limited number" of original titles and series entries, across multiple genres including action, adventure, and relationships novels.

=== Executives ===
The first children's book published by the dependent imprint seems to have been in 1967. Karl ran the Atheneum Books for Younger Readers, Aladdin, and Argo imprints until she retired in 1985.

In October 2002, Eloise Flood was appointed to the newly created position of "Vice President and Publisher" of Simon & Schuster's Children's Publishing Paperback Group, the role encompassing both the Aladdin Paperbacks and Simon Pulse imprints. As of April 2008, the current executives overseeing the entire Children's division include Rick Richter (President), Robin Corey, who holds the title of "Executive Vice President & Publisher, Novelty & Media Tie-Ins, Simon & Schuster Children's Publishing", and Liesa Abrams, a Senior Editor.

== Books ==
Some works were published in Aladdin editions, where dates are those of first publication, commonly in a hardcover edition under another imprint.

- Strega Nona (1975) by Tomie dePaola
- Bunnicula series by James Howe, from 1979
- Henry and Mudge series by Cynthia Rylant and Suçie Stevenson, from 1987
- Shiloh trilogy by Phyllis Reynolds Naylor, from 1991
- Pendragon series by D. J. MacHale, from 2002
- Canterwood Crest series by Jessica Burkhart, from 2006
- The Melting of Maggie Bean (2007) by Tricia Rayburn
- Dork Diaries series by Rachel Renée Russell, from 2009
- The Goddess Girls series by Joan Holub and Suzanne Williams, from 2010
- Half Upon a Time series by James Riley, from 2010
- Story Thieves series by James Riley, from 2015

== Nancy Drew & Hardy Boys series ==
- Nancy Drew: Girl Detective series by Carolyn Keene
- The Hardy Boys: Undercover Brothers series by Franklin W. Dixon
- Nancy Drew Diaries series by Carolyn Keene
- The Hardy Boys Adventure series by Franklin W. Dixon

Aladdin's (and parent Simon & Schuster's) best-known titles are the later (non-Grosset & Dunlap published) titles in several of The Hardy Boys (written under the pen name Franklin W. Dixon) and Nancy Drew (written under the name Carolyn Keene) series, including the original series and the more recent lines.
