= Shampoodle =

Shampoodle may refer to:

- Shampoodle, an award-nominated 2009 children's book by Joan Holub
- 'The Shampoodles', the former name of the Australian band Happyland (band)
- "Shampoodle", a fictional location in the videogame franchise Animal Crossing; see List of Animal Crossing series characters

== See also ==
- Shampoo
- Poodle
- Sham (disambiguation)
- Poo
