= The Dinosaurs of Waterhouse Hawkins =

2001 children's picture book by Barbara Kerley

- Author: Barbara Kerley
- Illustrator: Brian Selznick
- Language: English
- Genre: Biography
- Published: 2001
- Publisher: Scholastic Press
- Publication place: United States
- Award: Caldecott Honor
- ISBN: 9780439114943

The Dinosaurs of Waterhouse Hawkins is a 2001 picture book by Barbara Kerley and illustrated by Brian Selznick. The book tells the story of Benjamin Waterhouse Hawkins and how he built the Crystal Palace dinosaurs. The book was a recipient of the 2002 Caldecott Honor for its illustrations.

In 2010, Weston Woods adapted this book into a film narrated by Jonathan Pryce. It won an ALA Notable Video award in 2011 from the Association of Library Services for Children (ALSC).
