= The Landry News =

1999 book by Andrew Clements

- Author: Andrew Clements
- Illustrator: Sal Murdocca (hc); Brian Selznick (pb)
- Cover artist: Sal Murdocca (hc); Brian Selznick (pb)
- Language: English
- Genre: Children's
- Publisher: Aladdin Paperbacks
- Publication date: May 1, 1999
- Publication place: United States
- Media type: Print
- Pages: 130

The Landry News is a children's book by Andrew Clements first published in the United States in 1999 by Aladdin.

== Plot summary ==
Cara Landry, a student in Mr. Larson's 5th grade classroom, publishes her own newspaper titled "The Landry News". She includes an editorial about her teacher, Mr. Larson, who had once been the teacher of the year, but had over time become completely apathetic and demoralized. Mr. Larson soon returns to his old teaching ways, when Cara's merciless editorial opens his eyes to the truth. Cara continues the class newspaper as a "class project" and extends the newspaper with every edition, as the rest of the class begins to contribute to it.

One day, a boy in the class comes up to her and asks if she could read a story his "friend" wrote, titled "Lost and Found". Cara realizes it was the boy who wrote the story, which is about a divorce between his parents and how he learned to deal with it. She loves the article because it describes how she felt when her parents were divorced. The story is printed in "The Landry News", only to have the principal, Dr. Barnes become furious at Mr. Larson for allowing it. Dr. Barnes is actually seeking a pretext to get rid of Mr. Larson, because he disapproves of the way Mr. Larson teaches. Dr. Barnes begins telling the media that the "article is too personally revealing for children, or anyone else," and forbids publication of the "Landry News".

The newspaper receives publicity because of the paper being banned, Cara is interviewed for TV, and a hearing is planned for Mr. Larson. On the day of the hearing, the boy who wrote the story reads it out loud. Cara says that if he is brave enough to say what he feels, the rest of them should be able to read his words. Mr. Larson is vindicated, and Cara hands out a special edition of the "Landry News". The last article of the newspaper is an editorial written by Cara, saying that Mr. Larson will soon be "Teacher of the Year" again. He then realizes that he had made the mistake of not taking care of the students' needs before this.

== Reception ==
Tina Hudak, writing for School Library Journal, highlighted how Clements "uses an everyday classroom setting to illuminate words and their importance", including personal issues, such as divorce, as well as academic issues, such as "newspaper analysis, the Constitution, and the First Amendment", which "are introduced and briefly summarized". Clements further pointed out how Clements "clear and simple sentence structure" presents such topics "with sensitivity and a lot of humor".

Hudak also discussed how the audiobook's narrator, Andrew McCarthy, "uses inflection and tone with subtle voice changes to make the fifth grade girls and boys and the stodgy principal vital and believable characters".
