= Lost and Found (novel) =

2008 children's novel by Andrew Clements

- First edition
- Author: Andrew Clements
- Illustrator: Mark Elliott
- Language: English
- Genre: Children's literature
- Published: July 1, 2008 Atheneum Books
- Media type: Print (Hardback & Paperback)
- Pages: 176 pp
- ISBN: 1-4169-0985-0

Lost and Found is a 2008 children’s novel written by American author Andrew Clements and illustrated by Mark Elliott. The book centers on identical twin brothers, Jay and Ray Grayson, who have recently moved to a new town. When a clerical error at their new elementary school results in only one of their names being entered into the school’s system, the twins decide to take advantage of the mistake by alternating attendance and pretending to be a single student. The deception initially gives each boy the rare opportunity to experience life as an individual, free from the constant comparison that comes with being a twin. However, as the ruse continues, their situation becomes increasingly complicated due to them realising that they are different people and cannot pretend otherwise. Their experiment leads to confusion, guilt, and a growing sense of unease that ultimately forces them to confront issues of honesty, identity, and self-understanding. Lost and Found received generally positive reviews for its accessible prose and realistic portrayal of sibling dynamics, as well as its exploration of individuality and moral development—recurring themes in Clements’s body of work.
