= The Goddess Girls =

Children's book series

- Athena the Brain (2010); Persephone the Phony (2010); Aphrodite the Beauty (2010); Artemis the Brave (2010); Athena the Wise (2011); Aphrodite the Diva (2011); Artemis the Loyal (2011); Medusa the Mean (2012); The Girl Games (2012); Pandora the Curious (2012); Pheme the Gossip (2013); Persephone the Daring (2013); Cassandra the Lucky (2013); Athena the Proud (2014); Iris the Colorful (2014); Aphrodite the Fair (2014); Medusa the Rich (2015); Amphitrite the Bubbly (2015); Hestia the Invisible (2015); Echo the Copycat (2016); Calliope the Muse (2016); Pallas the Pal (2016); Nyx the Mysterious (2017); Medea the Enchantress (2017); Eos the Lighthearted (2018); Clotho the Fate (2019); Persephone the Grateful (2020); Hecate the Witch (2021); Artemis the Hero (2022); Elpis the Hopeful (2023); Time Travelers (2024)
- Author: Joan Holub; Suzanne Williams
- Cover artist: Glen Hanson
- Country: United States
- Language: English
- Genre: Fantasy, mythology
- Publisher: Simon & Schuster
- Published: 2010-2024
- Media type: Print (paperback), ebook

The Goddess Girls is a series of children's books written by Joan Holub and Suzanne Williams, published by Simon & Schuster under the Aladdin imprint. The books are based on Greek mythology and depict the younger generation of the Olympian pantheon as privileged tween students attending Mount Olympus Academy (MOA) to develop their divine skills.

The series focuses on four primary characters – Athena, Persephone, Aphrodite, and Artemis — as a diverse group of loyal friends. Athena is noted for her intelligence, Persephone is mysterious and kind, Artemis is bold and strong, and Aphrodite is "effortlessly beautiful". Holub writes about Athena and Artemis, and Williams about Persephone and Aphrodite.

Zeus is represented as the principal of the academy, and many other gods, including Hades, Poseidon, and Ares, appear in the series. Pandora, Medusa and Heracles appear as mortal characters.

The series includes deities and characters from other mythological traditions as visitors to the academy.

== Titles ==
Number	Title	ISBN	Date of publication
1	Athena the Brain	978-1-4169-8271-5	April 6, 2010
2	Persephone the Phony	978-1-4169-8272-2	April 12, 2010
3	Aphrodite the Beauty	978-1-4169-8273-9	April 12, 2010
4	Artemis the Brave	978-1-4169-8274-6	December 7, 2010
5	Athena the Wise	978-1-4424-2097-7	April 5, 2011
6	Aphrodite the Diva	978-1-4424-2100-4	August 12, 2011
7	Artemis the Loyal	978-1-4424-3377-9	December 6, 2011
8	Medusa the Mean	978-1-4424-3379-3	April 3, 2012
Special	The Girl Games	978-1-4424-4933-6	July 10, 2012
9	Pandora the Curious	978-1-4424-4935-0	December 4, 2012
10	Pheme the Gossip	978-1-4424-4937-4	April 12, 2013
11	Persephone the Daring	978-1-4424-4939-8	August 6, 2013
12	Cassandra the Lucky	978-1-4424-8817-5	December 3, 2013
13	Athena the Proud	978-1-4424-8820-5	April 5, 2014
14	Iris the Colorful	978-1-4424-8823-6	August 5, 2014
15	Aphrodite the Fair	978-0-6063-6101-9	December 2, 2014
16	Medusa the Rich	978-1-4424-8830-4	April 28, 2015
17	Amphitrite the Bubbly	978-1-4424-8832-8	August 18, 2015
18	Hestia the Invisible	978-1-4814-4998-4	December 1, 2015
19	Echo the Copycat	978-1-4814-5001-0	April 26, 2016
20	Calliope the Muse	978-1-4814-5004-1	August 9, 2016
21	Pallas the Pal	978-1-4814-5007-2	December 6, 2016
22	Nyx the Mysterious	978-1-4814-7014-8	April 4, 2017
23	Medea the Enchantress	978-1-4814-7017-9	December 5, 2017
24	Eos the Lighthearted	978-1-4814-7021-6	December 4, 2018
25	Clotho the Fate	978-1-4814-7023-0	December 3, 2019
26	Persephone the Grateful	978-1-5344-5739-3	December 1, 2020
27	Hecate the Witch	978-1-5344-5742-3	November 30, 2021
28	Artemis the Hero	978-1-5344-5745-4	December 6, 2022
29	Elpis the Hopeful	978-1-5344-5748-5	December 5, 2023
Special	Time Travelers	978-1-6659-1782-7	September 10, 2024

== Characters ==
=== The Goddess Girls ===
- Athena is at the beginning of the series a brainy and seemingly mortal girl who has never quite fitted in at her junior high school. Raised on Earth, Athena has a happy, wonderful life with her parents and stepsister Pallas, who is also her best friend. She eventually discovers her father is Zeus, King of the Gods and Ruler of the Heavens. She then transfers to Mount Olympus Academy, where she becomes one of its top students. In Aphrodite the Diva Aphrodite finds Zeus a new wife, Hera, who becomes Athena's new stepmother. Athena has wavy brown hair and gray eyes, and she usually wears a blue chiton. She often doesn't worry about her looks and can be completely clueless about romance, but she is particularly beautiful. Athena soon makes friends with the most popular girls at school – Persephone, Aphrodite, and Artemis. She is the youngest of the Goddess Girls but is the smartest girl in the academy and always makes "A"s. She can shapeshift and loves owls, her favorite animal. Athena becomes the goddess girl of wisdom due to her intelligence and good judgment. In Athena the Wise she develops a crush on Heracles, a strong mortal who transfers to the Academy.
- Persephone, the daughter of Demeter, the goddess of fertility, flowers, and spring, loves flowers and can make them grow with a single touch of her finger. Persephone is a very beautiful, kind-hearted goddess girl, as well as extremely considerate and understanding. She has pale skin and frizzy red hair, and often wears a yellow chiton. Her mother encourages her to "go along to get along", but when she meets and falls in love with a boy named Hades, she begins to live by her own opinions, instead of just following others. Persephone helps sort things out and is very calm. She eventually becomes a dog-lover because of Cerberus, a three-headed dog in the Underworld owned by her boyfriend Hades. In Persephone the Daring, she has her first kiss with Hades. In The Girl Games she realizes she also loves cats, when Aphrodite finds a stray cat in the girls' local mall, the "Immortal Marketplace".
- Aphrodite, the goddess of love and beauty and one of the most popular girls at school, is obsessed with her looks. She has long, curly blond hair, blue eyes, a slender, graceful figure and usually wears make-up. She wears many different colors of chitons, but often wears pink ones. She loves matchmaking mortals and helping mortals in love. In Aphrodite the Diva she makes a Lonely Hearts Club, a club to help mortals in love, to raise her grades. Not surprisingly, her beauty attracts a lot of attention, especially from god boys. She has an on-and-off relationship with Ares, occasionally arguing with him, though they always make up. Aphrodite has no parents, having sprouted from seafoam.
- Artemis loves animals and sports. She is the best archer at Mount Olympus Academy, along with her twin brother, Apollo. She is best friends with Aphrodite, Persephone, and Athena. Artemis cares nothing for fashion and is the goddess girl of the moon and the hunt. She wears a short red chiton, is dark skinned, and always carries her bow and her silver arrows. She has three dogs, Amby, Nectar, and Suez, and four white deer who pull her chariot. In Artemis the Brave, Artemis has her first crush, on Orion, but later realizes that he only cares about himself. In The Girl Games, Actaeon kisses her on the cheek. Artemis also has a psychic connection with Apollo as shown in Artemis the Loyal.

=== Recurring characters ===
==== Godboys ====
- Apollo is the god boy of truth and prophecies. He is Artemis's twin brother and, like her, is athletic and skilled at archery. He is part of a band called Heavens Above. He appears in Artemis the Brave and Artemis the Loyal, where he argues with Artemis. In Cassandra the Lucky, Apollo develops a crush on Cassandra after cursing her.
- Ares is the god boy of war and is the academy's fastest runner. He is tall, particularly muscular, and the cutest god boy in MOA according to Aphrodite. In Aphrodite the Beauty, Aphrodite becomes jealous because he pays attention to Athena. In Aphrodite the Diva he writes a song for Aphrodite. He is in the band Heavens Above with Dionysus, Poseidon, and Apollo. He and Aphrodite sometimes argue, but they are deeply in love and hope one day to get married. In The Girl Games he helps her to run faster.
- Dionysus is the god boy of wine. Dionysus appears in the eighth book Medusa the Mean. Medusa is Dionysus's crush, despite their differences.
- Poseidon is the god boy of the sea. He always carries a trident around and is always dripping wet, like he just got done swimming. He is one of the popular god boys. Medusa likes Poseidon in the beginning but finds out he is mean and selfish. Pandora likes him too, but in Pandora the Curious, she likes Epimetheus, the Titan boy. In Amphitrite the Bubbly it is revealed that Poseidon just wants to make great achievements like his friends. Poseidon has a crush on Amphitrite.
- Hades is the god boy of death and first appears in Persephone the Phony. He is dark, gloomy, handsome, and he did not like to talk a lot until he met Persephone. She is the first one to judge him by his character and not the fact that he is from the Underworld. As a result, they eventually fall in love with each other. In The Girl Games, he coaches Persephone for the long jump. Hades has a three-headed dog named Cerberus in the Underworld. Also in Persephone the Daring he stands in for Poseidon on the drums in Heavens Above, and he also has his very first kiss with Persephone, officially making them boyfriend and girlfriend.
- Hephaestus is the god boy of metalworking. He first appears in Aphrodite the Beauty. He is scrawny, clumsy, and lame in both legs. Aphrodite doesn't like his looks but she thinks that he has "inner beauty". He has a crush on Aphrodite at first and gives her beautiful roses, but later in the series he wins the heart of another beautiful goddess girl named Aglaia, who is deeply in love with Hephaestus.

==== Mortals ====
- Orion is a mortal that appeared in book 4 "Artemis the brave", and he was self-centered and acted nice to make Artemis like him.
- Medusa is originally the "mean girl" at Mount Olympus Academy, but she proves that she is really just misunderstood. In the first seven books, she is the archenemy of the four most popular goddess girls at the academy. She is famous for her stoneifying gaze, which was accidentally caused by one of Athena's inventions. Snarkypoo, or as Athena misspelled it, Snakeypoo, dripped in Medusa's eyes when she was showering and ended up making her gaze able to turn mortals into stone. Snarkypoo was originally made to turn snarky words into stone. Medusa has two twin immortal sisters, Stheno and Euryale. They are goddess girls in her family, but Medusa is mortal. In Medusa the Mean, the real part of Medusa is exposed, as she actually wants an immortality and popularity. One of her big secrets is that she actually has to study extremely hard to keep up. In Medusa the Mean she gets to be immortal for one day because of her "present" to Principal Zeus's wedding. Not many mortals get to go to MOA but her sisters sneaked her in, and when Zeus found out he let her stay. In the early books, Medusa had a crush on Poseidon, but she later realizes that another god boy, Dionysus, really likes her and soon she developed romantic feelings for him. In Greek mythology, the three Gorgon sisters—Medusa, Stheno, and Euryale—were all children of the ancient marine deities Phorcys (or Phorkys) and his sister Ceto (or Keto), chthonic monsters from an archaic world. In the Goddess Girls series, Ceto and Phorcys are mentioned as a sea monster and sea hog.
- Pandora is a mortal girl who is very curious. She used to have a crush on Poseidon, but then crushes on Epimetheus in Pandora the Curious. Her friends are Athena, Medusa and Pheme. As a symbol of her great curiosity, her blue-and-gold streaked bangs are in the shape of a question mark, they are also the school colors which shows that she has school spirit. She is very nice, but it is very hard for the other goddess girls to actually have a conversation with her because of her lack of attention. When she talks to them she just keeps on asking questions without giving them a chance to answer.
- Heracles first appears in the fifth book of the series, Athena the Wise. He is described as a mortal boy with dark, curly hair, wears a lion-skin cape, and carries a big club with him. Aphrodite made cutting comments about the cape, but Heracles's friends think it is cool. In the book Athena the Wise, Heracles must complete 12 labors in one week or else he is expelled . The principal secretly asks his daughter Athena to watch over Heracles, and they develop a crush on each other.
- Actaeon is mentioned at the end of the book Artemis the Brave and in Artemis the Loyal, where he plays a minor role. He is friends with Apollo, who thinks that Actaeon likes Artemis. In The Girl Games he shows interest in Penthe, a mortal Amazon girl competing against Artemis in the games. Artemis becomes jealous but in the end, Penthe and Artemis become friends. He later kisses Artemis which proves that he has a crush on Artemis.
- Cassandra first appears as a bridesmaid at Hera's and Zeus's wedding. She used to be a princess in Troy. In Cassandra the Lucky, she is angry with Athena, Aphrodite and Apollo for starting the Trojan War. Like Apollo, she can tell fortunes—but no one believes her predictions. She later develops a crush on Apollo.
- Ariadne is the princess of Crete and daughter of King Minos. She first appears in Medusa the Mean as Dionysus' first bridesmaid.
- Pallas is Athena's foster sister. In Pallas the Pal, she met up with Athena and finds out that she had new friends in MOA. And became jealous. In the end, she became good friends with Athena and the rest of the MOA students.

==== Supporting characters ====
- Zeus is the principal of Mount Olympus Academy, aside from being king of the gods and ruler of the heavens. Athena is his daughter by his first wife Metis. In the eighth book, Medusa the Mean, Zeus marries Hera. He is seven feet tall, and has a red beard and red hair. His office is described as very messy, with blackened marks (from instances of temper) on the walls.
- Demeter is Persephone's mother and goddess of fertility. Demeter does not like her daughter's crush Hades at first, but changes her mind when Persephone says that Principal Zeus likes him. She owns a shop in the Immortal Marketplace called Demeter's Daffodils, Daisies, and Floral Delights.
- Hera is first introduced in Aphrodite the Diva. She is Zeus's new wife, Athena's stepmother, goddess of marriage, and owner of a shop called Hera's Happy Endings.
- Pheme talks fast, spreading the latest news and gossip, and while she talks, small clouds form and words fill the air. She has spiky short orange hair, brown eyes and orange glossy lips. Zeus later grants her orange wings, enabling her to fly. Although Pheme is not a "popular girl" like the Goddess Girls, she is on-and-off friends with them. Pheme's crush is Eros, the godboy of love.
- Iris is the goddess of the rainbow, being able to make rainbows across the sky and travel to places very quickly. Her wings and hair change colors based on her mood. Iris's wings are for decoration, not flight, so she travels on rainbows. Zephyrus is Iris's crush.
- Amphitrite is goddess of the seas. She is a beautiful mermaid with coral mermaid fins and blue hair decorated with seashells. She later transfers to MOA as an exchange student, upon learning to transform her tail into legs to walk on land. Poseidon is Amphitrite's crush.
- Hestia is the goddess of the hearth. She wears a long red cape and has freckles. She has the power to set things on fire with a simple wave of her hands. In Hestia the Invisible, she feels unseen to everyone at first, but she loves to cook. In the end, Hestia made a new recipe for the MOA's dessert, flambrosia, which is made with chocolate cake, meringue, nectar flavored frosting, ambrosia ice cream, and for a special effect, flames. Pheme placed it in the cooking column of Teen Scrollzine.
- Echo is a forest nymph who copies all of the students in Mount Olympus Academy, just to make friends and to fit in. She has dark skin, green hair and green eyes, a green chiton, and is decorated with pink flowers all over hair and her dress. In Echo the Copycat, she likes to copy everything she finds cool, but everyone finds this annoying. When the tree that she lives is struck by lightning due to her copying another nymph's tree-protecting chant rather than using her own, thus making her an outsider, she asks Zeus to heal it. Zeus instead gives her the option to become a different kind of nymph, but Echo doesn't fit in with any of the other nymphs. In the end, the Goddess Girls help her to be herself and become a fashion designer. She returns to her tree and finds a sapling growing from her tree's seeds, and she decides to live with the new tree. Narcissus was Echo's crush, but then she realized how selfish he was.
- Narcissus is a mortal boy who admires his reflection in mirrors and in the water, thanks to Nemesis. He loves himself more than any girl. In Echo the Copycat, he doesn't notice Echo, who has a crush on him until the end, when she realizes how self-absorbed he was. Narcissus has a crush on his own reflection.
- Clotho is one of the Fates. She is a spinner of the thread. Her older sisters are Lachesis, the Fate who tells how long a mortal will live their life, and Atropos, the cutter of the thread, to end the mortal's life. In Clotho the Fate, she and the Fates are trying to gain their respect through making a yarn store in the Immoral Marketplace, which is forbidden by Zeus. In the end, however, Zeus decides to let Clotho and her sisters have their store, by inventing the alphabet, so the mortals can read about their fate.
- Eos is the goddessgirl of the dawn. She is Nyx's friend. In Eos the Lighthearted, she doesn't want to go to MOA because she blames Zeus for the imprisonment of her father, Hyperion a long time ago. When she realizes her father isn't living such a bad life and is Zeus's friend, she lets go of her anger against Zeus.
- Medea is an enchantress. She creates potions and performs magic spells. In Medea The Enchantress, she helps making the sleeping potion to get the Golden Fleece from the python, so Jason can get the honor of King Aeson and rule Libya. Medea and Jason then fall in love with each other. Jason is Medea's friend-turned-crush.
- Calliope is one of the Sister Muses. She is the muse of epic poetry. In Calliope the Muse, Calliope and the rest of her sisters decide to make a museum for all of the godboys and the goddessgirls in Mount Olympics Academy. She is Amphitrite's roommate, and Homer's crush, but he thinks of her as a friend.
- Minthe is a water naiad of the Cocytus River, found in the Underworld by Persephone. In Persephone the Grateful, Persephone helps Minthe with the Cocytus River, but the rest of the MOA think she smells bad, like the river. Minthe is briefly jealous of Persephone but in the end she becomes Persephone's friend and stays with her in the Underworld. Persephone gave her a garden of mint.
- Hecate is a goddessgirl of Witchcraft. She is from Hexwitch School and tries not to get in trouble. In Hecate the Witch, she meets Melinoe, a ghost who brings the dead animals to the River Styx in the Underworld, but suddenly, the dead animals follow her wherever she goes, even to school, and she asks for help from Melinoe and the two became friends.

== Plot summaries ==
=== Athena the Brain ===
Athena has always been smart but never knew she was a goddess. Mount Olympus Academy promises to be a new start, but she has to deal with the meanest girl in history, called Medusa.

=== Persephone the Phony ===
Persephone often "goes along to get along" instead of doing what she really wants, but when she meets Mount Olympus Academy bad-boy Hades, she finally feels she has found someone with whom she can be herself.

=== Aphrodite the Beauty ===
Aphrodite loves helping mortals in love but finds the constant attention from the god boys at Mount Olympus Academy frustrating. When she gives Athena a makeover, however, she is surprised to find that she is jealous of all the interest Athena's new look gets. When the hottest god boys at school start ignoring Aphrodite, she learns that some boys are nicer and more sensitive than others, including a mortal youth who has requested her help in winning the heart of a young maiden.

=== Artemis the Brave ===
Artemis's friends and classmates see her as the most courageous goddess girl at school, but she is secretly afraid of the smelly Geryon, the ring-nosed Minotaurs, and the scorpions in Beastology class. She is also scared to speak to her crush Orion.

=== Athena the Wise ===
When a mortal named Heracles transfers to the academy, Athena understands his problems as she was new a few months ago herself. Not only does Heracles need help in fitting in, he also has to complete 12 "labors" or leave the academy. Athena and Heracles work together to complete the tasks.

=== Aphrodite the Diva ===
Aphrodite is failing Hero-ology. To raise up her grade, she concocts a plan—an extra credit project for matchmaking mortals called the Lonely Hearts Club. This takes her to Egypt and where she faces competition, a goddess named Isis. They complete to see who can find the perfect match for a mortal boy.

=== Artemis the Loyal ===
It is time for the annual Olympic Games at Mount Olympus Academy and the four goddess girls are not happy, especially Artemis, because the Games are for boys only. Artemis fails to persuade Zeus to allow girls to enter the Olympic Games, but concocts a brilliant plan: a girls-only Olympics. Zeus decides to name the games after his new wife, Hera.

=== Medusa the Mean ===
Medusa wants to be immortal like her two sisters and the other kids in her class. As one of the only mortals at Mount Olympus Academy, Medusa is sick and tired of being surrounded by beautiful, powerful, and immortal classmates. She also cannot make a friends, because she has a snakes on hair and a reputation for being mean.

She thinks that immortality will solve everything. When Medusa finds out about a necklace that promises just that, she thinks that it will make her popular as the four Goddess Girls, as well as to get a boyfriend named Poseidon.

=== The Girl Games ===
Artemis, Persephone, Aphrodite, and Athena are finally getting a chance to hold a girls-only Olympic Games, but organizing visiting athletes like those crush-stealing Amazons is not easy. Artemis is trying too hard to do everything herself, Athena is in trouble over a winged horse named Pegasus, and Aphrodite and Persephone are fighting over a lost kitten named Adonis.

=== Pandora the Curious ===
One of the few mortals at Mount Olympus Academy, Pandora is famous for her curiosity, which is aroused when a Titan god boy named Epimetheus brings a mysterious box to school. He is the nephew of an MOA teacher in whose class Pandora once opened another box that sent a few weather disasters down to Earth. Still, Pandora cannot resist taking a look inside this new box when it unexpectedly lands in her lap.

=== Pheme the Gossip ===
Pheme prides herself on knowing all the gossip at MOA, but when she is caught snooping, she is challenged to go a whole day without gossiping and is put under a unique spell to make sure she doesn't. When a mysterious stowaway hints that he is about to do something that could threaten the safety of the entire world, Pheme has to find a way to warn Principal Zeus.

=== Persephone the Daring ===
Orpheus is a mortal rock god and charms all the girls at Mount Olympus Academy, especially with his latest song about the flighty girl he loves, Eurydice. When Eurydice gets stuck in the Underworld, Orpheus asks Persephone to help get her back.

=== Cassandra the Lucky ===
Cassandra is determined to help people make their own luck, but no one believes her prophecies. She is not even allowed to write the fortunes that go into the cookies her family sells at their Oracle-O Bakery. Determined to prove herself, Cassandra sends some special fortunes along to MOA. Her fortunes reverse, and the goddess girls are determined to find an answer.

=== Athena the Proud ===
Athena plans to improve the Labyrinth for King Minos, but her efforts have unexpected results.

=== Iris the Colorful ===
When Principal Zeus asks Iris to fetch some magic water from the Underworld's River Styx, she discovers a new ability to travel by rainbow. Iris hopes Zeus will make her the goddess of rainbows. Also, she wonders if her crush Zephyrus prefers her best friend, Antheia.

=== Aphrodite the Fair ===
When Ares's sister Eris, the goddess of discord and strife, visits on his birthday, she brings a shiny golden apple trophy that reads "For the fairest". The contest for the trophy threatens Athena and Aphrodite's friendship.

=== Medusa the Rich ===
Medusa develops the Midas touch, suddenly becoming able to turn objects into gold just by touching them, but when it is not just objects but food and even people that become golden, she realizes the dangers.

=== Amphitrite the Bubbly ===
Amphitrite, a mergirl in the Aegean Sea, has only one wish, and is to see the world, but unlike her sisters and other merpeople she cannot shapeshift her tail into legs to walk on land. When her twin sister Thetis is invited to join Poseidon in the Temple Games, Amphitrite takes her place. She has fun and adventure during the Games, until Gaia, the goddess of the earth, and her sons the giants crash the party.

=== Hestia the Invisible ===
Hestia, feeling unseen at Mount Olympus Academy, decides to become more noticeable. With help from Pheme, the goddess of gossip, and a godboy named Asca, she decides to step further. Hestia's point of view starts with coming to MOA (Mount Olympus Academy) when she was in third grade. Since then, she has always "hidden" under her "armor" as the three Gray Ladies call her disguise. When a contest comes for the best symbol, she becomes famous and becomes one of the finalists. After that, Hestia has changed to become less shy but still has the same kindness.

=== Echo the Copycat ===
Echo, a forest-mountain nymph, likes to copy anything she finds cool, but everyone finds her copycat ways annoying.

=== Calliope the Muse ===
Calliope is full of clever ideas for enlivening the academy and loves to inspire others, but she has trouble inspiring herself.

=== Pallas the Pal ===
Pallas, a mortal girl, signs up for a swordplay competition at the temple of her old best friend, Athena. She is excited to see Athena again, until she learns that Athena has made some new best friends at MOA.

=== Nyx the Mysterious ===
Nyx, the Goddess of the Night, visits the academy.

=== Medea the Enchantress ===
Medea uses her magic to help her friend Jason obtain the Golden Fleece.

=== Eos the Lighthearted ===
Eos is the Goddess of Dawn and is a friends with her opposite, Nyx the Mysterious. She does not want to attend the academy, blaming Zeus for the imprisonment of her father.

=== Clotho the Fate ===
Eleven-year-old Clotho, one of the Three Fates, wants to win the respect of unhappy mortals, even if it risks violating one of Zeus's strict rules.

=== Persephone the Grateful ===
In the Underworld, Persephone and Hades meet the naiad Minthe.

=== Hecate the Witch ===
Hecate meets the ghost herder Melinoe in a pet cemetery. Soon she is overwhelmed by ghost pets who have unfinished business on Earth.

=== Artemis the Hero ===
Artemis and Alpheus clash over a river nymph's precious cup.

=== Elpis the Hopeful ===
Zeus chooses the bubbly Elpis to be Spirit of Hope at the Academy.

=== Time Travelers ===
The Goddess Girls travel in time to find out what really happened on the day when Athena arrived at the Academy and meet their Roman equivalents.
