= Andrew Clements =

American writer (1949–2019)

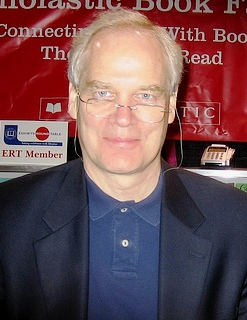
- Clements at a Scholastic book fair in 2008
- Born: Andrew Elborn Clements; May 29, 1949; Camden, New Jersey, U.S.
- Died: November 28, 2019 (aged 70); Baldwin, Maine, U.S.
- Occupations: Writer, editor, educator
- Spouse: Rebecca Pierpont
- Children: 4
- Writing career
- Period: 1985–2019
- Genre: Children's literature
- Website: andrewclements.com

Andrew Elborn Clements (May 29, 1949 – November 28, 2019) was an American author of children's literature. His debut novel Frindle won an award determined by the vote of U.S. schoolchildren in about 20 different U.S. states. In June 2015, Frindle was named the Phoenix Award winner for 2016, as it was deemed the best book that did not win a major award when it was published.

== Life ==
Clements was born in Camden, New Jersey, and lived in nearby Oaklyn and Cherry Hill before moving to Springfield, Illinois as a pre-teen. As a child, he enjoyed summers at a lakeside cabin in Maine where he spent his days swimming, hiking, water skiing, and his evenings reading books. After graduating with a Bachelor of Arts in English literature from Northwestern University and a Masters of Arts in elementary education from National Louis University, he worked as a teacher, sharing his love of reading with elementary, middle, and high school students.

He worked for several publishing companies where he published, acquired, edited, marketed, and developed quality children's books. In 1985, Clements added his own work to the market with a picture book entitled Bird Delbert. His first novel was the award-winning Frindle, which has won 16 state book awards, as well as the Christopher Award.

Clements was married to the former Rebecca Pierpont, and they had four sons. He died at his home in Baldwin, Maine, on November 28, 2019, at age 70 from an undisclosed illness.

== Awards ==
The Children's Literature Association named Frindle the best English-language children's book published in 1996 that did not win a major contemporary book award, thus making it the winner of the Phoenix Award for 2016.

=== Contemporary Awards ===
- 2001: Utah Children's Choice Award
- 1999–2000: Pennsylvania Young Reader's Choice Award
- 1999: Texas Children's Crown Award
- 1999: Pacific Northwest Library Association Young Reader's Choice, (WA, OR, MT, AK, ID, AB, BC)
- 1999: South Dakota Prairie Pasque Award
- 1999: Sasquatch Children's Book Award, (WA)
- 1999: Rebecca Caudill Young Readers Award, (IL)

1998–1999: Maryland Black-Eyed Susan Book Award, 4–6

- 1998–1999: Young Hoosier Book Award, (IN)
- 1998–1999: North Carolina Children's Choice Award
- 1998–1999: Nevada Young Readers' Award
- 1998–1999: Charlie May Simon Children's Book Award, (AR)
- 1998–1999: Maud Hart Lovelace Award, MN Youth Reading Award
- 1998–1999: Georgia Children's Book Award
- 1998–1999: William Allen White Children's Book Award, (KS)
- 1998–1999: Massachusetts Children's Book Award
- 1998: Prize Cento, Cento, Italy
- 1998: Rhode Island Children's Book Award
- 1997–1998: Great Stone Face Book Award, (NH)
- 1997: Judy Lopez Memorial Honor Book (L.A.)Award
- 1997: Christopher Award
- 1998–1999 Georgia children's book award

=== Listings and recommendations ===
- 1999: Capitol Choices list, best books for ages 7–10
- 1998: Chicago Public Library's Best of the Best
- 1997–1998: Indiana Read-Alouds Too Good to Miss
- 1997: Horn Book Magazine Fanfare Book
- 1997: Parents' Choice Honor Book
- 1996: New York Public Library One Hundred Titles for Reading and Sharing

=== Other ===
- 2004: California Young Readers Medal, The School Story
- 2004: American Library Association Schneider Family Book Award, Things Not Seen
- 2007: Edgar Allan Poe Award for best juvenile book, Room One: A Mystery or Two
- 2015: Phoenix Award for Frindle

== Bibliography ==
=== For all ===
- (As Andrew Elborn) Noah and the Ark and the Animals, illustrated by Ivan Gantschev, Picture Book Studio (Saxonville, MA), 1987.
- Santa's Secret Helper, illustrated by Deborah Santini, Picture Book Studio (Saxonville, MA), 1990.
- Temple Cat, illustrated by Alan Marks, Picture Book Studio, 1991, illustrated by Kate Kiesler, Clarion (New York, NY), 1996.
- Mother Earth's Counting Book, illustrated by Lonni Sue Johnson, Picture Book Studio, 1992.
- Billy and the Bad Teacher, illustrated by Elivia Savadier, Picture Book Studio, 1992.
- Who Owns the Cow?, illustrated by Joan Landis, Clarion (New York, NY), 1995.
- Bright Christmas: An Angel Remembers, illustrated by Kate Kiesler, Clarion (New York, NY), 1996.
- Frindle (middle-grade novel), illustrated by Brian Selznick, Simon & Schuster (New York, NY), 1996.
- (Adapter) Philipp's Birthday Book, illustrated by Hanne Turk, North-South Books, 1996.
- Riff's BeBop Book, Simon & Schuster (New York, NY), 1996.
- Real Monsters Go for the Mold!, illustrated by Matthew Stoddart, Simon & Schuster (New York, NY), 1997.
- Things That Go EEK on Halloween, illustrated by George Ulrich, Simon & Schuster (New York, NY), 1997.
- Real Monsters Stage Fright, illustrated by Matthew Stoddart, Simon & Schuster (New York, NY), 1997.
- Music Time, Any Time!, illustrated by Tom Leigh, Simon & Schuster (New York, NY), 1997.
- Double Trouble in Walla Walla, illustrated by Salvatore Murdocca, Millbrook Press (Brookfield, CT), 1997.
- Workshop, illustrated by David Wisniewski, Clarion (New York, NY), 1998.
- Gromble's Haunted Halloween, Simon & Schuster (New York, NY), 1998.
- Hey Dad, Could I Borrow Your Hammer?, illustrated by Jackie Snider, Millbrook Press (Brookfield, CT), 1999.
- The Landry News, (middle-grade novel), illustrated by Salvatore Murdocca, Simon & Schuster (New York, NY), 1999.
- Look Who's in the Thanksgiving Play!, illustrated by Mavis Smith, Little Simon (New York, NY), 1999.
- The Mouse Family, illustrated by Simon Galkin, Little Simon (New York, NY), 2000.
- The Janitor's Boy, Simon & Schuster (New York, NY), 2000.
- Circus Family Dog, illustrated by Sue Truesdell, Clarion (New York, NY), 2000.
- The Christmas Kitten, illustrated by Simon Galkin, Little Simon (New York, NY), 2000.
- The School Story, illustrated by Brian Selznick, Simon & Schuster (New York, NY), 2001.
- Things Not Seen (middle-grade novel), Philomel (New York, NY), 2002.
- The Jacket (originally serialized in Boston Globe), illustrated by McDavid Henderson, Simon & Schuster (New York, NY), 2002.
- A Week in the Woods, Simon & Schuster (New York, NY), 2002.
- Slippers at Home, illustrated by Janie Bynum, Dutton (New York, NY), 2004.
- Naptime for Slippers, illustrated by Janie Bynum, Dutton (New York, NY), 2004.
- The Report Card, illustrated by Brian Selznick, Simon & Schuster (New York, NY), 2004.
- The Last Holiday Concert, Simon & Schuster (New York, NY), 2004.
- Slippers at School, illustrated by Janie Bynum, Dutton (New York, NY), 2005.
- Slippers Loves to Run, illustrated by Janie Bynum, Dutton (New York, NY), 2005.
- A Million Is a Lot of Dots, illustrated by Rob Roth, Simon & Schuster (New York, NY), 2005.
- Lunch Money, Simon & Schuster (New York, NY), 2005.
- Things Hoped For, Philomel Books (New York, NY), 2006
- Room One: A Mystery or Two, Simon & Schuster (New York, NY), 2006
- No Talking, Simon & Schuster (New York, NY), 2007
- Things That Are, Simon & Schuster (New York, NY), 2008
- Lost and Found, Atheneum Books (New York, NY), 2008
- Extra Credit, Simon & Schuster (New York, NY), 2009
- Troublemaker, Atheneum Books (New York, NY), 2011
- About Average, Atheneum Books {New York}, 2012
- The Map Trap, Atheneum Books (New York, NY), 2014
- The Losers Club, Random House Books for Young Readers (New York, NY), 2017
- The Friendship War, Random House Books for Young Readers (New York, NY), 2019
- The Frindle Files, Random House Books for Young Readers (New York, NY), 2024

=== Pets to the Rescue series ===
- Ringo Saves the Day!: A True Story, illustrated by Ellen Beier, Simon & Schuster (New York, NY), 2001.
- Brave Norman: A True Story, illustrated by Ellen Beier, Simon & Schuster (New York, NY), 2001.
- Tara and Tiree, Fearless Friends: A True Story, illustrated by Ellen Beier, Simon & Schuster (New York, NY), 2002.
- Dolores and the Big Fire: A True Story, illustrated by Ellen Beier, Simon & Schuster (New York, NY), 2002.

=== Jake Drake series ===
- Jake Drake Know-It-All, illustrated by Dolores Avenaño, Simon & Schuster (New York, NY), 2001.
- Jake Drake, Bully Buster, illustrated by Amanda Harvey, Simon & Schuster (New York, NY), 2001.
- Jake Drake, Teacher's Pet, illustrated by Dolores Avenaño, Simon & Schuster (New York, NY), 2002.
- Jake Drake, Class Clown, illustrated by Dolores Avenaño, Simon & Schuster (New York, NY), 2002.

=== Benjamin Pratt and the Keepers of the School series ===
- We the Children, Atheneum Books (New York, NY), 2010
- Fear Itself, Atheneum Books (New York, NY), 2011
- The Whites of Their Eyes, Atheneum Books (New York, NY), 2012
- In Harm's Way, Atheneum Books (New York, NY), 2013 (with Adam Stower)
- We Hold These Truths, Atheneum Books (New York, NY), 2013

=== Reading program books ===
- Karen's Island, Houghton Mifflin (Boston, MA), 1995.
- Three Wishes for Buster, Houghton Mifflin (Boston, MA), 1995.
- Bill Picket: An American Original, Texas Style, Houghton Mifflin (Boston, MA), 1996.
- Hurricane Andrew, Houghton Mifflin (Boston, MA), 1998.
- Ham and Eggs for Jack, Houghton Mifflin (Boston, MA), 1998.
- Life in the Desert, Steck-Vaughn, 1998.
- Desert Treasure, illustrated by Wayne Anthony Still, Steck-Vaughn, 1998.
- Inventors: Making Things Better, Steck-Vaughn, 1998.
- Milo's Great Invention, illustrated by Johnansen Newman, Steck-Vaughn, 1998.
