= The Jacket (book) =

2001 book by Andrew Clements

- First edition
- Author: Andrew Clements
- Language: English
- Subject: Racism
- Genre: Children's fiction
- Published: 2001, Boston Globe (serialization); 2003, Atheneum Books
- Publication place: United States
- Media type: Print, ebook
- Pages: 89 pages
- ISBN: 0756914345

The Jacket is a 2001 children's book by author Andrew Clements. It was first published in 2001 as a serialized story that ran in the Boston Globe and was later published in book format on August 1, 2003 through Atheneum Books. The work centers upon a young boy that discovers that although he doesn't identify as racist or discriminatory, he does have deep-seated and unconscious prejudices that prompt him to immediately suspect the worst about a black student at his school.

Clements based the book's premise around a similar situation that occurred in his life, where his brother mistakenly believed that an African-American boy had stolen his jacket and confronted him over the theft. Since its release, the book has been utilized in classrooms as a way to illustrate different types of racism.

== Synopsis ==
Schoolboy Phil has never viewed himself as racist, but he's forced to rethink his stance when he accuses Daniel of stealing an imported jacket. Daniel, who is African-American, was given the jacket as a gift by his grandmother, who works for Phil's mother as a housekeeper and had received the jacket as a hand-me-down. Phil immediately begins to rethink his actions, wondering if he would have treated the situation differently if Daniel had been white instead of black. Tortured by self-doubt, Phil looks at his immediate surroundings and is saddened when he realizes that he has likely been influenced by his father, who is openly bigoted.

== Reception ==
Critical reception was mostly positive. Publishers Weekly praised The Jacket, commenting that while the book lacked subtlety, it "pointedly delivers a timely message and can serve as a springboard for dialogue about tolerance and self-honesty".
