= The School Story =

Book by Andrew Clements

- Cover of first edition, 2001
- Author: Andrew Clements
- Audio read by: Spencer Kayden
- Illustrator: Brian Selznick
- Cover artist: Brian Selznick
- Language: English
- Genre: Children's literature
- Publisher: Simon & Schuster
- Publication date: 2001
- Publication place: United States
- Media type: Print (hardcover & paperback)

The School Story is a 2001 children's novel by American author Andrew Clements. It is about two twelve-year-old girls who try to get a school story published.

The audiobook is narrated by American actress Spencer Kayden.

== Plot summary ==
As the novel begins, twelve-year-old Natalie is almost done writing a novel called The Cheater about a girl and her friends. It is uncommon, if not impossible, for someone her age to get published, but Natalie's best friend, Zoe Reisman, thinks The Cheater is good enough. Natalie wants her mother, Hannah Nelson, who works as an editor at Shipley Junior Books, to edit her manuscript, but she doesn't want her mother to find out that she wrote it. To accomplish this, Natalie uses the pseudonym Cassandra Day, and Zoe acts as her literary agent, fabricating the "Sherry Clutch Literary Agency". Zoe hides her identity by using her nickname, "Zee Zee", and pronouncing her last name differently. The girls decide to rent a cheap "instant office", then realize that they could use some adult help. They enlist a teacher at their school, Laura Clayton, to be their adviser, and together with the three form "The Publishing Club". Zoe gives Ms. Clayton $500 to pay for the office and services but feeling guilty, Ms. Clayton secretly pays for it herself and safely stores Zoe's money away in her bank account.

Besides the girls' age disadvantage, the editor in chief at Shipley, "Lethal" Letha Springfield, adds complications. Seeing that The Cheater could prove to be a success, Letha takes over editing the manuscript. Zoe (speaking as Zee Zee) gets into an argument with her and states that Cassandra (Natalie) will only write with Hannah as her editor. Instead of obliging, Letha refuses and declares that the book will not be published by Shipley unless an apology is received. This problem is averted when Zoe sends a copy of the manuscript directly to Tom Morton, president of Shipley, along with a letter describing Cassandra's wishes. After reading (and loving) the story, Tom tells Letha to let Hannah handle it. Later, when the girls are offered a contract, they show it to Zoe's father, who is a lawyer, and they get Natalie's Uncle Fred to sign in place of her mother. After hearing the story from the girls, Zoe's father is extremely impressed with Ms. Clayton and calls to commend her. He also gets her to send him a bill for the office.
