= Things That Are =

2008 novel

- Author: Andrew Clements
- Language: English
- Series: Things Not Seen
- Genre: Young adult fiction, science fiction
- Publisher: Philomel Books
- Publication date: 2008
- Publication place: United States
- ISBN: 978-0-399-24691-3
- OCLC: 216938211
- LC Class: PZ7.C59118 Tgv 2008
- Preceded by: Things Hoped For

Things That Are is a young-adult book by Andrew Clements. Released in 2008 by Philomel Books, the book is a sequel to Things Hoped For.

== Plot ==
The story is about 17-year-old Alicia, Bobby's girlfriend who the reader learned about in Things Not Seen. The main plot centers around her journey of self-reassurance and courage. The story also includes short exchanges between Alicia and her "brain fairy" in which they argue over a present topic. The "brain fairy" always annoys Alicia and calls her names. The story starts out with Bobby coming home from New York to Chicago to visit Alicia. He was unknowingly followed by an invisible man named William. The FBI start to intervene because of an arrest warrant on William. Alicia and Bobby then help William use an electric blanket to return him to his previous state. William then returns to his wife and daughter in Montreal.

== Characters ==
=== Main ===
- Alicia Van Dorn – A 17-year-old girl who is blind.
- Bobby Phillips (known as Robert Phillips in Things Hoped For) – Alicia's boyfriend but friend before.

=== Minor ===
- Mr. Van Dorn – Alicia's dad, a professor
- Mrs. Van Dorn – Alicia's mom
- James William Townshend – the invisible man introduced in Things Hoped For
- David Phillips – Bobby's dad, a scientist
- Emily Phillips – Bobby's mom, a professor
