= The Janitor's Boy =

Book by Andrew Clements

- First edition
- Author: Andrew Clements
- Cover artist: Brian Selznick
- Language: English
- Subject: Language Arts
- Genre: children's literature
- Publisher: Simon & Schuster
- Publication date: 2000
- Publication place: United States
- Pages: 160
- ISBN: 978-0-689-83585-8
- OCLC: 48039831

The Janitor's Boy is a children's book by Andrew Clements. Part of his school series, it was released by Simon & Schuster in 2000.

== Plot summary ==
The book tells the story of Jack Rankin, whose father is the janitor of his school. Jack is made fun of by his friends for this, and he hates his father as a result. Lashing out, he puts a massive quantity of bubble gum up under his desk so that his father will have to clean it off. Unfortunately, he is caught and ends up having to clean it up himself under the supervision of his father. While spending time with his father at work, he learns how hard being a janitor is, and learns that his father joined the army as a teenager to escape his abusive father. Jack and his father become progressively close. As the book closes, a student shouts "You wanna be a janitor when you grow up too?!" and Jack says "Yes I do."
