= Room One =

2006 children's book by Andrew Clements

Room One: A Mystery or Two
- Author: Andrew Clements
- Cover artist: Chris Blair
- Language: English
- Subject: Mystery
- Genre: children's literature
- Publisher: Simon & Schuster
- Publication date: 2006
- Publication place: United States
- Media type: Book
- Pages: 176
- ISBN: 978-0-689-866 86-9
- OCLC: 63519275
- LC Class: PZ7.C59118 Ro 2006

Room One is a children's book written by Andrew Clements. Part of his School series, it was released by Simon & Schuster in 2006. Room One is a Junior Library Guild book, and won the 2007 Edgar Allan Poe Award for Best Juvenile Mystery.

== Summary ==
Room One is a story about sixth-grader Ted Hammond. He is an avid mystery fan and detective. On one of his normal newspaper routes, he looks into the Andersons' house and sees a mysterious face through the attic window. He passes by but soon remembers that the Andersons moved out 2 years ago. Ted becomes determined to find out whose face it is. It turns out to be April (who he thought was Alexa), a girl who lived in the Anderson farm for just a short while. April asks Ted to get them food and supplies. Ted does so happily but has to be sneaky because he is taking it from his own home. Ted not wanting his mom to find him taking extra food, wakes up early in the morning to collect food for April and her family. Ted makes it out safe early in the morning without being caught. At night Ted is caught by his teacher, Mrs. Mitchell, and he explains everything to her. A few days later, April and her family are found by Ted at the farm across the street. Ted then has the idea for the real Alexa, April's mom, and Ted's mom to meet. That plan fails. Ted then is shocked that the town plans a big surprise for them, but the family goes missing. At 8:30 Ted gets a call from April saying that her family are almost in Colorado.
