= The Melting of Maggie Bean =

2007 novel by Tricia Rayburn

- Author: Tricia Rayburn
- Language: English
- Genre: Children's
- Publisher: Aladdin
- Publication date: April 24, 2007
- Publication place: United States
- Media type: Print (paperback)
- Pages: 256 pp
- ISBN: 978-1-4169-3348-9
- OCLC: 123193806
- Followed by: Maggie Bean Stays Afloat

The Melting of Maggie Bean is a children's novel by Tricia Rayburn, published in 2007. The book follows the titular Maggie Bean's quest to lose weight and join her school's synchronized swim team.

== Plot ==
Maggie Bean is an average seventh grader who is having a tough year. Her father has lost his job and her mother is stressed about money, so Maggie focuses on maintaining her average grades and overeating chocolate. This all changes when Maggie gets a chance to try out for the synchronized swim team. Becoming a Water Wing has always been Maggie's dream. She and her friend Aimee work towards their goal so that Maggie will no longer be a social outcast. She is also forced to join the "Pound Patrollers", a club of other heavy people, where she meets Arnie, another chunky boy of her age who turns out to be Peter's cousin. She forms a friendship with him. At school, she also gets closer to Peter, although not as a boyfriend and girlfriend. Maggie, Summer (her sister), and Aimee work together to help Maggie's dad find a job. She also begins to lose weight and takes nearly 20 pounds off her original 186. She eats less, gets rid of her chocolate, and practices for the Water Wings tryouts, which she eventually nails. Cocaptains Julia and Anabel, however, keep her off the team, causing Maggie to become depressed. Later, her gym teacher realizes this and offers Maggie a chance to join the Water Wings or the regular swim team, and she chooses the latter. Her dad also makes progress towards getting a job through Maggie's help.

=== Characters ===
Maggie Bean is a self-conscious seventh grader whose father has recently lost his job. Maggie is a straight-A student and has a crush on Peter Applewood, a baseball player. Maggie dislikes Anabel Richards and Julia Swanson, the captains of the Water Wings, but she envies them for their bodies and popularity. To deal with the stress of her father losing his job, Maggie does what she knows best: eating a chocolate and getting straight A's.

Peter Applewood is a popular, good looking baseball player and Maggie's crush. He is quite nice to Maggie and is her locker neighbor at school. Aimee thinks he may like Julia Swanson, though it is revealed she was actually just stalking him and only thought they were going out.

Arnie is Peter Applewood's cousin and a boy that Maggie met at the Pound Patrollers. Arnie is also overweight like Maggie and he plays the flute. He hopes to start a business someday.

Aimee McDougall is Maggie's well-intentioned, athletic best friend who encourages her to try out for the Water Wings. She is prettier and skinnier than Maggie and has a long list of admirers, but still sticks up for Maggie and helps her.

Anabel Richards and Julia Swanson are the popular queens of the seventh grade and also the cocaptains of Water Wings. Julia seems to be the more evil one, who more openly mocks Maggie and tries to get Peter, while Anabel seems a little nicer, as at the Water Wings tryouts she actually encourages Maggie and seems to express a little guilt at keeping her off the team.

Summer Bean is Maggie's encouraging younger sister and is ten years old.

Aunt Violetta is Maggie's overweight aunt who convinces Maggie to try the Pound Patrollers to lose weight.

== Development and publication ==
Tricia Rayburn began writing a novel while attending university. One of her elective classes was Reading and Writing Children's Literature, for which the final assignment was to write the first thirty pages of a young adult novel. Using her own childhood for inspiration, Rayburn came up with the image of a girl in a store trying to decide which candy she should buy.

After she completed the assignment Rayburn continued to work on the novel for her own enjoyment and eventually finished a first draft, which became her MFA thesis. Having not considered it before, Rayburn was struck by a sudden thought during a meeting with her MFA adviser and asked whether she should seek publication. She sent out several query letters to agents, without expecting a result, and received her first reply two days later.

Rayburn signed with the Writers House agency and began to revise the novel with the help of her agent, Rebecca Sherman. Until this time, the character of Maggie Bean had been called Lucy Moon, but Rayburn had to change it because someone else was already using the name in their novel. Once this and other changes had been made, the novel was sent out to editors; it was accepted by Simon & Schuster and published as one of the six launch titles for their new Aladdin MIX imprint.

== Reception ==
Entertainment Weekly, Kliatt and Teens Read Too all applauded the novel for its realism.

Rayburn's characterisation came in for particular praise, with Kliatt saying of Maggie that "her personality practically jumps off the page", and that the supporting characters are "nuanced" and "just as well-throughout". Entertainment Weekly described the titular character as "a resourceful, likeable kid" but felt that she is "simply drawn".

School Library Journal called the novel "thoughtful" and "empowering", while Kliatt thought it "engaging" and "earnest". Teens Read Too said it "will inspire readers everywhere", rating the book as "5 Stars" and gaving it a Gold Award. Entertainment Weekly graded the book as a "B".
