= A Week in the Woods =

Children's book by Andrew Clements

- Book Cover
- Author: Andrew Clements
- Genre: Children's literature
- Publisher: Simon & Schuster
- Publication date: 2002
- Publication place: USA
- Pages: 190
- ISBN: 978-0-689-85802-4
- OCLC: 54831519

A Week in the Woods is a children's book written by Andrew Clements. Part of his School series, it was released by Simon & Schuster in 2002.

== Plot ==
At school, Mark chooses not to make friends, not to complete his work, not to even become involved, deciding that his time at school will be temporary and that he has nothing to gain. However, he gradually starts to become friends with other students in his class and develops a genuine interest in attending the "Week in the Woods", despite rudely rejecting Mr. Maxwell's initial offer. Mr. Maxwell reluctantly allows him to attend and Mark enjoys spending time in the woods with his new friends.

As Mr. Maxwell and Mark's impressions of one another begin to improve, it is quickly derailed when a knife belonging to Mark's friend is found in their tent. Mark decides to take the blame, believing that Mr. Maxwell is looking for an excuse to send him away. When Mark's prediction proves to be true and he is told to go home early, Mark tries to prove that he can survive in the woods on his own. Mr. Maxwell soon realizes that he has been treating Mark unfairly when he discovers Mark did not bring the knife and is distressed to learn that Mark has disappeared into the woods. Though Mr. Maxwell finds Mark, he is injured and needs to rely on Mark for them to return safely to the campgrounds. They come to an understanding with one another during their return and promise to be more open to one another in the future.

== Awards ==
The book was critically acclaimed, and nominated for a number of awards, including California Young Reader Medal, Golden Sower Masterlist (NE), Kentucky Bluegrass Award, and the Land of Enchantment Children's Master List (NM). The book won the Iowa Children's Choice Awards (2004–2005). and the Keystone to Reading Book Award of Pennsylvania (2005). In total, the book won 3 awards and was nominated for 4 times.

| | Award | Year |
|---|---|---|
| Iowa Children's Choice Award | Awarded | 2004-2005 |
| Keystone to Reading Book Award | Awarded | 2005 |
| Children's Choices, ILA/CBC | Awarded | ? |
| Nebraska Golden Sower Award | Nominated | 2006 |
| Kentucky Bluegrass Award | Nominated | ? |
| Land of Enchantment Children's Master List | Nominated | ? |
| California Young Reader Medal | Nominated | 2006-2007 |

== Bibliography ==
- A Week in the Woods. Simon & Schuster. September 20, 2002. ISBN 978-0-689-85974-8.
