= Things Hoped For =

Book by Andrew Clements

- Author: Andrew Clements
- Language: English
- Genre: Science fiction
- Publisher: Philomel
- Publication date: 2006
- ISBN: 978-0-399-24350-9
- OCLC: 62127717
- LC Class: PZ7.C59118 Tfu 2006
- Preceded by: Things Not Seen
- Followed by: Things That Are

Things Hoped For is a young adult book by Andrew Clements. Released in 2006 by Philomel Books, the book is a sequel to Things Not Seen. It is followed by Things That Are.

== Plot ==
After her Grandfather mysteriously leaves their large house in New York City, Gwen tries to continue her life as normally as possible while practicing hard for her violin auditions. Ignoring the constant and rudely demanding and angry visits of a greedy great-uncle wanting the house. She then meets Robert (Bobby) from Things Not Seen in a cafe. Robert is in town also preparing for trumpet auditions. Gwen invites Robert to stay in her empty house with her to help get him out of the hotel he was staying in. After becoming good friends in the following days, while shopping in a store in New York City they spot a faint shadow apparently coming from an invisible person. Robert then tells Gwen that two years ago he turned invisible.

In the following days, Robert discovers Gwen's grandfather died in the freezer. Her grandfather went in with an oxygen bottle, thick clothes, and left the refrigerator slightly open so he could have left if he wanted to. The other invisible man is discovered in Gwen's house shortly after her grandfather's body is found. The man, named William, is seeking out Robert to find out how to undo his invisibility. William is revealed to be a dangerous thief who threatens them recklessly. Gwen is distraught, but gets a phone call from Alicia, Robert's girlfriend, asking her to play violin. Alicia thanks Gwen for the beautiful song. On the day of Gwen's audition, she opens an envelope with dog tags with a code leading to the title of a Bible passage. The passage says, "There is no greater love than this, that a man lay down his life for his friends". Gwen finally understood why her grandfather did what he did, and she walks confidently into her audition.

== Characters ==
=== Main ===
- Gwendolyn "Gwen" Page - A girl, the main character, and the narrator who is trying to practice her violin auditions.
- Robert Phillips (Also known as Bobby) - A boy who is preparing for trumpet auditions. He was invisible in Things Not Seen.

=== Minor ===
- Lawrence Page (Gwen's grandfather)
- Uncle Henry "Hank" Page - Gwen's great-uncle
- William - A man who is invisible who Gwen and Robert see in a shoe store and also goes into Gwen's house when the police arrived
- Alicia Van Dorn - Bobby's blind girlfriend.
