= Frindle =

1996 novel by Andrew Clements

- Front cover: Nicholas "Nick" Allen holding a "frindle", or pen
- Author: Andrew Clements
- Illustrator: Brian Selznick
- Cover artist: Selznick
- Genre: Realistic fiction
- Publisher: Simon & Schuster Books for Young Readers
- Publication date: December 19, 1996
- Publication place: United States
- Media type: Print (hardcover, paperback)
- Pages: 105 pages
- ISBN: 0-689-80669-8
- OCLC: 38482602
- LC Class: PZ7.C59118 Fr 1996

Frindle is a middle-grade American children's novel written by Andrew Clements, illustrated by Brian Selznick, and published by Aladdin Paperbacks in 1996. It was the winner of the 2016 Phoenix Award, which is granted by the Children's Literature Association annually to recognize one English-language children's book published twenty years earlier that did not win a major literary award at the time of publication.

Frindle was Clements's first novel; all of his previous works had been picture books. According to Clements, the book originated from the thought, "What would happen if a kid started using a new word, and other kids really liked it, but his teacher didn't?"

== Plot ==
Nicholas "Nick" Allen is a class clown who has been formulating creative schemes throughout grade school. At the start of fifth grade in 1998, he is unhappy because his English teacher is the no-nonsense Mrs. Granger. One day, in an attempt to distract the teacher from announcing a homework assignment at the end of a class period, Nick decides to question Mrs. Granger on where each word in the dictionary comes from. This backfires, as Mrs. Granger assigns him to write an essay about it. From researching this question, Nick learns that individuals get to determine what words mean. When he comes across a gold-colored pen in the street, he decides to give a "pen" a new name: frindle.

Nick's classmates like the idea and soon, every child in the fifth grade starts using the word frindle. Mrs. Granger makes any students who are caught saying frindle stay after school and write lines, but this proves to be a problem, as this causes almost every student to stay after school. The school principal decides to visit Nick's house to end the use of frindle, but the situation is beyond Nick's personal control, and the word's usage cannot be curtailed. Frindle starts to gain national attention, and a family friend purchases the merchandising rights to the word. The word frindle spreads across the nation, and Nick thinks through the trouble that this one scheme has caused.

In the epilogue, Nick is a young adult. Mrs. Granger sends him a new copy of the dictionary, recently updated to include new words, including the word frindle. She includes a letter, in which she explains that she intentionally stood against the word to make it more popular (à la the Streisand effect). Nick sends back a present—the frindle that started it all, engraved with the words, "This object belongs to Mrs. Lorelei Granger, and she may call it any name she chooses."

== Awards and honors ==
The U.S. National Education Association named Frindle one of "Teachers' Top 100 Books for Children" based on a 2007 online poll.

In 2012, it was ranked number 38 among all-time children's novels in a survey published by School Library Journal, a monthly with a primarily U.S. audience.

The book has received more than 35 awards and honors, including among other schoolchildren's choice awards:

- Judy Lopez Memorial Honor Book (L.A.), Award 97
- 1998–99 Maud Hart Lovelace Award, MN Youth Rdg. Award
- Prize Cento, 1998, Cento, Italy
- Year 1999 Young Hoosier Book Award
- 2016 Phoenix Award

== Sequel ==
The Frindle Files, a sequel to Frindle and set a generation after the first book, was published posthumously by Random House on August 27, 2024. The cover art was created by Clements' longtime collaborator Brian Selznick.

== Film adaptation ==
In 2015, it was announced that a film adaptation was in development with Mike Karz and Bill Bindley producing and Sam Harper penning the script. Susan Sarandon signed on to portray Mrs. Lorelei Granger. As of 2026, no further development has been announced.
