= Extra Credit =

Book by Andrew Clements

- Author: Andrew Clements
- Language: English
- Genre: Children's literature
- Publisher: Simon & Schuster
- Publication date: June 23, 2009
- Publication place: United States
- Media type: Print (Hardback & Paperback)
- Pages: 183
- ISBN: 1-4169-4929-1

Extra Credit is a 2009 children's novel written by Andrew Clements. The work was first published on June 23, 2009 through Simon & Schuster and follows a young schoolgirl who is given the option of receiving extra credit by writing to an overseas pen pal in a small Afghanistan village. The book won a Christopher Award for Books for Young People in 2010.

== Plot ==
The protagonist of Extra Credit is a 6th grade girl named Abby who is falling behind in her classes. In order to improve her grades so that she will be able to go to Junior High, Abby has to write to a pen pal in another country for extra credit. The teachers of the Afghani town Abby writes to want Sadeed to respond because his English is the best, but the head elder does not think it would be right for a boy and girl to write to one another. Instead, Sadeed's sister Amira is chosen to write with Abby. However, Sadeed secretly writes the letters and Amira just signs them. Eventually Sadeed gets annoyed that Amira gets all the credit for the letters and writes a secret letter to Abby, telling her that he was the one writing the letters.

== Reception ==
The book has received multiple reviews. Two critics for the Horn Book Guide reviewed Extra Credit, with one writing that "Although the ending is a little too neat, it’s the kind of ending kids like, and Clements’s timely story should receive high marks from middle-grade and early-middle-school readers." Publishers Weekly praised the work, as they liked that Clements discussed different cultures in a way that could be understood and appreciated by younger readers.

=== Awards ===
- Christopher Award for Books for Young People (2010, won)
