= Ivan Gantschev =

Bulgarian-German illustrator and author (1925–2014)

Ivan Gantschev

Ivan Gantschev (4 January 1925 – 29 June 2014) was a Bulgarian-German illustrator and author of children's books.

== Biography ==
Ivan Gantschev was born in Veliko Tarnovo, Bulgaria. His father was a lawyer and his mother a school teacher. He attended the Academy of Fine Arts in Sofia. After leaving the academy he worked as an artist and graphic designer. In 1967 he left Bulgaria and settled in Frankfurt, Germany where he lived until his death in 2014.

In 1973 he published his first children's book "Mäusemax fliegt um die Welt " with Gakken Co Ltd., Japan.

He illustrated more than 70 books, writing the stories for most of them.

His picture books have been translated into English and have been published in the United Kingdom.

Ivan Gantschev's artwork has been exhibited in solo and group exhibitions around the world.

== Awards ==
- 1982: Kinderbuch Illustrationspreis, Vienna
- 1983-84: Ehrenliste Österreichischer Kinder-und Jugendbuchpreis
- 1985: Golden Medal, Biennale Bratislava

== Exhibitions ==
- 1981: Klingspor Museum Offenbach (solo)
- 1983: Children's Bookshop at the Metropolitan Museum New York (group)
- 1984: Prado (group)
- 1989: Itabashi Museum Japan (solo)
- 1991: Internationale Jugendbuchbibliothek München (solo)
- 1996: Stadtbibiliothek Freising (solo)
- 1997: Jugendbuchmuseum der Stadt Troisdorf (solo)
- 1997: Guest of Honour at the Children's Book Fair, Bologna
- 2007: Guest of Honour at the Jugendbuchmesse in Saarbrücken
- 2008: Guest of Honour at the Immagini della Fantasia, Palazzo Municipale, Sarmede

== Selected works ==
- Der Regen, Gakken Co Ltd., 1974
- Die Leuchtkäferchen, Gakken Co Ltd., 1975
- Die Farben, Gakken Co. Ltd., 1975
- Der Tiger, Gakken co Ltd., 1976, German edition 1976
- Der Stein, Gakken Co. Ltd. 1977
- Ota der Bär, Bohem Press, 1977, Finish edition " Okko Karhu, 1985, French edition "Poutou et le boucheron", 1978, Italian edition " L'orso Ota" , 1985, Swedish edition 1980, Canadian edition " Otto the Bear", 1985, Dutch edition "Ota de Beer", 1978, Danish edition " Bjornen Oskar", 1978, Japanese edition, 1978, English edition " Otto the Bear", 1978
- Der Hase und der Bär, Gakken Co. Ltd. 1978
- Taro der Elefant, Gakken Co. Ltd. 1979
- Wenn ich einmal groß bin, Gakken Co. Ltd.
- Der Honigbär, Gakken Co. Ltd., 1980, French edition " La merveilleuse histoire de premier ours en peluche", 1982, Finnish edition " Kuinka Nallet Saivat alkunsa, 1980
- Ivan der Vulkan, Neugebauer Press, 1980, English edition 1981
- Wo das Glück wohnt, Neugebauer Verlag, 1980, US edition 1994, French edition 1980
- Ben der Vogel, Gakken Co. Ltd., 1981, Mexican edition "Arvore de tico", 1981, South African edition " Freddie se Boom", 1981, Dutch edition " "Ticho de Vogel", 1980
- Der Mondsee, Neugebauer Press, 1981, English edition 1981, Japanese edition 1982, French edition 1983
- Der Weihnachtszug, Bohem Press, 1982, English edition " The Christmas Train" 1982, Canadian edition " The Christmas Train", 1984, Japanese edition, 1985, Spanish edition " El tren de nadal", 1983, French edition " Le train de Noel", 1982, Finnish edition " Joulujuna", 1984, Danish edition, 1982, South African edition " Die Kersfeestrein", 1982
- Ich habe keine Angst Gakken Co. Ltd. 1985
- Die grüne und die graue Insel, Neugebauer Press, 1985, USA, Canadian, Brit. edition 1985
- Wo der Mond wohnt, Neugebauer Verlag 1986, US edition 1998
- Wo steckt Waldemar, Neugebauer Press 1989, English edition 1989
- Guten Morgen, Gute Nacht, Neugebauer Verlag, 1991, English edition 1991
- Der Fremde und die Leute von Kuschkundalowo, Nord Süd Verlag 1991, English Edition 1991
- Der Weihnachtsteddybär, Nord Süd Verlag, 1992, US edition 1994
- Wo der Mond wohnt, Neugebauer Verlag, 1998
- Mascha, Nord Süd Verlag, 1999, Italian edition 1999·
- Drei kleine Kaninchen, Neugebauer Verlag 2001, French edition 2007, English edition 2002
- Drei Teufel, Patmos Verlag 2002
- Die Ostergeschichte, Gütersloher Verlagshaus, 2006
- St. Martin und das Laternenfest, Sauerländer Verlag 2006
- Ein Weihnachtsfest für den Bären, Nord Süd Verlag, 2007, French edition 2007, English edition 2007
- So erzählt es der Mond, Nord Süd Verlag 2008
- Kleine Träumerei, Gütersloher Verlagshaus 2012
