= Joan Holub =

American writer

- Born: 1956 (age 69–70); Texas
- Website: joanholub.com

Joan Holub (born 1956 in Texas) is an author and illustrator of over 180 books for children. She also uses the pen names Rita Book and Brad Bucks.

== Personal life ==
Holub was born in 1956 in Texas. She received a Bachelor of Fine Arts degree from the University of Texas, then freelanced as an art director at a graphic design firm for eight years.

Holub dreamed of working in children's books, so she moved to New York City and became associate art director in Scholastic trade books where she designed books for children and worked with editors and illustrators.

Holub illustrated her first published children's book in 1992 and soon began illustrating full-time. She began completing manuscripts and mailing them out to publishers in the early 1990s. In 1996, she sold her first two manuscripts: A Spooky Lift-the-Flap Book and Pen Pals. Now she writes full-time.

== Awards and honors ==
Mighty Dads is a New York Times bestselling picture book.

Awards for Holub's writing
Year	Title	Award	Result	Ref.
2009	Shampoodle	Cybils Award for Easy Readers	Finalist	
2021	Zero the Hero	Mathical Book List	Honor	

== Selected works ==
- Zero the Hero, a math-centric picture book starring the number Zero and his friends 1 through 9. When Roman numerals sneak attack, Zero finally gets a chance to show his true heroic value.
- Little Red Writing, starred reviews from Kirkus Reviews, Publishers Weekly. This take-off on the Little Red Riding fairytale stars a red pencil, who defeats the Wolf 2000, a pencil sharpener pretending to be the Pencil School principal.
- Mighty Dads, illustrated by James Dean, is a picture book in which dad construction vehicles teach their young construction vehicle children growing-ups skills.
- The Knights Before Christmas, a rhyming parody of 'Twas the Night Before Christmas in which three knights try to fight off the "invading" Santa Claus and his "dragons". Illustrations by Scott Magoon.
- This Little Artist: An Art History Primer, a board book published in 2019 illustrated by Daniel Roode.

=== Written with Suzanne Williams ===
- The Goddess Girls, a middle grade series for ages 8–12 in which each book is about Greek goddesses: Athena, Persephone, Aphrodite, Artemis, Medusa, Pandora, Pheme, and Cassandra. The setting is at Mount Olympus, where they are students at fictional Mount Olympus Academy. School has various subjects such as beauty-ology, spell-ology, garden-ology, hero-ology and many more. In charge is the god of all gods, ruler of Mount Olympus, absent-minded father of Athena, husband of a fly, and of course cheery and supporting yet deeply understanding principal of the academy, the god Zeus. The first book, Athena the Brain, was published in 2010.
- Heroes in Training, an adventure series featuring the young Olympians, Zeus, Poseidon and others, as they confront the tyrannical Titans. Although also drawing on Greek mythology, the series is in a different "universe" from The Goddess Girls. The first book, Zeus and the Thunderbolt of Doom, was published in 2012.
- Grimmtastic Girls, a series in which each book is about a female main character from a fairy tale: Cinderella, Red Riding Hood, Snow White, etc. The setting is a co-educational school called Grimm Academy. The first book, Cinderella Stays Late, was published in 2014.
- Little Goddess Girls, a series in which each book is about characters from Greek mythology, for ages 6–9.
