= Jessica Burkhart =

American writer

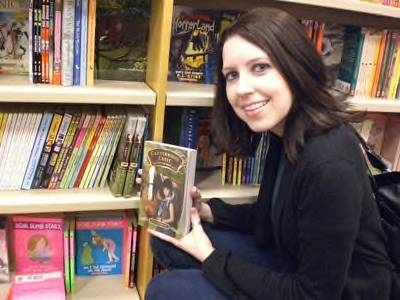
- Born: January 29, 1987 (age 39); Goodlettsville, Tennessee, U.S.
- Education: Florida State University (BA)
- Occupation: Author
- Writing career
- Genres: Tween, young adult
- Notable work: Canterwood Crest
- Website: www.jessicaburkhart.com

Jessica Ashley (born January 29, 1987), better known by her pen name Jessica Burkhart, is an American author. Burkhart works primarily in the tween fiction genre, and is the writer of the Canterwood Crest series of novels.

== Personal life and education ==
During her childhood, Jessica Burkhart took an interest in equestrianism, and later developed a fondness for writing. Her freelance work was eventually featured in a number of magazines, including The Writer. She began college at age 16 and graduated in 2007 with a BA in English from Florida State University.

In 2006, she completed a manuscript as part of National Novel Writing Month. While browsing Burkhart's blog, a literary agent learned of the novel and offered to read it, which eventually led her to sign the author. Afterward, Burkhart's novel, Take the Reins, went through a series of revisions before being put on submission. In May 2007, she signed a four-book deal with Simon & Schuster. As a result, Take the Reins became the first novel in the Canterwood Crest series—a story about disparate schoolgirls engaged in equestrian competitions at an academy.

Throughout 2008, Burkhart worked on additional books in the series while helping to promote the first one online, largely through blogging and vlogging. The Canterwood Crest series was later extended. In 2010, she announced plans to write in the young adult genre under her own surname, while maintaining her work in middle-grade fiction.

It was announced in late 2013, Burkhart would be writing another middle-grade series, West Coast Prep. The series follows another set of characters at a riding school in California, and was self-published as eBooks. Burkhart announced plans to continue the Canterwood Crest series with approximately 20 e-novellas.

== Bibliography ==
=== Canterwood Crest ===
1. Take the Reins (January 2009)
2. Chasing Blue (March 2009)
3. Behind the Bit (May 2009)
4. Triple Fault (August 2009)
5. Best Enemies (October 2009)
6. Little White Lies (December 2009)
7. Rival Revenge (January 2010)
8. Home Sweet Drama (April 2010)
9. City Secrets (July 2010)
10. Elite Ambition (September 2010)
11. Scandals, Rumors, Lies (November 2010)
12. Unfriendly Competition (January 2011)
13. Initiation (January 2, 2012)
14. Popular (May 1, 2012)
15. Comeback (August 7, 2012)
16. Masquerade (September 11, 2012)
17. Jealousy (February 19, 2013)
18. Famous ( June 2013)

=== Canterwood Crest specials ===
- Chosen (May 2011)
- Home for Christmas (November 2013)
