= No Talking =

2007 book by Andrew Clements

- Author: Andrew Clements
- Audio read by: Keith Nobbs
- Illustrator: Mark Elliott
- Language: English
- Genre: Children's literature
- Publisher: Simon & Schuster
- Publication date: June 26, 2007 (hardcover 1st ed.)
- Publication place: United States
- Media type: Print (hardcover & paperback); ebook
- Pages: 160
- ISBN: 978-1-4169-0983-5 (hardcover 1st ed.)
- OCLC: 76261556
- LC Class: PZ7.C59118 No 2007

No Talking is a children's novel written by Andrew Clements and published in 2007 by Simon & Schuster. It also has an audiobook available, narrated by Keith Nobbs.

== Awards ==
The book won the 2010 California Young Reader Medal.
