= The Last Holiday Concert =

2004 novel by Andrew Clements

- Author: Andrew Clements
- Language: English
- Genre: Children's novel
- Publisher: Simon & Schuster
- Publication date: 2004
- Publication place: United States
- Media type: Print (Paperback)
- Pages: 176 pp
- ISBN: 0-689-84516-2
- OCLC: 54853203
- LC Class: PZ7.C59118 Las 2004

The Last Holiday Concert is a 2004 children's novel written by Andrew Clements and illustrated by Brian Selznick. The book concerns a boy who is in charge of the middle-school chorus. Based on a 2007 online poll, the National Education Association listed the book as one of its "Teachers' Top 100 Books for Children."

== Plot summary ==
Hart Evans was the most popular kid at Collins Elementary School and is on his way to owning that title again at Palmer Intermediate. So when he unintentionally shoots a rubber band at his chorus teacher one afternoon, he expects it to be laughed off. After all, it was an accident.

Mr. Meinert, the chorus teacher, is wound so tight that he blows up at Hart and the entire class. In a huff, he announces that he is stepping down, and they are now responsible for planning their entire holiday concert themselves.

The whole class is surprised and elects Hart as the new Chorus director. He declares Music Class as a free period until Mr. Meinert tells him that they've got a full 30 minutes for their show. Hart then realizes that they need to get down to work.

After assembling committees and coming up with lists of songs, Hart finally thinks he has everything running on track. But then his classmates get mad. Why is Hart, their friend, acting so strict and like a teacher? It takes a heart-to-heart with Mr. Meinert to learn what it takes to be a friendly and fair, yet strict, chorus director.

== Reception ==
Reviews of the book were mixed. One reviewer described it as a "belabored tale." A second reviewer felt that the book left the reader "with both good feelings and the idea that both young people and adults are sometimes guilty of underestimating each other." A third reviewer praised the book's "engaging characters."
