= Brian Selznick =

American illustrator and writer (born 1966)

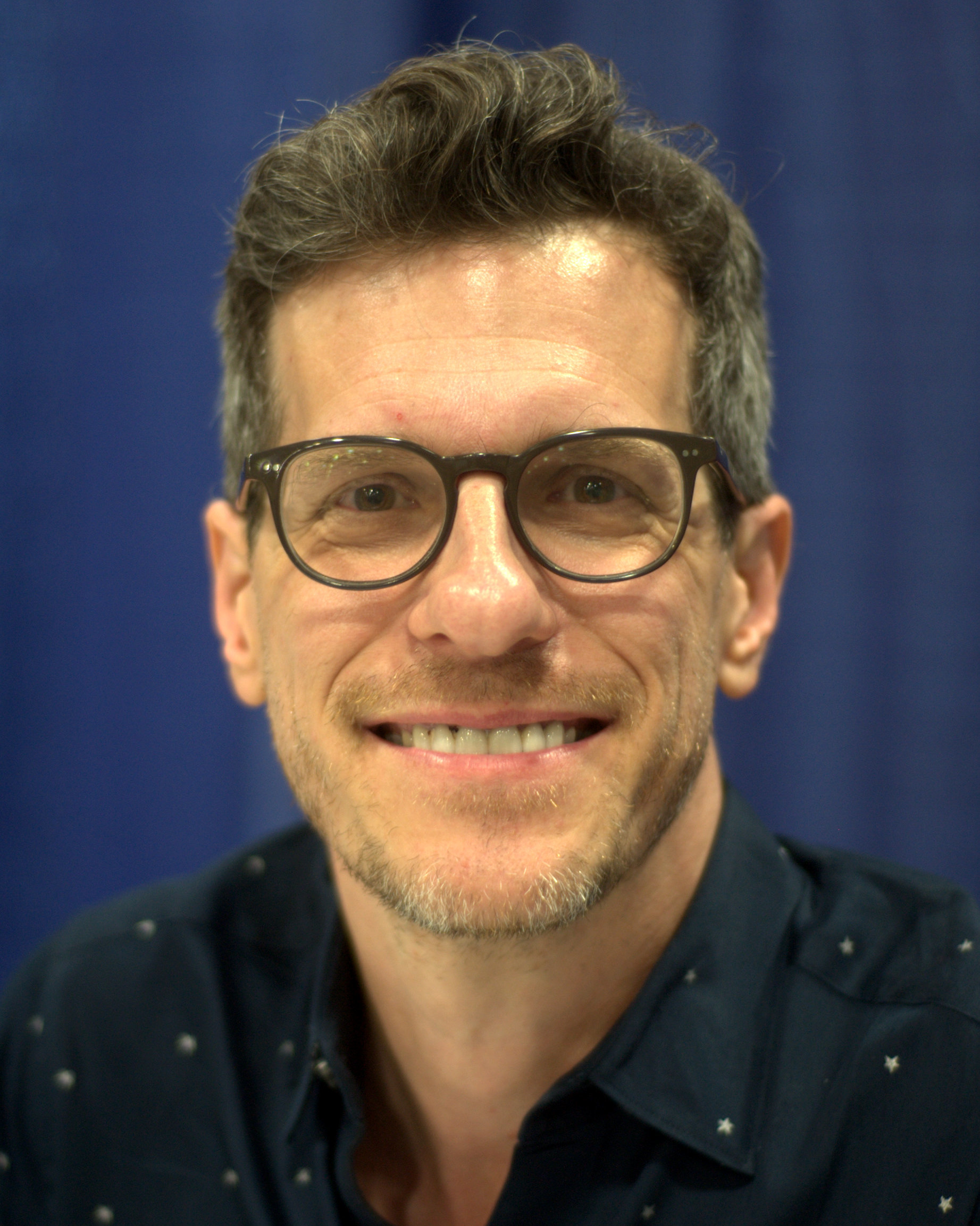
- Selznick at the 2018 National Book Festival
- Born: July 14, 1966 (age 60); East Brunswick Township, New Jersey
- Occupations: Illustrator, writer
- Spouse: David Serlin
- Relatives: David O. Selznick (first cousin twice removed)
- Writing career
- Period: 1991–present
- Genres: Children's picture books, historical novels
- Subjects: Biography, history
- Notable works: Frindle; The Invention of Hugo Cabret; Wonderstruck; The Marvels; Kaleidoscope; Big Tree
- Notable awards: Caldecott Medal (2008); Inkpot Award (2017)

Brian Selznick (born July 14, 1966) is an American illustrator and author best known as the writer of The Invention of Hugo Cabret (2007), Wonderstruck (2011), The Marvels (2015), Kaleidoscope (2021) and Big Tree (2023). He won the 2008 Caldecott Medal for U.S. picture book illustration recognizing The Invention of Hugo Cabret. He is also known for illustrating children's books such as the covers of Scholastic's 20th-anniversary editions of the Harry Potter series.

== Life and career ==
Selznick, the oldest of three children of a Jewish family, was born and grew up in East Brunswick, New Jersey, where he graduated in 1984 from East Brunswick High School. He is the son of Lynn (Samson) and Roger E. Selznick. His grandfather was a cousin of Hollywood producer David O. Selznick. He graduated from the Rhode Island School of Design and then worked for three years at Eeyore's Books for Children in Manhattan while working on The Houdini Box, about a boy's chance encounter with Harry Houdini and its aftermath. It became his debut work, a 56-page picture book published by Alfred A. Knopf in 1991.

Selznick won the 2008 Caldecott Medal from the American Library Association for the year's best-illustrated picture book, recognizing The Invention of Hugo Cabret. Its Caldecott Medal was the first for a long book, 533 pages with 284 pictures. Selznick calls it "not exactly a novel, not quite a picture book, not really a graphic novel, or a flip book or a movie, but a combination of all these things." At the time it was "by far the longest and most involved book I’ve ever worked on." It has inspired students to action, including a fourth-grade class that staged a silent film festival and a group of fifth graders who turned the book into a 30-minute modern dance.

The Invention of Hugo Cabret follows a young orphan in Paris in the 1930s as he tries to piece together a broken automaton. The book was inspired by a passage in the book Edison’s Eve by Gaby Wood recounting the collection of automata that belonged to Georges Méliès. After his death they were thrown away by the museum that he donated them to. Selznick, a fan of Méliès and automata, envisioned a young boy stealing an automaton from the garbage. The Invention of Hugo Cabret was adapted as a film, Hugo, by director Martin Scorsese and released in November 2011.

Selznick cites Maurice Sendak, author of Where the Wild Things Are, and Remy Charlip, author of Fortunately, as strong influences on his books The Invention of Hugo Cabret and Wonderstruck.

Before winning the 2008 Caldecott Medal, Selznick had been a runner-up for the award, winning a Caldecott Honor in 2002 for The Dinosaurs of Waterhouse Hawkins: An Illuminating History of Mr. Waterhouse Hawkins, Artist and Lecturer. Other awards include the Texas Bluebonnet Award, the Rhode Island Children's Book Award, and the Christopher Award. In 2025, Selznick was appointed the jury of the Progressive Cinema Competition at the 20th Rome Film Festival.

== Works ==
=== As writer ===
- "A Buried History of Paleontology", by Selznick and David Serlin, Cabinet 28: Bones (Winter 2007/08)
- The Hugo Movie Companion: A Behind the Scenes Look at How a Beloved Book Became a Major Motion Picture; with additional material by Martin Scorsese and David Serlin (Scholastic, 2011)
- The Wonderstruck Movie Scrapbook (Scholastic, 2017)

=== As writer and illustrator ===
- The Houdini Box (1991)
- The Robot King (1995)
- Boy of a Thousand Faces (2000)
- The Invention of Hugo Cabret (2007), historical steampunk novel
- Wonderstruck (2011), a historical novel
- The Marvels (2015)
- Baby Monkey, Private Eye (2018), early reader by Brian Selznick and David Serlin
- Kaleidoscope (2021)
- Big Tree (2023)
- Run Away with Me (2025)

=== As illustrator ===
- Doll Face Has a Party (1994), picture book by Pam Conrad
- Our House: stories of Levittown (1995), by Pam Conrad—about Levittown
- Frindle (1996), novella by Andrew Clements
- The Boy Who Longed for a Lift (1997), picture book by Norma Farber
- Riding Freedom (1998), by Pam Muñoz Ryand—about Charley Parkhurst, fictionalized
- Amelia and Eleanor Go for a Ride: Based on a True Story (1999), by Pam Muñoz Ryand—about Amelia Earhart; fictionalized
- Barnyard Prayers (2000), picture book by Laura Godwin
- The Doll People (2000), novel by Ann M. Martin and Laura Godwin
- The Landry News (2000, paperback), novella by Andrew Clements (1999)
- The Dinosaurs of Waterhouse Hawkins (2001), by Barbara Kerleyd—about Benjamin Waterhouse Hawkins
- The School Story (2001), by Andrew Clements
- When Marian Sang (2002), by Pam Muñoz Ryand—about Marian Anderson
- Wingwalker (2002), by Rosemary Wells
- The Dulcimer Boy (2003), novel by Tor Seidler
- The Meanest Doll in the World (2003), by Martin and Godwin, book 2
- Walt Whitman: Words for America (2004), by Barbara Kerley—about Walt Whitman
- Lunch Money (2005), novel by Andrew Clements
- Marly's Ghost: A Remix of Charles Dickens's A Christmas Carol (2006), by David Levithan
- The Runaway Dolls (2008), by Martin and Godwin, book 3
- 12: A Novel (2009, Feiwel and Friends; ISBN 9780312370213; also Twelve)
- Live Oak, with Moss (2019)
- The Frindle Files (2025), by Andrew Clements, sequel to Frindle
