= James Riley (writer) =

American novelist

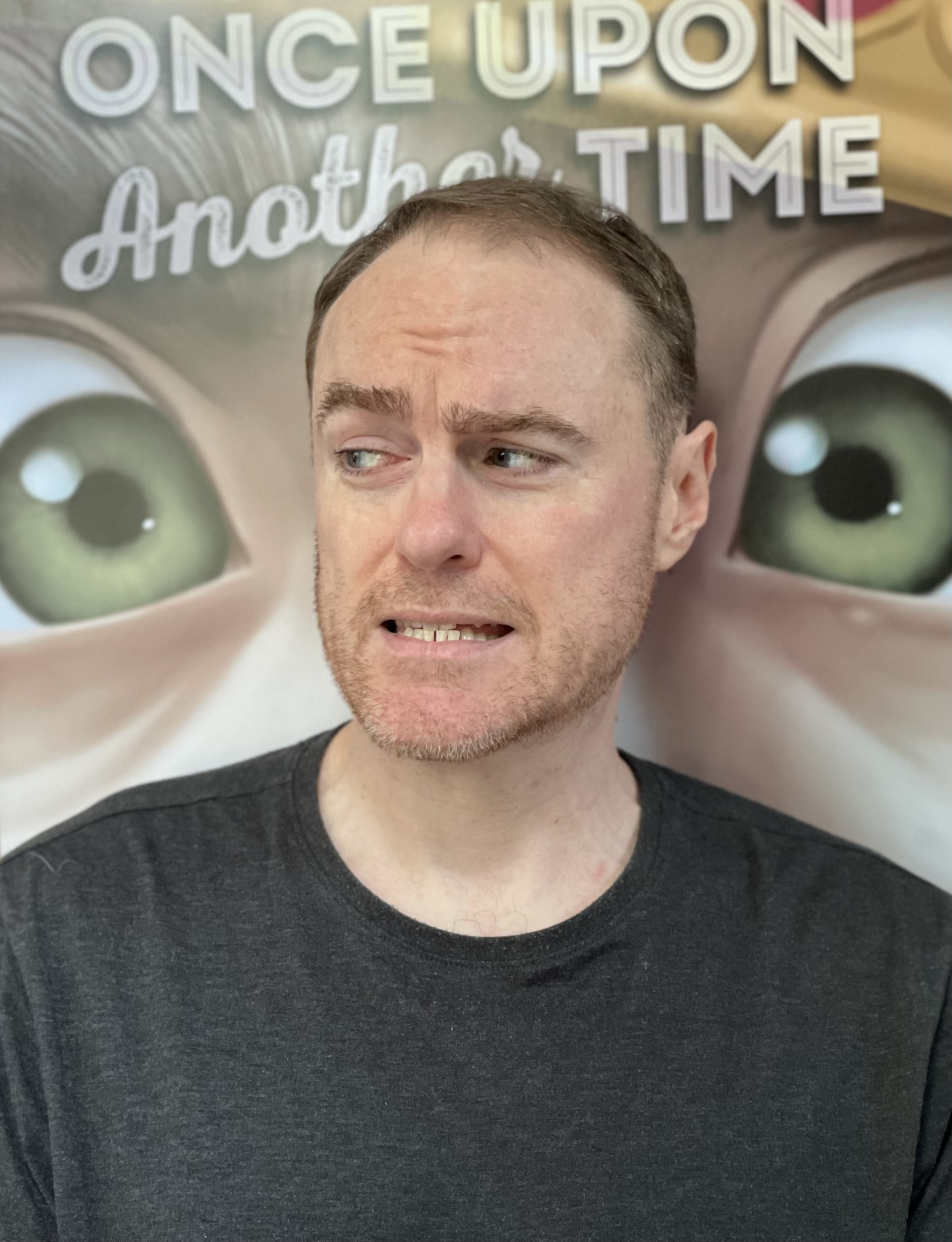
- Riley in front of a poster of his cover to ONCE UPON ANOTHER TIME in 2022.
- Born: May 9, 1977 (age 49); Connecticut
- Education: Georgetown University
- Occupation: Writer
- Writing career
- Language: English
- Years active: 2010–present
- Genre: Fantasy
- Notable work: Story Thieves
- Website: jamesrileyauthor.com

James Michael Riley (born May 9, 1977) is an American novelist, most famous for the fantasy series Story Thieves. He has also written the Half Upon a Time, Revenge of Magic, Once Upon Another Time, and The Dragon's Apprentice series.

== Writing career ==
=== Half Upon a Time trilogy ===
James Riley's first published novel, Half Upon a Time, was released on September 7, 2010, and published by Aladdin, an imprint of Simon & Schuster. It is a fantasy novel centered around a boy named Jack, the fictional son of the main character from the children's story Jack and the Beanstalk, and a girl named May who is from our nonfictional world. The novel incorporates plot points from various Brothers Grimm fairy tales, including Little Red Riding Hood, Sleeping Beauty, and Snow White.

The two other books in the trilogy, Twice Upon a Time (published April 24, 2012) and Once Upon the End (published May 7, 2013), expand upon May and Jack's adventures as they seek to thwart the main antagonist, known as the Wicked Queen.

Half Upon a Time was included on the 2014–2015 Sunshine State Young Readers Award Middle School Master List, was a Mark Twain Readers Award finalist, and was listed as a NCTE/CLA Notable Children's Book in the English Language Arts. Once Upon the End was included on the MSTA Reading Circle List.

In 2022, He published a spinoff of Half Upon a Time called Once Upon Another Time.

=== Story Thieves series ===
James Riley launched his second series with the release of the novel Story Thieves on January 20, 2015. The meta novel centers around Owen, a nonfictional boy from our world, and Bethany, a half-fictional girl. The duo works to stop a fictional wizard named the Magister from the Kiel Gnomenfoot series (a parody of Dumbledore from the Harry Potter series), as he angrily reacts to the realization that he is a fictional character.

James Riley covers a number of different genres in the Story Thieves series. Story Thieves: The Stolen Chapters (published January 19, 2016) is a mystery novel. Story Thieves: Secret Origins (published January 17, 2017) is a superhero novel with occasional comic book-style pages. Story Thieves: Pick the Plot (published September 26, 2017) is James Riley's first interactive book. The final book in the series, Story Thieves: Worlds Apart (published March 20, 2018) returns to the original Story Thieves' fantasy genre, and sees Owen and Bethany work to foil the ambitions of the main antagonist, Nobody.

Story Thieves appeared on The New York Times Best Seller list for twenty-three weeks, as well as on the Publishers Weekly bestsellers list.

=== The Revenge of Magic series ===
The Revenge of Magic, the first book in Riley's third series, was released on March 5, 2019. Shortly after an attack on Washington, D.C., by magical giants and his father's resulting death, Fort Fitzgerald is recruited to a government-run school for magic. Here, Fort encounters an "Old One", an otherworldly being. Fort and other children from the school eventually use magic to banish the Old One before it can summon others of its race to their reality.

Later books in the series include The Revenge of Magic: The Last Dragon, published on October 8, 2019, The Revenge of Magic: The Future King, published on March 3, 2020, The Revenge of Magic: The Timeless One, published on October 3, 2020, and The Revenge of Magic: The Chosen One, published on March 2, 2021. As with the Story Thieves series, the cover art for the Revenge of Magic series is by Vivienne To.

The film rights for The Revenge of Magic were acquired by Greg Silverman's Stampede Ventures, an independent film company, in August 2018.

=== Once Upon Another Time trilogy ===
Once Upon Another Time, the first book in James Riley's fourth series was released in 2022. It serves as a spinoff for Half Upon a Time.

Later books include Tall Tales (2022) and Happily Ever After (2023). The cover art for Once Upon Another Time is by Vivienne To.

=== The Dragon's Apprentice series ===
James Riley's The Dragon's Apprentice series was published by Labyrinth Road, an imprint of Random House Children's Books, division of Penguin Random House Publishing on April 1, 2025. The Dragon's Apprentice follows twelve-year-old Ciara in the town of Skael, where magic has been forbidden by the Emperor throughout the Draconic Empire. Ciara accidentally summons a dragon named Scorch, who mentors Ciara and helps her try to rescue her mother and liberate her village from the Emperor.

The second book in the series, The Dragon's Apprentice: Revenants Return, was published on February 3, 2026. Revenants Return continues with Ciara's tale, with her summoning the world-ending Revenants, while dealing with Prince Aiden from the Empire.

A third book was released on November 3, 2026, titled The Dragon's Apprentice: Destroyer of Magic. The Emperor has taken Scorch and separated the dragon from Ciara, but Prince Aiden is working with her to locate the dragon and overthrow the Emperor.
