= Canterwood Crest =

Series of novels by Jessica Burkhart

- Cover of Take the Reins, the first novel in the series
- Take the Reins; Chasing Blue; Behind the Bit; Triple Fault; Best Enemies; Little White Lies; Rival Revenge; Home Sweet Drama; City Secrets; Elite Ambition; Scandals, Rumors, Lies; Unfriendly Competition; Chosen (Super Special); Initiation; Popular; Comeback; Masquerade; Jealousy; Famous; Home for Christmas (Super Special)
- Author: Jessica Burkhart
- Original title: Sasha Silver
- Cover artist: Monica Stevenson
- Country: United States
- Language: English
- Publisher: Simon & Schuster
- Published: January 27, 2009

Canterwood Crest is a series of novels by Jessica Burkhart. The series follows middle school students at Canterwood Crest Academy, an elite boarding school for highly competitive equestrian riders. It begins by following Sasha Silver, a transfer student at Canterwood Crest. While attending Canterwood, Sasha encounters a disparate collection of students, including snobbish alpha rider Heather Fox and her eventual love interest Jacob. Throughout the series, the team members work together amidst a slew of personality clashes and romantic conflicts. In later books, the series switches focus to new characters Drew Adams and Lauren Towers.

== Overview ==
Former Connecticut student Sasha Silver plans to join the school's equestrian team, but she is met with resistance from three popular members known as the Trio (Heather, Julia, and Alison), who view her as a threat to their social status. The initial focus is on Sasha's efforts to make the team and sustain her morale and good academics. Jacob begins to earn Sasha's romantic attention, which eventually begins a conflict with her best friend Callie. Throughout the series, other romantic interests also enter the story, leading to love triangles and other personal matters.

== Background ==
Burkhart was inspired by a combination of equestrian experience during her youth and a fondness for writing as she grew older. After much of her freelance work was published in magazines, she entered the 2006 National Novel Writing Month competition and completed a first draft of Take the Reins. In January 2007, a literary agent offered to read the story after viewing the author's blog. Burkhart was later signed by the agent, which eventually led to a four-book deal with Simon & Schuster.

While promoting the first novel, Burkhart maintained an online presence throughout 2008, blogging and vlogging about the production of her work and the publishing process. In April, the author reported that photoshoots for her covers had been set in motion. By September, Burkhart had received an advance reader copy of Take the Reins while working on the subsequent novels.

== Characters ==
Sasha Silver is the first protagonist of the series. She owns a horse named Charm and is roommates with a girl named Paige. Sasha and Callie become best friends from the start. Eventually, Sasha meets Jacob. In Chasing Blue, Heather breaks up Sasha and Jacob. Sasha makes the Youth Equestrian National Team (YENT). Towards the end of City Secrets, Sasha meets Jacob and decides to start dating again.

Callie Harper is Sasha's best friend. Before Callie started at Canterwood, she rode for the elite New England Saddle Club. She has a black Morab gelding horse named Black Jack. Later in the series, Sasha and Callie end their friendship. Callie ends up missing out on a spot on the YENT at first because of Jacob, with whom she had a relationship. Callie and Sasha eventually become best friends again.

Heather Fox is the leader of the clique called the Trio, and a fellow student at Canterwood Crest with the reputation of being a mean girl. She hates Sasha at first, and plots to break her and Jacob up, but gradually begins to like her. She has a dark chestnut Thoroughbred gelding called Aristocrat.

Julia Myer is the second member of the Trio. She and Alison are somewhat "sidekicks" to Heather. She has a compact bay mare named Trix. Julia gets expelled from Canterwood Crest after creating a blog in Scandals, Rumors, Lies after she was not picked for the YENT.

Alison Robb is the third member of the Trio. She is a quiet observer. She and Julia are somewhat "sidekicks" to Heather. Alison is kinder to Sasha and her friends than Julia. She has a palomino Arabian horse named Sunstruck.

Jasmine King is a mean girl from another school who Sasha and the Canterwood gang meet at a show. She takes great delight in insulting students from Canterwood Crest. She has a horse named Phoenix. She will do anything to win, even putting her horse at risk. She later transfers from Wellington Prep to Canterwood Crest and frames Allison and Julia for cheating. Jasmine talks to Sasha and tells her about how she just slipped sheets of paper in their desk so that it would look like they were cheating. Sasha catches the situation on camera and Jasmine is expelled.

Jacob Schwartz is a boy Sasha meets at Canterwood Crest. Jacob becomes Sasha's love interest. He is afraid of horses. Jacob has an on-off relationship with Sasha, but in Unfriendly Competition, he begins a permanent relationship with her.

Eric Rodriguez is a boy Sasha meets who transferred in the middle of the year. He has a relationship with Sasha, but they break up in Little White Lies after he sees Jacob kissing her in her dorm. They agree to still be friends, and later in the series, Eric helps Jacob and Sasha in their relationship. Eric is a rider but does not own a horse, only riding a school one called Luna who is flea-bitten grey.

Paige Parker is Sasha's roommate and other best friend. They both meet in Take the Reins, but Sasha moves out after a conflict between Paige and Sasha. Paige later lives in the dorm with her friend Geena from cooking class. Paige stars in a show called Teen Cuisine and she regularly bakes goodies for Sasha.

Brittany "Brit" Chan is Sasha's new roommate in Orchard Hall. who is a transfer student from a small town. She arrives in Elite Ambition and is called the new "IT" girl. She rides a leased horse called Apollo.

Lauren Towers is a student who works hard at everything. She had a jumping accident in the past. She looks up to Sasha and is best friends with Khloe, Lexa, Clare, Brielle, and Ana. She owns a young grey Hanoverian cross thoroughbred mare called Whisper.

Khloe Kinsella is Lauren's friend and roommate who is a drama queen. She loves acting and wants her name to be on the Hollywood Walk of Fame. She has long blond hair and brown eyes. She owns a bay Hanoverian mare called Ever.

Riley Edwards is the antagonist at Canterwood during the later books in the series. She and Lauren have never gotten along. Like Khloe, she loves acting. The shared love of theatre with Khloe causes some serious off-stage drama between Riley and Khloe. She owns a grey gelding called Adonis.

Taylor Frost is Lauren's ex-boyfriend from Yates Preparatory Academy in Union, Connecticut. He makes an unexpected appearance and admits to Lauren in the 18th book that he had been secretly dating Brielle the last summer Lauren was in Union, and the three eventually reconcile.

Brielle Monaco is Lauren's best friend from Yates Preparatory School, and in Union. She makes an unexpected appearance at Canterwood and admits alongside Taylor that the two dated over the summer. She rides an Albino horse named Zane.

Carina Johansson is a transfer student from Sweden who comes to train at Canterwood Crest Academy with Mr. Conner in the foreign exchange program. She rides a Canterwood School horse named Rocco.

Drew Adams is Lauren's boyfriend at Canterwood. They bond over their love of horses. Drew owns a calm-natured blood bay Arabian cross thoroughbred gelding called Polo.
