= Grimmtastic Girls =

Children's book series

Grimmtastic Girls is a series of children's books written by Joan Holub and Suzanne Williams and published between 2014 and 2016 with Scholastic Inc. The characters are based on those from nursery rhymes and fairy tales, including Grimm's Fairytales. Each book is told from the perspective of a different character, including Cinderella, Little Red Riding Hood, Rapunzel, Snow White, Sleeping Beauty, and Goldilocks. The series takes place at the boarding school Grimm Academy, located in the country of Grimmlandia, where certain girls are chosen by magic charms and must deal with middle school while thwarting the E.V.I.L. Society's plans.

== Female characters ==
=== Cinderella ===
Cinderella, nicknamed Cinda, is a new student at Grimm Academy. She is a tomboy who loves the Grimmlandian sport of masketball, is terrified of dancing, and has no interest in fashion. After her mother died, her father remarried to her stepmother, whose two children, Malorette and Odette, became her stepsisters. They wreak havoc on her life as they manipulate and blackmail others and try to frame her for their actions. In Cinderella Stays Late, she begins her first day at Grimm Academy and meets Red, Rapunzel, and Snow, as well as Prince Awesome, who she eventually falls in love with. Her fear of her stepsisters causes her to be too afraid to report suspicious behavior, and she only takes action after she learns of a dark plot involving the E.V.I.L. Society. Cinda acquires a magic pair of glass slippers as a charm, which help her dance at Prince Awesome's ball and uncover a mapestry which was hidden under the stones. In Rapunzel Cuts Loose, she and her friends use the mapestry to locate a magical treasure that is said to save Grimm Academy.

=== Rapunzel ===
Rapunzel is a goth girl who is fearless, but has severe acrophobia, which caused her to be given special permission to live in the dungeon of Pink Tower instead of the dormitories at the top. She has extremely long hair that grows continuously despite her efforts to cut it, which is implied to be because of a spell a witch cast on her. Her magical charm is an onyx carved comb that grows on her command. In Rapunzel Cuts Loose, she has a crush on Prince Perfect until she finds out he only likes her because of her hair, and later falls in love with Basil, a boy who she met in first grade and saved from a bully. She also foils the E.V.I.L. Society's plans, seals away the witch who raised her, and finds the magical treasure that can save Grimm Academy.

=== Red Riding Hood ===
Red Riding Hood, nicknamed Red, is roommates with Gretel. She loves to act, but suffers from stage fright, and is a talented baker. She has a horrible sense of direction, which often makes her late for class. Her magical charm is a brown wicker basket that can manifest anything that fits inside it at her command. In Red Riding Hood Gets Lost, Wolfgang helps her overcome her stage fright and they fall in love with each other.

=== Snow White ===
Snow White, nicknamed Snow, is the protagonist of Snow White Lucks Out. She is a shy girl who enjoys cleaning and is good at dancing and sewing like her mother. When she was a child, her mother died and her father married her stepmother, Ms. Wicked, who took her in after he died when she was six years old. After being kicked out of the castle by a distant heir, Ms. Wicked begins teaching at Grimm Academy to make a living. Snow is allergic to fruit and believes in lucky charms, and has a crush on Prince Prince, the prince of her story. Her lucky charm is a golden tiara with seven jewels; the middle jewel can make her invisible if she presses it.

=== Sleeping Beauty ===
Briar Rose, who usually goes by her middle name, Rose, is the protagonist of Sleeping Beauty Dreams Big. According to her fairy tale, after her twelfth birthday, Rose must avoid all sharp objects, which is difficult at Grimm Academy because enchanted objects can be dangerous.

=== Goldilocks ===
Goldilocks is a new student at Grimm Academy and the protagonist of Goldilocks Breaks In. She is desperate to make friends, to the point that she considering accepting an invitation to join E.V.I.L. just to be included. She ends up working as a double agent for the Grimm Organization of Defense (G.O.O.D.) to help foil the E.V.I.L. Society's plans and becomes involved in an attempted break-in past the three bear guards.

=== Snowflake ===
Snowflake is the protagonist of Snowflake Freezes Up, in which she is unsure which fairy tale character she is and spends time in the library searching for the truth. She has distanced herself from her classmates to avoid hurting them, as she fears that she could be a villain. After receiving her magic charm, a snowflake, her powers begin to cause trouble. Ultimately, she must help fight Jack Frost and determine whether Dragonbreath is good or evil.

=== Gretel ===
Gretel is the protagonist of Gretel Pushes Back and Hansel's brother, who enjoys hiking. Although she often argues with Hansel, she truly cares for him. While fighting against the E.V.I.L. Society, she finds a candy cottage in the woods.

== Male characters ==
=== Prince Awesome ===
Prince Awesome is the prince of the Kingdom of Awesomeness and the prince of Cinderella's story, who is polite and strives to do what is right. He first appears in Cinderella Stays Late, in which Principal Rumplestiltskin introduces him along with Cinda as the new kids at school and he invites everyone to his ball. He is on the masketball team and has a crush on Cinda, who later falls in love with him.

=== Wolfgang ===
Wolfgang is a loner who hangs out in the Neverwood forest and is said to have the ability to shapeshift into a wolf. He first appears in Cinderella Stays Late, but has a larger role in Red Riding Hood Gets Lost, in which he has a crush on Red. Like her, he enjoys acting and played the second lead role in the school play Peter and the Wolf and the male lead in Red Robin Hood. After deciding that he wants to be part of the E.V.I.L. Society, he spies on its members to get information, but is ultimately denied membership. His great-great-grandmother is Grandmother Enchantress, the sister of the Brothers Grimm.

=== Prince Foulsmell ===
Prince Foulsmell is a student at Grimm Academy. In an effort to fit in with the wrong crowd, Goldilocks is initially rude to him and insults him, but later befriends him as he helps her thwart the E.V.I.L Society's plans.

=== Principal Rumplestiltskin ===
Rumplestiltskin is the principal of Grimm Academy, who has a short temper and is obsessed with alchemy. He hates hearing his own name, and threatens students with various punishments merely for saying his name.

=== Jack Frost ===
Jack Frost is a villain that Snowflake fights against.

=== Dragonbreath ===
A character who appears in Snowflake Freezes Up. Snowflake must determine if he is good or evil.

=== Prince Prince ===
A character who first appears in Snow White Lucks Out. He is shown to have an interest in Snow.

=== Basil ===
A boy who Rapunzel met in first grade and saved from a bully, who she later falls in love with.

== Books ==
- Cinderella Stays Late
- Red Riding Hood Gets Lost
- Snow White Lucks Out
- Rapunzel Cuts Loose
- Sleeping Beauty Dreams Big
- Goldilocks Breaks In
- Snowflake Freezes Up
- Gretel Pushes Back
