= Wonderstruck (novel) =

American young-adult fiction novel

- First hardcover edition (2011)
- Author: Brian Selznick
- Language: English
- Genre: Juvenile fiction
- Publisher: Scholastic Press
- Publication date: September 13, 2011
- Publication place: United States
- Media type: Hardcover
- Pages: 637
- ISBN: 978-0-545-02789-2
- OCLC: 714505154

Wonderstruck (2011) is an American young-adult fiction novel written and illustrated by Brian Selznick, who also created The Invention of Hugo Cabret (2007). In Wonderstruck, Selznick continued the narrative approach of his last book, using both words and illustrations — though in this book he separates the illustrations and the writings into their own story and weaves them together at the end.

== Plot ==
=== Ben ===
Ben’s story starts in Gunflint Lake, Minnesota in June 1977. He was born deaf in his left ear. Ben’s mom, Elaine, the town librarian, died in a car crash. He now lives with his aunt and uncle 83 steps from the house in which he grew up. Ben never knew his dad but feels a pull to find out who he was. Ben discovers a bookmark in his mother's book, Wonderstruck, inscribed to his mother that ends with the words "Love, Danny." Ben thinks Danny must have been his father and proceeds to call the number listed on the bookmark. As he is calling, a bolt of lightning strikes his house, travels through the phone line, and causes him to lose his remaining hearing. He wakes up in the hospital, unaware of where he is. A short time later, he runs away from the hospital and journeys to New York City, eventually hiding out in the American Museum of Natural History. While at the museum, he meets Jamie, whose father works at the museum. Jamie takes him on tours of the back areas of the museum and helps him to hide in an unused storage room. Ben is still determined to track down his father, so he leaves the museum to locate the bookstore listed on the bookmark he found in his mother's book that was written by his father. Once there, he encounters Rose and they try to piece together how they might be connected.

=== Rose ===
Rose's story starts in Hoboken, New Jersey in October 1927. She is kept at home, with visits from a tutor, because she is deaf. Unhappy and lonely at home, she runs away to New York City to see actress Lillian Mayhew. In New York, Rose travels to the theater where Lillian Mayhew is performing. She sneaks in, and is found by the actress herself, who we learn is Rose's mother. Mayhew is furious, despite Rose telling her that she came on her own. Mayhew intends to send Rose back to her father, so she locks Rose in her dressing room. Rose escapes and flees to the American Museum of Natural History. She is found there by her brother, Walter. He takes her back to his apartment and promises to speak to their parents. She then finds Ben and the stories connect. Rose is Ben's grandmother.

=== 1977 ===
In 1977, we see a mature Rose entering a bookstore where she meets Ben. Rose is Ben's grandmother, and Danny was both Rose's son and Ben's father. Rose takes Ben to Queens, and leads him into the Queens Museum of Art where she tells her story. She tells Ben how Danny met Ben's mother, and how he died from heart failure. Rose then shows Ben an extremely detailed miniature New York City that she hand-made for the World's Fair in New York, in 1964.

The book ends with the 1977 blackout. Ben and Rose look at the stars while waiting for Walter to pick them up.

== Conception ==
Brian Selznick's previous work The Invention of Hugo Cabret (2008) combined words and illustrations in its storytelling. Selznick sought to take the narrative approach further in alternating between two different stories, one in words and one in illustrations, before weaving them together at the end. USA Today wrote, "Wonderstruck is told in blocks of detailed pencil drawings, most of them wordless, like scenes from a silent movie, that alternate with pages of text."

Through Deaf Eyes, a PBS documentary about deafness and Deaf culture, gave Selznick the idea for Wonderstruck. He learned from a deaf educator in the documentary that deaf people are "hyper-attuned... to the visual world". The detail led Selznick to illustrate a story about a deaf character, "We experience [Rose's] story in a way that perhaps might echo the way she experiences her own life." Selznick's partner David Serlin worked at University of California, San Diego and knew Deaf scholars Carol Padden and Tom L. Humphries, who helped Selznick understand how to write his characters.

== Publication ==
USA Today wrote of Wonderstruck being published, "At 639 pages — more than 100 pages longer than Hugo— his new novel is one of the biggest (in size and anticipation) kids' books of the fall." The Atlantic said Wonderstruck was "much-anticipated".

== Reception ==
Mary Quattlebaum of The Washington Post called Wonderstruck a "superb illustrated novel" that was "even more brilliantly executed" than Selznick's previous work, The Invention of Hugo Cabret (2007). She said of Wonderstruck, "Selznick deftly builds a sense of continuity and suspense by juxtaposing words against pictures and vice versa," and she found that the "two stories intersect in a poignant climax that will be deeply satisfying to readers". Chicago Tribune's Mary Harris Russell called the book "a grand treasure map adventure with storms, stars and secrets; it rewards the engaged reader with a landscape of wonder".

Adam Gopnik, writing in The New York Times Book Review, said Wonderstruck was "engrossing, intelligent, beautifully engineered and expertly told both in word and image". While Gopnik found that "there is so much to like and admire", he said, "The hero, Ben, seems rather routinely imagined: one of those isolated Fine Boys with a Disability who are the default heroes of too many children's books. The heroes and heroines of imaginative literature need not be tragically flawed, but they ought to be tarter, more capable of imperfection, than this. Even Ben's deafness seems oddly un-disabling." Gopnik said "the concern with the deaf 'issues' that fill the book... feels at times too appropriate—uncomfortably pious, a medicinal outgrowth of the fable rather than essential to its magic." The reviewer said that these doubts "are overcome, overwhelmed even, by the purity of Selznick's imagination". Gopnik concluded, "So, while the ostensible moral of 'Wonderstruck' is the entanglement of people, its real lesson is about memory. Beyond its honorable message about the dignity of deafness, it teaches a respect for the past and for the power of memory to make minds."

In an article for The Guardian, the illustrator Chris Riddell commended Selznick's illustrations as a cross between L. S. Lowry and Maurice Sendak, calling it "a mixture of the touchingly naive and the closely observed, rendered in luminous pencil shading". Riddell said, "It is ideal for the novel's frequent twists and turns and the numerous lyrical high points which culminate in the cinematic close ups of which Selznick is so fond. By comparison with the flowing visual sequences, the writing feels a little flat." The reviewer concluded, "The two stories come together at the climax of the book, which manages to incorporate an impressive array of heartfelt issues: everything from education for the deaf to friendship, love of collecting, conservation, memories and dioramas. As I turned the pages my heart was well and truly warmed in that way beloved of a certain type of American children's literature – earnest, life affirming, educational, and impossible to dislike."

== Film adaptation ==
When Wonderstruck was published in September 2011, Selznick said there was interest in creating a film adaptation, like one had been created for his previous book Hugo. The novel was adapted into a film by director Todd Haynes, who filmed based on a screenplay written by Selznick himself. Julianne Moore stars in the film. It was released on October 20, 2017.
