= California Young Reader Medal =

Annual literary awards

The California Young Reader Medal is a set of five annual literary awards conferred upon picture books and fiction books selected by vote of California schoolchildren from a ballot prepared by committee. The program was established in 1974 with Intermediate, Primary, and Young Adult Medals that were inaugurated in 1975, 1976, and 1977 and were conferred biennially, and annually beginning in 1983. (Note: The Middle School/Junior High Medal was added in 1980 and all four became annual in 1983. The fifth award category, Picture Books for Older Readers, was inaugurated in 2002. ("Nominees and Winners List" at google.docs))

The program is intended to encourage recreational reading and is sponsored by four organizations that promote reading and literacy: the California Association of Teachers of English, the California Library Association, the California Reading Association, and the California School Library Association.

There are five medals, last modified for 2002: Primary (grades K-3), Intermediate (grades 3–6), Middle School/Junior High (grades 6–9), Young Adult (grades 9–12), and Picture Books for Older Readers (grades 4 and up)—that is, roughly age 10 and up. (Note: US school children commonly turn six years old during kindergarten (K), nine years old in grade 3, and so on.) Both writer and illustrator receive the Primary and Picture Book Medals, where applicable.

The ballot for each medal comprises 3–5 books published during the preceding four years—two to five years ago when the process concludes. For example, 17 books published from 2010 to 2013 were nominated for 2014–2015.

== Rules and process ==
Young readers, their parents, educators, librarians, and "anyone who works with young people" may recommend books. Candidates must be original works of fiction by living authors, available in English, published during the four preceding years and still in print.

Nominations are made by award category and the books should be "often read or requested" and have "strong appeal for the age group". A committee of the sponsoring organizations selects "a well-balanced list of nominees" (finalists), considering merit and appeal.

Children may vote in all categories where they know all of the candidates by reading or hearing read aloud. They cast a combined paper ballot at once, in a classroom or library monitored by an adult. (Note: Presumably children may cast ballots at school and once for each public library or after-school program they join. ("Vote" at CYRM))

== Winners ==
The medals in four categories inaugurated in 1975, 1976, 1977, and 1980 were biennial until 1983, and thereafter annual. For each category (now five) CYRM maintains a "Booklist" of finalists (3–5 annually) that provides basic bibliographic data for all, and cover images beginning in 2005 or so.

=== 1970s ===
California Young Reader Medal winners, 1975–1979
Year	Category	Author	Title
1975	Intermediate	Thomas Rockwell	How to Eat Fried Worms
1976	Primary	Bill Peet	How Droofus the Dragon Lost His Head
1977	Intermediate	Mary Rodgers	Freaky Friday
1977	Young Adult	Richard Adams	Watership Down
1978	Primary	Lucy Bate, illus. by Diane de Groat	Little Rabbit's Loose Tooth
1979	Intermediate	Roald Dahl	Danny, the Champion of the World
1979	Young Adult	Sandra Scoppettone	The Late Great Me

=== 1980s ===
California Young Reader Medal winners, 1980–1989
Year	Category	Author	Title
1980	Middle School/Junior High	Betsy Byars	The Pinballs
1980	Primary	Bill Peet	Big Bad Bruce
1981	Intermediate	Wilson Rawls	Summer of the Monkeys
1981	Young Adult	Lois Lowry	A Summer to Die
1982	Primary	Harry Allard, illus. by James Marshall	Miss Nelson is Missing
1982	Middle School/Junior High	Ellen Conford	Hail, Hail Camp Timberwood
1983	Primary	Mercer Mayer	Liza Lou and the Yeller Belly Swamp
1983	Intermediate	Judy Blume	Superfudge
1983	Middle School/Junior High	Judy Blume	Tiger Eyes
1983	Young Adult	Lois Duncan	Summer of Fear
1984	Primary	Phyllis Green, illus. by Joel Schick	Bagdad Ate It
1984	Intermediate	Theodore Taylor	The Trouble with Tuck
1984	Middle School/Junior High	Paula Danziger	There's a Bat in Bunk Five
1984	Young Adult	Lois Duncan	Stranger with My Face
1985	Primary	Carol Chapman, illus. by Kelly Oechsli	Herbie's Troubles
1985	Intermediate	Lynne Reid Banks	The Indian in the Cupboard
1985	Middle School/Junior High	Norma Fox Mazer	Taking Terri Mueller
1985	Young Adult	Frances Miller	The Truth Trap
1986	Primary	Edward Marshall, illus. by James Marshall	Space Case
1986	Intermediate	Barthe DeClements	Nothing's Fair in Fifth Grade
1986	Middle School/Junior High	Willo Davis Roberts	Girl with the Silver Eyes
1986	Young Adult	Meredith Pierce	The Darkangel
1987 (Note: Beginning in 1987, the illustrators of Primary Award-winning books have officially received full recognition alongside the writers.)	Primary	Audrey Wood, illus. by Don Wood	The Napping House
1987	Intermediate	Betty Ren Wright	The Dollhouse Murders
1987	Middle School/Junior High	Patricia Hermes	You Shouldn't Have to Say Goodbye
1987	Young Adult	Michael French	Pursuit
1988	Primary	Laura Joffe Numeroff, illus. by Felicia Bond	If You Give a Mouse a Cookie
1988	Intermediate	Stephen Manes	Be a Perfect Person in Just Three Days
1988	Middle School/Junior High	Janet Lunn	The Root Cellar
1988	Young Adult	William Sleator	Interstellar Pig
1989	Primary	Carol Carrick, illus. by Donald Carrick	What Happened to Patrick's Dinosaurs?
1989	Intermediate	Elizabeth Winthrop	The Castle in the Attic
1989	Middle School/Junior High	Joan Lowery Nixon	The Stalker
1989	Young Adult	Eve Bunting	The Face at the Edge of the World

=== 1990s ===
California Young Reader Medal winners, 1990–1999
Year	Category	Author	Title
1990	Primary	Margaret Leaf, illus. by Ed Young	Eyes of the Dragon
1990	Intermediate	Robert Kimmel Smith	The War with Grandpa
1990	Middle School/Junior High	Joan Lowery Nixon	The Other Side of Dark
1990	Young Adult	Cynthia Voigt	Izzy, Willy Nilly
1991	Primary	Helen Lester, illus. by Lynn M. Munsinger	Tacky the Penguin
1991	Intermediate	Dick King-Smith	Harry's Mad
1991	Middle School/Junior High	Mary Downing Hahn	December Stillness
1991	Young Adult	M.E. Kerr	Night Kites
1992	Primary	Denys Cazet	Never Spit on Your Shoes
1992	Intermediate	Lois Lowry	All About Sam
1992	Middle School/Junior High	Theodore Taylor	Sniper
1992	Young Adult	Eve Bunting	A Sudden Silence
1993	Primary	Kevin Henkes	Julius, the Baby of the World
1993	Intermediate	Judy Blume	Fudge-a-Mania
1993	Middle School/Junior High	Avi	Something Upstairs
1993	Young Adult	Annette Curtis Klause	The Silver Kiss
1994	Primary	Mary Calhoun, illus. by Erick Ingraham	High-Wire Henry
1994	Intermediate	Willo Davis Roberts	Scared Stiff
1994	Middle School/Junior High	Jerry Spinelli	There's a Girl in My Hammerlock
1994	Young Adult	Robert Cormier	We All Fall Down
1995	Primary	Susan Meddaugh	Martha Speaks
1995	Intermediate	Pam Conrad	Stonewords
1995	Middle School/Junior High	Ben Mikaelsen	Rescue Josh McGuire
1995	Young Adult	Will Hobbs	Downriver
1996	Primary	Janell Cannon	Stellaluna
1996	Intermediate	Mary Downing Hahn	Time for Andrew
1996	Middle School/Junior High	Rodman Philbrick	Freak the Mighty
1996	Young Adult	Sherry Garland	Shadow of the Dragon
1997	Primary	Erica Silverman, illus. by S. D. Schindler	Don't Fidget a Feather!
1997	Intermediate	Bruce Coville	Jennifer Murdley's Toad
1997	Middle School/Junior High	Ben Mikaelsen	Sparrow Hawk Red
1997	Young Adult	Chris Crutcher	Staying Fat for Sarah Byrnes
1998	Primary	Dav Pilkey	Dog Breath
1998	Intermediate	Erika Tamar	The Junkyard Dog
1998	Middle School/Junior High	Christopher Paul Curtis	The Watsons Go to Birmingham – 1963
1998	Young Adult	Chris Crutcher	Ironman
1999	Primary	Pamela Duncan Edwards, illus. by Henry Cole	Livingstone Mouse
1999	Intermediate	Sid Fleischman, illus. by Peter Sis	The 13th Floor
1999	Middle School/Junior High	Graham Salisbury	Under the Blood Red Sun
1999	Young Adult	Kristen Randle	The Only Alien on the Planet

=== 2000s ===
California Young Reader Medal winners, 2000–2009
Year	Category	Author	Title
2000	Primary	Paul Brett Johnson and Celeste Lewis, illus. by Johnson	Lost
2000	Intermediate	Pam Muñoz Ryan	Riding Freedom
2000	Middle School/Junior High	Gail Carson Levine	Ella Enchanted
2000	Young Adult	A. M. Jenkins	Breaking Bones
2001	Primary	Rod Clement	Grandpa's Teeth
2001	Intermediate	Dan Gutman	Honus & Me
2001	Middle School/Junior High	Margaret Peterson Haddix	Among the Hidden
2001	Young Adult	Jane Yolen and Bruce Coville	Armageddon Summer
2002	Primary	Helen Lester, illus. by Lynn M. Munsinger	Hooway for Wodney Wat
2002	Intermediate	Dan Gutman	The Million Dollar Shot
2002	Middle School/Junior High	Jack Gantos	Joey Pigza Swallowed the Key
2002	Picture Books for Older Readers	Paul Fleischman	Weslandia
2002	Young Adult	Jean Ferris	Bad
2003	Primary	Lauren Child	I Will Never, Not Ever, Eat a Tomato
2003	Intermediate	Kate DiCamillo	Because of Winn-Dixie
2003	Middle School/Junior High	Ben Mikaelsen	Touching Spirit Bear
2003	Picture Books for Older Readers	David A. Adler	The Babe and I
2003	Young Adult	Julie Anne Peters	Define Normal
2004	Primary	Sharon Creech, illus. by Harry Bliss	A Fine, Fine School
2004	Intermediate	Andrew Clements	The School Story
2004	Middle School/Junior High	Wendelin Van Draanen	Flipped
2004	Picture Books for Older Readers	Janet Stevens	And the Dish Ran Away with the Spoon
2004	Young Adult	Lensey Namioka	Ties that Bind, Ties that Break
2005	Primary	Candace Fleming, illus. by G. Brian Karas	Muncha! Muncha! Muncha!
2005	Intermediate	Sharon Creech	Ruby Holler
2005	Middle School/Junior High	Andrew Clements	Things Not Seen
2005	Picture Books for Older Readers	Patricia Polacco	Mr. Lincoln's Way
2005	Young Adult	Anthony Horowitz	Stormbreaker
2006	Primary	Michael Garland	Miss Smith's Incredible Storybook
2006	Intermediate	Avi	The Good Dog
2006	Middle School/Junior High	Sue Corbett	12 Again
2006	Picture Books for Older Readers	Candace Fleming, illus. by Stacey Dressen-McQueen	Boxes for Katje
2006	Young Adult	Francine Prose	After
2007	Primary	Keiko Kasza	My Lucky Day
2007	Intermediate	William Wise	Christopher Mouse
2007	Middle School/Junior High	Gennifer Choldenko	Al Capone Does My Shirts
2007	Picture Books for Older Readers	Karen Hesse, illus. by Wendy Watson	The Cats in Krasinski Square
2007	Young Adult	Gail Giles	Shattering Glass
2008	Primary	Caralyn Buehner, illus. by Mark Buehner	Superdog: The Heart of a Hero
2008	Intermediate	Deborah Wiles	Each Little Bird That Sings
2008	Middle School/Junior High	Neal Shusterman	The Schwa Was Here
2008	Picture Books for Older Readers	Frank Asch, illus. by Devin Asch	Mr. Maxwell's Mouse
2008	Young Adult	Michael Morpurgo	Private Peaceful
2009	Primary	Linda Bailey, illus. by Bill Slavin	Stanley's Wild Ride
2009	Intermediate	Valerie Hobbs	Sheep
2009	Middle School/Junior High	Mike Lupica	Heat
2009	Picture Books for Older Readers	Doug Cushman	Mystery at the Club Sandwich
2009	Young Adult	Patricia McCormick	Sold

=== 2010s ===
California Young Reader Medal winners, 2010–2019
Year	Category	Author	Title
2010	Primary	Alexander Steffensmeier	Millie Waits for the Mail
2010	Intermediate	Andrew Clements	No Talking
2010	Middle School/Junior High	Watt Key	Alabama Moon
2010	Picture Books for Older Readers	Mona Kerby, illus. by Lynne Barasch	Owney: The Mail-Pouch Pooch
2010	Young Adult	Sherman Alexie	The Absolutely True Diary of a Part-Time Indian
2011	Primary	Carmen Agra Deedy, illus. by Michael Austin	Martina the Beautiful Cockroach
2011	Intermediate	Robert Paul Weston	Zorgamazoo
2011	Middle School/Junior High	Cynthia Kadohata	Cracker: The Best Dog in Vietnam
2011	Picture Books for Older Readers	Lane Smith	John, Paul, George & Ben
2011	Young Adult	Suzanne Collins	The Hunger Games
2012	Primary	Amanda Noll, illus. by Howard McWilliam	I Need My Monster
2012	Intermediate	Danette Haworth	Violet Raines Almost Got Struck by Lightning
2012	Middle School/Junior High	Wendy Mass	Every Soul a Star
2012	Picture Books for Older Readers	Ellen Levine, illus. by Kadir Nelson	Henry's Freedom Box
2012	Young Adult	Kristin Cashore	Graceling
2013	Primary	Mo Willems	We Are in a Book!
2013	Intermediate	Iain Lawrence	The Giant Slayer
2013	Middle School/Junior High	Sharon Draper	Out of My Mind
2013	Picture Books for Older Readers	Major Brian Dennis, Kirby Larson, and Mary Nethery, illus. and photos from members of the Marines team	Nubs: The True Story of a Mutt, a Marine and a Miracle
2013	Young Adult	Ally Condie	Matched
2014	Primary	Herve Tullet	Press Here
2014	Intermediate	Lisa McMann	The Unwanteds
2014	Middle School/Junior High	Brian Selznick	Wonderstruck
2014	Picture Books for Older Readers	Chris Van Allsburg	Queen of the Falls
2014	Young Adult	Veronica Roth	Divergent
2015	Primary	Amy Krouse Rosenthal, illus. by Tom Lichtenheld	Exclamation Mark
2015	Intermediate	R. J. Palacio	Wonder
2015	Middle School/Junior High	Jennifer A. Nielsen	The False Prince
2015	Picture Books for Older Readers	Audrey Vernick, illus. by Steven Salerno	Brothers at Bat: The True Story of an Amazing All-Brother Team
2015	Young Adult	John Green	The Fault in Our Stars
2016	Primary	Drew Daywalt, illus. by Oliver Jeffers	The Day the Crayons Quit
2016	Intermediate	Sarah Lean	A Dog Called Homeless
2016	Middle School/Junior High	Elizabeth Partridge	Dogtag Summer
2016	Picture Books for Older Readers	Doreen Rappaport, illus. by Matt Tavares	Helen's Big World: The Life of Helen Keller
2016	Young Adult	Marissa Meyer	Cinder
2017	Primary	Mac Barnett, illus. by Jon Klassen	Sam & Dave Dig a Hole
2017	Intermediate	Chris Grabenstein	Escape from Mr. Lemoncello's Library
2017	Middle School/Junior High	Shannon Messenger	Keeper of the Lost Cities
2017	Picture Books for Older Readers	Jacqueline Woodson, illus. by E. B. Lewis	Each Kindness
2017	Young Adult	Victoria Aveyard	Red Queen
2018	Primary	B. J. Novak	The Book with No Pictures
2018	Intermediate	Sara Pennypacker, illus. by Jon Klassen	Pax
2018	Middle School/Junior High	Jennifer A. Nielsen	A Night Divided
2018	Picture Books for Older Readers	Marissa Moss, illus. by Yuko Shimizu	Barbed Wire Baseball
2018	Young Adult	Ruta Sepetys	Salt to the Sea
2019	Primary	David Litchfield	The Bear and the Piano
2019	Intermediate	Kimberly Brubaker Bradley	The War That Saved My Life
2019	Middle School/Junior High	Pam Muñoz Ryan	Echo
2019	Picture Books for Older Readers	Laurie Ann Thompson, illus. by Sean Qualls	Emmanuel's Dream: The True Story of Emmanuel Ofosu Yeboah
2019	Young Adult	Aisha Saeed	Written in the Stars

=== 2020s ===
California Young Reader Medal winners, 2020–present
Year	Category	Author	Title
2020	Primary	Drew Daywalt, illus. by Adam Rex	The Legend of Rock, Paper, Scissors
2020	Intermediate	Kimberly Brubaker Bradley	The War I Finally Won
2020	Middle School/Junior High	Alan Gratz	Refugee
2020	Picture Books for Older Readers	Dave Eggers, illus. by Shawn Harris	Her Right Foot
2020	Young Adult	Neal Shusterman	Scythe
2021	Primary	Tony Fucile	Poor Louie
2021	Intermediate	Gordon Korman	Restart
2021	Middle School/Junior High	Donna Gephart	Lily and Dunkin
2021	Picture Books for Older Readers	Patricia McCormick, illus. by Iacopo Bruno	Sergeant Reckless
2021	Young Adult	Wendy Mills	All We Have Left
2022	Primary	Minh Lê, illus. by Dan Santat	Drawn Together
2022	Intermediate	Dan Gemeinhart	The Remarkable Journey of Coyote Sunrise
2022	Middle School/Junior High	Kristin Levine	The Jigsaw Jungle
2022	Picture Books for Older Readers	Susan Wood, illus. by Gijsbert Van Frankenhuyzen	The Skydiving Beavers
2022	Young Adult	Ruta Sepetys	The Fountains of Silence
2023	Primary	Ryan T. Higgins	We Don't Eat Our Classmates
2023	Intermediate	Jennifer L. Holm	The Lion of Mars
2023	Middle School/Junior High	Ben Guterson	Winterhouse
2023	Picture Books for Older Readers	Caron Levis, illus. by Charles Santoso	This Way, Charlie
2023	Young Adult	Elizabeth Acevedo	With the Fire on High
