= Zorgamazoo =

2008 novel by Robert Paul Weston

- First printing of US hardcover
- Author: Robert Paul Weston
- Language: English
- Published: 2008 (Penguin)
- Publication place: United States
- Media type: Print (hardback)
- Pages: 283 pp (hardback edition)
- ISBN: 978-1-59514-199-6 (hardback edition)
- OCLC: 193819809
- LC Class: PZ7.5.W47 Zo 2008

Zorgamazoo (2008) is Canadian children's author Robert Paul Weston's first novel. The work is a fantasy adventure, written entirely in rhyming anapestic tetrameter.

The story follows a young girl named Katrina Katrell, who runs away from home when her guardian threatens her with a lobotomy. Seeking shelter beneath the street, she meets Mortimer Yorgle, who belongs to a subterranean race of creatures called zorgles. Although he is ill-suited for the job, Mortimer has been sent to solve the mystery of what happened to the lost zorgles of Zorgamazoo.

The novel is a 2009 E.B. White Honor Book and won the California Young Reader Medal, the Children's Choice Award, and the Silver Birch Award from the Ontario Library Association. It was also named a top ten debut of 2008 by Booklist Magazine and a notable book of 2009 by the Children's Literature Assembly.

== See also ==
- Dust City
