= Two-minute drill (disambiguation) =

Two-minute drill may refer to:

- Two-minute drill, in American football, a type of hurry-up offense instituted after the two-minute warning
- 2 Minute Drill (game show), a 2000 ESPN program
- Two-Minute Drill, a 2007 "Comeback Kids" novel by Mike Lupica
