= Robert Weston (disambiguation) =

Robert Weston (c. 1522–1573) was an English civil lawyer and Lord Chancellor of Ireland.

Robert Weston may also refer to:

- Robert Paul Weston (born 1975), author
- R. P. Weston (Robert Patrick Weston, 1878–1936), songwriter
- Bob Weston (born 1965), American musician, producer and recording engineer
- Bob Weston (guitarist) (1947–2012), British musician, briefly guitarist and songwriter with the rock band Fleetwood Mac
