= Pink and Say =

1994 children's book by Patricia Polacco

- First edition
- Author: Patricia Polacco
- Illustrator: Patricia Polacco
- Cover artist: Polacco
- Language: English
- Published: 1994
- Publisher: Philomel Books
- Publication place: USA
- Pages: 48.

Pink and Say is a children's book written and illustrated by Patricia Polacco. It was first published in 1994 by Philomel Books. The story is about two boy soldiers who meet each other in the battlefield during the American Civil War. One of the protagonists, Sheldon Russell Curtis ("Say"), is a white soldier who was injured while trying to escape battle. He is saved by a formerly enslaved boy named Pinkus Aylee ("Pink"), who is now a soldier of the 48th Regiment Infantry U.S. Colored Troops. Pink carries him back to his Georgia home where he and his family were slaves. While the frightened soldier is nursed back to health under the care of Pink’s mother, Moe Moe Bay, he begins to understand why his newfound friend is so adamant on returning to the war; to fight against the sickness that is slavery.

== Plot ==
During the American Civil War, teenaged Union soldier Sheldon Russell "Say" Curtis is left for dead on the battlefield after being wounded in the leg, but is found and rescued by fellow Union soldier Pinkus "Pink" Aylee, a teenaged former slave in the 48th Colored Infantry Regiment who has been separated from his unit. Finding Say delirious with fever, Pink carries him to the abandoned site of the Aylee family's plantation, where he formerly lived and worked during his time as a slave. With the plantation having been abandoned since the outbreak of the war, Pink's mother Moe Moe Bay now lives there alone, periodically taking refuge from Confederate "marauders".

Over the course of a week, Pink and Say gradually bond as Moe Moe Bay nurses Say back to health, and the two boys share their differing perspectives on the war. Say, who eventually confides to Moe Moe Bay that he was wounded while attempting to desert his unit, longs to leave the horrors of war and return to his family's farm in Ohio. By contrast, Pink is steadfast in his determination to crush the Confederacy, viewing the war as a moral crusade to rid America of the "sickness" of slavery. When Say reveals that he once touched the hand of Abraham Lincoln when he briefly met him prior to the First Battle of Bull Run, he invites Pink to touch his hand, knowing that it's the next best thing to touching Lincoln's hand himself.

Once Say recuperates from his wound, Pink and Say prepare to leave the plantation to rejoin Pink's old unit, fearing that they will attract the attention of marauders if they stay any longer. Before they can depart, however, marauders descend upon the plantation in search of food and supplies. At Moe Moe Bay's urging, Pink and Say take refuge in the root cellar while Moe Moe Bay runs from the plantation to draw the marauders away. When the boys emerge from the cellar, they find her shot to death.

During a long trek through the countryside, Pink and Say are eventually found and captured by Confederate soldiers before they can regroup with Union forces, and both are taken prisoner and shipped to Andersonville Prison. Upon arriving in Andersonville, Say sees Pink for the last time as the two are forcibly separated, with Pink making a final request to "touch the hand that touched Mr. Lincoln" as he is dragged away by Confederate troops. While Say eventually returns to Ohio some months later after being freed from Andersonville, having nearly died of starvation during his time as a prisoner, he learns that Pink was hanged within hours of his arrival, his body unceremoniously thrown into a limepit.

In a coda, Polacco reveals that Sheldon Russell Curtis was actually her great-great-grandfather, who lived until 1928 and orally passed down the story of his friendship with Pinkus Aylee to his children and grandchildren, the story eventually passing down through the generations to Polacco herself. Having intended the book to serve as a written memory of Aylee, who has no living descendants to remember his story for him, Polacco ends the story by asking the reader to say his name aloud and vow that he will never be forgotten.

== Reception ==
Pink and Say was well received by literary critics. Anita Silvey said in 2012 that she still cries every time she reads it. "In forty-eight pages Patricia Polacco brings children into the loss and heartache of the Civil War." It has also been called "probably the most powerful picture book written about the Civil War".

Pink and Say has been used by educators to engage with students in dialogue about topics such as race relations and man's inhumanity to man, and to teach them about the Civil War.

== Publication history ==
- 1994: Paperback, Philomel Books.
- 1996: Audio CD, Spoken Arts.
- 1997: In Spanish translation, Lectorum.
- February 15, 2000: In Chinese translation, Yuan-Liou Publishing.

The titles in translation are: Chinese: 平克和薛伊; pinyin: Píngkè hé Xuēyī, and in Spanish: Pink y Say.
