= Helen Lester =

American children's writer (born 1936)

- Children: 2
- Writing career
- Years active: 1979–present
- Genre: Children's fiction
- Notable work: Tacky the Penguin

Helen Lester (born June 12, 1936) is an American children's writer, best known for her character Tacky the Penguin in many of her children's stories.

Lester was born in Evanston, Illinois but has moved around the United States making homes in New York City, San Francisco, Chicago, Minneapolis and finally settling in Pawling, New York with her husband.

As a girl, Lester dreamed of getting married but never of being a writer. She became an elementary school teacher, got married and had two sons. After her sons were born, Lester took time off as a teacher and began writing children's literature. Her works are mainly influenced by her old second-grade students who helped produce characters such as Tacky the Penguin, Pinkerton the Pig, and Fragility the Hippopotamus.

Lester's first children's book was published in 1979, and her writing career took off from there. She has now published more than two dozen books.

Lester has illustrated a few of her own books, but illustrator Lynn Munsinger has produced the illustrations for Lester's books. Lester and Munsinger have collaborated on over a dozen children books.

Beyond writing, Lester spends time traveling the country, visiting schools and encouraging children to write. She has also written Author: A True Story (Houghton Mifflin, 1997; ISBN 0395827442, LCCN 96-9645), directed towards young writers and based on her school visits and the editing process as a writer.

== Tacky the Penguin ==
Tacky the Penguin is a series of children's picture books written by Lester and illustrated by Lynn Munsinger. Tacky is a fictional animal character whose individuality and humorous antics make him particularly appealing to young children. He first appeared in Tacky the Penguin, and subsequently in nine more books between 1989 and 2015. Editions of some of the books have been published in Braille, and in Spanish, Swedish, Chinese and Italian. E-book versions and audiobooks have also been published. A Tacky the Penguin plush toy was marketed by Merrimakers, Inc. in 2000.

=== Series summary ===
In each book, Tacky's loud, boisterous behavior is contrasted with that of his sleek, graceful penguin companions in "Nice Icy Land." and tolerance for the odd bird is rewarded. The illustrations by Lynn Munsinger show Tacky wearing a misbuttoned Hawaiian shirt and a purple plaid bow-tie while all the other penguins have a uniformly dignified tuxedo-like appearance. The other penguins sing sweetly together, but Tacky's voice is loud and off-key. They don't like Tacky until they see his loud un-penguin-like behavior scare away a group of hunters, rescuing them all. In each book, Tacky's behavior is disruptive but well-meaning and ultimately helpful, a humorous and endearing combination popular among younger readers. The books are recommended for pre-K to 3rd grade students.

=== Books ===
- Tacky the Penguin (1988) - "Tacky the penguin does not fit in with his sleek and graceful companions, but his odd behavior comes in handy when hunters come with maps and traps."
- Three Cheers for Tacky (1996) - "Tacky the penguin adds his own unique touch to his team's routine at the Penguin Cheering Contest, with surprising results."
- Tacky in Trouble (1997) - "Tacky the exuberant penguin accidentally goes sailboarding and winds up on a tropical island, where he meets an elephant who demands proof of Tacky's identity."
- Tacky and the Emperor (2000) - "While awaiting a visit from the Emperor, a group of penguins fail to recognize their friend Tacky in the Emperor's clothes."
- Tackylocks and the Three Bears (2004) - "Tacky the penguin and his friends perform a play for the little penguins in Mrs. Beakly's class, but with Tacky in the lead role, things do not go exactly as planned."
- Tacky and the Winter Games (2005) - "Tacky and his fellow penguins on Team Nice Icy Land train hard for the Winter Games, but Tacky's antics make their chances of winning a medal seem slim."
- Tacky Goes to Camp (2009) - "Tacky the penguin and his friends go to Camp Whoopihaha where they scare each other by telling ghost stories around the campfire, never expecting that one of the frightening stories will come true."
- Tacky's Christmas (2010) - "Goodly, Lovely, Angel, Neatly, Perfect, and Tacky are having a wonderful Christmas, complete with an unusual tree, when Tacky's odd behavior saves them from a group of hunters."
- Happy Birdday, Tacky! (2013) - "It had taken weeks and a lot of whispery chirps for Tacky the Penguin's friends to plan a perfect surprise birdday party for him on his special hatchday. With songs, presents, cake, fishy ice cream, and surprise entertainment from Iglooslavia's own Twinklewebs the Dance Queen, how could anything go wrong?"
- Tacky and the Haunted Igloo (2015) - "Tacky is not very helpful as Goodly, Lovely, Angel, Neatly, and Perfect plan and prepare for Halloween, turning their igloo into a haunted house and making treats, but while Tacky is finishing his costume something really frightening arrives, and only he can chase it away."

=== Characters ===
- Tacky: The penguin protagonist is as "a bumbler, the kind who couldn't waddle up to give a speech without falling beak-first into the podium," by Christine M. Hepperman in The Horn Book Magazine. As a literary character, he has been called "an icon of individuality," and "a modern-day Don Quixote, accidentally battling windmills of conformity." in Contemporary Authors.
- Goodly, Lovely, Angel, Neatly, and Perfect: Pretty penguins who march neatly in a row, dive gracefully, and sing pretty songs.

== Works ==
=== Tacky series ===
- Tacky the Penguin (1988)
- Three Cheers for Tacky (1996)
- Tacky in Trouble (1997)
- Tacky and the Emperor (2000)
- Tackylocks and the Three Bears (2004)
- Tacky and the Winter Games (2005)
- Tacky Goes to Camp (2009)
- Tacky’s Christmas (2010)
- Happy Birdday, Tacky! (2013)
- Tacky and the Haunted Igloo (2015)

=== Other ===
- A Porcupine Named Fluffy (1986)
- Score One for the SLOTHS (1987)
- The Wizard, the Fairy, and the Magic Chicken (1988)
- It Wasn't My Fault (1989)
- Pookins Gets Her Way (1990)
- Me First (1992)
- Wuzzy Takes Off (1995)
- Princess Penelope's Parrot (1996)
- Listen Buddy (1997)
- Author: A True Story (2002)
- Hooway for Wodney Wat (2002)
- Score One for the Sloths (2003)
- Something Might Happen (2003)
- Batter Up Wombat (2006)
- Hurty Feelings (2007)
- The Sheep in Wolf's Clothing (2007)
- Wodney Wat's Wobot (2011)
- All for Me and None for All (2012)
- The Loch Mess Monster (2014)
- Bravo, Bucket Head (2022)
