= Christmas Tapestry =

2002 picture book by Patricia Polacco

- Author: Patricia Polacco
- Language: English
- Genre: Picture Book
- Publisher: Philomel Books
- ISBN: 9780142411650

Christmas Tapestry is a 2002 picture book written and illustrated by Patricia Polacco. The story is about how a Christian family help a long-separated Jewish couple reunite during the Christmas season.

== About ==
When Jonathan's father, who is a Baptist preacher, moves to Detroit, he has to learn to adjust to a new town. Jonathan helps his father get the church ready for Christmas and when ice puts a hole in the wall, he goes out with his father to buy a tapestry to cover the hole with the last of their money. While he and his father wait at the bus stop, an old woman offers them tea and later discovers that the tapestry had been made by the old woman as a chuppah for her wedding then she and her husband were separated by World War II. On Christmas Eve, when the hole is going to be patched up, the man who is doing the work recognizes the chuppah also and it turns out that he is the long-lost husband whom the wife assumed was dead. He, like the woman had thought that the other had died in the Holocaust. In the end, the couple is brought together and Jonathan learns that "the universe unfolds as it should."

An author's note describes that the inspiration for her story came from two different ministers. The story is both interfaith and inter-generational in nature. The book is illustrated by Polacco in pencil and watercolor.

== Reviews ==
Publishers Weekly wrote that the story is slow sometimes, but "Polacco's signature illustrations of swirling snow, the fine tapestry and numerous love-filled faces invite readers to linger."
