= Travel Team =

2004 novel by Mike Lupica

- Author: Mike Lupica
- Language: English
- Publication date: 2004
- Publication place: United States

Travel Team is a young adult novel by columnist Mike Lupica, published in 2004. It follows a boy named Danny Walker who is cut from his travel basketball team because of his short stature, so his father Richie responds by forming a new travel team made up of players who were cut or did not try out. The novel was a children's chapter book New York Times best seller for three months, and was based in part on Lupica's experience when his son was cut from a basketball team.
