= Stellaluna =

Children's book by Janell Cannon

- Front cover
- Author: Janell Cannon
- Illustrator: Janell Cannon
- Cover artist: Janell Cannon
- Language: English
- Subject: Bats, Nocturnal creatures
- Genre: Children's story
- Publisher: Harcourt, Houghton Mifflin Harcourt, The Living Books Company
- Publication date: April 3, 1993
- Publication place: United States
- Media type: Print (paperback)
- Pages: 48

Stellaluna is a 1993 children's book written and illustrated by Janell Cannon. It is about a young fruit bat, Stellaluna, who becomes separated from her mother and finds her way to a nest of birds. She is adopted by them and learns bird-like behavior. Eventually, Stellaluna finds other bats and reunites with her mother, and she learns how to behave like a bat. She introduces the birds to her bat family. Stellaluna and the birds decide that, despite their many differences, they are still friends.

Cannon was interested in writing a story about bats because of the negative perceptions that many have of them, as well as because not many children's books featured them. She created the illustrations first, inspired by photographs of Gambian epauletted fruit bats. The art for the book was made with wax-based pencils, as well as airbrushed acrylic paint. These illustrations in particular were praised for their scientific accuracy, as well as for making the bats appealing.

Themes in Stellaluna include friendship, overlooking differences to find common ground, and the universality of feeling like a bat in a bird's world. One philosopher interpreted the book as showing that children are not either good or bad: children with non-conforming behaviors may be expressing their abilities and needs. Stellaluna's behaviors, though discouraged by mother bird, were not actually "bad behaviors", but rather an expression of her identity as a bat.

Stellaluna was a New York Times bestseller, appeared on the National Education Association's list of "Teachers' Top 100 Books for Children", and won several awards, including the 1996 Grammy Award for Best Spoken Word Album for Children. The book has been translated into thirty languages and was adapted into a short film, a puppet show, and a musical.

== Background ==
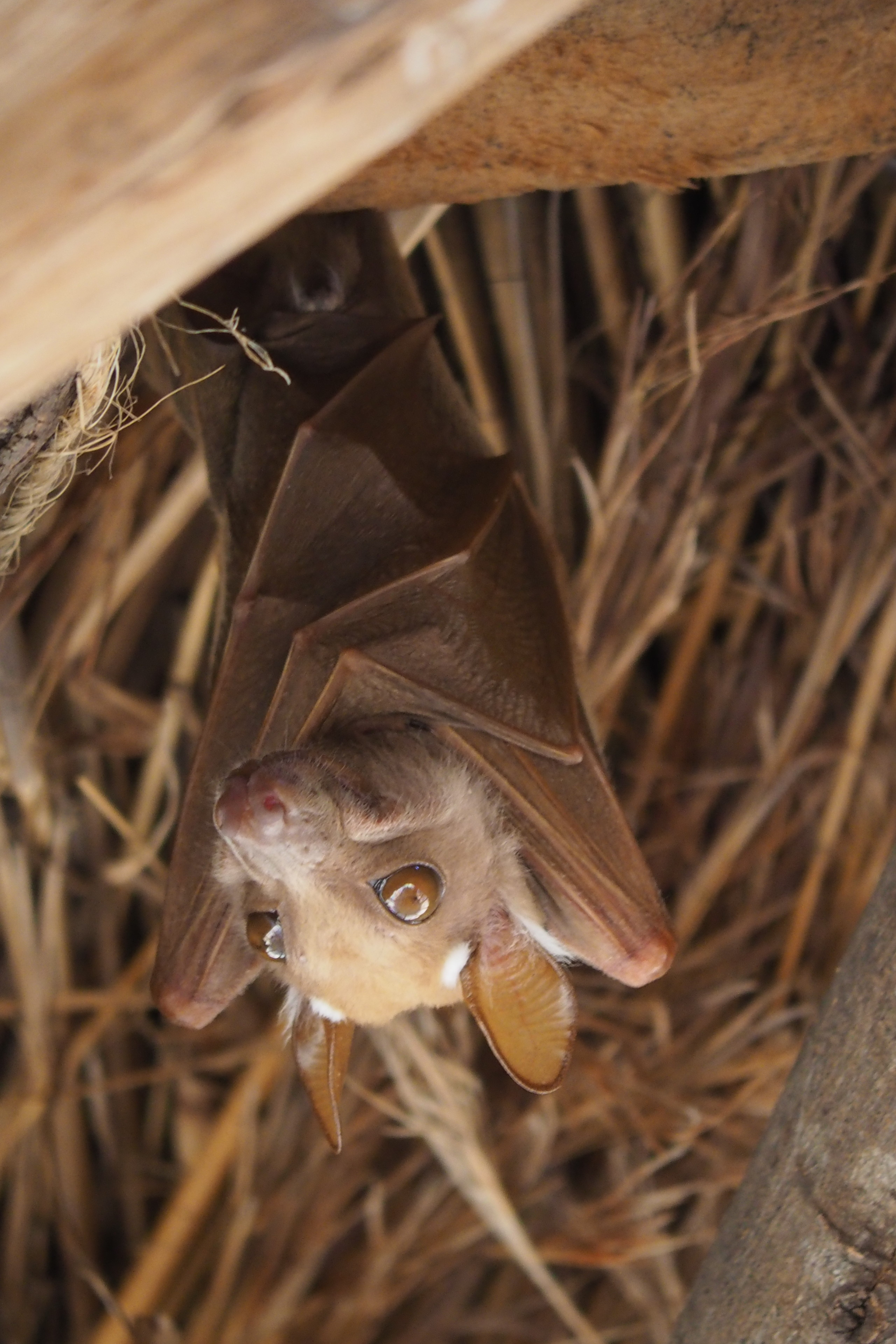
An example of an epauletted fruit bat, Wahlberg's epauletted fruit bat.

Author Janell Cannon grew up in rural Minnesota; her parents shared their enjoyment of nature with her and her siblings. She stated that she was a "free-range kid, able to gain an appreciation for animals like frogs, salamanders, snakes, and bats". She empathized with bats, as they are maligned by many cultures. She said, for bats to be "misunderstood and mistreated by humans, out of fear, really affected me". Later, when working at a library in California, Cannon noted that only three books in the children's section featured bats, of which two were eventually removed.

Cannon later took a trip to Thailand, where she felt that she belonged despite not knowing the Thai language. The connection she felt to the Thai people despite their differences in language and culture caused her to ask herself, "How can we be so different, yet feel so much the same?" This question lead her to consider writing a story where the theme was "overlooking differences in order to find common ground." When she returned to California, she began to create a children's book with this theme that featured bats; creating this book took several years. She credits the work of bat scientist and photographer Merlin Tuttle as part of her inspiration for Stellaluna. Specifically, she referred to Tuttle's 1986 National Geographic article, "Gentle Flyers of the African Night", which was about epauletted fruit bats. Cannon's characters were Gambian epauletted fruit bats, which she chose for their dog-like qualities and friendly-looking features.

Cannon signed with a literary agent, Sandra Dijkstra, who placed Stellaluna with the now-defunct publishing company Harcourt Brace Jovanovich (HBJ) in 1993.

== Plot ==
In a jungle of Africa, a mother fruit bat has a new baby, and names her Stellaluna. One night, an owl attacks the bats, knocking Stellaluna out of her mother's embrace, and she falls into the forest below. Soon the baby bat ends up in a sparrow's nest filled with three baby birds named Pip, Flitter and Flap. The mother bird will let Stellaluna be part of the family only if she eats bugs and worms, does not hang by her feet and sleeps at night.

When the birds grow, they learn to fly. When Stellaluna and the birds are out playing, it gets dark and the birds go home without her because they will not be able to see in the dark. Stellaluna keeps flying, but when her wings hurt, she stops to rest. When she does, she hangs by her thumbs. Soon other bats come, and one asks Stellaluna why she is hanging by her thumbs. As she tells the other bats her story, Mother Bat reunites with her and Stellaluna finally understands why she is so different.

Excited about learning how to be a bat, Stellaluna returns to Pip, Flitter, and Flap in order to share her new experiences. They agree to join Stellaluna and the bats at night, but find they are unsuited to flying at night and nearly crash. Stellaluna rescues them and the four of them decide that while they may be very different, they are still friends and family.

== Illustrations ==
Cannon created the illustrations in Stellaluna herself, painting the illustrations before she wrote the story. The art was created with Prismacolor wax-based pencils, as well as airbrushed Liquitex-brand acrylic paint. The illustrations were created on Bristol board. In the 1996 publication Children's Literature, the authors state that Cannon "put so much character in Stellaluna's face and body that the bat comes alive for the reader". Each full-page illustration is accompanied by a page of text. At the top of each page of text is a small, black-and-white ink illustration of Stellaluna's mother searching for her. Once Stellaluna and her mother are reunited, however, the ink illustrations portray Stellaluna for the rest of the book.

Kirkus Reviews emphasized the appeal of Cannon's illustrations, calling them "exquisite". They said that "the appealingly furry, wide-eyed, fawn-colored bats have both scientific precision and real character; they're displayed against intense skies or the soft browns and greens of the woodland in spare, beautifully constructed (occasionally even humorous) compositions". The illustrations were also praised for their accurate portrayal of bats, with one educator stating it is "one of the most beautiful science-based picture books I have come across". For the 25th anniversary of Stellaluna's publishing date, its artwork was displayed for seven weeks at a gallery in Carlsbad, California.

== Themes ==
In writing Stellaluna, Cannon stated that she wanted to demonstrate that feeling like "a bat in a bird's world" was universal. She also states that the story exemplifies that friendship and family can be found in unexpected ways. She states that a third theme is that of overlooking differences to find common ground.

Themes stated by others include "journey", belonging, friendship, diversity, and the struggle to conform. More indirect themes have been identified as well. Philosophy professor Shelley M. Park states that Stellaluna "[deconstructs] the notion of the 'bad child'". The mother bird treated Stellaluna as a bad child, identifying her as a corrupting influence on her biological offspring and discouraging her from enacting instinctive behaviors, such as sleeping during the day and roosting upside down. Park says that nonconforming behaviors in children "may be neither good nor bad but simply an expression of their needs and abilities", as they are with Stellaluna. While Park positively receives this message, she is critical of the converse message that is presented of mothers as either good or bad. The bird mother is not portrayed sympathetically, despite feeding and caring for Stellaluna after she was separated from her mother. After Stellaluna reunites with her mother, she continues her relationship with her bird siblings, but the bird mother is not included.

== Reception and cultural impact ==
Stellaluna was a commercial success, selling over two million copies in North America alone. Additionally, it was translated into thirty languages. It was a New York Times bestseller and appeared on the Parents magazine list of top 50 children's books, as well as in the New York Times's "50 Years of Children's Books" review.

Based on a 2007 online poll, the National Education Association listed the book as one of its "Teachers' Top 100 Books for Children". It was one of the "Top 100 Picture Books" of all time in a 2012 poll by School Library Journal.

In October 1994, Stellaluna was featured on the PBS children's show Reading Rainbow, where it was narrated by actress Anne Jackson. Stellaluna is referenced in the 2001 American film I Am Sam. Lucy, the daughter of a man with an intellectual disability, reads part of the book out loud, intentionally stumbling over the word "different". Cannon also stated that she has met children named "Stellaluna" after the character.

=== Awards ===
Stellaluna won many awards:

- 1994: American Booksellers Book of the Year (ABBY) Children's Winner
- 1995: Delaware Diamonds Award—Grades K-2
- 1995: Keystone to Reading Book Award—Children's
- 1996: Utah Beehive Picture Book Award (nominee)
- 1996: California Young Reader Medal—Primary
- 1996: Grammy Award for Best Spoken Word Album for Children
- 1998: Buckaroo Book Award—Children's
- 2014: Indies Choice Book Award—Picture Book Hall of Fame

== Adaptations ==
In 1994, The Cleveland Orchestra commissioned composer Arthur Hernández (b. 1961), who was then a doctoral student at the Cleveland Institute of Music, to compose a work for their children's Key Concert Series. This commission was an arrangement between The Cleveland Orchestra and the Cleveland Institute of Music's Composition Department led at the time by the American composer Donald Erb (1927-2008). As this was a children's concert, Hernández decided to base his musical work on the book Stella Luna by Janelle Canon. Hernández contacted Canon who gave her permission to use this work as the programmatic material for his musical work. The work, Stella Luna for Orchestra, was premiered on March 4, 1995, by The Cleveland Orchestra, under the direction of Alan Gilbert, at Severance Hall in Cleveland, Ohio.

In 1996, the book was adapted into an interactive PC version from Living Books. The Living Books version has the text and illustrations of the book, as well as songs and additional content like scientific bat facts, more pictures, and quizzes. This version has also since been adapted into an interactive mobile app by Wanderful Interactive Storybooks.

In 1999, there were plans for a Stellaluna animated series that would have been produced by Tundra Productions and Atomic Cartoons. The series was never picked up.

In 2004, a 41-minute direct-to-video animated musical film very loosely based on Stellaluna was released by MGM Home Entertainment. Actress Chiara Zanni voiced the character Stellaluna. Other main voice actors were Kathleen Barr, Lee Tockar as Askari, and Scott McNeil. It was re-released on DVD in 2012 with a bonus "Stellaluna Activity Booklet". Sandie Angulo Chen of Common Sense Media called the adaptation "sweet", saying that it was "fairly faithful to the book's premise" and that it encouraged viewers to "treat each other fairly and appreciate one other's differences". Sarah Bennor of The Dove Foundation called the film a "wonderful movie for kids of all ages".

In 2005, Emerald City Theatre Company debuted the musical Stellaluna and Other Tales by Alyn Cardarelli and Steve Goers. In addition to the bat Stellaluna, the musical contains the main characters from other works by Cannon: Verdi, about a python, and Pinduli, about a hyaena.

In 2008, the Tears of Joy Theatre performed a puppet show adaptation of Stellaluna for the first time. The theatre company took the show on tour, performing Stellaluna in nearly 500 theatres from 2009–2012. Author Janell Cannon enjoyed the puppet show so much, she brought it to her hometown to celebrate the anniversary of Stellaluna's publishing. Several other puppetry adaptations of Stellaluna have been made, including by playwright Saskia Janse.

== Selected translations ==
- Stellaluna, 1994, German (ISBN 3551515212)
- Stelaluna, 1994, Spanish (ISBN 8426128491)
- Stellaluna, 1996, French (ISBN 2227704616)
- Stellaluna, 1996, Italian (ISBN 8880930443)
- 星月 / Xing yue, 1999, Chinese (ISBN 9579828172)
- Serenola, 2000, Welsh (ISBN 1859028659)
