= Meteor! =

First edition

Meteor! is a 1987 children's picture book by author Patricia Polacco. Polacco is well known for writing and illustrating stories depicting events from her childhood in Michigan. Meteor! was published in 1987 by The Trumpet Club, commonly known for publications of children's books from grades PreK-6. The story is about Patricia, her brother Richard, and Cousin Steve as young children spending time with their grandparents on their farm in Michigan. It seems to be a normal summer night until a flash from the sky and a crash in the yard.

According to Publishers Weekly, "Based on a true event, this enchanting book overwhelmingly expresses the magic that suddenly pervades a small town, from the funny folksy way the story is told to the imaginative, full color illustrations."

Booklist says, "Polacco’s full-color pictures are completely in tandem with the telling".

== Story ==
The book tells the story of Patricia, her brother Steve, and her cousin Steve spending the summer at their grandparents' farm in Union City, Michigan. Late one night while sitting in their cozy home, a bright light falls from the sky landing in the Gaw's farm with a loud crash. Curiosity overcomes the family as they set foot outside to find a fallen star in their backyard. One line in the book reads, “Of all the places on earth a meteor could have fallen, it landed smack-dab in the middle of our yard, Gramma exclaimed.” This was such a huge deal for the residents of Mudsock Medow. Word gets around quickly, and before long there is a carnival at the Gaw farm. There is a band, a circus, a hot air balloon, and more. The entire town gathers to celebrate the meteor. Many residents touched the meteor claiming it was magical. It seemed like magic to all that the fallen star, which flew through the galaxy, had landed in Union City and brought such joy to all.

== Inspiration ==
Patricia Polacco's stories are mostly life experiences. She draws her ideas from her entire life. Her books are based on family stories as well. She learned stories from her family, which she uses as inspiration for her books. The tales in her books are also from experiencing the cultural traditions from both sides of her family. Meteor!, for example, was written because of the special encounter her mom had when she was a young girl on her grandparents' farm in Michigan.
