= Summer of '98 =

1999 book by Mike Lupica

- Author: Mike Lupica
- Cover artist: Walter Harper
- Language: English
- Genre: Non-fiction
- Publisher: Contemporary Books
- Publication date: 1999
- Publication place: United States
- Media type: Print (paperback)
- Pages: 209
- ISBN: 0-8092-2444-5
- Dewey Decimal: 796.357’0973’09049-dc21
- LC Class: GV863.A186

Summer of '98: When Homers Flew, Records Fell, and Baseball Reclaimed America is a 1999 book written by Mike Lupica, a sports columnist for the New York Daily News and an ESPN analyst. The book follows the 1998 baseball season that featured Mark McGwire and Sammy Sosa chasing Roger Maris's home run record. Lupica's book approaches the subject in a three generational context where his father, himself, and his son are all passionate baseball fans following the home run competition.

== Book summary ==
Summer of '98: When Homers Flew, Records Fell, and Baseball Reclaimed America, is presented in eight chapters plus a prologue and an epilogue.

- Prologue: March. Lupica writes about the relationship between himself and his son, Alex, through the prism of baseball.
- Chapter 1: April. Lupica, a New York Yankees fan, writes about McGwire's first home run of the season, a grand slam for the St. Louis Cardinals, and then brings the reader to opening day at Yankee Stadium where Joe DiMaggio throws out the first ball. Lupica also introduces the reader to his father, Bene Lupica. Buck Showalter and Chuck Knoblauch are also presented to the reader in this chapter.
- Chapter 2: May. Sosa and other members of the Chicago Cubs are introduced to the reader in this chapter to include Cubs' pitcher Kerry Wood who tied the major league strikeout record of 20 in the course of throwing a one hit shutout on May 6, 1998. Two weeks later, Yankees pitcher David Wells pitched baseball's fifteenth perfect game.
- Chapter 3: Omar Minaya discusses how he scouted and signed Sosa while working as a scout for the Texas Rangers. As June progresses, Sosa begins to catch up to McGwire's home run count. In the American League, the Yankees extend their lead as Roger Clemens has another successful season.
- Chapter 4: July. At the all-star break, the Yankees were 61–20 and held a large lead over other teams in the American League's Eastern Division. Lupica writes about Yankee leaders Paul O'Neill and Derek Jeter and how the veteran O'Neill and young star Jeter provide leadership for the team. The chapter ends with Lupica discussing Jim Bouton's reconciliation with the Yankees and his appearance in the Yankee's 1998 Old Timer's Game.
- Chapter 5: August. Darryl Strawberry, playing for the Yankees discusses his career and life challenges with Lupica, confident that his troubles are behind him. The Yankees, lengthening their lead in the American League East, were baseball's main story at the beginning of August, but as the month continued, the race between Sosa and McGwire took center stage.

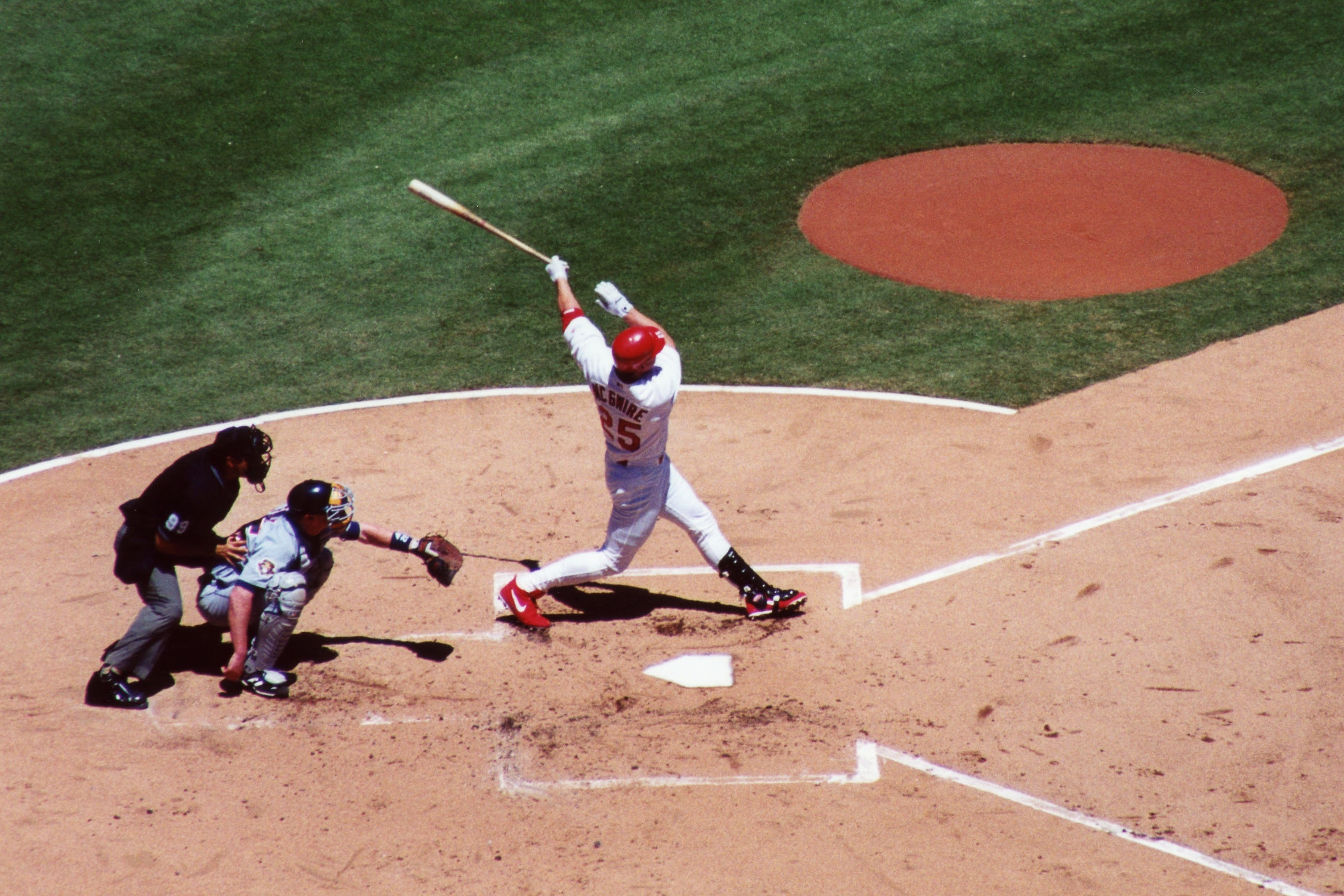
Mark McGwire broke Roger Maris single season record of 61 home runs but later admitted to using steroids.

- Chapter 6: September (first half): Lupica writes about the Yankees, Wells' quest for a second perfect game, and the home run race between McGwire and Sosa, both of them were attempting to break Roger Maris's home run record of 61 set in 1961. Maris, a native of Minnesota spent much of his youth in Fargo, North Dakota and Lupica writes about Maris, who died in 13 years earlier in 1985, his hometown and his boyhood friends. McGwire broke Maris' record on September 8 when he hit his 62nd home run. Lupica watched it on television with his sons and then called his father so that three generations of Lupica could share the experience. As the chapter draws to an end, Sosa also hits his 62nd home run and he and McGwire are tied for the lead as the season enters its final two weeks.
- Chapter 7: September (second half): The race between McGwire and Sosa continues to the end of season with McGwire hitting 70 home runs, five in the last three days of the season, and Sosa hitting 66. The Yankees won their division with a record of 114 wins and 48 losses.
- Chapter 8: October. The 1998 baseball season ends with the Yankees defeating the San Diego Padres in the 1998 World Series. Lupica discusses the American League Championship Series play where Chuck Knoblauch committed a mental lapse when he argued with an umpire instead finishing a play, thereby allowing a winning run to score in the series' second game. Darryl Strawberry is unable to finish the season as he was diagnosed with colon cancer at the beginning of the month.
- Epilogue. Lupica reminisces with his father and sons and hopes that he and his sons have the same relationship when they get older.

== Reception and reviews ==
Lupica's story of a father and son bonding over the game of baseball during a year when sport history was made, was widely praised by critics.

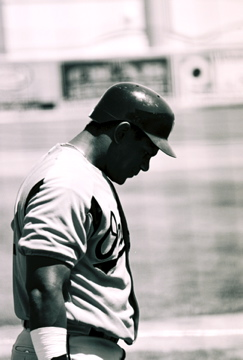
Sammy Sosa ended the 1998 season with 66 home runs but was later implicated in baseball's steroid scandal. Sosa is pictured above while trying to make a 2005 comeback with the Baltimore Orioles.

"In the summer of 1961, a young boy named Mike Lupica was fired up and inspired by the twin assault of Mickey Mantle and Roger Maris on Babe Ruth's 34-year-old home run record of 60 in a year. Ultimately, Maris pulled away near the end of the season and, on the final day, hit his 61st. On nights when contests would last too late for Lupica, then 9, to stay up until game's end, his dad would leave short notes: "Maris hit another one - 42. Mantle, 1-for-4, no home runs. Yanks, 5-2." Those were magical few months for Lupica as he grew up near Syracuse, a watershed time when he and his dad shared the joys of a signal summer. And so it was that, last summer, as Mark McGwire and Sammy Sosa chased Maris's home run record, Lupica, now a New York sportswriter and a father of two boys, was able to relive and re-create a baseball season hauntingly similar to the one 37 years ago. It was now Mike Lupica's time to leave notes: "McGwire, 45. Sosa, 41. Yanks win! Love, Dad." Through it all, Lupica's wife, Taylor, is mostly an onlooker, bemused at and confused by the excitement of all her boys. The couple also has a baby daughter, Hannah, and Lupica says he promises not to buy her a baseball glove until she's at least three years old. As soon as Hannah can read, Lupica says he'll leave her a note: "Watch every move your mother makes." When it all ends with McGwire's 70 homers and Sosa's 66, Mike Lupica tells his father: "It was a pretty good summer, Pop." And his dad responds, "They all are."

"If you believe all the stuff about the romance returning to baseball, then read Mike Lupica's "Summer of '98: When homers flew, records fell, and baseball reclaimed America." Lupica, a columnist for the New York Daily News, waxes poetic about the many great moments in 1998. His 7-year-old son, Alex, is the thread, as Lupica writes how the boy became captivated by the season, much like he did during the glorious summer of 1961. If baseball was a father-son experience for you, it's a good read."

== Aftermath ==
During the 1998 season, McGwire admitted to taking androstenedione, an over-the-counter performance enhancement drug that was banned by the World Anti-Doping Agency, the NFL and the IOC, but not by Major League Baseball. In the years following 1998, the continued increase in offensive production caused critics to question how players were suddenly becoming more powerful. Many speculated that players were using anabolic steroids to increase their strength and endurance. Use of the banned drug was subsequently revealed by Jose Canseco in his 2005 book Juiced: Wild Times, Rampant 'Roids, Smash Hits & How Baseball Got Big where he alleged that 85% of baseball players were using the banned substance. Among those he accused was McGwire, his former Oakland Athletics teammate. The following year, Lance Williams and Mark Fainaru-Wada, investigative reporters for the San Francisco Chronicle published the Game of Shadows where they detailed alleged steroid use by Barry Bonds and implied that both McGwire and Sosa had also used the banned drug. Both McGwire and Sosa, along with other baseball players including Rafael Palmeiro testified to Congress in 2005 that they never used steroids. However, in 2010, McGwire finally admitted to using steroids during the 1980s and 1990s. While Sosa did not admit to using the drugs, it is widely believed that he used them during the 1990s to enhance his performance.

The revelations about steroid use subsequently caused some critics to question the value of Lupica's book.

"The truth is, had the baseball writers been better reporters, we wouldn't even have this controversy. Look at the hypocrisy of some of these guys. NY Daily News sportswriter Mike Lupica wrote a book about Mark McGwire and Sammy Sosa's epic summer of 98 entitled The Summer of '98: When Homers Flew, Records Fell, and Baseball Reclaimed America, a heartwarming story of how that summer and baseball enabled him to connect with his son. Twelve years later, after McGwire apologized for using steroids ... Lupica wrote an article where he bashes McGwire for coming forward. Great lesson to teach your son Mike."
