= Joan Lowery Nixon =

American journalist and author (1927–2003)

- Born: February 3, 1927; Los Angeles, California, US
- Died: June 28, 2003 (aged 76); Houston, Texas
- Occupation: Author
- Spouse: Hershell Nixon
- Children: Kathleen Brush Maureen Quinlan; Eileen McGowan Joe Nixon
- Writing career
- Genre: Young adult fiction

Joan Lowery Nixon (February 3, 1927 – June 28, 2003) was an American journalist and author, specializing in historical fiction and mysteries for children and young adults.

== Biography ==
Joan Lowery was born on February 3, 1927, in Los Angeles, California. In 1947, she received a degree in journalism from the University of Southern California. At USC, she met her husband, Hershell, a United States Navy officer and a geologist. At USC she was a member of Kappa Delta sorority. She taught school in Los Angeles before starting her family. In 1964 her first book for children, The Mystery of Hurricane Castle, was published. Her son, Joe Nixon, is a Houston lawyer, who was from 1995 to 2007 a Republican member of the Texas House of Representatives from District 133 in Houston. Nixon, her husband, and their children lived in Corpus Christi, Texas, before finally settling in the Memorial and Tanglewood area of Houston, Texas. She died of pancreatic cancer in Houston on June 28, 2003.

== Work ==
Nixon wrote more than 140 books, including The Kidnapping of Christina Lattimore (1979). She co-authored several science books with her geologist husband Hershell Nixon.

Nixon was the only author to win four Edgar Allan Poe Awards from the Mystery Writers of America, and had five additional nominations. She won the California Young Reader Medal of the California Library Association twice. She also won the Western Writers of America's Golden Spur Award twice, and received the Texas Institute of Letters Award. Her book Land of Hope is used in some middle schools.

Her novel The Other Side of Dark was made into the 1995 TV movie Awake To Danger, starring Tori Spelling and Michael Gross.
