= Al Capone Does My Shirts =

2006 novel by Gennifer Choldenko

- Author: Gennifer Choldenko
- Language: English
- Series: A's literature
- Set in: Alcatraz Island, near San Francisco in 1935
- Published: Puffin; reprint edition (April 20, 2006)
- Publication place: United States
- Pages: 225
- Awards: Newbery Honor selection, California Young Reader Medal in 2007
- Followed by: Al Capone Shines My Shoes; Al Capone Does My Homework; Al Capone Throws Me A Curve

Al Capone Does My Shirts is a historical fiction novel for young adults by the author Gennifer Choldenko. In the book, Moose Flanagan and his family move from Santa Monica to Alcatraz Island when his father takes a new job as an electrician and a prison guard in the well-known Alcatraz prison. The book was named a Newbery Honor selection, and in 2007 it received the California Young Reader Medal. It has three sequels: Al Capone Shines My Shoes, Al Capone Does My Homework, and Al Capone Throws Me a Curve.

== Plot ==
In 1935, Matthew "Moose" Flanagan and his family move from Santa Monica to Alcatraz Island when his father takes a new job as an electrician and a guard in the well-known Alcatraz prison. Moose becomes friends with the warden's daughter, Piper, who regularly gets into trouble in her attempts to get money to get off Alcatraz. Piper talks Moose into being part of her money-making schemes, like having inmates on the island do laundry for the kids at school. When the scheme fails and the warden receives word of it, the children are punished and have to find a new way to spend their time.

In an attempt to gain acceptance, Moose hangs around the rec center in hopes of finding a stray baseball for use in games with the other kids. Moose eventually notices his older sister Natalie developing a relationship with convict 105, also known as Onion, who is trusted and able to roam freely because his sentence is almost up. Onion knows Moose has been looking for a baseball and gives him one.

Still uneasy about his sister's hanging out with a convict, Moose is reassured only by his confidence that she will be re-accepted to the Esther P. Marinoff School for people with special needs. However, Moose and his family's aspirations are crushed when the school rejects Natalie. Desperate to help his sister, Moose, with the help of Piper, writes a letter to the infamous criminal Al Capone, who works in Alcatraz's laundry. The letter asks Capone to pull any strings he has to help Moose's family get his sister back into school. Within days, Natalie is accepted into a new branch of the school, for older children. The next day, Moose is getting ready for the day when he finds a note on the sleeve of his shirt with the word "Done" underlined.

== Other stories ==
It has three sequels: Al Capone Shines My Shoes (2011), Al Capone Does My Homework (2014), and Al Capone Throws Me a Curve (2018). A new book is in development.

== Awards ==
- Newbery Honor
- California Young Reader Medal

== Critical reception ==
Kirkus Review gave the book a positive review, stating "Choldenko's pacing is exquisite, balancing the tense family dynamics alongside the often-humorous and riveting school story of peer pressure and friendship." Miranda Doyle of The School Library Journal says "The story, told with humor and skill, will fascinate readers with an interest in what it was like for the children of prison guards and other workers to grow up on Alcatraz Island." Ed Sullivan of Booklist states in his review, "With its unique setting and well-developed characters, this warm, engaging coming-of-age story has plenty of appeals, and Choldenko offers some fascinating historical background on Alcatraz Island in an afterword."

== Stage performance ==
In 2011, the book was adapted as a stage performance at the Children's Theatre of Western Springs.

In 2019, the book was adapted as a stage performance at Mission Cultural Center by the San Francisco Youth Theatre.
