= Just Plain Fancy =

Book by Patricia Polacco

- First edition (publ. Bantam Books)
- Author: Patricia Polacco
- Publisher: Bantam Books
- Publication date: September 1, 1990
- Pages: 32
- ISBN: 978-0-553-07062-0

Just Plain Fancy is a children's picture book by American writer and illustrator Patricia Polacco, first published in 1990 by Bantam Books.

== Plot ==
It tells the story of Naomi and Ruth, two young Amish girls. One day, they find a mysterious egg lying in the grass. They soon realize that this is a fancy egg. It is sparkly and multicolored and thoroughly unacceptable for the Amish way of life. It hatches into a fancy “chicken.” Amish people cannot have anything fancy, or they get kicked out. Naomi and Ruth fear for their precious fancy chicken, and for themselves. At a big gathering at their house, the bird is exposed. Naomi and Ruth are very frightened, especially when it flies at the elders and spreads its tail. They are shocked to find that it is actually a peacock!
