= Ave Pildas =

American photographer and designer (born 1939)

- Born: Cincinnati
- Education: University of Cincinnati;Cincinnati Art Academy;Schule für Gestaltung Basel
- Known for: Photography, typography, design
- Spouse: Phyllis Green
- Website: www.avepildas.com

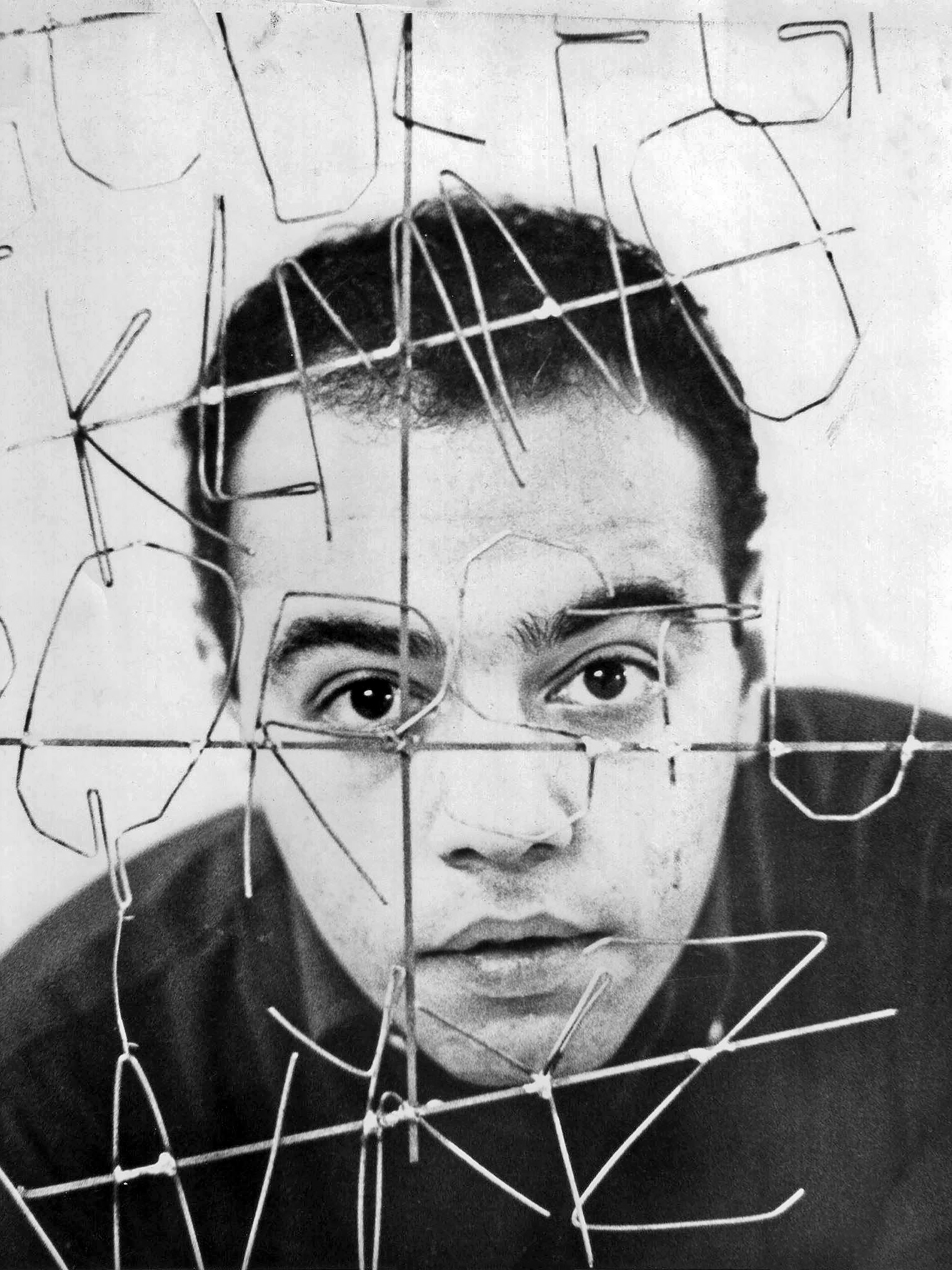
Late 1950s, a self-portrait of Ave Pildas while attending Design School at Cincinnati Art Academy.

Ave Pildas (born September 16, 1939) is an American photographer, designer, and art educator known for his work in both the music industry and fine arts. He gained recognition for his early photographs of jazz musicians, including Nina Simone, Dizzy Gillespie, John Coltrane and Dave Brubeck, that were published in DownBeat magazine during the 1960s. His fifty year practice reflects photography’s dual role as an instrument of social justice and social concerns as well as its various manifestations as an artform.

== Early life and education ==
Ave Pildas was born in Cincinnati, Ohio, where he attended high school and college. He studied architecture at the University of Cincinnati, and Graphic Design at the Cincinnati Art Academy. While attending college, he worked as the Art Director for the Public Library System of Cincinnati.

Upon graduation, he worked in Pittsburgh, PA, designing collateral for major corporations such as Westinghouse, US Steel, Alcoa Aluminum, and Koppers. In 1965, he enrolled at the Schule für Gestaltung Basel, Switzerland. He received his graduate degree in Graphic Design and Typography in 1967. During schools breaks, he traveled extensively in Europe and parts of Africa. Pildas returned to the United States to teach design at Layton School of Art in Milwaukee in Milwaukee in 1968.

In 1969, he moved to Philadelphia, Pennsylvania, to become assistant professor of design at the Philadelphia College of Art (University of the Arts).

In 1971, Pildas moved to California to assume a position as an art director at Capitol Records in Hollywood, where he designed and photographed album covers and marketing materials for many recording artists. His notable projects included albums Joy to the World by Hoyt Axton, Daddy Don't You Walk So Fast by Wayne Newton, and photography and design for projects with Paul McCartney, Charlie Daniels, Freddie King, and Leon Russel. Pildas also designed the album The Road Is No Place for a Lady by Cass Elliot for MGM Records. He also contributed to MGM Records Archetypes Series, which featured artists like The Velvet Underground, Billie Holiday, and Charlie Parker. At Playboy Records, he designed album covers for singers Laurie Kaye Cohen and Brenda Patterson. He also designed and illustrated "The Songs of Stevie Wonder" songbook for Stevie Wonder.

In 1972, he co-founded "Plug In," a design studio, and produced work for many clients in the entertainment industry. By the late 70s, his images appeared in popular magazines worldwide, such as "Interiors Magazine," "Architectural Digest", and "Art and Antiques Magazine".

Pildas is married to artist Phyllis Green.

He currently resides in Santa Monica, California.

== Photography and Teaching ==
=== 1960–1970 ===
As a young fan of jazz, Ave took his camera to nightclubs, after-hours spots and music festivals in Cincinnati and Pittsburgh. He shot hundreds of images that documented the Midwestern jazz circuit of the decade.

=== 1970–1980 ===
Ave photographed spontaneous moments on the celebrated Hollywood Boulevard "Walk of Fame". Many of those photos were published in ‘Zoom’, ‘Photo’, ‘Creative Camera’ and other magazines of the 1970s. They were also exhibited in both the United States and Europe. During the same decade, he photographed theater box offices and interiors, some of which were collected as a series titled “Bijou”. Others were included in a book titled Movie Palaces published by Crown Publishers (Clarkson and Potter) with a foreword by director King Vidor.

=== 1980–1990 ===
Pildas maintained a professional photography practice in Los Angeles. His commercial clients included Minolta Corporation, KCET, and Panda Restaurants. He served as a Professor of Design at Otis College of Art and Design in Los Angeles and lectured at the School of Architecture at the University of California, Los Angeles. He was also a guest lecturer at Leicester Polytechnic Institute in Leicester, England, and at Ravensbourne College of Art in Ravensbourne, England.

=== 1990–2000 ===
While he continued to teach classes in design and photography, Pildas became the Director of Publications at Otis College of Art and Design. He also traveled extensively to foreign destinations, mostly in Central and South America, to photograph and to study other cultures.

=== 2000–2010 ===
Pildas was appointed Chairman of the Communication Arts Department at Otis College of Art and Design in 2001. He was elected a Vice President of Education for the American Institute of Graphic Arts (AIGA) in Los Angeles. During this decade, Movie Palaces was republished by Hennessy & Ingalls in Los Angeles.

=== 2010–2020 ===
Pildas retired from Otis College of Art and Design as Professor Emeritus to focus on art photography. He started a publishing company, "Small Photo Books." A collection of images of theater box office tilted Bijou was published in 2016 by Nazraeli Press. Pildas exhibited his photographs in various contemporary art venues, including:

- The Santa Monica Museum, Santa Monica, CA
- New York Public Library, "Public Eye: 175 Years of Sharing Photography" New York, NY
- LACE: Los Angeles Contemporary Exhibitions, CA
- A+D Architecture and Design Museum in Los Angeles, CA
- Griffin Museum of Photography in Winchester, MA.
- Venice Institute of Contemporary Art (VICA) in Los Angeles, CA
- Joseph Bellows Gallery, La Jolla, CA

=== 2020–present ===
Star Struck, a collection of images shot by Pildas on Hollywood Boulevard in the 1970s, was published by Deadbeat Club Press, Los Angeles. "Ave's America", a feature-length documentary highlighting Pildas’ legacy as a street photographer was released in 2023. It was directed and produced by Patrick Taulere and Art7 Films and was screened at The Palm Springs International Film Festival and The Chelsea Film Festival in New York. It is currently streams on Prime Network. Pildas exhibited his photographs at Tufenkian Gallery in Glendale, CA and at Perfect Exposure Gallery in Alhambra, CA.

== Exhibitions and collections ==
His photographs are included in the collections of major institutions such as the Los Angeles County Museum of Art (LACMA), the Crocker Art Museum, the New York Public Library, the Bibliothèque Nationale de France, and various public and private collections. In 2014, his work was featured in the exhibition "Public Eye: 175 Years of Sharing Photography," organized by the New York Public Library (NYPL). In 2021, one of his well-known photographs titled "Power to the People" was displayed on a bus in Lancaster, California, as part of an exhibition organized by LACMA in collaboration with various museums including the Lancaster Museum of Art and History, Riverside Art Museum, Vincent Price Art Museum at East Los Angeles College, and California State University, Northridge Art Galleries.

His photographs have been exhibited in one-person shows at the following: Contemporary Arts Center, Cincinnati, Photographers Gallery, London, Janus Gallery, Los Angeles, Gallerie Diaframma, Milan, Cannon Gallery, Amsterdam, Gallerie 38, Zurich, Joseph Bellows, Photo LA, The Loft, The Perfect Exposure Gallery, Tufenkian Fine Arts and in numerous group shows. They have been featured in: The New York Times Magazine, The Guardian, L’Oeil de la Photographie, 'ZOOM', 'PHOTO', 'CAMERA', 'photographic' and many other publications worldwide. Photographs by Ave Pildas are included in the collections of LACMA, the Bibliotheca National, Paris; the University of Arizona as well as numerous other public and private collections.

== Published books ==
Four books featuring West Coast photographs by Pildas have been published:

- Pildas, Ave (1977). Art deco : Los Angeles : photographs (1st ed.). New York: Harper & Row. ISBN 0-06-013338-4. OCLC 3670911
- Pildas, Ave (2016). Bijou. Paso Robles, CA: Nazraeli Press. ISBN 978-1-59005-459-8. OCLC 960852357
- Pildas, Ave (2000). Movie palaces. Smith, Lucinda. Santa Monica, CA: Hennessey + Ingalls. ISBN 0-940512-25-4. OCLC 44267725
- Pildas, Ave (2022). STAR STRUCK. Los Angeles, CA: DeadBeat Club. ISBN 978-1-952523-04-5

Small Photo Books catalog includes:

- Pildas, Ave (2015). Animal Antics: Small Books.
- Pildas, Ave (2020). Circles, Squares + Triangles: Small Books. ISBN 978-0-9985964-9-5
- Pildas, Ave (2015). 10 Great Jazz: Small Books.
- Pildas, Ave (2015). Nudes. Los Angeles: Small Books. ISBN 978-0998596402
- Pildas, Ave (2015). Odd Shots. Los Angeles: Small Books. ISBN 0998596418
- Pildas, Ave (2015). People on Stars. Los Angeles: Small Books. ISBN 0998596426
- Pildas, Ave (2015). Photomat / Photos. Los Angeles: Small Books. ISBN 0998596442
- Pildas, Ave (2015). Shadows / Silhouettes. Los Angeles: Small Books. ISBN 0998596450
- Pildas, Ave (2015). Street / People. Los Angeles: Small Books. ISBN 0998596434
- Pildas, Ave (2017). We Are Not Ok: Small Books. ISBN 978-0-9985964-6-4

== Selected bibliography ==
- Pildas, Ave (2015-08-05). "Where the streets are paved with stars: Hollywood Boulevard in the 70s – in pictures". The Guardian. ISSN 0261-3077. Retrieved 2020-10-15
- "Strippers, wedding trucks and dinosaurs: the brilliant 50-year photography career of Ave Pildas". www.itsnicethat.com. Retrieved 2020-10-15
- "Interview with Ave Pildas". Street Photography Magazine. 2014-05-21. Retrieved 2020-10-15
- "The Seedy Glamour of Nineteen-Seventies Hollywood".The New Yorker. Retrieved 2023-01-16
