= Mike Lupica =

American novelist and sportswriter

Michael Lupica
- Born: May 11, 1952 (age 74); Oneida, New York, U.S.
- Education: Boston College
- Occupations: Columnist; author
- Writing career
- Subjects: Sports
- Website: mikelupicabooks.com

Michael Lupica (/ˈluːpɪkə/; born May 11, 1952) is an American author and former newspaper columnist, best known for his provocative commentary on sports in the New York Daily News and his appearances on ESPN.

== Biography ==
Lupica was born in Oneida, New York, where he spent his pre-adolescent years, having attended St. Patrick's Elementary School through the sixth grade. In 1964, he moved with his family to Nashua, New Hampshire, where he attended middle school and subsequently Bishop Guertin High School, graduating in 1970. In 1974 he graduated from Boston College. He first came to prominence as a sportswriter in Pottstown, Pennsylvania. Lupica wrote "The Sporting Life" column at Esquire magazine for ten years beginning in the late 1980s, and currently writes a regular column for Travel + Leisure Golf. He has also written for Golf Digest, Parade, ESPN The Magazine, and Men’s Journal, and has received numerous awards including, in 2003, the Jim Murray Award from the National Football Foundation.

=== Columnist ===
Lupica began working for the New York Daily News in 1977 and spent the majority of his career as a columnist there, except for brief stints with Newsday and The National Sports Daily. He wrote several sports columns during the week for the Daily News, as well as a signature Sunday column, "Shooting from the Lip," which featured a traditional column followed by a series of short, acerbic observations from the week in sports. Later in his career he began writing a regular political column entitled "Mondays with Mike," which is strongly liberal in orientation. He left the Daily News in July 2018.

Favorite Lupica targets included the New York Yankees (and will often state their massive payroll in most of his articles), James L. Dolan, Isiah Thomas, Notre Dame football, Rudy Giuliani, Michael Bloomberg, former president George W. Bush, and former vice president Dick Cheney. Lupica has also been a harsh critic of the new Yankee Stadium and was a vehement opponent of the proposed West Side Stadium. He has likewise been highly critical of the Atlantic Yards project and the attendant construction of the Barclays Center in Brooklyn.

=== Author ===
Lupica co-wrote autobiographies with Reggie Jackson and Bill Parcells and collaborated with screenwriter William Goldman on the nonfiction book Wait Till Next Year. Lupica also wrote the books Mad as Hell: How Sports Got Away From the Fans and How We Get It Back and Summer of ’98: When Homers Flew, Records Fell, and Baseball Reclaimed America, which detailed how the 1998 and the Mark McGwire/Sammy Sosa home run chase had allowed him to share a love for baseball with his son. Lupica has been listed a vocal critic of the steroid era.

Lupica is also a novelist; his work includes mysteries involving fictional NYC television reporter Peter Finley. One of them, Dead Air, was nominated for the Edgar Allan Poe Award for Best First Mystery and the 1987 Anthony Award in the same category; and was also adapted into a television movie called Money, Power, Murder. He has written a novel for younger audiences called Travel Team. Lupica’s Bump and Run and Wild Pitch were best sellers. 2003 saw a sequel to Bump and Run, entitled Red Zone.In April 2006, his second children's book, Heat, was published by Philomel. Heat is a fictional story based on the Danny Almonte scandal in the South Bronx Little League. In October 2006, Lupica's third children's novel, Miracle on 49th Street, was published. Summer Ball, a sequel to Travel Team, was released in 2007.

Lupica has also written several continuation novels for the characters created by the late crime author Robert B. Parker.

=== Television and radio work ===
Since 1988 Lupica has been one of the rotating pundits on The Sports Reporters on ESPN. He also briefly hosted an unsuccessful television chat program, The Mike Lupica Show, on ESPN2, as well as a short-lived radio show on WFAN in New York City in the mid-1990s. He has been a recurring guest on the CBS Morning News, Good Morning America, and The MacNeil-Lehrer Newshour. Lupica has made frequent radio appearances on Imus in the Morning since the early 1980s. Lupica hosted a daily radio show on WEPN-FM from May 9, 2011, until August 21, 2015.

== Works ==
=== Non-series books ===
==== Adult books ====
- Reggie! (with Reggie Jackson, 1984)
- Parcells: An Autobiography of the Biggest Giant of Them All (with Bill Parcells, 1987)
- Wait 'till Next Year: The Story of a Season When What Should've Happened Didn't and What Could've Gone Wrong Did (with William Goldman, 1988)
- Shooting From The Lip: Essays, Columns, Quips, and Gripes in the Grand Tradition of Dyspeptic Sports Writing (1988)
- Jump! (1995)
- Mad as Hell: How Sports Got Away from the Fans and How We Get It Back (1996)
- Summer of '98: When Homers Flew, Records Fell, and Baseball Reclaimed America (1999)
- Yankees '98: Best Ever! (a compendium of Daily News coverage, 1999)
- Bump and Run (2000)
- Full Court Press (2001)
- Wild Pitch (2002)
- Red Zone (2003)
- Too Far (2004)
- Best American Sports Writing 2005 (edited by; 2005)
- Fathers & Sons & Sports: An Anthology of Great American Sports Writing (2008)

==== Young adult books ====
- Heat (2005)
- Miracle on 49th Street (2006)
- The Big Field (2008)
- Million-Dollar Throw (2009)
- The Batboy (2010)
- Hero (2010)
- Underdogs (2011)
- True Legend (2012)
- QB 1 (2013)
- Fantasy League (2014)
- The Only Game (2015)
- Fast Break (2015)
- The Extra Yard (2017)

=== Series ===
==== Adult series ====
Peter Finley series

- Dead Air (1986)
- Extra Credits (1990)
- Limited Partner (1990)

Robert B. Parker's Sunny Randall series

- Blood Feud (2018)
- Grudge Match (2020)
- Payback (2021)
- Revenge Tour (2022)

Robert B. Parker's Jesse Stone series

- Fool's Paradise (2020), G.P. Putnam ISBN 978-0525542087
- Stone's Throw (2021), G.P. Putnam ISBN 9780525542117
- Fallout (2022), G.P. Putnam ISBN 9780593540275

Robert B. Parker's Spenser series

- Broken Trust (2023)
- Hot Property (2024)
- Showdown (2025)

==== Young adult series ====
Comeback Kids series

- Two-Minute Drill (2007)
- Hot Hand (2007)
- Safe at Home (novel) (2008)
- Long Shot (2008)
- Shoot-Out (2010)

Game Changers series

- Game Changers (2012)
- Play Makers (2013)
- Heavy Hitters (2014)

Zach and Zoe mystery series

- The Hockey Rink Hunt

Related books

- Travel Team (2004)
- Summer Ball (2007)
