= Pamela Duncan Edwards =

British born children's author

- Occupation: author
- Known for: picture books

Pamela Duncan Edwards is a British born children's author who now lives in the US. She has published over forty picture books for children, both in America and Britain.
