= Robert Paul Weston =

British-born Canadian children's writer (born 1975)

- Born: Dover, England
- Occupation: Writer
- Writing career
- Genres: Young adult fiction, short stories
- Notable work: Zorgamazoo
- Website: robertpaulweston.com

Robert Paul Weston is a British-born Canadian author of short stories, and novels for children and young adults. His debut was the award-winning novel-in-verse, Zorgamazoo. His second novel, Dust City, a dark fantasy for young adults, is narrated by the son of the wolf who killed Little Red Riding Hood. The book was shortlisted for the 2011 Edgar Allan Poe Award for Best Young Adult Mystery.

He publishes short fiction internationally and teaches Creative Writing at the University of Lincoln.

== Personal life ==
Robert Paul Weston was born in 1975 in Dover, England to a Grenadian-Indian mother and a British-Turkish father. He holds an MFA in Creative Writing from the University of British Columbia.

== Prizes and honours ==
- 2009 E.B. White Read Aloud Honour (for Zorgamazoo)
- 2009 Children's Literature Association Notable Books of 2009 (Zorgamazoo)
- 2010 Silver Birch Fiction Award (for Zorgamazoo)
- 2011 California Young Reader Medal (for Zorgamazoo)
- 2011 Edgar Allan Poe Honour, Best Young Adult Mystery (Dust City)

== Works ==
=== Novels ===
- Zorgamazoo (2008) Razorbill
- Dust City (2010) Razorbill
- The Creature Department (2013) Razorbill
- Prince Puggly of Spud and the Kingdom of Spiff (2013) Puffin
- Gobbled by Ghorks (A Creature Department Novel) (2014) Razorbill
- Blues for Zoey (2016) Flux Books

=== Picture books ===
- Sakura's Cherry Blossoms (2018) Tundra
- Natsumi's Song of Summer (2020) Tundra

=== Short fiction ===
- "Mourning Sickness", On Spec, No. 62, Winter 2005
- "The Light Switch Method", Kiss Machine, No. 10, June 2005
- "Thinking of Alice", Crimewave Magazine, Vol. 9, Fall 2006
- "Stop Plate Tectonics", On Spec, No. 68, Spring 2007
- "Paris, France (Somnumbulitis)", The New Orleans Review, Vol. 33, No. 1, Fall 2007
- "Hummingbirds and Pie", Postscripts, Vol. 12, Autumn 2007
- "Salve", Postscripts, Vol. 14, Spring 2008
- "Tuesdays", The Raleigh Review, Autumn 2023
- "Maquettes", Litro Magazine, 6 December 2023
- "LGM-1", The Normal School, 20 March 2024
- "A God-Awful Small Affair", The Stinging Fly, Issue 50/Volume 2, Summer 2024
- “Lucky Number”, The Vassar Review, Issue 10: Frame and Forgery, May 2025
