= Kelly Oechsli =

American writer

Kelly Oechsli (23 February 1918 – 18 October 1999) was an American illustrator (and occasionally author) of children's books. He illustrated Sesame Street and Fraggle Rock books, as well as children's encyclopediae such as the young children's encyclopedia .

== Books ==
Oechsli has been a part of a number of books which include:

- The Haunting of Grade Three by Grace Maccarone, Kelly Oechsli (Illustrator)
- Scruffy by Peggy Parish, Kelly Oechsli (Illustrations)
- The Sesame Street Storybook by Jeff Moss, Jon Stone, Norman Stiles, Mel Crawford (Illustrator)
- Weeny Witch by Ida DeLage, Kelly Oechsli (Illustrator)
- A House for Little Red (Modern Curriculum Press Beginning to Read Series) by Margaret Hillert, Kelly Oechsli (Illustrator)
- Mice at Bat by Kelly Oechsli
- The Dragon In The Clock Box by M. Jean Craig, Kelly Oechsli (Illustrator)
- The Birthday Car by Margaret Hillert, Kelly Oechsli (Illustrator)
- In My Garden: A Child's Gardening Book by Helen Oechsli, Kelly Oechsli
- Benny, Benny, Baseball Nut by David A. Adler, Kelly Oechsli (Illustrator)
- The Haunted House by Dorothy Rose, Kelly Oechsli (Illustrator)
- Humpty Dumpty's Holiday Stories by Kelly Oechsli
- Red and the Pumpkins by Jocelyn Stevenson, Kelly Oechsli (Illustrator)
- If I Could, I Would by David R. Collins, Kelly Oechsli
- Too Many Monkeys!: A Counting Rhyme by Kelly Oechsli
- Gobbledy-Gook by Steven Kroll, Kelly Oechsli (Illustrator)
- Playtime In The City by Leland Blair Jacobs, Kelly Oechsli (Illustrator)
- The Monkey's ABC Word Book by Kelly Oechsli
- Space Dog in Trouble by Natalie Standiford (Goodreads Author), Kelly Oechsli (Illustrator)
- Jack Frost and the Magic Paint Brush by Kathy Darling, Kelly Oechsli
- One-Minute Stories of Brothers and Sisters by Shari Lewis, Kelly Oechsli (Illustrator)
- Home Sweet Home by Kelly Oechsli
- Monkey And The Bee by Kelly Oechsli (Illustrator)
- The Monkey And The Bee by Leland Jacobs, Kelly Oechsli (Illustrator)
- Arithmetic in Verse and Rhyme by Allan D Jacobs, Leland B. Jacobs, Kelly Oechsli (Illustrator)
- Humpty Dumpty's Bedtime Stories by Kelly Oechsli
- The Easter Bunny's Secret by Kathy Darling, Kelly Oechsli
- I Wish That I Could Have a Pet by Dorothy Rose, Kelly Oechsli (Illustrator)
- ABC Pigs Go to Market by Ida DeLage, Kelly Oechsli
- Christmas in Britain and Scandinavia by Lillie Patterson, Kelly Oechsli (Illustrator)
- GERMS MAKE ME SICK by Parnell Donahue, Helen Capellaro, Kelly Oechsli (Illustrator)
- Space Dog the Hero by Natalie Standiford (Goodreads Author), Kathleen C. Howell (Illustrator), Kelly Oechsli (Illustrator)
- Peter Bull by Helen Oechsli, Kelly Oechsli
- Everything Changes by Morris H. Philipson, Kelly Oechsli
- Christmas Trick or Treat by Lillie Patterson, Kelly Oechsli
- School by Ellen Rudin, Kelly Oechsli
- Fly Away! by Helen Oechsli, Kelly Oechsli
- Walter the Wolf by Marjorie Weinman Sharmat, Kelly Oechsli
- Hunting of the Snark by Lewis Carroll, Kelly Oechsli
- Peaky Beaky, by Bertrand de Vogüé, Kelly Oechsli
