= Gennifer Choldenko =

American novelist (born 1957)

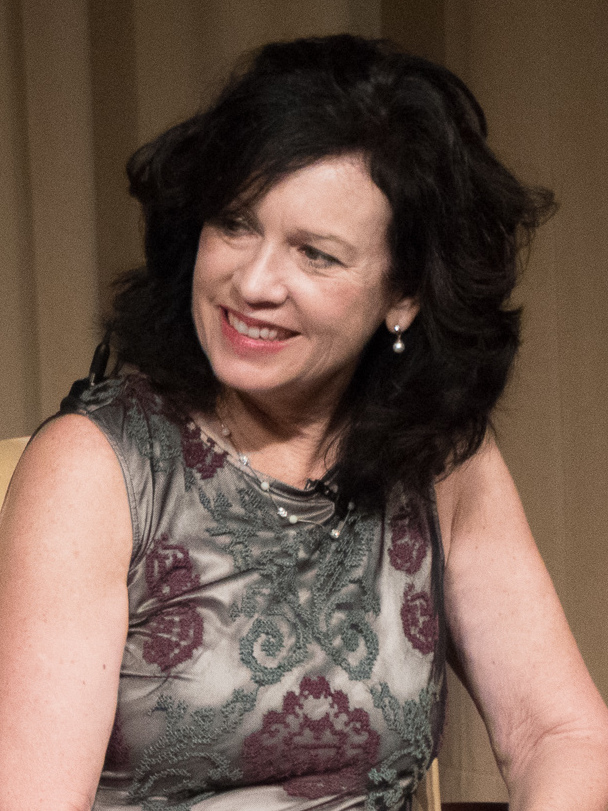
- Choldenko in 2018
- Born: October 20, 1957 (age 68); Santa Monica, California, U.S.
- Education: Brandeis University (BA); Rhode Island School of Design (BFA)
- Occupation: Writer
- Writing career
- Genres: Children's and young adult fiction
- Website: choldenko.com

Gennifer Choldenko (born 1957) is an American writer of popular books for children and adolescents. Her 2006 novel Al Capone Does My Shirts was a finalist for both the British Carnegie Medal and the American Newbery Medal. She earned degrees from Brandeis University and the Rhode Island School of Design.

== Early life and education ==
Choldenko was born in Santa Monica, California on October 20, 1957, the daughter of Jimmy and Ann Johnson. Her father was a business executive, and her mother was a physical therapist. Choldenko was the youngest of four children. She earned a Bachelor of Arts in English and American literature from Brandeis University and a Bachelor of Fine Arts in illustration from the Rhode Island School of Design.

== Career ==
Choldenko published her first book, Moonstruck, with Hyperion in 1997. She has since published over a dozen books for children, including picture books and middle-grade novels.

Choldenko's books have received multiple honors. Twelve of her books are Junior Library Guild selections: Moonstruck (1997), Notes from a Liar and Her Dog (2001), Al Capone Does My Shirts (2004), Al Capone Shines My Shoes (2009), Al Capone Does My Homework (2013), Dad and the Dinosaur (2017), Al Capone Throws Me a Curve (2018), One-Third Nerd (2019), Dogtown (2023), Mouse and His Dog (2024), and The Tenth Mistake of Hank Hooperman (2024).

In 2005, her middle grade novel Al Capone Does My Shirts was a finalist for both the British Carnegie Medal and the American Newbery Medal (Newbery Honor Book). That year, the Association for Library Service to Children (ALSC) included it on their annual list of Notable Children’s Books, and the Young Adult Library Services Association included it on their list of the Best Books for Young Adults. In 2019, Booklist included it on their list of the "50 Best Middle-Grade Novels of the 21st Century".

In 2008, the ALSC included the audiobook of If a Tree Falls at Lunch Period, read by Ariadne Meyers and Francois Battiste, on their annual list of Notable Children’s Recordings.

In 2010, Al Capone Shines My Shoes won the NCIBA Book of the Year Award for Children's Literature.

In 2024, The Tenth Mistake of Hank Hooperman won the CALIBA Golden Poppy Award for Middle Grade Literature.

== Personal life ==
Choldenko is married to Jacob Brown.

== Works ==
=== Picture books ===
- Moonstruck: The True Story of the Cow Who Jumped over the Moon, illustrated by Paul Yalowitz, Hyperion, 1997.
- How to Make Friends with a Giant, illustrated by Amy Walrod, Putnam, 2006.
- Louder, Lili, illustrated by S. D. Schindler, Putnam, 2007.
- A Giant Crush, illustrated by Melissa Sweet, Putnam, 2011.
- Putting the Monkeys to Bed, illustrated by Jack E. Davis, Putnam, 2015.
- Dad and the Dinosaur, illustrated by Dan Santat, Putnam, 2017.

=== Children's books ===
==== Standalone books ====
- Notes from a Liar and Her Dog, Putnam, 2001.
- If a Tree Falls at Lunch Period, Harcourt, 2007.
- No Passengers Beyond This Point, Puffin, 2011.
- Chasing Secrets, Wendy Lamb Books, 2015.
- One-Third Nerd, Penguin Random House, 2019.
- Orphan Eleven, Wendy Lamb, 2020.
- The Tenth Mistake of Hank Hooperman, Knopf, 2024.

==== Dogtown books ====
- Dogtown, with Katherine Applegate; illustrated by Wallace West; Feiwel & Friends, 2023.
- Mouse and His Dog, with Katherine Applegate; illustrated by Wallace West; Feiwel & Friends, 2024.
- I Am a Good Dog, with Katherine Applegate; illustrated by Wallace West; Feiwel & Friends, 2026.

==== Tales from Alcatraz books ====
- Al Capone Does My Shirts, Putnam's, 2004.
- Al Capone Shines My Shoes, Dial, 2009.
- Al Capone Does My Homework, Dial, 2013.
- Al Capone Throws Me a Curve, Wendy Lamb, 2018.
