= Janell Cannon =

American children's author and illustrator

- Born: St. Paul, Minnesota, U.S.
- Education: Burnsville High School (1975)
- Occupations: Writer, Illustrator
- Notable work: Stellaluna (1993)

Janell Cannon is an American children's author and illustrator. Her first book, Stellaluna (1993), about a baby fruit bat, has been included in the National Education Association and School Library Journal's list of 100 best children's books of all time. Stellaluna has been translated into 30 languages.

== Early life and education ==
Cannon was born in St. Paul, Minnesota, the daughter of Burton H. and Nancy A. Cannon. In sixth grade she began painting with acrylics. She attended Burnsville High School, and graduated in 1975.

== Career ==
After high school she moved west and settled in Southern California. From 1981 to 1993 she was a graphic artist for the Carlsbad public library.

== Works ==
- Stellaluna (first Harcourt (San Diego, CA), 1993), in several editions ISBN 0-15-280217-7, ISBN 0-15-200812-8, ISBN 0-15-200286-3, ISBN 0-590-48379-X, ISBN 0-15-201530-2
- Trupp: A Fuzzhead Tale, Harcourt (San Diego, CA), 1995.
- Verdi, Harcourt (San Diego, CA), 1997.
- Crickwing, Harcourt (San Diego, CA), 2000.
- Little Yau: A Fuzzhead Tale, Harcourt (San Diego, CA), 2002.
- Pinduli, Harcourt (San Diego, CA), 2004.

== Reviews ==
- Booklist, April 15, 1995, Carolyn Phelan, review of Trupp: A Fuzzhead Tale, p. 1505; April 15, 1997, Susan Dove Lempke, review of Verdi, p. 1434; October 15, 2000, Connie Fletcher, review of Crickwing, p. 434.
- Kirkus Reviews, April 1, 1997, review of Verdi, p. 551.
- Publishers Weekly, April 26, 1993, review of Stellaluna, p. 78; February 20, 1995, review of Trupp, p. 204; April 24, 1995, "Queen of the Night," p. 19; February 17, 1997, review of Verdi, p. 219; May 1, 2000, "Going Batty for Stellaluna, " p. 27; August 7, 2000, review of Crickwing, p. 95.
- School Library Journal, June, 1993, Marianne Saccardi, review of Stellaluna, p. 70; July, 1995, Virginia Opocensky, review of Trupp, p. 55; May, 1997, Nina Lindsay, review of Verdi, p. 93; November, 2000, Barbara Buckley, review of Crickwing, p. 110.
