= Dust City =

Young adult fantasy novel by Robert Paul Weston

- Author: Robert Paul Weston
- Language: English
- Genre: Fantasy, Young adult
- Publication date: September 30, 2010
- Publication place: Canada
- Pages: 299
- ISBN: 9781595142962
- OCLC: 637439063
- Dewey Decimal: 820

Dust City is a young adult fantasy novel by Robert Paul Weston, published in 2010. It is based upon fairy tales.

== Synopsis ==
After escaping from a juvenile detention centre, Henry Whelp, the Big Bad Wolf's son, investigates the role a corporation that manufactures synthetic fairy dust had in the crime of his father, and what happened to the fairies that once protected humans and animals.

== Reception ==
Bookyurt said "First off, Dust City has a truly authentic, pulpy Noir feel..." Quill & Quire said this about the book. "The book succeeds on nearly every level." RTReviews said this about Dust City "This fractured fairy tale will satisfy those looking for an unusual paranormal read."

== Awards ==
- Canadian Library Association Honour (2011)
