= Christine Heppermann =

American author

Christine Heppermann is an American author who specializes in poetry and books for children and young adults. She has also written many critical articles and book reviews for leading publications. As an author, she has been largely collected by libraries.

== Early life and education ==
Heppermann grew up in Omaha, Nebraska. She attended Catholic school, graduating from an all-girls high school before attending college at Trinity University in San Antonio, Texas. Her education also includes a master's degree in children's literature from Simmons College in Boston, Massachusetts, and an MFA in writing for children and young adults from Hamline University in Saint Paul, Minnesota.

== Career ==
While living in Minneapolis, Minnesota, Heppermann was involved in the Twin Cities literary scene. She contributed articles to the Hungry Mind Review and served on the editorial board of The Five Owls Review and The Riverbank Review.

Heppermann was a columnist and reviewer for The Horn Book Magazine from 1996 until 2013. She wrote on topics ranging from a survey of sex education books to a discussion of whether children's book reviewers were critical enough.

Heppermann's first book, City Chickens, is the true story of Chicken Run Rescue, a shelter for abandoned and unwanted fowl located in Minneapolis, Minnesota.

Heppermann's second book, Poisoned Apples: Poems for You, My Pretty, is a collection of poetry for young adults. The book was well received, getting five starred reviews from children's literature review publications and appearing on many "best books of 2014" lists including Publishers Weekly and The Boston Globe.

Heppermann's third book, Ask Me How I Got Here, is a novel-in-verse for young adults. The book's main character, Addie, is a high-school cross country runner who experiences an unplanned pregnancy. Many of the poems contain evocative religious imagery that highlight Addie's emotional and spiritual development. The book received starred reviews from several children's literature review publications.

Heppermann is also co-author, with Ron Koertge, of The Backyard Witch series for young readers.

Heppermann's poetry has been published in 5AM, The Magazine of Contemporary Poetry; Poems and Plays; Nerve Cowboy; and The Mas Tequila Review.
