= Heat (Lupica novel) =

2006 young adult novel by Mike Lupica

- Author: Mike Lupica
- Language: English
- Genre: Sports novel
- Publisher: Philomel Books
- Publication date: 2006
- Publication place: United States
- Media type: Print (Hardcover and Paperback)
- Pages: 220 pp (first edition, paperback)
- ISBN: 0-399-24301-1 (first edition, paperback)

Heat is a 2006 young adult novel written by Mike Lupica.

== Summary ==
The book is set in the Bronx, New York. The main character is a young boy named Michael Arroyo, a gifted baseball player/pitcher. Coaches from other teams say that he is too good to be just 12 years old (He can pitch a ball at 80 mph). With no parents, and a birth certificate back at his native home Cuba, Michael will have to somehow prove with the help of his best friend, Manny, and his brother Carlos that he really is the age that he says. Later on in the book, Michael also meets a girl named Ellie who is beautiful and mysterious. Also, he has to lie to everyone else that his father is still alive otherwise he will be possibly separated from his brother. His brother is a couple of months from reaching 18 years old, making him almost able to legally take care of his brother. His father died a few months before the plot of the story. He was a great man and encouraged Michael to do his best in everything and helped him a lot in baseball. He died from a heart attack after defending a woman who he drove to her home in his taxi cab who was attacked by her boyfriend. He was hit several times in the chest. He made it to a friend's house and died. His last words were, "Keep my boys together." In the middle of the book, he is removed from his baseball team due to the fact that he has no birth certificate on file. He watches a Yankee Baseball game on TV and is shocked to find out that Ellie is the daughter of the Yankee's star pitcher. He is sitting on the sidelines of a game when Ellie and her father show up with his birth certificate and he is allowed to finish the game. Soon they all go to Yankee Stadium to make Michael's dream come true.

== Film adaptation ==
In April 2021, it was announced that Netflix will adapt the novel into a feature film.
