= Mr. Lincoln's Way =

2001 children's book by Patricia Polacco

- First edition cover
- Author: Patricia Polacco
- Publisher: Philomel Books
- Publication date: August 27, 2001
- ISBN: 9780399237546

Mr. Lincoln’s Way is a 2001 children’s book by Patricia Polacco. It was published by Philomel Books in New York, NY. This book deals with the issue of racism and can be used as a tool to introduce diversity and tolerance in a classroom setting. It tells the story of a principal of an elementary school, Mr. Lincoln, helping the school bully overcome his feelings of hatred. Polacco did all of the watercolor illustrations.

== Plot summary ==
Mr. Lincoln is the principal of an elementary school and is admired by all of the students, except one. Eugene “Mean Gene” Esterhouse terrorizes other students on the playground and says offensive remarks. He then invites Eugene into his office and gives him a book about different types of birds. Eugene tells Mr. Lincoln that his grandpa taught him a lot about birds when he lived on his grandpa’s farm. Mr. Lincoln decides to create a bird atrium at the school to help Eugene change his behavior. The atrium attracts all different kinds of birds, and Eugene is fascinated by all of them. Eugene took the bird book with him everywhere and began to be nicer to the other students.

A couple of days later, a teacher reports to Mr. Lincoln that Eugene had made racial comments to two students in the lunch line. Mr. Lincoln calls Eugene into his office, where he learns that Eugene’s dad was mad that Eugene had been spending so much time with Mr. Lincoln because he’s African American. Mr. Lincoln shows Eugene that he cares for all of the birds the same, regardless of color, and Eugene promises to never use racist comments again.

A couple of days later, the mallard eggs in the atrium begin to hatch. The ducks need to live near the pond, so Mr. Lincoln and Eugene come up with a plan and start to lure them to the river. After the ducks make it to the water safely, Eugene hears his name. His grandpa had come to see the ducks make it to safety. Eugene asks his grandpa if he can live with him again, to which grandpa replies, “We’ll see, son. We’ll sure see.”

== Characters ==
Mr. Lincoln – Mr. Lincoln is an African American principal of the elementary school. All of the students really admire him, except for Eugene. He teaches Eugene about different kinds of birds and teaches him not to terrorize the other students and not to use racial comments.

Eugene “Mean Gene” Esterhouse – Eugene terrorizes his peers on the playground. He gets in fights and calls the other students mean or racial names. He becomes fascinated by birds after he visits with his grandpa.

Grampa - Eugene loves his grandpa and wants to visit him again. Grampa was the one who got Eugene interested in birds.

Eugene’s Dad – Eugene’s dad becomes angry when Eugene begins spending a lot of time with Mr. Lincoln because he is not of the same race. He is an intolerant and uses racial slurs for anyone who is not of the same race he is.

== Reviews ==
According to the publisher of the book, Philomel Books, “With Patricia Polacco's trademark illustrations and gentle text, Mr. Lincoln's Way celebrates the unforgettable school principal who touches the lives of his students and truly empowers them.”

According to Booklist, “This story is vintage Polacco--a multicultural neighborhood setting, a cast of believable characters (some larger than life), and a satisfying ending guaranteed to bring tears to even hard-boiled cynics. Polacco's signature watercolor illustrations take on springtime hues here; they're especially apparent in Mr. Lincoln's bright pink shirts and ties. An excellent choice for storyhours, this should prompt some interesting discussions about bullies and their motivations.”

According to The Horn Book Magazine, “Although the illustrations are engaging, the story of the bully's transformation is both sanctimonious and unconvincing. Eugene is too self-aware for his age, and Mr. Lincoln is too flawless to be interesting.”

== Inspiration ==
Patricia Polacco uses many of the schools she travels to as inspiration for the schools in her stories. The elementary school in Mr. Lincoln’s Way is based around Murphy Elementary School in Haslett, Michigan. This school is home to mallard duck nests, and every year the principal leads the ducks through the school to the local pond.
