= Two-Minute Drill =

2007 novel by Mike Lupica

- First edition
- Author: Mike Lupica
- Language: English
- Series: Comeback Kids
- Subject: Football
- Genre: Children's fiction
- Publisher: Philomel Books
- Publication date: Sep 2007
- Publication place: United States
- Media type: Print, e-book, audiobook
- ISBN: 0399247157
- Followed by: Hot Hand!

Two-Minute Drill is a 2007 children's book by Mike Lupica and the first book in his Comeback Kids series.

== Synopsis ==
Scott Parry is not only the new kid, but he's also the clumsiest and smartest kid in school. Chris Conlan is the school's golden boy and the quarterback of the football team. Scott joins the football team, which causes him to cross paths with Chris. Initially the two seem like the unlikeliest pairing in the world, but a shared secret pulls them together.

== Reception ==
Two-Minute Drill received reviews from the Horn Book Guide, School Library Journal, and Kirkus Reviews.
