= Patricia Polacco =

American writer and illustrator (born 1944)

- Born: July 11, 1944 (age 82); Lansing, Michigan, U.S.
- Occupations: Author, illustrator, Storyteller

Patricia Barber Polacco (born July 11, 1944) is an American author and illustrator. Throughout her school years, Polacco struggled to learn to read but found relief by expressing herself through art. Polacco endured teasing and hid her disability until a school teacher recognized she could not read and began to help her. Her book Thank You, Mr. Falker is Polacco's retelling of this encounter and its outcome. She also wrote such books as Mr. Lincoln's Way and The Lemonade Club.

== Biography ==
Polacco was born Patricia Barber on July 11, 1944, in Lansing, Michigan, the daughter of a teacher and a salesman turned talk show host. She lived in Williamston, Michigan until the age of three, when her parents divorced and she moved with her mother and brother to her maternal grandmother's farm in Union City, Michigan. Many of Polacco's stories are influenced by this farm and the folklore she heard from her Russian grandmother (referred to as "Babushka" in her books), who died in 1949 when Polacco was five years old. During the summers, Polacco lived with her father and his Irish parents. "In both households I had these amazing storytellers," she said. The family did not have a television and Polacco said on NPR, "our evenings were spent listening to glorious tales being told by the grandparents." Polacco did not learn to read until she was nearly fourteen and struggled greatly in school. Finally, in junior high school, one of her teachers finally realized that she had dyslexia. The book Pink and Say comes from the life of a great-great-grandfather on her father's side, Sheldon Russell Curtis, who fought in the American Civil War and developed a moving friendship with a Black soldier named Pinkus Aylee.

In 1949, following the death of Polacco's maternal grandmother, her family moved to Coral Gables for three years and then the Rockridge district of Oakland, California. She attended Oakland Technical High School, where she became friends with Frank Oz. At institutions in the United States and Australia, she earned a Master's and PhD in art history. Upon graduating, she worked as a restoration specialist in art museums. At the age of 41, Polacco began working on her first children's book. Polacco's mother was so confident in the books that she gave Polacco money to travel to Manhattan and set up meetings with publishers. During a week-long trip to New York, Polacco attended sixteen meetings where she showed seven or eight of her books. By the end of the week, all her books had sold.

Polacco resides in Union City, Michigan. Polacco has two children, Traci and Steven. Her marriage to Graeme L Blackman ended in divorce and she married chef and cooking instructor Enzo Mario Polacco on August 18, 1979. Polacco has been an outspoken critic of the No Child Left Behind Act due to its reliance on high-stakes testing.

== Publications ==
- Lillian Two Blossom (1988) ISBN 0-399-21470-4
- The Keeping Quilt (1988) ISBN 0-689-82090-9
- Rechenka's Eggs (1988) ISBN 0399215018
- Meteor! (1987) ISBN 0-399-21699-5
- Uncle Vova's Tree (1989) ISBN 0-399-21617-0
- Babushka's Doll (1990) ISBN 0-671-68343-8
- Just Plain Fancy (1990) ISBN 0-553-05884-3
- Thunder Cake (1990) ISBN 0-399-22231-6
- Appelemando's Dreams (1991) ISBN 0-399-21800-9
- Dream Keeper (1991) ISBN 0-399-22947-7
- Some Birthday! (1991) ISBN 0-671-72750-8
- Chicken Sunday (1992) ISBN 0-399-22133-6
- Mrs. Katz and Tush (1992) ISBN 0-440-40936-5
- Picnic at Mudsock Meadow (1992) ISBN 0-399-21811-4
- Babushka Baba Yaga (1993) ISBN 0-399-22531-5
- The Bee Tree (1993) ISBN 0-399-21965-X
- Firetalking (1994) ISBN 1-878450-55-7
- My Rotten Redheaded Older Brother (1994) ISBN 0-671-72751-6
- Pink and Say (1994) ISBN 0-399-22671-0
- Tikvah Means Hope (1994) ISBN 0-385-32059-0
- Babushka's Mother Goose (1995) ISBN 0-399-22747-4
- My Ol' Man (1995) ISBN 0-399-22822-5
- Aunt Chip And The Great Triple Creek Dam Affair (1996) ISBN 0-399-22943-4
- I Can Hear The Sun: A Modern Myth (1996) ISBN 0-399-22520-X
- The Trees of the Dancing Goats (1996) ISBN 0-689-80862-3
- Casey at the Bat: A Ballad of the Republic Sung in the Year 1888 (1997) ISBN 0-698-11557-0; Author: Ernest Lawrence Thayer, Illustrator: Patricia Polacco
- In Enzo's Splendid Gardens (1997) ISBN 0-399-23107-2
- Mrs. Mack (1998) ISBN 0-399-23167-6
- Thank You, Mr. Falker (1998) ISBN 0-399-23166-8
- Luba And The Wren (1999) ISBN 0-399-23168-4
- Welcome Comfort (1999) ISBN 0-399-23169-2
- The Butterfly (2000) ISBN 0-399-23170-6
- Betty Doll (2001) ISBN 0-399-23638-4
- Gracias, Sr. Falker (2001) ISBN 1-930332-03-3, with Teresa Mlawer
- Mr. Lincoln's Way (2001) ISBN 0-399-23754-2
- Christmas Tapestry (2002) ISBN 0-399-23955-3
- When Lightning Comes In A Jar (2002) ISBN 0-399-23164-1
- G is for Goat (2003) ISBN 0-399-24018-7
- The Graves Family (2003) ISBN 0-399-24034-9
- John Philip Duck (2004) ISBN 0-399-24262-7
- Oh, Look! (2004) ISBN 0-399-24223-6
- An Orange for Frankie (2004) ISBN 0-399-24302-X
- Emma Kate (2005) ISBN 0-399-24452-2
- The Graves Family Goes Camping (2005) ISBN 0-399-24369-0
- Mommies Say Shhh (2005) ISBN 0-399-24341-0
- Rotten Richie and the Ultimate Dare (2006) ISBN 0-399-24531-6
- Ginger and Petunia (2006) ISBN 9780399245398
- Something About Hensley's (2006) ISBN 0-399-24538-3
- The Lemonade Club (2007) ISBN 9780399245404
- For the Love of Autumn (2008) ISBN 9780399245411
- Someone for Mr. Sussman (2008) ISBN 9780399250750
- In Our Mothers' House (2009) ISBN 0-399-25076-X
- January's Sparrow (2009) ISBN 978-0-399-25077-4
- Junkyard Wonders (2010) ISBN 0-399-25078-6
- Just in Time, Abraham Lincoln (2011) ISBN 9780399254710
- Bun Bun Button (2011) ISBN 9780399254727
- The Art of Miss Chew (2012) ISBN 9780399257032
- Bully (2012) ISBN 9780399257049
- Gifts of the Heart (2013) ISBN 9780399160943
- The Blessing Cup (2013) ISBN 1442450479
- Clara and Davie (2014) ISBN 9780545354776
- Mr. Wayne's Masterpiece (2014) ISBN 9780399160950
- Tucky Jo and Little Heart (2015) ISBN 9781481415842
- An A From Miss Keller (2015) ISBN 9780399166914
- Fiona's Lace (2014) ISBN 9781442487246
- The Mermaid's Purse (2016) ISBN 9780399166921
- Because of Thursday (2016) ISBN 9781481421409
- Remembering Vera (2017) ISBN 9781481442275
- Holes in the Sky (2018) ISBN 9781524739485
- The Bravest Man in the World (2019) ISBN 9781481494618
- Sticks and Stones (2020) ISBN 9781534426221
- Go Ask Ozzie (2021) ISBN 9781534478558
- Palace of Books (2023) ISBN 9781534451315
- Sea of Gold (2024) ISBN 9781665938426

== Literary awards ==
- 1988 Sydney Taylor Book Award for The Keeping Quilt
- 1989 International Reading Association Award for Rechenka's Eggs
- March 10, 1990 Santa Clara Reading Council
- Author's Hall of Fame
- Commonwealth Club of California Recognition of Excellence for
  - 1990 Babushka's Doll
  - 1992 Chicken Sunday (Nov. 14th 1992 declared Chicken Sunday)
- 1992 Society of Children's Book Writers and Illustrators
- Golden Kite Award for Illustration for Chicken Sunday
- 1992 Boston Area Educators for Social Responsibility
- Children's Literature and Social Responsibility Award
- Nov. 9th 1993 Jane Adams Peace Assoc. and Women's Intl. League for Peace and Freedom Awards
- Honor Award for Mrs. Katz and Tush for its effective contribution to peace and social justice.
- Parent's Choice Honors
  - 1991 Some Birthday
  - 1997 Video/Dream Keeper
  - 1998 Thank You, Mr. Falker
- 1996 North Dakota Library Association Children's Book Award for My Rotten Red Headed Older Brother
- 1996 Jo Osborne Award for Humor in Children's Literature
- 1997 Missouri Association of School Librarians
- Show Me Readers Award for My Rotten Red Headed Older Brother
- 1997 West Virginia Children's Book Award for Pink and Say
- 1998 Mid-South Independent Booksellers for Children Humpty Dumpty Award
- 2014 Sydney Taylor Book Award for The Blessing Cup

== Articles written about Polacco ==
- Vandergrift, Kay E. "Peacocks, Dreams, Quilts, and Honey: Patricia Polacco, A Woman's Voice of Remembrance," In Ways of Knowing: Literature and the Intellectual Life of Children. Ed. By Kay E. Vandergrift. Lanham, MD: Scarecrow Press, 1996, pp. 259–288.
- Vandergrift, Kay E. "Patricia Polacco," in Twentieth-Century Children's Writers. ed. by Laura Berger. 4th ed. Detroit: St. James, 1995. 759–760.
- Profile, childrenslit.com; accessed on July 8, 2015.
- Interview, TimeforKids.com; accessed on July 8, 2015.
