= Phyllis Green =

Artist

- Born: Minneapolis, Minnesota, U.S.
- Education: University of California Los Angeles, University of Manitoba
- Known for: Sculpture, ceramics, installation art, video, performance
- Spouse: Ave Pildas
- Awards: Guggenheim Fellowship, Pollock-Krasner Foundation, National Endowment for the Arts, Canada Council
- Website: Phyllis Green

Phyllis Green is an artist and educator based in the Los Angeles area. She has largely focused on sculpture using a wide range of materials and fabrication techniques to explore objects and their social context, gender politics, consumerism and spirituality, but has also produced video, installation and performance art. Critics characterize her work by its craft and engagement with surface appearance, diverse sources, unconventional juxtapositions, and grounding in the female body and metaphorical content. Her early work grew out of 1970s feminism and consciousness-raising, while her later work has taken inspiration from the Vedanta branch of Hindu spirituality. In 2018, Sculpture critic Kay Whitney wrote, "Green's polymorphously perverse and experimental thinking counters art historical assumptions regarding gender and culture, while her pun-making glittering and whimsical imagery acts as a shadow-screen for the serious and profound."

Green has received a Guggenheim Fellowship and grants from the Pollock-Krasner Foundation, National Endowment for the Arts and Canada Council, among others. Her work belongs to museums including the Los Angeles County Museum of Art (LACMA), Long Beach Museum of Art and Winnipeg Art Gallery.

Green is based in Santa Monica and is married to the photographer Ave Pildas.

Phyllis Green, Infanta Margarita, ceramic, fabric and mixed media, 9" x 47" x 16", 1994–98.

== Life and career ==
Green was born in Minneapolis, Minnesota but grew up in Winnipeg, Canada. She attended the University of Manitoba, where she earned a BA in English in 1971. After a move to Vancouver, she turned to art, spurred by the influence of feminism. Her 1975 work, Boob Tree, took on iconic status when it was selected as the catalog-cover and poster image for the all-women exhibition "Woman as Viewer" at the Winnipeg Art Gallery. The primal, comical sculpture consisted of a palm tree-style trunk topped with pink breasts crocheted in yarn over plastic armatures; it embodied feminist practices of provocatively reclaiming female anatomy and parodying over-serious masculine sculpture with pop-inflected soft forms and "women's" crafts. Thirty-six years later, Green restored Boob Tree for the show "Winter Kept Us Warm" (2012, Plug In ICA, Winnipeg).

In 1978, Green moved to California to pursue graduate studies at the University of California Los Angeles, studying ceramics with Adrian Saxe and earning an MFA in 1981. She subsequently received early recognition for a solo show at Artspace (1982) and groups exhibitions at the Downey Museum of Art, Laguna Art Museum and Los Angeles Municipal Art Gallery.

Since then, Green has had solo exhibitions at Jan Baum Gallery (1988–94), LASCA Gallery (1996), Lemon Sky Projects (1998), Vielmetter Los Angeles (2003), Los Angeles Central Library (2013), LAM Gallery (2015) and Chimento Contemporary (2017, 2019), as well as several university galleries. In 2011, a survey titled "Splendid Entities: 25 Years of Objects by Phyllis Green" opened at the Ben Maltz Gallery at Otis College of Art and Design. Green has also appeared in the Los Angeles County Art Museum shows "From Head To Toe: Concepts of the Body in 20th Century Art" (1998) and "Made in California: Art, Image and Identity" (2000) and group shows at the Museum of Contemporary Art Shanghai, Long Beach Museum of Art, the Getty Center, Tucson Museum of Art, Hammer Museum and Craft Contemporary.

== Work and reception ==
=== Artwork (1986–2013) ===
Green's work in the 1980s focused on small freestanding sculpture and wall-reliefs that were spare in materials and coloration and concise in terms of formal vocabulary. Her "Sticks and Bones" series (1986–92) featured elegantly choreographed, industrially transformed branch and bone configurations whose textures and tonalities merged the fabricated and organic. A 1989 Art In America review described the series as achieving a "balletic linearity" that evoked human kinetics (e.g., dance, wrestling, flight) and provoked anthropomorphic predilections.

In the early 1990s, Green returned to concerns involving domesticity, "women's" craft techniques, and reference to the female body in playful work that blended ostentatious decoration, baroque sight gags and lavish materials. She received substantial recognition for her "Turkish Bath" series (1993–98), which was inspired by the 1862 Jean-Auguste-Dominique Ingres painting of the same name. The series consisted of eccentric, exotic objects placed on overstuffed pillows and silk-swathed pedestals (e.g., Infanta Margarita, 1994–98) that Los Angeles Times critic Susan Kandel wrote, distilled things— exoticism, animal magnetism, forbidden pleasure, post-coital bliss—"into sculptural essences" that were "both hyperbolic and irresistible [and] as perverse and as concentrated as good perfume." Art historian Jeanne Willette contrasted Ingres's display of abundant female flesh for male consumption with Green's feminist approach, which "sought to redeem femininity by addressing issues of decoration and ornament."

Green's sculpture in the 2000s continued to employ unorthodox juxtapositions of materials, techniques, pop, historical and fashion references, and pointed messages about gender, the female body and consumerism. L12 (Duchamp Party) (2001) was a scaled-up replica of Duchamp's Bottle Rack readymade equipped with clear acrylic-disc platforms bearing a dozen cast ceramic sculptures of a popular 1960s hairdo; it poked fun at gendered aspects of Duchamp's work and tat male-dominated minimalism. The ceramic hairdos reappeared in Green's show, "Amelia and the Spinning Heads" (2003, Vielmetter Los Angeles), which addressed the mystery of Amelia Earhart's disappearance, and more broadly, sought the recuperation of consummate feminine ideals; it included three silver spinning "Amelia" heads (depictions of her tousled hairstyle), an animated film incorporating them, other iconic "hairdo" sculptures, and garments.

An Artillery review of Green's 2011 survey exhibition recognized the collected hybrid and mixed-media works (including the "Odd Old Things" series, 2008–10) for their intentionally mismatched materials, meaningful contradictions and "risk-taking and originality."

=== Vedanta-related work ===
Phyllis Green, Five Sheaths, cotton fabric and wood, garments hung on wooden hanger; installation width 144”, each garment 78” tall; 2017.

In 2014, Green began producing objects and performative devices that were influenced by her association with the Christopher Isherwood Foundation and the writer's immersion in spiritual philosophy, Vedanta. These pieces combined pop culture with Vedic-influenced imagery and parables as a metaphor for maintaining spiritual aspirations with humor amid the challenges of contemporary life.

Green's exhibition "Walking the Walk" (2015, LAM Gallery) featured tongue-in-cheek works based on a passage recommending that a disciple approach a guru "with wood on your head" (i.e., fuel as an offering); among them was Coco Carrier, a stylish "hat" from which a miniature forest of branches rose. She also created a series of "high-design, full-body walkers" she could enter and wheel around in, each equipped with a unique cloak, accessories and a moveable pedestal carrying stacks of wood or white porcelain surrogates.

The show "Life After Life After Life" (2017, Chimento Contemporary) offered a similar approach with works such as Tree and Birds (2017)—a part-sculpture, part-costume work with a bird crowning the top like a hat; it referenced a Vedic text describing a tree surrounded by fluttering, ascending birds. Five Sheaths consisted of five cape-like garments hanging from the ceiling on branch-like hooks, which referenced fashion, the Hindu notion of five layers of being and the proverb that "we change lives like we change clothes"; conceptually, it conflated reincarnation with the dizzying mix of roles faced by contemporary women. Like her earlier "walkers," the objects were accompanied by a photograph of Green modelling the entire set that suggested an ironic "enlightenment fashion shoot."

== Teaching and other professional activities ==
Green taught art for over twenty-five years, most notably at Loyola Marymount University (1989–2011), University of California Los Angeles (1996 t0 2008), and University of Southern California (2002 to 2015). She also taught for shorter periods at Emily Carr College of Art, Claremont Graduate University, Glendale Community College and California State University-Fullerton.

Green was chair of the Public Art Committee of the City of Santa Monica from 2002 to 2004 and was appointed to the Santa Monica Arts Commission in 2000, serving as its chair from 2006 to 2008. She was a founding board member of the Christopher Isherwood Foundation and served as its deputy director from 2011 to 2018. From 1996 to 1998, she hosted the radio show "LOOK/ hear" on KXLU 88.9 FM in Los Angeles.

== Recognition ==
Green has received a Guggenheim Fellowship (2014), as well as grants from the City of Santa Monica, California Community Foundation, Durfee Foundation, Pollock-Krasner Foundation, California Arts Council, National Endowment for the Arts, Canada Council and British Columbia Cultural Fund.

Her work belongs to the Aldrich Collection, Ceramics Research Center, (Arizona State University), Department of Cultural Affairs City of Los Angeles, Long Beach Museum of Art, Los Angeles County Museum of Art, Salk Collection and Winnipeg Art Gallery, among other art collections.
