= Ellen Levine =

American media executive (1943–2022)

Ellen Levine (born Ellen Rose Jacobson) (February 19, 1943 – November 6, 2022) was an American media executive. From 2006 to 2016, she served as the Editorial Director of Hearst Magazines, and served as a consultant to Hearst from January 2017. She was responsible for the launches of numerous successful magazines, including O: The Oprah Magazine and Food Network Magazine.

== Education ==
Levine was a graduate of Wellesley College. At Wellesley, Levine studied political science and was heavily involved with The Wellesley News, the college's student-produced newspaper. In 2005, Wellesley honored Levine with the Alumnae Achievement Award, the highest distinction possible for an alumna.

== Career ==
After graduating from Wellesley, Levine began her career in journalism at the Record in Hackensack, New Jersey. In 1994, Levine was named the first female editor-in-chief of Good Housekeeping magazine. In 2003, she was awarded the inaugural Media Award by the American College of Neuropsychopharmacology (ACNP) for her thoughtful inclusion of mental illness discussions in Good Housekeeping. While at Good Housekeeping, Levine also helped launch additional magazines under the Hearst banner, such as O, The Oprah Magazine and Food Network Magazine. From 1976 to 1982, she was a senior editor at Cosmopolitan. Levine served as editor-in-chief of Woman's Day from 1982 to 1990, and as editor-in-chief of Redbook from 1990 to 1994.

Levine was President of the American Society of Magazine Editors from 1994 to 1996 and a member of the U.S. Attorney General's Commission on Pornography. For her work on the Commission, the Atlantic Coast Independent Distributors honored Levine for outstanding defense of the First Amendment.

== Personal life ==
Levine and her husband Richard had two sons and resided in New York.
