= I Need My Monster =

2009 picture book by Amanda Noll

- First edition cover
- Author: Amanda Noll
- Illustrator: Howard McWilliam
- Language: English
- Genre: Picture book
- Publisher: Flashlight Press
- Publication date: 2009
- Publication place: United States of America
- Media type: Print
- ISBN: 0979974623
- OCLC: 828197787
- Followed by: Hey, That's MY Monster!

I Need My Monster is a picture book written by Amanda Noll, illustrated by Howard McWilliam, and published by Flashlight Press. Since its publication in 2009, I Need My Monster has been translated into Korean, German, Hebrew, Ukrainian, and Chinese. Scholastic Book Club has published a paperback edition.

In 2013, Pony Tale produced an interactive I Need My Monster app.

In 2014, Storyline Online (the SAG-AFTRA Foundation's award-winning children's literacy website) filmed Rita Moreno of West Side Story fame reading I Need My Monster.

== Synopsis ==
Ethan is used to sleeping with his favorite monster under his bed. One night, checking under the bed, he finds a note instead:

"Gone fishing. Back in a week. –Gabe"

Ethan finds other monsters who appear under the bed, but none are just like the one that helps him sleep. He wants his own monster back.

== Sequel ==
A sequel, Hey, That's MY Monster!, was published in 2010. In this book, Ethan tries to find a monster scary enough to keep his little sister in bed until she falls asleep.

In 2017, Storyline Online (the SAG-AFTRA Foundation's award-winning children's literacy website) filmed Lily Tomlin reading Hey, That's MY Monster!

In 2019, Flashlight Press published a board book companion for babies and toddlers, "This board book for 0-3 year old listeners, presents the little monster-loving boy from I Need My Monster and Hey, That's MY Monster!, as he tries to find the monster that matches his drawing. He describes his monster (green, long tail, pointy nails, big teeth), and then looks for these features in an assortment of amusing monsters until he finds the perfect match, which turns out to be his beloved stuffed monster toy."

A prequel to I Need My Monster, titled How I Met My Monster, was released on November 1, 2019.

== Awards and honors ==
I Need My Monster is the winner of five state awards:

- Alabama Camellia Award (2010–11),
- Arizona Grand Canyon Reader Award (2011),
- California Young Readers Medal (2011–12),
- Georgia Picture Storybook Award (2011–12), and the
- Nevada Young Reader Award (2011–12)

In addition, I Need My Monster was listed on the following national award lists:

- Mississippi Magnolia Children's Choice Award list (2012–13),
- Nebraska Golden Sower Award (2011–12) 2nd-place,
- South Dakota Prairie Bud Award (2011–12) 3rd-place
- Virginia Reader's Choice Award Primary list (2012–13)
- Washington Children's Choice Book Award (2010-2011) 2nd-place
- Wyoming Buckaroo Award (2011–12) 2nd runner-up,
- Iowa Regional Goldfinch Award (2009–10) winner,
- Storytelling World Award Honor Book (2010),
- Indie Next Kids' Pick (Summer 2009),
- NSW Premier Reading Challenge Book in Australia, and
- Scholastic Book Club Selection

== Critical reception ==
I Need My Monster has generally received positive reviews from critics. Booklist stated, "The entire effort strikes a nice balance between creepy and comforting, but especially endearing is Gabe's early return home..." "Kirkus Reviews called it "an unusually well-done debut."

Artwork from I Need My Monster was showcased in "Sendak & Co.: Children's Book Illustrations Since Where the Wild Things Are," an exhibit at the Appleton Museum of Art.
