= Gossamer =

Gossamer most commonly refers to:

- Fine spider silk used by spiderlings for ballooning or kiting
- Gossamer (fabric), very light, sheer, gauze-like fabric

Gossamer may also refer to:

== Technology ==
- Gossamer Condor, the first human-powered aircraft capable of controlled and sustained flight
- Gossamer Albatross, a human-powered aircraft built by American aeronautical engineer Dr. Paul B. MacCready's AeroVironment
- The code name of the motherboard used in first-generation Apple G3 Macs

== Arts and media ==
=== Literature ===
- Gossamer (novel), 2006, by Lois Lowry
- "Gossamer", a 1995 short story by Stephen Baxter in his collection Vacuum Diagrams and The Hard SF Renaissance anthology

=== Music ===
- Gossamer (album), by Passion Pit
- "Gossamer", a song by The Smashing Pumpkins from the tour for Zeitgeist but not released on the album

=== Other media ===
- The Gossamer Project (or Gossamer Archive), a large X-Files fan fiction archive
- Gossamer (Looney Tunes), a character in the Looney Tunes cartoons
- Gossamer, alias of two different DC Comics superheroes, Ayla Ranzz and Jay Nakamura

== Biology ==
- Lycaenidae, gossamer-winged butterflies
- Euphaeidae, "gossamer-wings" (damselflies)

== Other uses ==
- Gossamer, a golden ale produced by the Half Acre Beer Company in Chicago
- The gossamer rings of Jupiter
- Gossamer (horse)
- HMS Gossamer, several ships of the Royal Navy
