= Rabble =

Rabble may refer to:

- Hoi polloi, a negative term for the common people
- rabble.ca, a Canadian website
- An arrow in the arcade game Libble Rabble
- Rabble of Devilkin, characters in the Dungeons & Dragons roleplaying game
- Rabble Starkey, a novel
- The Rabble, a New Zealand music group
- An iron bar used in the manufacture of iron and steel
