= Gathering Blue =

2000 novel by Lois Lowry

- First edition cover
- Author: Lois Lowry
- Language: English
- Series: The Giver Quartet
- Genre: Young adult fiction
- Publisher: Houghton Mifflin Harcourt
- Publication date: September 25, 2000
- Publication place: United States
- Media type: Print (hardback & paperback)
- Pages: 241
- ISBN: 0-618-05581-9
- OCLC: 43728928
- Dewey Decimal: [Fic] 21
- LC Class: PZ7.L9673 Gat 2000
- Preceded by: The Giver
- Followed by: Messenger

Gathering Blue is a young adult-dystopian novel written by American author Lois Lowry and was published on September 25, 2000. A companion book to The Giver (1993), it is set in the same future time period and universe, treats some of the same themes, and is followed by Messenger (2004) and Son (2012) in The Giver Quartet.

The central character, Kira is an orphan who has a deformed leg, and must learn to survive in a society that normally leaves the weak or disabled exposed to die in the fields. In the course of the book, she begins to learn the art of dyeing thread to different colors except for blue, which nobody in her community knows how to make. She also learns more about the truth of her village and the terrible secrets that they hold.

== Plot ==
Kira, who has a deformed leg, becomes orphaned when her mother dies unexpectedly from an unknown sickness. Her father died years ago on a hunt with the Hunters by being killed by the Beasts. Kira must learn to survive in a society that normally leaves the weak or disabled exposed to be killed by the Beasts in the fields.

Kira needs a reason for the council to keep her in the village and not to take her to the Field, which would mean certain death at the hands of The Beasts. Much to her surprise, a member of the council, Jamison, defends Kira during the trial, arguing that Kira has a gift for embroidery. Thus, the council finds her worthy of life in society and gives her the task of repairing the Singer's robe.

Annabella, a much older woman, teaches Kira to further solidify her talent by showing her how to create dye for use in her thread work. However, to Kira's dismay, she learns that there is no ability to create the color blue.

Eventually, to Kira's surprise, Annabella tells her that she knows much of the society's history and even goes so far as to say that there really are no Beasts. Kira is unsure what to think of that revelation or what Annabella really means by it.

Along the way, she becomes closer friends with a younger boy, Matt, and makes a new friend in her neighborhood at her new home, Thomas, who is a boy around Kira's age. Thomas is also an orphan and has lived there since he was very young because of his abilities. Kira learns that he is the woodworker who maintains and improves the Singer's staff, which, in turn, helps the Singer remember the history of the society as he sings the lengthy song. Together, they help each other bring out the best in their talents to prepare for The Gathering. Jamison, the Guardian who fought for her life in the trial, becomes somewhat of a mentor in her new home. He is kind and instructive but also very stern.

Kira slowly learns that her life is less than idyllic. Thomas hears crying in her building, and they discover another orphan, a very young girl, Jo, whose ability to sing is magnificent. She is kept with the intent of eventually replacing the current Singer. Jo is scolded and punished if she does not sing. Kira secretly befriends her and sneaks into Jo's locked room at night to comfort her. Kira realizes that the three do not have as much freedom as they had previously thought. Annabella abruptly dies, and while Matt tells Kira that the old dyer had died and been dragged to the Field by Jamison and his men, Jamison later says that Annabella had died of old age in her sleep. Kira is left to continue her work. That, and the secluded life that a very young Jo must live, help Kira decide to uncover the truth about her society.

On the day that the Singer sings the Song at the Gathering, Matt is nowhere to be found. At the Ceremony of the Gathering, she notices that the current Singer both uses the staff that Thomas has worked so hard on and wears the robe that she repaired and enhanced. She realizes that his feet are chained, scarred, and bleeding, meaning that he is essentially a prisoner kept for the Ceremony because of his talent. This implies that Kira and the others with Gifts, which the council has saved for their jobs, are also prisoners. The Council controls their gifts through tenants who, without any creativity of their own, demand that the three provide a future that they envision.

After a long absence, Matt returns with a blind man wearing a blue shirt from the distant Village of Healing. The man is Kira's father, Christopher, who Kira had long thought dead. Christopher reveals that he had been attacked years earlier by another hunter, who was jealous of his immediate potential of being a member on the Council. He was beaten and stabbed, which blinded him. After being taken to the fields to die with the other rejected, injured, and dying citizens of their society, some people he could not see rescued him and took him to the Village from which he had traveled. This village is full of kind and helpful people, as opposed to the selfish residents of Kira's village. Matt excitedly explains that they know the way to make blue threads, and he brings plants so Kira can as well.

After a long heartfelt reunion with his daughter, Christopher reveals that he has enemies on the council. The one who maimed him years before was none other than Jamison. He tearfully apologizes for taking so long to return to get her. Because of the memory loss caused by the beating and his loss of sight, he had no way of finding her. Matt had gone looking for a way to make blue for Kira and stumbled upon Christopher's village, leading to the reunion.

Kira begins to wonder if the Council had also caused her mother's sudden death and the deaths of the two other orphans' parents in order to acquire the young, gifted children and mold them into creating the future that it wanted.

Unable to stay, Christopher is forced to return to his village. Kira, however, decides to stay in her own community to continue to embroider the Singer's robe and help improve her society. Matt is designated as the "eyes" that will help Christopher find his way back. It is implied that Thomas, Kira, and Jo, who are the new holders of the Gifts, have the opportunity to change the cycle of their society and to improve the conditions in which they live by using their gifts to immensely influence their peoples' actions.

At the end of the book, Matt tells Kira that in the Village, all are important and married, which she would have to do without in her society. He continues to tell her about a boy from the Village who has blue eyes, is around her age, and is not injured in any way (alluding to Jonas from The Giver) in the hope that will entice her to come with them. Kira declines to go with them but, instead, decides to follow once she finishes her current task. In the meantime, Matt—named the messenger — will travel back and forth between Kira and Christopher, relaying their messages.

== Reception ==
The book appeared in the 9th spot on the Children's Books version of The New York Times Best seller list on October 8, 2000, and again on October 29, this time in the tenth spot. Gathering Blue also received the 2001 award for Selected Audiobooks for Young Adults.
