= All About Sam =

1988 children's novel by Lois Lowry

- First edition
- Author: Lois Lowry
- Illustrator: Diane de Groat
- Language: English
- Series: Sam Krupnik
- Release number: 1
- Genre: Children's
- Publisher: Houghton Mifflin
- Publication date: 1988
- Publication place: United States
- Media type: Print
- Pages: 135
- Awards: Mark Twain Award
- ISBN: 978-0544582354
- OCLC: 861695921
- LC Class: PZ7.L9673
- Followed by: Attaboy, Sam!
- Website: http://loislowry.com/books-sam-krupnik-series/

All About Sam (1988) is a children's novel by Lois Lowry. It is the first in a series of four novels about the character Sam Krupnik; a character Lowry had developed earlier in her books on Sam's older sister, Anastasia Krupnik. The novel is known for its humor, and was included in the 2003 reference publication Something Funny Happened At the Library published by the American Library Association. A 1997 assessment of the novel by Joel Chaston stated that the work had wide appeal to young readers, and whereas the related Anastasia series books had appealed more to girls, the Sam Krupnik series expanded readership to audience of all genders.

== Background ==
In Lowry's book Anastasia Krupnik, Anastasia's parents give birth to her younger brother Sam, who would feature as a side character in later Anastasia books. Sam proved unexpectedly popular among readers, who asked Lowry to write books about Sam as well. All About Sam was Lowry's first book in what would later become the Sam Krupnik series.

== Plot summary ==
Sam Krupnik is a mischievous little boy, but mostly curious. He is very smart, and from the day he was born, Anastasia was jealous.

The story is told from Baby Sam's viewpoint and consists of his observations, feelings and thoughts, in the manner of the 1989 film Look Who's Talking.
