= See You Around, Sam! =

1996 novel by Lois Lowry

- First edition
- Author: Lois Lowry
- Illustrator: Diane de Groat
- Language: English
- Series: Sam Krupnik
- Release number: 3
- Genre: Children's
- Publisher: Houghton Mifflin
- Publication date: October 1, 1996
- Publication place: United States
- Media type: Print
- Pages: 113
- ISBN: 0-395-81664-5
- OCLC: 913924242
- LC Class: PZ7.L9673
- Preceded by: Attaboy, Sam!
- Followed by: Zooman Sam

See You Around, Sam (1996) is a children's novel written by Lois Lowry and illustrated by Diane de Groat. It is part of a series of books that Lowry wrote about Anastasia and her younger brother, Sam.

== Summary ==
Sam Krupnik is excited to have a new pair of plastic fangs, but his "fangphobic" mother won't allow him to wear them in the house. Angry at her, Sam is determined to run away to Sleetmute, Alaska and live with the walruses: since walruses have fangs, they won't mind Sam's fangs, either. He wants to say goodbye to all his neighbors before leaving, and goes to visit their homes one by one. By the end of the day, though, Sam realizes he doesn't know the way to Alaska, and decides to return home.

== Reception ==
Kirkus Reviews described the book as a "delight", praising Lowry's "powerfully sympathetic writing" and de Groat's illustrations.
