= Anastasia Again! =

1981 young-adult novel by Lois Lowry

- Author: Lois Lowry
- Cover artist: Diane deGroat
- Language: English
- Series: The Anastasia Series
- Genre: Young adult
- Publisher: Houghton Mifflin
- Publication date: 1981
- Publication place: United States
- Media type: Print
- Pages: 145
- ISBN: 978-0395311479
- LC Class: PZ7.L9673 Am
- Preceded by: Anastasia Krupnik
- Followed by: Anastasia at Your Service

Anastasia Again! is a 1981 young-adult novel by Lois Lowry. It is part of her Anastasia and Sam series and the sequel to Anastasia Krupnik.

In it 12-year-old Anastasia is confronted with the challenge of her parents deciding the family is to move out of their city apartment which has become too small for their needs following the birth of Anastasia's baby brother Sam. Initially Anastasia does not want to move because the new house is in the suburbs, which Anastasia thinks are inferior, but over time she warms to the idea and makes new friends in suburbia.

The book was banned at Spook Hill Elementary school's library in 2005 after a parent complained that the content, particularly Anastasia's comment about killing herself, is inappropriate.

== Reviews ==
Though not one of Lowry's more popular young adult novels, the book and series did receive positive reviews upon release. Horn Book commented upon the novel stating "Anastasia Krupnik is one of the most intriguing female protagonists to appear in children's books since the advent of Harriet the Spy . . . Genuinely funny, the story is a marvelously human portrait of an articulate adolescent." It was awarded as an ALA Notable Book.

Boston Globe included it in a shortlist of books recommended to help children cope with the uncertainty of moving house.
