= Number the Stars =

1989 novel by Lois Lowry

- First edition cover.
- Author: Lois Lowry
- Original title: Number the Stars
- Cover artist: Lois Lowry
- Language: English
- Genre: Historical fiction
- Publisher: Houghton Mifflin Harcourt
- Publication date: 1989
- Publication place: Denmark
- Media type: Print
- Pages: 137
- Awards: Newbery Medal: 1990
- ISBN: 978-0395510605 (first edition, hardcover)
- OCLC: 18947847
- LC Class: PZ7.L9673 Nu 1989

Number the Stars is a 1989 historical novel by the American author Lois Lowry about the escape of a family of Jews from Copenhagen, Denmark, during World War II. Inspired by Danish accounts of the Holocaust and by Lowry’s research into the Danish Resistance, the novel highlights Christian Danes' efforts to help the Jews escape Nazi oppression.

The story revolves around ten-year-old Annemarie Johansen, who lives with her mother, father, and sister, Kirsti, in Copenhagen in 1943. Annemarie takes part in the rescue of the Danish Jews who are attempting to reach neutral ground in Sweden to avoid being relocated to concentration camps. She risks her life to help her best friend, Ellen Rosen, by pretending Ellen is Annemarie's late older sister, Lise, who was killed after she was run over by a truck. Lise's fiancé, Peter, who is partially based on the Danish Resistance member Kim Malthe-Bruun, also plays a role in helping the Rosen family and other Danish Jews escape to Sweden.

Beyond simple reading, Number the Stars is used in educational settings and children’s literature scholarship to connect historical fiction with World War II history. In doing so, this novel supports child-centered approaches to Holocaust education. Further, aligning with the United States Holocaust Memorial Museum's educational guidelines and making the top one hundred list for best-selling children's book of all time in the United States with sales above 2 million as of 2001, it has received numerous awards, including the Newbery Medal in 1990 as the previous year's "most distinguished contribution to American literature for children."

== Background ==
In a 2010 interview, Lowry explained that Number the Stars was inspired by her friend Annelise, who had grown up in Denmark and told her about the 1943 rescue of Danish Jews during the Holocaust by Christian Danes. Lowry stated that this account prompted her interest in the subject and provided the basis for the novel’s setting and events.

During the writing process, Lowry conducted research by speaking with individuals who had lived in Denmark during the German occupation, including members of the Danish Resistance, and by visiting locations in Denmark such as the Resistance Museum in Copenhagen and the coastal town of Gilleleje, which informed aspects of the book’s fictional setting. Lowry noted that she chose not to write from the Jewish perspective, explaining that she did not consider it appropriate to do so. Instead, she focused on the actions and conscious decisions made by the Danish Christian population, who could make choices to propel a plot that Jews could not at the time, emphasizing their collective role in hiding and evacuating Jewish citizens to Sweden. In Copenhagen, she took the photo of ten-year-old Anna Caterina Johnson, the Swedish girl used for the cover (shown in infobox), which was used on many book editions.

== Plot ==
Annemarie Johansen and her best friend Ellen Rosen live in Nazi-occupied Copenhagen, Denmark, during World War II, along with Annemarie's younger sister Kirsti. When they are stopped on their way home from school by German soldiers, Annemarie’s family becomes more cautious of the attention they draw to themselves, because Ellen is Jewish. As the German occupation intensifies, Denmark’s Jewish Population is targeted for relocation, and Ellen comes to stay with the Johansen's after her parents flee Denmark with Annemarie's brother-in-law, Peter. When German soldiers search the apartment, Ellen poses as Annemarie’s deceased sister Lise but the soldiers get suspicious when they see her dark hair. Annemarie's mother shows them a baby picture of Lise with darker hair and the family narrowly avoids discovery.

The next morning, Annemarie, Ellen, and Kirsti leave with Annemarie's mother to travel to their Uncle Henrik’s coastal home, where a staged funeral for Annemarie’s nonexistent Great Aunt Birte is used as cover to conceal Jewish refugees awaiting transport to Sweden. When German soldiers arrive and question the gathering, ordering the casket to be opened, Mrs. Johansen lies that they cannot open the casket because the deceased had typhus, and they leave without suspicion. Afterwards, Ellen and the other Jewish refugees say goodbye and prepare to be smuggled across the sea to Sweden.

Later, Annemarie sees that her mother has broken her ankle. After helping her back to the house, Annemarie is entrusted with delivering an important Resistance packet to Uncle Henrik, who is preparing to transport Jewish refugees to Sweden. She then sets out alone toward the coast with her basket containing the packet, but is stopped by Nazi soldiers with dogs, who question her and search what she is carrying. Despite their suspicions, she is released and successfully reaches Uncle Henrik’s boat, where she gives her uncle an envelope that contains a handkerchief, and returns home.

Henrik returns to Denmark later that evening from Sweden and explains that the handkerchief Annemarie delivered was used to mislead Nazi tracking dogs, helping ensure the refugees, including the Rosen’s, had safe passage to Sweden. It is also disclosed that Peter is a member of the Danish Resistance and that Annemarie’s sister Lise had been killed due to her involvement in Resistance activities.

Two years after these revelations, Denmark is liberated. In that time, Annemarie learns that Peter was executed by the Nazis and buried in an unmarked grave. She also finds Ellen's Star of David necklace, and after her father fixes it for her, she decides to wear it until Ellen returns to Denmark.

== Analysis ==
In classroom studies, Number the Stars has been used in both social studies and language arts instruction to support students’ engagement with historical content. Robin D. Groce, a professor of literacy education at Appalachian State University, describes Number the Stars as a work of historical fiction closely aligned with documented events of the Danish Resistance, and notes that it is often paired with nonfiction sources in social studies classes to help students connect literary narratives with historical evidence. In one Grade 5 classroom, a study of Number the Stars led students to organize a fundraising campaign for World Vision’s child soldier program, raising money to support children affected by armed conflict. Additionally, in a case study of a sixth-grade World War II unit at a classical Christian school, Number the Stars was used alongside other texts to support students’ learning of historical content related to World War II.

Literary critic Eric Kimmel categorizes Number the Stars as an example of “resistance” Holocaust fiction for young readers, a form of children’s literature that emphasizes the role of civilian resistance in saving Jewish lives during Nazi occupation. Within this framework, the novel reflects narratives of Danish resistance efforts and the evacuation of Jewish citizens to neutral Sweden, educating children on events during this time period. Similarly, David Russel, a scholarly commentator on children’s literature, situates Number the Stars within Holocaust children’s literature that seeks to make historical trauma accessible to young readers while still conveying its moral and emotional seriousness. Russell claims that such texts help students understand the complexity of the Holocaust through carefully mediated narratives that highlight courage, ethical decision-making, and the experiences of individuals rather than abstract statistics. In this context, scholars of children’s literature have situated Number the Stars within broader discussions of Holocaust narratives for younger readers that emphasize indirect, child-centered approaches to representing and remembering historical trauma.

== Reception ==
Critical and popular reactions to Number the Stars were positive overall. Kirkus Reviews said that "...like Annemarie, the reader is protected from the full implications of events—but will be caught up in the suspense and menace of several encounters with soldiers and in Annemarie's courageous run as a courier on the night of the escape."

Additionally, Number the Stars is regarded as one of the best-selling children's books of all time. According to Publishers Weekly, it was the 82nd best selling children's book of all time in the United States with sales above 2 million as of 2001. Sales have remained solid, even years after publication.

In terms of its historical representation of events surrounding World War II, the novel aligns with the educational guidelines of the United States Holocaust Memorial Museum for avoiding sensationalized depictions of the Holocaust. Marjorie Ingall specifically notes that its depiction of rescue in Nazi-occupied Denmark aligns with the book’s historical context because it does not romanticize heroism or imply that the Holocaust was inevitable.

== Awards ==
- 1989: Sydney Taylor Book Award
- 1990: Newbery Medal
- 1990: National Jewish Book Award in the Children's Literature category

== See also ==
- The Only Way, a 1970 English-language film about the rescue of the Danish Jews

Awards
Preceded by Joyful Noise: Poems for Two Voices	Newbery Medal recipient 1990	Succeeded by Maniac Magee
