= Zooman Sam =

1999 novel by Lois Lowry

- First edition
- Author: Lois Lowry
- Illustrator: Diane de Groat
- Language: English
- Series: The Sam Series
- Genre: Children's novel
- Publisher: Houghton Mifflin Harcourt
- Publication date: September 27, 1999
- Publication place: United States
- Media type: Print
- Pages: 155
- ISBN: 0-395-97393-7
- OCLC: 40573222
- LC Class: PZ7.L9673 Zo 1999
- Preceded by: See You Around, Sam!

Zooman Sam (1999) is a children's novel by Lois Lowry. It is part of a series that Lowry wrote about Anastasia and her younger brother Sam.

== Reception ==
Kirkus Reviews finds that "the plotting is leisurely, the story is slender, and a subplot about the training of the family dog barely registers...the material runs out of steam before the novel ends...[but] fans of the Sam books may find satisfaction in the nicely foreshadowed but still unanticipated punch line." Rob Reid said, "It's a hilarious scene that will have the elementary-age crowd laughing."
