= Anastasia, Ask Your Analyst =

1984 novel by Lois Lowry

- Author: Lois Lowry
- Illustrator: Diane deGroat
- Language: English
- Series: The Anastasia Series
- Genre: Young adult
- Publisher: Houghton Mifflin
- Publication date: 1984
- Publication place: United States
- Media type: Print
- Pages: 119
- ISBN: 978-0-395-36011-8
- OCLC: 10324864
- LC Class: PZ7.L9673 Amc 1984
- Preceded by: Anastasia at Your Service
- Followed by: Anastasia on Her Own

Anastasia, Ask Your Analyst is a 1984 young-adult novel by Lois Lowry. It is part of a series of books that Lowry wrote about Anastasia and her younger brother Sam.
