= Anastasia at This Address =

1991 novel by Lois Lowry

- Author: Lois Lowry
- Cover artist: Diane deGroat
- Language: English
- Series: The Anastasia Series
- Genre: Young adult
- Publisher: Houghton Mifflin Harcourt
- Publication date: 1991
- Publication place: United States
- Media type: Print
- Pages: 129
- ISBN: 978-0-395-56263-5
- OCLC: 22512053
- LC Class: PZ7.L9673 Amcm 1991
- Preceded by: Anastasia's Chosen Career
- Followed by: Anastasia Absolutely

Anastasia at This Address (1991) is a young-adult novel by Lois Lowry. It is part of a series of books that Lowry wrote about Anastasia and her younger brother Sam.
