= Gossamer (novel) =

Novel by Lois Lowry

- Author: Lois Lowry
- Language: English
- Genre: Fantasy
- Publisher: Houghton Mifflin Harcourt
- Publication date: 2006
- Publication place: United States
- Media type: Print (hardback)
- Pages: 154 pages (hardback)
- ISBN: 978-0-618-68550-9
- OCLC: 62290452
- LC Class: PZ7.L9673 Gos 2006

Gossamer (2006) is a novel with elements of both fantasy and realism for young adults by Lois Lowry.

== Plot summary ==
The book's omniscient point of view, Littlest One, affectionately called Littlest, is out on a dark night. She and her mentor, Fastidious, stealthily sneak into a woman and her dog's home and collect memories. At their home, the Heap, Fastidious complains about her curious student to Most Ancient. Thin Elderly and Fastidious decide that Thin Elderly will become Littlest's mentor, while Fastidious is assigned to a modern house.

Littlest is part of a small sub-colony of dream-givers. Through touching, they gather fragments such as colors, words, sounds, and scents. They then combine the fragments to become dreams, and give the dreams to humans, and sometimes pets. The giving of dreams is called the bestowal.

The next night, Thin Elderly and Littlest go back to the woman's house. On the way, Thin Elderly explains to be gentle in the touching, and not to delve, on the grounds that a dream-giver who picks up menacing fragments of the memory's "underside" becomes a Sinisteed, a horse like creature, which are transformed dream-givers who inflict nightmares. Thin Elderly gladly discovers that Littlest has the "gossamer touch"; the ability to gather and bestow with great subtlety.

The woman reveals that she is to take an angry 8-year-old boy named John into her household and must learn to deal with the troubles in his life.

A young dream-giver named Strapping is introduced. His home, assigned as a mild punishment, is a dilapidated room at the woman's home. He displays his anger by acting contemptuous of his surrounding. The caretaker, for her part, displays only kindness.

At the dream-givers' Heap, Most Ancient reports that the Sinisteeds are gathering, intent on a particular victim.

That night, Littlest and Thin Elderly experience a Sinisteed at work. It inflicts John with a nightmare. He cries out in his sleep, whereupon the woman calms him by reminding him of a happy moment in his past. Littlest and Thin Elderly then gather comforting fragments to help strengthen him after the nightmare.

That night, Littlest decides she must touch the dog, seeking to derive fragments from him. Thin Elderly protests, as they are advised not to touch living creatures, but allows her to do so. Littlest notices how tender John is to a pink seashell, to Toby, and to a chrysalis he had found, in which is growing a butterfly. She gathers fragments from Toby, and bestows them as part of a dream.

The young woman, Strapping's assignment, begins working in a school. She reflects on how bad her old life was for her son, John, because of her abusive husband, Duane. She now has hope of making friends, which Duane had not allowed her to do.

Thin Elderly is proud of Littlest's bestowal, because John is happy in his dreams. Littlest explains that the fragments she collected had a bit of a story in each one, which she put together in her mind.

Strapping is satisfied with his work. Strapping discovers he has a liking and a hope for the woman. Accordingly, he gives her dreams of hope and of a better future with her son.

John tells a story to the old woman about a young boy who ate dog food, having been ordered to do so by his father, who had seen the boy run naked through the house and urinate on the floor. The father had accused the son of behaving like a dog, and so given him dog food for all his meals. The woman realizes that John is telling a story about himself, explaining his past abuse and his own harsh behavior.

That night, Littlest and Thin Elderly discover that a Horde of Sinisteeds intend to inflict nightmares on John and his caretaker. The two dream-givers respond by bestowing strengthening dreams. They are nearly killed in the stampede of the Horde, but are able to counteract the nightmares and strengthen the humans. This is the story's climax.

John enters school, and has become a much happier child. Littlest's dreams and the old woman's care have helped him begin to heal.

Littlest is commended for her work. She learns that she is to be reassigned, a possibility not hitherto considered. She wishes to remain assigned to John, whom she has come to love and cherish, but is told by Thin Elderly that dream-givers are not permitted to generate human emotions. That is when Thin Elderly tells Littlest One that they are imaginary (within the people, dreams, and the stories). Littlest One's experiences with the boy have helped her grow more mature, and as a result she is given the name Gossamer and given a new dream-giver, New Littlest, to train.

== Characters ==
- Littlest One/Gossamer: Littlest is the name of the young dream-giver at the beginning of the book. She is quite carefree and is curious about everything. She gains the name Gossamer for her gossamer touch.
- The Old Woman : The old woman is an unnamed elderly woman that lives a lonely life with her dog, Toby. She decides to foster a young girl but gets a young boy named John instead. The old woman is less lonely when she is given good dreams.
- John: John is the young boy that Littlest and Thin Elderly receive as their assignment. He and his mother were both verbally and physically abused by John's father, Duane. John is eight years old.
- John's Mother: John's mother is not explicitly named in the book. She is an intelligent woman, but was forbidden to participate in social and intellectual events by Duane. After her divorce she becomes a secretary at John's school.
- Thin Elderly: Thin Elderly is the dream-giver that is Littlest/Gossamer's instructor. He is quite experienced and patiently answers Littlest's questions without taking offense. He takes care in his dream-giving and is quite happy with it.
- Most Ancient: Most Ancient is the eldest dream-giver of Gossamer's Heap. He is wise in many ways and advises the dream-givers in many aspects of life.
- Strapping: Strapping is a young dream-giver from a different Heap. He was careless in his dream-giving; however, after he was assigned to John's mother as punishment, he becomes more affectionate and caring.
- Fastidious: Fastidious is another dream-giver of the Heap. She is extremely irritable, grouchy, and impatient; hence her name Fastidious. She was introduced as Littlest's mentor, but gave the task thereof to Thin Elderly, an older dream-giver who volunteered for the job in Fastidious' place.

== Publication details ==
- 2006, USA, Walter Lorriane Books (ISBN 978-0-618-68550-9), pub date ? ? 2006, hardback (First edition)

== Reception ==
Publishers Weekly referred to Gossamer as a "poetic, fanciful", and "spellbinding story" crafted with Lowry's "exquisite, at times mesmerizing writing". They described the novel's prose as "lyrical" and "richly descriptive", and highlighted how it "ushers readers into a fascinating parallel world inhabited by appealingly quirky characters". Similarly, F. Todd Goodson, writing for ALAN Review, highlighted how the novel is "rich in archetypal characters and imagery, reading something like one of the pleasant dreams bestowed by its central character".

In a starred review, Kirkus Reviews called Gossamer's prose "light as gossamer" and "the story as haunting as a dream." They also drew connections to Lowry's previous work, writing, "Readers familiar with The Giver will most appreciate Lowry’s riff on the value of memories and dreams and the importance of the sad parts of our lives, too."

While noting that Gossamer's "lyrical and delicate style [is] appropriate to its subject matter", April Spisak, writing for The Bulletin of the Center for Children's Books, found that "the delicacy sometimes becomes coy and mannered, [...] and the fantasy world overshadows the growing relationship between John and his unnamed foster mother". Spisak also referred to the "human story" as "heavy handed", especially given that "the maturation and healing of the characters is conveyed through their lengthy discussions of the subject rather than through the book's demonstration of their growth". Despite these concerns, Spisak concluded that "the novel effectively evokes the flimsy and sometimes tentative grasp on happiness and comfort in a way many readers will understand".

Sarah Wanlass, writing for Children's Book and Media Review, additionally critiqued the novel's "remote, omniscient narrator tone", which may leave readers feeling "distanced from the story".

The audiobook narrated by Anne Twomey received reviews from Booklist and Publishers Weekly. Publishers Weekly wrote, "Twomey does an excellent job of distinguishing her voice for the different characters"

Despite offering a positive review for the novel, Publishers Weekly found the audiobook rendition to be "a less-than-satisfying listen", indicating that the audiobook's "many lyrical, detailed descriptions [...] become overlong and slow-moving when read aloud". Similarly, although they found "Twomey's soft, soothing voice fits the subject matter", they also indicated it "may well lull young listeners off to dreamland".

== Accolades ==
Gossamer is a Junior Library Guild book. The Association for Library Service to Children included it on their 2007 lists of Notable Children's Books and Notable Children's Recordings.

== Adaptation ==
Gossamer was adapted into a play.
