= A Summer to Die =

1977 novel by Lois Lowry

- Cover art from the first edition
- Author: Lois Lowry
- Illustrator: Jenni Oliver
- Language: English
- Genre: Young adult fiction
- Publisher: Houghton Mifflin Harcourt
- Publication date: 1977
- Pages: 154
- ISBN: 9780395253380
- OCLC: 2799020

A Summer to Die was the first novel by American author Lois Lowry.

== Plot ==
Meg, the younger of two sisters, is the story's narrator and primary protagonist. Their father, an English professor at a university, has decided to take a year off from teaching to write a book that he only half-jokingly claims will shake the world of literature. That means the family relocates to a small country house, and his daughters are upset to be sharing a room. Like most sisters, Meg and Molly quarrel over silly things, and Meg is jealous of her sister's blonde curls and long eyelashes.

The owner of the house that the family is renting lives down the road in a smaller house on the same property. The sisters soon establish a rapport with the elderly Will Banks, who learns about photography with Meg and teaches Molly about the abundant wildflowers covering the estate. A few months after coming to the country, Molly begins having constant nosebleeds, which the doctor blames on the cold weather. Unfortunately, it is not until Molly's bed is soaked in blood that she is rushed to the hospital and diagnosed with a fatal disease: acute myelogenous leukemia.

After treatment, she seems to recover slightly, but the pills that she takes cause her hair to fall out.

Shortly thereafter, Ben Brady and a pregnant Maria Abbott, whom the townspeople incorrectly assume to be unmarried, arrive to make the third Banks house their home. All inhabitants of the property enjoy one another's company for a while. Then, the unthinkable happens, and Molly is rushed back to the hospital. She asks Meg to tell the baby to wait to be born until she comes home, and Meg obliges her, and she asks the baby to be born in the daytime since she was invited to take pictures of the birth. They name it Happy William Abbott-Brady. In the end, Molly dies, and the family moves back to the city.

Through it all and with help from those who love her, Meg finds the jealousy that she once had for her sister has changed into pure love. Eventually, she is forced to accept that bad things happen to good people.

== Background ==
Lowry drew upon her own experience of losing her sister at a young age when writing this novel, as she stated in a 2002 lecture:

"A Summer to Die wrenched open the excruciating door of loss. My beloved sister had died young. She was the one who had shown me how words work, using her own first-grade books, when I was three; the one who took up Cherry Ames and curlers while I stuck to my classics and unkempt pigtails and we were briefly, childishly, estranged.
"My family, stoic, Wasp and Nordic, was silent after the loss.
...
Shakespeare tells us to give sorrow words. But it took me so many years to do so, coming from a tradition such as mine, which taught me not to open a door on such darkness. Having done so—having felt the weight of the closed door lifted—I began to hear from the children and families affected by the book. And only then, for the first time, did I perceive that when I, as a child, sought from stories something that I had no name for, it had simply been unquestioning intimacy I needed. A place to listen with one's heart. Glimpsed light spilling from a warm kitchen into the dark staircase where I sat alone."
