= Anastasia at Your Service =

1982 novel by Lois Lowry

- Author: Lois Lowry
- Illustrator: Diane deGroat
- Language: English
- Series: The Anastasia Series
- Genre: Young adult
- Publisher: Houghton Mifflin
- Publication date: 1982
- Publication place: United States
- Media type: Print
- Pages: 149
- ISBN: 978-0395328651
- OCLC: 8475205
- LC Class: PZ7.L9673 Amd 1982
- Preceded by: Anastasia Again!
- Followed by: Anastasia, Ask Your Analyst

Anastasia At Your Service is a 1982 young-adult novel by Lois Lowry. It is the third part of a series of books Lois Lowry wrote about Anastasia and her younger brother Sam. The first edition was illustrated by Diane De Groat.
