= Anastasia Absolutely =

1995 novel by Lois Lowry

- Author: Lois Lowry
- Cover artist: Diane deGroat
- Language: English
- Series: The Anastasia Series
- Genre: Young adult literature
- Publisher: Houghton Mifflin Harcourt
- Publication date: October 30, 1995
- Publication place: United States
- Media type: Print
- Pages: 119
- ISBN: 0-395-74521-7
- OCLC: 32131363
- LC Class: PZ7.L9673 Alb 1995
- Preceded by: Anastasia at This Address

Anastasia Absolutely (1995) is a young-adult novel by Lois Lowry. It is part of a series of books that Lowry wrote about Anastasia and her younger brother Sam.

== Plot ==
Anastasia, a junior high school student, takes a class on values which makes her begin to question ethics in the world around her and her own life. She faces a moral dilemma of her own when she accidentally mixes up her dog's waste and some letters she is meant to deliver, and must decide whether or not she should confess.

== Critical reception ==
The School Library Journal said "The plot is pretty far-fetched and the dog-doo dilemma packs only so much humor. The Values class assignments tagged to the end of each chapter--scenarios drawn from modern life--are also a letdown. The wishy-washy responses from Anastasia and her family reveal neither humor nor depth of thought and are out of character from the Krupniks we have come to know. While children have come to expect more from this very talented author, the book is packed with believable dialogue and references to current groups and situations."

== See also ==
- Lois Lowry
