= Attaboy, Sam! =

1992 novel by Lois Lowry

- First edition
- Author: Lois Lowry
- Audio read by: Bryan Kennedy
- Illustrator: Diane de Groat
- Language: English
- Series: Sam Krupnik
- Release number: 2
- Genre: Children's
- Publisher: Houghton Mifflin
- Publication date: April 1, 1992
- Publication place: United States
- Media type: Print
- Pages: 116
- Awards: Iowa Children's Choice Award
- ISBN: 978-0-395-61588-1
- OCLC: 779274949
- LC Class: PZ7.L9673
- Preceded by: All About Sam
- Followed by: See You Around, Sam!
- Website: http://loislowry.com/books-sam-krupnik-series/

Attaboy, Sam! (1992) is a children's novel by Lois Lowry. It is the second book in a series that Lowry wrote about Anastasia and her younger brother Sam.

== Plot summary ==
When Mrs. Krupnik announces that she only wants homemade gifts for her birthday, Sam's older sister Anastasia decides to write their mother a poem, while Sam opts to make a perfume. He begins collecting various things that his mother says she likes the smell of, storing them in a grape juice bottle. However, as Sam collects more and more ingredients for the perfume—such as his father's pipe, chicken soup, locks of freshly-washed hair, yeast, and baby wipes—he realizes that the "perfume" is smelling worse and worse. Despite this, Sam continues making the perfume, hoping it will start smelling better.

== Reception ==
Kirkus Reviews praised the book, describing it as "warm, lively, true to children's real inner lives, and laugh-aloud funny all the way." While a review in Publishers Weekly found the book generally enjoyable (in particular, praising the relationship between Sam and Anastasia), it wrote that the book's target age range was unclear, with Anastasia's subplot more fitting for older readers.
