= Gooney Bird Greene =

Book by Lois Lowry

- First edition
- Author: Lois Lowry
- Illustrator: Middy Thomas
- Language: English
- Series: Gooney Bird series
- Release number: 1
- Genre: Children's
- Publisher: Houghton Mifflin
- Publication date: September 1, 2002
- Publication place: United States
- Media type: Print
- Pages: 88
- ISBN: 0-618-23848-4
- OCLC: 858843293
- LC Class: PZ7.L9673
- Followed by: Gooney Bird and the Room Mother
- Website: http://loislowry.com/books-gooney-bird/

Gooney Bird Greene (2002) is the first of a series of children's novels by Lois Lowry concerning the storytelling abilities of a second-grade girl. It was illustrated by Middy Thomas.

== Plot ==
Gooney Bird Greene has just transferred to Mrs. Pidgeon's second grade class in Watertower. She is unusually self-confident, likes to be the center of attention, and has an eccentric flair for style, and an exciting, almost magical past. When Mrs. Pidgeon suggests storytelling lessons, the class demands, instead of well-worn Christopher Columbus, Gooney Bird as the main character of the story.

== Reception ==
Reviews of Gooney Bird Greene were generally positive. Though Publishers Weekly viewed Gooney Bird's precocious storytelling skills with some skepticism, it wrote that her eccentric behavior and stories were entertaining, particularly to child readers. Kirkus Reviews praised the book's illustration and design choices, and described the titular second-grader's tales as "clever", noting that the book was a good instrument for teaching writing and storytelling.
