= Anastasia's Chosen Career =

1987 book by Lois Lowry

- First edition
- Author: Lois Lowry
- Cover artist: Diane deGroat
- Language: English
- Series: The Anastasia Series
- Genre: Young adult
- Publisher: Houghton Mifflin Harcourt
- Publication date: 1987
- Publication place: United States
- Media type: Print
- Pages: 142
- ISBN: 978-0-3954-2506-0
- OCLC: 16087830
- LC Class: PZ7.L9673 Aq 1987
- Preceded by: Anastasia Has the Answers
- Followed by: Anastasia at This Address

Anastasia's Chosen Career is a 1987 young-adult novel by Lois Lowry. It is the seventh part of a series of books that Lowry wrote about Anastasia and her younger brother Sam.

After being assigned a school essay on her chosen career, Anastasia spends her vacation unsuccessfully trying to interview a bookshop owner and attending a modeling class which has a number of similarities to the Barbizon modeling school franchise.

== Reception ==
"Lowry gives readers a fine mixture of wit and wisdom, offering funny adolescent dialogue that is true to their interests and language."—School Library Journal, starred review
