= Lois Lowry =

American writer (born 1937)

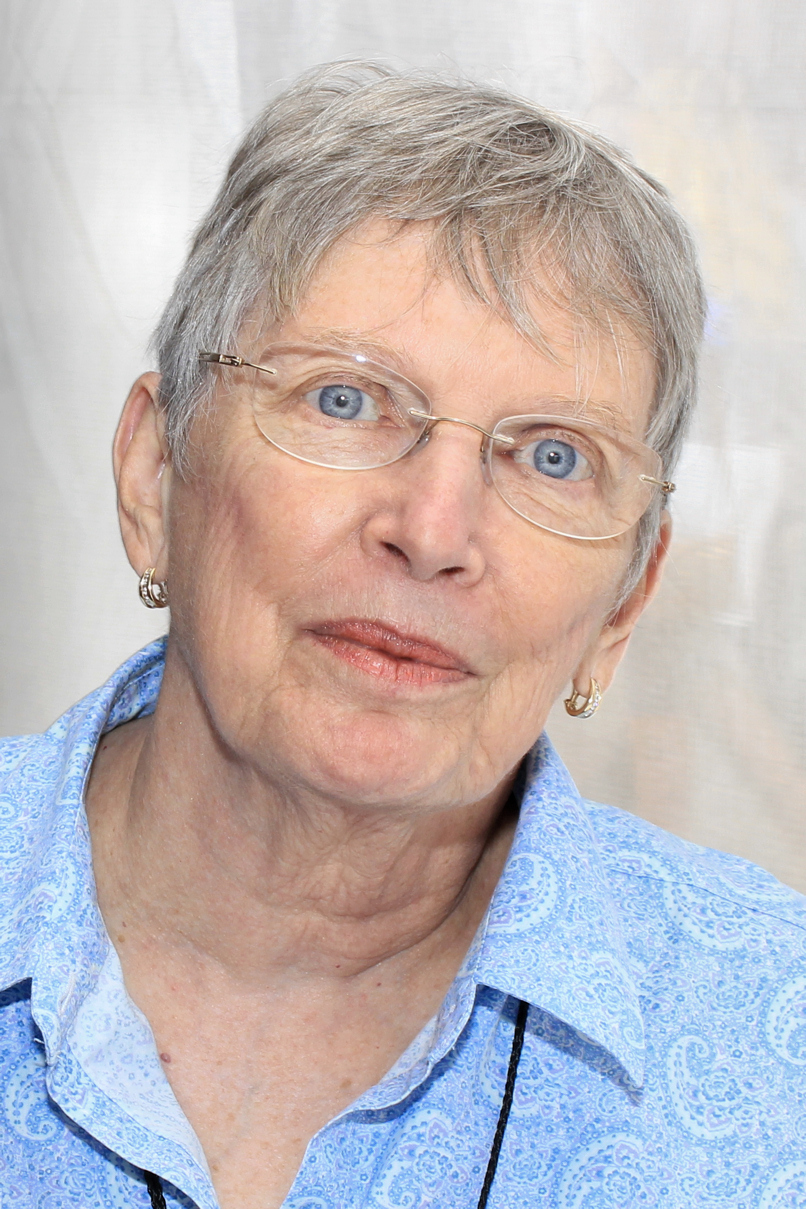
- Lowry at the 2016 Texas Book Festival
- Born: Lois Ann Hammersberg; March 20, 1937 (age 89); Honolulu, Territory of Hawaii, U.S.
- Occupation: Writer
- Spouse: Donald Grey Lowry (m. 1956; div. 1977)
- Children: 4
- Writing career
- Period: 1977–present
- Genres: Children's literature, fantasy
- Notable works: The Giver (1993); Number the Stars (1989)
- Notable awards: Newbery Medal; 1990, 1994; Margaret Edwards Award; 2007
- Website: loislowry.com

Lois Ann Lowry (/ˈlaʊri/; née Hammersberg; born March 20, 1937) is an American writer. She is the author of many books for children and young adults, including The Giver Quartet, Number the Stars, the Anastasia series, and Rabble Starkey. She is known for writing about difficult subject matter, dystopias, and complex themes in works for young audiences.

Lowry has won two Newbery Medals: for Number the Stars in 1990 and The Giver in 1994. Her book Gooney Bird Greene won the 2002 Rhode Island Children's Book Award.

Many of her books have been challenged or even banned in some schools and libraries. The Giver, which is common in the curricula in some schools, has been prohibited in others.

== Life ==
Lowry was born on March 20, 1937, in Honolulu, Territory of Hawaii, to Katherine Gordon Landis and Robert E. Hammersberg. Her maternal grandfather, Merkel Landis, a banker, created the Christmas Club savings program in 1910. Initially, Lowry's parents named her "Cena" for her Norwegian grandmother, but upon hearing the news, her grandmother telegraphed and instructed Lowry's parents that the child should have an American name.

Lowry was the middle child. She had an older sister named Helen and a younger brother. Helen died of cancer in 1962.

Lowry's father was a U.S. Army dentist, whose work moved the family all over the United States and to many parts of the world. Lowry and her family moved from Hawaii to Brooklyn, New York, in 1940, when Lowry was three years old. They relocated in 1942 to her mother's home town in Carlisle, Pennsylvania, when Lowry's father was deployed to the Pacific during World War II. Lowry began reading at three years old, and after first grade, she skipped second at the Franklin School in Carlisle. As a child, she dreamed of becoming a writer.

After World War II ended, Lowry moved with her family to Tokyo, Japan, where her father was stationed from 1948 to 1952. Lowry attended seventh and eighth grades at the American School in Japan, a school for dependents of those involved in the military. She returned to the United States when the Korean War began in 1950. Lowry and her family briefly lived in Carlisle, Pennsylvania, again in 1950, where she attended her freshman year of high school before moving to Governors Island, New York, when her father was assigned to First Army Headquarters there. Lowry briefly attended Curtis High School, on Staten Island, then graduated from high school at Packer Collegiate Institute in Brooklyn Heights, New York, attending from 1952 to 1954. She then attended Pembroke College, which became fully merged with Brown University in 1971. There she met her future husband.

Lowry left the university in 1956 after her marriage to Donald Grey Lowry, a U.S. Navy officer. The couple moved several times from San Diego to New London, Connecticut, to Key West, Florida, to Charleston, South Carolina, to Cambridge, Massachusetts and finally to Portland, Maine. They had two daughters and two sons.

While raising her children, Lowry completed her degree in English literature at the University of Southern Maine in Portland, Maine, in 1972. After earning her Bachelor of Arts, she continued at the university to pursue graduate studies. In the mid-1970s, Lowry worked as a freelance writer and photographer.

In 1977, at 40 years old, Lowry's first book, A Summer to Die, was published. In the same year, she and Donald Lowry were divorced. Two years later, having moved to Boston, she met Martin Small and was in a relationship with him for over 30 years, until his death in 2011. From 2014 she was in a relationship with Howard Corwin, a retired physician, until his death in 2025.

Lowry's son Grey, a USAF major and flight instructor, was killed in the crash of his fighter plane in 1995. Lowry acknowledged that it was the most difficult day of her life, and she said, "His death in the cockpit of a warplane tore away a piece of my world, but it left me, too, with a wish to honor him by joining the many others trying to find a way to end conflict on this very fragile earth."

As of 2023, Lowry divides her time between a cottage in the Ocean View Retirement Community in Falmouth, Maine and a lovingly-restored 1768 farmhouse in the "lakes region" of western Maine. She remains a writer and speaker.

== Writing career ==
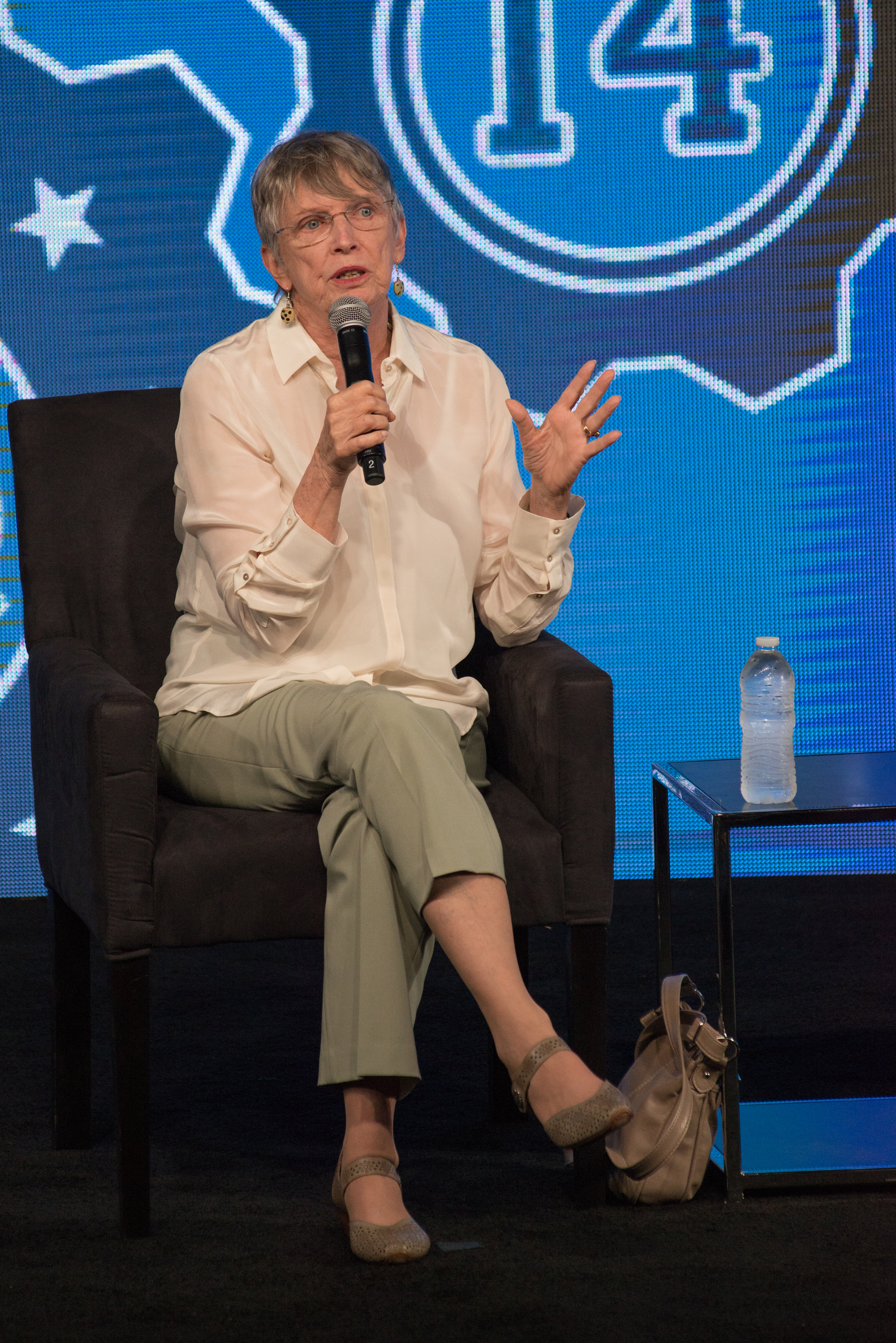
Lois Lowry at an event for the film adaption of The Giver in 2014

Lowry first began her career as a freelance journalist. In the 1970s, she submitted a short story to Redbook magazine, which was intended for adult audiences, but was written from a child's perspective. An editor working at Houghton Mifflin who read the Redbook story suggested to Lowry that she should write a children's book. Lowry agreed and wrote her first book A Summer to Die, which was later published by Houghton Mifflin in 1977 when she was 40 years old. The book featured the theme of terminal illness, which is based on Lowry's own experiences with her sister Helen.

Lowry continued to write about difficult topics in her next publication, Autumn Street (1980), which explores themes of coping with racism, grief, and fear at a young age. The novel is told from the perspective of a young girl who is sent to live with her grandfather during World War II, which is also based on her own experiences of having her father deployed during World War II. Of all the books she has published, Autumn Street is considered to be her most autobiographical.

In the same year of publishing Autumn Street, Lowry also published her novel Anastasia Krupnik, the first installment in the Anastasia series. The series, which touches on serious themes with a humorous approach, continued through to 1995.

Lowry published Number the Stars in 1989, which received multiple awards, including the 1990 Newbery Medal. Lowry received another Newbery in 1994, for The Giver (1993). The story focuses on the experiences of a twelve-year-old boy, Jonas, who becomes the apprentice of the Giver. The Giver is the protector of memories that have been suppressed by the community. As of 2021, The Giver has sold over 12 million copies, and it was one of the most frequently challenged books of the 1990s. On the impact of The Giver, Lowry said in an interview with School Library Journal, "That's why teachers love using the book. They can find many books with as compelling a plot as The Giver. But they can't find many books that provoke adolescents—who are tough nuts, anyway—to see issues that confront their world and to be passionately interested in them."

After publishing The Giver, she went on to publish another three companion novels that take place in the same universe: Gathering Blue (2000), Messenger (2004), and finally Son (2012), which tied all three of the previous books together. Collectively, they are referred to as The Giver Quartet. The New York Times described the quartet as "less a speculative fiction than a kind of guide for teaching children (and their parents, if they're listening carefully) how to be a good person."

In early 2020, she released a book of poetry, called On the Horizon, charting her childhood memories of life in Hawaii and Tokyo, and the lives lost during the attack on Pearl Harbor and the bombing of Hiroshima.

During the Covid-19 Pandemic in 2020, American publishing company Scholastic Corporation asked Lowry to write a new introduction to Like the Willow Tree, a story of a young girl living in Portland, Maine who was orphaned during the 1918 Spanish flu epidemic. The book had first been published in 2011, but Scholastic re-issued the book when it was clear that the issues portrayed in the story were newly relevant.

=== Critical reception and banning ===
Throughout her works, Lowry has explored several complex issues, including racism, terminal illness, murder, the Holocaust, and the questioning of authority, among other challenging topics. Her writing on such matters has accumulated both praise and criticism. The Chicago Tribune has said a theme running through all of her work is "the importance of human connections."

By 2000, eight of her books had been challenged in schools and libraries in the United States. In particular, The Giver received a diversity of reactions from schools in America after its release in 1993. While some schools adopted it as a part of the mandatory curriculum, others prohibited the book's inclusion in their classroom studies. According to the New York Times in 2012, The Giver had been perennially near the top of the America Library Association's list of banned and challenged books since its publication. In a 2012 review of Son, the New York Times said the 1993 publication of The Giver had "shocked adult and child sensibilities alike". In 2020, Time magazine described The Giver as "a staple of both middle school curricular and banned book lists."

When asked by School Library Journal in 2022 about how she feels about her writing appearing on "banned book" lists, she replied: "I read those lists, and my name often on them, with enormous sadness. I read them with a feeling that our children may be losing something very precious as the world of the imagination is increasingly endangered." Her newest book, 'Building 903', to be published by Clarion in September 2026, deals with the banning of books and how loss of literature can bring about the loss of imagination.

According to biographer Joel Chaston, Lowry's most critically acclaimed works are Rabble Starkey, Number the Stars, and The Giver.

== Impact ==
Biographer Joel Chaston described her as "clearly one of the most important twentieth-century American writers for children".

Robin Wasserman, a writer for The New York Times, said "In many ways, Lowry invented the contemporary young adult dystopian novel", pointing out that in 1993 it was "unusual and unsettling" for children's literature to address topics of political oppression, euthanasia, suicide, or murder.

== Awards ==
Lowry won the Newbery Medal in 1990 for her novel Number the Stars, and again in 1994 for The Giver. For Number the Stars, Lowry has also received the National Jewish Book Award in 1990, in the Children's Literature category, and the Dorothy Canfield Fisher Children's Book Award in 1991.

In 1994, Lowry was awarded the Regina Medal.

In 2002, her book Gooney Bird Greene won the Rhode Island Children's Book Award.

Lowry has been nominated three times for the biennial international Hans Christian Andersen Award, the highest recognition available to creators of children's books. She was a finalist in 2000, a U.S. nominee in 2004, and a finalist in 2016.

In 2007, she received the Margaret Edwards Award from the American Library Association for her contributions writing for teens. The ALA Margaret Edwards Award recognizes one writer and a particular body of work for "significant and lasting contribution to young adult literature". Lowry won the annual award in 2007 for The Giver (published 1993). The citation observed that "The Giver was one of the most frequently challenged books from 1990 to 2000" — that is, the object of "a formal, written attempt to remove a book from a library or classroom." According to the panel chair, "The book has held a unique position in teen literature. Lowry's exceptional use of metaphors and subtle complexity make it a book that will be discussed, debated and challenged for years to come...a perfect teen read."

She's also won a Boston Globe-Hornbook Award, an Anne V. Zarrow Award, a Golden Kite Award, and a Hope S. Dean Memorial Award.

In 2011 she gave the May Hill Arbuthnot Lecture; her lecture was titled "UNLEAVING: The Staying Power of Gold". She has been awarded honorary degrees from several universities, including a Doctorate of Letters by Brown University in 2014,St. Mary's College, University of Southern Maine, Elmhurst College, Wilson College, Lesley University, and Colby College.

== Works ==
=== Children's book series ===
The Giver Quartet (Note: With the release of Son (2012), the Giver series has been redefined as a finished "quartet" of fantasy novels. While Gathering Blue (2000) and Messenger (2004) were only loosely related companions to The Giver (1993), Son ties all three storylines together, with "heroes and fates colliding in a final, epic struggle." • Wasserman, Robin (October 14, 2012). "The Searcher". The New York Times Book Review. The New York Times Co.: 1.)

- The Giver (1993)
- Gathering Blue (2000)
- Messenger (2004)
- Son (2012)

Anastasia

- Anastasia Krupnik (1979)
- Anastasia Again! (1981)
- Anastasia at Your Service (1982)
- Anastasia, Ask Your Analyst (1984)
- Anastasia on Her Own (1985)
- Anastasia Has the Answers (1986)
- Anastasia's Chosen Career (1987)
- Anastasia at This Address (1991)
- Anastasia Absolutely (1995)

Sam Krupnik

- All about Sam (1988)
- Attaboy, Sam! (1992)
- See You Around, Sam! (1996)
- Zooman Sam (1999)

Tate Family

- The One Hundredth Thing About Caroline (1983)
- Switcharound (1985)
- Your Move, J.P.! (1990)

Gooney Bird

- Gooney Bird Greene (2002)
- Gooney Bird and the Room Mother (2006)
- Gooney the Fabulous (2007)
- Gooney Bird Is So Absurd (2009)
- Gooney Bird on the Map (2011)
- Gooney Bird and All Her Charms (2014)

The Willoughbys

- The Willoughbys (2008)
- The Willoughbys Return (2020)

=== Memoir ===
- Looking Back (1998; expanded edition 2016)

=== Novels ===
- A Summer to Die (1977)
- Find a Stranger, Say Goodbye (1978)
- Autumn Street (1980)
- Taking Care of Terrific (1983)
- Us and Uncle Fraud (1984)
- Rabble Starkey (1987)
- Number the Stars (1989)
- The Big Book for Peace (1990) (Illustrated by Trina Schart Hyman)
- Stay! Keeper's Story (1997)
- The Silent Boy (2003)
- Gossamer (2006)
- Crow Call (2009)
- The Birthday Ball (2010)
- Bless This Mouse (2011)
- Like the Willow Tree (2011)
- The Windeby Puzzle (2023)
- Tree. Table. Book. (2024)

=== Other ===
- Here in Kennebunkport (1978)
- Governors Island Teenager (2020)
- On the Horizon (2020)

== Adaptations ==
- The Giver (2014), a film directed by Phillip Noyce.
- The Willoughbys (2020), an animated film based on the book with the same name; released on Netflix and narrated by Ricky Gervais.
