= The Silent Boy =

2003 book written by Lois Lowry

- First edition
- Author: Lois Lowry
- Language: English
- Genre: Historical fiction, Young adult
- Publisher: Random House
- Publication date: 2003
- Publication place: United States
- Media type: Print (Hardback & Paperback)
- Pages: 178 p. (paperback edition)
- ISBN: 0-440-41980-8 (paperback edition)
- OCLC: 57662709

The Silent Boy is a 2003 book written by Lois Lowry. Categorized as both a young adult novel and historical fiction, The Silent Boy is set in a 20th-century farm community. The story was inspired by a pile of photos that Lowry found and which are interspersed throughout the narrative.

In 2008, the novel was adapted into a play by Greg Gunning.

== Plot ==
The story is told by Katy Thatcher, the young daughter of a small-town physician. She befriends a local boy, Jacob, who has a mental disability that prevents him from speaking. Jacob does not attend school, instead tending to the family farm and its livestock.

== Reception ==
In a starred review, Publishers Weekly praised Lowry for her ability to "[balance] humor and generosity with the obstacles and injustice of Katy's world to depict a complete picture of the turn of the 20th century".

On behalf of School Library Journal, Ellen Fader highlighted how "Lowry excels in developing strong and unique characters and in showing Katy's life in a small town that changes around her as the first telephones and automobiles arrive."

Booklist's Gillian Engberg wrote, "Lowry's graceful, lively prose is dense with historical details that, although atmospheric, sometimes focus more on Katy's lifestyle than her story. Katy's first-person voice also occasionally seems too mature. But Lowry still manages to create an appealing character in the curious, unusually compassionate girl, layering her story with questions about how families shape lives and the misunderstandings that can lead to heartbreak."

Booklist also reviewed the audiobook narrated by Karen Allen.

== Adaptation ==
In 2008, Greg Gunning adapted Lois Lowry's novel into a play The Silent Boy. The play was produced by ArtsPower National Touring Theatre, and in September 2008 through May 2009, toured the U.S. The original cast included David Beck as Jacob, Kristen Johnson as Katy, Andrew Dawson as Dr. Thatcher, and Mary C. McLellan as Peggy. In January 2009, Ashleigh Catsos replaced Johnson as Katy Thatcher. The production was very well received by both students and adults.
