= Anastasia on Her Own =

1985 novel by Lois Lowry

- First edition
- Author: Lois Lowry
- Cover artist: Diane deGroat
- Language: English
- Series: The Anastasia Series
- Genre: Young adult
- Publisher: Houghton Mifflin Harcourt
- Publication date: 1985
- Publication place: United States
- Media type: Print
- Pages: 131
- ISBN: 978-0-3953-8133-5
- OCLC: 11291115
- LC Class: PZ7.L9673 Ap 1985
- Preceded by: Anastasia, Ask Your Analyst
- Followed by: Anastasia Has the Answers

Anastasia on Her Own is a 1985 young-adult novel by Lois Lowry. It is part of a series of books that Lowry wrote about Anastasia and her younger brother Sam.

== Plot summary ==
Anastasia's mother, who is a children's book illustrator, finds out that she is being flown to California to act as a consultant for a film being made from a book that she illustrated. At first, Anastasia thinks that being in charge of the house in her mother's absence will be a snap, particularly when she and her father make up an easy to follow, super-organized housekeeping list. Unexpected events, however, keep shaking up Anastasia's domestic bliss. First, her younger brother Sam gets the chicken pox, and Anastasia has to stay home from school to take care of him. Then her boyfriend, Steve, asks her out on their first real date—but she finds out she can't go out with him because she has to stay home to chaperone a meeting between her father and Annie, one of his ex-girlfriends. Anastasia wants to plan a romantic dinner for herself and Steve, but worries that the romantic setting will affect her father and Annie. Numerous disasters—small and large—strike, but luckily Anastasia won't be on her own for long, as her mother is able to come home early and straighten things out again. Her mother's arrival brought her peace and happiness.

== Reception ==
Publishers Weekly called this book a "delicious" comedy and proclaimed it a "winner."
