= Messenger (novel) =

2004 novel by Lois Lowry

- First edition cover
- Author: Lois Lowry
- Language: English
- Series: The Giver Quartet
- Genre: Young adult fiction
- Publisher: Houghton Mifflin
- Publication date: April 26, 2004
- Publication place: United States
- Media type: Print (hardcover, paperback)
- Pages: 169
- ISBN: 978-0618404414
- OCLC: 53215694
- Dewey Decimal: [Fic] 22
- LC Class: PZ7.L9673 Me 2004
- Preceded by: Gathering Blue
- Followed by: Son

Messenger is a 2004 young adult dystopian novel by American author Lois Lowry, as is the third installment of The Giver Quartet, which began with the 1993 Newbery Medal-winning novel The Giver. The story takes place about six years after the events of The Giver, and the events of Gathering Blue, the preceding novel in the series. Characters from both of the previous books reappear in Messenger and give the novels a stronger continuity.

Set in an isolated community known simply as Village, the novel focuses on a boy, Matty, who serves as message-bearer through the ominous and lethal Forest that surrounds the community.

== Plot ==
Messenger is set about seven years after The Giver (1993) and Gathering Blue (2000). It is set in Village, a simple community which is inclusive of all who seek refuge within it. Matty now lives in Village with Kira's father, Christopher. Christopher is known in Village as Seer—his true name, which everyone in Village is given when they reach maturity. Jonas, from The Giver, is revealed to be alive, and is now the leader of Village.

Matty acts as a messenger, being the only person able to traverse the surrounding Forest safely. Others receive Warnings from Forest, indicating that they will not be able to travel there again without being harmed. Matty discovered that he has a supernatural "gift" where he can heal living things by touching them, at the cost of depleting himself.

The peaceful townspeople have gradually become selfish after the arrival of a man named Trademaster, who takes control of a market gathering known as Trade Mart. There, he offers anything the townspeople may possibly desire—such as attractiveness, or a slot machine-like device called a Gaming Machine—in exchange for their best qualities. For instance, when Mentor makes a trade, he loses his birthmark. Unwilling to share their resources, the townspeople vote to close Village's borders. Those who have never attended Trade Mart, such as Leader and Seer, disagree. Leader says that the wall cannot go up until three weeks have passed.

Leader assigns Matty to post notices of Village's border closure throughout Forest. Seer also asks him to bring Kira to Village before the wall is built. He retrieves Kira but they are assaulted by Forest and end up on the brink of death. Leader senses their plight with his gift, but is similarly trapped by Forest. Matty uses his gift to heal them and restore Forest and Village's natural order at the cost of his own life. After giving Matty the true name of "Healer", Leader and Kira return to Village.

== Reception ==
Publishers Weekly, Kirkus Reviews and Common Sense Media's Matt Berman praised the thought-provoking themes and simple yet "beautifully textured" prose.

In The ALAN Review, Sheryl O'Sullivan, a professor of English at Azusa Pacific University, commended Lowry for depicting evil with more ambiguity and gradualness than the two-dimensional portrayal of good and evil common in children's literature, mainly through Trade Mart's corruption of Village. Other reviewers also considered Trade Mart as an allegory for the societal impact of greed, selfishness and consumerism. In her review for Tor.com, American writer Mari Ness disliked what she felt was a thematic shift from the evil stemming from people's and societies' inner choices—à la The Giver and Gathering Blue —to evil caused by the influence of external, supernatural forces. She and Berman thought that plot aspects such as Forest's sentience and Trademaster's motives were insufficiently established or explained. Berman found the characters likable and the story engaging, but not as complex as its two prequels.

Messenger was nominated in the 2008 Young Hoosier Book Award.

Like The Giver, Messenger was banned in the Frisco Independent School District in Texas.
