= HMS Gossamer =

HMS Gossamer may refer to the following ships of the Royal Navy:

- HMS Gossamer (1821), a cutter
- HMS Gossamer (1890), a Sharpshooter-class torpedo gunboat
- HMS Gossamer (J63), a Halcyon-class minesweeper, sunk June 1942
- HMS Gossamer (1939), a M-class minelayer, also known as HMS Miner II, sunk as target 18 March 1970

== See also ==
- Gossamer (disambiguation)
