= Autumn Street =

1980 novel by Lois Lowry

- First edition
- Author: Lois Lowry
- Language: English
- Genre: Children's
- Publisher: Houghton Mifflin
- Publication date: 1980
- Publication place: United States
- Media type: Print (hardback & paperback)
- Pages: 188 pages
- ISBN: 0-395-27812-0
- OCLC: 5946557
- LC Class: PZ7.L9673 Au

Autumn Street is a 1980 novel by two-time Newbery Award-winning author Lois Lowry. The novel deals with themes of grief, racism, and coming of age.

== Background ==
Lowry has said that Autumn Street is autobiographical, and that the main character Elizabeth is based on her growing up in Pennsylvania. Similarly, she based the murder of a boy in the novel on a childhood friend, Gloria, who was also killed.

Lowry's publisher had a hard time marketing the book; though it was released as a children's book, its dark themes were seen as more suitable to adults than children, and The New Yorker reviewed it as an adult novel.

== Synopsis ==
A six-year-old girl, Elizabeth, along with her pregnant mother and her sister Jessica, move in with her grandfather and stern grandmother on Autumn Street in Pennsylvania during World War II. Though Elizabeth wants to stay in New York, her family tells her they must because of the war: her father, a soldier, has been deployed in the Pacific. At the end of the street are some dark woods, rumored to be overrun by giant turtles.

Elizabeth becomes friends with Charles, the grandson of the cook Tatie. Charles, who is Black, is forced to go to a separate school, and not allowed to be at the front of the house. The two bond, though Elizabeth struggles with her own racial prejudices, at one point calling him a racial slur during an argument. Elizabeth learns secrets about her family, such as her grandfather's broken engagement to her great-aunt. She also becomes enmeshed in the lives of two twins who live next door, Noah and Nathaniel. The twins are the subject of gossip: their German father disappeared when the war began, and Noah abuses animals and is cruel to his shyer brother. Elizabeth feels guilty, however, when Noah dies of pneumonia.

More tragedies begin to befall the people in Elizabeth's life; and her grandfather has a stroke. Elizabeth herself becomes sick with fever. One day during the winter, Elizabeth and Charles go sledding on a hill. After Charles is racially bullied and attacked by some nearby boys, he flees into the woods at the end of the street as a feverish Elizabeth goes home. There, he is murdered by a local vagrant who slits his throat. Elizabeth's grandmother, despite being previously cold toward the boy, attends his funeral service held at a Black church. When Elizabeth's father finally returns home from war, his leg severely injured, he reassures her that no more bad things would happen, though she knows differently.

== Critical reception ==
Kirkus Reviews noted the book's tonal resemblance to works of Southern fiction, and praised Lowry's "moving ability" through Elizabeth's narrration to "recall an experience in its totality.

The book was panned by The New York Times Book Review, which wrote that it "fatally lacks seasoning" despite its nostalgic tone.

== See also ==
- Lois Lowry's Bibliography
