= The Giver Quartet =

Novel series by Lois Lowry

- The Giver (1993); Gathering Blue (2000); Messenger (2004); Son (2012)
- Author: Lois Lowry
- Country: United States
- Language: English
- Genre: Young adult fiction
- Publisher: Houghton Mifflin Harcourt
- Published: 1993–2012
- Media type: Print (hardcover)
- No. of books: 4

The Giver Quartet is a series of four books about a dystopian world by American author Lois Lowry, which consists of The Giver (1993), Gathering Blue (2000), Messenger (2004), and Son (2012). The first book won the 1994 Newbery Medal and has sold more than 50 million copies. The story takes place at an unknown point of time within the future. Each book has a different protagonist but is set in the same futuristic era.

== Plot ==
=== The Giver ===
The Giver is a 1993 young adult novel set within a seemingly utopian community that is later revealed to be dystopian.

Within this society, a system called "Sameness" has gotten rid of pain and strife, but also emotional depth and individuality. At the annual "Ceremony of Twelve", where the Community's children get assigned their jobs, a boy named Jonas is selected for the position of "Receiver of Memory"—one who preserves memories of things that have been gotten rid of by Sameness, in case the Elders, who lead the community, need help with making decisions.

While he trains with the titular character of the Giver, who is the current receiver, Jonas discovers the dark truths of what goes on within the community. He has problems with the weight of some memories, which nobody else in the community can comprehend.

Within the community, the residents are unable to perceive color. The community also lacks weather and climate variation, as well as having only flat terrain.

The Giver won the 1994 Newbery Medal and has sold more than 50 million copies. In Australia, Yugoslavia, and the United States, it is a part of many middle schools' reading lists, but it also appeared in many challenged book lists, such as the American Library Association's list of most challenged books of the 2000s.

=== Gathering Blue ===
Gathering Blue is a 2000 young adult novel that is set in the same future time period and displays some of the same themes as The Giver, to which it is the sequel.

The central character, Kira, who has a deformed leg, is orphaned and must learn to survive in a society that normally leaves the weak or disabled exposed to die in the fields. Kira's father was thought to have been taken by the Beasts while he was on a hunt before she was born. Kira's mother had died recently from a mysterious illness.

Since she is an orphan, Kira needs a reason for the Council of Edifice to keep her in the village, rather than to send her to the Field, which would mean certain death at the hands of the Beasts. Kira's mother did embroidery for the Council and taught Kira some of her craft. Kira's embroidery skill convinces the Council to keep her around to mend and update a beautiful robe, which shows the society's history. She begins to learn the art of dyeing threads different colors except for blue, which nobody in her community knows how to make except Annabella, Kira's mentor.

Kira also learns more about the truth of her village and the terrible secrets that it holds. She then finds her father, who tells the truth of what happened to him and about the Village he now lives in.

=== Messenger ===
Messenger is a 2004 young adult novel that takes place about six years after The Giver and about seven years after Gathering Blue.

Set in an isolated community, known simply as Village, it focuses on Matty, after leaving the community from Gathering Blue, who serves as a message bearer through the ominous and lethal Forest that surrounds the community. Matty discovers a supernatural gift, and his journey involves protecting his friends and confronting the immoral activity in the Village.

=== Son ===
Son is a 2012 young adult novel that follows Claire, Gabriel's birthmother, who embarks on a harrowing and dangerous journey to eventually locate Gabriel. In this book, Gabriel has gained a supernatural ability, known as "veering", that allows him to view the thoughts of other people.

== Film adaptation ==
A film adaptation of the first book was produced by The Weinstein Company and Walden Media. It was released on August 15, 2014, and starred Jeff Bridges as the Giver, Brenton Thwaites as Jonas and Meryl Streep as the Chief Elder.
