= Anastasia Has the Answers =

1986 novel by Lois Lowry

- Author: Lois Lowry
- Cover artist: Diane deGroat
- Language: English
- Series: The Anastasia Series
- Genre: Young adult
- Publisher: Houghton Mifflin Harcourt
- Publication date: 1986
- Publication place: United States
- Media type: Print
- Pages: 123
- ISBN: 978-0-395-41795-9
- OCLC: 13122992
- LC Class: PZ7.L9673 Amg 1986
- Preceded by: Anastasia on Her Own
- Followed by: Anastasia's Chosen Career

Anastasia Has the Answers is a 1986 young adult novel by Lois Lowry. It is the sixth of a series of books that Lowry wrote about Anastasia and her younger brother Sam.

== Critical reception ==
Carolyn Noah of the Worcester Public Library in Massachusetts reviewed the book in the School Library Journal. She highlights how each chapter begins with Anastasia's attempt at describing events in a journalistic manner, a feature unique to this book in the series. She further explains: "The language in Lowry's stories about Anastasia is always natural, but ... Answers also benefits from this stylistic variation. The surrounding characters, from baby brother Same playing funeral on the floor to bereaved "Clark Gablish" Uncle George are colorful and quirky and distinct. [...] The story's other elements fall, quite literally, into their own likely and lively places. Not only does Anastasia have the answers, but she's at the top of her form."
