= The Gossamer Project =

Group of specialty archives

The Gossamer Project is a group of specialty archives that, combined, contain the vast majority of X-Files fan fiction on the Internet. In the mid to late 1990s, the Gossamer Archives/Project was one of the "big three" single media fandom-focused archives on the Internet, and remained the largest single fandom fan fiction archive until the emergence of various Harry Potter archives in the early 2000s.

As of April 2007, the archive contains 35,192 database entries, with stories dated from May 1995 through April 2007.

== History ==
=== First archive ===
The original Gossamer Archive was opened on May 4, 1995 by Vincent Juodvalkis after mirroring files from all the older FTP sites which collected stories from alt.tv.x-files.creative (ATXC) Usenet newsgroup. He began collecting/archiving all fan fiction posted to ATXC, and later, from the X-Files Fan Fiction mailing list. In early 1996, an FTP mirror site was set up at the Free University of Berlin, maintained by Vera. In April 1996, Vincent posted to ATXC that his archive was receiving over 100,000 hits per week. Because he was worried that the bandwidth consumption was having a negative effect on Ohio-State's network, he was considering solutions, including moving the archive to a commercial site and selling advertising space on the front page to pay for the heavy-duty bandwidth and disk space (235 MB) requirements.On July 3, 1996, Vincent announced the projected shutdown of the Ohio-State site, citing a lack of time and network saturation.

=== Revival ===
During the summer of 1996, several alternative sites were created, including Stef Davies's UK site, Adam Lee's Australian site, and Harri Nyman's Finnish site. On August 12 of that year, Natasha (aka Kelsy) began the "Gossamer Project", a project to database, categorize and summarize all the currently archived stories. Originally, her site was only a collection of HTML links to the other archives, but when she found a US-based server willing to host a site with the disk and bandwidth requirements of Gossamer, she launched a full US mirror site. By early 1997, most of the other archive attempts had consolidated under the Gossamer Project umbrella, generally using the database and HTML page generation scripts created by Natasha. Several types of files, including unfinished stories and specialty files (poems, filks, non-fiction) were separated to their own sites. In February 1997, the site on the X-Philes.com server was created as a test site for improvements to the Gossamer database and page generation scripts. On May 31, 1997, Natasha announced the closure of the Gossamer USA (Simplenet) site, and her retirement from archiving.

=== Reorganization ===
In June 1997, the Gossamer Project was reorganized. Gossamer X-Philes was opened for public access, and Gossamer Simplenet was handed over to Deirdre from Natasha. Lisa (Gossamer Birdfeeder/story cleanup), Adam (Gossamer Australia), Deirdre (Gossamer Simplenet/story cleanup), Chael (Gossamer X-Philes/technical), Harri (Gossamer Finland), Vera (Gossamer FTP), Amy (Specialty Archive), Michelle (Unfinished and Serial Archive), and Gem (Database Administrator) took over maintenance. The archives were fully integrated, using the same database of files, containing the same story files, and posting story updates at around the same time. On November 1, 1997, Gossamer Australia closed and Adam Lee retired from archiving. On February 10, 1998, the gossamer.org domain name was registered, although it was not fully used by the Gossamer Project for another year. In May 1998, after the site was featured in the Yahoo!Life magazine, the site located on the Simplenet.com network was shut down due to its bandwidth usage. The site was moved to Interspeed.com, which then shut it down again for bandwidth consumption 2 weeks later. In May 1998, Gossamer was listed in an article in the Yahoo!Life print magazine, and experienced a traffic spike to over 60,000 hits per site, per day. Two weeks later, Gossamer Simplenet was forced to close by simplenet.com due to the excessive traffic. The site moved to Interspeed.net temporarily, but was shut down again due to excessive traffic within 14 days. On July 12, 1998, Gossamer Germany (Germany.gossamer.org) was opened on the FU Berlin network that had hosted the Gossamer FTP archive since 1996. The name choice proved to be a bad decision, as many US-based fans refuse to use a site obviously located in Europe due to concerns about speed and access. In August 1998, a script forbidding deep linking was deployed on the X-Philes.com server, when it was discovered that (a) the site's bandwidth was too high for its host's liking and (b) that 30% of the bandwidth was being consumed via deep links directly to fan fiction text files from other sites in the community. This script was later deployed to all active Gossamer sites to prevent the bandwidth issues associated with deep linking.On April 1, 1999, all archive names based on networks or locations were retired. Fluky, Krycek, and Skinner archives were opened as subdomains under the primary gossamer.org domain name. From June 1998 – 2000, the Gossamer Project was booted from other servers due to bandwidth consumption and other related issues. Due to a 1999 decision to group all sites under the gossamer.org domain and "redeploy" the same subdomains to new servers, the loss of these various servers did not impact the user community as earlier shutdowns had. During late 1999 and early 2000, the Gossamer archives received, on average, 1,000 direct e-mail, newsgroup and mailing list submissions a month. The archiving team fell behind for many months, resulting in more than 8,000 files being archived during 2000. From that high water point, the submissions rate has gradually fallen to a current rate of about 600 submissions per year. From 2000-2007, there have been several archive moves, but few events that have had long-term effects on the archive or readers. In 2001, the Gossamer Skinner name was retired and eventually replaced by Gossamer Tooms, due to the unreliability of the servers that had hosted Skinner over the years and to note the acquisition of a commercial dedicated server for Gossamer usage.

== In the media ==
During the late 1990s, the Gossamer Project was noted and discussed in several major media outlets, generally in lifestyle articles focused on the media fan fiction phenomenon emerging online. On August 18, 1997, the Gossamer Project was discussed in an article in the New York Times which focused specifically on the X-Files fan fiction online. This article included a description of the archive, and the article's primary image was the front page of the site. In May 1998, the Gossamer Project was highlighted in a fandom-focused edition of Yahoo!Life, resulting in an extreme increase of traffic to the sites. While this brought attention to the site, it also resulted in negative effects, including the most popular mirror site being removed from the server it had been on for several years due to bandwidth abuse. In later 1998, the Gossamer Project was mentioned as the primary X-Files fan fiction archive online in an article in Pitch Magazine. In the December 1, 1998 edition of Entertainment Weekly, the Gossamer Project was mentioned in the Writers Bloc sidebar for the article Fan Fiction: Out of Character by E. Klotz and the front page used as the primary image for that section. The Gossamer Project was also mentioned in the April 29, 2001 article The E-Files, by Nancy Schulz, published in The Washington Post.

== Online Discussions about Gossamer ==
In recent years, the Gossamer Project has become a touchpoint for nostalgic discussions among fans about "the way things were" before the emergence of FanFiction.net and the ongoing decentralization of single fandoms amongst many sites and forums. The Gossamer Project and the X-Files community represent what is now considered an old style, online fan fiction community: centralized around an archive and a few posting forums, making it easy to find and access the majority of fan fiction posted in that community.

In the online article Once upon a time . . . What fragmentation in fandom means to you by LJC, media fandom in the mid to late 1990s is described as:

It was the age of The Gossamer Project, alt.startrek.creative, and LISTSERVs. It was a simple world, a happy world, a world before bandwidth and advertising revenues ruled the Internet. When it was easy for fans to find what they wanted, because there were huge glowing neon signs pointing them towards Mecca at every bend and fork in the road. We were all pilgrims on the same road.

and specifically refers to the Gossamer Project existence today:

The Gossamer Project began in the spring of 1995, and survives today by mirroring to avoid bandwidth hell. It is still the #1 place the majority of fans read fan fiction for X-Files, and continues to grow due to longevity and brand awareness. Everyone knows about it, and everyone can find it. It's got one helluva big neon sign that shines awful bright.

The Gossamer example has had effects on other fan fiction communities, with many archives describing themselves as the "Gossamer" of their fandom, or with readers looking for the "Gossamer" of the fandom. In the blog post, Confessional, on the blog A Southern Girl's Guide to Almost Anything, the writer bemoans the lack of centralization she was finding in Star Trek: The Next Generation fandom by asking "Was there no organization in that fandom? Where's their Gossamer, the X-Files massive fanfic archive?!"

== Academic Discussions about Gossamer ==
In the paper Coming Out as a Fanfiction Writer presented at the Western Australian Science Fiction Conference in 2001, the Gossamer Project is used, along with FanFiction.net, as an example of one of the largest online fan fiction archives.

The Gossamer archive for X-Files fanfiction (probably the largest fanfiction archive on the internet for a singular show/ movie/ book and probably the largest fanfiction archive next to Fanfiction.net, has approximately 25,000 stories on the archive. Nine thousand of those stories were received in the year 2000 (the archive started in 1994/5) The archivists add anywhere from 400 - 900 stories an update and the updates happen about twice a month.

In an article entitled "Gender and Fan Culture (Round Eight, Part One): Abigail Derecho and Christian McCrea" posted to Henry Jenkins's blog on July 26, 2007, the Gossamer Project sites and its sister project Ephemeral and their impact on online fandom and fannish history were discussed:

For all who might think that posting X-Files fanfic to the ATXC board did not really constitute a technological innovation, I say this: the ATXC and its successor, the Ephemeral/Gossamer archival system, have proven over the last dozen years that a simple open-source PHP archive of HTML documents will outlast a lot of other hypermedia creations. While gamers hunt down emulators, fans of hypertext literature long for a working installation disk of Mac Classic OS, and digital historians cry over numerous broken links and four-year-old Flash animation that just never loads all the way, readers of online fan fiction sit back and enjoy the plain-and-simple HTML, reliably archived and presented in neat rows and columns for their pleasurable consumption for years to come. If that isn't technical genius, I don't know what is.
