= Son (novel) =

2012 novel by Lois Lowry

- Author: Lois Lowry
- Language: English
- Series: The Giver Quartet
- Genre: Young adult fiction
- Publisher: HarperCollins
- Publication date: October 2, 2012
- Publication place: United States
- Media type: Print (hardback)
- Pages: 393
- ISBN: 978-0-54788-720-3
- Preceded by: Messenger

Son is a 2012 young adult dystopian novel by American author Lois Lowry. The fourth and final book in The Giver Quartet, the story takes place during and after the first book in the series, The Giver. The story follows Claire, the Birthmother of Gabriel, who was marked for "release" in The Giver before being taken out of the community by Jonas. Claire, obsessed with finding her son, embarks on a journey out of the community in an attempt to follow and find him. The novel explores themes of love, obligation, sacrifice, and loss. Son received mostly positive reviews from critics.

== Plot ==
Son is written in three parts, each with a subtitle: Before, Between, and Beyond.

=== Before ===
Before takes place in the same location, "The Community," and at approximately the same time as The Giver. Claire's assigned occupation in the community is Birthmother, and her primary responsibility is to give birth. At the beginning of the novel, Claire is nearing the end of her pregnancy. She gives birth to her child at 14, but complications during delivery necessitate birth by cesarean section. Three weeks after giving birth, Claire reports to the birthing unit office and is reassigned to work at the Fish Hatchery. After she leaves, she inquires after the baby she birthed, and the officer informs her that the baby is healthy and accidentally informs Claire that the child is male and number Thirty-Six in his year.

Claire retains curiosity for her son as she begins work at the Fish Hatchery and begins casually volunteering at the infant nurturing center to see him. As she plays with Thirty-Six, she quickly grows to love him, a feeling she finds that she alone experiences. She later realizes that all adult community members take pills that suppress emotions. As a Birthmother, she was instructed not to take the pills, but the matter was overlooked in her reassignment. Claire is told that Thirty-Six is going "Elsewhere" for his failure to thrive according to the community's standards. Before she can do anything, her son is saved and taken away by Jonas, the protagonist from The Giver. Claire attempts to follow them on a supply boat, but it soon encounters a strong storm and is shipwrecked.

=== Between ===
In Between, Claire is rescued from the beach on which the supply boat shipwrecked. She is taken in by a midwife, Alys, while she tries to regain her memory, since she has suffered from temporary amnesia after the wreck. Once her memories return, Lame Einar is a man who trains her to be able to escape the village they are in. She is forced to climb a steep cliff up out of the valley. Lame Einar tried climbing out of the village and lost his legs due to an evil entity Claire must meet, Trademaster, which offers to take her to her son if she trades her youth. Claire agrees and is turned into an old woman, and her son, Gabriel "Gabe", is located.

=== Beyond ===
In Beyond, Gabe is now a young man with the power to see into other people's minds for a split second, "veering." Gabe is also curious about his old home and his real mother.

Meanwhile, Jonas notices Claire, finds out that she is the mother of Gabe, and convinces Gabe that Claire is his mother, aged by the evil Trademaster.

Gabe is then told that the Trademaster must be killed. He meets the Trademaster, veers into its body, and understands that the Trademaster is dying from starvation because he feeds off his victims' suffering. Gabe then tells the Trademaster of all the people that he has tried to destroy and how they are living happily again. That destroys the Trademaster, and when Gabe returns home, Claire has turned back into a young woman.

== Themes and development ==
Themes in Son include those of love, obligation, sacrifice, and loss. Lowry had originally not planned on writing Son or any sequels to The Giver, but she was inspired to write the story after she "decided to describe what became of him [Gabriel] as he grew up." Initially intending to center the book on Gabriel and his determination to discover his past, Lowry instead found herself being drawn to write more about Claire. She stated, "I wasn't aware of it at the time... but when I was writing of her yearning to find her boy, that was coming out of my own yearning to have my own son back."

== Critical reception ==
Reception for Son has been mostly positive, with the book gaining starred reviews from Kirkus Reviews and Booklist. A reviewer for The Washington Post wrote that the book had a "quiet climax", stating that the ultimate "power of this parable" is that "It confronts us with some of the choices we are making and plays out the consequences." Robin Wasserman of The New York Times commented that Son did well as a standalone novel and praised Lowry's descriptions in the book. The Boston Globe criticized the book's "over-elaborations and pacing" while writing that "overall the journey is still worth the effort". The AV Club commented that while the book could have used more world-building, it is also "just plain good young-adult literature".
