= Anastasia Krupnik =

Novel by Lois Lowry

- Author: Lois Lowry
- Cover artist: Diane deGroat
- Language: English
- Series: The Anastasia Series
- Genre: Young adult
- Publisher: Houghton Mifflin
- Publication date: 1979
- Publication place: United States
- Media type: Print
- Pages: 133
- ISBN: 978-0395286296
- OCLC: 5170336
- Dewey Decimal: 813.54
- LC Class: PZ7.L9673 An
- Followed by: Anastasia Again!

Anastasia Krupnik is a 1979 novel and the first book of a popular series of middle-grade novels by Lois Lowry, depicting the title character's life as a girl "just trying to grow up." Anastasia deals with everyday problems such as popularity, the wart on her thumb or the new arrival of her little brother, Sam. The book is written in episodic fashion, each chapter self-contained with minimal narrative link to the others. At the end of each chapter is a list written by Anastasia, listing her likes and dislikes, showing the character's growth and development through the story.

The Anastasia Krupnik series was 29th on the American Library Association's "The 100 Most Frequently Challenged Books of 1990–2000" for reasons such as references to beer, Playboy magazine, and a casual reference to a character wanting to kill herself. The series was also criticized because one novel of the series featured Anastasia replying to a personal ad and lying about her age and her life to an older man; however, the two never have any romantic experiences and when they meet, the man has no idea Anastasia is the woman to whom he had been writing.

The book was adapted for the stage by Meryl Friedman and premiered "in 1998 at Chicago's Lifeline Theatre, where Friedman was a founder and producing director". It has been performed many places elsewhere, including Burbank, California in 1999 and Sacramento, California in 2013.

== Books ==
- Anastasia Krupnik, published October 24, 1979 by Houghton Mifflin Harcourt
  - Dorothy Canfield Fisher Children's Book Award Nominee (1981)
  - California Young Readers Medal Nominee for Intermediate (1984)
- Anastasia Again!, published October 15, 1982 by Yearling Books
  - Dorothy Canfield Fisher Children's Book Award Nominee (1983)
  - National Book Award for Children's Fiction Finalist (1983)
- Anastasia at Your Service, published December 1, 1983 by Dell Publishing
  - Dorothy Canfield Fisher Children's Book Award Nominee (1984)
- Anastasia, Ask Your Analyst, published June 1, 1985 by Yearling Books
- Anastasia on Her Own, published June 1, 1986 by Yearling Books
- Anastasia Has the Answers, published April 28, 1986 by Houghton Mifflin Harcourt
  - Dorothy Canfield Fisher Children's Book Award Nominee (1988)
- Anastasia's Chosen Career, published October 26, 1987 by Houghton Mifflin Harcourt
- Anastasia at This Address, published July 1, 1992 by Yearling Books
- Anastasia, Absolutely, published October 30, 1995 by Yearling Books
