= The Giver =

1993 novel by Lois Lowry

- First edition (1993)
- Author: Lois Lowry
- Cover artist: Cliff Nielsen
- Language: English
- Series: The Giver Quartet
- Genre: Young adult fiction, Dystopian novel, Science fiction
- Publisher: Houghton Mifflin Harcourt
- Publication date: 1993
- Publication place: United States
- Awards: Newbery Medal
- ISBN: 0-553-57133-8 (hardback and paperback edition)
- LC Class: PS 3562 O923 G58 1993
- Followed by: Gathering Blue

The Giver is a 1993 young adult dystopian novel written by American author Lois Lowry. In the novel, society has taken away pain and strife by converting to "Sameness", a plan that has also eradicated emotional depth from their lives. In an effort to preserve order, the society has a true sense of equality and lacks any color, climate, or terrain. The protagonist of the story, a 12-year-old boy named Jonas, is selected to inherit the position of Receiver of Memory, the person who stores all the memories of the time before Sameness. Jonas struggles with concepts of the new emotions and things introduced to him, and whether they are inherently good, evil, or in between, and whether it is possible to have one without the other.

The Giver won the 1994 Newbery Medal and has sold more than 12 million copies worldwide. A 2012 survey by School Library Journal designated it as the fourth-best children's novel of all time. It has been the subject of a large body of scholarly analysis, with academics considering themes of memory, religion, color, eugenics and utopia within the novel. In Australia, Canada, and the United States, it is required on many core curriculum reading lists in middle school, but it is also frequently challenged. It ranked #11 on the American Library Association list of the most challenged books of the 1990s, ranked #23 in the 2000s, and ranked #61 in the 2010s.

The novel is the first in a loose quartet of novels known as The Giver Quartet, with three subsequent books set in the same universe: Gathering Blue (2000), Messenger (2004), and Son (2012). In 2014, a film adaptation was released, starring Jeff Bridges, Meryl Streep, and Brenton Thwaites and directed by Philip Noyce.

== Plot ==
Jonas, a 12-year-old boy, lives in a community isolated from all except a few similar towns, where everyone has an assigned role. With the annual Ceremony of Twelve upcoming, he is nervous, as he will be assigned his life's work by the Community's leaders, the Committee of Elders. He is reassured by his father, a Nurturer (who cares for the infants in the Community) and his mother, a high-ranking official in the Department of Justice.

During the ceremony, Jonas is assembled with his classmates. The Chief Elder, who presides, initially does not call Jonas. After everyone else is called, the Chief Elder explains that Jonas was not given a normal assignment, but instead has been selected as the next "Receiver of Memory", to be trained by the current one, who sits among the Elders and shares unusual pale eyes with Jonas. The position has high status and responsibility, and Jonas quickly finds himself growing distant from his classmates, including his close friends. The rules Jonas receives further separate him, as they allow him no time with his friends and require him to keep his training secret. They also allow him to lie and withhold his feelings from his family, which are generally not allowed in the Community.

Once he begins, Jonas discovers the purpose of his position: the Receiver retains the memories from all of history and is the only one allowed access to books outside of permitted text. The current Receiver, who asks Jonas to call him the Giver, begins transferring those memories to Jonas, as those in the Community know nothing of the past. These memories, as well as restricted books, give the Receiver perspective to advise the Council of Elders. The first memory is of sliding down a snow-covered hill on a sled, shocking Jonas as he has never seen a sled, snow, or a hill. These memories have been given up, assuring security and conformity (called Sameness). Even color has been surrendered, and the Giver shows Jonas a rainbow. He gives Jonas darker memories of hunger and war. The Giver reveals he previously had an apprentice, named Rosemary, but does not reveal her fate.

Jonas's father is concerned about an infant at the Nurturing Center who is failing to thrive, and receives special permission to bring him home at night. The baby's name will be Gabriel if he grows strong enough to be assigned to a family. He has pale eyes, like Jonas and the Giver. Jonas grows attached to him, especially when Jonas finds that he can receive memories. If Gabriel does not recover, he will be "released from the Community"—in common speech, taken Elsewhere. This has happened to individuals deemed unfit for the Community, including the elderly, chronic rule breakers, and Rosemary. The Giver shows Jonas a secret video of Jonas's father doing his job: releasing the smaller of two identical twin newborns through a lethal injection before putting the infant in a trash chute, since identical community members are forbidden. This causes Jonas to learn that those who are "released" are actually killed.

Believing his father is a murderer, Jonas initially refuses to return home, but the Giver convinces him that without the memories, the people of the Community cannot know right versus wrong. Rosemary was unable to endure the darker memories and instead killed herself with poison. Jonas and the Giver devise a plan to return the Community's memories. Both agree that Jonas will leave, thereby returning the memories to them, while the Giver will stay to help them learn to live with their memories before joining his daughter, Rosemary, in death. They plan to fake Jonas's drowning to limit the search for him, but he instead escapes in a rush with Gabriel upon learning of the child's imminent release. The two are near death from cold and starvation when they reach the border of what Jonas believes must be Elsewhere. Using his mysterious ability to "see beyond", he finds a sled at the top of a snowy hill. He and Gabriel ride the sled down towards a house filled with colored lights and a Christmas tree, and for the first time he hears something he believes must be music. The ending is ambiguous, with Jonas experiencing symptoms of hypothermia.

At the 2009 National Book Festival, Lowry joked during a Q&A: "Jonas is alive, by the way. You don't need to ask that question."

== Background ==
Lowry has stated that her books all explore "the importance of human connection… the vital need for humans to be aware of their interdependence, not only with each other, but with the world and its environment." Like Lowry's other books, The Giver shows changes in the characters' lives, reflecting this fascination in the multifaceted dimensions of growing up.

The Giver was initially inspired by Lowry's interaction with her father, who, in his senility, kept forgetting about the long-ago death of her sister; she imagined "a novel in which people are deprived of the memories of suffering, grief, and pain." She based the novel's setting in part on the closely guarded army bases in which she had grown up, her father having been an army dentist. She has stated that the characters in The Giver have lived in a sterile world for so long that they are in danger of losing the real emotions that make them human.

== Analysis of themes ==
=== Memory ===
Bradford et al. argue that The Giver represents a community where the lack of cultural memory leads to an inability to avoid societal mistakes, preventing the community from becoming a true Utopia, thus conferring transformational potential on human memory. Hanson interprets the restriction of memory as totalitarian and argues that Lowry demonstrates the emancipatory potential of memory in The Giver. Triplett and Han suggest that Jonas's role as receiver of memory, allowing him a deeper understanding of his societal and cultural context, demonstrates the validity of suspicious methods of reading that attempt to obtain deeper meanings.

=== Religion ===
Bradford et al. suggest The Giver's depiction of Christmas at the novel's end implies that an ideal community is in part represented by a family Christmas, therefore situating the novel as conservative. Graeme Wend-Walker, an academic, analyzed the then-trilogy in 2013 through a post-secular lens and suggested that removing religion entirely from human society and lives could diminish humanity's capacity for accepting differences instead of providing human liberation as some may assume. Countering Bradford's claim, which would suggest that the novel is conservative due to its religious imagery and undertones, Wend-Walker's post-secular reading suggests that the novel explores the ambiguity between the secular and religious binary which provides it progressive potential by allowing for the transformative potential of the spiritual.

=== Color ===
Susan G. Lea has emphasized that sameness is crucial to the world of The Giver, and furthermore that their monochromatic vision creates a color blindness within the community that cannot be aware of the effects of the absence of color. She likens the lack of difference and literal color blindness of The Giver's community with color blind attitudes that act as if racial difference does not exist, and suggests that the book shows the way that colorblindness erases people of color and their experiences through their lack of visibility. Kyoungmin and Lee examine Jonas's growing ability to see color instead of the lack of color in his community and argue that his selfhood grows as his memory and perception of color grow. They suggest that Jonas's full perception of color at the end is what allows him to choose to travel elsewhere as an autonomous agent in comparison to others in his community.

=== Eugenics and gene editing ===
Elizabeth Bridges reads an implication of gene editing in the development of the homogenous community, based on euphemistic language throughout the novel. She suggests that the release of those who do not fit societal conventions represents the ways that eugenics were employed by the society of The Giver. Robert Gadowski suggests that government control of bodies inhibits the society's freedoms. He argues that through bio-technical planning, people's bodies become vehicles of state control instead of the locus of their autonomy.

== Literary significance and reception ==
In the United States, The Giver has become frequently assigned as reading in schools, as well as library-sponsored reading clubs and "City Reads" programs.

However, reviewers have commented that the story lacks originality and is not likely to stand up to the sort of probing literary criticism used in "serious" circles. Others argue that the book's appeal to a young-adult audience is critical for building a developing reader's appetite for reading. Karen Ray, writing in The New York Times, detects "occasional logical lapses", but adds that the book "is sure to keep older children reading". Young adult fiction author Debra Doyle was more critical, stating that "Personal taste aside, The Giver fails the [science fiction] Plausibility Test," and that "Things are the way they are [in the novel] because The Author is Making A Point; things work out the way they do because The Author's Point Requires It."

Children's author Natalie Babbitt, writing in The Washington Post called the novel "a warning in narrative form," saying: "The story has been told before in a variety of forms—Ray Bradbury's Fahrenheit 451 comes to mind—but not, to my knowledge, for children. It's well worth telling, especially by a writer of Lowry's great skill. If it is exceedingly fragile—if, in other words, some situations do not survive that well-known suspension of disbelief—well, so be it. The Giver has things to say that cannot be said too often, and I hope there will be many, many young people who will be willing to listen. A review in The Horn Book Magazine stated, "In a departure from her well-known and favorably regarded realistic works, Lois Lowry has written a fascinating, thoughtful science-fiction novel... The story is skillfully written; the air of disquiet is delicately insinuated. And the theme of balancing the virtues of freedom and security is beautifully presented."

=== Censorship in the United States ===
The Giver has been a frequent subject of bans, or attempted bans, in school libraries, due to its dark themes and violence. In a 2020 question-and-answer session, Lowry stated that the calls for banning have usually come from parents and others who have not read the book, but only seen descriptions or out-of-context quotes; and that those who have called for its banning have usually changed their mind after reading it. Lowry has stated that she is against any censorship, and that no literature should be considered off-limits. Some have noted the irony of wanting to censor a novel that warns about societal control of children.

== Awards, nominations, and recognition ==
Lowry won many awards for her work on The Giver, including the following:

- The 1994 Newbery Medal – The John Newbery award (Medal) is given by the Association for Library Service to Children. The award is given for the most distinguished contribution to American literature for children.
- The 1994 Regina Medal
- The 1996 William Allen White Award
- American Library Association listings for "Best Book for Young Adults", "ALA Notable Children's Book", and "100 Most Frequently Challenged Books of 1990–2000."
- A Boston Globe-Horn Book Honor Book
- Booklist Editors' Choice
- A School Library Journal Best Book of the Year

A 2004 study found that The Giver was a common read-aloud book for sixth-graders in schools in San Diego County, California. Based on a 2007 online poll, the National Education Association listed it as one of "Teachers' Top 100 Books for Children". In 2012 it was ranked number four among all-time children's novels in a survey published by School Library Journal.

== Adaptations ==
Oregon Children's Theatre (Portland, Oregon) premiered a stage adaptation of The Giver by Eric Coble in March 2006. Subsequent productions of Coble's one-hour script have been presented in several American theatres.

Another stage adaptation, written by Diana Basmajian, was produced by Prime Stage Theatre in 2006.

Actor Ron Rifkin reads the text for the audiobook edition.

The Lyric Opera of Kansas City and the Minnesota Opera co-commissioned and premiered an opera by Susan Kander based on the novel. It was presented in Kansas City in January and Minneapolis on April 27–29, 2012, and was webcast on May 18, 2012.

In 2017, a stage musical adaptation was in the development stages, with a book by Martin Zimmerman and music and lyrics by Jonah Platt and Andrew Resnick.

HMH Books for Young Readers published a comic book adaptation in spring 2019 illustrated and adapted by Eisner and Harvey Award winner P. Craig Russell.

=== Film adaptation ===
In the fall of 1994, actor Bill Cosby and his ASIS Productions film company established an agreement with Lancit Media Productions to adapt The Giver to film. In the years following, members of the partnership changed and the production team grew in size, but little motion was seen toward making the film. At one point, screenwriter Ed Neumeier was signed to create the screenplay. Later, Neumeier was replaced by Todd Alcott and Walden Media became the central production company.

Jeff Bridges has said he had wanted to make the film for nearly 20 years, and originally wanted to direct it with his father Lloyd Bridges in the title role. The elder Bridges' 1998 death cancelled that plan and the film languished in development hell for another 15 years. Warner Bros. bought the rights in 2007 and the film adaptation was finally given the green light in December 2012. Jeff Bridges plays the title character with Brenton Thwaites in the role of Jonas. Meryl Streep, Katie Holmes, Odeya Rush, Cameron Monaghan, Alexander Skarsgård and Taylor Swift round out the rest of the main cast. It was released in North America on August 15, 2014.

Awards
Preceded by Missing May	Newbery Medal recipient 1994	Succeeded by Walk Two Moons
Preceded by The Man Who Loved Clowns	Winner of the William Allen White Children's Book Award; 1996	Succeeded by Time For Andrew
