= Rabble Starkey =

1987 novel by Lois Lowry

- First edition
- Author: Lois Lowry
- Language: English
- Genre: Young adult novel
- Publication date: 1987
- Publication place: USA

Rabble Starkey (1987) is a novel by Lois Lowry. It won the 1987 Josette Frank Award.
