= Joseph Wortis =

American psychiatrist (1906–1995)

- Born: 2 October 1906; Brooklyn, New York City, U.S.
- Died: 22 February 1995 (aged 88); White Plains, New York, U.S.
- Education: New York University
- Spouse: Helen Zunser
- Children: Avi
- Relatives: Alan Arkin (nephew)
- Scientific career
- Fields: Psychiatry
- Academic advisors: Havelock Ellis, Adolf Meyer

Joseph Wortis (October 2, 1906 – February 22, 1995) was an American psychiatrist, longtime editor of the scientific journal Biological Psychiatry, and a professor at the State University of New York at Stony Brook. He is remembered today for his book Fragments of an Analysis with Freud.

== Early life ==
Joseph Wortis was born in Brooklyn, New York, one of five children of Jewish immigrant parents (his father Russian-Jewish, his mother French Alsatian-Jewish). He said that he was raised as an "orthodox atheist" and "had no religious identification ... and very little ethnic identification". He attended New York University, where he majored in English literature before switching to pre-med. He graduated in 1927. Accepted into Yale medical school, he went instead to Europe and studied medicine in Vienna (1927-32), Munich and Paris.

== Career ==
Upon returning to the United States, Wortis became a psychiatric resident at Bellevue hospital in New York. In 1934 he married Helen Zunser, the daughter of a prominent New York Jewish literary family. In the same year, funded by a fellowship sponsored by the English psychologist Havelock Ellis, whom Wortis had met while vacationing in England in 1927. His first act in the fellowship was to travel to Vienna to spend 4 months in psychoanalysis with Sigmund Freud. He then studied in Vienna and London until 1940. He published a book about this experience, titled Fragments of an Analysis with Freud, in 1954. "Fragments got mixed reviews, but was mostly neglected".

While in Vienna, he observed Manfred Sakel perform insulin shock therapy of schizophrenia and introduced this treatment subsequently in the United States. For his book Soviet Psychiatry, Wortis visited the Soviet Union and taught himself Russian. Because of this, he was investigated by the United States Senate Subcommittee on Internal Security in 1953. Over his career, Wortis worked at several hospitals and medical schools, including Johns Hopkins School of Medicine, the Columbia University College of Physicians and Surgeons, and the New York University School of Medicine. Wortis was the founding editor of the journal Biological Psychiatry in 1965 and remained in this function until 1992. Wortis died in 1995 at the age of 88. A year before he died, he was interviewed by Todd Dufresne, who found Wortis at age 87 "active, lucid, and intellectually engaging".
