= Insulin shock therapy =

Psychiatric treatment

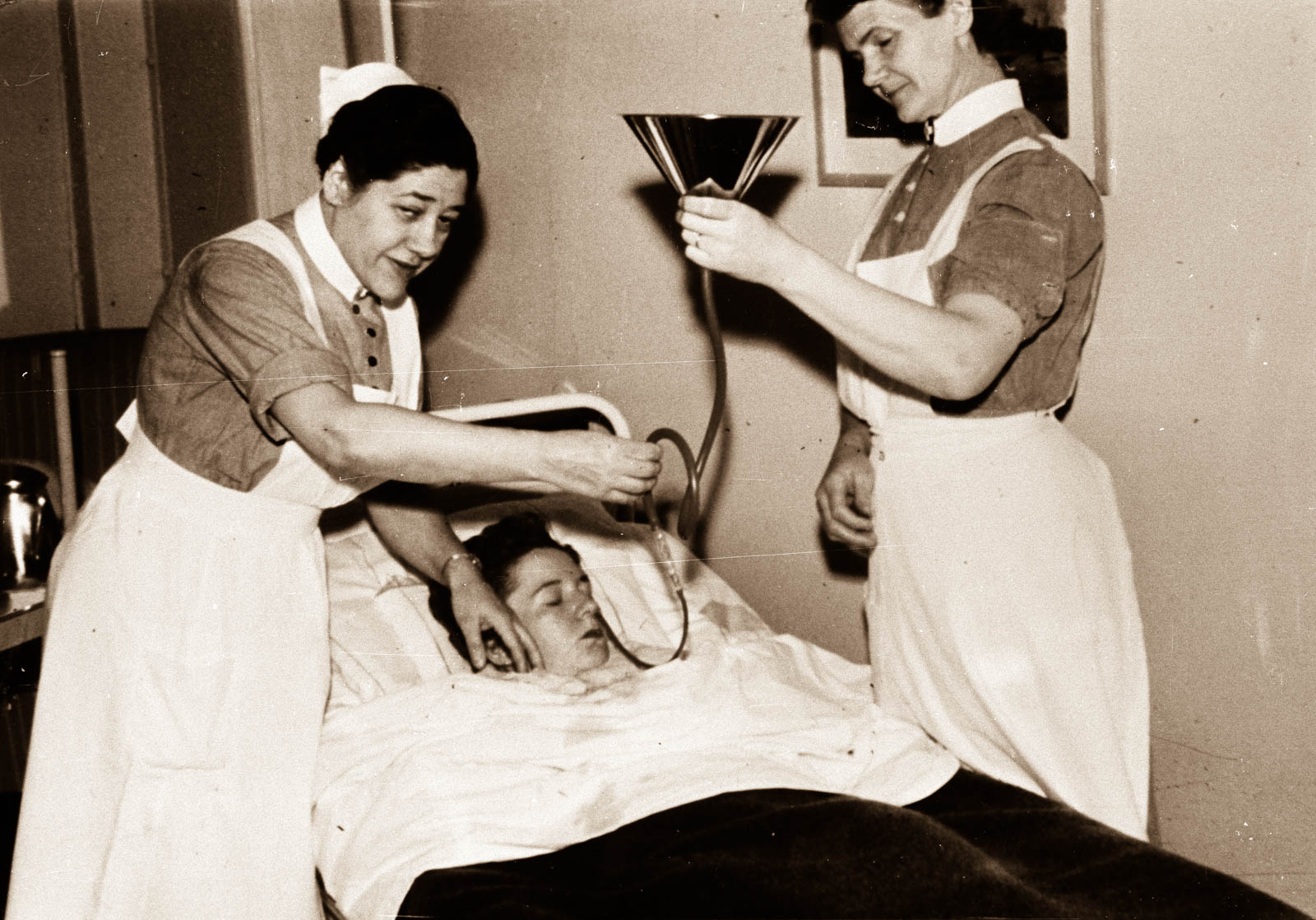
- Insulin shock therapy administered in Långbro Hospital, Stockholm in the 1930s
- ICD-9-CM: 94.24
- MeSH: D003295

Insulin shock therapy or insulin coma therapy was a form of psychiatric treatment in which patients were repeatedly injected with large doses of insulin in order to produce daily comas over several weeks. It was introduced in 1927 by Austrian-American psychiatrist Manfred Sakel and used extensively in the 1940s and 1950s, mainly for schizophrenia, before falling out of favour and being replaced by neuroleptic drugs in the 1960s.

It was one of a number of physical treatments introduced into psychiatry in the first four decades of the 20th century. These included the convulsive therapies (cardiazol/metrazol therapy and electroconvulsive therapy), deep sleep therapy, and psychosurgery. Insulin coma therapy and the convulsive therapies are collectively known as the shock therapies.

== Origins ==
In 1927, Sakel, who had recently qualified as a medical doctor in Vienna and was working in a psychiatric clinic in Berlin, began to use low (sub-coma) doses of insulin to treat drug addicts and psychotics, and when one of the patients experienced improved mental clarity after having slipped into an accidental coma, Sakel reasoned the treatment might work for mentally ill patients. Having returned to Vienna, he treated schizophrenic patients with larger doses of insulin in order to deliberately produce coma and sometimes convulsions. Sakel made his results public in 1933, and his methods were soon taken up by other psychiatrists.

Joseph Wortis, after seeing Sakel practice it in 1935, introduced it to the US. British psychiatrists from the Board of Control visited Vienna in 1935 and 1936, and by 1938, 31 hospitals in England and Wales had insulin treatment units. In 1936, Sakel moved to New York and promoted the use of insulin coma treatment in US psychiatric hospitals. By the late 1940s, the majority of psychiatric hospitals in the US were using insulin coma treatment.

== Technique ==
An insulin treatment ward, circa 1951, Roundway Hospital, Devizes, England

Insulin coma therapy was a labour-intensive treatment that required trained staff and a special unit. Patients, who were almost invariably diagnosed with schizophrenia, were selected on the basis of having a good prognosis and the physical strength to withstand an arduous treatment. There were no standard guidelines for treatment. Different hospitals and psychiatrists developed their own protocols. Typically, injections were administered six days a week for about two months.

The daily insulin dose was gradually increased to 100–150 units (1 unit = 34.7 μg) until comas were produced, at which point the dose would be levelled out. Occasionally, doses of up to 450 units were used. After about 50 or 60 comas, or earlier if the psychiatrist thought that maximum benefit had been achieved, the dose of insulin was rapidly reduced before treatment was stopped. Courses of up to 2 years have been documented.

After the insulin injection patients would experience various symptoms of decreased blood glucose: flushing, pallor, perspiration, salivation, drowsiness or restlessness. Sopor and coma—if the dose was high enough—would follow. Each coma would last for up to an hour and be terminated by intravenous glucose or via naso-gastric tube. Seizures occurred before or during the coma. Many would be tossing, rolling, moaning, twitching, spasming or thrashing around.

Some psychiatrists regarded seizures as therapeutic and patients were sometimes also given electroconvulsive therapy or cardiazol/metrazol convulsive therapy during the coma, or on the day of the week when they didn't have insulin treatment. When they were not in a coma, insulin coma patients were kept together in a group and given special treatment and attention. One handbook for psychiatric nurses, written by British psychiatrist Eric Cunningham Dax, instructs nurses to take their insulin patients out walking and occupy them with games and competitions, flower-picking and map-reading, etc. Patients required continuous supervision as there was a danger of hypoglycemic aftershocks after the coma.

In "modified insulin therapy", used in the treatment of neurosis, patients were given lower (sub-coma) doses of insulin.

== Effects ==
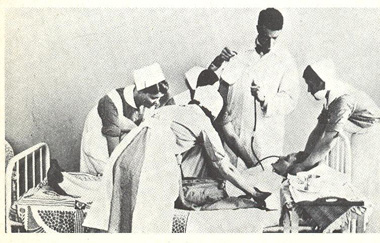
A patient subjected to the practice in Lapinlahti Hospital, Helsinki in the 1950s

A few psychiatrists (including Sakel) claimed success rates for insulin coma therapy of over 80% in the treatment of schizophrenia. A few others argued that it merely accelerated remission in those patients who were undergoing remission anyway. The consensus at the time was somewhere in between, claiming a success rate of about 50% in patients who had been ill for less than a year (about double the spontaneous remission rate) with no influence on relapse.

Sakel suggested the therapy worked by "causing an intensification of the tonus of the parasympathetic end of the autonomic nervous system, by blockading the nerve cell, and by strengthening the anabolic force which induces the restoration of the normal function of the nerve cell and the recovery of the patient." The shock therapies in general had developed on the erroneous premise that epilepsy and schizophrenia rarely occurred in the same patient. The premise was supported by neuropathologic studies that found a dearth of glia in the brains of schizophrenic patients and a surplus of glia in epileptic brains. These observations led the Hungarian neuropsychiatrist Ladislas Meduna to induce seizures in schizophrenic patients with injections of camphor, soon replaced by pentylenetetrazol (Metrazole). Another theory was that patients were somehow "jolted" out of their mental illness.

The hypoglycemia (pathologically low glucose levels) that resulted from insulin coma therapy made patients extremely restless, sweaty, and liable to further convulsions and "after-shocks". In addition, patients invariably emerged from the long course of treatment "grossly obese", probably due to glucose rescue-induced glycogen storage disease. The most severe risks of insulin coma therapy were death and brain damage, resulting from irreversible or prolonged coma respectively. A study at the time claimed that many of the cases of brain damage were actually therapeutic improvement because they showed "loss of tension and hostility". Mortality risk estimates varied from about 1% to 4.9%.

Respected singer-songwriter Townes Van Zandt was said to have lost much of his long-term memory from this treatment, performed on him for bipolar disorder, preceding a life of substance abuse and depression.

== Decline ==
Insulin coma therapy was used in most hospitals in the US and the UK during the 1940s and 1950s. The numbers of patients were restricted by the requirement for intensive medical and nursing supervision and the length of time it took to complete a course of treatment. For example, at one typical large British psychiatric hospital, Severalls Hospital in Essex, insulin coma treatment was given to 39 patients in 1956. In the same year, 18 patients received modified insulin treatment, while 432 patients were given electroconvulsive treatment.

In 1953, British psychiatrist Harold Bourne published a paper entitled "The insulin myth" in the Lancet, in which he argued that there was no sound basis for believing that insulin coma therapy counteracted the schizophrenic process in a specific way. If treatment worked, he said, it was because patients were chosen for their good prognosis and were given special treatment: "insulin patients tend to be an elite group sharing common privileges and perils". Prior to publishing "The insulin myth" in The Lancet, Bourne had tried to submit the article to the Journal of Mental Science; after a 12-month delay, the Journal informed Bourne they had rejected the article, telling him to "get more experience".

In 1957, when insulin coma treatment use was declining, The Lancet published the results of a randomized, controlled trial in which patients were either given insulin coma treatment or identical treatment but with unconsciousness produced by barbiturates. There was no difference in outcome between the groups and the authors concluded that, whatever the benefits of the coma regimen, insulin was not the specific therapeutic agent.

In 1958, American neuropsychiatrist Max Fink published in the Journal of the American Medical Association the results of a random controlled comparison in 60 patients treated with 50 iatrogenic insulin-induced comas or chlorpromazine in doses from 300 mg to 2000 mg/day. The results were essentially the same in relief and discharge ratings but chlorpromazine was safer with fewer side-effects, easier to administer, and better suited to long-term care.

In 1958, Bourne published a paper on increasing disillusionment in the psychiatric literature about insulin coma therapy for schizophrenia. He suggested there were several reasons it had received almost universal uncritical acceptance by reviews and textbooks for several decades despite the occasional disquieting negative finding, including that, by the 1930s when it all started, schizophrenics were considered inherently unable to engage in psychotherapy, and insulin coma therapy "provided a personal approach to the schizophrenic, suitably disguised as a physical treatment so as to slip past the prejudices of the age."

By the 1970s, insulin shock therapy had mostly fallen out of use in the United States, though was still practiced in some hospitals. Its use may have continued longer in China, India, and the Soviet Union.

== Recent writing ==
Recent articles about insulin coma treatment have attempted to explain why it was given such uncritical acceptance. In the US, Deborah Doroshow wrote that insulin coma therapy secured its foothold in psychiatry not because of scientific evidence or knowledge of any mechanism of therapeutic action, but due to the impressions it made on the minds of the medical practitioners within the local world in which it was administered and the dramatic recoveries observed in some patients. Today, she writes, those who were involved are often ashamed, recalling it as unscientific and inhumane. Administering insulin coma therapy made psychiatry seem a more legitimate medical field. Harold Bourne, who questioned the treatment at the time, said: "It meant that psychiatrists had something to do. It made them feel like real doctors instead of just institutional attendants".

One retired psychiatrist who was interviewed by Doroshow "described being won over because his patients were so sick and alternative treatments did not exist". Doroshow argues that "psychiatrists used complications to exert their practical and intellectual expertise in a hospital setting" and that collective risk-taking established "especially tight bonds among unit staff members". She finds it ironic that psychiatrists "who were willing to take large therapeutic risks were extremely careful in their handling of adverse effects". Psychiatrists interviewed by Doroshow recalled how insulin coma patients were provided with various routines and recreational and group-therapeutic activities, to a much greater extent than most psychiatric patients. Insulin coma specialists often chose patients whose problems were the most recent and who had the best prognosis; in one case discussed by Doroshow a patient had already started to show improvement before insulin coma treatment, and after the treatment denied that it had helped, but the psychiatrists nevertheless argued that it had.

=== A Beautiful Mind ===
In 1959, the 1994 winner of the Nobel Memorial Prize in Economic Sciences – John Nash – was diagnosed with schizophrenia and was initially treated at McLean Hospital. When he relapsed, he was admitted to Trenton Psychiatric Hospital in New Jersey. His associates at Princeton University pleaded with the hospital director to have Nash admitted to the insulin coma unit, recognizing that it was better staffed than other hospital units. He responded to treatment and was subsequently medicated with neuroleptics.

Nash's life story was presented in the film A Beautiful Mind, which accurately portrayed the seizures associated with his treatments. In a review of the Nash history, Fink ascribed the success of coma treatments to the 10% of associated seizures, noting that physicians often augmented the comas by convulsions induced by ECT. He envisioned insulin coma treatment as a weak form of convulsive therapy.

=== Other explanations ===
In the UK, psychiatrist Kingsley Jones sees the support of the Board of Control as important in persuading psychiatrists to use insulin coma therapy. The treatment then acquired the privileged status of a standard procedure, protected by professional organizational interests. He also notes that it has been suggested that the Mental Treatment Act 1930 encouraged psychiatrists to experiment with physical treatments.

British lawyer Phil Fennell notes that patients "must have been terrified" by the insulin coma therapy procedures and the effects of the massive overdoses of insulin, and were often rendered more compliant and easier to manage after a course.

Leonard Roy Frank, an American activist from the psychiatric survivors movement who underwent 50 forced insulin coma treatments combined with ECT, described the treatment as "the most devastating, painful and humiliating experience of my life", a "flat-out atrocity" glossed over by psychiatric euphemism, and a violation of basic human rights.

In 2013, French physician-and-novelist Laurent Seksik wrote a historical novel about the tragic life of Eduard Einstein: Le cas Eduard Einstein. He related the encounter between Dr Sakel and Mileva Maric, Albert Einstein's first wife (and Eduard's mother), and the way Sakel's therapy had been given to Eduard, who had schizophrenia.

== Representation in media ==
Like many new medical treatments for diseases previously considered incurable, depictions of insulin coma therapy in the media were initially favorable. In the 1940 film Dr. Kildare's Strange Case, young Kildare uses the new "insulin shock cure for schizophrenia" to bring a man back from insanity. The film dramatically shows a five-hour treatment that ends with a patient eating jelly sandwiches and reconnecting with his wife. In the 1943 film I Walked With a Zombie insulin shock therapy is used in an attempt to cure the titular zombie who has been (mis)diagnosed as suffering from catatonia following a "tropical fever". Other films of the era began to show a more sinister approach, beginning with the 1946 film Shock, in which actor Vincent Price plays a doctor who plots to murder a patient using an overdose of insulin in order to keep the fact that he was a murderer a secret. More recent films include Frances (1982) in which actress Frances Farmer undergoes insulin coma treatment, and A Beautiful Mind, which depicted genius John Nash undergoing insulin treatment. In an episode of the medical drama House M.D., House puts himself in an insulin shock to try to make his hallucinations disappear. Sylvia Plath's The Bell Jar refers to insulin coma therapy in chapter 15. In Kelly Rimmer's book, The German Wife, the character Henry Davis undergoes insulin shock therapy to treat 'combat fatigue'. Russian novelist Eduard Limonov recounts his personal experience being put under insulin shock therapy in his 1986 novel A Young Scoundrel, scenes from which are adapted for film in the 2004 crime comedy-drama It's Russian.

== See also ==
- Deep sleep therapy
- Electroconvulsive therapy
- Manfred Sakel
