= Poppy (novel) =

1995 novel by Avi

- Author: Avi
- Illustrator: Brian Floca
- Series: The Tales Of Dimwood Forest
- Genre: Children's literature
- Published: 1995 (Orchard Books)
- Pages: 192
- Awards: Boston Globe–Horn Book Award (1996)
- ISBN: 0380727692
- Preceded by: Ragweed (prequel; 1999)
- Followed by: Poppy and Rye (1997)

Poppy is a children's novel written by Avi and illustrated by Brian Floca. The novel was first published by Orchard Books in 1995. Poppy is the first-published of Avi's Tales From Dimwood Forest series. Within the narrative sequence of the series, it is the third book. The complete series is composed of Ragweed, Ragweed and Poppy, Poppy, Poppy and Rye, Ereth's Birthday, Poppy's Return, and Poppy and Ereth. In 1996, Poppy received the Boston Globe–Horn Book Award for fiction.

== Background ==
Avi conceived the idea for Poppy while living in Corvallis, Oregon, when his wife was a visiting professor at Oregon State University. At a university bookstore, he found a book entitled One Man's Owl by Bernd Heinrich who described his experience rescuing a baby owlet and nurturing it back to health and into the wild. Avi found the book "fascinating" and decided to write his own novel about an owl named Mr. Ocax. While developing the story, however, Avi's interest shifted towards the mouse that Mr. Ocax planned to eat, and the mouse eventually became the primary focus of the book. Both the book and the mouse were originally named Pip, but after discovering that another children's book existed about a mouse named Pip, he decided to rename the book and the character to Poppy.

== Plot ==
In the Dimwood region, a large family of mice inhabit an abandoned farmhouse called Gray House. Poppy, a young deer mouse, dances with her boyfriend Ragweed, a golden mouse, on Bannock Hill. However, Mr. Ocax, a great horned owl who acts as a tyrannical ruler over the family, attacks them and kills Ragweed. When Poppy returns to Gray House, she learns that the family must relocate to New House, where the food is more abundant. However, Ocax refuses to give the family permission to move to the area, citing Poppy and Ragweed's refusal to ask his permission to go to Bannock Hill. His refusal makes Poppy curious, so she decides to travel to New House herself to investigate.

In Dimwood Forest, Poppy stumbles upon Ereth, a porcupine. Ereth agrees to protect Poppy from Ocax in exchange for the salt lick at New House that he can't obtain on his own. Ereth drops Poppy off at the boundaries of New House, where Poppy discovers that Ocax is afraid of a large artificial owl there. Armed with one of Ereth's quills, Poppy confronts Ocax about the figure but inadvertently reveals that it is fake. Ocax then attacks Poppy but is defeated when Poppy stabs him with the quill. Ocax slams into the salt lick pole, killing him and causing the salt lick to fall to the ground. Ereth retrieves the salt lick, and Poppy goes home to tell her family they are now free from Ocax and able to move. A few moons later she meets and marries Rye, Ragweed's brother. Each night they freely dance on Bannock Hill.

== Reception ==
In 1996, Poppy received the Boston Globe–Horn Book Award for fiction. In a 2017 blog post reflecting on Poppy, Avi wrote that Orchard Books, the original publisher of the book, had been "foundering", and as a result, bookstores were finding it difficult to obtain a copy of Poppy. Referring to the Horn Book Award, Avi wrote that it came in "the proverbial nick of time" and that he has "absolutely no doubt that the award saved Poppy", allowing him to write all the other books in the series. The novel was also listed on the American Library Association's (ALA) Notable Books for Children list in 1996.

Carolyn Phelan, writing in the ALA's Booklist, called Poppy "a good old-fashioned story with an exciting plot, well-drawn characters, and a satisfying ending", noting themes of power among the novel's three main characters: Poppy, who finds courage; Ocax, who oppresses the mice family; and Ragweed, who criticizes Poppy for being cautious. Kirkus Reviews described Poppy as a "cute, but rather standard offering from Avi". The School Library Journal referred to it as a "fast-paced, allegorical animal story", commenting that "the underlying messages, to challenge unjust authority and to rely on logic and belief in oneself, are palatably blended with action and suspense."
