= Biological Psychiatry (journal) =

- Discipline: Biological psychiatry
- Language: English
- Edited by: John H. Krystal

Publication details
- Former name(s): Recent Advances in Biological Psychiatry
- History: 1959–present
- Publisher: Elsevier on behalf of the Society of Biological Psychiatry
- Frequency: Biweekly
- Impact factor: 13.382 (2020)

Standard abbreviations
- ISO 4: Biol. Psychiatry

Indexing
- CODEN: BIPCBF
- ISSN: 0006-3223 (print); 1873-2402 (web)
- LCCN: 78009779
- OCLC no.: 424038458

Links
- Journal homepage; Online access; Journal page at publisher's website

Biological Psychiatry is a biweekly, peer-reviewed, scientific journal of psychiatric neuroscience and therapeutics, published by Elsevier since 1985 on behalf of the Society of Biological Psychiatry, of which it is the official journal. The journal covers a broad range of topics related to the pathophysiology and treatment of major neuropsychiatric disorders. A yearly supplement is published which contains the abstracts from the annual meeting of the Society of Biological Psychiatry.

== History ==
The journal was established in 1959 as Recent Advances in Biological Psychiatry. It obtained its current name in 1969 with volume numbering restarting at 1 and is the official journal of the Society of Biological Psychiatry. The founding editor-in-chief was Joseph Wortis, who edited the journal until 1992. The current editor is John H. Krystal (Yale University School of Medicine). In 2016, a spin-off journal was established: Biological Psychiatry: Cognitive Neuroscience and Neuroimaging (ISSN 2451-9022). In 2021, a second spin-off journal was established: Biological Psychiatry: Global Open Science (ISSN 2667-1743).

== Abstracting and indexing ==
The journal is abstracted and indexed in:

- BIOSIS Previews
- Chemical Abstracts
- Current Contents/Life Sciences
- EMBASE
- Elsevier BIOBASE
- MEDLINE/PubMed
- Mental Health Abstracts
- PsycINFO/Psychological Abstracts
- Referativny Zhurnal
- Science Citation Index
- Scopus

According to the Journal Citation Reports, the journal has a 2019 impact factor of 12.095.

== Editors-in-chief ==
The following persons have been editor-in-chief of the journal:

- Joseph Wortis, 1959–1992
- Wagner H. Bridger, 1992–1997
- Richard C. Josiassen, 1997
- Dennis S. Charney, 1998–2006
- John H. Krystal, 2006–present

== See also ==
- List of psychiatry journals
