= Avi (author) =

American author of children's books (born 1937)

- Born: Edward Irving Wortis; December 23, 1937 (age 88); New York City, U.S.
- Spouse: Linda Cruise Wright
- Parents: Joseph Wortis; Helen Wortis
- Relatives: Alan Arkin (cousin)
- Writing career
- Pen name: Avi
- Notable works: The True Confessions of Charlotte Doyle; Nothing But the Truth; Crispin: The Cross of Lead; Poppy
- Notable awards: Newbery Medal; 2003, Crispin: The Cross of Lead
- Website: www.avi-writer.com

Edward Irving Wortis (born December 23, 1937), better known by the pen name Avi, is an American author of young adult and children's literature. He won the Newbery Medal in 2003 for Crispin: The Cross of Lead, and was a runner-up in 1991 and 1992.

== Biography ==
Avi and his twin sister were born in Brooklyn, New York to Joseph Wortis, an American-Jewish psychiatrist of Russian-Jewish and Alsatian-Jewish descent, and Helen Wortis, a social worker. When he was one year old, his sister gave him the nickname "Avi". Both Avi's grandfathers were writers, and one grandmother was a playwright. In interviews, he recalled his mother reading to him and his sister every night, and going to the public library on Fridays. He is also the first cousin of the Academy Award-winning actor Alan Arkin.

Avi's parents transferred him from Stuyvesant High School to Elisabeth Irwin High School, a smaller private school. At his new school, he studied with a tutor, Ella Ratner, whom he credits for his writing success. He struggled in school due to having dysgraphia, a writing disorder.

Avi has written 80 books, almost entirely for children and young adults. Along with The True Confessions of Charlotte Doyle, he has written books for different age groups and in many different genres including historical fiction, fantasies, graphic novels, comedies, mysteries, ghost stories, adventure tales, realistic fiction, and picture books. Avi has won awards for some of his books, including a Newbery Honor for The True Confessions of Charlotte Doyle in 1991 and another for Nothing but the Truth in 1992. His fiftieth book, Crispin: The Cross of Lead, was awarded the Newbery Medal in 2003. Avi's book Iron Thunder, about the ironclad Monitor and its battle with the CSS Virginia in Hampton Roads, Virginia, was selected as the 2009 Beacon of Freedom Award winner by Williamsburg Regional Library and Colonial Williamsburg Foundation. In 2006, Avi wrote a sequel to Crispin: The Cross of Lead titled Crispin: At the Edge of the World. In the third part of the series, Crispin: The End of Time was published in 2010. His most recent novels, Catch You Later, Traitor and Old Wolf were met with critical success. In 2016, a collection of short stories was published by Candlewick Press, The Most Important Thing: Stories about Sons, Fathers, and Grandfathers. Avi has also written the first-person historical fiction novel "Sophia's War" set in revolutionizing colonial America times.

After living in Providence, Rhode Island in the 1980s and 1990s, Avi now lives in the Rocky Mountains of Colorado, with his wife, Linda Cruise Wright.

== Works ==
=== Standalone works ===
- Scout's Honor
- Things That Sometimes Happen: Very Short Stories for Little Listeners (1970)
- Snail Tale (1972), re-published in 2004 as the End of the Beginning: Being the Adventures of a Small Snail
- No More Magic (1975)
- Captain Grey (1977)
- Emily Upham's Revenge (1978)
- The History of Helpless Harry (1980)
- The Man from the Sky (1980)
- A Place Called Ugly (1981)
- Who Stole the Wizard Of Oz? (1981)
- Sometimes I Think I Hear My Name (1982)
- Devil's Race (1984)
- The Fighting Ground (1984)
- S.O.R. Losers (1984)
- Bright Shadow (1985)
- Wolf Rider (1986)
- Romeo and Juliet, Together (and Alive!) At Last (1987)
- Something Upstairs (1988)
- The Man Who Was Poe (1989)
- The True Confessions of Charlotte Doyle (1990)
- Nothing But the Truth (1991)
- WINDCATCHER (1991)
- Blue Heron (1992)
- Who Was That Masked Man, Anyway? (1992)
- City of Light, City of Dark (1993)
- Punch with Judy (1993)
- The Barn (1994)
- Smugglers' Island (1994)
- Tom, Babette, & Simon: Three Tales of Transformation (1995)
- Beyond the Western Sea, Book 1: The Escape From Home (1996)
- Beyond the Western Sea, Book 2: Lord Kirkle's Money (1996), also published as Beyond the Western Sea, Book 2: Into The Storm
- Finding Providence: the Story of Roger Williams (1997)
- What Do Fish Have To Do with Anything? (1997)
- Perloo the Bold (1998)
- Abigail Takes the Wheel (1999)
- Amanda Joins the Circus (1999)
- Keep Your Eye on Amanda (1999)
- The Christmas Rat (2000)
- City of Orphans (2000)
- Don't You Know There's a War On? (2001)
- The Good Dog (2001)
- Prairie School (2001)
- Secret School (2001)
- The Mayor of Central Park (2003)
- Silent Movie (2003)
- Never Mind: A Twin Novel (2004)
- The Book Without Words (2005)
- Strange Happenings: Five Tales of Transformation (2005)
- Iron Thunder: The Battle Between the Monitor & the Merrimac (2007)
- The Traitors' Gate (2007)
- A Beginning, a Muddle, and an End (2008)
- Hard Gold: The Colorado Gold Rush of 1859 (2008)
- Seer of Shadows (2008)
- Murder At Midnight (2009)
- Sophia's War: a Tale of the Revolution (2012)
- Catch You Later, Traitor (2015)
- Old Wolf (2015)
- The Most Important Thing: Stories About Sons, Fathers, and Grandfathers (2017)
- School of the Dead (2016)
- The Player King (2017)
- The Unexpected Life of Oliver Cromwell Pitts (2017)
- The Button War (2018)
- The End of the World and Beyond (2019)
- Gold Rush Girl (2020)
- Loyalty (2022)
- Lost in the Empire City (2024)
- The Road From Nowhere (2026)

=== Series ===
==== Night Journeys ====
- Night Journeys (1979)
- Encounter at Easton (1980)

==== Dimwood Forest ====
- Poppy (1995)
- Poppy and Rye (1997)
- Ragweed (1999) – prequel to Poppy
- Ereth's Birthday (2000)
- Poppy's Return (2005)
- Poppy and Ereth (2009)
- Ragweed and Poppy (2020) – prequel to Poppy set after Ragweed

==== Beyond the Western Sea ====
- Escape from Home (1996)
- Lord Kirkle's Money: Beyond the Western Sea, Book 2 (1996)

==== Midnight Magic ====
- Midnight Magic (1999)
- Murder at Midnight (2009) – prequel to Midnight Magic
- City of Magic (2022)

==== Crispin ====
- Crispin: the Cross of Lead (2002)
- Crispin at the Edge of the World (2006)
- Crispin: the End of Time (2010)
