= Crispin: The Cross of Lead =

2002 children's novel by Avi

- Cover of the second edition (2002 Elwell illustration, in part)
- Author: Avi (Edward Irving Wortis)
- Illustrator: Ellian DeSonori and Liette Halyn
- Cover artist: Tristan Elwell
- Genre: Young adult novel, historical novel
- Publisher: Hyperion Books for Children
- Publication date: 2002
- Publication place: U.S.
- Media type: Print (hardcover)
- Pages: 262
- ISBN: 0-7868-0828-4 (1st ed., hardcover)
- OCLC: 48559447
- LC Class: PZ7.A953 Cr 2002
- Preceded by: None.
- Followed by: Crispin: At the Edge of the World

Crispin: The Cross of Lead is a 2002 children's novel written by Avi. It was the winner of the 2003 Newbery Medal. Its sequel, Crispin: At the Edge of the World, was released in 2006. The third and currently final book, Crispin: The End of Time, was released in 2010.

== Plot ==
In 1377 A.D. England, a 13-year-old boy, known only as Asta's Son, lives as a peasant in the village of Stromford. The village is part of the territory of the feudal Lord Furnival, which, in Furnival's absence, is under the control of the steward, John Aycliffe. When his mother dies, Asta's Son is left alone, as he has no other known relatives. Shortly afterwards, Aycliffe falsely accuses him of theft and declares him a Wolf's Head, which means he is not considered human anymore, and anyone may kill him. Aycliffe also offers a large reward (twenty shillings) for his death.

Asta's Son turns to the village priest, Father Quinel, his only friend. Father Quinel shows him a lead cross that his mother always prayed with. Father Quinel reveals that his true name is Crispin. He promises to reveal the truth to Crispin about who his father was the next night, but before he can, Aycliffe's men murder him. Aycliffe then sends a boy, Cerdic, to lead Crispin into an ambush, forcing Crispin to flee the village by himself. While fleeing from Aycliffe and his men, Crispin comes across an abandoned village, vanquished by the Black Death, where he meets Orson Hrothgar, known as Bear for his body and strength. Bear claims Crispin for himself, as according to the law that if someone runs away from his master unlawfully, the next free man who finds him may become that person's master. He learns of Crispin's lead cross and notices the writing on it. While Bear does not tell Crispin what the words say, Crispin realizes that the cross and its words are important. Bear is rough with Crispin, but during their travels together, a true bond of friendship develops between them. Bear eventually asks Crispin if he would like to become his apprentice, and Crispin happily agrees.

Posing as a father and son dancer-player duet, the two travel towards the city of Great Wexly, the capital city of Lord Furnival's lands. Bear insists that he has important business to complete there. When they arrive, they find trouble waiting for them. Lord Furnival has died, and John Aycliffe has arrived. Extra guards have been posted at the gates, making entry for Crispin difficult. They soon come up with a plan to continue the dancer-player duet and dance through the gates without an unkind look from anyone. Bear and Crispin stay at The Green Man tavern, which is owned by the Widow Daventry, a friend of Bear. In their room, there is a false wall, which Bear tells Crispin will be his hiding place if things go badly. Bear meets with John Ball, a priest in the city. Soldiers come and raid the secret meeting place of Bear and John Ball, taking Bear, who manages to save everyone else, with them. John Aycliffe had been looking for Crispin, who is hiding. Depressed, Crispin discovers that the writing on the cross states that he is Lord Furnival's son who was born out of wedlock. Crispin tries to get the help of "The Brotherhood", an organization Bear is a member of and headed by John Ball. When they refuse to aid Crispin in trying to find Bear, Crispin takes it upon himself to break into Furnival's palace and find Bear himself.

Crispin finds a dagger in one of the hallways and keeps it under his cloak. He goes into a great room and sees a picture of Lord Furnival, who looks a lot like him. When he finds Aycliffe, Crispin pins him to the ground and puts the dagger to his neck, but instead of killing him, makes him vow under oath that he (Crispin) and Bear will be able to leave Great Wexly unharmed, never to return, in exchange for Crispin's cross of lead. Crispin is led to Bear, who is being kept in the palace's cellar and has been tortured. Though weakened, Bear manages to walk out of the palace on his own. Aycliffe and a band of soldiers escort them to the city gates, where he reneges on his oath and is intent on killing Crispin. A fight ensues between Aycliffe and Bear, who is given the dagger Crispin found at the palace, as the soldiers surround them with their swords drawn. After a back-and-forth battle, Bear eventually squeezes Aycliffe from behind, causing him to drop his sword and dagger. As Bear hurls Aycliffe into the line of soldiers, Aycliffe is impaled by his soldiers' swords and dies. Crispin leaves the cross of lead on Aycliffe's bleeding chest as he and Bear exit the Great Wexly gates. Outside the gate, Bear and Crispin play music and sing, and Bear frees Crispin. Crispin mentions that for the first time, he feels like himself instead of merely Asta's Son.

== Characters ==
- Crispin – A 13-year-old serf and a peasant boy, living in a rural English village called Stromford in 1377. The book is written from his point of view. Son of "Asta" and "Lord Furnival"
- Orson Hrothgar (Bear) – A spy for a secret brotherhood uprising intent on stopping the feudal system. Works as a traveling jester. Came across Crispin shortly after Crispin's escape from Stromford. Bear forced Crispin into an oathed-servitude which led to genuine friendship and Crispin to be his loyal apprentice.
- John Aycliffe – Steward of Stromford and kin of Lady Furnival, attempts to kill Crispin to make sure he keeps his power.
- Widow Daventry – Barmaid at the Green Man Tavern and a friend of Bear, she had seven children and 2 husbands, but they all died from the plague or "The Black Death". Tells Crispin who his real father is.
- Lord Furnival – Lord of a large English territory which includes Stromford. Father of Crispin out of wedlock. Died from wounds sustained in battle while Crispin and Bear were en route to Great Wexly.
- Lady Furnival – The wife of Lord Furnival.
- Father Quinel – Friend to Crispin and his mother and a priest, murdered by John Aycliffe to hide that Crispin's father is Lord Furnival.
- Goodwife Peregrine – Elderly woman in the village, appears to be a very wise and mysterious person. Upon Father Quinel's instruction, she gives Crispin provisions and a pouch for his lead cross as he flees Stromford.
- Cerdic – A boy that tricks Crispin into a trap, he is about Crispin's age, nothing else is really known about him.
- John Ball – The only historical figure who plays a small role—he and his group prepare for their Peasants' Revolt
- The One-Eyed Man – A young man that was teased by Bear, and later helps soldiers arrest him
- Asta – Crispin's mother and the youngest daughter of Lord Douglas. Forced to live as a serf when Crispin was born out of wedlock by Lord Furnival. Her death initiated the main plot of this story.
- Lord Douglas – Asta's father

== Reception ==
According to Kirkus Reviews, "The characters are somewhat less well-developed [than the setting]; although the revolutionary and frequently profane Bear is a fascinating treasure, Crispin himself lurches along, progressing from milquetoast to restless rebel to boy of courage and conviction in fits and starts, driven by plot needs rather than organic character growth... despite its flaws, this offering is nevertheless a solid adventure and could serve as the jumping-off point for an exploration into a time of great political upheaval." Anita L. Burkam wrote in The Horn Book Magazine, "Avi writes a fast-paced, action-packed adventure comfortably submerged in its fourteenth-century setting, giving Crispin a realistic medieval worldview even while subverting it with Bear's revolutionary arguments."

Awards
Preceded by A Single Shard	Newbery Medal recipient 2003	Succeeded by The Tale of Despereaux
