= The Fighting Ground =

1984 children's novel by Avi

- Author: Avi
- Genre: Children's historical fiction
- Publication date: 1984
- Publication place: United States
- Media type: Print
- ISBN: 0-06-440185-5

The Fighting Ground is a 1984 historical young-adult novel written by Edward Irving Wortis, under his pen name, Avi. The book is about the disillusioning experience of a young teenager who runs away to fight in the American Revolutionary War. The novel covers two days, 3 to 4 April 1778.

== Plot summary ==
A 13-year-old New Jersey boy named Jonathan is impatient to join the Revolutionary War. His father used to help him train, but now after returning from a battle with a wound in his leg, Jonathan's father is fearful and does not want Jonathan to leave. However, when the war bell rings on 3 April 1778, Jonathan leaves anyway. He borrows a tavern owner's gun and joins a morning-long march to battle the German Hessians, who are allied with the British. Jonathan ends up being taken prisoner. Three Hessians take him to an old house where they bury a murdered couple, and Jonathan finds a small boy, a son of the buried couple, in the barn. He develops some degree of Stockholm Syndrome, before escaping in the night back to the American army camp. The Corporal, who turns out to be the one who murdered the boy's parents, knows where the house is. As the Corporal leads the American military to the house, they force Jonathan to see if the Hessians are awake or asleep. Out of compassion, Jonathan slips away and tries to help the Hessians escape, but he fails, and the Hessians lose their lives.

== Reception ==
The Fighting Ground received the following accolades:

- Scott O'Dell Award for Historical Fiction (1985)
- Dorothy Canfield Fisher Children's Book Award Nominee (1986)
- California Young Readers Medal Nominee for Middle School/Junior High (1988)
- American Library Association (ALA) Notable Children's Book
- Notable Children's Trade Book in the Field of Social Studies (NCSS/CBC)
- Library of Congress Children's Books

The book was banned from elementary schools in Florida's Bay District Schools in 2008 for containing profanity. The novel appears on the ALA list of the 100 Most Frequently Challenged Books of 2000–2009 at number 42.
