= The Good Dog =

Book by Avi

- First edition
- Author: Avi (pseudonym)
- Language: English
- Genre: Children's novel
- Publisher: Atheneum Books
- Publication date: 2001
- Publication place: USA
- Media type: Print
- Pages: 243
- ISBN: 978-0-689-83824-8
- OCLC: 45505842
- LC Class: PZ10.3.A965 Go 2001

The Good Dog is a children's novel by Newbery Medalist Edward Irving Wortis published under his pseudonym, Avi, in 2001. Written for ages 8–12, the book has been described as having "a very cinematic feel" comparable to the movies The Incredible Journey and Beethoven.

== Plot summary ==
The story is set in the town of Steamboat Springs, Colorado. It is recounted from the dog's point of view, with animals communicating with each other in English. The protagonist is a Malamute named McKinley, who protects his "human pup," Jack.

While helping a runaway greyhound named Duchess, McKinley meets the wolf, Lupin, who is trying to recruit dogs into her shrinking pack. McKinley must deal with Jack's desire to join the wolf pack, protect Lupin from hunters (including Duchess' ruthless owner, Pycraft), and figure out how to handle the local rival Redburn, an ambitious Irish Setter who wants to claim the role of head dog from McKinley.

By the end of the book, after overcoming many obstacles, some with the help of his best friend Aspen, a female Retriever (breed not specifically named in book) that lives next door, McKinley is transformed from a happy-go-lucky pet into a true leader.

== Literary significance and reception ==
Horn Book Magazine said in its review in 2002 that "the strongest parts of the book depict the communication gap between animal and human and that the novel falls somewhere between a naturalistic account of animal life and a fantasy." Publishers Weekly said that this novel had themes reminiscent to Jack London's Call of the Wild. And that "the dog's-eye point of view allows for some creative touches, including insights into animal behavior, but most compelling of all is the transformation of McKinley's happy-go-lucky character into a truly majestic leader."

== Awards ==
- The California Young Reader Medal, 2006
- Children's Crown Award, 2004
- Rocky Mountain News, one of the best books of the year, 2001
- Children's Choice nominee, Pennsylvania, 2003
- Children's Choice nominee, Minnesota, 2006
