= Crispin: At the Edge of the World =

2006 children's novel by Avi

- First edition cover
- Author: Avi (or Edward Irving Wortis)
- Language: English
- Series: Avi's Crispin
- Genre: Children's, Historical fiction novel
- Publisher: Hyperion Books for Children
- Publication date: September 2006
- Publication place: England
- Media type: Print (hardback & paperback)
- Pages: 234 pgs.
- ISBN: 0-7868-5152-X (first edition, hardback)
- OCLC: 65400628
- LC Class: PZ7.A953 Cp 2006
- Preceded by: Crispin: The Cross of Lead
- Followed by: Crispin: The End of Time

Crispin: At the Edge of the World is a novel by Edward Irving Wortis (under the pen name Avi), published in 2006. It serves as a sequel to his 2003 Newbery Medal award-winner Crispin: The Cross of Lead and is the second book in the Crispin trilogy. Crispin: At The Edge of the World was an ALA notable in 2007.

== Plot summary ==
At the conclusion of the Newbery Award–winning Crispin: The Cross of Lead, Bear and Crispin are free to follow new lives. As they travel in search of a new home, Bear is attacked by his old comrades in the Peasant's Revolt and wounded by an arrow. They escape to a woods where they are discovered by an old midwife-healer and a girl named Troth, who nurses Bear back to health. When the old woman is killed, Bear becomes the guardian of both children.

Fearing Bear's pursuers will never give up, they board a ship bound for Flanders. A storm lands them in France instead, where they are captured by English soldiers intent on breaking into a French village church to loot it. The soldiers threaten harm to Bear unless the children do their bidding. A bloody battle ensues, during which Crispin kills a man. The children escape the church and the soldiers with the mortally wounded Bear, who later dies of age and his wounds.

== Characters ==
- Crispin – The title character. He is a 13-year-old peasant boy, living in rural England in the year 1377.
- Bear (Orson Hrothgar) – A traveling jester and entertainer who takes Crispin and eventually Troth under his wing. He is also Crispin's teacher.
- Troth – A girl with a cleft lip who lives with Aude. She joins with Bear and Crispin in their journey. The word troth means to pledge to be faithful.
- Aude – A healer and midwife living in the woods with a girl named Troth.
