= Crispin: The End of Time =

2010 novel by Edward Irvin Wortis

- First edition cover
- Author: Avi (or Edward Irving Wortis)
- Language: English
- Series: Avi's Crispin
- Genre: Children's, Historical novel
- Publisher: Balzer + Bray
- Publication date: September 2010
- Publication place: England
- Media type: Print (hardback & paperback)
- Pages: 240pp
- ISBN: 0061740802
- Preceded by: Crispin: At the Edge of the World

Crispin: The End of Time is a novel released in 2010 by Edward Irving Wortis, serving as a sequel to his 2006 novel Crispin: At the Edge of the World. It is the third book in the Crispin trilogy.

== Plot summary ==
Devastated by Bear's death, Crispin and Troth are wandering through France with the dream of going to Iceland. Near starvation, they find bread and shelter in a convent where sick nuns draw Troth's attention. Troth is able to cure them and decides to remain as their healer.

Now on his own, Crispin encounters five travelers deep in the woods. They are a family of five minstrels heading to a wedding in Calais. They invite Crispin to join them. Crispin soon realizes they are thieves who plan to loot the wedding. The book tells how Crispin escapes from these thieves.

== Characters ==
- Owen – A boy taken as a slave by the thieves. He has a monkey named Schim. Crispin promises to take this boy with him to Iceland and helps him escape the thieves.
- Crispin – The title character. He is a 13-year-old peasant boy, living in rural England in the year 1377. He is a brave and courageous boy.
- Troth – A girl with a cleft lip who travels with Crispin. The word troth means to pledge to be faithful.
- Elana – The mother of four thieves, and their leader.
