= Something Upstairs =

1988 young adult historical thriller fiction novel by Avi

- First edition
- Author: Avi
- Language: English
- Genre: Young adult horror, mystery
- Publisher: Orchard Books/Scholastic
- Publication date: September 1, 1988
- Media type: Print
- Pages: 120 pp
- ISBN: 978-0-531-08382-6
- OCLC: 17803639
- LC Class: PZ7.A953 Sm 1988

Something Upstairs (also published as Something Upstairs: A Tale of Ghosts) is a 1988 young adult historical thriller fiction novel written by Avi. It concerns a 12-year-old boy named Kenny Huldorf who has moved to a new area and discovers a ghost, Caleb, in a room. Caleb was the slave of a previous owner of the home, and is stuck there until someone can help set him free. Kenny travels back in time with Caleb to find his murderer and comes to a dilemma on whether he can return to the present or save his new friend. The novel has won several awards in children's writing.

== Plot summary ==
Something Upstairs is about a twelve-year-old boy, Kenny Huldorf, who tells a story to Avi who had visited the school on a book tour. He moves from Los Angeles to Providence, Rhode Island. He lives in a house of past events, built in 1789. Kenny's room is in the attic. One night Kenny wakes to a scraping noise in the old slave room. When he looks inside, he sees a ghost that tries to get out from a stain on the floor. It moves a box full of books out of the way. Once it is out, the ghost feels the attic walls, in search of something. Kenny and the ghost see each other; the ghost does not speak, and flinches away and disappears when Kenny raises a shoe in defense.

Kenny tells his father there is something upstairs, but his father interprets that as a metaphor for “something you don’t want anyone to know about. Secrets.” Kenny visits the local library, where he meets an old historian, Pardon Willinghast, who is also curious about the property. Kenny tries to talk with the ghost boy, who mutters the word “slave.” He asks Willinghast if any former owners had slaves, but he doesn't get a candid answer. After getting a sample of the floor analyzed by a chemist, Kenny talks with the slave boy, whose name is Caleb, who affirms that's his blood, and that he was murdered in his sleep. He wants Kenny to help him find who did it. Kenny doesn't think that's possible, but as he leaves, he finds his room changed.

Kenny finds himself in an earlier time period. He follows a man who was staring at his window. Another man sees Kenny and asks him to pass a message, which he does, but he also reads it, noting it concerns a meeting aboard The Gaspee. Kenny runs back to his house and returns to his own time.

Kenny asks Caleb why he can't leave. Caleb says his death was unnatural, so he's a memory fixed in time and space. Caleb affirms the men were slave traders, and gives Kenny the approximate day he was killed. Kenny confirms in the news articles that Caleb was found dead in the locked attic room in an apparent suicide.

Caleb denies the suicide, but Kenny agrees to help him. They go back in time and listen in on the conversation aboard The Gaspee, which also includes Pardon Willinghast! The men talk about how they can preserve their slave trade, by motivating the slave trade workers outside to go to Olney Lane to silence the blacks who live there. Caleb disappears. Kenny tries to leave but is stopped by Willinghast, who tells Kenny that he is a memory as well, and that Caleb's running and the men leaving are all going according to plan. He takes Kenny's keychain and states that Kenny could be stuck in this time period forever as a ghost because of altered events.

Kenny goes to Olney Lane and finds Caleb who has a musket. Then the angry drunken mob approaches, but Caleb confronts them, and gets hit in the face with a rock before Kenny pulls him back. The mob sets fire to one of the nearby houses. Caleb is so furious that he shoots and kills one of the mob. The mob tries to go after Caleb and Kenny, but they escape in the rain.

Kenny and Caleb retreat to their house. After figuring a way to lock the room from the inside, Kenny goes out to seek help, but is stopped by Pardon Willinghast, who has a proposal for Kenny. In order to return to the present time, Kenny will have to kill Caleb in the room, and then lock it from the inside to fulfill the suicide scenario. Willinghast also reveals that he originally killed Caleb, and that others were given a similar situation and had killed Caleb. He gives Kenny a double-barreled pistol.

Kenny returns to Caleb and says that he was the murderer, but it was Willinghast who blackmailed him. The boys think of a way to change the situation. They fake Caleb's death using the blood from his cheek, and lure Willinghast into the room. Willinghast arrives and checks Caleb's body but finds he is still alive. He orders Kenny to shoot Caleb and dangles the keychain. Kenny shoots.

Kenny wakes up in the present time and sees there is no stain on the floor. The library article now reads that Willinghast committed suicide and the slave boy is missing. Kenny wonders if Caleb is truly free or whether he is stuck in another house as a memory.

== Characters ==
Kenny Huldorf
Kenny is a 12-year-old boy who moves from Los Angeles to Providence, Rhode Island, where, in his room, he is haunted by a ghost, who turns to be Caleb. He is small in stature, has light hair and freckles. He carries around a Los Angeles Dodgers keychain. He agrees to help Caleb find the murderer, and goes back in time. He learns that the slave traders want to send a message against the abolitionists, setting up the reason why Caleb was killed. But then Willinghast grabs Kenny's key chain and blackmails him into choosing whether to kill Caleb and return to his own time, or to save him and risk being a ghost forever in the past.

Caleb
Caleb is a slave boy estimated to be 16 years old in 1800, but is a ghost in the present time whose memories are strongly tied to the house. He was apparently killed in a room in the attic, after being asked to stay at the house while his masters, the Stilwells, were out. He is seen by Kenny crawling out of a blood stain and searching the walls for a way out. Caleb wants Kenny to find his murderer. He has a scar on his cheek and a blood stain on his back. Caleb initially doesn't trust Kenny, but decides to follow him after Kenny agrees to help out. When he and Kenny go back in time, Caleb loses his blood stain and appears to be alive.

Pardon Willinghast
Willinghast is a historian that Kenny encountered at the library, but in 1800, he was one of the slave traders who conspired to make a statement against the abolitionists. He knows about Kenny's investigation, and while he was originally helpful, he eventually reveals to Kenny that he is also a strong memory that wants the events to take place so that Caleb dies. He later reveals he plotted the murder of Caleb.

Moses Brown
An abolitionist in the 18th century. At one point in the story, he marks a wall and states that as long as the mark stays there, he will not allow slavery.

Esek Ormsbee
One of the slave traders. He asks Kenny to give a message to Mr. Seagrave concerning a meeting.

Philip Seagrave
One of the slave traders who meets with Ormsbee and Willinghast. His house has the mark that Mr. Brown placed.

Avi
The author introduces the story of Caleb and Kenny as coming from a visit by Kenny who wanted to share his story.

== Conception ==
Avi writes that Something Upstairs “was the first of my three Providence (Rhode Island) tales,” and that he had also moved from Los Angeles to Providence, and even lived on 30 Sheldon Street, which was built in the 1830s. When asked if the story is real, Avi responded that “it’s true if you believe in time travel and ghosts. As for me, I don’t believe in ghosts, but I do believe in ghost stories.”

== Publication ==
Something Upstairs: A Tale of Ghosts was originally published by Orchard Books on September 1, 1988 in hardcover format. The title was simplified to Something Upstairs starting with the 1990 paperback edition. Orchard Books was acquired by Scholastic, who printed their paperback edition in 2010. A list of notable formats is as follows:

Release date	Publisher	Format	Pages	ISBN
September 1988	Orchard Books	hardcover	120pp	978-0531057827
October 1990	HarperCollins	mass-market paperback	128pp	978-0380708536
1992	Recorded Books	audio cassette	3 tapes	978-1556906138
July 2010	Scholastic Press	mass-market paperback	140pp	978-0545214919

== Legacy ==
The Rhode Island Historical Society hosts the Avi Tour, which walks through some of the places and the waterfront districts in Providence mentioned in the book.

== Awards ==
- Best Books of the Year, Library of Congress, 1989
- Nominated, Best Juvenile Mystery of the Year, Mystery Writers of America, 1989
- Rhode Island Children's Book Award, 1991
- Florida Sunshine State Young Readers Award, 1992
- ALA Notable Recording, 1992 (Recorded Books, Inc.)
- California Young Reader Medal, Middle School/Junior High, 1993
- YALSA Popular Paperbacks for Young Adults, 1999
