= Nothing but the Truth: A Documentary Novel =

1991 novel by Avi

- First hardcover edition
- Author: Avi
- Working title: Discovery
- Language: English
- Genre: Realistic fiction
- Publisher: Orchard Books
- Publication date: 1991
- Publication place: United States
- Media type: Print (hardcover and paperback)
- Pages: 177 pages
- ISBN: 0-531-05959-6
- OCLC: 23252515

Nothing but the Truth: A Documentary Novel is a 1991 novel written by Avi. The novel tells the story of an incident in a fictional New Hampshire town where a boy is suspended for humming the United States national anthem, as well as the effects of the story receiving national publicity.

The novel utilizes an epistolary format, consisting of a series of documents, such as transcripts, letters, memos, journal entries, and news articles, presented in chronological order. The novel aims to demonstrate the subjectivity of truth, as well as the ways that facts can become distorted as they spread.

Nothing but the Truth won a 1992 Newbery Honor. In 1997, the novel was adapted into a play by Ronn Smith.

== Plot ==
Philip Malloy is a track-obsessed ninth grader at Harrison High School in New Hampshire. After receiving a D in his English class, which disqualifies him from trying out for the track team, Philip grows resentful of his English teacher, Miss Narwin. When Philip is moved into Miss Narwin's homeroom period, he starts humming The Star-Spangled Banner during morning exercises, in violation of the exercises' instruction to "stand at respectful, silent attention". After three days of this behavior, which Miss Narwin views as disruptive, Philip is sent to the vice principal, who offers him a chance to apologize to Miss Narwin. Phillip refuses, and per district procedure for repeated disruptive behavior, he is suspended for two days.

Philip tells his parents that he was suspended for singing the national anthem. Philip's father shares the news with their neighbor, Ted Griffen, who is running for the school board. Griffen arranges an interview between Philip and a local journalist, who publishes a newspaper article depicting the school's actions in an unpatriotic light. The article garners national attention when it is picked up by the American Affiliated Press (a stand-in for the Associated Press) as well as a nationally syndicated radio program, leading hundreds to send letters and telegrams to Philip lauding his patriotism and to Miss Narwin and the school condemning her alleged attempts to stymie it.

Upon returning to Harrison High, Phillip finds that his peers, including his crush, and some of the faculty resent him for his role in the media firestorm surrounding Miss Narwin, who was popular among the student body. Additionally, he is transferred out of Miss Narwin's English class, making him unable to receive the makeup work needed to improve his grade and join the track team. After a friend jokingly tells him that his classmates are planning to circulate a petition demanding he apologize, Philip runs home and refuses to return to school.

Meanwhile, Harrison School District faces a school board election and a referendum on a budget extension, which would have dire consequences for the school if it fails. To prevent the scandal from weakening support for the extension, the school places Miss Narwin on administrative leave, and she resigns soon after. The effort proves futile, as the budget extension is rejected by a substantial margin. Ted Griffen, who ran on an anti-tax campaign, is elected to the school board on the back of his advocacy for Philip. A reporter from the St. Louis Post-Dispatch attempts to cover Miss Narwin's side of the story, but the article is buried during an international crisis.

Philip's mother ultimately transfers him to a private school, Washington Academy, despite protests from his father, as the tuition would use up all of Philip's college funds and much of his parents' savings. On his first day at Washington Academy, Philip is dismayed to learn that the school does not have a track team. Later, when asked to lead his classmates in singing the national anthem, he breaks down crying and admits that he does not know the words.

== Background ==
In a 2017 retrospective on the novel, Avi described it as being inspired by living newspaper plays and boxed mystery games. The story's working title was Discovery, taken from the term for evidence-gathering in a court case. The plot's inciting incident was inspired by a newspaper story about a boy refusing to sing The Star-Spangled Banner.
