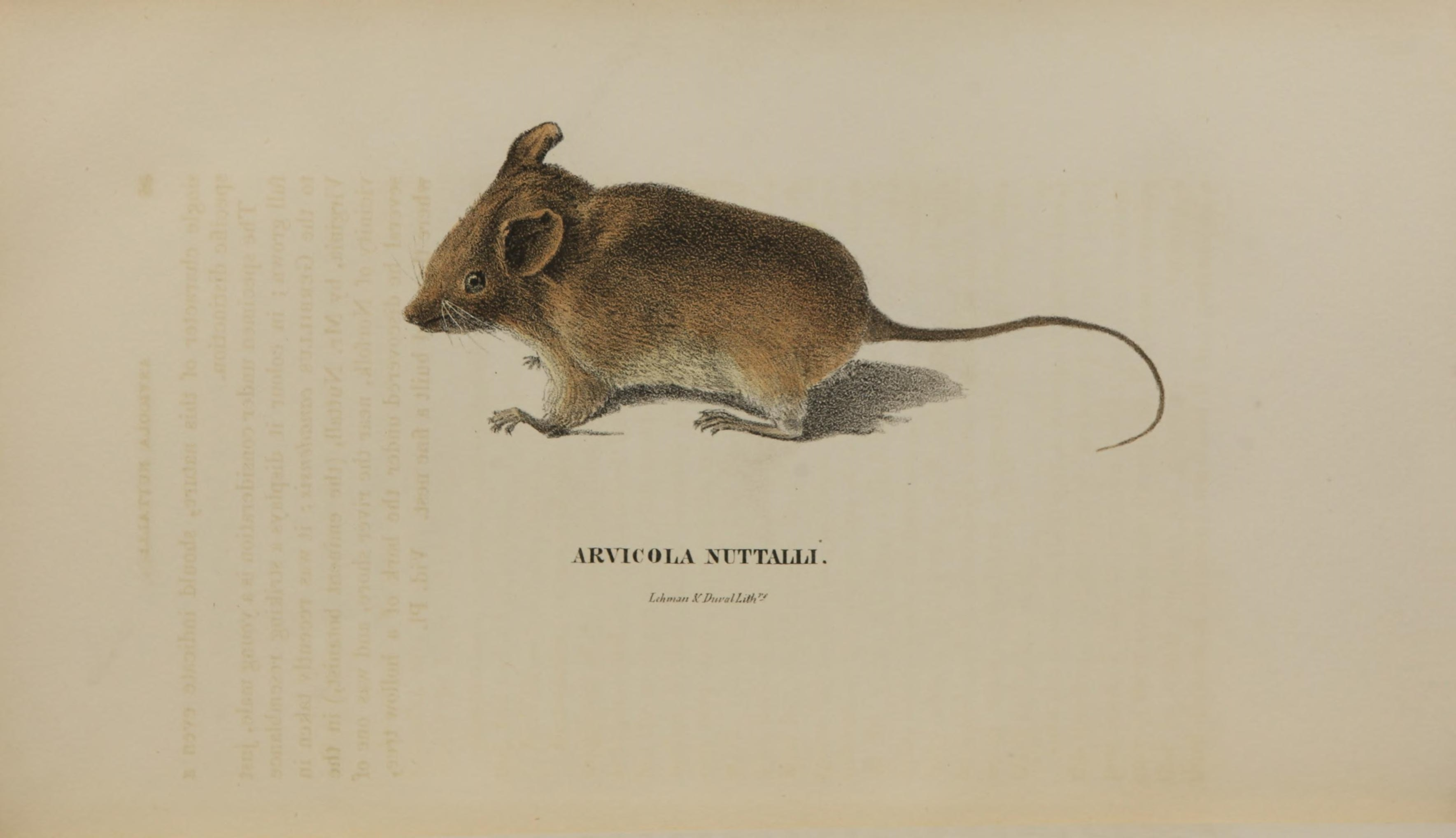

Conservation status
- Least Concern (IUCN 3.1)

Scientific classification
- Kingdom: Animalia
- Phylum: Chordata
- Class: Mammalia
- Order: Rodentia
- Family: Cricetidae
- Subfamily: Neotominae
- Tribe: Ochrotomyini; Musser and Carleton, 2005
- Genus: Ochrotomys; Osgood, 1909
- Species: O. nuttalli

Binomial name
- Ochrotomys nuttalli (Harlan, 1832)

= Golden mouse =

Golden mouse Temporal range: Late Pleistocene to Recent

Species of rodent

The golden mouse (Ochrotomys nuttalli) is a species of New World mouse. It is usually 5–8 inches (12–25 cm) in body length, and has a soft pelage that ranges from golden-brownish to burnt orange in color. The genus name comes from the Greek words, ochra, meaning "ocher", a yellow or brown earth pigment; oto- (from ous), meaning "ear"; and mys, meaning "mouse".

== Geographic range ==
The golden mouse lives and breeds in the southeastern United States, including southeastern Missouri to West Virginia and southern Virginia, south to eastern Texas, the Gulf Coast, and central Florida. The golden mouse is currently regarded as a species with a secure population that is not severely fragmented throughout its range.

== Habitat ==
Golden mice live in thick woodlands, swampy areas, among vines, and within small trees and shrubs. These animals especially like to live where honeysuckle, greenbrier, and red cedar grow. Golden mice in the south-central region of the United States inhabit climates that are hot and wet in the summer and dry in the winter.

Their nests may be located in the trees or on the ground. Ground nests, frequently located near leaf litter, may be fabricated within sunken areas of the soil or beneath logs. Ground nests have both advantages and disadvantages. Floods or wet soil may force golden mice to leave their ground nests and relocate into the trees. However, if the ground nest is undisturbed, it can lower the risk for predation for the following reasons: the nest is well hidden, a mouse on the ground is more likely to escape a predator, and less energy is required to build a nest on the ground since the mouse does not have to keep running up and down a tree with nesting materials.

Golden mice have been known to remodel old bird nests into homes for themselves. Otherwise, these animals create a nest 100 to 200 mm in size from scratch using different elements, depending on what materials are locally available.

The inner lining of a nest consists of soft materials such as milkweed, cotton, feathers, or fur. A thick layer of woven fibers surrounds this fluffy layer. The protective surface material contains leaves, grass, and bark. The nest usually has one entrance, although up to 57 have been noted.

== Physical description ==
The body length of the golden mouse ranges from 50 to 115 mm. The prehensile tail is from 50 to 97 mm in length, generally the same length as the mouse's body. Male golden mice have a baculum tipped with cartilage. Females have six mammae. The whiskers on the face are either black or grey. Golden mice receive their common name from the thick and soft golden fur that covers the upper body. However, the feet and undersides are white and its tail has a cream coloring. The cheek teeth of golden mice contain thick folds of enamel. As in other species of Muroidea, golden mice have an infraorbital foramen with a distinct keyhole shape. Neither canines nor premolars are present. Incisors are sharp and long, separated from the cheek teeth by a diastema.

Regional differences occur in the amount of yellowish, reddish and brownish overtones in the dorsal pelage. About five subspecies have been described; however, all are likely representative of a regional cline rather than distinct populations. Populations from the Atlantic coastal plains of Virginia, the Carolinas and Georgia (O. n. nuttalli) are somewhat brighter (more reddish-yellow); populations from the Piedmont and mountainous areas to the west (O. n. aureolis) are somewhat more brownish; populations from Texas, northern Louisiana, Arkansas, Missouri and Illinois (O. n. lisae and O. n. flammeus) have more yellowish overtones; populations from the Florida peninsula (O. n. floridanus) are a rich yellowish-brown.

Because of their attractive color, golden mice have often been used in books, such as Poppy.

== Diet ==
Golden mice are granivorous and eat mostly seeds. They forage among trees for buds, berries, seeds, fruits, leaves, and some insects. They prefer sumac seeds and honeysuckle. They also consume berries from plants like dogwood, greenbrier, blackberry and wild cherry.

== Reproduction ==
Golden mice reproduce all year long; however, the reproductive season varies geographically. The majority of golden mice reproduce from September to spring in Texas, but from March to October in Kentucky and Tennessee. The breeding period in Missouri also lasts from spring to fall and extends from April until October. Golden mice in captivity tend to reproduce most frequently during the early spring and late summer. Because the gestation period is only about 25 to 30 days, females can produce many litters in one year. Litters tend to be larger in the fall than the spring. Captive mothers have been known to produce up to 17 litters in an 18-month period. A litter of golden mice typically consists of two or three young, but can range from one to four. Aside from the mother, all other adults leave the nest when the litter is born. Newborn golden mice have a rapid growth and development rate and are able to achieve independence by three weeks of age, with sexual maturity following within a few weeks.

== Behavior ==
The golden mouse is mainly crepuscular and arboreal, although many live on the ground as well. Its peak activity occurs around 3 to 4 hours before dawn. Golden mice move quickly and easily and are able to use their prehensile tails for balance while climbing trees, to hang from branches, and to anchor themselves to a tree limb while they sleep.

Newborn golden mice are fairly coordinated at birth; however, they have a tendency to remain quietly in one spot. At 1 day, they are able to take their first steps and right themselves up easily. Their prehensile tail tendencies become evident at 2 days and at 4 days they exhibit a sense of balance and are able to balance themselves and hang upside down. At 10 days, young golden mice display a tendency to crawl upward and at 15 days, they are able to jump. Days 17 and 18 are when young mice are seen to become even more active, yet they remain docile when held in a hand. The first attempts at bathing have been observed at 7 days and at 12 days, young golden mice attempt to wash behind their ears, but they are still relatively unsteady. Between 12 and 21 days, newborn golden mice bathe frequently and thoroughly. At 21 days, a considerable amount of time was spent outside the nest. Upon birth, if handled every few days once their eyes opened, the young golden mice become more docile and are easily managed through their adult life. If young golden mice are not handled frequently during this period, they are more likely to be wild and difficult to manage.

The golden mouse is a gregarious creature and not particularly territorial. As a result, the home ranges of many individuals may overlap. In fact, up to eight golden mice have been discovered sharing a nest at one time. Groups can consist of kin or unrelated individuals. The most common groups consist of mothers and their young. Many scientists speculate that living in groups conserves energy. This idea is supported by the observation that golden mice are found in groups more often in the winter, when such grouping produces a clear cut thermoregulatory benefit. Golden mice have a low basal metabolic rate and high conductance. When their areas become flooded, golden mice activity is significantly reduced. Golden mice typically build two different types of nests: one for eating and one for resting and living.

Golden mice in captivity have displayed submissive behavior.
