= The True Confessions of Charlotte Doyle =

1990 historical novel by Avi

- Cover for the novel
- Author: Avi
- Cover artist: Ruth E. Murray 1st edition
- Language: English
- Genre: Historical fiction
- Publisher: Orchard Books
- Publication date: 1990
- Publication place: United States
- Media type: Novel
- Pages: 226
- ISBN: 0-531-05893-X
- OCLC: 21149467

The True Confessions of Charlotte Doyle is a historical fiction novel by the American author Avi, published in 1990. The book is marketed towards children at a reading level of grades 5–8. The book chronicles the evolution of the title character as she is pushed outside her naïve existence and learns about life aboard a ship crossing from England to America in 1832. The novel was well received and won several awards, including being named as a Newbery Honor book in 1991.

== Plot ==
The story starts in the early summer of 1832, as thirteen-year-old Charlotte Doyle prepares to take a voyage from Liverpool, England, to her family's home in Providence, Rhode Island. Her upper-class upbringing and her education give her a very sheltered and narrow view of life. Charlotte finds herself the only passenger and the only female on the ship, the Seahawk. Repeatedly, people tell her she should not be on the ship, but her escort, Mr. Grummage, insists Charlotte go.

On her first day aboard, a black sailor named Zachariah gives her a dirk for protection. He also warns Charlotte about Jaggery, the captain of the ship, which Charlotte does not believe. The captain and Charlotte become very close and he says that if she ever sees anything suspicious, she must tell him.

After spotting a round robin, a sign of mutiny, Charlotte warns Jaggery, who heads off the rebellion and kills its ringleader Cranick. Charlotte is distressed when Captain Jaggery and first mate Mr. Hollybrass whip Zachariah for 50 lashes. Charlotte tries to protect Zachariah by grabbing the whip, but accidentally hits the captain's face. Jaggery is enraged and whips Zachariah mercilessly, leading to his apparent death and funeral.

After the captain has withdrawn his protection of Charlotte, she feels compelled to replace Zachariah as a crew member out of guilt. The crew allows her to join them after she successfully climbs up and down the tallest mast. Upon learning of Charlotte's plans, Captain Jaggery strikes Charlotte across the face, and she vows to reveal his cruelty to the courts after they complete their voyage.

As the Seahawk enters a powerful hurricane, Charlotte falls from the ratlines and is saved by a man whom she believes is Zachariah, despite his apparent death. After the storm, the crew finds First Mate Hollybrass, stabbed in the back by the dirk Zachariah gave Charlotte. She is ordered to the brig, where she finds Zachariah, who has been hiding there since he was thrashed nearly to death. Captain Jaggery holds a trial and finds her guilty of Mr. Hollybrass's murder. As Charlotte has vowed to expose his cruelty when they land, he threatens to hang her unless she will align herself with him and become a respectable young woman again.

With Zachariah's help, Charlotte escapes the prison and plans to steal the captain's guns and usurp his title. Upon her finding Jaggery, he reveals that he killed Hollybrass. He presents her with three choices (be disgraced by killing him, return to her proper place as a woman, or accept her fate), all of which she refuses, and flees Jaggery. The Captain attempts to kill her in front of the crew, but falls off the ship where he is crushed to death. Zachariah leads the crew in naming Charlotte as captain, but she serves primarily as a figurehead for Zachariah due to her lack of experience. They land in Providence twelve hours later.

When the Seahawk arrives in Rhode Island, Charlotte returns to her old "proper" behavior and dress. She intends to hide what happened from her family, but her father reads her journal of the voyage. He is appalled, burns the diary, and grounds Charlotte for a week. Charlotte finally decides to escape from her home one night, and returns to the Seahawk to be a sailor with Zachariah and the crew.

== Themes ==
Class and gender play a substantial role in the novel and help to frame it as a quest story. At the start of the novel Charlotte is an upper-class teenage girl who becomes a member of the Seahawk crew thus complicating her gender and class identities. Charlotte remains a girl, but presents an attractive alternative for the reader to the gender norms typically associated with that identity. Owing to her experiences, first cooperating with, and then rebelling against Jaggery, Charlotte has changed by the end of the novel into an authentic version of herself, not merely reflecting what society expected of her.

Avi felt the ending where Charlotte rejects her family was a choice for freedom and an essential element of the overall story. He also identified Jaggery as a protagonist in the story and felt the book served as an implicit criticism of capitalism. However, by the end of the novel the only non-working class person alive, Charlotte, also becomes the Captain thus suggesting a preservation of the class system even while gender roles have been challenged. Indeed Charlotte's inability to see things as they are rather than through her class-conscious viewpoint creates much of the conflict in the book.

The book also features a narrator, Charlotte, who knows she is telling a story. This element of metafiction is important to the novel. Charlotte's narrative style is similar to 19th-century travelogues. The book opens with "an important warning" and the narrator, Charlotte, defending the right to tell her story because it "is worth relating even if it did happen years ago". Even while Charlotte undergoes changes as a character, her narrative voice remains constant. Charlotte can, however, act as an unreliable narrator to the outside world as when she records in the log that Jaggery fell to his death, so he is remembered positively rather than as a murderer to the outside world.

== Reception ==
The True Confessions of Charlotte Doyle received a positive critical reaction when it was published. In its starred review of the book, Kirkus Reviews called it "tautly plotted, vividly narrated, carefully researched: a thrilling tale deepened by its sober look at attitudes that may have been more exaggerated in the past but that still persist". Cathryn Mercier in Five Owls review journal noted the "innovative mixture of history and fiction" and said the book was "expertly crafted and consistently involving, it is sure to excite, enthrall, and challenge readers." Horn Book, giving it its highest rating of outstanding, said the book was "a rousing adventure story".

Barbara Elleman writing for Booklist contended it was not just an adventure story, saying the dynamic between Charlotte and Zachariah "allows the story to rise above swashbuckling adventure, though that element is there too. From its riveting opening line...to its surprise ending, this is a story harder to forget." Judy Eftekhar praised the book for Charlotte's ability to grow as a person while remaining true to her character. However, the author has also been criticized for giving Charlotte too modern a sensibility, effectively making her a "time-traveler" in her own culture. According to Anne Scott MacLeod, authors who "evade the common realities of the societies they write about" and "give their heroines freer choices than their cultures would in fact have offered", are misrepresenting history.

The True Confessions of Charlotte Doyle has been repeatedly listed as a core collection book for libraries, for middle school and junior high readers. Matt Berman, of Common Sense Media, rated this book a 5 out of 5 stars for ages 9 and up. The Christian Science Monitor has rated The True Confessions of Charlotte Doyle number 1 of their "12 Best Books for Preteens".

=== Awards ===
The True Confessions of Charlotte Doyle was a Newbery Honor Book in 1991. A member of the Newbery committee that year felt the book deserved to win the Newbery Medal and described the book as being about "a spunky young lady [who] goes from polite idealist impressed by good manners and gallantry to a realistic young woman who comes to terms with the complexity of the 19th-century society in which she lives". It won several other critical awards including the Golden Kite Award, the Boston Globe–Horn Book Award, and the Judy Lopez Award.

The book also appeared on several notable or best-of book lists, including the ALA's Notable Children's Book, ALA's Best Book for Young Adults, and School Library Journal's Books That Shaped a Century. The book was not only popular with adult critics, but also children, winning several children's choice awards including the Evergreen Award, Massachusetts Children's Book Award, the Sunshine State Young Readers Award, and the Beehive Award.

== Film ==
A film adaptation of the book was in development. It was written and would have been directed by Danny DeVito, starring Morgan Freeman as Zachariah and Pierce Brosnan as Jaggery. Dakota Fanning was originally cast as Charlotte Doyle, but had to drop out as production was continually halted and she eventually grew too old for the part. Saoirse Ronan was later cast, but the film was again halted because Freeman was seriously injured in a car accident two weeks before filming was scheduled to commence. DeVito returned to the subject in February 2013, saying he was looking for another young actress to star in the title role and scouting movie locations in Ireland. Shooting was supposed to start in July 2014. The release date is still classified as "TBD" without any new information as to whether it will be shot.
