= Manfred Sakel =

Austrian-American neurophysiologist and psychiatrist (1900–1957)

- Born: June 6, 1900; Nadvirna
- Died: December 2, 1957 (aged 57); New York City
- Education: University of Vienna
- Known for: insulin shock therapy

Manfred Joshua Sakel (June 6, 1900 – December 2, 1957) was an Austrian-American neurophysiologist and psychiatrist, credited with developing insulin shock therapy in 1927.

== Biography ==
Sakel was born to a Jewish family on June 6, 1900, in Nadvirna (Nadwórna), in the former Austria-Hungary Empire (now Ukraine), which was part of Poland between the world wars. Sakel studied Medicine at the University of Vienna from 1919 to 1925, specializing in neurology and neuropsychiatry. From 1927 until 1933 Sakel worked in hospitals in Berlin. In 1933 he became a researcher for the University of Vienna's Neuropsychiatric Clinic. In 1936, after receiving an invitation from Frederick Parsons, a commissioner of mental hygiene, he chose to emigrate from Austria to the United States of America. In the USA, he became an attending physician and researcher at the Harlem Valley State Hospital.

Dr. Sakel was the developer of insulin shock therapy from 1927 while a young doctor in Vienna, starting to practice it in 1933. It would become used widely for individuals with schizophrenia and other mental patients. He noted that insulin-induced coma and convulsions, due to the low level of glucose attained in the blood (hypoglycemic crisis), had a short-term appearance of changing the mental state of drug addicts and psychotics, sometimes dramatically. He reported that as many as 88% of his patients improved with insulin shock therapy, but most other people reported more mixed results and it was shown eventually that patient selection had been biased and that it didn't really have any specific benefits and had many risks, adverse effects and fatalities. However, his method was used for many years in mental institutions worldwide. In the USA and other countries it was discontinued gradually after the introduction of the electroconvulsive therapy during the 1940s and the first neuroleptic drugs during the 1950s.

Dr. Sakel died from heart failure on December 2, 1957, in New York City, NY, USA.
