= Kelly Rimmer =

Australian author

Kelly Rimmer is an Australian author of romance fiction and historical fiction. She has stated that a historical fiction author needs research and daydreaming. She plots her books before she begins to write them.

Rimmer lives in New South Wales, Australia. She owns a bookshop, Collins Booksellers Orange, which she purchased in 2022.

== Reception ==
The Warsaw Orphan (2021) was a New York Times bestseller, as was the audiobook of The Things We Cannot Say (Harlequin Audio, 2020).

Several of Rimmer's books have been Apple Books bestsellers: A Mother's Confession (2017), Before I Let You Go (2018), The Things We Cannot Say (2019), and The German Wife (2022).

Truths I Never Told You (2020) and The Warsaw Orphan (2021) were Publishers Weekly bestsellers.

Truths I Never Told You (2020) received a starred review from Publishers Weekly; it said, "Rimmer’s suspenseful narrative will enthrall and move readers".

== Selected works ==
- Me without You. Bookouture, 2014.
- The Secret Daughter. Bookouture, 2015.
- When I Lost You. Ickenham, 2016.
- A Mother's Confession. Bookouture, 2016.
- Before I Let You Go. Graydon House, 2018.
- The Things We Cannot Say. Hachette Australia, 2019.
- Truths I Never Told You. Headline Review, 2020.
- The Warsaw Orphan. Graydon House, 2021.
- The German Wife. Graydon House, 2022.
- The Paris Agent. Harlequin, 2023.

=== Start up in the City series ===
- Unexpected. HQN Books, 2019.
- Unspoken. HQN Books, 2019.
- Undone. HQN Books, 2020.
