= Cybils Awards for Fiction =

Award for children's fiction

The Cybils Awards for Fiction are annual literary awards for children's fiction. The awards are presented across three categories: picture book, middle grade, and young adult. All three categories were established in 2006. The award was last presented in 2024, with the organization taking a hiatus in 2025.

== Recipients ==
=== Picture book ===
Year	Author(s)	Title	Result	Ref.
2006	Mélanie Watt	Scaredy Squirrel	Winner	
2006	Emily Gravett	Wolves	Finalists	
2006	Kimberly Willis Holt, illus. by Gabi Swiatkowska	Waiting for Gregory	Finalists	
2006	Sebastian Meschenmoser	Learning to Fly	Finalists	
2006	Komako Sakai	Emily's Balloon	Finalists	
2007	Janice N. Harrington, illus. by Shelley Jackson	The Chicken-Chasing Queen of Lamar County	Winner	
2007	Adam Rex	Pssst!	Finalists	
2007	Natasha Wing, illus. by Sylvie Kantorovitz	Go to Bed, Monster!	Finalists	
2007	David Ezra Stein	Leaves	Finalists	
2007	Karen Lynn Williams and Khadra Mohammad, illus. by Doug Chayka	Four Feet, Two Sandals	Finalists	
2007	Mo Willems	Knuffle Bunny Too	Finalists	
2007	Oliver Jeffers	The Incredible Book-Eating Boy	Finalists	
2008	Bob Graham	How to Heal a Broken Wing	Winner	
2008	Deborah Hopkinson, illus. by John Hendrix	Abe Lincoln Crosses Creek	Finalists	
2008	Franny Billingsley, illus. by G. Brian Karas	The Big Bad Bunny	Finalists	
2008	Mélanie Watt	Chester's Back	Finalists	
2008	John Himmelman	Katie Loves the Kittens	Finalists	
2008	Dashka Slater, illus. by Catia Chien	The Sea Serpent and Me	Finalists	
2008	Bonny Becker, illus. by Kady Denton	A Visitor for Bear	Finalists	
2008	Mark Reibstein, illus. by Ed Young	Wabi Sabi	Finalists	
2009	Liz Garton Scanlon, illus. by Marla Frazee	All the World	Winner	
2009	John Perry, illus. by Mark Fearing	The Book That Eats People	Finalist	
2009	Peter Brown	The Curious Garden	Finalist	
2009	Peter McCarty	Jeremy Draws a Monster	Finalist	
2009	Jerry Pinkney	The Lion & the Mouse	Finalist	
2009	Gloria Whelan, illus. by Mike Benny	The Listeners	Finalist	
2009	Eileen Spinelli, illus. by David Slonim	Silly Tilly	Finalist	
2010	David Ezra Stein	Interrupting Chicken	Winner	
2010	Karen Lynn Williams, illus. by Floyd Cooper	A Beach Tail	Finalist	
2010	Bill Thomson	Chalk	Finalist	
2010	Karma Wilson, illus. by Marcellus Hall	The Cow Loves Cookies	Finalist	
2010	Jeanne Birdsall, illus. by Matt Phelan	Flora's Very Windy Day	Finalist	
2010	Chris Barton, illus. by Tom Lichtenheld	Shark vs. Train	Finalist	
2010	Philip C. Stead, illus. by Erin E. Stead	A Sick Day for Amos McGee	Finalist	
2011	Patrick McDonnell	Me ... Jane	Winner	
2011	John Rocco	Blackout	Finalist	
2011	Susan A. Shea, illus. by Tom Slaughter	Do You Know Which Ones Will Grow?	Finalist	
2011	Boni Ashburn, illus. by Julia Denos	I Had a Favorite Dress	Finalist	
2011	Jon Klassen	I Want My Hat Back	Finalist	
2011	Hervé Tullet	Press Here	Finalist	
2011	Jonathan Emmett, illus. by Poly Bernatene	The Princess and the Pig	Finalist	
2012	Philip C. Stead	A Home for Bird	Winner	
2012	Levi Pinfold	Black Dog	Finalist	
2012	Mac Barnett, illus. by Adam Rex	Chloe and the Lion	Finalist	
2012	Aaron Reynolds, illus. by Peter Brown	Creepy Carrots!	Finalist	
2012	Mac Barnett, illus. by Jon Klassen	Extra Yarn	Finalist	
2012	Kate Hosford, illus. by Gabi Swiatkowska	Infinity and Me	Finalist	
2012	Lola M. Schaefer, illus. by Jessica Meserve	One Special Day	Finalist	
2013	Peter Brown	Mr. Tiger Goes Wild	Winner	
2013	Mac Barnett	Count the Monkeys	Finalist	
2013	Julie Fogliano, illus. by Erin E. Stead	If You Want to See a Whale	Finalist	
2013	Aaron Becker	Journey	Finalist	
2013	Jesse Klausmeier, illus. by Suzy Lee	Open This Little Book	Finalist	
2013	Pat Zietlow Miller, illus. by Anne Wilsdorf	Sophie's Squash	Finalist	
2013	Benjamin Chaud	The Bear's Song	Finalist	
2014	Chris Haughton	Shh! We Have a Plan	Winner	
2014	Andrew Prahin	Brimsby's Hats	Finalist	
2014	Deborah Underwood, illus. by Claudia Rueda	Here Comes the Easter Cat	Finalist	
2014	Daniel Beaty, illus. by Bryan Collier	Knock Knock: My Dad's Dream for Me	Finalist	
2014	Lori Nichols	Maple	Finalist	
2014	Mark Pett	The Girl and the Bicycle	Finalist	
2014	Richard T. Morris, illus. by Tom Lichtenheld	This Is a Moose	Finalist	
2015	JonArno Lawson, illus. by Sydney Smith	Sidewalk Flowers	Winner	
2015	John Rocco	Blizzard	Finalist	
2015	Mélanie Watt	Bug in a Vacuum	Finalist	
2015	Sean Taylor, illus. by Jean Jullien	Hoot Owl, Master of Disguise	Finalist	
2015	Mượn Thị Văn, illus. by April Chu	In a Village by the Sea	Finalist	
2015	Matt de la Peña, illustrated by Christian Robinson	Last Stop on Market Street	Finalist	
2015	Meg Medina, illus. by Angela Domingue	Mango, Abuela, and Me	Finalist	
2016	Lucy Ruth Cummins	A Hungry Lion, or A Dwindling Assortment of Animals	Winner	
2016	Caron Levis, illus. by Charles Santoso	Ida, Always	Finalist	
2016	Daniel Bernstrom, illus. by Brendan Wenzel	One Day in the Eucalyptus, Eucalyptus Tree	Finalist	
2016	Lisa Mantchev, illus. by Taeeun Yoo	Strictly No Elephants	Finalist	
2016	Terry Fan	The Night Gardener	Finalist	
2016	Ross Collins	There's a Bear on My Chair	Finalist	
2016	Brendan Wenzel	They All Saw a Cat	Finalist	
2017	Elisha Cooper	Big Cat, Little Cat	Winner	
2017	Dan Santat	After the Fall: How Humpty Dumpty Got Back Up Again	Finalist	
2017	David Elliott, illus. by Melissa Sweet	Baabwaa and Wooliam	Finalist	
2017	Aaron Reynolds, illus. by Peter Brown	Creepy Pair of Underwear!	Finalist	
2017	Dashka Slater, illus. by Sydney Hanson	Escargot	Finalist	
2017	John McCutcheon, illus. by Kristy Caldwell	Flowers for Sarajevo	Finalist	
2017	Corinna Luyken	The Book of Mistakes	Finalist	
2018	Ryan T. Higgins	We Don't Eat Our Classmates	Winner	
2018	Juana Martinez-Neal	Alma and How She Got Her Name	Finalist	
2018	Jessica Love	Julián Is a Mermaid	Finalist	
2018	Nicola Davies, illus. by Rebecca Cobb	The Day War Came	Finalist	
2018	Jacqueline Woodson, illus. by Rafael López	The Day You Begin	Finalist	
2018	Cori Doerrfeld	The Rabbit Listened	Finalist	
2018	Brian Lies	The Rough Patch	Finalist	
2019	Kate Read	One Fox: A Counting Book Thriller	Winner	
2019	Brendan Wenzel	A Stone Sat Still	Finalist	
2019	Matthew A. Cherry, illus. by Vashti Harrison	Hair Love	Finalist	
2019	Susanna Leonard Hill, illus. by Elisa Paganelli	Moon's First Friends: One Giant Leap for Friendship	Finalist	
2019	Dan Richards, illus. by Eric Barclay	Once Upon a Goat	Finalist	
2019	Monica Kulling, illus. by Sarah Dvojack	Ruby's Hope: A Story of How the Famous "Migrant Mother" Photograph Became the Face of the Great Depression	Finalist	
2019	Kwame Alexander, illus. by Kadir Nelson	The Undefeated	Finalist	
2020	Derrick Barnes, illus. by Gordon C. James	I Am Every Good Thing	Winner	
2020	Carrie Finison, illus. by Brianne Farley	Dozens of Doughnuts	Finalist	
2020	Jordan Scott, illus. by Sydney Smith	I Talk Like a River	Finalist	
2020	Marcero	In a Jar	Finalist	
2020	Jennifer K. Mann	The Camping Trip	Finalist	
2020	Helena Ku Rhee, illus. by Pascal Campion	The Paper Kingdom	Finalist	
2020	Carole Lindstrom, illus. by Michaela Goade	We Are Water Protectors	Finalist	
2021	Andrea Wang, illus. by Jason Chin	Watercress	Winner	
2021	Lori Mortensen, illus. by Rob Sayegh Jr.	Arlo Draws an Octopus	Finalist	
2021	Tyler Feder	Bodies Are Cool	Finalist	
2021	Amanda Gorman, illus. by Loren Long	Change Sings: A Children's Anthem	Finalist	
2021	Shannon Hale	Itty-Bitty Kitty-Corn	Finalist	
2021	Lisa Wheeler, illus. by Loren Long	Someone Builds the Dream	Finalist	
2021	Gideon Sterer, illus. by Di Giorgio	The Midnight Fair	Finalist	
2022	Christopher Denise	Knight Owl	Winner	
2022	Laura Gehl, illus. by Patricia Metola	Apple and Magnolia	Finalist	
2022	Sophie Blackall	Farmhouse	Finalist	
2022	Logan S. Kline	Finding Fire	Finalist	
2022	Naseem Hrab, illus. by Kelly Collier	How to Party Like a Snail	Finalist	
2022	Antwan Eady, illus. by Gracey Zhang	Nigel and the Moon	Finalist	
2022	Deborah Marcero	Out of a Jar	Finalist	
2023	Vashti Harrison	Big	Winner	
2023	Cori Doerrfeld	Beneath	Finalist	
2023	Monica Arnaldo	Mr. S: A First Day of School Book	Finalist	
2023	Julie Downing	Night in the City	Finalist	
2023	Jesús Trejo, illustrated by Eliza Kinkz	Papá's Magical Water-Jug Clock	Finalist	
2023	Mac Barnett, illustrated by Jon Klassen	The Three Billy Goats Gruff	Finalist	
2023	Hanh Bui, illustrated by Minnie Phan	The Yellow Áo Dài	Finalist	
2024	Mia Armstrong, illustrated by Alexandra Thompson	I am a Masterpiece!	Winner	
2024	Monique Duncan, illustrated by Oboh Moses	Freedom Braids	Finalist	
2024	Karol Hernández, illustrated by Lorena Alvarez Gómez	I Am La Chiva!: The Colorful Bus of the Andes	Finalist	
2024	Christy Mandin	Millie Fleur's Poison Garden	Finalist	
2024	Aaron Becker	The Last Zookeeper	Finalist	
2024	Cathy Stefanec Ogren, illustrated by Alexandra Thompson	The Little Red Chair	Finalist	
2024	Yewande Daniel-Ayoade and Ken Daley	The Little Regent	Finalist	

=== Middle grade ===
Year	Author	Title	Result	Ref.
2006	Laura Amy Schlitz	A Drowned Maiden's Hair: A Melodrama	Winner	
2006	Frank Cottrell-Boyce	Framed	Finalists	
2006	Mike Lupica	Heat	Finalists	
2006	Kirsten Miller	Kiki Strike	Finalists	
2006	Cynthia Kadohata	Weedflower	Finalists	
2007	Linda Urban	A Crooked Kind of Perfect	Winner	
2007	Kimberly Brubaker Bradley	Leap of Faith	Finalists	
2007	Cynthia Kadohata	Cracker: The Best Dog in Vietnam	Finalists	
2007	Kerry Madden	Louisiana's Song	Finalists	
2007	Sarah Miller	Miss Spitfire	Finalists	
2007	Pat Murphy	Wild Girls	Finalists	
2007	Lauren Tarshis	Emma Jean Lazarus Fell Out of a Tree	Finalists	
2007	Nathan D. Wilson	Leepike Ridge	Finalists	
2008	Siobhan Dowd	The London Eye Mystery	Winner	
2008	Lenore Look	Alvin Ho	Finalists	
2008	Helen Frost	Diamond Willow	Finalists	
2008	Wendy Mass	Every Soul a Star	Finalists	
2008	Frances O'Roark Dowell	Shooting the Moon	Finalists	
2009	Laurie Halse Anderson	Chains	Winner	
2009	Ann Burg	All the Broken Pieces	Finalist	
2009	Nora Raleigh Baskin	Anything But Typical	Finalist	
2009	Dean Pitchford	Captain Nobody	Finalist	
2009	Rosanne Parry	Heart of a Shepherd	Finalist	
2009	Sara Lewis Holmes	Operation Yes	Finalist	
2009	Barbara O'Connor	The Small Adventure of Popeye and Elvis	Finalist	
2010	Tom Angleberger	The Strange Case of Origami Yoda	Winner	
2010	Rob Buyea	Because of Mr. Terupt	Finalist	
2010	Stuart Gibbs	Belly Up	Finalist	
2010	Lisa Railsback	Betti on the High Wire	Finalist	
2010	Leslie Connor	Crunch	Finalist	
2010	Alan Silberberg	Milo: Sticky Notes and Brain Freeze	Finalist	
2010	Ellen Potter	The Kneebone Boy	Finalist	
2011	Elissa Brent Weissman	Nerd Camp	Winner	
2011	Tom Angleberger	Darth Paper Strikes Back	Finalist	
2011	G. Neri	Ghetto Cowboy	Finalist	
2011	Kirby Larson	The Friendship Doll	Finalist	
2011	Wendy Wan-Long Shang	The Great Wall of Lucy Wu	Finalist	
2011	Lisa Yee	Warp Speed	Finalist	
2011	Trent Reedy	Words in the Dust	Finalist	
2012	R. J. Palacio	Wonder	Winner	
2012	Joan Bauer	Almost Home	Finalist	
2012	Carl Hiaasen	Chomp	Finalist	
2012	Watt Key	Fourmile	Finalist	
2012	Rebecca Stead	Liar & Spy	Finalist	
2012	Lisa Harkrader	The Adventures of Beanboy	Finalist	
2012	Kristin Levine	The Lions of Little Rock	Finalist	
2013	David Carroll	Ultra	Winner	
2013	Chris Grabenstein	Escape from Mr. Lemoncello's Library	Finalist	
2013	Alan Gratz	Prisoner B-3087	Finalist	
2013	Ann E. Burg	Serafina's Promise	Finalist	
2013	Greg Pincus	The 14 Fibs of Gregory K.	Finalist	
2014	Dean Pitchford	Nickel Bay Nick	Winner	
2014	Varsha Bajaj	Abby Spencer Goes to Bollywood	Finalist	
2014	Dairman	All Four Stars	Finalist	
2014	Donna Gephart	Death by Toilet Paper	Finalist	
2014	Terry Lynn Johnson	Ice Dogs	Finalist	
2014	Kwame Alexander	The Crossover	Finalist	
2014	Megan Jean Sovern	The Meaning of Maggie	Finalist	
2015	Kevin Sands	The Blackthorn Key	Winner	
2015	Erin Entrada Kelly	Blackbird Fly	Finalist	
2015	Jennifer Chambliss Bertman	Book Scavenger	Finalist	
2015	Susan Vaught	Footer Davis Probably Is Crazy	Finalist	
2015	Thanhha Lai	Listen, Slowly	Finalist	
2016	Jason Reynolds	Ghost	Winner	
2016	Jennifer L. Holm	Full of Beans	Finalist	
2016	Joseph Marshall	In the Footsteps of Crazy Horse	Finalist	
2016	John David Anderson	Ms. Bixby's Last Day	Finalist	
2016	Sarah Weeks	Save Me a Seat	Finalist	
2016	Gordon Korman	Slacker	Finalist	
2016	Claire Legrand	Some Kind of Happiness	Finalist	
2017	Alan Gratz	Refugee	Winner	
2017	Hena Khan	Amina's Voice	Finalist	
2017	Steven B. Frank	Armstrong and Charlie	Finalist	
2017	Beth Vrabel	Caleb and Kit	Finalist	
2017	Dusti Bowling	Insignificant Events in the Life of a Cactus	Finalist	
2017	Gordon Korman	Restart	Finalist	
2017	Pablo Cartaya	The Epic Fail of Arturo Zamora	Finalist	
2018	Varian Johnson	The Parker Inheritance	Winner	
2018	Kelly Yang	Front Desk	Finalist	
2018	Jacqueline Woodson	Harbor Me	Finalist	
2018	Anne O'Brien Carelli	Skylark and Wallcreeper	Finalist	
2018	Jessie Janowitz	The Doughnut Fix	Finalist	
2018	Stacy McAnulty	The Miscalculations of Lightning Girl	Finalist	
2018	Anne Nesbet	The Orphan Band of Springdale	Finalist	
2019	Dan Gemeinhart	The Remarkable Journey of Coyote Sunrise	Winner	
2019	Barbara Dee	Maybe He Just Likes You	Finalist	
2019	Sarah Scheerger	Operation Frog Effect	Finalist	
2019	Lindsey Stoddard	Right as Rain	Finalist	
2019	Jamie Sumner	Roll with It	Finalist	
2019	Lynne Kelly	Song for a Whale	Finalist	
2019	Padma Venkatraman	The Bridge Home	Finalist	
2020	Janae Marks	From the Desk of Zoe Washington	Winner	
2020	Lauren Wolk	Echo Mountain	Finalist	
2020	Ernesto Cisneros	Efren Divided	Finalist	
2020	Kimberly Brubaker Bradley	Fighting Words	Finalist	
2020	Kacen Callender	King and the Dragonflies	Finalist	
2020	Ann Clare LeZotte	Show Me a Sign	Finalist	
2020	Aida Salazar	The Land of the Cranes	Finalist	
2021	Gordon Korman	Linked	Winner	
2021	Kate Albus	A Place to Hang the Moon	Finalist	
2021	Ellen Oh	Finding Junie Kim	Finalist	
2021	Ann Braden	Flight of the Puffin	Finalist	
2021	Caroline Gertler	Many Points of Me	Finalist	
2021	Chad Lucas	Thanks a Lot, Universe	Finalist	
2021	Barbara Dee	Violets Are Blue	Finalist	
2022	Amina Luqman-Dawson	Freewater	Winner	
2022	Tae Keller	Jennifer Chan Is Not Alone	Finalist	
2022	A. S. King	Attack of the Black Rectangles	Finalist	
2023	Erin Bow	Simon Sort of Says	Winner	
2023	Lindsay Lackey	Farther Than the Moon	Finalist	
2023	Torrey Maldonado	Hands	Finalist	
2023	James Bird	No Place Like Home	Finalist	
2023	Elisa Stone Leahy	Tethered to Other Stars	Finalist	
2023	Sally J. Pla	The Fire, the Water, and Maudie McGinn	Finalist	
2023	Claire Swinarski	What Happened to Rachel Riley?	Finalist	
2024	Lisa Yee, illustrated by Dan Santat	A Royal Conundrum	Winner	
2024	Alexandra Alessandri	Grow Up, Luchy Zapata	Finalist	
2024	Gayle Forman	Not Nothing	Finalist	
2024	Ruta Sepetys and Steve Sheinkin	The Bletchley Riddle	Finalist	
2024	Veera Hiranandani, Supriya Kelkar, Maulik Pancholy, Simran Jeet Singh, Aisha Saeed, Reem Faruqi, Rajani LaRocca, Naheed Hasnat, Sayantani DasGupta, Mitali Perkins, and Hena Khan (ed.)	The Door Is Open: Stories of Celebration and Community by 11 Desi Voices	Finalist	
2024	Gennifer Choldenko	The Tenth Mistake of Hank Hooperman	Finalist	
2024	Heather Smith	Tig	Finalist	

=== Young adult ===
Year	Author	Title	Result	Ref.
2006	Rachel Cohn and David Levithan	Nick and Norah's Infinite Playlist	Winner	
2006	Markus Zusak	The Book Thief	Finalists	
2006	Dana Reinhardt	Brief Chapter in My Impossible Life	Finalists	
2006	Kirby Larson	Hattie Big Sky	Finalists	
2006	Nancy Werlin	Rules of Survival	Finalists	
2007	Barry Lyga	Boy Toy	Winner	
2007	Sherman Alexie	The Absolutely True Diary of a Part-Time Indian	Finalists	
2007	Nancy Crocker	Billie Standish Was Here	Finalists	
2007	Catherine Gilbert Murdock	The Off Season	Finalists	
2007	Laura Resau	Red Glass	Finalists	
2007	Carrie Jones	Tips on Having a Gay (ex)Boyfriend	Finalists	
2007	Gary D. Schmidt	The Wednesday Wars	Finalists	
2008	E. Lockhart	The Disreputable History of Frankie Landau-Banks	Winner	
2008	Robin Benway	Audrey, Wait!	Finalists	
2008	C. K. Kelly Martin	I Know It's Over	Finalists	
2008	Melina Marchetta	On the Jellicoe Road	Finalists	
2008	Sara Zarr	Sweethearts	Finalists	
2008	Christine Fletcher	Ten Cents a Dance	Finalists	
2009	Courtney Summers	Cracked Up To Be	Winner	
2009	Michelle D. Kwasney	Blue Plate Special	Finalist	
2009	Brent Crawford	Carter Finally Gets It	Finalist	
2009	Natalie Standiford	How To Say Goodbye in Robot	Finalist	
2009	Julie Halpern	Into the Wild Nerd Yonder	Finalist	
2009	Justina Chen Headley	North of Beautiful	Finalist	
2009	Laurie Halse Anderson	Wintergirls	Finalist	
2010	Swati Avasthi	Split	Winner	
2010	Watt Key	Dirt Road Home	Finalist	
2010	Tara Kelly	Harmonic Feedback	Finalist	
2010	Erin McCahan	I Now Pronounce You Someone Else	Finalist	
2010	Mark Shulman	Scrawl	Finalist	
2010	Courtney Summers	Some Girls Are	Finalist	
2010	Lucy Christopher	Stolen	Finalist	
2011	Geoff Herbach	Stupid Fast	Winner	
2011	Stephanie Perkins	Anna and the French Kiss	Finalist	
2011	Ruta Sepetys	Between Shades of Gray	Finalist	
2011	Sophie Flack	Bunheads	Finalist	
2011	A. S. King	Everybody Sees the Ants	Finalist	
2011	Marianna Baer	Frost	Finalist	
2011	Joshua C. Cohen	Leverage	Finalist	
2012	Jesse Andrews	Me and Earl and the Dying Girl	Winner	
2012	Matthew Quick	Boy21	Finalist	
2012	Elizabeth Wein	Code Name Verity	Finalist	
2012	Eliot Schrefer	Endangered	Finalist	
2012	Barry Lyga	I Hunt Killers	Finalist	
2012	Antonia Michaelis	The Storyteller	Finalist	
2012	J.J. Johnson	The Theory of Everything	Finalist	
2013	Meg Medina	Yaqui Delgado Wants to Kick Your Ass	Winner	
2013	Evan Roskos	Dr. Bird's Advice for Sad Poets	Finalist	
2013	Rainbow Rowell	Eleanor & Park	Finalist	
2013	Ruta Sepetys	Out of the Easy	Finalist	
2013	Elizabeth Wein	Rose Under Fire	Finalist	
2013	Carrie Mesrobian	Sex & Violence	Finalist	
2014	Brandy Colbert	Pointe	Winner	
2014	Isabel Quintero	Gabi, a Girl in Pieces	Finalist	
2014	Gail Giles	Girls Like Us	Finalist	
2014	Jandy Nelson	I'll Give You the Sun	Finalist	
2014	Jason Reynolds	When I Was The Greatest	Finalist	
2015	Tamara Ireland Stone	Every Last Word	Winner	
2015	Courtney Summers	All the Rage	Finalist	
2015	Julie Murphy	Dumplin'	Finalist	
2015	Nicola Yoon	Everything, Everything	Finalist	
2015	Kekla Magoon	How It Went Down	Finalist	
2015	Elana K. Arnold	Infandous	Finalist	
2015	Susan Juby	The Truth Commission	Finalist	
2016	Ruta Sepetys	Salt to the Sea	Winner	
2016	Brittany Cavallaro	A Study in Charlotte	Finalist	
2016	Brie Spangler	Beast	Finalist	
2016	Kody Keplinger	Run	Finalist	
2016	Jeff Zentner	The Serpent King	Finalist	
2016	Karen Fortunati	The Weight of Zero	Finalist	
2016	Marieke Nijkamp	This Is Where It Ends	Finalist	
2017	Renée Watson	Piecing Me Together	Winner	
2017	Jared Reck	A Short History of the Girl Next Door	Finalist	
2017	Jennifer Mathieu	Moxie	Finalist	
2017	S. K. Ali	Saints and Misfits	Finalist	
2017	Angie Thomas	The Hate U Give	Finalist	
2017	Benjamin Alire Saenz	The Inexplicable Logic of My Life	Finalist	
2017	Erin McCahan	The Lake Effect	Finalist	
2018	Courtney Summers	Sadie	Winner	
2018	Adib Khorram	Darius the Great Is Not Okay	Finalist	
2018	Ashley Herring Blake	Girl Made of Stars	Finalist	
2018	Tiffany D. Jackson	Monday's Not Coming	Finalist	
2018	Ibi Zoboi	Pride	Finalist	
2018	Kody Keplinger	That's Not What Happened	Finalist	
2018	Bryan Bliss	We'll Fly Away	Finalist	
2019	Mindy McGinnis	Heroine	Winner	
2019	Nina Moreno	Don't Date Rosa Santos	Finalist	
2019	Gilly Segal	I'm Not Dying with You Tonight	Finalist	
2019	Angie Thomas	On the Come Up	Finalist	
2019	Randy Ribay	Patron Saints of Nothing	Finalist	
2019	Stacey Lee	The Downstairs Girl	Finalist	
2019	Elizabeth Acevedo	With the Fire on High	Finalist	
2020	Yamile Saied Méndez	Furia	Winner	
2020	Elizabeth Acevedo	Clap When You Land	Finalist	
2020	Nic Stone	Dear Justyce	Finalist	
2020	Marieke Nijkamp	Even If We Break	Finalist	
2020	Ibi Zoboi and Yusef Salaam	Punching the Air	Finalist	
2020	Nora Shalaway Carpenter	The Edge of Anything	Finalist	
2020	Leah Johnson	You Should See Me in a Crown	Finalist	
2021	Tess Sharpe	The Girls I've Been	Winner	
2021	Laura Taylor Namey	A Cuban Girl's Guide to Tea and Tomorrow	Finalist	
2021	Angie Thomas	Concrete Rose	Finalist	
2021	Angeline Boulley	Firekeeper's Daughter	Finalist	
2021	Jeff Zentner	In the Wild Light	Finalist	
2021	Malinda Lo	Last Night at the Telegraph Club	Finalist	
2021	Kimberly Jones and Gilly Segal	Why We Fly	Finalist	
2022	Jen Ferguson	The Summer of Bitter and Sweet	Winner	
2022	Sabaa Tahir	All My Rage	Finalist	
2022	Joya Goffney	Confessions of an Alleged Good Girl	Finalist	
2022	Ruta Sepetys	I Must Betray You	Finalist	
2022	Cory McCarthy	Man o' War	Finalist	
2022	Julia Walton	On the Subject of Unmentionable Things	Finalist	
2022	Aaron H. Aceves	This Is Why They Hate Us	Finalist	
2023	Jas Hammonds	We Deserve Monuments	Winner	
2023	Jonny Garza Villa	Ander & Santi Were Here	Finalist	
2023	Anna Sortino	Give Me a Sign	Finalist	
2023	Kim Johnson	Invisible Son	Finalist	
2023	Deb Caletti	Plan A	Finalist	
2023	Byron Graves	Rez Ball	Finalist	
2023	Ream Shukairy	The Next New Syrian Girl	Finalist	
2024	Randy Ribay	Everything We Never Had	Winner	
2024	K. Ancrum	Icarus	Finalist	
2024	Anna Sortino	On the Bright Side	Finalist	
2024	Jade Adia	Our Shouts Echo	Finalist	
2024	Kirstin Cronn-Mills	Rules for Camouflage	Finalist	
2024	Samira Ahmed	This Book Won't Burn	Finalist	
2024	Jason Reynolds	Twenty-Four Seconds from Now . . .: A LOVE Story	Finalist	

== See also ==
- Cybils Awards for Graphic Novel
- Cybils Awards for Nonfiction
- Cybils Awards for Speculative Fiction
