= Space Case =

Space Case may refer to:

- Space Case (film), a 1992 American science fiction comedy film
- Space Case, a 2001 film, starring Christopher Lloyd, produced by Weston Woods Studios
- "Space Case", an episode of Big Bad Beetleborgs
- "Space Case", an episode of Reading Rainbow
- "Space Case", an episode of Slimer! and the Real Ghostbusters
- Space Case (Transformers), a character in Transformers, one of the Cyberjets
- Space Case, a 2014 book by Stuart Gibbs, from the Moon Base Alpha series

== See also ==
- Space Cases, a 1996 TV series
