= Elisa Stone Leahy =

Peruvian-American children's book author

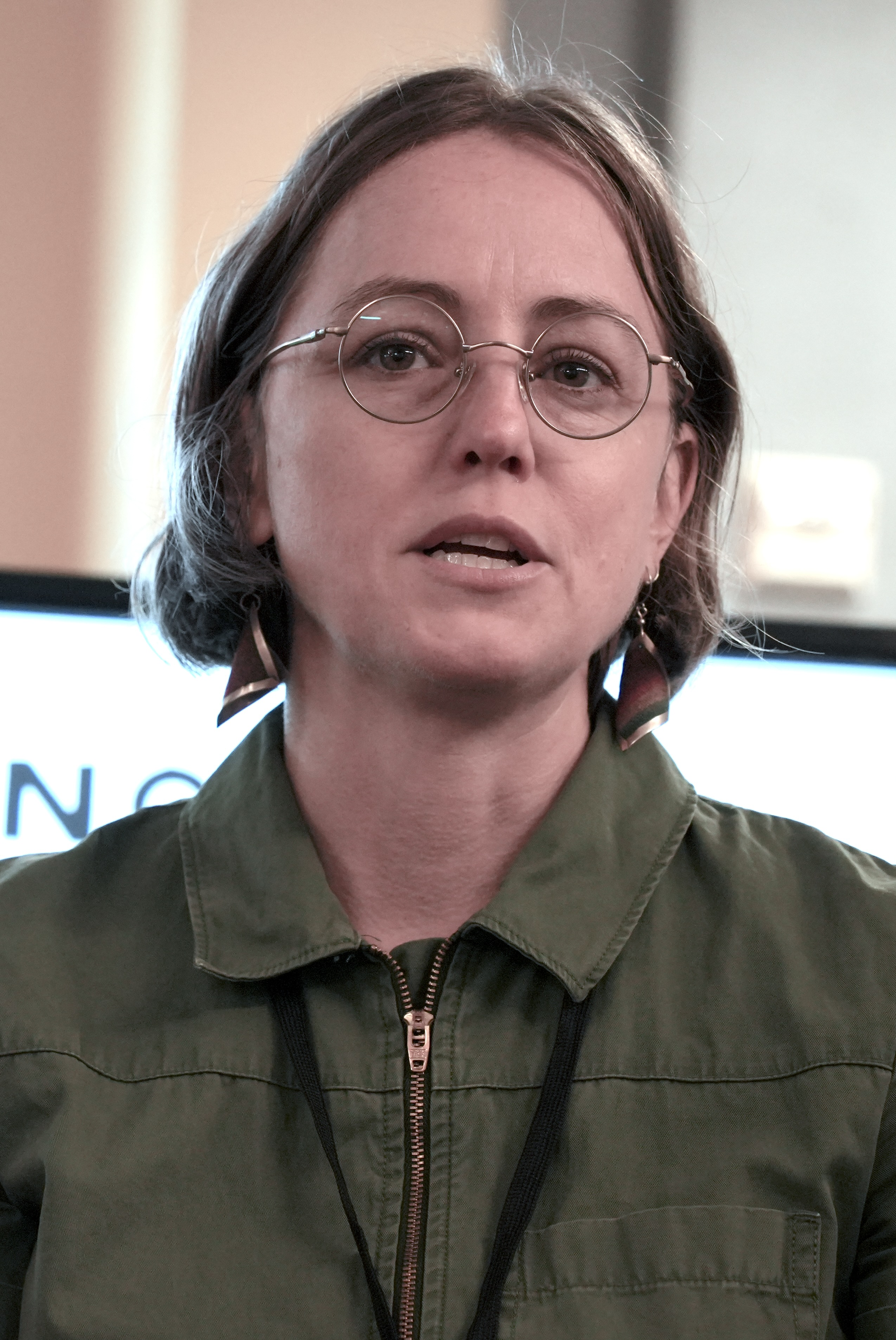
- Leahy at the Bay Area Book Festival in 2025
- Notable works: Tethered to Other Stars (2023); Mallory in Full Color (2024)

Website
- elisastoneleahy.com

Elisa Stone Leahy is a Peruvian-American children's book author. She is the author of Tethered to Other Stars (2023) and Mallory in Full Color (2024).

As of 2026, Leahy lives with her family in Columbus, Ohio.

== Writing ==
=== Tethered to Other Stars (2023) ===
Leahy's debut novel, Tethered to Other Stars, is a middle-grade novel published by Quill Tree Books on October 3, 2023. The book centers Wendy Celestina Toledo, a Salvadoran-Guatemalan seventh grader. After a raid from the United States Immigration and Customs Enforcement (ICE) results in several people disappearing from their neighborhood in Melborn, South Carolina, Wendy's family moves to Columbus, Ohio, where Wendy enters a class for gifted and talented students. Despite Wendy doing well with school, fear about ICE raids continue, and Wendy experiences racist bullying from classmates.

Tethered to Other Stars was well received by critics, including starred reviews from Kirkus Reviews and Publishers Weekly. Kirkus called the novel "a beautifully executed, character-driven tale of family, courage, resilience, and the meaning of what is right", while Publishers Weekly described it as "a powerful meditation on the difficult choice between what one views as right vs. safe with resounding empathy and skill".

Tethered to Other Stars was a finalist for the 2023 Cybils Award for Middle Grade Fiction.

=== Mallory in Full Color (2024) ===
Leahy's second novel, Mallory in Full Color, illustrated by Maine Diaz, is a middle-grade novel published by Quill Tree Books on November 19, 2024. The novel follows Mallory Marsh, a twelve-year old who is half-Korean and half-white and struggles with people pleasing. Mallory's primary interest is her sci-fi web comic, Metal-Plated Heart, published online under the pseudonym Dr. BotGirl, though she joins the competitive swim team to please her mother. At Comic Club, Mallory meets Noa, a non-binary student from whom she develops romantic feelings. The novel "explores themes of identity and finding one's voice".

Mallory in Full Color received a starred review from Shelf Awareness, whose Samantha Zaboski called the novel "punchy and empowering". Publishers Weekly described Mallory in Full Color as a "compassionate and imaginative novel", while Kirkus referred to it as "a sincere cautionary tale about finding one's voice and putting others' needs before one's own".

== Publications ==
- Tethered to Other Stars. Quill Tree Books. 2023. ISBN 978-0-063-25548-7.
- Mallory in Full Color. Quill Tree Books. 2024. ISBN 978-0-063-25553-1.
