= Kate Banks =

American children's writer (1960–2024)

- Born: Katherine Anne Banks; February 13, 1960 Farmington, Maine, United States
- Died: February 24, 2024 (aged 64) Basel, Switzerland
- Occupation: Writer

Katherine Anne Banks (February 13, 1960 – February 24, 2024) was an American children's writer. Her books, The Night Worker, won the 2001 Charlotte Zolotow Award, And If the Moon Could Talk won the 1998 Boston Globe-Horn Book Award for best picture book. Dillon Dillon was a finalist for the 2002 Los Angeles Times Book Prize for Young Adult Fiction. Howie Bowles, Secret Agent was nominated for the 2000 Edgar Allan Poe Award for Best Juvenile. Max’s Math won the 2016 Mathical Book Prize.

== Early life ==
Kate Banks was born on February 13, 1960, in Farmington, Maine. Her father was a history professor at the University of Maine who was killed in a botched robbery in 1979. Banks said that the grief she experienced after her father's murder influenced the themes of her novels.

== Career ==
While a student at Wellesley College, Kate Banks applied for an internship at the Atlantic Monthly Press, where she worked for two years in the children's books department. In 1984, she was hired by editor Frances Foster to work as her assistant at Knopf. Banks worked with Foster for five years before leaving to become a writer, with Foster editing her books for the following couple of decades.

Banks came up with the idea for her first book, Alphabet Soup, while still working with Foster, who encouraged her to write it down and paired the author with Peter Sís, an illustrator looking for work who had just arrived in New York.

== Personal life ==
Banks and her husband, Pierluigi Mezzomo, had two sons. They lived in Italy for several years before moving to France.

Banks lived with several major health issues. She was diagnosed with chronic fatigue syndrome in her twenties and had chronic pain from complications in childbirth. She also had mast cell activation syndrome, which left her unable to pursue treatment for neuroendocrine cancer, which she was diagnosed with in 2022.

== Death ==
Banks died through assisted suicide in Basel, Switzerland, on February 24, 2024, at the age of 64.

== Books ==
- Alphabet Soup, Dragonfly Books, 1988
- Big, Bigger, Biggest Adventure, Random House, 1991
- The Bunnysitters, Random House, 1991
- Peter and the Talking Shoes, Knopf, 1994
- Baboon, Frances Foster Books, 1997
- Spider Spider, Farrar, Straus and Giroux, 1997
- And If the Moon Could Talk, Frances Foster Books, 1998
- The Bird, the Monkey, and the Snake in the Jungle, Farrar, Straus and Giroux, 1999
- Howie Bowles, Secret Agent, Scholastic, 1999
- Howie Bowles and Uncle Sam, Farrar, Straus and Giroux, 2000
- The Night Worker, Frances Foster Books, 2000
- A Gift from the Sea, Frances Foster Books, 2001
- Mama’s Little Baby, DK Publishing, 2001
- Close Your Eyes, Frances Foster Books, 2002
- Dillon Dillon, Frances Foster Books, 2002
- The Turtle and the Hippopotamus, Farrar, Straus and Giroux, 2002
- Mama’s Coming Home, Frances Foster Books, 2003
- Walk Softly, Rachel, Frances Foster Books, 2003
- The Cat Who Walked Across France, Frances Foster Books, 2004
- Friends of the Heart/Amici del Cuore, Farrar, Straus and Giroux, 2005
- The Great Blue House, Frances Foster Books, 2005
- Max’s Words, Frances Foster Books, 2006
- Fox, Frances Foster Books, 2007
- Lenny’s Space, Frances Foster Books, 2007
- Max’s Dragon, Frances Foster Books, 2008
- Monkeys and Dog Days, Frances Foster Books, 2008
- Monkeys and the Universe, Frances Foster Books, 2009
- That’s Papa’s Way, Frances Foster Books, 2009
- What’s Coming for Christmas?, Frances Foster Books, 2009
- The Eraserheads, Frances Foster Books, 2010
- Max’s Castle, Frances Foster Books, 2011
- This Baby illustrated by Gabi Swiatkowska, Frances Foster Books, 2011
- The Magician's Apprentice, Frances Foster Books, 2012
- The Bear in the Book, Frances Foster Books, 2012
- Thank You, Mama illustrated by Gabi Swiatkowska, Frances Foster Books, 2013
- City Cat, illustrated by Lauren Castillo, Frances Foster Books, 2013
- Max’s Math, illustrated by Boris Kulikov, Frances Foster Books, 2015
- Boy's Best Friend, with Rupert Sheldrake, Farrar, Straus and Giroux, 2015
- How to Find an Elephant, Farrar, Straus and Giroux, 2017
