= C. K. Williams =

American poet, critic and translator (1936–2015)

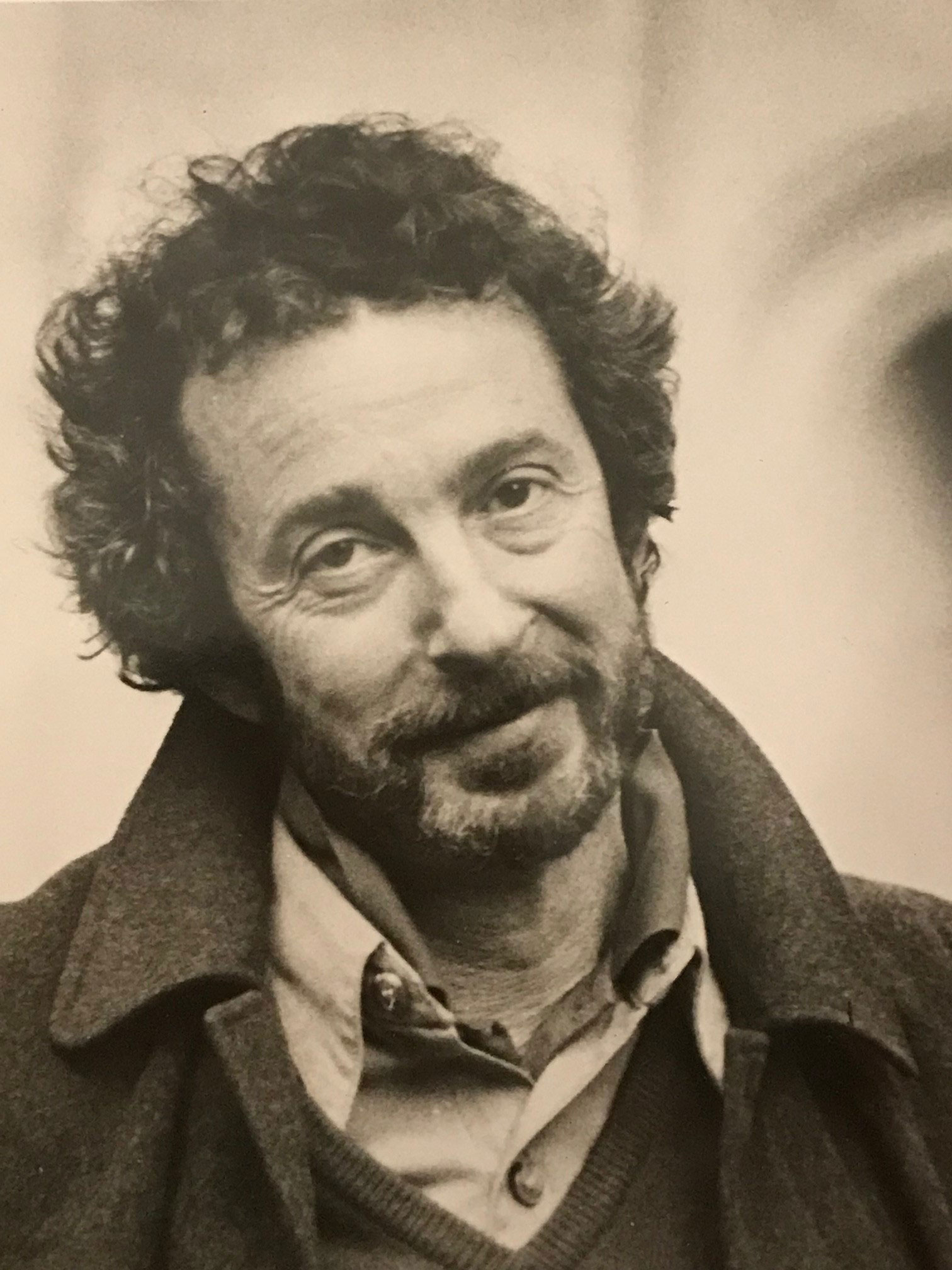
- C. K. Williams in 1986
- Born: Charles Kenneth Williams; November 4, 1936; Newark, New Jersey
- Died: September 20, 2015 (aged 78); Hopewell, New Jersey
- Education: Bucknell University; University of Pennsylvania (BA)
- Occupations: Writer, professor
- Spouse: Catherine Mauger
- Writing career
- Language: English
- Genre: Poetry
- Notable awards: Pulitzer Prize for Poetry; National Book Award; National Book Critics Circle Award

Charles Kenneth "C. K." Williams (November 4, 1936 – September 20, 2015) was an American poet, critic and translator. Williams won many poetry awards. Flesh and Blood won the National Book Critics Circle Award in 1987. Repair (1999) won the 2000 Pulitzer Prize for Poetry, was a National Book Award finalist and won the Los Angeles Times Book Prize. The Singing won the 2003 National Book Award and Williams received the Ruth Lilly Poetry Prize in 2005. The 2012 film The Color of Time relates aspects of Williams' life using his poetry.

== Life ==
The American poet C.K. Williams was born in Newark, New Jersey, on November 4, 1936. His parents were Paul B. Williams and Dossie Kasdin. His grandparents came to the US from Kiev, then a Ukrainian city within the Russian Empire, and Lvov, Ukraine.

He went to Columbia High School in Maplewood, attended Bucknell University for one year, then moved on to and graduated from the University of Pennsylvania.

He started writing poetry during his second year at Penn, and half-way through junior year he left for Paris. At that time, he wrote "I fell into a period of lacerating loneliness. I'd always been a little shy but now something, maybe my uncertainty about my identity as a poet, my sense of being a pretender, made me all but mute with strangers: I used to stay all day in my hotel room, reading, trying to write, then I'd go out to eat by myself, and take endless, anguished walks." When he returned to Penn, he switched major from philosophy to English. He studied poetry with Morse Peckham, who also mentioned that T.S. Eliot had written that if you wanted to be a poet, you had to write poetry every day, a recommendation Williams applied in his writing life.

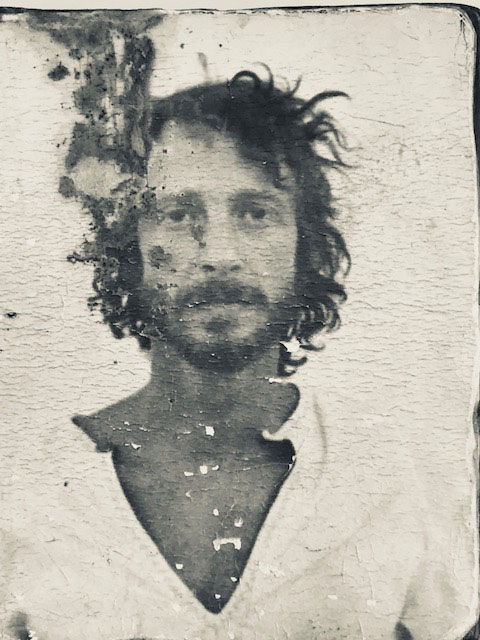
C.K. Williams passport ID photo taken on Greek island of Patmos in 1973

After graduating from Penn, he stayed in Philadelphia. His circle of friends included artists, carpenters, poets, a sociologist, photographers, musicians and film makers. He spent time with young architects who worked for Louis Kahn, and later wrote: "I realized that my image of the artist's calling had come almost entirely from Kahn: he was absolutely devoted to his craft, and expected the same dedication from everyone else." He published his first book, Lies, in 1969.

In 1963 he married Sarah Dean Jones, a printer who worked for Eugene Feldman at the Falcon Press in Philadelphia. The marriage ended in divorce. Their daughter, Jessie Williams Burns, founded Tursulowe Press in Philadelphia.

In 1973 he met Catherine Mauger. They married in 1975 and had a son, Jed Williams, a painter and the owner of an art gallery in Philadelphia. His paintings are often featured on the covers of Williams' books. Catherine and C.K. lived part of the year in the US, and part of the year in Paris, France, and later in Normandy.

Williams began teaching in the mid-'70s at the YM-YWHA in Philadelphia. He also worked as an assistant group therapist. He taught creative writing at different universities, among them, Franklin and Marshall, the University of California, Irvine, Boston University, Brooklyn College, Columbia University, George Mason University and, starting in 1996, Princeton University. He traveled across the country, and out of the country, giving readings and poetry workshops. He also worked on translations, notably of two Greek tragedies.

After publishing his second book, I Am the Bitter Name, Williams said that he had felt like giving up writing. Then he was asked to read at a college of art in Philadelphia, and he decided to read some unfinished poems: "and I was astonished to realize that they were exactly what I'd been waiting for, though I hadn't known I'd been waiting for anything at all. The poems were long, ragged lines, they had a much more conversational tone than the poems I'd been writing. Most importantly, the new poems, while having a much more narrative structure than the older ones, also had much more direct mechanisms for tracing thoughts, perceptions and emotions; they gave me a way to deal more inclusively and exhaustively with my own mind than the poems I'd been writing until then. I began to write poetry again, with more conviction than ever, and more confidence, more of a sense of what I wanted to do (…) The scope of the poems, the certainty they gave me that I could deal thoroughly with themes that interested me, were enough to keep me going. They are the poems that were collected in With Ignorance and Tar."

C.K. Williams became a member of the American Academy of Arts and Letters in 2003. He had a wide circle of friends in the U.S. and in Europe, many of them artists and writers. He gave a last reading and interview at Drew University in June 2015. He was diagnosed with multiple myeloma in the summer of 2013. He died at home in Hopewell, New Jersey on September 20, 2015. Twenty days earlier, he had finished working on the manuscript of his last book of poems, Falling Ill.

== Works ==
His first book, Lies, was published in 1969. Much of his early and mid-career work appeared in Poems 1963-1983 (1988). His Collected Poems appeared in 2006, of which Peter Campion wrote in The Boston Globe: "Throughout the five decades represented in his new Collected Poems, Williams has maintained the most sincere, and largest, ambitions. Like Yeats and Lowell before him, he writes from the borderland between private and public life…(His poems) join skeptical intelligence and emotional sincerity, to make sense of the world and ourselves. C.K. Williams has set a new standard for American poetry."

His book Repair won the Pulitzer Prize in 2000, and in 2003 The Singing won the National Book Award. He also wrote essays, plays, children's books, and did translations. His final collection of poetry was the posthumously published Falling Ill (2017).

== Bibliography ==
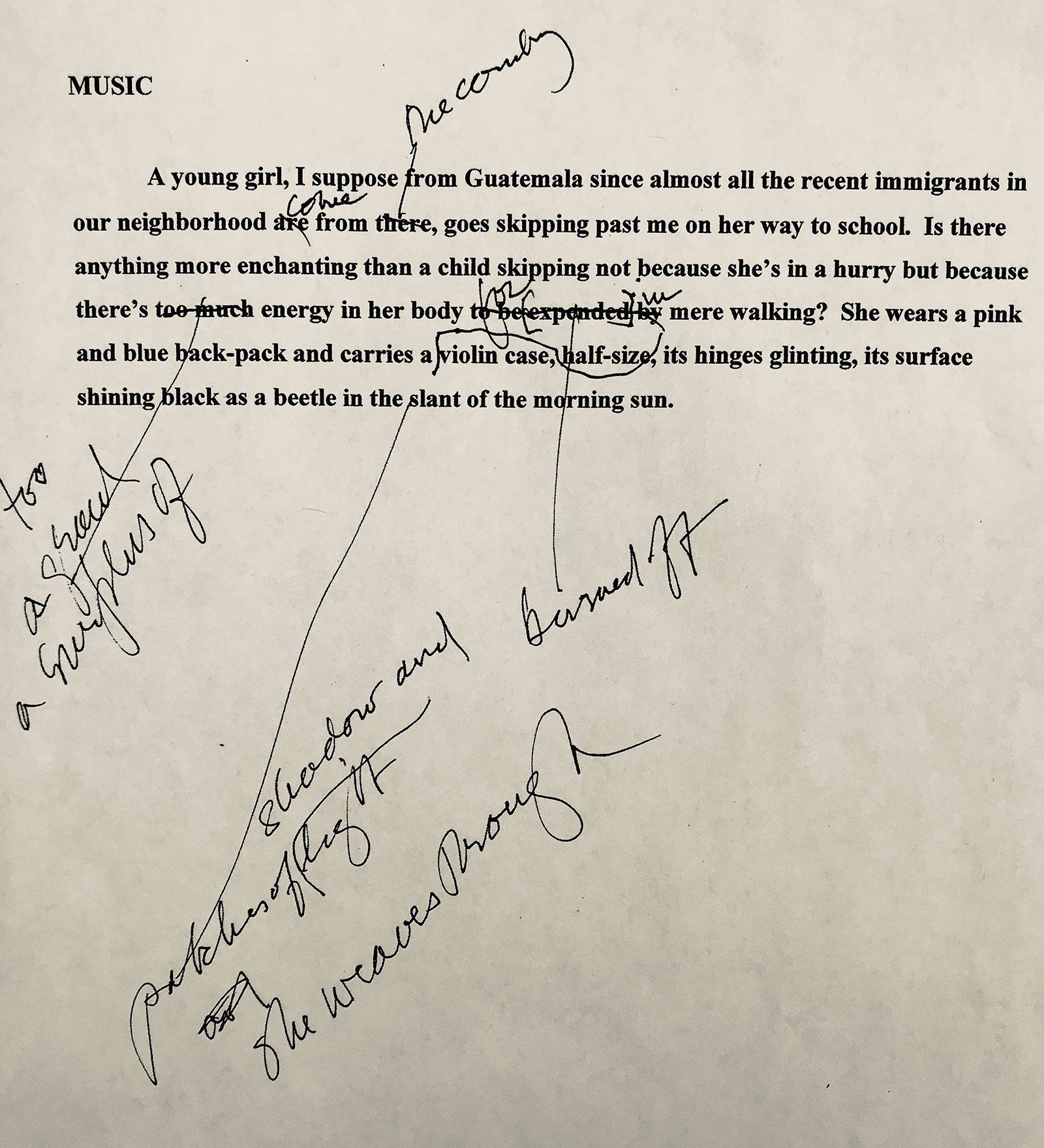
C. K. Williams, Draft of unpublished poem titled Music circa 2004.

=== Poetry ===
Collections

- A Day for Anne Frank, Falcon Press, Philadelphia, 1968.
- Lies, Houghton Mifflin Company, Boston, 1969.
- I Am the Bitter Name, Houghton Mifflin, Boston, 1972.
- With Ignorance, Houghton Mifflin, Boston, 1977.
- Tar, Random House, New York, 1983.
- The Lark. The Thrush. The Starling. Poems from Issa, Burning Deck Press, Providence, 1983.
- Flesh and Blood, Farrar Straus and Giroux, New York, 1987; Bloodaxe Books, Newcastle, 1988.
- Poems 1963–1983, Farrar Straus and Giroux, New York, 1988; Bloodaxe Books, Newcastle, 1988.
- Helen, Orchises Press, 1991.
- A Dream of Mind, Poems, Farrar Straus and Giroux, New York, 1992; Bloodaxe Books, Newcastle, 1992.
- Selected Poems, Farrar Straus and Giroux, 1994.
- New and Selected Poems, Bloodaxe Books, Newcastle, 1995.
- The Vigil, Farrar Straus and Giroux, 1997.
- Repair, Farrar Straus and Giroux; Bloodaxe Books, 1999.
- Love About Love, Ausable Press, 2001.
- The Singing, Farrar Straus and Giroux; Bloodaxe Books, 2003.
- Collected Poems, Farrar Straus and Giroux; Bloodaxe Books, 2006.
- Creatures, Green Shade, Haverford, 2006.
- Wait, Farrar Straus and Giroux; Bloodaxe Books, 2010.
- Crossing State Lines, Farrar Straus and Giroux, 2011.
- Writers Writing Dying, Farrar Straus and Giroux, 2012.
- All at Once, Farrar, Straus and Giroux, 2014.
- Selected Later Poems, Farrar, Straus and Giroux, 2015
- Falling Ill, Farrar, Straus and Giroux, 2017
- C. K. Williams: Wiersze/Poems. Wybrał, z angielskiego przełozył i opracował Ryszard Mierzejewski, 2024

List of poems

| Title | Year | First published | Reprinted/collected |
|---|---|---|---|
| Exhaust | 2010 | Williams, C. K. (May 24, 2010). "Exhaust". The New Yorker. Vol. 86, no. 14. pp. 48–49. | |

=== Prose ===
- Misgivings, My Mother, My Father, Myself, Farrar Straus and Giroux, 2000.
- Catherine's Laughter, Sarabande Books, 2013.

=== Essays and criticism ===
- Poetry and Consciousness; University of Michigan Press, 1998.
- On Whitman, Princeton University Press, Princeton, NJ, 2010.
- In Time: Poets, Poems, and the Rest, University of Chicago Press, 2012.

=== Plays ===
- The Operated Jew
- Creatures of Love

=== Translations ===
- Women of Trachis, translated from Sophocles, with Gregory Dickerson, Oxford University Press, New York, London, 1978.
- The Lark, The Thrush, The Starling, Poems from Issa, Burning Deck, 1983.
- The Bacchae, translated from Euripides, with an introduction by Martha Nussbaum, Farrar Straus and Giroux, 1990.
- Canvas, translation from the Polish of Adam Zagajewski, with Renata Gorczynski and Benjamin Ivry, Farrar Straus and Giroux, 1991.
- Selected Poems of Francis Ponge, with John Montague and Margaret Guiton, Wake Forest University Press, 1994.

=== Books Published in French ===
- Chair et Sang, Orphée La Différence, 1993
- Gratitude, Editeurs Le Gui et Jacques Darras, 1996
- Anthologie Personnelle: Poèmes, Actes Sud, 2001
- Dissentiments, Actes Sud, 2006

=== Books edited ===
- The Selected and Last Poems of Paul Zweig, edited and with an introduction by C. K. Williams, Wesleyan University Press, 1989.
- The Essential Hopkins, edited and with an introduction by C. K. Williams, Ecco Press, 1993.

=== Children's books ===
- How the Nobble Was Finally Found, Houghton Mifflin Harcourt, Boston, 2009.
- A Not Scary Story About Big Scary Things illustrated by Gabi Swiatkowska, Houghton Mifflin Harcourt, 2010.

=== Miscellaneous ===
- Solitudes, a song cycle, set by Ronald Surak, 1970.
- Script consultant for a film by David Lynch, The Grandmother.
- Criminals, a film by Joseph Strick, narrative by C. K. Williams, 1994.
- Crossing State Lines, Farrar, Straus and Giroux, 2011.
- The Color of Time, a movie produced by James Franco, 2012.

== Awards and honors ==
- John Simon Guggenheim Fellowship, 1974.
- Bernard Conner Prize, The Paris Review, 1983.
- Nominee, National Book Critics Circle Award, for Tar, 1983.
- National Endowment for the Arts Fellowship, 1985 and 1993.
- National Book Critics Circle Award for Poetry, for Flesh and Blood, 1987.
- Finalist, Pulitzer Prize, for Flesh and Blood, 1987.
- Jerome Shestack Prize, The American Poetry Review, 1988, 1996.
- Morton Dauwen Zabel Prize of the American Academy of Arts and Letters, 1989.
- Woodrow Wilson-Lila Wallace Fellow, 1992–93.
- Nominee, National Book Critics Circle Award, for A Dream of Mind, 1992.
- Lila Wallace-Reader's Digest Writer's Award, 1993.
- Harriet Monroe Poetry Award, Poetry, 1993.
- Nominee, National Book Critics Circle Award, for The Vigil, 1997.
- Finalist, Pulitzer Prize, for The Vigil, 1997.
- PEN/Voelcker Award for Poetry, 1998.
- Berlin Prize, American Academy in Berlin, 1998.
- Finalist, National Book Award, for Repair, 1999.
- American Academy of Arts and Letters Literature Award, 1999
- Weathertop Poetry Award for Repair, 2000.
- Maurice English Award for Repair, 2000.
- Los Angeles Times Book Award for Repair, 2000.
- Pulitzer Prize, for Repair, 2000.
- Pen/Albrand Memoir Award, for Misgivings, 2001.
- National Book Award, for The Singing, 2003.
- Ruth Lilly Poetry Prize, 2005.
- Milton Kessler Poetry Prize, Binghamton University, 2012.
- Jewish Book Prize, 2012.

== Events ==
- A Piano and Poetry Recital. Richard Goode and C.K. Williams : a Princeton University concert on March 9, 2014, at Richardson Auditorium. The recital was recorded.
- Dedication of "Garden", a poem by C.K. Williams, in October 2016, in the Poetry Trail of the D & R Greenway Land Trust : 1, Preservation Place, Princeton, N.J. 08540.
- "Recording available". media.sas.upenn.edu. April 11, 2016.
- A Tribute to C.K. Williams took place at The New School in New York City on February 22, 2017. The event was recorded.

== Archives ==
- C. K. Williams Papers. Yale Collection of American Literature, Beinecke Rare Book and Manuscript Library, Yale University.
