= K. Ancrum =

American speculative fiction author

- Born: June 15, 1991 (age 35)
- Other name: Kayla Ancrum
- Education: Dominican University
- Years active: 2017–present
- Website: kancrum.com

Kayla M. Ancrum (born June 15, 1991) is an American author of young adult speculative fiction. She debuted with The Wicker King (2017). Her fourth novel Icarus (2024) won a Lambda Literary Award, while her fifth novel The Corruption of Hollis Brown (2025) won a Mythopoeic Award.

== Early life ==
Ancrum was born in Maryland and grew up in Chicago. She began writing at age 12. She initially studied Fashion Merchandising at Dominican University before switching to English and Creative Writing, graduating in 2013.

== Career ==
Upon graduating from Dominican University, Ancrum signed her first book deal with Macmillan Publishers, through which she published her debut novel The Wicker King in 2017. She originally wrote the story for a friend "who felt alone in his bi identity". School Library Journal reviewer Cary Frostick called it a "haunting and provocative read that will keep teens riveted."

This was followed in 2019 by Ancrum's second novel The Weight of the Stars, a lesbian science fiction romance. The Weight of the Stars was a 2019 Locus magazine pick. Ancrum wrote her first two novels in a "vignette" format. Ancrum's third novel, published in 2021 via Imprint (Macmillan), was a thriller retelling of J. M. Barrie's Peter Pan titled Darling, set in contemporary Chicago.

Announced in 2022, HarperTeen acquired the rights to publish Ancrum's fourth novel Icarus, a reimagining of the titular Greek myth as a modern queer coming-of-age story, in 2024. Icarus won a Lambda Literary Award in the Young Adult category, appeared on the Publishers Weekly list of best books of 2024, and was a finalist for a Cybils Award for Fiction. In a starred review for BookPage, Mariel Fechik called the book "a beautiful representation of queer love and a sharp, artful subversion of the original Greek Mythos."

In 2025, HarperCollins published Ancrum's fifth novel The Corruption of Hollis Brown, a queer ghost story set in small town Michigan. It was longlisted for the National Book Award for Young People's Literature and nominated for a Los Angeles Times Book Prize in the Young Adult Literature category. Allie Stevens of School Library Journal described the novel as "a profoundly beautiful, achingly romantic journey."

Ancrum's sixth novel Adam, Mine., a dual-perspective retelling of Frankenstein, is forthcoming from HarperCollins in September 2026.

== Personal life ==
Ancrum is bisexual and intersex. She has ADHD.

== Bibliography ==
=== Novels ===
- The Wicker King (2017)
- The Weight of the Stars (2019)
- Darling (2021)
- Icarus (2024)
- The Corruption of Hollis Brown (2025)
- Adam, Mine. (2026)
- Ellie Ellie (forthcoming)
- Dead End Daryl (forthcoming)

=== Novellas ===
- The Legend of the Golden Raven (The Wicker King #1.5) (2017)

=== Anthologies ===
- The Way That Madness Lies (2021)
- Tasting Light (2022)
- Out There: Into the Queer New Yonder (2022)

== Accolades ==
Year	Award	Category	Title	Result	Ref.
2024	Cybils Awards for Fiction	Young adult	Icarus	Shortlisted	
2025	Lambda Literary Awards	LGBTQ+ Young Adult	Icarus	Won	
2025	National Book Awards	Young People's Literature	The Corruption of Hollis Brown	Longlisted	
2026	Los Angeles Times Book Prize	Young Adult Novel	The Corruption of Hollis Brown	Shortlisted	
2026	Mythopoeic Awards	Young Adult Literature	The Corruption of Hollis Brown	Won	
