= Icarus (novel) =

2024 young adult novel by K. Ancrum

- Language: K. Ancrum
- Genre: Young adult
- Publisher: HarperTeen
- Publication date: March 26, 2024
- Pages: 400
- ISBN: 978-0063285781

Icarus is a 2024 young adult novel by K. Ancrum. It follows Icarus, a teenage art thief who falls in love with the son of his target and tries to help him escape his abusive father. It won the 2025 Lambda Literary Award for Young Adult Literature.

== Plot ==
Since he was twelve years old, seventeen-year-old bisexual Icarus Gallagher has assisted his father Angus in his years-long revenge scheme against Mr. Stuart Black. Angus, previously have done the role himself, has trained him to be a thief. Icarus regularly breaks into Mr. Black's mansion, taking pictures of the many famous art pieces in Mr. Black's possession, and later returns to replace them with forgeries crafted by Angus. The two live in a small apartment, and Icarus notes that although his father makes substantial money as an art restorer, he insists on carrying out his schemes. Additionally, he makes it so that Icarus only has one acquaintance in each class at school and is not allowed to get close to anyone.

When Mr. Black leaves for a week-long trip to New York, Angus arranges for Icarus to break into his house three times in the next week. On the third trip he is found by a boy, who recognizes Icarus's physical similarities to Angus and concludes that Angus is his father. Icarus flees, and the boy yells that he is Helios Black. Icarus does not tell his father of the incident. Days later, Angus sends him to Mr. Black's house again. While in Mr. Black's storage, Helios enters the room and closes the door behind him. Helios reveals he is Mr. Black's son. For the last few weeks, Helios has been kept isolated in Mr. Black's mansion, and Mr. Black intends to keep home alone until he turns eighteen in a year, with an ankle monitor to prevent him from running away. He promises not to report Icarus if he keeps him company.

In the coming days, Icarus regularly visits Helios. Icarus also grows closer with two of his school acquaintances, Luca and Celestina. During one visit, Icarus tells Helios about their fathers's pasts; Angus was once contracted by Mr. Black to create a painting, with Angus seeking to use the funds for his wife's cancer treatment. When his wife's condition worsened, he asked for an upfront payment, but Mr. Black refused and Icarus's mother died. Helios in turn reveals that Mr. Black kicked him and his mother out when he was eight and that he hadn't seen Mr. Black until the events of his arrest, which is why he has the ankle monitor.

Eventually, Icarus arranges to take a week off school to be with Helios while Mr. Black is away. During his stay, the boys kiss, and Helios comes out as intersex to him. When the two dance, Helios realizes that Icarus has Ehlers-Danlos syndrome due to his flexibility. Helios also reveals that the reason he has the ankle monitor is that he used to take opioids. At a party, he relapsed with a friend and the two needed to be hospitalized, resulting in his arrest. Later, while Icarus and Helios are in Helios's mother's art studio, Mr. Black arrives home unexpectedly early. Icarus manages to escape unseen through a bathroom window, but overhears Mr. Black choking Helios.

Icarus tries filing an anonymous domestic abuse report, but due to the long wait time for a case worker decides to help Helios break out and then run away with him. He tells Luca and Celestina about his plan and they agree to help them. Icarus also reveals his plan to Angus, and Angus lets him go but does not assist. In Mr. Black's house, Icarus removes Helios's ankle monitor with a saw, however Mr. Black catches them escaping and holds down Icarus. Mr. Black is surprised to learn about Icarus, and decides that with Icarus being nearly eighteen, he will have Icarus tried as an adult. Icarus manages to break free from Mr. Black's grasp and tries escape by jumping out a window with Helios, but the rope holding them snaps and the two fall.

Icarus and Helios end up hospitalized. While he recovers, Angus appears in Icarus's hospital room, and tells him Mr. Black has allowed Icarus to go free in exchange for Angus becoming a wanted criminal. Angus then leaves through Icarus's hospital window. The book ends with Icarus and Helios, temporarily staying with Luca and Celestina, making plans to go to Paris.

== Reception ==
Icarus received starred reviews from Publishers Weekly, Kirkus Reviews, BookPage, and Booklist, being additionally positively reviewed by School Library Journal. Publishers Weekly described the book as "a subversive triumph that is a love letter both to healing from trauma and to the importance of connection and empathy," while Kirkus Reviews dubbed it a "slow-burn mystery fueled by a few broken people and a heavy dose of caring ones." Michael Cart of Booklist praised the development of Icarus and Helios, further commenting on the book's appeal even beyond a young adult audience and calling it "psychologically acute, subtle, and sophisticated."

In a review of the audiobook narrated by Kirt Graves, Kirkus Reviews said "Graves's pace is consistent and leisurely, allowing the romance to build slowly."

=== Accolades ===
Year	Award	Result	Ref
2025	Lambda Literary Award for Young Adult Literature	Won	
2025	American Library Association Rainbow Book List - Teen Readers	Top Ten	
2024	Cybils Award for Fiction - Young Adult	Shortlisted	
2024	Publishers Weekly Best Young Adult Books of the Year	Included	
