= Belly Up =

2010 book by Stuart Gibbs

- First edition (publ. Simon & Schuster)
- Author: Stuart Gibbs
- Language: English
- Publication date: 2010

Belly Up is a 2010 children's mystery novel by author Stuart Gibbs. The story is set in FunJungle, the largest zoo in America and the only zoo/theme park, which is built in the middle of the Texas Hill Country and owned by billionaire J.J. McCracken. The story is set from the view of Teddy Fitzroy, a 12-year-old boy who is the son of a photographer and a gorilla researcher, and his friend Summer, J.J.'s daughter, investigate the suspicious death of Henry Hippo, FunJungle's mascot.

== Plot ==
In FunJungle, a fictional zoo/theme park in Texas, 12-year old Theodore "Teddy" Fitzroy, whose dad is a photographer and his mom is a gorilla researcher who both work at FunJungle, is caught giving water balloons to the monkeys by his nemesis, "Large" Marge O'Malley, a notorious and unintelligent security guard. Marge's report is then ruined when Buck Grassley, the head of security, reports that Henry Hippo is dead. Doc Deakin, the cranky head veterinarian, decides to perform an autopsy against the wishes of Martin del Gato, the director of operations. Teddy sneaks into FunJungle's theater where the autopsy is being held and secretly watches the autopsy. There Teddy discovers that Doc thinks Henry died from peritonitis induced by sharp items he swallowed, with Doc concluding the death was murder; however, Martin forces the vet to keep it under wraps. Against his mother's wishes and when the police don't take him seriously, Teddy decides to investigate Henry's enclosure.

The next day, Teddy meets Summer McCracken, the celebrity daughter of FunJungle's billionaire owner J.J. McCracken, who dislikes the attention of fans and has a habit of ditching her bodyguards in disguise to experience a normal life. Summer and Teddy sneak into Henry's pool to investigate his death, finding a metal ball with sharp points, revealed to be a toy jack from the gift shop filed down, and a groove in the bottom with a chain. When Teddy confronts Doc, the panicked vet takes the jack from him in the operating room, but not before Teddy sees a dead jaguar on the table.

Teddy is then set up when a text seemingly from Summer that lures him to the black mamba cage, which is cut open with the deadly snake appearing to have escaped, and it is not found. It is also discovered that the security footage was missing around the time of the incident. Forced to sneak out of his mother's clutches and meet Summer to talk to Charlie Conner, a disgruntled employee who once was bitten by Henry, Teddy finds out that Charlie overheard Pete Thwacker, the incompetent head of public relations, and Marge O'Malley plotting to kill Henry after he fired feces at visitors. Teddy talks to Buck about his suspicions, with Buck revealing that Charlie was a former armed robber. Buck then asks Teddy to obey his mother and leave investigating to the experts.

After a tiger is released from its pit near Teddy and Doc, both Teddy and his parents become suspicious that something more than Henry's murder is going on and they seek out a list of recently deceased animals, finding out that all but one large animal that died before Henry were from the Amazon rainforest. The family use the cover of Henry's funeral to sneak into the administration building and look through the blueprints for the hippo exhibit to find out the reason for the groove Teddy found, discovering that J.J. McCracken plans to build thrill rides through several animal exhibits. Teddy's parents are arrested and Teddy is chased through the funeral until an accident involving Henry's corpse exploding stops the pursuit, allowing Teddy to escape and contact Doc.

Doc explains that he suspects Martin in Henry's murder due to his involvement in an emerald-smuggling scheme in which South American gems were stitched inside zoo animals from the same region. It is revealed that Martin blackmailed Doc to keep his illegal activities secret by threatening to turn in his daughter, a member of the Animal Liberation Front (who were also briefly Henry murder suspects), for blowing up a meat-packing plant. After being chased yet again, Teddy reaches J.J. and is able to present the evidence given by Doc in his office. Both Martin and Buck are exposed as Henry's murderers, with the revelation that Buck killed him in an attempt to force out a bag of emeralds Henry had accidentally swallowed when Buck cornered Martin with them. The story ends with Marge O'Malley being promoted after stopping Buck's escape attempt, J.J. promising to hold off on the rides, and Teddy and Summer watching the birth of Henry's son a month later.

== Reception ==
Kirkus Reviews stated in its review "Overall, the story is great fun, despite a sometimes plodding approach to the narrative that is too reminiscent of a report. In his authorial debut, screenwriter Gibbs combines details of the inner workings of zoos with some over-the-top action for an entertaining read". Publishers Weekly, wrote "A likable protagonist, a very kid-friendly brand of humor, and the outrageous setting should keep readers' interest, especially animal lovers". Common Sense Media gave Belly Up four out of five stars and said in its review of the book, "At times Fitzroy's voice is a bit more adult-like than one might expect from a 12-year-old boy, and the jokes can be a little dated, but this is a fun, engaging read that moves through suspense as if it written for the big screen."

== Sequels ==
Belly Up is the first installment in the FunJungle Collection, which takes place at a zoo/theme park in central Texas. Other books in the series are Poached (2014), which is about a stolen koala with Teddy being the prime suspect; Big Game (2015), a rare pregnant Asian rhino is threatened by mysterious gunshots; Panda-monium (2017) an abducted giant panda and Marge O'Malley asking Teddy to solve the case before the FBI, which includes her sister; Lion Down (2019), a mountain lion falsely accused of killing a famous dog; Tyrannosaurus Wrecks (2020), a T-Rex skull is stolen, Bear Bottom (2021), bison disappear from a ranch; and Whale Done (2023), a dead whale found on a beach in Malibu explodes. And in All Ears (2025), he has to save his best friend from being framed for vandalism, while saving an African elephant. And in ‘’Ape Escape’’ (2026), he must save a baby gorilla, and solve another case back at FunJungle.
