= Julie Halpern =

American novelist

- Occupation: Author
- Spouse: Matthew Cordell
- Writing career
- Genre: Young adult fiction
- Website: juliehalpern.com

Julie Halpern is an American author of popular young adult novels. She is married to the children's book author and illustrator Matthew Cordell, with whom she created the picture book Toby and the Snowflakes.

Halpern's teen novels focus on the challenges facing teens who are outsiders. Her debut novel Get Well Soon tells the story of a teenage girl in a mental institution, where she goes after suffering from depression. Her second novel, Into the Wild Nerd Yonder, is about a girl who struggles with high school social labels when she meets a new group of friends who play Dungeons & Dragons.

== Awards and honors ==
In 2007, Kirkus Reviews named Get Well Soon one of the best young adult novels of the year.

In 2012, Have a Nice Day was named one of the best young adult novels of the year by Kirkus Reviews and Bank Street College of Education.

Awards for Halpern's writing
Year	Title	Award	Result	Ref.
2012	Into the Wild Nerd Yonder	Popular Paperbacks for Young Adults	Selection	
2013	Have a Nice Day	ALA Best Fiction for Young Adults	Selection	

== Publications ==
- Toby and the Snowflakes, Houghton Mifflin Harcourt, 2004
- Get Well Soon, Feiwel & Friends, 2007
- Into the Wild Nerd Yonder, Feiwel & Friends, 2009
- Don’t Stop Now, Feiwel & Friends, 2011
- Have a Nice Day, Feiwel & Friends, 2012
- The F- It List, Feiwel & Friends, 2013
- Maternity Leave, Thomas Dunne Books, 2015
- Meant to Be, Feiwel & Friends, 2017
- Girl on the Ferris Wheel (with Len Vlahos), Feiwel & Friends, 2021
