= Hattie Big Sky =

2006 book by Kirby Larson

- Author: Kirby Larson
- Language: English
- Genre: Chapter book
- Publisher: Yearling Books
- Publication date: 2006
- Publication place: United States
- Media type: Print
- Pages: 289 pages
- ISBN: 978-0385735957

Hattie Big Sky is a children's historical novel by Kirby Larson, published in 2006. In 2007 the book was named a Newbery Honor book and an American Library Association Best Book for Young Adults. Hattie Big Sky was also an Illinois Rebecca Caudill Award nominee.

== Plot ==
The novel is set during World War I. Hattie Brooks, a sixteen-year-old orphan who has tired of being shuttled between relatives she hardly knows, receives a letter from an uncle who has recently died. He leaves her all of his land, and Hattie travels to his farm in Montana to start life as a homesteader. She has less than a year to prove herself capable of taking care of the land. In the book we learn about Hattie through her letters to her friend Charlie who is at war, and to her Uncle Holt. One difficulty Hattie faces is being called upon, as a loyal American, to shun her kind neighbors because of their German descent.

== Critical reception ==
According to Sharon Morrison in School Library Journal: "Larson's vivid descriptions of the harshness of the work and the extreme climates, and the strength that comes from true friendship, create a masterful picture of the homesteading experience and the people who persevered." Morrison also said "it was a heartwarming yet poignant story about homesteading in early-20th-century Montana." Kathleen Odean in Booklist praised Larson: "Writing in figurative language that draws on nature and domestic detail to infuse her story with the sounds, smells, and sights of the prairie, she created a richly textured novel full of memorable characters." Sally Miculek in Booklist describes the story as being "historical fiction at its best."

== Adaptation ==
A play adaptation of the novel, written by Cassy Maxton-Whitacre, was announced on January 3, 2025. On March 28, 2025, the world premiere of Hattie Big Sky was performed in Staunton, VA at ShenanArts.

Original Cast of Cassy Maxton-Whitacre's Play Adaptation of Hattie Big Sky
Character	World Premiere
Hattie Brooks	Charlotte Hadfield
Charlie Hawley	Noah Brown
Perilee Muller	Sarah Wendtlandt
Karl Muller	Sam Hostetter
Leafie Purvis	Elizabeth Brandon
Traft Martin	Shaye Klingensmith
Aunt Ivy	Melissa Hostetter
Uncle Holt	David Lusk
Mr. Ebgard	Ryan Workman
Mrs. Martin	Stacey Fregosi
Traft's Man	Garner Coiner
Ensemble	Xander Burdette, Jordan Huffer, Maddie Little-Thornton
