= I Must Betray You =

Historical fiction novel

- Author: Ruta Sepetys
- Audio read by: Edoardo Ballerini and Ruta Sepetys
- Genre: Young adult; Historical fiction
- Publisher: Philomel Books
- Publication date: February 1, 2022
- ISBN: 978-1-984836-03-8

I Must Betray You is a historical fiction novel written by Lithuanian-American author Ruta Sepetys, published by Philomel Books on February 1, 2022. The novel follows Cristian Florescu, a 17-year-old boy living in Romania during Nicolae Ceaușescu's final year of dictatorship in 1989. Over the months of October, November, and December, the novel reveals the country's rising tensions between the Romanian people and their surveillance-heavy government leading up to the Romanian revolution.

== Summary ==
During Nicolae Ceaușescu's final year dictating Romania in 1989, the book follows Cristian Florescu, a 17-year-old high school student who is coerced by the Securitate into becoming an informer. As such, he is tasked with providing intelligence on those around him, including the family of an American diplomat. As the story continues, it documents Cristian's attempts to navigate this forced role while secretly resisting the regime. He records observations and truths in a notebook, creating a document of the events occurring in his country. As the Romanian Revolution unfolds in December 1989, Cristian becomes directly involved in the uprising. The novel portrays the period leading up to the end of Ceaușescu's rule and its aftermath, including the exposure of widespread state-sanctioned betrayals.

== Reception ==
=== Reviews ===
I Must Betray You was well received by critics, including starred reviews from Booklist, Kirkus Reviews, Publishers Weekly, and School Library Journal. While noting the novel's heavy themes, Common Sense Media rated it five out of five stars.

Kirkus referred to the novel as "compulsively readable and brilliant". Multiple reviewers discussing the novel's pacing and suspense, with BookPage's Mariel Fechik calling it "a master class in pacing and atmosphere". Booklist's Angela Cartenson highlighted how the novel's "suspenseful twists continue to the very end".

Reviewers also noted the research Sepetys conducted for the novel, with New York Times reviewer MJ Franklin writing, "Sepetys expertly blends historical details into the story [...], creating a tale that is as educational as it is thrilling." Cartenson pointed to the novel's back matter, which includes "archival photographs, an author’s note, an extensive source list, and a description of the research process and several in-person interviews".

The audiobook, narrated by Edoardo Ballerini and Ruta Sepetys, also received a starred review from Booklist, with Terry Hong calling Ballerini a "rare talent who instantly, effortlessly transports listeners into a story". Hong highlighted how Ballerini "expertly performs characters’ specific details, empathically channels emotions, and deftly reveals a narrative". AudioFile simply noted how "Ballerini's pacing enhances the suspense and twists in this first-person narrative".

=== Awards and honors ===
I Must Betray You was a New York Times Best Seller. In 2022, Booklist included the novel on their year-end list of the "Top 10 Historical Fiction for Youth". Bank Street College of Education, Kirkus Reviews, NPR, Publishers Weekly, and School Library Journal included it among their list of the best books of 2022. The following year, Young Adult Library Services Association included the title on their top 10 list of the Best Fiction for Young Adults, and the Association for Library Service to Children included it on their list of Notable Children's Books.

The audiobook was also listed among School Library Journal's list of the "Top 10 Audiobooks of 2022".

Awards for I Must Betray You
Year	Award	Result	Ref.
2022	Cybils Award for Young Adult Fiction	Finalist	
2022	Goodreads Choice Award for Readers' Favorite Young Adult Fiction	Nominee	
2023	Heavy Medal Award	Finalist	
2023	Josette Frank Award	Winner	
