= Karen Lynn Williams =

American writer of children's literature

Karen Lynn Williams is an American writer of children's literature. She is best known for her books about the difficulties of children in developing countries.

== Background ==
Williams was born in 1952 in New Haven, Connecticut. She was graduated from the University of Connecticut (B.S., 1974) and Southern Connecticut State University (M.S., 1977). She was a teacher of the deaf in Connecticut from 1977 to 1980 and a Peace Corps teacher of English in Malawi from 1980 to 1983. From 1990 to 1993 she lived and worked in Deschapelles, Haiti, where her husband, Steven Williams, was a doctor at the Hôpital Albert Schweitzer.

Williams teaches literature and writing in the Chatham University Master of Fine Arts Program in Children's and Adolescent Writing.

== Books ==
- Galimoto, fiction (New York: Lothrop, 1990).
- Baseball and Butterflies, fiction (New York: Lothrop, 1990).
- When Africa Was Home, fiction (New York: Orchard Book, 1991).
- First Grade King, fiction (New York: Clarion Books, 1992).
- Applebaum's Garage, fiction (New York: Clarion Books, 1993).
- Tap-Tap, fiction (New York: Clarion Books, 1994).
- A Real Christmas This Year, fiction (New York: Clarion Books, 1995).
- Painted Dreams, fiction (New York: Lothrop, Lee, & Shepard Books, 1998).
- One Thing I'm Good at, fiction (New York: Lothrop, Lee, & Shepard Books, 1999).
- Circles of Hope, fiction (Grand Rapids: Eerdmans Books for Young Readers, 2005).
- Four Feet, Two Sandals, fiction (Grand Rapids: Eerdmans Books for Young Readers, 2007).

== Sources ==
Contemporary Authors Online. The Gale Group, 2002. PEN (Permanent Entry Number): 0000106578.
