= Kirby Larson =

American novelist

- Born: August 17, 1954 (age 71); Seattle, Washington, U.S.
- Education: Western Washington University (BA); University of Washington (MA)
- Occupation: Writer of children's books
- Notable work: Hattie Big Sky
- Spouse: Neil Edwin Larson (m. 1975)
- Children: 2

Kirby Lane Larson (born August 17, 1954, in Seattle) is an American writer of children's books including Oppenheim Toy Portfolio Platinum Award-winner The Magic Kerchief, illustrated by Rosanne Litzinger. Her book, Hattie Big Sky, was a finalist for the 2007 Scandiuzzi Book Award of the Washington State Book Awards, and won a 2007 Newbery Honor. Kirby is retired from the faculty at the Whidbey Writers Workshop MFA program. Two Bobbies: A True Story of Hurricane Katrina, Friendship, and Survival and Nubs: The True Story of a Mutt, a Marine & a Miracle both have won a Show-Me Award.

== Biography ==
Larson was born August 17, 1954, in Seattle to David Neil and Donna Marie Miltenberger.

On September 6, 1975, Larson married Neil Edwin Larson, with whom she has two children, Tyler Kenton and Quinn Lois.

Larson earned a Bachelor of Arts from Western Washington University in 1976 and a Master of Arts from the University of Washington in 1980.

== Awards and honors ==
Awards for Larson's writing
| Year | Title | Award | Result | Ref. |
|---|---|---|---|---|
| 2007 | Hattie Big Sky | ALA Best Books for Young Adults | Selection | |
| 2007 | Hattie Big Sky | Newbery Medal | Honor | |
| 2008 | Two Bobbies | ASPCA Henry Bergh Non-Fiction Companion Animal Children's Book Award | | |
| 2009 | Two Bobbies | Southern Independent Booksellers Alliance Children's Book Award | | |
| 2010 | Nubs | Christopher Award | Winner | |
| 2011 | Two Bobbies | South Carolina Association of School Librarians Picture Book Award | Winner | |
| 2015 | Dash | National Parenting Publications Awards | Gold | |
| 2015 | Dash | Scott O'Dell Award for Historical Fiction | Winner | |
| 2016 | Duke | South Carolina Association of School Librarians Children's Book Award | Winner | |
| 2017 | Audacity Jones to the Rescue | Washington State Book Award Books for Middle Grade Readers | Finalist | |
| | Magic Kerchief | Oppenheim Toy Portfolio Platinum Award | | |

== Bibliography ==
- Second-Grade Pig Pals (1994)
- Cody and Quinn, Sitting in a Tree (1996)
- The Magic Kerchief (2000)
- Hattie Big Sky (2006)
- Two Bobbies: A True Story of Hurricane Katrina, Friendship, and Survival (2008)
- Nubs: The True Story of a Mutt, a Marine & a Miracle (2009)
- The Fences Between Us: The Diary of Piper Davis, Seattle Washington, 1941 (2010)
- The Friendship Doll (2011)
- Bitty Baby at the Ballet (2013)
- Bitty Baby and Me (2013)
- Bitty Baby the Brave (2013)
- Hattie Ever After (2013)
- Princess Bitty Baby (2013)
- Bitty Baby Loves the Snow (2013)
- Duke (2013)
- Bitty Baby Has a Tea Party (2014)
- Bitty Baby Makes a Splash (2014)
- Dash (2014)
- Liberty (2016)
- Audacity Jones to the Rescue (2016)
- Audacity Jones Steals the Show (2017)
- Code Word Courage (2018)
