= Flora's Very Windy Day =

Book by Jeanne Birdsall

- First edition, designed by Matt Phelan
- Author: Jeanne Birdsall
- Illustrator: Matt Phelan
- Cover artist: Phelan
- Language: English
- Genre: Children's literature
- Publisher: Houghton Mifflin Books for Children/Houghton Mifflin Harcourt
- Publication date: 2010
- Publication place: United States
- Media type: Picture book
- ISBN: 0618986766

Flora's Very Windy Day is a children's picture book by Jeanne Birdsall. It is illustrated by Matt Phelan. Published by Houghton Mifflin Books for Children, the two main characters in the book are Flora and her little brother Crispin, both of whom are blown away by the wind.

== Reception ==
A Bulletin of the Center for Children's Books review says: "The illustrations' spare palette relies mainly on the vivid contrast between autumnal rusts and pastel sky blue as the kids float along, and there's a touch of Tricia Tusa about Matt Phelan's kids, with their pale, softly round faces decked with rosy cheeks and touches of squiggle in hair and accessories. Older sibs will understand Flora's blend of impatience and attachment, and they may be tickled by the notion of a command appearance before the wind."

A Kirkus Reviews review says: "Phelan’s illustrations are simply wonderful: His line floats and traces the air currents, his colors are subtle but strong and he captures Flora’s multiple emotions and Crispin's silent toddlerness in every rosy-cheeked image. Emotionally true from cover to cover. "
