= Between Shades of Gray =

2011 young adult novel by Ruta Sepetys

- Author: Ruta Sepetys
- Cover artist: Dave Kopta
- Language: English
- Genre: Historical
- Publisher: Philomel Books
- Publication date: 2011
- Publication place: United States
- Media type: Print (paperback)
- Pages: 338
- ISBN: 978-0-14-133588-9
- OCLC: 701021642
- LC Class: PZ7.S47957 Be 2011

Between Shades of Gray, later also published as Ashes in the Snow, is the debut novel of Lithuanian American novelist Ruta Sepetys and was first published in 2011. It is set during the Stalinist repressions of the mid-20th century and follows the life of a teenage girl Lina as she is deported from her native Lithuania with her mother and younger brother and the journey they take to a Gulag labor camp in Siberia. A New York Times Best Seller, the novel was nominated for the 2012 CILIP Carnegie Medal and has been translated into more than 27 languages. The novel was also adapted into the 2018 film Ashes in the Snow.

== Synopsis ==
Lina Vilkas is a 15-year-old girl and aspiring artist living in Kaunas, Lithuania with her parents and younger brother, Jonas. On the night of June 14, 1941, her home is unexpectedly entered by the NKVD, the secret police of the Soviet Union. She, her mother, and her brother are given only twenty minutes to change clothing and pack their belongings before being arrested and deported along with hundreds of other Lithuanians.

Lina and her family are placed in a dirty cattle car. Among their group of 46 are Mr. Stalas, a sarcastic senior whom she calls the bald man; Ona, a young mother who was taken from a hospital and is accompanied by her sickly newborn girl; and Andrius Arvydas, a rebellious seventeen-year-old whom Lina quickly befriends. She makes contact with her father once, who tells Lina that she can use her art as a means of discreet communication.

Two days after their arrest, the Vilkas family begins a six-week journey to an unknown destination in Siberia. They spend much of their time in the darkness and are only provided one bucket of gray animal feed and water a day. After eight days, Ona's baby dies. Despite everything, the group rejoices at news that Germany has invaded Lithuania. Throughout the trip, Lina draws designs and codes and passes them to nearby cars, hoping to reach her father. Eventually, the train stops and they are taken away to a bathhouse and forced to strip in front of NKVD officers, one of whom gropes Lina. Afterwards, as they're loaded into another truck, a commander grabs Ona, who is chanting and restless. She screams and claws at him and he promptly shoots her.

Lina and her family are forcibly settled on a kolkhoz (collective farm) and forced to work in order to earn meager rations. Lina's mother, after hesitation, becomes an English teacher for the farm's leaders in order to support her family. As Lina settles in to her new life, she strengthens her relationship with Andrius. The refugees dig and farm, and are periodically taken to the central office where the NKVD attempt to coerce them to sign a document declaring themselves to be criminals. One man from Lina's car, Aleksandras Lukas, identifies himself as a lawyer and leads the group in a quiet, dignified refusal.

Over time, Lina becomes suspicious of Andrius and his access to food and cigarettes. She accuses him and his mother of working with the NKVD. He informs her that his mother had been forced to prostitute herself to protect him. Some months later, Jonas develops scurvy due to malnutrition. Andrius brings him tomatoes, and he and Lina rebuild their relationship as Jonas recovers.

Some time in the spring, the Vilkases are moved to a different work camp above the Arctic Circle to construct barracks. The conditions are dire and they are forced to build their own shelter to survive. They are not fed nearly enough, and as winter approaches, Jonas's scurvy returns. The NKVD claims that Lina's father has died, devastating the family. After giving up her rations to Jonas, Lina's mother becomes sick. Lina begs two NKVD officers to send a doctor, but they refuse, and her mother soon dies. As Jonas's condition worsens, a Soviet doctor and inspection officer arrives at the camp. He coordinates the delivery of food for the deportees and raw fish to treat Jonas.

In the epilogue, which is set in 1995, construction workers in Kaunas dig up a jar of papers which reveal that Lina and Jonas were held in the camp for ten more years before being released shortly before 1954. Since then, Lina had married Andrius, but was still viewed as a criminal by the Soviet Union. Unable to speak openly about her experiences, she instead buried a time capsule in her old home.

== Characters ==
- Lina Vilkas: The story's 15-year-old protagonist, taken in the beginning with her mother and brother to a labour camp. She's a brave and determined girl, described as very similar to her mother.
- Jonas Vilkas: Lina's 10-year-old brother. He is a major character, beloved by all, including the sour Mr. Stalas. His sweet and innocent personality is evident throughout the book, although Lina is frightened by the emotional changes he experiences over the course of their ordeal.
- Elena Vilkas: Lina and Jonas' mother. She is generous to the other deportees, and frequently gives away food and valuables. She also teaches her children that it is important to do what is right, not what is easy. She was described as a beautiful woman, with blond hair and blue eyes.
- Kostas Vilkas: Lina and Jonas' father, who is separated from his family and shipped to a prison called Krasnoyarsk. Nikolai Kretzsky and Ivanov claimed Kostas was dead, but whether or not they are telling the truth is unknown. Much of the book revolves around Lina's desperate attempts to locate and contact her father. In Salt to the Sea, it is revealed that he was indeed tortured and killed in a Soviet gulag.
- Andrius Arvydas: A handsome 17-year-old boy, whom Lina and her family meet on the train to the labour camps. He falls in love with Lina in exile, often sneaks food and supplies to the Vilkas family, and saves them a number of times with his knowledge of the happenings of the NKVD. He and Lina are said to be married in the epilogue.
- Mrs. Arvydas: Andrius' beautiful and dainty mother. She becomes a prostitute for the NKVD after they threaten to kill her son if she did not do so.
- Nikolai Kretzsky: A young NKVD officer. While Lina finds him cruel and ruthless throughout much of the novel, he seems to struggle with his work due to its immorality. While he is described to hit and shove the prisoners, he is also the only member of the NKVD who turns as the women undress for their bath, saves Elena from his fellow officers when they assault her, and is implied to send for a doctor to come to camp. He dies of suicide by the end of the novel.
- Mr. Stalas: An cynical elderly man, distraught with guilt. He allegedly despises everyone, often suggesting they kill themselves before the NKVD does. It is later discovered that he had revealed the prisoners' identities and workplaces, resulting in their imprisonment. He has a soft spot for the Vilkas family, despite being reluctant to show it, and he later helps in saving the sick prisoners.
- Janina: A young girl partial to Lina, whose doll she lost when an officer shot its head off.
- Joana: Lina's beloved 17-year-old cousin and best friend, who flees to Germany with her family with Kostas' help before Stalin begins the deportations due to her father's anti-Soviet activities. Their escape is the reason for the Vilkas family's imprisonment. Joana is consistently mentioned but only appears in flashbacks. She is one of the main characters in Sepetys' third novel, Salt to the Sea (2016).
- Ivanov: An NKVD officer, perhaps the most despicable, who allows many prisoners to die, and finds great humour in the pain.
- Ona: A young woman, not believed to be 20, who is forced on the train immediately after giving birth to her baby. Neither she nor her baby are given any medical attention. After losing her baby, Ona goes insane and is fatally shot by the NKVD.
- Aleksandras Lukas: A gray-haired man who is obsessed with winding his watch. He is an attorney from Kaunas. He shows intelligence and dignity throughout the novel, especially when the deportees were asked to sign papers condemning them to imprisonment.

== Background ==
Between Shades of Gray is partly based upon the stories Sepetys heard from survivors of Soviet repressions in the Baltic states during a visit to her relatives in Lithuania. Sepetys decided she needed to write a fiction novel rather than a non-fiction volume as a way of making it easier for survivors to talk to her. She interviewed dozens of people during her stay.

Between Shades of Gray was originally intended as a young adult novel, but there have been several adult publications. In an interview with ThirstforFiction, Ruta Sepetys said that the reason she intended Between Shades of Gray to be a young adult novel was because she met many survivors in Lithuania who were themselves, teenagers, during the deportations and had a greater will to live than many of their adult counterparts at the time.

== Reception ==
Between Shades of Gray received intensely positive reviews. Linda Sue Park of The New York Times described it as a "superlative first novel" whilst Susan Carpenter of the LA Times called it a "story of hardship as well as human triumph". Publishers Weekly praised Between Shades of Gray, calling it a "harrowing page-turner, made all the more so for its basis in historical fact".

The book was a finalist for 2012 William C. Morris Award for a debut young adult novel and for the 2012 Amelia Elizabeth Walden Award. It was shortlisted for 2012 Carnegie Medal and won the 2012 Golden K-Word Award (a variation of the Golden Kite Award.) It received an Outstanding Merit recognition as a 2012 Best Children's Book of the Year from the Children's Committee of Bank Street College of Education. Sigma University recognized as 2023’s Sigma Book of the Year; the graphic novel version was on the 2022 list.

== Recognition ==
=== National awards ===
- A New York Times Bestseller
- An International Bestseller
- A Carnegie Medal winner
- A William C. Morris Finalist
- A New York Times Notable Book
- A Wall Street Journal Best Children's Book
- Winner of The Golden Kite Award for Fiction
- An ALA Notable Book
- A Publishers Weekly Best Children's Book of 2011
- YALSA's Top 10 Best Fiction For Young Adults
- A School Library Journal Best Book of 2011
- A Booklist Best Book of 2011
- A Kirkus Best Book of 2011
- iTunes Best Teen Novel of 2011
- A Junior Library Guild Selection
- Notable Books For a Global Society Award
- An Indies Choice Book Awards Finalist
- IRA Children's and Young Adult's Book Award
- Amazon Top Ten Teen Books of 2011
- A CYBILS Finalist for 2011
- A Sigma University 2011 Historical Fiction of the Year
- National Blue Ribbon Selection by Book of the Month Club
- A St. Louis Post Dispatch Best Book of 2011
- A Columbus Dispatch Best Book of 2011
- Winner of the SCBWI Work-in-Progress Grant
- Georgia Peach Honor Book (GA)

=== International awards ===
- Finalist for the Carnegie Medal in the UK
- Shortlisted for the Lewisham Book Award in the UK
- A Waterstones Children's Book Prize Nominee in the UK
- Amazon UK Top Ten Books of 2011
- Finalist for Le Prix des Incorruptibles in France
- Winner of the Prix RTL Lire For Best Novel For Young People in France
- Winner of the Prix Livrentête in France
- Finalist for the Historia Prize in France
- Winner of the Peter Pan Silver Star in Sweden
- Winner of the Prix Farniente in Belgium
- Winner of the Flanders Young Adult Literature Jury Prize in Belgium
- Winner of the KJV-Award in Belgium
- Winner of the National Patriot Award in Lithuania
- Winner of the Global Lithuanian Leader Award in Lithuania
- A Golden List Nominee in the Netherlands
- A Magazyn Literacki KSIĄŻKI! Best Book in Poland
- Winner of the Prix des Libraries du Québec in Canada
- 'Der Leserpreis' Readers Choice Finalist in Germany
- A 'Best Breakthrough Author' Nominee for the Penguin Teen Australia Awards
- Finalist for the Sakura Medal in Japan

=== State awards ===
- Texas Lonestar Reading List Master List (TX)
- TAYSHAS Reading List Master List (TX)
- Capitol Choices Noteworthy Books for Children and Teens Master List (D.C.)
- Black-Eyed Susan Book Award Master List (MD)
- Pennsylvania School Librarians Association Award Master List (PA)
- The Flume: New Hampshire Readers' Choice Award Master List (NH)
- Iowa Association of School Librarians Award Master List (IA)
- Kentucky Bluegrass Award Master List (KY)
- Nevada Young Readers Award Master List (NV)
- Rhode Island Teen Book Award Master List (RI)
- Maud Hart Lovelace Award (MN)
- Missouri Association of School Librarians Gateway Award Master List (MO)
- South Carolina Young Adult Book Award Master List (SC)
- Virginia Readers' Choice Master List (VA)
- Eliot Rosewater Rosie Award Master List (IN)
- Nebraska Golden Sower Award (NE)
- Volunteer State Book Award (TN)
- Young Hoosier Book Award (IN)
- Sequoyah Book Award (OK)

== Translations ==
- Czech: "V šedých tónech," CooBoo, Albatros Media A.S.
- Chinese: "Between Shades of Gray", ChinaCITIC Press, ISBN 978-7-5086-3344-2
- Complex Chinese: "Between Shades of Gray", ISBN 978-957-10-4896-3
- Croatian: "Pomrčina srca", Znanje, ISBN 978-953-324-532-4
- Dutch: "Schaduwliefde," Moon, 2011 ISBN 978-90-488-0901-1
- English (Australian Edition): "Between Shades of Gray" Penguin, ISBN 978-0-14-320541-8
- English (UK Young Adult Edition): "Between Shades of Gray" Puffin, ISBN 978-0-14-133588-9
- English (UK Adult Edition): "Between Shades of Gray" Viking, ISBN 978-0-670-92085-3
- Estonian: "Hallaaegade algus", Tammerraamat, ISBN 978-9949-526-18-5
- Finnish: "Harmaata valoa", Wsoy, ISBN 978-951-0-37239-5
- French: Ce qu'ils n'ont pas pu nous prendre, Gallimard Jeunesse, ISBN 978-2-07-063567-2
- German: Und in mir der unbesiegbare Sommer, Carlsen Verlag, Hamburg, ISBN 978-3-551-58254-6
- Greek: "Between Shades of Gray", Psichogios, ISBN 978-960-496-478-9
- Hebrew: "Between Shades of Gray", Miskal, ISBN 978-965-545-605-9
- Hungarian: "Arnyalatnyi remeny", Maxim Konyvkiado, ISBN 978-963-261-204-1
- Italian: Avevano spento anche la luna, Garzanti Libri, ISBN 978-88-11-67036-0
- Japanese: "Between Shades of Gray", Iwanami Shoten, ISBN 978-4-00-115651-5
- Latvian: "Starp pelēkiem toņiem", Zvaigzne ABC, ISBN 978-9934-0-2238-8
- Lithuanian: "Tarp pilkų debesų", Alma Littera, ISBN 978-9955-38-964-4
- Macedonian "Крадци и проститутки," Sakam Knigi
- Persian: "Between Shades of Gray", Morvarid
- Polish: "szare sniegi syberii", Nasza Ksiegarnia, ISBN 978-83-10-11983-4
- Portuguese (Brazil): "a vida em tons de cinza", Arqueiro, ISBN 978-85-8041-016-7
- Portuguese (Portugal): "o longo inverno", Bertrand Editora/Contraponto, ISBN 978-989-666-085-7
- Romanian "Printre Tonuri Cenusii," Epica Publishing House
- Serbian: "Putovanje pod zvezdama", Alnari, ISBN 978-86-7710-729-1
- Slovak: "Medzi odtieňmi sivej" Ikar, ISBN 978-80-551-2442-1
- Spanish: Entre tonos de gris, Ediciones Maeva, 2011 ISBN 978-84-15120-25-4
- Swedish: "Strimmor av hopp", B/Wahlstroms, ISBN 978-91-32-15958-9
- Turkish: "Gri Gölgeler Arasında" Delidolu, ISBN 978-605-63326-7-8
- Ukrainian: "Поміж сірих сутінків" Klub simejnoho Dozvillia, ISBN 978-617-12-1888-8
