= Furia (novel) =

2020 novel by Yamile Saied Mendez

- First edition
- Author: Yamile Saied Mendez
- Language: English
- Genre: Young Adult Fiction
- Set in: Rosario, Argentina
- Publisher: Algonquin Young Readers
- Publication date: September 15, 2020
- Publication place: United States
- Media type: Print
- Pages: 368
- Awards: Pura Belpré Award
- ISBN: 1-616-20991-7
- Website: https://yamilesmendez.com/book/furia

Furia is a young adult fiction novel written by Yamile Saied Mendez. The main character, Camila, is a 17 year old living in modern-day Rosario, Santa Fe in Argentina. She aspires to be a great soccer star, but her home and love life gets in the way.

Furia received the Pura Belpré Award medal for Young Adult Narrative in 2021.

== Plot ==
The novel begins with Camila Hassan leaving her home to secretly play in a soccer match (referred to as fútbol). Camila's sports activities become increasingly difficult to keep secret as her fame grows and her lover arrives back in town. Throughout the novel, Camilia struggles with injuries, sexism and familial conflicts.

== Characters ==
- Camila Hassan (main character): nicknamed La Furia, meaning "The Fury."
- Roxana: Camila's closest friend, who plays fútbol on the same team Camila does.
- Pablo Hassan: Camila's brother, a skilled fútbol player in a national league.
- Diego Ferrari: Camila's lover, a major league fútbol player from the same barrio as Camila.
- Camila's parents: referred to as Mami and Papa. Their actual names are Isabel and Andres. Camila has a close, albeit rocky, relationship with her mother and a bad relationship with her father.

== Release ==
Furia was published in hardback and ebook formats on September 15, 2020 through Algonquin Young Readers. An audiobook adaptation narrated by Sol Madariaga was released simultaneously through Workman Audio. A paperback edition was released through Algonquin Young Readers on February 15, 2022.

== Themes ==
Furia contains themes about coming of age and intersectional feminist outlooks, while also highlighting Argentinian culture.

== Reception ==
The Chicago Review of Books reviewed Furia, praising the character of Camila and the romance between her and Diego as "genuine and emotionally earned". Common Sense Media gave the work 5 out of 5 stars, highlighting it as having positive role models and messages.

=== Awards ===
- Pura Belpré Award medal for Young Adult Narrative (2021, won)
- Américas Award for Children's and Young Adult Literature, honor book (2021)
