= Out of the Easy =

Young adult novel by Ruta Sepetys

- First edition (US)
- Author: Ruta Sepetys
- Language: English
- Genre: Historical fiction
- Publisher: Philomel Books
- Publication date: 2013
- Publication place: United States
- Media type: Print
- Pages: 346
- ISBN: 039925692X

Out of the Easy is a 2013 novel by Ruta Sepetys. It is her second published novel and was listed as a 2014 Best Children's Book of the Year from the Children's Book Committee of Bank Street College of Education.

It features Josie Moraine, a young woman in the 1950s French Quarter of New Orleans who struggles to escape her family and become the author of her own destiny. The novel became a New York Times bestseller and was listed as an Editor's Choice in the New York Times on February 15, 2013.

Sepetys has said that Out of the Easy was born from her discovery of the biography The Last Madam: A Life in the New Orleans Underworld and her interest in post-war America, which, contrary to her expectations, was full of "suffering and secrets." She also attributes her interest in New Orleans to a gift of vintage opera glasses with an engraved name, enabling her to find out who the original owner was. As with all her books, Sepetys undertook several research trips, which led her to discover news articles about "tourists who met an untimely end"; she later worked this into the novel.
