= Ruta Sepetys =

Lithuanian-American writer (born 1967)

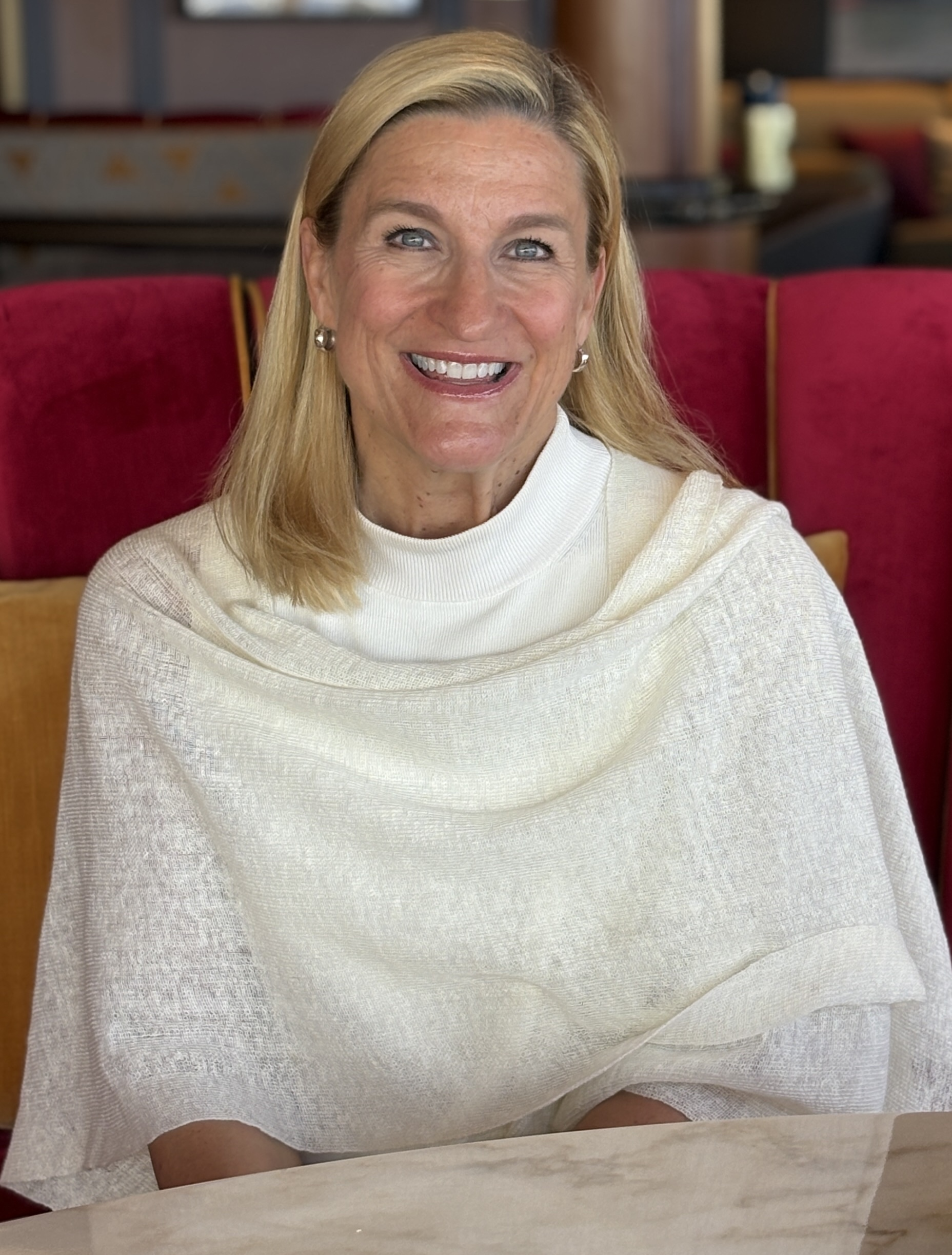
- Sepetys in 2026
- Born: Ruta Sepetys; November 19, 1967 (age 59); Detroit, Michigan, U.S.
- Education: Hillsdale College
- Occupation: Writer
- Spouse: Michael Smith (m. 2006)
- Writing career
- Notable works: Between Shades of Gray; I Must Betray You; Salt to the Sea; Fountains of Silence
- Website: rutasepetys.com

Ruta Sepetys (Lithuanian: Rūta Šepetys; born November 19, 1967) is a Lithuanian-American writer of historical fiction. She is a #1 New York Times bestseller and international bestseller, winner of the Carnegie Medal, and has been honored by the American Academy of Arts and Letters.

She has been awarded fellowships from the Bodleian Libraries at Oxford and the Rockefeller Foundation, and was the first American writer of young adult literature to speak at the European Parliament and NATO. Her work has been published in over sixty countries and forty languages.

== Early life ==
Sepetys was born on 19 November, 1967, in Detroit, Michigan, to Phyllis and George (Jurgis) Sepetys. George was born in Lithuania, but was forced to flee the country when he was 4 years old in 1940 with his family when the country was annexed into the Soviet Union. They initially travelled to German-occupied Poland and spent the next nine years in refugee camps in Germany and Austria. In 1949, they were able to immigrate to the United States. Ruta's grandfather, Jonas, was an engineer and was able to find employment as the family settled in Detroit. Some family members who remained in Lithuania were subjected to deportations to Siberia under Joseph Stalin. Sepetys has two siblings named Kristina and John, and grew up in Detroit's northwestern suburbs.

When she was 8 years old, Sepetys handwrote her first book, The Adventures of Betsy, which followed a girl in third grade befriending a 35-year-old man who drank and smoke whilst living in a van. The story was negatively received by one of her classmates' mother, leading to the school banning Sepetys from further sharing it. However, her interest in literature was not fully suppressed as she soon became inspired by the writings of Roald Dahl. Also as a child, through listening to the radio, she discovered that songs were a form of storytelling which inspired her love of music.

Sepetys opted to attend Hillsdale College due to a small vocal scholarship offered. While there she earned a B.S. in international finance and French. While in college she spent a year overseas and studied at the Centre d’études Européennes in Toulon, and at the ICN Business School in Nancy, France.

== Career ==
Following graduation, she moved to Los Angeles. In 1994, she launched Sepetys Entertainment Group, an entertainment management firm representing songwriters and recording artists.

In 2002, Sepetys was featured in Rolling Stone magazine's "Women in Rock" special issue. She served on the board of advisors for the Mike Curb College of Entertainment and Music Business at Belmont University.

Sepetys published her first novel in 2011. Her novels include Between Shades of Gray (2011), Out of the Easy (2013), Salt to the Sea (2016), The Fountains of Silence (2019), I Must Betray You (2023), and The Bletchley Riddle (2024).

=== Between Shades of Gray ===
Her first novel, Between Shades of Gray, about a teenage girl deported from Lithuania to Siberian gulags after the Soviet occupation in 1941, was critically acclaimed and translated into over 30 languages.

In March 2013, Sepetys became the first American author of young adult literature to give a presentation at European Parliament. The novel was adapted into a film, Ashes in the Snow.

=== Out of the Easy ===
Out of the Easy is Sepetys' second published novel. It was released on February 12, 2013 and centers Josie Moraine, a young woman in the 1950s French Quarter of New Orleans who struggles to escape her family. The story explores themes of feminism in post-war America. The novel became a New York Times bestseller and was a New York Times Editor's Choice on February 15, 2013.

=== Salt to the Sea ===
Salt to the Sea was published on February 2, 2016, and chronicles the 1945 evacuation of East Prussia and the MV Wilhelm Gustloff disaster. It includes a character from Between Shades of Gray, serving as a spin-off.

In their starred review, Publishers Weekly said: "Sepetys delivers another knockout historical novel [...] she excels in shining light on lost chapters of history and this visceral novel proves a memorable testament to strength and resilience in the face of war and cruelty." The New York Times in their review wrote: "Ruta Sepetys acts as champion of the interstitial people so often ignored—whole populations lost in the cracks of history." In June, 2017, Salt to the Sea was awarded the Carnegie Medal for Writing.

=== The Fountains of Silence ===
Sepetys' novel The Fountains of Silence was released on October 1, 2019. It is set in Madrid during the dictatorship of Francisco Franco.

One of the topics covered in the book is the lost children of Francoism, who were children abducted from Spanish Republican parents and given to families who supported the dictatorship. In their starred review, Kirkus wrote: "A stunning novel that exposes modern fascism and elevates human resilience."

=== I Must Betray You ===
I Must Betray You, published in 2022, follows seventeen-year-old Cristian Florescu in 1989 Romania under Nicolae Ceaușescu, who is blackmailed into becoming a government informant. The book was shortlisted for the Carnegie Medal for Writing in 2023.

== Adaptations ==
Between Shades of Gray was adapted for film by Ben York Jones and directed by Marius A. Markevičius; it was produced by Chris Coen, Žilvinas Naujokas, Markevičius and Sepetys. The film is titled Ashes in the Snow and stars Bel Powley, Martin Wallström and Lisa Loven Kongsli. It was released in Lithuania in October 2018 and in the US in early 2019.

In 2017, Salt to the Sea was optioned by Universal Pictures for film, to be produced by Lorenzo di Bonaventura and written by Scott Neustadter and Michael H. Weber.

== Personal life ==
Sepetys married Michael Smith in 2006. She lives in Nashville, Tennessee.

== Recognition ==
On June 6, 2013, Sepetys was awarded the Knight's Cross of the Order of the Cross of Vytis for her efforts to share the history of totalitarianism in the Baltics.

In 2015, Sepetys was awarded the month-long Rockefeller Foundation's Bellagio Center residency in Lake Como, Italy.

On June 19, 2017, Ruta Sepetys was awarded the Carnegie Medal in a ceremony at the Royal Institute of British Architects in London.

In June 2018, to celebrate the 100th anniversary of the Lithuanian Independence Act, Sepetys was included in a commemorative set of postage stamps paying tribute to people whose work strengthened awareness of Lithuania.

She won the 2023 Josette Frank Award from the Bank Street College of Education for I Must Betray You.

On March 6, 2025, Sepetys received the American Academy of Arts and Letters' E.B. White Award for contributions to children's literature.

In 2025, Sepetys was also awarded a research fellowship with the Bodleian Libraries at the University of Oxford for her study of Shiela Grant Duff and Czech historical identity and resistance.

The same year, Sepetys was awarded the Regina Medal by the Catholic Library Association for continued contributions to children’s literature.

== Works ==
=== Books ===
- Between Shades of Gray (2011) ISBN 978-0-399-25412-3
- Out of the Easy (2013) ISBN 978-0-399-25692-9
- Salt to the Sea (2016) ISBN 978-0399160301
- Fountains of Silence (2019) ISBN 978-0399160318
- I Must Betray You (2022) ISBN 978-1-9848-3604-5
- The Bletchley Riddle (2024) ISBN 978-0593527542, co-written with Steve Sheinkin
- A Fortune of Sand (2026) ISBN 979-8-217-09324-3

=== Selected articles ===
- "In Wordless Imagery, An Immigrant's Timeless Tale". All Things Considered. NPR. September 23, 2011.
- "My Family's Story". Huffington Post. November 26, 2012.
- "Two Gray Titles, One Sexy Mix-Up". All Things Considered. NPR. May 17, 2012.
