= Gabi Swiatkowska =

Polish-American artist, musician, and children's author and illustrator

- Born: 1970 (age 55–56); Tychy, Poland
- Education: Cooper Union School of Art
- Occupations: Illustrator, musician
- Writing career
- Period: 2001–present
- Genre: Children's picture books
- Notable works: Infinity and Me, My Name is Yoon
- Notable awards: American Library Association Notable Children's Books; 2013 and 2004

Gabi Swiatkowska (born 1970) is a Polish-born American artist, musician, and children's author and illustrator. She has shown up twice on the ALA Notable Book Award list. One of the books that she illustrated, My Name Is Yoon, won the Ezra Jack Keats Award and is on the New York Public Library's list of 100 Great Children's Books

== Life and career ==
Swiatkowska was born in Tychy, Poland. At fourteen she entered the Lyceum of Art in Bielsko-Biała, and at sixteen she immigrated to New York City, where she attended Cooper Union School of Art. She is the illustrator of fifteen children's books, including A Not Scary Story About Big Scary Things by the poet C. K. Williams, and the author and illustrator of one, Queen on Wednesday. The book she illustrated Infinity and Me was a 2013 ALA Notable Children's Book, and was named a New York Times Best Illustrated Children's Book of 2012.

Swiatkowska lives in the south of France. She frequently exhibits her paintings and sculptures throughout France, and she was also singer, songwriter and upright bass player in the acoustic string band quartet Tildon Krautz.

== Awards ==
Awards for Infinity and Me by Kate Hosford, illustrated by Swiatkowska

- 2013 American Library Association Notable Children's Books
- 2013 Bank Street Best Children's Book of the Year
- 2012 New York Times Best Illustrated Children's Book of 2012
- 2012 Caldecott Medal Nominee
- 2012 Junior Library Guild Selection

Awards for My Name is Yoon by Helen Recorvitz, illustrated by Swiatkowska

- 2008 Bank Street Best Children's Book of the Year
- 2004 Ezra Jack Keats New Illustrator Award
- 2004 IRA Notable Books for a Global Society
- 2004 American Library Association Notable Children's Books
- 2003 Child Magazine Best Books of the Year
- 2003 Nick Jr. Family Magazine Best Books of the Year
- 2003 School Library Journal Best Book of the Year

Other awards

- 2008 The Book Award for Best Children's Literature on Aging for Elementary Readers
- 2007 Booklist Editors' Choice
- 2007 National Association Parenting Publications Gold Award
- 2007 Show Me Readers Award winner chosen by the children of Missouri.
- 2007 Young Hoosier Book Award winner in the Picture Book category
- 2007 Nevada Young Reader Award for the Picture Book Category
- 2006 Washington Children's Choice Picture Book Award
- 2005 Zena Sutherland Award for Best Text, Illustration and Overall Picture Book
- 2005 School Library Journal Best Book of the Year
- 2005 Outstanding Science Trade Book for students K-12
- 2005 Cooperative Children's Center Choices Award University of Wisconsin-Madison
- 2005 Bank Street Best Children's Book of the Year
- 2003 Chicago Public Library Children's Books recommended list- Best of the Best
- 2003 New York is Book Country Festival- Bookmark Choice Book
- 2003 USA Today – favorite books for children and young adults
- 2002 Oppenheim Portfolio best book award, and toy portfolio
- 2001 Smithsonian Magazine Notable Book

== Published books ==
Books Written and Illustrated

- Queen on Wednesday (Farrar, Straus and Giroux, 2014)

Books Illustrated

- Mary Cassatt: Extraordinary Impressionist Painter (Henry Holt & Co., 2015)
- Please, Papa by Kate Banks (Farrar, Straus and Giroux, 2013)
- Thank You, Mama by Kate Banks (Farrar, Straus and Giroux, 2013)
- Infinity and Me by Kate Hosford (Carolrhoda Books, 2012)
- This Baby by Kate Banks (Farrar, Straus and Giroux, 2013)
- A Not Scary Story About Big Scary Things by C.K. Williams (Houghton Mifflin Harcourt, 2010)
- The Earth Shook by Donna Jo Napoli (Disney-Hyperion, 2009)
- Yoon and the Jade Bracelet by Helen Recorvitz (Farrar, Straus and Giroux, 2008)
- The Golden Rule by Ilene Cooper (Harry N. Abrams Books, 2007)
- Waiting for Gregory by Kimberly Willis Holt (Henry Holt & Co., 2006)
- Yoon and the Christmas Mitten by Helen Recorvitz (Farrar, Straus and Giroux, 2006)
- Summertime Waltz by Nina Payne (Farrar, Straus and Giroux, 2005)
- Arrowhawk by Lola M. Schaefer (Henry Holt & Co., 2004)
- My Name is Yoon by Helen Recorvitz (Farrar, Straus and Giroux, 2003)
- Hannah's Bookmobile Christmas by Sally Derby (Henry Holt & Co., 2001)
