= Yamile Saied Méndez =

Argentine author

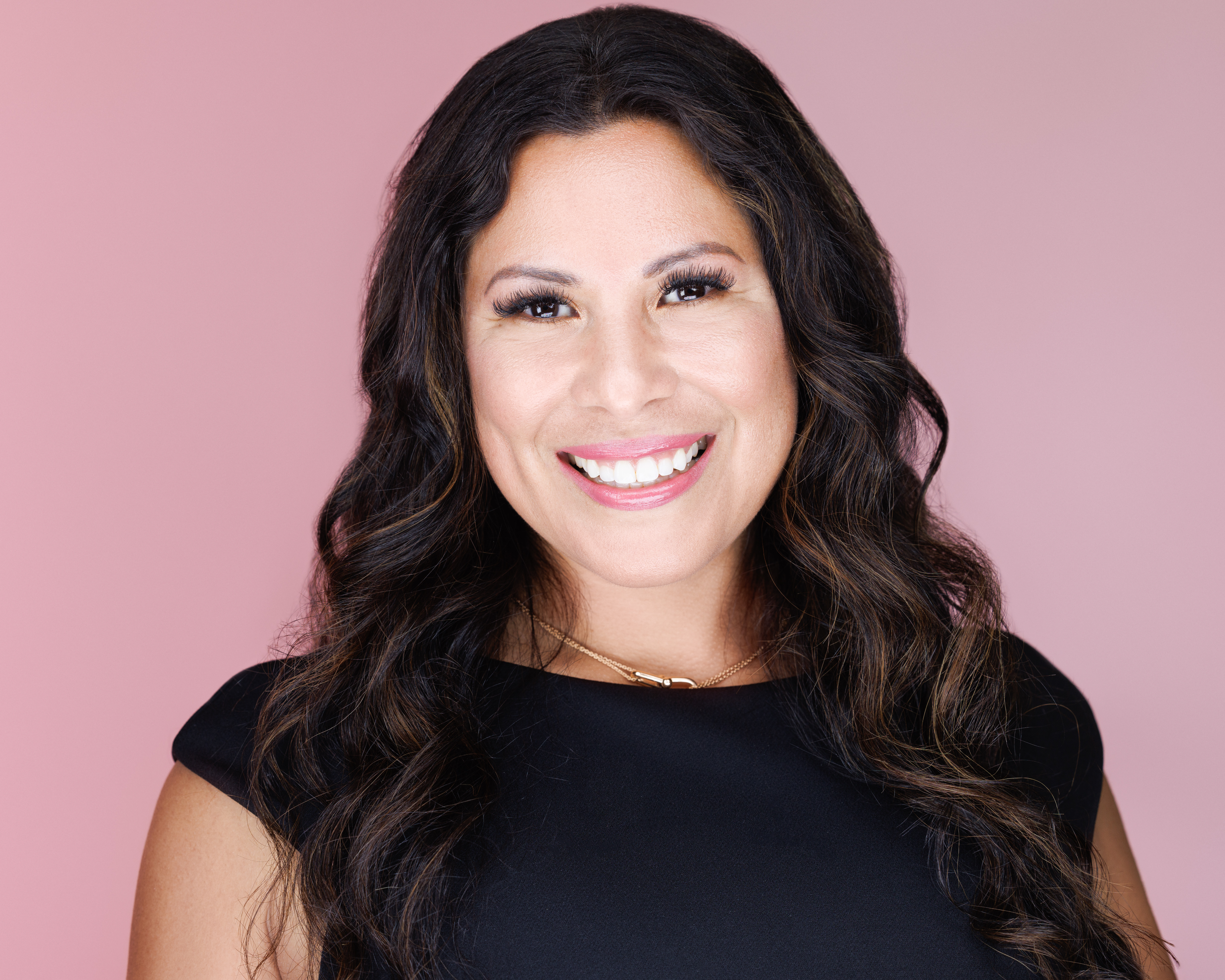
- Born: Rosario, Argentina
- Education: Brigham Young University; Vermont College of Fine Arts (MFA)
- Occupation: Author
- Website: yamilemendez.com

Yamile (pronounced sha-MEE-lay) Saied Méndez is an Argentine American author of picture books, children's books, young adult books, and adult romance. She is a Pura Belpré gold medal winner for her young adult novel, Furia. She is a founding member of Las Musas collective.

== Background ==
Méndez was born in Rosario, Argentina. Méndez grew up attached to the culture of one grandfather, who was Syrian Lebanese; her mother was an orphan but knew she was a descendant of indigenous people from Argentina. Her father drove a taxi and her mother worked as a nanny. The first among her extended family members to attend college, she went to Brigham Young University where she studied international economics. Méndez received an MFA from Vermont College of Fine Arts. Méndez lives in Utah with her husband and five children.

== Awards and recognition ==
- Walter Dean Myers grant to write Furia (2015)
- New York Public Library Best Books of 2019 for "¿De Dónde Eres?"
- Kirkus Best Books of 2019
- 2020 Children's and Young Adult Bloggers' Literary Awards (Cybils) for Furia
- Reese's YA Book Club selection for Furia (2020)
- Winner of a Pura Belpré YA Author Medal for Furia (2021)
- The Beautiful Game selected for 2025 Rise Book Project: Top Ten feminist books for young readers

== Articles ==
- The Pen Ten: An Interview with Yamile Saied Méndez
- Yamile Saied Méndez talks FURIA and the Argentina soccer scene
- This Utah author has a new novel — and Reese Witherspoon just chose it for her book club

== Works ==
- Blizzard Besties (2018)
- "Where Are You From?" /"¿De Dónde Eres?" (2019)
- Random Acts of Kittens (2019)
- On These Magic Shores (2020)
- Furia (2020)
- Shaking Up the House (2021)
- What Will You Be? (2021)
- Wish Upon a Stray (2021)
- Can't Be Tamed (2022)
- Friends Like These (2022)
- Where There's Smoke (2022)
- Our Shadows Have Claws (2022)
- Twice a Quinceañera (2022)
- Love of My Lives (2023)
- All Roads Lead to Rome (2025)
