= Salt to the Sea =

2016 novel by Ruta Sepetys

- First edition (US)
- Author: Ruta Sepetys
- Cover artist: Matt Jones
- Language: English
- Genre: Historical fiction
- Publisher: Philomel Books (US); Penguin Books (UK)
- Publication date: 2016
- Publication place: United States
- Media type: Print
- Pages: 391
- ISBN: 9780141347400

Salt to the Sea is a 2016 historical fiction young adult novel by Ruta Sepetys. It tells the story of four individuals in World War II who make their way to the ill-fated MV Wilhelm Gustloff. The story also touches on the disappearance of the Amber Room, a world-famous, ornately decorated chamber stolen by the Nazis that has never been recovered.

Sepetys was awarded the 2017 Carnegie Medal for Salt to the Sea.

== Background ==
Sepetys wanted to write about an element of World War II that had been forgotten. She writes in her Author's Note for the novel that even though the sinking of the Wilhelm Gustloff is the deadliest maritime disaster in history, "remarkably, most people have never heard of it." She continues writing: "Every nation has hidden history, countless stories preserved only by those who experienced them. Stories of war are often read and discussed worldwide by readers whose nations stood on opposite sides during the battle. History divided us, but through reading we can be united in story, study, and remembrance. Books join us together as a global reading community, but more importantly, a global human community striving to learn from the past."

Sepetys is the daughter of a Lithuanian refugee. She told the Chicago Tribune that after she wrote Between Shades of Gray, which was inspired by the history of Lithuania, that her father's cousin told her she should write the story of the "Wilhelm Gustloff." In an interview with NPR, Sepetys also shared that her father's cousin had a ticket to board the Wilhelm Gustoff. However, she was ultimately unable to board the ship. Sepetys' father's cousin wanted the story to be told as a way to give a voice to those who lost their lives on the Ship. Sepetys goes on to say, "And I was fascinated by the story, wondering why it is that some parts of history penetrate our collective consciousness, and others remain hidden?"

She also told the Tribune that she wanted to write the story from the refugees' point of view. She says, "The concept of "refugee" is something frightening, it's something foreign. So I wanted to write from that point of view, which is why I have four alternating main characters, all young people from different nations, seeing life from four different cultural lenses on this refugee trek."

== Plot ==
Salt to the Sea takes place in East Prussia in 1945. The book follows four central characters as they evacuate their home countries: Emilia, a teenage Polish orphan; Florian, a restoration artist from East Prussia; Joana, a Lithuanian nurse; and Alfred, a Nazi.

Emilia and Florian meet when Florian saves Emilia from a Russian soldier. The couple runs into Joana, who is traveling with a group of refugees. Among them are a blind girl named Ingrid, an elderly shoemaker named Heinz (known amongst the group as the "shoe poet" as he is able to tell someone's life story by the shoes they are wearing), a cynical older lady named Eva, and a young boy named Klaus (known amongst the group as the "wandering boy" since they found him wandering near the forest). Everyone is attempting to make it to West Germany to board ships and escape before Russians bomb the area.

Throughout the journey to the evacuation ships, the refugees get to know one another. It is revealed that fifteen-year-old Emilia is eight months pregnant after an assault by Russian soldiers; Florian, the restoration artist, is on the run for stealing a piece of art from the Amber Room; and Joana is secretly a "murderer". By the time the group reaches the evacuation ships, their relationships are solidified. It is clear that Joana and Florian have fallen in love, and Emilia sees Florian as a symbol of good men. As the group tries to cross a frozen harbor to get to the ships, Russians bomb the harbor, killing Ingrid.

When they reach western Germany, the group comes into contact with Alfred, their only hope of getting tickets to the boats. They board the Wilhelm Gustloff, the largest ship in the harbor. Eva boards another boat, the Hansa. Since Hitler hates Poles, and since the ships are all German ships, Emilia poses as a Latvian woman to protect herself.

While on the boat, Emilia gives birth to a daughter, Halinka; Joana works as a nurse; Florian hides from Nazis who are looking for him due to his stolen artifact. Joana confesses to Florian that she's responsible for her cousin's family being arrested and imprisoned by the Soviets, seeing herself as their murderer. Just hours after setting sail, three Russian torpedoes hit the Wilhelm Gustloff. Quickly, the ship sinks, and thousands die. However, Joana, Florian, and Halinka escape on a lifeboat, along with Klaus, after Emilia sacrifices her spot in the lifeboat for him. Heinz drowns as he tries to swim to the lifeboat as he gave his life vest to Florian. As the lifeboat rows away, Florian realizes that Alfred is holding his pack, his most important possession.

Emilia finds Alfred and they escape the sinking ship on a raft. Rather than grieving the dead, all selfish Alfred thinks about is his highly longed-for medal for his service to Germany. While on the raft, Emilia accidentally speaks in Polish, giving herself away. Alfred tries to kill her, but fails and suffers fatal injuries in the process. Emilia soon freezes to death and is reunited with her late mother and brother in the afterlife.

In 1969, Joana and Florian are married and live in the United States. They have adopted Halinka and Klaus and now have a child of their own as well. In a letter sent by Clara Christensen, a Danish woman, it is told that Emilia's body, along with Florian's pack, was found washed up on shore on Bornholm, Denmark, and the Christensens buried Emilia by a grove of roses near their cottage.

== Reception ==
M.T. Anderson of The New York Times praised Sepetys' writing. In reviewing the book, Anderson wrote, "once again, Ruta Sepetys acts as champion of the interstitial people so often ignored — whole populations lost in the cracks of history."

The judges who awarded Sepetys the Carnegie Medal for this book noted "the powerful, crafted language, the tight, carefully shaped plot and the range of moods evoked throughout".

The book was honored as a finalist of the Amelia Elizabeth Walden Award in 2017 and was listed as a 2017 Best Children's Book of the Year with Outstanding Merit from the Children's Book Committee of Bank Street College of Education.

== Characters ==
- Joana Vilkas: A crossover character who is the cousin of Lina Vilkas, the main protagonist in Ruta Sepetys' debut novel, Between Shades of Gray (2011). Joana is a 21-year-old nurse fleeing from her native country Lithuania, who had repatriated to Nazi Germany with her family in 1941 (thanks to her mother's German roots) to escape capture from the Soviet Russian forces. She hopes to reunite with her missing parents and brother after the war. She blames herself for Lina's family being deported and imprisoned in their place because Joana had tried to leave a letter for her cousin before escaping, which her family's cook turned over to the Soviet police instead. She develops a romantic relationship with Florian Beck, whom she calls "the Prussian".
- Florian Beck: A young Prussian art restoration apprentice carrying a valuable amber swan that he stole from the Amber Room, after discovering that he is a puppet of Erich Koch's and in revenge for the Nazis killing his father. He gradually abandons this mission as he bonds with the other refugees. He has a sister named Anni who fled to Denmark and hopes to find her. He develops a romantic relationship with Joana.
- Emilia Stożek: A 15-year-old orphaned Polish girl from Lwów who was raped by Russian soldiers not far from Nemmersdorf, where she was sent by her father after fleeing their village, before his death. She is caught in an illusion that a boy named August, the son of the family she was working for, was the source of her pregnancy. She planned on finding him after the war. However, she eventually reveals her rape was facilitated by August's Nazi mother in order to save his sister from being taken by the soldiers instead. She gives birth to a daughter, Halinka (named after Emilia's mother), whom she saves and hands over to Florian during the sinking before dying and being washed up in Bornholm, Denmark. Halinka grows up to become a swimmer and tells Emilia's story to the papers.
- Alfred Frick: An eager, delusional young German who adheres to Adolf Hitler's propaganda (he quotes Mein Kampf) and is highly narcissistic. His thought processes and secrets are revealed via letters he mentally composes to Hannelore, a half-Jewish girl back in his hometown of Heidelberg. It's later revealed he sold out Hannelore and her father to the Hitler Youth after she rejected him. He dies after a struggle with Emilia.

== Film adaptation ==
On May 25, 2017, Variety reported that Universal Pictures was developing Salt to the Sea into a film. Scott Neustadter and Michael H. Weber have been tapped to adapt the novel into a screenplay. As of November 2026, no updates have been made public regarding the development of the movie.

== Recognition ==
The novel has received numerous awards, including:

=== National Awards ===
- A #1 New York Times Bestseller
- Winner of the Carnegie Medal
- A New York Times Notable Book
- Winner of the Indies Choice Award 2017
- Winner of the Golden Kite Award for Fiction 2016
- A Junior Library Guild Selection
- Winner of the Goodreads Choice Awards 2016
- Finalist for the Amelia Elizabeth Walden Award 2017
- Notable Books for a Global Society 2017
- Winner of the Crystal Kite Award for Fiction 2017
- Publishers Weekly Best Young Adult Books of 2016
- School Library Journal Best Books of 2016
- Booklist Top Ten Books for Youth 2016
- YALSA Top Ten Teen Books of 2017
- Best Children's Book of the Year 2017 with Outstanding Merit, Children's Book Committee of Bank Street College of Education
- Shelf Awareness Best Teen Novels of 2016
- Winner of the Cybils Award for Young Adult Fiction 2016
- Los Angeles Public Library Best Teen Books of 2016
- Capitol Choices List 2017
- ILA Young Adult Reading List 2017

=== International Awards ===
- Winner of the CIal in the UK
- Winner of the Golden Dragon Book Award in Hong Kong
- Winner of the Prix Farniente in Belgium
- Finalist for the Sakura Medal in Japan
- Finalist for the Inky Awards in Australia

=== State Awards ===
- Black Bear 2017-2018 Reading List (NM)
- California Young Reader Medal 2017-2018 Winner (CA)
- Florida Teens Read 2017-2018 Winner (FL)
- Indiana Read Alouds 2017 Master List (IN)
- Just One More Page! 2017 Master List (WI)
- Kentucky Bluegrass Award 2016-2017 master list (KY)
- Keystone to Reading Book Award 2018 Finalist (PA)
- NYC Reads 365 2017-2018 Booklist (NY)
- Pennsylvania Young Reader's Choice Award 2017-2018 Master list (PA)
- Florida Young Adult Reader's Choice Award 2016 (FL)
- Rhode Island Teen Book Award 2018 Honor Book (RI)
- Tayshas 2017 Master List (TX)
- Thumbs Up Award 2017 Honor Titles (MI)
- Virginia Reader's Choice Award 2017-2018 Winners (VA)
- Westchester Fiction Award 2017 Winner (CA)

Awards
Preceded by One	Carnegie Medal recipient 2017	Succeeded by Where the World Ends
