= Stuart Gibbs =

American author (born 1969)

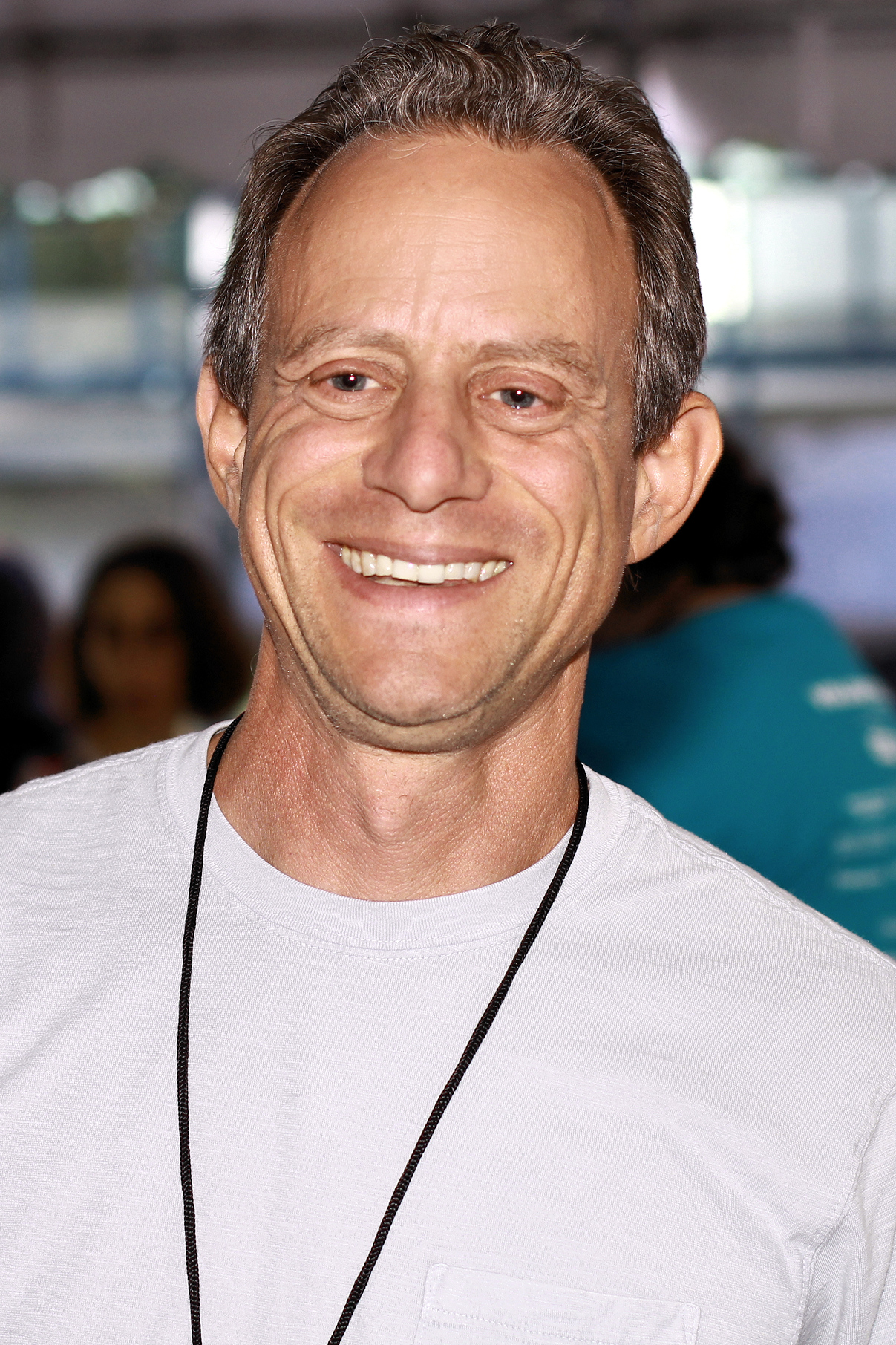
- Gibbs at the 2019 Texas Book Festival
- Born: June 11, 1969 (age 57); Philadelphia, Pennsylvania, U.S
- Education: University of Pennsylvania (BA)
- Occupation: Author
- Spouse: Suzanne Patmore Gibbs (m. 2005; died 2018)
- Website: stuartgibbs.com

Stuart Gibbs (born June 11, 1969) is an American author who has written mostly mystery and humor books that are aimed for tweens and teens.

Gibbs' books have been described as "fun, fast-paced" and "entertaining." He has written six book series: the FunJungle series, the Moon Base Alpha series, the Spy School series, the Charlie Thorne series, the Last Musketeer and Once Upon a Tim. He also wrote a Batman comic called Bruce Wayne: Not Super. Gibbs wrote screenplays for Showdown (1993), See Spot Run (2001), and Repli-Kate (2002).

== Personal life ==
Gibbs was born in 1969 in Philadelphia, Pennsylvania, moved to Washington, D.C. at five, and moved to San Antonio, Texas when he was seven. He attended the University of Pennsylvania. While in college, he studied biology.

== Family ==
Gibbs has two children, Violet and Dashiell. His wife, Suzanne, died in 2018. He is now married to Tina Tran.

== Books ==
=== FunJungle series ===
The FunJungle series is about a boy named Theodore (Teddy) Fitzroy who lives with his family in the largest zoo in America, the (fictional) titular FunJungle. Teddy and his friends solve various mysteries that occur around the zoo, trying to watch out for people that will make his life harder, such as Marge O'Malley, a security guard, and the ever dubious billionaire owner of FunJungle, J.J. McCracken. As the series progresses, Teddy becomes friends with, and later starts dating, J.J.'s daughter Summer McCracken. Currently, Teddy has solved eight mysteries that revolve around a main zoo animal who is in danger.

1. Belly Up (2010)
2. Poached (2014)
3. Big Game (2015)
4. Panda-monium (2017)
5. Lion Down (2019)
6. Tyrannosaurus Wrecks (2020)
7. Bear Bottom (2021)
8. Whale Done (2023)
9. All Ears (2025)
10. Ape Escape (2026)

=== Spy School series ===
In the Spy School series, twelve-year-old Benjamin "Ben" Ripley gets recruited to the top-secret CIA Academy of Espionage. He has several successful missions against the evil spy organization SPYDER with fellow spies Mike, Zoe, Erica Hale and her family, and several others to help him prevail every time.

Books:

1. Spy School (2012)
2. Spy Camp (2013)
3. Evil Spy School (2015)
4. Spy Ski School (2016)
5. Spy School Secret Service (2017)
6. Spy School Goes South (2018)
7. Spy School British Invasion (2019)
8. Spy School Revolution (2020)
9. Spy School at Sea (2021)
10. Spy School Project X (2022)
11. Spy School Goes North (2023)
12. Spy School Goes Wild (2024)
13. Spy School Blackout (2025)
14. Spy School Goes East (2026)

=== Moon Base Alpha series ===
The MBA series takes place in 2041 where 12-year-old Dashiell Gibson and his family are recruited to go to Moon Base Alpha, the first human lunar colony. In each book, Dashiell (nicknamed Dash) investigates dangerous occurrences.

1. Space Case (2014)
2. Spaced Out (2016)
3. Waste of Space (2018)

=== Graphic Novels ===
1. Spy School the Graphic Novel
2. Spy Camp the Graphic Novel (2023)
3. Evil Spy School the Graphic Novel (2024)
4. Spy Ski School the Graphic Novel (2025)
5. Space Case the Graphic Novel (2025)
6. Spy School Secret Service the Graphic Novel (2026)
7. Spaced Out the Graphic Novel (2026)
8. Bruce Wayne Not Super (2023)

=== Charlie Thorne series ===
The Charlie Thorne series is centered around a 12-year-old genius named Charlie Thorne, who competes against various adversaries to find dangerous discoveries hidden by distinguished individuals throughout history.

1. Charlie Thorne and the Last Equation (2019)
2. Charlie Thorne and the Lost City (2021)
3. Charlie Thorne and the Curse of Cleopatra (2022)
4. Charlie Thorne and the Royal Society (2024)

=== Once Upon A Tim series ===
This series is about a Medieval peasant named Tim who tries to become a knight.

1. Once Upon A Tim (2022)
2. The Labyrinth of Doom (2022)
3. The Sea Of Terror (2023)
4. The Quest of Danger (2023)
