= The Wright Brothers: How They Invented the Airplane =

1991 biography by Russell Freedman

- Author: Russell Freedman
- Language: English
- Genre: Children's novel
- Publisher: Clarion
- Publication date: 1991
- Publication place: United States

The Wright Brothers: How They Invented the Airplane is a 1991 children's photobiography of the Wright brothers written by biographer Russell Freedman in 1991. It covers their early lives as children, running the Wright Cycle Company, through to their famous flight December 17, 1903, at Kitty Hawk, North Carolina, to Orville's death in 1948. It was Freedman's first Newbery Honor (1992) after winning the Newbery Medal in 1988 for Lincoln: A Photobiography; it also won a Golden Kite Award in 1991 in the nonfiction category.
