= Golden Kite Award =

Children's literature award

The Golden Kite Awards are given annually by the Society of Children's Book Writers and Illustrators, an international children's writing organization, to recognize excellence in children’s literature. The award is a golden medallion showing a child flying a kite. Instituted in 1973, the Golden Kite Awards are the only children’s literary award judged by a jury of peers. Eligible books must be written or illustrated by SCBWI members, and submitted either by publishers or individuals.

The award currently recognizes literature in seven categories: "Young Reader and Middle Grade Fiction, Young Adult Fiction, Nonfiction Text for Young Readers, Nonfiction text for Older Readers, Picture Book Text, Picture Book Illustration, and Illustration for Older Readers."

Winners are chosen by a panel of judges consisting of children’s book writers and illustrators. In addition to the Golden Kite Award winners, honor book recipients are named by the judges. Since 2006, each category's winner wins a $2,500 grant cash prize, as well as $1,000 to donate to their chosen non-profit organization. Honor winners receive $500, as well as $250 to donate.

Since 2003, the Sid Fleischman Award for excellence in humorous writing is given in conjunction with the Golden Kite Awards.

== Recipients ==
In the following table, the year represents the year the awards were given, which is the year following publication. For example, the 2000 awards are for books published in 1999.

Golden Kite Award winners
Year	Category	Author	Illustrator	Title
1974		Bette Greene		Summer of My German Soldier
1975		Jane Yolen		The Girl Who Cried Flowers
1976		Carol Farley		The Garden Is Doing Fine
1977		Eve Bunting		One More Flight
1978	Fiction	Bernice Rabe		The Girl Who Had No Name
1978	Nonfiction	Robert McClung		Peeper, First Voice of Spring
1979	Fiction	Stella Pevsner		And You Give Me a Pain, Elaine
1979	Nonfiction	Phyllis Reynolds Naylor		How I Came to Be a Writer
1980	Fiction	C. S. Adler		The Magic of the Gifts
1980	Nonfiction	Arnold Madison		Runaway Teens
1981	Fiction	Patricia MacLachlan		Arthur, For the Very First Time
1981	Nonfiction	Dorothy Hinshaw Patent		The Lives of Spiders
1982	Fiction	M. E. Kerr		Little, Little
1982	Nonfiction	Elizabeth Helfman		Blissymbolics
1983	Fiction	Beverly Cleary		Ralph S. Mouse
1983	Nonfiction	James Cross Giblin		Chimney Sweeps
1983	Picture Book Illustration	Tomie de Paola	Tomie de Paola	Giorgio's Village
1984	Fiction	Gloria Skurzynski		The Tempering
1984	Nonfiction	Helen Roney Sattler		The Illustrated Dinosaur Dictionary
1984	Picture Book Illustration	Trina Schart Hyman	Trina Schart Hyman	Little Red Riding Hood
1985	Fiction	Belinda Hurmence		Tancy
1985	Nonfiction	James Cross Giblin		Walls: Defenses Throughout History
1985	Picture Book Illustration	Audrey Wood	Don Wood	The Napping House
1986	Fiction	Patricia MacLachlan		Sarah, Plain and Tall
1986	Nonfiction	Rhoda Blumberg		Commodore Perry in the Land of the Shogun
1986	Picture Book Illustration	Barbara Helen Berger	Barbara Helen Berger	The Donkey's Dream
1987	Fiction	Margaret Rostkowski		After the Dancing Days
1987	Nonfiction	Milton Meltzer		Poverty in America
1987	Picture Book Illustration	Suse MacDonald	Suse MacDonald	Alphabetics
1988	Fiction	Lois Lowry		Rabble Starkey
1988	Nonfiction	Rhoda Blumberg		Incredible Journey of Lewis and Clark
1988	Picture Book Illustration	Valerie Scho Carey	Arnold Lobel	The Devil and Mother Crump
1989	Fiction	George Ella Lyon		Borrowed Children
1989	Nonfiction	James Cross Giblin		Let There Be Light
1989	Picture Book Illustration	Rosemary Wells	Susan Jeffers	Forest of Dreams
1990	Fiction	Kristiana Gregory		Jenny of the Tetons
1990	Nonfiction	Judith St. George		Panama Canal: Gateway to the World
1990	Picture Book Illustration	Richard Jesse Watson	Richard Jesse Watson	Tom Thumb
1991	Fiction	Avi		The True Confessions of Charlotte Doyle
1991	Nonfiction	Jim Murphy		The Boys' War: Confederate and Union soldiers talk about the Civil War
1991	Picture Book Illustration	Crescent Dragonwagon	Jerry Pinkney	Home Place
1992	Fiction	Jean Thesman		The Rain Catchers
1992	Nonfiction	Russell Freedman		The Wright Brothers
1992	Picture Book Illustration	Barbara M. Joosse	Barbara Lavallee	Mama Do You Love Me?
1993	Fiction	Mary E. Lyons		Letters From a Slave Girl
1993	Nonfiction	Jim Murphy		The Long Road to Gettysburg
1993	Picture Book Illustration	Patricia Polacco	Patricia Polacco	Chicken Sunday
1994	Fiction	Virginia Euwer Wolff		Make Lemonade
1994	Nonfiction	Russell Freedman		Eleanor Roosevelt
1994	Picture Book Illustration	Caroline Stutson	Kevin Hawkes	By the Light of the Halloween Moon
1995	Fiction	Karen Cushman		Catherine, Called Birdy
1995	Nonfiction	Russell Freedman		Kids at Work: Lewis Hine and the Crusade Against Child Labor
1995	Picture Book Illustration	Keith Baker	Keith Baker	Big Fat Hen
1996	Fiction	Christopher Paul Curtis		The Watsons Go to Birmingham – 1963
1996	Nonfiction	Natalie S. Bober		Abigail Adams
1996	Picture Book Illustration	Dennis Nolan and Lauren Mills		Fairy Wings
1997	Fiction	Eloise McGraw		The Moorchild
1997	Nonfiction	Peg Kehret		Small Steps: The Year I Got Polio
1997	Picture Book Illustration	Eve Bunting	Holly Berry	Market Day
1997	Picture Book Text	Diane Stanley	G. Brian Karas	Saving Sweetness
1998	Fiction	Donna Jo Napoli		Stones in Water
1998	Nonfiction	Arlene Schulman		Carmine's Story: A Book About a Boy Living with AIDS
1998	Picture Book Illustration	Marguerite W. Davol	Robert Sabuda	The Paper Dragon
1998	Picture Book Text	Marguerite W. Davol	Robert Sabuda	The Paper Dragon
1999	Fiction	Joan Bauer		Rules of the Road
1999	Nonfiction	Russell Freedman		Martha Graham: A Dancer's Life
1999	Picture Book Illustration	Uri Shulevitz	Uri Shulevitz	Snow
1999	Picture Book Text	Kristine O'Connell George	Kate Kiesler	Old Elm Speaks: Tree Poems
2000	Fiction	Laurie Halse Anderson		Speak
2000	Nonfiction	Marianne J. Dyson		Space Station Science: Life in Free Fall
2000	Picture Book Illustration	Philemon Sturges	Amy Wolrod	The Little Red Hen (Makes a Pizza)
2000	Picture Book Text	Deborah Hopkinson	Raul Colon	A Band of Angels
2001	Fiction	Kathleen Karr		The Boxer
2001	Nonfiction	Ellen Levine		Darkness over Denmark
2001	Picture Book Illustration	David Shannon		The Rain Came Down
2001	Picture Book Text	Jane Kurtz		River Friendly, River Wild
2002	Fiction	Virginia Euwer Wolff		True Believer
2002	Nonfiction	Susan Campbell Bartoletti		Black Potatoes: The Story of the Great Irish Famine
2002	Picture Book Illustration	Beth Krommes		The Lamp, the Ice, and the Boat Called Fish
2002	Picture Book Text	J. Patrick Lewis	Chris Sheban	The Shoe Tree of Chagrin
2003	Fiction	Jaïra Placide		Fresh Girl
2003	Nonfiction	Elizabeth Partridge		This Land was Made for You and Me: The Life and Songs of Woody Guthrie
2003	Picture Book Illustration	Linda Smith	Marla Frazee	Mrs. Biddlebox
2003	Picture Book Text	Sarah Wilson		George Hogglesberry: Grade School Alien
2003	Sid Fleischman Humor Award	Sid Fleischman		
2004	Fiction	Jerry Spinelli		Milkweed
2004	Nonfiction	Robert Byrd		Leonardo: Beautiful Dreamer
2004	Picture Book Illustration	Angela Johnson	Loren Long	I Dream Of Trains
2004	Picture Book Text	Amy Timberlake	Adam Rex	The Dirty Cowboy
2004	Sid Fleischman Humor Award	Lisa Yee		Millicent Min, Girl Genius
2005	Fiction	Christopher Paul Curtis		Bucking The Sarge
2005	Nonfiction	Michael L. Cooper		Dust To Eat: Drought and Depression in the 1930s
2005	Picture Book Illustration	Jean Cassels	Jean Cassels	The Mysterious Collection of Dr. David Harleyson
2005	Picture Book Text	Deborah Hopkinson	Nancy Carpenter	Apples to Oregon
2005	Sid Fleischman Humor Award	Gennifer Choldenko		Al Capone Does My Shirts
2006	Fiction	Mary E. Pearson		A Room on Lorelei Street
2006	Nonfiction	Russell Freedman		Children of the Great Depression
2006	Picture Book Illustration	Jane Yolen	Melissa Sweet	Baby Bear's Chairs
2006	Picture Book Text	Pat Mora	Raul Colón	Doña Flor
2006	Sid Fleischman Humor Award	David LaRochelle		Absolutely Positively Not
2007	Fiction	Tony Abbott		Firegirl
2007	Nonfiction	Russell Freedman		The Adventures of Marco Polo
2007	Picture Book Illustration	Susanna Pitzer	Larry Day	Not Afraid of Dogs
2007	Picture Book Text	Walter Dean Myers	Christopher Myers	Jazz
2007	Sid Fleischman Humor Award	Sara Pennypacker		Clementine
2008	Fiction	Katherine Applegate	Katherine Applegate	Home of the Brave
2008	Nonfiction	Ann Bausum	Ann Bausum	Muckrackers
2008	Picture Book Illustration	Yuyi Morales	Yuyi Morales	Little Night
2008	Picture Book Text	Sara Pennypacker	Petra Mathers	Pierre in Love
2009	Fiction	Steve Watkins		Down Sand Mountain
2009	Nonfiction	Pamela S. Turner		A Life in the Wild
2009	Picture Book Illustration	Hyewon Yum	Hyewon Yum	Last Night
2009	Picture Book Text	Bonny Becker	Kady MacDonald Denton	A Visitor for Bear
2009	Sid Fleischman Humor Award	Donna Gephart		As If Being 12 3/4 Isn't Bad Enough, My Mother Is Running For President
2010	Fiction	Julia Durango		Sea of the Dead
2010	Nonfiction	Ashley Bryan		Words to My Life's Song
2010	Picture Book Illustration	Pat Mora	John Parra	Gracias Thanks
2010	Picture Book Text	Marion Dane Bauer	Ted Lewin	The Longest Night
2010	Sid Fleischman Humor Award	Allen Zadoff		Food, Girls, and Other Things I Can't Have
2011	Fiction	Jennifer L. Holm		Turtle in Paradise
2011	Nonfiction	Tanya Lee Stone		The Good, The Bad, and The Barbie: A Doll's History and Her Impact On Us
2011	Picture Book Illustration	Salley Mavor	Salley Mavor	Pocketful of Posies: A Treasury of Nursery Rhymes
2011	Picture Book Text	Rukhsana Khan	Sophie Blackall	Big Red Lollipop
2011	Sid Fleischman Humor Award	Alan Silberberg		Milo: Sticky Notes and Brain Freeze
2012	Fiction	Ruta Sepetys		Between Shades of Gray
2012	Nonfiction	Candace Fleming		Amelia Lost: The Life and Disappearance of Amelia Earhart
2012	Picture Book Illustration	Melissa Sweet	Melissa Sweet	Balloons Over Broadway
2012	Picture Book Text	Kate Messner	Christopher Silas Neal	Over and Under the Snow
2012	Sid Fleischman Humor Award	Chris Rylander		The Fourth Stall
2013	Fiction	Joanne Rocklin		The Five Lives of Our Cat Zook
2013	Nonfiction	Jeri Chase Ferris		Noah Webster and His Words
2013	Picture Book Illustration	K.G. Campbell	K.G. Campbell	Lester's Dreadful Sweaters
2013	Picture Book Text	Mara Rockliff	William Low	Me and Momma and Big John
2013	Sid Fleischman Humor Award	Mo Willems		Goldilocks and the Three Dinosaurs
2014	Fiction	Tim Federle		Better Nate Than Ever
2014	Nonfiction	David Meissner		Call of the Klondike
2014	Picture Book Illustration	Peter Brown	Peter Brown	Mr. Tiger Goes Wild
2014	Picture Book Text	Pat Zietlow Miller	Anne Wilsdorf	Sophie's Squash
2014	Sid Fleischman Humor Award	Bill Konigsberg		Openly Straight
2015	Fiction	Deborah Wiles		Revolution
2015	Nonfiction	Candace Fleming		The Family Romanov: Murder, Rebellion, and the Fall of Imperial Russia
2015	Picture Book Illustration	Jen Bryant	Melissa Sweet	The Right Word: Roget and His Thesaurus
2015	Picture Book Text	Kristy Dempsey	Floyd Cooper	A Dance Like Starlight: One Ballerina's Dream
2015	Sid Fleischman Humor Award	Michelle Knudsen		Evil Librarian
2016	Middle Grade Fiction	Kate Hannigan		The Detective's Assistant
2016	Nonfiction	Margarita Engle		Enchanted Air: Two Cultures, Two Wings: A Memoir
2016	Picture Book Illustration	Phil Bildner	John Parra	Marvelous Cornelius
2016	Picture Book Text	Jessixa Bagley	Jessixa Bagley	Boats for Papa
2016	Sid Fleischman Humor Award	Molly B. Burnham	Trevor Spencer	Teddy Mars: Almost a World Record Beaker
2016	Young Adult Fiction	Neal Shusterman		Challenger Deep
2017	Middle Grade Fiction	Eugene Yelchin		The Haunting of Falcon House
2017	Picture Book Illustration	Stacy Innerst		The Music in George's Head
2017	Nonfiction	Russell Freedman	Russell Freedman	We Will Not Be Silent
2017	Picture Book Text	Lisa Wheeler	Jerry Pinkney	The Christmas Boot
2017	Sid Fleischman Humor Award	Chris Grabenstein		Welcome to Wonderland: Home Sweet Motel
2017	Young Adult Fiction	Ruta Sepetys		Salt to the Sea
2018	Middle Grade Fiction	Jack Cheng		See You in the Cosmos
2018	Nonfiction Text for Older Readers	Deborah Heiligman		Vincent and Theo: The Van Gogh Brothers
2018	Nonfiction Text for Younger Readers	Carole Boston Weatherford		Schomburg: The Man Who Built a Library
2018	Picture Book Illustration	Kenard Pak	Kenard Pak	Goodbye Autumn, Hello Winter
2018	Picture Book Text	Carolyn Crimi	Laurel Molk	There Might Be Lobsters
2018	Sid Fleischman Humor Award	Crystal Allen		The Magnificent Mya Tibb: The Wall of Fame Game
2018	Young Adult Fiction	Elana K. Arnold		What Girls Are Made Of
2019	Middle Grade Fiction	Susan Hood		Lifeboat 12
2019	Nonfiction Text for Older Readers	Elizabeth Partridge		Boots on the Ground: America's War in Vietnam
2019	Nonfiction Text for Younger Readers	Barb Rosenstock		Otis and Will Discover the Deep
2019	Picture Book Illustration	Carole Lexa Schaefer	Becca Stadtlander	Made by Hand: A Crafts Sampler
2019	Picture Book Text	Jessie Oliveros	Danda Wulfekotte	The Remember Balloons
2019	Sid Fleischman Humor Award	Angela Dominguez		Stella Diaz Has Something to Say
2019	Young Adult Fiction	Jane Yolen		Mapping the Bones
2020	Nonfiction Text for Older Readers	Deborah Heiligman		Torpedoed: The True Story of the World War II Sinking of the Children's Ship
2020	Nonfiction Text for Younger Readers	Elizabeth Rusch		Mario and the Hole in the Sky: How a Chemist Saved Our Planet
2020	Picture Book Illustration	Muon Thj Van	Hyewon Yum	Clever Little Witch
2020	Picture Book Text	Ashley Benham Yazdani		A Green Place to Be: The Creation of Central Park
2020	Sid Fleischman Humor Award	Remy Lai		Pie in the Sky
2020	Young Adult Fiction	Julie Berry		Lovely War
2020	Young Reader and Middle Grade Fiction	Padma Venkatraman		The Bridge Home
2021	Illustrated Book for Older Readers	Uri Shulevitz		Chance: Escape from the Holocaust: Memories of a Refugee Childhood
2021	Middle Grade/Young Readers Fiction	Renée Watson		Ways to Make Sunshine
2021	Nonfiction Text for Older Readers	Christina Soontornvat		All Thirteen: The Incredible Cave Rescue of the Thai Boys' Soccer Team
2021	Nonfiction Text for Younger Readers	Don Tate		William Still and His Freedom Stories
2021	Picture Book Illustration	Matthew Burgess	Catia Chien	The Bear and the Moon
2021	Picture Book Text	Tami Charles	Bryan Collier	All Because You Matter
2021	Sid Fleischman Humor Award	Donna Barba Higuera		Lupe Wong Won't Dance
2021	Young Adult Fiction	Sherri L. Smith		The Blossom and the Firefly
2022	Illustrated Book for Older Readers	Rukhsanna Guidroz	Fahmida Azim	Samira Surfs
2022	Middle Grade Fiction	Rajani LaRocca		Red, White, and Whole
2022	Nonfiction Text for Older Readers	Ariel Henley		A Face for Picasso: Coming of Age with Crouzon Syndrome
2022	Nonfiction Text for Older Readers	Anton Treuer		Everything You Wanted to Know About Indians but Were Afraid to Ask: Young Readers Edition
2022	Nonfiction Text for Younger Readers	Colleen Paeff	Nancy Carpenter	The Great Stink: How Joseph Bazalgette Solved London’s Poop Pollution Problem
2022	Picture Book Illustration	Stephen Costanza		King of Ragtime: The Story of Scott Joplin
2022	Picture Book Text	Joanna Ho	Dung Ho	Eyes That Kiss in the Corners
2022	Young Adult Fiction	Pamela N. Harris		When You Look Like Us
2023	Illustrated Book for Older Readers	Isabel Roxas		The Adventures of Team Pom: Squid Happens
2023	Middle Grade Fiction	Michael Leali		The Civil War of Amos Abernathy
2023	Nonfiction Text for Older Readers	Tara Lazar		Absurd Words: A Kids’ Fun and Hilarious Vocabulary Builder for Future Word Nerds
2023	Nonfiction Text for Younger Readers	Stacy McAnulty	David Litchfield	Our Planet: There’s No Place Like Earth
2023	Picture Book Illustration	Kyo Maclear	Nathalie Dion	Kumo the Bashful Cloud
2023	Picture Book Text	Brittany J. Thurman	Anna Cunha	Fly
2023	Sid Fleischman Humor Award	Tracy Badua		Freddie vs. the Family Curse
2023	Young Adult Fiction	Emily Inouye Huey		Beneath the Wide Silk Sky
2024	Illustrated Book for Older Readers	Sharee Miller	Sharee Miller	Curlfriends (New in Town)
2024	Middle Grade Fiction	Katherine Marsh		The Lost Year
2024	Nonfiction Text for Older Readers	Elizabeth Rusch		The 21: The True Story of the Youth Who Sued the U.S. Government Over Climate Change
2024	Nonfiction Text for Younger Readers	Michelle Markel	Barbara McClintock	Tomfoolery: Randolph Caldecott and the Rambunctious Coming-of-Age of Children's Books
2024	Picture Book Illustration	Vashti Harrison	Vashti Harrison	Big
2024	Picture Book Text	Anne Wynter	Daniel Miyares	Nell Plants a Tree
2024	Sid Fleischman Humor Award	Martha Brockenbrough		To Catch a Thief
2024	Young Adult Fiction	Elana K. Arnold		The Blood Years
2025	Illustrated Book for Older Readers	Maria van Lieshout	Maria van Lieshout	Song of a Blackbird
2025	Middle Grade Fiction	Allie Millington		Once for Yes
2025	Nonfiction Text for Older Readers	Ann Bausum		White Lies: How the South Lost the Civil War, Then Rewrote the History
2025	Nonfiction Text for Younger Readers	Rajani LaRocca	Huy Voun Lee	Some of Us: A Story of Citizenship and the United States
2025	Picture Book Illustration	Alexander Smalls and Denene Millner	Frank Morrison	When Alexander Graced the Table
2025	Picture Book Text	Mariahadessa Ekere Tallie	Aaron Becker	We Go Slow
2025	Sid Fleischman Humor Award	K. E. Lewis	Isabel Roxas	Never Take Your Rhino on a Plane
2025	Young Adult Fiction	Maria van Lieshout	Maria van Lieshout	Song of a Blackbird
