= Eleanor Roosevelt: A Life of Discovery =

1993 biography by Russell Freedman

- Author: Russell Freedman
- Language: English
- Genre: Children's novel
- Publisher: Clarion
- Publication date: 1993
- Publication place: United States

Eleanor Roosevelt: A Life of Discovery is a children's photobiography of Eleanor Roosevelt written by biographer Russell Freedman in 1993, and is a companion book to Freedman's earlier book Franklin Delano Roosevelt. It was a Newbery Honor book in 1994, Freedman's second, as well as a Golden Kite Award winner in the nonfiction category (1993), Freedman's second.
