= John Malam =

British historian, archaeologist, and author

- Born: Wolverhampton
- Occupation: Writer
- Writing career
- Period: 1985-present
- Genre: Children's literature
- Website: www.johnmalam.co.uk

John Malam is a British historian, archaeologist, and author of Children's non-fiction (informational) books.

== Background ==
He was born in Wolverhampton, England, and attended the University of Birmingham where he received a degree in Ancient History and Archaeology. He excavated at sites in the UK, and headed the archaeology unit at the Ironbridge Gorge Museum Trust, Shropshire. Thereafter, he worked as an editor for UK publishing companies before becoming a full-time author. His informational books for children cover a range of subjects, with a particular emphasis on ancient civilizations. He lives in Cheshire, north-west England.

== Books ==
He has written a lot of Books like; You Wouldn't Want to Be..., 100 Facts or Dinosaur Encyclopedias.

You Wouldn't Want to Be a Roman Gladiator!

You Wouldn't Want to Live in Pompeii!

You Wouldn't Want to Be a Ninja Warrior!

You Wouldn't Want to Be a Secret Agent in World War Two!

Encyclopedia of Dinosaurs and Other Prehistoric Creatures

== See also ==
- List of children's non-fiction writers
