= The Voice That Challenged a Nation =

2004 children's book by Russell Freedman

The Voice That Challenged a Nation: Marian Anderson and the Struggle for Equal Rights
- Author: Russell Freedman
- Language: English
- Genre: Biography
- Published: 2004
- Publisher: Clarion Books
- Publication place: United States
- Media type: Print
- Pages: 128 pp
- ISBN: 978-0547480343

The Voice That Challenged a Nation: Marian Anderson and the Struggle for Equal Rights is a 2004 children's nonfiction book by Russell Freedman. It received both a Sibert Medal and a Newbery Honor Book award in 2005. The book tells the story of Marian Anderson, an African-American contralto, who during her journey to establishing a singing career, inadvertently became an activist for civil and political rights.

== Plot ==
From an early age, Marian Anderson displayed a natural talent for singing. As a child, she sang in church and in other local events where she would earn up to fifty cents. Throughout high school, Anderson continued singing and eventually began taking vocal lessons. After gaining enough recognition, she was invited to sing at an event in Georgia where she, for the first time, was introduced to the segregation associated with the Jim Crow laws. After completing high school at the age of 24, she continued touring, continually encountering Jim Crow laws along the way.

Her appearances were well-received and praised, with some occasional negative reviews. In 1924, she appeared at New York City’s Town Hall where many seats remained empty. Newspaper articles described her singing, that night, as faulty and under-developed. Deeply affected by this, Anderson refused to sing for months. After her hiatus, her vocal coach, Giuseppe Boghetti, entered her in a contest where Anderson won, beating about 300 other contestants.

Anderson traveled overseas to England where she gained a newfound fanbase and found herself in a segregation-free environment. When she returned home she replaced her pianist – a good friend of Anderson's – and began working with a Finnish accompanist, Kosti Vehanen. This was a critical move for Anderson's career, to work professionally with a white man in the United States. In 1936 Anderson was invited by First Lady Eleanor Roosevelt to perform at the White House. In her newspaper column the next day, Roosevelt recalled the event and praised Anderson’s voice and singing career.

Anderson was continually prohibited from singing at Washington, D.C.'s DAR Constitution Hall because of a “whites only” policy. She was driven to continue trying, not to make a statement about her race, but because she felt she had the right as an artist to perform there. To send a message against the inequality between whites and blacks, Roosevelt arranged for Anderson to perform in a concert at the Lincoln Memorial. On April 9, 1939, Anderson performed in front of a crowd of 75,000, in one of the most memorable and influential performances of her life.

She continued to advocate for equal rights and performing in well-known venues. She sang at the August 1963 March on Washington for Jobs and Freedom, where Martin Luther King Jr. delivered his "I Have A Dream" speech. First Lady Eleanor Roosevelt became a vehement supporter of Anderson and equal rights, which eventually turned into a lifelong friendship with the singer.

Marian Anderson died on April 8, 1993, a day before the anniversary of her concert at Lincoln Memorial. She was 96 years old.

== Critical reception ==
The book has received mostly positive reviews. It has been praised for Freedman's description of Anderson's trajectory through text and various black and white images. Roger Sutton of Horn Book Magazine gives credit to Freedman for depicting Anderson's "accomplishments of an individual as both an actor in and an emblem of her time." School Library Journal declares the book to be "an important volume for all students of music, biography, and history."

== Awards ==
It received both a Newbery Honor Book award and a Sibert Medal in 2005.

== See also ==
- List of children's non-fiction writers
