= Philip Steele =

British writer (born 1948)

- Born: Dorking
- Occupation: Writer
- Writing career
- Period: 1980–present
- Genre: Non-Fiction
- Website: philipsteele.co.uk

Philip Nicholas Steele (born 17 May 1948) is an English author, chiefly of children's non-fiction.

Steele was born in Dorking, Surrey, England. He attended Felsted School and University College, Durham, graduating in Modern Languages in 1971. In the 1970s he worked as an editor for various book publishers in London, including Hodder and Hamlyn. In 1980 he moved to the Isle of Anglesey, in North Wales, where he now lives.

He has written on a wide range of topics, especially in the fields of history, junior biography, peoples and cultures. Many of his books are illustrated international co-editions, published in various languages, while others are aimed more specifically at the British market. Steele has also written adult books dealing with the history and landscape of North Wales.

== See also ==
- List of children's non-fiction writers
