= List of children's non-fiction writers =

This is a list of authors who have written non-fiction (informational) books for children. For a discussion of the criteria used to define something as a work of children's literature, see children's literature.

- Peter Ackroyd (UK, born 1949) – history
- David A. Adler (US, born 1947) – biographies
- Agnes Allen (UK) – social history
- Jules Archer (US, 1915–2008) – US history and politics
- Philip Ardagh (UK, born 1961) – history, archaeology, mythology
- Jennifer Armstrong (US, born 1961) – exploration
- Caroline S. Arnold (US) – nonfiction books about animals, fossils, world cultures, global warming, and life cycles
- Nick Arnold (UK, born 1964) – science, zoology
- Russell Ash (UK, 1946–2010) – reference inc. The Top 10 of Everything
- Robert Baden-Powell, 1st Baron Baden-Powell (UK) – Scouting
- Kelly Barnhill (US) – sewers, medicine
- Thelma and Corydon Bell (US) – science, weather, time
- Mary Boone (US) – nature/environment, history, world cultures, pop culture
- Aliki Brandenberg (US) – history
- Maria Elizabeth Budden (UK) – history and upbringing
- Brian P. Cleary (US) – words, measurements
- Daniel Cohen (US) – UFOs, the occult, ghosts, crypto-zoology
- Joanna Cole (US) – science
- Sneed B. Collard (US) – science, biology, conservation
- Esther Copley (UK) – slavery, Bible natural history
- Honor Cargill-Martin (UK) – history, mythology/folklore, classical studies
- Peter Corey (UK) – relationships, psychology, self-help; Coping With...
- Sara Jane Crafts (US) – songs
- Terry Deary (UK) – history, true stories
- Dougal Dixon (UK) – futuristic zoology
- Dorcas Dole (England) – Quakerism
- Eleanor Doorly (UK) – history, biography
- Evelyn Everett-Green (UK) – biography
- Fanny Fern (US, 1811–1872) – humor, society
- Mrs. E. M. Field (Ireland) – history
- Leonard Everett Fisher (US) – colonial American craftsmen, legendary figures
- Russell Freedman (US) – history and biography
- Jackie French (Australia) – Australian history, natural history
- Jean Fritz (US) – US history and legend
- Anita Ganeri (UK) – geography
- Gail Gibbons (US) – folklore, zoology, geography, history
- Roger Lancelyn Green (UK) – myth, folklore, biography
- Joyce Hansen (US) – African-American history, biography
- Gerald Hausman (US) – biography, mythology, folklore
- Gail Hennessey (US) – economics, biography
- Don Herbert (US) – science
- Susie Hodge (UK) – art history, practical art, history, science, religion, biography
- James Janeway (England) – A Token For Children: stories of conversions
- William Loren Katz (US) – African-American and Native American history
- Jennie Ellis Keysor (US, 1860–1945) – American literature, art topics
- Hiba Noor Khan (UK) – biography, science/physics
- Kathleen Krull (US) – biography, music, folklore
- Poul Lange (Denmark and USA) – simple anatomy (body orifices)
- Kathryn Lasky (US) – history, biography
- Julius Lester (US) – African-American history
- David Macaulay (US) – architecture, technology, design
- John Malam (UK) – ancient history, archaeology, biography, natural history
- Jane Marcet (UK) – chemistry, political economy, grammar
- Mrs Markham (UK, real name Elizabeth Penrose – English history
- Sandra Markle (US) – science
- Fredrick McKissack (US) – African-American history, biography
- Patricia McKissack (US) – African-American history, biography
- Arthur Mee (UK) – reference, British geography
- Milton Meltzer (US) – Jewish, African-American and American history, biography
- Jenny B. Merrill (US) – Bible stories
- Iain Moncreiffe of that Ilk (UK) – heraldry, royalty, Scottish clans
- Jim Murphy (US) – US history
- Darcy Pattison (US) – science, science history, and US history
- L. du Garde Peach (UK) – historical biography
- Pickles (pen name of Lisa Tolliver) – educational activity books
- Ferry Piekart (NL) – cultural anthropology
- Tillie S. Pine (Poland / US) – traditional cultures and contemporary science
- Kjartan Poskitt (UK) – maths
- Rhoda Power and Eileen Power (UK) – history
- Charles Ray (UK) – editor of children's encyclopedias, such as Everybody's Enquire Within
- Upendrakishore Raychowdhury (India) – Bengali
- Ana María Rodríguez (US) – nature, science, cultures, history, health
- Acharya Ramlochan Saran (India) – non-fiction Sanskrit, Hindi, Urdu, Maithili, English, Nepalese
- Helen Roney Sattler (US) – natural history, science and technology
- Miriam Schlein (US) – animals, space, time
- Millicent Selsam (US) – biology
- Elizabeth Missing Sewell (UK) – religion, education theory
- Bonnie Shemie (US) – history of architecture
- Katherine Binney Shippen (US) – history, invention, music
- Seymour Simon (US) – science
- Marilyn Singer (US) – zoology
- Armstrong Sperry (US) – history, exploration, ethnology
- Diane Stanley (US) – biographies
- Philip Steele (UK) – history, junior biographies, peoples and cultures
- Dugald Steer (UK) – Ologies
- Dorothy Sterling (US) – nature, US history, civil rights
- Shelley Tanaka (Canada) – history, biography, arts, archeology, environment
- Isabel Thomas (UK) – science
- R. J. Unstead (UK) – history
- Hendrik Willem van Loon (NL/US, 1882–1944) – history
- Glen Vecchione (US, born 1951) – science, street games
- Anne de Vries (NL) – history and religion
- Priscilla Wakefield (UK, 1751–1832) – science, recreation and travel
- Mildred Pitts Walter (US) – African-American history and culture
- Nadia Wheatley (Australia) – environment and multiculturalism
- Philip Wilkinson (UK) – history, the arts, religion and architecture
- Herbert S. Zim (US) – Golden Guides series, nature, science and technology
- Allan Zullo (US) – survival, true stories, ghosts and sport

== See also ==
- List of children's literature writers
- List of non-fiction writers
