= Lincoln: A Photobiography =

1987 book by Russell Freedman

- Cover of Lincoln: A Photobiography
- Author: Russell Freedman
- Language: English
- Genre: Biography
- Publisher: Clarion Books/Houghton Mifflin Harcourt
- Publication date: 1987
- Publication place: United States
- Pages: 150
- ISBN: 0-395-51848-2
- OCLC: 15053078
- LC Class: E457.905 F73 1987

Lincoln: A Photobiography is an illustrated biography of Abraham Lincoln written by Russell Freedman, and published in 1987. The book won the Newbery Medal in 1988, the first nonfiction book to do so in 30 years. Freedman selected the photographs that fill the book from the National Archives, National Portrait Gallery, Library of Congress, and museums in Indiana, Illinois, Massachusetts, and New York.

The photobiography covers Lincoln's entire life: his childhood, his stint as a lawyer, his courtship and marriage to Mary Todd Lincoln, as well as his ascent from Congressman to President, and his assassination and death.

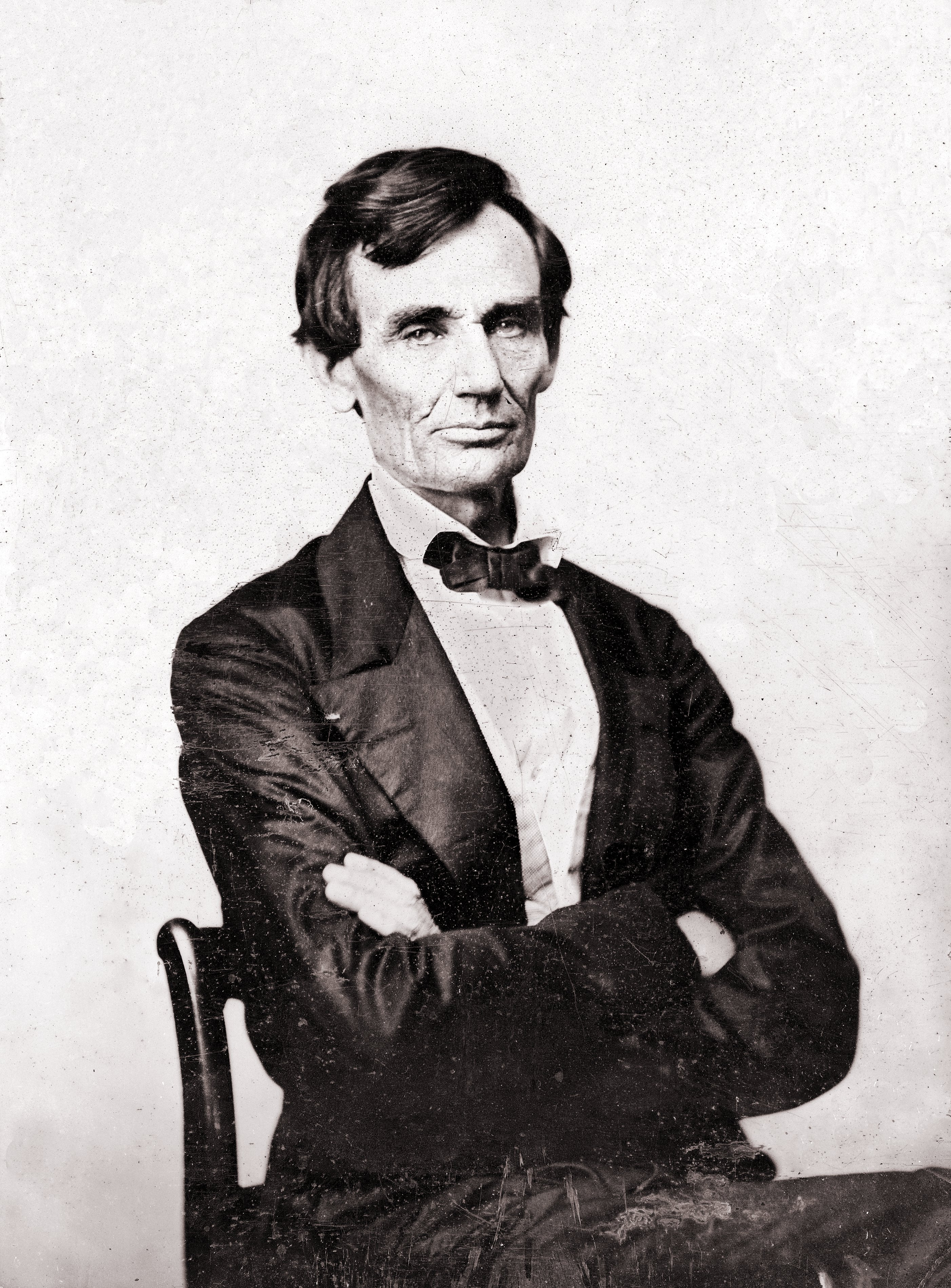
Abraham Lincoln O-36 by Butler, 1860-crop. Freedman uses many portraits of Lincoln throughout his book.

== Critical reception ==
The book was positively received, winning a Cardinal Cup Award and a Golden Kite Award honor, in addition to the Newbery Medal.

According to Kirkus Reviews, "While the photographs contribute much, it is Freedman's talent for putting the right details in uncomplicated prose that provides a very sharp focus for this Lincoln portrait." The New York Times praised Freedman for his extensive research, and for skillfully writing about a complex subject for children "by choosing to trust in the intelligence of the youthful reader," though the review also said that Freedman "omits some needed perspective for his modern young readers of all races."

Awards
| Preceded by The Whipping Boy | Newbery Medal recipient 1988 | Succeeded by Joyful Noise: Poems for Two Voices |
