= Eyes That Kiss in the Corners =

2021 picture book

- Book cover
- Author: Joanna Ho
- Illustrator: Dung Ho
- Language: English
- Publisher: HarperCollins
- Publication date: January 5, 2021
- Publication place: United States
- Media type: Picture book
- Pages: 40
- ISBN: 9780062915627
- Followed by: Eyes That Speak to the Stars

Eyes That Kiss in the Corners is a 2021 picture book by Joanna Ho, published by HarperCollins on January 5, 2021, as her debut work. Ho aimed to show the beauty of East Asian eyes while also showing that everyone is beautiful. A sequel titled Eyes That Speak to the Stars was published in February 2022.

== Plot ==
A Chinese American girl thinks of how her eyes are not the same as those around her. She thinks about her family's eyes such as her mother's sparkling like sunlight and her grandmother's eyes having the ability to look far into her heart despite her eyes not working as well as they used to. Chinese culture and its landscapes are included within the story.

== Publication ==
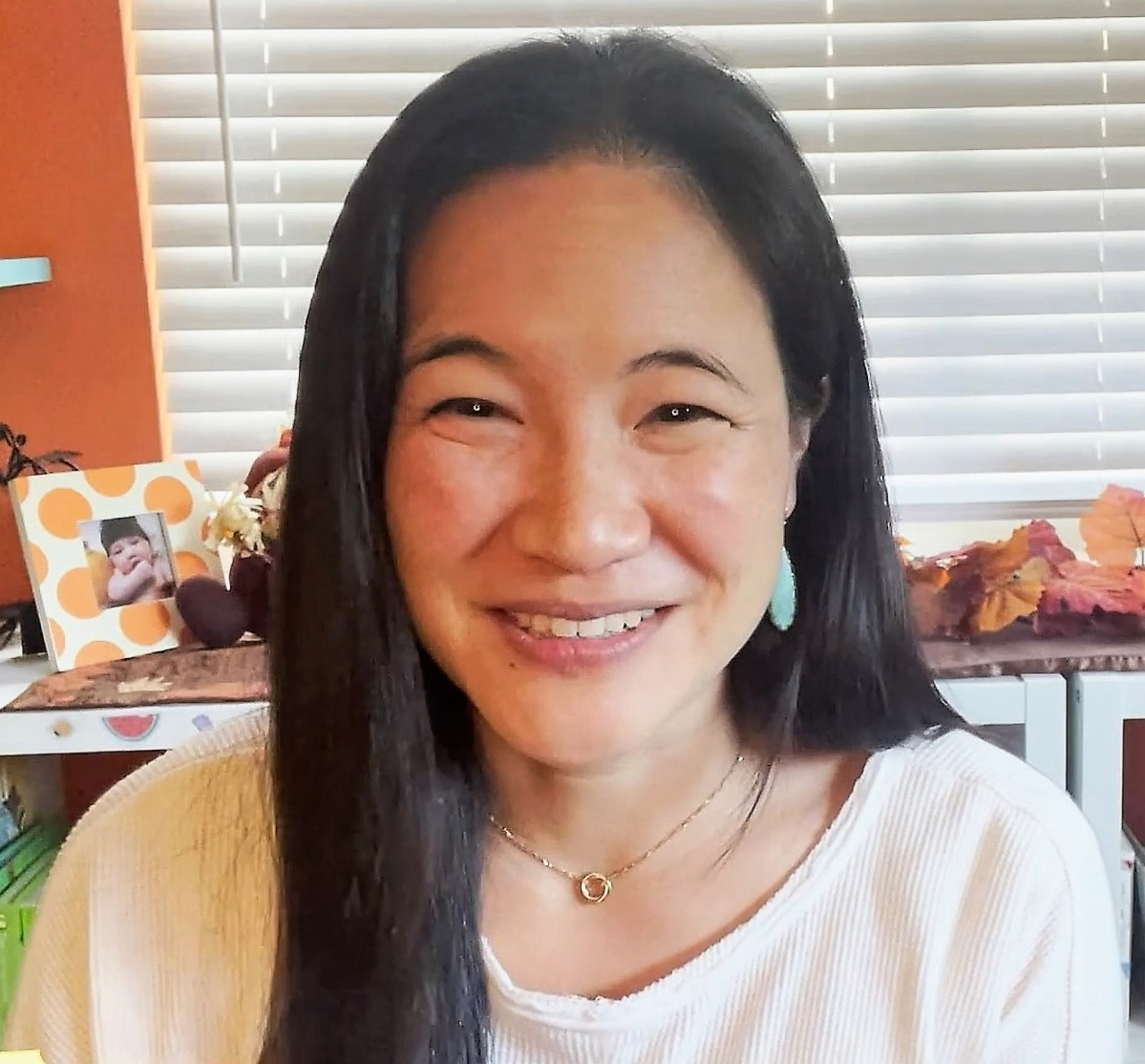
Author Joanna Ho in 2021

Ho aimed to publish a picture book that showed the other side of beauty not shown in western media which tends to focus on a narrow view of beauty. She wanted to write it as a picture book that showed not just physical beauty in relation to East Asian eyes, but the power those of East Asian heritage have to makes changes in the world. Ho edited and revised the book for years and Dung Ho of HarperCollins completed the illustrations. After being published in January 2021, 8,000 print copies were sold during its first week of release. NPD BookScan reported in February 2021 that more than 21,000 copies have been sold in print. Ho was pregnant with a girl and had a two-year-old son while she was working on the first draft. She is a vice principal at a high school. Ho said, "Ultimately, this isn’t just a story about physical appearances, but a story of how appearances are passed down and what they can represent: family, history, culture, relationships, love." The book's editor Clarissa Wong said that she wished she had the book when she was a child and that she did not accept her eyes until she was in her early 20s. Wong said that the book is for every audience with what it means to be beautiful and that "it was one of the books I acquired the quickest, from it hitting my inbox to bringing it to acquisition and making an offer". Ho previously received a rejection every so often while her agent advised Ho to continue her positivity. A sequel titled Eyes That Speak to the Stars was published on February 15, 2022.

== Reception ==
Eyes That Kiss in the Corners is a New York Times and IndieBound best seller.

The book was generally well-received by critics, including starred reviews from Booklist, Kirkus Reviews, and School Library Journal.

Lydia Mulvany, writing for Booklist, said, "The writing, enhanced by warm, bold illustrations, is a powerful exercise in learning to see beauty in what’s different." Kirkus Reviews wrote, "This tale of self-acceptance and respect for one’s roots is breathtaking." Mary Lanni concluded in the School Library Journal that the text and illustrations in Eyes That Kiss in the Corners are "expertly paired" and "amplify each other superbly."

Michael Genhart of the New York Journal of Books said, "A gorgeous book with an inspiring point of view: treasure your uniqueness, your relationships, and your place in the world." Publishers Weekly called the book "a poignant testament to familial love and legacy."

Kirkus Reviews named Eyes That Kiss in the Corners one of the best children's books of 2021.

Awards and honors for Eyes That Kiss in the Corners
Year	Award/Honor	Result	Ref.
2021	Goodreads Choice Award for Best Middle Grade & Children's	Nominee	
2022	ALSC's Notable Children's Books	Selection	
2022	Rise: A Feminist Book Project	Selection	
2022	SCBWI Golden Kite Award for Picture Book Text	Winner	
