= So Totally Emily Ebers =

Book by Lisa Yee

- Cover of So Totally Emily Ebers
- Author: Lisa Yee
- Language: English
- Genre: Contemporary Fiction/Coming of Age
- Publisher: Arthur A. Levine Books
- Publication date: April 1, 2007
- Publication place: United States
- Media type: Print (Hardcover)
- Pages: 304
- ISBN: 0-439-83847-9
- OCLC: 70292102
- LC Class: PZ7.Y3638 So 2007

So Totally Emily Ebers is Lisa Yee's third novel. It tells Emily Ebers's side of the story in Stanford Wong Flunks Big-Time and Millicent Min, Girl Genius.

== Plot ==
Emily Ebers moved from Allendale, New Jersey, to Rancho Rosetta, California, with her mother, Alice, a journalist, following her parents' divorce. The relocation required selling Emily's home. Emily chose to live with Alice rather than her father, whose band, Talky Boys, was touring the East Coast.

Just when her summer looked like it couldn't get any worse, Emily is signed up for volleyball by Alice. During these torture sessions, Emily must learn to hit the ball over the net, live with the awful Coach Gowin, and endure and reflect insults from popular girl, Julie and her "back-up singers."

However, in a twist of fate, she meets Millicent Min, a home-schooled Chinese girl who was forced to play volleyball because there wasn't a gym at home. Surprisingly, Millie and Emily become best friends instantly, and Millie even goes to Emily's for a sleepover. But here's where the problem arises- is it possible for Alice to dematerialize so that her ugly hippie clothing and boring talk about journalism doesn't embarrass Emily? Luckily, Millie fakes interest in Alice and is safely whisked off to Emily's room before Alice can drone on about her newest articles.

After this sleepover, everything gets even better for Emily. First, she meets the other Mins- Mr. and Mrs. Min and Grandma Maddie- who are actually normal humans, unlike Alice. Then, she meets the boy of her dreams- Stanford Wong, who is athletic, smart, and handsome. He's the only seventh grader on the A-team for basketball, Millie's tutor, and someone that would "never do anything to hurt anyone."

Emily's life is now back to normal, and even volleyball isn't so excruciating as it first was now that she has Millie. However, everything she didn't give a second thought about now comes back to her- why Millie used large words and carried a briefcase, why she was so uncomfortable talking about school, and why another girl on the volleyball team calls her a "genius". During the morning of a sleepover at Millie's, Emily uncovers everything she needs to know to fit the pieces of the puzzle together- trophies, plaques, certificates, diplomas, and newspaper articles labeled 'Millicent Min'. She realizes that Millicent isn't stupid, homeschooled, or tutored by Stanford Wong. She is a genius, whereas Stanford Wong is failing language arts. "Best friends don't lie to each other," she thinks. How could they have lied to her the entire time?

Disgusted with her "friends," Emily decides to start anew and find real buddies who won't lie to her. First, she decides to become closer to Wendy, the other nice girl in volleyball. Through Wendy, she learns about Julie and her back up singers- how they could either "make or break" Emily when she started school. Though she isn't the type to join the popular clique, Wendy encourages her to start school with a good reputation. Plus, being popular can't harm her, can it?

Thus, the two of them attend Julie's pedicure party (popular girls only) where Emily is encouraged to look at herself in a different way- that is, comparing themselves to ultra-thin models. Emily starts dieting (though she isn't fat) and plucking her eyebrows (though they aren't ugly). In this quest to find out who she really is, Emily is pressured to buy six identical purses, $112 each, for each of the six popular girls (Julie and her Triple A backup singers Alyssa, Ariel, and Ariana, plus Emily and Wendy) with her dad's credit card. That day, Emily not only spent $672 (plus tax), but also one of her final tokens of tolerance for the so-called popular clique.

Though Wendy is a nice girl, no one beats Millie's "deadpan sense of humor" and the way she always had something to talk about. The timing was always perfect for Millie and Emily. Luckily, it still is. In an awkward telephone conversation, the two former best friends decide to meet at the mall. Though it takes some time for Millie to figure out that she had not "sorely misjudged the dynamics" of their relationship, but rather misjudged Emily's ability to look beyond IQ, she does figure out that Emily was and will always be her friend despite the intellectual barrier that had caused Millie to be friendless in the first place.

With Millie back, Emily is able to face the fact that her dad is no father of the year. When he finally calls for the second time the entire summer, it's about the credit card, to "confirm the purchase of six [expensive] purses" and to tell Emily to stop using the credit card. Emily is heartbroken; she had believed that her father had been extremely busy with his band and that he still loved her very much. Fortunately, when the truth hits her, Millie is right next to her, handing her tissues. But that's not all that Millie does- she even asks for the makeover that Emily's always wanted to do to cheer Millie up.

Emily also finds out that Alice had turned down a prestigious assignment to Paris, just to be with her for the summer! After realizing her serious error, Emily apologizes to her mother, saying, "I'm so sorry,...about this summer and life and everything. I've been so mean to you." Finally, after an entire summer, Emily is able to engage in an intimate relationship with her mother who she doesn't call "Alice" anymore, but "mom"- short, sweet, and daughterly.

After Millie's perfect definition of "true friend" in that noble act, Emily is able to break her bonds with Julie and the Triple A's. "I may have been slow, but I finally figured out what a true friend is, and Julie never was one," she declares. When Julie attempts to persuade Emily that what she has been doing for Emily is all for Emily's own good (e.g. the dieting), even meek Wendy sticks up for Emily. With one more true friend, Julie can't break her in school. That's another problem solved and just one more to go.

Although Stanford called almost every day, he never said anything or left a message. He never apologized, and Emily thinks it's because he never liked her. However, several days before summer vacation ends, the two make it up to each other. In an ice cream shop, Emily kisses Stanford on the cheek and they become boyfriend and girlfriend.

And finally, with a sweet letter to her father, Emily completes her diary. She is finally "home", as wise old Maddie says.

== Reception ==
Kirkus Reviews predicted that the reader might feel the repetitive nature of the narrative and wished that Yee would move on from Emily's story despite it being "both touching and amusing."
