= James Cross Giblin =

American children's author and editor (1933–2016)

James Cross Giblin (July 8, 1933 – April 10, 2016) was an American children's author and editor. He won a Golden Kite Award and the Sibert Medal.

== Life ==
Giblin was born on July 8, 1933, in Cleveland, and was raised in Painesville, Ohio. He graduated from Western Reserve University with a BA in drama, and went on to receive a master's in playwriting from Columbia University. After a brief period as an actor, he went to work in publishing, first for Criterion Books, later for Lothrop, Lee & Shepard; and Seabury Press. While at Seabury he founded a children's imprint, Clarion Books, which was later acquired by Houghton Mifflin. At Clarion he edited such notable children's book authors as Eileen Christelow, the author and illustrator of the "Five Little Monkeys" series; and Mary Downing Hahn, who wrote ghost stories for middle graders.

In 2003, he received the Sibert Medal for his book The Life and Death of Adolf Hitler.

== Works ==
- Chimney Sweeps: Yesterday and Today, Thomas Y. Crowell, 1982, illustrated by Margaret Tomes (winner of an American Book Award)
- Walls: Defenses Throughout History, Little, Brown & Co., 1984
- Milk: The Fight for Purity, Thomas Y. Crowell, 1986
- From Hand to Mouth: or, How We Invented Knives, Forks, Spoons, and Chopsticks, and the Table Manners to Go With Them, HarperCollins Publishers, 1987
- Let There Be Light: A Book About Windows, Thomas Y. Crowell, 1988
- Be Seated: A Book About Chairs, HarperCollins Children's Books, 1993
- When Plague Strikes: The Black Death, Smallpox, AIDS, HarperCollins Publishers, 1995, illustrated by David Frampton
- Charles A. Lindbergh: A Human Hero, Clarion Books, 1997
- The Life and Death of Adolf Hitler, Clarion Books, 2002 (Winner of the Robert F. Silbert Medal from the American Library Association)
- Good Brother, Bad Brother: The Story of Edwin Booth and John Wilkes Booth, Clarion Books, 2005
- The Rise and Fall of Senator Joe McCarthy, Clarion Books, 2009
