= Caroline Scheaffer Arnold =

Nonfiction children's author

Caroline Arnold (née Scheaffer; born May 16, 1944) is an American author of 170 books for children as well as an artist and the illustrator of many of her books. Her books primarily cover nonfiction topics such as animals, dinosaurs, human history and culturally notable places. She writes for ages ranging from preschool to middle school.

Her first book, published in 1980, was Five Nests (EP Dutton). This illustrated picture book describes the parenting behaviors of five different species of birds. Later that same year she published Electric Fish (Morrow Junior Books). Since then she has published more than 160 books. Most of her books are colorfully illustrated nonfiction picture books about natural science and social science topics. Some books are board books for very young children, and some are chapter books for older readers. Her fiction books include My Friend From Outer Space (Franklin Watts, 1981); The Terrible Hodag (Harcourt Brace Jovanovich, 1989), The Terrible Hodag and the Animal Catchers (Boyds Mills Press, 2006), and Wiggle and Waggle (Charlesbridge, 2007).

Caroline Arnold’s books have been translated into German, Indonesian, Korean, Japanese, and Spanish. She has won numerous awards for her writing.

== Life ==
Caroline Scheaffer Arnold was born in Pittsburgh, PA to Lester Scheaffer and Catherine Young Scheaffer, both social workers. At age four she moved with her family to Minneapolis, Minnesota, where she lived for the rest of her childhood. From 1948 to 1954 she lived at the North East Neighborhood House, the settlement house where her father worked as the director. This foundational period of her life inspired some of her writing, including Children of the Settlement Houses (Carolrhoda, 1998). During this period, Lester Scheaffer founded Camp Bovey for the youth of northeast Minneapolis. Arnold and her family spent summers at this camp, where they learned the local lore about a mythical creature called the Hodag. This inspired her storybooks The Terrible Hodag (1989) and The Terrible Hodag and the Animal Catchers (2006).

Caroline Arnold majored in art at Grinnell College graduating in 1966, and subsequently received a Master's degree in studio art from the University of Iowa. She started her writing career with the goal of illustrating her own books, but she grew to appreciate writing as a creative outlet and spends more time writing than illustrating. As of 2023 she has illustrated 21 published works with drawings and cut paper art, and illustrated four with photographs.

As a young adult, Arnold lived in New York City, NY; Yellow Springs, Ohio; and Millbrook, New York. In 1976 she moved to Los Angeles, where she lives with her husband, Arthur Arnold, a biologist at UCLA. She has two grown children.

== Career ==
She has worked numerous jobs, including:

- Freelance writer and artist. (1966 - current)
- Art teacher and substitute teacher in Yellow Springs and Xenia, OH (both 1968-69)
- New York Hospital, New York, NY, secretary (1969–70)
- Rockefeller University, New York, NY, laboratory assistant (1971–72)
- Art teacher and substitute teacher, Millbrook, NY (1972–76)
- University of California—Los Angeles, laboratory assistant (1976–79)
- University of California—Los Angeles Extension, instructor in Writers' Program (1982–2014).

== Collaborators ==
49 of Arnold's books were produced in collaboration with photographer Richard Hewett. Other collaborators include Mike Wallace, Robert Kruidener and her husband Arthur Arnold (photographers), and Madeline Comora and Herma Silverstein (co-authors).

== Education ==
- Kindergarten through 4th grade — Holland Elementary School, Minneapolis, MN (1949-1953)
- 4th grade through 6th grade—Windom Elementary School, Minneapolis, MN (1954-spring 1956)
- 7th grade through 9th grade—Ramsey Junior High (fall 1956 - spring 1959)
- 10th grade through 12th grade—Washburn High School (fall 1959 - spring 1962)
- BA from Grinnell College, Grinnell, IA (1962-1966)
- MA in Studio Art from the University of Iowa, Iowa City, IA (1968)
- Honorary D.H.L. (Doctorate of Humane Letters) from Grinnell College (2001)

== Awards ==
Caroline Arnold has been recognized for her body of work with the 2008 Leo Politi Golden Author Award from California Readers, and the 2005 Washington Post-Children's Book Guild Nonfiction Award. In addition, her books are frequently recognized with awards. Three of her books have been Notable Books from the American Library Association. Many of her books have been honored with awards from organizations such as the Children’s Book Council, the National Science Teacher’s Association, the California Reader’s Collection, National Council for the Social Studies/Children’s Book Council, and the Children’s Literature Council of Southern California.
