= Marianne J. Dyson =

American author of space science books

Marianne Jakmides Dyson is a writer of non-fiction books, mostly for children, about space science. She grew up in Canton, Ohio, lives in Houston and has worked for NASA.

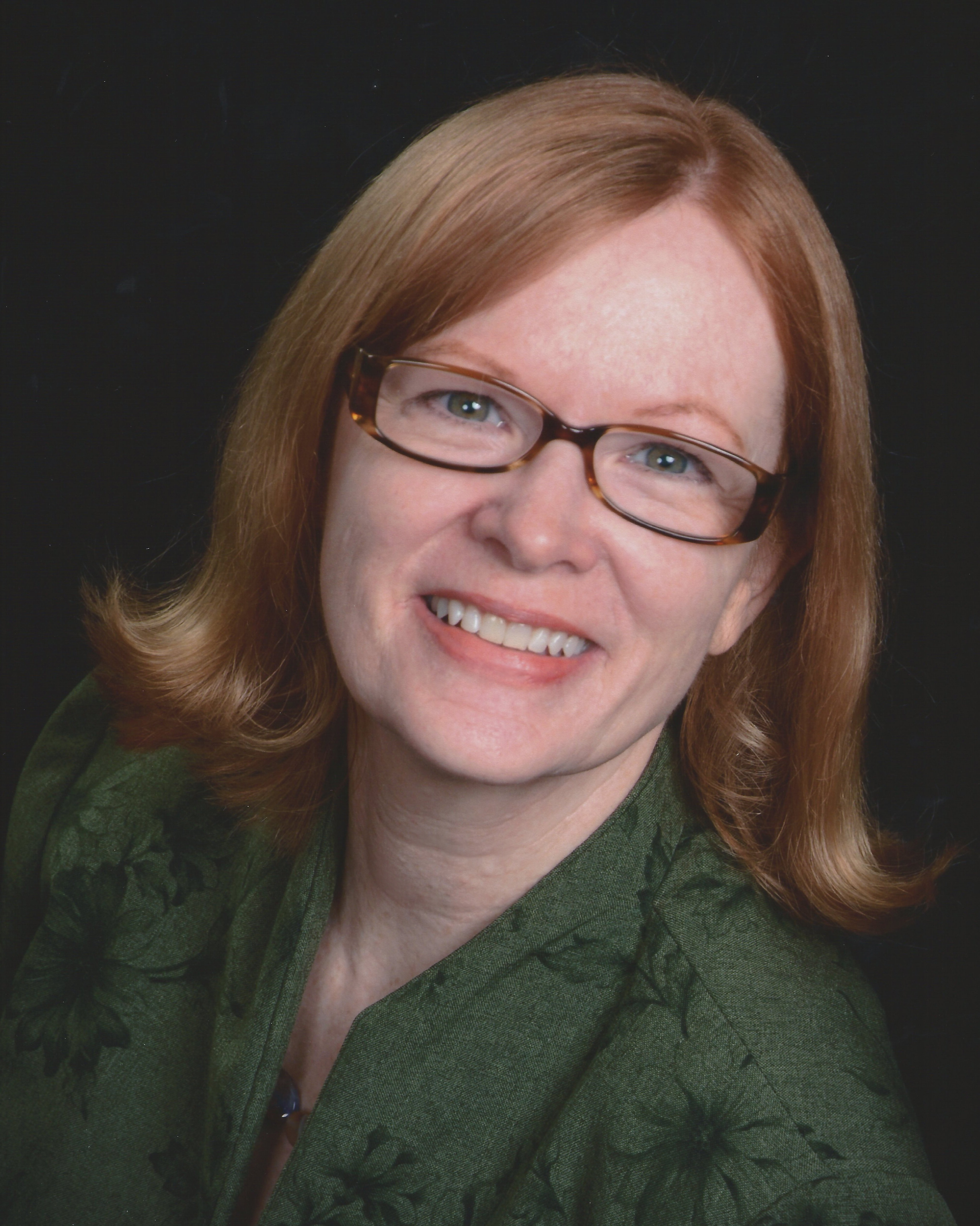
Head shot of Marianne J. Dyson

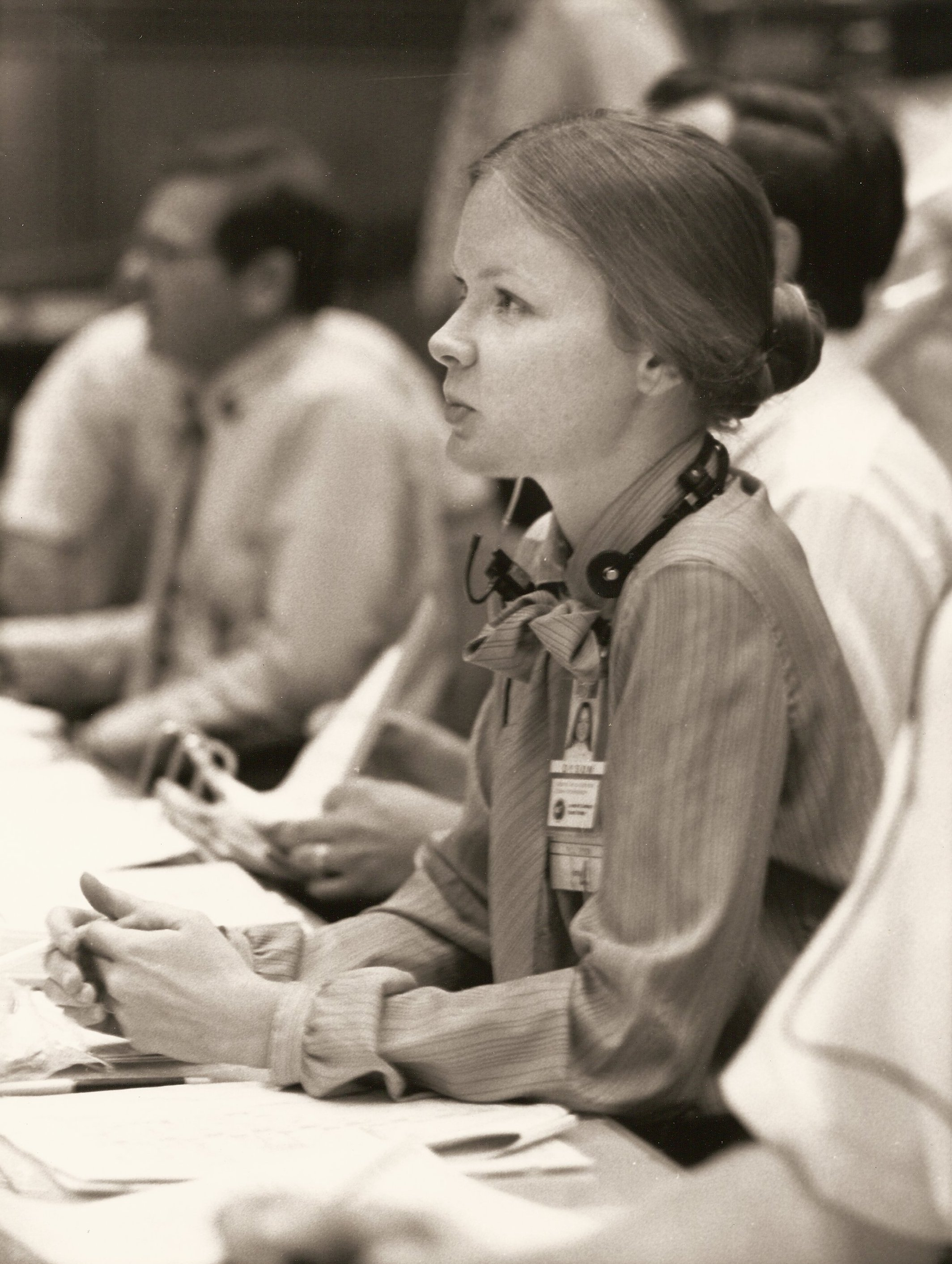
Flight Activities Officer Marianne J. Dyson, a member of the STS-4 Entry Team, on console in Mission Control at Johnson Space Center.

Her book Space Station Science: Life in Free Fall was a Golden Kite Award winner in the year 2000. Her book "Home on the Moon: Living on a Space Frontier" won the American Institute of Physics Science Communications Award in 2004. The first book she coauthored with Apollo 11 astronaut Buzz Aldrin, Welcome to Mars: Making a Home on the Red Planet, was named a Best STEM book by the National Science Teachers Association.

== Bibliography ==
- Fireworks in Orbit (Analog Science Fiction and Fact, 1990)
- The Critical Factor (Analog Science Fiction and Fact, 1992)
- The Shape of Things to Come (Analog Science Fiction and Fact, 1996)
- Finding Homework Help On The Internet (Scholastic, 2000)
- Home on the Moon: Living on a Space Frontier, ed. Jennifer Emmett (National Geographic, 2003)
- The Space Explorer's Guide to Out-Of-This-World Science with Hena Khan (2004)
- The Space Explorer's Guide to Stars and Galaxies (Scholastic, 2004)
- Space Station Science: Life In Free Fall foreword by Buzz Aldrin (Scholastic, 1999, 2nd ed. Windward, 2004)
- Twentieth-century Space And Astronomy: A History of Notable Research And Discovery, ed. William J. Cannon (Facts On File, 2007)
- Fly Me To The Moon (Analog Science Fiction and Fact, 2010)
- Dyson's Space Poems (2011)
- The Right Path and Zeus's Eagle (2011)
- Science Fiction Versus the Real Thing: What I learned on NASA's Vomit Comet (2012)
- The Callahan Kids: Tales of Life on Mars (Marianne J. Dyson, contributor) (2013)
- Fly Me to the Moon and Other Stories (2015)
- Welcome to Mars: Making a Home on the Red Planet by Buzz Aldrin and Marianne J. Dyson (National Geographic, 2015)
- Dyson, Marianne J. (2015). A passion for space: adventures of a pioneering female NASA Flight Controller. Springer. Bibcode:2016psap.book.....D.
- Dyson, Marianne (Jan–Feb 2015). "Space bugs". Probability Zero. Analog Science Fiction and Fact. 135 (1&2): 64–65.
- "To the Moon and Back: My Apollo 11 Adventure" by Buzz Aldrin and Marianne J. Dyson with art by Bruce Foster (National Geographic, 2018)
- Trajectories (Marianne J. Dyson, contributor), ed. Dave Creek
