= Stanford Wong Flunks Big-Time =

Book by Lisa Yee

- Author: Lisa Yee
- Language: English
- Genre: Contemporary fiction
- Published: October 1, 2005 Arthur A. Levine Books
- Publication place: United States
- Media type: Print
- Pages: 304 (hardcover)
- ISBN: 0-439-62247-6
- OCLC: 57452420
- LC Class: PZ7.Y3638 Sta 2005

Stanford Wong Flunks Big-Time is a 2005 children's novel by American author Lisa Yee. Narrating Stanford's point of view in Millicent Min, Girl Genius and So Totally Emily Ebers, it focuses on Stanford's eventful summer after he learns his lack of academic interest leads him to failing his English class and attending summer school. A basketball star, Stanford finds himself at odds at having to keep his summer school secret from his friends and teammates along with hiding the fact he's being tutored by the infamous Millicent Min. As Stanford struggles to deal with changes in his life, such as his grandmother leaving his home, the rest of the novel finds Stanford attempting to adapt to these changes along with dealing with problems involving friendship, family tensions, and first love.

== Plot summary ==
A slack-off, fun-loving, basketball prodigy, Stanford Wong is ready for summer. He's going to spend every day at the park with his best friends (Stretch, Gus, Tico, and Digger) and he's going to a basketball camp where he'll learn from the pros. But his English teacher, the horrible Mr. Glick, presents him with some bad news: he got an F on his last book report on Holes and failed English class. Now Stanford must trade basketball camp for summer school - and as if this weren't bad enough, his mom hired a tutor for him: his arch-enemy Millicent Min. A child genius, Millicent Min is a senior in high school at age eleven, not to mention a world-class jerk. She hates Stanford as much as he hates her.

Stanford's situation deteriorates as his father continues to distance himself from home, his grandmother becomes senile and moves to a dead retirement home, Millicent tortures him in their study sessions, and his lie to his friends becomes harder and harder to cover up - because he's told them that he passed English with flying colors.

Life improves slightly when the beautiful new girl, Emily Ebers, takes an immediate liking to Stanford (the feeling is mutual) but Emily is Millicent Min's one and only friend. Apparently, though, Millicent doesn't want Emily to know of her sky-high IQ, because Emily is under the impression that Millicent is not only homeschooled but tutored by Stanford. Stanford goes along with this lie because he believes that Emily will never like him if she knows he is stupid. In a strange way, Millicent and Stanford form a tentative friendship; they are bound by their affection for Emily, and in the process, the two become closer as well.

Soon, everything falls apart: Emily inadvertently discovers Stanford and Millicent's secret. She shuns them both, not because of their varying intelligence levels, but because they lied to her. A classmate and basketball player, Digger Ronster, knows what Stanford really got on his book report, and blackmails Stanford into purposely losing whenever they play basketball with the other guys. Stanford descends into depression because all of his lies have fallen through.

He is saved, though, when Emily forgives him. Also, Stanford doesn't have any more trouble with his friends because even though they know that Stanford lied about his English grade, they forgive him, too. Digger leaves Stanford alone after realizing that his blackmail no longer works. Millicent and Stanford make up after getting in a fight over Emily. Emily kisses Stanford on the cheek and the two start dating.

At the end of the story, Stanford's father reveals that he has been working so incredibly hard all the time because he was hoping for a promotion - which his boss granted him. However, the promotion required a relocation to New York. Stanford protests angrily, but his father tells him that he didn't take the job. He says that he just recently realized how distant he became from his family, and that wants to reconnect with them. Now that he had rejected the promotion, he says, he would probably have a lot more free time on his hands to spend with Stanford. The book ends with Stanford thinking, "I have so much to tell my dad." Later that night, he falls asleep wearing Alan Scott BK620s, which he always wanted the whole summer.

== Themes ==
According to Loretta Gaffney, who reviewed Stanford Wong Flunks Big-Time for The Bulletin of the Center for Children's Books, "Yee directly challenges stereotypes not only about Asian Americans but about boys and girls as well".

== Receptions ==
=== Reviews ===
Reviewers stated that Stanford Wong Flunks Big-Time provides a beneficial perspective missing from Millicent Min, Girl Genius, showing a more nuanced view of Stanford's character.

Reviewers also discussed the novel's humor. School Library Journal's Faith Brautigam found that Stanford's "observations on his overachieving father and sister can be hilarious". Conversely, according to Kirkus Reviews, while Stanford Wong Flunks Big-Time is "laced with humor", the protagonist's "voice is more regular" than Millicent's, meaning the novel "lack[s] the hilarious perspective of his socially clueless but intellectually gifted contemporary". Brautigam also stated that "the loving close-up of his grandmother's dementia is wonderfully drawn".

Kirkus Reviews further found that "parts of the story seem drawn out and not all of the complications are credible", though concluded that the story is "amusing, enjoyable and finally touching".

=== Awards ===
- ALSC Notable Children's Books (2006)
- CCBC Choice
- Chicago Public Library "Best of the Best"
- Chinese American Librarians Association Best Book Award for Youth
- Chicago Children's Best Book Choice Award
