= Kristy Dempsey =

American children's book author

Kristy Dempsey is a children's book author currently living in Belo Horizonte, Brazil. She won the 2015 Golden Kite Award for Picture Book Text for her book A Dance Like Starlight: One Ballerina's Dream.

== Early life and non-writing career ==
Dempsey was born in Lake City, South Carolina She lived in Gastonia, North Carolina, Statesville, North Carolina, Elizabethton, Tennessee, and Greenville, South Carolina as a child. She attended Furman University in Greenville. Later she lived in Carrollton, Georgia. In 1998 she moved to Belo Horizonte, Brazil.

Dempsey is a Middle School/High School/ Advanced Placement Language and Composition English Teacher and has been a school librarian. She teaches at the American School of Belo Horizonte.

== Publications ==
- Me With You (PreS-Grade 1) (Philomel 2009) ISBN 9780399250170
- Mini Racer (PreSchool-Grade1) ( Bloomsbury 2011) ISBN 978-1-59990-170-1
- Surfer Chick (Abrams 2012) ISBN 978-1419701887
- A Dance Like Starlight (Picture book. 3–7) (Philomel 2014) ISBN 978-0-399-25284-6
- Superhero Instruction Manual (Picture book. 4–8) (Knopf 2016) ISBN 978-0-385-75534-4
- Ten Little Toes, Two Small Feet (Picture book. 1–3) (Little Bee 2016) ISBN 978-1-4998-0236-8
- Ten Little Fingers, Two Small Hands (Picture book. 1–3) (Little Bee 2016) ISBN 978-1-4998-0229-0
- A Hop is Up (Picture book. 2–4) (Bloomsbury 2016) ISBN 978-1-61963-390-2
- Papa Put a Man on the Moon (Picture book. 6–8) (Dial Books 2019) ISBN 978-0-7352-3074-3

== Critical responses ==
A review of Papa Put a Man on the Moon in Publishers Weekly said:

Dempsey captures the girl’s palpable excitement as the Apollo 11 mission approaches ... In an author’s note, Dempsey offers historical context, explaining that the federal government hired factories to create the Apollo mission equipment and materials—and that the author’s own relatives made the fiberglass "Beta cloth" that was used in spacesuits.

A review of Papa Put a Man on the Moon in Kirkus Reviews said:

Though Dempsey looks back on family history in highlighting the small but significant contribution that her father and other workers in a South Carolina textile factory made by manufacturing one layer of spacesuit material, she holds off describing the technological feat or even placing it in historical context until her afterword. Instead, in all that comes before she mainly focuses on the admiration any child might feel for a hardworking dad.

Jasmine L. Precopio writing in School Library Journal said of Papa Put a Man on the Moon:

Told from the perspective of Marthanne, the daughter of a textile worker, this story seamlessly weaves together the excitement of the moon landing with the tale of the people who contributed to the historical event. ... A highly recommended purchase for any library, this book has a unique perspective on how every little piece works together to accomplish something great.

A starred review of A Dance Like Starlight in Kirkus Reviews said:

The skies over New York City are not clear enough to see the first star, the wishing star, and—more to the point—"Could a colored girl like me / ever become / a prima ballerina?" Then, one special night, the little girl and her mama attend a performance featuring Janet Collins, the first African-American dancer at the Met. Collins first danced there on November 13, 1951. Dempsey’s expressive free verse is full of longing and dreams, all in the very believable voice of a ballet-loving girl.

Barbara Auerbach writing in School Library Journal said of A Dance Like Starlight:

An African American girl from Harlem dreams of becoming a prima ballerina in this beautifully written narrative, which is also a tribute to Janet Collins, who, in 1951, was the "first colored prima ballerina" to perform at the Metropolitan Opera. ... Pair this title with Pam Muñoz Ryan and Brian Selznick's When Marian Sang (Scholastic, 2002), and use this poetic offering for units on black history or women's history.

Ann Kelley, in a starred review of A Dance Like Starlight in Booklist wrote:

It’s hard to find stars in the sky over New York City, which means it’s hard to wish on one. A young black girl living in Harlem in the 1950s has a big wish, though: to be a prima ballerina. ... Dempsey’s lyrical prose soars as it depicts one girl's dream—and her efforts to make that dream a reality.

Michelle Wardrip, writing in the Statesman Journal said of A Dance Like Starlight:

A story that is sure to win the hearts of young ballerinas everywhere. It gives young dancers the courage to follow their dreams no matter the obstacle.

Carolyn Eubanks, writing in the Petersburg, Virginia Progress-Index said of A Dance Like Starlight:

Little ballerinas have big dreams ... But in Harlem in the 1950s, those dreams don't always come true – they take a lot of work and a lot of hope.

A review of Superhero Instruction Manual in Kirkus Reviews said:

Told in a combination of comic-book frames, traditional picture-book spreads, and text boxes that contain directives from the titular manual, the book introduces readers to a young, white boy deeply absorbed in a "complete, unabridged" instruction manual that guarantees it can turn anyone super in "seven easy steps." ... This funny, spirited exploration of superhero culture sans violence and with an added dose of familial love is a powerful addition to any bookshelf.

A review of Ten Little Fingers, Two Small Hands in Kirkus Reviews said:

Counting from one to 10, the toddlers finish their snack (spilling some milk in the process, of course), but after 10 fingers clap in celebration…it’s time for more! ... There’s plenty of opportunity for interaction and cuddles as Dempsey encourages readers to "Count each finger one by one" and then kiss them when they’re done.

A review of A Hop is Up in Kirkus Reviews said:

Engaging art and attention to cadence and rhythm should make for a read-aloud winner.

A review of Ten Little Toes, Two Small Feet in Kirkus Reviews said:

Singsong verse and cuddly illustrations of round-faced toddlers characterize this picture book. ... Less a story than an album of pictures of a diverse array of barefoot toddlers, the simple text invites readers to look at young children in slice-of-life moments. The human diversity arises in depicted skin tone and hair texture...

Marge Loch-Wouters, writing in School Library Journal, said of Mini Racer:

An array of animals takes off in a race, ensconced in vehicles of every description, from a rainbow-wheeled wheelchair to tricked-out motorcycles and cars made of bananas, logs, carrots, or cheese. Bouncy rhymes curve along the race course as the critters speed, swerve, and careen around the serpentine country roads, encountering obstacles, crashes, and even having time for a swim.

Randall Enos, writing in Booklist said of Me with You:

In a beautiful country setting, a young female bear rhapsodizes to her grandfather about their special relationship.

Karen MacPherson, writing in the Pittsburgh Post-Gazette described Surfer Chick as "the comically inspiring tale of a gnarly new legend".
