= Joanna Ho =

Chinese-American author

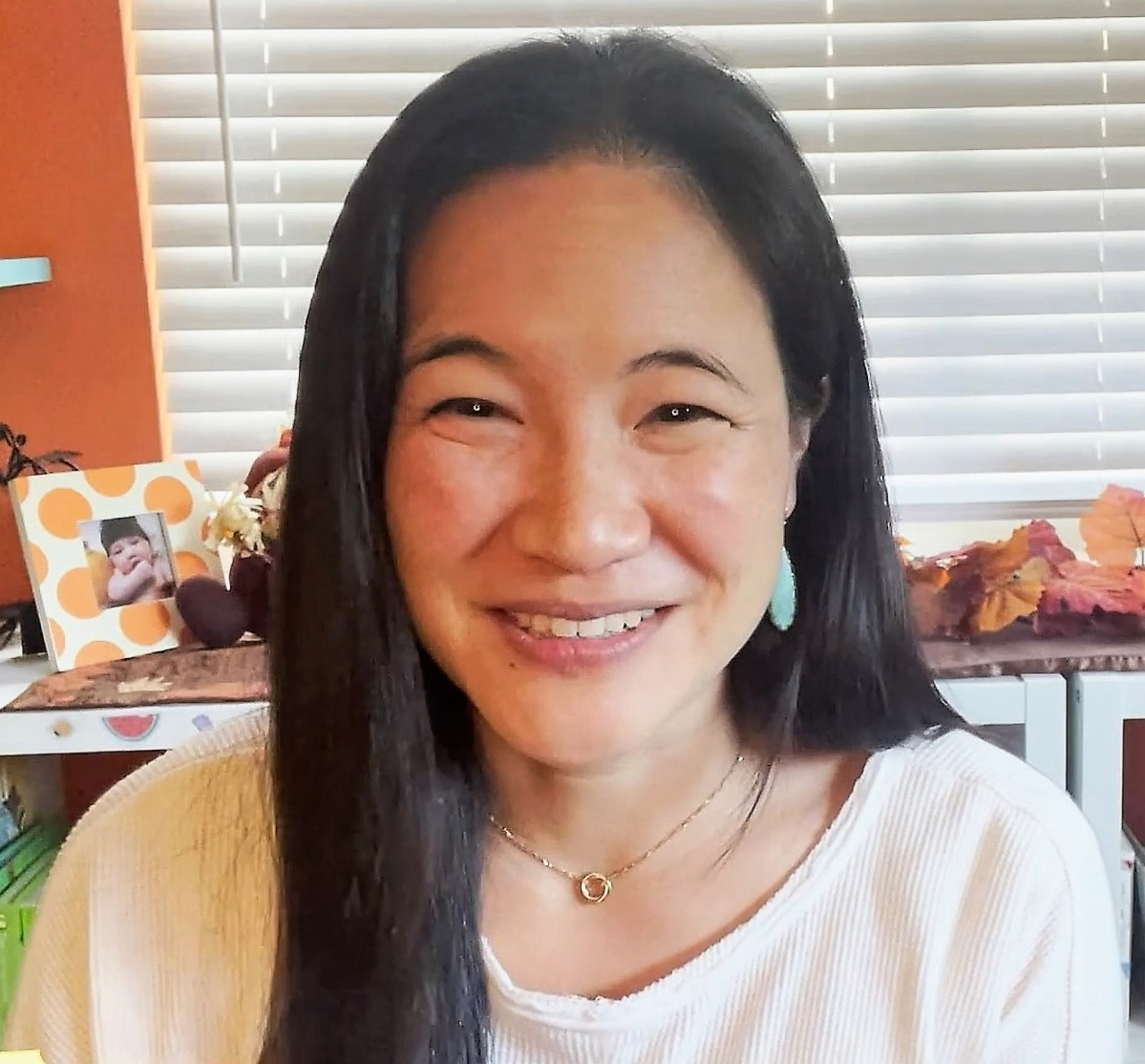
- Born: Saint Paul, Minnesota, United States
- Education: University of Pennsylvania; University of California, Berkeley
- Occupation: Author
- Notable work: Eyes That Kiss in the Corners
- Website: joannahowrites.com

Joanna Ho (Chinese: 何曉光 Hé Xiǎo-Guāng) is a Chinese-American author. She is best known for writing the 2021 picture book Eyes That Kiss in the Corners, a New York Times best seller. Her writing features themes of anti-racism and self-acceptance.

== Early life and education ==
Ho was born in Saint Paul, Minnesota, to immigrants from Taiwan and China. She grew up in Saint Paul, Baltimore, and the San Francisco Bay Area.

Ho earned a bachelor's degree in psychology from the University of Pennsylvania and a master's degree from the Principal Leadership Institute at the UC Berkeley School of Education. During her time in college, she lived in Ghana for a year, where she studied traditional dance.

== Career ==
Ho worked as an English teacher, later becoming vice principal of a San Francisco Bay Area high school. As a teacher, she sought to create a more equitable and inclusive educational experience for her students. After giving birth to her first child, she had difficulty finding picture books for him with diverse racial representation. This difficulty motivated Ho to begin writing picture books herself.

In 2021, HarperCollins published Ho's first book, Eyes That Kiss in the Corners, illustrated by Dung Ho (no relation). The picture book, featuring a Taiwanese-American girl who says her eyes "kiss in the corners and glow like warm tea," became a New York Times best seller and won a Golden Kite Award. In 2022, she published a companion book featuring a young Asian boy, Eyes that Speak to the Stars. Another companion book published in 2024, Eyes That Weave the World's Wonders, was co-authored by Liz SoHyeon Kleinrock, and addressed interracial adoption from the perspective of a girl from South Korea adopted by white Americans.

Ho continued exploring cultural identity in her 2023 picture book, Say My Name, where she gave her full Chinese name, 何曉光 Hé Xiǎo-Guāng, to one of the characters; and in a 2024 book about Asian-American history, We Who Produce Pearls: An Anthem for Asian America, with art by Amanda Phingbodhipakkiya. In 2022, Ho published her first young adult novel, The Silence That Binds Us, which was honored in the Asian/Pacific American Awards for Literature.

Ho co-hosts a podcast, Kidlit Happy Hour, with fellow author Caroline Kusin Pritchard. Ho and Kusin Pritchard co-authored the 2025 picture book The Day the Books Disappeared, which addresses book banning. While on tour to promote the book in October 2025, the authors were barred from a planned appearance at an elementary school when they refused a request from the San Ramon Valley Unified School District to omit mentions of book banning from their presentation.

== Personal life ==
Ho lives in the San Francisco Bay Area. She has three children.

== Selected bibliography ==
- Ho, Joanna (January 5, 2021). Eyes That Kiss in the Corners. Illustrated by Dung Ho. HarperCollins. ISBN 9780063082175.
- — (September 28, 2021). Playing at the Border: A Story of Yo-Yo Ma. Illustrated by Teresa Martinez. HarperCollins. ISBN 9780062994547.
- — (February 15, 2022). Eyes that Speak to the Stars. Illustrated by Dung Ho. HarperCollins. ISBN 9780063057753.
- — (June 14, 2022). The Silence that Binds Us. HarperCollins. ISBN 9780063059368.
- — (September 26, 2023). Say My Name. Illustrated by Khoa Le. HarperCollins. ISBN 9780063334359.
- — (October 31, 2023). On the Tip of a Wave: How Ai Weiwei's Art Is Changing the Tide. Illustrated by Catia Chien. Scholastic Incorporated. ISBN 9781338891225.
- Ho, Joanna; Kleinrock, Liz (January 23, 2024). Eyes That Weave the World's Wonders. Illustrated by Dung Ho. HarperCollins. ISBN 9780063384781.
- Ho, Joanna (April 16, 2024). We Who Produce Pearls: An Anthem for Asian America. Illustrated by Amanda Phingbodhipakkiya. Scholastic Incorporated. ISBN 9781338864618.
- Ho, Joanna; Pritchard, Caroline Kusin (July 15, 2025). The Day the Books Disappeared. Illustrated by Dan Santat. Disney Publishing Worldwide. ISBN 9781368110655.
