= Absolutely, Positively Not =

2005 novel by David LaRochelle

- Author: David LaRochelle
- Cover artist: Chip Kidd
- Language: English
- Genre: Realistic fiction
- Publisher: Arthur A. Levine Books
- Publication date: June 2005
- Publication place: United States
- Media type: Print (hardcover)
- Pages: 224
- ISBN: 978-0-439-59109-6
- OCLC: 56793600
- LC Class: PZ7.L3234 Ab 2005

Absolutely, Positively Not, also known as Absolutely, Positively Not Gay is the first novel by author David LaRochelle. The book centers on a 16-year-old homosexual boy, who struggles with his sexual feelings.

== Plot summary ==
Steven DeNarsky, a 16-year-old Superman fan, starts to develop sexual feelings for his substitute homeroom teacher, Mr. Bowman. Steven tries to reassure himself by buying such magazines like Playboy and the Victoria's Secret catalog, and dating several attractive girls. Unable to bottle his emotions any longer, he confesses to his friend, Rachel, that he is gay. To his surprise, Rachel and her entire family had previously assumed that Steven was gay, and already waited for him to tell her. Rachel urges Steven to create a gay/lesbian alliance club at their high school, but Steven is not optimistic about completely "coming out of the closet". Steven later does reveal that he is gay to both his parents, who don't think much of it. Steven eventually accepts his homosexuality by attending a teen gay/lesbian club, but mistakenly goes when it is specifically a lesbian meeting. Despite this, he has a good time and decides to embrace his homosexuality.

== Reception ==
The novel was well received by Booklist Review and School Library Journal. Absolutely, Positively Not, was the winner of the 2006 Sid Fleischman Humor Award.
