= Rhoda Blumberg =

American children's book author

Rhoda Blumberg (December 13, 1917 – June 6, 2016) was an American author of historical books for children.

== Early life ==
She was born Rhoda Shapiro in Brooklyn, New York on December 13, 1917. Her mother was a founder of the Mizrachi Women's Organization of America, a religious Zionist group, her father was in the garment business. She attended Girls High School in Brooklyn and took her bachelor's degree in philosophy from Adelphi College in 1937.

== Career and writing ==
In her early career she worked for CBS radio and did some magazine writing under the pen name of "Rhoda Roder." Blumberg began writing books in the 1960s, including First Travel Guide to the Moon and First Travel Guide to the Bottom of the Sea. She began writing historical books for children when she was in her mid-50s. All told she wrote over two dozen books. Her book Commodore Perry in the Land of the Shogun was the Newbery Honor book for literature from the Association for Library Service to Children in 1986. and the Boston Globe–Horn Book Award for 1985. She won the Golden Kite Award for non-fiction twice: in 1986 for Commodore Perry in the Land of the Shogun and again in 1988 for The Incredible Journey of Lewis and Clark.

== Selected bibliography ==
- Rhoda Blumberg (1985), Commodore Perry in the land of the Shogun, New York: Lothrop, Lee & Shepard Books, ISBN 0688037232, OCLC 11235753
- Rhoda Blumberg (2000), Shipwrecked!, New York: HarperCollins, ISBN 0688174841
- Rhoda Blumberg (1987), The incredible journey of Lewis and Clark, New York: Lothrop, Lee & Shepard Books, ISBN 0688065120, OCLC 15253037
- Rhoda Blumberg (1991), The remarkable voyages of Captain Cook, New York: Bradbury Press, ISBN 0027116824, OCLC 23768421
- Jumbo, Bradbury Press, 1993

== Personal life ==
She married attorney Gerald Blumberg (died 2009) in 1945. In 1951, they moved from Brooklyn, New York, to a small farm in Westchester County, where she lived the remainder of her life. They had one son and three daughters. She died on June 6, 2016, at her home in Yorktown Heights, N.Y.
