= Susie Hodge =

British writer and artist

Susie Hodge is a British author and artist who has written more than 100 books and many articles and web resources for both children and adults, within genres such as art history, practical art, history, design, science, religion and biography.

She was previously a copywriter at Saatchi & Saatchi and JWT. She has an MA in Art History from Birkbeck, University of London.

An experienced teacher, lecturer and speaker, she has given talks at various institutions on such diverse topics as Ancient Egyptian art, modern art, Impressionism, English landscape art, fashion design and J. M. W. Turner.

She lives in Westcliff-on-Sea, and is a Fellow of the Royal Society of Arts. Throughout the year she runs workshops and seminars for various creative institutions and has also appeared in TV documentaries that specialise in the arts and history.

== Bibliography ==
Works include:

- How to Survive Modern Art, 2009 - "readers of all ages should appreciate that the emphasis is not on “what” to think about art, but “how.”"
- Why Your Five-Year-Old Could Not Have Done That : Modern Art Explained, 2012 - "In its admirable lack of pretentious description, it is equally good reading for those seeking to understand how it is that in the world of modern art, the provocative can conquer the aesthetic."
- How Art Can Change Your Life, 2022
- Elements of Art: Ten Ways to Decode the Masterpieces, 2024

== See also ==
- List of non-fiction writers
- List of illustrators
- Children's non-fiction authors
