= Song of a Blackbird =

2025 graphic novel by Maria van Lieshout

- Author: Maria van Lieshout
- Publisher: First Second
- Publication date: 21 January 2025
- Pages: 256
- ISBN: 978-1-250-86981-4

Song of a Blackbird is a 2025 graphic novel by Maria van Lieshout. Set in alternating timelines in 1943 and 2011 in Amsterdam, the novel connects two girls, one of whom is researching her grandmother's ancestry and the other who is living through the Nazi occupation of the Netherlands.

== Reception ==
Song of a Blackbird was well received by critics, including starred reviews from Booklist, Kirkus Reviews, Publishers Weekly, and School Library Journal. Publishers Weekly named Songs of a Blackbird one of the best young adult books of 2025, and School Library Journal named it one of the year's best graphic novels.

Kirkus Reviews called the novel "powerful, moving, and utterly unforgettable", while School Library Journal's Cat Miserendino referred to is as "touching, gripping, and heartbreaking".

With its "limited palette of red, black, white, orange, and pale blue", the novel's art style has been compared to Marjane Satrapi’s Persepolis.

=== Accolades ===
Year	Award	Result	Ref.
2025	Golden Kite Award for Illustrated Book for Older Readers	Won	
2025	Golden Kite Award for Young Adult Fiction	Won	
2025	National Book Award for Young People's Literature	Longlisted	
2026	Michael L. Printz Award	Honored	
2026	Amelia Elizabeth Walden Award	Shortlisted	
2026	Great Graphic Novels for Teens	Top Ten	
