= Philip Wilkinson (author) =

Philip Wilkinson (born 1955) is the author of non-fiction books for children and adults. He was educated at Corpus Christi College, Oxford. He worked as an editor prior to becoming an author.

He specialises in works on history, the arts, religion, and architecture and has written over forty titles. Wilkinson wrote an important work on the Romans. He now lives in Gloucestershire.

== Selected works ==
- Amazing Buildings (1993)
- Building (1997)
- Illustrated Dictionary of Religions (1999)
- The Shock of the Old (2001)
- What the Romans Did For Us (2001)
- The Best-Ever Book of Ships (2002)
- The Kingfisher World Atlas (2003)
- Encyclopedia of Religion (with Rabbi Douglas Channing, 2004)
- Food and Farming: Feeding an Expanding World (Ideas & Inventions Series) (2005)
- Gandhi: The Young Protestor Who Founded a Nation (National Geographic World History Biographies) (2005)
- Gandhi (QED Great Lives Series) (2005)
- Generating Power (Ideas & Inventions Series) (2005)
- Life and D
- Yangtze (2005)
- The English Buildings Book (with Peter Ashley, 2006)
- English Abbeys: Monastic Buildings and Culture (2006)
- Religions (2008)
- 50 Architecture Ideas You Really Need To Know (2010)
- Ships: History, Battles, Discovery, Navigation
- Phantom Architecture (2017)

== See also ==
- List of children's non-fiction writers
