= Commodore Perry in the Land of the Shogun =

1985 children's book by Rhoda Blumberg

Commodore Perry in the Land of the Shogun is a 1985 children's book by Rhoda Blumberg. This large-format book tells the story of Commodore Perry and the Black Ships that coerced Japan into ending its policy of isolation by establishing commercial and diplomatic relationships with other nations in 1854. The book is illustrated with period prints. Two-thirds of the illustrations are by Japanese artists, the remainder by artists with the American fleet.

== Reception ==
Told from the perspective of the Americans involved, some reviewers criticized it for underplaying the military threat to Japan implicit in Perry's expedition, and ignoring the broader context of American expansionism. Others praised it for its evenhanded treatment of cultural misunderstanding; a Japanese guest on board one of the Black Shops drinks a glass of olive oil, but an American sailor ashore tastes and buys a bottle of Japanese hair oil thinking it is liquor. Noel Perrin praised the book for telling both sides, "how the Japanese looked to the Americans, but also how the Americans looked to the Japanese;" he called Blumberg's book, "irresistible."

== Awards ==
The book won the 1986 Golden Kite Award, the 1985 Boston Globe–Horn Book Award, and was named a 1986 Newbery Medal honor book.

== Details ==
Commodore Perry in the Land of the Shogun. New York : Lothrop, Lee & Shepard Books, 1985. 144 pages. ISBN 9780688037239
