= Eileen Christelow =

American writer

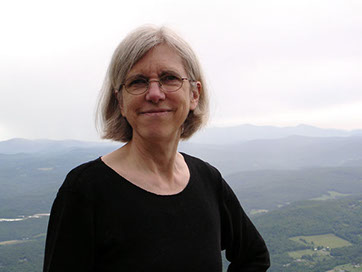
- Born: April 22, 1943 (age 83); Washington, DC, U.S.
- Occupations: Author, illustrator
- Writing career
- Genre: Juvenile fiction
- Notable work: Five Little Monkeys series
- Website: christelow.com

Eileen Christelow (born April 22, 1943) is an American writer and illustrator of children's books, both fiction and non-fiction. She is best known for her series about the Five Little Monkeys, starting with her retelling of the classic nursery rhyme "Five Little Monkeys Jumping on the Bed." Other notable books include stories set in her home state of Vermont; stories featuring Emma the Desperate Dog; and Vote!, a non-fiction work about the voting process.

== Biography ==
Christelow was born in Washington, DC to Allan Christelow, a historian and business executive, and Dorothy (Beal) Christelow, an economist. She grew up there and in New Canaan, Connecticut. Her father's job with the Standard Vacuum Oil Company took the family to Japan for a year, when she was 14 years old, and she spent her freshman year of high school at the American School in Japan, in Tokyo. Christelow completed her high school education at Abbot Academy, and graduated in 1965 from the University of Pennsylvania, where she studied architecture and learned the basic principles of design which would inform her later work in photography, graphic design, and illustration. She has one sibling, brother Allan Christelow, who is a specialist in the history of Islam in North and West Africa.

Christelow met her husband, Ahren Ahrenholz, while living in his native Philadelphia, and they married in 1965. She spent the next six years working as a freelance photographer, photographing architecture, inner-city street life, schools, and the political demonstrations of the 1960s. Her pictures were published in magazines and textbooks.

In 1971 the couple moved to Cornwall, England for a year, while Ahrenholz apprenticed to potter Michael Cardew. Their daughter, Heather, was born in Cornwall in March 1972.

In 1972 the family returned to the United States, settling in Kensington, California, where Ahrenholz opened Colusa Pottery. In 1981 they moved back east, to Vermont, where Christelow had spent childhood summers on her grandparents’ farm. They currently live in East Dummerston, Vermont, in a house designed and built by Christelow's husband.

== Career ==
Christelow worked as a freelance photographer and graphic designer before deciding to try her hand at writing and illustrating children's picture books. In between graphic design jobs, and while her young daughter, Heather, was at day care, Christelow worked on book ideas, creating dummies that she sent out to publisher after publisher. A course at the University of California’s extension program, “Writing for Children,” taught by former Harper & Row editor Betty Bacon, provided the feedback that Christelow needed to polish two of her book ideas into completed dummies.

Bacon suggested that Christelow show her books to Jim Giblin, at Clarion Books. She did so in August 1981, and Giblin bought both books, Henry and the Red Stripes, which was published in 1982, and Mr. Murphy’s Marvelous Invention, published in 1983. More than 30 books followed, with Giblin continuing as Christelow's editor until his death in 2016.

In addition to the Five Little Monkey series, Christelow's books include stories inspired by her dog, Emma, who died in 2013; they include Letters from a Desperate Dog and The Desperate Dog Writes Again. Other stories, including The Five-Dog Night and The Great Pig Escape, were inspired by true stories, and feature the culture and landscape of Christelow's native state of Vermont. Non-fiction titles include What Do Authors Do?, What Do Illustrators Do? and Vote!

Several of the Monkey books have been translated into Spanish (published in bilingual English/Spanish editions) and Chinese.

The Robbery at the Diamond Dog Diner was adapted for the PBS children's series Reading Rainbow in 1988, where it was narrated by actor Peter Falk.

== Bibliography ==
- Henry and the Red Stripes, Clarion, 1982 (Wisconsin Golden Archer Award; Junior Library Guild Selection)
- Mr. Murphy’s Marvelous Invention, Clarion, 1983
- Henry and the Dragon, Clarion, 1984 (Pick of the Crop in Picture Books — Boston Globe; Junior Library Guild Selection)
- Jerome the Babysitter, Clarion, 1985 (Children's Choice — 1986)
- The Robbery at the Diamond Dog Diner, Clarion, 1986 (A Reading Rainbow Selection; Children's Choice — 1987)
- Olive and the Magic Hat, Clarion, 1987
- Jerome and the Witchcraft Kids, Clarion, 1988 (Junior Library Guild Selection)
- Five Little Monkeys Jumping on the Bed*, Clarion, 1989 (IRA/CBC Children's Choice)
- Glenda Feathers Casts a Spell, Clarion, 1990 (Junior Library Guild Selection)
- Five Little Monkeys Sitting in a Tree*, Clarion, 1991 (IRA/CBC Children's Choice — 1992)
- Gertrude, the Bulldog Detective, Clarion, 1992
- Five Little Monkeys Bake a Birthday Cake* (originally published as Don’t Wake Up Mama), Clarion, 1993 (IRA/CBC Children's Choice — 1993)
- The Five-Dog Night, Clarion, 1993 (Top 40 New England Children's Books — Yankee Magazine)
- The Great Pig Escape, Clarion, 1994 (Book Links “Salutes a Few Good Books”)
- What Do Authors Do?**, Clarion, 1995 (School Library Journal, starred review)
- Five Little Monkeys with Nothing to Do*, Clarion, 1996
- Not Until Christmas, Walter!, Clarion, 1997
- Jerome Camps Out, Clarion, 1998
- What Do Illustrators Do?**, Clarion, 1999 (School Library Journal, starred review; An ALA Notable Children's Book — 1999)
- Five Little Monkeys Wash the Car*, Clarion, 2000 (IRA/CBC Children's Choice — 2001)
- The Great Pig Search, Clarion, 2001 (Starred Review - School Library Journal — Best Picture Books of 2001)
- Where’s the Big Bad Wolf?, Clarion, 2002 (One of Smithsonian’s ‘Notable Books for Children’ — 2002; Gold Best Book Award, Oppenheim Toy Portfolio)
- Vote!, Clarion, 2003 (ALA Booklist, starred review)
- Five Little Monkeys Play Hide and Seek, Clarion, 2004
- Letters From a Desperate Dog, Clarion, 2006 (ALA Booklist; Bank Street College of Education — A Best Children's Book of the Year; IRA/CBC Children's Choice)
- Five Little Monkeys Go Shopping, Clarion, 2007
- The Desperate Dog Writes Again, Clarion, 2010 (A Junior Library Guild Selection)
- Five Little Monkeys Reading in Bed, Clarion, 2011
- Five Little Monkeys Jump in the Bath (board book original), Houghton Mifflin Harcourt, 2012
- Five Little Monkeys Trick-or-Treat, Clarion, 2013
- Robins! How They Grow Up, Clarion, 2017 (A Junior Library Guild Selection)
- Five Little Monkeys Look for Santa, Clarion, 2021

*Anthologized in Five Little Monkeys Storybook Treasury, Houghton Mifflin Harcourt, 2009

**Anthologized in What Do Authors and Illustrators Do?, Clarion/HMH Books, 2013
