= The Tempering =

1983 young adult novel by Gloria Skurzynski

- First edition
- Author: Gloria Skurzynski
- Language: English
- Genre: Novel
- Publisher: Clarion Books
- Publication date: 1983
- Publication place: United States
- Media type: Print (hardback)
- Pages: 198
- ISBN: 0-89919-152-5
- OCLC: 8532666

The Tempering is a young adult novel by the American writer Gloria Skurzynski set in 1911 in the fictional mill town of Canaan (a parallel to the author's hometown of Duquesne, Pennsylvania, just south of Pittsburgh on the Monongahela River).

It tells the story of Karl Kerner and his friends Jame and Andy as they come of age among the sounds and the smoke of a booming steel town peopled by a wide variety of immigrants.

In 1983 the novel won Golden Kite Award of the Society of Children's Book Writers and Illustrators and was chosen one of the Best Books for Young Adults by the American Library Association.
