= Peter Corey =

British writer, actor and comedian (1946–2019)

Peter Frederick George Corey (1946 – 10 April 2019) was a British writer, actor and comedian. Corey was the author of the Coping With children's book series. He also wrote scripts for television programmes and acted in dramas and soap operas.

== Early life ==
Peter Frederick George Corey was born in Walsall in the West Midlands in 1946. His father Arthur Cook was a gardener and his mother Grace worked for the local Police.

Whilst attending the Edward Shelley School in Walsall, he took part in a school play and this inspired him to become an actor. He trained at the Birmingham School of Speech Training and Dramatic Art from 1962 until 1965.

On leaving college his first job was with the Unicorn Children's Theatre, touring the north of England and Scotland, finally being based at the New Arts Theatre club in London. Due to the existence of the comedian Peter Cook, he changed his professional name to Peter Corey. He later changed his name by deed poll, having apparently become confused by having two surnames. After working in a number of repertory theatres, including Crewe for two years, he was appointed Young People's Theatre Director at The Connaught Theatre, Worthing. It was at Worthing where he first started writing plays. He then took a similar role at the Redgrave Theatre in Farnham, where he stayed for eight years.

In 1981 he played the famous comedian Tony Hancock in a TV play that he wrote himself for BBC2. He spent several years working with the Junior Television Workshop at Central (later Carlton) Television in Nottingham. This led to him writing TV scripts and books, including TV versions of his book series 'Coping with ..' which won several awards.

== Writing work ==
Corey began writing in the early 1970s and wrote over 40 stage plays. These included a musical adaptation of Spike Milligan's Badjelly the Witch.

Corey wrote at least 30 books, the most enduring (1989–2002) being his book series Coping With... which are designed to be useful, containing tips on how to 'Cope' with certain subjects as well as being amusing.

His other books included The A-Z of Absolutely Everything, The Life and Times of Cristóbal Colón; Columbus Exposed a semi-accurate biography of Christopher Columbus, Palace Hill the Book (A book version of the Palace Hill TV series) and The Number 73 annual (An annual of a TV series, 1985). He later wrote a book for the American market - "Running for the bus", as well as two titles for the Oxford University Press reading scheme Project X. He also wrote a number of projects for learndirect including one entitled Where did the river go?, which is aimed at adults and children with reading and numeracy issues.

Corey's Coping With Books have been transformed into a number of television shows, starting as a one-off called "Coping with Grown-Ups" in 1994, followed by "Coping with Christmas" in 1995 as well as a six-part series; (Holidays, School, Cool, Relatives, Girls, Boys) broadcast over the 1997–1998 Christmas holiday.

Corey wrote approximately 200 hours of television, mostly for children. Among these have been several comedies, including: Your Mother Wouldn't Like It, Palace Hill, The Comedy Crowd and Cue Gary.

== Acting work ==
Corey was also an actor, featuring in dramas and soap operas on British television. He worked on camera with numerous comedians including Frank Skinner, Steve Coogan, Jack Dee and Richard Blackwood.

On British television in Brookside, he played "Freddie Spence" for two years. He also featured in EastEnders for six months playing "Vic the Crusher", who was an extortionist. Corey also played Mr. Prout in an early episode of One Foot in the Grave. His other roles included London's Burning, Hornblower, Harry's Mad, Sooty Heights, The Bill and No Sweat.

== Later work ==
In later life Corey continued to act and write, as well as touring the world talking about his work and providing writing and acting workshops. He also worked as a stand-up comedian. He has worked extensively with learndirect as a writer and contributed titles to OUP's new reading scheme Project X. In 2009 he wrote a book for Qatar's National Day celebrations called The Pearl.

== Personal life and death ==
Corey was married and divorced twice and had five children. He died in Westgate-on-Sea on 10 April 2019, at the age of 72.

== Awards ==
His Coping With... series which led to the creation of eight TV programmes helped Corey win four BAFTAs, the Prix Jeunesse, a Writers Guild award and a Bronze Apple.

== Books ==
- Coping With Parents (1989, ISBN 0-590-76140-4)
- Coping With Teachers (1991, ISBN 0-590-76485-3)
- Coping With Girls/Boys (co-written with Kara May) (1992, ISBN 0-590-55044-6)
- Coping With School (1993, ISBN 0-590-55279-1)
- Coping With The Family (1994, ISBN 0-590-55524-3)
- Coping With Pets (1995, ISBN 0-590-55838-2)
- Coping With Friends (1996, ISBN 0-590-13183-4)
- Coping With Love (1997, ISBN 0-590-13446-9)
- Coping With Exams and Tests (1998, ISBN 0-590-19683-9)
- Coping With The 21st Century (1999, ISBN 0-590-11192-2)
- Coping With Christmas (1999, ISBN 0-439-01187-6)
- Coping With Cash (2000, ISBN 0-439-01015-2)
- Coping With 1999 (a diary)

== See also ==
- List of children's non-fiction writers
