= Gail Hennessey =

Gail Ellen Skroback Hennessey (born June 28, 1951) taught social studies at Harpursville Central School in New York State. She is the author of children's books as well as eight publications for teachers and students. In 1988, she was named Outstanding Elementary Social Studies Classroom Teacher of the Year by the New York State Council for Social Studies. In the same year, the National Council for Social Studies also named her Outstanding Elementary Social Studies Teacher of the Year.

Gail has written monthly teaching guides for Cobblestone's Ladybug, Click, and Spider Magazines for many years, and has had some articles published in Instructor Magazine.

Currently, Gail writes for Aadarsh Publishing and has written over 30 books for their Purple Turtle series. After the success of the Purple Turtle books, a Purple Turtle animated series has also been created, with 52 episodes of 7 minutes each. The series was produced by Manish Rajoria and Ankita Shrivastava and co-produced with Telegael, Ireland, and Cyber Group Studios, France. The creative director of the show is Swati Rajoria.

Gail has written some picture books for Colour Fairies.

Gail's latest book of biographical plays on famous people in ancient history, Interviews with Ancient History, was published in 2016 by Social Studies School Service.

In 2020, Gail wrote for the series Old History, Mrs. Paddington and the Silver Mousetraps, and Fashion Rules, published by Red Chair Press.

== Books ==
Her books for teachers and young people include:

- Famous Crafty People (DOK) (out of print)
- Discovering Economics, Consumer Ed. for Kids (DOK) (out of print)
- Will the Real Notable Women Please Stand Up? (Cottonwood Press) (out of print)
- Will the Real Notable American Authors Please Stand Up? (Cottonwood Press) (out of print)
- Will the Real Paul Revere Please Stand Up? (and 14 other American History Plays) (Scholastic Professional Books) (out of print)
- Reader's Theater Scripts (Teacher Created Materials) (current)
- Will the Real Abraham Lincoln, Rosa Parks, Susan B. Anthony, Christopher Columbus, and Benjamin Franklin Please Stand Up? (out of print)
- To Tell the Truth Plays (by Social Studies School Service's Interact)
