= Philemon Sturges =

American architect and children's book writer

Philemon Fowler Sturges III
- Born: June 10, 1929; La Grande, Oregon
- Died: May 24, 2005 (aged 75)
- Education: Princeton University
- Occupation: Architect
- Practice: The Providence Partnership
- Buildings: Bonanza Bus Terminal
- Projects: The Post Office in Bristol, Rhode Island
- Design: Old Stone Bank

Philemon F. Sturges (June 10, 1929 – May 24, 2005) was a Rhode Island–based American architect and children's books author.

Philemon Fowler Sturges III was born June 10, 1929, in La Grande, Oregon. He was educated at Princeton University, earning a Bachelor's degree in 1952 and a Master's in 1955. After working for various architects he joined Lester J. Millman of Providence in 1963, forming the firm of Millman & Sturges. The partnership was expanded in 1969 to Millman, Sturges & Menard, but was dissolved in 1970. Sturges and Menard both joined a new firm, The Providence Partnership, remaining with them for many years.

Heralded for his Mid-Century Modern style, Sturges was often praised for his buildings' sensitivity to site and context. The Rhode Island Historical Preservation and Heritage Commission noted in their 1981 report that Sturges' Bonanza Bus Terminal was "one of the most handsome complexes erected as part of urban renewal in the 1960s; it is particularly well suited to its site and lends an urbane note to the streetscape." The complex was demolished soon afterward.

The Post Office in Bristol, Rhode Island was built on the site of a house designed by Rhode Island architect Russell Warren. The Post Office incorporated features salvaged from the demolished Warren building in its design. Also in Bristol, his Old Stone Bank building incorporates reliefs by Hugh Townley in the facade design.

Notable buildings include:

- Bonanza Bus Terminal (1963) 1 Sabin Street, Providence (demolished)
- US Post Office (1963) Hope Street, Bristol
- Old Stone Bank (1965) Hope Street, Bristol (now Citizens Bank)
- Providence Biltmore Hotel renovations (1979) 1 Dorrance Street, Providence

Sturges published his first book in 1995 and remained a prolific author until his death in 2005, publishing nearly one book per year. He is the author of HarperCollins' I Love... series, including I Love Trains, I Love Planes, I Love Trucks, I Love Tools, I Love Bugs, and I Love School.
