= Millicent Min, Girl Genius =

Book by Lisa Yee

- First edition
- Author: Lisa Yee
- Language: English Or Spanish (there are different versions.)
- Genre: Children's novel
- Publisher: Arthur A. Levine Books
- Publication date: October 1, 2003
- Publication place: United States
- Media type: Print
- Pages: 256 pp (hardcover)
- ISBN: 0-439-34257-0
- OCLC: 51009159
- LC Class: PZ7.H62964 Ki 2004

Millicent Min, Girl Genius is a 2003 children's novel by Lisa Yee. The author's first published book, it centers around a girl genius named Millicent Min who attends high school in the fictional town of Rancho Rosetta, California. Millicent, an 11-year-old genius, is disliked by her peers and fellow students. She must play volleyball and tutor her arch-enemy, Stanford Wong, who's flunking sixth grade. Millicent befriends Emily Ebers, a member of the volleyball team who has recently moved to California. Millicent believes that she must hide her intelligence from Emily to establish a lasting friendship, and lies frequently to Emily as a result. As the novel progresses, Millicent attempts to keep her secret from Emily while managing her relationship with Stanford, who befriends Emily as well. Millicent must also process various family matters.

In the companion books, Stanford Wong Flunks Big-Time and So Totally Emily Ebers, this situation is shown from the other children's points of view.

== Summary ==
Millicent Min has skipped five grades, has won third place at the National Math Bowl, has appeared on Jeopardy, and been featured in PBS specials and TIME Magazine; now, she is looking forward to becoming senior valedictorian and earning a scholarship to an Ivy League university- at age 11. Despite her young age, the socially inept Millicent has already completed 11th grade and is anticipating a summer of taking a college poetry course. However, Millicent's mother unexpectedly signs Millicent up for volleyball and assigns her a job tutoring Stanford Wong, a basketball player, in an effort to improve her social skills. In addition, Millicent's grandmother Maddie, her best and only friend, is leaving for England to attend a feng shui academy.

In volleyball, Millicent expects to be ostracized by her peers for her intelligence once more when she befriends Emily, an outgoing girl who has recently moved from New Jersey. In order to maintain her friendship with Emily, her first friend, Millicent believes she must hide her high IQ and pretend that she is home-schooled. She fears that Emily will treat her just like everyone else has if she learns that Millicent is a genius. When Emily finds Millicent and Stanford in the library at one of their tutoring sessions, Millicent acts as the failing student and treats Stanford as the genius.

Stanford agrees to pretend to be the tutor, as Stanford develops a crush on Emily, and out of a need to impress her, acts smart, believing that it is the only reason that Emily likes him. Both Stanford's and Millicent's lying to Emily bond them together helping them develop a friendly relationship.

One night, during a sleepover at Millicent's house, Emily finds out that Millicent is actually a genius when she discovers her hidden awards. Angry that Millicent had been hiding all this from her, she storms out of the house, breaking off their friendship. Emily even rejects Stanford after figuring out that he has also taken part in lying to Emily.

On top of all this, Millicent is also having problems at home. Her father is jobless, and her mother is showing symptoms of a potentially fatal brain tumor.

Eventually, after Millicent begins to come to terms with the problem and faces Emily, they quickly reconcile and become friends again after a few sincere apologies. After attending a Labor Day Fiesta, Millicent is also able to make amends with Stanford, who was able to pass his English class after all. As the end of summer approaches, Millicent says goodbye to her Grandmother at the airport and discovers her dad has received a job at RadioShack. Millicent is also able to learn that her mother is not sick but pregnant with her future sibling. As the final day of summer concludes, it's also revealed that Maddie will be traveling back home to welcome her new grandchild as Millicent finally falls asleep, "too happy and sad and tired to even think."

== Awards and nominations ==
- Sid Fleischman Humor Award 2004
- Publishers Weekly Flying Start
- CCBC Choice
- Bank Street Book of the Year 2004
- International Reading Association Children's Choice
- 2005-2006 Texas Lone Star List Nominee
- The Young Hoosier Book Award Nominee
- Georgia Book Award Nominee
- Garden State Book Awards Nominee
- Pennsylvania Young Readers Choice Award Nominee
- Nevada Young Readers Award Nominee
- Nene Award Nominee (Hawaii)
- Insinglass Teen Award Nominee (New Hampshire)
- Young Reader's Choice Award Nominee - Pacific Northwest Library Association
- South Carolina Junior Book Award Nominee
