= Helen Roney Sattler =

American children's author

- Born: Helen Elizabeth Roney; March 2, 1921 Newton, Iowa, United States
- Died: June 2, 1992 (aged 71) Bartlesville, Oklahoma, United States
- Occupation: Writer
- Education: Southwest Missouri State College
- Genre: Children's literature
- Subject: Natural history, science and technology, arts and crafts, picture books, cookbooks
- Years active: 1970–1992
- Notable awards: Golden Kite Award; 1984 The Illustrated Dinosaur Dictionary
- Spouse: Robert Edward Sattler
- Children: 2

Helen Roney Sattler (March 2, 1921 – June 2, 1992) was an American children's author most famous for her award-winning books about dinosaurs.

Sattler was born in Newton, Iowa, and grew up on a farm in the Missouri Ozarks. She received a bachelor of science degree in education from Southwest Missouri State College in 1946. Sattler worked as an elementary school teacher and a children's librarian for eight years before pursuing a full-time writing career. The subject of Sattler's first books was arts and crafts; she also wrote several books of Bible puzzles and numerous articles in Christian children's magazines. She began to focus on natural history after receiving a request from her grandson to write a dinosaur book "that didn't have any mistakes in it." Her efforts culminated in Dinosaurs of North America (1981), the first of several acclaimed books about dinosaurs.

Sattler's dinosaur books were diligently researched: she utilized more than 150 references per book and consulted more than a dozen paleontologists. Dinosaurs of North America was followed by Sattler's most ambitious work, The Illustrated Dinosaur Dictionary, which took her nearly five years to research and write. In his foreword to this exhaustive reference work, John H. Ostrom called it "the most comprehensive book on dinosaurs for the nonscientist" to date. A fully revised and expanded edition was published in 1990 as The New Illustrated Dinosaur Dictionary. The Dinosaur Society, a nonprofit organization founded by Don Lessem in 1991, established the Sattler Award for "best juvenile dinosaur book." The first winner of this award was Dougal Dixon for his 1993 book Dougal Dixon's Dinosaurs.

Sattler married Robert Edward Sattler on September 30, 1950, in Springfield, Missouri, with whom she had two children. She was a member of the Society of Children's Book Writers and Illustrators and the American Association of University Women. She died on June 2, 1992, and is buried at Memorial Park Cemetery in Bartlesville, Oklahoma.

== Selected bibliography ==
Dinosaur books (all published by Lothrop, Lee & Shepard):

- Dinosaurs of North America (1981; introduction by John H. Ostrom; Golden Kite Honor Book, ALA Notable Children's Book, Boston Globe–Horn Honor Book)
- The Illustrated Dinosaur Dictionary (1983; foreword by John H. Ostrom; Golden Kite Award)
- Baby Dinosaurs (1984)
- Pterosaurs, the Flying Reptiles (1985)
- Tyrannosaurus Rex and Its Kin: The Mesozoic Monsters (1989; Oklahoma Book Award)
- Stegosaurs: The Solar-Powered Dinosaurs (1992)

Other subjects (published by Lothrop unless otherwise specified):

- Kitchen Carton Crafts (1970)
- Recipes for Art and Craft Materials (1973, 1987, 1994)
- Train Whistles: A Language in Code (1977, 1985)
- Sharks, the Super Fish (1985)
- Whales, the Nomads of the Sea (1987)
- Hominids: A Look Back at Our Ancestors (1988)
- The Book of Eagles (1989)
- Giraffes, the Sentinels of the Savannas (1990)
- The Earliest Americans (Clarion Books, 1993)
- The Book of North American Owls (Clarion Books, 1994)
- Our Patchwork Planet: The Story of Plate Tectonics (1995)
