= Lisa Yee =

American writer

- Born: August 27, 1959 (age 67); Los Angeles, California, U.S.
- Occupation: Author
- Website: lisayee.com

Lisa Yee (born August 27, 1959) is a Chinese American writer and the author of Millicent Min, Girl Genius (2003), Stanford Wong Flunks Big-Time (2005) and So Totally Emily Ebers (2007). The three books are a part of a trilogy, summarizing the three pre-teens' experiences in Rancho Rosetta in the summer. An additional book, Warp Speed (2011), was written. She has also written Good Luck Ivy! and a number of books for American Girl.

== Biography ==
Yee was born August 27, 1959, and was raised near Los Angeles. She attended Brightwood Elementary School and Alhambra High School. Yee was on her high school's debate team and was president of the honor society. As a student at the University of Southern California, Yee's majors were English and Humanities.

Yee is the co-owner and creative director of Magic Pencil Studios, a strategic creative company. She has written a newspaper column, TV commercials, menus and TV specials.

In 2007, Yee was chosen as the children's writer-in-residence at Thurber House in Columbus, Ohio.

== Awards ==
Millicent Min, Girl Genius won the 2004 Sid Fleischman Humor award, was selected for the IRA/CBC Children's Choice list, and was nominated for multiple state prizes. Stanford Wong Flunks Big Time was an ALA Notable Book.

== Selected works ==
- Maizy Chen's Last Chance. Random House, 2022.
