= Children's non-fiction literature =

Category of children's literature

Children's non-fiction literature (also called informational) is non-fiction written as children's literature, educating a young (typically pre-teen) audience about the world while oftentimes also seeking to entertain them in the process.

Generally books of this genre feature simpler words and ideas, as well as pictures. It is, however, a very broad genre, involving several of the same topics that can be encountered in normal nonfiction, including biographies, diaries, encyclopedias, handbooks, history and more of the like.

== See also ==
- Aventis Prize
- Sibert Medal
- List of children's non-fiction authors.
