= Russell Freedman =

American biographer and author (1929–2018)

Russell A. Freedman
- Born: October 11, 1929; San Francisco, California
- Died: March 16, 2018 (aged 88); New York City
- Education: San Jose State University
- Occupations: Biographer, author
- Writing career
- Notable work: Lincoln: A Photobiography
- Notable awards: Newbery Medal (1988)

Russell A. Freedman (October 11, 1929 – March 16, 2018) was an American biographer and the author of some 60 books for young readers. He may be best known for winning the 1988 Newbery Medal with his work Lincoln: A Photobiography, "one of only a handful of nonfiction books to win that prestigious children's literature award".

In addition to Lincoln: A Photobiography, Freedman received three Newbery Honor awards during his career for Eleanor Roosevelt: A Life of Discovery, The Wright Brothers: How They Invented the Airplane, and The Voice That Challenged a Nation: Marian Anderson and the Struggle for Equal Rights.

Freedman also received the Laura Ingalls Wilder Award (now known as the Children's Literature Legacy Award) and, in 2007, the National Humanities Medal —the highest civilian honor in the United States for contributions to the humanities. He was recognized "for his recounting of the history of our nation's struggle for liberty. With great insight and creativity, he has awakened young readers to our nation's ongoing quest for justice for all."

== Biography ==
Books were an important part of Freedman's life. His father, Louis, was the West Coast marketing director of the Macmillan Publishing Company and had been instrumental in selling Margaret Mitchell's Gone with the Wind to Hollywood. In a 1936 note to Louis, Mitchell wrote:

"Thanks so much for the marvelous job you did on the Coast. When I heard about the first ten thousand copies being sold, I nearly choked on my turkey sandwich, and Norman Berg (our Atlanta trade salesman) had to beat me on the back and revive me. I cannot tell you how much I appreciate all you and your office have done for my book."

As a result, Freedman grew up in a household where dinner guests included Mitchell and John Steinbeck, another Macmillan author. Freedman attended San Jose State University before transferring to the University of California, Berkeley.

After college, Freedman worked as a reporter for the Associated Press in San Francisco until the mid-1950s, when he moved to Manhattan to take a job in advertising. During this period, Freedman wrote his first book after reading an article about a blind teenage boy who invented a Braille typewriter. The book, Teenagers Who Made History, was published in 1961.

It was partly through Louis's help that Freedman got his break in children's nonfiction publishing. Many years later, Freedman evoked his father in his book about World War I, The War to End All Wars, which The New York Times praised as “movingly conveyed...sane, balanced history.” A photograph on page 133 of the book shows Louis, an American-born son of an immigrant Jewish family from Eastern Europe, at age sixteen. At age 16, Louis had run away from his prospective rabbinical training, lied about his age, and enlisted in the American military to fight in World War I.

Since the 1970s, Freedman lived on the Upper West Side of Manhattan, New York. He lived two floors below Jewish American novelist and children's book author Lore Segal (1928–2024), who was his friend and neighbor. Segal himself had a writing career spanning more than half a century.

Throughout his career, Freedman became known for his prose and thorough research. He was also known for his inviting book design, described as an “integration of words and images.” “[If such] elements now seem commonplace in youth nonfiction,” it was, according to NPR, “thanks to his influence.”

== Selected works ==
- Cowboys of the Wild West, 1985
- Lincoln: A Photobiography, 1987
- Indian Chiefs, 1987
- Buffalo Hunt, 1988
- Franklin Delano Roosevelt, 1990
- The Wright Brothers: How They Invented the Airplane, 1991
- An Indian Winter, 1992
- Eleanor Roosevelt: A Life of Discovery, 1993
- Kids at Work: Lewis Hine and the Crusade Against Child Labor, 1994
- Immigrant Kids, 1995
- The Life and Death of Crazy Horse, 1996
- Out of Darkness: The Story of Louis Braille, 1997
- Martha Graham: A Dancer's Life, 1998
- Babe Didrikson Zaharias: The Making of a Champion, 1999
- Give Me Liberty: The Story of The Declaration of Independence, 2000
- Children of the Wild West, 2000
- Marian Anderson and the Struggle for Equal Rights, 2004
- Children of the Great Depression, 2005
- The Adventures of Marco Polo, 2006
- Freedom Walkers: The Story of the Montgomery Bus Boycott, 2006
- Who Was First?: Discovering the Americas, 2007
- Washington at Valley Forge, 2008
- The War to End All Wars: World War I, 2010
- Lafayette and the American Revolution, 2010

== Awards ==
In 1998 Freedman received the Children's Literature Legacy Award from the professional children's librarians, which recognizes a living author or illustrator whose books, published in the United States, have made "a substantial and lasting contribution to literature for children". At the time it was awarded every three years.

He received one of the 2007 National Humanities Medals.

Freedman received the Carter G. Woodson Book Award in 2005 for The Voice that Challenged a Nation and in 2007 for Freedom Walkers.

=== Books ===
Source: Lincoln: A Photobiography

- Newbery Medal Winner – 1988
- Fairfax County Public Library Booklist Jefferson Cup – 1988
- William Allen White Children's Book Award Nominee – 1989–90
- ALA Notable Book and Best Book for Young Adults

Eleanor Roosevelt: A Life of Discovery

- Newbery Honor Book – 1994
- Jane Addams Children's Book Award Honor Book – 1994
- Boston Globe-Horn Book Award – 1994
- Golden Kite Award – 1993
- First Flora Stieglitz Straus Award – 1994
- William Allen White Children's Book Award Nominee – 1995–96
- Rebecca Caudill Young Reader's Book Award Nominee – 1996

The Wright Brothers: How They Invented the Airplane

- Newbery Honor Book – 1992
- Boston Globe-Horn Book Award – 1991
- Golden Kite Award – 1991
- Fairfax County Public Library Booklist Jefferson Cup – 1992
- William Allen White Children's Book Award Nominee – 1993–94

Franklin Delano Roosevelt

- Golden Kite Award – 1994
- Orbis Pictus Award – 1991
- Best of the Best: Children's Literature Award – 1993–94
- Fairfax County Public Library Booklist Jefferson Cup – 1991
- William Allen White Children's Book Award Nominee – 1992–93

Indian Chiefs

- William Allen White Children's Book Award Nominee – 1989–90
- ALA Notable Book and Best Book for Young Adults

Kids At Work: Lewis Hine and the Crusade Against Child Labor

- Jane Addams Children's Book Award Winner – 1995
- Golden Kite Award – 1994
- Parents Choice Award – 1994
- Orbis Pictus Honors Book – 1995
- William Allen White Children's Book Award Nominee – 1996–97
- Utah Children's Information Book Award Nominee – 1996–97

An Indian Winter

- Western Heritage Award – 1995

Children of the Wild West

- Boston Globe-Horn Book Award Nonfiction Honor Book – 1984

Buffalo Hunt

- Carter G. Woodson Book Award – 1989

The Life and Death of Crazy Horse

- Spur Award – Best Western Juvenile Fiction – 1996

Immigrant Kids

- ALA Notable Book

Getting Born

- New York Academy of Science Annual Children's Book Award Honorable Mention

The Voice that Challenged a Nation: Marian Anderson and the Struggle for Equal Rights

- Sibert Medal
