= Catia Chien =

Brazilian children's book illustrator

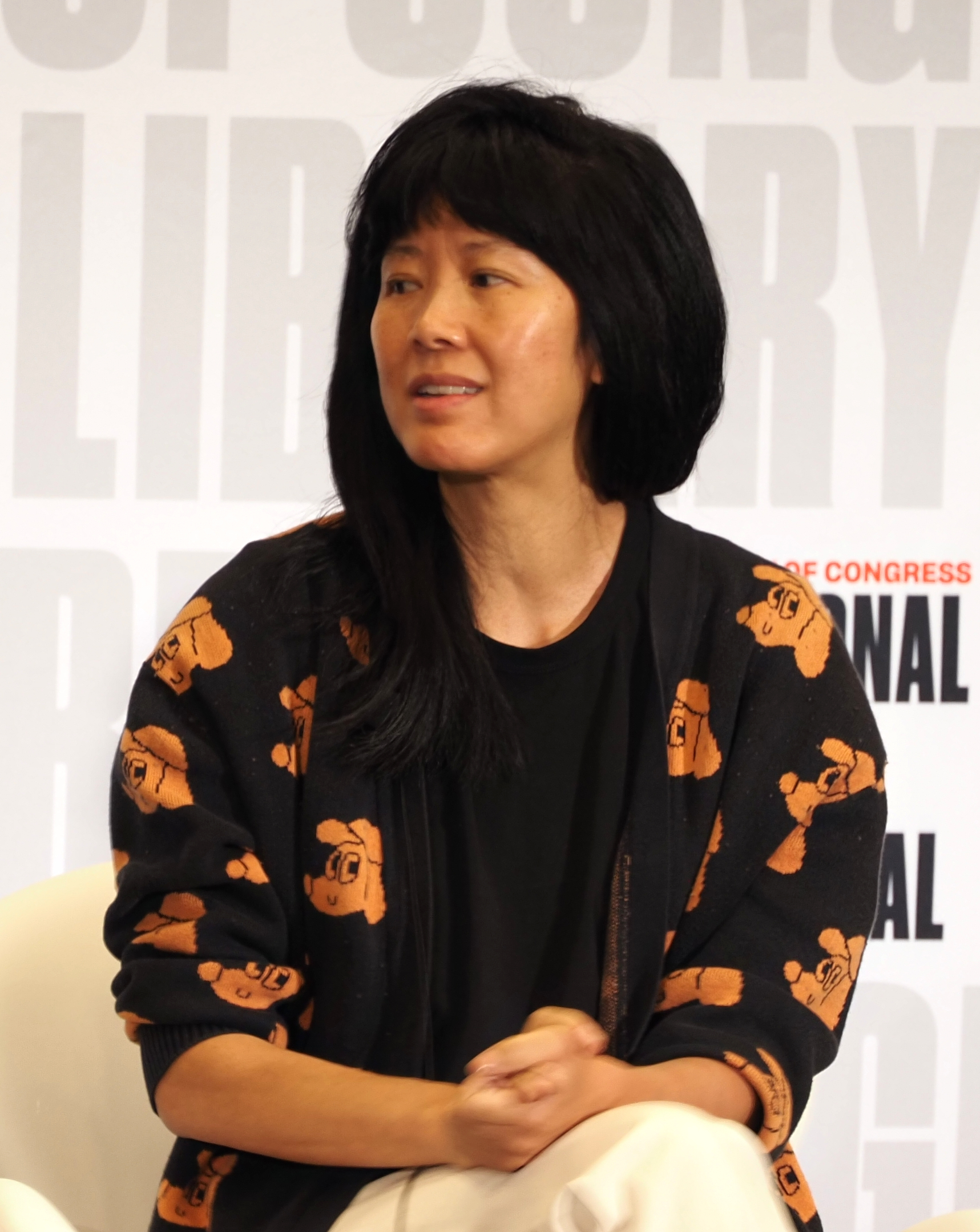
- Born: São Paulo, Brazil
- Education: Art Center College of Design
- Known for: Illustrator
- Website: www.catiachien.com

Catia Chien (Chinese: 簡嘉慧; pinyin: Jiǎn Jiāhuì) is a children's book illustrator from São Paulo, Brazil.

She is currently working in New York City.

== Biography ==
She graduated from the Art Center College of Design in Pasadena, California in 2004.

She has produced work for several publishing companies, including Random House, Penguin Books and Candlewick Press. She has won a gold medal from the Society of Illustrators in New York for her work in The Bear and The Moon and she has also won a gold medal from the Society of Illustrators in Los Angeles for her work in Sea Serpent and Me, written by Dashka Slater. Chien has also received a Schneider Family Book Award for her ALA notable book, A Boy and a Jaguar, written by Alan Rabinowitz. Chien received the 2026 Caldecott Medal for her work on Fireworks, written by Matthew Burgess.

Chien also works in visual development for animation. She has worked on films such as The Little Prince and Wish Dragon.

== Books ==
- A Lotus for You, written by Minh Le, Parallax, 2025 (ISBN 1952692288)
- Fireworks, written by Matthew Burgess, Harper Collins/Katherine Tegen Books, 2025 (ISBN 978-0063216723)
- All The Beating Hearts, written by Julie Fogliano, Neal Porter Books, 2023 (ISBN 9780823455201)
- On the Tip of a Wave: How Ai Weiwei's Art Is Changing the Tide, written by Joanna Ho, Scholastic, 2023 (ISBN 9781338715941)
- The Longest Letsgoboy, written by Derek Wilder, Chronicle Books, 2021 (ISBN 9781452177168)
- The Bear and the Moon, written by Matthew Burgess, Chronicle Books, 2020 (ISBN 9781452171913)
- The Town of Turtle, written by Michelle Cuevas, HMH Books for Young Readers, 2018 (ISBN 978-0544749825)
- Things to Do, written by Elaine Magliaro, Chronicle Books, 2017 (ISBN 978-1452111247)
- A Boy and a Jaguar, written by Alan Rabinowitz, HMH Books for Young Readers, 2014 (ISBN 978-0547875071)
- My Blue is Happy, written by Jessica Young, Candlewick, 2013 (ISBN 978-0763651251)
- The Sea Serpent and Me, written by Dashka Slater, HMH Books for Young Readers, 2008 (ISBN 978-0618723942)
- Princess Alyss of Wonderland, written by Frank Beddor, Dial, 2007 (ISBN 978-0803732513)
- Flight, Volume One, edited by Kazu Kibuishi and Catia Chien, Image Comics and Ballantine Books, 2007 (ISBN 978-0345496362)
