= Hyewon Yum =

South Korean Writer and Illustrator of Children's books

- Born: Seoul, South Korea
- Occupations: Author, illustrator
- Writing career
- Language: Korean, English
- Genre: Picture Books
- Website: hyewonyum.com hyewonbook.com

- Hyewon Yum
- Hangul: 염혜원
- RR: Yeom Hyewon
- MR: Yŏm Hyewŏn

Hyewon Yum (Korean: 염혜원) is a South Korean author and illustrator of several books for children, including Last Night, There Are No Scary Wolves, The Twins' Blanket, and Mom, It's My First Day of Kindergarten!. Yum has received the Ezra Jack Keats New Illustrator Award, a Charlotte Zolotow Award commendation, and other awards. Born and raised in South Korea, she currently lives in Brooklyn, New York.

== Biography ==
Hyewon Yum she studied illustration at the SVA (School of Visual Art) in New York. She published her first original picture book Last Night in 2009, which was also her SVA graduation project. For Last Night, Yum won a Bologna Ragazzi Award Honorable Mention for Fiction and the Golden Kite Award for Picture Book Illustration.

After graduating from the undergraduate and graduate programs at Seoul National University, followed by her studies at SVA, she published Last Night in 2009, which was translated and published in Korean, French, and Portuguese, and its follow-up, There Are No Scary Wolves, which was the 2010 winner of the Society of Illustrators' Founder's Award. The Twins' Blanket, published in 2011, was selected as one of the School Library Journal's Best Picture Books, Best Children's Books of the Year and Best Children's Books for Family Literacy. Mom, It's My First Day of Kindergarten! received an Ezra Jack Keats New Illustrator Award upon publication in 2013, Puddle won the APALA, and Saturday Is Swimming Day was named as a Charlotte Zolotow Award Honor Book. She has collaborated with artists E. Lockhart and Avery Corman.

== Activities ==
- 2012 In the Studio: An Exhibition Featuring Children's book Illustrations, Dr. M. T. Geoffrey Yeh Art Gallery
- 2011 Brooklyn Book Festival

== Awards ==
- 2020 Golden Kite Award - Clever Little Witch
- 2019 Charlotte Zolotow Award Honor –Saturday Is Swimming Day
- 2019 ALSC Notable Children's Books - Saturday Is Swimming Day
- 2017 CLEL Bell award - Puddle
- 2017 ALA Notable books – Puddle
- 2017 APALA – Puddle
- 2013 Ezra Jack Keats New Illustrator award - Mom, It's My First Day of Kindergarten!
- 2012 Best Children's Books for Family Literacy - The Twins' Blanket
- 2012 Best Children's Books of the Year - The Twins' Blanket
- 2011 School Library Journal's Best Picture Books - The Twins' Blanket
- 2010 Winner of the Society of Illustrators' Founder's Award – There are No Scary Wolves
- 2009 Winner of the Golden Kite Award – Last Night
- 2009 Fiction Honorable Mention for the Bologna Ragazzi award – Last Night

== Works ==
- 2022 Lion Needs a Shot (Harry N. Abrams) ISBN 978-1419748295
  - 2022 Korean edition 으르렁 소아과 (Changbi Publishers) ISBN 978-8936455859
- 2021Grandpa Across the Ocean (Harry N. Abrams) ISBN 978-1419742255
- 2020 Lion Needs a Haircut (Harry N. Abrams) ISBN 978-1419742248
  - 2022 Korean edition 으르렁 이발소 (Changbi Publishers) ISBN 978-8936447793
- 2018 Saturday Is Swimming Day (Candlewick) ISBN 978-0763691172
  - 2018 Korean edition 수영장 가는 날 (Changbi Publishers) ISBN 978-8936455286
  - 2019 Japanese edition プールのひは、おなかいたいひ (光村教育図書) ISBN 978-4895722407
- 2016 Puddle (Farrar, Straus and Giroux) ISBN 978-0374316952
  - 2016 Korean edition 물웅덩이로 참방! (Changbi Publishers) ISBN 978-8936446963
- 2014 The Twins' Little Sister (Farrar, Straus and Giroux) ISBN 978-0374379735
  - 2016 Korean edition 우리는 쌍둥이 언니 (Changbi Publishers) ISBN 978-8949112671
- 2013 This Is Our House (Square Fish) ISBN 978-1250865144
  - 2015 Chinese edition 这是我们的家 (Beijing United Publishing) ISBN 978-7550246584
- 2012 Mom, It's My First Day of Kindergarten! (Farrar, Straus and Giroux) ISBN 978-0374350048
  - 2012 Japanese edition ふたごのもうふ (Transview) ISBN 978-4798701219
  - 2013 Korean edition 야호! 오늘은 유치원 가는 날 (BIR Publishing) ISBN 978-8949112411
  - 2013 Spanish edition Mama Hoy Empiezo El Jardin De Infantes (La Brujita de Papel) ISBN 978-9873681165
  - 2015 Chinese edition 妈妈，今天是我第一天上学！ (Beijing United Publishing) ISBN 978-7550236523
- 2011 The Twins' Blanket (Square Fish) ISBN 978-1250825223
  - 2012 French edition Bonne nuit, les jumelles! (Albin Michel) ISBN 978-2226238771
  - 2012 Japanese edition ふたごのもうふ (Transview) ISBN 978-4798701219
  - 2014 Korean edition 쌍둥이는 너무 좋아 (BIR Publishing) ISBN 978-8949112480
  - 2015 Chinese edition 双胞胎的小被子 (Beijing United Publishing) ISBN 978-7550246577
- 2010 There Are No Scary Wolves (Farrar, Straus and Giroux) ISBN 978-0374380601
  - 2018 Chinese edition 门外没有大坏狼 (Twenty First Century Publications) ISBN 978-7539198231
- 2008 Last Night (Farrar, Straus and Giroux) ISBN 978-0374343583
  - 2011 Korean edition 어젯밤에 뭐했니? (BIR Publishing ISBN 978-8949112213
  - 2011 French edition Avec mon ours (Albin Michel) ISBN 978-2226218339
  - 2011 Portuguese edition Boa-Noite (Galera) ISBN 978-8501094025

=== Collaborations ===
- 2024 Not perfect by Maya Myers and Hyewon Yum (Neal Porter Books) ISBN 978-0823451708
- 2023 Night Song by Mk Smith Despres and Hyewon Yum (Enchanted Lion Books) ISBN 978-1592703944
- 2023 Sometimes I Kaploom (A Big Feelings Book) by Rachel Vail and Hyewon Yum (Orchard Books) ISBN 978-1338840308
- 2023 Ode to a Bad Day by Chelsea Lin Wallace and Hyewon Yum (Chronicle Books) ISBN 978-1797210803
  - 2023 Korean edition (Junior RHK) ISBN 978-8925576794
- 2023 Where I Live: Poems About My Home, My Street, and My Town by Paul B. Janeczko and Hyewon Yum (Candlewick) ISBN 978-1536200942
- 2022 Sometimes I Grumblesquinch (A Big Feelings Book) by Rachel Vail and Hyewon Yum (Orchard Books) ISBN 978-1338751161
- 2022 Asian Adventures AZ Foods: Delicious Asian Foods From AZby Yobe Qiu and Cynthia Li (By Yobe Qiu) ISBN 978-1957711065
- 2022 Luli and the Language of Tea by Andrea Wang and Hyewon Yum (Neal Porter Books) ISBN 978-0823446148
- 2021 Not Little by Maya Myers and Hyewon Yum (Neal Porter Books) ISBN 978-0823446193
  - 2023 Korean edition 작으면 뭐가 어때서 (BIR Publishing) ISBN 978-8949114354
  - 2023 Japanese edition おちびさんじゃないよ (Imagination Place) ISBN 978-4909809445
- 2021 The Happiness of a Dog with a Ball in Its Mouth by Bruce Handy and Hyewon Yum (Enchanted Lion Books) ISBN 978-1592703517
  - 2021 Spanish edition Felicidad de un perro con su pelota (Ediciones Akal) ISBN 978-8446051374
  - 2022 Korean edition 행복은 어디에나 있어 (Junior RHK) ISBN 978-8925578989
  - 2023 Brazilian edition Livro A alegria de um cachorro com uma bola na boca (Brinque-Book) ISBN 978-6556540375
- 2021 I Am a Bird by Hope Lim and Hyewon Yum (Candlewick) ISBN 978-1536208917
- 2019 Clever Little Witch by Muon Thi Van and Hyewon Yum (Margaret K. McElderry Books) ISBN 978-1481481717
- 2019 Bark in the Park!: Poems for Dog Lovers by Avery Corman and Hyewon Yum (Orchard Books) ISBN 978-1338118391
  - 2020 Korean edition 멍멍이는 멍멍이 (Changbi Publishers) ISBN 978-8936447687
- 2017 Someday, Narwhal by Lisa Mantchev and Hyewon Yum (Simon and Schuster/Paula Wiseman Books) ISBN 978-1481479707
- 2017 A Piece of Home by Jeri Watts and Hyewon Yum (Scholastic) ISBN 978-1338151961
- 2015 The Fun Book of Scary Stuff by Emily Jenkins and Hyewon Yum (Farrar, Straus and Giroux) ISBN 978-0374300005
  - 2017 Korean edition 너무너무 무서울 때 읽는 책 (Changbi Publishers) ISBN 978-8936455033
  - 2018 Chinese edition 装满可怕东西的有趣的书 (Twenty First Century Publications) ISBN 978-7556821068
- 2013 Hooray Parade by Barbara Joosse and Hyewon Yum (Viking Books for Young Readers) ISBN 978-0670013340
