= Photobiography =

Account of a person's life primarily presented through photographs

Photobiography is a "person's biography as revealed through photographs". This is a neologism that was used for the first time in the French language in Manifeste photobiographique (1983), written by Gilles Mora and co-written with Claude Nori.

Generally, the photobiography illustrate and tell the facts of life of famous people, such as Abraham Lincoln, Martin Luther King Jr., Albert Einstein, or Eleanor Roosevelt. Although photobiographical publications have been used for commercial purposes, several academics researches in France and in the United States "have been trying to redefine it since the end of the 1990s". Generally, photobiography tend to show more pictures than text, although some writers have combined these two practices in a same work, as with Denis Roche, who is also a photographer. In contrast with both techniques, there has been discussion of how photography can affect an autobiographical discourse. Roland Barthes, for example, in his Camera Lucida, suggests how photographs can fascinate the reader like no other images when he describes photography as a "pure deictic language".
