= Popular Paperbacks for Young Adults =

Annual book list

Popular Paperbacks for Young Adults was an annual list of popular books geared toward young adult readers, collated by the Young Adult Library Services Association (YALSA), which was published from 1988 to 2017. The aim of the list was "to encourage young adults to read for pleasure by presenting to them lists of popular or topical titles which are widely available in paperback and which represent a broad variety of accessible themes and genres". Unlike other lists published by the American Library Association and its subsidiaries, books on the list did not have to be published recently. Researchers, librarians, and educators have used the list to better understand books popular amongst young adults.

== History ==
YALSA first released the Popular Paperbacks for Young Adults list in 1988. Working with book distributor Baker & Taylor, representatives from YALSA reviewed books available in paperback in five genres: "romance, horror, science fiction, sports, and mystery". In following years, YALSA added more genres to the list (e.g., fantasy, humor, and historical fiction).

== Criteria ==
To be eligible for the list, books "must be in print and available in paperback", which ensures wider availability across socioeconomic statuses. The judges committee considers the opinions of young adult readers, looking at both young adult and adult books, both fiction and nonfiction. Furthermore, "Popularity is more important than literary quality."

== Recipients ==
Between 1997 and 2010, YALSA did not select the top ten books annually; instead, they composed longer lists in selected categories.

The top ten books for 2011 to 2017 are listed below.

Popular Paperbacks for Young Adults Top Ten (2011–2017)
Year	Author	Title
2011	M. T. Anderson	Burger Wuss
2011	Karen Kincy	Other
2011	Ryan Mecum	Zombie Haiku: Good Poetry for Your…Brains
2011	Campbell Ross	Shadoweyes
2011	Neal Shusterman	Unwind
2011	Cynthia Leitich Smith	Tantalize
2011	The Manga University Culinary Institute with Chihiro Hattori (illus.)	The Manga Cookbook
2011	Lynn Weingarten	Wherever Nina Lies
2011	Scott Westerfeld with Keith Thompson (illus.)	Leviathan
2011	Chris Wooding with Dan Chernett (ilus.)	Malice
2012	Holly Black and Cecil Castellucci (ed.)	Geektastic: Stories from the Nerd Herd
2012	Michael Carroll	Super Human
2012	Brian Falkner	Brain Jack
2012	Gail Giles	Shattering Glass
2012	Paige Harbison	Here Lies Bridget
2012	April Lindner	Jane
2012	Matthew Loux	SideScrollers
2012	Perry Moore	Hero
2012	Evonne Tsang	My Boyfriend is a Monster
2012	Heather Waldorf	Tripping
2013	Elizabeth Eulberg	Prom and Prejudice
2013	Maureen Johnson	Name of the Star
2013	E. Lockhart	The Disreputable History of Frankie Landau-Banks
2013	Jon Skovron	Struts and Frets
2013	Raina Telgemeier	Drama
2013	Donald Gallo	First Crossing:Stories about teen immigrants
2013	Brooke Hauser	The New Kids: big dreams and brave journeys at a high school forimmigrant teens
2013	Ally Carter	Heist Society
2013	Wendelin Van Draanen	The Running Dream
2013	Bil Wright	Putting Makeup on the Fat Boy
2014	Robin Benway	Audrey, Wait!
2014	Libba Bray	Beauty Queens
2014	Don Calame	Swim The Fly
2014	Brent Crawford	Carter Finally Gets It
2014	Kirstin Cronn-Mills	Beautiful Music for Ugly Children
2014	Malinda Lo	Ash
2014	Lish McBride	Hold Me Closer, Necromancer
2014	Ruta Sepetys	Between Shades Of Gray
2014	Tanya Lee Stone	Courage Has No Color: The True Story of the Triple Nickles: America'sFirst Black Paratroopers
2014	Gene Luen Yang	Boxers & Saints
2015	Derf Backderf	My Friend Dahmer
2015	Suzanne Collins	Catching Fire
2015	Jack Gantos	Hole in My Life
2015	John Green	The Fault in Our Stars
2015	Ellen Levine	Freedom's Children: Young Civil Rights Activists Tell Their Own Stories
2015	Barry Lyga	I Hunt Killers
2015	Walter Dean Myers	Lockdown
2015	Brandon Sanderson	The Rithmatist
2015	Art Spiegelman	Maus I: A Survivor's Tale
2015	Jonathan Stroud	Lockwood & Co: The Screaming Staircase
2016	Laurie Halse Anderson	Wintergirls
2016	Alexandra Bracken	The Darkest Minds
2016	Shannon Hale	Book of a Thousand Days
2016	Victoria Jamieson	Roller Girl
2016	Stephanie Kuehn	Charm & Strange
2016	John Lewis and Andrew Aydin	March
2016	Jonathan Maberry	Rot & Ruin
2016	Marissa Meyer	Cinder
2016	Mike Mullin	Ashfall
2016	Jane Yolen	Briar Rose
2017	Misty Copeland	Life in Motion: An Unlikely Ballerina
2017	Reyna Grande	The Distance Between Us: A Memoir
2017	Marjane Satrapi	Persepolis: The Story of a Childhood
2017	Libba Bray	The Diviners
2017	Rick Yancey	The Monstrumologist
2017	Terry Farish	The Good Braider
2017	Gayle Forman	Just One Day
2017	Jennifer Niven	All the Bright Places
2017	Lauren Oliver	Vanishing Girls
2017	Sonia Patel	Rani Patel in Full Effect
