= Dwarsligger =

Dwarsligger ("sleeper" or "crossbeam" in Dutch) is a book printed with text parallel to the spine of a conventional 12cm book. The dwarsligger is published by Uitgeverij Dwarsligger, part of Veen Bosch & Keuning Uitgeversgroep (VBK).

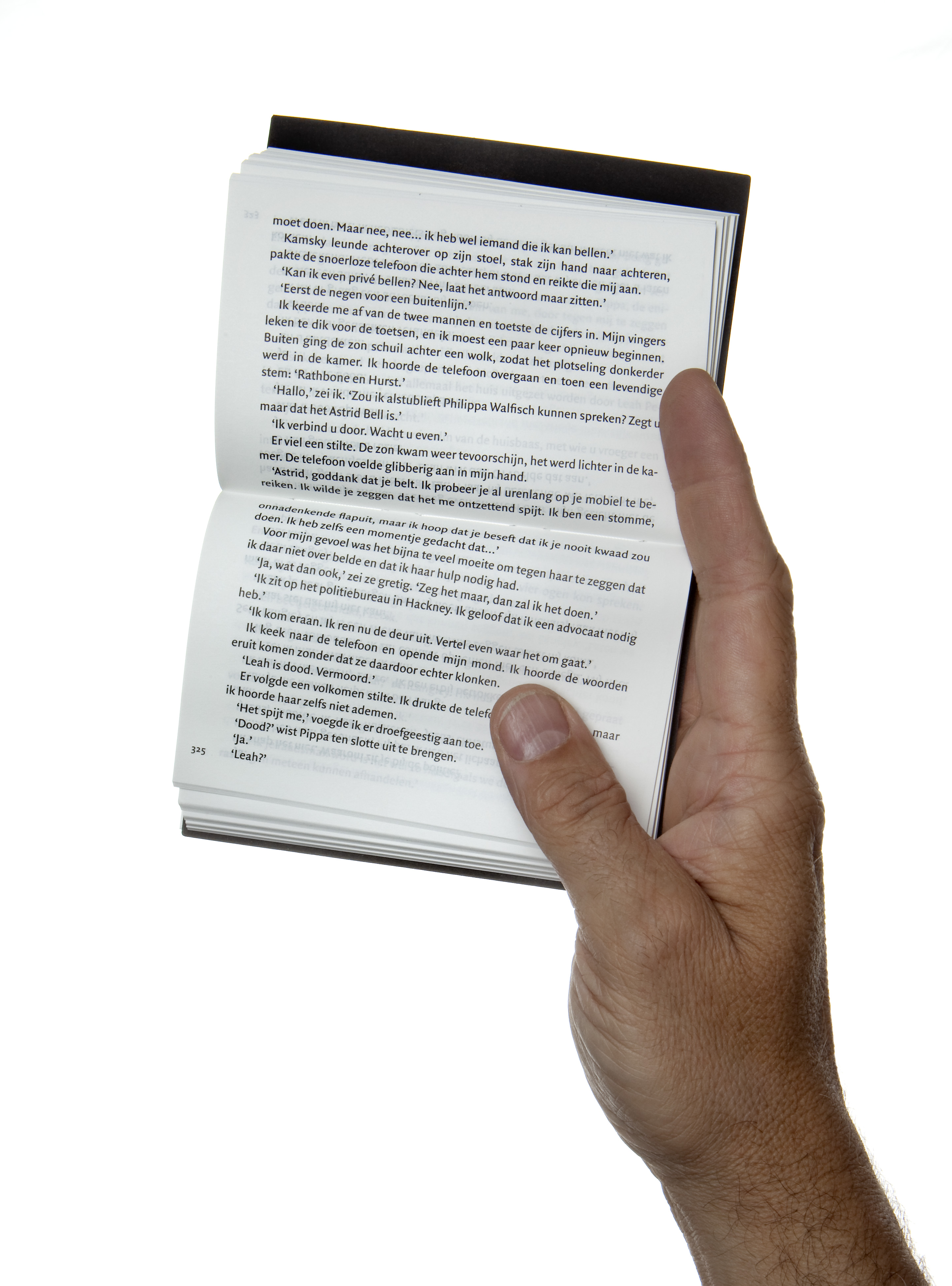
Publication in landscape format

== History ==
The dwarsligger was conceived by Hugo van Woerden, the director of the Dutch printer Jongbloed BV, a publishing house that specializes in printing on very thin paper that is commonly used for printing the Bible. The objective of this printing format was to deliver a new type of book that read pleasantly, was easy to carry, and did not collapse. Jongbloed BV only focused on printing Christian books, a niche market that proved too small. To expand interest in the book style, Jongbloed BV granted a license to Ambo / Anthos publishers.

The dwarsligger was registered as a trademark by Jongbloed BV in July 2006.

On September 6, 2009, the first Dutch copy of the dwarsligger entered circulation. The first copy, the Manuscripta by Herman Koch, was awarded to Ronald Plasterk, Minister of Education, Culture and Science.

== Features ==
The special binding method permits the dwarsligger to remain open without restraint, and can be browsed and read with one hand. The use of thin papers reduces the amount of raw materials used by conventional books. The format is amenable to various types of books such as novels, thrillers and non-fiction. Published by Uitgeverij dwarsligger, the format has been used in various titles by authors such as Herman Koch, Saskia Noort, Paulien Cornelisse and Dan Brown. In some cases the dwarsligger appears at the same time as the regular edition.

== International ==
In addition to the Dutch and Flemish market, they are also trying to launch the book format elsewhere. In 2010, the format entered the Spanish market and one year later the English publisher Hodder & Stoughton published a few dwarsliggers, under the name Flipback. In 2011, the Lutheran Bible was published in Germany in dwarsligger format.

In 2018, Penguin Random House launched the first titles in the format released in the United States under the Penguin Minis label. A year later they also released titles under the Random Minis label. Both imprints were short-lived with only 19 books being released in total over the course of a year, with dates on when they were released being uncertain as there was no formal announcement of their releases.

The titles produced under the Penguin Minis label go as follows: The Fault in Our Stars, Paper Towns, An Abundance of Katherines, and Looking for Alaska all by John Green, Between Shades of Gray by Ruta Sepetys, Legend by Marie Lu, Matched by Ally Condie, The Outsiders by S. E. Hinton, If I Stay by Gayle Forman, and Let it Snow by John Green, Maureen Johnson, and Lauren Myracle. As well as this, some Penguin in Bloom reprints of books were released in the format under the same label, those being A Little Princess by Frances Hodgson Burnett, Heidi by Johanna Spyri, and Anne of Green Gables by L. M. Montgomery. They were released in a box set together. As well as this, the four books solely by John Green were also released in a boxed set.

The titles produced under the Random Minis label were as follows: All the Bright Places by Jennifer Niven, Dear Martin by Nic Stone, Every Day by David Levithan, Everything, Everything by Nicola Yoon, I Am Not Your Perfect Mexican Daughter by Erika L. Sanchez, and We Were Liars by E. Lockhart.

== Variants ==
According to the trade journal Boekblad the publishers A.W. Bruna Uitgevers, Dutch Media and Nieuw Amsterdam launched the cross reader on September 15, 2010. In terms of size and appearance, the cross reader was very similar to the dwarsligger but with different paper: the dwarsligger is printed on thin paper, the cross reader is printed on pocket paper. The Belgian newspaper De Morgen reported on September 23, 2010 that the Dutch printing company Jongbloed, which holds the patent on the dwarsligger, considered legal action. The magazine Boekblad wrote on October 22, 2010 that lawyers were determining whether the Characters (an initiative of the publisher Karakter) and the cross reader violate the patent. On March 7, 2011 the publishers Dutch Media, A.W. Bruna and Nieuw Amsterdam announced that they had stopped selling cross readers because sales were below expectations. On March 11, 2011, the Karakter publishing house decided not to place their variant of the dwarsligger on the market.
