= Rani Patel in Full Effect =

2016 young adult novel by Sonia Patel

- Cover of Rani Patel in Full Effect
- Author: Sonia Patel
- Language: English
- Genre: Young adult literature, Historical fiction
- Publisher: Cinco Puntos Press
- Publication date: October 11, 2016
- Media type: Print (hardcover, paperback)
- ISBN: 978-1-94-102649-6

Rani Patel in Full Effect is a young adult, historical fiction novel by Sonia Patel, published October 11, 2016 by Cinco Puntos Press.

== Plot ==
Rani Patel in Full Effect takes place in 1991 on the Hawaiian island of Moloka’i. The novel follows Rani Patel, a Gujarati Indian teenager whose father has sexually abused her. Rani has kept the abuse a secret and at age 16, struggles with her identity and sexuality. After performing for an underground rap group, she begins to find herself as MC Sutra and becomes the island's first woman rapper. Meanwhile, Rani reveals her secret and begins to heal from her father's abuse.

== Reception ==
Rani Patel in Full Effect was generally well received by critics, including starred reviews from Booklist, Kirkus Reviews, Publishers Weekly, and School Library Journal.

Reviewers highlighted Rani's personality, saying it, too, was in “in full effect.” Booklist said, "Rani’s voice ... will resonate with many, even those with little to no familiarity with Rani’s background." Kirkus added, "A powerfully particular, 100 percent genuine character commands this gutsy debut."

Reviewers also noted that Rani's recovery is "unrealistically speedy and conclusive," which Patel, who is a psychiatrist, acknowledges in a concluding note. Despite this, Patel hopes the story "can stand as a model for victims." Given this, Publishers Weekly noted, "Patel compassionately portrays Rani’s entangled emotions, lack of self-confidence, and burgeoning sense of empowerment as she moves forward from trauma."

=== Awards and honors ===
Rani Patel in Full Effect was included in many "best of" and "must read" lists, including the following:

- BookExpo America Editor's Buzz Selection of 2016
- Kirkus Reviews Best Teen Books of 2016
- New York Public Library 50 Best Teen Books of 2016
- BookPage Top 10 Best Teen Book of 2016
- Multnomah County Library Best Books of 2016
- Volumes Bookcafe Staff's Best 20 of 2016
- Bustle's 15 Essential Novels Of The #MeToo Movement
- Texas Library Association Top 10 Teen Books of 2017

Awards for Rani Patel in Full Effect
Year	Award	Result	Ref.
2016	Booklist's Best First Novels for Youth: 2016	Top 10	
2017	American Library Association's Amelia Bloomer List (2017)	Selection	
2017	ALA Best Fiction for Young Adults	Selection	
2017	Booklist's Best Historical Fiction for Youth	Top 10	
2017	William C. Morris YA Debut Award	Finalist	
2017	YALSA's Popular Paperbacks for Young Adults	Top 10	
