= Again Again =

2020 novel by E. Lockhart

- Author: E. Lockhart
- Language: English
- Genre: Young adult fiction
- Published: 2020
- Publisher: Delacorte Press
- Publication date: June 2, 2020
- Publication place: United States
- Media type: Print (hardcover, paperback), audiobook
- Pages: 289
- ISBN: 9780385744799 Hardcover
- OCLC: 1119746192

Again Again is a young adult novel by E. Lockhart, published June 2, 2020 by Delacorte Press.

Again Again takes place in the same setting as Lockhart's The Disreputable History of Frankie Landau-Banks, Alabaster Preparatory Academy, though Again Again has a different protagonist, Adelaide Buchwald. The book follows Adelaide through a multiverse of opportunities over the summer between her junior and senior year of high school as she connects with a boy who once wrote a poem about her; the novel investigates the different ways their relationship might play out."

== Writing style ==
Again Again includes multiple possible storylines that provide "alternate details of the relationship" and "unfold ... much like a choose-your-own-ending story, except 'you' don't get to choose--Lockhart does." Throughout the novel, Lockhart uses different fonts to indicate when a new, parallel experience begins. One font follows the central story so readers "can follow one central narrative through the whole book." Another font exists for "every alternate universe," as well as a third font for another universe at the end of the story. Lockhart explained this choice saying, "I think if you were disoriented at the beginning, that's okay with me. Some people will be disoriented, but it was the best way."

Lockhart explained that she wanted to "tell a story that was really honest, but also not cynical about love." The solution for her was to write a story with "multiple universes."

== Reception ==
Again Again was generally well received by critics, including starred reviews from Booklist, The Bulletin of the Center for Children's Books, School Library Journal. School Library Journal said the book was "[a] lyrical read that's also fun as it addresses myriad truths."

Kirkus Reviews called the book "[a] thoughtfully subversive exploration of the diverging pathways of the human heart."

Publishers Weekly highlighted Lockhart's skill with plot twists, stating that Again Again takes the technique to a "new level, with a narrative that explores the idea of the multiverse, those infinite worlds loosed by paths taken and not taken."

Shelf Awareness commented on the book's "unusual" style, explaining how "alternate details of the relationship ... unfold along parallel routes, much like a choose-your-own-ending story, except 'you' don't get to choose--Lockhart does." They continued, stating, "In spite of the unusual timeline, Lockhart keeps the action moving. Scenes are short and just repetitive enough that readers know it's a re-do, but different enough that it's clear this is a synchronous event."

== TV adaptation ==
In July 2022, Lockhart announced that Again Again would be adapted for television after screen rights were acquired by Julie Plec's My So-Called Company and Universal Television. Lockhart and Carina Adly MacKenzie, wrote the script for Roswell, New Mexico, co-write the adaptation. MacKenzie will also serve as the show's showrunner and executive producer alongside Plec and Emily Cummins.

Lockhart called MacKenzie "a story queen and a brainiac who is very funny and mind-blowingly thoughtful," saying she "can't wait to go on this adventure with her."
