= Sonia Patel =

Indian-American psychiatrist and author

Sonia Patel is an American psychiatrist and author of young adult novels.

== Biography ==
Patel is a first-generation Indian immigrant.

She received a Bachelor of Arts degree in History from Stanford University and her medical degree from the John A. Burns School of Medicine at the University of Hawaiʻi at Mānoa.

Patel works in Hawai'i on the islands of Oahu and Molokai. She primarily works with young adults who exhibit "emotional issues with behavioral manifestations, gender and/or sexuality issues, abuse of all types, and/or family conflicts, to improve their self-worth, relationships, decision-making, and moods." She also works with families to "resolve complicated family systems issues."

She lives on the Hawaiian island of Oahu with her spouse, two children, and dog.

== Publications ==
- Rani Patel in Full Effect, published October 11, 2016 by Cinco Puntos Press
- Jaya and Rasa: A Love Story, published September 12, 2017 by Cinco Puntos Press
- Bloody Seoul, published July 2, 2019 by Cinco Puntos Press
- Gita Desai Is Not Here to Shut Up, expected to be published in 2023 by Penguin/Nancy Paulsen Books
- Ab(solutely) Normal, edited by Nora Shalaway Carpenter and Rocky Callen, expected to be published in 2023 by Candlewick Press

== Awards and honors ==
Year	Title	Award/Honor	Result	Cite
2017	Rani Patel in Full Effect	YALSA's Popular Paperbacks for Young Adults	Top 10	
2017	Rani Patel in Full Effect	William C. Morris YA Debut Award	Nominee	
2017	Rani Patel in Full Effect	American Library Association's Amelia Bloomer List	Selection	
2017	Rani Patel in Full Effect	Texas Library Association Top 10 Teen Books	Top 10	
2016	Rani Patel in Full Effect	BookExpo America Editor's Buzz	Selection	
2016	Rani Patel in Full Effect	Kirkus Reviews Best Teen Books	Selection	
2016	Rani Patel in Full Effect	New York Public Library 50 Best Teen Books	Selection	
2016	Rani Patel in Full Effect	BookPage Best Teen Book of 2016	Top 10	
2016	Rani Patel in Full Effect	Multnomah County Library Best Books of 2016	Selection	
2016	Rani Patel in Full Effect	Volumes Bookcafe Staff's Best 20 of 2016	Top 20	
