= Bloody Seoul =

2019 young adult novel by Sonia Patel

- Cover of Bloody Seoul
- Author: Sonia Patel
- Language: English
- Genre: Young adult literature
- Publisher: Cinco Puntos Press
- Media type: Print (hardcover, paperback)
- ISBN: 978-1-94-762720-8

Bloody Seoul is a young adult novel by Sonia Patel, published July 2, 2019 by Cinco Puntos Press.

== Reception ==
Bloody Seoul was generally well-received by critics.

Booklist called the novel a "powerful story about family, redemption, and finding out who you really are.”

Kirkus Reviews wrote, "Readers who are drawn to the darker side of Korean pop culture will enjoy this archetypal, yet solid, redemption story."

Publishers Weekly provided a mixed review, saying, "Patel ... resents the sights and sounds of Seoul accurately, though Rocky’s inner dialogue is indistinguishable from an American teenager’s, making the Korean setting feel superimposed." They further stated, "Secondary characters exist in broad caricature." However, "Patel’s choppy, terse sentences reflect Rocky’s precarious emotional state and compulsive behavior, which are explored alongside themes of redemption, self-discovery, and generational trauma."

Cleaver Magazine's Kristie Gadson also highlighted how Patel's writing reflects Rocky's experiences and said, "Patel’s writing shines. Her words flow across the page like a poem - descriptive yet succinct, observant of an entire world in so few phrases." Gadson continued, saying the novel "teaches us this lesson through colorful and subtly powerful storytelling, gripping readers from beginning to end."

In 2020, Bloody Seoul was in the top ten for the In the Margins Book Award.
