= Audrey, Wait! =

2008 young adult romance novel by Robin Benway

- Cover of Audrey, Wait!
- Author: Robin Benway
- Language: English
- Genre: Young adult literature, Romance
- Publisher: Razorbill
- Publication date: April 10th 2008
- Publication place: United States
- Media type: Print (hardcover, paperback)
- ISBN: 978-1-59-514191-0

Audrey, Wait! is a young adult romance novel by Robin Benway, published April 10, 2008 by Razorbill.

== Reception ==
Audrey, Wait! was generally well-received, including a starred review from Publishers Weekly, who said, "Audrey's phenomenal celebrity seems unlikely but she herself feels completely believable, and readers will find her both sympathetic and funny." They further noted, "Benway displays a keen ear for dialogue; this first novelist has a knack for showcasing her characters' wit as well as their sincere concern for one another."

Kirkus Reviews called the book a "pleasant little romp," noting that "[i]ndividual characterizations slop together a bit," but the "profusion of teen wit ... both quells the mayhem of Audrey’s life and holds the story together." They concluded, "Readers won’t find much substance here but they will find entertainment, well pitched to the target audience of mid-teen girls."

The book also received a positive review from Booklist.

However, Common Sense Media gave the book three out of five stars, saying it provided a "[g]ood lesson on fame's price" but content "iffy content," including concerns regarding language; sex, romance, and nudity; products and purchases; and drinking, drugs, and smoking. They further expanded on this critique, saying, "Parents need to know that the main character has sex with her boyfriend, who also smokes pot. She drinks alcohol and makes out with a rock star after a concert. She lies to her parents but has a mostly affectionate relationship with them. The family spends time together and she respects their opinion of her."

Awards and honors for Audrey, Wait!
Year	Award/Honor	Result	Ref.
2009	YALSA's Best Books for Young Adults	Selection	
2010	Rhode Island Teen Book Award	Nominee	
2014	YALSA's Popular Paperbacks for Young Adults	Top 10	
