= All the Bright Places (film) =

2020 teen romantic drama movie directed by Brett Haley

- Official poster
- Directed by: Brett Haley
- Screenplay by: Jennifer Niven; Liz Hannah
- Based on: All the Bright Places by Jennifer Niven
- Produced by: Paula Mazur; Mitchell Kaplan; Elle Fanning; Brittany Kahan-Ward; Doug Mankoff; Andrew Spaulding
- Starring: Elle Fanning; Justice Smith; Alexandra Shipp; Kelli O'Hara; Lamar Johnson; Virginia Gardner; Felix Mallard; Sofia Hasmik; Keegan-Michael Key; Luke Wilson
- Cinematography: Rob C. Givens
- Edited by: Suzy Elmiger
- Music by: Keegan DeWitt
- Production companies: Echo Lake Entertainment; Mazur/Kaplan Company; Demarest Media
- Distributed by: Netflix
- Release date: February 28, 2020
- Running time: 108 minutes
- Country: United States
- Language: English

All the Bright Places is a 2020 American teen romantic drama film, directed by Brett Haley, from a screenplay by Jennifer Niven and Liz Hannah, adapted from the novel of the same name by Niven. It stars Elle Fanning, Justice Smith, Alexandra Shipp, Kelli O'Hara, Lamar Johnson, Virginia Gardner, Felix Mallard, Sofia Hasmik, Keegan-Michael Key, and Luke Wilson.

It was released on February 28, 2020, by Netflix, to positive reviews from critics.

== Plot ==
Theodore Finch and Violet Markey are two teenagers who live unhappily in a small Indiana town. She is quietly dealing with survivor's guilt after the death of her sister Eleanor and he is a depressed loner, called a freak by other students.

Finch and Violet meet on the bridge where Eleanor died in a car crash nine months earlier. Violet survived the crash, and has not been in a car since. She finds herself standing on the edge of the bridge on what would have been Eleanor's nineteenth birthday. Finch, out for a run, sees Violet perched on the edge looking in and climbs up next to her, talking her down from a possible suicide.

Finch begins a partnership with an initially reluctant Violet for a school project that requires the students to explore Indiana together. He looks her up on Facebook, researches her sister's car accident, reads through Violet's old writing, and chats with her online. Finch and Violet travel around Indiana to see sites chosen by him for the project.

Violet refuses to travel by car, so they bike to the highest point in Indiana. However, to visit a miniature roller coaster too far away to bike to, she agrees to get in Finch's car. Violet returns to writing, for the first time since Eleanor's death. He helps her talk about her sister, which no one else had managed to do. Violet slowly begins to heal and they fall in love.

Violet notices Finch's occasionally strange behavior. He sometimes disappears for days. One day, while they are swimming at the Blue Hole, Finch disappears under the water. By the time he resurfaces, Violet is distraught and forces him to tell her more about himself, threatening to leave if he doesn't. Finch reveals that he had been physically abused by his father, who sometimes got into "dark moods", and periodically comes close to drowning himself as a means of feeling in control.

On one occasion, Finch and Violet stay out all night by accident, upsetting Violet's parents. At school that day, he loses his temper on Violet's ex-boyfriend after being called a "freak." The two boys fight, and Finch leaves in his car. Violet, who broke up the fight, ends up in the principal's office with Finch's closest friend, Charlie, who talks to her about him.

Finch attends a support group session, earlier recommended by the school guidance counselor, but nothing fruitful comes of it, partly because he cannot describe his problems. He visits the bar where his sister Kate works and prompts her to speculate on why their father was abusive, and whether he could have been helped. Upset, Kate dismisses the topic, saying she doesn't care, and that their father is someone else's problem now. Disappointed, Finch leaves for their house, where Violet is waiting. As she questions him about the post-it notes put up everywhere, he alludes to his episodes of "dark moods" when he fails to "stay awake." Finally, convinced he is beyond help, he shouts at her to leave.

Finch disappears again. As suggested by her father, Violet checks places they had visited together and drives to the Blue Hole. There, she finds Finch's clothes and phone, and correctly infers that he has drowned himself. Some time later, she attends his funeral.

While healing from Finch's suicide, Violet finds the map they used to travel around Indiana and notices the last location they were supposed to visit together marked in red. It's the Travelers' Prayers Chapel, a resting place for travelers and a place of healing for mourners. She finds his signature in the guest book.

== Cast ==
- Elle Fanning as Violet Markey
- Justice Smith as Theodore "Theo" Finch
- Alexandra Shipp as Kate Finch
- Luke Wilson as James Markey
- Kelli O'Hara as Sheryl Markey
- Lamar Johnson as Charlie
- Virginia Gardner as Amanda
- Felix Mallard as Roamer
- Sofia Hasmik as Brenda
- Keegan-Michael Key as Richard Embry
- Chris Grace as Hudson

== Production ==
In July 2015, it was announced that Elle Fanning would star in All the Bright Places, with author Jennifer Niven writing the adapted screenplay. In July 2015, it was announced that Miguel Arteta would be directing the film. In July 2018, Justice Smith joined the cast of the film, with Brett Haley replacing Arteta as director, and Liz Hannah co-writing the script with Niven. Echo Lake Entertainment and FilmNation Entertainment produced the film, with Fanning, Paula Mazur, Mitchell Kaplan, Doug Mankoff, Andrew Spaulding, and Brittany Kahn serving as producers, while Hannah served as an executive producer.

In October 2018, Alexandra Shipp, Keegan-Michael Key, Luke Wilson, Kelli O'Hara, Virginia Gardner, Felix Mallard, Lamar Johnson, and Sofia Hasmik joined the cast of the film, with Netflix distributing. Principal photography began on October 4, 2018, in Elyria, Ohio.

== Release ==
The film was released on February 28, 2020 through Netflix.

== Critical reception ==
As of October 2021, All The Bright Places holds a 64% approval rating on review aggregator website Rotten Tomatoes, based on 39 reviews, with an average of 6.2/10. The website's critics consensus reads: "Though it at times buckles under the emotional weight of its source material, All The Bright Places [sic] succeeds on the strength of Elle Fanning and Justice Smith's charming and tender performances." On Metacritic, the film holds a rating of 61 out of 100, based on 9 critics, indicating "generally favorable" reviews.

Kimber Myers of the Los Angeles Times gave the film a positive review writing: "Though it's not without humor, "All the Bright Places" takes teens' emotions seriously and will move romantics of any age - in possibly unexpected ways". Courtney Howard of Variety gave the film a positive review writing: "Its pure beating heart and humanistic undertones make it somewhat of a standout". Candice Frederick of The New York Times also gave the film a positive review writing: "Smith and Fanning bring thoughtful performances to this delicate tale." Benjamin Lee of The Guardian gave the film 2 out of 5 stars writing: "There's messaging inserted near the start of the end credits for those who might be affected by the themes raised. But it doesn't negate what comes before it: a film that lingers briefly in the deep end but remains disappointingly shallow."
