= We Were Liars (TV series) =

American psychological thriller series

- Amazon Prime Video poster
- Genre: Psychological thriller; Family drama
- Based on: We Were Liars by E. Lockhart
- Developed by: Julie Plec & Carina Adly Mackenzie
- Showrunners: Julie Plec; Carina Adly Mackenzie
- Starring: Emily Alyn Lind; Caitlin FitzGerald; Mamie Gummer; Candice King; Rahul Kohli; Shubham Maheshwari; Esther McGregor; Joseph Zada; David Morse; Dempsey Bryk; Elysia Roorbach; Parker Lapaine; Madison Wolfe; Josh Dallas; Peyton List; Costa D'Angelo
- Music by: Michael Suby
- Country of origin: United States
- Original language: English
- No. of seasons: 1
- No. of episodes: 8

Production
- Executive producers: Julie Plec; Carina Adly MacKenzie; Emily Cummins; Brett Matthews; Pascal Verschooris; E. Lockhart; Nzingha Stewart
- Producers: Kimberly Ndombe; Holly Redford
- Cinematography: Simon Duggan; Cary Lalonde; Sylvaine Dufaux
- Editors: Benjamin Callahan; Nathan Easterling; Rachel Katz-Overstreet; Orlee Buium; Evan J. Warner
- Running time: 51–61 minutes
- Production companies: Because Magic Whatever; My So-Called Company; Universal Television; Amazon MGM Studios

Original release
- Network: Amazon Prime Video
- Release: June 18, 2025 – present

We Were Liars is an American psychological thriller television series based on the 2014 novel of the same name by E. Lockhart. It premiered on Amazon Prime Video on June 18, 2025. It was renewed for a second season in September 2025.

== Cast ==
=== Main ===
- Emily Alyn Lind as Cadence "Cady" Sinclair Eastman, the eldest grandchild of Harris and Tipper who suffers from memory loss after an accident and one of the Liars.
  - Raewynn Martel as young Cadence.
- Caitlin FitzGerald as Penny Sinclair, the middle Sinclair sister and Cadence's mother.
  - Elysia Roorbach (season 2) as teen Penny Sinclair.
- Mamie Gummer as Carrie Sinclair, the eldest Sinclair sister and Johnny's mother who is a recovering drug addict. She is in a long-term relationship with Ed.
  - Parker Lapaine (season 2) as teen Carrie Sinclair.
- Candice King as Bess Sinclair, the youngest Sinclair sister and Mirren's mother.
  - Madison Wolfe (season 2) as teen Bess Sinclair.
- Rahul Kohli as Ed Patil, Carrie's long-term significant other and Gat's uncle.
- Shubham Maheshwari as Gat Patil, Ed's nephew and one of the Liars as well as Cadence's love interest.
  - Leandro Vigueras as young Gat.
- Esther McGregor as Mirren Sinclair Sheffield, Bess' eldest daughter and one of the Liars.
  - Nikita Gold as young Mirren.
- Joseph Zada as Johnny Sinclair Dennis, Carrie's eldest son and one of the Liars. He has a problematic temper that causes tension between his mother and grandfather.
  - Quinn LeBlanc as young Johnny
- David Morse as Harris Sinclair, the patriarch of the Sinclairs who owns the Clairmont House on his private island known as Beechwood Island. He holds his vast fortune over his daughters' heads to keep them in line and shape them into being his ideal heirs.
  - Josh Dallas (season 2) as middle aged Harris Sinclair.
- Peyton List as middle aged Tipper Taft Sinclair (season 2), Harris's wife and the matriarch of the Sinclairs.
- Dempsey Bryk as Ebon (season 2; recurring season 1), a teenage water taxi driver and Mirren's love interest.
- Costa D'Angelo as Pfeff (season 2)

=== Recurring ===
- Wendy Crewson (season 1) as old Tipper Taft Sinclair, Harris's wife and the matriarch of the Sinclairs
- Tim Rozon as Daniel "Salty Dan", Beechwood's harbor service guy and Bess's lover
- Dylan Bruce as Brody Sheffield, Bess's husband and Mirren's father

== Episodes ==
No.	Title	Directed by	Teleplay by	Original release date
1	"Tell Me Sweet Little Lies"	Nzingha Stewart	Julie Plec	June 18, 2025 (Note: This episode was first shown at the 2025 Tribeca Festival on June 10, 2025.)
The wealthy Sinclair family arrives on Beechwood Island for "Summer 16" (when the oldest grandchildren were 16). Cadence spends her time on the island with her cousins Mirren and Johnny, as well as Gat, her aunt's partner's nephew whom she has developed feelings for; the four teenagers dub themselves "the Liars". Cadence invites Gat to watch a meteor shower together, but Johnny convinces them to attend a boat party instead. Cadence leaves the party, upset, but Gat follows after her and they kiss. Two months later, Cadence washes up on the beach alone and with no memory of what happened.
2	"Wrap Her Up in a Package of Lies"	Julie Plec	Carina Adly Mackenzie	June 18, 2025
Cadence has amnesia and severe migraines after the accident. With no contact from the remaining Liars, she spends the year withdrawn from life, self-medicating with painkillers and alcohol. She arrives on Beechwood Island the following summer, determined to find out the truth about the accident, which her family has been keeping from her. In flashbacks, Gat clashes with the Liars over their privilege. He also acts strangely toward Cadence after the kiss, and she finds out that he has a girlfriend back home. After the family spends Father's Day together, Tipper dies in her sleep.
3	"The Ties Were Black, the Lies Were White"	Tara Miele	Brett Matthews; Story by : Brett Matthews & Rohit Kumar	June 18, 2025
Cadence confronts Harris about his decision to rebuild and modernize Tipper's beloved Clairmont house. In flashbacks, the Sinclairs attend Tipper's funeral. Blake Beaumont, Johnny's rival, is also at the funeral, and Johnny is surprised to find out that he has been sexting Mirren. Johnny angrily accuses Blake of using Mirren to provoke him, and the two get into a physical altercation that escalates into a heated exchange before they are interrupted by Cadence. Meanwhile, Penny, Carrie, and Bess fight over Tipper's black pearl necklace, leading Harris to harshly reprimand them and cut them off.
4	"The Fourth of You Lie"	Tara Miele	Fola Goke-Pariola & Scarlett Curtis	June 18, 2025
In flashbacks, the Sinclairs celebrate the Fourth of July, despite the loss of Tipper. Each facing their own financial difficulties, Penny, Carrie, and Bess plan to win back Harris's favor. Carrie admits to Harris that she drained her savings to solve a problem Johnny got into. She later rejects Ed's marriage proposal to appease Harris, who does not approve of the relationship. Meanwhile, the Liars throw their own party, and Cadence gets drunk and flirts with several boys in an attempt to get over Gat. Gat later tells her that he broke up with his girlfriend, and the two share a romantic moment. Mirren sleeps with a water taxi driver, Ebon. In the present, Cadence unlocks Johnny's phone and watches a blackmail video from Blake, showing Johnny violently assaulting another boy.
5	"Lying Together in a Silver Lining"	So Yong Kim	Sid Gopinath & Aditya Joshi & Carina Adly MacKenzie	June 18, 2025
In flashbacks, Penny, Carrie, and Bess each instruct their children to stay in Harris's good graces to ensure their financial security. As tensions rise between the sisters, a storm rolls in. The family panics when they realize that Johnny's brother, Will, is missing. Gat and Johnny take a boat out to sea to save him, but nearly drown before being saved by Ed. Johnny later confesses to Gat that he assaulted a member of a rival tennis team in a prank gone wrong, and that his mother had to pay everyone off to preserve the family name. In both the present and in a flashback, Cadence and Gat have sex.
6	"When Lies Gives You Lemons"	So Yong Kim	Gursimran Sandhu & Allison Sanchez	June 18, 2025
In flashbacks, Gat's mother, Maya, visits Beechwood Island during the Sinclairs' annual lemon hunt. Harris states that whoever collects the most lemons will receive the family's Boston home, and whoever finds the lime will be the sole inheritor of Beechwood Island. While the Sinclairs frantically scour the island, Maya expresses concern over Gat suppressing his true self to fit in with the family. The hunt culminates in an argument between Cadence, Mirren, and Johnny, before Gat reveals that he found the lime, locked away by Harris. The cousins, realizing they were manipulated, give all of their lemons to Gat. Rather than awarding Gat the Boston house, Harris instead recommends him for an internship that will keep him away from Beechwood Island the following summer.
7	"Everybody Knows That the Captain Lied"	Erica Dunton	Carina Adly MacKenzie & Julie Plec & Maya Vyas	June 18, 2025
In flashbacks, tensions come to a head at a family dinner where Penny, Carrie, and Bess air out each others' secrets and Cadence, Mirren, and Johnny sabotage any chances of inheriting Harris's estate. After Cadence accuses Harris of being bigoted toward Ed and Gat, Harris slips and hits his head. While the sisters rush him to the hospital, Penny instructs Cadence to find the last draft of his will and to burn it if it does not favor them. Left alone on the island, Cadence rallies the Liars to burn Clairmont to the ground in an act of rebellion and purification, not revealing that Harris bequeathed Beechwood Island to her.
8	"My Friends Are Lying in the Sun"	Erica Dunton	E. Lockhart	June 18, 2025
Though Cadence remembers the fire, she still does not know how Summer 16 ended. For her 18th birthday, Harris gifts her the black pearl necklace, which triggers an episode of flashbacks. The Liars arrive to comfort her, but Cadence confronts them about abandoning her after the accident. The Liars tell her the truth; the three of them were actually killed in the fire and Cadence has been speaking to their ghosts. The fire made the Sinclair sisters bond with each other, finally leaving their grievances behind with each of them trying to change; Penny gives her daughter the chance to choose who she wants to become in her life, Carrie gets back with Ed and Bess arranges Mirren's paintings to be exhibit while also giving herself a second chance in her marriage with Brody. Cadence tries to return the necklace to Harris, but he calls her entitled and tells her that he lied about the cause of the fire to protect the family. Instead of indulging his wishes and speaking to a reporter for a puff piece about their family, Cadence leaves the island, stating that she was once a Sinclair, but will always be a Liar.

== Production ==
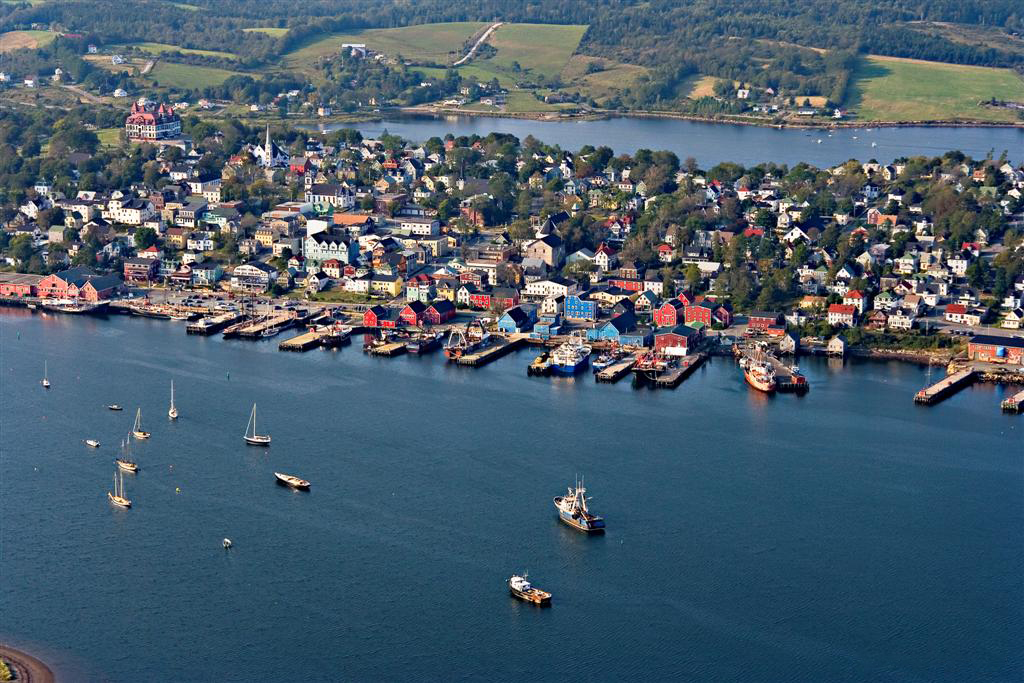
The series was shot in Lunenburg, Nova Scotia.

=== Development ===
E. Lockhart's bestselling young adult novel, We Were Liars, and its prequel, Family of Liars, were optioned by My So-Called Company and Universal Television in July 2022. That December, it was announced that Amazon MGM Studios was developing a television series based on the novel, and the project received a series order in March 2023.

In March 2024, it was announced that Nzingha Stewart would direct the first episode of the series. On September 17, 2025, Amazon Prime Video renewed the series for a second season.

=== Casting ===
An open casting call for the series' four lead roles was posted on Lockhart's Instagram page on April 1, 2023. On May 30, 2024, it was announced that Emily Alyn Lind, Shubham Maheshwari, Esther McGregor, and Joseph Zada were cast as Cadence, Gat, Mirren, and Johnny, respectively.

Mamie Gummer, Caitlin FitzGerald, and Candice King were announced as cast members on March 5, 2024. David Morse, Arsher Ali, and Wendy Crewson were announced as cast members in late May 2024, but Ali was replaced by Rahul Kohli the following month.

On March 9, 2026, Dempsey Bryk was promoted to series regular for the second season. On May 7, 2026, Josh Dallas, Costa D'Angelo, Peyton List, Madison Wolfe, Parker Lepaine, and Elyssia Roorbach joined the main cast for the second season. On June 25, 2026, Riley Voelkel, Madeleine Arthur, Jaelynn Thora Brooks, Layla Douglas, Callan Potter, Aidan Shaw, Shaun Sipos and Brendon Tremblay joined the cast in recurring roles for the second season.

=== Filming ===
Principal photography began in June 2024. Filming took place in Halifax and Lunenburg, Nova Scotia, and was completed by late September 2024.

== Release ==
The series was released on Amazon Prime Video on June 18, 2025.

== Reception ==
The review aggregator website Rotten Tomatoes reported a 62% approval rating based on 26 critic reviews. The website's critics consensus reads, "We Were Liars might be Succession-lite, but its juicy family dynamics mixed with psychological intrigue will leave viewers amply satisfied and quietly shattered." Metacritic, which uses a weighted average, assigned a score of 57 out of 100 based on 11 critics, indicating "mixed or average".

Reviewing the series for The Age, Kylie Northover gave a rating of 4/5 and described it "essentially a junior Succession, but there's enough adult soapiness for We Were Liars to appeal to a broad audience. Lauren Thoman of TheWrap said, "Overall, We Were Liars is a solid entry into the hazy summer melodrama canon, sitting comfortably beside other twisty, sun-soaked series like Big Little Lies and Cruel Summer."

It reached #1 on the Top 10 TV Shows on Prime Video during its month of release.
