= Liz Hannah =

American screenwriter and producer (born 1985)

- Born: Elizabeth Hannah; December 14, 1985 (age 40); New York City, U.S.
- Education: Pratt Institute; AFI Conservatory
- Occupations: Screenwriter; producer
- Spouse: Brian Millikin

Elizabeth Hannah (born December 14, 1985) is an American screenwriter and film producer. She is best known for her work on Steven Spielberg's 2017 journalism drama The Post for which she was nominated for a Golden Globe for Best Screenplay.

== Early life and education ==
Hannah did her undergraduate studies at the Pratt Institute in New York. Following an internship on 2007's Reign Over Me, she was admitted to the AFI Conservatory, in the producing discipline.

== Career ==
After graduating from AFI, Hannah moved to Los Angeles. She got a job in development at Denver & Delilah, Charlize Theron’s production company. Several years into her role, Hannah realized she didn't want to be a producer and decided to write a film of her own about "a 70th-birthday party gone awry." She sent the script to her boss and in 2012, based on the encouraging feedback, quit her job to pursue writing full-time.

Over the next couple of years, she wrote a spec pilot that was sold but not made, and wrote for a web series called Guidance.

During this period, Hannah read Personal History, the 1997 autobiography of The Washington Post publisher Katharine Graham. Her then-boyfriend (now husband) challenged her to write Graham's story as a film.

In October 2016, Hannah sent the finished script, titled The Post, out to agents, with the hope of finding representation. On October 28, she received a call from producer Amy Pascal, the former chair of Sony Pictures. The script appeared at number two on the 2016 Black List, an annual Hollywood survey of the "most liked" film screenplays not yet produced. Pascal won an auction for the script soon after, and quickly enlisted Steven Spielberg, Meryl Streep and Tom Hanks as director and stars, respectively.

Spielberg, who was in post-production on Ready Player One, decided to make the film immediately. Hannah was partnered with screenwriter Josh Singer, an Oscar winner for 2015 journalism drama Spotlight, and with the on-set writing experience Hannah lacked. Principal photography began on May 30, 2017.

The Post, Hannah's first feature film, was released on December 22, 2017. She was nominated for a Golden Globe for Best Screenplay for her work.

Hannah's next film, the political comedy Long Shot, starring Seth Rogen and Charlize Theron, premiered at South by Southwest on March 9, 2019, and was theatrically released in the United States on May 3, 2019 by Lionsgate.

In July 2018, it was announced Hannah would co-write All the Bright Places alongside author Jennifer Niven. Principal photography on the film started in October 2018 and it is scheduled to be released on February 28, 2020. The film will be distributed by Netflix.

It was announced on October 27, 2017 that Hannah would write the script for Only Plane in the Sky for MGM, based on a Politico article by Garrett Graff about the immediate aftermath of the September 11 attacks. She is also working on a miniseries titled Mercury 13 for Amazon Video, based on Martha Ackmann’s book The Mercury 13: The Untold Story of Thirteen American Women and the Dream of Space Flight. The project reunites Hannah with The Post producer Pascal and actor Bradley Whitford. Hannah would serve as showrunner and executive producer should the show be ordered to series. More recently she started Happy Friday Productions with an overall deal at Civic Center/MRC Television.

== Filmography ==
Film

Year	Title	Credit	Notes
2017	The Post	Written by, Co-producer	With Josh Singer; Nominated for Golden Globe for Best Screenplay
2019	Long Shot	Written by	With Dan Sterling
2020	All the Bright Places	Written by, executive producer	With Jennifer Niven
2023	Lee	Written by, executive producer	With John Collee

Television

Year(s)	Title	Credit	Note(s)
2019	Mindhunter	Writer; Producer Season 2	2 episodes
2022	The Dropout	Writer; executive producer	Episode: "Flower of Life"
2022	The Girl from Plainville	Co-creator; writer; executive producer	3 episodes
