= Nana in the City =

2014 children's picture book by Lauren Castillo

- Author: Lauren Castillo
- Illustrator: Lauren Castillo
- Language: English
- Genre: Children's picture book
- Publisher: Clarion Books
- Publication date: 2014
- Publication place: United States
- Pages: 40
- ISBN: 978-0544104433

Nana in the City is a children's picture book written and illustrated by Lauren Castillo. It was published by Houghton Mifflin Harcourt in 2014. Nana in the City was awarded a Caldecott Honor in 2015.

Lauren Castillo's other books include The Troublemaker and Melvin and the Boy. She has also illustrated books by other authors, including The Reader by Amy Hest and What Happens on Wednesdays by E. Lockhart.

== Plot ==
Nana in the City starts off with a young boy who visits his Nana (grandmother) and her new apartment in New York City. He shows how much he loves and appreciates his Nana but he does not feel the same way about the city. The boy does not think that his Nana should be living in the city as he tells her, but Nana feels the opposite.

Nana shows the boy how wonderful the city is. She knits him a fancy red cape and makes him wear it, making him feel fearless and courageous. He still notices the things that he saw from the other day, but it is not as bad as he thought it was. He starts to appreciate the city. Later that next day, he agrees with his Nana that the city is filled with amazing things. He then confirms that there are many fun things that his Nana can do in the city even though it can get loud and busy. When it is time for the young boy to leave, he offers his cape to his Nana to keep her bold being in the city. After exploring the city a little bit more, he then realizes that it is a great place for his Nana to live and for him to visit.

== Critical reception ==
"A sweet story for country-mouse readers." – Kirkus

"It deserves a place on the shelf of classic New York City picture books." – Publishers Weekly

"This is a JUST RIGHT kind of book. Just the right size; just the right tone; just the right scope of experience/adventure for the audience." – The Horn Book

== Awards ==
- 2015 Caldecott Honor Book

== See also ==
- Caldecott Medal
