= Octavia Fry Rogan =

American librarian

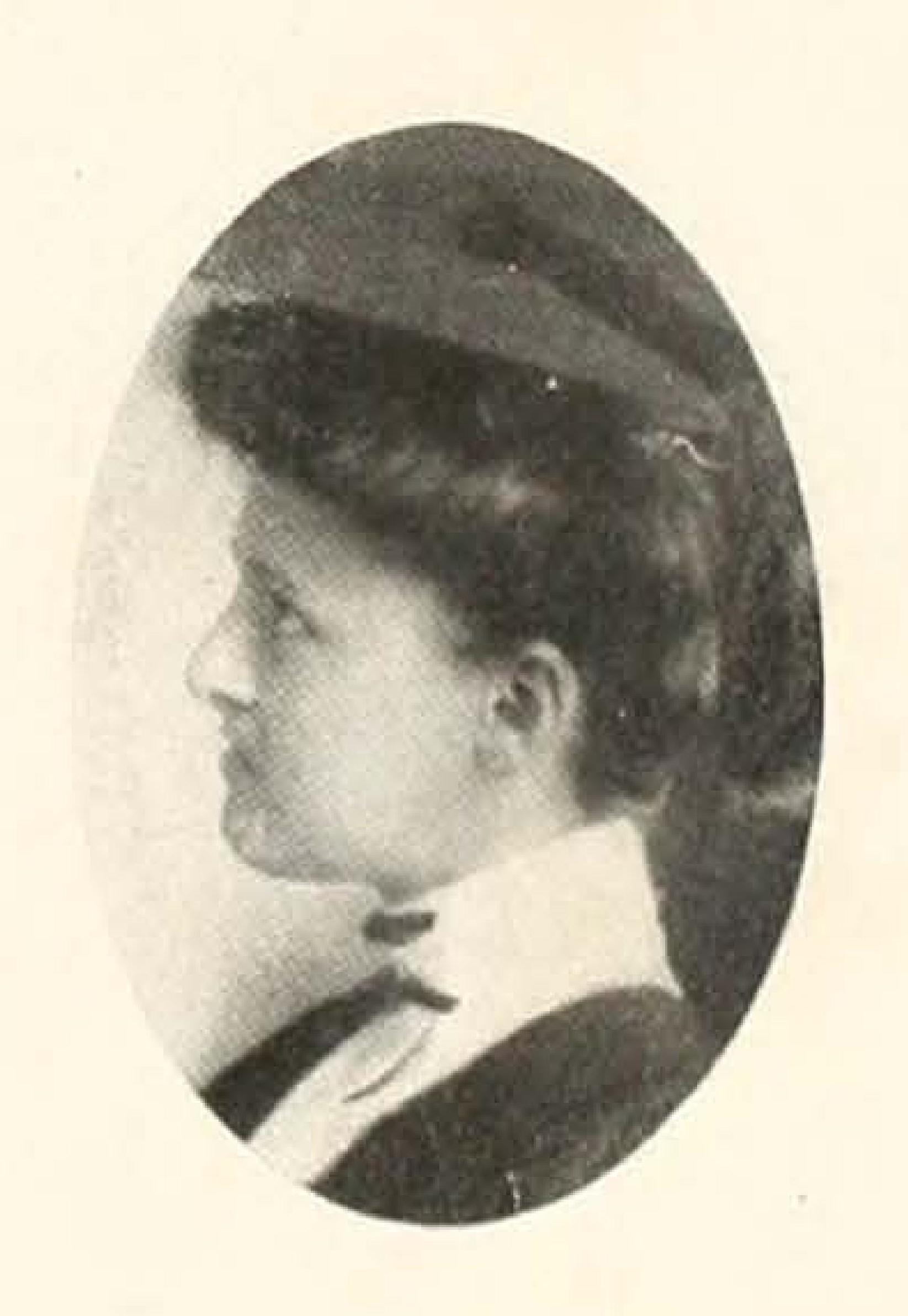
Octavia Fry Rogan (1908).

Octavia Fry Rogan (October 18, 1886 – March 1973) was an American librarian. She served as state librarian and president of the Texas Library Association.
