= Carina Adly Mackenzie =

American producer, author and screenwriter

Carina Adly Mackenzie is an American producer, young adult novelist, and screenwriter best known for creating the CW TV series Roswell, New Mexico. and Prime Video's adaptation We Were Liars.

== Early life ==
Mackenzie grew up in Greenwich, Connecticut, and studied English at the University of Colorado at Boulder before moving to Los Angeles to become a writer.

== Career ==
Before becoming a screenwriter, she was a television critic at Zap2it.com, the Los Angeles Times, and Teen Vogue, writing among other things about the American teen drama TV show Gossip Girl.

Mackenzie spent five years as staff writer on The Originals and also wrote for The Flash.

=== Eternal Night ===
She wrote a young adult novel for Paper Lantern Lit, a literary development company, called Eternal Night, about gods living in plain sight of humans and then disappearing, bringing chaos onto the world. It was published in August 2014. Mackenzie notes being frustrated in 2012, wanting to write a novel but feeling that every publishing house, literary agent, and packaging company she spoke to about that topic was only interested in something like the Fifty Shades series, which she personally was not interested in writing. An author friend, Rebecca Serle, whom she knew through her work as a television critic, recommended she approach PaperLantern Lit. She submitted a sample of her current work in progress, which led to the eventual creation of Eternal Night.

=== Roswell, New Mexico ===
Mackenzie created the Roswell, New Mexico television series, a reboot of the original Roswell series that launched in 1999 and also included novels.

In July 2020, it was announced she would no longer be serving as executive producer and co-showrunner starting with the third season of the series.

=== We Were Liars ===
In January 2023, it was announced that Mackenzie would write the second episode of the new We Were Liars TV series ordered by Amazon, which is based on the young adult contemporary novel We Were Liars, an amnesia thriller set on a private island close to Massachusetts, written by E. Lockhart. Mackenzie also serves as an executive producer along with Julie Plec, Emily Cummins, and Lockhart.

== Filmography ==
Year	Project	Platform	Episodes	Screenwriter	Producer	Showrunner	Creator	Ref.
2017	The Flash	The CW	1 episode	Yes	No	No	No	
2014–2018	The Originals	The CW	36 episodes	Yes	No	No	No	
2019–2022	Roswell, New Mexico	The CW	52 episodes	Yes	Yes	Yes	Yes	
2025	We Were Liars	Prime Video		Yes	Yes	No	No	

== Personal life ==
Mackenzie had wanted to become a writer since she was six. She has been interested in politics since she was thirteen years old. She likes cowboys and classic sci-fi.
