= The Good Braider =

2012 novel by Terry Farish

- Cover of The Good Braider
- Author: Terry Farish
- Language: English
- Genre: Young adult, Historical fiction, Poetry
- Publisher: Marshall Cavendish
- Publication date: May 1st 2012
- Media type: Print (hardcover, paperback)
- ISBN: 978-0-76-146267-5

The Good Braider is a young adult novel in verse by Terry Farish, published May 1, 2012 by Marshall Cavendish.

== Reception ==
The Good Braider received starred reviews from School Library Journal and Booklist, as well as positive reviews from Bulletin of the Center for Children's Books and Kirkus. The American Immigration Council called the book "bold and brave."

The book has been discussed in academic journals, including Journal of Children's Literature, NCTE's Talking Points, Journal of Adolescent & Adult Literacy, The ESSE Messenger, and English Journal.

Bank Street College of Education named The Good Braider one of the best children's books of 2013.

Awards for The Good Braider
Year	Award	Result	Ref.
2012	Lupine Award Juvenile/Young Adult	Winner	
2013	ALA Best Fiction for Young Adults	Selection	
2013	Boston Authors Club Young Reader Award	Winner	
2013–2014	Georgia Peach Book Award	Finalist	
2014	ALA Outstanding Books for the College Bound and Lifelong Learner	Selection	
2014	Texas Library Association TAYSHAS Reading List	Selection	
2017	YALSA's Popular Paperbacks for Young Adults	Top 10	
	Indiana Eliot Rosewater High School Book Award	Winner	
	Goodreads Best Multicultural Young Adult Book		
