= Jaya and Rasa: A Love Story =

2017 young adult novel by Sonia Patel

- Cover of Jaya and Rasa: A Love Story
- Author: Sonia Patel
- Language: English
- Genre: Children's literature
- Publisher: Cinco Puntos Press
- Publication date: September 12, 2017
- Publication place: United States
- Media type: Print
- ISBN: 978-1-94-102687-8

Jaya and Rasa: A Love Story is a young adult novel by Sonia Patel, published September 12, 2017 by Cinco Puntos Press.

== Plot ==
Jaya and Rasa takes place in Hawaii and follows Jaya Mehta and Rasa Santos, two teenagers who fall in love. Jaya is transgender and comes from a wealthy Gujarati Indian family. To escape the loneliness that comes from bullying and his parents' dysfunctional marriage, he listens to Nirvana. Raya, on the other hand, grew up living in a shack and caring for her younger siblings. Her mother is a prostitute, and Raya takes up the profession, as well, at age 13.

== Reception ==
Jaya and Rasa was generally well-received by critics.

Booklist noted, Though the book admirably tackles myriad issues, it does seem to rush near the end. Readers’ hearts will ache to know more about the aftermath." They ultimately call Jaya and Rasa a "moving story of the healing powers of unconditional love."

Publishers Weekly wrote, "Readers may be surprised that half the book goes by before Rasa and Jaya even meet, but Patel ... writes with fierce simplicity throughout, allowing the gritty beauty of her story to shine."

BookPage pointed out the detail in Patel's writing, saying "the island of Oahu bursts from the page in vivid detail—from devastating poverty to the real-estate boom, from unparalleled natural beauty to drug-littered bus stops." Further, while

Jaya and Rasa are compelling characters in their own right, but when they finally meet, it’s as electrifying as Romeo and Juliet’s first dance. Patel has struck a balance of sensuality and youthful tenderness in their courtship, clearly conveying the difference between healthy and abusive sexual encounters. With an open-ended but hopeful final scene, Jaya and Rasa will appeal to teen readers hungry for more diverse—but still romantic—realistic fiction.

The novel has also been references in scholarly works: Breaking the Taboo with Young Adult Literature and International Journal of Young Adult Literature.

The book also received the following accolades:

- Book Riot's Best Queer Books of 2017
- In the Margins Book Award Recommended Fiction Book List (2019)
