= PEN/Phyllis Naylor Working Writer Fellowship =

The PEN/Phyllis Naylor Working Writer Fellowship is awarded by the PEN America (formerly PEN American Center) annually to a writer of children's or young-adult fiction of high literary caliber "at a crucial moment in his or her career to complete a book-length work-in-progress." The author receives $5,000 and was made possible by PEN member Phyllis Reynolds Naylor, the Newbery Medal winner of such books as Sang Spell and Shiloh.

The author must be nominated by an editor or a fellow writer and must have published "at least two novels for children or young adults which have been warmly received by literary critics, but have not generated sufficient income to support the author."

The award is one of many PEN awards sponsored by International PEN affiliates in over 145 PEN centers around the world. The PEN America awards have been characterized as being among the "major" American literary prizes.

== Award winners ==
PEN/Phyllis Naylor Working Writer Fellowship winners
Year	Author	Title	Ref.
2001	Graham McNamee	Sparks, published by Wendy Lamb Books in 2002	
2002	Lori Aurelia Williams	Broken China, published by Simon Pulse in 2006	
2003	Franny Billingsley	The Black Mountains (Available for Publication)	
2004	Deborah Wiles	[Untitled] (Available for Publication)	
2005	Amanda Jenkins	Night Road, published by Harper Teen in 2008	
2006	Barbara Shoup	Everything You Want, published by Flux Books in 2008	
2007	Diane Les Becquets	Genesis, published as Season of Ice by Bloomsbury in 2008	
2008	Theresa Nelson	Julia Delany: The American Version, published as The Year We Sailed the Sun by Atheneum Books in 2015	
2009	Carol Lynch Williams	A Glimpse Is All I Can Stand, published as Glimpse by Simon and Schuster in 2011	
2010	Pat Schmatz	Bluefish, published by Candlewick Press in 2011	
2011	Lucy Frank	Two Girls Staring at the Ceiling, published by Schwartz & Wade Books in 2014	
2012	Sarah Dooley	Free Verse, published by G.P. Putnam’s Sons in 2016	
2013	Amy Goldman Koss	The Intake Office (Available for Publication)	
2014	Linda Oatman High	The Taste of Elephant Tears, published by HarperCollins in 2017	
2015	Stephanie Kuehn	The Pragmatist forthcoming publication with Dutton	
2016	Ash Parsons	A Chemical Distance	
2017	Philippe Diederich	Finding Home at the End of the World	
2018	Vicky Shiefman	Help Me God, Please Pretty Please	
2019	Noni Carter	Womb Talk	
2020	Tiffany Parks	Saving Caravaggio	
2021	Arno Bohlmeijer	Scared—Mad—More!	
2022	Joy Jones	Walking the Boomerang	
2023	Lois Sepahban	Mulberry Trees	
2024	Jackie Sommers	How To Forgive an Island	
2025	H.D. Hunter	Rosewood	
