= The Story of Colors =

1999 picture book by Subcomandante Marcos

- Author: Subcomandante Marcos
- Illustrator: Domitilia Dominguez
- Genre: Children's picture book
- Publisher: Cinco Puntos Press
- Publication date: 1999
- ISBN: 0-938317-45-8
- OCLC: 40142948

The Story of Colors (La Historia de los Colores) is a children's book written by Subcomandante Marcos of the Zapatista Army of National Liberation. First published in 1996, it generated controversy after the National Endowment for the Arts canceled grant money for an illustrated bilingual edition in both Spanish and English. The Lannan Foundation stepped in with support after the NEA withdrew. The bilingual version was published in 1999, translated by Anne Bar Din with illustrations by Domitilia Dominguez.

After the NEA withdrew its support, National Public Radio featured the book on All Things Considered, as did The Nation and The New York Times.

The book received two Firecracker Alternative Book Awards: in 1999 in the "Special Recognition/Wildcard Category: Maybe the NEA Was Wrong" and in 2000 for "Outstanding Work for Kids."
