= Charm & Strange =

2013 young adult novel by Stephanie Kuehn

- Cover of Charm & Strange
- Author: Stephanie Kuehn
- Language: English
- Genre: Young adult literature, Mystery, Paranormal
- Publisher: St. Martin's Griffin
- Publication date: June 11th 2013
- Publication place: United States
- Media type: Print (hardcover, paperback)
- ISBN: 978-1-25- 002194-6

Charm & Strange is a young adult mystery novel with paranormal elements by Stephanie Kuehn, published June 11, 2013 by St. Martin's Griffin.

== Plot ==
The novel alternates between two timelines: present-day chapters labeled "Matter" and flashback chapters labeled "Antimatter."

In the present, sixteen-year-old Winston "Win" Winters attends an elite boarding school in rural Vermont, where he runs cross-country and keeps everyone at a distance. Haunted by a family tragedy that made national news, Win believes he is cursed—that there is a wolf inside him waiting to emerge. When a man's body is found brutally killed in the nearby woods, Win fears he may be responsible.

The present-day storyline unfolds over a single night at a secret party in a forest clearing. Win reluctantly attends with Jordan Herrera, a scholarship student and fellow runner who has taken an interest in him despite his hostility. His estranged former roommate Lex is also there. As the night progresses and Win grows increasingly unstable, Jordan and Lex try to understand what is happening to him.

The flashback chapters reveal Win's childhood as "Drew," a gifted but volatile tennis player from Virginia. Drew had an older brother, Keith, and a younger sister, Siobhan. The summer Drew turned ten, he and Keith visited their paternal grandparents in Massachusetts and spent time with their three teenage cousins. These memories gradually expose the dark reality of Drew's family: an abusive, predatory father and a household where children were not protected.

As the two timelines converge, the truth emerges. The "wolf" Win fears is not literal but a traumatic response—a "system of meaning" his young mind constructed to make sense of the child sexual abuse he suffered. His belief in the family werewolf curse was a way of understanding why his father hurt him and why, in the aftermath of the abuse being exposed, both Keith and Siobhan took their own lives.

By the novel's end, Win has a breakdown and is hospitalized. Jordan and Lex visit him and reveal that the death in the woods was caused by a black bear, not Win. With psychiatric help, Win begins to integrate his fractured identities—the childhood Drew and the isolated Win—into a new, more whole sense of self as Andrew. Though still deeply damaged, he takes his first steps toward healing and genuine human connection.

== Reception ==
Charm & Strange received positive reviews from Booklist, Publishers Weekly, The Horn Book, The Bulletin of the Center for Children's Books, and School Library Journal, as well as a mediocre review from Kirkus.

- YALSA's Popular Paperbacks for Young Adults Top Ten (2016)
- William C. Morris YA Debut Award (2014)
- Carnegie Medal Nominee (2014)
- California Book Award finalist (2014)
