= Edwin Sue Goree =

American librarian

Edwin Sue Goree (May 14, 1884 – June 11, 1961) was an American librarian and library organizer who advocated for the development of more robust local library programming in Texas.

== Biography ==
Edwin Sue Goree was born in Thorp Springs, Texas, on May 14, 1884, to Robert Daniel and Frances Rebecca (née Campbell) Goree. She attended the University of Texas for two years before becoming a librarian in 1908. She worked as a librarian at a library in Fort Bliss, Texas before moving to Iowa in 1919. She worked as the librarian in Davenport, Iowa until 1920 when she returned to Texas.

In the 1930s, acting as library organizer for the Texas State Library and executive secretary of the People's Library Movement for Texas, Goree pushed for the establishment of local libraries across the state, greater government support of school and local libraries, and more specific legislation and oversight providing resources to Texas libraries. She traveled across the state, involving herself in local community organizations and events, and organizing exhibits, and wrote articles and involved herself in organizations in order to advance her cause of more robust local and school libraries in Texas.

In 1937, Goree resigned from her position as library organizer in order to become executive secretary of the Texas Library Association, where funding from an anonymous donor enable her to work advancing libraries in Texas. In 1941 she started work as the founding librarian at the United States Naval Air Station Library in Corpus Christi. She worked at the Burnet County Free Library from 1949 through 1951, which was the last position she took in her career.

Goree died in Fort Worth on June 11, 1961.

== Selected publications ==
- Goree, Edwin Sue (1935). "Books in Texas Schools". Peabody Journal of Education. 12 (4): 197–199. ISSN 0161-956X.
- Goree, Edwin Sue (1942). "A Naval Air Station Library". Library Journal. 67 (10): 450.

== Awards and honors ==
The Texas Library Association awarded Goree their first Distinguished Service Award in 1960.
