= Xavier Garza =

American children's books author and illustrator

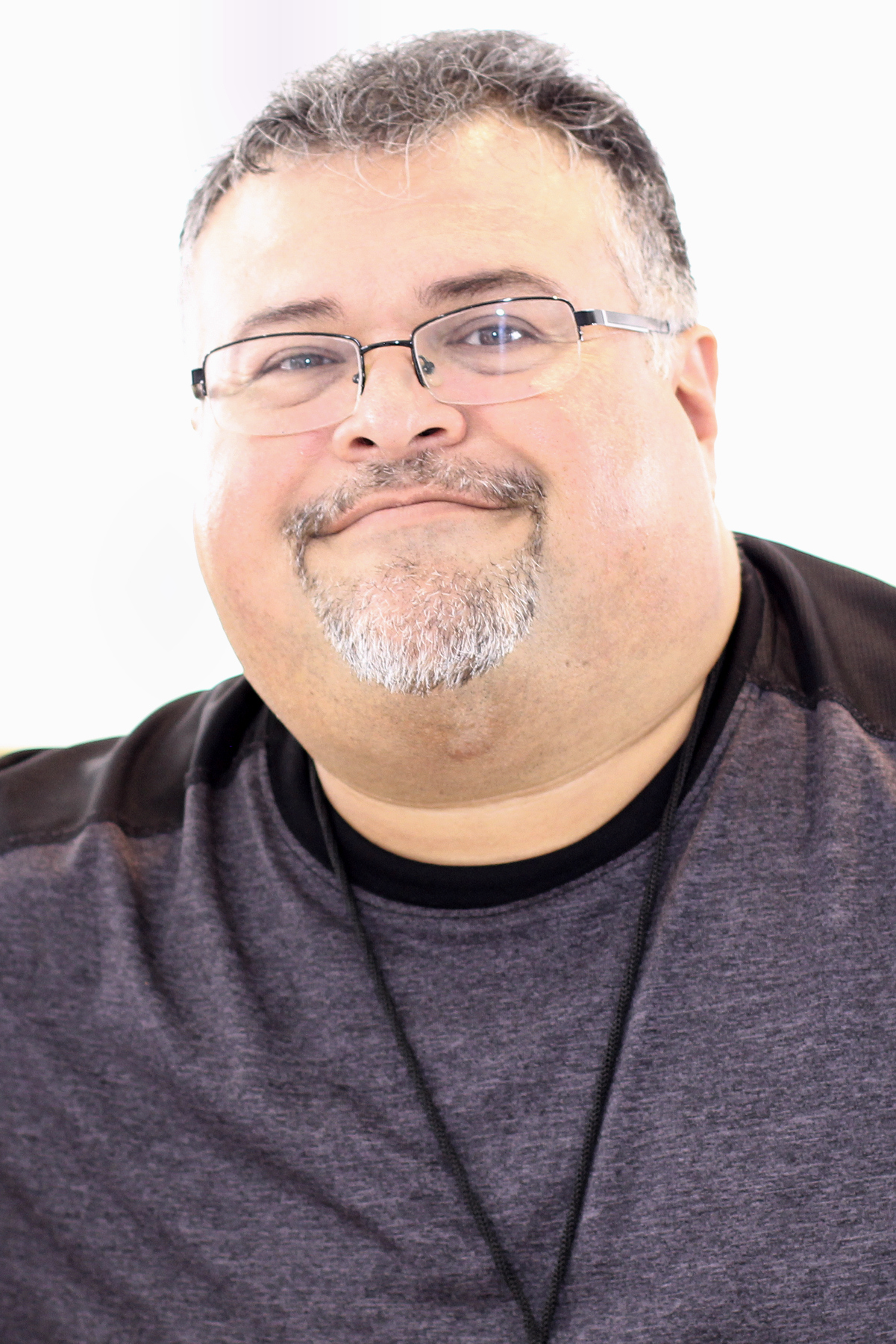
- Garza at the 2018 Texas Book Festival
- Born: October 14, 1968 (age 57); Rio Grande City, Texas
- Occupations: Author, Illustrator, Artist
- Writing career
- Genre: Children's literature

Xavier Garza (born 14 October 1968) is an author and illustrator of children's books and professor of art at Northwest Vista College in San Antonio.

== Life and career ==
Xavier Garza was born in Rio Grande City in Texas's Lower Rio Grande Valley in 1968. Growing up along the border in a Mexican-American family, he became intensely interested in both the spooky local folklore and the sport of lucha libre or Mexican wrestling. After receiving his BFA in art from the University of Texas Pan American in 1994, he became an art teacher. During the late 1990s and early 2000s, he began to exhibit his work in venues such as Talento Bilingue de Houston, Guadalupe Cultural Arts Center in San Antonio, Nuestra Palabra de Houston and various Mexican Consulates in the Rio Grande Valley and El Paso. Garza's art has also been displayed in The Institute of Texan Cultures in San Antonio, Mexic-Arte in Austin, Gallista Gallery in San Antonio, Coronado Studios in Austin, and The Ice House in Dallas, among many others.

After contributing to several anthologies in the early 2000s, Garza penned and illustrated his first children's book, Creepy Creatures and other Cucuys, which was published by Arte Público Press in 2004. Over the next decade, he went on to craft many other award-winning titles. His stories have also appeared in many periodicals, including El Mañana, The Monitor, TABE, The Corpus Christi Caller Times, Mesquite Review and the Milwaukee Spanish Journal .

In 2007, Xavier Garza received his MA in Art History and Criticism from the University of Texas at San Antonio. He presently resides in that city with his wife and son.

== Awards and honors ==
Garza's books have been widely acclaimed.

- Lucha Libre: Honor Book by the Americas Award, winner of the 2008-2009 Tejas Star Book Award
- Juan and the Chupacabras: winner of the 2007-2008 Tejas Star Book Award.
- Charro Claus and the Tejas Kid: winner of the 2009-2010 Tejas Star Book Award and finalist for both the 2011 Horace Mann Upstanders book award and the 2009 WLT Teddy Book Award.
- Maximilian and the Mystery of the Guardian Angel: a 2012 Pura Belpre Honor book award recipient.
- Maximilian and the Bingo Rematch: 2014 NAACS Tejas Young Adult Book Award and the 2014 Texas Institute of Letters Children's Book Award.

== Works ==
AS AUTHOR/ILLUSTRATOR

- Creepy Creatures and Other Cucuys. Houston: Arte Público Press. 2004.
- Lucha Libre: The Man in the Silver Mask: A Bilingual Cuento. El Paso, TX: Cinco Puntos Press, 2005
- Juan and the Chupacabras/ Juan y el Chupacabras. Houston, TX: Arte Público Press, 2006.
- Charro Claus and the Texas Kid. El Paso, TX: Cinco Puntos Press, 2008.
- Zulema and the Witch Owl / Zulema Y La Bruja Lechuza. Houston, TX: Arte Público, 2009.
- Kid Cyclone Fights the Devil and Other Stories / Kid Ciclon Se Enfrenta an El Diablo y Otras Historias. El Paso, TX: Cinco Puntos Press, 2010.
- Maximilian & the Mystery of the Guardian Angel: A Bilingual Lucha Libre Thriller. El Paso, TX: Cinco Puntos Press, 2012.
- Maximilian & the Bingo Rematch: A Lucha Libre Sequel. El Paso, TX: Cinco Puntos Press, 2013.
- The Great and Mighty Nikko. El Paso, TX: Cinco Puntos Press, 2015.
- The Donkey Lady Fights la Llorona and Other Stories. Arte Público Press, 2015.
- Maximilian & the Lucha Libre Club: A Bilingual Lucha Libre Thriller. El Paso, TX: Cinco Puntos Press, 2016.

AS ILLUSTRATOR

- The Sobbing Woman: La Llorona (Stories That Must Not Die #3). Juan Sauvageau, author. San Antonio, TX: NES, 2012.
- The Handsome Stranger: El guapo extranjero (Stories That Must Not Die, #6). Juan Sauvageau, author. San Antonio, TX: NES, 2012.
- The Hitchhiker of Highway 281. David Bowles, author. Killeen, TX: Overlooked Books, 2014.

AS CONTRIBUTOR

- Penn English: Chicano Writings. Penn State Press, 2001.
- Cantos al sexto sol: an Anthology of Aztlanahuac Writings. Cecilio García Camarillo, Roberto Rodríguez and Patricia Gonzalez, editors. San Antonio, Texas: Wings Press, 2002.
- Once Upon a Cuento. Lyn Miller-Lachmann, editor. Kirkland, WA: Curbstone Press, 2003.
- "Johnny Quick" in ¡Juventud! Growing up on the Border. René Saldaña, Jr. and Erika Garza-Johnson, editors. Donna, TX: VAO Publishing, 2013.
