= Doug Mankoff =

American film producer

Doug Mankoff is a producer and executive producer of fifteen independent films including Thirteen Conversations About One Thing and The Big Empty. He is currently the CEO of Echo Lake Entertainment, a production and financing company he founded in 1997. He is also member of both the Academy of Motion Picture Arts and Sciences and the Producers Guild of America.

He is a graduate of St. Mark's School of Texas, Duke, and Harvard Business School. He also attended the master's program at NYU Film School.
