= Stephanie Kuehn =

American author of young adult fiction

- Born: United States
- Education: BA in Linguistics, MA in Sports Psychology, PsyD in Clinical Psychology
- Alma mater: John F. Kennedy University, University of California, Santa Cruz
- Children: 3
- Writing career
- Language: English
- Years active: 2014-now
- Genre: young adult fiction
- Notable works: Charm & Strange, Delicate Monsters, Complicit
- Notable awards: William C. Morris Award 2014, Northern California Book Award 2016
- Website: stephaniekuehn.com

Stephanie Kuehn is an American author of young adult fiction, best known for her William C. Morris Award-winning debut novel Charm & Strange, Delicate Monsters, and Complicit. Her novels often explore themes of mental illness and psychology.

== Personal life ==
Kuehn wanted to be a filmmaker as a teen and grew up in Berkeley, California. She grew up reading books by V.C. Andrews and Peter Straub.

Kuehn attended John F. Kennedy University and the University of California, Santa Cruz. She has a bachelor's degree in linguistics, a master's degree in sports psychology, and a doctorate in clinical psychology.

Her background as a psychologist is one of the reasons why many of her novels have narrators who are dealing with mental health issues.

She currently lives in Northern California with her husband and three children.

== Selected works ==
Her debut young adult novel, Charm & Strange, was published by St. Martin's Griffin in 2014 and tells the story of a teenage athlete who believes he might be a werewolf. Charm & Strange won the William C. Morris Award in 2014 and was nominated for a Carnegie Medal in 2014.

Delicate Monsters, her sophomore novel, about the intersecting lives of three troubled teenagers, was published in 2015 by St. Martin's Griffin. It won the Northern California Book Award in the category Children's Fiction for Older Readers in 2016.

Her third novel, Complicit, about a teen dealing with the aftermath of his sister burning down a barn and being sentenced to juvenile detention, was published by St. Martin's Griffin in 2016. Complicit was also on Booklist's 2014 Top 10 Crime Fiction for Youth, the 2015 Reading List of the Texas Library Association, YALSA's 2015 Top Ten Best Fiction for Young Adults list, and YALSA's 2017 Popular Paperbacks for Young Adults list. Complicit was also nominated for a Kentucky Bluegrass Award in 2016 and a Rhode Island Teen Book Award in 2016.

Kuehn's fourth novel, The Smaller Evil, is about a teen who arrives at a self-help center to deal with his anxiety and chronic illness, but stumbled into strange happenings when the retreat leader appears not to be who he seems. The Smaller Evil was published by Dutton in 2016. It received a starred review from School Library Journal Kuehn was awarded the PEN/Phyllis Naylor Working Writer Fellowship for The Smaller Evil in 2015.

Her fifth novel, When I Am Through With You, was published by Dutton in 2017. It received a starred review from Kirkus magazine.

== Bibliography ==
=== Young adult novels ===
- Charm & Strange (St. Martin's Griffin, 2014)
- Delicate Monsters (St. Martin's Griffin, 2015)
- Complicit (St. Martin's Griffin, 2016)
- The Smaller Evil (Dutton, 2016)
- When I Am Through With You (Dutton, 2017)
- We Weren't Looking to Be Found (Disney-Hyperion, 2022)

=== Short stories ===
- in Feral Youth, edited by Shaun David Hutchinson (Simon Pulse, 2017)
- in (Don't) Call Me Crazy, edited by Kelly Jensen (Algonquin, 2018)
- in His Hideous Heart, edited by Dahlia Adler (Flatiron, 2019)

== Awards ==
Year	Title	Award	Result	Ref.
2014	Charm & Strange	William C. Morris Award	Winner	
2014	Charm & Strange	Carnegie Medal	Nominee	
2016	Delicate Monsters	Northern California Book Award, Children's Fiction for Older Readers	Winner	
2016	Complicit	Kentucky Bluegrass Award	Nominee	
2016	Complicit	Rhode Island Teen Book Award	Nominee	
