= Vanishing Girls =

2015 young adult novel by Lauren Oliver

- Cover of Vanishing Girls
- Author: Lauren Oliver
- Language: English
- Genre: Young adult literature, Romance, Mystery, Thriller
- Publisher: HarperCollins
- Publication date: March 10, 2015
- Publication place: United States
- Media type: Print (hardcover, paperback)
- ISBN: 978-0-06-222410-1

Vanishing Girls is a young adult mystery novel by Lauren Oliver, published March 10, 2015 by HarperCollins.

== Reception ==
Vanishing Girls received a starred review from Publishers Weekly, positive reviews from School Library Journal, Common Sense Media, MTV, and Booklist, and a mediocre review from Kirkus.

The book also received the following accolades:

- YALSA's Popular Paperbacks for Young Adults Top Ten (2017)
- Publishers Weekly Picks
