= All the Bright Places =

2014 novel by Jennifer Niven

- Author: Jennifer Niven
- Audio read by: Ariadne Meyers, Jennifer Niven, Kirby Heyborne
- Language: English and school
- Genre: Young Adult Realistic fiction
- Set in: America
- Published: January 6, 2015
- Publisher: Knopf Publishing Group
- Publication place: United States
- Media type: Print (hardback, paperback), e-book, audiobook
- Pages: 388 pages
- ISBN: 0385755880

All the Bright Places is a young adult fiction novel by Jennifer Niven which is based on the author's personal story. The novel was first published on January 6, 2015, through Knopf Publishing Group and is Niven's first young adult book. A film adaptation starring Elle Fanning and Justice Smith was released on February 28, 2020, on Netflix.

== Plot summary ==
Theodore Finch and Violet Markey are two teenagers who badly want to escape from their small Indiana town of Bartlett. Violet is a popular girl who is secretly dealing with survivor's guilt, and Finch is a boy obsessed with death, labeled a freak by his peers. Fate brings the two together when both climbed the bell tower at school at the same time, planning to jump off the ledge. Finch was surprised to see Violet up there because she is one of the most popular girls in the school. However, Violet has been dealing with the death of her sister, Eleanor, who died 9 months previously in a car accident after Violet suggested the route home. Having not been in a car since the accident, Violet feels responsible and thinks she should have died instead of Eleanor. Violet quit the student council, then cheerleading. On the ledge, Finch talks Violet down, and Violet returns the favor, but everyone assumes it's Violet who saved Finch.

As for Finch, he has depression and experiences near-constant thoughts of suicide during his so-called "Awake" periods. Finch's family does not understand his depression, making him feel isolated. Morbidly, he writes out fun facts about other people's suicides on his computer, as well as methods of suicide and the best way to die. Finch initiates a partnership between himself and Violet for a school project in which they will explore their home state of Indiana together. Later, at home, Finch thinks about Violet, looking her up on Facebook, reading about her sister's accident (which he had forgotten), and chatting online with her.

For their project, Finch and Violet travel around Indiana to see important or unusual sites. They see homemade roller coasters, the highest hill in Indiana (Hoosier Hill), and more. The important thing doesn't seem to be the sites themselves, but what the wandering begins to mean for both of them—especially Violet. The two begin a romantic relationship and fall in love. Eventually, Finch pushes Violet to get in the car and begin writing again, for the first time after her sister's accident nine months prior. He helps her begin to talk about her sister's death, which her parents have not managed to do. As a result, Violet begins to heal.

However, Finch's mental health begins to deteriorate. He has an undiagnosed bipolar disorder and therefore, deals with very high highs and very low lows. His behavior demonstrates the characteristic manic periods of impulsive excitability as well as the lethargic, pointless mindset during the depressive periods. He is also physically abused by his father and bullied at school. Additionally, Finch refuses to be diagnosed because the labels make him feel trapped. The one shining spot in his life is his blossoming relationship with Violet.

The teenagers wander around Indiana together some more; however, on one occasion they accidentally stay out until the next morning, angering Violet's parents who forbid their daughter from seeing Finch again.

This begins a downward spiral for Finch, who ends up getting expelled from school after a fight with Violet's ex-boyfriend. Although he still sees Violet on occasion, Finch is easily able to hide his worsening depression from her. Violet doesn't realize the seriousness of the situation and wonders if Finch is losing interest in her.

One particularly bad night, Finch decides to end his life. He takes a handful of sleeping pills, but almost immediately regrets it. He goes to the emergency room and gets his stomach pumped. After that, he tries to get help through a suicide support group in a nearby town. There, he runs into Amanda, a popular student he knows from school. She is concerned about Finch's suicide attempt and tells Violet about it. Violet is obviously worried and tries to help though Finch explodes, angry at her concern, which leads to a big fight.

After their argument, Finch runs away from home, and Violet seems to be the only one looking for him. He sends her mysterious and cryptic texts while he visits the remaining locations for their unfinished school project, although Violet doesn't understand them until much later, thinking Finch was just being rudely cryptic.

A month after he has disappeared, Finch sends an email to every single person he knows, saying goodbye. Violet, in a panic, figures out that he has drowned himself at the Blue Hole, one of their wandering sites for the school project. She goes there and discovers she is right, and she becomes distraught. Later, she manages to decode the texts Finch had sent her, and at the last location they were supposed to visit together, Finch wrote a song for her. This helps the healing process and convinces Violet that Finch's death was not her fault. The book closes with Violet going swimming by herself in the Blue Hole, where she went swimming with Finch, bringing her a sense of peace.

== Writing style ==
All the Bright Places is written in a subjective style from the point of view of the two main characters, Finch and Violet. The novel is composed of short sections narrated by Finch and Violet, that generally alternate between the two characters. This writing style allows readers to understand the changes in Violet as she heals from her sister's death and Finch as he progressively becomes more mentally ill throughout the novel.

== Reception ==
The New York Times put All the Bright Places in the company of Rainbow Rowell's Eleanor & Park and John Green The Fault in Our Stars in that "Violet and Finch are the archetypal offering in contemporary young adult fiction: a pair of damaged, heart-tugging teenagers who are at once outcasts and isolated, trapped by the dissonant alchemy of their combined fates." The New York Daily News claims "All the Bright Places draws you in and makes you cry with the compelling story of two teens, Violet and Finch. The story of Violet and Finch's quest to find 'All the Bright Places' is one that anyone can relate to". Entertainment Weekly and The Guardian both gave ultimately favorable reviews for the work, with The Guardian writing "Niven’s first foray into Young Adult fiction lacks narrative tension but has plenty of emotional heft".

All the Bright Places won the 2015 Goodreads Choice Award for Best Young Adult fiction and the #1 Kids' Indie Next Book for Winter '14-'15. The novel has also been awarded for Children's Choice Book Awards Teen Book of the Year and 2016 Mare di Libri Book Prize for Best YA Book. It has been nominated for the Carnegie Medal and longlisted for the Guardian Children's Fiction Book. It won the 2017 Eliot Rosewater Indiana High School Book Award.
