= Lauren Castillo =

American author and illustrator

Lauren Castillo is an author and illustrator of children's literature. In 2015, she won the Caldecott Honor for her watercolor illustrations in her book Nana in the City.

In 2005, she graduated from the School of Visual Arts. Her first self-written and self-illustrated book, Melvin and the Boy, was published in 2011. In 2012, her work was exhibited at the Bruce Museum in their "Let It Snow! Children’s Book Art" show. In 2020, Castillo's book Our Friend Hedgehog: The Story of Us was published, which is planned as the first book in a series.

== Selected works ==
=== As writer and illustrator ===
- Melvin and the Boy (2011)
- The Troublemaker (2014)
- Nana in the City (2014)
- Our Friend Hedgehog: The Story of Us (2020)

=== As illustrator ===
- What Happens on Wednesdays (2007) - by Emily Jenkins
- Buffalo Music (2008) - by Tracey E. Fern
- The Reader (2012) - by Amy Hest
- City Cat (2013)- by Kate Banks
- Twenty Yawns - by Jane Smiley (2016)
- Imagine (2018) - by Juan Felipe Herrera
