= Jennifer Niven =

American novelist

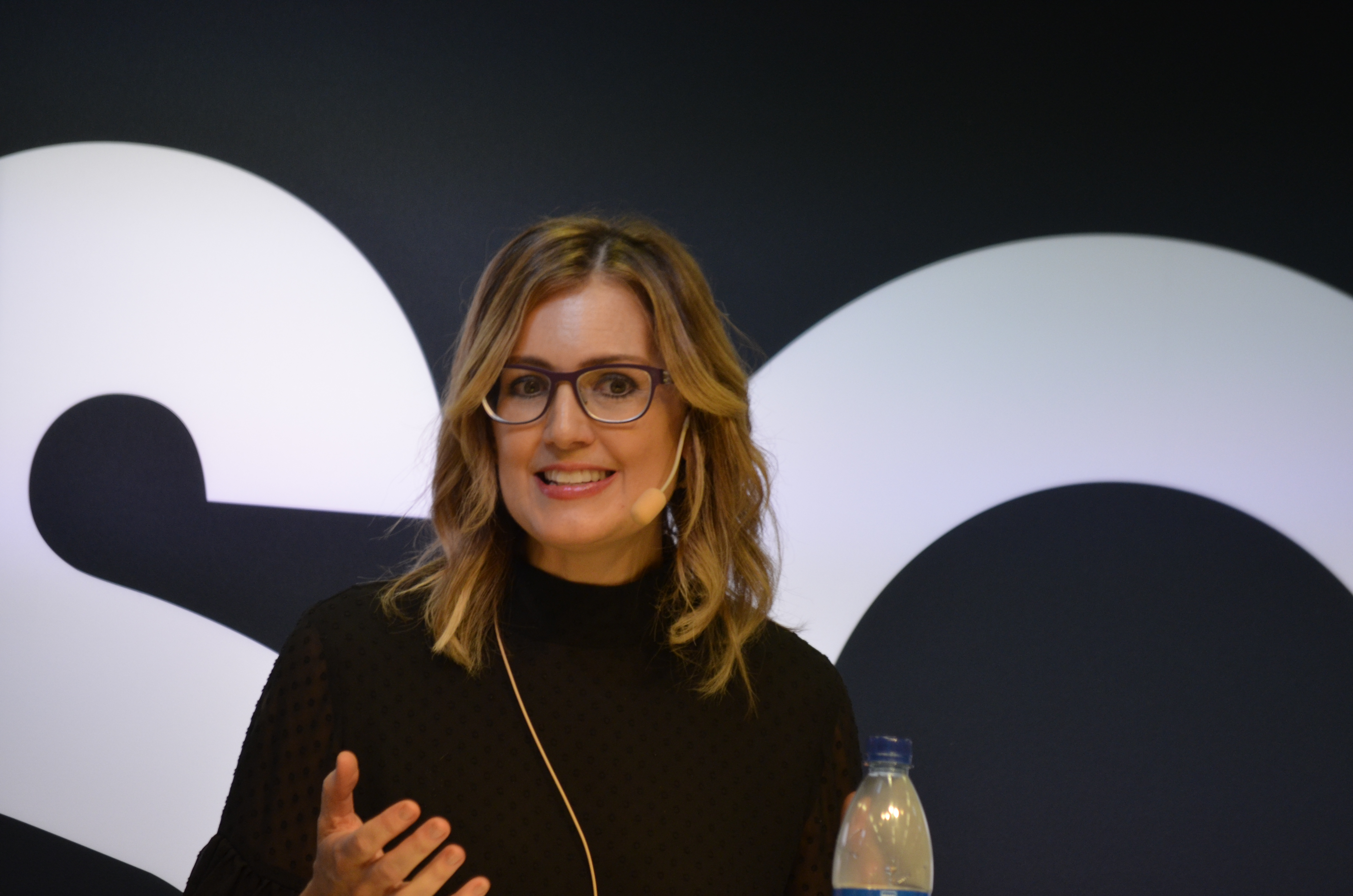
- Occupations: Author, Screenwriter
- Spouse: Justin Conway
- Writing career
- Years active: 2000–present
- Notable work: All the Bright Places
- Website: www.jenniferniven.com

Jennifer Niven is a New York Times and international best selling American author who is best known for the 2015 young adult book All the Bright Places.

== Life and career ==
Jennifer Niven grew up in Richmond, Indiana. As well as writing novels, Niven has also worked as a screenwriter, a journalist, and as an associate producer at ABC Television.

Her first two books were non-fiction narratives, called The Ice Master (published in 2000) and Ada Blackjack: A True Story of Survival in the Arctic (published in 2003). In 2010, she published a memoir of her years in high school, called The Aqua Net Diaries: Big Hair, Big Dreams, Small Town.

She began writing a series of historical novels, in 2009. The first, Velva Jean Learns to Drive, was based on a short film of the same name that she had made. It won an Emmy Award and the Colin Higgins Award for Screenwriting. The series also includes Velva Jean Learns to Fly, Becoming Clementine, and American Blonde.

Niven's first young adult novel, All the Bright Places, was released in 2015. The narrative follows two teenagers, Violet and Finch, who are struggling with mental health issues. It won a 2015 Goodreads choice award for Best Young Adult Fiction and was longlisted for the 2015 Guardian Children's Fiction Prize. It has been adapted into a film by Netflix and stars Elle Fanning, Justice Smith, Alex Haydon, Keegan-Michael Key, Alexandra Shipp, and Luke Wilson. Production on the film began in October 2018, and it was released on 28 February 2020.

She released another bestselling young adult novel, in 2016, called Holding Up the Universe, and her third young adult novel, Breathless, was released in September 2020. The author released When We Were Monsters in September 2025 and Meet the Newmans in January 2026.

== Bibliography ==
Young Adult

- All the Bright Places (2015) ISBN 0385755880
- Holding Up the Universe (2016) ISBN 0385755929
- Breathless (2020)
- Take Me With You When You Go with David Levithan (2021)

Velva Jean Series

- Velva Jean Learns to Drive (2009) ISBN 0452289459
- Velva Jean Learns to Fly (2011) ISBN 0452297400
- Becoming Clementine (2012) ISBN 0452298105
- American Blonde (2014) ISBN 0452298210

Non-fiction

- The Ice Master (2000) ISBN 0786884460
- Ada Blackjack: A True Story of Survival in the Arctic (2003) ISBN 0786868635
- The Aqua Net Diaries: Big Hair, Big Dreams, Small Town (2010) ISBN 1416954295
