= Robin Benway =

American writer

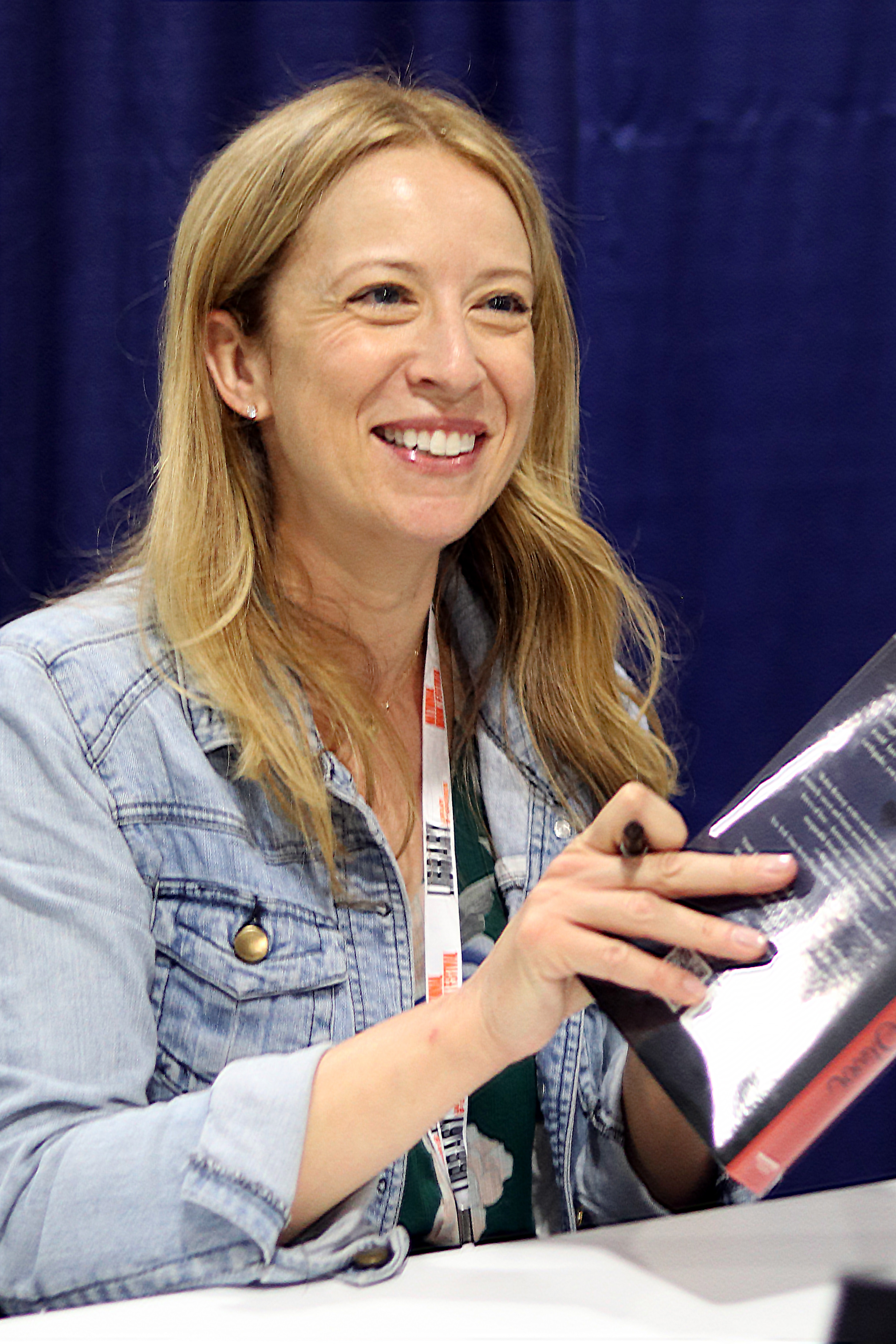
- Benway at the 2018 U.S. National Book Festival
- Education: New York University; University of California, Los Angeles
- Writing career
- Genre: Young adult fiction
- Notable works: Audrey, Wait!

Robin Benway is an author of young adult fiction from Orange County, California, US, most known for her novel Far from the Tree, which won the 2017 National Book Award for Young People's Literature.

== Early life ==
She started her career in the publishing industry initially working as a book publicist and sales rep, coordinating events at BookSoup in Los Angeles. Feeling inspired, she quit her job and started applying to writing programs.

She attended college at both New York University and the University of California at Los Angeles. Benway was rejected from every Master of Fine Arts program she applied to. When she wasn't accepted, she instead took a writing class at UCLA Extension taught by Rachel Cohn, where she wrote the first chapter of her eventual debut novel Audrey, Wait.

== Career ==
=== Also Known As series (2013–2014) ===
==== Plot ====
The series is about a former code cracker and member of a secret association. The first novel, Also Known As, was published by Simon & Schuster in 2013, and in the UK as Sleuth or Dare in 2014.

==== Reception ====
Reviews were quite mixed. The guardian called the second book, Also Known As/Sleuth or Dare, "not one of Benway's best novels", due to its confusing story. Publishers Weekly said " readers will be sufficiently invested to see the mission through to completion." School Library Journal reviewed the audiobook and recommended it for teenagers who enjoy mysteries.

=== Far From the Tree (2017) ===
==== Plot ====
Far From the Tree is about three siblings who reconnect 15 years after were adopted, and thus separated. When one of them, 16-year-old Grace gives up her baby for adoption, she feels the desire to reconnect with her biological family.

==== Background ====
She drew on the relationship to her brother for inspiration. The book is also dedicated to him.

==== Reception ====
The novel was met with positive reviews. Kirkus Reviews called it a "compassionate, funny, moving, compulsively readable novel." It also won the 2017 National Book Award for Young People's Literature, and received a starred review from Publishers Weekly. School Library Journal called it "Well-written and accessible."

=== The Wicked Ones (2023) ===
==== Plot ====
The first in a new series of fairytale retellings, The Wicked Ones is a retelling of the story of Cinderella, as experienced through the eyes of her stepsisters. It was published by Disney Press in January 2023

==== Reception ====
Kirkus Reviews called it "psychologically astute entertainment with a bite," while School Library Journal called it a "secondary purchase", but suitable for Disney fans.

== Bibliography ==
=== Also Known As series ===
- Also Known As (2013)
- Going Rogue (2014)

=== Standalones ===
- Audrey, Wait! (2008)
- The Extraordinary Secrets of April, May & June (2010)
- Emmy & Oliver (2015)
- Far from the Tree (2017)
- A Year to the Day (2022)
- The Wicked Ones (2023)
- Royal Spin (2026)
