= E. Lockhart =

American writer (born 1967)

Emily Jenkins
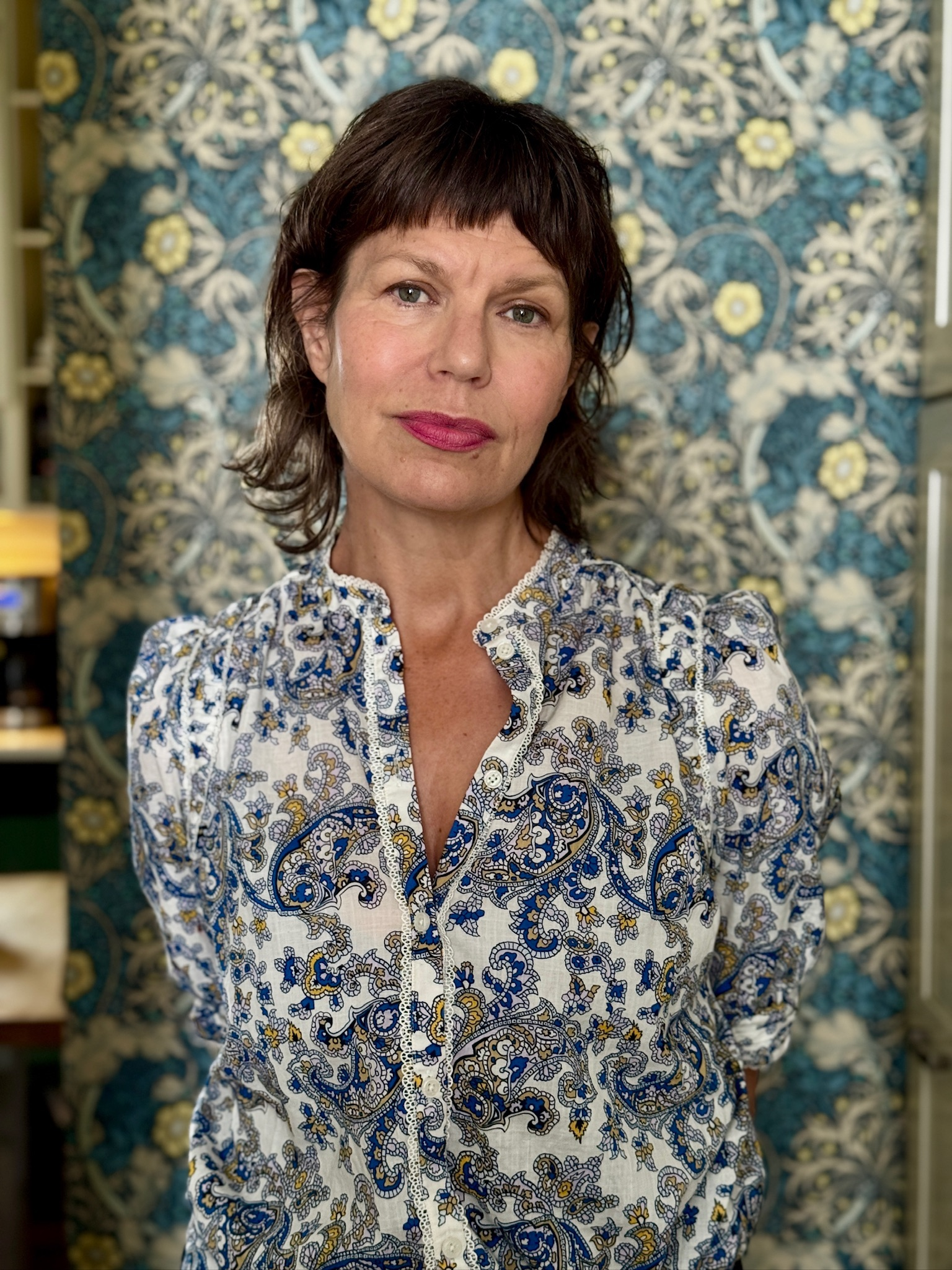
- Jenkins in 2025
- Born: September 13, 1967 (age 59); New York City, New York
- Occupation: Writer
- Spouse: Daniel Aukin
- Writing career
- Pen name: E. Lockhart
- Period: 1996–present
- Genres: Children's picture books, young adult fiction
- Notable works: The Boyfriend List (Ruby Oliver series); The Disreputable History of Frankie Landau-Banks
- Website: emilyjenkins.com

Emily Jenkins (born September 13, 1967), who sometimes uses the pen name E. Lockhart, is an American writer of children's picture books, young adult novels, and adult fiction. She is best known for the novels The Disreputable History of Frankie Landau-Banks and We Were Liars; the latter was adapted into a television series in 2025. Her father, Len Jenkin, is a playwright.

== Personal life ==
Jenkins was born in New York City, and grew up in Cambridge, Massachusetts, and Seattle, Washington. In high school, she attended summer drama schools at Northwestern University and the Children's Theatre Company in Minneapolis. She attended Lakeside School, a private high school in North Seattle. She went to Vassar College, where she studied illustrated books and interviewed Barry Moser for her senior thesis, and she attended graduate school at Columbia University, where she earned a doctorate in English literature.

== Writer ==
Jenkins writes as E. Lockhart for the young adult market. “Lockhart" was the family name of her maternal grandmother. Her first book under her pen name was The Boyfriend List, published in 2005 by Random House Dell Delacorte Press. There are three sequels: The Boy Book (2006), The Treasure Map of Boys (2009), and Real Live Boyfriends (2010); the four are also known, collectively, as the Ruby Oliver novels, after their central protagonist. Another novel for teens, The Disreputable History of Frankie Landau-Banks (2008), was a finalist for both the National Book Award for Young People's Literature and the Michael L. Printz Award. We Were Liars made the shortlist of four books for the 2014 Guardian Children's Fiction Prize. The annual prize, judged by British children's writers, recognizes the year's best U.K. published book by a writer who has not previously won it.

Under her real name, Jenkins has collaborated with illustrators to produce children's books and picture books. They have received honors such as the Oppenheim Toy Portfolio Platinum Book Award (the original Toys Go Out, illustrated by Paul O. Zelinsky) and two runners-up for Boston Globe–Horn Book Award (Five Creatures, illus. Tomek Bogacki, and That New Animal, illus. Pierre Pratt).

== Works ==
=== Children's books by Emily Jenkins ===
- The Secret Life of Billie's Uncle Myron, co-written with her father Len Jenkin (no 's') (Macmillan/Henry Holt BYR, 1996) – "a middle-grade fantasy adventure novel with lots of jokes" OCLC 34245145
- Five Creatures, illustrated by Tomek Bogacki, (Farrar, Straus and Giroux/Frances Foster, 2001)
- My Favorite Thing (According to Alberta), illustrated by Anna Laura Cantone (Simon & Schuster/Anne Schwartz, 2004)
- Daffodil, illustrated by Tomek Bogacki (FSG/Frances Foster, 2004)
- That New Animal, illustrated by Pierre Pratt (FSG/FF, 2005)
- Daffodil, Crocodile, illustrated by Tomek Bogacki (FSG/FF, 2006)
- Love You When You Whine, illustrated by Sergio Ruzzier (FSG/FF, 2006)
- Toys Go Out: Being the Adventures of a Knowledgeable Stingray, a Toughy Little Buffalo, and Someone called Plastic, illustrated by Paul O. Zelinsky (Random House/Schwartz & Wade, 2006) – a book of stories
- Bea and Haha board books, illustrated by Tomek Bogacki (FSG/FF, 2006): 1. Num, num, num!; 2. Hug, hug, hug!; 3. Plonk, plonk, plonk!; 4. Up, up, up!
- What Happens on Wednesdays, illustrated by Lauren Castillo (FSG/FF, 2007)
- Skunkdog, illustrated by Pierre Pratt (FSG/Frances Foster, 2008)
- The Little Bit Scary People, illustrated by Alexandra Boiger (Hyperion BFC, 2008)
- Toy Dance Party: Being the Further Adventures of a Bossy-Boots Stingray, a Courageous Buffalo, and a Hopeful Round Someone called Plastic, illustrated by Paul O. Zelinsky (2008)
- Sugar Would Not Eat It, illustrated by Giselle Potter (Schwartz & Wade, 2009)
- Small Medium Large, illustrated by Tomek Bogacki (Cambridge, MA: Star Bright Books, 2011)
- Toys Come Home: Being the Early Experiences of an Intelligent Stingray, a Brave Buffalo, and a Brand-New Someone called Plastic, illustrated by Paul O. Zelinsky (Schwartz & Wade, 2011)
- Invisible Inkling, illustrated by Harry Bliss (HarperCollins/Balzer + Bray, 2011) – a novel
- Lemonade in Winter: A Book About Two Kids Counting Money, illustrated by G. Brian Karas (Schwartz & Wade, 2012)
- Dangerous Pumpkins, illustrated by Harry Bliss (HarperCollins/Balzer + Bray, 2012) – Invisible Inkling #2
- The Whoopie Pie War, illustrated by Harry Bliss (HarperCollins/Balzer + Bray, 2013) – Invisible Inkling #3
- Water in the Park, illustrated by Stephanie Graegin (Schwartz & Wade, 2013)
- A Fine Dessert, illustrated by Sophie Blackall (Schwartz & Wade, 2014)
- Princessland, illustrated by Barbara McClintock (FSG/FF, 2014)
- Toys Meet Snow: Being the Wintertime Adventures of a Curious Stuffed Buffalo, a Sensitive Plush Stingray, and a Book-Loving Rubber Ball, illustrated by Paul O. Zelinsky (Schwartz & Wade, 2015)
- The Fun Book of Scary Stuff illustrated by Hyewon Yum (FSG, 2015)
- Tiger and Badger, illustrated by Marie-Louise Gay (Candlewick, 2016)
- The Kitten Story illustrated by Brittany Cicchese
- A Greyhound, A Groundhog illustrated by Chris Appelhans

=== Adult books by Emily Jenkins ===
- Tongue First: Adventures in Physical Culture (1998) – essays
- Mister Posterior and the Genius Child (Berkley Books, 2002) – a novel

=== Young adult books by E. Lockhart ===
- Fly on the Wall: How One Girl Saw Everything (Delacorte BYR, 2006) – young-adult contemporary fantasy
- Dramarama (Hyperion, 2007)
- The Disreputable History of Frankie Landau-Banks (Hyperion, 2008)
- Genuine Fraud (Delacorte, 2017)
- Again Again (Delacorte, 2020)

==== Ruby Oliver series ====
- The Boyfriend List:15 Guys, 11 Shrink Appointments, 4 Ceramic Frogs, and Me, Ruby Oliver) (Random House/Delacorte Press, 2005)
  - This novel has been suggested as a great novel to co-teach with The Scarlet Letter for high school students.
- The Boy Book: A Study of Habits and Behaviors, Plus Techniques for Taming Them (Delacorte, 2006)
- The Treasure Map of Boys: Noel, Jackson, Finn, Hutch, Gideon, and Me, Ruby Oliver (Delacorte, 2009)
- Real Live Boyfriends: Yes, Boyfriends, Plural, if my Life weren't Complicated, I wouldn't be Ruby Oliver (2010) – Ruby Oliver #4 (senior year), the finale

==== Liars series ====
- We Were Liars (Delacorte, 2014)
- Family of Liars (Delacorte, 2022)
- We Fell Apart (Delacorte, 2025)

=== As a co-author ===
- How To Be Bad (HarperTeen, 2008), by Lockhart, Sarah Mlynowski, and Lauren Myracle
- The Upside-Down Magic series (by Sarah Mlynowski, Lauren Myracle, and Emily Jenkins)
1. Upside-Down Magic
2. Sticks & Stones
3. Showing Off
4. Dragon Overnight
5. Weather or Not
6. The Big Shrink

== Awards ==
Year	Book	Award	Result	Ref.
2006	The Boyfriend List: 15 Guys, 11 Shrink Appointments, 4 Ceramic Frogs, and me Ruby Oliver	Quick Picks for Reluctant Young Adult Readers	Selection	
2008	The Disreputable History of Frankie Landau-Banks	Cybils Award for Best Young Adult Novel	Winner	
2008	The Disreputable History of Frankie Landau-Banks	National Book Award for Young People's Literature	Finalist	
2008	Dramarama	Best Books for Young Adults	Selection	
2008	Fly on the Wall: How One Girl Saw Everything	Popular Paperbacks for Young Adults	Selection	
2009	The Disreputable History of Frankie Landau-Banks	Amelia Bloomer Book List	Selection	
2009	The Disreputable History of Frankie Landau-Banks	Best Books for Young Adults	Selection	
2009	The Disreputable History of Frankie Landau-Banks	Michael L. Printz Award	Honor	
2009	The Disreputable History of Frankie Landau-Banks	Teens’ Top Ten	Top 10	
2009	Dramarama	Popular Paperbacks for Young Adults	Selection	
2010	The Treasure Map of Boys: Noel, Jackson, Finn, Hutch--And Me, Ruby Oliver	Best Books for Young Adults	Selection	
2011	The Boy Book: A Study of Habits and Behaviors, Plus Techniques for Taming Them	Amazing Audiobooks for Young Adults	Selection	
2013	The Disreputable History of Frankie Landau-Banks	Popular Paperbacks for Young Adults	Top 10	
2014	We Were Liars	Goodreads Choice Award for Young Adult Fiction	Winner	
2015	We Were Liars	Amazing Audiobooks for Young Adults	Selection	
2015	We Were Liars	Best Books for Young Adults	Top 10	
2015	We Were Liars	Inky Awards	Silver	
2018	Genuine Fraud	Inky Awards	Silver	
2018	Genuine Fraud	Amazing Audiobooks for Young Adults	Selection	
2022	Whistle: A New Gotham City Hero	Sydney Taylor Book Award for Young Adult	Honor	
2022	Whistle: A New Gotham City Hero	Great Graphic Novels for Teens	Selection	
