= The Disreputable History of Frankie Landau-Banks =

2008 young-adult novel by E. Lockhart

- First edition
- Author: E. Lockhart
- Language: English
- Genre: Teen novel humor fiction
- Publisher: Disney-Hyperion
- Publication date: 2008
- Publication place: United States of America
- Media type: Print (hardcover, paperback)
- Pages: 352 pages
- ISBN: 978-0786838196
- OCLC: 182525916

The Disreputable History of Frankie Landau-Banks is a young-adult novel written by American author E. Lockhart. It was published on the 25 March 2008 by Disney-Hyperion.

It centers around the main character of Frances 'Frankie' Landau-Banks and her sophomore year at a boarding school, exploring the themes of feminism, class and privilege, and friendship and loyalty.

It won a Michael L. Printz Honor Award in 2009.

== Plot ==
Frankie Landau-Banks is a sophomore at Alabaster Prep when she encounters the Loyal Order of the Basset Hounds, an all-male secret society. Since she is a girl and thus cannot join, she feels left out of the society. When one of the leaders, Alpha, leaves school for a few days, she seizes the opportunity to direct the Basset Hounds in several pranks.

== Main characters ==
- Frankie Landau-Banks – Frankie, the protagonist of this book, is a sophomore girl who is in a growing phase both physically and intellectually. She begins to focus on her independence and desperately wants to resist being defined by anyone but herself, including her boyfriend Matthew Livingston. Along the way Frankie learns to take matters into her own hands when she is unfairly left out of The Basset Hounds. Her solution for this dilemma leads to much trouble and hilarity.
- Matthew Livingston – Matthew is the confident, wealthy, cool, and older boy who goes from being Frankie's crush to her boyfriend. When we are first introduced to his character he seems to be the perfect knight in shining armor. As a leading member of the all-male secret society of The Basset Hounds, he represents the world Frankie is kept out of and is happy enough to leave her out of his conformist "old boys" club.
- Alpha – As his name suggests, Alpha sees himself as the lead dog on campus. Because of his confidence and leadership abilities many others also see him this way. Throughout the book he is at odds with Frankie over the attention of his best friend Matthew. When he feels threatened by Frankie he uses his power to make Frankie feel small and unimportant in the group because she is a girl trying to fit in with the all boys group.
- Zada Landau-Banks – Zada is the older advice giving sister of Frankie. Whenever Frankie has a problem she calls her older sister, who calms her down but also shares with Frankie some of her feminist inclinations.
- Porter Welsch – Porter is Frankie's ex-boyfriend who is also a part of The Loyal Order of The Basset Hounds. Porter seems to always be in Frankie's way just to antagonize her, but as it turns out Frankie and Porter have something in common because they both reject the conformity that seems to be required by their school.

== Reception ==
=== Reviews ===
Kirkus Reviews calls the novel a "funny feminist manifesto that will delight" through its "adroit, insightful examination" of adolescent dilemmas.

The Guardian praises Lockhart's use of style in her writing to emphasise Frankie's unique outlook and character, as well as the prose style allowing for subtlety with the themes. It notes the novel to be "surprisingly thought provoking for a range of age groups and worth reading".

The Horn Book Magazine points to the direct clinically-sounding narration presenting Frankie's struggles in a "dispassionate and case-study way", which in effect leaves the reader to make up their own mind.

Common Sense Media notes that the plot and setting works well, however it seems to be grasping for a message that never follows through, concluding that "readers may feel not quite satisfied".

Publishers Weekly praises how Lockhart juggles smart and tantalizing themes while combining "the pacing of a mystery with writing that realizes settings and characters", noting that the "exuberant, mischievous story scores its points memorably and lastingly".

=== Awards ===
Year	Award	Result	Ref.
2008	National Book Award for Young People's Literature	Finalist	
2008	Cybils Award for Best Young Adult Novel	Winner	
2009	Michael L. Printz Award	Honor	
