= Justice Smith =

American actor (born 1995)

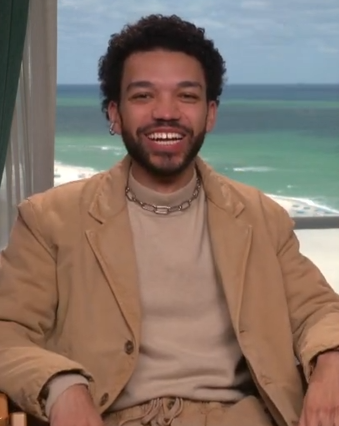
- Smith in 2025
- Born: Justice Elio Smith; August 9, 1995 (age 31); Los Angeles, California, US
- Occupation: Actor
- Years active: 2012–present

Justice Elio Smith (born August 9, 1995) is an American actor. He is best known for his roles in Jurassic World: Fallen Kingdom (2018), Pokémon: Detective Pikachu (2019), All the Bright Places (2020), Dungeons & Dragons: Honor Among Thieves (2023), I Saw the TV Glow (2024), Now You See Me: Now You Don't (2025) and Heated Rivalry (2027).

== Early life ==
Smith was born in Los Angeles, California, and grew up in Anaheim, California. He graduated from the Orange County School of the Arts in 2013 and performed in theatre around Orange County.

== Career ==
In 2014, Smith appeared in Nickelodeon's superhero comedy series The Thundermans, playing Angus in two episodes. He also appeared in the HBO documentary series Masterclass and some Vlogbrothers videos. In 2015, Smith had a supporting role as Marcus "Radar" Lincoln in Paper Towns.

In 2016, Smith had a lead role in Netflix's musical drama series The Get Down, playing Ezekiel Figuero, during which Smith employed method acting and took up residence in a dilapidated Bronx apartment. The Get Down premiered in August 2016 and concluded in April 2017.

In 2017, Smith was on the Forbes 30 Under 30 list. Smith also appeared opposite Lucas Hedges in the Off-Broadway stage production of Yen by playwright Anna Jordan. The production ran at the Lucille Lortel Theatre starting January 2017 and closed on March 4, 2017. In February 2018, Smith co-starred in Every Day as Justin. In June 2018, he portrayed Franklin Webb in Jurassic World: Fallen Kingdom.

In 2019, Smith starred in the film Detective Pikachu. He starred alongside Elle Fanning in All the Bright Places, for which filming commenced in the fall of 2018.

In 2020, Justice Smith participated in Acting for a Cause, a live play and screenplay reading series. Smith played Jack in The Importance of Being Earnest by Oscar Wilde and Dennis Ziegler in This Is Our Youth by Kenneth Lonergan. The reading raised funds for nonprofit organization including Mount Sinai Medical Center.

On August 7, 2026, it was announced that he had been cast as Harris Drover in the second season of Heated Rivalry.

== Personal life ==
Smith came out as queer in an Instagram post on June 5, 2020. He was in a relationship with actor Nicholas L. Ashe. They shot a Calvin Klein campaign ad together in mid-2022. In 2025, Smith said that he had no plans to date women ever again, though he clarified that he was still attracted to women as well as men. He explained that he found heterosexual relationships to be restrictive, as he felt the pressure to be "the man in the relationship", while he found same-sex relationships to be freeing.

Smith is an avid Pokémon fan.

== Filmography ==
=== Film ===
Year	Title	Role	Notes
2014	Trigger Finger	Boy at school	
2015	Paper Towns	Marcus "Radar" Lincoln	
2018	Every Day	Justin	
2018	Jurassic World: Fallen Kingdom	Franklin Webb	
2019	Pokémon: Detective Pikachu	Tim Goodman	
2020	All the Bright Places	Theodore "Theo" Finch	
2021	The Voyeurs	Thomas	
2021	Ron's Gone Wrong	Marc Wydell (voice)	
2022	Jurassic World Dominion	Franklin Webb	
2023	Sharper	Tom	
2023	Dungeons & Dragons: Honor Among Thieves	Simon Aumar	
2024	I Saw the TV Glow	Owen	
2024	The American Society of Magical Negroes	Aren	
2025	Now You See Me: Now You Don't	Charlie Vanderberg	
TBA	White Elephant †	TBA	Post-production
TBA	Trust the Man †	TBA	Post-production

=== Television ===
Year	Title	Role	Notes
2014	Masterclass	Himself	1 episode
2014–2015	The Thundermans	Angus	2 episodes
2016–2017	The Get Down	Ezekiel "Zeke" Figuero	Lead role; 11 episodes
2019	Drunk History	Ptolemy XIII	Episode: "Bad Blood"
2021	Generation	Chester	Main cast; 16 episodes
2027	Heated Rivalry †	Harris Drover	Season 2

=== Music videos ===
Year	Title	Artist(s)	Role	Ref.
2019	"Graduation"	Benny Blanco and Juice Wrld	Jackson	
2026	"Do Me Right"	Mr. Fantasy	Himself	

=== Theater ===
Year	Title	Role	Venue	Notes
2017	Yen	Bobbie	Lucille Lortel Theatre	Off-Broadway
2019	The Mother	Nicolas	Atlantic Theater Company	Off-Broadway
2025	Creditors	Adi	Minetta Lane Theatre	Off-Broadway

=== Video games ===
Year	Title	Role	Notes
2022	The Quarry	Ryan Erzahler	Voice, motion capture, and likeness

== Awards and nominations ==
Year	Award	Category	Nominated work	Result	Ref.
2017	Drama Desk Award	Outstanding Featured Actor in a Play	Yen	Nominated	
2017	Lucille Lortel Awards	Outstanding Featured Actor in a Play	Yen	Nominated	
2019	Golden Raspberry Awards	Worst Supporting Actor	Jurassic World: Fallen Kingdom	Nominated	
2021	Black Reel Awards	Outstanding Supporting Actor, Comedy Series	Generation	Nominated	
2021	Pena de Prata	Best Supporting Actor in a Comedy Series	Generation	Nominated	
2022	The Queerties	Favorite TV Performance	Generation	Nominated	
2023	New York Game Awards	Great White Way Award for Best Acting in a Game	The Quarry	Nominated	
2024	Variety & Golden Globe's Breakthrough Artist Awards	Breakthrough Award	I Saw the TV Glow / The American Society of Magical Negroes	Honoree	
2024	Astra Midseason Movie Awards	Best Actor	I Saw the TV Glow	Nominated	
2024	Gotham Awards	Outstanding Lead Performance	I Saw the TV Glow	Nominated	
2024	Film Independent Spirit Awards	Best Lead Performance	I Saw the TV Glow	Nominated	
2024	Indiana Film Journalists Association Awards	Best Lead Performance	I Saw the TV Glow	Nominated	
2025	Dorian Awards	Film Performance of the Year	I Saw the TV Glow	Nominated	
2025	The Queerties	Favorite Film Performance	I Saw the TV Glow	Pending	
