= We Were Liars =

2014 novel by E. Lockhart

- First edition
- Author: E. Lockhart
- Language: English
- Genre: Young adult fiction, psychological thriller
- Published: 2014
- Publisher: Delacorte Press
- Publication place: United States
- Media type: Print (hardcover, paperback)
- Pages: 256 pages
- ISBN: 978-0-38-574126-2
- OCLC: 1474532651
- Preceded by: Family of Liars

We Were Liars is a 2014 young-adult novel by E. Lockhart. The novel has received critical acclaim and won the Goodreads Choice Award for Best Young Adult Fiction. It was also listed as an ALA Top Ten Best Fiction for Young Adults for 2015.

We Were Liars focuses on the theme of the consequences of one's mistakes. It is centered on the wealthy, seemingly perfect Scots-American Sinclair family, who spend every summer sitting gathered on their private island. However, not every summer is the same — when something happens to Cadence during the summer of her fifteenth year, the other three "Liars" (Johnny, Mirren, and Gat) re-emerge two years later to prompt Cadence to remember the incident.

== Plot ==
Cadence Sinclair Eastman is the eldest grandchild of the wealthy family patriarch Harris Sinclair. Harris has three daughters (Cadence's mother, Penny, and her aunts Carrie and Bess) and owns an island near Martha's Vineyard called Beechwood Island, where the Sinclairs spend their summers. Cadence, her cousins Johnny and Mirren, and their best friend Gat Patil (the nephew of Carrie's partner Ed) are all of the same age and collectively known by the family as "The Liars." The summer Cadence is 14 (which she refers to as Summer 14), Gat and Cadence fall in love and begin a relationship.

During Summer 15, Cadence suffers a serious head injury, only recalling that she struck her head in the water. She loses most of her memories of that summer, but she knows bits and pieces of it. She also starts to overthink and begins to have migraines. She subsequently becomes addicted to Percocet and is forced to repeat a year at school. Whenever she tries to reach out to Johnny and Mirren, she is ignored. Rather than allowing her to go to the island for Summer 16, Penny forces Cadence to go on a tour of Europe with her father (who Cadence is no longer close to after he had an affair and abandoned the family).

Cadence is allowed to go back to Beechwood for Summer 17 and is surprised to see that her once controlling grandfather now has dementia and his beautiful colonial mansion, Clairmont, has been replaced by New Clairmont — a cold, modern architectural monstrosity that has none of the charms of the previous Clairmont. The other Liars act strangely around Cadence and refuse to talk about what happened in Summer 15, saying that Penny has advised that Cadence needs to figure it out by herself. They reject the idea of spending time at New Clairmont and instead camp out at Cuddledown. Cadence and Gat slowly rekindle their previous relationship.

Cadence begins to recall events from Summer 15. She recalls that after her grandmother Tipper had died between Summers 14 and 15, her mother and aunts began to bicker over their inheritances. They all tried to use their children to gain Harris's favor; however, none of the sisters had been able to earn a living independently despite a top education and access to a trust fund, which annoyed him and threatened their inheritances. Carrie had also rejected a marriage proposal from Ed despite living together for almost nine years, because Harris was opposed to her marrying a man of Indian descent and she was worried she'd be cut off from the family. Gat was angry because this meant that Summer 15 would be his last summer on the island: if Carrie stayed with Ed she'd be cut off from the family, and if she left Ed then Gat would no longer be related to the family.

Cadence eventually recalls that in an attempt to stop the disputes, she convinced the rest of the Liars to burn down Clairmont to get the family to stop feuding, because the Liars saw Clairmont as the symbol of everything wrong with their family. This is why New Clairmont was built. She is delighted with the idea that she kept the family together until she recalls that the Liars forgot to release her grandfather's dogs, killing them in the fire. When she goes to Gat for comfort, he reluctantly asks if that was the only thing she remembered.

Cadence later realizes that her act of arson killed Johnny, Mirren and Gat too because she had prematurely set fire to the ground floor, trapping Johnny and Mirren on higher floors and Gat in the basement, which prevented their escape as the house burned down. She goes to visit the Liars at Cuddledown where they tell her that their deaths were not her fault (as they share responsibility for the criminal conspiracy to destroy her grandfather’s mansion) and reveal that they will no longer be able to appear to her, with Gat giving her a final kiss and the three of them diving into the ocean and disappearing.

It is revealed that Carrie and Ed are still together and Cadence endeavours to live her life and endure.

== Characters ==
=== The Liars ===
- Cadence “Cady” Sinclair Eastman – the only daughter of Penny Sinclair and the eldest Sinclair grandchild; also the narrator.
- Gatwick “Gat” Matthew Patil – the nephew of Carrie's partner, Ed, who started coming to spend summers in Beechwood during Summer 8. He is of Indian origins.
- Jonathan “Johnny” Sinclair Dennis – Carrie's eldest child, born three weeks after Cadence, second eldest Sinclair grandchild. A partygoer and playboy, and also a skilled tennis player.
- Mirren Sinclair Sheffield – Bess' eldest daughter, third eldest Sinclair grandchild.

=== The Sinclairs ===
- Harris Sinclair – The wealthy patriarch of the family, a controlling tycoon who enjoys watching his children fight to please him.
- Tipper Sinclair – Matriarch of the family, married to Harris.
- Penny Sinclair Eastman – Cadence's mother and the middle Sinclair daughter.
- Carrie Sinclair Dennis – Mother to Jonathan and Will, eldest Sinclair daughter.
- Bess Sinclair Sheffield – Mother to Mirren, Liberty, Bonnie, and Taft, the youngest Sinclair daughter.
- Will Sinclair Dennis – Cadence's youngest cousin, son of Carrie.
- Bonnie Sinclair Sheffield – Twin to Liberty, daughter of Bess.
- Liberty Sinclair Sheffield – Twin to Bonnie, daughter of Bess.
- Taft Sinclair Sheffield – Son of Bess.

== Pre-publication ==
E. Lockhart wrote We Were Liars with knowledge of the ending. She was particularly inspired by the twist endings in Gillian Flynn's Gone Girl, because the first twist still kept the reader interested, as well as Rebecca Stead's When You Reach Me which contained a lot of small details that fell into place at the end. The novel is written in five acts, though pieces of each were rearranged, particularly the middle three. Lockhart wrote the novel on the writing software Scrivener which made it easy to rearrange segments of text. She changed the structure of the ending shortly before the advance reader copy, based on suggestions from young adult author John Green.

As a child, Lockhart was "captivated" by fairy tale collections her mother had and incorporated a fairy tale feel to We Were Liars; she stated, "Fairy tales have been a preoccupation of mine for a very long time, and for a long time I wanted to write a contemporary story with a fairy-tale structure so I could unpack some of what I had spent so much time thinking about." The relationship between the Liars was inspired by Lockhart's "fantasy" of having close friends growing up, but also an attempt to "unpack" potential consequences of the bond. The character of Gat, who is part of the Liars but also an outsider to the family, was drawn from Lockhart's experience as a scholarship student at private schools, as well as Emily Brontë's novel Wuthering Heights. Lockhart also stated that some individuals close to her experience migraines and she was interested in exploring how pain affects one's personality and perception of the world.

The publisher hoped that the novel would have a large crossover appeal to adult readers because it had "Teens who must interact with imperfect adults and imperfect adults who are important to the entire dynamic of the plot." To promote We Were Liars without giving too much of the plot away, a blog on Tumblr was created, focusing on the aesthetic of the Sinclair's island with quotes from the book. The promotional material urged readers to "just lie" if they were asked about the ending.

== Themes ==
Los Angeles Times writer Amy Benfer described that thematically, We Were Liars was "a classic story of decaying aristocracy and the way that privilege can often hamstring more than help."

== Release and reception ==
We Were Liars debuted at #6 on the New York Times Bestseller List in the young adult category. From June 1 to September 7, it spent 13 weeks on the top ten. Goodreads determined that it was the most-searched standalone title of 2014 on the website, leading them to declare it a possibility for the year's "it" book. Bustle affirmed this declaration, believing that the novel was "compulsively readable," had a "meaningful" plot, and was frequently talked about.

We Were Liars received mostly positive reviews from critics. Kirkus Reviews awarded We Were Liars a starred review, stating that it was "riveting, brutal and beautifully told." The review particularly praised Lockhart's humanizing of the Sinclairs. Publishers Weekly also wrote a starred review, referring to Lockhart's depiction of the family as "astute." School Library Journal reviewer Karyn Silverman said that Cadence's voice was the highlight of the novel, but also praised the "smart" writing in regards to plotting and complex characters. Katrina Hedeen of The Horn Book Magazine also gave a starred review, describing it as an "intriguing, atmospheric story" with a "taut psychological mystery" and unexpected twist. The Wall Street Journal also gave a positive review, noting the crossover appeal to adults and praising Cadence as an unreliable narrator.

Josh Lacey of The Guardian described the novel as "cunning" and "clever", calling the twist ending "nastier and more shocking than anything I had imagined." The Daily Telegraph's Martin Chilton gave the book four out of five stars, calling it "a mysterious and addictive treat" with a twist that is "dramatic and severe." Meg Rosoff, writing for The New York Times, felt that the execution "fell oddly flat"; she enjoyed the "snappy characterizations" of the privileged family, but felt that overall the novel was not able to fully delve into the personalities of the characters. In regards to the ending, however, she wrote that "Lockhart just about manages to pull it off, thanks to the freshness of the writing and the razor-sharp metaphor amnesia provides for the Sinclair family habit of denial."

Author R.L. Stine praised the twist in the novel as being "the most heartbreaking twist" he had ever encountered.

We Were Liars was listed among the best young adult books of 2014 by Kirkus Reviews, Publishers Weekly, School Library Journal, and The Wall Street Journal. It was also the only young adult novel listed in Amazon's Best 20 Books of the Year.

Awards for We Were Liars
Year	Award	Result	Ref.
2014	Goodreads Choice Award for Young Adult Fiction	Winner	
2015	ALA Best Fiction for Young Adults	Top 10	
2015	Teen Choice Book Awards' Book of the Year	Finalist	

== Television adaptation ==
In July 2022, Lockhart announced that We Were Liars, as well as the prequel, Family of Liars, would be adapted into a television show. The screen rights were acquired by Julie Plec's My So-Called Company and Universal Television. Plec adapted the books for television and called the opportunity a "career highlight". In March 2023, the series was greenlit by Amazon Studios. The series premiered on June 18, 2025, with the full eight episodes.
