= Cinco Puntos Press =

American publishing company

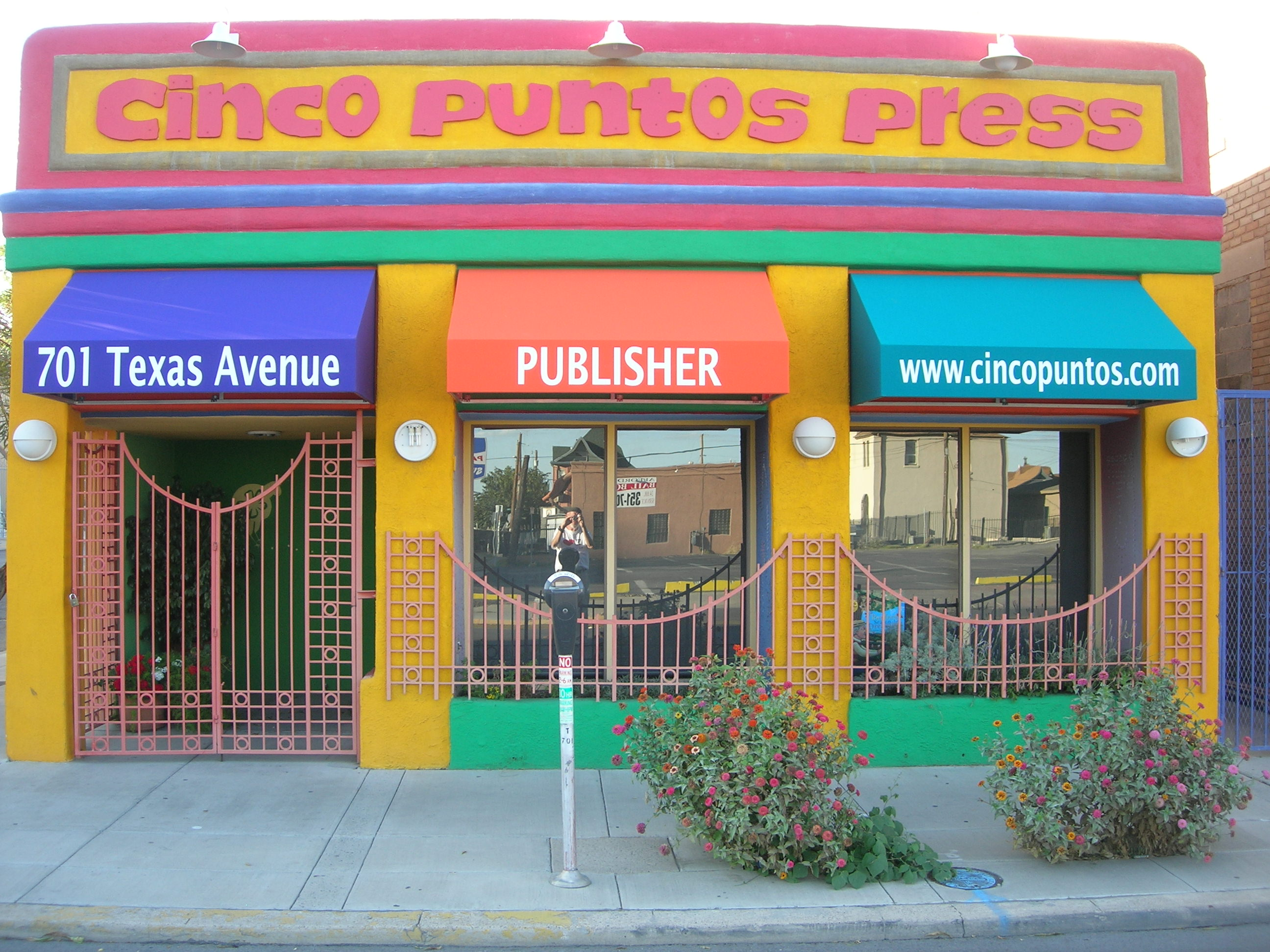
- Parent company: Lee & Low Books
- Founded: 1985
- Founder: Bobby Byrd and Lee Byrd
- Country of origin: United States
- Headquarters location: El Paso, Texas
- Distribution: Consortium Book Sales & Distribution
- Publication types: Books
- Official website: www.cincopuntos.com

Cinco Puntos Press is an imprint of publishing company Lee & Low Books. It was founded in 1985 and began publishing bilingual books for both children and adults, prominently including books about the Mexico–United States border region. The publisher was subject to controversy in 1999 when it published The Story of Colors by Subcomandante Marcos. It was sold to Lee & Low Books in 2021.

== History ==
Cinco Puntos Press was founded by novelist Lee Merrill Byrd and poet Bobby Byrd in 1985. It became known for publishing books with a multi-cultural and political focus for both children and adults, with a focus on bilingual children's books and fiction and non-fiction about the Mexico–United States border region.

Cinco Puntos received national notoriety when, in March 1999, it published the book The Story of Colors / La Historia de los colores written by Subcomandante Marcos, the leader of the Zapatista Army of National Liberation in Mexico, causing the National Endowment for the Arts to pull funding for the publisher. The Lannan Foundation provided Cinco Puntos Press with twice the amount of the lost funding, and Cinco Puntos Press sold out their first printing of the book in days.

Cinco Puntos Press was sold to Lee & Low Books in June 2021.

== Notable authors ==
Cinco Puntos Press authors include Joe Hayes, Benjamin Alire Sáenz, Sergio Troncoso, Tim Tingle, George Ella Lyon, Dagoberto Gilb, David Romo, Lisa Sandlin, Robert Boswell, Gary Cartwright, Xavier Garza, James Carlos Blake, Subcomandante Marcos, Byrd Baylor, J.L. Powers, Youme Landowne, Paco Ignacio Taibo II.

== Significant awards ==
The company has won several awards:

- Lannan Foundation, 2005—Publisher Bobby Byrd and Lee Merrill Byrd awarded Cultural Freedom Fellowships for Excellence in Publishing
- Before Columbus Foundation, The American Book Award, 1999, for Excellence in Publishing
- Rocky Mountain Publishing Association—the Dwight A. Myers Award, 1997, for Excellence in Regional Publishing
- Border Regional Library Association—the Southwest Book Award, 1993, for Excellence in Publishing

In addition, author Benjamin Alire Sáenz won a PEN/Faulkner Award for Fiction and a Lambda Literary Award in 2013 for his book Everything Begins and Ends at the Kentucky Club, published by Cinco Puntos in 2012.
