= Texas Library Association =

- Formation: 1902
- Type: Non-profit NGO
- Headquarters: Austin, Texas
- Region served: United States
- President: Valerie Prilop (2025-2026)
- Website: www.txla.org

The Texas Library Association (TLA) is a charitable non-profit group that promotes libraries in Texas. It was founded on June 9, 1902. TLA is affiliated with the American Library Association (ALA) and has more than 6,000 members made up of librarians and library workers from academic, public, school and special libraries. Membership also includes library advocates, educators, and vendors. The organization has established annual awards and scholarships that honor excellence in the library profession. It also curates reading lists each year for multiple age groups, ranging from fiction, nonfiction, graphic novels, picture books, to bilingual and multicultural books.

Headquartered in Austin, Texas, the association is governed by a Council that meets at the TLA Annual Conference and the Officer Governance Training and Workshop (formerly known as Annual Assembly). The executive board serves as the central management board and recommends matters of policy, budget, and operations to the council. Board members are elected annually by the membership. TLA sponsors an annual conference that accounts for 80% of its annual revenue.

== Freedom to Read ==
In the fall of 2021, TLA released a statement, "The Freedom to Read is a Right and Must Be Protected," to make it clear that TLA opposes efforts that restrict the freedom to read through banning, removing, or other forms of restricting access to books or other materials. The controversy erupted after State Rep. Matt Krause, a Fort Worth Republican running for Texas attorney general, sent a letter to certain school districts with an 850-book list that included novels about racism and sexuality, asking the districts whether they had those books, how many copies they had and how much money was spent on them. Governor Greg Abbott joined the fray, saying "A growing number of parents of Texas students are becoming increasingly alarmed about some of the books and other content found in public school libraries that are extremely inappropriate in the public education system.”

Texas Public Radio's "The Source," a live call-in program, featured TLA member Sara Stevenson and author Ashley Hope Pérez discussing the GOP-fueled fight over kid-appropriate library books.

TLA President-Elect Mary Woodard spoke to the Dallas Morning News. Librarians could search for topics flagged by the legislator — such as human sexuality and sexually transmitted diseases — through subject headings in the Library of Congress Classification system used by most districts, Woodard said.

But determining which items might cause students distress because of their race or sex is an entirely subjective request, she said.

“What causes discomfort to one person may not cause discomfort to another person,” Woodard said. “That’s going to be very difficult to provide. And I feel like in most districts, their attorneys will probably say, ‘We cannot provide this information for you.’”

Several TLA members also launched the social media movement #FReadom, to celebrate diverse books and authors.

“One of the chilling effects is people get scared, and you get siloed. You're afraid, you're alone,” says Carolyn Foote, a library consultant who spent 29 years as a school librarian. “We hope people realize they’re not alone—there are people and librarians fighting for students to have rights to literature and information.”

== Awards ==
The Texas Library Association bestows a variety of awards, scholarships, and stipends to honor excellence in, and contributions to, the library profession. The TLA Distinguished Service Award is an annual award given to a librarian who as demonstrated outstanding leadership and service. The first recipient of this award was Edwin Sue Goree.

The Texas Bluebonnet Award is given annually to a book written for children in grades 3-6. The winning book is chosen by Texas students, who vote for their favorite title out of a list of twenty books. The author of the winning title is presented with the award at the Texas Library Association Annual Conference in the spring.

== See also ==
- List of libraries in the United States
