= Edgar Allan Poe Award for Best Juvenile =

The Edgar Allan Poe Award for Best Juvenile Mystery Fiction is a category presented 1961 onwards at the Edgar Awards (commonly known as the Edgars), named after Edgar Allan Poe. The awards are presented every year by the Mystery Writers of America and they remain the most prestigious awards in the mystery genre.

== Winners ==
=== 1960s ===
Year	Author	Title	Result	Ref.
1961	Phyllis A. Whitney	The Mystery of the Haunted Pool	Winner	
1962	Edward Fenton	The Phantom of Walkaway Hill	Winner	
1963	Scott Corbett	Cutlass Island	Winner	
1964	Phyllis A. Whitney	Mystery of the Hidden Hand	Winner	
1965	Marcella Thum	Mystery at Crane's Landing	Winner	
1966	Leon Ware	The Mystery of 22 East	Winner	
1967	Kin Platt	Sinbad and Me	Winner	
1968	Gretchen Sprague	Signpost to Terror	Winner	
1969	Virginia Hamilton	The House of Dies Drear	Winner	

=== 1970s ===
Year	Author	Title	Result	Ref.
1970	Winifred Finlay	Danger at Black Dyke	Winner	
1971	John Rowe Townsend	The Intruder	Winner	
1972	Joan Aiken	Night Fall	Winner	
1973	Robb White	Deathwatch	Winner	
1974	Jay Bennett	The Long Black Coat	Winner	
1975	Jay Bennett	The Dangling Witness	Winner	
1976	Robert C. O'Brien	Z for Zachariah	Winner	
1977	Richard Peck	Are You in the House Alone?	Winner	
1978	Eloise Jarvis McGraw	A Really Weird Summer	Winner	
1979	Dana Brookins	Alone in Wolf Hollow	Winner	

=== 1980s ===
Year	Author	Title	Result	Ref.
1980	Joan Lowery Nixon	The Kidnapping of Christina Lattimore	Winner	
1981	Joan Lowery Nixon	The Seance	Winner	
1982	Norma Fox Mazer	Taking Terri Mueller	Winner	
1983	Robbie Branscum	The Murder of Hound Dog Bates	Winner	
1984	Cynthia Voigt	The Callender Papers	Winner	
1985	Phyllis Reynolds Naylor	Night Cry	Winner	
1986	Patricia Windsor	The Sandman's Eyes	Winner	
1987	Joan Lowery Nixon	The Other Side of Dark	Winner	
1988	Susan Shreve	Lucy Forever and Miss Rosetree, Shrinks	Winner	
1989	Willo Davis Roberts	Megan's Island	Winner	

=== 1990s ===
Year	Author	Title	Result	Ref.
1991	Pam Conrad	Stonewords	Winner	
1992	Betsy Byars	Wanted...Mud Blossom	Winner	
1993	Eve Bunting	Coffin on a Case!	Winner	
1994	Barbara Brooks Wallace	The Twin in the Tavern	Winner	
1995	Willo Davis Roberts	The Absolutely True Story... How I Visited Yellowstone Park with the Terrible Rubes	Winner	
1996	Nancy Springer	Looking for Jamie Bridger	Winner	
1997	Dorothy Reynolds Miller	The Clearing	Winner	
1998	Barbara Brooks Wallace	Sparrows in the Scullery	Winner	
1999	Wendelin Van Draanen	Sammy Keyes and the Hotel Thief	Winner	

=== 2000s ===
Year	Author	Title	Result	Ref.
2000	Elizabeth McDavid Jones	The Night Flyers	Winner	
2001	Frances O'Roark Dowell	Dovey Coe	Winner	
2002	Lillian Eige	Dangling	Winner	
2003	Helen Ericson	Harriet Spies Again	Winner	
2004	Phyllis Reynolds Naylor	Bernie Magruder & the Bats in the Belfry	Winner	
2005	Blue Balliett	Chasing Vermeer	Winner	
2006	D. James Smith	The Boys of San Joaquin	Winner	
2007	Andrew Clements	Room One: a Mystery or Two	Winner	
2008	Katherine Marsh	The Night Tourist	Winner	
2009	Tony Abbott	The Postcard	Winner	

=== 2010s ===
2010s Best Juvenile winners
Year	Author	Title	Result	Ref.
2010	Mary Downing Hahn	Closed for the Season	Winner	
2011	Dori Hillestad Butler	The Buddy Files: The Case of the Lost Boy	Winner	
2012	Matthew J. Kirby	Icefall	Winner	
2012	Tom Angleberger	Horton Halfpott	Shortlist	
2012	Mac Barnett	It Happened on a Train	Shortlist	
2012	Sheela Chari	Vanished	Shortlist	
2012	Shawn Thomas Odyssey	The Wizard of Dark Street	Shortlist	
2013	Jack D. Ferraiolo	The Quick Fix	Winner	
2014	Amy Timberlake	One Came Home	Winner	
2014	Josh Berk	Strike Three, You’re Dead	Shortlist	
2014	Erin Dionne	Moxie and the Art of Rule Breaking	Shortlist	
2014	Caroline Lawrence	P. K. Pinkerton and the Petrified Man	Shortlist	
2014	Jonathan Stroud	The Screaming Staircase	Shortlist	
2015	Kate Milford	Greenglass House	Winner	
2015	Heather Vogel Frederick	Absolutely Truly	Shortlist	
2015	Stuart Gibbs	Space Case	Shortlist	
2015	“Science Bob” Pflugfelder and Steve Hockensmith	Nick and Tesla’s Super-Cyborg Gadget Glove	Shortlist	
2015	N. H. Senzai	Saving Kabul Corner	Shortlist	
2015	Marcia Wells	Eddie Red, Undercover: Mystery on Museum Mile	Shortlist	
2016	Susan Vaught	Footer Davis Probably Is Crazy	Winner	
2016	Avi	Catch You Later, Traitor	Shortlist	
2016	Matthew Baker	If You Find This	Shortlist	
2016	Lauren Oliver and H. C. Chester	Curiosity House: The Shrunken Head	Shortlist	
2016	Kevin Sands	The Blackthorn Key	Shortlist	
2017	Wesley King	OCDaniel	Winner	
2017	Ally Condie	Summerlost	Shortlist	
2017	Sarah Lariviere	The Bad Kid	Shortlist	
2017	Claire Legrand	Some Kind of Happiness	Shortlist	
2017	James Ponti	Framed!	Shortlist	
2017	Susan Vaught	Things Too Huge to Fix by Saying Sorry	Shortlist	
2018	James Ponti	Vanished!	Winner	
2018	Kirby Larson	Audacity Jones Steals the Show	Shortlist	
2018	Kevin Sands	The Assassin’s Curse	Shortlist	
2018	Robin Stevens	First Class Murder	Shortlist	
2018	Ru Xu	NewsPrints	Shortlist	
2019	Pete Hautman	Otherwood	Winner	
2019	Tony Abbott	Denis Ever After	Shortlist	
2019	Martha Freeman	Zap!	Shortlist	
2019	A.B. Greenfield	Ra the Mighty: Cat Detective	Shortlist	
2019	Ben Guterson	Winterhouse	Shortlist	
2019	Karen Kane	Charlie & Frog	Shortlist	
2019	T.R. Simon	Zora & Me: The Cursed Ground	Shortlist	

=== 2020s ===
2020s Best Juvenile winners
Year	Author	Title	Result	Ref.
2020	Susan Vaught	Me and Sam-Sam Handle the Apocalypse	Winner	
2020	Cary Fagan	The Collected Works of Gretchen Oyster	Shortlist	
2020	Corey Ann Haydu	Eventown	Shortlist	
2020	Greg Howard	The Whispers	Shortlist	
2020	Laura Tucker	All the Greys on Greene Street	Shortlist	
2021	Elizabeth C. Bunce	Premeditated Myrtle	Winner	
2021	Tanya Lloyd Kyi	Me and Banksy	Shortlist	
2021	Janae Marks	From the Desk of Zoe Washington	Shortlist	
2021	Nnedi Okorafor	Ikenga	Shortlist	
2021	Melissa Savage	Nessie Quest	Shortlist	
2021	Taryn Souders	Coop Knows the Scoop	Shortlist	
2022	Christina Diaz Gonzalez	Concealed	Winner	
2022	Elizabeth C. Bunce	Cold-Blooded Myrtle	Shortlist	
2022	Marthe Jocelyn	Aggie Morton Mystery Queen: The Dead Man in the Garden	Shortlist	
2022	M. G. Leonard and Sam Sedgman	Kidnap on the California Comet: Adventures on Trains #2	Shortlist	
2022	Jennifer A. Nielsen	Rescue	Shortlist	
2023	Marthe Jocelyn	Aggie Morton Mystery Queen: The Seaside Corpse	Winner	
2023	Michael D. Beil	The Swallowtail Legacy: Wreck at Ada’s Reef	Shortlist	
2023	Julie Buxbaum	The Area 51 Files	Shortlist	
2023	M. G. Leonard and Sam Sedgman	Adventures on Trains: Murder on the Safari Star	Shortlist	
2023	Kekla Magoon	Chester Keene Cracks the Code	Shortlist	
2024	Adrianna Cuevas	The Ghosts of Rancho Espanto	Winner	
2024	Elizabeth C. Bunce	Myrtle, Means, and Opportunity	Shortlist	
2024	Lamar Giles	Epic Ellisons: Cosmos Camp	Shortlist	
2024	Larry Schwarz and Iva Marie Palmer	The Jules Verne Prophecy	Shortlist	
2024	Claire Swinarski	What Happened to Rachel Riley?	Shortlist	
2025	Margaret Peterson Haddix	Mysteries of Trash and Treasure: The Stolen Key	Winner	
2025	P. G. Bell	The Beanstalk Murder	Shortlist	
2025	Janet Fox	Mystery of Mystic Mountain	Shortlist	
2025	Aimee Lim	The Spindle of Fate	Shortlist	
2025	Ginger Reno	Find Her	Shortlist	
2026	Tiffany D. Jackson	Blood in the Water	Winner	
2026	Alasdair Beckett-King	Montgomery Bonbon: Murder at the Museum	Shortlist	
2026	Erin Soderberg Downing	What Happened Then	Shortlist	
2026	Debbi Michiko Florence	A Study in Secrets	Shortlist	
2026	Judith Rossell	The Midwatch Institute for Wayward Girls	Shortlist	
2026	Ally Russell	Mystery James Digs Her Own Grave	Shortlist	
