= The Cuckoo Tree =

1971 children's novel by Joan Aiken

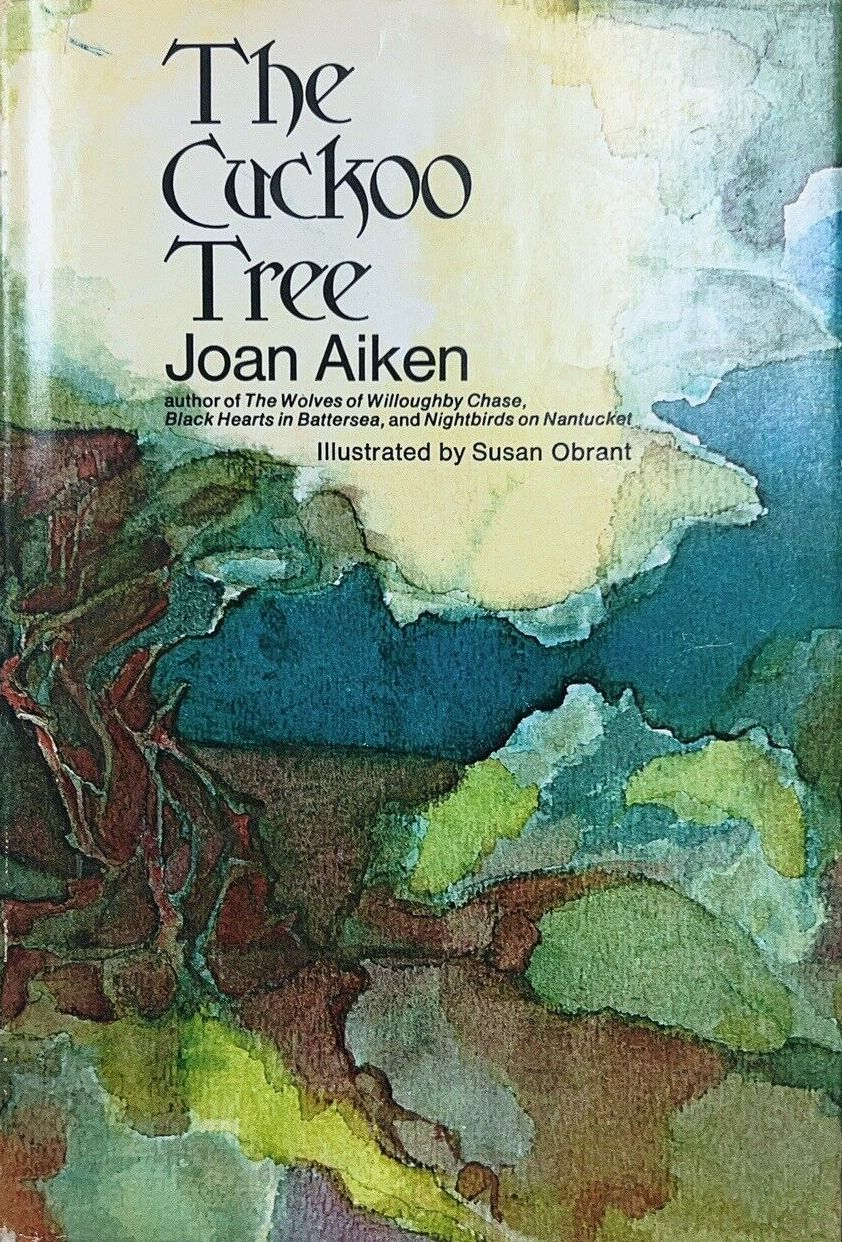
- First edition cover
- Author: Joan Aiken
- Illustrator: Susan Obrant, Pat Marriott (UK)
- Language: English
- Genre: Alternate history, children's novel
- Publisher: Doubleday & Company, Inc.
- Publication date: 1971
- Publication place: United Kingdom
- Media type: Print (hardback & paperback)
- Pages: 272
- ISBN: 0-224-01924-4
- Preceded by: The Stolen Lake
- Followed by: Dido and Pa

The Cuckoo Tree is a children's novel by Joan Aiken, first published in 1971. Taking place in an alternate history, the story presents the further adventures of Dido Twite, a teenage Victorian tomboy, in southern England. The novel is chronologically the fifth of the Wolves Chronicles, a series of books set in a fictional 19th century in which the Stuart kings had not been ousted by William of Orange; a key plot driver (from Black Hearts in Battersea) is the efforts of "Hanoverians" to overthrow "King James III" and his heirs.

The Cuckoo Tree was published before its prequel, The Stolen Lake. The Cuckoo Tree is also a sequel to The Whispering Mountain, with Captain Hughes of HMS Thrush, (the ship is also mentioned in the Felix series) eventually reunited with his son, Owen, the hero of the previous book, who takes part in the coronation, but is otherwise only briefly mentioned in The Cuckoo Tree.

== Plot ==
Captain Hughes and Dido Twite are travelling by stagecoach from the port of Chichester with important dispatches for the Admiralty in London when the carriage is upset and Captain Hughes is injured. While looking for help, Dido encounters a group of men who direct her to Teaglaze Manor; the men turn out to be smugglers who use the local canal system to transport their wares to London.

At Teagleaze Manor, Dido encounters several characters including Lady Tegleaze, who sends her servants and personal physician to the aid of Captain Hughes. Hughes is settled in an abandoned tenant cottage to recover, under the care of a local nurse, the unpleasant Mrs. Lubbage.

Unwilling to trust the local postman and needing to get the dispatches to London, Dido goes to "the Cuckoo Tree," a local landmark used as a rendezvous by the smugglers. There she encounters Cris, a mysterious child who proves to be a key element in a plot to swindle Lady Tegleaze out of her property. However there is another plot afoot; Lady Tegleaze's lawyer, Mr. Fitzpickwick, is in league with a Hanoverian agent planning to kill the young king at his coronation.

With the aid of Cris and the Wineberry smugglers, Dido must rescue Lady Tegleaze' grandson Sir Tobit and race the Hanoverian plotters to St. Paul's Cathedral, where her old friend Simon is now Master of the King's Garlandries.

== Characters ==
- Dido Twite, a teenage cockney; the protagonist of the novel
- Captain Hughes, of HMS Thrush, the ship which picked up Dido in Nantucket
- Lady Tegleaze, owner of Teagleaze Manor and its declining estates
- Gusset, butler to Lady Tegleaze
- Sir Tobit, the grandson of Lady Tegleaze
- Daisy Lubbage, a famous nurse and herbalist
- Cris, an orphan under the care of Mrs. Lubbage
- Yan Wineberry, a smuggler and the son of Mr. Gusset
- Desmond Twite, aka Pa, Dido's father and an activist of the Hanoverian cause
- King Richard IV, son and heir of James III
