= Robin Jacques =

English illustrator (1920–1995)

- Born: Robin Jaques; 27 March 1920; Chelsea, London, England
- Died: 18 March 1995 (aged 74)
- Occupation: Illustrator
- Spouses: Patricia Bamford; Azetta van der Merwe; Alexandra Mann
- Children: 1 son (with Bamford)
- Relatives: Hattie Jacques (sister); Robert Bamford (father-in-law); Matilda Etches (mother-in-law)

Robin Jacques /ˈdʒeɪks/ (27 March 1920 – 18 March 1995) was a British illustrator whose work was published in more than 100 novels and children's books. He is notable for his long collaboration with Ruth Manning-Sanders, illustrating many of her collections of fairy tales from all over the world. In much of his work, Jacques employed the stippling technique.

He was quoted as saying: "My preference is for children's books of the more imaginative and fanciful kind, since these leave greater scope for illustrative invention, where I feel most at home. Thus, my work with Ruth Manning-Sanders has proved most satisfying, and the twenty-five books we have done together contain much of the work that I feel personally happiest with."

== Biography ==
Jacques (born Jaques) was the son of World War One pilot Robin Jaques and his wife, Mary. His father was born in 1896, and joined the Middlesex Regiment in 1916, being later commissioned in the Royal Scots Fusiliers. His father was from Newcastle, and attended Rutherford College, and joined the Royal Army Education Corps. When in 100 Sqn, his father hit a field east of Cold Harbour towards Old Somerby at 11.30am on 8 August, in an Avro 504; he had been at Grantham since 2 April 1923. and lived near Folkingham.

His sister Hattie Jacques became a well-known actress. When his sister added a 'c' to her surname, he did as well. Jacques taught himself to be an artist and began working in an advertising agency in his teens. Although he had no formal art training, he enjoyed drawing and used anatomy books, items in the Victoria and Albert Museum, and objects in his surroundings for his instruction.

Jacques was art editor for Strand magazine and art director for the Central Office of Information. He began teaching at Harrow College of Art in 1973 and at Canterbury Art College and Wimbledon Art College in 1975.

Jacques was prolific: he illustrated over 100 novels and children's books from the 1940s to the 1980s, most notably the fairy-tale compilations of Ruth Manning-Sanders – mainly the 22-volume "A Book of ..." series from Methuen Publishing (E.P. Dutton in the United States), 1962 to 1984. He provided illustrations for Lilliput and Radio Times.

His work is notable for its detail, its expressive characters and the virtuosic use of stippling.

"Illustration is something other than superlative drawing or a display of technical know-how. Unlike painting and sculpture, an illustration has a direct function... Illustration can never be a private exercise in graphic experiment unrelated to a specific purpose. Where it becomes this, it may be in itself enormously interesting but it will, by definition, no longer be illustration."

== Personal life ==
In 1943, Jacques married Patricia Bamford, daughter of engineer Robert Bamford, co-founder of Aston Martin, and fashion designer Matilda Etches, and they had one son, John Paul Jacques.

After her death he married Azetta van der Merwe in 1958, and after her death on 7 October 1968, he married Alexandra Mann (died in Nantes, France on Feb. 2021) on Saturday April 10 1971 in Brighton, which ended in divorce. Alexandra's father, Colin Mann, lived in Belgravia on Chester Row, and was the chairman of the Institute of Public Relations, and her mother, Liza Mann, lived in Maussane-les-Alpilles. At the time he lived in Bormes-les-Mimosas, in south-east France.

John Paul Jacques was married on Saturday 9 September 1989 at the catholic Church of St Margaret of Scotland, Twickenham to Sally Jane Haselhurst, the daughter of Major Michael Haselhurst, being married by Father Hilary Crewe. John had known Sally for many years, as both attended the memorial service to Hattie Jacques in November 1980, and the memorial service to John le Mesurier in February 1984.

== Selected books illustrated ==
- John Keir Cross, The Angry Planet (London: Peter Lunn, 1945)
- John Keir Cross, The Owl and the Pussycat: a strange story for children (London: Peter Lunn, 1946)
- John Keir Cross, The Man in Moonlight: the Tale of a Twice Lost Cause (London: John Westhouse, 1947)
- C. S. Forester, The General (Penguin, 1956) 'The illustration on the cover has been specially drawn for this edition by Robin Jacques'.
- Janet Frame, Mona Minim and the Smell of the Sun (New York: Braziller, 1969)
- James Joyce, A Portrait of the Artist as a Young Man (London: Jonathan Cape, 1954)
- James Joyce, Dubliners (London: Jonathan Cape, 1954)
- Ruth Manning-Sanders, A Book of Giants (London, Methuen & Co. 1962; New York: E. P. Dutto, 1963)
- Ruth Manning-Sanders, "A Book of ..." (London: Methuen & Co., 1962 to 1984, 22 volumes)
- Joan Aiken, Black Hearts in Battersea (Doubleday, 1964) and Nightbirds on Nantucket (Jonathan Cape, 1966)
