= Nightbirds on Nantucket =

1966 children's book by Joan Aiken

- Author: Joan Aiken
- Illustrator: Robin Jacques, Pat Marriott (UK editions)
- Language: English
- Genre: Alternate history, children's novel
- Publisher: Jonathan Cape
- Publication date: 1966
- Publication place: United Kingdom
- Media type: Print (hardback & paperback)
- Pages: 272
- ISBN: 0-224-01924-4
- Preceded by: Black Hearts in Battersea
- Followed by: The Stolen Lake

Nightbirds on Nantucket is a children's novel by Joan Aiken, first published in 1966. Taking place in an alternate history, the story presents the further adventures of Dido Twite, an eleven-year-old Victorian tomboy, aboard a whaling ship and in Nantucket.

The novel is the third in the Wolves Chronicles, a series of books set in a fictional 19th century in which the Stuart kings were never ousted by William of Orange; a key plot driver (from Black Hearts in Battersea) is the efforts of "Hanoverians" to overthrow "King James III" and his heirs. Nightbirds on Nantucket is the second novel to feature Dido Twite and the first in which she is the main character.

The UK editions and their covers were initially illustrated by Pat Marriott, whose moody pen and ink drawings were used for most of the Wolves Chronicles, and several other Aiken books.

== Plot ==
Dido Twite awakens aboard the whaling ship The Sarah Casket, where she has been cared for in a coma by Nate Pardon, a young sailor who found her adrift in the Atlantic Ocean after the adventures of Black Hearts in Battersea. Dido is induced by the ship's captain to look after his daughter, Dutiful Penitence Casket, a neurotic eight-year-old who is travelling aboard the whaler. After drawing the girl out of her shell, Dido agrees to stay briefly on Nantucket to help "Pen's" transition to life with her Aunt Tribulation, who is to look after Pen while her father pursues his obsession, a mysterious pink whale. Dido is discomfited to find that Aunt Tribulation is apparently a demanding invalid, and Dido's plan to leave and take ship to London are further delayed when Nate brings Captain Casket to the house; when approaching the pink whale in a longboat, "Rosie Lee" sank it, and the injured captain is only semi-conscious.

While exploring the surrounding countryside, Dido encounters a mysterious but comic foreigner, who proves to be sighting a gigantic cannon intended to assassinate King James III by blowing up the royal palace; Mr. Slighcarp, the Sarah Casket's first mate, is part of the plot together with his sister Letitia, the villainess of The Wolves of Willoughby Chase. Disbelieved by the other adults, Dido and Pen, with the help of Nate, attempt to disable the cannon, whose recoil would send the island of Nantucket crashing into New York City.

== Characters ==
- Dido Twite, the protagonist of the novel
- Jabez Casket, the captain of The Sarah Casket
- Dutiful Penitence Casket, daughter of Captain Casket
- Tribulation Turvey, the sister of Captain Casket and Pen's aunt
- Miss Letitia Slighcarp, formerly the governess of Bonnie and Sylvia Green in The Wolves of Willoughby Chase; an activist of the Hanoverian cause
- Mr. Slighcarp, first mate of The Sarah Casket and Letitia Slighcarp's brother
- Nathaniel Pardon, a seaman of The Sarah Casket, rescuer of Dido
- Doktor Axeltree Breadno, a European gunnery expert
