= The Quick Fix =

The Quick Fix may refer to:

- "The Quick Fix" (The Shield), the 1st episode of Season 2 (2003) in The Shield
- The Quick Fix (novel), 2013 juvenile novel by Jack D. Ferraiolo
- The Quick Fix, 2021 nonfiction book by Jesse Singal
