= Is (novel) =

1992 novel by Joan Aiken

- First edition (publ. Jonathan Cape)
- Author: Joan Aiken
- Language: English
- Publication date: 1992

Is, known in the United States as Is Underground, first published in 1992, is the eighth book in the series of novels by Joan Aiken normally called the Wolves Chronicles and sometimes the James III sequence. Where previous books have followed the characters Bonny, Sylvia, Simon, and the street-urchin Dido Twite, this marks the first appearance of Dido's sister, Is Twite, as the protagonist. The story follows Is from London to the fictional town of Blastburn (also mentioned in Midnight Is a Place) in the north of England, in her quest to discover the mystery behind the disappearance of many London children and to track down two missing boys in particular. Like the rest of the books in this series, Is takes place in an alternative history version of the early nineteenth century and has elements of steampunk and magical realism.

The UK edition was illustrated, as were most of the Wolves Chronicles and many other Joan Aiken books, by Pat Marriott.

== Plot summary ==
Is Twite, a character introduced in Dido and Pa as Dido's previously unsuspected half-sister, is now living on Blackheath Edge near London with a third, older sister named Penelope (called 'Penny') and their cat, Figgin. When they save a stranger from the wolves that are running wild in the area, only to discover he is a relative, Is takes on the task of continuing the man's search for his missing son Arun. She travels into London to consult with old friends, and there meets the king of England, Richard, who also asks her to look for his own missing son David.

Is's investigations lead her to 'The Playland Express', a secret train spiriting children away from London and north into the part of the country that has recently split off and become autonomous. Is travels with the other children, who believe they are being taken to a better life, but armed with her suspicions and a quick wit, Is makes a successful bid for freedom. Whilst the other children are enslaved and taken to the coal-mines, Is remains at liberty in the overground town of Blastburn. She meets with local relatives, including her uncle Roy, who is the dictator of the new country, and also other residents of the derelict town, including Doctor Lemman, whose apprentice she becomes to excuse her presence in Blastburn (children in that area are all sent to the coal-face). Through this work she discovers that most people in the area now live in an underground town called Holdernesse, set in a vast natural cavern. She also learns more about the coal-mine and the appalling conditions here. Meanwhile, she is also learning about medicine from Dr. Lemman and occasionally experiencing something she comes to call 'the Touch' – a sort of psychic cry for help. She continues to search for the lost boys, aggravating her Uncle Roy, and eventually ends up going to work in the mine herself. Here, she discovers that the king's son is dead, and that her cousin Arun Twite has escaped and suffered some sort of mental breakdown. She discovers 'the Touch' is the collective psychic voice of the enslaved children and together, with Is as a guide and leader, they begin to hone this talent into a means of communication. In this way they are able to organise a full escape when predictions of a tidal wave that will collapse the mine reaches them. After the escape, Is is captured and left to die in the derelict library by her Uncle Roy but with the help of her new friends escapes in time to see the Playland Express taking children back to London and Uncle Roy killed when he runs in front of it. She is left with the ability to mentally talk to her friends all over the country, and with a new companion in Arun, who has recovered from his breakdown.

== Nursery rhymes ==
Unlike the other books in the sequence, chapters in this book are headed with excerpts from the Oxford Nursery Rhyme Book. The story is also prefaced with a poem written by Joan Aiken's sister Jane 'when she was seven, or thereabouts' which has clearly provided some of the inspiration for the story.
