= The Wolves of Willoughby Chase =

1962 children's novel by Joan Aiken

Wolves of Willoughby Chase
- 1st edition, with cover by Pat Marriott
- Author: Joan Aiken
- Language: English
- Series: Wolves Chronicles
- Genre: Alternate history, Children's novel
- Publisher: Jonathan Cape
- Publication date: 1962
- Publication place: United Kingdom
- Media type: Print (hardback & paperback)
- Followed by: Black Hearts in Battersea

The Wolves of Willoughby Chase is a children's novel by Joan Aiken, first published in 1962. Set in an alternative history of England, it tells of the adventures of cousins Bonnie and Sylvia and their friend Simon the goose-boy as they thwart the evil schemes of their governess Miss Slighcarp, and their so-called "teacher" at boarding school, Mrs. Brisket.

The novel is the first in the Wolves Chronicles, a series of books set during the fictional early 19th-century reign of King James the Third. A large number of wolves has migrated from the bitter cold of Europe and Russia into Britain via a new "channel tunnel", and terrorise the inhabitants of rural areas. Aiken wrote the book over a period of years, with a seven-year gap due to her full-time work; the success of this, her second novel, enabled her to quit her job and write full-time.

It is described by John Rowe Townsend as "a tale of double-dyed villainy, with right triumphant in the end".

It was adapted into a film, with the same title, in 1989.

== Plot ==
The story is set at Willoughby Chase, the grand home of Sir Willoughby and Lady Green and their daughter Bonnie.

Due to Lady Green's ill health, Bonnie's parents are taking a holiday in warmer climates touring the Mediterranean by ship, leaving her in the care of a newly arrived distant fourth cousin, Letitia Slighcarp. Also, due to arrive is Bonnie's orphan cousin Sylvia, who lived in London with Sir Willoughby's impoverished but genteel older sister Jane, coming to keep her cousin company in her parents' absence. Sylvia is nervous about the long train ride into the snowy countryside, especially when wolves menace the stopped train; one wolf even breaks through a loose window in Sylvia's carriage, but is fortunately killed by a large and somewhat-strangely-behaving man who is sharing Sylvia's carriage. Once Sylvia arrives at Bonnie's house, the cousins become instant friends. The robust and adventurous Bonnie is eager to show Sylvia the delights of country life, and they embark on an ice-skating expedition almost immediately. Although the adventure ends on a scary note — the girls are chased by the ever-present wolves — all is well thanks to Simon, a resourceful boy who lives on his own in a cave, raising geese and bees.

The girls soon learn that the blissful existence they anticipate together is not to last. With the help of Mr. Grimshaw, the mysterious man from the train, Miss Slighcarp takes over the household, dismissing all but the most untrustworthy household servants, threatening to arrest those who defy her, wearing Lady Green's gowns and tampering with Sir Willoughby's legal papers. This is the cause for Bonnie to continuously lose her temper. Bonnie and Sylvia also overhear ominous hints about their parents' ship, which has sunk, perhaps intentionally. Bonnie and Sylvia are not without allies: James, the clever footman, who spies on Miss Slighcarp for the girls; Miss Pattern, Bonnie's loving and beloved maid; and the woodcrafty Simon. With their friends, the girls plan to alert the kindly and sensible local doctor to the crimes of Miss Slighcarp and Mr. Grimshaw, but Miss Slighcarp foils the scheme and sends them to a nearby industrial town, to a dismal and horrid orphanage run by the even more horrid Mrs. Brisket and her pretentious, spoiled, unscrupulous and abusive daughter, Diana.

Sylvia quickly weakens and grows ill due to the backbreaking work, frigid rooms, inadequate clothing, and scant meals; the stronger Bonnie realizes they must escape soon. She encounters the faithful Simon, in town to sell his geese and they plot an escape, thanks to some ragged clothes provided in secret by Pattern and a key that Simon copies. Even though it is the dead of winter, the girls are warmer and better fed in Simon's goose-cart than in the dreadful orphanage/workhouse. After Sylvia recovers, the trio embarks on a two-month journey to Aunt Jane in London.

On their arrival, they discover that Aunt Jane is near death from poverty-induced starvation, but with the help of a kind and idiosyncratic doctor downstairs, they nurse her back to health. They also catch Mr. Grimshaw sneaking into the lodging house that night. Confronted by the police and the family's lawyer, Mr. Grimshaw confesses the entire plot, and the girls return to Willoughby Chase, escorted by lawyer Gripe and Bow Street constables. At the mansion, they trick Miss Slighcarp and Mrs. Brisket into revealing their villainy while Mr. Grimshaw and the constables are secretly listening in, and Mrs. Brisket and Miss Slighcarp are arrested. At this moment, Bonnie's parents return, having survived the sinking ship; months in the sunny climate of the Canary Islands have restored Lady Green to health, and Sir Willoughby immediately begins setting Miss Slighcarp's depredations to rights. Bonnie's parents adopt Sylvia and agree to set up a school for Mrs. Brisket's charges and the now-humbled Diana, with a post for Aunt Jane, who had been too proud to accept charity.

== Characters ==
Bonnie Green: Central character of the book. She is adventurous, confident, and often rash. She is somewhat spoiled, but a bright and cheerful girl. She is small but strongly built and full of energy, which makes her more resilient to the harshness of Mrs Brisket's orphanage. She is nice, is courageous, and keenly aware of injustices to others as shown in several scenes where she takes a stand for someone despite the punishments she might receive. She is the only child of Sir Willoughby, and the only child living at the large Willoughby estate.

Sylvia Green: Sylvia is Bonnie's cousin who is coming to stay with her while Bonnie's parents are away on an extended journey. Quiet, reflective, polite, and ladylike, she is willing to step out of her comfort zone to please others. She is also a skilled needleworker. For her, everything at Willoughby Chase estate is extravagant and royal. Despite her sheltered life, she is eager to share Bonnie's adventures. She has fair blond hair and is very delicate, both of build and constitution, so her health fails under the harshness of Mrs Brisket's orphanage. Sylvia's is a cousin to Bonnie and niece of both Sir Willoughby and Aunt Jane, but her parents are never mentioned in the book.

Aunt Jane Green: Aunt Jane is sister to Sir Willoughby and lives alone in London. Sylvia has lived with her for many years, but she is unable to support Sylvia as she grows into womanhood. Jane is aunt to Bonnie and Sylvia and sister to Sir Willoughby Green. She is a good-natured, if somewhat strict and proud woman. A woman of very limited means, despite the wealth of her brother, she nearly starves herself to death because she is too proud to seek assistance. Once recovered, she sets up a proper school for Mrs Brisket's remaining orphans and takes a firm hand in reforming Diana Brisket.

Miss Letitia Slighcarp: Miss Slighcarp is, supposedly, a fourth-cousin to Sir Willoughby, and accepts the role as a form of governess / estate manager while Sir Willoughby and Lady Green take an extended cruise for Lady Green's health. She is a vain, menacing tyrant and a greedy con-artist. She relishes punishing the girls, especially the feisty Bonnie. She is tall, with bony features and is set on having Sir Willoughby's fortune. After taking possession of the estate, she turns it into a high-class boarding school for the children of gentry, as well as for the orphans from Mrs Brisket's orphanage.

Mrs Gertrude Brisket: Sister to Miss Slighcarp (though never mentioned as a cousin to Sir Willoughby), Mrs Brisket is a large, lazy woman with yellow eyes who owns the orphanage to which Bonnie and Sylvia are sent. Although opposite to Miss Slighcarp in appearance, she shares a prideful, domineering nature and demands instant obedience from all of the girls in the orphanage. She is primarily interested in money and runs the orphanage as a work house, only having the girls do academic lessons when representatives from the Board of Orphans are on the premises. She has a teen daughter, Diana, but the status of her husband is never mentioned and it is assumed she is a widow.

Diana Brisket: Mrs Brisket's vindictive, spoiled, and vain teenage daughter. Active socially, she loves being the centre of attention and lording power over other people, and she does not obey her mother. She holds the orphans in contempt and dominates them as her mother does. She is humbled by her mother's downfall and left without resource after her mother's imprisonment. Left at the Willoughby estate, she thrives and blossoms under Aunt Jane's guidance.

Josiah Grimshaw: A former clerk for Mr Gripe, he was dismissed for forgery; he uses this talent to provide fake credentials for Miss Slighcarp and alter Sir Willoughby's will giving her full power over Willoughby Chase. He protects Sylvia from a wolves during the train ride up from London, and pretends to be knocked unconscious by a falling suitcase in order to be carried to the Willoughby estate for care.

Mr. Gripe: He is the family lawyer and a kind-hearted man, who had been an unwitting dupe in the conspiracy to steal Sir Willoughby's estate.

Mrs Moleskin: She is the cook at Mrs Brisket's orphanage. She is a tartar and hits the orphans with whatever comes to hand. Her kitchen is filthy, and her gravy (which Bonnie throws in her face) is rancid.

Pattern: She is Bonnie's kind-hearted maid. She stays in the house after all the other staff are dismissed, just to make sure the girls stay safe, and she assists Simon and James in the two girls' escape from the orphanage.

James: He is the good-natured footman at Willoughby Chase. He contrives to stay on after the other staff are dismissed so he can help to protect the girls from Miss Slighcarp. He assists Simon and Pattern in the girls' escape from the orphanage, and then the police in the arrest of Miss Slighcarp and Mrs Brisket.

Simon: A boy not much older than Bonnie and Sylvia, he ran away from a cruel farmer and lives a self-sufficient life in the caves of Willoughby Chase, keeping geese and bees. He is kind and hard-working, deferential to Bonnie and also protective of her. He rescues Bonnie and Sylvia from wolves early in the book and helps them escape from the orphanage. He wears furs and has a warm voice. He is also a natural artist and uses his skills to earn money on their trip to London.

Lucy and Emma: Girls at the orphanage who become close friends with Bonnie and Sylvia. After being relocated to the Willoughby Estate when the orphanage is moved, at the end of the book they are found locked in the long-forgotten basement dungeons.

Alice: An older and poor-natured inmate of Mrs Brisket's orphanage, notorious for her tale-telling against the other girls in exchange for the reward of cheese.

Dr. Gabriel Field: Downstairs neighbor to Aunt Jane, he takes charge in nursing Aunt Jane back to health and alerts the authorities about the conspirators. He also encourages Simon in art work by becoming a sponsor for him.

Mr. Friendshipp: Civil inspector of the orphanage but lacks the perception to make a competent inspector. He is easily fooled into believing Mrs Brisket's orphanage is well-run, despite the freezing classrooms, the orphans' inadequate clothing, and their emaciation.

Sir Willoughby: He is the owner of Willoughby Chase, father to Bonnie and younger brother to Aunt Jane. He is very wealthy with a large estate, large staff, and large stables. When agreeing to take charge of Sylvia, he shows concern for her by buying ice skates in a variety of sizes to ensure one pair will fit.

Lady Green: Mother to Bonnie, she is wrestling with a lingering illness. At her doctor's recommendation, she and her husband embark on a long sea voyage in hopes of restoring her health. Shipwrecked off the coast of Portugal and picked up a passing cargo ship, several weeks at sea complete the hoped-for cure and she returns to her home full of life and energy. She is a caring mother to Bonnie and aunt to Sylvia.

== Adaptations ==
Film

The 1989 film version was directed by Stuart Orme with a screenplay by William M. Akers. The cast includes Stephanie Beacham as Miss Slighcarp, Mel Smith as Mr. Grimshaw, Geraldine James as Mrs. Brisket, Richard O'Brien as James, and Jane Horrocks as Pattern. Newcomers Emily Hudson and Aleks Darowska played Bonnie and Sylvia.

Although quite faithful to the novel, some characters are omitted (such as Dr. Gabriel Field), others are altered (Mrs. Brisket's daughter Diana is changed into a teenage son named Rupert, who serves as his mother's second-in-command) and the entire final act of the story features considerable changes.

=== Radio ===
On 30 December 1994, BBC Radio 4 broadcast an adaptation of the novel by Eric Pringle directed by Cherry Cookson, with Jane Lapotaire as Mrs. Slighcarp, John Rowe as the Narrator, Emily Watson as Sylvia, Abigail Docherty as Bonnie, and Gavin Muir as Sir Willoughby.

Stage

The book was successfully adapted into a stage play by Russ Tunney for The Nuffield Theatre, Southampton and Forest Forge Theatre Company. Performed by a cast of five with original music, the show completed a National Tour in 2009/10.

It was praised in The Stage : "Wonderful stuff – worth wrapping up warm and turning out on a freezing night for."

The play was performed at the Edinburgh Fringe Festival 2011 by Not Cricket Productions, then also again in 2015 by Eagle House.

The amateur premiere of Tunney's adaptation was presented in January 2014 by Progress Theatre of Reading, Berkshire, UK.

In May 2015, a new adaptation by playwright Peta Duncombe of PYP Scripts was staged by ACTion Community Theatre at the Terry O'Toole Theatre in Lincolnshire.
