= Katherine Marsh =

American writer (born 1974)

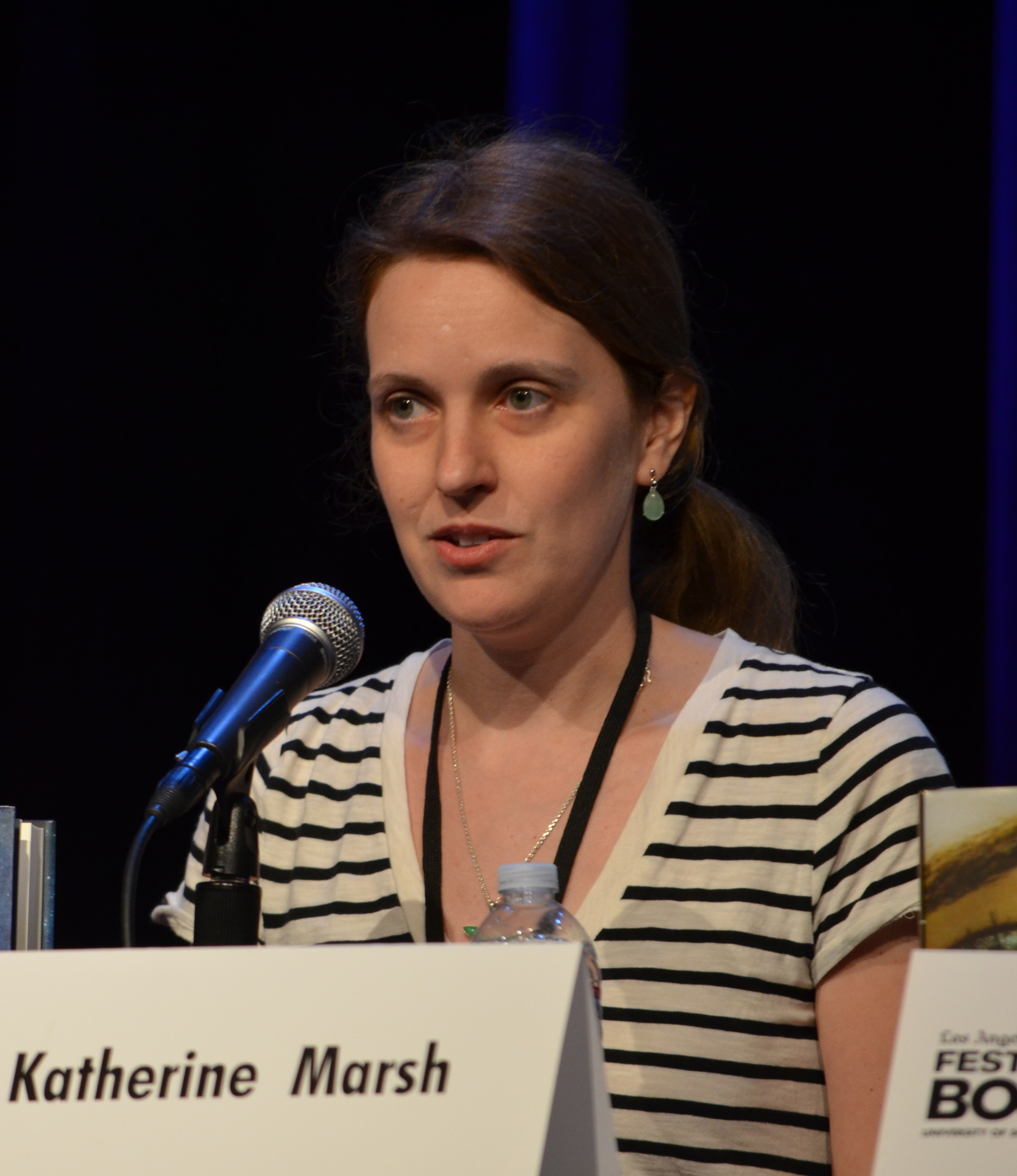
- Katherine Marsh in 2013
- Born: November 11, 1974 (age 51)
- Writing career
- Genre: Children's literature

Katherine Marsh (born November 11, 1974) is an American writer of children's literature, most notably The Night Tourist (2007) and Nowhere Boy (2018). She is also an editor of nonfiction articles and books.

== Life ==
She was a high school teacher before moving to New York City, where she began writing for magazines such as Rolling Stone and Good Housekeeping. Some of her nonfiction stories about her home state of New York have appeared in The New York Times.

She is the author of The Night Tourist, winner of the 2008 Edgar Award for Best Juvenile Mystery, and its sequel, The Twilight Prisoner, which are both set in New York City.

She is now the managing editor of The New Republic, where she specializes in politics and culture. She lives in Washington, DC.

== Books ==
- The Night Tourist (2007)
- The Twilight Prisoner (2009)
- Jepp, Who Defied the Stars (2012)
- The Door by the Staircase (2016)
- Nowhere Boy (2018)
- The Lost Year (2023)
- Medusa (2024)
