= Susan Vaught =

American author (born 1965)

Susan Vaught (born October 22, 1965) is an American author and neuropsychologist.

== Biography ==
Vaught received a Bachelor of Arts degree from the University of Mississippi and a Master of Science from Vanderbilt University. In 1991, she graduated from Vanderbilt with a Doctor of Philosophy in Clinical Psychology and Intellectual/ Developmental Disabilities Research. Since graduation, she has worked as a neuropsychologist, including serving as the Director of Neuropsychology and the Clinical Director for a hospital in Tennessee.

Vaught is autistic. She presently lives in Kentucky with her wife.

== Awards and honors ==
In 1996, Vaught received the SEAAMR Richard B. Dillard Award For Research In The Field Of Developmental Disabilities.

Footer Davis Probably Is Crazy (2015), Super Max and the Mystery of Thornwood’s Revenge (2017), and Me and Sam-Sam Handle the Apocalypse (2019), are Junior Library Guild selections. Bank Street College of Education named Footer Davis Probably Is Crazy one of the "Best Children’s Books of 2016." Trigger received a starred review from Booklist and Publishers Weekly. Things Too Huge to Fix by Saying Sorry received Booklist, Kirkus Reviews, and Publishers Weekly. Me and Sam-Sam Handle the Apocalypse received a starred review from Booklist. Publishers Weekly named it one of the best books published in the summer of 2019. Together We Grow received starred reviews from Booklist, Kirkus Reviews, Publishers Weekly, and School Library Journal.

Awards for Vaught's writing
Year	Title	Award	Result	Ref.
2005	Stormwitch	Andre Norton Award	Nominee	
2005	Stormwitch	Carl Brandon Kindred Award	Nominee	
2006	Stormwitch	ALA Best Books for Young Adults	Selection	
2007	Big Fat Manifesto	South Carolina Book Award for Young Adult Book Award	Nominee	
2007	Trigger	ALA Best Books for Young Adults	Selection	
2009	Big Fat Manifesto	Amelia Bloomer Book List	Selection	
2009	Trigger	South Carolina Book Award for Young Adult Book Award	Nominee	
2009	Trigger	Rhode Island Teen Book Award	Nominee	
2010	Big Fat Manifesto	Popular Paperbacks for Young Adults	Selection	
2012		Deutscher Jugendliteraturpreis for Preis der Jugendjury	Nominee	
2015	Footer Davis Probably Is Crazy	Cybil Award for Middle Grade Fiction	Nominee	
2016	Footer Davis Probably Is Crazy	Edgar Award for Best Juvenile	Winner	
2017	Things Too Huge to Fix by Saying Sorry	Edgar Award for Best Juvenile	Nominee	
2019	Things Too Huge to Fix by Saying Sorry	Truman Readers Award	Nominee	
2020	Me and Sam-Sam Handle the Apocalypse	Edgar Award for Best Juvenile	Winner	
2020	Super Max and the Mystery of Thornwood's Revenge	South Carolina Book Award for Junior Book	Nominee	

== Publications ==
=== Children's ===
- Footer Davis Probably Is Crazy (2015)
- Things Too Huge to Fix by Saying Sorry (2016)
- Super Max and the Mystery of Thornwood's Revenge (2017)
- Me and Sam-Sam Handle the Apocalypse (2019)
- Together We Grow, illustrated by Kelly Murphy (2020)

=== Young adult ===
- Fat Tuesday (2004)
- Stormwitch (2005)
- Trigger (2006)
- Big Fat Manifesto (2007)
- Exposed (2008)
- Assassin's Apprentice (2010)
- Going Underground (2011)
- Freaks Like Us (2012)
- Insanity (2014)

==== L.O.S.T. series ====
The L.O.S.T. series was co-written with R. S. Collins and Debbie Federici.

1. L.O.S.T. (2004)
2. Shadowqueen (2005)
3. Witch Circle (2006)

== External links' ==
- Official website
