= Joan Aiken =

English writer (1924–2004)

Joan Aiken MBE
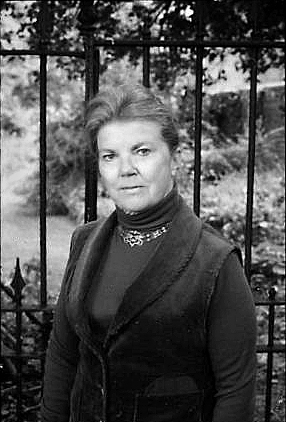
- Aiken at The Hermitage, her home, in 1984
- Born: Joan Delano Aiken; 4 September 1924; Rye, Sussex, England
- Died: 4 January 2004 (aged 79); Petworth, Sussex, England
- Occupation: Writer
- Spouses: Ronald George Brown (m. 1945; died 1955) Julius Goldstein (m. 1976; died 2001)
- Children: 2
- Relatives: Conrad Aiken (father); Jane Aiken Hodge (sister)
- Writing career
- Period: 1955–2004
- Genres: Alternative history, children's literature, supernatural fiction
- Notable work: The Wolves of Willoughby Chase (Wolves Chronicles)
- Notable awards: Guardian Prize; 1969
- Website: www.joanaiken.com

Joan Delano Aiken MBE (4 September 1924 – 4 January 2004) was an English writer specialising in supernatural fiction and children's alternative history novels. In 1999 she was awarded an MBE for her services to children's literature. For The Whispering Mountain, published by Jonathan Cape in 1968, she won the Guardian Children's Fiction Prize, a book award judged by a panel of British children's writers, and she was a commended runner-up for the Carnegie Medal from the Library Association, recognising the year's best children's book by a British writer. (Note: Today there are usually eight books on the Carnegie Medal shortlist. According to CCSU, there were about 160 commendations of two kinds in 49 years from 1954 to 2002, including Aiken and two others for 1968.) She won an Edgar Allan Poe Award (1972) for Night Fall.

== Biography ==
Aiken was born in Mermaid Street in Rye, Sussex, on 4 September 1924. Her father was the American Pulitzer Prize-winning poet Conrad Aiken (1889–1973). Her older brother was the writer and research chemist John Aiken (1913–1990), and her older sister was the writer Jane Aiken Hodge (1917–2009). Their mother, Canadian-born Jessie MacDonald (1889–1970), was a Master's graduate from Radcliffe College, Cambridge, Massachusetts. Jessie and Conrad's marriage was dissolved in 1929, and Jessie married the English writer Martin Armstrong in 1930. Conrad Aiken went on to marry twice more. Together with her brother John and her sister Jane, Joan Aiken wrote Conrad Aiken Remembered (1989), a short appreciation of their father.

Aiken was taught at home by her mother until the age of twelve and from 1936 to 1940 at Wychwood School for girls in North Oxford. She did not attend university. Writing stories from an early age, she finished her first full-length novel when she was sixteen and had her first short story for adults accepted for publication when she was seventeen. In 1941 her first children's story was broadcast on the BBC's Children's Hour.

Aiken worked for the United Nations Information Centre (UNIC) in London between 1943 and 1949. In September 1945 she married Ronald George Brown, a journalist who was also working at UNIC. They had two children before he died in 1955.

After her husband's death, Aiken joined the magazine Argosy, where she worked in various editorial capacities and, she later said, learned her trade as a writer. The magazine was one of many in which she published short stories between 1955 and 1960. During this time she also published her first two collections of children's stories and began work on a children's novel, initially titled Bonnie Green, which was later published in 1962 as The Wolves of Willoughby Chase. By then she was able to write full-time from home, producing two or three books a year for the rest of her life, mainly children's books and thrillers, as well as many articles, introductions and talks on children's literature and on the work of Jane Austen.

In 1976 Aiken married the New York landscape painter and teacher Julius Goldstein (died 2001). They divided their time between her home (the Hermitage in Petworth, Sussex) and his native New York.

In September 1999, she was made a Member of the Order of the British Empire.

Aiken died at home at the age of 79 in 2004. She was survived by her two children.

== Writings ==
Aiken produced more than 100 books, including more than a dozen collections of fantasy stories, plays and poems, and modern and historical novels for adults and children. She was a lifelong fan of ghost stories, particularly those of M. R. James, Fitz James O'Brien and Nugent Barker. As well as writing under her own name, she used the pen name Nicholas Dee for several short stories. Some of her books focus on spine-chilling or supernatural events, including The Windscreen Weepers (stories, 1969), The Shadow Guests (novel, 1980), A Whisper in the Night (stories, 1982), and A Creepy Company (stories, 1993, with variant contents in its US and UK editions). She set her adult supernatural novel The Haunting of Lamb House at Lamb House in Rye (now a National Trust property). This ghost story recounts in fictional form an alleged haunting experienced by two former residents of the house, Henry James and E. F. Benson, both of whom also wrote ghost stories.

Many of Aiken's most popular books, including the Wolves Chronicles (also known as The Wolves of Willoughby Chase series or the James III series), are set in an elaborate alternative history of Britain in which James II was never deposed in the Glorious Revolution, but supporters of the House of Hanover continually agitate against the monarchy. These books also toy with the geography of London, adding a Canal District among other features. Wolves have invaded the country from Europe via the newly built Channel Tunnel. The novels share a varying cast and a variety of interlinked child protagonists—initially Bonnie Green, but subsequently her itinerant friend Simon, Simon's intrepid Cockney friend Dido Twite (the heroine of most of the books), Dido's half-sister Is and Owen Hughes (son of Dido's Royal Navy ally Captain Hughes). In a review of Midwinter Nightingale for the School Library Journal, Susan Patron praised the characterisations and the suspenseful plot and noted that "although the titles in the 'Wolves' series may be read independently", readers may want to read the earlier books first.

Aiken's series of children's books about Arabel and Mortimer were illustrated by Quentin Blake. Others were illustrated by Jan Pieńkowski and Pat Marriott. Pieńkowski won the foremost British award for children's book illustration, the Greenaway Medal, for The Kingdom Under the Sea and Other Stories (Jonathan Cape, 1971), a collection of "unique fairy tales from Eastern Europe and Russia" retold by Aiken. She participated in the Puffin Book Club's annual Children's Literature Summer Camp, run by Colony Holidays, predecessor to ATE Superweeks, along with other popular children's authors such as Ian Serraillier and Clive King. Her novels for adults include several that continue or complement novels by Jane Austen. These include Mansfield Revisited and Jane Fairfax.

== Adaptations ==
Two of Joan Aiken's stories from her 1968 collection A Necklace of Raindrops were adapted into animated short films by director Tatyana Mititella at Soyuzmultfilm studio in the Soviet Union:

- A Rainy Day (Дождливая история, 1988), adapts The Baker's Cat and is set to Paul Whiteman's 1928 song Chiquita and other jazz standards
- Apple Pie (Яблочный пирог, 1991), adapts There's Some Sky in This Pie and also features jazz music

Her first novel in the Wolves Chronicles, The Wolves of Willoughby Chase was filmed in 1989. Directed by Stuart Orme, it starred Stephanie Beacham, Mel Smith and Geraldine James.

Her second, Black Hearts in Battersea, was adapted for television in 1995. Directed by David Bell, it starred Celia Imrie, Annette Badland and Ronald Pickup.

== Selected works ==
=== Wolves Chronicles ===
The Wolves Chronicles vary in length from less than 150 pages to more than 250 pages. Here the novels are listed in narrative order, and their central characters.

==== Main series ====
- The Whispering Mountain (1968), a prequel to the series
- The Wolves of Willoughby Chase (featuring Bonnie Green, Sylvia Green and Simon) (1962)
- Black Hearts in Battersea (featuring Dido Twite and Simon) (1964)
- Nightbirds on Nantucket (Dido Twite) (1966)
- The Stolen Lake (Dido Twite) (1981)
- Limbo Lodge (U.S. title: Dangerous Games) (Dido Twite) (1999)
- The Cuckoo Tree (Dido Twite) (1971)
- Dido and Pa (featuring Dido and Is Twite) (1986)
- Is (U.S. title: Is Underground) (Is Twite) (1992)
- Cold Shoulder Road (Is Twite) (1995)
- Midwinter Nightingale (featuring Dido Twite and Simon) (2003)
- The Witch of Clatteringshaws (featuring Dido Twite and Simon) (2005)

==== Related novels ====
- Midnight Is a Place (1976)

This novel evidently takes place in the same fictional world as the series. Blastburn, the fictional setting of this work, features as the location of Mrs. Brisket's orphanage in The Wolves of Willoughby Chase, but does not otherwise bring elements of the other books. Its setting and time period resemble and satirise the height of the Victorian manufacturing years, rather than the Georgian setting of the other books. "Joan Aiken follows all the conventions of Dickensian fiction with just a little extra to satisfy jaded contemporary tastes. The Grimsby mansion at Midnight Court houses not one, but two unjustly disinherited orphans ...".

=== Arabel and Mortimer series ===
- Arabel's Raven (1972)
- Escaped Black Mamba (1973)
- The Bread Bin (1974)
- Mortimer's Tie (1976)
- Mortimer and the Sword Excalibur (1979)
- The Spiral Stair (1979)
- The Mystery of Mr Jones's Disappearing Taxi (1982)
- Mortimer's Portrait on Glass (1982)
- Mortimer's Cross (1983)
- Mortimer Says Nothing (three stories) (1985)
- Arabel and Mortimer (1992)
- Mortimer's Mine (1994)
- Mayhem in Rumbury (1995)

=== Paget family ===
- The Smile of the Stranger (1978)
- The Lightning Tree (1980); U.S. title, The Weeping Ash
- The Young Lady from Paris (1982); U.S. title, The Girl from Paris

=== Felix trilogy ===
- Go Saddle the Sea (1978)
- Bridle the Wind (1983)
- The Teeth of the Gale (1988)

=== "Jane Austen" novels ===
- Mansfield Revisited (1984)
- Jane Fairfax: The Secret Story of the Second Heroine in Jane Austen's Emma (1990)
- Eliza’s Daughter (1994)
- Emma Watson: The Watsons Completed (1996)
- The Youngest Miss Ward (1998)
- Lady Catherine's Necklace (2000)

=== Other books ===
- All You've Ever Wanted and Other Stories (1953)
- More Than You Bargained For and Other Stories (1955)
- The Kingdom and The Cave (1960)
- The Silence of Herondale (1964)
- The Fortune Hunters (1965)
- A Necklace of Raindrops (1968)
- Armitage, Armitage, Fly Away Home (1968)
- Night Fall (1969)
- A Small Pinch of Weather and Other Stories (1969)
- The Windscreen Weepers and Other Tales of Horror and Suspense (1969)
- Smoke from Cromwell's Time and Other Stories (1970)
- The Embroidered Sunset (1970)
- The Green Flash (1971)
- The Kingdom Under the Sea and Other Stories (1971)
- All and More (1971)
- A Cluster of Separate Sparks (1972)
- A Harp of Fishbones (1972)
- The Butterfly Picnic (1973)
- Dark Interval (1974)
- Beware of the Bouquet (1975)
- The Crystal Crow (1975)
- Voices in an Empty House (1975)
- Castle Barebane (1976)
- A Bundle of Nerves (1976)
- The Skin Spinners (1976)
- The Five-Minute Marriage (1977)
- The Faithless Lollybird and Other Stories (1977)
- The Far Forests (1977)
- Last Movement (1978)
- Tale of a One-Way Street (1978)
- A Touch of Chill (1979) (not to be confused with the separate short-story collection titled A Touch of Chill: Tales for Sleepless Nights (1980))
- A Touch of Chill: Tales for Sleepless Nights (1980) (not to be confused with the separate short-story collection titled A Touch of Chill (1979))
- The Shadow Guests (1980)
- Foul Matter (1983)
- A Whisper in the Night (1984)
- Up the Chimney Down and Other Stories (1984)
- The Last Slice of Rainbow and other stories (1985)
- Past Eight O'Clock (1986)
- A Goose on Your Grave (1987)
- Deception (1988); U.S. title, If I Were You
- Return to Harken House (1988)
- Blackground (1989)
- The Moon's Revenge (1990)
- Morningquest (1992)
- The Winter Sleepwalker : And other stories (1994)
- The Cockatrice Boys (1996)
- Moon Cake and Other Stories (1998)
- The Scream (2002)
- Snow Horse and other stories (2004)
- The Monkey's Wedding and Other Stories (2011)
- The People in the Castle: Selected Strange Stories (2016)
- Stoneywish and other chilling stories (2020)
- Weather Witches and Wise Women (2023)
