= Lamarsh =

Village in Essex, England

Coordinates: 51.9873°N 0.7522°E

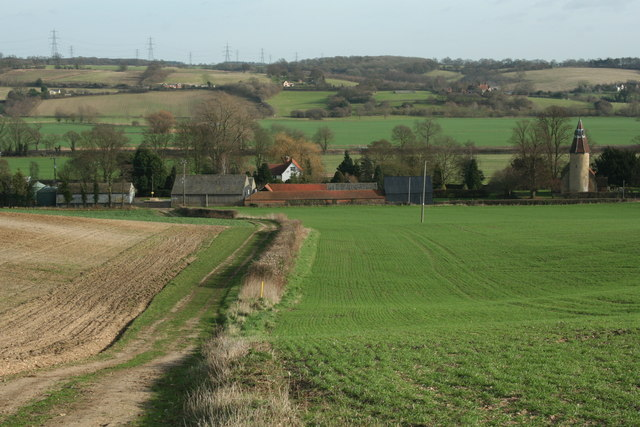
- Lamarsh hall and church

- Location within Essex
- Population: 188 (Parish, 2021)
- Civil parish: Lamarsh
- Shire county: Essex
- Region: East
- Country: England
- Sovereign state: United Kingdom
- Post town: Bures
- Postcode district: CO8
- Dialling code: 01787
- Police: Essex
- Fire: Essex
- Ambulance: East of England

Lamarsh is a village and a civil parish in the Braintree District, in the county of Essex, England. It is near the large village of Bures and the village of Alphamstone. The village is west of the River Stour. It has a pub, a village hall and a church called The Friends of Holy Innocents Church. At the 2021 census the parish had a population of 188.

The name Lamarsh comes from the phrase "Loamy marsh". This is derived from the Old English terms lām and mersc, which translate into loam or clay and a marsh respectively.

In the 1870s, Lamarsh was described as:

"LAMARSH, a parish, with a village, in the district of Sudbury and county of Essex; adjacent to the river Stour at the boundary with Suffolk, 2½ miles NW of Bures r. station, and 4 SSE of Sudbury."

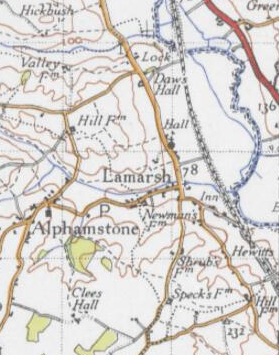
Historical map excerpt of the parish of Lamarsh

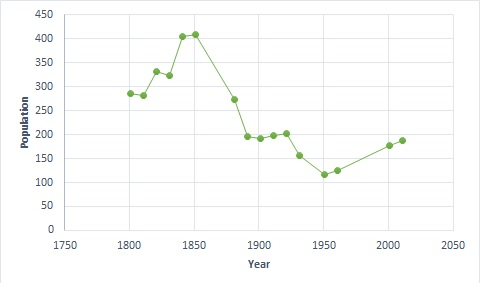
Total population for Lamarsh, Essex as reported by the Census of Population from 1801 to 2011.

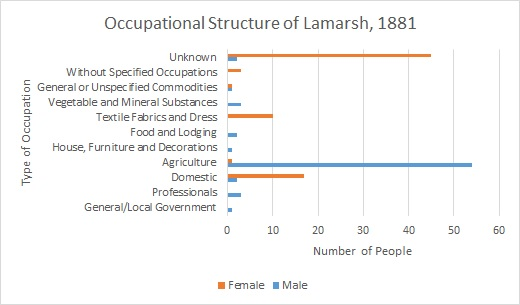
The occupational structure of Lamarsh Civil Parish, Essex, as reported by the 1881 census.

== The Parish ==
The Parish is made up of 934 acres. It was larger until 1884 as it included 200 acres from farms to the South of the village. The main houses in the Parish are Lamarsh Hall and Daws Hall. The Parish contains 22 listed properties. The Parish contains 86 dwellings, all of which unshared.

The village has no shops but does contain a public house. The Lamarsh Lion, constructed in the 14th century, has been in community ownership through the Lamarsh Lion Community Pub Ltd since 2018. Over 450 local investors raised £495,000 to purchase and restore the pub. Often referred to as the "Painter's Pub", due to having been visited by John Constable and Thomas Gainsborough, the building overlooks the Stour Valley.

== Population ==
The population of Lamarsh was 285 in 1801 before peaking at 409 in 1851. There was then a significant drop in the population in 1891 to 196 and the population never again went above 202. This could be a result of the drastic fall in the size of the parish as it dropped from 1,268 acres in 1881 to 940 acres in 1891 and therefore cutting out some of the population.

The total population is now 187 as of 2011, with 96 males and 91 females residing in Lamarsh. The area is predominantly White British, with 178 or 95.2% of people representing this ethnic group. The next highest is White and Asian with only 3 people or 1.6% classed as this ethnicity. This shows how there is little ethnic diversity in this parish. With there being such a high proportion of White British in the village, as expected the main religion is Christianity with 124 or 66.3% declaring themselves as within this category. 37 people or 19.8% of the parish's population declared themselves as having no religion.

With so many of the residents being White British, as expected a strong majority of the village's population stated that England was their country of birth in the 2011 census, with 92% or 172 people being English. The rest of the population's birthplaces are spread across other countries such as Wales, Scotland, Ireland and other EU member countries.

== Occupational Structure ==
The historical occupation data for Lamarsh is most detailed in 1881, stating the occupation of the 69 males and 77 females in the village. The males predominantly worked in agriculture with 54 out of the 69 in this occupation. While females worked mostly in domestic services or offices, however most women, 45, were listed unknown occupation, which could suggest they may have been housewives. Looking at the population of males and females in the parish in the same year shows that there were 141 males and 133 females in the village in 1881. This means that over half of the males and females were either not of working age or that many were left unaccounted when documenting occupational data.

Lamarsh now has 82 of its 187 residents in employment. 42 of these are male and 39 of these are female. 25 or 30.5% of employed people in the village are classified as being in a Professional Occupation. This is significantly more than there was in 1881 as data shows there being only 3 professionals in Lamarsh at that time. The second largest occupation that people are employed in is Associated Professional and Technical Occupation with 17 of the 82 employed people, or 20.7%, being categorised as this. Where in 1881 the largest occupation was agriculture with 55 workers, this occupation is now not as prominent in Lamarsh with only 2 people employed. This shows that overall in Lamarsh there has been a shift from agricultural occupations to more people having a professional occupation.

== Social structure ==
There are also census data from 1831 detailing the parish's social structure, classified through occupations being grouped by status. The data show that 73 people were classed as labourers and servants, 12 as middling sorts and 7 as employers and professionals. This demonstrates how the parish was predominantly made up of lower class, manual workers who would have been employed by the richer employers and professionals.

== Parish church ==
The Holy Innocents Church is believed to have been built around 1140. It has been given Grade 1 listing by English Heritage meaning it is of the highest architectural quality. Its dedication to "Holy Innocents" is rare as it is one of only five churches in England to have this. It stands in the middle of the parish with its walls built of flint-rubble that is rendered in concert, while its roof is tiled. A large "round tower" was also built to the west of the church and in the 19th century was capped by an Essex Spire which went under repair in both 1948 and 1974. Built 100 yards north of the church is Lamarsh Hall with a moat that surrounds it.

== Notable residents ==
Sefton Delmer, the journalist and propagandist for the British government lived there. During the Second World War he led a black propaganda campaign against Hitler by radio from England.

Robert Bamford one of the two founders of Aston Martin was born in 1883 in Lamarsh.
