= Matilda Etches =

British fashion and costume designer (1898–1974)

- Born: Muriel Matilda Etches; 1898; Rotherham, Yorkshire, England
- Died: 1974 (aged 75–76)
- Occupations: Fashion designer and couturier; film and theatre costume designer
- Spouse(s): Robert Bamford (m. 1919; div. 1927) Paul Homan (m. 1950)
- Children: 1
- Relatives: Robin Jacques (son-in-law)

Muriel Matilda Etches (1898 – 18 April 1974) was a British fashion designer, couturier, and costume designer. She first went into business in 1934, and found widespread fame in the 1940s. As a theatre and film costume designer, she worked with Sophie Fedorovitch and Cecil Beaton. Clothes that she created in the 1940s were the first modern fashion items to be honoured as key acquisitions by London's Victoria and Albert Museum.

== Early life ==
Etches was born in Rotherham, Yorkshire. She was the daughter of Charles Thomas Watkins Etches (1874–1964) and Agnes Helena Etches (nee Woollen). Her father was a captain in The King's Own Yorkshire Light Infantry during World War I.

== Career ==
Etches started a dressmaking business in 1934, but financial problems led to it being dissolved the following year. She started a new business in the late 1930s, and had widespread fame in the 1940s. According to a feature in Vogue, "Her clothes philosophy is for undating simplicity, for an elegance which relies on cut rather than trimming and above all for comfort: this last, an unusual and very welcome viewpoint." Her clients included the actress Vivien Leigh, Margot Fonteyn, Glynis Johns, Constance Collier, Christine Norden, Paulette Goddard, and Valerie Hobson.

Etches was also a costume designer for theatre and film, and worked with theatre designer Sophie Fedorovitch, and extensively with Cecil Beaton. According to the Victoria and Albert Museum (V&A), "Matilda Etches is now almost entirely forgotten except as a theatre, ballet and opera costume-maker. However, she was an extremely talented couturier, whose fashionable clothes were innovative and very carefully made."

== Personal life ==
In 1919, Etches married the engineer Robert Bamford, who founded a company that became Aston Martin. They had a daughter, Patricia Bamford, who married the illustrator Robin Jacques.

In 1950, she married the American economist and economics advisor, Paul Homan.

She spent her later life at 19 Abbey Road in Brighton. After her death, Cecil Beaton wrote an obituary.

== Legacy ==
Several Etches pieces are in the permanent collection of the Victoria and Albert Museum. Her 1948 evening dress of printed cotton is described as "an haute-couture interpretation of the wrapped garments traditionally worn by West African women", and a 1949 evening cape. In 1969, Etches donated selected items, and her cotton dress and evening cape were considered by senior V&A officials to be key acquisitions, the first modern fashion items to be so honoured.

== Filmography as costume designer ==
- The Life and Death of Colonel Blimp (1943), with Joseph Buto
- Caesar and Cleopatra (1945)
- Beware of Pity (1946)
- Gaiety George (1946)
