= The Wolves of Willoughby Chase (film) =

1989 film by Stuart Orme

- Directed by: Stuart Orme
- Written by: Joan Aiken (book); William M. Akers (screenplay)
- Produced by: Raymond Day (associate producer); Mark Forstater (producer)
- Starring: Stephanie Beacham; Mel Smith
- Cinematography: Paul Beeson
- Edited by: Martin Walsh
- Music by: Colin Towns
- Release date: 1989
- Running time: 92 min (US); 93 min (UK)
- Country: United Kingdom
- Language: English
- Budget: $5 million

The Wolves of Willoughby Chase is a 1989 dark fantasy film directed by Stuart Orme (in his theatrical directorial debut) with a screenplay by William M. Akers. The film was based on the 1962 novel of the same name, written by Joan Aiken. Like the book, the film is set in an alternate history version of nineteenth century England where wolves roam the countryside.

== Plot ==
Bonnie is the daughter of Lord and Lady Willoughby, who live at the country estate Willoughby Chase. Lady Willoughby is ill, and the couple plan to recuperate on the Mediterranean. In London, Bonnie's cousin, Sylvia, is leaving her impoverished Aunt Jane (Lord Willoughby's cousin) to keep Bonnie company while her parents are away. On the train, she meets a mysterious man, Mr. Grimshaw. At Willoughby Chase, a beautiful middle-aged woman arrives: she is Bonnie and Sylvia's cousin and their new governess, Letitia Slighcarp. The following morning, Bonnie travels in a carriage to pick up Sylvia. When the train arrives at the station, Grimshaw is knocked unconscious after wolves attack it. Bonnie and Sylvia take him back to Willoughby Chase. Bonnie's parents leave aboard the Thessaly.

The next day, Bonnie and Sylvia go out on a sleigh and are menaced by wolves, but Simon, a boy who lives in a nearby cave, rescues them. The girls return to discover that Miss Slighcarp has dismissed all the servants except for James, a footman, and the maid Pattern. Slighcarp refuses to explain the servants' dismissal, gives the girls porridge instead of their usual feast and scolds Bonnie after she accidentally spills milk on her father's farewell letter; Bonnie begins to suspect her governess's true nature is not benevolent.

The girls catch Slighcarp in Lady Willoughby's best dress. Bonnie demands she take it off and throws water over her. Slighcarp then locks Bonnie in a cupboard in the schoolroom, and Sylvia sees that Slighcarp has ordered James to get rid of all the toys. Sylvia steals the key from Slighcarp, who is bathing, and frees Bonnie. They overhear Slighcarp revealing she has forged a copy of Lord Willoughby's will (with Grimshaw's help; he is a master forger and her ally) and prearranged the sinking of the Thessaly to claim his fortune. Grimshaw throws the real will into the fireplace but Bonnie and Sylvia rescue part of it, and Sylvia locks her back in the cupboard to avoid discovery. Bonnie pretends to have gone manic after being in the cupboard too long, in an attempt to lure the local physician, Dr. Morne, to rescue them; the plan fails, and Miss Slighcarp burns a letter addressed to him.

Slighcarp takes the girls to an orphanage in the industrial town of Blastburn, run by Gertrude Brisket (an old friend of Slighcarp's) and her teenaged son, Rupert. They have to work in a laundry attached to the orphanage, with dangerous machinery that keeps breaking down - Sylvia is nearly killed after Rupert forces her to fix it from a very high and rickety catwalk. Later, a small boy named Joey, who has tried to save Sylvia, dies after he accidentally falls into a laundry tub. Bonnie challenges Brisket publicly about the conditions in the laundry, and her and Sylvia are locked in the coal-cellar as a result. Meanwhile, Slighcarp learns that the Thessaly has sunk, and returns to Blastburn; Simon sneaks into her carriage unnoticed. Slighcarp tells Brisket they will have to dispose of the girls.

Simon attempts to help Bonnie and Sylvia escape. When they are discovered midway through the rescue attempt, Rupert and Slighcarp chase the girls through the facility, but Rupert falls into a giant mangle from the catwalk and is crushed. Simon and the girls escape in Slighcarp's carriage and arrive at Willoughby Chase. Slighcarp and Brisket follow in a motorized sleigh, but Slighcarp accidentally pushes Brisket off and she is eaten by wolves. Slighcarp then loses control of the sleigh which explodes due to overheating; she is presumed dead.

James learns that the Willoughbys are alive, and he and Pattern capture Grimshaw as he attempts to escape. Bonnie and Sylvia return to the house, but some wolves have entered and begin to chase them. They try to escape to Simon's cave, but Slighcarp unexpectedly intercepts them. Although she has survived the explosion, her face is disfigured by burns and her elegant clothes are charred rags. She threatens to kill the girls and tries to destroy the remaining part of the original will, but Bonnie pushes her into the stove and sets her dress on fire; she flees the house shrieking and extinguishes her dress in the snow. Bonnie's parents return, having survived the sinking of the ship and being stranded on a tropical island. Slighcarp, in her attempt to flee, is devoured by wolves near the grounds.

Grimshaw is arrested after trying to steal the estate's silver. Lord Willoughby gives Aunt Jane the mansion's East Wing, so that she has a place to live and Sylvia does not have to leave her cousin behind.

== Cast ==
- Stephanie Beacham as Letitia Slighcarp
- Mel Smith as Mr. Grimshaw
- Emily Hudson as Bonnie Willoughby
- Aleks Darowska as Sylvia
- Geraldine James as Gertrude Brisket
- Richard O'Brien as James
- Jane Horrocks as Pattern
- Lynton Dearden as Simon
- Jonathan Coy as Lord Willoughby
- Eleanor David as Lady Willoughby
- Gillian Hanna as Mrs. Shubunkin
- Dilys Hamlett as Aunt Jane
- Abbie Dabner as Rupert Brisket
- Jirí Lábus as Dr. Morne
- Rebecca Callard as Emma
- William Martin as Joey
- Trevor Byfield as Train Driver
- Robert Hamilton as Coal Man

== Music ==
Colin Towns' original score to The Wolves of Willoughby Chase was released in 1995 by Digital TER Records. Unfortunately the album only includes cues of certain scenes while the rest of the score remains unreleased or incomplete; such as Letitia Slighcarp's arrival to Willoughby Chase, the scene where Slighcarp locks Bonnie in the schoolroom wardrobe, the dismissal of the servants, the introduction before the journey to Blastburn, the entire first portion of the chase sequence in the Blastburn workhouse and the final moments of the motorized sleigh sequence, among others.

All music is composed by Colin Towns.

The Wolves of Willoughby Chase (Original Motion Picture Soundtrack)
No.	Title	Length
1.	"Willoughby House"	2:15
2.	"Main Theme"	2:09
3.	"Rocking Horse"	1:38
4.	"Bonnie Collects Sylvia"	4:07
5.	"Playing in the Snow"	1:32
6.	"Simon's Cave"	3:11
7.	"Slighcarp in the Bath"	1:55
8.	"Secret Passage"	2:24
9.	"Journey to Blastburn"	1:47
10.	"Mrs. Briskett"	0:59
11.	"Home Thoughts"	1:34
12.	"Collage"	1:30
13.	"Dangerous Laundry"	2:02
14.	"Quick They've Escaped"	1:50
15.	"The Ski Sledge"	2:51
16.	"Theme"	0:19
17.	"Slighcarp the Witch"	1:28
18.	"The Parents Return"	1:36
19.	"Sufficient for Her Needs"	0:54
20.	"Main Themes"	3:04
Total length:		35:86
