= Debbi Michiko Florence =

American children's writer

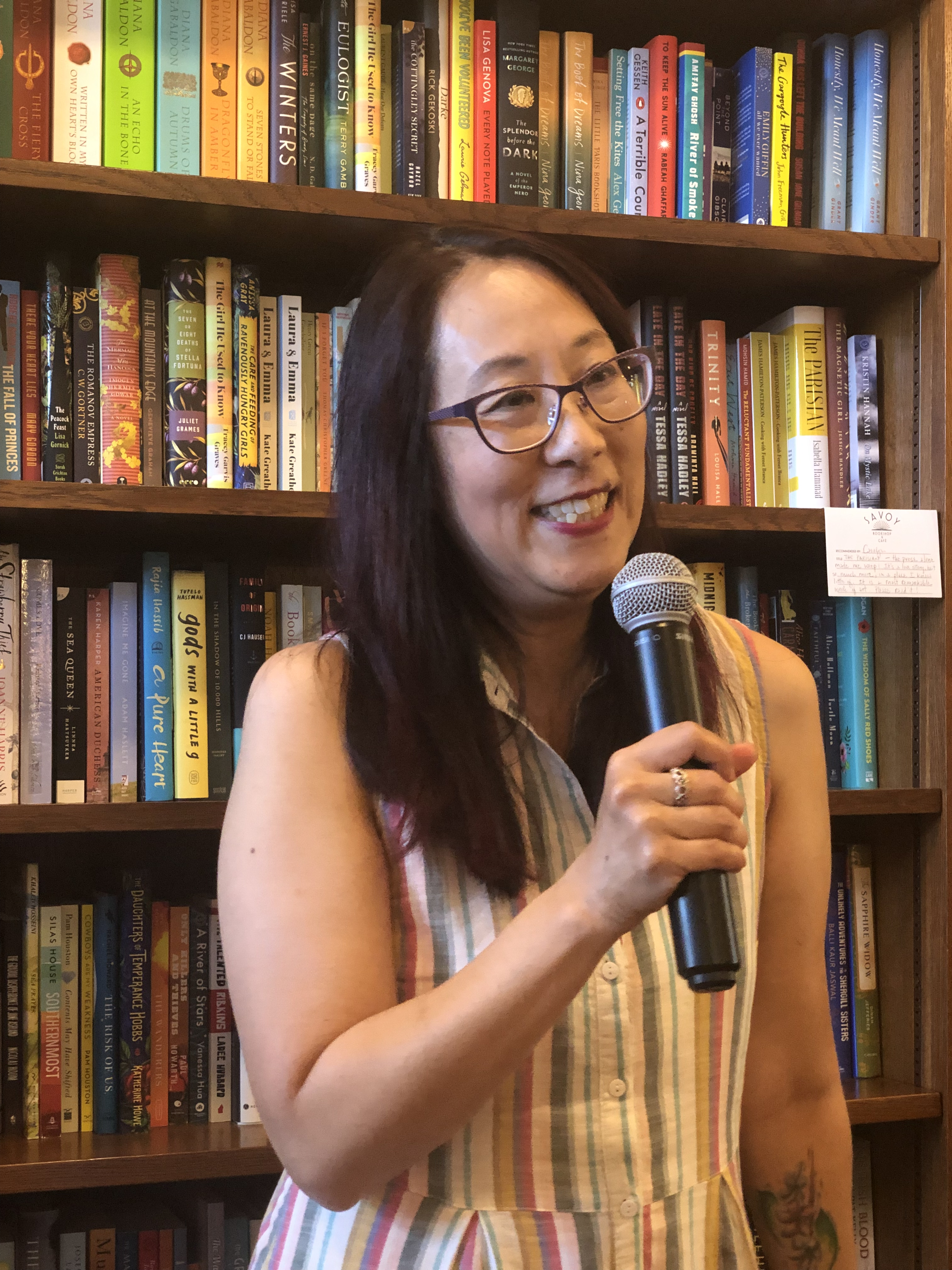
- At a book signing in 2019
- Born: 1964 or 1965 (age 61–62); San Francisco, California
- Education: University of California, Davis
- Occupation: Children's writer
- Website: debbimichikoflorence.com

Debbi Michiko Florence (born 1964 or 1965) is an American children's writer. She is known for her Jasmine Toguchi series of chapter books, the first of which is Jasmine Toguchi, Mochi Queen (2017).

== Biography ==
Florence was born in San Francisco, California, into a Japanese American family and grew up in Los Angeles. She was named after Empress Michiko, then the crown princess of Japan. As the grandchildren of Japanese-born emigrants, she is a part of the cultural generation known as the Sansei.

An animal lover, Florence held several jobs working with animals and obtained a zoology degree at the University of California, Davis. After obtaining a teaching certificate and briefly teaching at a middle school, she secured an associate curator position at a zoo. She began a writing career after her marriage and later moved to Mystic, Connecticut. She is known for her Jasmine Toguchi series of chapter books, the first of which is Jasmine Toguchi, Mochi Queen (2017). Jasmine Toguchi, Drummer Girl won the 2018 Cybils Award and the 2019 Maryland Blue Crab Young Reader Award. In 2017, she co-founded a soy sauce brand named Moromi with local chef James Wayman and her husband, Bob Florence, who previously worked as a chemist at General Electric and Google. A Study In Secrets (2025) was nominated for the Edgar Allan Poe Award for Best Juvenile.

With authors Stacey Lee, Kat Cho, Traci Chee, and Van Hoang, Florence organized an auction to fundraise for Stop AAPI Hate and #HateIsAVirus in light of rising anti-Asian xenophobia and racism connected to the COVID-19 pandemic in 2021. She spoke to Publishers Weekly in 2024 about the impact of an ongoing wave anti-Asian sentiment and book banning in the US: "These book bans have made me hyperaware that there are people who don't want me or my characters to exist."

== Selected publications ==
=== Picture books and graphic novels ===
- Michalak, Jamie; Florence, Debbi Michiko (2021). Niki Nakayama: A Chef's Tale in 13 Bites. Illustrated by Yuko Jones. Farrar, Straus and Giroux. ISBN 978-0-374-31387-6.
- Florence, Debbi Michiko (2025). Monster Maker: The Strange Creatures of Mark Nagata. Illustrated by Inko Ai Takita. Reycraft Books. ISBN 978-1-478-89063-8.

=== Chapter books ===
- Florence, Debbi Michiko (2017). Jasmine Toguchi, Mochi Queen. Illustrated by Elizabet Vukovic. Farrar, Straus and Giroux. ISBN 978-0-374-30410-2.
- — (2018). Jasmine Toguchi, Drummer Girl. Illustrated by Elizabet Vukovic. Farrar, Straus and Giroux. ISBN 978-0-374-30416-4.
- — (2019). Truman the Dog. Illustrated by Melanie Demmer. Picture Window Books. ISBN 978-1-5158-4560-7.

=== Middle grade novels ===
- Florence, Debbi Michiko (2020). Keep It Together, Keiko Carter. Scholastic. ISBN 978-1-338-60752-9.
- — (2021). Just Be Cool, Jenna Sakai. Scholastic. ISBN 978-1-338-67156-8.
- — (2022). Sweet and Sour. Scholastic. ISBN 978-1-338-67159-9.
- — (2023). This Is How I Roll A Wish Novel. Scholastic. ISBN 978-1-338-78556-2.
- Oh, Ellen, ed. (2024). On the Block: Stories of Home. Crown Books for Young Readers. ISBN 9780593648445.
- Florence, Debbi Michiko (2025). A Study In Secrets. Aladdin. ISBN 9781665950473.
