= Frances O'Roark Dowell =

Children's book writer (born 1964)

- Born: May 30, 1964 (age 62); Berlin, Germany
- Education: Wake Forest University (B.A.); University of Massachusetts Amherst (M.F.A.)
- Occupation: Author
- Spouse: Clifton Dowell
- Children: Emily Dowell, Will Dowell.
- Writing career
- Language: English
- Genre: Middle-grade fiction
- Notable works: Dovey Coe, Shooting the Moon
- Notable awards: Edgar Award

Frances O'Roark Dowell is an American author of middle-grade fiction, including Dovey Coe (2000), The Secret Language of Girls, Shooting the Moon, and Falling In. Her books have received numerous awards, including an Edgar (Dovey Coe), the William Allen White Children's Book Award (Dovey Coe), the Christopher Award (Shooting the Moon), the VOYA Book Award (Where I'd Like to Be), and the Boston Globe-Horn Book Award for Excellence in Children's Fiction, Honor Book (Shooting the Moon).

Dovey Coe has been translated into Chinese, French and German. The Secret Language of Girls has been translated into Polish.

== Biography ==
The daughter of a US Army lawyer, Dowell was born in Germany and moved around frequently as a child. After graduating from high school in Texas, she completed undergraduate studies in English at Wake Forest University and a Master of Fine Arts in Creative Writing with a concentration in poetry from the University of Massachusetts Amherst. She lives in Durham, North Carolina with her husband and two children.

== Awards and honors ==
The Bulletin of the Center for Children's Books named Sam the Man & the Rutabaga Plan, as one of the best fictional children's books of 2017.

- 2001: Edgar Allan Poe Award for Best Juvenile, Dovey Coe
- 2003: William Allen White Children's Book Award, 6th–8th Grade, Dovey Coe
- 2008: Boston Globe-Horn Book Award Honor, Shooting the Moon
- 2009: Christopher Award, Books for Young People - Ages 10–12, Shooting the Moon

== Published works ==
=== Standalone books ===
- Dovey Coe (2000)
  - Chinese translation: 我不是兇手 (Wo bu shi xiong shou; I'm not the murderer) – Taipei: The Eastern Publishing Co., Ltd, 2002. ISBN 978-957-570-676-0
  - French translation: Accusée! – Bayard Jeunesse, 2005. ISBN 978-2-7470-1176-1
  - German translation: Dunkler Sommer über Indian Creek – Weinheim: Beltz & Gelberg, 2002. ISBN 978-3-407-79840-4
- Where I'd Like to Be (2003)
  - Salani Gl'Istrici: Solo un ritaglio di casa Illustrazioni di Francesca Bazzurro (2004 Italy)
- Chicken Boy (2005)
- Shooting the Moon (2008)
- Falling In (2010)
- Ten Miles Past Normal (2011)
- The Second Life of Abigail Walker (2012)
- Anybody Shining (2014)
- Trouble the Water (2016)
- Birds in the Air (2016)

=== The Secret Language of Girls ===
- The Secret Language of Girls (2004)
  - Polish translation: Sekretny język dziewczyn ISBN 978-83-60010-91-4
- The Kind of Friends We Used To Be (2009)
- The Sound of Your Voice, Only Really Far Away (2013)

=== From the Highly Scientific Notebooks of Phineas L. Macguire ===
- Phineas L. MacGuire ... Erupts!: The First Experiment (2006)
- Phineas L. MacGuire ... Gets Slimed! (2007)
- Phineas L. MacGuire ... Blasts Off! (2008)
- Phineas L. MacGuire ... Gets Cooking! (2012)

=== Sam the Man ===
- Sam the Man and the Chicken Plan (2016)
- Sam the Man and the Rutabaga Plan (2017)
