= The Whispering Mountain =

1968 book by Joan Aiken

- First edition
- Author: Joan Aiken
- Language: English
- Publisher: Jonathan Cape
- Publication date: 1968
- ISBN: 9780765342416

The Whispering Mountain is a 1968 book by Joan Aiken. For this book, published by Jonathan Cape, she won the Guardian Children's Fiction Prize, a once-in-a-lifetime book award judged by a panel of British children's writers, and she was a commended runner-up for the Carnegie Medal from the Library Association, recognising the year's best children's book by a British writer.
