= The Night Tourist =

2007 children's fantasy novel by Katherine Marsh

- First edition
- Author: Katherine Marsh
- Cover artist: David Frankland
- Language: English
- Series: Jack Perdu
- Genre: Children's literature, fantasy, mystery
- Publisher: Hyperion Books for Children
- Publication date: 2007
- Media type: Print
- Pages: 232
- ISBN: 978-1-4231-0689-0
- Followed by: The Twilight Prisoner

The Night Tourist is a 2007 children's fantasy novel by Katherine Marsh. It is the first book in the Jack Perdu series and received the Edgar Award for Best Juvenile Mystery.

== Plot summary ==
9th Grader Jack Perdu lives with his father on the Yale campus. After Jack encounters a near fatal accident when he got hit by a car one winter night, his father sends him to New York City to visit a mysterious doctor (Dr. Lyons) who specializes in death. After an unusually brief meeting with Dr. Lyons, Jack returns to Grand Central Station to catch a train back home. He decides that it would be a shame to leave NYC without sightseeing first and squeezes himself into a nearby tour group by some pillars. While the group moves on with the tour, Jack stays behind and meets a girl named Euri. She offers to give him a tour of Grand Central Station and take him to places only 'True Urban Explorers' would know of.

Euri shows him a secret door on the sixth track which leads to a bunch of stairs. 9 floors down, Jack discovers the New York Underworld. A place where the dead gather to solve their problems before they move on to Elysium. Jack and Euri are chased by two security guards and their big three headed dog Cerberus. Euri pulls Jack into a corner to hide and confesses that she is actually a ghost and she wants to live again. Jack promises Euri that he will help her escape to the human world. He tells Euri about his mother and Euri promises to help him find her.

In the end, Jack meets his mother and helps her move on. He tries to bring Euri back to the Human World but fails in doing so. Jack and his father move back to NYC, Jack starts school there, and he becomes friends with a girl in his Latin Class. He temporarily loses his ability to see ghosts but soon regains it when he sees Euri sitting on a windowsill, watching him. He tries to apologize to her for not being able to bring her back with him but she puts her finger on her lips, indicating that she already knows what he's going to say.

== Reception ==
The Night Tourist was positively received. Publishers Weekly described this book as being both compelling and satisfying, describing it as a reworking of the Orpheus and Eurydice myth. As well, this novel won the Edgar Award for Best Work of Juvenile Fiction (2008).

== Film adaptation ==
In 2010, Illumination Entertainment acquired the rights to an animated adaption of the book.
