= Robert Bamford =

English engineer and entrepreneur (1883–1942)

- Born: 16 June 1883; Lamarsh, Essex, England
- Died: 16 April 1942 (aged 58); Brighton, Sussex, England
- Occupations: Engineer, entrepreneur
- Known for: Founding Bamford & Martin (later Aston Martin)
- Spouse: Matilda Etches (m. 1919; div. 1927)
- Children: 1
- Relatives: Edward Bamford (brother); Robin Jacques (son-in-law)

Robert Bamford (16 June 1883 – 16 April 1942) was an English engineer who co-founded Bamford & Martin, which later became Aston Martin, with Lionel Martin in 1913. Before his career in the car industry he was active as a racing cyclist.

== Family background ==
His parents married on Tuesday 18 April 1882 at St Luke's church on Bloomfield Road in South Lyncombe, Bath (on the A367). His father, who attended Trinity College, Cambridge, was the eldest son of the vicar of Poulton, Gloucestershire, who conducted the service. His mother was the second daughter of an Australian, Robert Porter of Westfield House, on Bloomfield Road, in Bath.

== Early life ==
He was born on 16 June 1883 at Lamarsh Lodge, Lamarsh, in Essex to the Rev. Robert Bamford (1854–1898) and Blanch Edith Bamford (née Porter) (26 May 1856 - 5 March 1936).

The Rev. Robert Bamford served as curate of Thornbury, Gloucestershire (1880-1881), curate of St John's, Ladywood, Birmingham (1881-1882), curate of Lamarsh, Essex (1882-1885), curate of Holy Trinity, Lambeth (1885-1886), leaving Lamarsh in May 1885.

Robert Bamford attended Sherborne School as a day boy from May 1897 to April 1900. During the First World War he served for one year as private in The London Regiment, 25th (County of London) Cyclist Battalion, and then as a lieutenant with the Army Service Corps (RASC), Mechanical Transport.

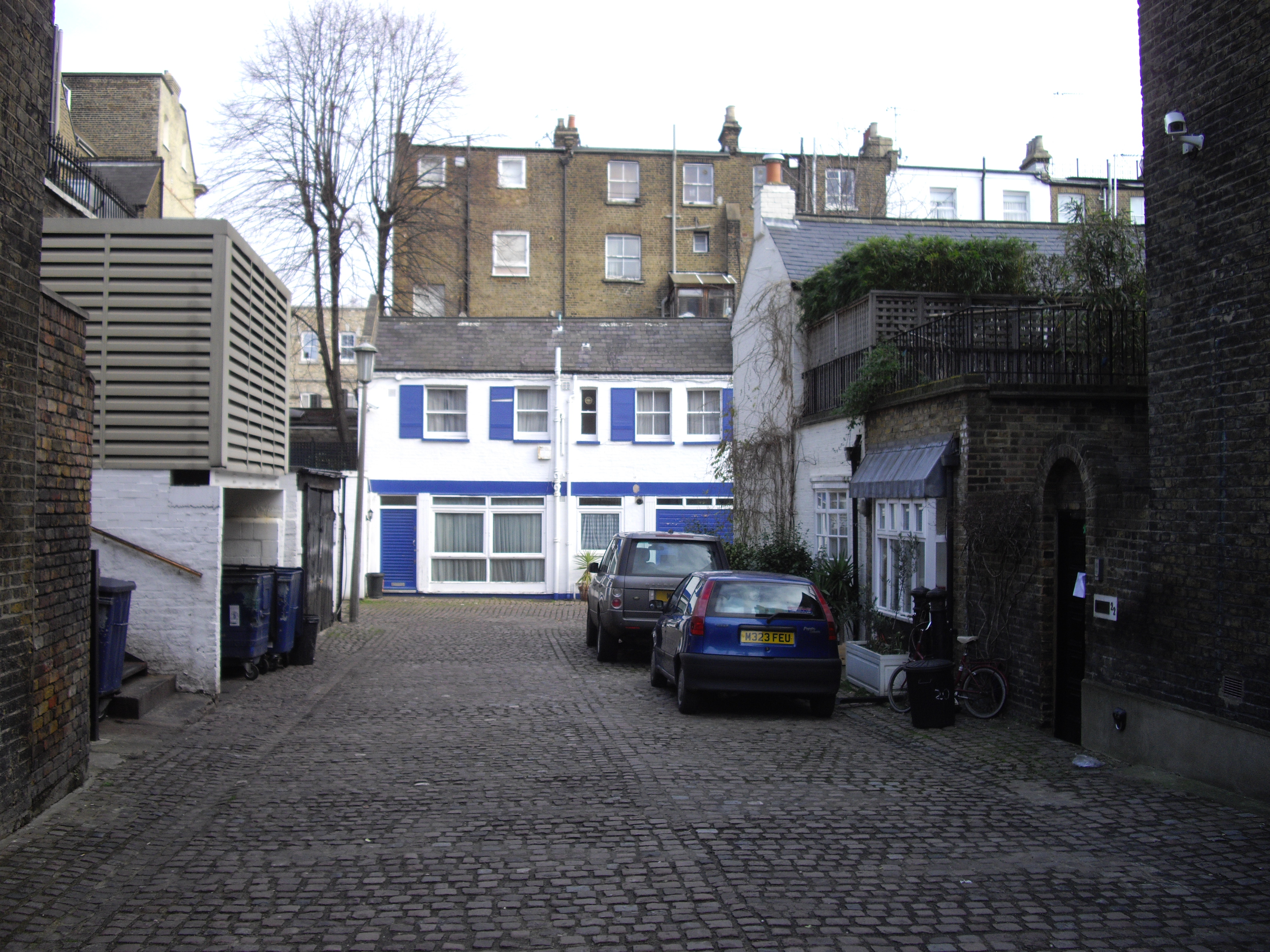
The site of Bamford & Martin in London SW3

== Career ==
=== Aston Martin ===
Bamford & Martin Ltd was founded at 16 Henniker Place in West Kensington (off Fulham Road – the A308) on 15 January 1913. They produced their first Aston-Martin car, the Coal Scuttle, in March 1915. Robert Bamford was the engineer of the partnership. In 1920 he retired from Bamford & Martin; Lionel Martin left in 1926. In the mid-1920s the company would undergo many changes of ownership. It would be largely through the ownership of David Brown Ltd. of Huddersfield that Aston-Martin would become the company renowned during the 1950s, who bought Aston-Martin for £20,500 (£694,000 current value) in 1947.

He was inducted into the Automotive Hall of Fame in 2013.

== Personal life ==
In 1911 he was living at 41 Twickenham Road in Teddington.

He contracted flu in January 1919, and subsequently married his nurse, Matilda Etches, who was in the Queen Mary's Army Auxiliary Corps (WAAC). She was the eldest daughter of C.T.W. Etches, a Captain in the King's Own Yorkshire Light Infantry. They were married in Newton Abbot in Devon.

He injured his jaw cycling down Dundrum Hill on 8 November 1919.

They had a daughter, Patricia, born in Brentford in Middlesex in 1921, and she married the illustrator Robin Jacques in 1943.

Bamford and his wife divorced in 1927. On Monday 24 April 1950 she remarried at St Peter's Church, Eaton Square by Prebendary P.T.R. Kirk, and moved from 9 Buckingham Palace Gardens to Los Angeles. The reception was held at her house. Her second husband was a professor at the University of California. She died in 1974.

By 1939, Bamford had retired to South Street, Ditchling, East Sussex. He died on 16 April 1942, aged 59, at the Royal Sussex County Hospital. He was buried at St Margaret's, Ditchling. His headstone reads: 'Motor Engineer Founder of Bamford & Martin later to become Aston Martin. Also his mother Blanche Edith Myers 26 May 1856–5 Mar 1946 [Around the edge] The clocks, folk and pubs of Ditchling will miss him.'
