= Paul Homan =

American economist (1893–1969)

- Born: Paul Thomas Homan; 1893; Indianola, Iowa, U.S.
- Died: 1969 (aged 75–76)
- Education: Willamette College; University of Oxford; Brookings Institution
- Occupation: Economist
- Employer(s): Washington University in St. Louis; University of California, Berkeley; Cornell University
- Spouse: Matilda Etches (m. 1950)

Paul Thomas Homan (1893–1969) was an American economist. He was a professor of economics at Cornell University from 1929 to 1947.

== Early life ==
Homan was born in Indianola, Iowa.

Homan earned bachelor's degrees from Willamette College, and with a Rhodes Scholarship, the University of Oxford, graduating in 1919. He earned a PhD at the Brookings Institution in 1926.

== Career ==
Homan was instructor in economics at Washington University in St. Louis (1923–1925), Assistant Professor of Economics at the University of California, Berkeley (1926–1927), Assistant Professor of Economics (1927–1929) and Professor (1929–1947) at Cornell University.

From 1941 to 1952, he was managing editor of the American Economic Review.

His papers are held at the University of Sussex, England, and were donated in 1969 by his wife, Matilda Etches Homan.

== Publications ==
- Contemporary economic thought (1928)

== Personal life ==
In 1950, he married British fashion designer Matilda Etches, her second marriage.
