= The Stolen Lake =

1981 novel by Joan Aiken

- First edition
- Author: Joan Aiken
- Illustrator: Pat Marriot
- Language: English
- Genre: Alternate history, children's novel
- Publisher: Jonathan Cape
- Publication date: 1981
- Publication place: United Kingdom
- Media type: Print (Hardback & paperback)
- Pages: 272
- ISBN: 0-224-01924-4
- Preceded by: Nightbirds on Nantucket
- Followed by: The Cuckoo Tree

The Stolen Lake is a 1981 children's novel by Joan Aiken. Taking place in an alternate history, the story follows the adventures of Dido Twite in a fictionalized version of South America.

The novel is, according to the internal chronology of the novels, the fourth in the Wolves Chronicles, a collection of books set during the fictional 19th-century reign of King James III. In this world, part of South America is inhabited by Ancient British (Celtic) colonists following an invasion that occurred hundreds of years prior.

== Plot ==
After her adventures in Nightbirds on Nantucket, Dido Twite is travelling back to England on the naval vessel HMS Thrush. En route, she befriends the ship's open-minded steward, Holystone. The ship changes course, landing on the coast of New Cumbria. Bound by ancient treaties between Britain and New Cumbria, they are given orders to assist Ginevra, the Queen. Travelling to Bath, the capital city, the crew learn that Ginevra wants them to help her recover a lake, which she claims has been stolen by New Cumbria's neighbour, Lyonesse. It seems that she is the same immortal Ginevra, or Guinevere, of myth and has waited centuries for the return of her king, Arthur. Unfortunately, she has attained immortality by cannibalistic vampirism, murdering and consuming local maidens. It then transpires that Holystone is an incarnation of Arthur, who for a thousand years had lain in suspended animation on an island in the missing lake. But this Arthur is not at all pleased at the monstrosity his ancient spouse has become.

== Characters ==
- Dido Twite, the protagonist of the novel
- Captain Hughes, the captain of the H. M. S. Thrush, which brought Dido Twite to Roman America from Nantucket
- Queen Ginevra, the "White Queen" of New Cumbria
- Holystone, the steward of the Thrush; later discovered to be Ginevra's Rex Quondam
- Elen, a princess of Lyonesse, rescued by Dido Twite
