= Nugent Barker =

Irish writer

Nugent Barker (1888–1955) was an Irish writer. Little is known about him, but he is thought to have come from an old Irish family, the Nugents of County Westmeath. He is remembered for the evocative ghost story "Whessoe", and the grimly humorous "Curious Adventure of Mr Bond". Barker studied at Cheltenham College, where one of his classmates was Herman Cyril McNeile, who later wrote thrillers under the pseudonym "Sapper".

== Stories and ratings ==
Although rated highly by contemporaries – Edward Joseph Harrington O'Brien's The Best British Stories of 1929, is dedicated to him – little is known of his life. The twenty-one tales in Written With My Left Hand, first collected in 1950, are thought to represent his total of literary output.

The reprint of "Whessoe" in the Best British Short Stories of 1929 contains the only biographical note extant. It stated that he was educated at Cheltenham College and began his career as a black–and–white artist. When in 1914 the doctors failed to pass him into the army on account of his eyes, he devoted himself entirely to literature. The note added that he lived in London.

Barker indeed lived at 16 Tite Street, Chelsea in the late 1920s, a house previously occupied by Oscar Wilde. Barker lived there until his death in 1955.

Richard Dalby has described Barker as the author of "many excellent short stories". Douglas A. Anderson opined in a Foreword to a later edition of Written With My Left Hand that Barker ranks alongside fellow 20th-century exponents of the strange story, Walter de la Mare and John Metcalfe.

== Bibliography ==
- Written With My Left Hand, Percival Marshall & Co. (London), 1951. Ditto, Tartarus Press, 2002
