= John Rowe Townsend =

British children's writer and literary critic

John Rowe Townsend (19 May 1922 – 24 March 2014) was a British children's writer and children's literature scholar. His best-known children's novel is The Intruder, which won a 1971 Edgar Award. His best-known academic work is a reference series, Written for Children: An Outline of English Children's Literature (1965), the definitive work of its time on the subject. It was greatly expanded for the first revised edition as Written for Children: An Outline of English-language Children's Literature (1974) and updated for its 2nd to 4th revised editions in 1983, 1987, and 1990 – the last, "A survey of imaginative writing, including poetry and picture books, accompanied by a bibliography of works on children's literature and illustrations from many of the classics of children's literature through 1989." (OCLC 25630220).

== Biography ==
Townsend was born in Leeds and educated at Leeds Grammar School and Emmanuel College, Cambridge. His popular works include Gumble's Yard, his debut novel published in 1961; Widdershins Crescent (1965); and The Intruder (1969), which won the 1971 Edgar Award for Best Juvenile Mystery from the Mystery Writers of America. In Britain, The Intruder was adapted as a children's TV series starring Milton Johns as the stranger. He was for some time editor of The Guardian's weekly international edition, and also served as the paper's children's books editor.

Also in Britain, Noah's Castle was filmed by Southern Television, narrated by character Barry Mortimer (Simon Gipps-Kent), and transmitted in seven 25-minute episodes in 1980.

He had had a relationship with Jill Paton Walsh from the early 1970s, but they were only married after the death of her first husband in 2004.

== Books ==
- Gumble's Yard (1961)
- Hell's Edge (1963)
- Widdershins Crescent (1965)
- Written for Children: An Outline of English Children's Literature (1965)
- The Hallersage Sound (1966)
- Pirate's Island (1968)
- The Intruder (1969)
- Trouble in the Jungle (1969)
- Goodbye to Gumble's Yard (1970)
- A Sense of Story (1971); reissued as A Sounding of Storytellers (1979)
- The Summer People (1972)
- Wish for Wings (1972)
- Good-night, Prof, Love (1973)
- Written for Children: An Outline of English-language Children's Literature (1974) – first revised edition of the 1965 Outline
- Forest of the Night (1974)
- Noah's Castle (1975)
- Top of the World (1976)
- The Xanadu Manuscript (1977) (US title: The Visitors)
- Runaways (1979)
- A Sounding of Storytellers (1979)
- King Creature, Come (1980) (US title: The Creatures)
- The Fortunate Isles (1981); reissued as The Golden Journey (1989)
- The Islanders (1981)
- A Foreign Affair (1982) (US title: Kate and the Revolution)
- Clever Dick: The Diary of a Dreadful Child (1982)
- Dan Alone (1983)
- Cloudy-Bright (1984); reissued as Sam and Jenny (1992)
- Fame and Fortune (1984)
- Gone to the Dogs (1984)
- Tom Tiddler's Ground (1985); reissued as The Hidden Treasure (1988)
- The Persuading Stick (1986)
- Downstream (1987)
- Rob's Place (1987)
- Cranford Revisited (1989)
- Cheer and Groan (1989)
- The Invaders (1992) – sequel to The Islanders
