= One Came Home =

2013 children's book by Amy Timberlake

First edition

One Came Home is a children's historical novel set in Wisconsin during 1871. It was written by Amy Timberlake and published by Knopf in 2013. One Came Home is a winner of the Edgar Award for Best Juvenile Mystery and a Newbery Honor award in 2014. This book was published by Random House Children's Books on January 7, 2014. Along with the Edgar Award and a Newbery Honor, One Came Home, was named best book of the year by the Washington Post, Kirkus Reviews, Bookpage, Bank Street, and National Public Radio. It was also a part of the Scholastic Book Club selection.

== Plot summary ==
Georgie Burkhardt is a plain-speaking, gun-toting girl in 1871 Wisconsin. She is convinced that her older sister, whom everyone in town believes is dead, is still alive and sets off to the western frontier to find her.

== Reception ==
A reviewer for Common Sense Media hailed the protagonist's voice as “distinctive and likable”, but also warned that the “slow pace might deter some readers”.

== Awards ==
One Came Home received the following accolades:

- 2015 Pennsylvania Young Readers' Choice Award Nominee for Grades 6-8
- 2014 Judy Lopez Memorial Award for Children's Literature Nominee
- 2014 Society of Midland Authors Award for Children's Fiction
- 2014 John Newbery Medal Honor Book
- 2014 Edgar Award for Best Juvenile Mystery
