= Footer Davis Probably Is Crazy =

2015 book by Susan Vaught

- Author: Susan Vaught
- Genre: Realistic fiction, Children's books, Young adult
- Published: 2015
- Publisher: Simon & Schuster
- Pages: 240
- Awards: Edgar Award for Best Juvenile (2016)
- ISBN: 978-1-481-42276-5
- Website: Footer Davis Probably Is Crazy

Footer Davis Probably Is Crazy is a children's novel written by American author Susan Vaught and published by Simon & Schuster on March 3, 2015. It later went on to win the Edgar Award for Best Juvenile in 2016.

== Plot summary ==
This contemporary novel is set in Bugtussle, Mississippi, in the Southern United States. The narrator, 11-year-old Footer Davis, has to deal with her mother's bipolar disorder while trying to find out what happened to the Abrams children after their barn burned down. It troubles her that she seems to be having hallucinations – but they may be repressed memories. Footer is on the mission to do almost everything to help his friends, family, and herself.
