= Black Hearts in Battersea =

1964 novel by Joan Aiken

- First edition (US)
- Author: Joan Aiken
- Illustrator: Pat Marriott (UK); Robin Jacques & others (US)
- Language: English
- Series: Wolves Chronicles
- Genre: Children's novel
- Publisher: Doubleday (US); Jonathan Cape (UK)
- Publication date: 1964 (US); 1965 (UK)
- Publication place: United Kingdom
- Media type: Print (Hardback & Paperback)
- Preceded by: The Wolves of Willoughby Chase
- Followed by: Nightbirds on Nantucket

Black Hearts in Battersea is a children's novel by Joan Aiken first published in 1964. The second book in the Wolves Chronicles, it is loosely a sequel to her earlier The Wolves of Willoughby Chase. The book is set in a slightly altered historical England—during the reign of King James III—in the early 19th century, and follows the adventures of Simon, an orphan whose plans to study painting in London are derailed by high adventure. Aiken was inspired to create an atmosphere of important events having already transpired offstage (which was helped by the fact that a great deal of the beginning had to be left out due to length), and also included an involved "Dickensian plot" which she believed to complement the habit many children have of rereading or having a book reread to them.

== TV adaptation ==
In 1995, the book was adapted into a television series by James Andrew Hall, airing on BBC1 from 31 December 1995 to 11 February 1996.

=== Cast list ===
- Mark Burdis as Scrimshaw
- Jade Williams as Dido
- Roger Bizley as Captain Dark
- Annette Badland as Dolly Buckle
- John Altman as Midwink
- Gemma Sealey as Sophie
- William Mannering as Simon
- Richard Woods as Boy with Wheelbarrow

== Radio adaptation ==
A BBC Radio dramatisation by Lin Coghlan, directed by Marc Beeby, featured Joe Dempsie as Simon, Nicola Miles-Wilden as Dido, and Emerald O'Hanrahan as Sophie.

Part One: Young Simon comes to 18th-century London to study painting - and finds himself caught up in wicked Hanoverian plots to overthrow the King.

Broadcasts: BBC Radio 4, 14:15 Wed 23 Dec.2009. 14:15 Wed 21 Dec.2011.

Part Two: To save the King from Hanoverian plotters Simon and Sophie must first suffer shipwreck, attacks by wolves and a narrow escape from an exploding castle, in a hot-air balloon.

Broadcasts: BBC Radio 4, 14:15, Thu 24 Dec.2009. 14:15, Thu 22 Dec.2011.

=== Cast list ===
- SIMON ..... Joe Dempsie
- DIDO ..... Nicola Miles-Wildin
- SOPHIE ..... Emerald O'Hanrahan
- DUKE ..... John Rowe
- DUCHESS ..... Sheila Reid
- COBBE ..... Ben Crowe
- MRS COBBE ..... Annabelle Dowler
- MR TWITE ..... Rhys Jennings
- MRS TWITE ..... Tessa Nicholson
- JUSTIN ..... Sam Pamphilon
- BUCKLE ..... Nigel Hastings
- MRS BUCKLE ..... Kate Layden
- DR FURNEAUX ..... Bruce Alexander
- DR FIELD ..... Ewan Hooper
- MOGG ..... John Biggins
- GUS ..... Joseph Cohen Cole
- JABWING ..... Piers Wehner
- WOMAN ..... Kate Layden
