= Amy Timberlake =

Author children's book author

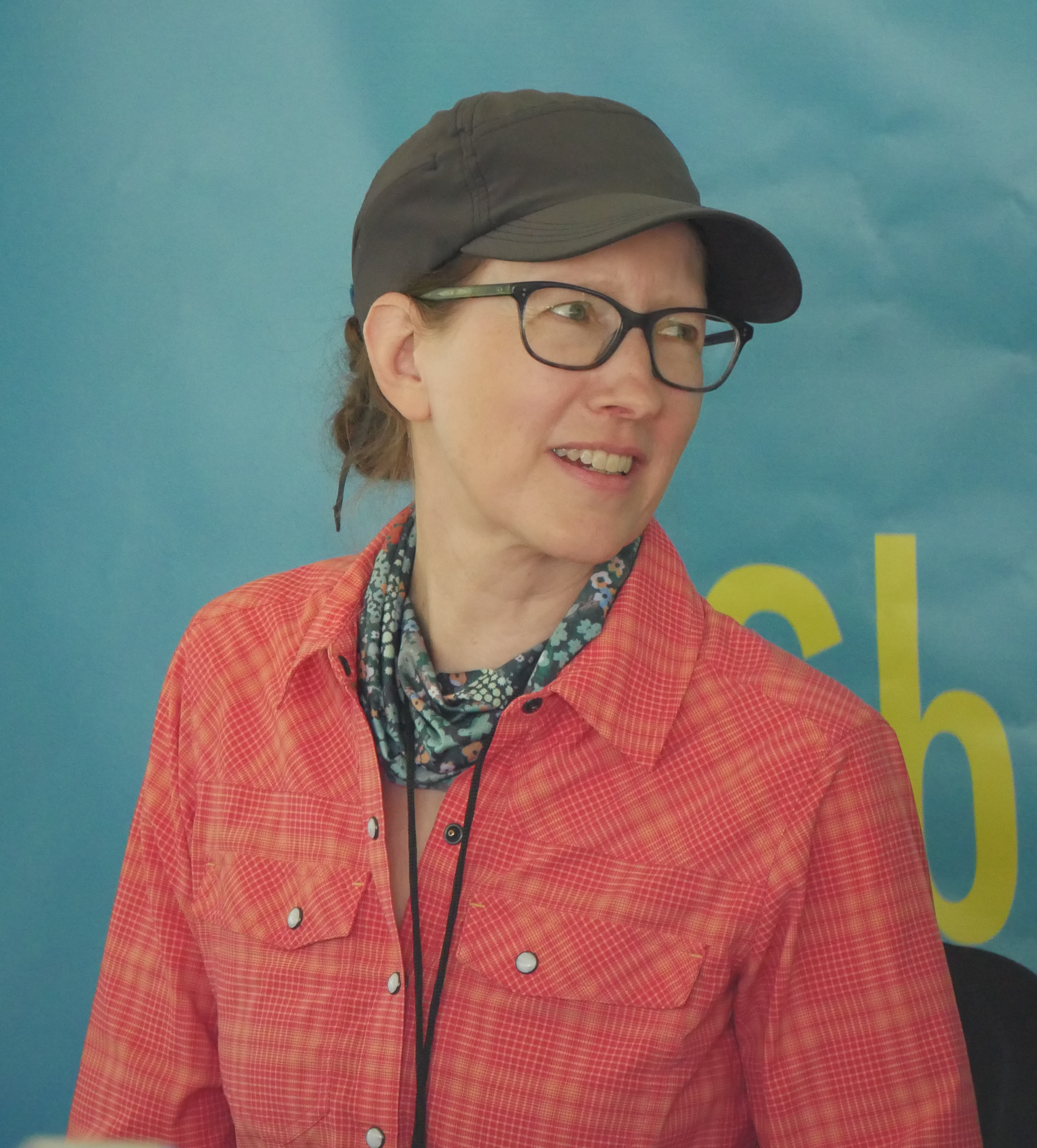
reading at the 2025 Gaithersburg Book Festival

Amy Timberlake is an American author of five children's books: One Came Home, That Girl Lucy Moon, The Dirty Cowboy, Skunk and Badger and Egg Marks the Spot. One Came Home was awarded the Newbery Honor and the Edgar Award. That Girl Lucy Moon was awarded by the Friends of American Writer's Literacy, and The Dirty Cowboy has received a Parent's Choice Gold Medal and won the 2004 Golden Kite Award.

Timberlake grew up in the small town of Hudson, Wisconsin, but later adapted to city life when she moved to Chicago, Illinois and married.

== Bibliography ==
=== Skunk and Badger Series ===
Skunk and Badger was published on September 15, 2020 by Algonquin Young Readers and has received the following accolades:

- People Best Book for Kids of 2020
- Kirkus Reviews Best Children’s Book of 2020
- Booklist Editor’s Choice Book of 2020
- School Library Journal Best Book of 2020
- Publishers Weekly Best Book of 2020
- Shelf Awareness for Readers Best Book of 2020
- New York Public Library Best Book of 2020
- Chicago Public Library Best Book of 2020
- Indigo Best Book of the Year 2020
- Evanston Public Library Great Kids Book of 2020
- Sid Fleischman Award for Humor nominee (2020)

Skunk and Badger's sequel, Egg Marks the Spot, was published on September 14, 2021 by Algonquin Books.

=== One Came Home (2013) ===
One Came Home was published on January 1, 2013 by Knopf Books for Young Readers and has received the following accolades:

- 2015 Pennsylvania Young Readers' Choice Award Nominee for Grades 6-8
- 2014 Judy Lopez Memorial Award for Children's Literature Nominee
- 2014 Society of Midland Authors Award for Children's Fiction
- 2014 John Newbery Medal Honor Book
- 2014 Edgar Award for Best Juvenile Mystery

=== That Girl Lucy Moon (2006) ===
That Girl Lucy Moon was published on September 1, 2006 by Disney-Hyperion.

=== The Dirty Cowboy (2003) ===
The Dirty Cowboy was published on August 8, 2003 by Farrar, Straus, and Giroux. It received the Golden Kite Award for Picture Book Text in 2004.
