= The Intruder (Townsend novel) =

1969 children's novel by John Rowe Townsend

- Author: John Rowe Townsend
- Genre: Children's Novel
- Publisher: OUP
- Publication date: 1969

The Intruder is a 1969 children's novel by John Rowe Townsend. It was well-received, being shortlisted for the Carnegie Medal and winning the Horn Book Award in 1970 and the Edgar Award in 1971. The book was adapted for television in 1971.

== Plot summary ==
Sixteen-year-old Arnold Haithwaite is a sand pilot guiding parties of tourists over the sands at Skirlston; a fictional seaside town in England. But Arnold's quiet life is shattered when a stranger turns up claiming to be the real Arnold Haithwaite. Life at Cottontree House changes dramatically for the young lad and his father when the stranger worms his way into their lives. No one seems to have any sympathy for Arnold's predicament, except newcomers Peter and Jane, and even they are not sure he is not simply imagining the whole thing. Things come to a head when Arnold finds himself fighting the sea itself in the midst of a raging storm, with the stranger at his heels and Jane trapped by the rising tide in the ruins of an old church.

== Television adaptation ==
The book was adapted into a British television series, The Intruder, by Granada Television in 1971, broadcast 1972. It starred James Bate (as Arnold), Milton Johns and Sheila Ruskin. There were eight episodes.
