= Dovey Coe =

2000 book by Frances O'Roark Dowell

- Author: Frances O'Roark Dowell
- Language: English
- Genre: Children's Literature
- Published: 2000; Atheneum Books for Young Readers
- Publication place: United States of America
- Pages: 208
- Awards: Edgar Award; The William Allan White Award

Dovey Coe is a children's historical novel by Frances O'Roark Dowell, published in 2000. Set in 1920s North Carolina, it is a first-person narrative from the viewpoint of a mountain girl who wants to clear up confusion about a recent murder. The book went on to win the 2001 Edgar Award.

== Plot ==
12-year-old Dovey Coe narrates the story trying to "lay the record straight" about her sister's suitor's death. The first two-thirds of the book recount the relationship between Dovey's sister, Caroline, and her suitor, Parnell. She offers her own viewpoint about each character including Dovey's parents and her brother, Amos, who is deaf. The last third of the novel is centered in the courtroom as the murder trial takes place.

== Awards ==
- 2001: Edgar Award, Best Children's
- 2003: William Allen White Children's Book Award
