= Shawn Thomas Odyssey =

American novelist

- Born: Bakersfield, California, U.S.
- Occupations: Author; composer
- Agent(s): Catherine Drayton, Inkwell Management
- Known for: The Wizard of Dark Street, The Magician's Tower, Deadwood, Kung Fu Panda (video game)
- Awards: Edgar Award nomination, Agatha Award nomination
- Website: http://www.shawnthomasodyssey.com

Shawn Thomas Odyssey is an Edgar and Agatha Award-nominated author as well as a film, television, and video game music composer. His Wizard of Dark Street (Oona Crate Mystery) series chronicles the adventures of twelve-year-old magical detective Oona Crate and her enchanted raven Deacon as they solve mysteries in the alternate world of Dark Street. He is also known for co-composing the music for Deadwood on HBO, and as the composer for the video game Kung Fu Panda.

== Biography ==
Odyssey began playing guitar and piano at age thirteen. Two years later he wrote his first novel. At nineteen he moved from his home town of Bakersfield, California to Santa Barbara, California. There he joined the Ensemble Theatre Company, a professional theatre company where he worked as an actor, artistic director's assistant, sound designer, and composer.

In 2000 Odyssey began working with film music composers Reinhold Heil, Johnny Klimek, and Bruce Winter, to create the soundtracks for films such as Blood & Chocolate (2007), Land of the Dead (2005), The Cave (2005), Sophie Scholl: The Final Days (2005), Iron Jawed Angels (HBO) (2004), as well as the score for Deadwood (HBO) (2006), and Without A Trace (CBS) (2002). He also worked at Hans Zimmer‘s Remote Control Productions studio with composer Heitor Pereira on the soundtrack for Dirty Dancing: Havana Nights.

In 2008 Odyssey scored the music for the DreamWorks/Activision video game Kung Fu Panda.

In 2011 Odyssey published his first middle-grade/young-adult novel, The Wizard of Dark Street: an Oona Crate Mystery (Egmont USA, 2011). The book was a top 20 ABC New Voices selection from the American Booksellers Association and was subsequently nominated for both an Edgar Award and an Agatha Award.

His second published novel, The Magician's Tower (a sequel to The Wizard of Dark Street), was published in February 2013.

The Magician's Dream, the third book in the Oona Crate Mystery series, had been scheduled for release on June 23, 2015, by Egmont USA. However, since Egmont's American publishing division shut down in January 2015, The Magician's Dream was first published on July 14, 2015, as an ebook with Amazon.

== Novels ==
| Title | Publisher | Year |
|---|---|---|
| The Wizard of Dark Street (an Oona Crate Mystery) | Egmont USA | 2011 |
| The Magician's Tower | Egmont USA | 2013 |
| The Magician's Dream | Amazon | 2015 |

== Music credits ==
| Project | Studio | Notes |
|---|---|---|
| Kung Fu Panda (video game) | DreamWorks/Activision | |
| Perfume: The Story of a Murderer | DreamWorks** | |
| Deadwood | HBO | Co-composer |
| Land of the Dead | Universal Pictures* | |
| Blood and Chocolate | Lakeshore Entertainment* | |
| The Cave | Lakeshore Entertainment* | |
| Sophie Scholl | Goldkind Film* | |
| Deck Dogz | United International Pictures* | |
| Dirty Dancing: Havana Nights | Lakeshore Entertainment** | |
| Dornröschens leiser Tod | GMB* | |
| Wild Card | Lifetime** | |
| La Isla | Independent | |
| True | X-Filme** | |
| Iron Jawed Angels | HBO* | |
| The Matrix Revolutions | Warner Brothers** | Programming for additional music |
| Swimming Upstream | MGM** | |

* Additional score
** Music programming and instrumentation
