= The Quick Fix (novel) =

2012 children's novel by Jack D. Ferraiolo

- Author: Jack D. Ferraiolo
- Genre: Young adult, Humour, Mystery
- Published: 2012
- Publisher: Harry N. Abrams Inc.
- Pages: 304
- Awards: Edgar Award for Best Juvenile (2013)
- ISBN: 978-0-810-99725-7
- Preceded by: The Big Splash
- Website: The Quick Fix

The Quick Fix is a humorous mystery novel for children by American author Jack D. Ferraiolo. It was published by Harry N. Abrams Inc. (now Abrams Books) on 1 May 2012 and received the Edgar Award for Best Juvenile in 2013.

== Plot summary ==
Junior high detective Matt Stevens, who made his debut in The Big Splash, investigates the blackmailing of the star of the school basketball team.
