= List of dystopian literature =

This is a list of notable works of dystopian literature. A dystopia is an unpleasant (typically repressive) society, often propagandized as being utopian. The Encyclopedia of Science Fiction states that dystopian works depict a negative view of "the way the world is supposedly going in order to provide urgent propaganda for a change in direction."

== 18th century ==
- Gulliver's Travels (1726) by Jonathan Swift

== 19th century ==
- The Last Man (1826) by Mary Shelley
- A Sojourn in the City of Amalgamation (1835) by Oliver Bolokitten
- The Tragedy of Man (1862) by Imre Madách
- Notes from Underground (1864) by Fyodor Dostoevsky
- The History of a Town (1870) by Mikhail Saltykov-Shchedrin
- Vril, the Power of the Coming Race (1871) by Edward Bulwer-Lytton, originally printed as The Coming Race
- Erewhon (1872) by Samuel Butler
- The Begum's Fortune (1879) by Jules Verne
- The Fixed Period (1882) by Anthony Trollope
- The Republic of the Future (1887) by Anna Bowman Dodd
- The Inner House (1888) by Walter Besant
- A Strange Manuscript Found in a Copper Cylinder (1888) by James De Mille
- Caesar's Column (1890) by Ignatius L. Donnelly
- Pictures of the Socialistic Future (1891) by Eugen Richter
- "The Repairer of Reputations" (1895) by Robert W. Chambers
- The Time Machine (1895) by H. G. Wells
- When The Sleeper Wakes (1899) by H. G. Wells

== 20th century ==
=== 1900s ===
- The First Men in the Moon (1901) by H. G. Wells
- The Purple Cloud (1901) by M. P. Shiel
- The Iron Heel (1908) by Jack London
- Lord of the World (1908) by Robert Hugh Benson
- The Machine Stops (1909) by E. M. Forster
- The Lunar Trilogy (1911) by Jerzy Żuławski

=== 1910s ===
- The Night Land (1912) by William Hope Hodgson
- When William Came (1913) by Saki as a future history, this is among the earliest of Pax Germanica genre
- Meccania (1918) by "Owen Gregory"(pseudonym)
- The Heads of Cerberus (1919) by "Francis Stevens" (Gertrude Barrows Bennett)

=== 1920s ===
- R.U.R.: Rossum's Universal Robots (1921) by Karel Čapek
- We (1921) by Yevgeny Zamyatin
- Love in the Fog of the Future (1923 or 1924) by Andrei Marsov
- Miasto światłości (1924) by Mieczysław Smolarski
- The Trial (written in 1914 but first published in 1925) by Franz Kafka
- O Presidente Negro (1926) by Monteiro Lobato

=== 1930s ===
- The Foundation Pit (1930) by Andrei Platonov
- Brave New World (1932) by Aldous Huxley
- Cat Country (1932/1933) by Lao She
- It Can't Happen Here (1935) by Sinclair Lewis
- War with the Newts (1936) by Karel Čapek
- Swastika Night (1937) by Katharine Burdekin
- Anthem (1938) by Ayn Rand
- Invitation to a Beheading (1938) by Vladimir Nabokov

=== 1940s ===
- Darkness at Noon (1940) by Arthur Koestler
- "If This Goes On—" (1940) by Robert A. Heinlein
- Kallocain (1940) by Karin Boye
- The Moon Is Down (1942) by John Steinbeck
- That Hideous Strength (1945) by C. S. Lewis
- Peace In Our Time (1946) by Noël Coward
- Bend Sinister (1947) by Vladimir Nabokov
- Ape and Essence (1948) by Aldous Huxley
- Some Time Never: A Fable for Supermen (1948) by Roald Dahl
- The World of Null-A (1948) by A. E. van Vogt
- Heliopolis (1949) by Ernst Jünger
- Nineteen Eighty-Four (1949) by George Orwell

=== 1950s ===
- Player Piano (1952) by Kurt Vonnegut
- The Sound of His Horn (1952) by Sarban
- Fahrenheit 451 (1953) by Ray Bradbury
- Love Among the Ruins (1953) by Evelyn Waugh
- One (1953) by David Karp
- The Space Merchants (1953) by Frederik Pohl and C. M. Kornbluth
- The Caves of Steel (1954) by Isaac Asimov
- Lord of the Flies (1954) by William Golding
- The Chrysalids (1955) by John Wyndham
- The City and the Stars (1956) by Arthur C. Clarke
- Minority Report (1956) by Philip K. Dick
- The World Jones Made (1956) by Philip K. Dick
- Atlas Shrugged (1957) by Ayn Rand
- The Naked Sun (1957) by Isaac Asimov
- The Rise of the Meritocracy (1958) by Michael Young, Baron Young of Dartington
- Alas, Babylon (1959) by Pat Frank
- A Canticle for Leibowitz (1959) by Walter M. Miller Jr.
- The John Franklin Letters (1959) by anonymous (probably Revilo P. Oliver)

=== 1960s ===
- Dr. Futurity (1960) by Philip K. Dick
- Facial Justice (1960) by L. P. Hartley
- Vulcan's Hammer (1960) by Philip K. Dick
- "Harrison Bergeron" (1961) by Kurt Vonnegut
- Powrót z gwiazd (1961) by Stanisław Lem
- The Old Men at the Zoo (1961) by Angus Wilson
- A Clockwork Orange (1962) by Anthony Burgess
- The Man in the High Castle (1962) by Philip K. Dick
- The Wanting Seed (1962) by Anthony Burgess
- The Game-Players of Titan (1963) by Philip K. Dick
- Planet of the Apes (1963) by Pierre Boulle
- Farnham's Freehold (1964) by Robert A. Heinlein
- Nova Express (1964) by William S. Burroughs
- The Penultimate Truth (1964) by Philip K. Dick
- The Three Stigmata of Palmer Eldritch (1964) by Philip K. Dick
- "Repent, Harlequin!" Said the Ticktockman (1965) by Harlan Ellison
- The Crack in Space (1966) by Philip K. Dick
- The Dream Master (1966) by Roger Zelazny
- Make Room! Make Room! (1966) by Harry Harrison
- Now Wait for Last Year (1966) by Philip K. Dick
- Snail on the Slope (1966) by Arkady and Boris Strugatsky
- "I Have No Mouth, and I Must Scream" by Harlan Ellison (1967) (post-apocalyptic with elements of dystopia)
- Logan's Run (1967) by William F. Nolan and George Clayton Johnson
- The Time Hoppers (1967) by Robert Silverberg
- The White Mountains (1967) by John Christopher
- Why Call Them Back from Heaven? (1967) by Clifford D. Simak
- A Very Private Life (1968) by Michael Frayn
- Camp Concentration (1968) by Thomas M. Disch
- Do Androids Dream of Electric Sheep? (1968) by Philip K. Dick
- Stand on Zanzibar (1968) by John Brunner
- Synthajoy (1968) by D. G. Compton
- The Jagged Orbit (1969) by John Brunner

=== 1970s ===
- This Perfect Day (1970) by Ira Levin
- The Guardians (1970) by John Christopher
- The Lorax (1971) by Dr. Seuss
- The Lathe of Heaven (1971) by Ursula K. Le Guin
- Los Angeles: AD 2017 (1971) by Phillip Wylie
- The World Inside (1971) by Robert Silverberg
- 334 (1972) by Thomas M. Disch
- The Sheep Look Up (1972) by John Brunner
- The Iron Dream (1972) by Norman Spinrad
- The Camp of the Saints (1973) by Jean Raspail
- The Ultimate Solution by Eric Norden (1973)
- Flow My Tears, the Policeman Said (1974) by Philip K. Dick
- Walk to the End of the World (1974) by Suzy McKee Charnas
- Dhalgren (1975) by Samuel R. Delany
- The Forever War (1975) by Joe Haldeman
- The Girl Who Owned a City (1975) by O. T. Nelson
- High-Rise (1975) by J. G. Ballard
- The Shockwave Rider (1975) by John Brunner
- Don't Bite the Sun (1976) by Tanith Lee
- Woman on the Edge of Time (1976) by Marge Piercy
- The Dark Tower (1977) – unfinished, attributed to C. S. Lewis, published as The Dark Tower and Other Stories
- A Scanner Darkly (1977) by Philip K. Dick
- The Eye of the Heron (1978) by Ursula K. Le Guin
- SS-GB by Len Deighton (1978)
- The Stand (1978) by Stephen King
- 1985 (1978) by Anthony Burgess
- The Turner Diaries (1978) by Andrew Macdonald
- Alongside Night (1979) by J. Neil Schulman
- The Long Walk (1979) by Stephen King under the pseudonym Richard Bachman

=== 1980s ===
- Mockingbird (1980) by Walter Tevis
- Riddley Walker (1980) by Russell Hoban
- Lanark: A Life in Four Books (1981) by Alasdair Gray
- Limes inferior (1982) by Janusz Zajdel
- The Running Man (1982) by Stephen King under the pseudonym Richard Bachman
- HaDerekh LeEin Harod (1984) by Amos Kenan
- Paradyzja (1984) by Janusz Zajdel
- Sprawl trilogy: Neuromancer (1984) by William Gibson
- Count Zero (1986) by William Gibson
- Mona Lisa Overdrive (1988) by William Gibson
- Dayworld (1985) by Philip José Farmer
- The Handmaid's Tale (1985) by Margaret Atwood
- In the Country of Last Things (1985) by Paul Auster
- Moscow 2042 (1986) by Vladimir Voinovich
- Sea of Glass (1986) by Barry B. Longyear
- Obernewtyn Chronicles (1987–2008) by Isobelle Carmody
- The Domination (1988) by S. M. Stirling
- The Proteus Operation (1985) by James P. Hogan
- The Divide (1980) by William Overgard
- To the Stars trilogy (1980) by Harry Harrison

=== 1990s ===
==== Fiction ====
- Clash of Eagles (1990) by Leo Rutman
- The Dark Beyond the Stars (1991) by Frank M. Robinson
- Timewyrm: Exodus (1991) by Terrance Dicks
- Serpent's Walk (1991) by Randolph D. Calverhall
- The War in 2020 (1991) by Ralph Peters
- The Children of Men (1992) by P. D. James
- Fatherland by Robert Harris (1992)
- Snow Crash (1992) by Neal Stephenson
- Parable of the Sower (1993) by Octavia E. Butler
- Virtual Light (1993) by William Gibson
- Vurt (1993) by Jeff Noon
- Paris in the Twentieth Century (written in 1863 but first published in 1994) by Jules Verne
- The Memory Police (1994) by Yōko Ogawa
- The Diamond Age (1994) by Neal Stephenson
- Gun, with Occasional Music (1994) by Jonathan Lethem
- Amnesia Moon (1995) by Jonathan Lethem
- '48 (1996) by James Herbert
- Attentatet i Pålsjö skog (1996) by Hans Alfredson
- Infinite Jest (1996) by David Foster Wallace
- Battle Royale (1999) by Koushun Takami
- Forever Free (1999) by Joe Haldeman
- The Ice People (1999) by Maggie Gee

==== Young adult fiction ====
- The Giver (1993) by Lois Lowry
- Shade's Children (1997) by Garth Nix
- Among the Hidden (Shadow Children #1) (1998) by Margaret Peterson Haddix

== 21st century ==
=== 2000s ===
==== Fiction ====
- Ella Minnow Pea (2001) by Mark Dunn
- Feed (2002) by M. T. Anderson
- In the Presence of Mine Enemies (2003) by Harry Turtledove
- Jennifer Government (2003) by Max Barry
- Oryx and Crake (2003) by Margaret Atwood
- Collaborator (2003) by Murray Davies
- Asphalt (2004) by Carl Hancock Rux
- Cloud Atlas (2004) by David Mitchell
- The Plot Against America (2004) by Philip Roth
- Divided Kingdom (2005) by Rupert Thomson
- Never Let Me Go (2005) by Kazuo Ishiguro
- Armageddon's Children (2006) by Terry Brooks
- The Book of Dave (2006) by Will Self
- Day of the Oprichnik (2006) by Vladimir Sorokin
- Blind Faith (2007) by Ben Elton
- Rant (2007) by Chuck Palahniuk
- Last Light (2007) by Alex Scarrow
- Nontraditional Love (2008) by Rafael Grugman
- World Made by Hand (2008) by James Howard Kunstler
- Farthing, Ha'penny, and Half a Crown, series by Jo Walton (2006–2008)
- The City & the City (2009) by China Miéville
- Shades of Grey (2009) by Jasper Fforde
- The Windup Girl (2009) by Paolo Bacigalupi
- The Year of the Flood (2009) by Margaret Atwood
- Z213: Exit (2009) by Dimitris Lyacos

==== Young adult fiction ====
- Gathering Blue (2000) by Lois Lowry
- Mortal Engines (The Hungry City Chronicles #1) (2001) by Philip Reeve
- Noughts and Crosses (2001) by Malorie Blackman
- The House of the Scorpion (2002) by Nancy Farmer
- Among the Barons (Shadow Children #4) (2003) by Margaret Peterson Haddix
- Among the Betrayed (Shadow Children #3) (2003) by Margaret Peterson Haddix
- The City of Ember (2003) by Jeanne DuPrau
- Among the Brave (Shadow Children #5) (2004) by Margaret Peterson Haddix
- Messenger (2004) by Lois Lowry
- The People of Sparks (2004) by Jeanne DuPrau
- Among the Enemy (Shadow Children #6) (2005) by Margaret Peterson Haddix
- Checkmate (2005) by Malorie Blackman
- Uglies (2005) by Scott Westerfeld
- Pretties (2005) by Scott Westerfeld
- Among the Free (Shadow Children #7) (2006) by Margaret Peterson Haddix
- Genesis (2006) by Bernard Beckett
- Life as We Knew It (2006) by Susan Beth Pfeffer
- Specials (2006) by Scott Westerfeld
- Extras (2007) by Scott Westerfeld
- Incarceron (2007) by Catherine Fisher
- Unwind (2007) by Neal Shusterman
- The Host (2008) by Stephenie Meyer
- The Dead and the Gone (2008) by Susan Beth Pfeffer
- The Declaration (2008) by Gemma Malley
- From the New World (2008) by Yusuke Kishi
- Gone (2008) by Michael Grant
- The Hunger Games (2008) by Suzanne Collins
- The Diamond of Darkhold (2008) by Jeanne DuPrau
- The Resistance (2008) by Gemma Malley
- Sapphique (2007) by Catherine Fisher
- Catching Fire (2009) by Suzanne Collins
- The Forest of Hands and Teeth (2009) by Carrie Ryan
- The Maze Runner (2009) by James Dashner

=== 2010s ===
==== Fiction ====
- The Envy Chronicles (series) (2010) by Joss Ware
- The Passage (2010) by Justin Cronin
- Super Sad True Love Story (2010) by Gary Shteyngart
- Ready Player One (2011) by Ernest Cline
- Shimoneta (2012) by Hirotaka Akagi
- Bleeding Edge (2013) by Thomas Pynchon
- The Bone Season (2013) by Samantha Shannon
- The Circle (2013) by Dave Eggers
- MaddAddam (2013) by Margaret Atwood
- The Office of Mercy (2013) by Ariel Djanikian
- Wool (2013) by Hugh Howey
- Dominion (2014) by C. J. Sansom
- Station Eleven (2014) by Emily St. John Mandel
- The Girl with All the Gifts (2014) by M. R. Carey
- Submission (2015) by Michel Houellebecq
- The Heart Goes Last (2015) by Margaret Atwood
- Friday Black (2018) by Nana Kwame Adjei-Brenyah
- Tears of the Trufflepig (2019) by Fernando A. Flores
- The Testaments (2019) by Margaret Atwood

==== Young adult fiction ====
- Matched (2010) by Ally Condie
- Mockingjay (2010) by Suzanne Collins
- Monsters of Men (2010) by Patrick Ness
- The Scorch Trials (2010) by James Dashner
- Across The Universe (2011) by Beth Revis
- Crossed (2011) by Ally Condie
- The Death Cure (2011) by James Dashner
- Delirium (2011) by Lauren Oliver
- Divergent (2011) by Veronica Roth
- Legend (2011) by Marie Lu
- Shatter Me (2011) by Tahereh Mafi
- The Unwanteds (2011) by Lisa McMann
- Wither (2011) by Lauren DeStefano
- Article 5 (2012) by Kristen Simmons
- Pandemonium (2012) by Lauren Oliver
- Insurgent (2012) by Veronica Roth
- The Selection (2012) by Kiera Cass
- Son (2012) by Lois Lowry
- Reached (2012) by Ally Condie
- Revealing Eden (2012) by Victoria Foyt
- Under the Never Sky (2012) by Veronica Rossi
- Prodigy (2013) by Marie Lu
- The Elite (2013) by Kiera Cass
- The 5th Wave (2013) by Rick Yancey
- Unravel Me (2013) by Tahereh Mafi
- Allegiant (2013) by Veronica Roth
- Champion (2013) by Marie Lu
- Reboot (2013) by Amy Tintera
- The Infinite Sea (2014) by Rick Yancey
- Red Rising (2014) by Pierce Brown
- Golden Son (2015) by Pierce Brown
- Red Queen (novel) (2015) by Victoria Aveyard
- Morning Star (2016) by Pierce Brown
- The Last Star (2016) by Rick Yancey
- Scythe (2016) by Neal Shusterman
- Iron Gold (2018) by Pierce Brown

=== 2020s ===
==== Fiction ====
- Prophet Song (2023) by Paul Lynch
- The Merge (2025) by Grace Walker

==== Young adult fiction ====
- The Ballad of Songbirds and Snakes (2020) by Suzanne Collins
- Sunrise on the Reaping (2025) by Suzanne Collins
- Ready Player Two (2020) by Ernest Cline

== See also ==
- Lists of dystopian works
- Science fiction
- List of utopian literature
