= The Monks of Thelema =

1878 novel by Walter Besant and James Rice

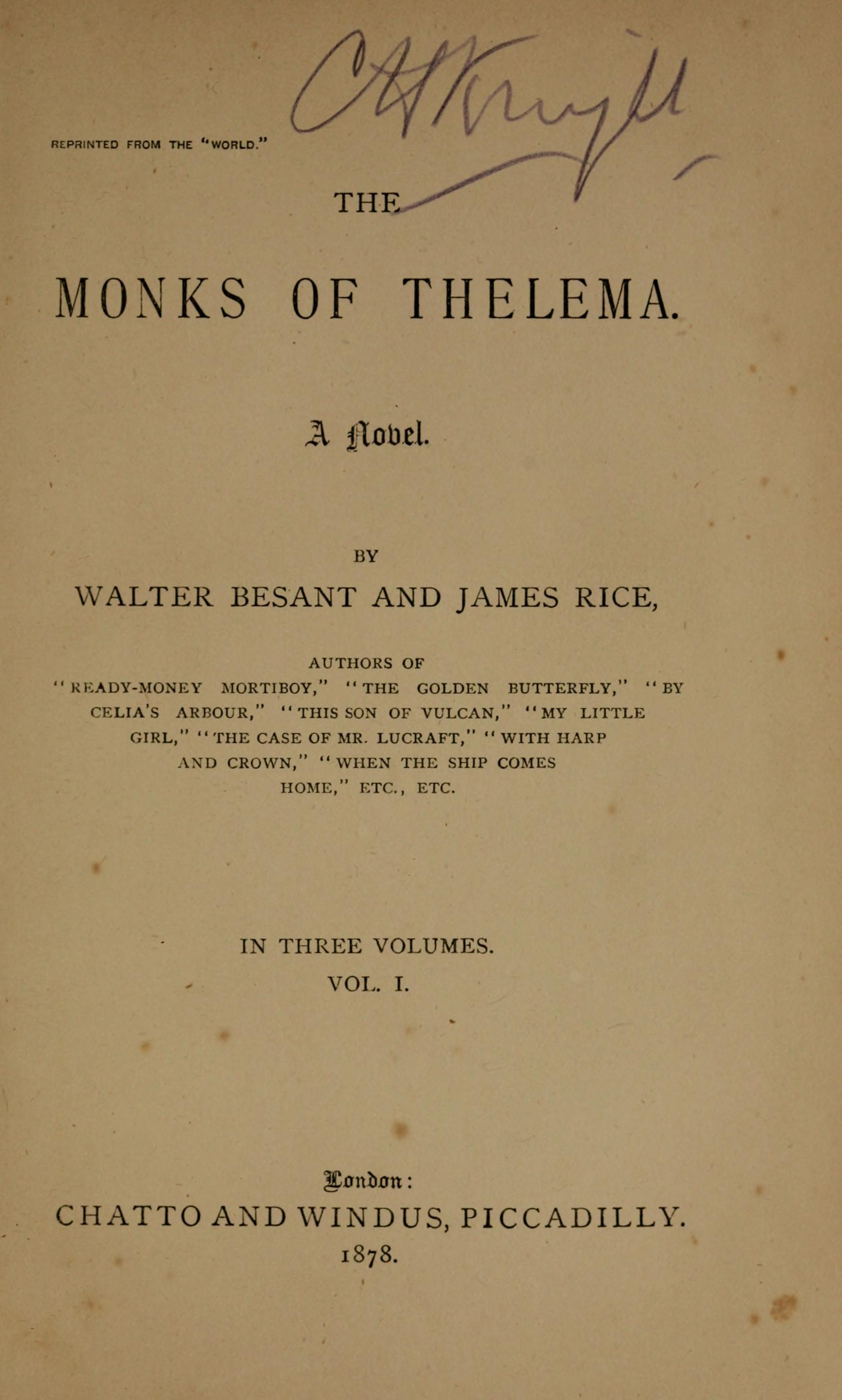
- Title page for The Monks of Thelema (1878)
- Author: Walter Besant, James Rice
- Language: English
- Publisher: Chatto & Windus
- Publication date: 1878
- Publication place: United Kingdom

The Monks of Thelema is a novel by Walter Besant and James Rice. It was published in 1878 by Chatto & Windus, London.

This novel includes descriptions of a sort of "church of Thelema", similar to the Abbey of Thélème, described in Rabelais's Gargantua. Aleister Crowley later founded a religion named Thelema.
