= The Resistance =

The Resistance may refer to a resistance movement. It may also refer to:

== Entertainment ==
=== Books ===
- The Resistance, an Animorphs book
- The Resistance (The Fey), a 1998 novel in the Fey series by Kristine Kathryn Rusch
- The Resistance (Malley novel), a children's novel by Gemma Malley, published in 2008

=== Comics ===
- The Resistance (WildStorm), a WildStorm comic book series
- The Resistance (AWA Studios), an AWA Studios comic book series

=== Films ===
- The Resistance (film), a 2011 Chinese film

=== Music ===
- The Resistance (Swedish band), a Swedish death metal band formed in 2011
- The Resistance (album), a 2009 album by British rock band Muse
- "The Resistance", a song on the studio album New Surrender by the rock band Anberlin
- "The Resistance", a song by Drake
- "The Resistance" a song by American Christian Rock Band, Skillet.

=== Series and Shows ===
- The Resistance (series), an American science fiction series
- The Resistance (Spanish TV), a talk show
- Battlestar Galactica: The Resistance, a series of Battlestar Galactica webisodes
- The Resistance with Keith Olbermann, an online series hosted by Keith Olbermann

== Other ==
- The Resistance (draft evasion movement), a draft evasion movement against the Vietnam War from 1967 to 1969
- The Resistance (hashtag activism), hashtag opposition to the administrations of Donald Trump
- The Resistance (game), a party game of hidden roles

== See also ==
- Resistance (disambiguation)
