= The Fixed Period =

1882 novel by Anthony Trollope

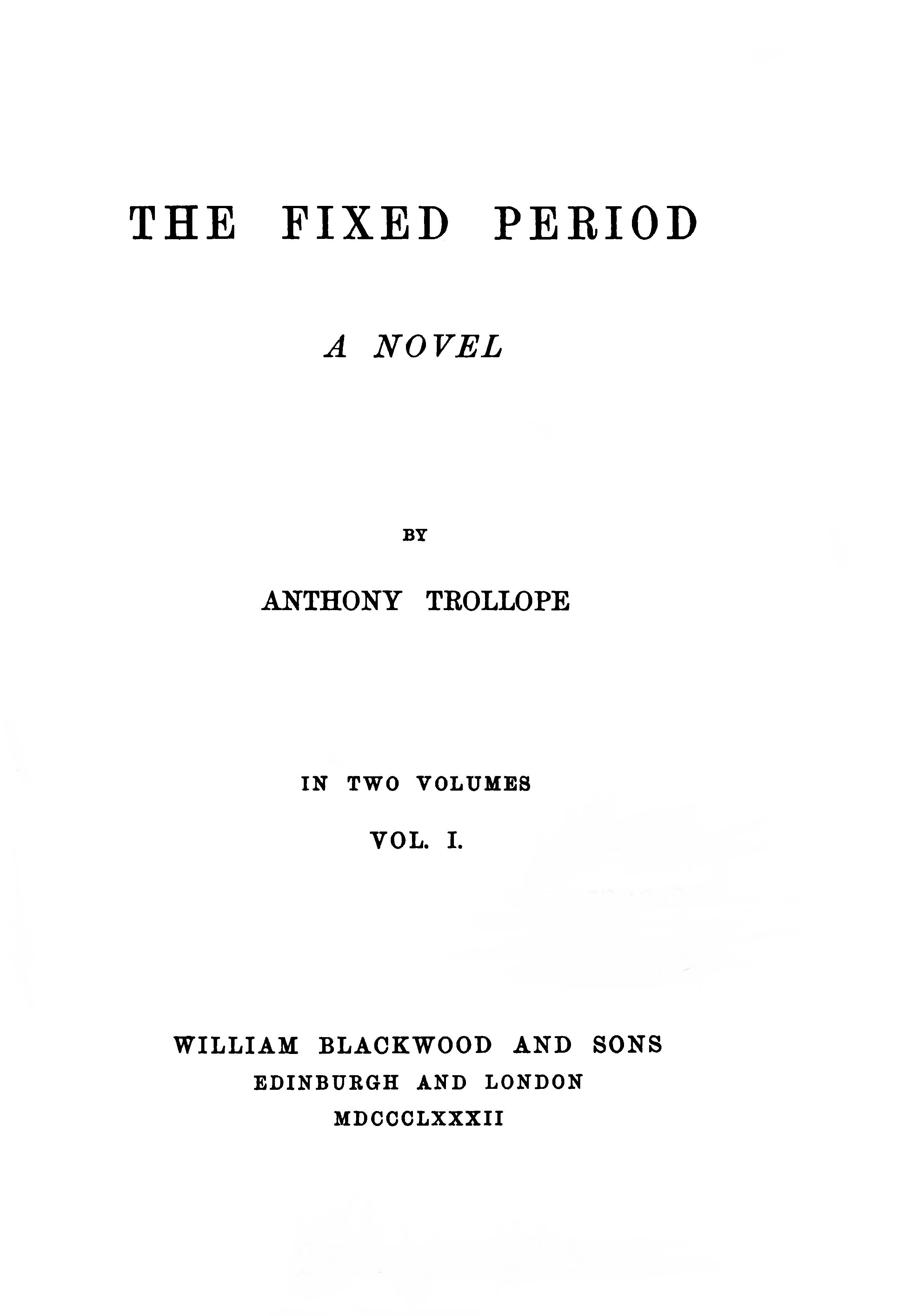
- First edition title page.
- Author: Anthony Trollope
- Language: English
- Genre: Science fiction
- Publisher: Blackwood’s Magazine
- Publication date: October, 1881
- Publication place: United Kingdom

The Fixed Period (1882) is a satirical dystopian novel by Anthony Trollope.

== Introduction ==
It was first published in six instalments in Blackwood's Magazine in 1881–82 and in book form in 1882. In the same year there also appeared US and Tauchnitz editions of the novel. There were no further editions until 1981. The Fixed Period is Trollope's only piece of dystopian writing.

Trollope was influenced in writing the book by The Old Law, a 17th-century tragicomedy written by Thomas Middleton, William Rowley, and Philip Massinger which he had read, and commented upon, in 1876. The Fixed Period is set in the year 1980 in the Republic of Britannula, a fictional island in the vicinity of New Zealand, and deals with euthanasia as a radical solution to the problem of the aged. The novel takes the form of a personal account written by the President of Britannula about the island's recent history. It has frequently been remarked that when the book came out Trollope himself had reached the age of 67, the exact age at which all Britannulans are obliged by law to retire from their worldly affairs and begin a year of preparation for death.

== Life in Britannula and the concept of the "Fixed Period" ==
In Trollope's novel, Britannula is a former British Crown Colony which demanded, and was granted, independence from Great Britain in the mid-20th century. Its 250,000 inhabitants have, with few exceptions, retained British law and customs, and also her currency. Britannula is a thriving agrarian society whose wealth is mainly based on sheep farming and the wool trade. Its capital, Gladstonopolis, is named after 19th century British Liberal statesman and Prime Minister William Ewart Gladstone.

After independence and self-government had been gained, the Britannulans set about to organise their political system. According to the Britannulan Constitution, the Assembly, their unicameral parliament, consists of 85 Senators, who are the elected representatives of the people of Britannula. As there are hardly any differences between social classes, and as there is no aristocracy, the institutionalisation of an upper house was not deemed necessary. Also, as opposed to Great Britain, there is no capital punishment. The Republic of Britannula is headed by an elected president.

The first legislative Assembly of about 30 years ago consisted mainly of young, energetic men who were eager to build a modern state. When a proposal was made to terminate citizens' lives at a fixed age to spare them undignified suffering and to help cut down on the state's expenditure on unproductive people, it got an overwhelming majority. The age was fixed at 67, at which time a citizen's "deposition" was to take place, consisting of their removal to "The College", an institution situated in the town of Necropolis, followed by their "departure", and subsequent cremation, exactly one year later, at the age of 68. No "departures" have been administered so far as none of Britannula's inhabitants has yet reached their "Fixed Period".

The concept of the New Woman has never been known to Britannulans, and there is no feminist movement to speak of. Rather, women still behave and act as if they were living in the Victorian era. They have no role whatsoever in public or business life and lead a quiet and submissive domestic existence. Sex outside marriage is not practised.

== Plot summary ==
Gabriel Crasweller, a successful merchant-farmer and landowner, is Britannula's oldest citizen. Born in 1913, he emigrated from New Zealand when he was a young man and was instrumental in building the new republic as one of a group of similar-minded men which included his best friend John Neverbend, ten years his junior, who is now serving his term as President of Britannula. Whereas decades ago Crasweller also voted in favour of the law which introduced the "Fixed Period", he gradually becomes more pensive as the day of his deposition is approaching. Neverbend has long been planning that day and envisaging it as a day of triumph, believing that mankind and civilisation will move an enormous step forward towards perfection. As the originator of the idea, Neverbend also hopes that his name will go down in the annals of history as one of the great reformers. He considers it unfortunate that his friend Crasweller, as the first one to go, does not show any of the signs of old age for which "the Law" was made in the first place: Crasweller is healthy and vigorous, his mental abilities have not started to deteriorate in any way, and accordingly he is more than capable of managing his own affairs and of earning his living.

When all of a sudden Crasweller starts lying about his age and claiming that he was in fact born a year later, Neverbend realises that measures must be taken to ensure the smooth execution of the Law. However, he soon finds out that it has dawned on other elderly citizens as well what the state has in store for them, and that various individuals have come up with all kinds of excuses and plans as to how they are going to oppose their deposition and, eventually, departure. He finds a supporter in Abraham Grundle, one of the young Senators, but is shocked when he realises that Grundle, who is engaged to Crasweller's daughter Eva, only wants to inherit his friend's fortune as soon as possible. But despite this setback, and although both his own son Jack and his wife Sarah turn against him, Neverbend, who has long since passed the point of no return, considers it his duty as President and law-abiding citizen to have Crasweller deposited.

As a man of honour, Crasweller finally yields to Neverbend's arguments and stoically accepts his fate. However, on the very day of his deposition the carriage that is to transport the two men to the College is held up in the streets of Gladstonopolis by British armed forces. They have arrived on a warship of enormous dimensions and, by threatening to destroy the whole city with their "250-lb swivel gun", compel Neverbend to release Crasweller and eventually to step down as president. Britannula is re-annexed by Great Britain, a Governor is installed, and John Neverbend is forced to return to England with them.

During the passage Neverbend commits to paper the recent history of Britannula, finishing it only two days before his arrival in England. He plans to write another, more theoretical book on the "Fixed Period" and to preach to the English about this necessary step in the progress of mankind. However, he realises that he does not really know whether he will be treated with respect in the old country, or whether he will ever be able to return to Britannula.

== The science fiction element in The Fixed Period ==
Raymond Carr notes that

the publication of the book shocked a public accustomed to find in Trollope the chronicler of contemporary social life. [...] It is an essay in science fiction. Technology will produce 250-lb "swivel guns" that can destroy a city. Naval officers are equipped with mobile (hair) phones. The inhabitants ride steam tricycles, cricketers employ "a mechanical steam bowler." But he was no H. G. Wells. The Britannulans still go round in horse-drawn carriages.

In the field of transportation, generally, the absence of any airborne vehicles is quite striking: when the British cricket team travels to Britannula they do so on a steam ship, and it takes them several weeks to reach their destination. In telecommunications, apart from the above-mentioned "hair telephone," "water telegrams" and a "reporting-telephone apparatus" – all of which were only slight refinements of pre-existing Victorian technology – seem to be the only important inventions. The latter machine enables newspaper readers in London to read a speech held in Gladstonopolis only one hour after it has been given.

== William Osler's "Fixed Period" speech ==
In 1905, after he had been appointed Professor of Medicine at Oxford, Canadian physician William Osler gave a farewell address on leaving Johns Hopkins University School of Medicine in which he referred to Trollope's The Fixed Period in a humorous manner. His words were misconstrued, and Osler was quoted as having advocated euthanasia ("Osler recommends chloroform at sixty"). The concept of mandatory euthanasia for humans after a "fixed period" (often 60 years) became a recurring theme in 20th century imaginative literature — for example, Isaac Asimov's 1950 novel Pebble in the Sky.

== See also ==
- Ageism
- List of dystopian literature
- In particular, see Ira Levin's novel This Perfect Day (1970), where people are scheduled to die at the age of 62.
- Jonathan Swift: A Modest Proposal: For Preventing the Children of Poor People in Ireland from Being a Burden to Their Parents or Country, and for Making Them Beneficial to the Publick (1729)
- Alberto Manguel and Gianni Guadalupi: The Dictionary of Imaginary Places (where Britannula is not included).
- List of fictional islands
- Logan's Run, a movie in which occurs a similar idea of a fixed period before mandatory death
