= The Dead-Tossed Waves =

2010 novel by Carrie Ryan

- Author: Carrie Ryan
- Cover artist: Vikki Sheatsley
- Language: English
- Series: The Forest of Hands and Teeth #2
- Genre: Young adult, Zombie apocalypse
- Publisher: Delacorte Books
- Publication date: March 9, 2010
- Publication place: United States
- Media type: Print (Hardback)
- Pages: 407 pp
- Preceded by: The Forest of Hands and Teeth
- Followed by: The Dark and Hollow Places

The Dead-Tossed Waves is a 2010 young adult novel by Carrie Ryan. It is the sequel to The Forest of Hands and Teeth (2009) and the second book of a trilogy. The third book to make up the trilogy is The Dark and Hollow Places (2011). It was published on March 9, 2010 by Random House Delacorte Press and is written in first person narrative, present tense from the point of view of a teen girl named Gabrielle. The novel is set in a post-apocalyptic world where zombie "Mudo" wander the earth, their sole purpose to infect all living humans.

== Plot summary ==
Gabry (Gabrielle) lives a quiet life in the town of Vista. She lives with her mother, Mary (the protagonist of the first novel), in a lighthouse isolated from the rest of town. Her best friend is Cira, and she is beginning to fall in love with Cira's brother, Catcher.

Cira pressures Gabry to sneak over the wall protecting them from the Mudo to an abandoned amusement park with other teens from Vista. Gabry is afraid that Mudo will get through the un-cared for wall surrounding the park, but she goes when Catcher asks her to. On the other side, she and Catcher go off by themselves to talk and Catcher kisses her. A Breaker Mudo attacks the group, and Catcher is infected while trying to protect her. He tells Gabry to run before the Militia comes and arrests them, and she escapes over the wall, leaving Cira and Catcher behind.

The city decides to send Cira and the others who weren't Infected to the Recruiters. Gabry visits Cira in jail and Cira asks her to sneak over the wall and make sure Catcher is okay. Later, Gabry asks her mother about her past and her father, and Mary accidentally slips and admits that she is not Gabry's biological mother. She found her in the Forest when she was very young.

Gabry sails a small boat around the walls to the amusement park. She is attacked by Mudo and rescued by a stranger named Elias. Elias knows where Catcher is and leads her there. She promises to keep coming back until he turns, despite both boys saying that he is too dangerous. Elias sails back to the lighthouse with her to help her escape a Breaker.

The next morning Mary says that after their conversation she has decided to go back to the Forest. Gabry refuses to go, but stays in the lighthouse and takes over Mary's duties, telling everyone Mary is sick. She finds Elias took the boat to prevent her from returning to Catcher, so she swims to the park. She can't find Catcher but sees Soulers, a cult that worships Mudo. She realizes that Elias is one of them because he has a shaved head and white tunic like they do. She watches as they purposefully infect a little boy due to their belief that being Mudo is a chance at eternal life. Elias sees her and chases after her but she calls him a monster and runs away.

When she swims back, Daniel is there. He is suspicious about Mary's ‘sickness’ and about the knife Gabry carries, which she got from Elias and has Souler inscriptions on it.

A storm comes the next few days, and the Militia hangs around the lighthouse to help her kill the extra Mudo washing ashore. Daniel follows her around and when they leave she goes to visit Cira for the last time. When she tries to sneak over the wall to Catcher, Daniel catches her. She stabs him to escape and leaves him, and later finds that he died from the stab wound. Surprisingly he is still human. Elias and Catcher tell her that he's immune, which is rare to the point that Gabry didn't think it was possible. Elias says that he's not really a Souler, but he tags along with them because it's the easiest way to travel from city to city, which he does because he's looking for his sister, Annah.

Catcher insists that they rescue Cira, so he releases harmless Souler Mudo in Vista. In the chaos, Elias and Gabry break out Cira and the others. Cira tried to commit suicide by slitting her wrists because shet Catcher was Mudo, and even though Gabry binds her wounds she is very weak. They make it to a gate and since Catcher is immune he scouts ahead and finds where the gates start up again. They make it safely to the paths, but the Recruiters build walls out to the gates so they don't have to risk the Forest, which buys Gabry, Elias, Catcher and Cira time. The Recruiters ut that Catcher is immune and know he would be a tremendous resource for the Recruiters because he could fight the Mudo with no danger to himself.

Gabry uses clues from Mary to get them on the right path to Mary's old village. On the way she gets closer to Elias and farther from Catcher (who still thinks he can infect her), and Cira develops a blood infection in her wrists.

They make it to Mary's where they find Mary and Harry. Harry explains that he, Cassandra, and Jacob (Mary's friends from The Forest of Hands and Teeth) went back to the village after Mary left them and helped to reclaim the village from the Mudo for the few survivors. Harry and Cass got married but had no children, and Jacob married a girl who died having twins. The twins were Abigail and Annah, and they grew up friends with Elias. When Elias was seven and the girls were five they explored outside the gates, and when Abigail fell and skinned her knee Elias got scared that he would get in trouble. He and Annah left Abigail behind, planning on returning later, but got lost. Abigail was found by Mary a few days later and was so weak and tramutized that she couldn't even remember her name. Mary named her Gabrielle and took her to Vista, claiming her as her own. Annah and Elias ended up in the Dark City, where they pretended to be siblings and lived together until Elias had to join the Recruiters to get money. When he returned Annah was gone, and he was looking for her but found Gabry instead. Gabry is furious with Elias for not telling her but she forgives him.

Cira asks Catcher to infect her since she is going to die anyway, but he refuses. Gabry is so upset when she hears this that she runs off to be alone, but Elias finds her and kisses her. She is upset because she thinks he only likes her because she is so similar to Annah. Meanwhile, Cira climbs the wall and tries to get infected, but Catcher chases after her and gets her inside the gates before she's infected.

The recruiters finally catch up, and when they break through the gates Mudo get through too. Cira lets herself get infected and when she turns she attacks a Recruiter, and Gabry watches him kill her. She, Elias, Mary, Catcher, and Harry get into the fences on the other side of the village and keep going.

On the journey, Gabry gets more and more depressed because they don't even have a destination and she is thinking that Mudo aren’t really any different than her. Her mother talks to her and convinces her to just accept life the way it is and keep living fully. Gabry and Elias talk and Gabry realizes that she's still has feelings for Catcher even though he is much different now than he used to be, and isn't right for her. Elias kisses her and they realize they love each other, and Gabry wants to start something new and good with him instead of hanging onto her depressing past.

Soon after, while they are walking in the dark, there is a section of fence that collapsed down a hill. Elias doesn't see it and falls over the side, getting stuck on a piece of fence just above where the Mudo can reach him. Catcher gets him up, but Elias's leg is badly broken. The Recruiters are about to catch up, and Elias makes Gabry and Catcher leave so that they can't capture Catcher or make him join the Recruiters by torturing Gabry. Gabry promises to wait for him in the Dark City so they can find each other again.

Gabry and Catcher run away and climb a wall to get away. On the other side there is a big bridge covered with crashed cars and Mudo that goes over a valley filled with a horde of Mudo. Gabry knows she has to cross to escape, so she walks sideways along the tiny ledge on the outside of the bridge, holding onto the gate. There is a section that is almost all the way broken, and when the Recruiters follow, Catcher rolls cars to shift the weight of the bridge and eventually it crumbles so that the Recruiters can't follow. Gabry and Catcher continue on, hoping to get to the Dark City.

== Characters ==
Gabry – The protagonist of The Dead-Tossed Waves. She is a teenaged girl who is described as tall, with long blond hair and green eyes. She lives in fear of the Mudo for most of the time although she can be strong when she faces her fears, and is very protective and loving of her friends. She lives in a lighthouse in Vista with her mother.

Mary – Gabry's mother and the protagonist of The Forest of Hands and Teeth. She is not Gabry's biological mother. She still feels guilty about leaving her friends and Gabry sees her as very strong and fearless. She has dark, graying hair.

Catcher – Cira's brother and Gabry's first love. He is the only known immune. He loves Gabry and his sister, and becomes very guarded and sad once he is infected. He is strong and has dark eyes and almost white hair.

Cira – Gabry's best friend. She is very confident and carefree at first, but becomes depressed and hopeless after Catcher is infected. She has blond hair and always wears a superhero necklace.

Elias – He used to be Gabry's childhood friend and then was a Recruiter. When the novel starts he is traveling with the Soulers. He is very loving and protective, and he still feels guilty for leaving Gabry behind. He has brown hair and green eyes, and he is very strong.

Daniel – A boy in the Militia with a crippled leg who went to school with Gabry. He likes Gabry, and yet is very rough and suspicious of her.

Annah – Gabry's twin sister who lived with Elias for many years pretending to be his sister. She is tall with blond hair and green eyes like Gabry, but she never appears in the book.

Harry – Mary's former betrothed, Cass's widower, and Jacob's father figure. He is strong and protective of Mary. He has brown hair.

Jacob – Gabry and Annah's father who traveled with Mary in The Forest of Hands and Teeth. He loved the twins and got lost in the forest looking for them when they disappeared.

Mellie – A beautiful girl from Vista who is infected and turns Breaker at the amusement park and infects Catcher. She is killed by Catcher.

Blane – A girl from Vista who is imprisoned with Cira. She is rude to Gabry but is a friend to Cira.

Griffin – A boy from Vista who is infected and turns Breaker at the amusement park and later attacks Gabry and Elias.

== Terminology ==
Mudo/Unconsecrated – Humans who are Infected and Return zombies. Most of them are slow and uncoordinated, but still dangerous because there are so many. They have no human memories or sympathies, and have only one goal: to infect humans.

Breaker – A Mudo who is much faster and more dangerous than a normal Mudo. They are very hard to kill and can infect whole populations. If infected, people will turn Breaker when they Return if there are no other Mudo around.

Return – What happens when someone is infected and die only to be resurrected as a Mudo.

Immune – A person who will not die and Return if infected. Their skin is hot to the touch. Immunes are very rare, and the children of Vista were told it wasn't even true that people could be Immune.

Horde – an enormous group of Mudo. When Gabry first sees a horde, she describes it as an ocean of bodies.

Soulers – A nomadic cult that worships Mudo. They believe that being Mudo is an honor and that it is a second chance at life and the path to eternal life. The Soulers have been known to purposefully turn members into Mudo. They travel from city to city trying to spread their beliefs and typically have shaved heads and wear white tunics.

Protectorate – The grouping of towns protected by walls and the Recruiters. Protectorate can refer to either the area itself or the government running them.

Vista – The town Gabry has lived in since age five. It is small and far from most other towns, mostly forgotten by the Protectorate. It is run by a Council and the Chairman of the Council, and it has a lighthouse and an abandoned amusement park.

Militia – The local guards and protectors of Vista.

Recruiters – The main military of the Protectorate. It is a very professional and honorable position to be in the Recruiters, although it is extremely dangerous—only about 1 in 7 survive the first year. Former Recruiters are allowed free housing in the Dark City and full citizenship, excepting people who are forced to join as a punishment, such as Cira.

== The Title ==
The title The Dead-Tossed Waves is said directly on page 395. Gabry says it to describe the huge amount of Mudo in a horde. The "Waves" also reflects Gabry's home by the ocean. In The Forest of Hands and Teeth, Mary's dream is to make it to the ocean because she believes it will be free of Mudo, so the title could also be seen as reflecting Mary's false hope.
