= James Rice (writer) =

English novelist (1843–1882)

James Rice (26 September 1843 – 26 April 1882), English novelist, wrote a number of successful novels in collaboration with Walter Besant.

He was born in Northampton, and was educated at Cambridge University. He studied law, becoming a lawyer of Lincoln's Inn in 1871.

In 1868, he bought the publication Once a Week. It was loss-making, but made him acquainted with Besant. Together they had a successful collaboration, ended by Rice's death. He died in Redhill.

== Works, all with Walter Besant ==
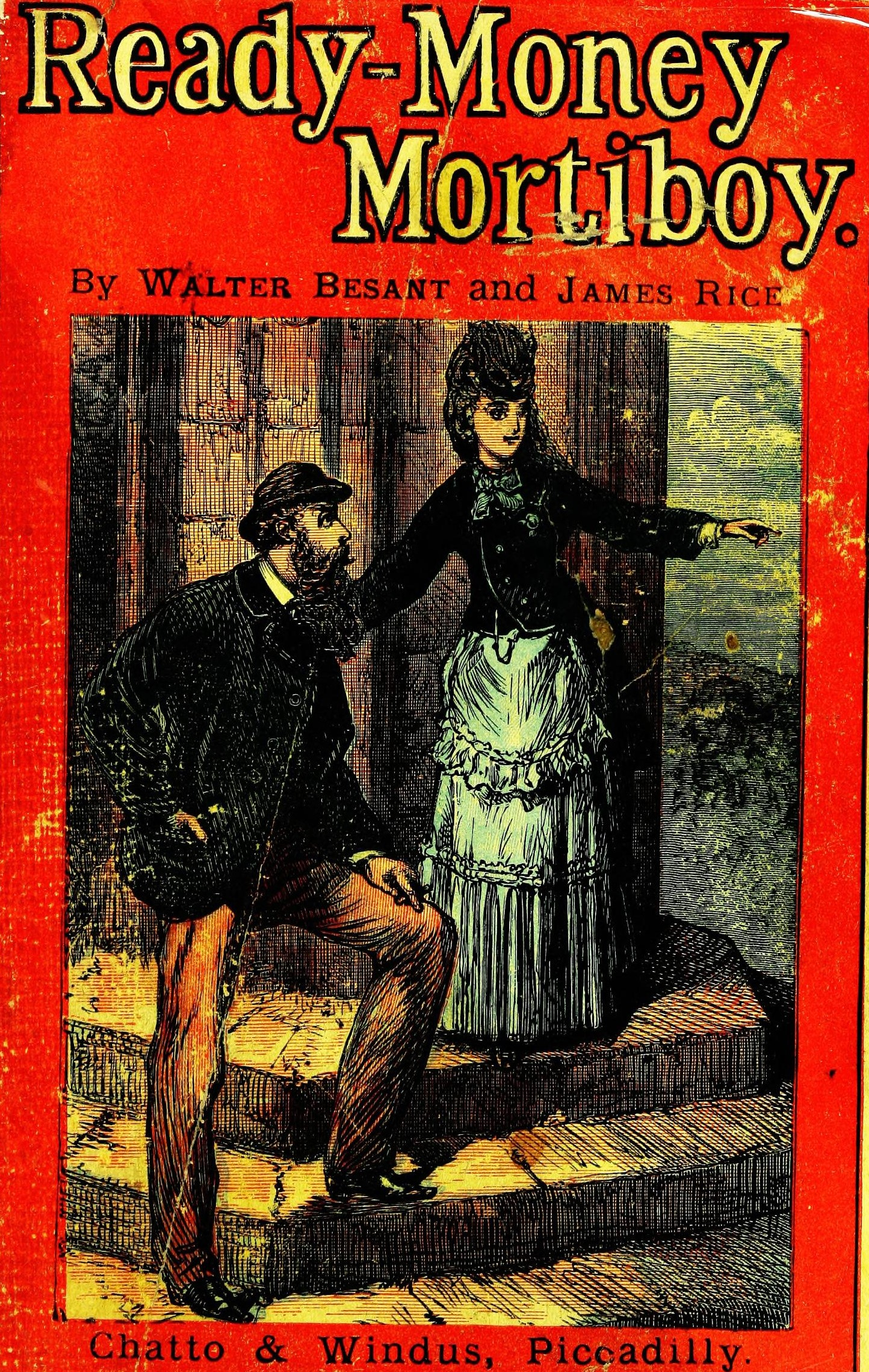
1890 Yellowback cover of Ready-Money Mortiboy

- Ready-Money Mortiboy (1872)
- My Little Girl (1873)
- With Harp and Crown (1874)
- This Son of Vulcan (1876)
- The Golden Butterfly (1876)
- The Case of Mr Lucraft (1876) stories
- The Monks of Thelema (1878)
- By Celia's Arbour. A Tale of Portsmouth Town. (1878)
- 'Twas in Trafalgar's Bay (1879) stories
- The Seamy Side (1880)
- The Chaplain of the Fleet (1881)
- Sir Richard Whittington (1881)
- The Ten Years Tenant (1881) stories
