= Fernando A. Flores =

Mexican-American author

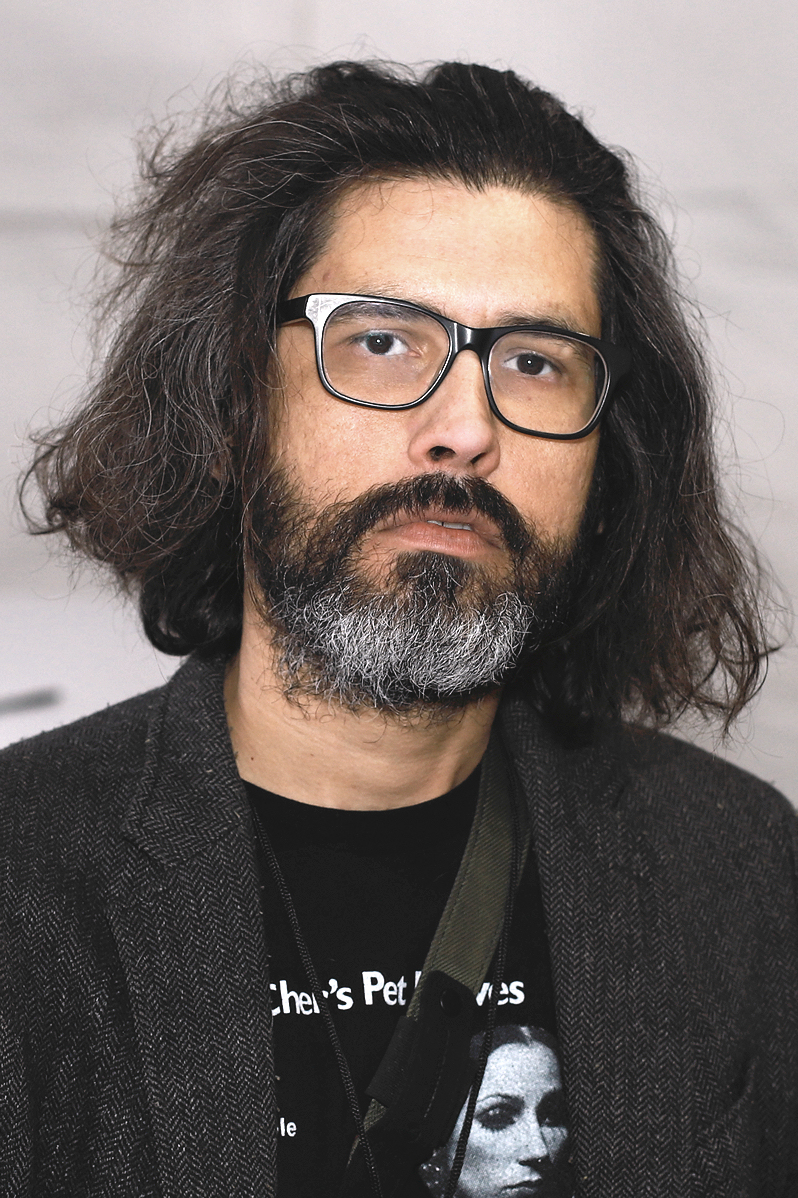
Flores at the 2022 Texas Book Festival.

Fernando A. Flores is a Mexican-American author. His works include the novel Tears of the Trufflepig, which was long-listed for the Center for Fiction First Novel Prize, and the short story collections Death to the Bullshit Artists of South Texas, Vol. 1 and Death to the Bullshit Artists of South Texas. He is a recipient of an Alfredo Cisneros Del Moral Foundation grant, and won the Writers’ League of Texas Discovery Prize in Fiction in 2018.

== Early life and education ==
Flores was born in Reynosa, Mexico but raised in Alton, Texas. He moved to South Texas at a young age near McAllen, Texas, a border town. He studied at the (now called) University of Texas at Rio Grande Valley (UTRGV). Fernando Flores eventually dropped out of college but was hired as an employee. He was attracted to literature, so he passed his time as an audiovisual technician by learning and reading at the university's library.

== Career ==
Flores moved to Austin, Texas, to pursue his career as a writer. Flores works part-time at Malvern Books in Austin, Texas, an Indie bookstore concentrating on lesser-known writers. Working at Malvern Books allows Flores to write. His fiction and poetry have appeared in a variety of publications.

He won an honorable mention award from the Alfredo Cisneros Del Moral Foundation. In September 2014, Flores was awarded the Alfredo Cisneros Del Moral Foundation grant. He credits his ability to finish Tears of the Trufflepig to the $10,000 writing reward he received from the San Antonio–based grant.

Fernando Flores has four published books, Death to the Bullshit Artists of South Texas, Vol. 1, Death to the Bullshit Artists of South Texas, Tears of the Truffle Pig, and, most recently, Brother Brontë . These books take place and are influenced by the border region.

== Influences ==
=== Literary ===
Fernando Flores is an avid reader. He is influenced and moved by artist like Emily Brontë, Pierre Reverdy, and Rimbaud. Flores enjoys finding the weird in a piece of work. He is fascinated by the bizarre which is a reflection of his artistic work. All his published books embrace and embody psychedelic literature.

=== Musical ===
Flores has a great interest in music. In his debut novel, Tears of the Trufflepig, Flores draws inspiration from musical elements and history to produce texture into his work. In an interview with Guernica, Flores expresses that "[he is] interested more in the regular people who would get together and play music, the kinds of tales or warnings that were handed down through songs, and, most importantly, the psychedelic time signatures."

== Awards and recognition ==
=== Awards ===
In September 2014, Flores was awarded the Alfredo Cisneros Del Moral Foundation grant. In the same year, Fernando was nominated for the Pushcart Prize.

In 2018, he won the Writers’ League of Texas Discovery Prize in Fiction. In 2019, Tears of the Trufflepig was long-listed for the Center for Fiction First Novel Prize.

=== Recognition ===
In 2015, Flores was profiled as part of Texas Monthly‘s Ten Writers to Watch list, and noted as one of the "crucial" authors described in a 2019 Texas Monthly article, "Reinventing the Canon: Why It’s More Important Than Ever to Read Latinx Literature."

== Bibliography ==
=== Novels ===
- Tears of the Trufflepig (2019)
- Brother Brontë (2025)

=== Short story collection ===
- Death to the Bullshit Artists of South Texas, Vol. 1 (2014)
- Death to the Bullshit Artists of South Texas (2018)
- Valleyesque (2022)
