= The Inner House (novel) =

1888 novel by Walter Besant

The Inner House is a novel by Walter Besant published in 1888. It is set a few centuries in the future and is a dystopian fantasy about a society which has reached a stage of inert uniformity under the control of an elite group of scientists who have discovered an elixir of immortality. The plot follows a rebel group which wishes to restore the more exciting conditions of nineteenth-century life. It has been described as an anticipation of Aldous Huxley's Brave New World.

== Sources ==
- http://www.victorianweb.org/authors/besantw/diniejko1.html
- Machann, Clinton (2016). "Violence and the Construction of Masculinity in Walter Besant's the Inner House". The Journal of Men's Studies. 4 (2): 131–140. doi:10.1177/106082659500400203. S2CID 151639380.
