= Wither (DeStefano novel) =

2011 novel by Lauren DeStefano

- First edition
- Author: Lauren DeStefano
- Cover artist: Lizzy Bromley
- Language: English
- Series: The Chemical Garden Trilogy
- Genre: Dystopian science fiction
- Publisher: Simon & Schuster Children's Publishing
- Publication date: March 22, 2011
- Publication place: United States
- Media type: Print (hardback)
- Pages: 368
- ISBN: 978-1-4424-0905-7
- Followed by: Fever

Wither is a 2011 young-adult dystopian novel written by Lauren DeStefano. It was originally published on March 22, 2011, by Simon & Schuster Children's Publishing. It is set in a future where scientists succeeded in engineering a perfect generation of humans, free of illness and disorders, but as a consequence, also created a virus that plagues that generation's children and their children's children, killing females at age 20 and males at age 25. The fallout from this disaster drastically set apart the poor, who scavenge for food in a society that has few to no workers, from the rich, who celebrate each new building built as the continuance of the human race. It is the first book of The Chemical Garden Trilogy. The second book, Fever, was released in February 2012. The third and final book, Sever, was released in February 2013.

== Plot ==
Wither describes a future wherein genetic engineering has produced a generation of humans free from diseases and genetic defects. Because of this, people worldwide have largely abandoned natural conception in favor of genetically engineered embryos. This generation, later dubbed "The First Generation", lived unusually long and prosperous lives. However, their children and grandchildren, though born healthy, were affected by a virus that kills all females at age 20 and all males at age 25. Humanity searches for a cure as society becomes increasingly divided between the rich and the poor. Groups known as "Gatherers" hunt and abduct young girls from the streets. These girls are either sold to labs to be used for research or sold to wealthy men as brides. Girls who are not sold may be forced into prostitution or killed.

In Manhattan, Rhine Ellery and her twin brother Rowan live alone in their parents’ old home; their scientist parents were killed in an explosion at their laboratory when the twins were twelve. Now sixteen, Rhine is captured by the Gatherers and sold to 21-year-old Linden Ashby at his estate in Florida. She blames her being chosen rather than killed on her eyes, having blue-brown heterochromia that Rowan shares. Rhine finds herself forced to marry Linden along with two other girls, 18-year-old Jenna and 13-year-old Cecily. They join Rose as Linden's new brides, but the ailing Rose is already 20 years of age and does not have long left to live. Upon meeting Rose, Rhine is told that she and Linden are perfect for each other; they have the same amount of time left. Horrified by this, Rhine instantly begins plotting how to return to Manhattan and her brother.

Life in the Ashby manor is very comfortable. Cecily embraces it, having been an orphan longing for a family, and Jenna endures it forlornly while Rhine constantly thinks of ways to escape. She befriends her servant Gabriel and behaves as a good wife in front of Linden and his father, Housemaster Vaughn, in order to earn the title of "First Wife", which would grant her additional privileges to roam the mansion. Rhine sets that as a goal in order to plan her escape.

Rose grows more ill as Vaughan, an experienced doctor and scientist, experiments with ways to treat the virus and prolong her life despite her desire to die in peace. After her eventual death, Linden isolates himself before Rhine reluctantly coaxes him out of hiding. Soon after, he turns his attention to Cecily, who falls pregnant. Jenna and Rhine bond and Jenna admits that she was a prostitute in the Scarlet District prior to her abduction and was Gathered alongside her two younger sisters, who were shot to death rather than being sold as brides. Rhine offers to help her escape, but Jenna says she has nothing to return to and would rather die in the comfort of Linden’s mansion.

After accidentally going down to the basement with Gabriel, Rhine comes across attendants carting a gurney down the hallway, realizing the body on the gurney belongs to Rose and learning from Gabriel and Deirdre, Rhine’s young domestic, that Vaughan experiments on the bodies of anyone who dies within the mansion. She also learns from Deirdre that Rose had a stillborn daughter when she was nineteen, but that both Rose and Deirdre had heard the baby cry after birth; Rhine comes to believe that Vaughan killed his grandchild to spite Rose and to gain a new test subject.

During a hurricane, the brides, Linden, and Vaughan move to the storm shelter in the basement and Rhine sits with Linden to look over blueprints for houses he’s designed. He has sketched the houses in vivid detail, fascinating Rhine and causing them to bond. They nearly kiss, and Rhine is so disgusted by this that she waits for the next hurricane to break the window in her bedroom. She climbs out and runs across the grounds, becoming seriously wounded by flying debris and being returned to the mansion. She recovers from her wounds and Gabriel expresses his fear of losing her, whereupon they kiss for the first time but quickly separate when they hear a noise in the hallway. Jenna and Cecily come to visit her as her recovery continues and the three sister wives bond further.

Rhine earns Linden’s favor, owing this to her physical resemblance to Rose, and he begins taking her out to events more and more often. She bonds with him, learning that Vaughan has complete control over Linden’s life and that he may be just as much a prisoner as the brides. She has several run-ins with Vaughan in which he warns her not to break Linden’s heart and that she would be a very valuable test subject. He further threatens Jenna, who seems extremely frightened of him, though he seems to think Cecily inconsequential. After weeks of spending time with Gabriel, Gabriel is unexpectedly reassigned to the basement indefinitely. Cecily goes into labor, and though Jenna encourages Rhine to use the opportunity to find Gabriel, Rhine fears leaving Cecily alone with Vaughan when she is so vulnerable. Cecily gives birth to a son that she and Linden name Bowen at Vaughan’s suggestion, neither of them knowing that Linden had a brother who died of the virus years before Linden was born with that same name.

After Jenna sets fire to the sitting room, Rhine sneaks down to the basement and reunites with Gabriel, and the two plan an escape from the mansion. This plan is waylaid by Jenna’s sudden illness, showing all of the signs of the virus despite her being only nineteen at this time. She deteriorates rapidly, far more rapidly than Rose, and each sister wife wonders if this illness is something else entirely. Vaughan’s attempts to treat her fail and she dies early one morning. Cecily’s and Rhine’s grief is extreme, with Rhine refusing to be around Linden until after he takes her to another event. Soon after, she and Cecily meet outside and Cecily confesses that she was the noise in the hall when Rhine and Gabriel first kissed, having told Vaughan and causing his reassignment. She’d also told Vaughan that Jenna had been helping Rhine meet with Gabriel, and Rhine hysterically comes to realize that Cecily’s actions have gotten Jenna killed. She shouts as much at Cecily, who tries to reject this, but Rhine flees back inside the mansion.

Despite the severe snowy conditions, Rhine plots her and Gabriel’s escape a few nights after and leaves without saying goodbye to Cecily, though she gives a cryptic goodbye to Linden. She escapes outside and makes her way through the storm to the gate surrounding the mansion, waiting for Gabriel to arrive. Eventually he does, aided by another attendant, and the two find their way to the docks and board a ship. Gabriel, with his interest in boating, manages to sail them away and Rhine looks forward to the journey and to finding her brother.

== Main characters ==
- Rhine Ellery: A sixteen-year-old girl from Manhattan who was kidnapped to be Linden's wife. She is the narrator and protagonist of the novel. She and her brother Rowan were orphaned at twelve due to an explosion at the lab their parents worked in. Both twins have heterochromia; one blue eye and one brown eye.
- Linden Ashby: A twenty-one-year-old architect who marries Rhine, Jenna, and Cecily at the start of the novel. He is also married to Rose. He had an older brother who died from the virus before Linden was born.
- Jenna: The oldest of Linden's new wives at 18. She dislikes living in the mansion as much as Rhine but is less adamant about trying to escape. She had two sisters who were also Gathered with her, but neither was chosen as Linden's brides and both were subsequently killed.
- Cecily: The youngest of the sister wives at 13. She is the most excited and interested about the marriage and enjoys her new life. She had been raised in an orphanage and much prefers the mansion. She often fantasizes about being a mother, and later bears a baby boy named Bowen. She is also very skilled in piano.
- Rose: Linden's first wife, age 20, who is bedridden because of her age and failing health. She is stressed by the medicines given to her and wishes for death. She and Linden had been wed when Rose was eleven years old after the alleged death of her parents. Rose was once pregnant with Linden's child, a girl, but was told that the baby was stillborn.
- Vaughn Ashby: Linden's father and Housemaster of the mansion where the novel takes place. He seeks a cure for the virus, using whomever and whatever means necessary.
- Gabriel: One of many servants in the mansion. He is eighteen years old. He was bought from an auction at an orphanage when he was nine. He is assigned to care for Rhine and develops a relationship with her, and the pair eventually escapes together.
- Rowan Ellery: Rhine's twin brother, who is seen only in flashbacks of their life together before Rhine was kidnapped. Rhine believes he is still in New York, looking for her.
- Deirdre: Rhine's "domestic" in the Ashby Mansion, who prepares Rhine's hair, makeup, and wardrobe; as well as serving as a personal assistant to Rhine. Deirdre is a young orphan, and her father was a skilled painter who taught her about art. She's also a very talented seamstress.
- Bowen: Cecily's and Linden's son, named after Linden's deceased older brother, who is often seen crying and fussing.

== Publication history ==
Wither was first published as a hardcover in the United States on March 22, 2011, by Simon & Schuster Children's Publishing. It has sold to several countries around the world. It was published in the Italian language under the title Il Giardino Degli Eterni: Dolce Veleno on April 7, 2011. In the Netherlands it was published under the title Verwelken by Unieboek Het Spectrum. It was published as Wither (translated as Layu) in Indonesia by Penerbit Kantera in June 2011. It was published in the French language under the title Le Dernier Jardin Tome 1: Ephémère on August 19, 2011. It is available as an e-book from Simon & Schuster and other e-book carriers. It is also available as an audiobook, produced by Recorded Books, LLC.

== Critical reception ==
Publishers Weekly gave Wither a starred review, calling DeStefano's debut novel "harrowing". B. Kunzel from VOYA calls Wither a "thought-provoking novel" that "will also stimulate discussion in science and ethics classes". Kirkus Reviews recommends Wither "to fans of The Hunger Games trilogy or Ally Condie's Matched." Booklist claims that "many [readers] will appreciate the intense character drama". Carrie Ryan, author of The Forest of Hands and Teeth, says about Wither: "Lauren DeStefano crafts an all too believable future. I loved the world, the romance, the writing -- exactly the kind of book I've been craving to read."

== Film adaptation ==
Universal Pictures acquired the film rights on October 23, 2013.
