= Fever (Destefano novel) =

2013 novel by Lauren DeStefano

- First edition
- Author: Lauren DeStefano
- Cover artist: Ali Smith
- Language: English
- Series: The Chemical Garden Trilogy
- Genre: Dystopian science fiction
- Publisher: Simon & Schuster Book's For Young Readers
- Publication date: February 12, 2012
- Publication place: United States
- Media type: Print (hardback)
- Pages: 349
- ISBN: 9781442409088
- Preceded by: Wither
- Followed by: Sever

Fever is a 2013 young-adult dystopian novel written by Lauren DeStefano. It was published on February 12. 2012, by Simon & Schuster Book's For Young Readers. It takes place in a dystopian future where scientists have created a generation of perfect humans, who suffer from no illnesses or disorders. However, an unforeseen virus derived from the cure plagues the children and the grandchildren of the perfection generation and kills females at age 20 and males at age 25. This leads to a dramatic crisis in the population with the young dying and the perfect generation reaching old age, and a race to create a cure. It is the second book of The Chemical Garden Trilogy. The first book, Wither, was released in March 2011. The third and final book, Sever, was released in December 2013.

== Plot ==
Fever takes place in a future where genetic sciences have created a cure of all diseases and illness for humanity. This cure allows for the "First Generation" of perfect humans free from ailments. The First Generation live long and healthy lives, but their children and grandchildren suffer from a virus created from the cure which kills the younger generations. The virus kills females at the age of 20 and males at the age of 25. This creates a dramatic crisis in population and a disparity between the rich and poor. Females are valued for research or sold into prostitution by Gatherers.

After being kidnapped by Gatherers in Manhattan, Rhine Ellery was sold to Linden Ashby and forced to marry him. After gaining the trust of Linden and befriending a servant Gabriel, Rhine and Gabriel escape the Florida mansion and start the journey to reunite with her twin brother Rowan back in New York.

Beginning the trek back to New York, Gabriel and Rhine face dangerous roads and the threat of being recaptured. Rhine and Gabriel become the captors of a circus caravan that doubles as a brothel, and are forced to stay with the troop and perform a star-crossed lovers act. Here, they meet a prostitute named Lilac and her disabled daughter, Maddie. The group hatch a plan to escape the troop, and are successful; however, Lilac does not make it out with them. Continuing their journey to New York, Rhine, Gabriel, and Maddie must continue to evade the search efforts of Housemaster Vaughn. When they make it to New York, Rhine finds that her house is burnt down and there is no trace of her brother. Gabriel is suffering from drugs given to him in at the circus, and Rhine is beginning to feel the effects of the virus despite her age, and so Rhine and Gabriel decide to stay at an orphanage that is run by Maddie's grandmother – a first generation woman.

Rhine is in danger of succumbing to the virus as her fever rises and her hair falls out. One morning Housemaster Vaughn finds her alone outside and offers her a chance to reverse the effects of the virus. He reveals that June Beans, a candy Rose Ashby introduced to Rhine and that Gabriel often used to sneak her, contained a micro-dose of the virus courtesy of Vaughan. Without the June Beans, Rhine has begun feeling the effects of the virus and will die without Vaughan’s help. He threatens to burn down the orphanage if Rhine will not come with him, and so she returns to the Ashbys’ Florida mansion.

She is told that Linden is aware of her presence but has completely disowned her after her escape, and she is left in the basement with Vaughan and his attendants. He gives her numerous experimental drugs, many of which cause extreme hallucinations and illness. Deirdre, her former domestic, finds her and begins to visit her often, teaching her how to slip out of her restraints. Deirdre herself is the subject of horrific experiments involving fertility and pre-pubescent childbirth, and tells Rhine that Vaughan found her through a tracker implanted in her leg when she was first Gathered. Cecily, a few months into her second pregnancy, also begins sneaking downstairs to visit her and says that she won’t let Vaughan hurt her anymore.

After escaping her restraints one day, Rhine breaks a glass and cuts into her leg to find the tracker but loses consciousness before she can. Cecily and Linden find her, whereupon Rhine realizes Linden was entirely unaware of her presence in the mansion. He is horrified at his father’s actions and quickly helps Rhine to a hospital, and is stunned when they retrieve the tracker from her leg. She attempts to tell him of Vaughan’s insidious acts, but he refuses to believe her and accuses everything she says of being a lie.

While recovering, Rhine sees a news broadcast on the television in her room of a movement from the Pro-naturalists, a rebellious group who believe that the human race should be allowed to die off from the virus and go to great lengths to spread this message; Pro-naturalists were behind the bombing of Rhine’s and Rowan’s parents’ lab. To Rhine’s shock, one figure steps forward to protest the attempts to find a cure for the virus, and she sees that this figure has one brown eye and one blue; it is her brother Rowan.

== Main characters ==
- Rhine Ellery: A seventeen-year-old girl from Manhattan who was kidnapped to be Linden's wife. She is the narrator and protagonist of the novel. Rhine has heterochromia, one blue eye and one brown eye.
- Linden Ashby: A young architect who has married Rhine, Jenna, Cecily, and Rose.
- Cecily: The youngest of the sister wives at 14.
- Vaughn Ashby: Linden's father and Housemaster of the Florida mansion. He is searching for a cure to the virus, and is willing to do anything to achieve it.
- Gabriel: One of the servants in the mansion. He is assigned to Rhine, and later escapes with her, the two having become romantically involved.
- Rowan Ellery: Rhine's twin brother, whom they are searching for back in New York.
- Lilac: A prostitute from the circus brothel. She plans an escape attempt with Rhine and Gabriel but does not make it out.
- Maddie: The mentally and physically disabled daughter of Lilac. She escapes from the brothel with Rhine and Gabriel and is reunited with her maternal First Generation grandmother.
- Madam: The founder of the circus brothel. She is very emotionally unstable and resents Rhine because of her resemblance to her late daughter. She knows Vaughan from a previous encounter and seems vaguely familiar to Rhine.

== Publication history ==
Fever was published as a hardcover in the United States on February 12, 2013, by Simon & Schuster Children's Book's For Young Readers.
