= Walter Besant Memorial =

Memorial on the Victoria Embankment, London

Coordinates: 51.5096°N 0.1185°W

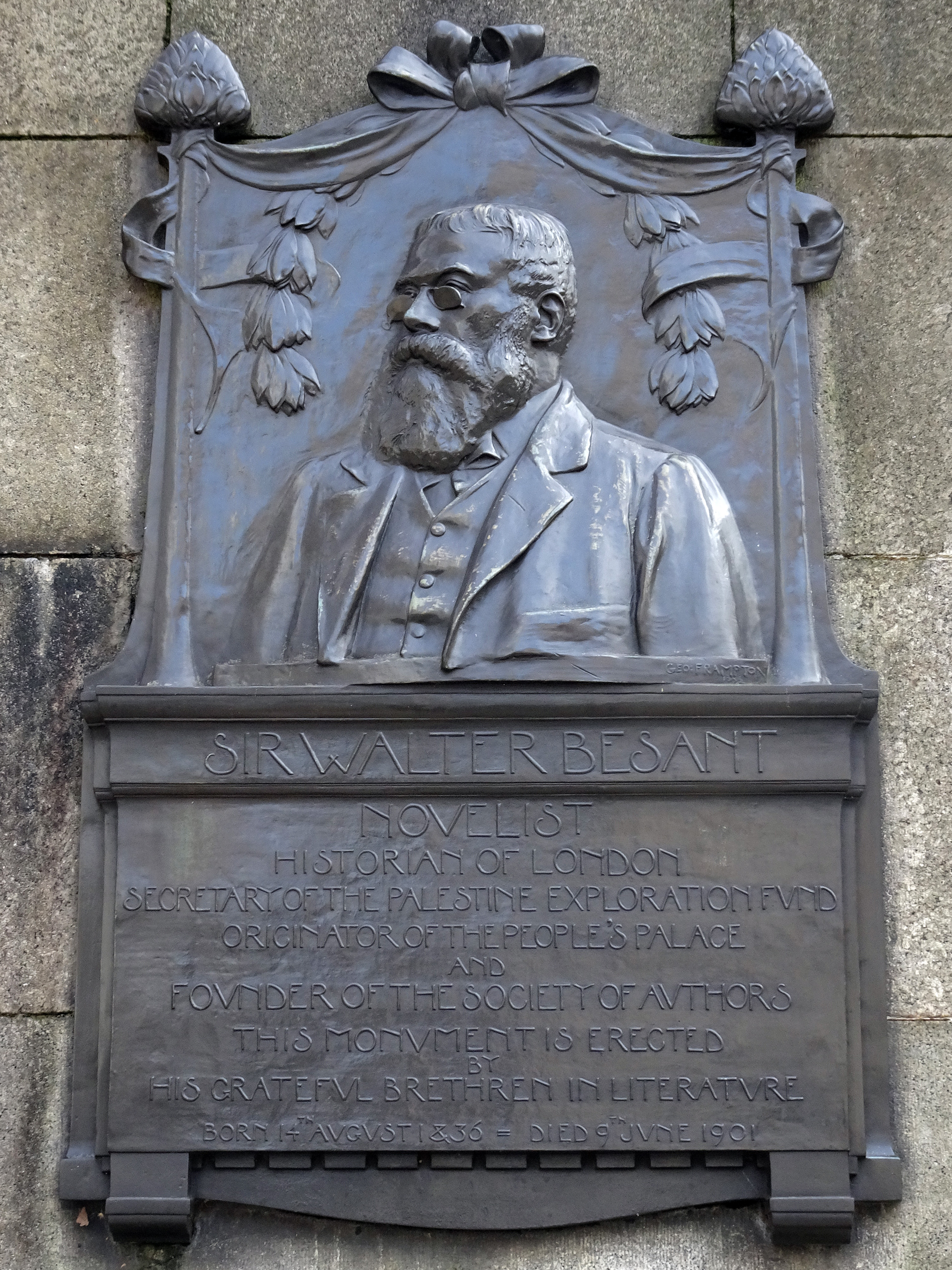
- Artist: George Frampton
- Completion date: 1904
- Subject: Walter Besant
- Location: London

The Memorial to Walter Besant is a bronze bas-relief on the Victoria Embankment in London. It is considered peculiar for the presence of eye-glasses on the sculpture, considered the earliest example of it in London.

The memorial is dedicated to Walter Besant, a novelist and historian of London. A campaigner for authors' rights, he is among the founders of the Society of Authors, who placed the memorial on the Embankment in 1904. Besant also played a role in the creation of the People's Palace in Mile End. The memorial is the work of George Frampton.
