= Tears of the Trufflepig =

2019 debut novel by Fernando Flores

- First edition
- Author: Fernando A. Flores
- Cover artist: Na Kim
- Publisher: FSG Originals
- Pages: 336 pages

Tears of the Trufflepig is a 2019 novel by writer Fernando A. Flores. Though it is not Flores' first published book, it is his first novel. The novel is set in a future where normal, farmed food is scarce and the rich survive through the use of "filtered" animals and plants, created artificially. "Filtered" animals tend to be extinct taxa, restored to life to serve as food, clothing, or entertainment.

== Setting ==
The book takes place in Texas and Mexico at an unspecified point in the future. Disease is common, crime syndicates control most food production, and wealthy collectors have created a market for the shrunken heads of the indigenous people of the Americas.

== Development and writing ==
Flores eschews the use of a computer during writing, preferring to use an Olivetti Lettera 32, and used the typewriter to compose Tears of the Trufflepig. Flores won a $10,000 award for his first book, Death to the Bullshit Artists of South Texas, Vol. 1. The prize allowed Flores to work part-time, giving him an opportunity to focus more on Tears of the Trufflepig than he otherwise would have. The first draft of the book was completed in 2014.

Flores cites Roberto Bolaño's book 2666 as an inspiration, and has referred to the book as "[...] the best border novel of all time". Flores created a nine-song Spotify playlist to accompany the book.

== Reception ==
Kirkus Reviews described the novel as "A dryly philosophical, colorful, and disorienting thriller about grief, survival, and undead animals," while Publishers Weekly wrote, "Flores’s novel is jam-packed with excitement, but his inability to prioritize his ideas prevents them from cohering into a credible vision of dystopia." Leah Schnelbach writes for Tor.com, "Flores gives us a near-future that is often fun and rollicking, but he’s never afraid to show us the reality that is all-too-close to the world we’re living in right now."
