= The Time Hoppers =

Novel by Robert Silverberg

First edition Cover art by Rudolph de Harak

The Time Hoppers is a science fiction novel by American writer Robert Silverberg, first published by Doubleday in 1967. The plot concerns Joe Quellen, a 25th-century bureaucrat charged with investigating "hoppers", travelers from the future whose presence in the past has been documented for hundreds of years, and his brother-in-law, Norman Pomrath, an unemployed blue collar worker who ends up being presented with an opportunity to travel back in time.

== Plot ==
Joe Quellen is a Class Seven bureaucrat in a highly stratified, overpopulated 25th century Earth with a one world government. Those who are in lower classes, such as his sister and brother-in-law in Classes Fourteen and Fifteen, only have the right to a one-room apartment, with even the shower out for full display. Oxygen is rationed. Quellen has managed to find a house for himself in Africa, but if this is discovered he would be severely punished as living space in the world is at a premium. The level of technology is highly advanced; teleportation is a reality, as is time travel. When the novel opens, Quellen's superiors have discovered that missing segments of the population have time-traveled into the past for a better quality of life; they don't know whether to be happy that they had shed thousands of people, or concerned that the time-travelers might change history. Quellen is assigned the task of dealing with the situation.
