= Veronica Rossi =

Brazilian-American novelist (born 1973)

- Born: June 16, 1973 (age 53); Rio de Janeiro, Brazil
- Occupation: Novelist
- Writing career
- Genres: young adult, dystopian
- Notable work: Under the Never Sky trilogy
- Website: www.veronicarossi.com

Veronica Rossi (born 16 June 1973) is a Brazilian-American novelist known for her debut New York Times-bestselling book trilogy Under the Never Sky. Film rights to the trilogy have been optioned by Warner Brothers Studios, with the novel being sold in more than 25 international markets.

== Biography ==
Rossi moved often in her childhood and lived in Mexico and Venezuela. Before Rossi wrote her first book, she completed undergraduate studies at the University of California, Los Angeles and went on to study fine art at the California College of the Arts in San Francisco. Her new novel Riders is expected for a release in 2016. She also co-authors new adult novels under the pen name Noelle August with writer and editor, Lorin Oberweger.

Rossi currently lives in Northern California with her husband and two sons. When not writing, she enjoys reading, painting, and counting down the minutes until she can get back to making up stories about imaginary people.

== Bibliography ==
=== Under the Never Sky series ===
- Under the Never Sky (2012)
- Through the Ever Night (2013)
- Into the Still Blue (2014)
- Roar of the Tides (2023)

=== Riders series ===
- Riders (2016)
- Seeker (2017)

=== Standalones ===
- Rebel Spy (2020)
