= Article 5 (novel) =

2012 novel by Kristen Simmons

- Author: Kristen Simmons
- Language: English
- Series: Trilogy
- Genre: Young adult fiction, Dystopian fiction
- Publisher: Tor Teen
- Publication date: January 2012
- Publication place: United States
- Media type: Bibliography
- Pages: 364
- ISBN: 978-0-7653-2958-5
- Followed by: Breaking Point

Article 5 is a 2012 young adult dystopian romance novel by Kristen Simmons. The book was published in January 2012 by Tor Teen and is the first installment in a trilogy. The novel tells the story of Ember Miller and Chase Jennings, two teenagers who are on the run from the government in a post-War dystopian America. It was followed by two sequels titled Breaking Point and Three.

== Plot summary ==
The backstory tells of a war that changes America and leads to the implementing of the Federal Bureau of Reformation, also known as the Moral Militia and a complete upheaval of the Bill of Rights, leaving the Moral Statues. Also in the backstory, there are details about Ember Miller, a 17-year-old girl living in Knoxville, Tennessee, and Chase Jennings, an FBR soldier and Ember's childhood best friend and love interest. The inciting incident is when Ember and her mother are taken away for noncompliance with Article 5, which pertains to children conceived out of wedlock. Ember and her mother are separated, and Ember is sent to the Girls Reformatory and Rehabilitation Center of West Virginia, where they send all female minors involved in breaking the Moral Statutes. While at the reformatory, Ember feels that she has to get out of there and find her mother. So with the help of Rebecca's boyfriend, Ember tries, unsuccessfully, to escape and is taken to a torture room. Meanwhile, Chase has a personal goal: to keep Ember safe. Chase breaks Ember out of the rehabilitation center; they both run away to Virginia to find the person who will transport them to a safe house, where Ember's mom is supposed to be.

When they reach the carrier's house, the man who was supposed to transport them is shot by the FBR. Just before he dies, he tells Ember and Chase of a carrier in West Virginia, and Chase and Ember head off to the next carrier. Later in the narrative, Ember saves a farmer's son from poachers, and are both invited to an awkward dinner. After dinner, Ember and Chase go upstairs, and Chase kisses Ember. While they are upstairs, the farmer secretly calls the FBR to turn in Chase, who is now an AWOL soldier and Ember, a runaway. When Ember overhears a discussion about the phone call, the two characters leave as soon as possible. Later in the plot, they come across people and hear that there is a carrier and a whole underground system in Knoxville who will take them to a safe house, so the two start towards their home town.

Ember and Chase get closer to Knoxville when they realize that the western half of Knoxville is closed to civilians to make way for an MM base. They walk through the streets, crowded with homeless people and busy workers. As they advance, a large group of people seem to turn into a pack of wolves when they see abandoned supplies and food and go after it. In the confusion, Ember gets separated from Chase. Just as she is continuing to be pushed away, a person grabs her arm and pulls her out of the crowd.

Ember realizes that the person is Sean Banks, dressed in a stolen soldier's uniform. Ember then tells Chase to get off Sean allowing him to tell Ember why he grabbed her. Sean then tells Ember that he is a part of the resistance and that he wants Ember to tell him where Rebecca Lansing is. They then leave the ally and go to the Knoxville Resistance Headquarters where they meet Wallace. Ember tells Sean what happened with her and Rebecca at the reformatory. Ember wakes up later to hear Chase and the Resistance talking about recruiting when Ember brings up the topic of what happens to Article 5 breaking victims. Ember is told that people who break Article 5 are killed. Chase then confesses that he was forced to kill her mother.

Ember later leaves the Resistance hideout and is captured and taken to the Knoxville Detention center. At the Knoxville detention center, Ember meets Tucker Morris who promises freedom in exchange for information on Chase's location. Ember refuses and is placed on cleaning duty where she learns the layout of the facility. Ember is asked to enter Tucker's office where she is molested in exchange for information on Rebecca Lansing. She is then told that Rebecca is in a reformatory in Chicago. She leaves and creates a plan to escape from the detention center. Ember wakes up to violence in the hallway she goes out to check and finds chase beaten by guards. She is then told that chase willingly wanted to be captured. Ember then escapes with Chase by disguising him as a dead man in a cart. She takes him up the hill where she meets Tucker. Chase tackles Tucker while Ember pulls out the gun she stole earlier and aims it at Tucker. Tucker is then allowed to escape in exchange of allowing them to escape. Chase and Ember then meet Sean beside a trash bin on the outskirt of the facility where they drive back to the Knoxville resistance headquarters. The novel ends with Ember and Chase Lying together on the roof of the resistance's headquarters.

== Inspirations ==
The inspiration for Article 5 came to Kristen Simmons after she saw people protesting against the release of a children's book. She asked herself what else could be banned. She had the idea of the story, wrote it from start to finish, and took about a year to revise it.

== Characters ==
- Ember Miller: A seventeen-year-old girl and the main character of the story that sets out to save her mother from the FBR. It is mentioned that she and Chase have had a romantic relationship when they were younger.
- Chase Jennings: An old neighbor and former romantic interest of Ember's, Chase is now a FBR soldier that goes AWOL to assist Ember and get her to a safe house.
- Sean Banks: A member of the Knoxville Resistance, Sean assists Ember in her attempt to jump over the reformatory wall.
- Beth: One of Ember's friends from childhood.
- Tucker Morris: An evil man who grew up loving the MM, and wanted to be a soldier, and he was finally able to fulfill that, but it changed him into an evil person.
- Rebecca Lansing: Ember's roommate at the reformatory. She is perceived to be a perfect rule follower, but is actually dating Sean Banks, a guard. She is arrested when Ember attempts to blackmail Sean into helping her escape.

== Reception ==
Article 5 received mixed reviews when it came to the plot and the characters, with a reviewer for Tor.com calling it a “provocative, terrifying, frustrating” book, as described by Michael Jones. Wired stated that the book was a fun read but that the enjoyment would depend "on your taste in books and politics".
