= The Declaration (novel) =

2008 novel by Gemma Malley

- First edition
- Author: Gemma Malley
- Language: English
- Series: Declaration Trilogy
- Genre: Dystopian
- Publisher: Bloomsbury Publishing PLC
- Publication date: 5 May 2008
- Pages: 304 pp
- ISBN: 978-0-7475-8774-3
- Followed by: The Resistance, The Legacy

The Declaration is a 2008 dystopian young adult novel written by Gemma Malley. The story is set in the 22nd century, in a world where humanity has cured all illness and seeks eternal life. It is the first installment in The Declaration trilogy. The series continued with The Resistance (2009) and The Legacy (2010).

== Premise ==
Before the events of the novel take place, in the year 2030, a scientist creates 'Longevity,' a drug which prevents death from old age, but does not entirely halt the aging process. The population continues to have children, which quickly leads to overpopulation. As a result, in the year 2065, the Declaration is introduced, which is a document that must be signed before an individual is allowed to take Longevity. In the Declaration, the individual agrees not to have any children. This policy is not strictly upheld, and some wealthy and powerful people have discovered methods to be able to take the drug and still have children.

The population resists the Declaration. Many couples still want to have children, but are unwilling to give up the chance to live indefinitely. Children born to those who have not opted out of the Declaration are referred to as "Surpluses". In some countries, the Surpluses are killed at birth, but in others (such as Britain), they are immediately taken from their parents to live in "Surplus Halls". Children in the Surplus Halls are taught that their existence is wrong, and that the only way they can atone for their parents' crime is through hard and constant labor. Obedient Surpluses can rise through the ranks at Surplus Halls to become "Valuable Assets" to society. Valuable Assets are allowed to work as servants in the homes of Legals (people who are not Surpluses).

== Plot ==
In 2140 England, 15-year-old protagonist Anna has lived in Grange Hall (a Surplus Hall) for most of her life. She was taken from her parents at the age of two. Anna has learned to resent her parents for bringing her into the world illegally, making her a Surplus.

As part of her Pending process (through which she will become a Valuable Asset), Anna is given a work-study in the home of Mrs. Sharpe, a Legal woman who is kind to Anna in a way to which she is not accustomed. Mrs. Sharpe allows Anna to take certain liberties that would usually result in punishment if discovered by the staff at Grange Hall, such as offering Anna lipstick. At the end of the placement, Mrs. Sharpe gives Anna a small diary, in which Anna writes every night. Because journals are forbidden at Grange Hall, Anna has to hide her diary on a secret shelf inside of the girls' bathroom.

As one of Mrs. Pincent's (the House Matron of the Hall) most trusted Prefects, Anna is instructed to assist Peter, a newly-arrived Surplus at Grange Hall. Peter begins to tell Anna stories about the world outside Grange Hall, and calls her "Anna Covey", which he claims is the name given to her by her parents. Peter tells Anna that her parents requested that he be captured so that he might bring her home to them. Anna disregards everything that Peter says, believing him to be a troublemaker.

After Anna is badly beaten by Mrs. Pincent, Peter begins to convince Anna of his convictions. Anna overhears Mrs. Pincent referring to her as 'brainwashed' and realizes that the House Matron does not see her as a Valuable Asset. In the same conversation, Anna learns of a plot to kill Peter, who has been having difficulty settling into Grange Hall. Anna purposely misbehaves in order to be put into Solitary (short for solitary confinement, a punishment in the Grange Hall) so that she may communicate with Peter. The two form the plan to escape through a tunnel.

After a narrow escape, the children run from Grange Hall, then seek shelter in Mrs. Sharpe's garden shed. Mrs. Sharpe is frightened to discover Anna and Peter, but reluctantly harbors them and feigns ignorance when a search party comes to her door. Mrs. Sharpe helps smuggle Anna and Peter out of the village and drives them to the outskirts of London. Later, however, she is pressured into giving their whereabouts to the Catchers (a group tasked with capturing runaway Surpluses).

Upon arrival at her parents' house in Bloomsbury, Anna realizes that Peter has been truthful. Anna's parents have longed for her return. Anna also discovers that she has an infant brother named Ben. She is overwhelmed with love for her family, which contrasts against her upbringing in the frigid sterility of Grange Hall.

The Catchers arrive at the Coveys' home, when the children are discovered hiding beneath the floorboards. Because of a clause in The Declaration which states that if a Surplus loses a parent they become a Legal, Anna's parents decide to commit suicide. Neither Ben nor Anna can be classified as a Surplus.

Shortly afterward, Peter is informed by his grandfather (Richard Pincent) that his father has been killed by his mother, Margaret Pincent (the House Matron of Grange Hall), and that he is now also a Legal.

In the book's conclusion, Peter and Anna live together in her parents’ house. They decide to raise Ben, Anna's brother, as their own child. They begin their lives as Legals.

== Major characters ==
- Anna Covey – Anna is the Surplus protagonist of the first book in the series. She was discovered by Catchers around the age of 2 and has lived in Grange Hall ever since. She is a Pending (a soon-to-become Valuable Asset to the society) and thus belongs to the oldest group of Surpluses ("Educated") at Grange Hall. Anna is indoctrinated to believe that her parents are evil and that she must be punished for their crimes. When Peter arrives, she learns that her last name is "Covey" (beforehand she is simply referred to as "Surplus Anna").
- Peter Bunting/Pincent – Peter arrives at Grange Hall at the age of a Pending. He is disobedient and strongly believes that Surpluses deserve better treatment. He claims he was sent to Grange Hall by Anna's parents to rescue her. When he was a child, Peter was found by members of the Underground Movement (a resistance party).
- Margaret Pincent – Mrs. Pincent is the House Matron of Grange Hall. She is a described as a bitter and cruel woman. She is also the daughter of the chairman of the biggest Longevity drug company. During the course of the novel, it is revealed that she is Peter's mother, but she believed him to be dead.
- Sheila – Sheila is Anna's companion, another Surplus at Grange Hall. She believes that she belongs in the Outside world, as her parents were Opt Outs (those who didn't take the Longevity drug) and she is thereby a Legal. Later in the novel, Sheila aids in the capture of Anna and Peter.
- Julia Sharpe – Mrs. Sharpe is a Legal who lives in the village close to Grange Hall. Mrs. Sharpe shows Anna kindness during her Work Study, and later helps Anna and Peter hide from the Catchers.
- Anna's parents

== Reception ==
Diane Samuels of The Guardian criticized the book's writing, describing it as "prosaic" and "resorting to passages that tell the reader how it is rather than allowing the characters to live and breathe." Samuels found The Declaration emotionally shallow and politically simplistic, saying: "More complexity is needed to grapple meaningfully with the psychological impact of such a profound alienation between adults and children." Nicolette Jones, writing in the Sunday Times, described the book as "[a] fine debut" and "convincing."

The series is part of a larger trend of dystopian young adult literature, and has attracted some scholarly attention. Susan Louise Stewart identifies a broad theme of futuristic Holocausts, drawing parallels from Malley's books to Lois Lowry's The Giver, Neal Shusterman's Unwind, and Suzanne Collins's The Hunger Games. Jennifer Ford identifies a similar theme of overpopulation motifs in young adult books, including the Declaration trilogy.
