= The Merge =

2025 novel by Grace Walker

- Author: Grace Walker
- Published: 2025
- Publisher: Oneworld Publications

The Merge is a 2025 dystopian novel by English author Grace Walker.

== Publication history ==
The UK and Commonwealth publications rights for the novel were acquired by Oneworld Publications in early 2025.

== Reception ==
Kirkus Reviews reviewed the novel as "excellent addition to the growing catalog of 21st-century dystopian nightmares," saying that it was "a taut thriller." Alex Good of the Toronto Star reviewed the novel as "a solid debut," saying that it had "a slow build... into psychological thriller territory and ends up taking the reader for quite a ride." Publishers Weekly wrote that "Walker effectively blends climate dystopia and body horror, especially in the novel’s chilling final twist. Readers of The Great Transition by Nick Fuller Googins will enjoy this." Lisa Tuttle of The Guardian wrote that it was a "compelling and disturbing story of love and sacrifice, control and resistance."
