= The Envy Chronicles =

The Envy Chronicles is a series of paranormal romance novels by Joss Ware and published by Harper-Collins. The series is set in a dystopian world, fifty years after mass destruction of the human race.

== Setting ==
On June 10, 2010, the earth was encumbered by violent earthquakes, raging storms, towering tsunamis, and other natural disasters. The result of the devastating events was an earth shifted on its axis and a decimation of the bulk of the population.

The series takes place fifty years after what is called The Change, and revolves around a group of men who time traveled through a cave in Sedona to this changed world. Each novel in the series highlights one of the men, each of whom emerged from the mystical cave with an extraordinary power.

== The Envy Chronicles ==
The books:

- Beyond the Night (January 2010)
- Embrace the Night Eternal (February 2010)
- Abandon the Night (March 2010)
- Night Betrayed (February 2011)
- Night Forbidden (September 2011)
- Night Resurrected (May 2016)
