= The Office of Mercy =

2013 novel by Ariel Djanikian

- Author: Ariel Djanikian
- Language: English
- Genre: Science fiction
- Published: February 21, 2013
- Publisher: Penguin Books
- Publication place: United States
- Pages: 320

The Office of Mercy is a 2013 dystopian science fiction novel written by Ariel Djanikian.

== Plot summary ==
A post-apocalyptic America is left peopled by those who inhabit emotionally controlled high-tech underground settlements such as America-Five, and wild, emotionally fierce people of the Tribes. Natasha Wiley works in America-Five's Department of Mercy, where she tracks tribespeople above ground for extermination or "mercy".

== Reception ==
In a review for NPR, Michael Schaub gave the book a positive review, with particular emphasis on the quality of the premise and main character. He went on to state that "Djanikian proves to be expert at both narrative pacing and crafting prose". Kirkus Reviews also gave it a positive review, stating that it is "both believable and chilling", and would leave readers hoping for a sequel. Publishers Weekly was largely positive, describing it as thoughtful and intriguing. However, they also stated that it was "more cerebral than emotionally satisfying", which may result in some readers finding fault in its premise.
