= Under the Never Sky =

2012 young adult science fiction novel by Veronica Rossi

- Cover of the First Edition
- Author: Veronica Rossi
- Language: English
- Genre: Young adult, Romance, Science fiction, dystopian
- Publisher: HarperCollins
- Publication date: January 3, 2012
- Publication place: United States
- Media type: Print (hardback)
- Pages: 374
- ISBN: 978-0-06-207203-0
- Followed by: Through the Ever Night

Under the Never Sky is a 2012 young adult debut novel by Veronica Rossi and, the novel is the first in the Under the Never Sky series. The book follows two teens, a girl that has always lived within a protected city and a boy who is both a Night Seer and a Scire, as they attempt to survive.

Film rights to the trilogy have been optioned by Warner Brothers Studios, with the novel being sold in more than 25 international markets.

== Plot ==
In a futuristic world, Earth's atmosphere is plagued by the Aether, potent electrical currents that scorch the planet during storms. Survivors have divided into opposing groups: Dwellers live in highly advanced Pods, they have eradicated disease, bypassed aging, and experience everything through a virtual reality called the Realms. They access the Realms through Smarteyes, transparent devices attached to their skin. Outsiders live in Tribes under the open sky, they have adapted to survive the Aether storms. Some possess enhanced Senses, known as the Marked.

Aria, a teen Dweller from the Reverie Pod, lives primarily in the Realms. Her only family is her mother, Lumina, a scientist conducting top-secret research in the Bliss Pod. Communication with Bliss is severed, sparking Aria's worry. Perry, an Outsider Marked with enhanced scent and sight, belongs to the Tide tribe. He aims to steal medication from Reverie to treat his ailing nephew, Talon. His brother, Vale, wants to maintain their valley home, while Perry advocates for finding new land. In a breached dome at Reverie, Aria witnesses Soren's madness.

Perry saves her, retrieving an apple and her Smarteye. Aria's Smarteye contains a message from Lumina addressed to Songbird. Aria awakens in an infirmary, accused of starting the fire. Consul Hess arranges her transport to Bliss but abandons her in the Death Shop, a dangerous area rumored to be inhabited by savages and cannibals. Back at the Tides, Vale allows Perry to take Talon hunting. Dwellers arrive and demand Aria's Smarteye. Perry fights them, protecting the device but losing Talon. He deserts the Tides to rescue him. Aria traverses the Outside, seeking a Pod. She meets Perry during an Aether storm, who helps her find shelter. They decide to travel together, seeking help from Perry's friend, Marron.

Perry crafts shoes for Aria using old book covers. They bond along their journey, with Aria sharing her experiences in the Pods while Perry remains silent. They encounter Croven cannibals and Perry kills them. Aria's negative reaction prompts Perry to question his purpose. Roar, an Outsider with enhanced hearing, joins their journey. He informs Perry that Liv, his sister, has escaped an arranged marriage. Roar also brings a mysterious boy named Cinder, who can control the Aether.

Aria, shut out of the Realms by Consul Hess, watches as Perry is chosen in her place to embark on a mission into a research Realm. Lumina's absence weighs heavily on their minds. In the depths of the Realm, Perry stumbles upon a series of testing rooms. There, he encounters Talon, who expresses a desire to remain in Reverie, away from his illness. Talon's mention of Vale being with him awakens a spark of surprise within Perry. Amidst the confusion, Perry grasps the chilling realization that Vale may have attempted to rescue Talon, only to be captured by the Dwellers. With Vale missing, the Tides are left in need of a Blood Lord, and Perry resolves to take on the mantle upon his return. However, before fulfilling his duty, he vows to honor his pledge to reunite Aria with her mother in Bliss.

Meanwhile, outside Delphi, a menacing horde of Croven gathers. Perry and Aria strategize their escape, planning to depart during an Aether storm when the Croven will seek shelter. As they prepare, Roar instructs Aria in the art of knife fighting, while Cinder stealthily ventures outside the compound. Perry and Aria seize their chance to flee, aided by Roar and Marron's men. The Croven ambush, slaying Marron's men and injuring Roar. In a desperate moment, Cinder swoops in, incinerating the Croven with an ethereal blast. As Perry and Aria continue their journey to Bliss, wolves pursue them relentless. Aria, demonstrating her bond with nature, calms the predators with her perfect imitation of their howls. Along their path, Perry and Aria acknowledge the undeniable feelings they hold for each other.

Upon arriving at Bliss, they discover that the facility is evacuating. Aria infiltrates the central Pod, where she encounters Dr. Ward. He reveals Lumina's lifeless body and leads her to Consul Hess, who extracts a ruthless bargain from her. In exchange for Talon's life, Aria must locate the mythical Still Blue, an elusive haven with clear skies, untouched by the Aether. Consul Hess intends to transplant Reverie's inhabitants there. When Aria fails to return from Bliss, Perry concludes that she has reunited with her mother and chosen to remain with her. Despondent, Perry encounters a group of Outsiders in the forest, indulging in Luster and provoking a confrontation with their leader, Reef. His victory over Reef earns him the group's allegiance. They accompany Perry back to the Tides, where Vale still lingers.

Perry uncovers Vale's treachery, learning that he sold Talon to the Dwellers for food to sustain the tribe. Vale's plan extended to having Perry killed in the chaos of Talon's capture. Refusing to submit, Perry engages in a duel with Vale for the title of Blood Lord. Vale's refusal to pledge loyalty leaves Perry no choice but to vanquish his brother.

Aria returns to Delphi, where she finds Roar and Cinder waiting. Roar and Cinder resolve to join Perry at the Tides come spring, and Aria entrusts them with a violet—a flower that Perry associates with her scent. Soon after, Aria embarks on her solitary quest to seek the Still Blue. One night, as she sits by a fire, she hears the familiar sound of Perry's footsteps approaching. The long-lost lovers are reunited at last.

== Characters ==
- Aria Kittredge: A seventeen-year-old "dweller" who is banished from her home and sent out into the outside world.
- Peregrine "Perry" Murine: An eighteen-year-old boy who lives in one of the tribes that inhabit the outside world.
- Roar Smith: Also a member of Perry's tribe as well as his best friend. Was in a relationship with Olivia before she left.
- Olivia "Liv" Murine : Perry's sister, is in a relationship with Roar before she is married off to the leader of another tribe in return for food.
- Cinder: A young boy from Perry's tribe who has a mysterious connection to Aria.

== Reception ==
Critical reception for Under the Never Sky has been positive. Common elements of the novel that received praise were the novel's "hopeful ending" and "smooth prose".

== Sequels ==
"Through The Ever Night" is the sequel to this book and the second installment in the series.

"Into The Still Blue" is the third installment of the series.

== Spin-offs ==
Rossi has also written two other Under the Never Sky stories, Roar and Liv and Brooke, both focused on the respective characters mentioned in their titles and further developing those characters.

== Adaptations ==
Rossi posted in March 2016 to her facebook fan page that a "terrific production company" has the rights to a film adaptation of the book and is working on a script.
