= Across the Universe (novel series) =

2011 novel by Beth Revis

- First edition
- Author: Beth Revis
- Language: English
- Genre: Science fiction Young adult Murder mystery Dystopian romance
- Publisher: Razorbill
- Publication place: United States
- Media type: Print (Hardcover, Paperback), Audiobook

Across the Universe is a trilogy of young adult science fiction romance novels written by American author Beth Revis. Chronicling the life of Amy Martin aboard a generation ship hundreds of years in the future, Across the Universe, the first novel published in 2011 by Razorbill, received a starred Kirkus review and made the New York Bestseller List for Children's Chapter Books.

== Plot summary ==
Hundreds of years in the future, the spaceship Godspeed travels toward a distant, earth-like planet with 100 cryogenically frozen settlers on board. Seventeen year old Amy, frozen along with her parents, wakes early and only to find herself in the middle of a strange, regimented society made up of those born on the ship over generations. With the help of Elder, the ship's only teenager and future leader, she must solve a murder mystery, and save the ship. They must hurry before the murderer kills any more people, and before time runs out of life.

== Books in this universe ==
- Across the Universe (2011)
- A Million Suns (2012)
- Shades of Earth (2013)
- The Body Electric (2014)

The first three books in the series make up the original trilogy, published by Penguin Books. The fourth book is a standalone novel set in the same universe, and was self-published by Revis.

=== Short Fiction in this universe ===
- The Other Elder
- Love is a Choice
- Night Swimming
- As They Slip Away

Revis has also written short fiction that takes place in the universe of her trilogy, including As They Slip Away, a novella available as a free download from Penguin Teen, as well as short stories in the anthologies After (edited by Ellen Datlow and Terri Windling), which includes The other Elder; Shards and Ashes (edited by Melissa Marr and Kelley Armstrong), which includes Love is a choice; and Defy the Dark (edited by Sandra Mitchell).

== Reception ==
Across the Universe debuted on the New York Times Bestseller List for Children's Chapter Books at #7 in January 2011, and received a Kirkus starred review. It was long-listed for the Carnegie Medal, and chosen as a YALSA Teens Top Ten book for 2012.

The sequel, A Million Suns, debuted on the bestseller list at #10. It was named a Best Teen Book of the Year by Kirkus Reviews.

When the final book in the series, Shades of Earth, received more pre-orders than the previous two books combined, Revis' publisher launched a copy of Across the Universe into space.
