= Beth Revis =

American novelist

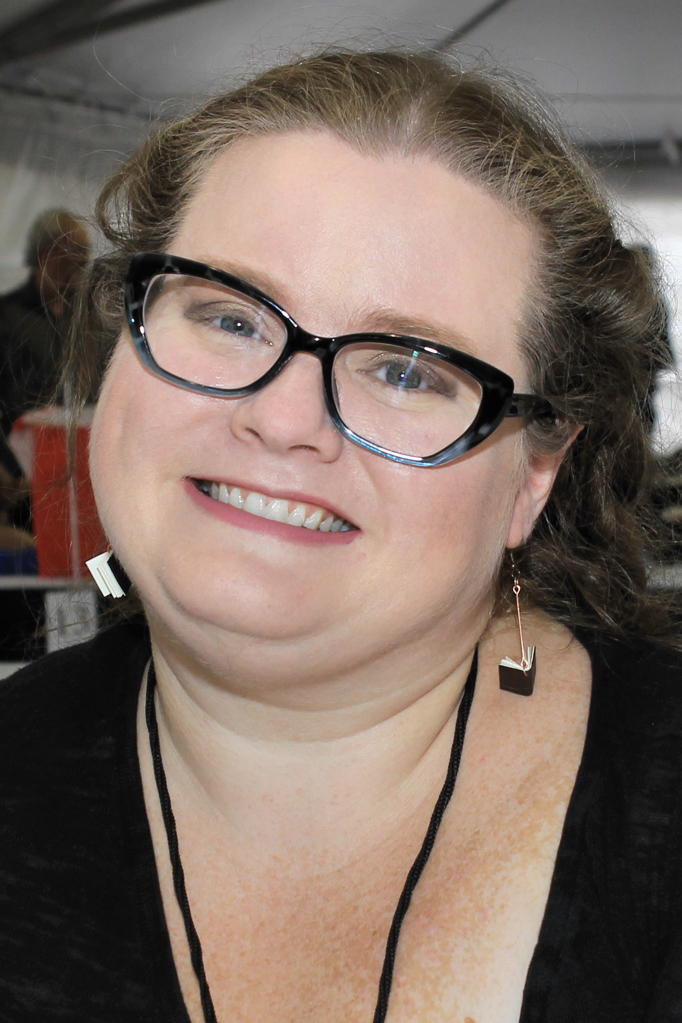
- Revis at the 2016 Texas Book Festival
- Born: North Carolina, US
- Occupations: Writer, former English teacher
- Writing career
- Period: 2011–present
- Genre: Young adult
- Website: www.bethrevis.com

Beth Revis is an American author of fantasy and science fiction, mainly for the young adult audience. She is best known for the Across the Universe trilogy, which consists of the novels Across the Universe, A Million Suns and Shades of Earth. Revis resides in North Carolina.

== Publications ==
Revis' first published novel was Across the Universe, which debuted on the New York Times Bestseller List for Children's Chapter Books at #7 in January 2011. There have been two sequels to the book: A Million Suns (January 2012) and Shades of Earth (January 2013), as well as a standalone novel set in the same universe, The Body Electric (2014).

She has also written short stories in the same universe that appear in After, edited by Ellen Datlow and Terri Windling, and Shards and Ashes, edited by Melissa Marr and Kelley Armstrong.

In 2015, Revis published a series of books on writing and publishing, called the Paper Hearts series. The series began as a collection of informational essays and comments in response to questions aspiring writers had, which she had originally posted on Wattpad. When it gained immense popularity, Revis rewrote the collection into three separate books: Volume 1: Some Writing Advice, Volume 2: Some Publishing Advice, and Volume 3: Some Marketing Advice.

In July, 2016 Revis's second standalone novel, A World Without You, was published by Razorbill.

Her work has also been featured in various young adult anthologies and compilations.

== Published works ==
=== Young adult fiction ===
==== Across the Universe series ====
- Across the Universe (2011)
- A Million Suns (2012)
- Shades of Earth (2013)

==== Also in the Across the Universe world ====
- As They Slip Away (novella)
- The Other Elder (short story)
- Love is a Choice (short story)
- Night Swimming (short story)
- The Body Electric (2014)

==== Standalone works ====
- The Body Electric (2014)
- Violent Ends (2015) (with 16 other authors)
- A World Without You (2016)
- Blood and Feathers (2022)

=== Fiction ===
==== Star Wars Universe ====
- Rebel Rising (2017)
- "Fully Operational" (short story, 2017) published in Star Wars: From a Certain Point of View (2017)
- "For The Last Time" (short story, 2020) published in Star Wars: From a Certain Point of View: The Empire Strikes Back (2020)
- The Princess and the Scoundrel (2022)
- Someone Who Loves You (2024)

==== Chaotic Orbits (novella series) ====
- Full Speed to a Crash Landing (2024)
- How to Steal a Galaxy (2024)
- Last Chance to Save the World (2025)

=== Anthologies/Short Story Collections ===
==== The Future Collection (2015) ====
- "Doctor-Patient Confidentiality"
- "The Most Precious Memory"
- "The Girl and the Machine"
- "Lag"
- "The Turing Test"
- "As They Slip Away"

==== Anthologies ====
- After: Nineteen Stories of Apocalypse and Dystopia (edited by Ellen Datlow and Terri Windling) (2012)
- Shards and Ashes (edited by Melissa Marr and Kelly Armstrong) (2013)
- Defy the Dark (edited by Saundra Mitchell) (2013)
- Dead Man's Hand: An Anthology of the Weird West (edited by John Joseph Adams) (2014)
- Soothe the Savage Beast (edited by Bryan Young) (2014)
- Futuredaze: Reprise (2014)
- Violent Ends (edited by Shaun David Hutchinson) (2015)
- Among The Shadows: 13 Stories of Darkness & Light (edited by Kate Karyus Quinn) (2015)
- A Tyranny of Petticoats: 15 Stories of Belles, Bank Robbers & Other Badass Girls (edited by Jessica Spotswood) (2016)

=== Nonfiction ===
==== Paper Hearts series (2015) ====
- Paper Hearts, Volume 1: Some Writing Advice
- Paper Hearts, Volume 2: Some Publishing Advice
- Paper Hearts, Volume 3: Some Marketing Advice
