= Lauren DeStefano =

American novelist (born 1984)

- Born: October 13, 1984 (age 41); New Haven, Connecticut, U.S.
- Education: Albertus Magnus College
- Occupation: Writer
- Writing career
- Period: 21st century
- Genre: Utopian and dystopian fiction
- Notable work: Wither
- Literary movement: Young adult
- Website: www.laurendestefano.com

Lauren DeStefano (born October 13, 1984) is an American young adult author. She is best known for the Chemical Garden series of novels and her gallows humor.

== Biography ==
DeStefano was born in New Haven, Connecticut, and has an English degree from Albertus Magnus College. Her first book, Wither, a dystopian young adult novel, was published in 2011 by Simon & Schuster.

Wither is the first book in The Chemical Garden Trilogy, and the second novel, Fever, debuted at No. 6 on the New York Times bestseller list in March 2012. The third and final book, Sever, was released on February 12, 2013. The trilogy achieved No. 10 on the New York Times bestseller list for children's series in March 2013.

DeStefano is currently working on a new series. She has a three-book deal with Simon & Schuster for a "utopian" young adult series called The Internment Chronicles. The first book is titled Perfect Ruin. It was released October 1, 2013, and focuses on the "perfect, orderly society" of a city floating in the sky. The second book in the series, Burning Kingdoms, was released on March 10, 2015. DeStefano also wrote a middle-grade book, A Curious Tale of the In-Between, which is scheduled for release in September 2015.

== Novels ==
The Chemical Garden Trilogy

- Wither (The Chemical Garden. Book 1, 2011)
- The Seeds of Wither (The Chemical Garden. Short story #1.5. 2011)
- Fever (The Chemical Garden. Book 2. 2012)
- Sever (The Chemical Garden. Book 3. 2013)

The Internment Chronicles

- Perfect Ruin (Book 1. October 1, 2013)
- No Intention of Dying (Short story #1.5. December 9, 2014)
- Burning Kingdoms (Book 2. March 10, 2015)
- The Heir Apparent (Short story #2.5. April 7, 2015)
- Broken Crowns (Book 3. March 22, 2016)

The Glass Spare Duology

- The Glass Spare (October 24, 2017)
- The Warrior Constellation (Short story #0.5. October 12, 2018)
- The Cursed Sea (December 18, 2018)

Other Work

- A Curious Tale of the In-Between (September 1, 2015)
- The Peculiar Night of the Blue Heart (September 13, 2016)
- The Girl with the Ghost Machine (June 6, 2017)
- Dreaming Dangerous (July 3, 2018)
- The Unicorn Came to Dinner (August 11, 2020)
