= Kristen Simmons =

American novelist

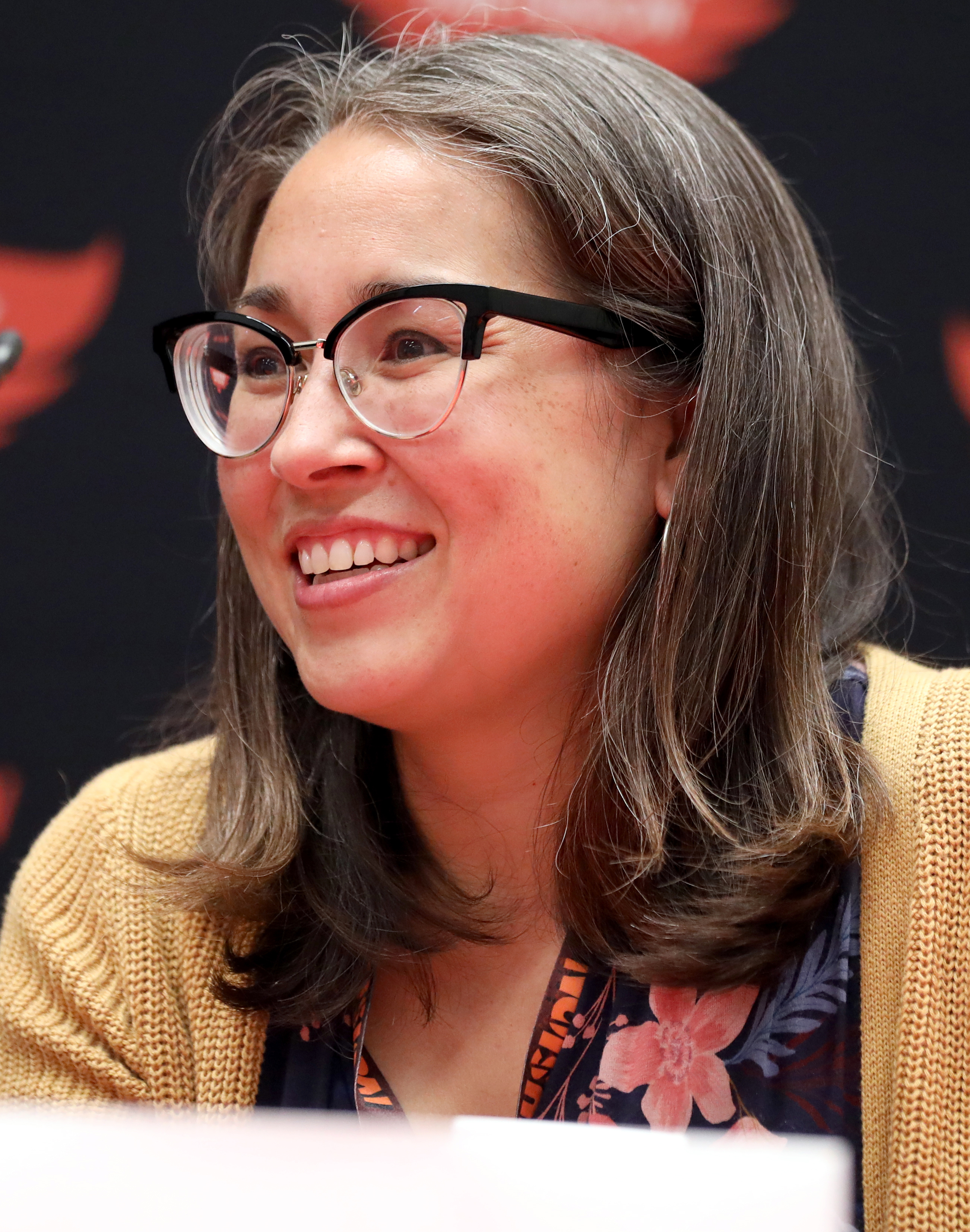
- Simmons in 2024
- Born: June 5, 1984 (age 42); Cincinnati, Ohio, U.S.
- Occupation: Novelist
- Writing career
- Genres: young adult, dystopian
- Notable work: Article 5 trilogy
- Website: www.kristensimmonsbooks.com

Kristen Simmons (born June 5, 1984) is an author of young adult fiction. Her first published novel was Article 5, a dystopian novel about an America controlled by the "Moral Militia." Article 5 has been followed by two sequels: Breaking Point and Three.

== Bibliography ==
=== Article 5 ===
- Article 5 (2012)
- Breaking Point (2013)
- Three (2014)

=== Vale Hall ===
- The Deceivers, (2019)
- Scammed, (2020)
- Payback, (2021)

=== Set Fire to the Gods (with Sara Raasch) ===
- Set Fire to the Gods (2020)
- Rise Up from the Embers (2021)

=== Other books ===
- The Glass Arrow, (2015)
- Metaltown, (2017)
  - "Burned Away" (short story set in Metaltown) (2016)
- Pacifica (2018)
- Find Him Where You Left Him Dead (2023)
