= Reboot (novel) =

Young adult dystopian novel

- First edition
- Author: Amy Tintera
- Language: English
- Genre: Young adult novel, dystopian fiction, romance novel
- Published: 2013 (Harper Teen)
- Publication place: USA
- Media type: Print (hardback, paperback)
- Pages: 365
- ISBN: 9780062217073
- OCLC: 813912001

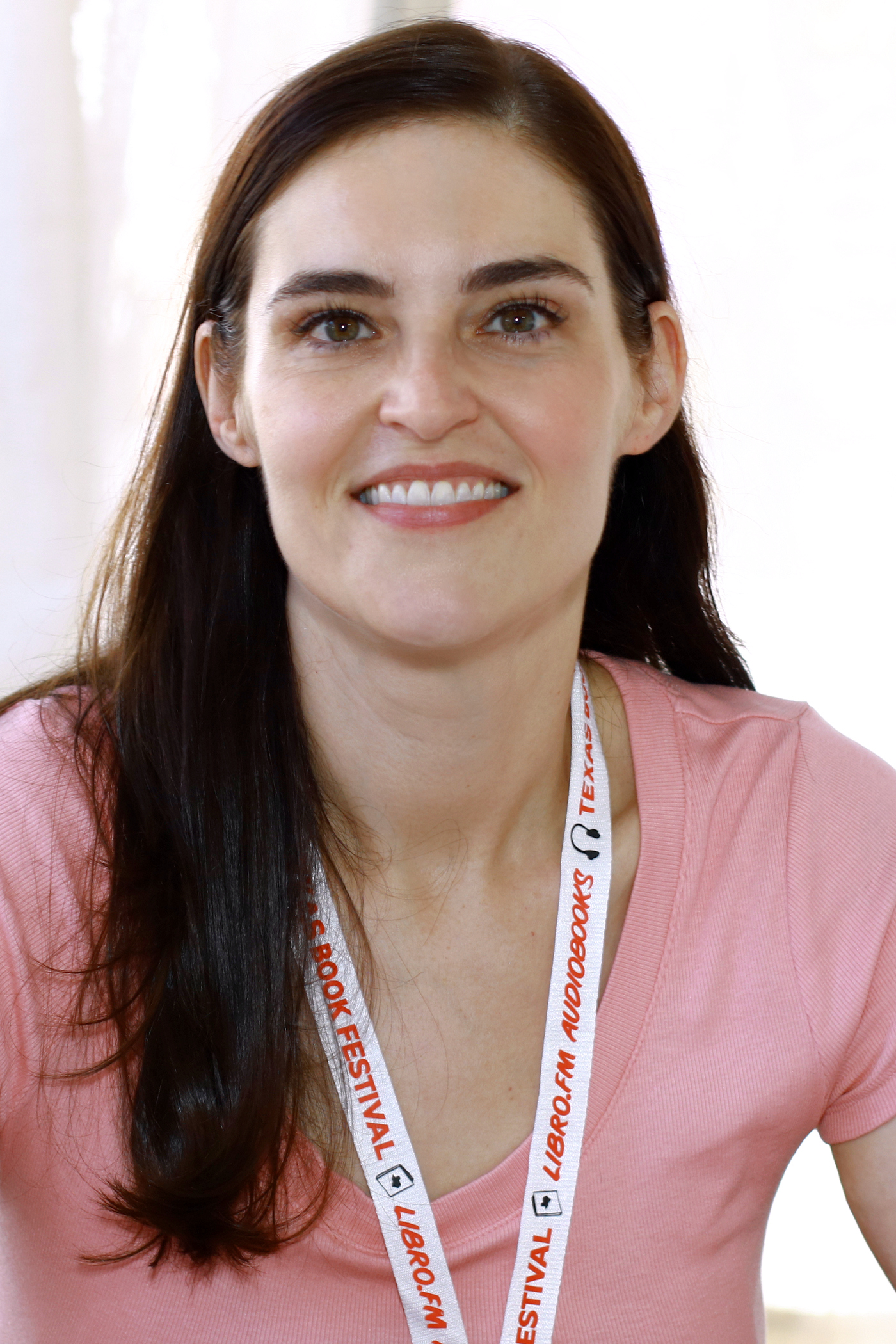
Author Amy Tintera

Reboot is a 2013 young adult novel by Amy Tintera. It is a post-apocalytic story about Wren, a reboot (a person who has been brought back to life as a super strong unfeeling hunter and killer of criminals) who attempts to escape her situation.

== Reception ==
A review in Kirkus Reviews of Reboot wrote "Though undeniably derivative of so many in the genre, this is a well-imagined story in its own right."

Reboot has also been reviewed by Common Sense Media, Publishers Weekly, The Bulletin of the Center for Children's Books, School Library Journal, Booklist, Horn Book Guides, Library Media Connection and Voice of Youth Advocates magazine.
