= Walter Besant =

English novelist and historian (1836–1901)

Sir Walter Besant
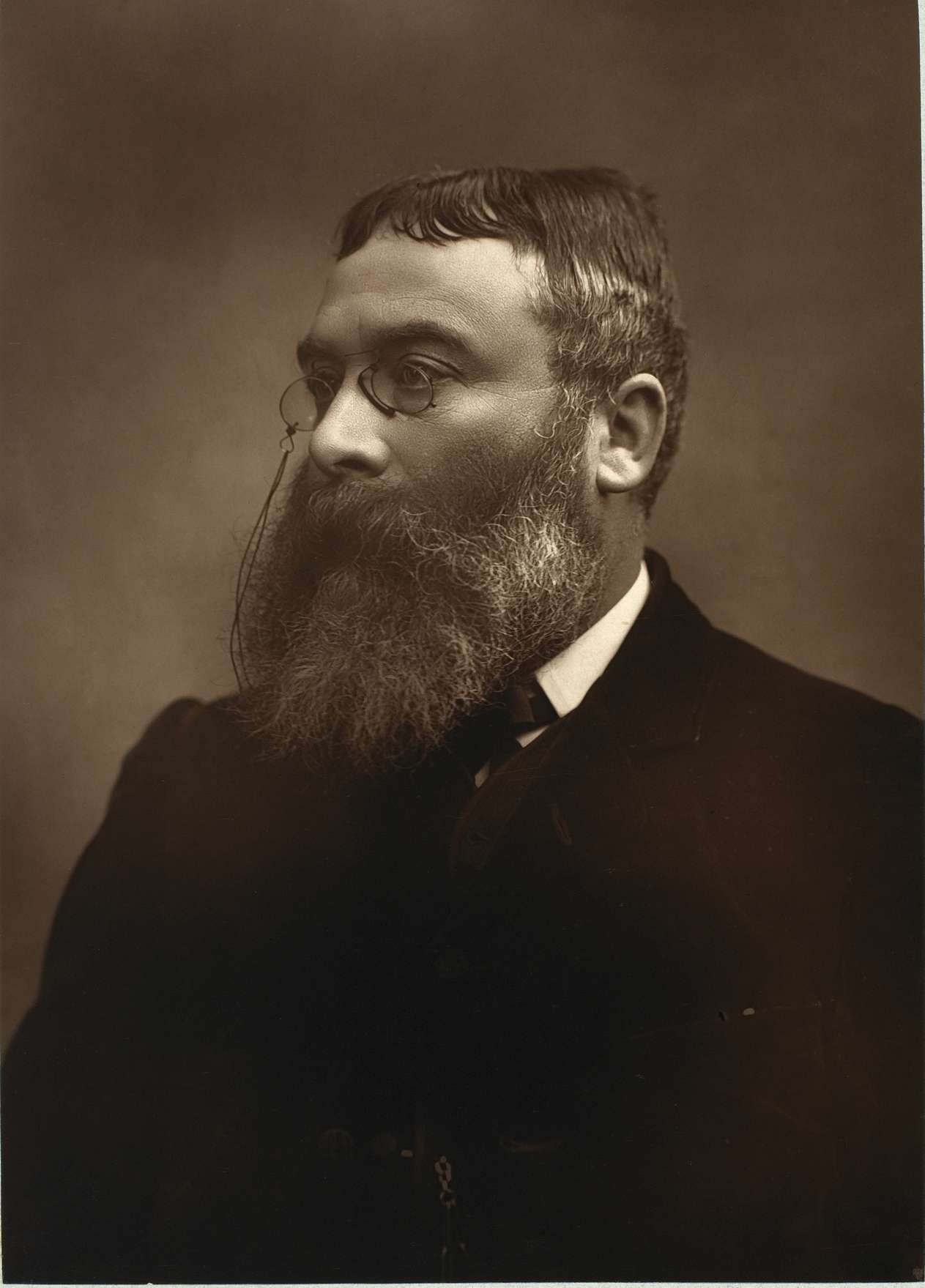
- Besant by 1888
- Born: 14 August 1836; Portsmouth, Hampshire, England
- Died: 9 June 1901 (aged 64); Frognal, London, England
- Occupations: Novelist, historian
- Relatives: William Henry Besant; Annie Besant

Sir Walter Besant (/ˈbɛzənt/; 14 August 1836 – 9 June 1901) was an English novelist and historian. He was a founder of the Society of Authors.

== Early life and education ==
The son of wine merchant William Besant (1800–1879), he was born at Portsmouth, Hampshire and attended school at St Paul's, Southsea, Stockwell Grammar, London and King's College London. In 1855, he was admitted as a pensioner to Christ's College, Cambridge, where he graduated in 1859 as 18th wrangler.

After a year as Mathematical Master at Rossall School, Fleetwood, Lancashire, and a year at Leamington College, Besant spent six years as professor of mathematics at the Royal College, British Mauritius. A decline in health compelled him to resign, and he returned to England and settled in London in 1867. From 1868 to 1885, he held the position of Secretary to the Palestine Exploration Fund. In 1871, he was admitted to Lincoln's Inn.

In 1874, Besant married Mary Garrett (née Foster Barham), daughter of Eustace Foster-Barham, of Bridgwater, with whom he had four children. For some time he took care of his sister-in-law Annie Besant, a prominent women's rights activist, socialist, and theosophist.

== Career ==
In 1868 he published Studies in French Poetry. Three years later he began his collaboration with writer James Rice. Among their joint productions are Ready-money Mortiboy (1872), and The Golden Butterfly (1876), both, especially the latter, very successful. This association was ended by the death of Rice in 1882.

Thereafter, Besant continued to write voluminously by himself, his main novels being All in a Garden Fair set in Hainault Forest in Essex. Rudyard Kipling credited the book in Something of Myself with inspiring him to leave India and make a career as a writer, and which George Gissing read with 'extreme delight', calling it 'one of the most charming and delicate of modern novels,

Then followed Dorothy Forster (his own favorite), Children of Gibeon, and All Sorts and Conditions of Men. The two last belonged to a series in which he endeavoured to arouse the public conscience to the hardship among the poorest classes of cities. In this crusade Besant had considerable success, the establishment of The People's Palace in the East of London being one result. His 1889 novel The Bell of St. Paul's was considered by his contemporary author George Gissing to be an 'absurd and empty book'.

Harper's New Monthly Magazine published ten of his works of fiction, including "All Sorts and Conditions of Men; an Impossible Story," which is famous for having suggested the founding of the People's Palace, London.

In addition to his fiction, Besant wrote largely on the history and topography of London. His plans for this topic were left unfinished: among his books on this subject is London in the 18th Century. From 1879 Besant was the joint editor of The New Plutarch book series published by Marcus Ward & Co. and G. P. Putnam's Sons.

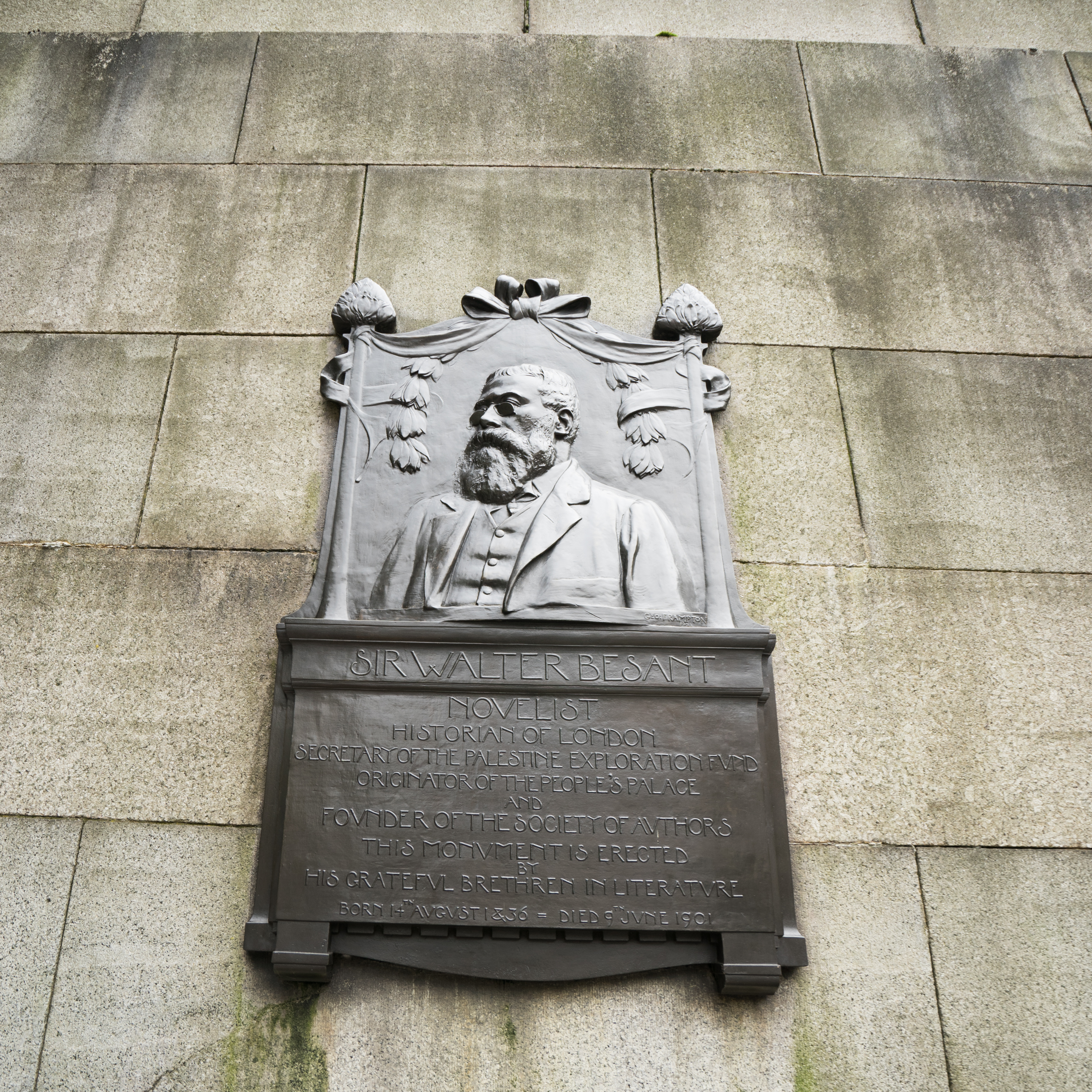
Sir Walter Besant memorial near the Waterloo Bridge

Besant was a freemason, joining the Lodge of Harmony in Mauritius in 1862. He became Master of Marquis of Dalhousie Lodge, London in 1873, having joined in 1869. He was one of the founders of the first Masonic research lodge, Quatuor Coronati Lodge No 2076, of which he was the first treasurer from 1886. He was also one of the founders and first chair of the Society of Authors in 1884. He was knighted in the 1895 Birthday Honours as a Knight Bachelor.

Besant was treasurer of the "Atlantic Union", an association which sought to improve social relations between Britons and Americans. In 1896, he published an article in the North American Review advocating the creation of a "United Federation of States" to unify the Anglosphere under a federal system; he cited the "restlessness" of the Anglo-Saxon people and the existing achievements of the United States and the British Empire in claiming that the Federation "would be the greatest, the richest, the most powerful empire, republic or state that history has ever recorded."

== Death ==
He died in Frognal in Hampstead, London on 9 June 1901, aged 64.

In 1903, the Society of Authors erected at St. Paul's a plaque to Besant by George Frampton. The inscription reads: "Sir Walter Besant, novelist, historian of London, secretary of the Palestine exploration fund, originator of the people's palace and founder of the Society of Authors. This monument is erected by his grateful brethren in literature. Born August 14, 1836. Died June, 1901."

== Memorial ==
There is a monument to Besant in the crypt at St Paul's Cathedral, with another copy of the memorial present on the Victoria Embankment.

== Works ==
The following is a select list. A further list of Besant's works may be found here.

=== Fiction ===
- The Alabaster Box. 1900.
- Alfred. 3rd ed. 1899.
- All in a Garden Fair. 3 vols. 1883. 1891 edition at the Internet Archive
- All Sorts and Conditions of Men. 3 vols. 1882. 1890 edition at the Internet Archive
- Armorel of Lyonesse. 3 vols. 1890. 1907 edition at the Internet Archive
- The Bell of St. Paul's. 3 vols. 1889.
- Beyond the Dreams of Avarice. 1895.
- Blind Love. By Wilkie Collins, completed and with preface by W. Besant. 3 vols. 1890.
- By Celia's Arbour: A Tale of Portsmouth Town. With James Rice. Reprinted from The Graphic. 3 vols. 1878.
- The Captains' Room etc.. 3 vols.
- The Case of Mr. Lucraft and other tales. By the authors of Ready Money Mortiboy (with James Rice). 2 vols. 1876.
- The Changeling. 1898.
- The Chaplain of the Fleet. With James Rice 3 vols. 1881. 1887 edition at the Internet Archive
- Children of Gibeon. 2nd ed. 3 vols. 1886.
- The City of Refuge. 3 vols. 1896. 1899 edition at the Internet Archive
- Dorothy Forster. 3 vols. 1884. 1891 edition at the Internet Archive
- Doubts of Dives. [Speculative fiction in which a rich and poor man exchange bodies].
- A Five Years' Tryst and other stories. 1902.
- For Britain's Soldiers. By W.L. Alden, Sir W. Besant etc., with preface by C.J.C. Hyne. 1900.
- For Faith and Freedom. 3 vols. 1889. 1891 edition at the Internet Archive
- The History of London, 1894.
- A Fountain Sealed. 1897.
- The Fourth Generation. 1900.
- The Golden Butterfly. With James Rice. 3 vols. 1876. 1887 edition at the Internet Archive
- Herr Paulus. 3 vols. 1888. 1890 edition at the Internet Archive
- The Holy Rose &c. 1890.
- In Deacon's Orders &c. 1895.
- The Inner House. 1888. [Dystopian fiction about a society that has discovered immortality]
- The Ivory Gate. 3 vols. 1893. 1894 edition at the Internet Archive
- The Lady of Lynn. 1901.
- The Master Craftsman. 2 vols. 1896.
- The Monks of Thelema. With James Rice. 3 vols. 1878. 1884 edition at the Internet Archive
- My Little Girl. By the authors of Ready-money Mortiboy. With James Rice. 3 vols. 1873.
- No Other Way. 1902.
- The Orange Girl. 1899.
- Ready-Money Mortiboy. Repr. from Once a Week. With James Rice. 3 vols. London: Tinsley, Brothers, 1872. Repr. of 1885 ed. Bath, 1974. 1890 edition at the Internet Archive
- The Rebel Queen. 3 vols. 1893.
- The Revolt of Man. 1882. [Speculative fiction: traditional roles of sexes are reversed].
- St. Katherine's by the Tower. 3 vols. 1891.
- The Seamy Side. With James Rice. 3 vols. 2nd. ed. 1880. 1881 edition at the Internet Archive
- The Ten Years' Tenant and other stories. With James Rice. 3 vols.
- This Son of Vulcan. By the authors of Ready-Money Mortiboy. With James Rice. 3 vols. 1876.
- To Call Her Mine &c. 1889.
- "Twas in Trafalgar's Bay" and other stories. With James Rice. 2nd ed. 1879.
- Uncle Jack &c. 1885. 1887 edition at the Internet Archive
- Verbena, Camellia, Stephanotis, &c. 1892.
- When George the Third was King, London: Sampson Low, 1872.
- With Harp and Crown. By the authors of "Ready-Money Mortiboy." With James Rice. 3 vols. 1875. 1890 edition at the Internet Archive
- The World Went Very Well Then. 3 vols (vol. I, vol. II, vol. III). 1887.

=== Collected editions (fiction) ===
Novels by W.B. and James Rice. Library ed. 10 vols. 1887–88. Comprising in sequence Ready-Money Mortiboy, This Son of Vulcan, With Harp and Crown, The Golden Butterfly, By Celia's Arbour, The Seamy Side, The Chaplain of the Fleet, The Case of Mr. Lucraft and Other Tales, 'Twas in Trafalgar's Bay and Other Stories, The Ten Years' Tenant and Other Stories [My Little Girl, The Monks of Thelema apparently missing from this series].

=== Plays ===
- The Charm and other drawing-room plays. With W. Pollock. 1896

=== General non-fiction ===
[excluding items on London]

==== Books ====
- Studies in Early French Poetry. London: Macmillan & Co., 1868.
- Jerusalem, the City of Herod and Saladin. Richard Bentley & Son, 1871. Joint author: E. H. Palmer.
- The French Humourists from the 12th to the 19th Century. Beutley, 1873.
- Constantinople. A Sketch of its History from its Foundation to its Conquest by the Turks in 1453. London: Seeley, Jackson, and Halliday, 1879. Joint author: William Jackson Brodribb.
- Rabelais. London: William Blackwood and Sons, 1879 (Foreign Classics for English Readers).
- Sir Richard Whittington, Lord Mayor of London. London and Belfast: Marcus Ward & Co., and New York: G. P. Putnam's Sons, 1881 (The New Plutarch). New ed. 1894. Joint author: James Rice.
- Gaspard II de Coligny (Marquis de Chatillon). London and Belfast: Marcus Ward & Co., 1879 (The New Plutarch). New ed. 1894.
- The Life and Achievements of Edward Henry Palmer. London: John Murray, 1883.
- The Art of Fiction: A Lecture Delivered at the Royal Institution on Friday Evening, April 25, 1884. London: Chatto & Windus, 1884. New ed., 1902.
- William Tuckwell, Art and Hand Work for the People, being Three Papers Read before the Social Science Congress, Sept. 1884. By W.T., C. G. Leland, and W. Besant. Manchester, 1885.
- The Eulogy of Richard Jefferies. London: Chatto & Windus, 1888.
- Fifty Years Ago. London: Chatto & Windus, and New York : Harper and Brothers, 1888.
- Captain Cook, London: Macmillan and Co., 1890 (English Men of Action)
- The Queen's Reign and Its Commemoration, 1837-1897. London: The Werner Company, 1897.
- The Rise of Empire. Horace Marshall & Son, 1897 (Story of the Empire Series)
- The Pen and the Book. London: Thomas Burleigh, 1899.
- The Story of King Alfred. London: George Newnes, 1901; New York: D. Appleton & Co., 1903 (Library of Valuable Information)
- Autobiography of Sir Walter Besant. With Prefatory Note by S. Squire Sprigge. London: Hutchinson & Co., and New York: Dodd, Mead & Co., 1902.
- As We Are and As We May Be. London: Chatto & Windus, 1903.
- Essays and Historiettes. London: Chatto & Windus, 1903.
- Sir Walter Besant's 'Bourbon' Journal: A Visit From Mauritius to Bourbon (L'Ile de La Reunion), August 6th to 28th 1863, London: Besant & Co., 1933.

==== Articles ====
- "The Amusements of the People", Contemporary Review 45 (1884): 342-53.

=== Selected books on London ===
[volumes in the 10-volume Survey of London published by A & C. Black are included under their individual volume titles and marked with an asterisk]

- "The People's Palace", Contemporary Review 51 (1887): 226-33.
- East London. 1901.
- Early London: prehistoric, Roman, Saxon, and Norman. 1908.*
- Hackney and Stoke Newington. With G. E. Mitton. Fascination of London series. 1908.
- Holborn and Bloomsbury. With G. E. Mitton. Fascination of London series. 1903.
- London. 1892.
- London. 1894.
- London. City. 1910.*
- London in the Eighteenth Century. 1902.*
- London in the Nineteenth Century. 1909.*=
- London in the Time of the Stuarts. 1903.*=
- London in the Time of the Tudors. 1904.*
- London, North of the Thames. 1911.*
- London, South of the Thames. 1912.*
- Medieval London. 2 vols. 1906.**
- Shoreditch and the East End. With others. Fascination of London series. 1908.
- South London. 1899.
- The Strand District. With G. E. Mitton. Fascination of London series. Repr. with corrections. 1903.
- The Thames. Fascination of London series. 1903.
- Westminster. 1895.
