= The Forest of Hands and Teeth =

2009 novel by Carrie Ryan

- Cover of The Forest of Hands and Teeth
- Author: Carrie Ryan
- Cover artist: Jonathan Barkat
- Language: English
- Series: The Forest of Hands and Teeth #1
- Genre: Young adult, zombie apocalypse
- Publisher: Random House
- Publication date: March 10, 2009
- Publication place: United States
- Media type: Print (Hardback)
- Pages: 312 pp
- ISBN: 0-385-73681-9
- OCLC: 226291601
- Followed by: The Dead-Tossed Waves

The Forest of Hands and Teeth is a 2009 New York Times best-selling post-apocalyptic zombie novel by first-time author Carrie Ryan that is marketed to young adults. It was published on March 10, 2009 by Random House Delacorte Press in the United States, and by Hachette Gollancz in Australia and the United Kingdom. This is the first volume of a trilogy; the second book in the series, The Dead-Tossed Waves, was released on March 9, 2010, and The Dark and Hollow Places followed in March 2011. As the story opens, an unexplained disaster has turned much of the human race into mindless, cannibalistic undead. They roam the titular forest, seeking to destroy a band of survivors barricaded inside a walled village deep in the woods. However, the fence that protects these villagers also imprisons them within a dystopian society marked by violence, secrecy, and repression. The forest thus profoundly influences all the action of the novel.

== Plot summary ==
Mary lives in a town ruled by the Sisterhood and the Guardians. The village is surrounded by fences; beyond lies only forest. There are only three ways through the fence: gates that open on paths that are themselves enclosed by fencing, expelling those who've been infected. Where the two paths lead, no one knows, for the Sisterhood says the village is the only human habitation left on Earth.

Mary has been raised on stories passed down from her great-great-great-grandmother about life before the coming of zombies. She is especially fascinated by the ocean and believes if she could reach it, she would be free.

Her adventure starts when there is a breaching in the fence. Mary must escape, find true love, and friendship while figuring out the mystery behind the other gates and fences. After a sad, hectic, twisted turn of events she finds the ocean, but it isn't at all what she expected.

== Characters ==
Mary
The narrator, a teenager who wishes to learn what lies beyond the village. She is in love with Travis. She is very curious about the ocean, which no one believes is real.
Jed
Mary's brother, a Guardian. Jed blames her for their mother's death and expels her from their home, leaving her no choice but to join the Sisterhood. He is married to Beth.
Travis
The boy Mary loves. Though he returns her feelings, he won't marry her because his brother is in love with her. Instead, he asks Mary's best friend, Cass, to become his wife.
Harry
Travis's brother, who is in love with Mary though the feeling is not reciprocated. Nevertheless, Mary agrees to wed him to escape the Sisterhood. He soon develops feelings for Cass while Travis is recovering from his broken leg.
Beth
Jed's wife and the sister of Harry and Travis.
Argos
A young dog (Pug) who was given to Mary by Harry as a wedding present. Later in the book, Mary gives Argos to Jacob.
Jacob
A young boy rescued by Harry when the village is overrun. When his parents and sister are most likely killed, Cass takes him in as her adoptive son.
Cassandra (Cass)
Mary's best friend until a love-quadrilateral estranges them. Mary says she smells like sunshine.
Gabrielle
A girl from Village XIV. After her town is overrun with Unconsecrated, she flees down the paths, apparently reaching the sea at one point. She eventually ends up in Mary's village.
Sister Tabitha
The oldest Sister and head of the Sisterhood, the religious order that runs Mary's village. She believes the Return is God's punishment for human curiosity and warns Mary not to seek answers beyond what the Sisterhood offers.
The Lighthouse Keeper
A man whom Mary encounters at the end of her journey.

== Critical reception ==
The Forest of Hands and Teeth debuted in the US to critical acclaim, receiving starred reviews from School Library Journal and Publishers Weekly, which described the book as "fresh and riveting." MTV called it "a pretty freakin' amazing, empowering and absolutely thrilling young-adult post-apocalyptic zombie love story." Author and critic Bidisha selected The Forest of Hands and Teeth as one of the best books of the year for The Observer and Jo Fletcher picked it as one of the most notable books of the year at the World Fantasy Convention.

=== Accolades ===
Paperback cover of The Forest of Hands and Teeth

- A New York Times best-seller
- A Junior Library Guild selection
- #4 on the IndieBound Kids' Indie Next List for Spring 2009
- A Borders Original Voices selection for April 2009 and Borders Original Voices finalist
- Selected as an American Library Association "Best Book for Young Adults"
- Selected for the Texas Library Association TAYSHAS High School Reading list (2010–2011)
- Selected by librarians at the Denver Public Library as one of the Best Teen Books of 2009
- Nominated for the North Carolina School Library Media Association Young Adult Book Award
- Georgia Peach Book Award Honor Book 2010–2011

== Film adaptation ==
Seven Star Pictures optioned the film rights to The Forest of Hands and Teeth in 2009, intending to fast-track the project. The film is now with Hetherwood Productions and was in production as of May 2016. Maisie Williams is set to star as of September, 2015. Kate Maberly will write and direct the feature with Doug Liman and Fred Roos is set to produce.
