= The Resistance (Malley novel) =

2008 novel by Gemma Malley

- First edition
- Author: Gemma Malley
- Language: English, German, Spanish and French
- Series: The Declaration Trilogy
- Genre: Children's
- Publisher: Bloomsbury Publishing PLC
- Publication date: 1 September 2008
- Publication place: United Kingdom
- Pages: 336 pp
- ISBN: 978-0-7475-8772-9
- OCLC: 316008914
- Preceded by: The Declaration
- Followed by: The Legacy

The Resistance is a children's novel by Gemma Malley, published in 2008. It is a sequel to the book The Declaration, which is set in the year 2140. It is followed by The Legacy, published in 2010.

== Plot ==
Prior to the events of this novel, the world had become overpopulated due invention of a drug that lets people live forever. A "Declaration" is created which people who take the drug, named Longevity, must sign. By signing they give up the right to have children, though some powerful people are given exceptions. Those who take the drug and still have children are called the "Surplus".

The book opens as Peter is pretending to live life as a legal by working for his grandfather, Richard Pincent, at Pincent Pharma. In reality he is attempting to help the underground, coordinating with Pip, the leader of the Underground in all but name, an organization dedicated to destroying Longevity. Peter is being watched at work by his half-brother Jude through hacked security cameras. Peter's grandfather pressures Peter to sign the Declaration in order to harm the underground and help launch a new drug Longevity+. Peter, with the encouragement and support of his girlfriend Anna, who he lives with, initially plans to decline to sign the Declaration.

While attempting to steal a document from his grandfather's office, a task which is surprisingly easy, Peter finds out about a planned Surplus Sterilisation Programme. He discovers his name and that of Anna on the list of people to be sterilized. Returning home Peter gets drunk and says to Anna that they should both sign the Declaration. In response, Anna calls Pip, but Peter does not listen to him either. Peter and Anna continue to fight about whether to sign the Declaration until Richard convinces Anna to sign. While Anna does this, she is soon arrested by the Catchers/Police with stolen documents - it's an apparent set-up.

Meanwhile, Jude breaks into Pincent Pharma in order to disrupt the launch of Longevity+. He is captured but manages to escape. Peter gets caught by his grandfather snooping though Peter has already learned that the company plans to use Surplus girls to harvest fetuses. This causes Peter to change his mind about signing the Declaration. He is saved from his grandfather by Pip, who'd been inside the company attempting to rescue Anna. The group learns Anna is pregnant. After seeming to cave to his grandfather's demands, Peter uses the opportunity of the Longevity+ press conference to reveal the company's plans to the world. He and Anna escape to hiding in Scotland, while Jude has joined the Underground in London. Following Peter's revelations society has started to become unbalanced.

== Prequel and sequel ==
Gemma Malley's The Declaration series is made up of The Declaration (2007), The Resistance (2009) and The Legacy (2010).
