= Annabeth =

Annabeth is a female English given name created from a combination of the names Anna and Beth.

== People ==
People with the given name Annabeth include:

- Annabeth Donovan (born 1995), American field hockey player
- Annabeth Gish (born 1971), an American actress with starring roles in Shag, Mystic Pizza and Double Jeopardy
- Annabeth Rosen (born 1957), an American sculptor and art studio faculty member at the University of California, Davis
- Annabeth Barnes, an 11-year-old go-kart racer featured in the documentary film Racing Dreams
- Annabeth Berkeley, a dancer with National Dance Company Wales
- Annabeth Robinson, a Second Life digital performer who lectures at the Leeds College of Art

== Fictional characters ==
- Annabeth Chase, a daughter of Athena in Rick Riordan's Percy Jackson & the Olympians and one of the seven half-bloods in The Heroes of Olympus. She is played by Leah Sava Jeffries in the Disney Plus series and Alexandra Daddario in the movies.
- Annabeth J'Amelia "A.J." Hazelwood, a character in Margaret Peterson Haddix's novel Turnabout
- Annabeth Lisbon, Teresa's niece in the television series The Mentalist, played by Madison McLaughlin
- Annabeth Schott, a character on the political drama The West Wing, played by Kristin Chenoweth
- Annabeth "Beth" Tezuka, a character in the series Bravest Warriors.
- Annabeth Nass, a character from "Hart of Dixie", portrayed by Kaitlyn Black

== See also ==
- Anna
- Beth
- Annabel
