= Uprising (disambiguation) =

Uprising is a synonym for rebellion.

Uprising may also refer to:

== Art, entertainment, and media ==
=== Books and comics ===
- StarCraft: Uprising, a novel in the StarCraft series by Micky Neilson
- The Uprising (Under the North Star), the second volume of the Under the North Star trilogy by Väinö Linna
- Uprising!, a 1981 history book by David Irving
- Uprising, a 2001 novel by Randy Boyd
- Uprising (novel), a 2007 novel by Margaret Peterson Haddix
- Uprising, a 2008 comic by Brian Bendis
- Uprising, a 2009 novel by Douglas Bland
- Uprising, a 2010 novel by Scott Mariani
- Uprising, a 2010 Star Wars novel by Alex Wheeler
- Uprising, a 2014 sci-fi novel by Jeremy Robinson
- Uprising, a 2014 novel by Jack Whyte
- Uprising, a 2019 science fiction novel by Fletcher DeLancey, the eighth book in the Chronicles of Alsea series
- Uprising (Diamond and Silk book), 2020 book by Diamond and Silk
- Uprising, a 2024 novel by Jennifer A. Nielsen

=== Film and television ===
- The Uprising (1912 film), a silent short film drama
- The Uprising (2026 film), a film by Paul Greengrass
- Uprising (1998 film), a documentary produced by TGR
- Uprising (2001 film), a film about the Warsaw Ghetto Uprising
- Uprising (2012 film), a film based on the 2011 Egyptian Revolution
- Uprising (2024 film), a South Korean historical war action film
- Pacific Rim Uprising, a 2018 sequel to Pacific Rim
- "Uprising" (Agents of S.H.I.E.L.D.), an episode of the American television series Agents of S.H.I.E.L.D.
- "Uprising" (Arrow), an episode of the American television series Arrow
- Uprising (TV series), a 2021 three-part documentary series
- Tron: Uprising, a 2012–2013 television series set in the Tron universe

=== Video games ===
- Uprising (video game) or Uprising: Join or Die, a 1997 military combat game, followed by two sequels
- Command & Conquer: Red Alert 3 – Uprising, a 2009 real-time strategy game
- Kid Icarus: Uprising, a 2012 third-person shooter
- Boston Uprising, a professional Overwatch League team

=== Music ===
- Uprising Records, record label
- "Uprising" (song), the first single from the Muse album The Resistance

==== Albums ====
- Uprising (Bleed from Within album), a 2013 heavy metal album
- Uprising (Bob Marley and the Wailers album), a 1980 reggae album
- Uprising (Concord Dawn album), a 2003 drum and bass album
- Uprising (Entombed album), a 2000 heavy metal album
- Uprising (Universal Poplab album), a 2006 synthpop album
- The Uprising (album), an album by Foreign Beggars

== See also ==
- List of revolutions and rebellions
- Serbian Uprising (disambiguation)
