= Education in Second Life =

Second Life is used as a platform for education by many institutions, such as colleges, universities, libraries and government entities.

== Impact and current status ==
There are over one hundred regions used for educational purposes covering subjects such as chemistry and English. Instructors and researchers in Second Life favor it because it is more personal than traditional distance learning. Research published in 2007 suggested that development, teaching and/or learning activities using Second Life were present in over 80 percent of UK universities. As of 2008, at least 300 universities around the world teach courses or conduct research in SL. New educational institutions have also emerged that operate exclusively within Second Life, taking advantage of the platform to deliver content to a worldwide audience at low cost.

== Structure ==
Info Islands uses library programming sponsored by the Illinois' Alliance Library System and OPAL currently offered online to librarians and library users within Second Life. Another virtual continent called SciLands is devoted to science and technology education. While initially centered on the International Spaceflight Museum, it now hosts a number of organizations including NASA, NOAA, NIH, JPL, NPR, National Physical Laboratory, UK, and a host of other government agencies, universities, and museums. In December 2008, the United States Air Force launched MyBase, a Second Life island overseen by the Air Education and Training Command.

Second Life's usefulness as a platform for pre-K–12 education is limited due to the age restrictions on the main grid and the difficulties of collaborating among various educational projects on the teen grid.

== Educational disciplines ==
=== Accounting ===
Ernst & Young made a $500,000 donation to the North Carolina State University Accounting Department to implement Second Life into the curriculum in 2009. This funding was utilized by Frank A Buckless along with Mr. Scott Showalter and Dr. Kathy Krawczyk to create a virtual warehouse for their students to audit. The data collected from this study showed that students improved "inventory observation knowledge, interviewing, audit documentation, critical thinking, and group work skills". This project follows incorporation of cost and financial accounting activities in virtual environments.

=== Language ===
Language learning is the most widespread type of education in virtual worlds,

=== Nursing ===
Second life has been utilized in nursing education to provide meaningful care experience without risk to patients.

Dr. Constance M. Johnson received a R21 award to evaluate the feasibility and acceptability of using a virtual environment to provide self-management interventions to people with type 2 diabetes.

Dr. Estelle Codier (University of Hawaii) received a National League for Nursing grant award to study learning outcomes for student nurses in Second Life. Her book, "Teaching Healthcare in Virtual Space: Best Practices for Educators in Multi-User Virtual Environments" provides an outline of the pedagogical basis for teaching in MUVE, as well as chapters on development of MUVE teaching skills and others on how to develop learning activities in Second Life. July, 2016.

== Controversy ==
=== Ban of educational institution ===
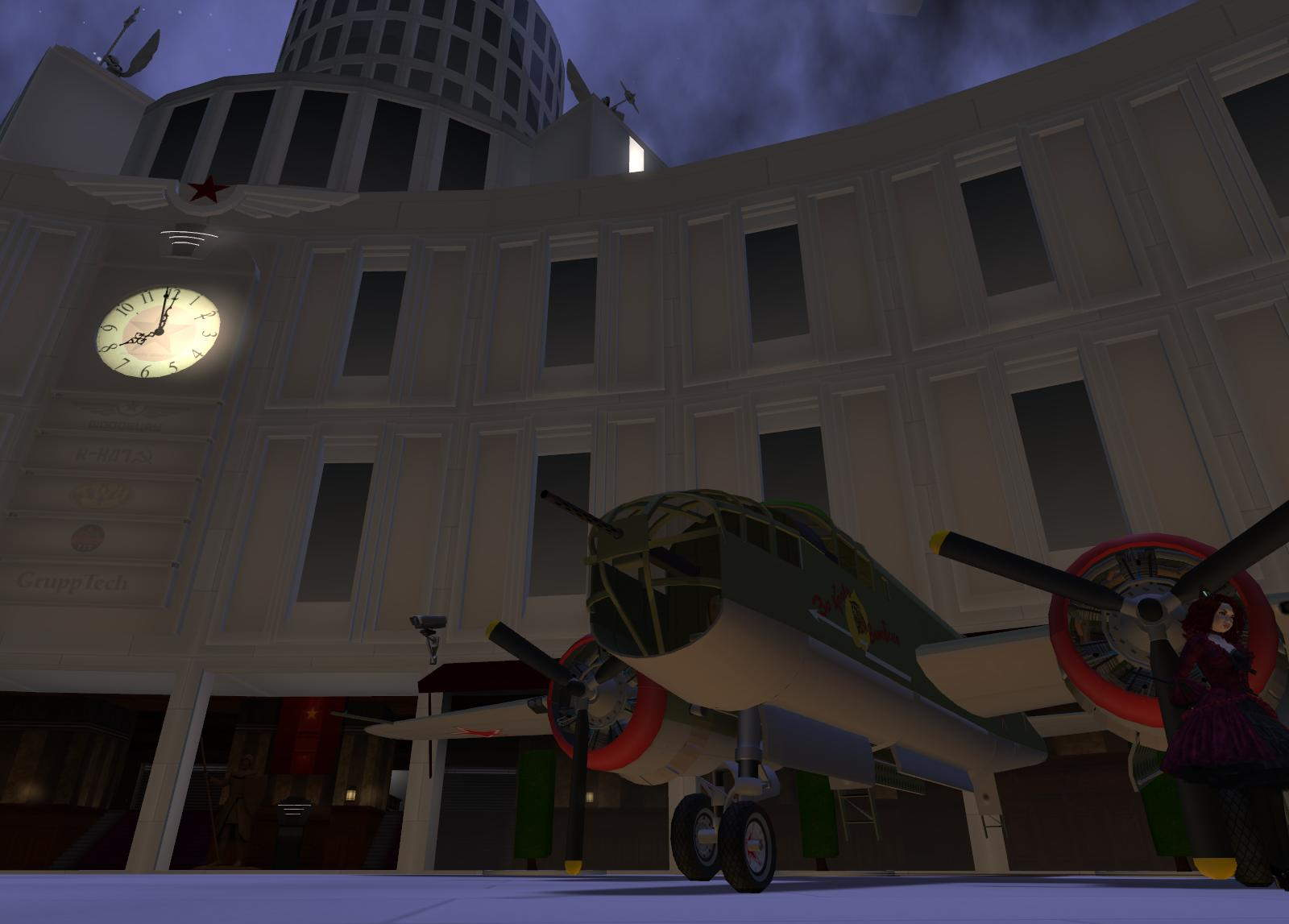
Woodbury University's virtual campus

Second Life has twice, in 2007 and 2010, banned a California educational institution, Woodbury University, from having a representation within Second Life. On 20 April 2010 four simulators belonging to the university were deleted and the accounts of several students and professors terminated, according to The Chronicle of Higher Education. Dr. Edward Clift, the dean of Woodbury University's School of Media, Culture and Design, stated that their campus "was a living, breathing campus in Second Life", that included educational spaces designed mostly by students, including a mock representation of the former Soviet Union and a replica of the Berlin Wall. As Dr. Clift told The Chronicle of Higher Education, the virtual campus did not "conform to what Linden Lab wanted a campus to be". Linden Lab said their decision to ban Woodbury University in April 2010 was "based on historical and recent events that constitute a breach of the Second Life community standards and terms of service."

The university has since moved to a separate, dedicated OpenSimulator grid.

== Second Life Educators ==
=== Annabeth Robinson ===
Main Article: Annabeth Robinson

Annabeth Robinson is a Second Life performer and educator who lectures at Leeds College of Art. She develops tools and techniques for improving virtual environment education including the widely used MetaLab Whiteboard.

=== Robin Winter ===
Robin Winter a.k.a. Shukran Fahid / Shukran Serendipity has worked with several organisations including Immersive Education and Imperial College to produce a number of training programmes for schools, universities, the NHS and the Ministry of Defense using both Second Life and Open Sim. Currently the CEO of Warm Winter Arts, he is bringing virtualisation into mobile applications and biological sciences.

=== Estelle Codier ===
Dr. Estelle Codier is an associate professor at the University of Hawaii who has supervised over 500 health care learning activities in Second Life. Her book, "Teaching Healthcare in Second Life: Best Practices for Educators in Multi User Virtual Environments" outlines a pedagogical basis for teaching in Second Life and provides guidelines for developing teaching skills and learning activities in MUVE. July, 2016.
