= The Village (2004 film) =

2004 thriller film by M. Night Shyamalan

- Theatrical release poster
- Directed by: M. Night Shyamalan
- Written by: M. Night Shyamalan
- Produced by: Sam Mercer; Scott Rudin; M. Night Shyamalan
- Starring: Joaquin Phoenix; Adrien Brody; Bryce Dallas Howard; William Hurt; Sigourney Weaver; Brendan Gleeson
- Cinematography: Roger Deakins
- Edited by: Christopher Tellefsen
- Music by: James Newton Howard
- Production companies: Touchstone Pictures; Blinding Edge Pictures; Scott Rudin Productions
- Distributed by: Buena Vista Pictures Distribution
- Release dates: July 26, 2004 (premiere); July 30, 2004 (United States); August 6, 2004 (United Kingdom)
- Running time: 108 minutes
- Country: United States
- Language: English
- Budget: $60–71.7 million
- Box office: $256.7 million

The Village (marketed as M. Night Shyamalan's The Village) is a 2004 American horror film written, produced, and directed by M. Night Shyamalan. It stars Bryce Dallas Howard, Joaquin Phoenix, Adrien Brody, William Hurt, Sigourney Weaver, and Brendan Gleeson. The story is about a village whose population lives in fear of creatures inhabiting the woods beyond it.

The Village received mixed reviews and grossed $256.7 million worldwide. James Newton Howard was nominated for Best Original Score at the 77th Academy Awards.

== Plot ==
A small remote village, apparently 19th-century, lives in fear of nameless humanoid creatures, known only as "Those We Do Not Speak Of", that inhabit the surrounding woods. Staffed watchtowers and tall poles with oil lamps line the village perimeter for protection. The color red is banned, as it attracts the creatures.

Following a young villager's death due to illness, Lucius Hunt is denied the elders' permission to travel through the woods and retrieve medical supplies from "the towns" to avoid similar tragedies. Later, Lucius's widowed mother, Alice, questions his desire to visit "the towns", which the elders describe as wicked. The elders appear to have secrets, and each keeps a locked black box containing unknown items. Lucius secretly ventures into the woods, though he later tells the elders and claims it was safe. Soon after, skinned animal carcasses appear in the village. One night, the creatures enter the village, leaving red paint splashes on people's doors as a warning.

Elder Edward Walker's daughter Kitty is attracted to Lucius, but he loves Ivy, Kitty's visually impaired and empathic younger sister. Kitty marries another, which allows Ivy and Lucius to become betrothed. Before they can marry, Noah Percy, a young man with an apparent developmental disability, stabs Lucius out of jealousy, seriously wounding him. As the elders consider Noah's fate, he remains locked in a small building.

Edward defies the other elders by sending Ivy, accompanied by two young men, to the towns to retrieve medicine for Lucius. Before she leaves, Edward reveals that the creatures are actually the elders disguised as monsters to deter younger members from leaving. The skinned animal remains were not part of their plan, since one of the village elders took their lie too far and must be stopped. In the woods, the boys become frightened and abandon Ivy. She continues alone and is stalked by a creature, which she tricks into fatally falling into a deep hole. Unbeknownst to Ivy, the creature was Noah, wearing a costume. Meanwhile, Edward and his wife Tabitha unlock their box, which contains photos of themselves and the other elders when they were younger. The group is standing outside a modern-day counseling center, revealing that it is actually the late 20th or early 21st century.

Ivy climbs over a high wall. On the other side, she encounters Kevin, a Walker Wildlife Reserve park ranger, who is shocked that she came from the woods. Ivy gives him a list of medicines she must acquire.

It is revealed that Edward, a former history professor, founded the village over two decades earlier. He had recruited people he met at a grief counseling clinic, hoping to isolate themselves from societal violence. Edward's family fortune funds the wildlife reserve, built the village inside it, and paid off the government to make it a no-fly zone.

Ivy returns to the village with the medication obtained from Kevin, never seeing the modern world. The elders' boxes are shown to contain items from their earlier lives. The elders gather around Lucius's bed after learning that Ivy has returned and that a creature, Noah, was killed. Edward comforts Noah's grieving parents by saying that his death will enable them to continue the farce that creatures inhabit the woods.

== Cast ==
- Bryce Dallas Howard as Ivy Elizabeth Walker
- Joaquin Phoenix as Lucius Hunt
- Adrien Brody as Noah Percy
- Sigourney Weaver as Alice Hunt, Lucius' mother
- William Hurt as Edward Walker, Kitty and Ivy's father
- Brendan Gleeson as August Nicholson
- Cherry Jones as Mrs. Clack
- Judy Greer as Kitty Walker, Ivy's older sister
- Michael Pitt as Finton Coin
- Celia Weston as Vivian Percy, Noah's mother
- Jayne Atkinson as Tabitha Walker, Kitty and Ivy's mother
- Frank Collison as Victor
- Jesse Eisenberg as Jamison
- Fran Kranz as Christop Crane
- Liz Stauber as Beatrice
- Charlie Hofheimer as Kevin Lupinski
- M. Night Shyamalan as Jay, Kevin's supervisor

== Production ==
The film was originally titled The Woods, but the name was changed because a film in production by director Lucky McKee, The Woods (2006), already had that title. Like other M. Night Shyamalan productions, this film had high levels of secrecy surrounding it, to protect the expected twist ending that became a Shyamalan trademark. Despite that, the script was stolen over a year before the film was released, prompting many "pre-reviews" of the film on several Internet film sites and much fan speculation about plot details. The village set in the film was built in its entirety in one field outside Chadds Ford, Pennsylvania. An adjacent field contained an on-location temporary sound stage. Production on the film started in October 2003, with delays because some scenes needing fall foliage could not be shot because of a late fall season. Principal photography was wrapped up in mid-December of that year. In April and May 2004, several of the lead actors were called back to the set. Reports noted that this seemed to have something to do with a change to the film's ending, and, in fact, the film's final ending differs from the ending in a stolen version of the script that surfaced a year earlier; the script version ends after Ivy climbs over the wall and gets help from a truck driver, while the film version has Ivy meeting a park ranger and scenes where she returns to the village.

== Music ==
=== Soundtrack ===
The Village

Film score by James Newton Howard
- Released: July 27, 2004
- Genre: Soundtrack
- Length: 42:29
- Label: Hollywood
- Producer: James Newton Howard

James Newton Howard chronology
| Hidalgo (2004) | The Village (2004) | Collateral (2004) |

Professional ratings
Review scores
| Source | Rating |
|---|---|
| SoundtrackNet | 4/5 stars |
| allmusic | 3.5/5 stars |
| Filmtracks | 4/5 stars |

The film's score was composed by James Newton Howard, and features solo violinist Hilary Hahn. The film was nominated for the Academy Award for Best Original Score, but lost to Finding Neverland.

Track listing

1. "Noah Visits"
2. "What Are You Asking Me?"
3. "The Bad Color"
4. "Those We Don't Speak Of"
5. "Will You Help Me?"
6. "I Cannot See His Color"
7. "Rituals"
8. "The Gravel Road"
9. "Race to Resting Rock"
10. "The Forbidden Line"
11. "The Vote"
12. "It Is Not Real"
13. "The Shed Not to Be Used"

== Reception ==
=== Box office ===
The Village made $50.7 million during its opening weekend. The film grossed $114 million in the U.S., and $142 million in international markets. Its worldwide box office totalled $256 million, the tenth highest grossing PG-13 movie of 2004.

=== Critical response ===
On Rotten Tomatoes, a review aggregator website, the film has an approval rating of 43% based on 220 reviews, with an average rating of 5.4/10. The site's critics' consensus reads, "The Village is appropriately creepy, but Shyamalan's signature twist ending disappoints." At Metacritic, the film holds a score of 44 out of 100 based on 40 critics, indicating "mixed or average reviews". Audiences surveyed by CinemaScore gave the film an average grade of "C" on an A+ to F scale.

Roger Ebert gave the film one star and wrote: "The Village is a colossal miscalculation, a movie based on a premise that cannot support it, a premise so transparent it would be laughable were the movie not so deadly solemn ... To call the ending an anticlimax would be an insult not only to climaxes but to prefixes. It's a crummy secret, about one step up the ladder of narrative originality from It was all a dream. It's so witless, in fact, that when we do discover the secret, we want to rewind the film so we don't know the secret anymore." Ebert named the film the tenth worst film of 2004 and subsequently put it on his "Most Hated" list. There were also comments that the film, while raising questions about conformity in a time of "evil," did little to "confront" those themes. Slate's Michael Agger commented that Shyamalan was continuing in a pattern of making "sealed-off movies that [fall] apart when exposed to outside logic."

The movie had a number of admirers. Critic Jeffrey Westhoff commented that though the film had its shortcomings, these did not necessarily render it a bad movie, and that "Shyamalan's orchestration of mood and terror is as adroit as ever."

In France, the Cahiers du cinéma praised the movie, putting it in second place (tie) in their 2004 annual top list. Some other French film critics shared their enthusiasm, such as Le Monde, which described the film as a "horrific post-9/11 fable", "a political film disguised as fantasy, a work of great beauty shot through with primal anxieties and universal aspirations". But the general reception of the film remains mixed: Libération called it a "Jansenist turkey", which "pretends to worry about the isolationism of its ass-benitent heroes, but shows above all that it understands their fears and feels sympathy for them"; and Télérama described the filmmaker as "once again taking himself for Hitchcock".

=== Re-evaluation ===
The film has received some additional positive reviews since its release including Emily St. James of Vox and Chris Evangelista of SlashFilm who thought it was one of Shyamalan's best films, Adam Chitwood of Collider who praised the ending, the performances of Howard, Phoenix, and Hurt, and the cinematography, and Kayleigh Donaldson of Syfy Wire who praised the cinematography, and said, "...[the film] stands as one of the strongest representations of Shyamalan’s ethos, for better or worse." Carlos Morales of IGN argued that the film was misunderstood at the time of its release because it was mismarketed as a horror film, and also because of audience expectations that had been built up by Shyamalan's three previous films. "The real twist was that the movie they wanted wasn't the one Shyamalan made."

Philip Horne of The Daily Telegraph in a later review noted "this exquisitely crafted allegory of American soul-searching seems to have been widely misunderstood."

=== Accolades ===
2005 ASCAP Film and Television Music Awards

- Won – Top Box Office Film — James Newton Howard

2004 Academy Awards (Oscars)

- Nominated – Best Original Score — James Newton Howard

2005 10th Empire Awards

- Nominated – Best Actress — Bryce Dallas Howard
- Nominated – Best Newcomer — Bryce Dallas Howard
- Nominated – Best Director — M. Night Shyamalan

2005 Evening Standard British Film Awards

- Won – Best Technical/Artistic Achievement — Roger Deakins

2005 MTV Movie Awards

- Nominated – Best Breakthrough Female Performance — Bryce Dallas Howard

2005 Motion Picture Sound Editors (Golden Reel Award)

- Nominated – Best Sound Editing in a Feature: Music, Feature Film — Thomas S. Drescher

2004 Online Film Critics Society Awards

- Nominated – Best Breakthrough Performance — Bryce Dallas Howard

2005 Teen Choice Awards

- Nominated – Choice Movie Scary Scene — Bryce Dallas Howard, Ivy Walker waits at the door for Lucius Hunt.
- Nominated – Choice Movie: Thriller

==== Other honors ====
The film is recognized by American Film Institute in these lists:

- 2005: AFI's 100 Years of Film Scores – Nominated

The soundtrack was widely praised, and was nominated by the American Film Institute as one of the Best Film Scores and the Academy Award for Best Original Score.

=== Plagiarism allegation ===
Simon & Schuster, publishers of the 1995 young adult book Running Out of Time by Margaret Peterson Haddix, claimed that the film had taken ideas from the book. The plot of Shyamalan's movie had several similarities to the book. They both involve a 19th-century village, which is actually a park in the present day, have young heroines on a search for medical supplies, and both have adult leaders bent on keeping the children in their village from discovering the truth. No lawsuit was ever filed over the similarity.

== Home media ==
The Village was released on DVD on Jan 11, 2005.

== See also ==
- Allegory of the cave
