= Claim to Fame (disambiguation) =

Claim to Fame is a 2022 American reality competition series.

Claim to Fame may also refer to:

- Claim to Fame (novel), 2009 novel by Margaret Peterson Haddix
- "Claim to Fame", a song by Jeezy from I Might Forgive... But I Don't Forget (2023)
- "Claim to Fame", episode 2, season 2 of Project Runway Canada
