= Among the Enemy =

2005 novel by Margaret Peterson Haddix

Among The Enemy
- Second edition cover
- Author: Margaret Peterson Haddix
- Cover artist: Cliff Nielsen
- Language: English
- Series: Shadow Children sequence
- Genre: Middle Grade, Dystopian
- Publisher: Simon & Schuster
- Publication date: June 2005
- Publication place: United States
- Media type: Print (hardback & paperback)
- Pages: 229
- ISBN: 0-689-85796-9
- OCLC: 55138543
- LC Class: PZ7.H1164 Ale 2005
- Preceded by: Among the Brave
- Followed by: Among the Free

Among the Enemy is a 2005 novel by Margaret Peterson Haddix, about a time in which drastic measures have been taken to quell overpopulation. It is the sixth of seven novels in the Shadow Children series.

The general plot revolves around the government's lies about an overpopulated world in order to gain control of the Earth's resources. In this turmoil, the democratic government has been overthrown and a totalitarian government has been put in its place. Laws established by the regime prohibit a family from having more than two children to lower the rate of birth. Children born after the second child—referred to as "shadow children"—will be killed.

== Plot summary ==
Matthias, Percy, and Alia, (from Among the Betrayed) are introduced once again. At Niedler School they are apprehended along with many other children and put in a truck to be taken, supposedly, to a work camp. They are saved when Matthias finds a nail, slashes the tires and crashes into a tree that falls, injuring Alia in the process, and allows them to escape. They run immediately to the forest, and Percy is shot in a crossfire between Population Police and Rebels while they are trying to find a place to hide. Matthias is able to drag Percy and Alia, now both critically ill, into a rebel hideout cabin, whose dwellers are killed by the Population Police, and then he runs to Mr. Hendrick's cottage to get help.

He returns from Mr. Hendrick's cottage with Mrs. Talbot, a talented doctor and wife of a rebel leader, Mr. Talbot. Finding Alia and Percy missing, Matthias then ends up saving a Population Police Officer Tidwell, called Tiddy by his friends, from a deadly shootout. They end up at Population Police headquarters, where he finds an expected favor from the commander of the base as a result of his association with Tiddy, a favorite of the commander's. Tiddy goes to the forest and reports upon his return that he torched the entire area. Unexpectedly, he dies from poison soon afterward. Matthias grieves for Percy and Alia who he believes are now dead, though makes it appear as though he is grieving for Tiddy instead. The commander provides Matthias with special allowances, believing that Matthias is devastated by Tiddy's death, and Matthias pretends to enjoy the commander's company to avoid getting into trouble.

Matthias soon encounters Nina, working undercover at the headquarters, and she reluctantly reveals what she, Lee (Luke Garner), and several other allies are doing in hopes of overthrowing the Population Police. The commander also takes the boy to a warehouse full of food, where Matthias realizes that he must stop grieving over Percy and Alia and help Nina and her friends. Thanks to Matthias, they are soon able to overhear many of the commander and the Population Police's plans, including one involving Jason Barstow, a boy who betrayed Nina to the Population Police.

Matthias eventually escapes from headquarters to aid Nina and the others but is caught by Mike, a Population Police agent and Tiddy's best friend. However, Mike soon reveals that he is actually a double-agent, having previously saved Matthias and Nina when they were caught during a secret meeting to exchange information. They make their way to the warehouse and empty it of all its food by "lending" it to the local population. The warehouse, which also contains fake ID cards as well as the local population's real ID cards, is destroyed to prevent the Population Police from exacting a plan that would expose illegal thirds and other people targeted by the Population Police as enemies.

The pair remain in hiding for several days before returning to Mr. Hendricks' house, where Matthias hopes to apologize to Mr. Talbot for abandoning Mrs. Talbot in the forest where Percy and Alia perished. However, when they arrive, Matthias is relieved and overjoyed to discover his friends and Mrs. Talbot are safe and alive. Mike reveals himself to be Nedley, an ally from Among the Brave. Matthias decides to remain at the Mr. Hendricks' cabin with his friends until he decides what he will do next with his life, though he is content to remain with Percy, Alia, and everyone else.
