= Escape from Memory =

2003 novel by Margaret Peterson Haddix

- First edition
- Author: Margaret Peterson Haddix
- Language: English
- Publisher: Simon & Schuster
- Publication date: 2003
- Publication place: United States
- Pages: 220
- ISBN: 978-0-689-85421-7

Escape from Memory is a young adult novel by Margaret Peterson Haddix. It was published in 2003 by Simon & Schuster.

== Plot summary ==
Kira Landon is a fifteen-year-old girl whose life has been completely normal until her friends talk her into being hypnotized. She finds herself revealing things about a past that she never knew, remembering her mother carrying her through war-torn cobblestone streets while speaking a foreign language. Kira's best friend Lynne pushes her to investigate, but before they can find out anything, Mrs. Landon disappears. That evening, a strange woman shows up at Kira's house, saying that she is her "Aunt Memory".

"Aunt Memory" takes Kira to Crythe, a land where people are trained from childhood to remember everything that ever happens to them. Kira soon discovers that not only is her mother a prisoner in Crythe, but that many people are not who they claim to be. Mrs. Landon is actually Kira's real Aunt Memory, and the woman who had called herself "Aunt Memory" is actually Rona Cummins, an old enemy of Kira's parents who tries to obtain her parents' secrets. As Rona keeps raising the stakes, Kira must find a way to save Lynne, Mrs. Landon, and herself, as well as her parents' memories.

== Awards ==
Escape From Memory has won several book awards, including:

- A Junior Library Guild Selection, 2003
- A New York Public Library Book for the Teen Age, 2004
- Golden Duck Award (Eleanor Cameron) Middle Grades Winner, 2004

== Historical References ==
- The Russian journalist "S." (Solomon Shereshevsky) is given a fictional connection to Crythe, although he was a real person.
