= Double Identity (Haddix novel) =

2003 novel by Margaret Peterson Haddix

double identity
- First edition
- Author: Margaret Peterson Haddix
- Language: English
- Genre: Science fiction, Mystery, Suspense
- Set in: Simon & Schuster Children's Publishing
- Publication date: August 2003
- Publication place: Canada
- Media type: Print (Hardcover, Paperback)
- Pages: 218 (Paperback and hard cover)
- ISBN: 978-1-4177-7265-0

Double Identity is a 2005 young adult novel by Margaret Peterson Haddix.

== Summary ==
Mom cries all the time. Dad acts strangely and nervous. Suddenly, 12-year-old Bethany Cole finds herself in the car with them, frantically driving across several states in the dead of night. With no explanation, they leave her at a house in Illinois with a woman Dad calls Aunt Myrlie. Myrlie is visibly shaken to see Dad, and she's even more stunned when she sees Bethany. "She looks just like . . ." she begins. Mom and Dad, upset and weeping, drive off into the night, leaving Bethany with a stranger and a hundred unanswered questions.

Later, Bethany hears Myrlie talking to Dad on the porch of Myrlie's house. Myrlie says he has to tell Bethany about Elizabeth. Bethany begins asking questions, and Dad, who vaguely indicates by phone that he's in danger, allows Myrlie to tell Bethany about the past. Bethany learns that Elizabeth was her parents' first daughter, a sister she never knew existed. Myrlie is her mom's sister, and the two families lived near one another when Elizabeth and Myrlie's daughter, Joss, was young. Elizabeth and Joss were cousins, best friends, and Olympic gymnastic hopefuls. But around the girls' 13th birthdays, the two families made a road trip in which an accident took the lives of Elizabeth and Myrlie's husband. Bethany's mom, who was driving, always blamed herself for the crash. After that, Bethany's parents left town. Myrlie hadn't seen or heard from them in years until the night they left Bethany with her. Bethany is also shocked to learn that her father, whom she always believed to be some kind of money manager, used to be a doctor.

Joss comes from St. Louis to stay with Myrlie and Bethany. They watch old videos, and Joss is struck by how much she looks like Elizabeth. They don't just resemble one another; it's as though they were twins. During her time with her aunt and cousin, she discovers many ways in which she is similar to her dead sister. She also becomes increasingly aware the life she's been living is a lie. Her father sends a package containing several birth certificates for Bethany, all with different last names and cities of birth. He also sends wads of $100 bills. Myrlie, Joss, and Bethany can only speculate what Bethany's dad might have done for that cash or what kind of trouble he's in. Mom calls during one of her delusional episodes, creating more questions. She calls Bethany "Elizabeth" and says Dad believes if they save enough of her cells, they can clone her. Now Bethany wonders if her mother's ravings could contain any truth.

Around the same time, a man in a car with out-of-town plates starts following Bethany. Another incoherent letter from Dad indicates someone who just got out of prison is chasing him and hunting him down, so he can't come back. Joss and Bethany read a news article about a man named Van Dyne who was imprisoned for stealing money. His company was involved in cloning. Bethany recognizes the name of one of the fictitious employees through whom he supposedly filtered funds as an alias Dad had used.

Bethany's parents secretly return to town, but Van Dyne discovers them. The truth is revealed, that Van Dyne had paid Bethany's father to clone him. Now that Van Dyne is out of prison, he is searching for the version of him Dad had supposedly made. In fact, Dad had never made a Van Dyne clone but had taken the money to clone Elizabeth instead. The epilogue reveals that Bethany's parents are able to stay with her. Dad returns all of Van Dyne's money. Van Dyne has long talks with Joss; she says he is such a lonely man, he thought no one but his own clone could ever love him. He changes his ways and becomes a philanthropist. Bethany continues to learn who she is, apart from Elizabeth, and discover she is valued as an individual by her family.

== Characters ==
- Bethany Cole - The protagonist of the novel, Bethany is 12 years old at the beginning and turns 13 at the end of the novel. She has hazel eyes and blonde hair. She is Elizabeth's younger sister and clone, and the daughter of Walter and Hillary. She is an amazing swimmer, she loves to collect words, and she wears glasses. The last name changed from Krull to Cole, to help conceal her identity from the antagonist, Dalton Van Dyne. When her parents leave her at Myrlie's home, she learns about Elizabeth's existence and eventually realizes that she is her clone, explaining why her parents were overprotective and knew everything about her. Her birthday is Nov 2.
- Myrlie Wilker - Myrlie is Bethany's maternal aunt and Joss's mother. Because she is a kindergarten teacher, Bethany is left at her house at the beginning of the novel. Her husband was also killed in the car accident that killed Elizabeth Krull. She is, to Bethany's confusion, shocked when her niece wants to go swimming because Elizabeth hated swimming.
- Jocelyn Wilker - Better known as Joss, she is Bethany's cousin and Myrlie's daughter. She was Elizabeth's best friend and cousin and did gymnastics with her. She studied both biology and theology and is a female minister. She later helped Van Dyne open a home for troubled teenage boys when he decided to turn his life around.
- Walter Krull - Walter is Bethany's father. Throughout the novel, he goes by "Walter Cole." He was paid to create a clone of Dalton Van Dyne, but when Van Dyne was jailed, he used the money to clone his deceased daughter, Elizabeth.
- Hillary Krull - Hillary is Bethany's mother. Throughout the novel, she goes by "Hillary Cole." She seems unbalanced and calls Bethany at random intervals while Bethany is at Myrlie's. During these calls, she has a habit of thinking that Bethany is Elizabeth. Hillary feels guilty for the deaths of Elizabeth and Myrlie's husband because she was driving the car when it crashed.
- Elizabeth Krull - Elizabeth Krull was the daughter of Walter and Hillary. She is Bethany's older sister and died in a car accident on her 13th birthday along with her Aunt Myrlie's husband. She was an amazing gymnast, and wanted to go to the Olympics with her cousin Joss. She also hated swimming. When her parents signed her up for swimming lessons she refused to even dip a toe in the water because when she was 3 she almost drowned when Hillary and Walter took her to a public pool. She is different from Bethany because she is more confident and louder. She looks exactly like Bethany except for a small scar under her left eye.
- Dalton Van Dyne- The antagonist of the novel, he was first seen approaching Bethany when she scraped her knee while running away in anger. He drives past Myrlie's house several times throughout the story until he spotted Bethany reuniting with her parents at the Harvest Festival and was shocked to hear that his clone never existed and Bethany told him that she's Elizabeth's clone after he handed her father the money to clone him as mentioned in the novel. He was later sent back to jail and opened a home for troubled teenaged boys with Joss' help when Dalton decided to turn his life around for the better and refused to tell anyone about the cloning incident at the end of the story.

== Reception ==
Kirkus Reviews wrote "A surprisingly comforting resolution concludes this safe but compelling thriller. Bethany’s discovery of her own identity makes for a mystery well worth solving." Publishers Weekly described the novel as "timely" and noted "raises provocative issues about what makes an individual unique, with both compassion and clarity." Deborah Stevenson of The Bulletin of the Center for Children's Books wrote "readers will empathize with Bethany's determination to discover her family's secrets and to define herself even as they're glad they're not in her position."
