= Shadow Children =

American children's book series

Shadow Children Sequence
- Among the Hidden (1998); Among the Impostors (2001); Among the Betrayed (2002); Among the Barons (2003); Among the Brave (2004); Among the Enemy (2005); Among the Free (2006)
- Author: Margaret Peterson Haddix
- Country: United States
- Language: English
- Genre: Young adult fiction
- Publisher: Simon & Schuster Books
- Published: 1998–2006
- Media type: Print
- No. of books: 7

Shadow Children is a series of seven books by Margaret Peterson Haddix about a dystopian country which suffers food shortages due to a drought and the effects of the government's totalitarian attempts to control resources as a way to solidify its power. The Population Police enforce the government's Population Law, killing or imprisoning "shadow children," any child born after their first two siblings. In some cases, a parent may choose to forge a child's identification card so a shadow child can live a normal life.

== Inspiration and development ==
Margaret Peterson Haddix began writing Among the Hidden after discussions with her husband regarding if they wanted to have more than two children, which developed into conversations concerning overpopulation, the earth's limited resources, and China's One Child Policy. The conversations gradually led Haddix into creating Luke Garner, a twelve-year-old boy forced to live with strict controls and limited choices that result in him spending his life in hiding due to a government that said that he would not have the right to exist. Though Haddix had not intended to continue Among the Hidden, she began to explore other characters and other tangents in the subsequent six books in the series.

== Setting ==
The Shadow Children sequence is set in a country where the government has enforced strict population control laws in order to control overpopulation after environmental conditions have severely limited resources, particularly food. As a result, it is against the law for families to have more than two children; the law is strictly enforced by the Population Police, who are said to conduct raids specifically to find and punish families who have more than two children. The Population Police, due to its power, is usually corrupt and holds control over government policies. Unknown to the common public, the elite of society, known as Barons, have used their wealth and influence to live lavishly and circumvent the strict population and food laws. Due to these circumstances, the third (and subsequent) children of ordinary people are hidden and denied opportunities, often at great expense, and are denied the right to exist.

In creating the setting, Haddix did not specify the exact time and place for the story in order for readers to consider that the events could happen in the United States if droughts, famine, and extreme environmental changes occurred. Similarly, she elected not to give a precise time period for the story in order to encourage readers not to dismiss the plausibility of the events in the story.

== Publications ==
- Among the Hidden
- Among the Impostors
- Among the Betrayed
- Among the Barons
- Among the Brave
- Among the Enemy
- Among the Free

== Characters ==
=== Main characters ===
Luke Garner
The protagonist of Among the Hidden, Among the Impostors, Among the Barons, and Among the Free. He is the third child of a farmer and has lived most of his life hidden in his house with no company aside from his family. He has two older brothers, Matthew and Mark. After meeting Jen Talbot, the third child and only daughter of his affluent new neighbors, the Talbots, Luke begins to question his status as a third child and the world he lives in. He begins a difficult path towards living outside of the shadows, beginning with leaving the house he grew up in to live semi-openly. He uses the alias "Lee Grant", the deceased son of a prominent Baron family, after leaving his home to live in a boarding school. Luke gradually finds his own way to fight against the Population Police and honour Jen's legacy.

Nina Idi
The protagonist of Among the Betrayed. Her true name is Elodie Luria and she was raised by her grandmother and three elderly aunts: Zenka, Lystra, and Rhoda. While Nina initially appears to be an antagonist from the events of Among the Impostors, it is revealed her naivete and love for Jason Barstow resulted in her mistaken accusation as a spy for the Population Police. Throughout Among the Betrayed, she struggles with trying to save her own life at the cost of three much younger children. She subsequently joins Luke to stop the Population Police, demonstrating a strong sense of independence and bravery.

Trey
The protagonist of Among the Brave. Trey is timid by nature, having spent his whole life in a room, and was raised by an ineffectual mother and a father who encouraged Trey to read and learn by providing him with books. He is one of Luke's classmates in Among the Impostors and after attempting to save Luke from the Grant family, he must take initiative to save his captured friends with the help of Luke's brother Mark. He is very knowledgeable and intelligent as a result of spending most of his life in hiding reading. Though his recognized alias after coming out of the shadows is "Travis Jackson", he is reluctant to use the name and prefers to be called Trey; his true name is Trahern Cromwell Torrance.

Matthias
The protagonist of Among the Enemy. Matthias was raised by a homeless but deeply religious man named Samuel Jones along with two other third children, Percy and Alia. Samuel taught the children necessary skills to survive, including creating false ID cards, and instilled within Matthias moral values, such as not learning to hate others. As the central figure of Among the Enemy, Matthias and his friends are arrested by the Population Police; while they escape, Percy and Alia are injured and eventually separated from Matthias, who ends up being recruited into the Population Police. There, he must overcome his grief and helps Nina and her friends disrupt and destroy the Population Police's plans.

=== Antagonists ===
Jason Barstow
A student at Hendricks School for Boys, Jason is actually a spy planted by the Population Police as a supposed third child using the alias "Scott Renault" at Hendricks to expose potential third children, and, using Nina Idi's love for him, children at its sister school, Harlow School for Girls. After he is foiled in Among the Impostors, he becomes a marginal character working as a member of the Population Police. He was thought to have been killed but comes back, implying he had sufficient clout in the Population Police to not be punished for his mistake in Among the Impostors.

Aldous Krakenour
The commander of the Population Police, who later becomes the president after the suspicious death of his ineffectual predecessor. He appears in Among the Brave and Among the Free.

Oscar Wydell
Initially appearing as Lee Grant's brother's bodyguard in Among the Barons, Luke finds that Oscar's loyalties and intentions are always ambiguous and that he cannot be trusted. He made the real Lee Grant trust him when he was alive. While Oscar makes it explicit that he is rebelling against the government, he appears to be an opportunist and seeks power for himself by first destroying the Barons. After Mr. and Mrs. Grant are killed, Oscar disappears. He reappears in an unsuccessful plot to take advantage of the fall of the Population Police's regime in Among the Free, but is foiled by Luke's testimony as a third child before the general public.

=== Supporting/Minor characters ===
Jen Talbot
The daughter of an affluent Baron family and the third child of Mr. Talbot, Jen grew up with privileges and knowledge of the world as it actually is. She is critical of the Population Police and idealistic, seeking to bring a better world for herself and other third children through protests and demonstrations. She becomes Luke's first friend and after her death in Among the Hidden, her memory continues to influence Luke's decisions to bring about the world she dreamed of.

George Talbot
Jen Talbot's father, an influential member of the Population Police. He has two sons, Brownley and Buellton, whom he adopted after marrying his wife, Theodora. He does not support the Population Police's policies, so he works from within to try to subvert them. After Jen's death, Mr. Talbot provides Luke with a false identity in order to live more openly and also saves the lives of Nina, Matthias, Percy, and Alia. When the Population Police takes over the government, he is arrested as the leader of a rebel faction before being rescued by Trey, Mark, and Nedley and brought to Mr. Hendricks' home to recuperate. He is a key ally to Luke and his friends, but eventually believes that he no longer has the sufficient power to protect them any longer. He is the only character to have appeared in all of the books.

Mr. Hendricks
The wheelchair-using headmaster and founder of Hendricks School for Boys and possibly the associated Harlow School for Girls, schools that have been designed and structured to allow third children to live more openly. When the Population Police raids the two schools, he is left behind and lives in a cabin on the school grounds, surviving on a garden that Luke had the students build. His home becomes a sanctuary for those fleeing from the Population Police after they take over the government.

Percy and Alia
Two young children raised alongside Matthias, who will protect them no matter the cost. When their guardian, Samuel, is killed trying to defend the children at Jen Talbot's rally, Matthias and his friends are captured by Mr. Talbot and used to determine Nina Idi's true loyalties. They are injured and separated from Matthias during Among the Enemy and initially believed to be dead - Matthias is overjoyed to discover that they, along with Mrs. Talbot, survived. Matthias considers Percy to be the most intelligent of their trio while Alia is the most observant and resourceful due to her ability to discern situations much better than Matthias and Nina combined, thus being the most capable of escaping from most traps despite being the youngest of the three.

Smithfield Williams "Smits" Grant
The younger brother of the true Lee Grant. As the son of a prominent Baron family, Smits' life is filled with more danger than Luke realizes - to the extent that Smits' late brother Lee created fake IDs for both of them. After an assassination attempt that kills both of Smits' parents, Luke sends Smits to his parents to remain hidden. During this time, Smits adopts the identity of "Peter Goodard".

The Grants
The parents of the real Lee Grant, acquaintances of the Talbots. Though they donate Lee's name to be used for a Third Child, their inability to openly grieve for Lee's death after his skiing accident results in a selfish desire to bring Luke into their household and fake "Lee"'s death and then leave Luke to go back into hiding. The Grants are assassinated at the end of Among the Barons, using their last moments to save Smits from dying along with them.

Theodora Talbot
Mr. Talbot's wife and Jen's mother, Mrs. Talbot is a doctor. She has two sons, Brownley and Buellton, from a prior marriage. She first appears in Among the Brave; after meeting Trey, she abandons her home to live with Mr. Hendricks when the Population Police take over the government. She later appears in Among the Enemy to go with Matthias to rescue his two injured friends, Percy and Alia. Matthias assumes that she and his friends are killed by the Population Police, but is relieved to eventually learn that they all survived.

Mark Garner
One of Luke Garner's older brothers, Mark joins Trey in Among the Brave to rescue Luke, Mr. Talbot, and their friends after they are captured by the Population Police. He subsequently helps the Shadow Children to subvert the Population Police.

Matthew Garner
One of the brothers of Luke Garner. He appears in Among the Hidden and also at the end of Among the Barons when Luke brings Smits Grant home to Luke's parents' home to hide. He also appeared in Among the Brave when he was telling his brother Mark to go to bed.

Edna and Harlan Garner
Luke's parents who both appeared in the first book in the series Among the Hidden. They both think that the government is watching their every move; and is tracking them down by their computers and television. Edna hasn't mentioned Luke to anybody in letters (not even inside the family), because she's scared the government might read it. They're both very protective with Luke, but Luke knows that they are just doing it because they love him and want to protect him from the Population Police.

Joel Westing and John Abbott
Students at Hendricks School for Boys, they are two of the boys Jason Barstow attempts to betray to the Population Police in Among the Impostors. They join Trey and Nina to save Luke when he is brought to the Grant family. After being captured and then rescued in Among the Brave, they choose to remain with Mr. Hendricks. Their real names are Patrick Carrigan and Denton Weathers; before Jason's failed attempt to expose them, their aliases were "Samuel Irving" and "Travis Spencer" respectively.

Jonas Sabine
An ally of Mr. Talbot who appears in the disguise of a Population Police officer at the beginning of Among the Brave when Mr. Talbot's house is raided. He saves Trey by accident when Trey is able to understand the phrase "liber" (free), the code used by Mr. Talbot's resistance group. "Free" was also the password used for Jen's chatroom. Jonas is executed in Among the Brave along with other rebels.

Nedley/Mike
A rebel in Mr. Talbot's faction against the government, he appears, identifying himself as Nedley, to rescue Mark and then Trey as the two try to rescue Luke, Nina, Mr. Talbot, and the others from a Population Police prison. In Among the Enemy he goes by the alias of "Mike" while working undercover at the Population Police headquarters, aiding both Matthias and Nina.

Tidwell
Known informally as "Tiddy." A Population Police officer whose life is saved by Matthias in Among the Enemy. He helps Matthias as much as possible, but dies hours after signing Matthias up for the Population Police. He was killed after he confiscated fake ID cards that turned out to be coated in slow-acting poison.

Philip Twinnings
A former newscaster who returns on air when the government under the Population Police is finally toppled in Among the Free. He attempts to moderate the people expressing their opinions about the political state, but realizes the Population Police are already trying to reassert their ideology by blaming third children for everything. When Luke abruptly appears on stage with the announcement that he is a third child, Twinnings protects Luke and encourages him to tell his story to the world.
