= Among the Impostors =

2001 novel by Margaret Peterson Haddix

- Second edition cover
- Author: Margaret Peterson Haddix
- Cover artist: Cliff Nielsen
- Language: English
- Series: Shadow Children sequence
- Genre: Middle grade, Science fiction novel
- Publisher: Simon & Schuster Children's Publishing
- Publication date: May 1, 2001
- Publication place: United States
- Media type: Print (Softcover)
- Pages: 172
- ISBN: 0-689-83904-9
- Preceded by: Among the Hidden
- Followed by: Among the Betrayed

Among the Impostors is a 2001 book by Margaret Peterson Haddix, about a time in which drastic measures have been taken to quell overpopulation. It is the second of seven novels in the Shadow Children series.

== Main People/Characters ==
- Lee Grant /Luke Garner: Main character in the Shadow Children series. Goes into hiding at Hendricks School for Boys.
- Jason: Main antagonist in Among the Impostors. An undercover Population Police informant. Future character in the series.
- George Talbot: Recurring character from Among the Hidden. Father of Jen Talbot. He is also a double agent on the side of the Shadow Children inside the Population Police.

== Plot ==
Twelve-year-old Luke Garner is brought to Hendricks School for Boys by Mr. Talbot, the father of his dead best friend Jen. Luke is his parents’ third child and so is illegal under the country's Population Law; if he were to be caught, both he and his parents would be executed by the Population Police. After Jen is killed leading a rally to protest the Population Law at the end of the first book in the series it is no longer safe for Luke to remain in hiding on his parents’ farm. Mr. Talbot arranges for Luke to take the name and identity of Lee Grant – a boy who died just before the novel opens – and arranges for him to attend Hendricks, an exclusive boarding school. Mr. Talbot shakes Luke's hand as he leaves and slips him a note, which Luke hides in his pocket.

Having only ever met six other people – his parents and brothers, Jen, and Mr. Talbot – in his entire life, Luke is overwhelmed by the size of Hendricks, and the hundreds of boys who are always around him. He ducks into one class after another simply to avoid the teachers and monitors who patrol the hallways, and finds that no one will tell him what classes he belongs in, or what he should be doing. He is never alone and so can't read Mr. Talbot's note, and the first night in his dorm room one of his roommates (who he thinks of as ‘jackal boy’) bullies him until well after lights-out. For the next week Luke is miserable; he is frightened that he will give away the fact that he is an illegal child and be caught, he goes to classes he doesn't belong in to just to avoid drawing attention to himself, and he is bullied by jackal boy every night.

One morning Luke sees an open door that leads to the outside. When he is sure no one is looking he slips through it, and runs into the woods a short distance away. Luke looks back towards the school to make sure he hasn't been followed, and notices that the school building has no windows. He remembers the note from Mr. Talbot and reads it. During the last week he has convinced himself that the note will answer all his questions about how to survive at Hendricks, but Luke finds that it only says: “blend in.” Luke becomes angry and considers running back to his parents’ house, but in the end goes back to the school.

Luke begins to pay attention to everything and everyone at Hendricks so that he can devise a way to get to the woods every day without being caught. He learns how to navigate the school's many hallways and staircases, and after poking his head in every room in the school realizes that there are no windows anywhere. He also notices that many of the students behave strangely. Some sit and rock back and forth for hours, while others sleep all the time; the teachers pay no attention to any of it. Although he can't understand much of what he learns, after a week Luke feels confident enough to start going to the woods for a few hours each day. After he notices a raspberry plant growing in a clearing one day Luke decides to plant a garden, and spends the next few days cultivating it. He returns to the garden one afternoon and finds that it has been destroyed, and believes that other boys from the school are responsible. That night he hides near the door to the outside and when he hears some boys go through it, he follows them.

Luke follows the boys deep into the woods, where they are joined by a group of girls. Luke sees that the leader of the group from Hendricks is jackal boy, and as he listens to their conversation he realizes that they are all illegal shadow children, just like him. Luke announces himself to the group and after he is told that his garden was destroyed by accident jackal boy – whose real name is Jason – asks Luke to become a part of his group. Luke agrees, and learns that many of the shadow children in Jason's group are hall monitors at school, and that most of them – including a boy named Trey – are afraid of the outdoors. Jason gets Luke a list of the classes he should be attending, and Luke immediately throws himself into his studies. Jason says that since it is only a week until finals he will never catch up, but that Luke needn’t worry because Jason can fix his grades for him. Although joining the group has made things easier for him, Luke finds that he does not fully trust Jason, and spends every free hour studying anyway.

The night before final exams Luke is unable to sleep. He hears Jason leave the dorm room a few hours after lights-out and follows him. Luke overhears Jason talking on a phone, saying that no one knows he works for the Population Police. Realizing that Jason is a traitor and planning to betray members of the group, Luke knocks him unconscious and leaves him with the school nurse. Luke then calls Mr. Talbot — who works for the Population Police, but sabotages them whenever he can — and tries to tell him what is happening. However, Mr. Talbot doesn't seem to understand and hangs up on him. The next morning at breakfast, a Population Police officer comes into the dining hall and announces that he has a warrant for the arrest of illegal third children, but before he can read the names on his list Mr. Talbot arrives with Jason following behind him, in chains. Jason says that he can identify a number of illegal children, but Mr. Talbot convinces the officer that he is lying and Jason is taken away to Population Police headquarters.

That evening Luke is taken to the Headmaster's cottage where he talks with Josiah Hendricks, the founder of the Hendricks and Harlow schools, and Mr. Talbot. Luke learns that the schools have been set up as a first stop for shadow children after they come out of hiding and start living with fake IDs, and have been designed as a place where they can overcome the emotional disorders that have resulted from their having spent their entire lives in hiding. Once they have dealt with their fears and can fit in with others, they are sent on to the next school. Both Mr. Hendricks and Mr. Talbot believe that Luke is ready to move on, but Luke asks to stay so that he can help those boys like Trey who are afraid of the outdoors overcome their fear by teaching them how to tend a garden. Mr. Hendricks agrees and Luke starts helping other shadow children.

== External sources ==
- First chapter of Among the Imposters
- Google books
- Haddix Books
- GoodReads.com
