= Leaving Fishers =

Novel by Margaret Peterson Haddix

- First edition (publ. Simon & Schuster)
- Author: Margaret Peterson Haddix
- Language: English
- Publication date: 1997

Leaving Fishers (1997) is a young adult novel written by Margaret Peterson Haddix centering on a high school girl, Dorry Stevens, and her descent into and escape from a religious cult called The Fishers of Men.

== Background ==
Haddix's inspiration for Leaving Fishers was a newspaper article she had written about a local church that was accused of being a cult. She decided to write about a teenage girl who had left a cult-like religion, and explored what would draw her to such a group. Because of the book's religious angle, Haddix said it was particularly difficult to write.

== Plot summary ==
Dorry Stevens is a high school junior who is struggling to adjust to her family’s recent move from Bryden, Ohio, to Indianapolis, Indiana. She is deeply insecure, has a distant relationship with her parents, and is unsuccessful at making new friends. One day, a classmate named Angela invites her to eat lunch with her friends, and the group treats her warmly. Dorry later learns that they are members of the Fishers of Men, a religious group in Indianapolis. Angela takes Dorry under her wing and they attend Fishers parties and other social events. Dorry, despite being only somewhat religious, agrees to attend church services and later a religious retreat, where the leader, Pastor Jim, teaches her about God’s love and makes her feel valued for the first time. Enamored by this, Dorry agrees to be baptized and become a member of the Fishers.

At first, Dorry thrives in her experience. Angela, who is now her disciples, instructs her in her faith and Dorry now enjoys a vibrant social life and newfound faith, as well as self-worth. One month after joining, Angela proudly announces her hard work has earned her a promotion to Level Two, and despite initially celebrating with other members, Dorry quickly learns that much more is expected of her. Due to the fact that Dorry is slightly overweight, Angela instructs her to fast on Thanksgiving Day. She also instructs her to convert someone while Dorry is home in Ohio for Thanksgiving. Both efforts ultimately fail, and Dorry is deeply ashamed.

Dorry’s life begins to spiral. Angela brainwashes her into thinking she worships the false god of food and eating for pleasure is giving into temptation, so Dorry begins to rapidly lose weight. She hardly sleeps due to Angela demanding she attend multiple Fishers meetings and discipling sessions, as well as pray for hours on end. Her grades suffer badly, as Angela tells her that Fishers should be the most important thing in her life and that studying and caring about grades means she cares more about school than God. Angela also manipulates Dorry into giving her college savings to Fishers. During all this, Dorry alienates herself from her friends in Bryden, and her relationship with her family becomes extremely strained. Though exhausted and miserable, Dorry remains in Fishers because she fears going to hell. Several months after Dorry joins, an increasing number of Fishers begin to drop out, and the amount of new members joining decreases. Angered by this, Pastor Jim instructs the Fishers to stop love bombing potential members and instead warn them about hell, essentially frightening them into joining.

Inspired by this, and desperate to please the Fishers, Dorry decides to convert the Garringer children, the very young children she babysits multiple times a week. She describes hell to the children, telling them they will burn if they die without joining Fishers. The children are traumatized by this, sobbing to their mother. Furious, Mrs. Garringer fires Dorry and kicks her out of the house, and Dorry realizes what she has done. Though Angela insists that Dorry did the right thing and the Garringers will go to hell, a horrified Dorry quits the Fishers. As a result, the Fishers call her for days with various attempts to lure her back in before finally giving up. Though Dorry believes she is now going to hell, she does not attempt to rejoin due to her regret of upsetting the Garringer children.

Dorry is miserable and lost after quitting the Fishers, until she is encountered by Zachary, another former member. Zachary explains that Fishers is actually a cult, and they treat their devoted members like that on purpose to establish control. He also alleges that Pastor Jim used the offering plate and other contribution money by members to buy a mansion, essentially embezzling, as well as had sexual relations with many of the young female members, including Angela.

Dorry finally realizes that the Fishers were extremist and a fraud, and her life begins to improve. She manages to bring her grades back up and restore her relationship with her parents. Some time later, she returns to the Garringer house to apologize to Mrs. Garringer and her children. Dorry tells Mrs. Garringer that she is no longer involved with Fishers, that she is exploring what she believes now, and that she and Zachary have formed a support group of former Fishers to talk about what they’d gone through.

== Characters ==
Dorry Stevens
Dorry thinks of herself as an unattractive, friendless nobody. As a result of her father's factory job transfer, Dorry moves out of her tiny hometown and into the city of Indianapolis. She is befriended by Angela Briarstone, Brad, Michael, Jay, Lara, and Kim, and becomes involved in The Fishers of Men, a "religious group" that is actually a cult. Even while giving into the cult's high demands and swallowing her voice of reason, Dorry manages to befriend a family, Mrs. Garringer and her daughters Zoe and Jasmine, whom she babysits. Later she befriends a boy named Zachary, who has also broken free from the Fishers.

Angela Briarstone
Angela is a wealthy, beautiful blonde high school student fanatically involved with the Fishers of Men. She appears kind to Dorry but is really feeding her half-truths and lies to get Dorry to fall into the Fishers. She is mentioned by Zachary as one of the leader of the Fishers' "favorites," meaning she allegedly had premarital sex with him.

Brad
Brad is a well-off, handsome (with blue eyes and straight black hair), charming, and funny high school member of the Fishers of Men. Dorry has a crush on him throughout the book and confesses to Angela to have lusted after him. He unsuccessfully attempts to sway Dorry back to the Fishers after she leaves with a promise of a date.

Lara
Lara admitted to Dorry that, before becoming a Fisher, she was a promiscuous atheist from age twelve to fourteen. She was converted to Fishers by their leader, Pastor Jim, and is one of the more devout believers, desiring "to convert everybody on the planet." She later has a nervous breakdown and is put into a mental hospital. She has straight brown hair and a plain face, easily fading into the background.

Jay, Michael, and Kim
Dorry's Fisher friends. Jay is described as quiet and "cute...if you ignored his acne." Michael, like all the male Fisher friends, is described as cute. Kim, like Jay, is one of the quieter Fishers. The three have minor roles in the book.

Pastor Jim
Pastor Jim is the charismatic leader of the Fisher of Men cult. He is around five foot eight, skinny, with thick, stylish brown hair and mustache, and piercing green eyes. He has gathered many followers and is reported to have embezzled money and had sex with "probably...half the girls in Fishers," by telling the girls it's their sacrifice for God. He never attempts anything with Dorry.

Zachary
Zachary is a shy-looking boy and introduced as a scientific genius by Pastor Jim. Later in the book, after he and Dorry have broken away from the cult, they befriend the other. He is bent on getting the Fishers of Men recognized officially as a cult.

Mr. & Mrs. Stevens
Dorry's parents strongly disapprove of their daughter's growing involvement with the Fishers of Men. Mr. Stevens is a stern father and factory worker, and Mrs. Stevens, (first name Reenie), works at a nursing home. They had Dorry later in life than typically. Mrs. Stevens has a heart attack, but recovers.

The Garringer Family
Dorry first meets the Garringer family, (excluding Mr. Garringer), when the Fishers arrange for her to babysit the children. In order from eldest to youngest, their children are Jasmine, Zoe, and baby Seth. The Garringers are wealthy enough for Mrs. Garringer not to need to work, and thus she is able to pursue her interests in art. When Dorry is forced into attempting to convert someone to the Fishers, she tells Jasmine and Zoe, both young children, about hell and Fishers. Their and Mrs. Garringer's bad reactions to the attempt and Angela's following cruel words are the final straws for Dorry, and she leaves the Fishers of Men. Later, after she has left Fishers, she attempts to reconcile with Mrs. Garringer, discussing her feelings about the cult. Mrs. Garringer accepts Dorry's apology although she has by now hired a new babysitter. She also mentions that her children are no longer afraid of hell as she got a dog who they believe will "protect them" from hell's fire.

== Reception ==
The book was praised by young adult fiction reviewers. Kirkus Reviews described it as "tightly written, with well-drawn characters, and demonstrating insight into the psychology of belief and affiliation." Publishers Weekly called the book's greatest strength Haddix's "even-handed portrayal" of religious subject matter, and Ed Sullivan of Booklist praised the book's deeper treatment of crises of faith.
