= Among the Hidden =

Novel by Margaret Peterson Haddix

- Third edition cover
- Author: Margaret Peterson Haddix
- Cover artist: Cliff Nielsen
- Series: Shadow Children
- Subject: Middle grade novel
- Genre: Dystopian, science fiction
- Publisher: Simon & Schuster Children's Publishing
- Publication date: March 1, 1998
- Publication place: United States of America
- Media type: Print (hardcover and paperback)
- Pages: 160
- ISBN: 0-689-81700-2
- OCLC: 37588395
- LC Class: PZ7.H1164 Am 1998
- Followed by: Among the Impostors

Among the Hidden by Margaret Peterson Haddix is a middle grade novel published on March 1, 1998 and is the first book in the Shadow Children series.

The book tells the story of a fictional future in which drastic measures have been taken to quell overpopulation. In 2013, it was one of the ten most taught texts in United States' middle schools.

== Plot summary ==
The novel is set in a dystopian future in which families are limited to two children due to food shortages and overpopulation. The protagonist is Luke Garner, a 12-year-old boy who lives on a farm with his mother, father, and two brothers (Mark and Matthew). As a third child, Luke and his parents are in violation of a population law. Like all third children, Luke must spend his days hidden or away from public view so that he is not killed or imprisoned by the government. When the government cuts down the trees and starts building houses for the rich and elite behind the Garner's house, Luke is forced to stay indoors and is alone during the day.

One day, Luke sees the face of a child in a window of a Baron's house that he knows already has two children. The next month, he runs over to the house out of curiosity and is caught by the child he saw in the window, Jen Talbot. She reveals that she is also a third child. Jen introduces Luke to a chatroom for other third children. The participants call themselves Shadow Children. The two become friends, and Luke visits Jen as much as he can.

Jen, who strongly disagrees with the government, tries to persuade Luke that the government is wrong. Later, at home, he begins to feel guilty for taking up food and supplies that could be used for other people. Jen tells Luke about a rally. Luke refuses to go and tells Jen he is too afraid. Jen gets upset and tells him to leave. He is angry at her and wishes that the Population Police would shoot her during the rally, but he regrets having this thought. That night, she sneaks over to his house and they reconcile before she says goodbye.

The next morning, Luke is paranoid about what has happened. There has been no report of any rally. Growing more afraid of what may have happened to Jen, he breaks into her home again, but there is no sign of her. He runs into the computer room and logs into the chatroom. He sends a message in the chatroom asking if anyone knows what became of her, but there is no reply. A man steps into the room with a gun. He asks who Luke is and how he knows Jen. Luke reveals himself as a Shadow Child who is friends with Jen and demands to know where she is. The man, who is revealed to be Mr. Talbot, Jen's father, lowers the gun. He explains that Jen and forty other children were shot and killed in the rally.

The Population Police arrive and demand to enter the home as the government had begun to monitor use of the Shadow Children chatroom after the rally. Luke hides while Mr. Talbot defuses the situation. Mr. Talbot forges legal identification for Luke so he can run away, and Luke assumes the identity of Lee Grant, a child who lost his life in a skiing accident. At the end of the book, he begins attending a boarding school.

== Reception ==
Among the Hidden received many accolades:

- 1998, American Library Association, Best Books for Young Adults
- 2002, Pennsylvania Young Readers' Choice Award for Grades 6-8
- 2001, Sunshine State Young Readers Award for Grades 6-8
- 2001, California Young Readers Medal for Middle School/Junior High
- 2018, Bluestem Book Award Nominee
