= Because of Anya =

2002 novel by Margaret Peterson Haddix

First edition (publ. Simon & Schuster)

Because of Anya is a children's novel by Margaret Peterson Haddix first published on November 1, 2002. The novel is about a ten-year-old girl with alopecia areata, her difficulties in school, and the importance of friendship.

== Reception ==
The book was reviewed by Publishers Weekly and Kirkus Reviews.
