= Among the Barons =

2003 novel by Margaret Peterson Haddix

- Second edition cover
- Author: Margaret Peterson Haddix
- Cover artist: Cliff Nielsen
- Language: English
- Series: Shadow Children sequence
- Genre: Middle Grade, Dystopian
- Publisher: Simon & Schuster
- Publication date: June 2003
- Publication place: United States
- Media type: Print (Paperback)
- Pages: 182
- ISBN: 0-689-83906-5
- OCLC: 49681456
- LC Class: PZ7.H1164 Aj 2003
- Preceded by: Among the Betrayed
- Followed by: Among the Brave

Among the Barons is a 2003 middle grade dystopian novel by American writer Margaret Peterson Haddix, about a time in which drastic measures have been taken to quell overpopulation. It is the fourth of seven novels in the Shadow Children series.

== Plot summary ==
Things change when the Grants, a prominent Baron family who donated the name of their son when he died in a ski accident, decide to send the real Lee's brother, Smithfield Grant (a.k.a. Smits), to the school and visit "Lee". Smits is troubled by the death of his brother and tells Luke, the new Lee, his stories of times he and the real Lee spent together. But when Smits wants to get rid of his bodyguard, he sets the school on fire. After the fire, Luke is sent to search Smits's room and discovers two fake IDs in Smits's room: one with Smits' picture labeled Peter Goodard, the other with no picture and labeled Stanley Goodard.

Luke is soon caught up in a complicated web of lies in a world where he is completely unprotected from anything that will prove he is an illegal third child. He has no idea who he can trust, especially Smits and his bodyguard, Oscar, and as a member of the Grant family in name, Luke is in an incredible amount of danger. Furthermore, the Grant family selfishly desires to express their grief over the real Lee's death by faking "Lee's" death and sending Luke back into hiding once again.

The return of "Lee" (with a few changes made by the Grants' services) and Smits is celebrated by a party at Grant's house. At the party, Oscar attempts to assassinate the President, who started the war, and Luke, who is saved by Trey. The President was in a different location at the time. Smits's parents are killed by a falling chandelier. Smits, Luke, and some of Luke's friends escape, dropping Smits and Luke off at Luke's house. Trey grabs some documents which he thinks are important and which he will use in Among the Brave. Smits and Luke are then welcomed back by Luke's family.
