= Just Ella =

1999 novel by Margaret Peterson Haddix

- Author: Margaret Peterson Haddix
- Cover artist: Rene Milot
- Language: English
- Genre: Romance, Speculative fiction
- Publisher: Simon & Schuster
- Publication date: 1999
- Publication place: USA
- Media type: Print Hardback and Paperback
- ISBN: 0-689-82186-7
- OCLC: 39335853
- LC Class: PZ7.H1164 Ou 1999

Just Ella is a novel written by Margaret Peterson Haddix and published in 1999 by Simon & Schuster. The story is a retelling of Cinderella with a feminist twist and a different version of the happily-ever-after ending. The plot revolves around Ella, a beautiful girl struggling to find the true meaning of happiness. A companion novel, Palace of Mirrors, was released in 2008.

== Summary ==
Fifteen-year-old Ella Brown of Fridesia, now known as Princess Cynthiana Eleanora, is engaged to Prince Charming and living in the palace preparing for the wedding day and life as a princess. For the most part, she finds life at the palace to be dull, soon discovers the prince seems to be lacking in both charm and brains and laments the fact that noblewomen have virtually no power whatsoever. She despises Madame Bisset, who is in charge of her training, but makes friends with Mary, a young servant girl, and Jed Reston, who is standing in for his father (who had a stroke) as her history teacher. It is through him that Ella learns the rumors surrounding her engagement involving a fairy godmother and a pumpkin coach, and she tells him the truth.

Ella was forced into servitude to her stepmother, Lucille, and stepsisters, Corimunde and Griselda, after the death of her father. They receive news that the king and queen are holding a royal ball. Despite Lucille forbidding her from attending and giving her more than enough housework to keep her busy, Ella planned to go, mostly as a way to spite her, as well as search for a potentially better job than a housemaid. She managed to attend by wearing her mother's old wedding dress and glass slippers she won in a wager with the town's glassblower and getting a ride from a friendly coachman. Although Prince Charming was enamored by her, Ella had to run from the ball at midnight because it was the only way to catch a free ride home, though she lost one of her glass slippers as she left. The prince finally found her through the shoe fitting, although Ella did not realize Jed was also there assisting the prince, so he knew of her origins long before she told him. They have a falling out, however, when she thinks that he is using her to try and realize his dream of a camp for refugees of the Sualan war.

Increasingly dissatisfied with her life at the palace, and learning that she was chosen to be the prince's bride to keep the family lineage beautiful as opposed to true love, Ella brings up the possibility of breaking the engagement. When she does not back down from her request, however, she is thrown in the dungeon in an attempt to break her spirit. Madame Bisset also posts a monstrous jailer named Quog to keep guard over her, warning Ella that if she refuses to go through with the marriage after the wedding day, he will be allowed to do with her as he wishes. With the help of Mary, Ella digs her way out of the cell through the hole that serves as a toilet, steals some supplies and her father's books from Lucille's house, and makes her way to Jed's refugee camp, which he was given permission to build after Ella's imprisonment so he would not learn what happened to her. Upon arriving at the camp, Jed proposes to Ella, confessing that he was in love with her since they met but said nothing due to her engagement. She tells him to wait six months, however, so that she has time to sort things out and ask again. She works at the camp as a doctor, and then camp leader when Jed's father dies and he has to return to the castle. He writes from the palace saying that right after her escape, Madame Bisset suggested they use one of Ella's stepsisters in place of her for the wedding to make sure the incident does not get out. The prince went straight to Lucille's house and took Corimunde to marry him, and now they and her sister and mother are living happily at the palace. He also mentions that he does not want his father's position and may escape like she did, but wants to wait and see if he can use whatever power he has to end the Sualan war before he does. The book ends with Ella wondering about her future, the true meaning of beauty and happy endings, and realizing her feelings for Jed.

== Characters ==
- Ella Brown (also called Princess Cynthiana Eleanora or Cinders-Ella) – The 15-year-old protagonist of the story. She is a form of Cinderella. Ella is described as being very beautiful, free-spirited, witty, and kind.
- Jedidiah "Jed" Reston – The son of Lord Reston, and next in line to become the official castle priest. He first appears when taking over Ella's history lesson after his father has a stroke. Jed is very philosophical and often ponders life. He also falls in love with Ella. Like the Prince, he finds Ella very beautiful, but he can see her humor, courage, intelligence, and perseverance.
- Mary – A 10- or 11-year-old castle servant. Mary ran for help when Lord Reston fell ill during Ella’s history lesson. She and Ella become good friends and Mary assists Ella in escaping the castle. Also, Mary is a very loyal friend who always tells Ella the truth, except when she is asked about the death of her father. Mary states that he was killed in a tournament, but in reality he was beheaded for having an affair with the queen. Mary is somewhat insecure, as she feels that she is not pretty.
- Prince Charming – The handsome, selfish prince of Fridesia. Ella is chosen as his wife because of her beauty. Mary describes him as so stupid that he couldn't get out of bed without having someone there to tell him which foot to put down first. When Ella falls out of love with him, he acts violently toward her. At the end of the book he is married to Ella’s stepsister, Corimunde.
- Lucille – Ella’s selfish, cruel, and demeaning stepmother. She tricks Ella's father into thinking she loves his hobby; books. However, her true nature is revealed after their marriage, which breaks his heart. After Ella’s father dies, she immediately becomes hostile toward Ella and makes Ella her personal slave. She made Ella a slave once she got rid of the maids and other services around the house pleading they were not needed. When Ella is proposed to by the prince, Lucille tries unsuccessfully to flatter her. She has two daughters, Corimunde (who later marries the Prince) and Griselda. Both girls are exact versions of Lucille, only much heavier and not clever or sly at all. If Ella does something wrong she is sent to bed without dinner by Lucille.
- Ella's Father – Ella's father. He taught Ella to read and he himself is a huge fan of books. He travels to many places to find various types of books. Ella's father was killed before the book started by trying to cross the Sualan border for books and was mistaken for a spy.
- Madame Bisset – Madame Bisset tries to train Ella to become an elegant princess, but struggles in her training due to Ella's free spirit. She sees anyone who is not nobility as beneath her and secretly views Ella as another dirty commoner. She also has a strict adherence to palace decorum and etiquette, but also has a great amount of influence in the royal family and is a shrewd tactician despite appearing delicate and feminine. Her true colors show when she throws Ella in the dungeon to make sure she goes through with the wedding. She tells Ella that she had to work her way up into nobility and do terrible things without any regret while she is trapped there, but refuses to divulge more.
- Quog – Quog is an ugly, burly rapist who guards Ella while she is in the dungeon.
- Simprianna – Simprianna is one of Ella's ladies-in-waiting until she becomes Coruminde's lady-in-waiting soon after Ella escapes the Dungeon.

== Palace of Mirrors ==
Palace of Mirrors, also authored by Margaret Peterson Haddix, was published in 2008 by Simon & Schuster is the second book of The Palace Chronicles.

The plot revolves around Cecelia, a girl who believes she is the true princess of Suala, and her quest to claim the throne. However, Cecelia discovers that the pretender princess Desmia is only one of many – Cecelia, Desmia, and eleven other girls were raised individually by royal knights who all believed they were protecting the "true princess" in secret. In truth, after the king died, the queen had adopted thirteen orphaned girls after her own daughter was a stillborn. The girls were separated shortly before the queen's death, entrusted to the royal knights. Desmia's guardian learned the truth early on and placed Desmia on the throne while holding power for himself; he turned on his former comrades when Cecelia and the other girls attempted to claim the throne. Once the conspiracy is exposed, the thirteen girls rule Suala together, each focusing on her specialty. Ella makes a brief appearance in the book as she accompanies Jed to peace talks between Suala and Fridesia.

== Palace of Lies ==
Palace of Lies is the third book in The Palace Chronicles published in 2015 by Simon & Schuster. In the third book, Desmia discovers the reality of royalty is far from a fairy tale.
