= Running Out of Time (novel) =

1995 novel by Margaret Peterson Haddix

- Author: Margaret Peterson Haddix
- Genre: Young adult novel
- Publisher: Simon & Schuster
- Publication date: 1995
- Media type: Print (hardback)
- Pages: 184 pp
- ISBN: 0-689-80084-3
- OCLC: 32313823
- LC Class: PZ7.H1164 Ru 1995

Running Out of Time is a novel by Margaret Peterson Haddix, published in 1995. It was her debut novel.

An audiobook, read by Kimberly Schraf, was released by Listening Library in November 1998.

It was followed in 2023 by a sequel, Falling out of Time.

== Plot summary ==
Jessie Keyser is a 13-year-old girl from the village of Clifton, Indiana, in the 1840s. During a village-wide outbreak of diphtheria, Jessie's mother reveals it is really 1996, and Clifton Village is a tourist attraction. Also, there are cameras all around watching them, but there are some blind spots. Jessie's mother takes her to a blind spot for the reveal because all the adults were contracted to not tell the kids. Clifton is a replica of a historical village with the tourists hidden, watching the village's activity by video from under the ground. Originally it was much more lenient with its villagers when a man named Miles Clifton founded it, but is now very strict and prevents anyone from leaving. Her mother asks her to retrieve a cure now that her own sister Katie has taken ill; the owners of the attraction ceased to provide modern medical care to the villagers in order to preserve its authenticity. She tells Jessie to get the cure from a man named Isaac Neeley, who protested the opening of Clifton. Jessie's escape will be difficult because Clifton is guarded to ensure that none of the villagers leave or find out it is 1996. Jessie's mother shows her a hidden escape route that has not been sealed.

After Jessie escapes underground, she hides in the bathroom for the night and emerges during the day, posing as a tourist with other visitors. She learns that the Clifton tour guides tell the visitors that the residents get modern medical care and are free to leave whenever they want, something that Jessie knows to be untrue. She then sneaks away to the modern world and attempts to contact Mr. Neeley while discovering that 1996 is quite different from 1840. Jessie experiences somewhat of a culture shock and is frequently confused by the technological advancements of the 1990s. After getting in contact with Neeley, they meet at a KFC, then return to his apartment where he attempts to drug her. After he assures her that he contacted the health department to bring Clifton's residents proper medical care, she overhears a conversation in which he says she knows too much about the outside world and they may need to kill her, and that they should close Clifton Village to tourists immediately. It becomes clear that Mr. Neeley is actually on Miles Clifton's side. Jessie wakes up the next day and manages to escape his apartment through a window.

Jessie convinces local newspapers and radio stations to attend a press conference on the steps of the Capitol building. Baffled by Clifton's sudden closure, they decide to check it out. When the media arrives, Jessie begins to explain the situation but faints due to diphtheria, which infected her before she left Clifton. At the press conference, she learns the man she thought was Isaac Neeley is Frank Lyle, a scientist and business partner of Miles Clifton; the real Isaac Neeley had died a few years ago in a car accident. Jessie is taken to the hospital, and the reporters call the health department and state police, alerting them of the situation. Clifton and his allies are arrested and Clifton Village's residents are evacuated.

When Jessie awakens in the hospital, she sneaks out of her bedroom and finds Miles Clifton talking about the diphtheria outbreak in Clifton Village to news reporters on TV. It turns out that the entire plan was a science experiment where they would plant diseases in the hope that those with stronger immune systems would survive. This was done to try to create a stronger human gene pool that would be able to resist disease without the aid of medicine; the tourism was just a cover. She discovers that all of the children of Clifton Village have been brought to the hospital, as most of them had become very sick. Although most of the children recover, two die before help can arrive. Her parents have not been arrested like many of the other Clifton adults, but they will have to convince the authorities that they didn't put any of their six children in danger. Jessie protests that her parents were good ones, but no one listens to her except a journalist. Jessie's parents are allowed to only visit, but it is eventually decided that the Keyser parents may regain custody of their children. After Clifton Village closes, Jessie, her family, and the rest of the Clifton residents will live in 1996 with the rest of the world.

== Plagiarism allegation ==
Simon & Schuster, who published Running Out of Time, noted that the film The Village (2004) had a number of similarities to the book. The film's plot also features a village whose inhabitants choose to live in a manner reminiscent of the 1800s, when the year is 2004 and a young female protagonist escapes to acquire medical supplies.

== See also ==
- The Truman Show
- Truman Show delusion
- The Maze Runner
