= Among the Brave =

2004 novel by Margaret Peterson Haddix

- Second edition cover
- Author: Margaret Peterson Haddix
- Cover artist: Cliff Nielsen
- Language: English
- Series: Shadow Children sequence
- Genre: Middle Grade, Dystopian
- Publisher: Simon & Schuster
- Publication date: April 27, 2004
- Publication place: United States
- Media type: Print (hardcover) Print (Paperback)
- Pages: 229
- ISBN: 0-689-85794-2
- OCLC: 52335122
- LC Class: PZ7.H1164 Al 2004
- Preceded by: Among the Barons
- Followed by: Among the Enemy

Among the Brave is a 2004 middle grade dystopian novel by American writer Margaret Peterson Haddix, about a time in which drastic measures have been taken to quell overpopulation. It is the fifth of seven novels in the Shadow Children series.

== Plot summary ==
The fifth book starts off directly where the last book had ended, from the point of view of Trey, Luke's friend from Hendricks' School for Boys. After Luke Garner (Lee Grant) leaves Smits Grant, the younger brother of the real Lee Grant, in the care of his real parents, Luke's friend Trey finds himself at Mr. Talbot's front door preparing to explain all the recent events.

The car containing Trey's friends, Nina, Joel, and John takes off without Trey. The house is raided soon afterward and thanks to luck and his own vast knowledge from reading during his years in hiding, Trey manages to dive to safety behind a flowerpot. A member of the Population Police, who searches the porch, says liber (Latin for free). Trey's knowledge of Latin saves his life, as the raider reports that the porch is clear. After the raid, Trey sneaks into the house and encounters a hostile but stunning woman with bright red hair; she is none other than Mrs. Talbot. Together, they discover from a private news network that the government has been overthrown and replaced by the powerful Population Police. Defeated, Mrs. Talbot abandons the house and leaves Trey to fend for himself.

After sorting himself out and taking several obscure, important-looking documents found within the Talbot house, Trey sets out to find help, hoping to find Lee and the others. He winds up on the Garner farm and ventures out with Mark, one of Luke's older brothers, to find Luke/Lee and the rest of his friends. They instead find themselves at Population Police Headquarters, once the house of the Grants; Mark is captured and taken instead and Trey must sign up as a recruit to save him.

Using his own ingenuity, despite his own fears, Trey manages to save injured Mark by working out a deal with a Population Police guard. He was also able to save his missing friends and Mr. Talbot from execution with the help of a rebel named Nedley. The group finds safety at Mr. Hendricks' cottage and discovers the schools have been raided and emptied of their students and able-bodied teachers. Then the group is nursed back to health by Mrs. Talbot, who happens to be a doctor. Afterward, Trey presents the documents that he saved, despite several opportunities where he may have abandoned them. Mr. Talbot reveals that the documents conceal the identities of hundreds of Third Children with false identities and they decide to burn them to protect the children. But Trey wants to take the names and the responsibility. Trey snatches them away at the last moment, resolving to take small steps to destroy the Population Police from within along with Lee, Nina, the chauffeur, and Nedley.

== Reception ==
Booklist's Carolyn Phelan praised Haddix for "writ[ing] a compelling story, full of intrigue, danger, and adventure. The level of tension barely lets up, ensuring that can't-put-it-down headlong impulse to keep reading." However, Phelan noted that "the constant tension gives individual scenes less impact than they might have had in a book with more contrast."

On behalf of School Library Journal, Tina Zubak noted that "elements of the plot seem timeworn and not all of it is plausible", but concluded, "this book provides a fast and wild ride that will appeal to reluctant readers".
