= Among the Free =

2006 novel by Margaret Peterson Haddix

- Second edition cover
- Author: Margaret Peterson Haddix
- Cover artist: Cliff Nielsen
- Language: English
- Series: Shadow Children sequence
- Genre: Middle grade, Dystopian
- Publisher: Simon & Schuster
- Publication date: April 2006
- Publication place: United States
- Media type: Print (hardback & paperback)
- Pages: 194
- ISBN: 0-689-85798-5
- OCLC: 60515368
- LC Class: PZ7.H1164 Alf 2006
- Preceded by: Among the Enemy

Among the Free is a 2006 middle grade dystopian novel by American writer Margaret Peterson Haddix, about a time in which drastic measures have been taken to quell overpopulation. It is the seventh and final book in the Shadow Children series.

== Plot summary ==
Luke Garner is an illegal third child along with Trey, Nina, Matthias, Percy, and Alia. He has been working from within the Population Police at the stables in hopes of slowly overthrowing them and bringing about freedom. When he is chosen to accompany a sergeant on a mission to distribute new identification cards to citizens, Luke unknowingly brings about the catalyst of change when he refuses to shoot a defiant old woman and runs away, leaving his sergeant in the hands of a group of angry villagers who despise the Population Police.

After several days of surviving alone, haunted by the memory of his friend Jen Talbot, run-ins with a selfish stable boy who was with Luke and his sergeant at the time of the incident, and attempting to avoid the Population Police at all costs, Luke finds his way to another village filled with starving people. They save Luke from being executed by the Population Police when they arrive; one man in particular named Eli reveals that the village no longer cares about their own lives and will do anything to help those in need like Luke. In the past, Eli and other villagers willingly betrayed a family with a third child in order to obtain food for their own families. The villagers realize their wrongs much too late and found many of their family members taken away by the Population Police with nothing in return.

When people are heard coming to the village, Eli helps Luke escape with a quilt made by his daughter Aileen. Luke wanders into another village and discovers the Population Police has finally been overthrown. With many villagers, they travel to the government headquarters as large groups of people reveal and relate their own stories on television. Luke, on the other hand, is apprehensive and discovers Oscar Wydell, Smits Grant's former bodyguard intends to claim leadership and collaborates with Aldous Krakenaur, former Population Police leader, to blame Third Children for all the Population Police's crimes.

While the news broadcast originally intended to allow people voice their opinions, Luke sees that the leaders are already beginning to poison the unwitting populace with propaganda and it is impossible for any opinion other than one that blames Third Children for all crimes to be heard. Desperate, Luke rides one of the horses (Jenny, he called it in memory of Jen) onto the stage to avoid the security guards and voices his opinion and reveals to the world what he is saying is the absolute truth as he is a third child.

Protected by Philip Twinings, a prominent news anchor from before the era of the Population Police who had hoped that opinions could have been openly shared, Luke tells his life story (chronicling the events from the beginning of the series to the present) and the stories of his friends Trey, Nina, and Matthias, and of Smits and how Oscar was his bodyguard, and people come to realize that the government is undeniably at fault. Shortly after, the people discover that Oscar escaped with Krakenaur during Luke's speech.

Luke finally finds his friends Nina and Trey in the crowd and finds out that all his friends met up at Mr. Hendricks home. Luke thinks about all the things he's always wanted to do and realizes that it is all possible.
