= Universal Poplab =

- Origin: Sweden
- Genres: Synth-pop
- Years active: 2002–2009
- Labels: Wonderland Records
- Members: Christer Lundberg; Paul Lachenardière; Hans Olsson-Brookes

Universal Poplab was a Swedish synth-pop band founded in January 2002 by vocalist Christer Lundberg and producer Paul Lachenardière. The band's two members have very different backgrounds: Christer is an old-school synth-pop fan, influenced by acts like Soft Cell and Yazoo, Paul is a classically trained musician with roots in jazz, electronica, trance and techno. Each member’s creativity has taken various forms over the years. Christer also hosts his own daytime radio show five days a week on Swedish radio and has produced TV documentaries. Paul creates music and releases records in such varied genres as trance and nu-jazz.

== History ==
In 2003 Universal Poplab made their live debut at the Scandinavian Alternative Music Awards (SAMA), followed by a number of summer gigs. The SubSpace Encounter in Malmö and the support show for German synth-pop stars Melotron in Gothenburg.

In 2004 their debut album Universal Poplab is released by independent record label SubSpace Communications. On the album, one can find a wide spectre of music, from gentle love songs as ”Dice Roller” and ”Any More Than This” weaved between electrifying tracks as “I Can’t Help Myself” (with Paul as the lead vocalist) and “Days Astray” to floor fillers as ”Extasy” and the first single, the melancholic yet bouncy “Casanova Fall”. The record also includes a cover version of Morrissey’s ”We Hate It When Our Friends Become Successful” featuring the backing vocals of one of Sweden's most famous pop stars, Håkan Hellström. Lundberg and Hellström have known each other since they were 16, and the song is dealing with the dark side of having famous friends. Universal Poplab’s single release, "New Baby Boom" (featuring Nina Natri from Homy and ex-Fidget), gained a good grip on Swedish radio playlists.

Following three singles from "Uprising" – Universal Poplab released "Fame and Hate" onto the web with a viral video. The follow-up single "On the Run" is available as a free download from their official website, where the official video can also be viewed.

== Members ==
- Christer Lundberg
- Paul Lachenardière
- Hans Olsson-Brookes

== Discography ==
=== Albums ===
- Universal Poplab (2004)
- Uprising (2006)
- Seeds (2008)

=== Singles ===
- "Casanova Fall" (2003)
- "New Baby Boom" (2004)
- "Dice Roller" (2004)
- "I Could Say I'm Sorry" (2006)
- "Heart Apart" (2006)
- "Fire" (2007)
- "Fame and Hate" (2008)
- "On the Run" (2008)
- "Summer Struck" (2008)
