= The Missing (novel series) =

Novel series by Margaret Peterson Haddix

- Cover for Found, the first book in the series
- Found, Sent, Sabotaged, Torn, Caught, Risked, Revealed, Redeemed
- Author: Margaret Peterson Haddix
- Country: United States
- Language: English
- Genre: Young adult, Historical fiction, Science fiction, Adventure
- Publisher: Simon & Schuster Books for Young Readers
- Published: 2008-2015
- Media type: Print
- No. of books: 8 + 2 short stories
- Website: Official website

The Missing is a series of young adult novels written by Margaret Peterson Haddix. It tells the story of famous children from history stolen from their place in time by futuristic time travelers and accidentally sent to the 21st century as babies. Jonah Skidmore is one of the stolen children, and he, along with his non-adopted sister Katherine, must help return the missing kids to their rightful places in history and fix time before it is destroyed. The first book in the series, Found, was published on April 22, 2008. The series continued with book titles Sent, Sabotaged, Torn, Caught, Risked (originally intended to be titled Kept), and Revealed. The eighth and final book, Redeemed, was released on September 8, 2015. There are also two ebook short stories, Sought (which takes place before Risked) and Rescued (which takes place between Risked and Revealed). Haddix originally intended the series to consist of only seven books. However, she stated that she had trouble closing out the series in seven books; leading to her decision to write Redeemed.

== Books ==
=== Found ===
A thirteen-year-old boy named Jonah Skidmore had always known that he was adopted and had never thought much of it until he began receiving strange letters sent to his house. When Jonah's friend Chip, who received the same letters, learns that he is also adopted, Jonah, Chip, and Jonah's sister, Katherine, set out to find out the truth about their origins. They end up in the middle of an FBI investigation, people appearing and disappearing, and a strange tale from a woman named Angela DuPre, who saw a plane appear (and later disappear) with 36 babies on board. The three come to realize that Jonah and Chip are important missing children from history who were transported to the 21st century by baby smuggling time travelers, Gary and Hodge. Later, the trio are unknowingly lured into a cave, known as a time hollow, with all but one of the other 36 missing children in an attempt by the smugglers to take them to the future. After they have defeated the smugglers, another time traveler from the future known to them as JB (Janitor Boy) decides to send Chip and another boy, Alex Polchak, back to the 1480s, where they were originally taken from. While trying to stop him, Jonah and Katherine are accidentally taken along for the trip as well, leaving it up to them to save their friends and return to the 21st century. This sets the plot and the title for the following book in the series.

Found was released on April 22, 2008.

=== Sent ===
Cover for Sent, the second book.

Jonah, Katherine, Chip, and Chip's biological brother, Alex, have one warning of disaster before they are sent back to the Tower of London in the 15th century, with the promise that they can return to their home in the 21st century if they can repair history. They quickly discover that Chip and Alex's true identities are Edward V (king of England) and Richard of Shrewsbury, Duke of York, respectively. But before Chip can enjoy being the King of England, they discover that they are virtually prisoners—and that the boys' uncle, Richard, Duke of Gloucester, wants them dead.

The four teenagers foil an attempt by two men to kill Chip and Alex, but then must hide. The next day, they decide to cross the Thames to Westminster Abbey, where the boys' uncle, Richard of Gloucester, is being crowned King Richard III of England. Posing as angels, they terrify King Richard by telling him that his murder of his nephews means that he is condemned to hell, leaving him with a burden of guilt and terror of damnation that lasts throughout his reign. They visit the queen, their mother, in sanctuary at Westminster, intending to convince her of Chip and Alex's death, but instead Chip and Alex rejoin their tracers (which mark out the events of original time) and Jonah and Katherine are removed from time to a time hollow, where they and JB watch the next two years, from 1483 to 1485. Jonah and Katherine are sent to the Battle of Bosworth Field and manage to convince King Richard to give up his crown in favor of Edward (Chip), but he is killed in battle and Chip and Alex are almost killed before Jonah and Katherine manage to convince them to come home. They return to the time cave, and then go home. JB soon shows up at Chip's house and explains to him, Alex, Jonah, and Katherine that Chip was never meant to be king and that Richard III was meant to be a villain for the sake of furthering humanity's moral development, as the incident with his nephews had made the murder of children no longer acceptable as an option for those involved in governance. JB then tells the four that he wants Jonah and Katherine to help the next missing child, Andrea Crowell, return to her place in history.

Sent was released on August 25, 2009.

=== Sabotaged ===
Cover for Sabotaged, the third book.

In the third volume of the series, Jonah and Katherine return Andrea, identified as the missing child Virginia Dare, to 1600; she had been kidnapped while in the process of burying the people and animals of the Lost Colony of Roanoke, as per Croatoan Indian custom. To preserve time, she had to finish the job, otherwise the island's legacy would poison relations between the Jamestown colonists who would be arriving in a few years and the local Native Americans, causing the colony to fail.

During Jonah, Katherine, and Andrea's time journey, the device used for their time travel, called an Elucidator, is lost, causing the children to arrive at Croatoan Island in 1600 and uncertain as to where or when they are. They discover that a man visited Andrea and wrongly convinced her to type in a code on the Elucidator which made it disappear, telling her it would take her back to the day her parents died, so she could rescue them. Eventually, they discover that they made it to Roanoke Island in 1600, and go to Croatoan Island. In the process, Andrea saves a man from drowning, whom they discover is her grandfather, John White. Jonah, Katherine, and Andrea find that their attempt to fix time by sending Andrea back is being thwarted by a man who calls himself Second. Second is a projectionist (computer simulation and prediction specialist) for the time agency that may have messed up time forever. Along the way they meet two of the other missing children, Brendan and Antonio, who were mysteriously sent back to their original time by Second. While on Croatoan Island, Andrea changes time itself and is reunited with her grandfather as Virginia Dare. It turns out Brendan and Antonio are adopted Native Americans; Brendan is an African boy dumped off a Spanish slave ship, and Antonio is an orphaned Spaniard fled from service as a cabin boy,. They were both taken in by the Croatoan tribe and became excellent artists. Virginia Dare/Andrea completes her task and buries the bones on Croatoan Island, saving it from being a reminder of the plague that killed the Roanoke colonists and Croatoan Indians. Second appears and Jonah and Katherine are saved by JB, only to be hurled into another time (1611).

Sabotaged was released on August 24, 2010.

=== Torn ===
Cover for Torn, the fourth book.

Jonah and Katherine land on the decks of Henry Hudson's ship, called the Discovery, moments before a mutiny in the early 17th century. JB reveals that John Hudson, one of the kids stolen from history and Henry Hudson's son, is missing completely, and Jonah will have to play his part. Jonah and Katherine must survive being on the 17th century boat, with unlikely help from two of the sailors. Hudson is trying to find the Northwest Passage that would connect Europe and Asia by way of the Americas. During the mutiny, Jonah and Katherine, along with Hudson and his officers, are banished into the cold bay; but instead of the original version of history they remember, the boat returns for them, led by the first mate. When they find out that Second has disguised himself as Hudson's first mate and has murdered one of them, Jonah and Katherine have a harrowing time, and then relive the mutiny and banishment, except time splits, showing one version that they already lived (the return of the ship) and one that they live now (continued banishment, the original version). They escape the boat after a docking and manage to get into the Damaged Time of 1605. They save their friends Brendan, Antonio, Andrea, JB, and John White when Jonah rescues everyone from a fire in the Indian village of 1605. It then turns out that Second sent John Hudson to 1605. John Hudson, called Dalton Sullivan in the 21st century, was already in 1605, living in England. JB then concludes that Second unraveled time from 1605 to 1611, made his own new, alternate universe and is sealing it off completely from others. JB then sends everyone to the 21st century, where they can live in peace, for a while.

Torn was released on August 23, 2011.

=== Caught ===
Jonah and Katherine are in school when time freezes. They are subsequently transported to Albert Einstein's apartment in Bern in August 1903, just before his wife Mileva enters with a telegram from her parents in Novi Sad, Serbia informing them that their daughter Lieserl, who was left with Mileva's parents, is very ill with scarlet fever. As Mileva enters the apartment, she bumps into Jonah, who has commanded his Elucidator to make him and Katherine invisible; he drops the device, which has made itself look like a compass to disguise itself, and Mileva picks it up. Jonah and Katherine, still invisible, poke through the Einsteins' private papers after they go to bed, and then follow Mileva through the streets of Bern onto the train to Novi Sad in the morning. On the train, Mileva becomes aware of their presence. They then follow Mileva to her parents' house and conceal themselves in Lieserl's room. Then Emily, one of the other girls from the time cave, appears in the room, telling Jonah and Katherine she was sent back by JB, who told her she would find out what she needed to know when she arrived at her destination. Just before Mileva enters the room, Jonah persuades Emily to merge with her tracer as Lieserl in order to conceal herself. Mileva, demanding that Jonah and Katherine cure her daughter, takes Lieserl and leads them out into the nearby woods; she uses the Elucidator to render them visible and is chagrined to find they are only children. Emily, unable to endure Lieserl's high fever and shortness of breath any longer, then separates from the tracer, causing Mileva to go into hysterics until Jonah tells her that Lieserl is not dead, and introduces Mileva to Emily as Lieserl. When Mileva tries to show Albert the 13-year-old Emily, time freezes in 1903 as well, but not Mileva, since she skipped time to when Albert arrived. They are all sent, along with Emily, to a place outside of time, called a time hollow. Mileva freezes everyone there using the Elucidator and then watches her whole life, Emily's life, and learns English to understand how time travel works. Then she unfreezes only Jonah and allows him to come with her and save time. Jonah lets Mileva keep the Elucidator when she returns to her time, which allows her to later send her schizophrenic son, Tete Einstein, to the future as a baby, where he is cured of his illness and grows up to become JB.

Caught was released on September 3, 2012.

=== Risked ===
Right after Jonah, Katherine and Chip meet a girl named Daniella McCarthy, the four are kidnapped by a boy, Gavin Danes, and sent to 1918. It is revealed that Gavin and Daniella are Alexei and Anastasia Romanov, the youngest children of Czar Nicholas II. Everybody except Chip is arrested upon arrival; he rescues Jonah and Katherine and discovers that Yakov Yurovsky intends to kill the Romanovs. Yurovsky successfully lures the imperial family into the cellar and proceeds with the murders. Gary and Hodge, who tricked Gavin and escaped from time prison, try to send all of them, including Maria Romanova and Leonid Sednev, to the future as babies, but they escape, though significantly younger. They regain their ages. Jonah and Gavin are shot in the ensuing chaos, but JB appears and rescues Jonah and Katherine. Katherine later returns to save the others, including Maria and Leonid, but the four older Romanovs are killed. JB sends Jonah and Gavin to the future, where they are forced to stay while they recover from their injuries. It is shown that Angela is providing for Maria and Leonid's education and considering adopting them in the 21st century.

The book was released on September 4, 2013.

=== Revealed ===
Charles Lindbergh appears in the Skidmores' home, grabs Katherine, and vanishes. Jonah finds out that Chip, Andrea, and all the other children from the plane have disappeared as well. Jonah’s parents and all the other adults in his town have "un-aged" into 13-year-olds. Jonah is the only 'normal' person left, and must save everyone with the help of un-aged JB and Angela. Jonah accidentally makes another dimension when he delivers who he thinks is himself as a baby, but is really his twin brother that he never knew about, to his parents, thinking that they and he are trapped in a doomed dimension anyway. Jonah discovers Gary and Hodge's plot: they convinced a grief-ridden Charles Lindbergh, reeling from the kidnapping of his son in 1932, that Jonah is his son and that he could have him back if he went to the night of the time crash and took the plane of babies to the future, cleaning up their mess and creating separate dimensions (and, in their plan, unaging Lindbergh himself as well). He convinces Lindbergh to return Katherine as well as to betray Gary and Hodge, who are subsequently unaged into babies. Jonah's real identity as a missing child is finally "revealed" in this book; an orphanage baby from 1932 who was kidnapped to be passed off as Charles Lindbergh's son. Jonah finds out that the baby he saved was actually his twin (whom his parents named Jordan in the other dimension) and that though the dimensions were separate, they have now merged. The twins have no memory of each other, but everyone else they know does, since they were in both dimensions. Jonah tries to take the first step in bringing the family, including Jordan, together afterward by having a family hug.

Revealed was released on September 2, 2014.

=== Redeemed ===
Jonah learns that he was an orphanage child from 1932 and that he has a twin brother named Jordan. Wanting to help his strangely unaged parents, Jordan sends his entire family to the future rashly. Second traps his parents in a time hollow and Jonah, Jordan, and Katherine are forced to save a young version of Second, Kevin, from an accident in the past (falling from a fence at the airport the night of the time crash). They learn Second's story: having witnessed the appearance of the plane, he was kept around for the FBI investigation, but disabled from his accident. Gary and Hodge, acting for Interchronological Rescue, hired him as a spy and took him to the future to heal him; he later became JB's chief projectionist. The adult Second, frustrated with Jonah and Katherine, later traps them in a separate time hollow, leaving Jordan to save time by himself. In a time hollow, he watches the entire lives of his siblings and learns about their previous trips through time. Second reveals that he has been murdered and that he is only a hologram, and that the alternate universe he created was destroyed since he gave the secret of age-altering to everyone. After befriending Kevin, Jordan convinces him to help re-age the adults. In the process of doing so, Kevin himself is unaged into a baby. The two are captured by Curtis Rathbone, the CEO of the company that employed Gary and Hodge, who then reveals that he caused all the unaging. Jordan and Kevin are then joined by Jonah, Katherine, Chip, JB, Angela, and his parents. Everybody is frozen by Mr. Rathbone, but he is killed by Kevin's Elucidator. In the epilogue, Kevin is adopted by the Skidmores, and babies Gary and Hodge by Hadley Correo and Angela, bringing them up to 4 adopted kids (including Maria and Leonid from Risked). JB reveals to them that the time agency is sealing off time travel to prevent any more near-disasters, but secretly gives them an emergency Elucidator.

Redeemed was released on September 8, 2015.

== Shorts ==
2 E-book shorts have been released in 2013 and 2014 respectively, titled Sought and Rescued.

== Characters ==
=== Protagonists (in order of appearance) ===
- Jonah Skidmore - Jonah is the 13-year-old main character in the series. He is one of the famous children of history that were kidnapped by time travelers and accidentally sent to the 21st century. He is the adopted brother of Katherine Skidmore and the adopted son of Michael and Linda Skidmore. Jonah is helping to restore history caused by the kidnappings. He faces the struggle of figuring out who he is as one of the missing children of history. In Revealed, he discovers that while he was listed under Charles Lindbergh on the plane, he was not a famous kid in original time, and Gary and Hodge only kidnapped him to pass him off as Charles Lindbergh's son. Jonah has light brown hair and pale skin with occasional freckles. He also has big blue eyes and dimples. He is taller than Katherine.
- Katherine Skidmore - Jonah's one year younger sister and a main character of the series. Even though she is not a missing child of history, Katherine has decided to help Jonah. She also comes up with JB's nickname, which stands for "Janitor Boy." She called JB "Cute Janitor Boy" before she knew what he really was. Katherine is slim and has wispy blonde hair, brown eyes, and a ski-slope nose.
- Charles Haddingford "Chip" Winston III (King Edward V) - Jonah's friend and Alex's older brother. One of the missing children of history, Chip and Alex are particularly famous for their disappearance. Both boys' pasts were restored in Sent. He becomes Katherine's boyfriend after their adventures in Sent.
- JB (Tete Einstein) - A time traveler from the future who helps Jonah and Katherine restore time. He knows the rules of time traveling and guides Jonah and Katherine in many of their journeys. He is the son of Albert Einstein and brother to Emily Quinn (Lieserl Einstein). He was sent forward in time by his mother, Mileva Einstein, to a point in time when his mental illness could be cured so that he could live a normal life. He then grew up to become the time traveler Jonah and Katherine know as "JB".
- Alex Polchak (Richard, Duke of York) - Chip's younger brother. As one of the missing children of history, Alex has been adopted by different people than Chip. Less is known about Alex as he appears later in the first book and less personal information is given. His past is restored in Sent with Chip's.
- Angela DuPre - An ally of Jonah and Katherine. Angela was one of the few people to have seen the missing children before the event was covered up. In the prologue of Found, she discovered the missing children of history when she saw the babies inside of a plane at the airport where she worked. In Revealed she plays a prominent role of helping Jonah save time. She eventually, along with Hadley, adopts Maria Romanova, Leonid Sednev, and the baby versions of Gary and Hodge.
- Hadley Correo - A time agent from the future who sometimes works with JB and assisted Jonah and the others when they traveled to 1485. In Revealed, he played an important role in Jordan's adoption by the Skidmores. He eventually "moves" to the twenty-first century to be with Angela and their adopted family.
- Andrea Crowell (Virginia Dare) - Another missing child of history, Andrea is the famous Virginia Dare, the first English child born in the American colonies. She, along with the rest of the mysterious Roanoke Colony, disappeared during the years her grandfather, John White was gone. Her past was restored in Sabotaged. Jonah developed a small crush on her over time and the two began a relationship in the epilogue of Redeemed.
- Brendan (One Who Survives Much) - An obscure missing child, Brendan was originally a painter and a member of a neighboring Indian tribe. He was apprenticed by John White along with Antonio; most of their works were demolished in a fire, while the rest were taken illegally by time travelers. His past was restored in Sabotaged.
- Antonio (Walks with Pride)- Like Brendan, most of Antonio's past is unknown except that he was a painter and a member of a neighboring tribe to the Roanoke Colony. He was also apprenticed to White as a painter and later had most of his works destroyed in a fire. His past was restored in Sabotaged.
- Dalton Sullivan (John Hudson) - A missing child of history, the son of the explorer Henry Hudson who was put out to sea with his father during a mutiny in northwest Canada. Dalton never relived his past due to Second's interference but instead Jonah played his part in Torn.
- Emily Quinn (Lieserl Einstein) - Another missing child of history, Emily is Albert Einstein's illegitimate daughter. She was only briefly mentioned and presumed dead by scarlet fever after 1903, a year after her birth in original time. She is also JB's sister. Her past was restored in Caught.
- Daniella McCarthy (Anastasia Romanova) - Stolen from 1918 with her brother Alexei, Daniella is the youngest grand duchess and daughter of Czar Nicholas II. She was originally killed with the other Romanovs in 1918. She was the only one of the thirty-six kids from the plane that was absent from the adoption conference in Found, which resulted in her not learning about her true identity until the beginning of Risked, the novel where her past is restored. The short story Sought is told from her point of view.
- Gavin Danes (Alexei Romanov) - Stolen from 1918 along with his older sister Anastasia Nikolaevna (Romanova), Gavin is the only son of Czar Nicholas II and heir to the throne of Russia. Stricken with hemophilia, Gavin was originally a sarcastic, mean boy, who wanted to take Gary and Hodge's offer and go to the future, but changed his mind and befriended Jonah, Chip, Katherine, and Daniella. His past was restored in Risked.
- Jordan Skidmore - Jonah's twin brother who, like Jonah, originally died from starvation at an orphanage in 1932. He was kidnapped by Gary and Hodge in Revealed to trick Jonah into thinking the baby was himself, which would create a paradox and destroy time. He was rescued by Jonah and grew up in the twenty-first century in a separate dimension from most of the other characters. He is the main character in Redeemed.

=== Antagonists (in order of appearance) ===
- Gary and Hodge - The pair of original time kidnappers that gathered up all of the missing children in the first book. They are sent to time prison by JB, but Gavin releases them, not knowing the consequences. They are eventually unaged and adopted by Angela and Hadley.
- Second Chance (Sam 'Kevin' Chase) - Abused as a child by his father, he became an expert hacker and ran away from home at the age of 13. In original time, he died from injuries caused by falling from an airport fence, but witnessing the time crash led to him being hired by Interchronological Rescue and sent to spy on the time agency. There, he was JB's projectionist, before manipulating and splitting time in Sabotaged and Torn, resulting in him being fired. He has also gone back in time to "help" Jonah and Katherine. In Redeemed, the adult version of him is killed by Mr. Rathbone. The young version of him is rescued by Jordan, and he is adopted by the Skidmores.
- Curtis Rathbone - CEO of Interchronological Rescue, the company that steals babies from the past and sells them in the future to become rich. He employed Gary, Hodge and Second, though he was eventually betrayed by the latter. He was known to treat his employees poorly. He was killed in Redeemed and Interchronological Rescue was shut down by the time agency.
