= Don't You Dare Read This, Mrs. Dunphrey =

1996 novel by Margaret Peterson Haddix

- First edition
- Author: Margaret Peterson Haddix
- Language: English
- Genre: Young adult fiction
- Publisher: Simon & Schuster
- Publication date: 1996
- Publication place: United States
- Pages: 128
- ISBN: 9780689800979

Don't You Dare Read This, Mrs. Dunphrey is a 1996 young adult novel written by Margaret Peterson Haddix. It tells the story of high school student Tish Bonner through journal entries assigned throughout the year by her English teacher, Mrs. Dunphrey, and follows her as her life slowly begins to spin out of control through familial and social troubles.

== Conception ==
Haddix wrote this novel while pregnant with her first child. She works hard to embody her characters when writing and while she had a happy childhood, she was able to draw on newspaper reporting she had done with abused children. She described this writing as "almost like an exorcism--I did feel possessed by Tish's spirit."

== Summary ==
Tish Bonner leads a fairly average teenager's life. She has three best friends, Sandy, Rochelle, and Chastity, all of whom are described to have 'big hair and sit in the back of every classroom.' She has a part-time job at the local "Burger Boy" restaurant and lives with her brother Matt and their mother while their father is absent, presumed to have left the family. Despite this, Tish shows indifference to his absence, while their mother seems to be getting worse and more distant every day.

At the beginning of the school year in 1992, her English teacher, Mrs. Dunphrey, assigns journal entries, which Tish initially sneers at and attempts to get by on the bare minimum requirement of two entries a week. She talks casually about her friend Sandy's shoplifting habit and Bud Turner, Tish's co-worker who attempted to ask her on a date. She does this only because Mrs. Dunphrey has announced she will refuse to read any entry marked "Do Not Read This, Mrs. Dunphrey." Tish begins marking every entry as such to test Mrs. Dunphrey to see if she keeps to her word, and she eventually concludes that she does.

Soon, her father re-enters her family life before the holidays and begins warming up to Matt and Tish's mother, although Tish still remains frustrated and skeptical about him. On Christmas Eve, he hands out fancy presents while dressed as Santa Claus, which causes Tish to go over the edge and snap at him. He hits her and then leaves, much to his wife's despair. Tish soon learns that her father could only afford those expensive gifts by charging them to her mother's credit card.

Tish's mother becomes increasingly desolate after her husband's disappearance, and Tish and Matt begin to notice she has been skipping work and lying around all day. One day, Tish discovers that her mother has abandoned her children to look for her husband, leaving only a note assuring Tish that she knows Tish will take good care of Matt.

Tish's schoolwork slips as she finds herself the head of a household with very little means of getting by. She can't increase her hours at work after Bud Turner is promoted to manager, spitefully cuts back Tish's wages, and then fires her. Her little brother begins wetting his bed and regressing due to the absence of their parents. Food is running out with no money to buy it, and bills begin coming in that Tish cannot pay. Her mother sends no money, only a postcard saying that she found her husband, and the two of them are very happy. In the end, Tish's mother admits it was a fake.

Soon, Tish falls out with her friends, who don't understand her home situation and begin taking advantage of her. Tish begins shoplifting food from her mother's workplace to survive, sending back bills only half-paid, and looking for a new job, although no one is hiring. The electricity is turned off, and food is becoming scarcer and scarcer. Tish then gets a foreclosure notice asking for a $200 property tax or else the house will be repossessed, which will leave Tish and Matt homeless. Meanwhile, Sandy is finally arrested for shoplifting.

Finally, Tish marks April 29 Again, Really April 30 Very Early in her journal, "DO read this, Mrs. Dunphrey." In this last entry, she tells her teacher to read the entire journal and asks for help, so long as she and Matt can stay together. In an aftermath letter, Tish writes to Mrs. Dunphrey explaining that she and Matt were placed with her paternal grandparents in Florida, her parents were found and are now in counseling, and life is beginning to get better for her and Matt.

== Characters ==
- Tish Bonner: A sophomore in high school, who is 15 but later turns 16, and is the story's main narrator. She becomes the heroine of the book, forcing to take care of her brother. She works at Burger Boy, a local fast-food restaurant, helping to support her family.
- Matt Bonner: Tish's eight-year-old brother, whom she is very fond of, but sometimes very annoyed with. He begins wetting the bed due to fear and not telling Tish.
- Mrs. Bonner: Tish's mother, who is hinted to be an alcoholic. She is suffering from battered wife syndrome and is dependent on her abusive husband for everything, or else she feels depressed. This goes to the extent that she will go out looking for him, abandoning her children. She and Ray dropped out of high school when she got pregnant with Tish.
- Ray Bonner: Tish's abusive and absent father. He temporarily returns after he runs out of money and leaves once Tish yells at him. His parents later reveal that he exhibited behaviors associated with antisocial personality disorder, such as killing a neighbor's dog, not having a lot of friends, and a violent temper.
- Sandy: One of Tish's friends, who has a habit of shoplifting until she is eventually caught. Her father is a lawyer. Near the end of the book, not knowing Tish's situation, Sandy makes fun of Tish when she becomes dirty because of lack of running water, ending their friendship.
- Rochelle: Tish's other best friend and the "feminist" of the group. It is hinted that she is more Sandy's best friend than Tish's. She does the same to Tish near the end of the book.
- Chastity: Tish's friend, implied to be more of the 'voice of reason' for the gang.
- Mrs. Dunphrey: Tish's English teacher, the only adult whom Tish seems to respect.
- Granma: Tish's deceased grandmother, who taught Tish to crochet. Tish's flashbacks often throughout her journal to the times when her grandmother was alive and how she was present the day she died.
- Bud Turner: Tish's slimy co-worker, who attempted to ask her out on a date. She refused. When he becomes the new manager at her workplace, he gets back at Tish by cutting back her hours, then eventually flat-out firing her.
- Mr. Bonner's parents: They appear at the end of the book. Tish is angry at them at first because they were absent during her family crisis. They were purposely not mentioned by Mr. Bonner, because he was angry with them. They tried to contact the family, but he ignored them and used the money they gave him on beer and bar tabs. They are seen to be nice and supportive, taking the children into their Florida beach house when their parents are charged with neglect.

== Awards ==
Don't You Dare Read This, Mrs. Dunphrey has won several book awards, including:

- American Library Association Best Book for Young Adults, 1997
- International Reading Association/Children's Book Council Book Award, 1997
- A YALSA Best Book for Young Adults, 1997
- A YALSA Quick Pick for Young Adults, 1997
- A YALSA Popular Paperback for Young Adults, 2003
- Maryland Library Association Black-Eyed Susan Award, 1999
- Nebraska Golden Sower Award, 2000
- TAYSHAS High School Reading List, 1998–99
