= Uprising (novel) =

2007 young adult novel by Margaret Peterson Haddix

- Official cover art
- Author: Margaret Peterson Haddix
- Language: English
- Publisher: Simon & Schuster
- Publication date: September 2007
- Publication place: United States

Uprising is a young-adult novel by Margaret Peterson Haddix published by Simon & Schuster in September 2007. The novel is a fictionalized account of the Triangle Shirtwaist Factory fire. According to Maureen Paschal of The Washington Post, it "helps reinforce how immigrants have often struggled with hardship and unfairness".

== Summary ==
Bella, newly arrived in New York City from Calia, Italy, starts work at the Triangle Shirtwaist Factory. There, along with 500 other immigrants, she works long hours at a grueling job under terrible conditions. Yetta, a coworker from Russia, has been crusading for a trade union. When factory conditions worsen, workers rise in a strike. Jane, a runaway daughter of a wealthy businessman, who later works as a governess for Mr. Blanck (one of the owners), learns of the workers and becomes involved with their cause.

Bella and Yetta are at work and Jane is visiting the factory on March 25, 1911, when a spark ignites piles of cloth, leading to one of the worst workplace disasters in history, the Triangle Shirtwaist Factory fire. In the end, only Bella survives, by going onto the roof and climbing to a nearby building and out their exit. Bella tells her story to one of Mr. Blank's daughters, Harriet.

== Reception ==
In writing a reviewer for Publishers Weekly said: "[t]he portrayal of the fire, which killed 146 workers, and its legacy memorably drives home both the bravery of girls who stood up to the powerful factory owners and the highly personal cost of progress." While Kirkus kept their review curt by saying that "because of its length, the book requires a reader who can stick with it."

== Awards ==
- Ohioana Book Award for Juvenile Literature
- New York Public Library Book for the Teen Age
- International IMPAC Dublin Literary Award nominee
