= Uprising (Universal Poplab album) =

Studio album by Universal Poplab
- Released: November 29, 2006
- Recorded: 2006
- Genre: Synthpop
- Length: 47:00
- Label: Wonderland Records
- Producer: Paul Lachenardière

Universal Poplab chronology
Universal Poplab (2004)	Uprising (2006)	Seeds (2008)

Uprising is the second album by the Swedish synthpop band Universal Poplab, released November 29, 2006 through Wonderland Records. The album was preceded by two singles, "I Could Say I'm Sorry" and "Heart Apart".

== Track listing ==
1. "Soma Generation" – 3:38
2. "I Could Say I'm Sorry" – 3:38
3. "Fire" – 2:40
4. "Heart Apart" – 3:39
5. "White Night" – 3:29
6. "Black Love Song" – 4:46
7. "Vampire in You" – 3:34
8. "60 Is the New 40" – 5:00
9. "Go Back to Sleep" – 3:43
10. "The Message" – 3:58
11. "Sad Song" – 4:00
12. "New Beginnings" – 4:55

== Singles ==
- "I Could Say I'm Sorry" (2006)
- "Heart Apart" (2006)
- "Fire" (2007)

== Credits ==
- Christer Lundberg – vocals
- Paul Lachenardière
- Hans Olsson
