= Turnabout (Haddix novel) =

Book by Margaret Peterson Haddix

- First edition
- Author: Margaret Peterson Haddix
- Language: English
- Genre: Young adult novel
- Publisher: Simon & Schuster
- Publication place: United States
- Media type: Print (hardback)
- Pages: 200

Turnabout is a novel by Margaret Peterson Haddix, set in the future. It was first published in 2000 by the Aladdin division of Simon & Schuster, Inc. The novel switches between 2002 and 2085 by chapter.

== Plot summary ==
In the year 2000, 100-year-old Amelia Hazelwood was living in a nursing home, sick and tired of life. Content to die, she signs a document given to her by doctors at the nursing home with very little awareness as to what it is. However, she gradually begins to change soon afterward, beginning with the realization that she no longer needs her hearing aid and is able to swing her legs over the side of her bed again.

She quickly learns that she and several other nursing home residents had signed an agreement with Dr. Jimson and Dr. Reed to participate in a study for an experimental drug (PT-1) that reverses the effect of aging by making telomeres grow. All the residents at the nursing home had been given the drug and are now growing younger each day. However, because the drug is experimental, it must be kept a secret. While a second chance at life seems wonderful, when Amelia's first birthday while moving back in time arrives, she finds she cannot remember anything from the last year of her life when she was growing older. The residents realize that as they grow younger, their previous memories are disappearing and being rewritten with new memories from growing younger, even though the brain has plenty of neurons left for memory. It's then found out that it's like recording while hitting the rewind button. One man, afraid of forgetting his beloved wife's funeral where so many people said such nice things, is the first to request the Cure, a secondary drug that will halt his age at that exact moment. While the Cure works successfully on lab mice, the man immediately shrivels up, dies, and turns into dust when it is administered to him.

While the doctors continue to secretly find a way to make the Cure work on humans with little success, Amelia and a friend, Anny Beth, decide to leave the nursing home and live their lives together and experience the world as they grow younger and younger. They find themselves constantly on the move, as with each year, their un-aging bodies prevent them from keeping the drug a secret. By the time Amelia, now called Melly, is sixteen and Anny Beth is eighteen, they become increasingly anxious that they will soon be unable to live on their own and become infants. With the doctors now deceased and their descendants still trying to make the Cure work, Melly and Anny Beth must find someone they can trust with their story and will take care of them when the time comes. Even more distressing is when Melly and Anny Beth realize someone they do not know named A.J. Hazelwood is trying to locate them for information they don't want to disclose.

As Melly and Anny Beth try to stay one-step ahead of the mysterious A.J. Hazelwood, they are surprised to learn that she is a descendant of both of them and had been researching her family history. The two decide to take a chance and reveal the truth regarding their identities to A.J., who eventually believes them and agrees to accept responsibility for their well-being as they unage into childhood again.

== See also ==
- Telomere
- Unageing
