= Among the Betrayed =

2002 novel by Margaret Peterson Haddix

Among The Betrayed
- Second edition cover
- Author: Margaret Peterson Haddix
- Illustrator: Debbie Morn
- Cover artist: Cliff Nielsen
- Language: English
- Series: Shadow Children sequence
- Genre: Middle Grade, Science fiction, Dystopian
- Publisher: Simon & Schuster Children's Publishing
- Publication date: June 1, 2002
- Publication place: United States
- Media type: Print (hardcover) Print (Paperback)
- Pages: 156
- ISBN: 0-689-83905-7
- OCLC: 46872298
- LC Class: PZ7.H1164 Ak 2002
- Preceded by: Among the Impostors
- Followed by: Among the Barons

Among the Betrayed is a 2002 novel by Margaret Peterson Haddix, about a time in which drastic measures have been taken to quell overpopulation.

It is the third of seven novels in the Shadow Children series. Unlike the first, it is not told from the viewpoint of Luke Garner, but instead from that of Nina Idi, the shadow child who was arrested with Jason Barstow at the end of Among the Impostors. Unlike Jason, who was a member of the Population Police, Nina is another third child who became Jason's pawn. The Spanish Version is called Enter the Betrayed.

== Plot ==
Elodie Luria had left a dreary but emotionally comfortable life with her three aunts and grandmother. For the sake of giving her a chance to live out of hiding, they managed to scrounge together enough savings to purchase a fake ID and identity for her - "Nina Idi" - and sent her to live at Harlow School for Girls. After she fell in love with Jason, a boy at Hendricks School for Boys, she was accused of trying to find shadow children in her school and was arrested by the Population Police along with Jason.

She is given two choices from a Population Police official she calls The Hating Man. She is moved into a different cell with three other children, Matthias, Percy, and Alia, who are ten, nine, and six years old. They are shadow children who have been living on the streets. As Nina befriends them, she struggles with Jason's betrayal and whether or not she should betray her new cellmates to save her own life.

She chooses to help the three of them and all four children escape. They find their way to Hendricks School for Boys. The children hide by the outdoor garden until they are caught by Lee and Trey, who recognize her as Jason's girlfriend. Out of trust for Matthias, Percy, and Alia,. However, even when she gives them a chance to escape, they stay with her. The Hating Man reveals himself to be Mr. Talbot. He had put Nina through a test to see if she really was a shadow child and ready to take a side; she passes. Mr. Talbot also reveals that Jason did not betray her and is not dead, but is still working for the Population Police.
