= Annabeth Donovan =

American field hockey player

Personal information
- Nationality: American
- Born: May 19, 1995 (age 31) Pennsylvania
- Years active: 2013-2014, 2017–2018
- Height: 5 ft 5 in (165 cm)

Sport
- Sport: Field hockey
- Position: Defense
- College team: Princeton University

Ann Elizabeth Donovan (born May 19, 1995) is a former American collegiate field hockey player and U19 National Team member. She is best known for returning to Division I Field Hockey after taking two seasons off to give birth to her two daughters, Esmé and Adeline Davis.

== Personal life ==
Donovan is a native of southeastern Pennsylvania and attended Unionville High School, where she played field hockey, ice hockey (150+ goals and 70+ assists) and lacrosse. In high school, she played club field hockey with WC Eagles. Donovan was also a member of the U19 National Field Hockey Team, U21 National Field Hockey Team, and Junior National Indoor Team. During her time on these national teams, Donovan represented the United States in tournaments in Uruguay, Scotland, and Canada.

Donovan is a legacy of Princeton University, as her grandfather, two uncles and both parents attended Princeton. Donovan's two older sisters, Kaitlin and Amy also played field hockey for Princeton, and her younger sister, Claire, was previously a member of the Princeton field hockey team. The Donovans are the only known set of four or more sisters to have played the same sport at Princeton.

== College career ==
Donovan was a standout player from the beginning of her college career, playing in every game during her four years at Princeton and earning All-Ivy Co-Rookie of the Year Honors her freshman year. During her sophomore season, Donovan learned that she was pregnant. She gave birth to her daughter Esmé Elizabeth on July 6, 2015. She gave birth to a second daughter, Adeline Grace, on September 30, 2016. On September 1, 2017, Donovan played in her first game since giving birth to her daughters. Donovan concluded her college career on November 16, 2018, during the semifinals of the NCAA Tournament.

=== Statistics ===
Season	GS	GP	G	A	P	SOG	Sh
2013	17	19	1	4	6	4	7
2014	19	19	0	4	4	3	6
2017	19	19	0	1	1	0	2
2018	20	20	3	1	7	12	17
Totals	75	77	4	10	18	19	32
