= Claim to Fame (novel) =

2009 novel by Margaret Peterson Haddix

- First edition
- Author: Margaret Peterson Haddix
- Language: English
- Publisher: Simon & Schuster
- Publication date: 2009
- Publication place: United States
- Media type: Print (hardback)
- Pages: 272 pp
- ISBN: 1-4169-3917-2
- OCLC: 263146686

Claim to Fame is a novel by Margaret Peterson Haddix published by Simon & Schuster Children's Publishing in 2009.

== Reception ==
Kirkus Reviews wrote "The veteran writer has the ability to make her characters recognizable even with brief sketches, and she holds attention with the mounting suspense of Lindsay’s dilemma, especially when her choices turn out to be wrong. An intriguing and often exciting diversion for young readers." while Publishers Weekly said "If everything wraps up a bit quickly, Haddix nonetheless creates a thought-provoking story laced with themes of transcendentalism, self-centeredness, and the importance of human connectivity."
