= Margaret Peterson Haddix =

American author (born 1964)

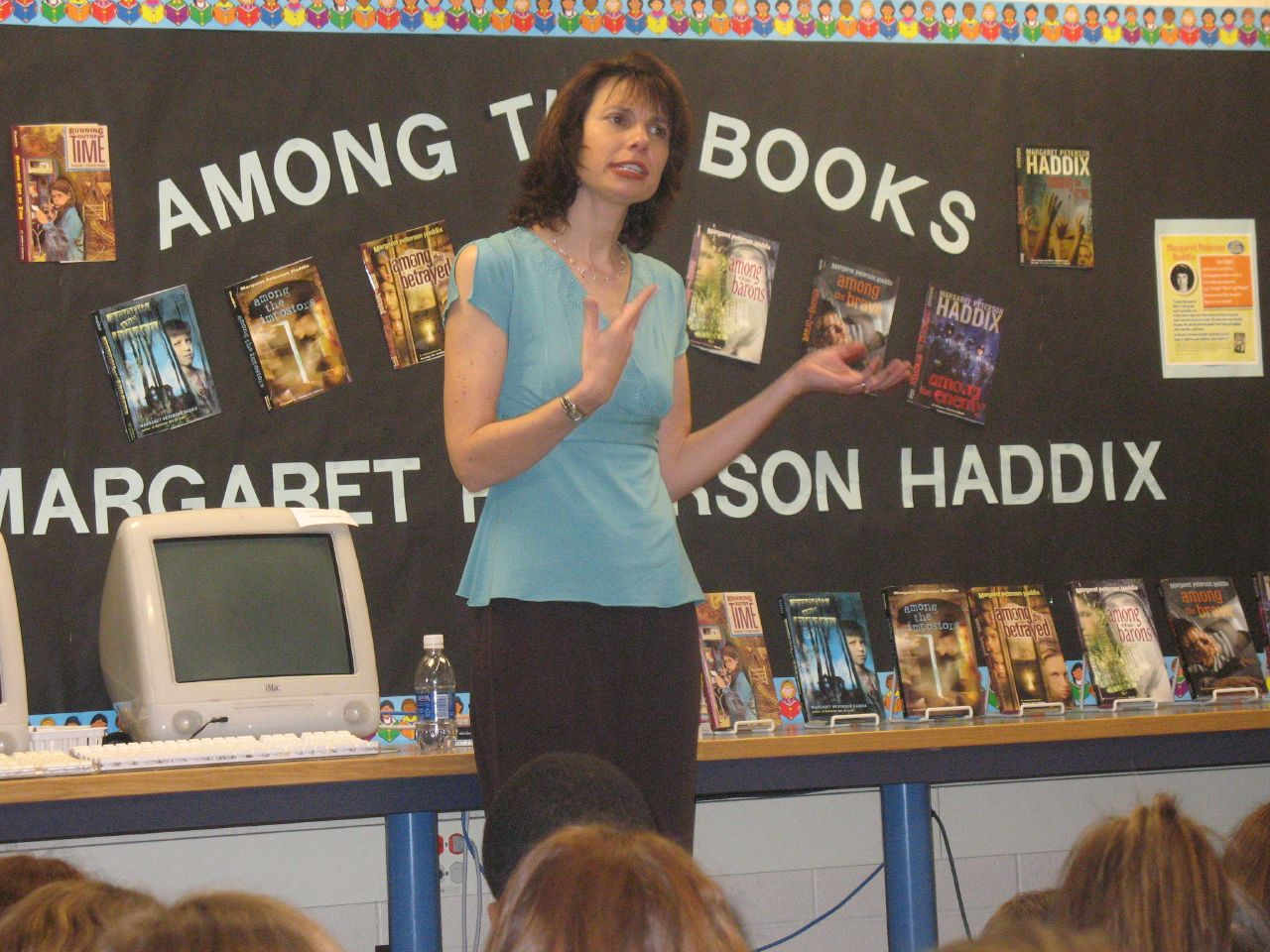
- Born: Margaret Peterson; April 9, 1964 (age 62); Washington Court House, Ohio, U.S.
- Citizenship: American
- Education: Miami University
- Occupation: Author
- Spouse: Doug Haddix
- Children: 2
- Writing career
- Genre: Young adult fiction
- Subject: Reading
- Notable works: The Missing series; Shadow Children series
- Website: haddixbooks.com

Margaret Peterson Haddix (born April 9, 1964) is an American writer known best for the two children's series, Shadow Children (1998–2006) and The Missing (2008–2015). She also wrote the tenth volume in the multiple-author series The 39 Clues.

== Biography ==
Haddix grew up on a farm about halfway between two small towns: Washington Court House, Ohio, and Sabina, Ohio. Her family was predominantly farmers and she grew up in a family of voracious readers. Some of her favorite books growing up included E.L. Konigsburg books, Harriet the Spy, Anne of Green Gables, Louisa May Alcott’s Little Women, Anne Frank, Rebecca of Sunnybrook Farm, and A Little Princess.

She graduated from Miami University in Oxford, Ohio with degrees in English/Journalism, English/Creative Writing, and History. While in college, Haddix worked a series of jobs. She was an assistant cook at a 4-H camp, but almost every other job has been related to writing. During college, she worked on the school newspaper and had summer internships at newspapers in Urbana, Ohio; Charlotte, North Carolina; and Indianapolis, Indiana.

Haddix chose to pursue fiction writing after her husband, Doug, became a news reporter, because she did not want to be his employee. Her previous work as a reporter inspired her to write fiction. After documenting a wide variety of topics, she wanted to create her own plots and characters. Haddix experienced a long period of having her writing rejected by publishers before her first two books were accepted in 1995 and 1996. Her first book was Running Out of Time, published when Haddix was pregnant with her second child, and her first child was one and a half years old. Her second book, Don't You Dare Read This, Mrs. Dunphrey, followed shortly after. The School for Whatnots, written in 2022, is Haddix’s most recently published stand-alone book.

Haddix has written more than 50 books for children and teenagers, including Running Out of Time, Don't You Dare Read This, Mrs. Dunphrey, Leaving Fishers, Just Ella, Turnabout, Takeoffs and Landings, The Girl with 500 Middle Names, Because of Anya, Escape from Memory, Say What?, The House on the Gulf, Double Identity, Dexter the Tough, Uprising, Palace of Mirrors, Claim to Fame, The Always War, Game Changer, Moonleapers, the Shadow Children series, and the Missing series. She also wrote Into the Gauntlet, book 10 in The 39 Clues series. Her books have made New York Times Best Seller lists and American Library Association (ALA) annual book lists and they have won the International Reading Association's Children's Book Award and more than a dozen state reader's choice awards.

The New York Times’ best-selling author currently lives in Columbus, Ohio with her husband, Doug, and are the parents of two grown children, Meredith and Connor.

== Bibliography ==
=== Running Out of Time series ===
- Running Out of Time (1995)
- Falling Out of Time (2023)

=== Shadow Children series ===
- Among the Hidden (1998)
- Among the Impostors (2001)
- Among the Betrayed (2002)
- Among the Barons (2003)
- Among the Brave (2004)
- Among the Enemy (2005)
- Among the Free (2006)

=== The Palace Chronicles ===
- Just Ella (1999)
- Palace of Mirrors (2008)
- Palace of Lies (2015)

=== The Missing series ===
- Found (2008)
- Sent (2009)
- Sabotaged (2010)
- Torn (2011)
- Caught (2012)
- Sought (E-book short story, 2013)
- Risked (2013)
- Rescued (E-book short story, 2014)
- Revealed (2014)
- Redeemed (2015)

=== The 39 Clues series ===
- Into the Gauntlet (Scholastic Publishing, 2010), Book 10 in The 39 Clues series

=== Children of Exile series ===
- Children of Exile (2016)
- Children of Refuge (2017)
- Children of Jubilee (2018)

=== Under Their Skin series ===
- Under Their Skin (2016)
- In Over Their Heads (2017)

=== The Greystone Secrets series ===
- The Strangers (2019)
- The Deceivers (2020)
- The Messengers (2021)

=== Mysteries of Trash and Treasure series ===
- The Secret Letters (2022)
- The Ghostly Photos (2023)
- The Stolen Key (2024)

=== Moonleapers series ===
- Moonleapers (2025)

=== Stand-alone novels ===
- Don't You Dare Read This, Mrs. Dunphrey (1996)
- Leaving Fishers (1997)
- Turnabout (2000)
- Takeoffs and Landings (2001)
- The Girl With 500 Middle Names (2001)
- Because of Anya (2002)
- Escape from Memory (2003)
- Say What? (2004)
- The House on the Gulf (2004)
- Double Identity (2005)
- Uprising (2007)
- Dexter the Tough (2007)
- Claim to Fame (2009)
- The Always War (2011)
- Game Changer (2012)
- Full Ride (2013)
- The Summer of Broken Things (2018)
- Remarkables (2019)
- The School for Whatnots (2022)

== Awards ==
Year	Organization	Award title, category	Work	Result	Refs
1997–1998	Maryland Library Association	Black-Eyed Susan Book Award, Grade 6–9	Running Out of Time	Won	
1998	Oklahoma Library Association	Sequoyah Book Award, Young Adult	Running Out of Time	Won	
1998	Arizona Library Association	Grand Canyon Reader Award, Intermediate	Running Out of Time	Won	
1998–1999	Maryland Library Association	Black-Eyed Susan Book Award, Grade 6–9	Don't You Dare Read This, Mrs. Dunphrey	Won	
2000		Golden Sower Award	Don't You Dare Read This, Mrs. Dunphrey	Won	
2004		Golden Duck Award, Eleanor Cameron Award	Escape from Memory	Won	
2004–2005	Triple Crown Awards	Lamplighter Award	Among the Betrayed	Won	
2008	Ohioana Library Association	Ohioana Book Award, Juvenile Literature	Uprising	Won	
2009	Buckeye Children’s and Teen Book Award	Buckeye Children’s and Teen Book Award, Grades 3–5	Found	Won	
2009–2010	Pennsylvania School Librarians Association	Pennsylvania Young Reader's Choice Award	Found	Won	
2010	Salem State University	Massachusetts Children's Book Award	Found	Won	
2010		Nēnē Award	Found	Won	
2011	Washington Library Association	Sasquatch Book Award	Found	Won	
2010–2011	Louisiana Center for the Book	Louisiana Readers' Choice Award	Found	Won	
