= Annabeth Robinson =

- Other name: AngryBeth Shortbread
- Occupations: Second Life Performance artist and Educator. Lecturer at Leeds College of Art. Creative partner of blueair.tv
- Website: www.annamorphic.co.uk

Annabeth Robinson, whose online Second Life alias is AngryBeth Shortbread, is a multi-media artist and lecturer based in Leeds, UK where she focusses on the teaching of audio, visual and online technologies. Using Second Life and other Multi User Virtual Environments (MUVEs), Robinson explores their potential as a medium for art and design practice whilst examining its educational potential. Robinson has been undertaking such projects since 2005.

== Career ==
Robinson is a lecturer at Leeds College of Art where she develops tools and techniques for using Second Life for educational applications including the widely used Metalab Whiteboard.

== Second Life Residency ==
Robinson works within Second Life to create interactive installations, and educative tools. On the Second Life virtual environment platform Robinson is known as AngryBeth Shortbread. She owns at least one island in the virtual platform, Second Life, which 'supports art and design practice either specific to a single course or to a range of courses'. Her avatar, AngryBeth Shortbread, has been listed as someone who has 'inspired with [her] creativity' by Wagner James Au, a reporter on Second Life. Robinson is also listed as an Educator, and Instructional Designer in Second Life by J Hiles in the TCC 2007 Proceedings.

=== Educational tools ===
Robinson has used her avatar on Second Life to create Educational tools.

MetaLab Whiteboard

The ubiquitous 'MetaLab Whiteboard' is an educative tool that was developed to improve the quality of education within Second Life. It is an interactive board 'that [a user] can pre-load with images'. These images can consist of either text or pictures which have a click through function to display.

HandShow Chair

In other projects for the MetaLab on Second Life, Robinson has created the Hand Show, or HandUp Chair. The Hand Show Chair, when sat on, raises an avatar's hand to be noticed by an avatar teacher.

=== Installation Pieces ===
Robinson uses Second Life as a platform to imitate real life mediums and transfer them into a virtual world. She manipulates everyday objects, such as coloured boxes within the virtual world of Second Life. This is to create a performance or interactive installation. One of Robinson's focusses has been on the manipulation of sound and instruments. In some installations a user's avatar can click or touch multiple boxes to create a unique compilation of sounds. As well as this Robinson has been focussing on 'the role of the avatar' and how it influences the space around it.

Ping Space

Whilst working at Leeds College of Art and Design as a lecturer, Annabeth Robinson contributed to the 'Kritical Works in SL' project (2008) with a project called Ping Space. The interactive performance consisted of two cubes being used in 'Kriti Island'. The aim of the performance was to create sound. This sound could only be created when one cube was placed on the ground and the other was placed 300 metres above, in the air.

The sound that can be created within the Ping Space project has been described as:

"a mixture of organic pink noise [...] water/wind and binaural beats – sine wave tones of sound that range from 7 – 30 hz difference. The type of beats and other sound design within the void is controlled by an external source outside of Second Life [...] Avatars flying around inside the void will also be sending data back out to the interface – effecting its presentation. Between these two spaces ping playful interaction – where each space's activity affect the other"
