= Del Duca =

Del Duca may refer to:

- Antonio del Duca (1491–1564), Sicilian friar
- Cino Del Duca (1899–1967), Italian-born businessman film producer and philanthropist
- Frank Del Duca (born 1991), American bobsledder
- Giacomo del Duca (c. 1520–1604), Italian sculptor and architect
- Marcello Del Duca (born 1950), Italian former water polo player
- Simone Del Duca (1912–2004), French businesswoman, and major philanthropist, married to Cino Del Duca
- Sergio Del Duca (born in 1968)

Musician (drum player) born in Argentina

- Steven Del Duca (born c. 1973), Canadian politician and former leader of the Ontario Liberal Party

== See also ==
- Prix mondial Cino Del Duca, an international literary award
- Simone and Cino Del Duca Foundation, a charitable foundation based in Paris
- Stadio Cino e Lillo Del Duca, a multi-purpose stadium in Ascoli Piceno, Italy
