= Duca =

Duca can refer to:

== People ==
- Duca (footballer), Adrualdo Barroso da Silva (born 1934), Brazilian footballer
- Duca (singer) (デュッカ), Japanese female singer
- Edoardo Duca (born 1997), Italian footballer
- Ion G. Duca (1879–1933), 35th Prime Minister of Romania
- Lauren Duca (born 1991), American journalist
- Michael Duca (born 1952), American Catholic bishop
- George Ducas (Romanian: Gheorghe Duca; c. 1620–1685), three times prince of Moldavia
- Constantine Ducas (Moldavian ruler) (Romanian: Constantin Duca; died 1704), two times prince of Moldavia

== Other ==
- DUCA Credit Union, a Canadian credit union
- a Romanesque title of duke, notably in Italian

== See also ==
- Del Duca (disambiguation)
- Lo Duca, surname
