= Dux =

Roman title

Dux (/dʌks, dʊks/; pl.: duces) is Latin for "leader" (from the noun dux, ducis, "leader, general") and later for duke and its variant forms (doge, duce, etc.). During the Roman Republic and for the first centuries of the Roman Empire, dux could refer to anyone who commanded troops, both Roman generals and foreign leaders, but was not a formal military rank.

== Roman Empire ==
=== Original usage ===
Until the 3rd century, dux was not a formal expression of rank within the Roman military or administrative hierarchy.

In the Roman army, a dux would be a general in charge of two or more legions. While the title of dux could refer to a consul or imperator, it usually refers to the Roman governor of the provinces.

In writing his commentaries on the Gallic Wars, Julius Caesar uses the term only for Celtic generals, with one exception for a Roman commander who held no official rank.

=== Change in usage ===
By the mid-3rd century AD, it had acquired a more precise connotation defining the commander of an expeditionary force, usually made up of detachments (i.e., vexillationes) from one or more of the regular military formations. Such appointments were made to deal with specific military situations when the threat to be countered seemed beyond the capabilities of the province-based military command structure that had characterised the Roman army of the High Empire.

From the time of Gallienus onwards for more than a century they were invariably Viri Perfectissimi, i.e., members of the second class of the equestrian order. Thus, they would have out-ranked the commanders of provincial legions, who were usually Viri Egregii – equestrians of the third class.

Duces differed from praesides who were the supreme civil as well as military authority within their provinces in that the function of the former was purely military. However, the military authority of a dux was not necessarily confined to a single province and they do not seem to have been subject to the authority of the governor of the province in which they happened to be operating. It was not until the end of the 3rd century that the term dux emerged as a regular military rank held by a senior officer of limitanei – i.e. frontier troops as opposed those attached to an Imperial field-army (comitatenses) – with a defined geographic area of responsibility. (Note: The earliest attested dux with a defined regional responsibility seems to have been Aur. Firminianus, dux limit. prov. Scyt ... – i.e. dux of the frontier troops of the province of Scythia – in the 290s AD.)

=== Diocletian's reforms ===
Under Diocletian, during the Tetrarchy, a new office called dux was created with powers split from the role of the governor of a province. The dux was the highest military office within the province and commanded the legions, but the governor had to authorise the use of his powers after which the dux could act independently and handle all military matters. The Dux Belgicae secundae ("commander of the second Belgic province") is an example.

Also the provinces were reorganised into dioceses with each diocese administered by a vicarius. As with the governors, the vicarius was assisted by a dux. This dux was superior to all other duces within the dioceses; when the vicarius called the legions of the dioceses into action, all of the legions were at the command of the dux. The office of dux was, in turn, made subject to the magister militum of his respective praetorian prefecture, and above him to the emperor. The Dux per Gallias of the diocese of Gaul is an example of this office.

== Byzantine Empire ==
In the Byzantine era of the Roman Empire, the position of dux survived (Byzantine Greek: "δούξ", doux, plural "δούκες", doukes) as a rank equivalent to a general (strategos). In the late 10th and early 11th centuries, a doux or katepano was in charge of large circumscriptions consisting of several smaller themata and of the professional regiments (tagmata) of the Byzantine army (as opposed to the largely militia-like forces of most themata). In the Komnenian period, the title of doux replaced altogether the strategos in designating the military official in charge of a thema. In the Byzantine navy, doukes of the fleet appear in the 1070s, and the office of megas doux ("grand duke") was created in the 1090s as the commander-in-chief of the entire navy.

The title also gave rise to a family name, the aristocratic Doukas clan, which in the 9th–11th centuries provided several Byzantine emperors and generals, while later bearers of the name (maternally descended from the original family) founded the Despotate of Epirus in northwestern Greece.

== After the Western Roman Empire ==
King Arthur, in one of his earliest literary appearances, is described as dux bellorum ("dux of battles") among the kings of the Romano-Britons in their wars against the Anglo-Saxons. A chronicle from St Martin's monastery in Cologne states that the monastery had been pillaged by the Saxons in 778, but that it was rebuilt by an "Olgerus, dux Daniæ" (who may have been the historical person around whom the myth of Ogier the Dane formed), with the help of Charlemagne.

Dux is also the root of various high feudal noble titles of peerage rank, such as the English duke, the French and Catalan duc, the Spanish and Portuguese duque, the Venetian doge, the Italian duca and duce, and the Byzantine Greek dukas or doukas (Gr. δούκας) (see Doukas).

Italian Fascist dictator Benito Mussolini used the title of dux (and duce in Italian) to represent his leadership. One fascist motto was "DVX MEA LVX", Latin for "[The] Duce [is] my light" or "[The] Leader [is] my light".

In pre-revolutionary Russia, the Dux Factory built bicycles, automobiles and aircraft in Moscow.

=== Education ===
- In Hong Kong, Scotland, South Africa, Australia, and New Zealand, dux is a modern title given to the highest-ranking student in academic, arts or sporting achievement (Dux Litterarum, Dux Artium and Dux Ludorum respectively) in each graduating year. This can lead to scholarships at universities. The runner-up may be given the title proxime accessit (meaning "they came next") or semidux.
- In Portuguese universities the Dux is the most senior of students, usually in charge of overseeing the praxe (initiation rituals for the freshmen).

=== Popular culture ===
- In RuneScape 3, "Dux" is offered to players as a choice of title alongside "Duke" and "Duchess".
- In Light Bringer of Pierce Brown's Red Rising Saga, "Dux" is a rank and title given to those who speak with the authority of their liege, as in the character of Holiday ti Nakamura.

=== Music ===
- In a canon or round, the term dux may be used to refer to the initial, or leading, part which first sings or plays the tune (with following parts being referred to as comes).
