= Dark Age (novel) =

2019 novel by Pierce Brown

- First edition cover
- Author: Pierce Brown
- Language: English
- Series: Iron Gold
- Release number: 2
- Genre: Science fiction
- Publisher: Del Rey Books (US)
- Publication date: July 30, 2019
- Publication place: United States
- Media type: Print (hardcover); E-book; Audiobook
- Pages: 784
- ISBN: 978-0-425-28594-7
- Preceded by: Iron Gold
- Followed by: Light Bringer

Dark Age is a 2019 science fiction novel by American author Pierce Brown; it is the second book of a tetralogy which continues the story of his Red Rising trilogy (2014–2016). Dark Age takes place immediately after the events of Iron Gold (2018), as the Society Remnant forces aim to take back Mercury from the Solar Republic. A sequel, Light Bringer, was released on July 25, 2023.

== Plot ==
Atalantia au Grimmus, Dictator of the Society Remnant, besieges the Solar Republic's Free Legions on Mercury after destroying their fleet in orbit. Three weeks after departing Venus, Darrow of Lykos arrives on Mercury with his team and rescues Orion from torture at the hands of Atlas au Raa. Atalantia agrees to Lysander's proposition of an alliance with the Rim, but requires both Lysander and Seraphina to fight in her attack on Mercury.

Atalantia's forces assault Mercury. In response Darrow has Orion create hypercanes using old terraforming technology—killing many of the invading forces of the Society Remnant, including Seraphina. However, Orion—driven mad by torture at the hands of Atlas au Raa —goes rogue, intending to scour the planet's surface to devastate the Society forces at the cost of the Free Legions and Mercury's civilians. When she refuses to back down, Darrow executes her, though tens of millions of civilians are dead by that point. Kalindora au San, Rhone ti Flavinius and his Praetorians pledge allegiance to Lysander, making him a political threat to Atalantia. Jealous, his childhood friend Ajax unsuccessfully tries to have Lysander assassinated. Accepting that Orion's storm has doomed the northern cities and seeing that Atalantia seeks to occupy resource-rich Heliopolis, Darrow has his forces ride the storm across the Ladon Waste to intercept Ajax. Briefly captured by Atlas, Darrow is saved by Colloway and Thraxa, and his forces repel the assault on Heliopolis. Kalindora and Rhone are captured by the Republic, Ajax flees, and Lysander is stranded in the desert.

On Luna, Virginia au Augustus urges the Republic Senate to come to the support of Darrow and the Free Legions, allying with Dancer to secure the necessary votes. However, right before the vote can occur, Dancer and his allies are publicly poisoned by an anonymous group—revealed to be the Syndicate. Publius cu Caraval, who acts as the unknowing puppet of the Syndicate, accuses Virginia of the poisoning and leads a deadly Vox Populi riot that massacres the Senate representatives that support Virginia, including Daxo. Lilath au Faran is revealed to have survived the events of Morning Star and to be the mysterious Queen of the Syndicate. Virginia, Sevro, and many Howlers are captured. Publius publicly executes many of Virginia's allies, including Theodora, but Quicksilver, Kavax and Holiday escape. Lilath installs Publius as a puppet ruler and reveals that the Syndicate's rise to power was orchestrated by the now 10-year old clone of Adrius au Augustus, who is being carefully molded into a mirror of the original Adrius. Virginia escapes and is rescued by Holiday's strike team, but is unable to escape along with Sevro, leaving him on Luna.

Victra has the mercenary, Figment, kidnap Lyria and Volga. In the wake of their shuttle's crash, Ephraim, Pax and Electra are captured by Sefi's Obsidians. Sefi has been fatally poisoned by Atalantia, and she needs Volga, revealed to be Ragnar's daughter, as her heir to realize her dream of an Obsidian homeland on Mars. She plans to barter the children for Volga. With Ephraim's guidance, Sefi's Obsidians capture many of Mars' helium mines from Quicksilver. After a celebratory dragon hunt, the mysterious Obsidian Volsung Fá and the Ascommani—Obsidians who lived outside the society's control—of the Kuiper Belt surprise Ephraim, killing the popular young Obsidian Freihild, who had been sleeping with Sefi's husband, and framing Sefi as having done it out of jealousy. Freihild's death sparks widespread discontent for Sefi's rule.

Above Mars, the Ascomanni attack Victra's flagship Pandora to find Volga, attempting to frame Sefi for the attack. Many onboard are killed, but Victra, Volga, Lyria and Figment crash on Mars. Fearing Sefi's imminent downfall, Ephraim escapes the Obsidians with Pax and Electra. Not trusting the Republic after Publius' coup, Pax suggests they seek out Victra. Figment dies from wounds sustained in the crash, but a mysterious parasitic device detaches from her and enters Lyria. Victra gives birth to a son, Ulysses. Harmony's Red Hand track the group, brutally kill the newborn Ulysses, and capture Victra and Volga. With the help of the device, Lyria infiltrates the Red Hand base, freeing Victra, Volga, and many enslaved prisoners. Lyria and Victra feed Harmony to pitvipers. To defeat the Red Hand, Lyria seeks help from Mars' civilians, who arrive after Pax boosts Lyria's distress call. Pax and Ephraim lead the response, ending the threat of the Red Hand. Victra reunites with Electra and Pax, though Volga has to stop Victra from killing Ephraim.

Ephraim, knowing both Sefi and Volsung Fá seek Volga, returns to Olympia to warn Sefi of her servant Xenophon's duplicity. Xenophon admits to being an agent of Atlas and Fá, as well as having manipulated the male Obsidians to turn on Sefi. Fá arrives, declares himself father of Ragnar and Sefi and challenges Sefi to a duel, killing her. Fá orders Ephraim's execution, but Ephraim triggers a bomb designed by Pax, killing Xenophon. Fá survives and kills Ephraim, then unleashes the Obsidians to brutalize Martian cities.

Atlas' Gorgons capture Lysander and Alexandar—who has been mistaken as a gold of the Solar Republic—who survived the floods caused by Orion's earlier rebellion. In a bid to prevent Atalantia's planned chemical genocide, Atlas allows Lysander to escape and deliver Atlas to Heliopolis. Darrow belatedly identifies Lysander, who has Glirastes activate an EMP device that cripples Darrow's forces. Lysander kills Alexandar and leads the civilians of Heliopolis in rebellion, freeing Society prisoners-of-war including Kalindora and Rhone. Lysander and Atalantia's forces defeat Darrow's, liberating Atlas, but Kalindora is grievously injured. Preparing to make their last stand, Darrow and his top commanders are rescued and evacuated by Cassius, who had survived his trial and been held captive by Diomedes before escaping to the Solar Republic. Kavax sent him to rescue Darrow, should the Senate abandon the Free Legions, and Cassius pledges himself to the Republic.

Virginia and her allies return to Mars, where Kieran grants Virginia emergency powers of war. Pax reunites with Virginia, but the Republic believes Darrow dead. Volga surrenders herself to Fá to save Mars from the Obsidians, who leave the planet. Pax, aware of Lyria's device, gives her a mission. On Mercury, Atalantia arranges for Lysander's assassination, but relents when he publicly acknowledges her authority and proposes marriage. She agrees and sleeps with him, enraging Ajax. On her deathbed, Kalindora reveals to Lysander that Octavia had ordered Atalantia and Kalindora to murder his parents, as his mother had planned to overthrow Octavia, recognizing her as a corrupt tyrant. Diomedes and Ajax capture Earth and Lysander secretly allies with Apollonius, promising him the lives of his betrayers—Atalantia, Ajax and Atlas—as well as Darrow, in exchange for his support in reestablishing the Society, with Lysander as its Sovereign.

== Characters ==
The Solar Republic

- Darrow of Lykos, a.k.a. the "Reaper" and the "Morning Star" (Originally a Red, now a Gold): a Red physically remade into a Gold to infiltrate and destroy the Society. The former ArchImperator of the new Solar Republic, now commander of the marooned Free Legions on Mercury.
- Virginia au Augustus, a.k.a. "Mustang" and "Lionheart" (Gold): reigning Sovereign of the Solar Republic; daughter of the former ArchGovernor of Mars, Darrow's wife, and mother of their son Pax.
- Pax (Gold/Red): son of Darrow and Virginia
- Kieran of Lykos (Red): brother of Darrow, a Howler.
- Rhonna of Lykos (Red): daughter of Kieran, lancer to Darrow, a Howler
- Sevro au Barca, a.k.a. "Goblin" and "Ares" (Gold): Imperator of the Republic, Darrow's best friend and second-in-command.
- Victra au Barca (Gold): Darrow's former lieutenant, Sevro's wife, and a wealthy shipping magnate in the Solar Republic.
- Electra au Barca (Gold): eldest daughter of Sevro and Victra
- Dancer O'Faran (Red): Darrow's former mentor in the Sons of Ares, now a powerful senator in the Republic and leader of the Vox Populi, a socialist faction opposing Virginia
- Kavax au Telemanus (Gold): longtime ally to Virginia and Darrow, Primus of House Telemanus, father of Daxo, Thraxa, and the deceased Pax au Telemanus
- Niobe au Telemanus (Gold): Kavax's wife
- Daxo au Telemanus (Gold): son and heir to Kavax, Tribune of the Gold bloc in the Solar Republic, ally of Virginia.
- Thraxa au Telemanus (Gold): Praetor of the Free Legions, daughter of Kavax and Niobe, one of Darrow's trusted Howlers.
- Alexandar au Arcos (Gold): eldest grandson and heir of Lorn, lancer to Darrow, a Howler
- Cadus Harnassus (Orange): Imperator of the Republic, second in command of the Free Legions
- Orion xe Aquarii (Blue): Navarch of the Republic, Imperator of the White Fleet, longtime ally of Darrow
- Colloway xe Char (Blue): Pilot, reigning kill-leader of the Republic Navy, a Howler
- Glirastes the Master Maker (Orange): Mercurian architect and inventor
- Holiday ti Nakamura (Gray): Dux of Virginia's Lionguard, sister of Trigg, Centurion of the Pegasus Legion
- Regulus ag Sun, a.k.a. "Quicksilver" (Silver): the richest man in the Solar System, head of Sun Industries and co-founder of the Sons of Ares.
- Publius cu Caraval (Copper): Tribune of the Copper bloc in the Senate
- Theodora (Pink): Leader of the Splinter Operatives, Virginia's spymaster, a former Rose (high-level prostitute)
- Zan (Blue): ArchImperator of the Republic following Darrow's removal, commander of Luna's defense fleet
- Clown (Gold): a Howler
- Pebble (Gold): a Howler
- Min-Min (Red): sniper, munitions expert, a Howler
- Screwface (Gold): a Howler
- Marbles (Green): hacker, a Howler
- Tongueless (Obsidian): former prisoner of Deepgrave, ally of Darrow
- Felix au Daan (Gold): bodyguard to Darrow

The Society Remnant

- Atalantia au Grimmus (Gold): Dictator of the Society, the Ash Lord's sole remaining daughter, sister to Aja and Moira au Grimmus.
- Lysander au Lune (Gold): grandson and heir to former Sovereign Octavia au Lune. Recently returned from exile
- Atlas au Raa a.k.a. the "Fear Knight" (Gold): brother to Romulus, Legate of the Zero Legion ("the Gorgons")
- Ajax au Grimus a.k.a. the "Storm Knight" (Gold): son of Aja au Grimmus and Atlas au Raa, heir of House Grimmus, leader of the Iron Leopards
- Kalindora au San a.k.a. the "Love Knight" (Gold): aunt to Alexander au Arcos, childhood friend of Atalantia au Grimmus and Anastasia au Lune
- Julia au Bellona (Gold): Cassius's estranged mother who harbors a fervent hatred of Darrow for killing her son, Julian. Primus of House Bellona
- Scorpio au Votum (Gold): Primus of House Votum, former ArchGovernor of Mercury
- Cicero au Votum (Gold): son of Scorpio and heir of House Votum, Legate of the Scorpion Legion
- Asmodeus au Carthii (Gold): Primus of House Carthii, the shipbuilders of Venus
- Scipio au Falthe (Gold): Primus of House Falthe
- Rhone ti Flavinius (Gray): Lunese subPraetor, former second officer of XIII Dracones Praetorian Guard under Aja au Grimmus
- Seneca au Cern (Gold): Dux of Ajax, Centurion of the Iron Leopards
- Magnus au Grimmus, a.k.a. the "Ash Lord" (Gold): Former ArchImperator under Octavia, the Burner of Rhea, killed by the Howlers and Apollonius au Valii-Rath on Venus
- Octavia au Lune (Gold): Former Sovereign of the Society, grandmother to Lysander, killed by Darrow ten years previously.
- Aja au Grimmus (Gold): Former Protean Knight under Octavia, daughter of the Ash Lord, killed by Sevro ten years previously.
- Moira au Grimmus (Gold): Former Politico under Octavia, daughter of the Ash Lord, killed by Darrow ten years previously.

The Rim Dominion

- Dido au Raa (Gold): Co-consul of the Rim Dominion, wife of former Sovereign of the Rim Dominion, Romulus au Raa, a native Venusian of House Saud.
- Diomedes au Raa, a.k.a. the "Storm Knight" (Gold): eldest remaining son of Romulus and Dido, a blademaster and Taxiarchos of the Lightning Phalanx
- Seraphina au Raa (Gold): the remaining daughter of Romulus and Dido, a blademaster and Lochagos of the Eleventh Dust Walkers
- Marius au Raa (Gold): Quaestor, and son of Romulus and Dido
- Helios au Lux a.k.a. the "Truth Knight" (Gold): Co-consul of the Rim Dominion with Dido
- Romulus au Raa a.k.a. "The Lord of the Dust" (Gold): former Sovereign of the Rim Dominion and Primus of House Raa, killed by ceremonial suicide

The Obsidian

- Sefi the Quiet (Obsidian): Queen of the Obsidians and sister to fallen hero Ragnar Volarus, leader of the Valkyrie
- Valdir the Unshorn (Obsidian): Warlord and royal concubine of Sefi
- Ozgard (Obsidian): Shaman of the Firebones, advisor to Sefi
- Freihild (Obsidian): Skuggi spirit warrior, lover of Valdir
- Gudkind (Obsidian): Skuggi spirit warrior
- Xenophon (White): a logos, advisor to Sefi
- Ragnar Volarus aka "The Shield of Tinos" (Obsidian): Former leader of the Obsidian tribes on Mars, brother to Sefi, a Howler, killed by Aja au Grimmus ten years previously

Other Characters

- Ephraim ti Horn (Gray): Freelancer, former son of Ares, husband of Trigg ti Nakamura.
- Volga Fjorgan (Obsidian): Freelancer, Ephraim's associate and bodyguard.
- Apollonius au Valii-Rath, a.k.a. "The Minotaur" (Gold): heir of House Valii-Rath, verbose
- The Duke of Hands (Pink): Syndicate operative, master thief, a former Rose
- Lyria of Lagalos (Red): a Gamma Martian Red, former client of House Telemanus
- Liam of Lagalos (Red): nephew of Lyria, client of House Telemanus
- Harmony (Red): Leader of the terrorist group "the Red Hand", former Sons of Ares lieutenant. Responsible for the deaths of Lyria's family on Mars.
- Pytha (Blue): pilot and companion of Cassius and Lysander
- Figment (Brown): a mysterious Freelancer
- Mickey (Violet): the Rising carver who remade Darrow into a Gold.
- Fitchner au Barca a.k.a. the "Rage Knight" and "Ares" (Gold): former leader of the Sons of Ares, father of Sevro, killed by Cassius au Bellona
- Cassius au Bellona (Gold): Darrow's former friend and Morning Knight under the previous Sovereign, Octavia au Lune, caretaker and mentor of Lysander. Supposedly killed by Seraphina in a ritual duel on Io.

== Publication ==
The book was originally announced as a sequel trilogy to Red Rising in February 2016. The title of the second installment, Dark Age, was announced in February 2018 soon after the release of Iron Gold. Dark Age was released on July 30, 2019, and debuted at #4 on The New York Times Best Seller list.
