= Sons of Ares =

Sons of Ares could refer to:

- Red Rising: Sons of Ares, a comic book series that serve as the prequel to the Red Rising science fiction novel trilogy by Pierce Brown
- Sons of Ares, a fictional religious sect featured in the "Escape Velocity" episode of Battlestar Galactica
