= Morning Star (Brown novel) =

2016 science fiction novel by Pierce Brown

- First edition cover
- Author: Pierce Brown
- Audio read by: Tim Gerard Reynolds
- Language: English
- Series: Red Rising
- Release number: 3
- Genre: Science fiction
- Publisher: Del Rey Books (US)
- Publication date: February 9, 2016
- Publication place: United States
- Media type: Print (hardcover); E-book; Audiobook
- Pages: 518
- ISBN: 0-345-53984-2
- Preceded by: Golden Son
- Followed by: Iron Gold

Morning Star is a 2016 science fiction novel by American author Pierce Brown; it is the third in his Red Rising trilogy. Morning Star picks up as the lowborn Darrow escapes capture and resumes his campaign against the tyrannical Sovereign of the Society. Pragmatic as ever, he begins to amass the resources and allies he needs to defeat the forces of the Sovereign.

Preceded by Red Rising (2014) and Golden Son (2015), Morning Star was published on February 9, 2016, and debuted at #1 on The New York Times Best Seller list. Brown announced a sequel trilogy in February 2016, to begin with the novel Iron Gold in January 2018.

== Plot ==
Harmony's betrayal of Darrow to Adrius saw Io's ArchGovernor Revus au Raa murdered at Darrow's victory feast, prompting the Rim Golds' rebellion against the Society. In the year since the Lion's Rain, Roque's Sword Armada has defeated Virginia's fleet, then attacked Jupiter's moons. Howler Thistle has defected to the Jackal's Boneriders and Sevro has become Ares, leading the Rising's war against the Society. Darrow is imprisoned and tortured by Adrius, giving up his home mining colony of Lykos. A doppelgänger of Darrow is publicly executed and Sevro publicly reveals Darrow's Red origin, sparking system-wide riots and rebellion among the lowColors.

Adrius plans to hand Darrow to Octavia's Praetorians for dissection, but two of them, siblings Holiday and Trigg, rescue Darrow on behalf of the Sons of Ares. Upon discovering Victra is alive and also in captivity, they extract her. Darrow subdues and kills a mocking Vixus, but Aja au Grimmus kills Trigg before Sevro and Ragnar rescue the group. After recuperating, Darrow, Victra, and Holiday join the Howlers, with Sevro continuing to lead the Rising, despite Darrow's increasing disillusion with his guerrilla tactics.

While attempting to kidnap Adrius's financial ally Quicksilver on Phobos, the Howlers ignite a skirmish during Quicksilver's peace negotiation between the Society and Virginia's forces. Cassius escapes, Virginia flees after identifying Darrow, and the Howlers kidnap Quicksilver, Matteo, and Kavax. Quicksilver reveals that he co-founded the Sons of Ares, resenting Gold for stifling scientific and economic progress. Sevro and Darrow fight and reconcile, with Sevro ceding leadership to Darrow. Ragnar frees Kavax and Virginia then finds and joins Darrow to determine if he is someone who can rebuild from the ashes of Society.

The Rising seizes Phobos as a diversion, allowing Darrow, Ragnar, Holiday, and Virginia to visit the southern pole of Mars to recruit Obsidians. Cassius and Aja follow. Virginia incapacitates Cassius, but Aja fatally wounds Ragnar and escapes. A dying Ragnar reunites with Sefi before Darrow euthanizes him. They find that Ragnar's mother Alia Snowsparrow is complicit with the Society Golds' deception of Obsidians. Darrow, Virginia, and Sefi invade Asgard, defeating the Society Golds, and Sefi executes Alia. Sefi leads the Obsidians in joining the Rising's fleet. Captured, Cassius reveals that Octavia's secret stockpile of planet-killing nuclear bombs was stolen, likely by Adrius.

Darrow sends the Rising's fleet to Jupiter to ally with the Rim Golds. Darrow meets the Rim's appointed Sovereign, Romulus au Raa, who invites both Roque and Darrow to negotiate. Darrow lies that Roque's fleet has Adrius' nuclear bombs and will decimate the Rim. When Roque admits the nuclear depot's existence, Romulus sides with Darrow in return for Rim independence and Darrow giving up the Rim's Sons of Ares.

The Rising and the Rim's fleets attack Roque's. Darrow sacrifices the Pax to storm Roque's flagship Colossus. Roque's Pink valet turns on him, allowing Darrow's party to board the bridge. Refusing capture, Roque takes his own life in front of Darrow.

Using Colossus, Darrow and Victra destroy Ganymede's shipyards to impede the Rim Golds' ability to fight the Rising, with Roque being blamed. Antonia's ships flee and the Sword Armada is shattered. Romulus realizes Darrow's lie but resentfully maintains it to avoid costly war against the Rising. Victra captures Antonia and Thistle. Antonia kills Thistle, leaving her the only one with knowledge of Adrius' plans and preventing Victra from killing her.

Adrius broadcasts himself executing Narol, prompting Sefi to lead a riot in the Rising's fleet against Gold prisoners. Sevro intervenes, stating that in war, they are all murderers, hanging himself alongside Cassius. Sefi cuts them down and Sevro forgives Cassius. In the aftermath, Victra and Sevro marry. Adrius admits to Darrow that he intentionally killed Quinn. Darrow reveals to Cassius that the Bellona family was massacred not by Darrow or the Rising, but by Adrius, with Octavia's knowledge.

The Rising's fleet attacks Luna, which Adrius anticipates, marshalling his own forces alongside Octavia's and the Ash Lord. Darrow releases Cassius, who vows to leave the war behind, but then turns on them seemingly killing Sevro and taking Darrow and Virginia prisoner. Cassius frees Antonia and they leave the Rising's fleet. Adrius brings them to Octavia, who has Aja execute Antonia for desertion.

Darrow lies about an Obsidian invasion, drawing guards away from the Sovereign's bunker. Over the HC, Octavia sentences Darrow to death before the entire system, but Cassius suddenly frees Darrow and Virginia. Darrow fatally stabs Octavia and wakes Sevro from a planned death-like stupor. Together Darrow, Virginia, Cassius, and Sevro kill Aja. As she dies, Octavia begs them to stop Adrius, who has placed the stolen nuclear bombs on Luna to blackmail Octavia into making him Sovereign. He has Lilath detonate several, killing millions. To stop him, Darrow tears out Adrius' tongue. Lysander persuades the Ash Lord to attack Lilath, and both he and the Rising destroy her ship, ending the nuclear threat.

Virginia becomes Sovereign, with Lysander, Darrow, Sevro, Cassius, and the Senate recognizing her ascent. The Rising captures Luna, Mars, and Earth, while the Ash Lord's fleet retreats to Mercury and Venus. Sefi's Obsidians return to Mars and Cassius adopts Lysander. Adrius is publicly executed. Virginia dissolves the Senate and charges thousands with crimes against humanity. She and Darrow begin work to reform the remnants of the Society. On Earth, Virginia reveals to Darrow that she secretly gave birth to their son, Pax.

== Characters ==
=== The Rising ===
The Rising is the revolutionary movement featured in the book, which seeks to reform or overthrow the ruling hierarchy to achieve fair treatment and justice for all human races. It comprises The Sons of Ares (the rebellious organization that originally started the movement), The Sun Industries (their financier), several Obsidian tribes and part of the fleet of the Lion House of Mars. Their characters include:

- Darrow au Andromedus of Lykos, a.k.a. "Reaper" and "Morning Star" (Gold/Red): a Red physically remade into a Gold to infiltrate and destroy the Society, he is the leader of "The Rising", the force rebelling against the Society. Darrow is a charismatic strategist and is not afraid of taking immense risks, but refuses to act like a terrorist and goes to a great lengths to prove he is not another destroyer.
- Virginia au Augustus, a.k.a. "Mustang" (Gold): daughter of Nero, the former ArchGovernor of Mars, and the estranged twin sister of the Jackal. When her former lover Darrow is betrayed, imprisoned and presumed dead, Mustang and her forces secede and join the separatists of the outer rim in what is called the Second Moon Rebellion. There, she and the Moon Lords fight the Sword Armada of the Sovereign. After her peace meeting with delegates of the Sovereign is interrupted, she joins The Rising but stipulates that Darrow must prove that he is not just another tyrant.
- Sevro au Barca, a.k.a. "Goblin" (Gold/Red): Darrow's best friend and second-in-command, he is the foulmouthed acting leader of the Sons of Ares. Unlike Darrow, while Sevro is in command of the Sons of Ares, he resorts to terrorist tactics like bombing. The Jackal takes advantage of this to broadcast anti-rebellion sentiments, even going to great lengths to commit acts of terror of his own for which the Sons of Ares are blamed. Under Sevro's leadership, the Sons lose their financial support and consistently fail to ally themselves with other rebelling factions. Sevro does not relinquish command to Darrow immediately when he arrives; Darrow has to wrest control by first beating Sevro and then reminding him how they became friends.
- Victra au Julii (Gold): Darrow's loyal lieutenant, and half sister of Antonia au Severus-Julii, she is imprisoned and tortured at the same time as Darrow. Unlike Darrow, however, her only motive for joining The Rising is revenge against her sister. As she and Sevro fell in love, however, revenge ceases to be her only motive.
- Ragnar Volarus, a.k.a. "Shield of Tinos" (Obsidian): Darrow's lieutenant, Ragnar has an unusually loud voice that other Obsidians don't. Having grown up among the superstitious and intellectually undeveloped Obsidians and recruited as a slave warrior into the Society, Ragnar has made several fruitless attempts to enlighten the other Obsidians. He is fatally wounded in a one-on-one battle with Aja au Grimmus but refuses to die in the traditional way of other unenlightened Obsidians (by refusing to hold his weapon). During his last moments, he urges Darrow to kill his mother, Alia Snowsparrow, who has deliberately kept other Obsidians in dark and will not be swayed by words.
- Sefi the Quiet (Obsidian): Ragnar's sister, the silence-oathbound daughter of Alia Snowsparrow, and the heir apparent to the throne of a tribe of Obsidians known as Valkyries. Upon discovering that the Gods she and her tribe worship are mortal Golds in disguise, she deposes her mother, becomes the queen of Valkyries and starts speaking again. She is instrumental in causing other Obsidian tribes to become allies of The Rising. Later, after the victory over the Sword Armada, all other Obsidian tribes recognize her as their first pan-tribal queen.
- Holiday ti Nakamura (Gray): a Gray Legionnaire secretly working for the Sons of Ares, and Darrow's deputy. Her brother Trigg is killed rescuing Darrow and Victra from imprisonment.
- Regulus ag Sun, a.k.a. "Quicksilver" (Silver): a Silver and the richest man in the Society through ownership of the helium-3 refineries on Phobos. As the co-founder of the Sons of Ares, Quicksilver stops funding Sevro and his terrorist activities but is nevertheless instrumental in building their secret hideout city, Tinos. Quicksilver believes that the Society has brought the mankind's evolution to a halt and has stifled the scientific progress to maintain dominance. In his view, what the downtrodden race of Reds do should be done by robots. For the second half of the book, he contributes to The Rising through cyberwarfare.
- "Dancer" (Red): Darrow's mentor in the Sons of Ares and later the Sons' liaison for the Reds.
- Narol (Red): Darrow's uncle. He is caught sabotaging the Jackal's satellites and is tortured and executed. His execution is broadcast to Darrow's fleet, triggering the Obsidian riot led by Sefi.

=== The Society ===
The Society is the tyrannical government that has ruled the whole solar system but lost control of all planets beyond the asteroid belt before the start of the book. It characters include:

- Adrius au Augustus, a.k.a. "Jackal" (Gold): Virginia's twin brother, the sociopathic ArchGovernor of Mars. Jackal is not afraid of genocide, having bombed one city from space during the events of the book. Before the events of the novel, the Jackal has stolen 400 nuclear warheads, each having a yield of 30 megatons. He has ordered these warheads to be planted on Luna, the capital of the Society, and plans to use them as leverage to become the Sovereign. When the Sovereign dies, the Jackal uses the same gambit against Darrow, but loses.
- Alia Snowsparrow (Obsidian): Queen of the Obsidian tribe Valkyries, she is famous for her devotion to her Gods and her religion. Unbeknownst to all, Alia knows that her Gods are a ruse, yet becomes part of the ruse to remain the ruler. When she refuses to abandon the charade, she is killed by her daughter, Sefi.
- Cassius au Bellona, the Morning Knight (Gold): Cassius and Darrow harbor deep hatred towards one another as Darrow has been instrumental in extermination of the Bellona family and Cassius has previously killed several of Darrow's friends. Cassius, however, hosts a damaged sense of honor and loyalty which has turned him into a confused character. He spends the large part of the book in captivity. However, he strikes an alliance with Darrow when he sees footage given to him by Darrow of his family being assassinated by the Jackal's forces.
- Octavia au Lune (Gold): the Sovereign of the Society. She became Sovereign by decapitating her own father (a tyrannical Sovereign) and presenting it to the senate. She ruled for sixty years and is a staunch believer that the color system brings about the prosperity of the mankind. Ironically, her first spoken words in the book convey that she cannot be bothered with civilian casualties.
- Roque au Fabii, a.k.a. "Poet of Deimos" (Gold): Imperator of the Sovereign's Sword Armada. Although Darrow calls him a former friend, in reality, he has been an enemy of Darrow far longer than Darrow realizes. Defeated in the battle of the outer rim, Roque kills himself.
- Antonia au Severus-Julii (Gold): Praetor of the Fifth and Sixth Legions and Victra's half-sister, she shot Victra in the spine and is the reason she spent a year enduring torture in the custody of the Jackal. During the battle of the outer rim, she deserts the rest of the fleet. As such, the Sovereign has her executed.
- Lysander au Lune (Gold): grandson and heir of the Sovereign.
- Magnus au Grimmus, a.k.a. "Ash Lord" (Gold): father of Aja and Moira, he is the supreme commander of the Sovereign's fleet. Near the end of the book, he battles the fleet of The Rising but is convinced to end the combat when nuclear bombs of the Jackal begin detonating on Luna. At the behest of Mustang, he directs the loyalists to fire on the Jackal's flagship.
- Aja au Grimmus, the Protean Knight (Gold): the Sovereign's bodyguard and the daughter of the Ash Lord, Aja is the most dangerous swordsman in the book. Her mentor has likened fighting Aja to fighting a river. Aja puts up a fierce battle before dying and is only overcome by the combined forces of four Golds.
- Lilath au Faran (Gold): Companion of the Jackal and the leader of his Boneriders division, she is placed on the Jackal's flagship to detonate nukes on Luna. She is assumed dead when the Jackal's flag ship is fired upon from all sides by both the loyalists and the Rising.

=== Others ===
- Romulus au Raa (Gold): ArchGovernor of Io, he secedes from the Society in the Second Moon Rebellion.
- Dio (Red): sister of Darrow's late wife, Eo.

In March 2016, Brown named Victra is his favorite character to write, saying that she "is dark and broken...but she finds her way back". He added, "And the Jackal because he's that little dark part of me that is lonely, the jealous part. He just always wants what he can't have." Brown said of Mustang's final mercy towards her brother, the Jackal, that "Some readers have been very vocal that they didn't think that he deserved any mercy, but I always felt he was as much a victim of his own life, and even if redemption was not possible, someone showed him love at the very end." Brown also noted that he almost killed off Cassius, saying "Cassius' taking care of Lysander also gave me a reason to save him. Darrow would have killed him otherwise. Ultimately, he didn't kill him because he felt guilty. Which plays into the next series ..."

== Publication ==
Morning Star is the third and final novel in Brown's Red Rising trilogy, preceded by Red Rising (2014) and Golden Son (2015). In August 2015, Brown said of the novel:

I'm working on the second draft [of Morning Star] as we speak. It's a more ambitious book than either Red Rising or Golden Son, so I've got my work cut out for me, but I couldn't be more pleased with how things are going so far. It's my last baby in the Red Rising Trilogy, so I want to make it the best.

It was published on February 9, 2016, and debuted at #1 on The New York Times Best Seller list. It reached #1 on USA Today's Best-Selling Books list, and won the Goodreads Choice Award for science fiction.

Brown announced a sequel trilogy in February 2016, to begin with the novel Iron Gold, published in January 2018.

== Reception ==
Kirkus Reviews called Morning Star an "ambitious and satisfying conclusion to a monumental saga", noting that "Brown creates an alternative universe that is multilayered and seething with characters who exist in a shadow world between history and myth, much as in Frank Herbert's Dune." Marc Snetiker of Entertainment Weekly referred to Brown as "science fiction's best-kept secret", calling the novel "devastating and inspiring" and writing that "the violence here is grimmer, its humor more unsettling, its forgiveness rarer, its casualties more sickening." Publishers Weekly called the Morning Star "excellent", adding that "Brown's vivid, first-person prose puts the reader right at the forefront of impassioned speeches, broken families, and engaging battle scenes that don't shy away from the gore as this intrastellar civil war comes to a most satisfying conclusion." Kristine Huntley of Booklist described the novel as "simply stellar", calling it "a page-turning epic filled with twists and turns, heartbreaks and daring gambles" and praising Brown's "fabulously imagined universe". Comparing the series to Star Wars and calling Morning Star "this trilogy's Return of the Jedi", Niall Alexander wrote in Tor.com that "as an ending, it absolutely satisfies" while noting some flaws in pacing, character development and accessibility for new readers. Jason Sheehan of NPR praised Brown's vivid action scenes but wrote that this third installment is heavy on exposition.
