= Iron Gold =

2018 novel by Pierce Brown

- First edition cover
- Author: Pierce Brown
- Audio read by: Tim Gerard Reynolds; Aedin Moloney; John Curless; Julian Elfer
- Language: English
- Series: Iron Gold
- Release number: 1
- Genre: Science fiction
- Publisher: Del Rey Books (US)
- Publication date: January 16, 2018
- Publication place: United States
- Media type: Print (hardcover); E-book; Audiobook
- Pages: 596
- ISBN: 978-0-425-28591-6
- Preceded by: Morning Star
- Followed by: Dark Age

Iron Gold is a 2018 science fiction novel by American author Pierce Brown; it is the first of a tetralogy which continues the story of his Red Rising trilogy (2014–2016). Iron Gold takes place ten years after the events of Morning Star (2016), with Darrow "The Reaper" of Lykos and Virginia "Mustang" au Augustus leading the new Solar Republic. It is followed by Dark Age (2019).

== Plot summary ==
Ten years after the events of Morning Star, the Republic's war against the Society continues. Virginia and Romulus au Raa are the respective Sovereigns of the Republic and Rim Dominion. Darrow leads the Republic's military as ArchImperator. Dancer becomes the opposition leader of the Republic's multi-Colour Senate. The Ash Lord, Magnus au Grimmus, leads the Society from Venus.

Darrow disobeys the Senate by assaulting Mercury with an Iron Rain, liberating the planet from the Society. When Darrow returns to Luna, Dancer reveals to the Republic Senate that Darrow secretly rejected Magnus' proposal of a ceasefire. The Senate turns against Darrow, who conspires with the Howlers to escape and assassinate Magnus. Before Darrow and Sevro leave Luna, they bid farewell to their children. There, Virginia attempts to have the Republic Wardens arrest Darrow, but they escape, with Darrow accidentally killing ArchWarden Wulfgar. Darrow navigates to Earth, where they liberate Apollonius au Valii-Rath from a maximum security prison intending to use his knowledge of the Society in exile to access the Ash Lord. They implant a bomb in Apollonius' head to ensure his cooperation.

Living as a vigilantes in the Asteroid Belt, Lysander and his mentor Cassius rescue Seraphina au Raa from an Ascomanni attack on her ship. Pursued by the Ascomanni, Lysander follows Seraphina's coordinates, where her father Romulus' forces rescue them and they are taken to Io. Romulus orders Seraphina's imprisonment and Cassius and Lysander's execution. However, Romulus' wife Dido enacts a coup against her husband, stopping the executions, extracting Seraphina and imprisoning Romulus. Unbeknownst to Cassius and Lysander, Seraphina is aware of Cassius' identity and confides in Dido. At her mother's command, Seraphina retrieved footage of Darrow and Victra's destruction of Ganymede's dockyards, and hid the evidence inside Cassius' safe. When Dido demands he open the safe, he refuses, hoping to prevent the Rim from declaring war on the Republic.

To manipulate Lysander into opening the safe, Dido swears vengeance on Cassius for the deaths of her daughter and father-in-law in the Reaper's Triumph. Though Cassius defeats many members of House Raa in duels, he is eventually defeated by Seraphina. Lysander reveals his own identity and opens the safe to save Cassius. Dido reveals the footage to the Moon Lords; Diomedes informs Lysander that Cassius has died from his wounds.

Romulus' mother, Gaia, frees Lysander, intending them to free Romulus and end Dido's coup and intended war. However, in a gamble and out of a desire to end to the violence of the Rising, Lysander betrays Gaia to Dido. Intending to co-rule with Romulus, Dido orchestrates a trial for his failure to investigate the attack on Ganymede's shipyards, accusing him of negligence, but not treason. To Dido's horror, the Whites and Olympic Knights of Io charge Romulus with treason, and he admits knowledge of the footage but concealed it to prevent war with the Republic. As the Rim worlds prepare for war, Romulus commits ceremonial suicide, urging Lysander to stop the war before it consumes the entire system. Lysander proposes to negotiate an alliance between the Rim and the Society remnants against the Republic; Dido accepts.

Under Harmony, the terrorist faction, the Red Hand, attacks Mars' Gammas, killing most of the family of 18-year-old Lyria of Lagolos. Kavax au Telemanus leads the Republic defense, in which Lyria saves him from drowning. As thanks, he employs her as a valet. Freelancer thief Ephraim ti Horn and his team are contracted under duress by the Syndicate to kidnap Darrow's son, Pax, and Sevro's daughter, Electra. To do so, Ephraim befriends Lyria and secretly plants on her a device that disables Kavax's ship, allowing him to abduct the children. Kavax is gravely wounded and when Ephraim tries to kill Lyria, he finds he cannot and abducts her. Ephraim and his associate Volga bring the children to the Syndicate's Duke of Hands. Lyria escapes from the Duke and surrenders to the Republic. While Niobe au Telemanus prevents Victra from capturing Lyria, she and Theodora begin to torture her for the children's location. Virginia stops this and Lyria helps identify Ephraim. Virginia has Volga incarcerated to coerce Ephraim in to helping find the children. Ephraim is able to take the Duke hostage, freeing Pax and Electra, but in their escape, the Syndicate's Queen takes control of their ship, forcing Ephraim to crash it. In retaliation for her role in the kidnapping, Victra has Lyria abducted.

The Howlers infiltrate Venus; Apollonius retakes House Valii-Rath and its meager remaining forces from Tharsus and they attack the Ash Lord's island stronghold. Several Howlers are killed, notably Clown, but Apollonius saves Darrow. They find Magnus withered and bedridden. Apollonius reveals he had Magnus poisoned three years prior, and his daughter Atalantia has assumed quiet leadership of his forces. Magnus reveals her imminent attack on Mercury, and Pax and Electra's kidnapping, implying one of Darrow's inner circle was responsible for the abduction. Darrow, Sevro, and Apollonius incinerate Magnus. Darrow deactivates Apollonius' bomb and leaves him to attempt to wrest control of Venus from House Carthii. When Darrow reveals his intent to sail for Mercury and try and stop Atalantia's massacre rather than make for Luna and rescue their children, Sevro abandons him. The Howlers split up and Darrow reluctantly chooses the war over his family.

== Characters ==
- Darrow of Lykos, a.k.a. the "Reaper" and the "Morning Star": a Red physically remade into a Gold to infiltrate and destroy the Society. The former leader of the revolution known as "The Rising", Darrow is the ArchImperator of the new Solar Republic.
- Virginia au Augustus, a.k.a. "Mustang" (Gold): daughter of the former ArchGovernor of Mars, Darrow's wife, and mother of their son Pax. She serves the new Solar Republic as its elected Sovereign.
- Sevro au Barca, a.k.a. "Goblin" and "Ares" (Gold/Red): Darrow's best friend and second-in-command. His father was Gold and his mother was Red.
- Victra au Barca (Gold): Darrow's former lieutenant, Sevro's wife, and a wealthy shipping magnate in the Solar Republic.
- Cassius au Bellona (Gold): Darrow's former friend and Morning Knight under the previous Sovereign, Octavia au Lune. Although he and Darrow have reconciled for the sake of peace, Cassius remains an independent freedom fighter far removed from the Republic worlds.
- Lysander au Lune (Gold): grandson and heir to Octavia au Lune. Cassius has raised and protected him since the rise of the Republic.
- Kavax au Telemanus (Gold): longtime ally to Virginia and Darrow, father of Daxo, Thraxa, and the deceased Pax au Telemanus.
- Niobe au Telemanus (Gold): Kavax's wife.
- Daxo au Telemanus (Gold): son and heir to Kavax, a Gold Senator in the Solar Republic and ally of Virginia.
- Thraxa au Telemanus (Gold): daughter of Kavax and Niobe, one of Darrow's trusted Howlers.
- Magnus au Grimmus, a.k.a. the "Ash Lord" (Gold): A former ArchImperator and supreme commander of the Sovereign's fleet, he and his allies rule the remains of the Society from Venus.
- Atalantia au Grimmus (Gold): the Ash Lord's sole remaining daughter, sister to Aja and Moira au Grimmus.
- Julia au Bellona (Gold): Cassius's mother who harbors a fervent hatred of Darrow for killing her son, Julian. A supporter of the Ash Lord.
- Romulus au Raa (Gold): Sovereign of the Rim Dominion, home of a collection of Gold families who seceded from the Society during the events of Morning Star and rules similarly to the Society.
- Dido au Raa (Gold): Romulus's wife, a native Venusian of House Saud.
- Seraphina au Raa (Gold): the remaining daughter of Romulus and Dido, a Peerless Scarred and blademaster.
- Diomedes au Raa, a.k.a. the "Storm Knight" (Gold): eldest remaining son of Romulus and Dido, a blademaster.
- Marius au Raa (Gold): Quaestor, and son of Romulus and Dido.
- Alexandar au Arcos (Gold), Howler, lancer to Darrow, and grandson of Lorn au Arcos, the former Rage Knight and Darrow's mentor.
- Pax (Gold): son of Darrow and Virginia, one of the first freeColors.
- Electra au Barca (Gold): eldest daughter of Sevro and Victra.
- Apollonius au Valii-Rath, a.k.a "The Mad Minotaur" (Gold): eldest of House Valii-Rath; imprisoned in Deepgrave for crimes against the Republic.
- Regulus ag Sun, a.k.a. "Quicksilver" (Silver): the richest man in the known worlds and co-founder of the Sons of Ares. He has almost singlehandedly rebuilt Luna following the fall of the Society.
- Sefi (Obsidian): Queen of the Obsidians and sister to fallen hero Ragnar. A longtime ally of Darrow's, but is coming to realize his war's toll on her people.
- Wulfgar the Whitetooth (Obsidian): a hero of the Rising, now ArchWarden of the Republic.
- Holiday ti Nakamura (Gray): Legionnaire and Howler, formerly a mole for the Sons of Ares; sister of Trigg.
- Ephraim ti Horn (Gray): former son of Ares whose fiancé, Trigg, was killed rescuing Darrow and Victra from the Jackal. Ephraim works as a freelance thief.
- Volga Fjorgan (Obsidian): Ephraim's associate and bodyguard.
- Dano (Red): cat burglar, one of Ephraim's associates.
- "Dancer O"Faran" (Red): Darrow's former mentor in the Sons of Ares, now a powerful senator in the Republic and leader of the Vox Populi, a socialist faction operating against Virginia.
- Rhonna (Red): daughter of Darrow's brother Kieran and one of his lancers.
- Lyria of Lagalos (Red): a Gamma Red marooned by the Rising in a Mars' relocation camp after she is freed from the mines. She harbors a resentment toward the Republic for their failure to improve the lives of the Reds they freed.
- Cyra si Lamensis (Green): locksmith, one of Ephraim's associates.
- Pytha (Blue): pilot and companion of Cassius and Lysander.
- Mickey (Violet): the Rising carver who remade Darrow.

== Development and themes ==
Brown announced a sequel trilogy to Red Rising in February 2016. He later noted, "I didn't think I would write more but I started seeing so many plots, particularly with the Ash Lord and the chaos that happens when an empire falls." Brown said of his inspiration to write the sequel trilogy:

To be honest, I was curious. Not just about what happens to an empire once it has been broken, but what rises from the ashes. What happens to rebels once they take on the mantle of rule. Authority is a pressure cooker of responsibility that twists and hardens. Darrow and Mustang will learn it was easier to throw proverbial Molotov cocktails than it is to govern ten billion souls.

Brown said that while the first trilogy followed Darrow's quest, the new series explores the consequences of Darrow's rebellion, asking, "Have they unleashed dark ages or a renaissance? I think you can pretty much bet it'll be dark ages for a little while." He cited the primary theme as "What is better, rule and order or chaos and freedom?", and later explained, "What this new book is about ... is seeing the people that are affected negatively by the positive actions of Darrow, and seeing the negative repercussions of them." Before publication, Brown noted that both Darrow and Mustang would be "integral characters" in the novel, which would be told from four viewpoints: Darrow, another familiar character, and two new ones. Though Brown considered several characters, including Mustang and Sevro, he wanted a more even representation of colors, and chose Darrow, the Red-turned-Gold protagonist of the first trilogy; Lysander, a Gold disenfranchised by the events of the previous novels; and two new characters with a grudge against Darrow and the Rebellion: Lyria, a Red freed from slavery in the mines, and Ephraim, a Gray whose husband was killed rescuing Darrow. Brown said, "I want to expand the universe and also see how others perceive Darrow." Besides introducing new characters, the new trilogy will explore planets and elements only briefly touched on in the previous series. Brown called the scope of the new trilogy "huge" and "far more ambitious than Red Rising", noting: "It spans the solar system, weaves in disparate cultures and moons and planets—most of which had to be created from scratch. It has been an exercise not only in world-building but in understanding how the world would affect these diverse characters." Comparing the new trilogy to the previous, Brown said, "It has the firefights and midnight duels and blood feuds, but many of the characters are not wrecking balls like Darrow. They must use other means to achieve their goals." He explained that the novel's title "refers to the original Gold conquerors; the founders of Society who were infinitely tougher, smarter, and more brutal than their descendants would become after 700 years of rule. It is an ideal that many of the former ruling class wish to bring back in their fight against the Rising."

Brown also noted, "Several of the main characters in the next one will be gay. Darrow's heteronormative outlook has been changing after leaving the mines. He began embracing sexual fluidity and gay characters like Tactus." He discussed the popularity of his novels among the LGBT community, adding, "It's amazing that they have found a home in these books ... All these lost souls in my books have connected with people and I find it incredibly moving."

== Publication ==
Iron Gold was released on January 16, 2018, and debuted at #3 on The New York Times Best Seller list. It is the first novel of a planned tetralogy.
