= Télé Poche =

- Editor: Eric Pavon
- Categories: Television magazine
- Frequency: Weekly
- Total circulation: 432,100 (2014)
- First issue: 12 January 1966; 60 years ago
- Company: Mondadori France
- Country: France
- Language: French
- Website: Télé Poche
- ISSN: 1274-9192

Télé Poche (literally "Pocket TV") is a weekly television listings magazine published in France.

== History and profile ==
Created by Franco-Italian editor Cino Del Duca, Télé Poche was launched on 12 January 1966 by Cora-Révillon's Mondiales subsidiary. The magazine is published on a weekly basis. Eric Pavon is the editor of Télé Poche.

The magazine takes its name from its original digest size format (13.8 x 20.9 cm, 5.4 x 8.2 inches), half the size of traditional magazines. Mondiales, the owner of the magazine, was purchased by the British group Emap in 1994, and the new owner increased its page size by 27%, to 17.5 x 26.5 cm (6.9 x 10.4 inches) in 2005. Its current owner, Italian publisher Arnoldo Mondadori Editore (a subsidiary of Fininvest), acquired Télé Poche in 2006.

== Circulation ==
In 1974 Télé Poche sold 1,500,000 copies. The 1989 circulation of the weekly was 1,73 million copies. Ten years later its circulation was 1,666,000 copies in 1999.

The circulation of Télé Poche was 733,898 copies in 2005. Its circulation was 645,000 copies in 2007. It was 580,628 copies in 2010. The weekly had a circulation of 487,466 copies in 2012. Its circulation was 432,100 copies in 2014.
