= Golden Son =

2015 novel by Pierce Brown

- First edition cover
- Author: Pierce Brown
- Audio read by: Tim Gerard Reynolds
- Language: English
- Series: Red Rising
- Release number: 2
- Genre: Science fiction
- Publisher: Del Rey Books (US)
- Publication date: January 6, 2015
- Publication place: United States
- Media type: Print (hardcover); E-book; Audiobook
- Pages: 464
- ISBN: 0-345-53981-8
- Preceded by: Red Rising
- Followed by: Morning Star

Golden Son is a 2015 science fiction novel by American author Pierce Brown; it is the second in his Red Rising trilogy.

The sequel to 2014's Red Rising, Golden Son continues to follow lowborn Darrow's plan to destroy the Society from within. It debuted at #6 on The New York Times Best Seller list and won the 2015 Goodreads Choice Award for Science Fiction.

Golden Son is followed by the third novel in the series, Morning Star, published in February 2016.

== Plot summary ==
Darrow, Roque, Tactus, Victra, and Leto are House Augustus lancers. Lorn secretly trains Darrow in swordsmanship. Cassius and Fitchner are Olympic Knights. Virginia infiltrates Sovereign Octavia's court and seduces Cassius. Adrius enters the communications business, and the Augustus Politico, Pliny, schemes against Darrow and Adrius, favouring Leto.

Two years after winning the Institute, 20-year-old Darrow finishes second in the fleet-commanding Academy, losing to Karnus due to Octavia and the Proctors' interference. House Bellona's victory makes Nero prepare to disown Darrow, who House Bellona wants dead for killing Julian. Victra delivers Darrow to Adrius on Luna, who proposes protection and an alliance, which Darrow accepts.

Sons of Ares member Evey, a slave Darrow freed from Mickey, attempts to kill Adrius. Darrow saves Adrius. Darrow meets Sons member Harmony, who enslaved Mickey. She says Dancer was killed and reveals that Darrow's wife Eo was pregnant when hanged. Crushed, Darrow agrees to bomb the ruling Gold families' Summit. Roque says he will purchase Darrow to protect him, but Darrow drugs Roque to save him from the bomb.

At the Summit, Darrow abandons the bombing plan after seeing Virginia accompanying Cassius. To spark a Gold civil war, Darrow challenges, duels, and defeats Cassius. Octavia tells Darrow to stop, contrary to the dueling law. Virginia stops Darrow from executing Cassius, House Bellona attacks, and a mass swordfight erupts as grudges are settled. Virginia saves Darrow and Karnus kills Leto with Adrius's assistance. Fitchner stuns Nero and Adrius. Darrow meets Octavia, who questions if Nero is Ares. Octavia's plan for killing Nero and his entourage at the Summit is exposed, shocking Virginia.

Sevro, the Howlers, and Quinn free Darrow at Virginia's arrangement. Virginia and Sevro kidnap Octavia's grandson, Lysander. Aja grievously wounds Quinn and Adrius announces her death, devastating Roque and Sevro. Tactus defects, returning Lysander. Darrow and Sevro storm the enemy flagship Vanguard, capturing it after Darrow enlists the Vanguard’s other Colors to defeat enemy Golds and appoints the Blue Orion as ship captain. Stained Obsidian Ragnar rebels and pledges himself to Darrow. House Augustus escapes Luna. Sevro confronts Darrow, who admits to being a Red. Sevro reveals Ares and (still alive) Dancer sent him to help Darrow. Ares says Harmony betrayed them.

The Society’s forces capture Mars. Darrow visits Europa to forcefully recruit Lorn. Anticipating an ambush, Darrow defeats the forces of Aja and House Bellona. Tactus takes Lorn's grandchildren hostage, surrendering when Darrow forgives him. Lorn executes Tactus and reluctantly allies with Darrow. Darrow lets Aja escape, tracking her rejoining Octavia on Mars, which alienates Roque. Darrow emancipates Ragnar.

Pliny betrays Nero and Adrius to Octavia, who has Fitchner and Cassius capture them when they attack Ganymede. Darrow's forces storm Pliny's ship, freeing Adrius. Darrow humiliates Pliny. The Golds who served Pliny kill him.

Darrow's forces invade Bellona-controlled Mars with an Iron Rain broadcast by the Sons, Adrius, and House Augustus. Victra persuades her mother, Agrippina, to defect, allying with Nero. After Howler Harpy is killed, Darrow stops Sevro from killing a Brown girl, who detonates an EMP, sinking Darrow's armored Howlers in a river, killing Weed and Rotback. Darrow and Ragnar save the others. Darrow gives Ragnar a razor and a leadership position, shocking Thistle.

Darrow storms Octavia's ship alone, killing Karnus. Aja defeats Darrow. Fitchner rescues Darrow, revealing to Darrow his identity: Ares. Octavia's ship escapes and Adrius liberates Nero. Darrow's forces prevail and many Bellona, including Imperator Tiberius, are killed. Roque wins in space.

Post-battle, Darrow sleeps with Virginia. Darrow, Sevro, and the Sons free Harmony, Evey, and Mickey from Adrius's capture. Fitchner reveals his wife, Bryn, was a Red, killed for birthing a half-Gold, Sevro.

Darrow brings Virginia to Lykos and admits to being Eo's Red husband. Darrow reunites with his mother. Virginia realizes Darrow's intended revolution will kill millions. Darrow and Ragnar tell her to kill them if she opposes. Virginia leaves. Nero decides Darrow will marry Virginia.

Roque betrays and sedates Darrow at a victory feast, mocking him for being Red. Adrius and Lilath kill Lorn. Antonia incapacitates Victra and kills Agrippina. Nero is captured and Adrius admits to paying Karnus to kill Nero's favorite child, Claudius. Nero disowns Adrius, who executes Nero despite Aja's protests. Seeing Fitchner's severed head, Darrow despairs.

== Characters ==
- Darrow, a Red remade into a Gold named "Darrow au Andromedus" to infiltrate and destroy the Society. Nicknamed "The Reaper" at the institute, he is a lancer of House Augustus.
- Virginia au Augustus, nicknamed "Mustang", daughter of Nero au Augustus and twin sister of Adrius.
- Adrius au Augustus, Virginia's sociopathic twin brother, called "The Jackal".
- Nero au Augustus, the ArchGovernor of Mars and father of Virginia and Adrius.
- Victra au Julii, lancer of House Augustus, half sister to Antonia au Severus.
- Roque au Fabii, lancer of House Augustus.
- Tactus au Rath, lancer of House Augustus.
- Kavax au Telemanus, father of Daxo and the late Pax.
- Daxo au Telemanus, son of Kavax and Pax's brother.
- Cassius au Bellona, lancer of House Bellona, brother of Julian and Karnus.
- Karnus au Bellona, lancer of House Bellona, brother of Cassius and Julian.
- Octavia au Lune, the Sovereign of the Society.
- Lysander au Lune, grandson and heir of the Sovereign and grandson of Lorn au Arcos.
- Aja au Grimmus, the Sovereign's Protean Knight.
- Lorn au Arcos, the former Rage Knight.
- Fitchner au Barca, former Proctor of Mars at the institute, father of Sevro.
- Sevro au Barca, leader of the Howlers, son of Fitchner.
- Antonia au Severus-Julii, Darrow's ruthless longtime enemy and Victra's half sister.
- Pliny au Velocitor, Nero's chief of staff.
- Dancer, Red lieutenant in the Sons of Ares.
- Harmony, Dancer's Red lieutenant.
- Mickey, a Violet carver who remade Darrow as a Gold.
- Evey, a Pink former slave of Mickey.

== Reception ==
Golden Son debuted at #6 on The New York Times Best Seller list, and won the 2015 Goodreads Choice Award for Science Fiction. Marc Snetiker of Entertainment Weekly gave the novel an A, calling it "gripping" and noting that "Darrow au Andromedus will break your heart." He added:

With Golden Son, Brown avoids the sophomore slump, charging the novel with the kind of dystopia-toppling action you'd expect in a trilogy ender, not a middle volume. On virtually every level, this is a sequel that hates sequels—a perfect fit for a hero who already defies the tropes ... This isn't a retread of the first book's winning formula; Brown opts to surprise instead of satisfy, which is why certain delicious curveballs will blast readers out of orbit.

Publishers Weekly called the novel "twisty" and noted that hero Darrow "is forced to manipulate both friend and foe, a burden described vividly and to great effect ... Dramatic battles with a real sense of loss, and a final chapter that slams into both Darrow and the reader, make this the rare middle book that loses almost no momentum as it sets up the final installment."
