= Pierce Brown =

American science fiction author (born 1988)

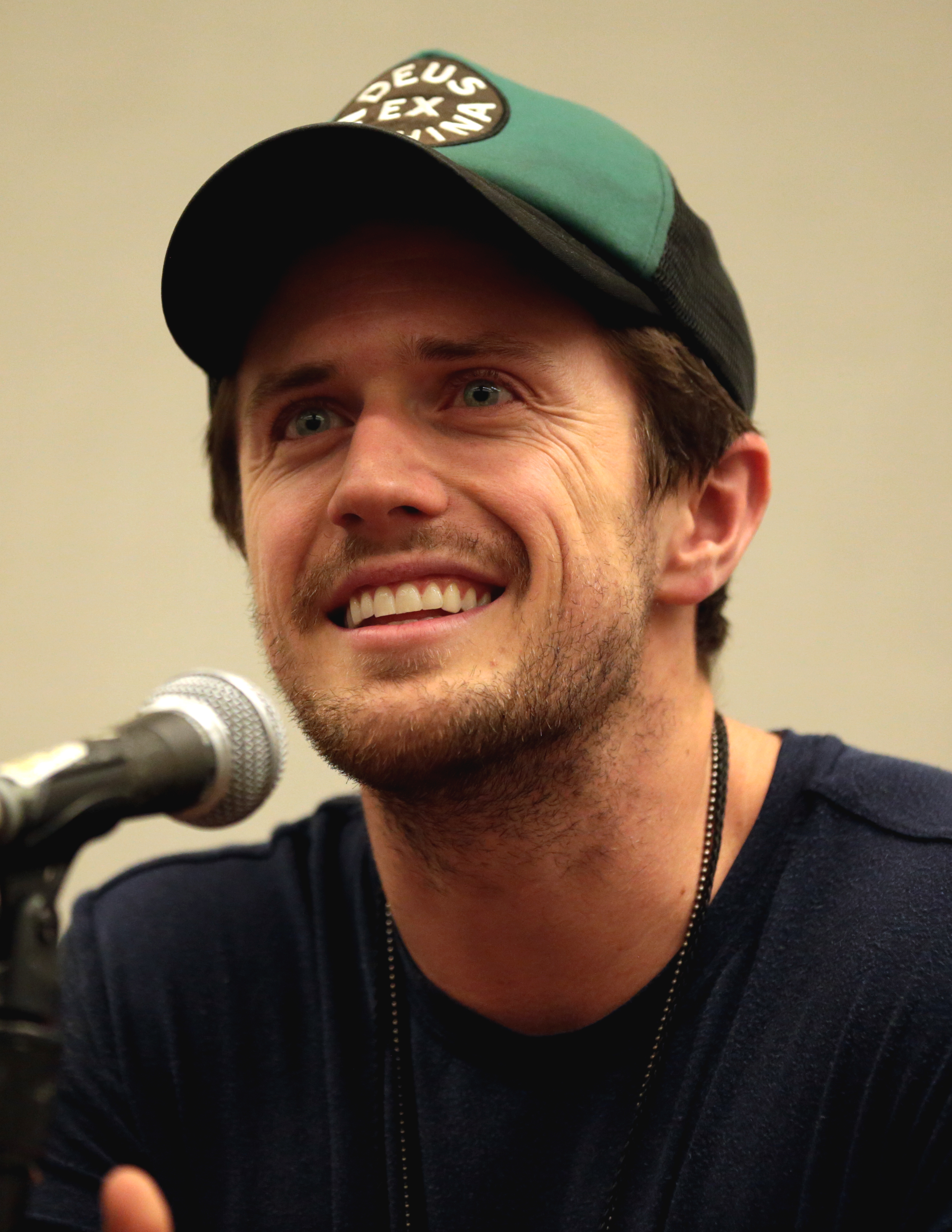
- Brown at the 2017 Phoenix Comicon
- Born: January 28, 1988 (age 38); Denver, Colorado, US
- Education: Pepperdine University (BA)
- Occupations: Novelist and screenwriter
- Writing career
- Language: English
- Subjects: Science fiction, young adult, dystopian
- Notable work: Red Rising saga
- Notable awards: Goodreads Best Science Fiction Novel 2015 & 2016, Goodreads Best New Author 2014
- Website: piercebrown.com

Pierce Brown (born January 28, 1988) is an American science fiction author who writes the Red Rising series, consisting of Red Rising (2014), Golden Son (2015), Morning Star (2016), Iron Gold (2018), Dark Age (2019), and Light Bringer (2023). He also wrote a six-issue prequel comic book series, Red Rising: Sons of Ares, published in 2015.

== Biography ==
Pierce Brown grew up in seven different states. His mother, Colleen Birdnow Brown, was the president and CEO of Fisher Communications and the chairman of American Apparel's Board of Directors. His father, Guy Brown, is a former local banker.

Brown graduated from Pepperdine University, where he majored in political science and economics. After graduation, he worked a variety of jobs in politics and startup tech companies. Brown was working for the NBC Page Program in Burbank, California, and living in his former political science professor's garage when he published Red Rising in 2014.

== Career ==
Brown wrote six novels and faced rejection from over 110 agents before publishing Red Rising. He wrote the novel in two months above his parents' garage in Seattle, Washington.

Red Rising, published in 2014, received widespread positive reviews, and hit #20 on The New York Times Best Seller list. The 2015 sequel, Golden Son, hit #6 on the same list and was equally praised by critics. In 2016, Morning Star reached #2 on the New York Times Best Seller list in Adult Hardcover, Digital Book and cumulative. It also reached #1 on the USA Today Best-Selling Books list.

In February 2014, shortly after the release of Red Rising, Universal Pictures acquired the rights for a film adaptation in a seven-figure auction. Marc Forster is set to direct, with Brown writing the screenplay. Brown told Entertainment Weekly that after completing the original trilogy, "I took a meager little break, mostly to stretch my screenwriting muscles." As of February 2016, the film was still in development, with Brown having written the first two drafts. He said in March 2016, "I have written the first two drafts of the film and now we're on the third. Hopefully it will be greenlit this year. The vision from the film makers is 'Lawrence of Arabia in space', which is terribly exciting for me as it's my favorite film." The rights eventually reverted to Brown, and in January 2018, Brown said he was developing Red Rising as a television series. Brown confirmed in October 2018 that the project had a director and a showrunner, and added that the film rights had also been resold to an unspecified studio.

Brown announced a sequel trilogy in February 2016, to begin with the novel Iron Gold in August 2017. A prequel comic book series, Red Rising: Sons of Ares, debuted in May 2018.

Brown said of his writing:

It has been fun to have it take on a life of its own. I feel like I'm not even creating as much as I'm revealing things, and that's a really lovely thing for me to have because it is so fun to get to explore my own world ... Anyone who writes books is at least mostly an introvert ... It's amazing to be able to share that internalized part of myself, that little world that no one really knows about. I just wrote it down on a piece of paper just to be crazy, and people loving that is so strange.

The author has said that his writing has been "hugely" influenced by his readers' feedback, explaining:

I was able to see which punches connected with the readers. It can teach you to be a better writer. I could see readers' perspectives of Darrow evolve and was able to mold him to evolve with that. I also don't want to take away from the reader's imagination. I don't talk too much about how most of my characters look, I want them to have a tonal quality where the reader creates the image for themselves.

Brown also noted the popularity of his novels among the LGBTQ community, saying "It's amazing that they have found a home in these books ... All these lost souls in my books have connected with people and I find it incredibly moving."

In June 2021, the Red Rising saga had sold over 2 million copies in the US alone, with Brown having announced this on his official Instagram account. In September 2024, Brown took to Instagram again to announce that the Red Rising saga had sold 6 million copies.

In September 2025, Brown announced The Book of Lorn, a new story set in the Red Rising universe. Described as a hybrid between a novella and a graphic novel, the project features artwork by Giannis Milonogiannis and is released in serialized form via Patreon.

In October 2026, reports emerged from Hollywood Reporter that Paramount Pictures had acquired the film rights to Red Rising, with Francis Lawrence attached to direct an adaptation of the first novel from a screenplay by Justin Rhodes, and Brown set to executive produce.

== Reception ==
Marc Snetiker of Entertainment Weekly wrote, "Brown has packed his pages with an astonishing amount of cinematic action and twists", and Jason Sheehan of NPR agreed that "Brown writes layered, flawed characters ... but plot is his most breathtaking strength ... Every action seems to flow into the next." Kirkus Reviews called the third installment, Morning Star, "multilayered and seething with characters who exist in a shadow world between history and myth, much as in Frank Herbert's Dune ... an ambitious and satisfying conclusion to a monumental saga".

Brown is the recipient of the Goodreads 2014 Best New Novelist Award, as well as the Goodreads Best Science Fiction Novel Award in 2015 for Golden Son and in 2016 for Morning Star.

== Bibliography ==
=== Red Rising (2014–2023) ===
Published by Del Rey Books.

No.	Title	Date	ISBN
1	Red Rising	January 28, 2014	978-0-345-53978-6
2	Golden Son	January 6, 2015	978-0-345-53981-6
3	Morning Star	February 9, 2016	978-0-345-53984-7
4	Iron Gold	January 16, 2018	978-0-425-28591-6
5	Dark Age	July 30, 2019	978-0-425-28594-7
6	Light Bringer	July 25, 2023	978-0-425-28597-8
7	Red God (forthcoming)	—	—

=== Red Rising: Sons of Ares (2018–2023) ===
Graphic novel series based on and inspired by Red Rising. Written by Pierce Brown and Rik Hoskin. Published by Dynamite Entertainment.

Vol.	Collection	Date	ISBN
1	Sons of Ares	March 13, 2018	978-1-5241-0492-4
2	Wrath	March 3, 2020	978-1-5241-1207-3
3	Forbidden Song	April 11, 2023	978-1-5241-2351-2

=== Star Wars (2017) ===
Published by Del Rey Books.

Short story	Anthology	Date	ISBN
"Desert Son"	From a Certain Point of View	October 3, 2017	978-0-345-51147-8
