= Red Rising: Sons of Ares =

2017 comic book series by Pierce Brown and Rik Hoskin

- Issue #1 cover (May 2017)

Publication information
- Publisher: Dynamite Entertainment
- Genre: Science fiction
- Publication date: May – October 2017
- No. of issues: 6

Creative team
- Written by: Pierce Brown; Rik Hoskin
- Artist: Eli Powell
- Editor: Joe Rybandt

Red Rising: Sons of Ares is a short comic book series published by Dynamite Entertainment in 2017. A prequel to the Red Rising science fiction series by Pierce Brown, it was written by Brown and Rik Hoskin, with art by Eli Powell. The series explores the origins of the rebel group "Sons of Ares" from Brown's Red Rising novels. The original issues were released through May 10 to October 25 2017 with 6 issues published.

== Plot ==
In a future where the all-powerful Golds rule the universe at the expense of the lower castes, the course of history is changed when one of their number falls in love with a baseborn Red.

== Background ==
Sons of Ares takes place before the events of Brown's Red Rising novels. Hoskin said of the series:

I've worked closely with Pierce to create something that's true to those books, but also feels unique and new. Like the books, ours is a fast-moving story set right across the vast canvas of the freshly-colonized solar system. We're exploring the effects that the inflexible regime has on an individual who's a key figure from the books, looking at the limits of humanity in a dehumanizing system. For me, that's the key to the books—the very human characters striving against a system geared to beating them down. It's harsh, cruel, unfair and—occasionally—uplifting.

Brown said, "It's a dream come true to bring the world of Red Rising to comic books, and a real pleasure Jedi-mind melding with Rik in the writing process. Sons of Ares is a story made for new and veteran readers alike."

== Publication ==
Dynamite and Brown announced the Red Rising prequel comic series in July 2016. Brown explained, "It takes place before Darrow’s story begins. It's about the founding of the Sons of Ares and how they began to destroy the society from within." The entire six-issue series was published during 2017.

A full-cast dramatised audiobook of the graphic novel was released by GraphicAudio in 2020.

== Collected editions ==
Red Rising: Sons of Ares

Title	Material collected	Publication date	ISBN
Pierce Brown’s Red Rising: Sons of Ares – An Original Graphic Novel	Red Rising: Sons of Ares #1-6	March 2018; August 2019	HC: 978-1524104924; SC: 978-1524111465
Pierce Brown’s Red Rising: Sons of Ares – Volume Two: Wrath	Red Rising: Sons of Ares #7-12	February 2020	HC: 978-1524112073
Pierce Brown's Red Rising: Sons of Ares – Volume Three: Forbidden Song	Red Rising: Sons of Ares #13-18	April 2023	HC: 978-1524123512
