= Light Bringer (novel) =

2023 science fiction novel by Pierce Brown

- First edition cover
- Author: Pierce Brown
- Language: English
- Series: Iron Gold
- Release number: 3
- Genre: Science fiction
- Publisher: Del Rey Books (US)
- Publication date: July 25, 2023
- Publication place: United States
- Media type: Print (hardcover); E-book; Audiobook
- Pages: 704
- ISBN: 978-0-425-28597-8
- Preceded by: Dark Age
- Followed by: Red God

Light Bringer is a 2023 science fiction novel by American author Pierce Brown; it is the third book of a tetralogy which continues the story of his Red Rising trilogy (2014–2016). Light Bringer takes place after the events of Dark Age (2019), as the survivors from Mercury make their way to Mars and the Solar Republic.

== Plot ==
Eight months after the Republic loses Mercury to the Society, Darrow and his remaining soldiers hide on the 'trash moon' Marcher-1682. After obtaining fuel, Darrow's soldiers return to Mars while Darrow, Cassius and Aurae sail to rescue Sevro on Venus from Apollonius. However, Sevro has already escaped, and Apollonius captures Darrow and Cassius. Apollonius duels and defeats Darrow, but Sevro bombs the dockyards and rescues Darrow and Cassius. They flee Venus with Aurae, who asks Sevro to lead the Rim's Daughters of Athena, Fitchner's contingency should the Sons of Ares fail.

Lysander is celebrated as Mercury's savior, but still dreams of uniting the system's Golds as Sovereign. He transforms the Morning Star into the Lightbringer. Atalantia discovers the ships and soldiers he had been funneling to Apollonius and orders him to attend her summit on Earth. She intends for Lysander to lead an assault to reclaim Luna, but Lysander defies her, preaching that Gold has lost its way and to reclaim their role as shepherds of the colors, must defeat the Republic on Mars. Many of the Golds rally to him, including Cicero and Julia, but Atalantia kills Lysander's mentor Glirastes in retribution. Lysander reveals to Atalantia he knows of her role in his parents death and Ajax chooses Lysander over Atalantia. She remains to besiege Luna.

While the Society and the Republic's fleets battle in orbit over Mars, Lysander attacks Phobos. Thousands are killed in battle, both Kavax and Cicero are gravely injured, and Virginia is forced to retreat deeper into the moon. She releases Valdir from prison to escape Apollonius. Ajax is killed by Victra and Thraxa. Lysander parleys with Virginia, who relinquishes Phobos' dockyards in exchange for her forces' safe passage to Mars and a prisoner swap of Kavax for Cicero. At a celebration, Lysander informs Diomedes of his intent to launch an Iron Rain on Mars within days, but is poisoned and falls into a coma. Darrow contacts Virginia who orders him to avoid the siege of Mars in favor of retrieving Quicksilver's supposed fleet from the Asteroid Belt, whose location was discovered by Lyria.

Lyria, searching for answers about Figment's parasite in the Belt, is rescued from a cohort of Rim Golds by Matteo. He offers her a choice to repair the parasite, gaining significant physical and cognitive enhancements, at the cost of her memories. Lyria chooses to have it removed. Darrow's group find Quicksilver, Matteo and Lyria. Quicksilver reveals that he has not built a fleet but an interstellar generation ship containing non-Color Homo sapiens children. He has charted the ship to escape the Solar System as insurance for mankind, believing the war will eventually consume all the worlds. Quicksilver outfits Darrow to travel to the Rim and recruit the Daughter's fleet, Lyria joins as a stowaway, and Sevro joins after Lyria reveals Ulysses' death. Cassius trains Darrow in his style of swordsmanship.

Volsung Fá's Volk Obsidians and Ascomanni tribes attack the moons of Jupiter, drawing the Dominion's forces from Mars; a recuperating Lysander joins Diomedes on his flagship. At the moon Kalyke, Helios boards the Dustmaker, but is revealed to be Atlas carved in Helios' likeness. In vengeance for the Rim's two rebellions against the Society, Atlas decimates the Rim's fleet, killing Dido and Helios. Lysander is captured but helps Diomedes escape. Lysander's Dux, Rhone, is revealed to be behind his poisoning and has allied with Atlas. Atlas, the puppet master behind Fá, arranges for Lysander to "save" the Rim from the Obsidians, intending to have Lysander, not Atalantia, lead the Society into a new era of peace. To spare civilian lives, Lysander agrees to perpetuate the lie of Fá. Fá razes Io and enslaves its inhabitants, bombs Callisto, then invades Europa. Volga leads the Obsidians at his side.

Darrow's group rescue Diomedes from the wreckage at Kalyke, taking him captive. On Io, they contact the Daughters, who rescue enslaved Ionians from the Obsidians with Darrow and Cassius. Darrow's group enters the Daughters' base below the oceans of Europa where Athena puts Darrow and Diomedes on trial for Darrow's betrayal of the Rim's Sons of Ares to Romulus and for Diomedes' failure to protect the lowColors of Rim society. Sevro intervenes to have Darrow, Diomedes and Cassius spared to join the Daughters' fight against Fá.

Lyria is smuggled to Volga, who reveals she is now willingly working with Fá and seeking to form an Obsidian homeland. However, when Fá orders Volga to kill Lyria, she cannot. Darrow interrupts, challenging Fá to a duel. Darrow publicly defeats Fá, who tries to flee, but is cornered and confesses to serving Atlas before the Obsidians. Darrow allows Volga to decide Fá's fate and she kills him. Darrow arranges an election for Obsidian leadership and Volga becomes Queen of the Obsidians.

Lysander's forces arrive and massacre the Ascomanni in the Garter, broadcasting Io's liberation. Diomedes organizes a meeting between Lysander and Darrow, urging them to form an alliance against the Core Golds and establish peace built on compromise. Darrow is willing, but Lysander is unsure. As Lysander considers the offer on the Lightbringer, Cassius arrives and proposes that they kill Atlas, freeing Lysander from his schemes. Atlas returns after retrieving a biological weapon Eidmi, which can eliminate any selected Color on any planet. Lysander and Cassius fight and kill Rhone and Atlas, though with his final words Atlas reveals that Lysander is using Cassius to obtain Eidmi. Cassius wants Eidmi destroyed but Lysander wants to control it, seeing it as the only way to ensure peace and end the war. When Cassius tries to take it by force, Lysander kills him.

Gaia captures Darrow, intent on maintaining Atlas' lie of Volsung Fá and make peace with Atalantia to preserve the Gold hierarchy. However, Diomedes demands Gaia abandon the hierarchy or kill him and Gaia relents. The Moon Lords elect Diomedes as their leader and Darrow publicly presents the head of Fá and apologizes for his destruction of the Ganymede dockyards. With Gaia's support, the Moon Lords are prepared to ally with the Republic and Lysander against Atalantia and Atlas, but Lysander fails to show at the summit. He contacts them remotely, lying that Cassius attempted to assassinate him and uses this as pretext to devastate Io, destroying the Rim's capacity to feed itself and enriching the Core. As the fleets of Athena and Volga converge on Io, Lysander's forces flee for the Core; he ponders using Eidmi on Red or Gold. The Republic, the Rim Dominion, the Daughters and the Volk enter an uneasy alliance and their combined forces leave for Mars.

== Characters ==
The Solar Republic

- Darrow of Lykos, a.k.a the "Reaper" and the "Morning Star" (Red): a Red physically remade into a Gold to infiltrate and destroy the Society. The former ArchImperator of the Solar Republic, now operating in exile.
- Virginia Augustus, a.k.a. "Mustang" and "Lionheart" (Gold): reigning Sovereign of the Solar Republic; daughter of the former ArchGovernor of Mars, Primus of House Augustus, Darrow's wife, and mother of their son Pax.
- Pax Augustus (Gold/Red): son of Darrow and Virginia, training to be a pilot
- Dio of Lykos (Red): sister of Eo, wife of Kieran, mother of Rhonna
- Kieran of Lykos (Red): brother of Darrow, a Howler.
- Rhonna of Lykos (Red): daughter of Kieran, lancer to Darrow, a Howler, lost in the fall of Heliopolis
- Deanna of Lykos (Red): mother of Darrow and Kieran
- Sevro Barca, a.k.a. "Goblin" and "Ares" (Gold/Red): Imperator of the Republic, Darrow's best friend and second-in-command, husband to Victra, a Howler
- Victra Barca (Gold): Darrow's former lieutenant, Sevro's wife, and a wealthy shipping magnate in the Solar Republic.
- Electra Barca (Gold): eldest daughter of Sevro and Victra
- Ulysses Barca (Gold): son of Sevro and Victra, killed by Harmony and the Red Hand
- Dancer O'Faran (Red): Darrow's former mentor in the Sons of Ares, a powerful senator in the Republic and leader of the Vox Populi, a socialist faction opposing Virginia. Killed in the Day of Red Doves.
- Kavax Telemanus (Gold): longtime ally to Virginia and Darrow, Primus of House Telemanus, father of Daxo, Thraxa, and the deceased Pax au Telemanus
- Niobe Telemanus (Gold): Kavax's wife
- Daxo Telemanus (Gold): son of Kavax, Tribune of the Gold bloc in the Solar Republic, ally of Virginia. Killed in the Day of Red Doves.
- Thraxa Telemanus (Gold): Praetor of the Free Legions, daughter of Kavax and Niobe, one of Darrow's trusted Howlers.
- Alexandar au Arcos (Gold): eldest grandson and heir of Lorn, lancer to Darrow, a Howler. Killed by Lysander au Lune.
- Cadus Harnassus (Orange): Imperator of the Republic, former second in command of the Free Legions
- Orion Aquarii (Blue): Navarch of the Republic, Imperator of the White Fleet, longtime ally of Darrow. Killed in Operation Tartarus.
- Colloway Char (Blue): Pilot, reigning kill-leader of the Republic Navy, a Howler
- Oro Sculpturus (Blue): Pilot, Navarch of the Republic, leader of Phobos' astral defense.
- Holiday Nakamura (Gray): Dux of Virginia's Lionguard, sister of Trigg, Centurion of the Pegasus Legion
- Regulus Sun, a.k.a. "Quicksilver" (Silver): the richest man in the known worlds, head of Sun Industries and co-founder of the Sons of Ares.
- Matteo Sun (Pink): husband to Regulus Sun
- Theodora (Pink): Leader of the Splinter Operatives, Virginia's spymaster, a former Rose. Executed by the Vox Populi.
- Clown (Gold): a Howler
- Pebble (Gold): a Howler
- Min-Min (Red): sniper, munitions expert, a Howler
- Screwface (Gold): a Howler
- Cassius Bellona (Gold): Darrow's friend, former Morning Knight under Octavia au Lune, former caretaker and mentor of Lysander.

The Society Remnant

- Atalantia au Grimmus (Gold): Dictator of the Society, the Ash Lord's sole remaining daughter, sister to Aja and Moira au Grimmus.
- Lysander au Lune (Gold): grandson and heir to former Sovereign Octavia au Lune. Recently returned from exile
- Atlas au Raa a.k.a. the "Fear Knight" (Gold): brother to Romulus, Legate of the Zero Legion ("the Gorgons")
- Ajax au Grimmus a.k.a. the "Storm Knight" (Gold): son of Aja au Grimmus and Atlas au Raa, heir of House Grimmus, Legate of the Iron Leopards
- Kalindora au San a.k.a. the "Love Knight" (Gold): aunt to Alexander au Arcos, childhood friend of Atalantia au Grimmus and Anastasia au Lune. Poisoned by Atalantia
- Julia au Bellona (Gold): Cassius's estranged mother who harbors a fervent hatred of Darrow for killing her son, Julian. Primus of House Bellona, Princeps Senatus of the Two Hundred
- Pallas au Grecca (Gold): captain of the Bellona chariot team, agent of Julia
- Scorpio au Votum (Gold): former Primus of House Votum, Legate of the Scorpion Legion. Killed by Darrow on Mercury.
- Cicero au Votum (Gold): son of Scorpio, Primus of House Votum, Legate of the Scorpion Legion
- Horatia au Votum (Gold): daughter of Scorpio, member of the Reformer Bloc in the Two Hundred
- Asmodeus au Carthii (Gold): Primus of House Carthii, the shipbuilders of Venus
- Scipio au Falthe (Gold): Primus of House Falthe, the purity-obsessed war masters of Earth
- Valeria au Carthii (Gold): daughter of Asmodeus and one of his many heirs
- Rhone ti Flavinius (Gray): Dux of Lysander, Lunese subPraetor, former second officer of XIII Dracones Praetorian Guard under Aja au Grimmus
- Demetrius ti Interimo (Gray): Lunese archCenturion of Legio XIII Dracones
- Markus ti Lacrima (Gray): Lunese centurion of Legio XIII Dracones
- Drusilla ti Pistris (Gray): Lunese centurion of Legio XIII Dracones
- Kyber ti Umbra (Gray): Lunese legionnaire of Legio XIII Dracones, whisper to Lysander au Lune
- Magnus au Grimmus, a.k.a. the "Ash Lord" (Gold): Former ArchImperator under Octavia, the Burner of Rhea, killed by the Howlers and Apollonius au Valii-Rath on Venus
- Octavia au Lune (Gold): Former Sovereign of the Society, grandmother to Lysander, killed by Darrow twelve years previously.
- Aja au Grimmus (Gold): Former Protean Knight under Octavia, daughter of the Ash Lord, killed by Sevro twelve years previously.
- Glirastes the Master Maker (Orange): Mercurian architect and inventor
- Exeter (Brown): Valet to Glirastes
- Pytha xe Virgus (Blue): Captain of the Lightbringer, former co-pilot of the Archimedes

The Rim Dominion

- Dido au Raa (Gold): Co-consul of the Rim Dominion, wife of former Sovereign of the Rim Dominion, Romulus au Raa, a native Venusian of House Saud.
- Diomedes au Raa, a.k.a. the "Storm Knight" (Gold): eldest remaining son of Romulus and Dido, a blademaster and Taxiarchos of the Lightning Phalanx
- Seraphina au Raa (Gold): the remaining daughter of Romulus and Dido, a blademaster and Lochagos of the Eleventh Dust Walkers. Killed on Mercury
- Marius au Raa (Gold): Quaestor, and son of Romulus and Dido
- Helios au Lux (Gold): Co-consul of the Rim Dominion with Dido, former Truth Knight of the Rim
- Gaia au Raa (Gold): mother to Romulus, Vela, and Atlas, grandmother to Diomedes, Seraphina, Marius, and Thalia
- Thalia au Raa (Gold): youngest daughter of Romulus and Dido, sister of Diomedes
- Vela au Raa (Gold): Sister of Atlas and Romulus, a Legate
- Romulus au Raa a.k.a. "The Lord of the Dust" (Gold): former Sovereign of the Rim Dominion and Primus of House Raa, killed by ceremonial suicide
- Grecca au Codovan (Gold): Primus of House Codovan, Lady of Ganymede

The Obsidian

- Sefi the Quiet (Obsidian): Queen of the Obsidians and sister to fallen hero Ragnar Volarus, leader of the Valkyrie. Killed by Volsung Fá
- Valdir the Unshorn (Obsidian): Warlord and royal concubine of Sefi. Imprisoned for treason against the Republic.
- Ragnar Volarus aka "The Shield of Tinos" (Obsidian): Former leader of the Obsidian, brother to Sefi, a Howler, killed by Aja au Grimmus twelve years previously
- Volsung Fá (Obsidian): King of the Obsidian, father of Sefi and Ragnar, grandfather of Volga Fjorgan, once known as Vagnar Hefga.
- Volga Fjorgan (Obsidian): Daughter of Ragnar, former freelancer and colleague of Ephraim ti Horn
- Ur the Eater of Joy (Obsidian): Named Spear of the Throne of Ultima Thule, an Ascomanni warrior
- Skarde Olsgur (Obsidian): Jarl of the Volk, tribe of the Blood Ram, former ally of Darrow
- Sigurd Olsgur (Obsidian): son of Skarde, brave of the Blood Ram, former ally of Darrow

Other Characters

- Aurae (Pink): A Raa hetaera and companion to Cassius
- Apollonius au Valii-Rath, a.k.a "The Minotaur" (Gold): heir of House Valii-Rath, verbose
- Tharsus au Valii-Rath, a.k.a "The Vampire of Thessalonica" (Gold): brother of Apollonius
- Vorkian ti Hadriana (Gray): Centurion in the Rath house legions
- Lyria of Lagalos (Red): a Gamma Martian Red, friend of Volga Fjorgan, and former employee of House Telemanus
- Liam of Lagalos (Red): a blind Gamma Martian Red, nephew of Lyria, client of House Telemanus
- Cheon (Red): Chiliarch of the Black Owls, a Daughter of Athena
- Harmony (Red): Leader of the terrorist group "the Red Hand", former Sons of Ares lieutenant. Responsible for the deaths of Lyria's family on Mars. Dies after being thrown into a nest of pit vipers by Victra and Lyria.
- Figment (Brown): a mysterious Freelancer, dead.
- Mickey (Violet): the Rising carver who remade Darrow into a Gold.
- Fitchner au Barca a.k.a the "Rage Knight" and "Ares" (Gold): former leader of the Sons of Ares, father of Sevro, killed by Cassius au Bellona
- Ephraim ti Horn (Gray): Freelancer, former son of Ares, husband of Trigg ti Nakamura. Killed by Volsung Fá.

== Reception ==
The week of August 7, 2023, Light Bringer landed on Publishers Weekly's best seller lists in second place for fiction and fifth overall. The following week, it ranked second on the New York Times Best Seller List for Hardcover Fiction and USA Today's Best-selling Booklist for fiction.

According to Brian Kitson of The Cosmic Circus, if readers are "looking for another well-written science-fiction/fantasy novel on audio, then Light Bringer should definitely be on [their] list". Booklist also reviewed the novel.

In 2023, Light Bringer placed second in the Goodreads Choice Award for Science Fiction. Barnes & Noble named it one of the best science fiction books of the year.
