= Cino Del Duca =

Businessman, film producer and philanthropist

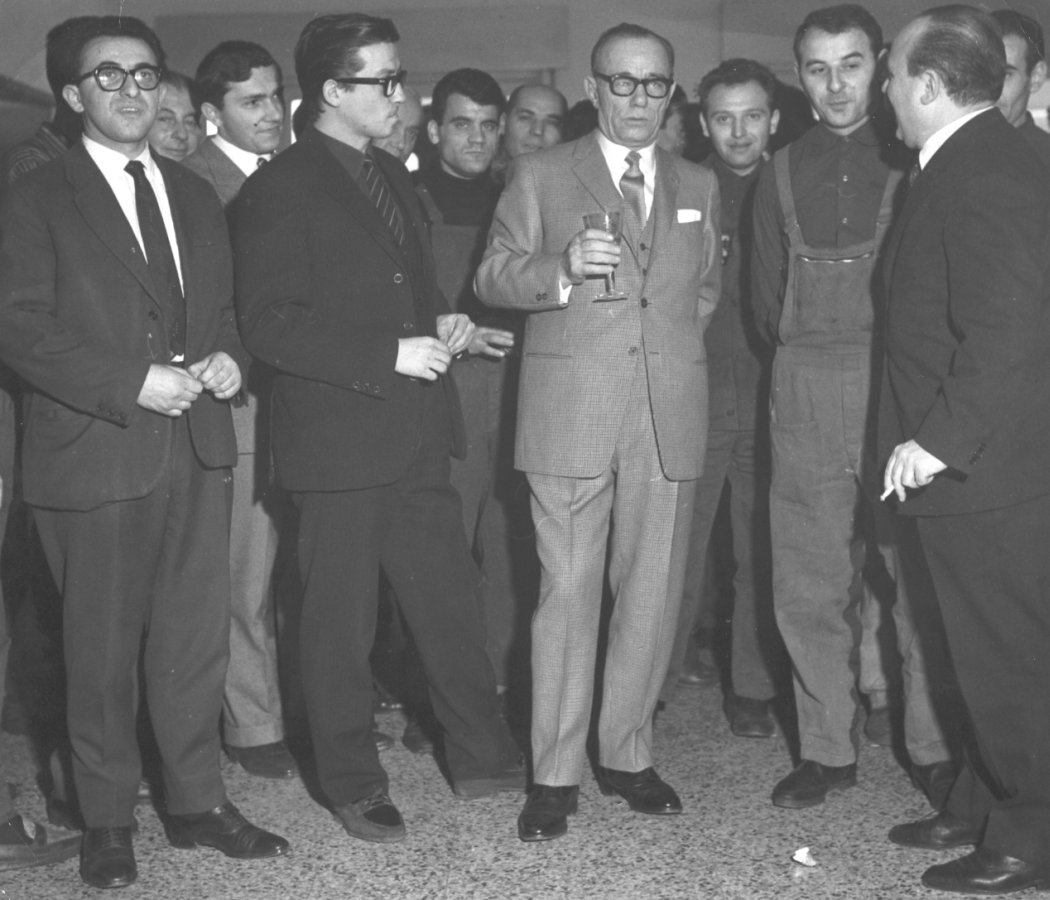
- Cino Del Duca, at center with glass
- Born: 25 July 1899; Montedinove, Italy
- Died: 24 May 1967 (aged 67); Milan, Italy

Cino Del Duca (25 July 1899 – 24 May 1967) was an Italian-born businessman, film producer, and philanthropist who moved to France in 1923, where he made a fortune in the French publishing business.

== Biography ==
Cino Del Duca was born in Montedinove in the Province of Ascoli Piceno, Cino Del Duca played a major role in the French Resistance during the German occupation of France in World War II. His service to help liberate the country from the Nazis earned him the Croix de Guerre.

Del Duca began with a small printing shop in Paris and eventually expanded into various publishing businesses. After World War II, he founded a weekly magazine Grand Hotel in 1947. He also established the Franc Tireur in 1949 and the Paris-Journal in 1957. Two years later he merged the two as the morning tabloid Paris-Jour that proved successful in a highly competitive, and at the time, overly saturated, Paris newspaper market. He built a publishing empire in France anchored by a series of very successful magazines such as Nous Deux, Télé Poche (founded 1966), Modes de Paris, Les Editions mondiales and others. His companies published journals such as Hurrah! (1935–1953) and L'Aventureux (1936–1942) plus through his agency Mondial Presse he acquired the French language publishing rights to English language comic strips and series such as Tarzan by Edgar Rice Burroughs. As well, his book publishing company, Éditions Mondiales Del Duca, was also very successful. Under the name of World Editions, the New York company office founded the magazine Fascination, which was a heavy loss, and in 1951 a famous digest-size science fiction magazine, Galaxy Science Fiction.

In 1952 Del Duca established La Bourse Del Duca that awarded a medallion and a cash prize to support first-time authors.

In 1954, Cino Del Duca entered the motion picture production business. Between then and 1962 he helped finance and produce eight feature films including 1960's acclaimed L'avventura.

Cino Del Duca expanded his media empire into the Federal Republic of Germany, Great Britain, and his native Italy. His business successes earned him great wealth and he became a benefactor to a number of charitable causes. As a hobby, he acquired a 55 hectare property at Biéville-Quétiéville in the Calvados département in what is part of a large horse farm area of Normandy. Del Duca's Haras de Quétiéville racing stable and stud farm was a prominent part of thoroughbred horse racing in France and in 1951 their stallion Prince Bio was the country's leading sire.

== Significant investments in Italy ==
Cino Del Duca expanded his publishing business to Italy in 1951. His Milan book publishing company brought out works translated into the Italian language from English, French and other notable writers such as Romain Gary and Elizabeth Peters. With Gaetano Baldacci and Enrico Mattei, in April 1956 Cino Del Duca founded the Il Giorno newspaper in Milan.

In 1955, he rescued the A.S. Ascoli football team in Ascoli Piceno from bankruptcy. He built the Stadio Cino e Lillo Del Duca (stadium) in 1962 where the team still plays and which bears his name. The team carried the name "Del Duca Ascoli" until it was sold by his widow following his death in 1967.

== Legacy ==
Cino Del Duca died in 1967 and was buried in Père Lachaise Cemetery in Paris. The Rue Cino Del Duca in Biarritz is named in his honor as is another street in the 17th arrondissement of Paris.

His widow Simone used their great wealth to continue and expand their philanthropic works. In 1969 she established the Prix mondial Cino Del Duca, an international literary award with a substantial cash prize. In 1975 she created the Simone and Cino Del Duca Foundation to oversee all the various charitable involvements. The Foundation became a significant patron of the arts in France and a very important benefactor to medical researchers worldwide.

== Bourse Cino del Duca Laureates (non-exhaustive list) ==
- Jean-Luc Coatelem
- Régine Detambel
- Paul Fournel
- Charles Le Quintrec
- Hervé Le Tellier
- Jean-Marc Lovay
- Gilles Paris
- Henri Pigaillem
