= Simone and Cino Del Duca Foundation =

Charitable foundation based in Paris, France

The Simone and Cino Del Duca Foundation is a charitable foundation based in Paris, France.

== History ==
It was established in 1975 by Simone Del Duca (1912–2004), widow of publishing magnate Cino Del Duca (1899–1967). The Foundation took over responsibility for the existing Prix mondial Cino Del Duca created by Madame Del Duca in 1969.

The Foundation has been a substantial and important contributor to the arts in France and humanities worldwide. It has provided very significant support for scientific research, in particular for biomedical research and including oncology, biochemistry, and molecular genetics. The Foundation has funded a Fellowship for such things as a Postdoctoral for Studies in Neurobiology and funding for breast cancer research for organizations such as the Susan G. Komen for the Cure. As well, the "Simone and Cino Del Duca Foundation on Cancer Pharmacotherapy" paid for and published the 1983 book: Current Drugs And Methods of Cancer Treatment (Masson Pub. USA ISBN 0-89352-201-5)

The Simone and Cino Del Duca Foundation provides two major arts prizes through the French Académie des Beaux-Arts. A prize in music is awarded annually, plus one that is given on an alternating basis to painters and sculptors. In addition, the Foundation helped fund the major restoration of the collections of the Musée Condé at Chantilly, Oise.

The Foundation also gives a prize in archaeology, intended to help with archaeology projects in France or abroad.

Following the death of Madame Del Duca in 2004, administration of the Foundation has been assumed by the Institut de France.

In March 2025, the foundation marked its 50th anniversary by launching a Youth Prize intended to support young talents in the arts and humanities. The initiative aims to encourage emerging cultural contributions within a context of evolving public funding landscapes.
