= Simone Del Duca =

French businesswoman (1912–2004)

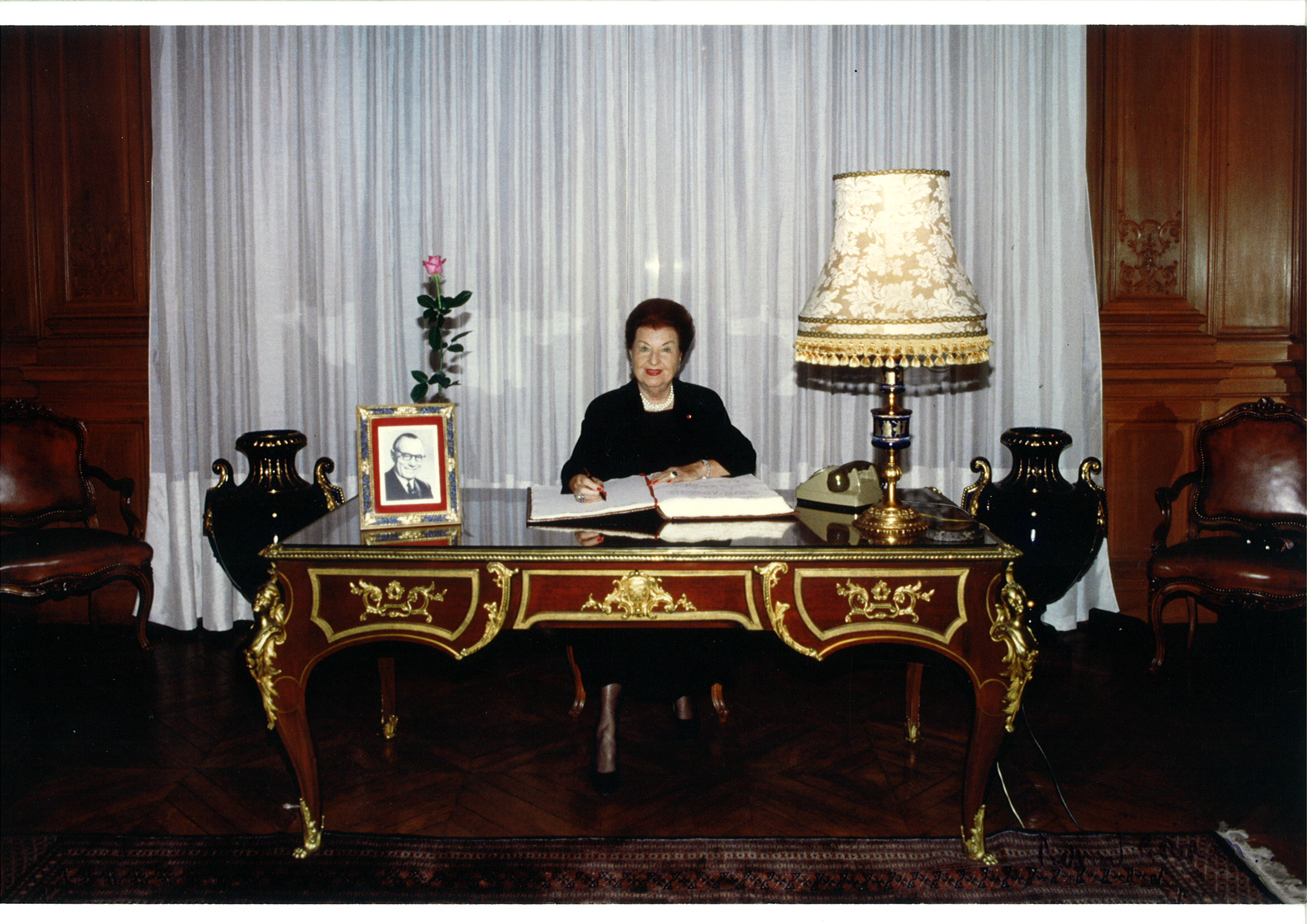
Image of Simone Del Duca

Simone Del Duca (18 July 1912 – 16 May 2004) was a French businesswoman, a member of the Académie des Beaux-Arts, and major philanthropist. Married to Italian publishing magnate Cino Del Duca, on his death in 1967 she was left with a considerable fortune. Although she remained on the board of directors of her late husband's companies, Simone Del Duca devoted a great deal of her time to philanthropic causes. In 1969 she established a prestigious literary prize in her husband's name. The Prix mondial Cino Del Duca provides a substantial cash prize and was made open to qualified persons from anywhere in the world.

Simone Del Duca's charitable activities increased to where in 1975 she created the Simone and Cino Del Duca Foundation in homage to her husband. The Foundation's primary involvements gave support for scientific research and after being made a member of the Académie des Beaux-Arts in 1994 she funded two major prizes in visual arts and music awarded through the Académie. Simone Del Duca's philanthropic work was recognized by the government of France who made her a commander of the Legion of Honor.

== Thoroughbred racing ==
Beyond her husband's business and her charitable foundation, Simone Del Duca continued to own and operate their Haras de Quétiéville thoroughbred horse racing stable and stud farm in Biéville-Quétiéville, Calvados. Located in the Basse-Normandie region, an area famous for its many important horse farms, she bred horses that raced at the Deauville racecourse. Her colt, Herbager won the 1959 French Classic, the Prix du Jockey Club, and was named French Champion Three-Year-Old Colt. In 1962, her horse Soltikoff won France's most prestigious race, the Prix de l'Arc de Triomphe. Another of her horses, Marly River, won 1987 French Horse of the Year honors in hurdling.

Simone Del Duca died in 2004 at the age of 91 and was interred with her husband in Père Lachaise Cemetery in Paris.

== Distinctions ==
- 1971 : Commander of the Legion of Honour
