= DUCA Credit Union =

Canadian credit union

DUCA Financial Services Credit Union Ltd.
- Type: Credit Union
- Industry: Financial Services
- Founded: 1954
- Headquarters: Toronto, Canada
- Number of locations: 17 branches
- Key people: Doug Conick (CEO)
- Number of employees: 300+
- Website: www.duca.com

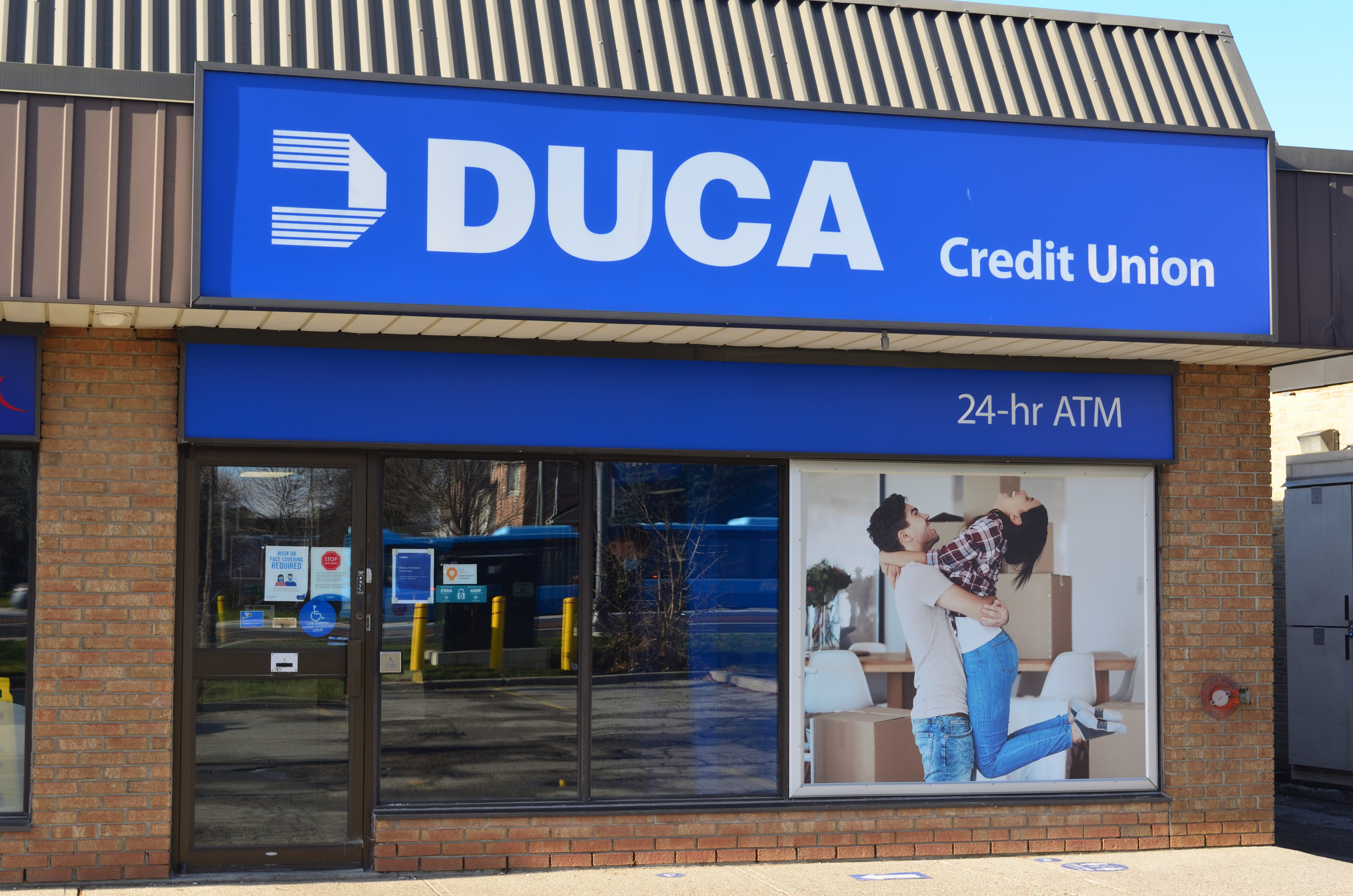
DUCA Credit Union in Richmond Hill

DUCA Financial Services Credit Union Limited, commonly shortened to DUCA Credit Union, is a Canadian credit union. Financial products include chequing and savings accounts, loans, mortgages, insurance and small business products. It is a member-owned institution and its deposits are insured through the Financial Services Regulatory Authority of Ontario.

== History ==
DUCA was established on May 5, 1954, by Dutch immigrants to Canada under the name Dutch Canadian Toronto Credit Union Ltd.

The company introduced a profit sharing program in 1997. In 2010, DUCA shared $7 million with members.

On November 1, 2000, the credit union changed its official name to its current DUCA Financial Services Credit Union Ltd. DUCA has merged with other credit unions, including Torcity Savings Credit Union, Dutch Canadian Credit Union and Virtual One Credit Union Ltd.

Today, DUCA has over 83,000 members and over $6 billion in assets.

In 2009, DUCA joined the Exchange Network increasing the number of ATMs accessible to members. DUCA is also a member of Interac.

DUCA is currently on a rapid growth phase—its net branch deposits grew by 99% in 2018 compared to the prior year. This was in large measure due to the 3% annual interest rate being offered to new members who open an Earn More Savings Account (EMSA), which is among the highest rates offered in Canada. The Earn More Savings Promotional Account with 3% interest is closed to new participants effective May 16, 2019.

== Predecessors ==
Virtual One Credit Union was originally known as Camera Heights Credit Union and was established to serve the employees of Kodak Canada. Virtual One merged with 10 other credit unions, including:

- Photel (Toronto) Credit Union Limited (April 2006)
- Molson Brewery Employees Credit Union Limited (May 2006)
- Tobacco Workers' (Guelph) Credit Union Limited (May 2006)
- Oregon Employees Credit Union Limited (September 2008)
