= Prix mondial Cino Del Duca =

Prix mondial Cino Del Duca (Cino Del Duca World Prize)
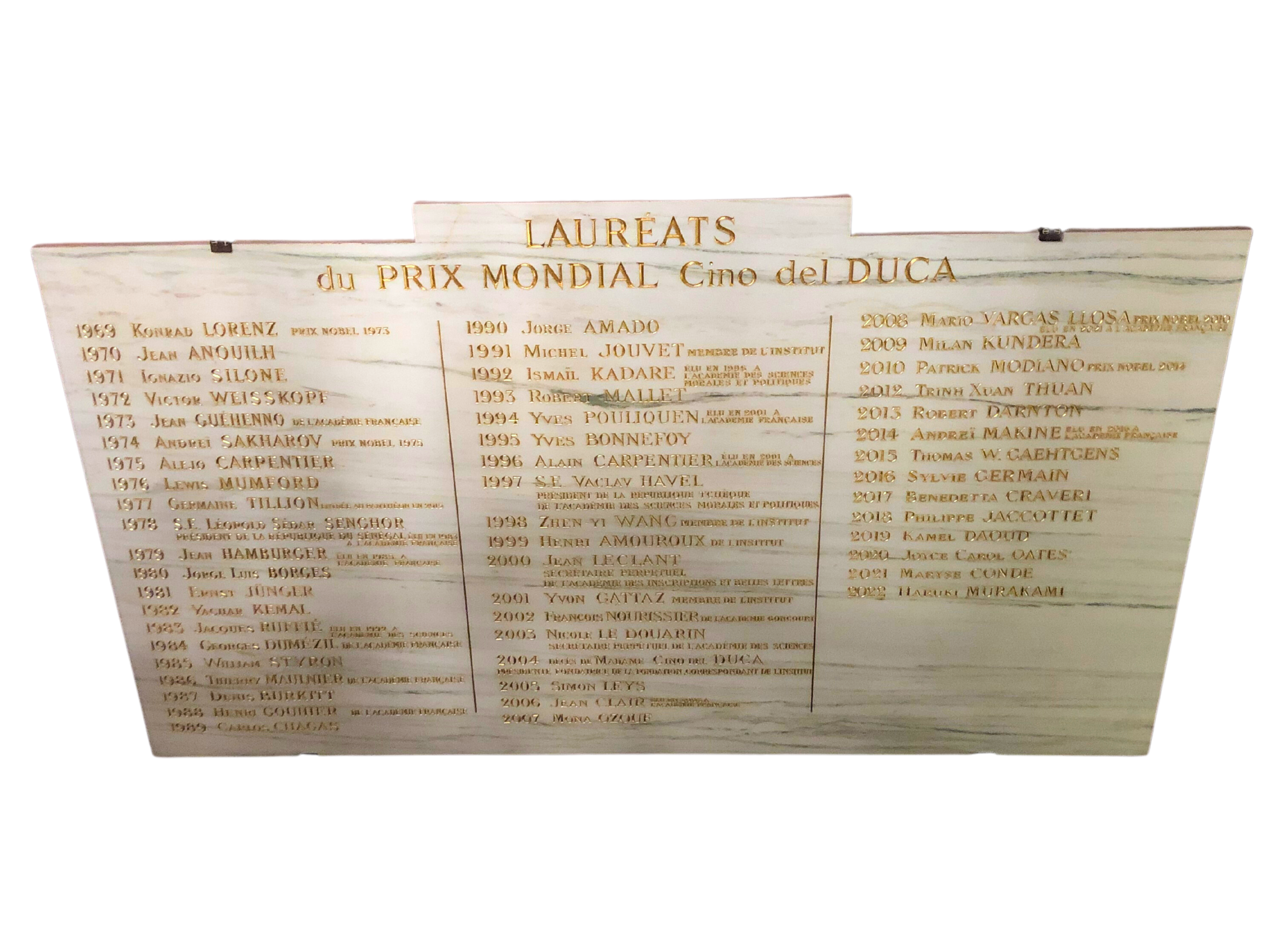
- Plaque of the Cino Del Duca World Prize Laureates
- Date: Established in 1969
- Country: France
- Presented by: Simone and Cino Del Duca Foundation (under the auspices of the Institut de France)
- Reward: 200,000 € prize
- First award: 1969
- Website: https://www.fondation-del-duca.fr/prix-mondial

The Prix mondial Cino Del Duca (Cino Del Duca World Prize) is an international literary award from France. With an award amount of €200,000, it is among the richest literary prizes.

== Origins and operations ==
It was established in 1969 in France by French businesswoman Simone Del Duca (1912–2004) to continue the work of her Italian-born French husband, publishing magnate Cino Del Duca (1899–1967).

The award recognizes an author whose work constitutes, in a scientific or literary form, a message of modern humanism. The award's prize has been valued as high as 300,000 € over the years; in 2016 it was 200,000.

In 1975, Madame Del Luca established the Simone and Cino Del Duca Foundation for a variety of philanthropic purposes and it assumed responsibility for the award. Following her death in 2004, the foundation was placed under the auspices of the Institut de France.

== Honorees ==
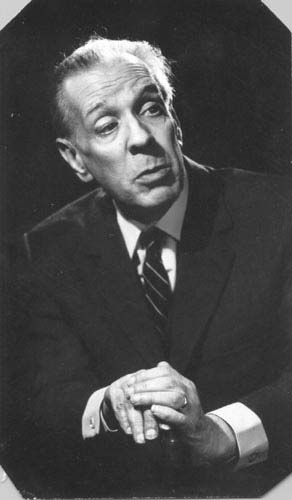
Jorge Luis Borges

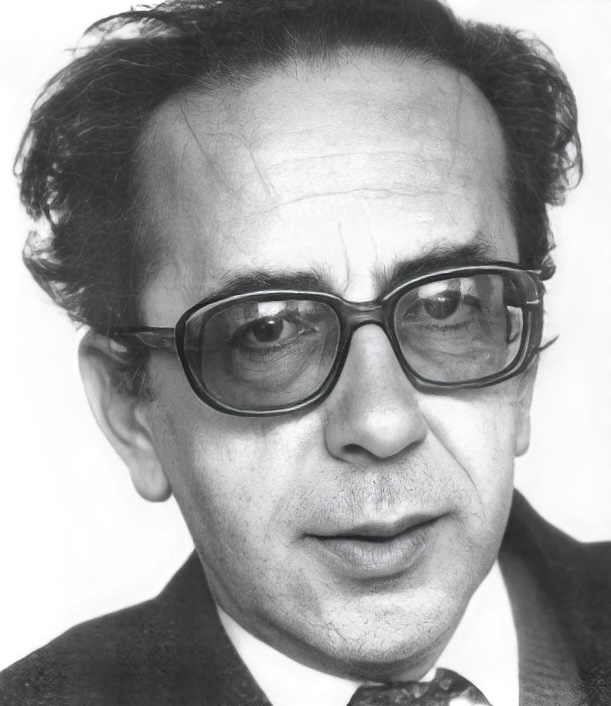
Ismail Kadare

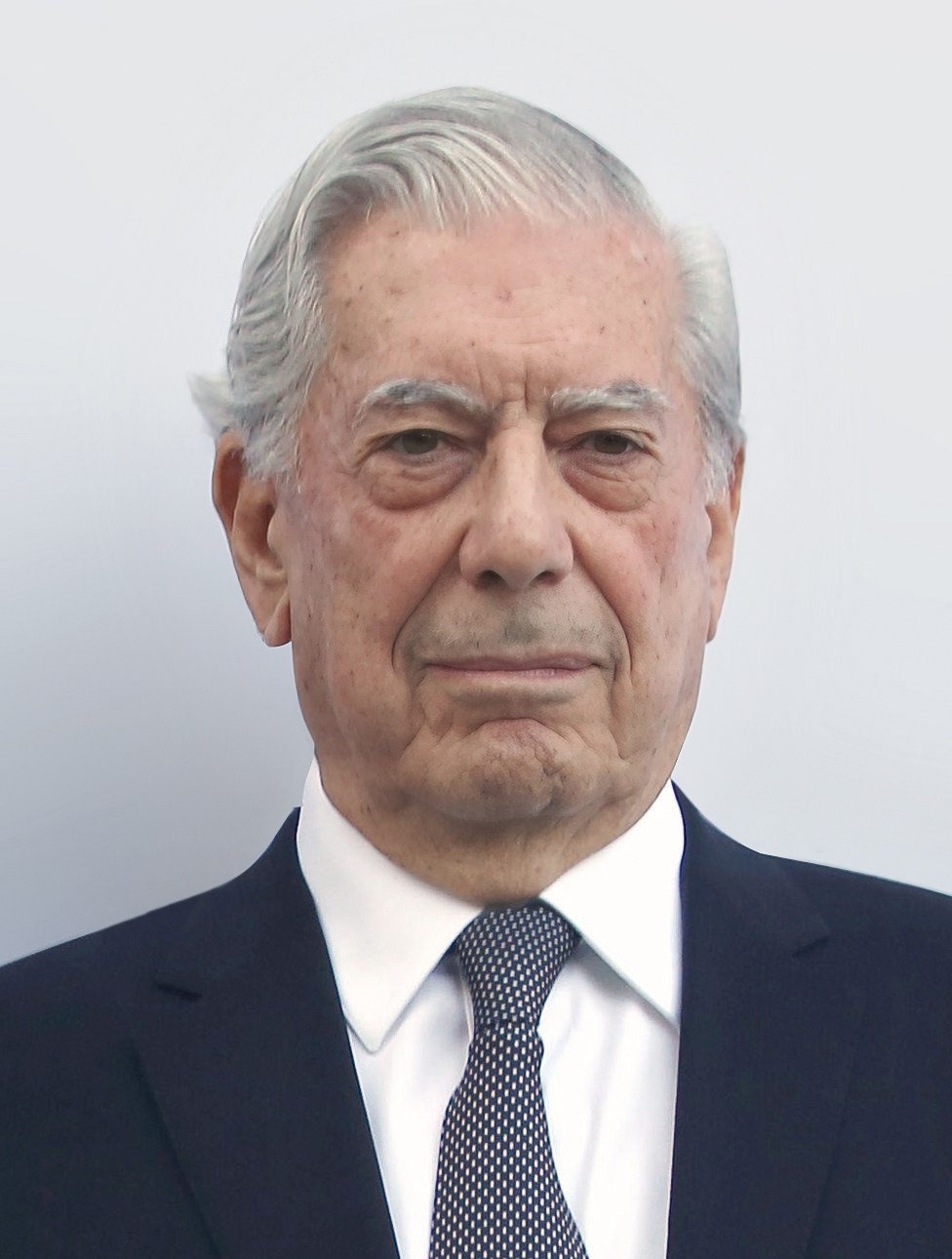
Mario Vargas Llosa

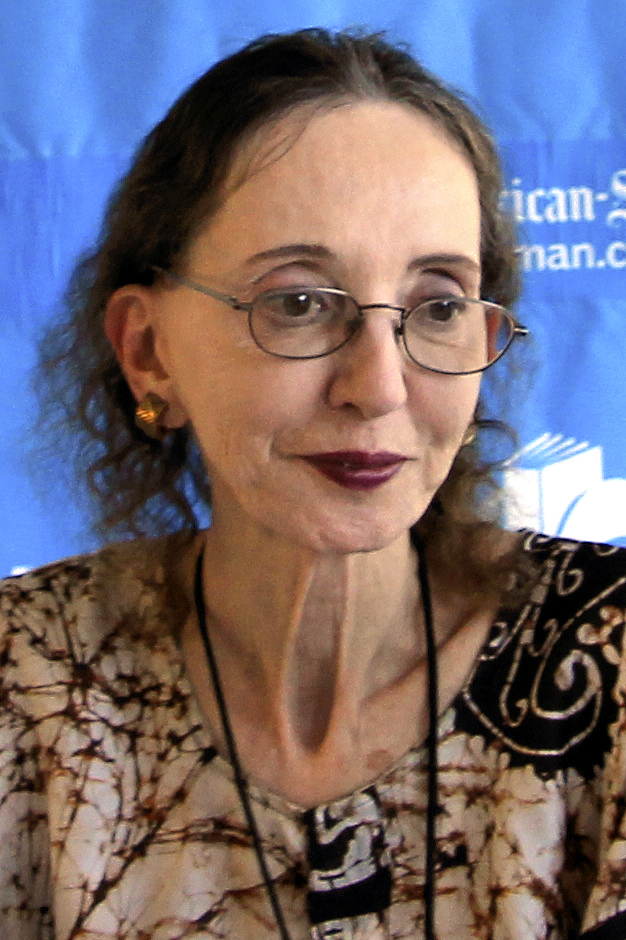
Joyce Carol Oates

The prizewinners include:

- 1969 : Konrad Lorenz, Austrian zoologist and ornithologist
- 1970 : Jean Anouilh, French dramatist
- 1971 : Ignazio Silone, Italian author
- 1972 : Victor Weisskopf, Austrian-American physicist
- 1973 : Jean Guéhenno, French writer
- 1974 : Andrei Sakharov, Soviet nuclear physicist
- 1975 : Alejo Carpentier, Cuban writer
- 1976 : Lewis Mumford, American historian
- 1977 : Germaine Tillion, French anthropologist
- 1978 : Léopold Sédar Senghor, Senegalese poet and statesman
- 1979 : Jean Hamburger, French surgeon and essayist
- 1980 : Jorge Luis Borges, Argentine writer
- 1981 : Ernst Jünger, German author
- 1982 : Yaşar Kemal, Turkish writer
- 1983 : Jacques Ruffié, French writer and educator
- 1984 : Georges Dumézil, French comparative philologist
- 1985 : William Styron, American novelist
- 1986 : Thierry Maulnier, French writer
- 1987 : Denis Burkitt, British surgeon
- 1988 : Henri Gouhier, French philosopher and historian
- 1989 : Carlos Chagas Filho, Brazilian physician and biologist
- 1990 : Jorge Amado, Brazilian novelist
- 1991 : Michel Jouvet, French neurological researcher
- 1992 : Ismail Kadare, Albanian writer
- 1993 : Robert Mallet, French poet and essayist
- 1994 : Yves Pouliquen, French medical researcher
- 1995 : Yves Bonnefoy, French poet and essayist
- 1996 : Alain F. Carpentier, French heart surgeon
- 1997 : Václav Havel, Czech writer and statesman
- 1998 : Zhen-yi Wang, Chinese pathophysiologist
- 1999 : Henri Amouroux, French historian
- 2000 : Jean Leclant, French Egyptologist
- 2001 : Yvon Gattaz, French businessman
- 2002 : François Nourissier, French writer
- 2003 : Nicole Le Douarin, French embryologist
- 2004 : (no prize awarded)
- 2005 : Simon Leys, Belgian writer
- 2006 : Jean Clair, French essayist and art historian
- 2007 : Mona Ozouf, French historian and writer
- 2008 : Mario Vargas Llosa, Peruvian and Spanish writer
- 2009 : Milan Kundera, French and Czech writer
- 2010 : Patrick Modiano, French writer
- 2011 : (no prize awarded)
- 2012 : Trinh Xuan Thuan, Vietnamese astronomer and writer
- 2013 : Robert Darnton, American cultural historian
- 2014 : Andreï Makine, French writer
- 2015 : Thomas W. Gaehtgens, German historian
- 2016 : Sylvie Germain, French writer
- 2017 : Benedetta Craveri, Italian writer
- 2018 : Philippe Jaccottet, Swiss writer
- 2019 : Kamel Daoud, Algerian writer
- 2020 : Joyce Carol Oates, American writer
- 2021 : Maryse Condé, Guadeloupean-French writer
- 2022 : Haruki Murakami, Japanese writer
- 2023 : Dương Thu Hương, Vietnamese writer
- 2024 : Yasmina Reza, French playwright
- 2025 : Boualem Sansal, Algerian-French author

== Awards by nationality ==
In May 2025, the distribution of prizes by nationality is:

| Nationality | Winners |
|---|---|
| France | 29 |
| United States | 3 |
| Algeria | 2 |
| Germany | 2 |
| Austria | 2 |
| Italy | 2 |
| Austria | 2 |
| Czech Republic | 2 |
| Brazil | 2 |
| Vietnam | 2 |
| Albania | 1 |
| Argentina | 1 |
| Belgium | 1 |
| China | 1 |
| Cuba | 1 |
| United Kingdom | 1 |
| Peru | 1 |
| Senegal | 1 |
| Switzerland | 1 |
| Turkey | 1 |
| Soviet Union | 1 |
| Japan | 1 |
