= Lo Duca =

Lo Duca or LoDuca is a surname. Notable people with the surname include:

- Joseph LoDuca (born 1958), American composer
- Joseph-Marie Lo Duca (1905–2004), Italian writer
- Paul Lo Duca (born 1972), American baseball player
- Tim Lo Duca (born 1985), Slovenian football player
