= Red Rising =

2014 dystopian novel by Pierce Brown

- First edition cover
- Author: Pierce Brown
- Audio read by: Tim Gerard Reynolds (Recorded Books); Various (GraphicAudio)
- Language: English
- Series: Red Rising
- Release number: 1
- Genre: Science fiction
- Publisher: Del Rey Books (US)
- Publication date: January 28, 2014
- Publication place: United States
- Media type: Print (hardcover); E-book; Audiobook
- Pages: 382
- ISBN: 0-345-53978-8
- Followed by: Golden Son

Red Rising is a 2014 dystopian science fiction novel by American author Pierce Brown. It is the first book and eponym of the series. The novel, set in the future on Mars, follows lowborn miner Darrow as he infiltrates the ranks of the elite Golds.

Red Rising has received generally positive reviews, and reached #20 on the New York Times Best Seller list.

== Plot summary ==
Far into the future, the Solar System is ruled by the Society—a rigid social hierarchy in which people are born into one of 14 "Colors" which determines their physical characteristics and specialized roles. The Society is ruled by the mentally and physically superior Golds. Reds are the Society's lowest-status laborers. Mars's underground Red mining colonies harvest Helium-3 fuel for the planet's eventual terraforming, promised that their toil will eventually allow humanity to live on the planet's inhospitable surface.

16-year-old Darrow is a rash, intelligent, newly-wed Red helium-3 miner. Darrow and his wife Eo are publicly whipped for sneaking into a restricted underground forest. With Mars's ArchGovernor Nero Augustus present and the event publicly broadcast, Eo defiantly sings an illegal song protesting the Reds' enslavement. Nero has Eo publicly hanged. A grieving Darrow illegally buries Eo and is hanged too, but survives as his Uncle Narol drugs him to fake his death.

Narol delivers Darrow to the Sons of Ares, a rebel group aiming to overturn the Society's hierarchy. He is brought to a beautiful city on the planet's surface, revealing that Mars has actually been terraformed for centuries and the Reds underground are being lied to about the planet's true condition to guarantee their complacency. The group's leader Dancer reveals he wants Darrow to infiltrate the Society as a Gold. Darrow is physically transformed into a Gold via a black market "carving", physically trained, and taught Gold customs.

Under the fabricated Gold identity of "Darrow au Andromedus", he excels in testing and is accepted into Mars's "Institute" where the most elite Golds are trained. He is drafted into House Mars, one of 12 school Houses, where he befriends high-class Cassius. The Institute begins with the Passage where students are paired off and forced to fight to the death barehanded. Darrow kills Cassius's brother, Julian.

In a massive recreated medieval region in the Valles Marineris, each House is assigned a castle and told their objective is to conquer the other Houses, watched from afar by "Proctors." Each House's standard can be used to "enslave" other Houses' students, who must then obey their commands. House Mars fractures into factions, and one led by the bloodthirsty Titus rapes enslaved peers. Darrow manipulates House Minerva, led by the beautiful and cunning "Mustang" (Virginia), into defeating Titus's faction, leaving himself as house leader. Darrow interrogates captive Titus and realizes he is also a transformed Red. To maintain his cover, Darrow sentences Titus to death. Cassius duels and kills Titus. Since Darrow wields a scythe, he is nicknamed "Reaper".

House Mars hears rumors that House Pluto is led by "the Jackal," Nero Augustus's ruthless son Adrius. By playing them against each other, Darrow outwits and enslaves House Minerva and House Diana but, rather than letting his housemates kill her, chooses to let Mustang escape. The Jackal sends Cassius a video revealing Darrow killed Julian. An enraged Cassius duels Darrow, stabbing and leaving him for dead, usurping control of House Mars. Mustang rescues Darrow and hides him in a forest cave. As he recovers, they develop romantic feelings. Fitchner, House Mars's Proctor, reveals that Nero Augustus is bribing the Proctors to ensure The Jackal wins.

Darrow and Mustang amass an army by freeing slaves using House Minerva's standard, earning their immense loyalty. With his army, Darrow conquers Houses Ceres and Apollo. Darrow traps The Jackal, who amputates his own hand to free himself. The Proctors help The Jackal counterattack and escape. In retaliation, the Proctors kidnap Mustang. Enraged, Darrow slays Proctor Apollo.

With the Proctors' anti-gravity boots, Darrow's army storms the Proctors' base "Olympus", freeing Mustang and capturing the Proctors. Darrow confronts Cassius, who abdicates House Mars but declares a blood feud. Learning from Fitchner that Mustang is in truth The Jackal's twin sister, Darrow fears her betrayal, but Mustang instead dutifully delivers The Jackal and, with House Mars having conquered all others, Darrow wins the Institute's title.

Nero Augustus proposes to help Darrow join the fleet-commanding Academy and rise to power if Darrow hides Nero's game-rigging and becomes his Lancer (aide-de-camp). Despite his hatred of the man for having killed Eo, Darrow agrees, publicly joining House Augustus.

== Characters ==
- Darrow, a Red who is remade into a Gold named "Darrow au Andromedus" to infiltrate and destroy the Society. He is later called "The Reaper" by his classmates, for the sickle-shaped blade he carries as his weapon.
- Eo, Darrow's wife whose hanging for treason ignites his desire for revenge against the Golds.
- Nero au Augustus, the ArchGovernor of Mars who orders Eo's execution.
- Virginia au Augustus, daughter of the ArchGovernor and leader of House Minerva at the Institute. Initially not knowing her given name, Darrow calls her "Mustang".
- Adrius au Augustus, Virginia's vicious twin brother, leader of House Pluto at the Institute. His cruel and violent tactics of conquest earn him the nickname "The Jackal".
- Cassius au Bellona, Darrow's friend and ally in House Mars before he discovers that Darrow killed his brother.
- Roque au Fabii, Darrow's friend and ally in House Mars, a self-styled poet.
- Sevro au Barca, Darrow's friend and ally in House Mars, a lowDraft with an antisocial attitude.
- Antonia au Severus-Julii, a ruthless Gold whom Darrow alienates almost immediately.
- Titus au Ladros, a violent and tyrannical member of House Mars.
- Pax au Telemanus, a massive warrior aligned with Virginia in House Minerva.
- Tactus au Rath, a duplicitous member of House Diana.
- Fitchner au Barca, Proctor of Mars at the Institute, Sevro's father.
- Narol, Darrow's paternal uncle, rescues Darrow after his execution and sends him to the Sons of Ares.
- Dancer, Darrow's mentor in the Sons of Ares who first reveals to him the lies of the Golds, and taught him along with Matteo.
- Harmony, Dancer's half-disfigured, female partner.
- Mickey, a Violet Carver who remakes Darrow's body and physically transforms him into a Gold.
- Matteo, a Pink who educates Darrow about the society, its history, politics, and arts.
- Octavia au Lune, the Sovereign of the Society, residing on the Moon.
- Evey, a winged-Pink who nurses and cares for Darrow during The Carving.

== Development ==
Brown said of writing Red Rising, "I started with the main character [Darrow] and shaped my world around him. I was inspired by the plight of Irish immigrants in the 19th century and by the disenfranchisement of working classes." Brown also explained:

Pax's death was capricious and bothered me. I needed the Jackal to demonstrate his nature in Book 1 so I put all the names in the hat except Darrow and Mustang. When I pulled out Pax's name I stood there thinking, "I could just put it back in, no-one would ever know." I had a huge story arc planned with Darrow being with the Telemanuses against the Bellonas and that changed everything. But it was better, ultimately, that Darrow didn't have that shelter to hide behind.

== Reception ==
Red Rising was well received by both readers and critics, and hit #20 on the New York Times Best Seller list in February 2014.

Marc Snetiker of Entertainment Weekly gave the book an A−, writing, "Brown writes with cinematic grandeur, cleverly fusing Roman mythology with science fiction and pacing his action scenes for a slow-burn build to a hold-your-breath final act." Brian Truitt of USA Today gave the book 3.5 out of 4 stars, proclaiming, "Red Rising ascends above a crowded dystopian field." Writing for The Huffington Post, Britt Michaelian explained, "The morals and values that are explored through the characters in Red Rising have the potential to inspire a generation of readers to think intelligently about the impact of their decisions on themselves, their family and friends and on their world as a whole. This book is truly a powerful lesson in leadership." Niall Alexander wrote for Tor.com:

On the surface, Red Rising resembles any number of other genre novels of note, but dig a little deeper ... to reveal real uniqueness: in Brown’s nearly seamless assemblage of several time-tested traditions, if not in a great many of his debut’s myriad threads independently ... Its final act ... is like a heart attack: a no-holds-barred bastard of a finale in which the author gathers a spread of elements together in much the same way George R. R. Martin’s does in the best and most brutal bits of his bestselling saga ... For once I would have loved more in the way of worldbuilding, and Brown could have made the most of a longer novel by exploring a few of his fiction’s most interesting figures further, but it bears remembering that Red Rising is only the beginning of a trilogy—which is to say there’s space and time for this impressive young author to work out its biggest kinks.

Kirkus Reviews described the novel as "reminiscent of The Hunger Games and Game of Thrones", calling it "a fine novel for those who like to immerse themselves in alternative worlds". However, Publishers Weekly said of the novel, "Pierce offers a Hollywood-ready story with plenty of action and thrills but painfully little originality or plausibility."

Brown's Red Rising fans have dubbed themselves "Howlers" after characters in the novels, and the author has also noted the popularity of his novels among queer readers, saying "One of my favourite things about this tour has been seeing how popular these books have been with the lesbian, gay and transgender community. It's amazing that they have found a home in these books. One reader almost made me cry. He's transgender and identifies as male and he told me that he found a home in Sevro and feels like Sevro was the friend he never had."

== Prequel comic ==
A six-issue prequel comic book series exploring the origins of the rebel group "Sons of Ares" called Red Rising: Sons of Ares was published by Dynamite Entertainment in 2017. The series was continued with six more issues published in 2020.

== Adaptations ==
=== Audiobooks ===
An audiobook of Red Rising, the first book in the series, was released on January 28, 2014, by Recorded Books. GraphicAudio produced an audiobook of book one in two parts that include full cast, cinematic music and sound effects. Part one was released on March 22, 2023, and part two was released on May 15.

=== Other media ===
In February 2021, Stonemaier Games announced their Red Rising board game. The game got a Recommendation by the International Gamers Awards 2021.

In 2014, Universal Pictures secured the rights for a film adaptation, but the project was eventually scrapped. Brown began developing Red Rising as a television series in 2018, and insinuated that the potential series had one of the major streaming services interested in adapting the series in 2021. In March 2026, Brown acknowledged that the project was no longer moving forward. In October 2026, Paramount Pictures picked up the film rights and assigned Francis Lawrence to direct.
