= D. J. Waldie =

American writer

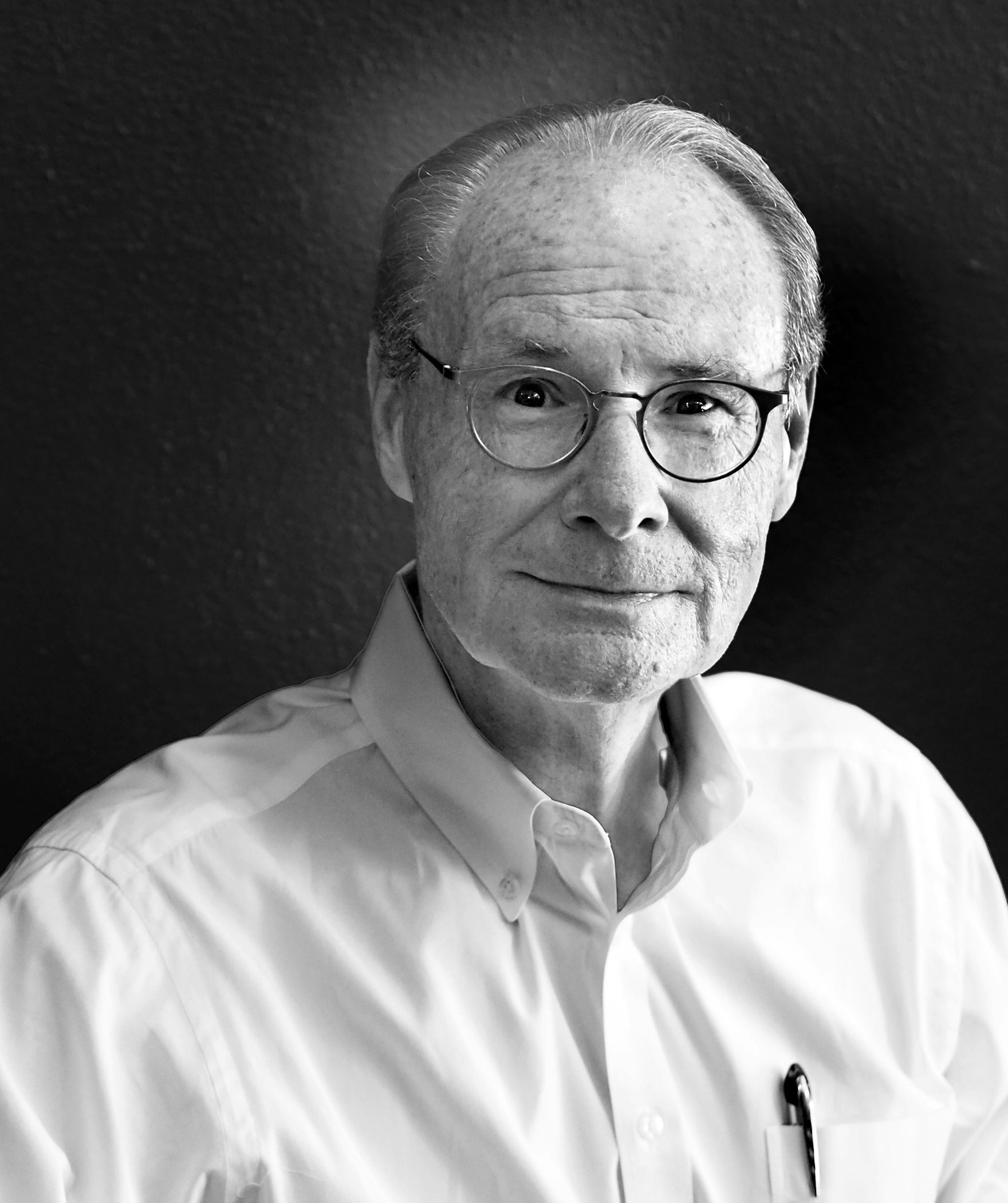
- D. J. Waldie in 2017
- Born: September 15, 1948 (age 78); Lakewood, California, U.S.
- Education: California State University, Long Beach; University of California, Irvine
- Occupations: Writer, translator, city administrator (ret.)
- Writing career
- Notable works: Holy Land: A Suburban Memoir; Where We Are Now; California Romantica; House; Becoming Los Angeles
- Website: www.djwaldie.com

D. J. Waldie (Donald J. Waldie) is an American essayist, memoirist, translator, and editor who also is the former Deputy City Manager of Lakewood, California.

Although best known for Holy Land: A Suburban Memoir (1996 and 2005, W. W. Norton), Waldie also is regarded as a thoughtful observer of Los Angeles' history, politics, and culture. "Nobody 'sees' L.A. with more eloquence than D. J. Waldie," noted Susan Brenneman, Los Angeles Times deputy op-ed editor, in May 2014. And "Waldie ... is one of the writers responsible for developing a Southern California aesthetic in which what's most vivid about the place is everything we might take for granted somewhere else," said David Ulin, book critic of the Los Angeles Times in April 2014.

== Holy Land: A Suburban Memoir ==
Waldie's Holy Land: A Suburban Memoir (1996 and 2005, W. W. Norton) is his account of growing up in the 1950s in Lakewood, then California's largest planned suburb. Lakewood was the first of its kind on the west coast and is regarded as a parallel to Levittown, New York, the original, post-World War II, tract-house development in America.

Waldie breaks the text into 316 sections, some no longer than a sentence or two. Some deal with the author's experiences, both in first and third person narration. These memories concentrate on his Catholic upbringing and the deaths of his parents. The majority of the sections detail the historical, geographical, political, and cultural factors both preceding the development of Lakewood's 17,000 homes and following Lakewood's incorporation as a city in 1954. Waldie focuses particularly on the three developers who built Lakewood in the early 1950s, devoting long passages to the intricacies of the development process. Other passages consider how suburban places have been viewed by their critics, with particular reference to the aerial photographs of William A. Garnett. Holy Land: A Suburban Memoir ultimately becomes a memoir of both a person and a place.

Jade Chang, author of The Wangs vs. the World, said of Holy Land in 2016, "Waldie's meditation on suburbia finds the beauty in wonky detail and weaves a wholly unconventional narrative. I'd put this book up against the best of Baudrillard and Banham."

== Critical reception of Holy Land ==
Holy Land received generally positive reviews on its publication in 1996, although some critics were unimpressed by Waldie's fragmentary style and his appreciation of suburban lives.

Novelist and memoirist Joan Didion described Holy Land as "Infinitely moving and powerful, just dead-on right, and absolutely original." Dr. Kevin Starr, historian and author of the series Americans and the California Dream said, "I have read hundreds, perhaps a thousand or more, memoirs of California. Holy Land ranks with the best of them. With spare fact, Waldie has managed to present the rise of suburban Southern California in its full complexity."

In her review in The New York Times in July 1996, Michiko Kakutani concluded, "Moving back and forth effortlessly between the personal and the communal, between memories of his own childhood and statistics combed from public records, (Waldie) creates a moving portrait of his hometown, and in doing so he manages to give this faceless suburb, long held up as an archetype of suburban anonymity, a local habitation and a name."

"Holy Land captivated me when it first came out. It still astonishes. It's no easier to describe now than it was before it became a classic of American autobiography. Waldie's range is staggering – from intimate, touchingly respectful revelations of family life and spiritual reality to a precise history of land development and public policy regarding water use (and don't imagine this is the boring part). Waldie has written nothing less than the spiritual autobiography of the midcentury American suburban dream. It proves to be a subject worthy of tragedy and of his remarkable elegy," wrote Patricia Hampl, novelist, memoirist, and poet in 2008 in Commonweal.

Essayist and music writer Joe Bonomo, writing in the Rose Metal Press Field Guide to Prose Poetry, described Holy Land in 2010 as "a lyric map -- if such a thing can be said to exist. Waldie's worked in a civic position in L.A. for decades, and his sometimes-fragmentary memories of growing up in mid-century suburban Los Angeles dovetail with accurate and clinical reportage of the area's tract history in 316 poetically arranged segments that suggest nothing less than an aerial view of a suburban neighborhood captured in reverie."

Holy Land was called one of the 25 most significant books on Southern California architecture and urbanism by Christopher Hawthorne, architecture critic of the Los Angeles Times, in 2012.

"If Thomas Pynchon and Don DeLillo had collaborated on a study of an archetypal American postwar suburb, the result would be D. J. Waldie's visionary history and memoir of Lakewood, California," said Robert Fishman, professor of Architecture and Urban Planning, University of Michigan, in 2013.

Novelist and essayist Geoff Dyer, interviewed by The New York Times Book Review in 2016, was more critical. "(A) number of people recommended D. J. Waldie's Holy Land: A Suburban Memoir, he said, "but I found it so flat and dull."

In 2018, James Mustich, Jr. included Holy Land in his compendium 1,000 Books to Read Before You Die, noting "Although it's labeled as such, to call (Holy Land) a memoir does not quite do justice to the magic it works, invoking the numinous in the anonymous through an almost sacramental act of attention."

More recently, Eula Biss, writing in The Guardian, said of Holy Land, "This work invites the reader to consider how our lives are shaped by the structures we live within, and to wonder what it might mean to live a 'good life', in both material and spiritual terms."

== Scholarly appraisal ==
"The aesthetic appeal of D. J. Waldie's Holy Land: A Suburban Memoir may be attributed to the many surprises its hybrid form delivers. What sets off this little book from so many other narratives about the American post-war history of suburbanization is the complexity of its literary shape. … Holy Land presents a series of fragmented observations formally modeled upon the grid pattern that structures the author's built environment. Roaming across this grid is a walking participant observer: the narrator, who decentres the Cartesian eye of the cartographer. This laconic narrator plays around in a metonymical manner with an endlessly extendable chain of links, disturbing all attempts at reducing and synthesizing his suburban narrative. In the end, however, neither the act of gridding the text nor the insertion of a walking perspective lend themselves to straightforward allegorical interpretations. We are left with an unpredictable stage for the circulation and mutual transformation of information and affect, which in the final analysis appears to be a textual enactment of the workings of desire." (Bart Eeckhout and Lesley Janssen. "Making the Visible a Little Hard to See: D. J. Waldie's Aesthetic Challenge to American Urban Studies in Holy Land," Anglia: Journal of English Philology, Volume 132, Issue 1, April 2014, 78-97)

"Waldie challenges representations of suburbia as a type of region unworthy of serious, close attention, proving that regionalist study can be critical too, interrogating the local and proximate precisely in order to demonstrate its universality, its connectedness and its differences with the wider world." (Neil Campbell. "Affective Critical Regionalism in D. J. Waldie's Suburban West," Beyond the Myth: New Perspectives on Western Texts, editors D. Rio, A. Ibarraran, and M. Simonson, Vitoria-Gasteiz, Spain: Portal Education, 2011, 87-106)

== Life ==
D. J. Waldie lives in Lakewood, California in the house his parents bought in 1946. He was born in 1948. He attended California State University, Long Beach (then a California state college) and the University of California, Irvine, where he was a Regents Intern Fellow in Comparative Literature.

In the mid-1970s, he taught at California State University, Long Beach in the Department of Comparative Literature and the University Honors Program.

Waldie began his career in public administration in Lakewood in December 1977. He served as the city's Public Information Officer between 1981 and 2010. He retired as Deputy City Manager of Lakewood in September 2010.

He has written for the Los Angeles Times, where he is a contributing editor. He is a contributing editor for the Los Angeles Review of Books.

His work as a translator of the 19th century French symbolist poet Stéphane Mallarmé was included in exhibitions at the Beinecke Rare Book and Manuscript Library at Yale University, the Langson Library at the University of California Irvine, the Clark Humanities Museum at Scripps College and at the Mallarmé centenary symposium held at the City University of New York.

His translation of Mallarmé's Un coup de dés/A Throw of the Dice is in the collections of the Bibliothèque Littéraire Jacques Doucet, Paris, the J. Paul Getty Museum, the Museum of Modern Art, and the Victoria and Albert Museum, as well as the special collections of the Princeton, Brown, UCLA, USC, Yale, and Harvard libraries. This translation was reprinted, along with a brief analysis of the poem, in Parnassus: Poetry in Review in 2005.

In 2004, his essay collection Where We Are Now: Notes from Los Angeles was named one of the best books of the year by the Los Angeles Times Book Review. The anthology Home Ground: Language for an American Landscape (to which he contributed) was named one of the best non-fiction books of 2006 by National Public Radio, the San Francisco Chronicle, and The Kansas City Star. California Romantica (for which he wrote the descriptive text) became a Los Angeles Times bestseller in 2007. Blue Sky Metropolis : The Aerospace Century in Southern California (to which he contributed) was named one of the best non-fiction books of 2012 by the Los Angeles Public Library.

He was a member of the delegation of Los Angeles writers and filmmakers invited by the National Endowment for the Arts to participate in the Guadalajara International Book Festival in 2009.

In 2010, his memoir of growing up in suburban Los Angeles County in the 1950s was optioned by James Franco for a film project, released in 2015 as Suburban Memoir.

Formerly Lakewood's public information officer, he retired in 2010 with the title of deputy city manager.

== Awards ==
- 2017 William R. and June Dale Prize for Urban and Regional Planning, an endowed award administered by California State Polytechnic University, Pomona through the university's Department of Urban and Regional Planning. USC Professor Dowell Myers was the co-recipient of the 2017 Dale Prize.
- 2014 J. Thomas Owen History Award, Los Angeles City Historical Society
- 1998 Whiting Award, Whiting Foundation
- 1995 National Endowment for the Arts fellowship
- 1994 California Arts Council fellowship

== Works ==
=== Books ===
- Holy Land: A Suburban Memoir. New York: W. W. Norton & Company. 1995. ISBN 978-0-393-32728-1.
- Real City: Downtown Los Angeles Inside/Out. Photographer Marissa Roth. Santa Monica: Angel City Press. 2002. ISBN 978-1-883318-07-9.
- Where We Are Now: Notes from Los Angeles. Santa Monica: Angel City Press. 2004. ISBN 978-1-883318-38-3.
- California Romantica. Produced by Diane Keaton; photographers Lisa Hardaway, Paul Hester. New York: Rizzoli. 2008. ISBN 978-0847829750.
- Holy Land: Ricordi Suburbani. Traduzione di Holy Land: A Suburban Memoir di Annamaria Biavasco e Valentina Guani. Genova: Il Canneto Editore. 2011. ISBN 978-8896430231. Archived from the original on 2020-07-21.
- House. Produced by Diane Keaton; photographers Lisa Hardaway, Paul Hester, and Paul Warchol. New York: Rizzoli. 2012. ISBN 978-0847835638.
- The Lakewood Story: History, Traditions, Values. Lakewood, CA: City of Lakewood. 2013.
- No Circus. Photographer Randi Malkin Steinberger. Balogna: Damiani Editore. 2016. ISBN 978-8862084802.
- LA River. Photographer Michael Kolster. Staunton, Virginia: George F. Thompson Publishing. 2019. ISBN 9781938086649.
- Becoming Los Angeles: Myth, Memory, and a Sense of Place. Santa Monica: Angel City Press. 2020. ISBN 978-1-62640-079-5.

=== Audiobooks ===
- Becoming Los Angeles: Myth, Memory, and a Sense of Place. New York: Random House Audio. 2021. ISBN 9780593458679.
- Holy Land: A Suburban Memoir. Old Saybrook, Connecticut: Tantor Media. 2021. ISBN 9798200770946.

=== Collections ===
- What is Los Angeles? in Cities: Architecture and Society; 10 Mostra Internazionale di Architettura, Biennale de Venezia, Richard Burdett and Sarah Ichioka, eds., New York: Rizzoli, 2006. ISBN 978-0847828791
- Beautiful and Terrible: Los Angeles and the Image of Suburbia in Seeing Los Angeles: A Different Look at a Different City, Guy Bennett and Beatrice Mousli, eds., Los Angeles: Otis Books/Seismicity Editions, 2007 ISBN 978-0975592496
- Drawing on Water in Los Angeles in An Atlas of Radical Cartography, Alexis Bhagat and Lize Mogel, eds., Los Angeles: Journal of Aesthetics and Protest Press, 2007 ISBN 978-0979137723
- My Place in California in The People and Promise of California, Mona Field and Brian Kennedy, eds., London: Pearson, 2007 ISBN 978-0321434890
- Public Policy/Private Lives in Tell Me True: Memoir, History, and Writing a Life, Patricia Hampl and Elaine Tyler May, eds., Minneapolis: Borealis Books/Minnesota Historical Society, 2008 ISBN 978-0873518154
- City of Angels. City of Faith? in Los Angeles: Eine Stadt im Film/A City on Film – Eine Retrospektive der Viennale und des Österreichischen Filmmuseums, 5. Oktober bis 5. November 2008, Astrid Ofner and Claudia Siefen, eds., Marburg: Schüren Verlag GmbH, 2008 ISBN 978-3-89472-662-1
- Rereading, Misreading, and Redeeming the Golden State: Defining California Through History in A Companion to California History, William Deverell and Greg Hise, eds., Chichester: Wiley-Blackwell, 2008 ISBN 978-1405161831
- The House of God and the Gate of Heaven: From the Old Plaza Church to the Cathedral on the Hill in The Devil's Punchbowl: A Cultural and Geographic Map of California Today, Kate Gale and Veronique de Turenne, eds., Los Angeles: Red Hen Press, 2010 ISBN 978-1597091640
- Where We Are in New California Writing 2011, Gayle Wattawa, ed., Berkeley: Heyday Books, 2011 ISBN 978-1597141567
- Lost in Aerospace in Blue Sky Metropolis: The Aerospace Century in Southern California, Peter Westwick, ed., Berkeley and Los Angeles: Huntington Library and University of California Press, 2012 ISBN 978-0873282499
- A New Suburban Beauty: Maynard L. Parker and Dreams of Postwar America, in Maynard L. Parker: Modern Photography and the American Dream, Jenny Watts, ed., New Haven: Yale University Press, 2012 ISBN 978-0300171150
- Union Station: Time and Again in Union Station: 75 Years in the Heart of LA, Linda Theung, ed., Los Angeles: Metropolitan Transportation Authority, 2014 ASIN B0732TG39T
- Suburban Holy Land in Infinite Suburbia, Alan Berger and Joel Kotkin, eds., Hudson, New York: Princeton Architectural Press, 2017 ISBN 978-1616895501
- Lakewood, CA in New California Writing 2011, Gayle Wattawa ed., Berkeley: Heyday Books, 2011 ISBN 9781597141567
- Language in the Landscape: The Emancipated Word in Readymades: American Roadside Artifacts, Jeffrey T Brouws, ed., San Francisco: Chronicle Books, 2003 ISBN 0811836770
- An Ordinary Place in My California: Journeys by Great Writers, Donna Wares, ed., Santa Monica: Angel City Press, 2007 ISBN 978-1883318437
- Acre, Camelback, Colina, etc. in Home ground: Language for an American Landscape, Barry Lopez, ed., San Antonio: Trinity University Press, 2010 ISBN 9781595340573
- It’s Immaterial Where You Are in Common Place: The American Motel, Bruce Bégout, Colin Keaveney, D. J. Waldie, Los Angeles: Otis Books/Seismicity Editions, 2010 ISBN 9780979617782

=== Exhibition catalogs ===
- "Facing the Facts". Close to Home: An American Album. Los Angeles: J. Paul Getty Museum. 2004. ISBN 978-0-89236-771-9.
- "Ruscha, L.A., and a Sense of Place in the West: 'It can go any way it wants, and I'll still be here.'". Ed Ruscha and the Great American West (1st ed.). San Francisco, Oakland: Fine Arts Museums of San Francisco, University of California Press. 2016. p. 25. ISBN 978-0-520-29069-3. LCCN 2016009264. OL 27212240M. Wikidata Q114683868.
- "Homeward Bound". Karla Klarin: Subdividing the Landscape. Northridge: CSU Northridge Galleries. 2016.
- "Suburban Landscape". Jona Frank: Model Home. Brunswick, Maine: Bowdoin College Museum of Art. 2022.

=== Translation ===
- Stéphane Mallarmé. Poem: A throw of the dice will never abolish chance. Translated by D. J. Waldie. Illustrations by Gary Young. Santa Cruz: Greenhouse Review Press. 1990. OCLC 27862439. (Reprinted with an introductory essay by the translator in Parnassus: Poetry in Review. 2001; included in The Lost Origins of the Essay. John D'Agata, ed. Graywolf Press. 2008 ISBN 978-1555975326)
- Translations by Jeanne Bornstein and D. J. Waldie of the Flemish poet Paul van Ostaijen are held in the E. M. Beekman collection of the Howard Gotlieb Archival Research Center at Boston University.

=== Poetry ===
- Sympathy: 5 poems. Santa Cruz: Greenhouse Review Press. 1977.
- The grain is unlocked. The grain unravels. Santa Cruz: Greenhouse Review Press. 1977.

=== Screenplay ===
- Holy Land. Rabbit Bandini Productions. 2012.

=== Excerpts from Holy Land ===
- L.A. Now: Volume One, Richard Koshalek, ed., Los Angeles: Art Center College of Design, 2002 ISBN 978-0961870560
- Writing Los Angeles: A Literary Anthology, David L. Ulin, ed., New York: Library of America, 2002 ISBN 978-1-931082-27-3
- California Uncovered: Stories for the 21st Century, Chitra Banerjee Divakaruni et al, eds., Berkeley: Heyday Books/California Council for the Humanities, 2004 ISBN 978-1890771973
- The Suburb Reader, Becky Nicolaides and Andrew Wiese, eds., Routledge, 2006 ISBN 978-1138818583
- Where We Live Now: An Annotated Reader, Matthew Stadler, ed., Portland: Verse Chorus Press, 2008 ISBN 978-1891241499
- Los Angeles, Sebastian Raho, ed., Wieser Verlag, 2020 (German edition) ISBN 978-3990293218

== Film archival research ==
- The War from the Air, Nova/PBS, 1975
- Hitler's Secret Weapon, Nova/PBS, 1976
- Will Rogers: America in the '20s, Cadre Films/Will Rogers Foundation. 1977

== Exhibitions ==
- "Positively 4th Street: An Encounter with the 4th Street Viaduct", Huntley Gallery, California Polytechnic University Pomona, 2018 (consultant and co-contributor)
- "Overdrive: L.A. Constructs the Future, 1940-1990", 2013, J. Paul Getty Museum (consultant and contributor)
- "Form and Landscape: Southern California Edison and the Los Angeles Basin, 1940-1990", 2013, Huntington Library (guest curator)
- "Unbuilt Los Angeles", 2013, A+D Architecture and Design Museum (consultant)
- "A Windshield Perspective: The Framing of L.A. Architecture and Urbanism", 2013, A+D Architecture and Design Museum (consultant)
- "California Design, 1930-1965: Living in a Modern Way", 2012, Los Angeles County Museum of Art (guest lecturer)
- "A Throw of the Dice: Artists Inspired By a Visual Text", 2003, University of California Irvine (contributor)
- "Mallarmé at the Millennium", 1999, City University of New York (co-contributor)
