= Matched =

Matched may refer to:

- Matched (book), the first book in the Matched trilogy
- Matched (titled Matching in Japan), a Japanese film starring Tao Tsuchiya
- Matched filter, a filter used in signal processing
- Matched betting, a betting technique
- Matched trilogy, a dystopian fiction trilogy written by Ally Condie
