= Jon M. Chu =

American filmmaker (born 1979)

- 朱浩偉
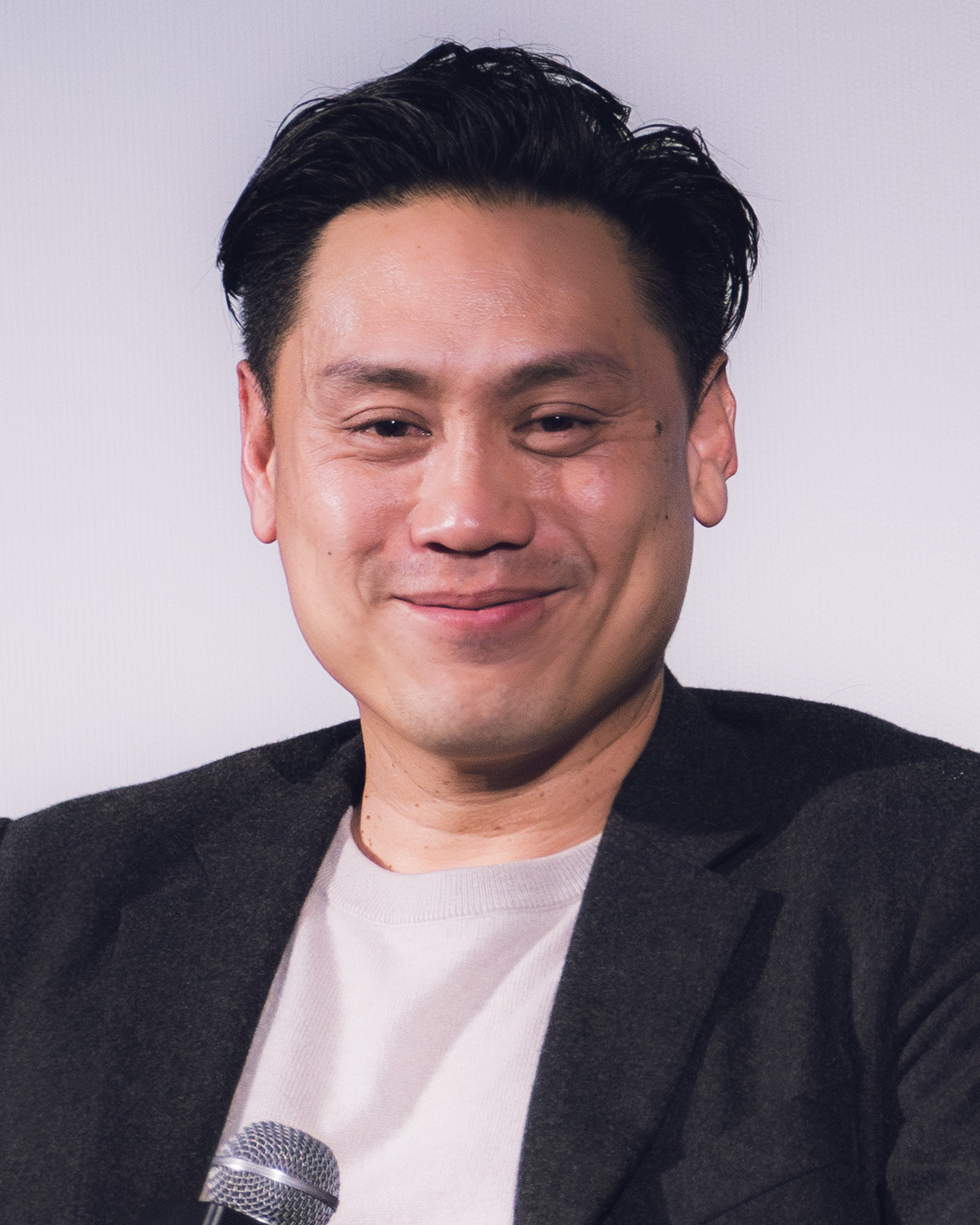
- Chu in 2025
- Born: Jonathan Murray Chu; November 2, 1979 (age 46); Palo Alto, California, U.S.
- Education: University of Southern California (BFA)
- Occupations: Film director; film producer; screenwriter
- Years active: 2001–present
- Spouse: Kristin Hodge (m. 2018)
- Children: 5

Jonathan Murray Chu (born November 2, 1979) is an American filmmaker. He is known for directing the romantic comedy Crazy Rich Asians (2018), one of the first films by a major Hollywood studio to feature a majority cast of Asian descent, and the fantasy musicals Wicked (2024) and Wicked: For Good (2025), a two-part film adaptation of the stage musical. For directing Wicked, Chu won the National Board of Review Award for Best Director and Critics' Choice Award for Best Director.

An alumnus of the USC School of Cinematic Arts, other films he has directed often include musical elements, including the dance films Step Up 2: The Streets (2008) and Step Up 3D (2010), the science fiction film G.I. Joe: Retaliation (2013), the musicals Jem and the Holograms (2015) and In the Heights (2021), as well as the live concert films Justin Bieber: Never Say Never (2011) and Justin Bieber's Believe (2013).

== Early life and education ==
Chu was born in Palo Alto, California, and grew up in nearby Los Altos. His mother, Ruth Chu, was born in Taiwan; his father, Lawrence Chu, was born in Sichuan, China. His family owns the restaurant Chef Chu's. He is the youngest of five children. He began making movies in fifth grade, when his mother gave him a video camera to document their family vacations. Chu instead began making home movies starring his siblings.

Chu attended Pinewood School from kindergarten through 12th grade. He obtained a Bachelor of Fine Arts in film and television production from the University of Southern California in 2003, where he was a member of the Sigma Phi Epsilon fraternity. He won the Princess Grace Award, the Kodak Student Filmmaker Award, the Dore Schary Award presented by the Anti-Defamation League, the Jack Nicholson directing award, and was recognized as an honoree for the IFP/West program Project: Involve. In 2006, he launched a YouTube channel showcasing his early work and behind-the-scenes vlogs.

== Career ==
After making his student short, When the Kids Are Away, Chu was signed to William Morris Agency and attached to several high-profile projects, including the modern-day Romeo and Juliet screenplay Moxie for Steven Spielberg at Amblin Entertainment. Chu was also hired by Sony Pictures to direct a contemporary, hip hop–inspired adaptation of the stage musical Bye Bye Birdie. However, Sony did not greenlight the film due to budget concerns. Sony re-hired Chu to direct their updated version of The Great Gatsby, which did not pan out as the project was purchased by Warner Bros. Pictures for their 2013 film.

Chu directed Step Up 2: The Streets in 2008. In 2010, he created, co-directed, and co-produced The Legion of Extraordinary Dancers a web series featuring various types of dance. Chu says LXD was inspired by Michael Jackson's "Thriller" and "Smooth Criminal" music videos and by the dancers he met while filming the movie Step Up 2: The Streets. In 2011, Chu directed Justin Bieber: Never Say Never an American 3-D concert film.

During this period Chu had a dance crew called AC/DC or Adam Chu/Dance Crew. In an interview, Chu addressed a question he is often asked, "Why do all of your films have dance?" He responded, "I don't know why. It seems so obvious. But there's something about the dancers that motivate me the most. I don't know if it's just dance, but I do think that the dancers are amazing artists, and every time I meet a new dancer, that triggers something in my brain, and I'm more creative than I could ever be. When I feel that creativity burst, I go with it."

In 2012, Deadline reported on Chu's negotiations to directing Masters of the Universe, a planned live action film based on the Mattel media franchise of the same name, for Sony and Escape Artists. Several months later, Chu affirmed his committal, specifically due to the strength of its screenplay which he described as a "fresh" and "unexpected" take on the property. As he was a fan of the He-Man toy line and cartoon series as a kid, Chu noted his personal attachment toward the brand.

In January 2013, Chu was negotiating to take over for David Slade as director of Disney's adaptation of futuristic YA novel Matched. In April, he received the Visionary Award by East West Players (EWP), the longest-running theater of color in the United States, for his contributions to the Asian Pacific American (APA) community. In an online Q&A, Chu revealed that he had attended EWP's productions as a child and was excited "to push boundaries with them in the future." While weighing the possibility of directing the sequel to his recently-released G.I. Joe: Retaliation, Chu indicated prioritization of Masters of the Universe as his next effort. Despite this, no subsequent movement occurred on Chu's version of the film; the reboot eventually saw release 13 years later, under director Travis Knight.

In 2013, Chu directed a pre-flight safety video for Virgin America. The video was structured like a musical number that incorporated multiple styles and high-energy dance. The video was played before flights through 2018, when Virgin America was folded into Alaska Airlines.

In June 2014, Deadline reported that Fox was preparing a limited series based on the 2012 Korean show Answer Me 1997, entitled Answer Me 1999, and Chu set to helm the opening episode scripted by his Step Up 3D writers Amy Andelson and Emily Meyer. Like the original, it was envisioned as a musical coming-of-age drama about a group of high school friends that shifts back-and-forth to their present lives as adults.

In November 2014, Chu and his producing partner Hieu Ho sold to Focus Features a planned 1990s-set high school dance comedy called Can't Touch This. He was also said to be developing two projects for Lionsgate at that time; the horror project Run, and the magician sequel Now You See Me 2, the latter releasing in 2016. Chu was initially set to return as director for the third film in the franchise, but Ruben Fleischer took on the position instead.

Chu next directed Crazy Rich Asians for Warners. It was the highest-grossing film over the August 17, 2018 weekend, earned over $35M at the US box office during its first five days, and received a 93% rating from Rotten Tomatoes. Within a week of the film's release, Variety reported that a sequel was already in development by Warner Bros. with Chu scheduled to direct. Director Chu is part of Rachel Chu's family in the book, as a distant cousin.

In 2018, Hulu was developing a television series adaptation of The Wangs vs. the World, with author Jade Chang adapting and Chu directing should the script move to pilot. By the end of that same year, Warners planned to re-team with Chu to chronicle the career of Journey singer Arnel Pineda, with Chu directing and producing the film with Marty Bowen through Temple Hill Entertainment. In November 2019, another series adaptation, based on the YA horror fiction series Point Horror, was reportedly in development at HBO with Chu in talks to direct and executive produce. The following month, Chu was said to be producing, and in talks to direct, a feature adaptation of Mary H. K. Choi's bestselling YA romance novel Permanent Record, also for Warner Bros.

Chu directed In the Heights, based on the Broadway musical of the same name, for Warner Bros. Pictures. It was previously set for a June 26, 2020, release, though it was delayed due to the COVID-19 pandemic. The film was released on June 10, 2021.

In February 2020, Chu was set to direct and executive produce Erica Messer and David Cornue's medical drama series Triage, for ABC. In October, it was announced that Chu would be directing the pilot for the Disney+ series Willow, based on the film of the same name, with Warwick Davis returning as the title character. The following month, Chu entered talks with Disney to direct a live-action adaptation of Lilo & Stitch, which he ultimately passed on due to other obligations. It was also announced, in December, that he was developing a series remake of Swiss Family Robinson at Disney+.

In January 2021, Chu left directorial duties on Willow due to production delays and personal reasons with the birth of his next child. The following month, it was announced that Chu would direct the two-part film adaptation of Wicked for Universal Pictures, with both parts set for November 2024 and 2025 releases.

In January 2024, Chu along with his production company Electric Company, signed a first look film deal with Warner Bros. Pictures, where he'll direct both original and franchise films for the studio.

=== Upcoming projects ===
Chu will direct an adaptation of Dr. Seuss's Oh, The Places You'll Go!, produced by Warner Bros. Pictures Animation alongside Dr. Seuss Enterprises and Bad Robot Productions.

In February 2021, it was reported that Chu's next film would be The Great Chinese Art Heist, based on a GQ article by Alex W. Palmer. The film would explore a series of museum robberies in Europe where Chinese antiquities were stolen. In August, Jimmy O. Yang, Jessica Gao and Ken Cheng were tapped to write the adaptation for Chu to direct.

In March 2022, it was announced that Chu would be producing (and possibly directing) an animated film based on the children's modeling compound Play-Doh. It will be produced by Entertainment One and Hasbro.

In April 2023, it was revealed that Chu will direct and co-produce a feature film adaptation of Andrew Lloyd Webber and Tim Rice's musical Joseph and the Amazing Technicolor Dreamcoat, a passion project he had been hoping to make for some time, for Amazon MGM Studios and the Really Useful Group. It will be produced by Scott Sanders and Mara Jacobs, reuniting with Chu after working with him on In the Heights.

In August 2024, it was announced that Chu will direct the film adaptation of Britney Spears' memoir The Woman in Me for Universal, re-teaming with Wicked producer Marc Platt on the project.

In April 2025, Chu became attached to direct the live action adaptation of the video game Split Fiction, with Rhett Reese and Paul Wernick writing the screenplay, Story Kitchen producing, and Sydney Sweeney cast in the lead role.

In July 2025, it was announced that the live-action Hot Wheels movie in development at Mattel and Warner Bros. would be moving forward with Chu set to direct, and Juel Taylor and Tony Rettenmaier writing the script.

In 2026, Jeff Sneider reported that Chu was in the mix—alongside Joachim Rønning and directing duo Adil El Arbi and Bilall Fallah—to take the helm of the third installment in the Top Gun franchise.

== Filmmaking style and influences ==
Chu is recognized for his high-energy visual style, often blending traditional cinematic techniques with modern digital aesthetics. His work frequently features vibrant color palettes and intricately choreographed camera movements that reflect his background in dance and musical theater. Critics have noted that his films, such as In the Heights and Crazy Rich Asians, often explore themes of cultural identity, family legacy, and the tension between tradition and modernity.

He has cited a variety of sources as influences on his filmmaking, including the work of Steven Spielberg and John Hughes, as well as Asian-American filmmakers such as Destin Daniel Cretton, Alice Wu, and Justin Lin. Chu has particularly mentioned Spielberg's E.T. the Extra-Terrestrial (1982) and classic musicals like Singin' in the Rain (1952) and The Sound of Music (1965) as foundational to his directing style.

== Personal life ==
Chu married graphic designer Kristin Hodge on July 27, 2018, in St. Helena, California. Their daughter, Willow, was born in 2017; she is named after the 1988 fantasy film Willow. Their son, Jonathan Heights, was born in 2019. His middle name comes from the film, In the Heights, which Chu was in the middle of directing at the time. Their other children are daughter Ruby, son Iggy, and daughter Stevie Sky.

== Filmography ==
=== Short film ===
Year	Title	Director	Producer	Cinematographer	Writer	Notes
2001	Silent Beats	Yes	Yes	No	Yes	Also sound and production designer
2002	When the Kids Are Away	Yes	Yes	No	Yes	
2002	Gwai Lo: The Little Foreigner	Yes	No	No	No	
2002	Killing Babies	No	No	Yes	No	
2018	Somewhere	No	No	Yes	No	

=== Feature film ===
Year	Title	Director	Producer	Notes
2008	Step Up 2: The Streets	Yes	No	
2010	Step Up 3D	Yes	No	
2011	Justin Bieber: Never Say Never	Yes	Executive	Documentary
2012	Step Up Revolution	No	Executive	
2013	G.I. Joe: Retaliation	Yes	No	
2013	Justin Bieber's Believe	Yes	No	Documentary
2014	Step Up: All In	No	Executive	
2015	Jem and the Holograms	Yes	Yes	
2016	Now You See Me 2	Yes	No	
2016	Dance Camp	No	Yes	
2018	Crazy Rich Asians	Yes	No	
2019	Step Up: Year of the Dance	No	Yes	
2021	In the Heights	Yes	No	
2024	Wicked	Yes	No	
2025	Wicked: For Good	Yes	No	
2028	Oh, the Places You'll Go!	Yes	No	Animated film

=== Television ===
Year	Title	Director	Executive Producer	Writer	Notes
2010–2011	The Legion of Extraordinary Dancers	Yes	Yes	Yes	Creator, Also editor
2019	Ken Jeong: You Complete Me, Ho	Yes	Yes	No	TV special
2019–2024	Good Trouble	Yes	Yes	No	Pilot
2020–2021	Home Before Dark	Yes	Yes	No	
2022	Thai Cave Rescue	No	Yes	No	
2022	Beauty and the Beast: A 30th Celebration	No	Yes	No	TV special
2023	The Company You Keep	No	Yes	No	

== Accolades ==
Association	Date of ceremony	Category	Nominated work	Result	Ref.
Directors Guild of America Student Awards	November 12, 2002	Best Asian American Student Filmmaker - West Coast	Gwai Lo: The Little Foreigner	Won	
Cinema Eye Honors	January 11, 2012	Audience Choice Prize	Justin Bieber: Never Say Never	Nominated	
Chicago Independent Film Critics Circle Awards	February 2, 2019	Impact Award	Crazy Rich Asians	Nominated	
Hollywood Critics Association Midseason Awards	July 1, 2021	Best Filmmaker	In the Heights	Nominated	
National Board of Review	December 4, 2024	Best Director	Wicked	Won	
The Astra Awards	December 8, 2024	Best Director	Wicked	Won	
Washington D.C. Area Film Critics Association	December 8, 2024	Best Director	Wicked	Nominated	
Michigan Movie Critics Guild	December 9, 2024	Best Director	Wicked	Nominated	
Las Vegas Film Critics Society	December 13, 2024	Best Director	Wicked	Nominated	
New York Film Critics Online	December 16, 2024	Best Director	Wicked	Nominated	
TiBS Editors Choice Awards	December 30, 2024	Best Director	Wicked	Won	
Critics Association Of Central Florida	January 2, 2025	Best Director	Wicked	Runner-up	
Houston Film Critics Society	January 14, 2025	Best Director	Wicked	Nominated	
Critics' Choice Movie Awards	February 7, 2025	Best Director	Wicked	Won	
Online Film & Television Association	February 23, 2025	Best Director	Wicked	Nominated	
American Cinema Editors	March 14, 2025	Golden Eddie Filmmaker of the Year	—N/a	Won	
Motion Picture Association Awards	September 8, 2025	Creator Award	—N/a	Won	
Savannah Film Festival	October 26, 2025	Vanguard Director Award	Wicked: For Good	Won	

== Bibliography ==
- Chu, Jon M.; McCarter, Jeremy (2024). Viewfinder: A Memoir of Seeing and Being Seen (First (hardcover) ed.). New York: Random House. ISBN 9780593448946. OCLC 1427239374. Archived from the original on 23 July 2024.
