= How Beautiful We Were =

2021 novel by Imbolo Mbue

- Author: Imbolo Mbue
- Language: English
- Subject: Environmentalism
- Genre: Literary fiction; Climate fiction
- Set in: Kosawa; fictional settlement in Africa
- Publisher: Random House
- Publication date: 2021
- Publication place: United States
- Media type: Print (hardcover and paperback), ebook
- Pages: 384
- ISBN: 978-0593132425 (Random House edition)

How Beautiful We Were is an environmentalist novel written by Cameroonian American author Imbolo Mbue. It is the second novel written by Mbue. Set in a fictional village in Africa, it follows of a set of villagers who challenge the government and an American oil company.

== Background and inspiration ==
Mbue's novel was influenced by her childhood days in Cameroon. Mbue started writing the novel seventeen years prior to publishing Behold the Dreamers in 2016. Mbue's "interest was more in writing a story about what happens when a group of people decides to push back against a powerful corporation." She cited Ken Saro-Wiwa and the environmental issues in the Niger Delta as her major influence.

== Plot summary ==
The book is set in the village of Kosawa, a fictional settlement in Africa under a monarchical system of government. The populace is angered by the arrival of the American oil firm Pexton, which leads to an oil spill that causes fatal diseases. Seeing the sufferings of his people, Kanga, the village mad man, convinces the villagers to lead a revolt but is opposed by the president of the country, a man wearing a "leopard skin hat tilted to the right". The revolution later involves young adults, particularly Thula who is described as a woman of fire. Thula, who had just graduated from a college in the United States, creates a militant organisation which she uses to spearhead the social protest against her people. The company in turn bribes some of the statesmen with scholarships, transports while the government grants them statutes, sowing a seed of discord in the village.

== Characters ==
- Kanga — described as the village mad man, Kanga begins the rebellion of the village by stealing the keys to the car that belonged to Pexton Men. His action leads men of Kanga to abduct Pexton men, and so their rebellion and revolution began.
- Thula Nangi — a young woman who takes over from Kanga in revolting using her knowledge of protest movements in the United States to dialogue with the government and Pexton.
- Yaya — Thula's grandmother.

Juba - Thula's brother. The five - Thula's agemate who support and lead the rebellion with her.

== Reception ==
The novel was listed in Brittle Paper's Notable Books of 2021.

Writing in The New York Times Book Review, Omar El Akkad was surprised by the direction the novel took: "What carries Mbue's decades-spanning fable of power and corruption is something much less clear-cut, and what starts as a David-and-Goliath story slowly transforms into a nuanced exploration of self-interest, of what it means to want in the age of capitalism and colonialism — these machines of malicious, insatiable wanting." In NPR, Tochi Onyebuchi expressed a similar sentiment, noting, "The novel's reach could have easily exceeded its grasp, given the weighty themes and its span, but Mbue reaches for the moon and, by the novel's end, has it firmly held in her hands." Ron Charles of The Washington Post describes the moral complexity of the book as one of its standout features: "Although How Beautiful We Were is a love letter to a communal way of life lived close to nature, it's not a wholly romantic vision that ignores the villagers' own flaws. Despite their 'brand of fragile innocence,' Mbue affords the people of Kosawa the full range of human decency and selfishness." In a starred review, Kirkus Reviews called the book, "A fierce, up-to-the-minute novel that makes you sad enough to grieve and angry enough to fight back."
