= Chef Chu's =

Chinese restaurant in Los Altos, California

Coordinates: 37.400666301112295°N 122.1136609067674°W

- Interactive map of Chef Chu's

Restaurant information
- Established: 1970
- Owner: Lawrence C.C Chu
- Food type: Chinese-American
- Location: 1067 N San Antonio Road, Los Altos, CA 94040
- Website: www.chefchu.com

Chef Chu's is a Chinese-American restaurant in Los Altos, California, owned by chef Lawrence Chu. It opened in 1970 and has been operating since, and is known for hosting several heads of state, tech elites, and celebrities, such as Steve Jobs, Margaret Thatcher, Mikhail Gorbachev, Jimmy Carter, Serena Williams, and Justin Bieber. The proprietor, Lawrence Chu, is also the father of director Jon M. Chu, known for directing the romantic comedy Crazy Rich Asians (2018) and the musical fantasy Wicked (2024). The restaurant is currently managed by Larry Jr., Chu's oldest son.

== History ==
Chef Chu's started as a take-out restaurant in a location in a strip mall, a former laundromat that sat alongside Howell’s Vacuum & Sewing and a beauty salon in 1970 by Lawrence C.C. Chu and his partner Ruth Ho. Chu's father operated a restaurant called Mandarin House where he learned the fundamentals of Chinese cooking from the head chef. Over the years, the restaurant expanded to occupy nearby businesses eventually occupying the whole building, including a second floor.

== Reception ==
Chef Chu's is widely considered to be one of the best Chinese-American restaurants in Silicon Valley, including tweet endorsements from Serena Williams and Justin Bieber. It was ranked three on the list of America's 50 best Chinese restaurants by CNN in 2017.
