= Atlantia (novel) =

2014 novel by Ally Condie

- Author: Ally Condie
- Cover artist: Theresa M. Evangelista
- Language: English
- Genre: Fantasy
- Publisher: the Penguin Group
- Publication date: 6 February 2014
- Publication place: the United States
- Media type: Print (paperback & hardcover)
- Pages: 298
- ISBN: 978-0-525-42644-8 (hardback)
- LC Class: PZ

Atlantia is a young adult novel authored by Allyson Braithwaite Condie. The cover photo for the hardcover edition is by C&P. The story is told from the perspective of Rio, a girl from the underwater city of Atlantia. This novel is recommended for ages 12 and up, and is a New York Times bestseller.

== Plot ==
The story begins when Rio attends the ceremony of the Divide. Initially, Rio wants to go aboveground, but she has promised her Below-loving twin sister, Bay, to remain in Atlantia, an artificial city built entirely underwater.

Rio completed the ritual before Bay, choosing to stay below, but Bay surprised Rio by choosing to go Above. In a panic, Rio accidentally revealed the siren voice she had hidden since birth to a priest, risking arrest, but she was able to leave without issue.

Rio searched desperately for an explanation for Bay's choice, eventually meeting her siren aunt, Maire, whom she last saw at her mother's funeral, and running away due to being engulfed in the memories of her late mother, Oceana. As she wept, she met True Beck, a boy whose best friend departed similarly to Bay, seeking a partner with whom to solve these mysteries Rio rejected his offer, and when she changed her mind, True was gone.

The next day, the Minister of Atlantia, Nevio, insisted that Rio would be best suited to work in the mining bays, sending her off to work there. When Rio finished her shift, Maire found her outside the temple and led her to the floodgates, where she explained to Rio that they could serve as an alternate path to the surface, as they did for Oceana. Maire gave Rio a seashell, in which she could ask questions and Maire would answer.

After her encounter with Maire, Rio went to the swimming lanes motivated to grow strong enough to go through the floodgates and to earn enough money to buy a pressurized air tank, but she found herself to be far less skilled than Bay.

After swimming, Rio went to the deep market to search for True, where she told him she changed her mind about working together. Nevio the Minister gave his sermon after the deep market closed early, leading Rio to discover his secret identity as a siren.

Several days later, Rio discovered her ability to command non-living objects using her siren voice, an ability unique to her and Maire. In a later discussion at Maire's apartment, Rio learned there had never been two sirens in a family until she was born.

The next day, True gave Rio money so she would not have to swim in the lanes, thinking Rio wanted to buy back her mother's ring. Rio disagreed, but accepted the money. When she was back in her room, she talked to Maire through the seashell. Maire told her that the Council poisoned her mother because she knew too much.

A breach drill was announced at work. Rio forgot her air mask, which she was supposed to carry all day. After a while, a siren voice over the loudspeakers told her this was a real breach.

As the minutes passed, no water rushed in. The breach in the deep market had been sealed off. There were no survivors.True revealed that he also heard Rio speak with her siren voice on the day of the Divide.

The next day, it was announced that group burials would be held, since the death toll was too high. Rio took this as a chance to go Above through the floodgates. However, she failed. The water was lowered, and she was caught.

Maire met Rio in her holding cell. She signalled for her to tell the public about her identity as a siren. Maire wanted Rio to help the Below. When Nevio entered the room, Rio decided to listen to Maire. She spoke using her real voice, knowing it was the only way to go Above.

Rio was permitted to go Above with the other sirens. Maire gave Rio a letter from Bay. Bay explained the reason she went Above: Sirens could not survive long Above. She left to keep Rio safe.

True was escorted into the transport just before it began to ascend. True revealed that he was not a siren, but he could tell when a siren is lying.

When Rio was Above, Maire told her how to escape. The sirens sang in harmony. The sirens were shot down one by one. Maire gave Rio a seashell with her mother's voice and gestured for her and True to escape.

Rio and True swam to the temple of the Above. Rio met Bay, Fen (True's best friend), and Ciro, the Above Minister. Bay told her about the miserable life Above for the people Below.

The next morning, Ciro entered the storage room True and Rio was hiding in. He confirmed the death of all the other sirens and told them about a showing of the sirens being held by Nevio and the Below Council. Rio decided to speak, too, at the viewing, despite the risk. Bay would descend Below with True and talk to the people there.

Rio woke up in the afternoon. Someone tried to unlock the door to the storage room. Bay and Fen hid in the back closet and locked it from the inside. Nevio and an Above Council member arrived. The temple bats were brought Above and into the storage room. Nevio opened the closet and dumped a dead Ciro and temple bat inside.

Rio made herself seen by Nevio. She spoke to the people Above. She was weakened by the Above, but when she was about to pass out, one of the bats came. Rio realized that the bats could provide her strength. She talked about Atlantia and the need to save the city. Hundreds of temple bats soared past Nevio to land on Rio. As the bats flew away, Rio felt the strength leave her.

When Rio woke up again, she was in the transport, going Below. Her speech worked. However, Rio has sacrificed her siren voice to the Above.

Later, Rio is with Bay, and notices that her siren voice is present again, but she is no longer afraid.

== Reception ==
Atlantia received reviews from the School Library Journal, Justine Magazine, Salt Lake City Weekly, and Shelf Awareness.

Atlantia was also reviewed by multiple noted authors, including Shannon Hale, who wrote, "“Utterly captivating. A heroine unlike any I’d met before, a setting I’d never glimpsed, a story I’d never imagined. Atlantia is fresh, wild, and engrossing. I love Ally Condie.”
