= The Wangs vs. the World =

2016 comic novel by Jade Chang

- Front of the dustjacket for the (1st) hardback edition
- Author: Jade Chang
- Cover artist: Kimberly Glyder
- Language: English
- Genre: Literary fiction
- Published: 2016 (Houghton Mifflin Harcourt)
- Publication place: United States
- Media type: Print (Hardback with dustjacket); ebook
- Pages: 354 (1st hardback edition)
- ISBN: 978-0-544-73409-8
- OCLC: 932050574
- Website: thewangs.com

The Wangs vs. the World is the debut comic novel by Jade Chang, published in 2016. The novel chronicles the cross-country road trip of Chinese/Taiwanese immigrant Charles Wang and his family to his eldest daughter's house after Wang's bankruptcy during the 2008 financial crisis. As common to immigrant families, dialogue between family members is conducted in a mix of the adopted country's language (English) and native tongue (Mandarin Chinese, romanized for print but otherwise untranslated).

== Plot ==
Charles Wang is the patriarch of a family of five, a self-made millionaire who parlayed his family connections to the urea industry into a cosmetics empire. He would bet the future of the company (and his personal fortune) on the success of a new line of cosmetics designed to appeal to "ethnic" skin types, but the line was not a success. During the 2008 financial crisis, his creditors were reluctant to lend more money and repossessed his business and personal assets.

The novel opens as Charles and second wife Barbra (an immigrant from Taiwan who chose her English name from Barbra Streisand) prepare to pack some clothes and personal items for a road trip from their soon-to-be-foreclosed Bel Air mansion to upstate New York, where they will live with his eldest child, daughter Saina. They will be driving a 1980-vintage Mercedes Benz station wagon, which Charles had purchased for his first wife, May Lee, while she was pregnant with their first child. Along the way they plan to pick up the youngest child, daughter Grace, from a boarding school near Santa Barbara, and middle child, son Andrew, from Arizona State University in Tempe.

== Major themes ==
The novel tackles the immigrant experience in America, specifically by skewering stereotypes of Asian-Americans. The three Wang children are "creative and popular" rather than hewing to the quiet, studious and nerdy model minority image.

The American Dream also figures prominently in the novel. Although he had been quite prosperous, Charles's personal thoughts turn to a quixotic reclamation of an aristocratic lineage and land in mainland China after he loses his fortune, making him believe his future lies in China, not America. Previously, Charles had embraced American ideals to the point where he urged his kids to "play the guitar and get laid," his interpretation of what America had to offer. Despite this, America is seen as a multicultural nation where dialogue is occasionally written in untranslated Mandarin.

The novel was also written to show that immigrant stories were not universally filled with pain and struggle.

=== Development ===
In 2008, Chang attended an "over the top" launch party for Trump Tower Dubai, held in a Bel Air mansion, as an editor for the luxury magazine Angeleno. While waiting for the valet to retrieve her car after the party, she found an iPod Touch in her gift bag and was inspired to write about the impending upheaval: "We are about to collapse under the weight of our own excess ... [but] when the world falls apart, anything can happen. That's so scary, but it's also kind of electric and exciting, too." Chang wrote The Wangs over a period of five years after that party. When Chang submitted the unsolicited manuscript to Eddie Huang's literary agent, it was accepted and publishing rights were put up for auction. Houghton Mifflin Harcourt won the bidding, and made it their lead novel for October 2016.

=== Publication history ===
- —, 2016, US, Houghton Mifflin Harcourt ISBN 978-0-544-73409-8, Pub date 4 Oct 2016, Hardback/dustjacket
- —, 2016, US, Houghton Mifflin Harcourt ISBN 9780544734203, Pub date 4 Oct 2016, ebook
- Los Wang contra el mundo (translated by Puerto Barruetabeña Díez), 2016, Spain, Kailas Editorial ISBN 978-84-16523-20-7
- Les Wang contre le monde entier (translated by Catherine Gibert), 2017, France, Belfond ISBN 2714474136
- La famiglia Wang contro il resto del mondo (translated by Federica Aceto, Sara Sedehi), 2017, Italy, Ponte alle Grazie ISBN 9788868335045, ISBN 9788868338381 (ebook)

=== Technical information ===
Kimberly Glyder designed, lettered, and illustrated the hardcover dustjacket. The United States paperback cover was illustrated by Gill Heeley.

== Reception ==
Jason Heller, writing for NPR, cited the road trip as a particular highlight, as the forced company "makes for some side-splitting friction" and noted "their madcap trip serves as a travelogue of American weirdness," referencing the different cultures the Wangs encounter between Los Angeles and New York. Kevin Nguyen, writing for The New York Times, said the novel was "compassionate and bright-eyed" as it proved "that struggling with identity can at least be funny and strange, especially when you struggle together with family." Sylvia Brownrigg, writing for The Guardian, called it a "richly entertaining debut" and a "smart and engaging novel."

The novel was later listed as one of NPR's Best Books of 2016.

== Television series ==
In January 2018, it was reported that streaming service Hulu was developing a television series adaptation of the novel. Chang will adapt her novel and Jon M. Chu will direct should the script move to pilot. The project will be produced by Groundswell Productions.

== See also ==
- Behold the Dreamers, a debut novel with similar themes by Imbolo Mbue
