= Crossed (novel) =

2011 novel by Allyson Condie

- First edition cover
- Author: Allyson Braithwaite Condie
- Language: English
- Series: Matched trilogy
- Genre: Young adult, romance, dystopian
- Publisher: Dutton Juvenile
- Publication date: November 1, 2011
- Publication place: United States
- Media type: Print (hardback or softback)
- Pages: 367
- Preceded by: Matched
- Followed by: Reached

Crossed is a young adult novel written by Allyson Braithwaite Condie. It is the sequel to Matched and the second book in the Matched trilogy, which concludes with Reached. Told in the alternating perspectives of Cassia and Ky, the novel is largely set in a desert canyon which was inspired by Condie's experience growing up in southern Utah. The plot follows Cassia and Ky's respective journeys to find each other again in the outer provinces as they begin to learn of a growing rebellion against the Society. Reception to the novel was mixed and the novel reached The New York Times bestseller's list for children's chapter books.

== Background ==
According to Condie, she decided right away that the novel needed to be told from the perspectives of Ky and Cassia. While Cassia is important and still the main character, she considers Crossed Ky's book. Additionally, the novel's desert canyon setting was inspired by her childhood experiences of growing up in southern Utah.

== Plot ==
The chapters alternate between the perspectives of Ky and Cassia. The outer provinces are filled with male "aberrations", including Ky and his new friend Vick who are moved around from village to village to make them appear inhabited to an unnamed enemy. Cassia, now at a work camp in Tana province, plans to find Ky. She is surprised by a visit from Xander who, as her match, was able to arrange a meeting with Cassia. At Cassia's request, they go to a small museum where Cassia trades Ky's compass with an archivist in order to obtain information that could help her find Ky. Meanwhile, Ky and the other decoys are moved to Ky's home village where a new shipment of decoys arrives filled with young teenage boys.

Cassia's message from the archivist tells of "the rising", a rebellion against the Society, led by "the pilot". In the morning, Cassia sneaks onto an airship taking some of the girls, including her friend Indie, to the outer provinces. During the Enemy attack that night, Ky, Vick, and Eli, one of the new villagers, escape and head toward the canyon, called the Carving. Cassia and Indie arrive at the outer provinces and meet a boy who claimed to see Ky, Vick, and Eli escape. That night, they escape to the Carving together and reach it before dawn where the boy parts ways with the girls. Meanwhile, Ky, Vick, and Eli find a recently abandoned farmers township where they find a map of the canyon. They continue and an airship drops large boulders to release toxins into the river, causing Vick to be killed on impact. Afterwards, Cassia and Ky reunite.

Cassia, Indie, Ky, and Eli return to the township where they find a young man named Hunter, the only farmer left in the township. Together, they travel to an old cavern that the Society has taken over. Inside they find hundreds of thousands of tubes, each with individual tissue samples of all citizens of the Society. Hunter starts breaking tubes, setting off the alarm. The four escape, leaving Hunter. In a flashback, Ky reveals that his father was a member of the Rising and was in line to be a pilot. His father was killed for holding a meeting for the rebellion. Indie reveals to Ky that she found a map to the Rising, that she believes he is destined to be the pilot. She suggests they leave to find the rising, leaving Eli and Cassia behind. She figures out that Xander's secret is that he is a member of the Rising. Hunter returns and tries to find the map to the Rising for Cassia, but Ky already started burning it. Ky suggests that they join the farmers because he does not trust the Society nor the Rising, but she refuses.

When they reach the edge of the cavern, Eli chooses to follow Hunter into the mountains to find the farmers. Cassia and Indie travel on a boat in the river and Ky runs alongside them because the boat is too small. He carries the tissue tubes of Cassia's grandfather and Vick. Cassia and Indie make it to the end of the river to a lake where a boat full of members of the rising take them to their camp. When Ky eventually arrives, he is assigned as an airship pilot to be trained in Camas Province. Ky finds Indie but learns that Cassia has already been sent to Central Province to serve the Rising within the Society. Ky makes a deal with an archivist to get Cassia papers to trade in the Society. The novel ends a few months later. Cassia receives a message from the Rising from Ky and plans to meet him after work.

== Reception ==
Critical reception to Crossed was mixed, with the Tampa Bay Times praising the book's "mental mystery and emotional aspects". Kidz World commented that the book "seemed to miss the mark. The entire book was spent in the Outer Provinces, which was not only visually dry, but offered little action and excitement." Publishers Weekly and Kirkus Reviews both gave the entry positive reviews, with Publishers Weekly stating that while readers will need to read the previous book, Crossed's "vivid, poetic writing will pull fans through as Condie immerses readers in her characters' yearnings and hopes".

The books reached the best on the New York Times bestseller list for children's chapter books, which includes young adult novels.
