= Reached =

2012 novel by Allyson Braithwaite Condie

- Original cover
- Author: Allyson Braithwaite Condie
- Language: English
- Series: Matched trilogy
- Subject: Dystopia
- Genre: Young adult, romance, dystopian
- Publisher: Dutton Juvenile
- Publication date: November 13, 2012
- Publication place: United States
- Pages: 512
- Preceded by: Crossed

Reached is a 2012 young adult dystopian novel by Allyson Braithwaite Condie and is the final novel in the Matched Trilogy, preceded by Matched and Crossed. The novel was published on November 13, 2012, by Dutton Juvenile and was set to have a first printing of 500,000 copies. The novel is told from the viewpoints of Cassia, Ky, and Xander, a point that Condie insisted on. The plot follows the experiences of the three protagonists with the rising of the rebellion against the Society, the race to find the cure against a plague of mysterious origin, and discovering the real intentions of the Rising. Critical reception of the novel was positive and it reached No. 6 on USA Today's Best Selling Books list in 2012.

== Plot summary ==
Told in the alternating perspectives of Xander, Cassia, and Ky, the novel begins with Xander attending the welcoming ceremony of a new baby born into the Society. Xander is now working as an official in the medical department with another official named Lei, but he is secretly working for the Rising, a network of rebels against the Society. He reveals that the tablets given to newborns are switched by rebels which contain immunity to the red, memory-erasing tablets and immunity to the viral plague which is ravaging the Society. Cassia is working in the Capital as a sorter while Ky is in Camas training to be an Airship pilot for the Rising. When Ky and Indie are placed on the same ship to deliver medical supplies to Grandia City, the leader of the Rising, called the Pilot, reveals that they are on a special mission to initiate the rebellion and bring the cure for the plague as the Society plunges into disarray.

Months later, the Rising has taken control of the Society, but the majority of its resources are being put into curing the infected. However, the medics realize the virus has mutated into a more dangerous form. Those who had been immunized are not safe from the mutated virus, but those who caught the first strain of the virus are immune, signified by a red mark on their back. In Central, Cassia forms a group of people willing to share their art and talents with each other called the Gallery. Lei does not have the mark and contracts the virus. Indie picks up Cassia and Xander on an airship and brings them to the Pilot where it is revealed that Cassia and Xander are immune, but Ky is not. After being exposed to the virus, Ky starts getting sick. They agree to help the Pilot find the cure by working with villagers in Endstone outside of the Society who are immune. There, Ky is bedridden with the virus while Cassia works with the head sorter. Xander works with a renowned scientist named Oker to develop a cure. Cassia meets Anna, Hunter's mother-in-law who lead to farmers out of the Carving. The work for the cure is arduous and the lines between the Rising and the Society begin to blur; Oker tells Xander that the blue tablet is a trigger for the virus, not a poison and that the Society purposefully infected everyone.

Oker dies before he could develop the cure, but Cassia realizes that Oker had discovered that Mariposa Lily was the cure before he died. Xander makes the cure from jail and they administer it to Ky. The Pilot arrives, demanding a cure, stating that a faction in the Rising intends to usurp his position. Cassia insists that the cure is working on Ky and the Pilot rushes Cassia, Xander, and Ky to Camas. It is revealed that Indie died after her plane crashed when she ran out of fuel after realizing she contracted the virus and tried to leave. The Pilot tells them that while the Rising was a real rebellion, it has become so infiltrated by the Society that there are few differences between them. Cassia goes to Keya to try and cure her sick parents because her mother can lead them to more Mariposa Lily and discovers her father is already dead. Xander begins administering the cure to a trial group in Camas, while Cassia's mother begins to recover. Cassia has a realization that she unknowingly added Ky to the Matching Pool but could not remember because of the red tablet.

At the end of the novel, they have begun to administer the cure on a large scale and defeat the virus. An election in Camas is held to determine the new leader of the society. Xander and Lei confess their love for each other and stay in Endstone; Lei was Laney, the match of Vick. Ky and Cassia convince Anna to leave Endstone in order to run for office and represent the people rather than the Society or the Rising.

== Reception ==
Critical reception for the book has been positive. Kirkus Reviews praised Reached, calling it a "breathless finale". Publishers Weekly also praised the novel, writing that fans of the series will be "satisfied with the fates of their favorites". Christine Rappleye in the Salt Lake Telegram said it was "an exciting and satisfying ending to the trilogy as the unpredictable happens..." According to Sara Scribner of the Los Angeles Times, Reached was better than the second novel of the series but failed to outshine the opening novel Matched. Scribner criticized the complexity of the three alternating perspectives, stating that they made the novel hard to follow. By sharing the perspectives of Ky and Xander, readers lose the thrill of not knowing what their intentions are.

The novel reached No. 6 on USA Today's Best Selling Books list in 2012.
