= Behold the Dreamers =

2016 novel by Imbolo Mbue

- Cover of the first United States edition (2016)
- Author: Imbolo Mbue
- Cover artist: Jaya Miceli
- Language: English
- Genre: Fiction
- Published: 2016
- Publisher: Random House
- Publication place: United States
- Pages: 382 pp
- ISBN: 978-0-8129-9848-1 (Hardcover)

Behold the Dreamers is a 2016 debut novel by Imbolo Mbue. The novel details the experiences of two New York City families during the 2008 financial crisis: an immigrant family from Cameroon, the Jonga family, and their wealthy employers, the Edwards family.

== Plot ==
The novel opens in fall 2007 with the interview of an immigrant from Cameroon, Jende Jonga, who is hoping to be hired as a chauffeur for Clark Edwards, a Lehman Brothers executive. Jonga's job allows him to pay his wife's college tuition and send money back home until the bankruptcy of Lehman Brothers threatens both families. Jende Jonga is also seeking permanent residency through a false asylum request.

== Major themes ==
In Mbue's novel, the immigrant family are discomfited by the transition to a new place, and find themselves changing in response, which was called "a fresh take on the immigrant experience".

=== Development ===
Mbue lost her job during the 2008 financial crisis and was unemployed for a year and a half. She wrote the novel to explain her new understanding that "the American dream is not that accessible to everybody". Mbue was inspired to write Behold the Dreamers after walking past the Time Warner Center in Columbus Circle, where she noticed black chauffeurs waiting for white executives and wondered about "the intersection of their lives".

Mbue was inspired to become a writer after reading the Toni Morrison novel Song of Solomon, which she had picked up because it was filed on a separate shelf in a Falls Church library after it had been selected for Oprah's Book Club. She wrote the novel over a period of five years without telling friends or family, none of whom read it prior to its publication.

In 2014, Mbue signed a million dollar deal with Random House for Behold the Dreamers, which was then titled The Longings of Jende Jonga. Mbue credits a line from the Langston Hughes poem "Let America be America Again" with inspiring the revised title.

=== Publication history ===
- — (2016). Behold the Dreamers (1st hdbk ed.). Random House. ISBN 978-0812998481.

=== Technical details ===
The cover for the first US edition was designed and lettered by Jaya Miceli. Since its initial publication, the novel has been translated into eleven languages.

== Reception ==
Cristina Henríquez, writing for The New York Times, called it "a capacious, big-hearted novel" and praised Mbue's writing as suffused "with great confidence and warmth". Ron Charles, book critic for The Washington Post, wrote that Mbue was "a bright and captivating storyteller" and said the novel avoided the cliches associated with most immigrant stories: "Mbue attains something fresh and insightful here." In a starred review, Kirkus Reviews praised the novel, describing it as, "Realistic, tragic, and still remarkably kind to all its characters, this is a special book."

=== Awards and recognition ===
In 2017, she won the PEN/Faulkner Award for this novel. In June 2017, it was also selected by Oprah Winfrey for her book club.

In 2022, Behold the Dreamers was included on the "Big Jubilee Read" list of 70 books by Commonwealth authors, selected to celebrate the Platinum Jubilee of Elizabeth II.

== See also ==
- The Wangs vs. the World, a debut novel with similar themes by Jade Chang
