= Matched trilogy =

Dystopian YA romance series

Matched
- The Matched trilogy box set image
- Matched (2010); Crossed (2011); Reached (2012)
- Author: Ally Condie
- Country: United States
- Language: English
- Genre: Dystopian, young adult, and romance
- Publisher: Dutton's Books
- Published: 2010–2012
- Media type: Print (hardcover and paperback), audiobook, e-book
- No. of books: 3
- Website: allycondie.com

The Matched trilogy is a young adult, dystopian fiction series written by American author Ally Condie, set in a centrally governed society. The Society seems to be formed after an apocalyptical global warming event. The novel Matched was published by Dutton Penguin in November 2010 and reached number three on the Children's Chapter Books bestseller list in January. Previously working with a small, Utah-based publisher (Deseret Book Co.), Condie took her manuscript to Penguin Random House, after being advised to do so from her director at Deseret Book. This helped the novel reach a national audience. The Matched novel has been optioned to the Walt Disney Company for a film adaptation. Foreign rights were sold to 30 countries before publication. The second book, Crossed, was published in November 2011, and Reached, published November 2012, completed the trilogy.

== Setting ==
Condie's Matched trilogy takes place in a futuristic, dystopian world in the present-day United States, known simply as the Society. The Society maintains tight control of all aspects of its citizens' lives, from the food they eat, to the way they spend their free time, to whom they are allowed to love. Nutrition in Society is controlled by nutrition specialists, who decide the proper content and portion of food citizens require to be their healthiest selves. Free time is to be spent in an assortment of pre-determined wholesome activities. In the first book, Cassia Reyes chooses hiking as her activity. Good-standing citizens are eligible to be "matched" when they are seventeen years old to their most compatible partner, who is predetermined by the Society.

Cassia lives in Mapletree Borough, a neighborhood ornamented with its namesake (at the conclusion of the first book, the Society destroys the maple trees and renames it Garden Borough). Mapletree Borough is part of Oria Province, a constituent to the Society. Oria is a well-off province, though as the provinces geographically move farther from the Capital City, Central, they become less developed. These are referred to as the Outer Provinces, where the Society wars against an unknown force known as the Enemy. The Society has less control over the Outer Provinces, so the laws are more relaxed in these areas.

== Novels ==
=== Matched ===
Matched is the first novel in the series and was published November 30, 2010.

Matched begins with Cassia Maria Reyes, a seventeen-year-old girl in the Society, attending her Match Banquet. To Cassia's surprise, she is matched to her childhood best friend Xander Carrow. The next day when Cassia tries to research her Match on her microcard, it is not Xander's face that shows up, but that of Ky Markham, a boy in Mapletree Borough. An Official informs Cassia that Ky cannot be her Match, because he is an Aberration. Ky's adoptive father committed an Infraction, thus prohibiting Ky from entering the Matching pool. Though Cassia is assured by the Official that the Matching mix-up was someone playing a cruel joke, Cassia begins to wonder if her seemingly perfect Society is capable of making mistakes.

The elderly are euthanized at age eighty in the Society. On her elderly grandfather's final day, he reveals two poems he has kept secret for Cassia. The Society limits the amount of artwork the citizens are allowed to consume, so by keeping these poems both Cassia and her grandfather have committed a secret infraction. The poems are "Do not go gentle into that good night", by Dylan Thomas (1914–1953) and "Crossing the Bar" by Lord Alfred Tennyson (1809–1892). Ky spies Cassia reading the poems, and helps her memorize the contents before destroying the paper. As Cassia and Ky spend more time together, they begin to develop feelings for each other. Ky teaches Cassia how to write—another dangerous infraction.

The novel ends with a final test in Cassia's work as a "sorter". She is tasked with sorting the most efficient workers at the plant where Ky works. Cassia sorts Ky into the most efficient category, even though this means that he will be relocated to pursue higher-level work. Instead, Ky is sent to the outer provinces' military to fight against "the Enemy" for his infractions. To erase Ky's disappearance from memory, the Mapletree Borough is instructed by Officials to take their red pills. Cassia discreetly destroys her red pill. The Reyes family is relocated to the Farmlands and Cassia to a work camp for her infractions committed with Ky.

=== Crossed ===
Crossed is the second novel in the series and was released November 1, 2011. This novel is told from the alternating perspectives of both Cassia and Ky as they lead individual journeys to find each other. The desert and canyon settings for this novel were inspired by author Ally Condie's childhood in southern Utah.

Cassia's relationship with Ky was an act of rebellion, and Cassia is punished by being sent to a three-month long work camp. While there, Cassia makes plans to find Ky, who has been sent to the outer provinces' military. Xander visits Cassia unexpectedly at her work camp, and they tour the province's small museum. Cassia trades Ky's compass with the museum archivist for information on how to get to the outer provinces. From the archivist, Cassia learns about an uprising against the Society, led by "the Pilot". Cassia sneaks onto an airship headed toward the outer provinces. Her bunkmate Indie also escapes. When the airship lands, they find out they have missed Ky by only a few days. Ky and his new friends Vick and Eli have escaped into the canyon, called the Carving. Vick is similar in age to Ky, and Eli reminds Ky of Cassia's younger brother, Bram. Cassia and Indie enter the Carving, hoping to find the boys. As they journey, Cassia and Indie discover that the blue tablets are not nutrition like they had been taught, but poison. Back in the boys' group, Vick dies in an air strike. After Ky and Eli bury Vick, Cassia and Indie finally catch up to them. The four of them return to the farming village outside of the Carving, hoping to find information on the Rising. They meet Hunter, the last farmer in the village. Hunter agrees to trade his knowledge of the Rising for knowledge of what the Society is hiding in a nearby canyon. The group stealthily enters the canyon and discover that it is a storage unit for tissue samples, which have been collected from the dead. The Society plans to use the tissue samples to regenerate individuals after they have been euthanized. The characters begin to wonder if regeneration was ever a possibility and if perhaps the tissue samples were just a method of psychological control. When an alarm goes off, Hunter stays behind and destroys the samples while the others escape.

When the group finds a map that would lead them to the Rising, Ky subtly tries to destroy it. Cassia stops him and urges him and Indie follow where the map leads. Ky is wary of both the Society and the Rising, and wants nothing to do with either. When Cassia insists on finding the Rising, Ky follows so he can stay with her. When Ky, Cassia, and Indie arrive, Cassia is sent to the Society to act as a spy and Ky becomes a pilot.

=== Reached ===
Reached concludes the Matched trilogy. It is told from the perspectives of Cassia, Ky, and Xander. The Rising sends Cassia to work undercover as a sorter in the capital city, Xander to work as an Official, and Ky to train as an airship pilot in Camas province. Xander has been secretly working for the Rising. As a medical official, he swaps out the tablets given to Society newborns for tablets made by the Rising. These new tablets offer immunity to the red, memory-erasing pill as well as to a new and deadly plague.

The new virus is triggered by the blue tablets, administered by the Society. As the virus mutates, those who have already been exposed to the first strain become immune. Cassia and Xander realize they are immune, but Ky contracts the new strain and becomes ill. The three go to Endstone, outside of the Society, and work with the Pilot to find a cure. Xander searches for the medical cure with a scientist named Oker. It is here that Oker reveals to Xander that the blue pills trigger the virus. Oker dies before the cure is made, but Cassia finds out that Oker has discovered the plant that will create the cure—Mariposa lily. Xander turns the flower into a cure and Cassia administers it to Ky, who begins to recover. The Pilot reveals to the group that a faction of the Rising wants him removed from leadership. The Rising has become infiltrated with Society members, and it becomes more difficult to distinguish the two groups and their goals. Indie dies in a plane crash after contracting the virus.

Cassia finds her family in the Farmlands and delivers the cure, only to find out that her father has already died from the plague. Her mother has also fallen ill, but begins to recover. She helps Cassia collect more of the Mariposa lily. The cure is distributed everywhere and the citizens begin to recover. Xander and a fellow Official named Lei fall in love. Lei had been the previous match to Vick, who died in the Carving. Ky and Cassia return to Cassia's family in the Farmlands and Cassia destroys her grandfather's tissue sample, coming to terms with his passing. The citizens decide to vote for their next leader democratically.

== Dystopian YA ==
The series can be best described as young adult (YA) literature, because of its emphasis on the characters and their development over action and story building. The complexity of the series' plot also distinguishes it as YA. The problem-solving skills that YA fiction characters use to reflect on their circumstances parallels the mental and emotional development in adolescents. The intensity of emotions in the trilogy, however, make it an important crossover series, since this is something that both teens and adults can relate to.

The trilogy is also dystopian literature. In Matched, the world in which the characters live is introduced as a utopian society. Unlike other modern dystopian works, the imperfect nature of the society is not made known until later in the novel. It was important to Condie that the Society appeared three-dimensional. She wanted her readers to understand why the citizens of her society would submit to its control. Condie also comments on the fact that her heroine, Cassia, is still unaware of the dark nature of her Society. Thus, Cassia and the readership come to these realizations together and develop YA fiction's theme of "coming of age".

Dystopian fiction has dramatically increased in popularity for the twenty-first century YA audience. Much of twenty-first century dystopian literature, including the Matched trilogy, falls into the category of critical dystopia, which takes a more hopeful look at society. While Cassia's Society is flawed in its idealism, the characters are not overwhelmed by authoritarianism at the end of the series; rather, there is a hopeful resolution that political and social reform can occur.

== Themes ==
Like in many dystopian works, the governing Society in this trilogy seeks to control its populace through a number of methods. One method the Society employs is censorship of the arts, where the citizens are limited to viewing only one hundred works of poetry, painting, etc. Language arts play a particularly important role in the Matched trilogy. As Ky teaches Cassia to write (a skill which most of the citizens are forbidden to learn), Cassia learns another method of communication. As Cassia reads the forbidden poetry from her grandfather, she learns how words can be used as expression. Both are rebellious acts against the Society. The Society also exercises emotional suppression through the green and red tablets, which suppress anxiety and memory, respectively. Condie uses emotions (specifically love) as a motif in the Matched trilogy. Choosing to love each other is the most obvious form of rebellion that the characters Cassia and Ky make. The power of relationships can be seen through Cassia's attachment to Ky and the way they influence each other's thinking and behavior. As their relationship progresses, Cassia is inspired to rebel against the Society more. Condie uses the romantic relationship of Cassia and Ky as a literary tool to push her characters' thinking in a new direction.

The maturation of her young characters is another concept that Condie delves into. This is evidenced through Cassia reconciling her strong emotions and logical brain. Cassia comes to resolutions about her personal relationships and her society throughout the series, using both her head and her heart. While these two decision-making skills seem at war with each other in the beginning, their meshing through the progression of the story is indicative of her coming-of-age. Related to the theme of maturation is agency. Since the Society has eliminated practically all decision-making, Cassia must learn how to become her own personal agent. As Cassia learns to ask questions and make her own choices, she marks a transition from childhood into emerging adulthood.

=== Structure of the series ===
The Matched series encourages young adults to think critically about their own society, and not be afraid to challenge norms. The plotlines of the three books in the series seem to echo this thinking pattern: Matched emphasizes discovery, as the reader slowly comes to the conclusion that Cassia's society is dystopian, through her limited perspective. Crossed emphasizes critical thinking as the characters are removed from their comfort zones and forced to carve their own journeys towards what is right. Finally, Reached emphasizes the rebuilding of the dystopian society. Placing the themes of reconstruction and hope at the end of the story arc is a pattern that is also evident in other dystopian works.

In Crossed, the readership learns more about the dystopian nature of the society. The book is also narrated from two perspectives (Cassia's and Ky's) instead of one. Cassia matures throughout the series, and this is specifically evidenced in Crossed when her priorities begin to rearrange. Her desire to be with Ky is not totally replaced, but rather preceded by, her desire to challenge and change the Society.

The final book, Reached, is told from three perspectives: Cassia's, Ky's, and Xander's. The characters in this novel are driven to find a cure to the deadly Plague, a literary device that pushes the plot towards reconstructing the fallen, dystopian government. Cassia exhibits further maturity in this novel when the concept of voting is presented. As the characters in Condie's novel examine a democratic solution to the Plague, Cassia reminds the readers (through her decision to not vote yet) of the responsibility citizens hold to be informed civil participants.

=== Inspiration ===
The series was inspired by Condie's experience chaperoning for a prom as part of her duties as a high school English teacher at Timpview High School in Provo, Utah, and by a conversation with her husband about what it would be like if the government dictated marriage partners.

Some of Condie's thematic elements come as inspiration from her background as a member of the Church of Jesus Christ of Latter-day Saints (LDS Church). The Matched series explores popular dystopian themes: determinism versus freedom, and the ability to choose. Agency, choice, and accountability are important themes in LDS Church gospel that Condie expands upon in the Matched trilogy. This is done through an emphasis on art and Condie's overarching theme of love. Condie's use of lyricism and prose in her writing style calls further attention to the artistic theme.

== Reception ==
Each novel in the Matched trilogy received a starred review on Kirkus Reviews. Matched has been compared to Lois Lowry's classic novel The Giver, while still providing unique insights to the dystopian genre. Further differentiating the novel, the Los Angeles Times called Matched "cool and sophisticated" where Suzanne Collins' Hunger Games were "red hot and bloodthirsty". Crossed received more mixed reviews, though Kirkus claimed that while not as tightly "woven" as Matched, Crossed still delivered new insights to the trilogy through Tennyson's poem "Crossing the Bar", and the exotic canyon setting. The lack of tension and intrigue in Crossed could be attributed to the fact that the second novel was intended to act as a "transition" between the first and the last books in the series. The Los Angeles Times claimed the novel felt "aimless". The anticipated release of Reached brought more positive feedback. It was cited as being better than Crossed, but nowhere near the level of Matched. Kirkus Reviews described Condie's writing as "immediate and unadorned", and told readers that the "breathless finale" would keep them reading "all night".

== Film Adaptation ==
Disney purchased the film rights to the series, and production planning is in order for the first book.
