= Matched (book) =

2010 dystopian novel by Ally Condie

- Author: Ally Condie
- Language: English
- Series: Matched trilogy
- Genre: Dystopian
- Publisher: Dutton Juvenile
- Publication date: November 30, 2010
- Publication place: United States
- Media type: Print (Hardback Or Paperback)
- Pages: 366
- ISBN: 9780142419779
- OCLC: 712116974
- LC Class: PZ7.C7586 Mat 2010
- Followed by: Crossed

Matched, by Ally Condie, is the first novel in the Matched trilogy. The novel is a dystopian young adult novel about a tightly controlled society in which young people are "matched" with their life partners at the age of 17. The main character is 18-year-old Cassia Reyes, who is Matched with her best friend, Xander Carrow. However, when viewing the information for her Match, the picture of another young man Ky Markham, an acquaintance outcast at her school, is flashed across the screen. As Cassia attempts to figure out the source of the mishap, she finds herself conflicted about whether her Match is appropriate for her–and whether the Society is all that it seems to be. This book is followed by Crossed and Reached.

Condie was inspired to write the novel after chaperoning a high school dance and considering what would happen if the government devised a perfect algorithm for matching people into romantic pairs. After its release, the book received largely positive reviews and reached The New York Times bestseller list in 2010. The novel explores young adult themes such as control, courtship, rebellion, and agency, which are strengthened by her poetic writing style and frequent references to poems. Disney optioned and began early production of the Matched trilogy films in 2010, but no further development has been reported.

== Background ==
The idea for Matched was presented in 2008 when Condie's husband, an economist, asked her, "What if someone wrote the perfect algorithm for lining people up, and the government used it to decide who you married, when you married, etc.?" Condie was also inspired by a time when she chaperoned a high school prom as well as other experiences, such as falling in love and becoming a parent. Although her novel has been often compared to The Hunger Games, Condie states that she was more influenced by older dystopian fiction such as 1984 by George Orwell and Ray Bradbury's short story "There Will Come Soft Rains". It took her about nine and a half months to write the book. Condie had not yet written novels for a mainstream audience and sought out agent Jodie Reamer. Penguin won the bid against six other publishers for a trilogy.

== Plot ==
Seventeen-year-old Cassia Reyes lives in a futuristic, seemingly utopian world in which the citizens' lives are strictly controlled by the government called "The Society". At the age of seventeen, citizens undergo the process of being "matched" or becoming paired up with another boy/girl selected by the sorters (authorities). At the beginning of the novel, Cassia is led to the Match Banquet by her parents. She becomes overjoyed when she realizes that her Match is her best friend, Xander Carrow. Cassia is excited about their future together. When Cassia decides to view the information about Xander, the screen glitches and displays another face: that of Ky Markham, another young man who lives in her borough. Later that day, an official visits Cassia to clarify that Xander is her correct match. The official reveals that Ky is an aberration: a semi-outcast member of society who usually acquires this identity through committing an "Infraction". She tells Cassia that Ky's father committed a serious Infraction, and although Ky was adopted by his aunt and uncle at a young age, he had to retain his identity as an aberration and therefore cannot be matched with anyone. Cassia only tells her beloved grandfather, a man nearing his 80th birthday. Her grandfather encourages her to find the words within her and gives her a forbidden piece of paper.

Cassia chooses hiking as her summer recreation activity, and while in the woods she peeks at her grandfather's paper, which has two poems that are not in the Society's allotted hundred poems, a dangerous Infraction. Coincidentally, Ky Markham has also chosen hiking, and he spots her in the woods reading the paper. He promises to keep her secret and help her destroy the poems after she memorizes them. He teaches her how to write words in the dirt, and as they spend more time together, they slowly fall in love. Her growing feelings for Ky make her question her relationship with Xander and the wisdom of the matching system; over time, she grows more and more frustrated with the Society's control over her relationship and her ability to express herself through poetry and writing, which is forbidden. Meanwhile, the Society raids everyone's homes in order to collect meaningful personal items called "artifacts", which they believe promote inequality.

Aware of her feelings for Ky, her official threatens that she will become an aberration and Ky will be sent to the outer provinces if she allows a romantic relationship with Ky to develop. Cassia is administered a final test for becoming a sorter that requires her to sort the most efficient workers at the nutritional disposal plant. She sorts Ky into the highest group even though he might be transferred to another city for a higher level vocation. Cassia and Ky kiss for the first time, but the next day, officials lead Ky away in handcuffs to the outer provinces to fight against the enemy. The neighborhood is instructed to take their red pills, which erase recent memories, and Cassia discreetly drops hers on the ground and crushes it. The Reyes family is notified of their mandatory relocation to the farmlands. Cassia's official reveals to Cassia that her relationship with Ky was monitored by the Society as an experiment to validate the theory of their matches. She claims to have purposefully put Ky into the matching pool but Cassia suspects she's lying. Later, Xander reveals that the red pills do not work on him or Ky and gives Cassia a large number of blue tablets, which affect her nutrient intake. Cassia is sent to a work camp for showing signs of rebellion. At her parents' request, she is sent to a camp near the Sisyphus river where Cassia believes Ky may have grown up, and her family secretly helps her research into where Ky might have been taken.

== Reviews ==
Matched received a starred review from Kirkus Reviews, who praised Condie for "[peeling] back layer after dystopic layer at breakneck speed". The reviewers noted its similarity to The Giver but said it is "a fierce, unforgettable page-turner in its own right". Susan Carpenter of the Los Angeles Times called it a "wonderful debut", praising the way Condie used the style of writing to reflect Cassia's feelings. Darienne Hosley Stewart, reviewing for Common Sense Media, gave Matched four out of four stars, praising Condie for "[crafting] a fine addition to the genre" that was a "great coming-of-age story" rather than a "hand-wringing love triangle, or a ho-hum story of teen rebellion". She also thought the characters were "complex and surprising" and Cassia's awakening and understanding of the Society "[felt] authentic". The novel reached The New York Times bestseller's list in 2010 in the Children's category and Publishers Weekly named Matched one of the best children's books of 2010.

William Morris in BYU Studies Quarterly stated Matched's "lyrical prose and the complex way it dramatizes the key YA themes of courtship, rebellion, and control, and above all, the way it explores agency" set it apart from other YA literature.

== Themes ==
A key theme in Matched and throughout the trilogy is attunement to art, which is reinforced by Condie's poetic writing style. Dylan Thomas's poem "Do not go gentle into that good night" serves as an inspiration to Cassia in the novel and throughout the series. Furthermore, the novel deals with themes such as constraint versus freedom, order versus agency, isolation versus community, and family versus society. Another key theme in the series is very common when it comes to dystopian novels. It deals with rebellion versus government and even one fighting for freedom. Cassie's curiosity inspires the themes as she comes closer to revealing the truth.

== Film adaptation ==
In September 2010, Disney purchased the film rights to the Matched trilogy, before the book had been released. By 2011, originally, Adam Shankman and Jennifer Gibgot signed on to direct and produce the film, respectively. Early production began with Kieran and Michele Mulroney were hired as the screenwriters, and Jon M. Chu was in talks to direct instead of Shankman. It is unclear if this film will ever be released because of limited information .
