= Jona Frank =

American photographer

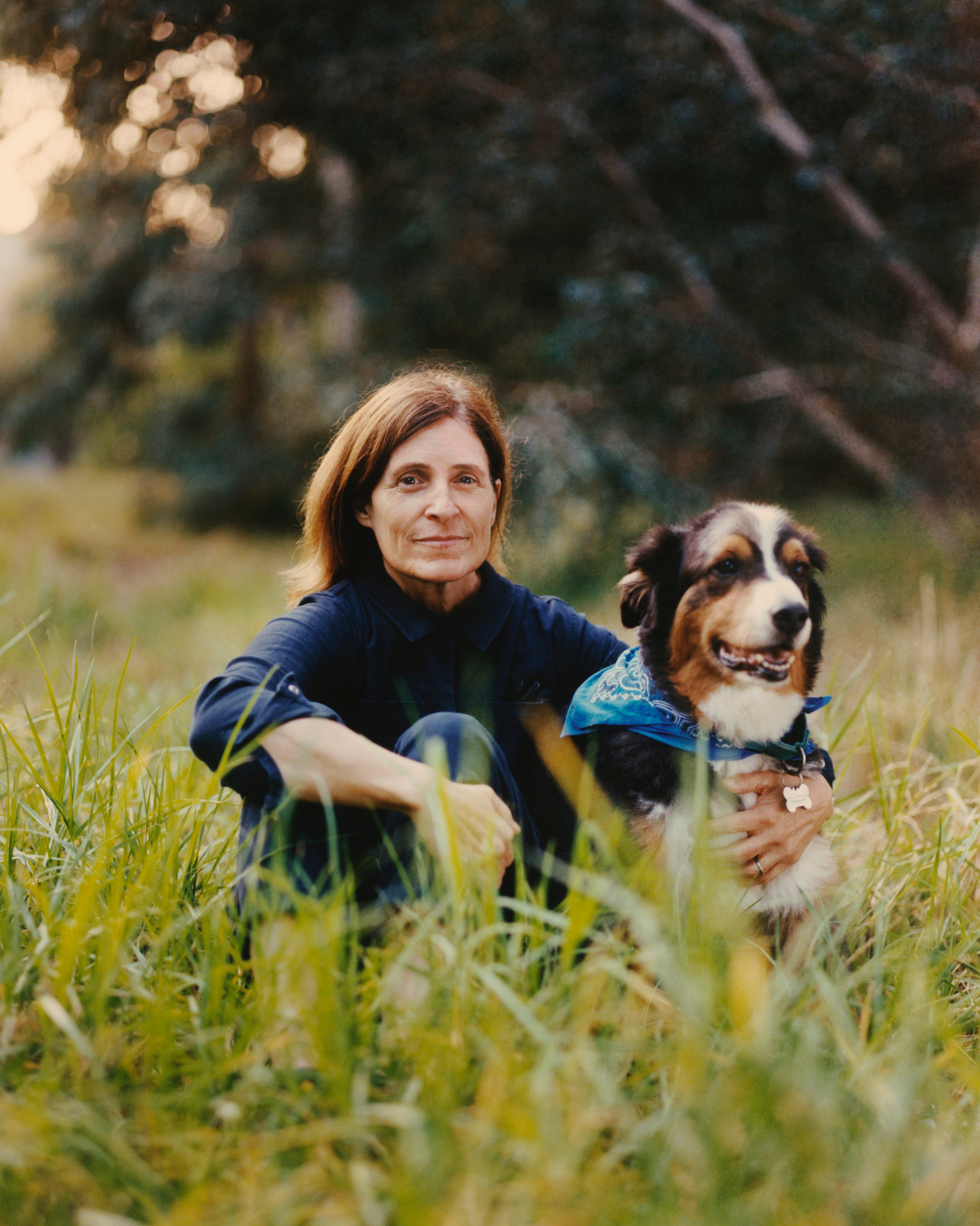
- Portrait of Frank with Shep
- Born: 1966 (age 59–60); Camden, New Jersey, U.S.
- Education: University of Southern California
- Known for: Photography
- Website: jonafrank.com

Jona Frank (born 1966) is an American portrait photographer living in Santa Monica, California. She has made work about youth culture, both from an outsider's perspective—High School (2004), Right (2008) and The Modern Kids (2015)—as well as about her own childhood—Cherry Hill (2020). Her work is held in the collections of the J. Paul Getty Museum, the Museum of Fine Arts, Houston and the San Francisco Museum of Modern Art.

== Early life and education ==
Frank was born in Camden, New Jersey and grew up in Cherry Hill, New Jersey. She is the youngest of four children and the only girl. "Frank's mother, a homemaker who hid her depression, prescribed rigid Catholicism and strict gender roles, insisting on Holly Hobbie wallpaper in her daughter's room and baking impeccable pies."

Frank studied English and earned a master's in film production at the University of Southern California, Los Angeles.

== Work ==
Frank's photobook High School (2004), on the hierarchies in American school life, "examined the different subcultures that teenagers try out as they're trying to formulate individual identities."

Right: Portraits from the Evangelical Ivy League (2008) examines Patrick Henry College, "an evangelical Christian school that was created to welcome the first generation of home-schooled teenagers into the university environment", youths with aspirations to become Republican politicians. "Frank also photographs a selection of the teenagers in the environments they grew up in. The book also contains examples of students' homework, interviews with students, and essays by Frank, curator Colin Westerbeck, and writer Hanna Rosin.

The Modern Kids (2015) contains portraits of boys and young men in amateur boxing gyms in the northwest of England, as well as some portraits of them with female partners. The work was made in three gyms over four years from 2010.

Cherry Hill: a Childhood Reimagined (2020) is a memoir in which Frank reconstructs scenes from her youth using staged photographs, a lavish set and production, costumes, props and wardrobe. A cast of actors—including Laura Dern—portray Frank's younger self and family members. Frank also includes autobiographical essays. According to Ayla Angelos writing for It's Nice That, "the exceptionally poised photographs elaborately allude to a young girl's struggle growing up in a stifling suburban dwelling." As described by Dana Goodyear in The New Yorker, "Frank documents her family's quiet implosion: her mother, deteriorating, would silently retreat to her room, in a pink robe, and emerge, pockets full of Kleenex; her beloved older brother, who hid his sexuality, had a psychotic breakdown."

== Publications ==
- High School. Los Angeles: Arenas Street, 2004. ISBN 978-0972995412.
- Right: Portraits from the Evangelical Ivy League. San Francisco: Chronicle, 2008. ISBN 978-0811889629. With essays by Frank, Colin Westerbeck and Hanna Rosin.
- The Modern Kids. Heidelberg, Germany: Kehrer, 2015. ISBN 978-3-86828-632-8. With an essay by Bruce Weber.
- Cherry Hill: a Childhood Reimagined. New York: Monacelli, 2020. ISBN 9781580935586. Photographs and text by Frank.

== Films ==
- Catholic School (1998)
- Between Classes (2000)
- Senior Portrait (2000)
- Baby Faced Assassin (2016) – short, about boxer Paul Butler

== Solo exhibitions ==
- Boys in Progress, DNJ Gallery, Santa Monica, CA, 2009
- Jona Frank: Model Home, Bowdoin College Museum of Art, Brunswick, Maine, February 24 – June 5, 2022

== Collections ==
Frank's work is held in the following permanent collections:

- J. Paul Getty Museum, Los Angeles, CA: 2 prints (as of 25 March 2022)
- Museum of Fine Arts, Houston, TX: 1 print (as of 25 March 2022)
- San Francisco Museum of Modern Art, San Francisco, CA: 3 prints (as of 25 March 2022)
- UCR/California Museum of Photography, College of Humanities, Arts, and Social Sciences at University of California, Riverside, CA: 16 prints (as of 25 March 2022)
