= Ally Condie =

American novelist

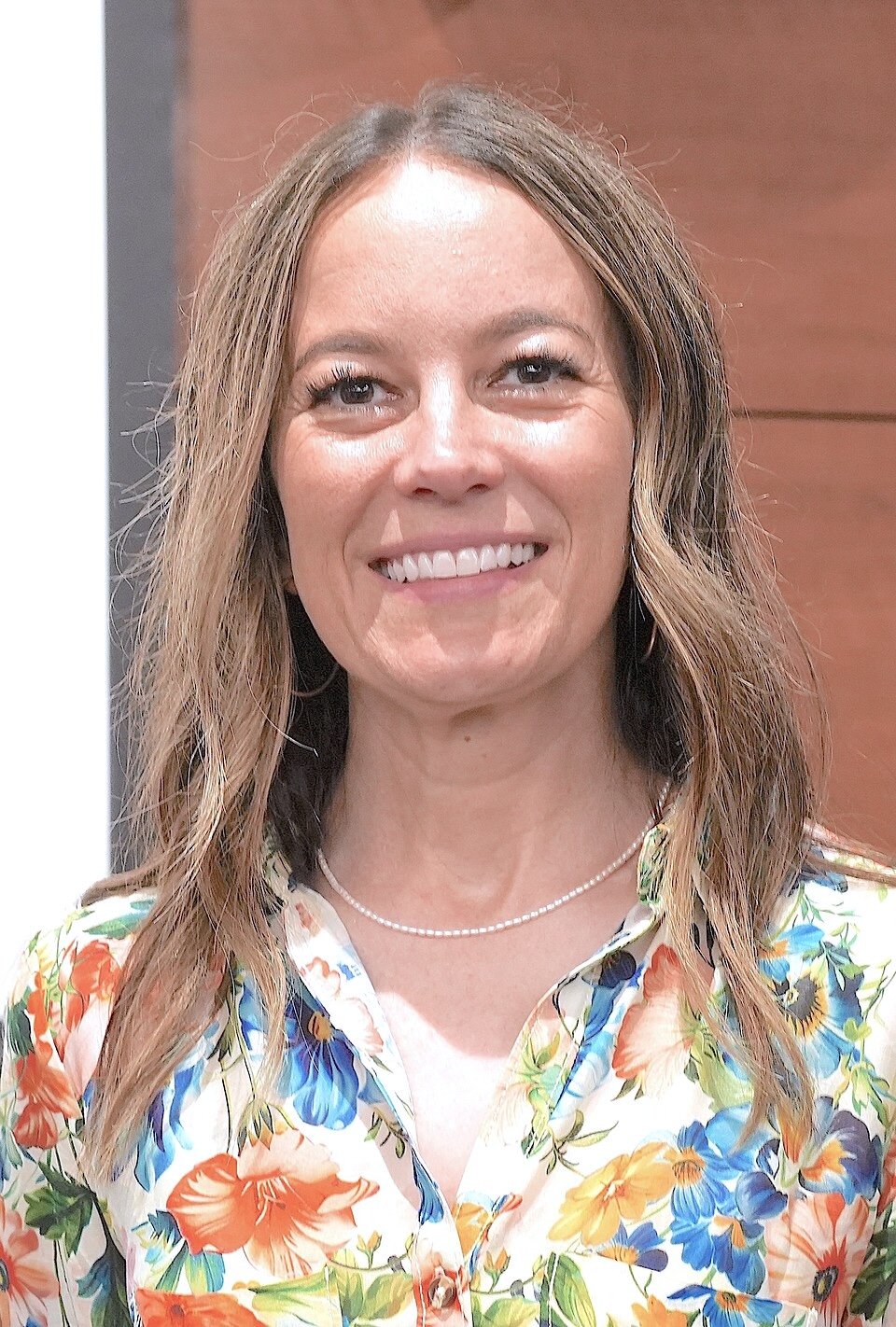
- Condie at 2025 LA Times Festival of Books
- Born: November 2, 1978 (age 47); Cedar City, Utah, U.S.
- Education: Brigham Young University (BA); Vermont College of Fine Arts (MFA)
- Occupations: Previous high school English teacher; Author
- Children: 3 sons and a daughter
- Writing career
- Genres: Dystopian fiction, children's literature, young adult fiction
- Notable work: Matched trilogy
- Website: allycondie.com

Allyson Braithwaite Condie (born November 2, 1978) is an author of young adult and middle grade fiction. Her novel Matched was a #1 New York Times and international bestseller, and spent over a year on the New York Times Bestseller List. The sequels (Crossed and Reached) are also New York Times bestsellers. Matched was chosen as one of YALSA's 2011 Teens' Top Ten and named as one of Publishers Weekly's Best Children's Books of 2010. All three books are available in 30+ languages.

Condie is also the author of the New York Times bestseller Atlantia (a standalone novel published in 2014) and Summerlost (a middle grade novel published in 2016). Summerlost was a finalist for the 2017 Edgar Award for Best Juvenile Mystery.

She is the founder and director of the WriteOut Foundation, a non-profit 501 (3) (c) foundation that runs writing camps for rural teens. She is also a member of the Yallwest Board, which is a non-profit California-based organization aimed at making books accessible to local children. Condie is also on the board of Go Jane Give, a non-profit Utah-based organization that organizes donations to refugees.

== Personal life ==
Condie was born in Cedar City, Utah. At the age of four, she told a series of original stories about a unicorn to her babysitter, who wrote them down for Condie. Once she could write, Condie kept a regular journal, as well as a poetry journal. Condie did not have much time for creative writing in high school, college, or her years as a high school English teacher. In high school, Condie ran cross country and track, and has maintained a love for distance running even today. Condie partially credits her interest in YA writing to her positive experience working with high schoolers, despite not writing much during her own time in high school. She wanted to become the kind of author she would have felt comfortable recommending her students read. Writing for adolescents came naturally to Condie because of her experience as a high school teacher, cross country and track coach, as a sorority mom, and especially since she herself enjoys reading YA literature.

She attended Brigham Young University and has an undergraduate degree in English Teaching. She taught high school English in Utah and in upstate New York. With the arrival of their first child, Condie quit teaching to raise a family. During this time away from school and work, she picked up writing again. Condie began publishing YA literature with Deseret Book Company, a small, Utah-based publisher. She published her first book in 2006, Yearbook, which was subsequently followed by the remaining two books in the Yearbook trilogy: First Day (2007) and Reunion (2008). The trilogy was followed by two stand-alone novels: Freshman for President (2008) and Being Sixteen (2010).

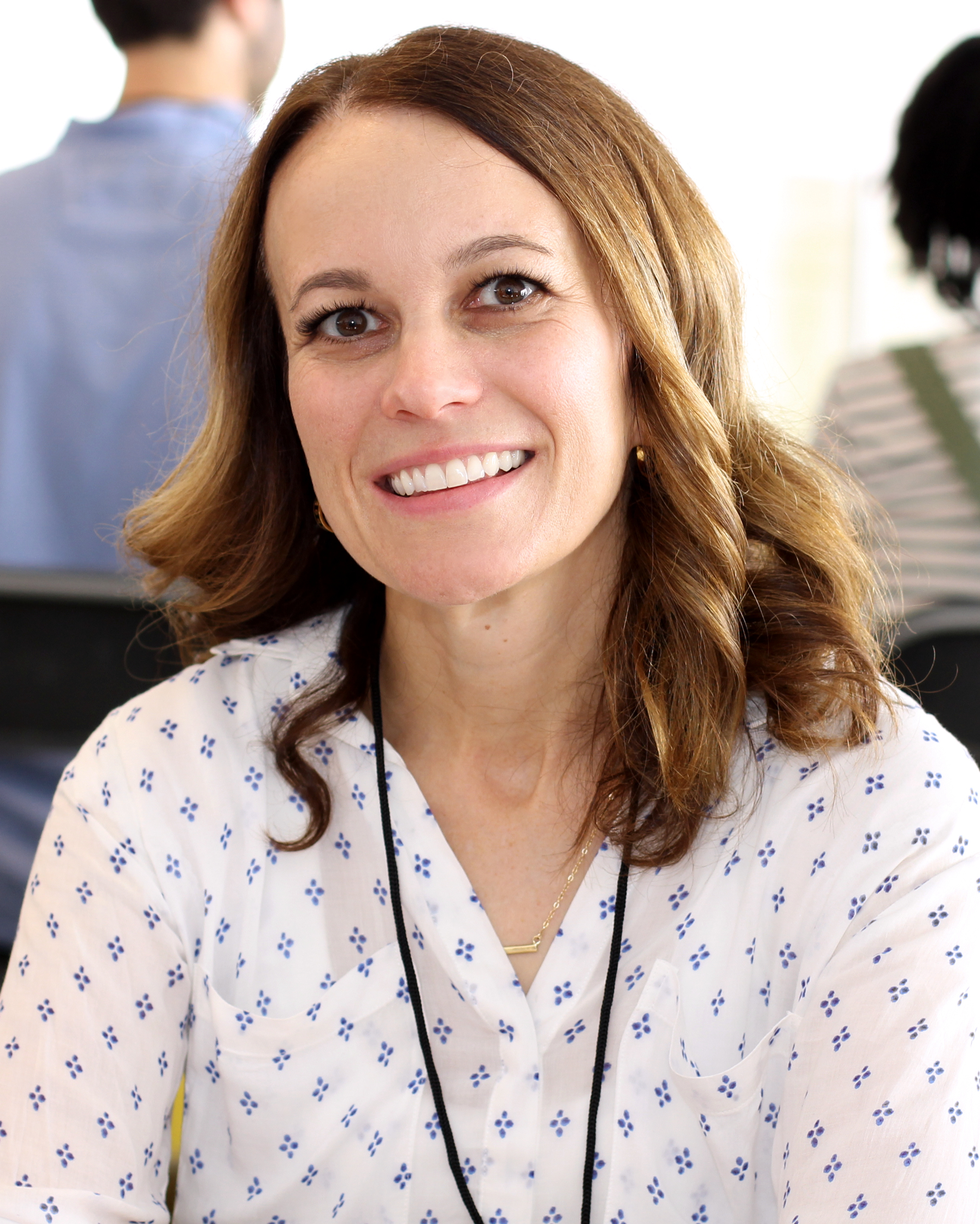
Condie at the 2018 Texas Book Festival

In 2017, she lived with her husband and four children in Pleasant Grove, Utah. The couple had three sons, the oldest of which had been diagnosed with autism in 2011. In 2012 the family had adopted a girl from China. Also in 2017, Condie graduated from Vermont College of Fine Arts with a Master's in Fine Arts Degree. Condie went through a divorce in 2019. She returned to her maiden name, Braithwaite, and struggled at first emotionally with the fact that her novels will continue to be published under the name of her Ex-Husband. She married her second husband, David, in August 2023. Condie is a member of the Church of Jesus Christ of Latter-day Saints (LDS Church). The Utah landscape and Mormon themes from her upbringing continue to influence her writing. While trying to come to terms with her divorce, Condie wrote her first adult novel, The Unwedding.

== Matched trilogy ==
The YA novel Matched was published by Dutton Penguin in November 2010 and reached number three on the Children's Chapter Books bestseller list in January. Condie took the manuscript for Matched to Penguin Random House, after being advised so from her director at Deseret Book, where it reached an international audience. The second book, Crossed, was published in November 2011, and Reached, published November 2012, completed the trilogy. The trilogy falls into the category of dystopian YA, which has increased in popularity for the modern YA audience.

== Summerlost ==
Condie's standalone novel, Summerlost, marked a transition for the novelist from YA to middle grade writing. Speaking on "Summerlost," (Dutton Children's Books, 2016) Condie mentions that the characters and the location of her novel were inspired by her own childhood in Cedar City, Utah. The fictional "Iron Creek" is inspired by "Coal Creek" in Cedar City.

== Works ==
=== Yearbook trilogy ===
- Yearbook (Deseret Book, 2006)
- First Day (Deseret, 2007)
- Reunion (Deseret, 2008)

=== Matched trilogy ===
- Matched (Dutton Penguin, 2010)
- Crossed (Dutton, 2011)
- Reached (Dutton, 2012)

=== The Darkdeep trilogy ===
This trilogy is written with Brendan Reichs

- The Darkdeep (2018)
- The Beast (2019)
- The Torchbearers (2020)

=== Standalone fiction ===
- Freshman for President (Deseret/Shadow Mountain, 2008), OCLC 797225716
- Being Sixteen (Deseret, 2010), OCLC 438052066
- Atlantia (Dutton, 2014)
- Summerlost (Dutton, 2016)
- The Last Voyage of Poe Blythe (Dutton, 2019)
- The Only Girl in Town (Dutton, 2023)
- The Unwedding (Grand Central, 2024)

=== Anthologies ===
- The Moms' Club Diaries: notes from a world of playdates, pacifiers, and poignant moments, compiled by Allyson Braithwaite Condie and Lindsay Hepworth (Provo, UT: Spring Creek, 2008), OCLC 190860066

=== Future works ===
At least one new novel from Ally Condie is planned, an untitled YA novel.

== See also ==
- List of dystopian literature
