= Imbolo Mbue =

American novelist (born 1981)

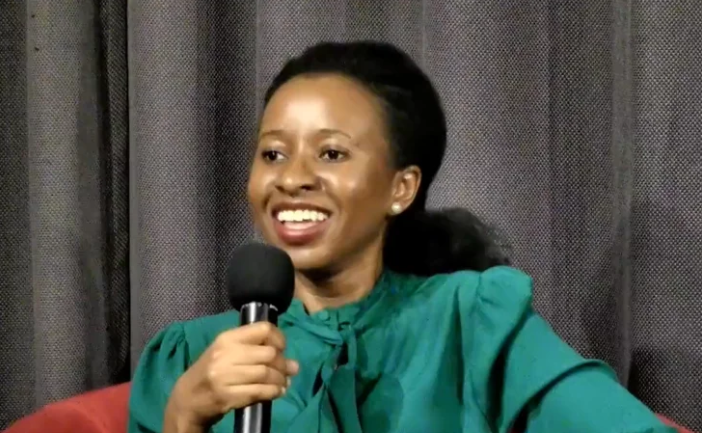
- Born: 1981 (age 44–45); Limbe, Cameroon
- Education: Rutgers University; Columbia University
- Occupations: Novelist, short story writer
- Writing career
- Notable work: Behold the Dreamers (2016)
- Notable awards: PEN/Faulkner Award for Fiction; Blue Metropolis Words to Change Award
- Website: imbolombue.com

Imbolo Mbue (born 1981) is a Cameroonian-American novelist and short story writer based in New York City. She is known for her debut novel Behold the Dreamers (2016), which garnered her the PEN/Faulkner Award for Fiction and the Blue Metropolis Words to Change Prize. Her works draw from her own experiences as an immigrant, as well as the experiences of other immigrants.

== Life and education ==
Mbue was born in 1981 in Limbé, Cameroon, in the English-speaking region of the country, where she was raised until her aunt sponsored her higher education studies in the United States.

Mbue came to the United States in 1998 to study business administration as an undergraduate student at Rutgers University. After graduating in 2002, she went on to complete her M.A. at Columbia University in 2006. She began to work in the corporate sector in New York City, but lost her job as did millions of Americans during the Great Recession.

After completing her undergraduate and graduate studies, she began a job doing market research for a media company, which she lost during the Great Recession. During this period of time, Mbue observed the difference in classes while walking through New York City, where she observed cab drivers who were predominantly black, waiting to drive executives. This formed the basis of her novel Behold the Dreamers (2016).

Mbue became an American citizen in 2014, and lives in New York City with her husband and children.

== Career ==
In 2014, she signed a million-dollar deal with Random House for her debut book Behold the Dreamers, which was published in 2016. The novel garnered critical acclaim for, according to NPR, the way it "depicts a country both blessed and doomed, on top of the world, but always at risk of losing its balance. It is, in other words, quintessentially American."

Mbue's writing, particularly Behold the Dreamers, seeks to explore topics regarding the complexity of American immigration policies, immigrant achievements, and the pursuit of the American Dream. According to Mbue, the characters' experiences and feelings are connected to her own: financial struggles, hopelessness, reevaluation of one's goals, and struggles as an immigrant. She has stressed the importance of literature providing empathy, which she feels is lacked in immigration policies and overall politics.

According to The Washington Post critic Ron Charles, as the book's release coincided with the 2016 United States presidential election and the anti-immigrant rhetoric from candidates and their supporters, the novel brought to light the "vast bureaucracy designed to wall off the American Dream from outsiders". In 2017, the novel was selected by Oprah Winfrey for her book club.

Mbue is a contributor to the anthology New Daughters of Africa (edited by Margaret Busby, 2019).

Mbue's 2021 novel How Beautiful We Were takes on environmental issues in Africa caused by corporate greed.

== Publications ==
=== Novels ===
- Behold the Dreamers, Random House, 2016, ISBN 978-0-8129-9848-1
  - Voici venir les rêveurs (French translation by Sarah Tardy), Éditions Belfond, 2016, ISBN 978-2-7144-7099-7
  - Das geträumte Land (German translation by Maria Hummitzsch), Kiepenheuer & Witsch, 2017, ISBN 978-3-4620-4796-7
- How Beautiful We Were, Random House, 2021, ISBN 978-0-5931-3242-5
  - Puissions-nous vivre longtemps (French translation by Catherine Gilbert), Éditions Belfond, 2021, ISBN 978-2-7144-9507-5
  - Wie schön wir waren (German translation by Maria Hummitzsch), Kiepenheuer & Witsch, 2021, ISBN 978-3-462-00484-7
- Every Story Is a Love Story, Random House, 2026, ISBN 979-8-217-15477-7

=== Short stories ===
Year	Title	First published	Reprinted/collected	Notes
2014	"Emke"	"Emke". The Threepenny Review (140). Winter 2015.		
2017	"A reversal"	"A reversal". Bakwa Magazine. November 13, 2017.	New Daughters of Africa (edited by Margaret Busby, 2019)	
2021	"The case for and against love potions"	"The case for and against love potions". The New Yorker. 97 (5): 54–61. March 22, 2021.		

== See also ==
- Nsah Mala
- John Nkemngong Nkengasong
