= Jade Chang =

Chinese-American journalist and writer

- Born: Ohio
- Education: Cornell University
- Occupations: Journalist, novelist
- Writing career
- Notable work: The Wangs vs. the World
- Website: thewangs.com

Jade Chang is a Chinese-American journalist and writer who lives in Los Angeles. Her debut novel, The Wangs vs. the World, was published in 2016 and was named to several autumn reading lists. She is the recipient of the VCU-Cabell First Novelist Prize.

== Personal life ==
Chang was born in Ohio and moved to the Los Angeles area (San Fernando Valley) with her family in 1985. Her parents had each separately emigrated from China to Taiwan in 1949, and later emigrated to the United States, where they met while attending graduate school. Chang has a younger sister, Krystal.

Chang majored in English literature and political philosophy at Cornell University, and moved back to Los Angeles after finding an internship at LA Weekly.

== Career ==
After graduating from college, Chang's first paying job was as a researcher for the J. Peterman Company. Afterwards, she worked as an arts journalist and editor while writing "her serious novel" at night. Chang also served as the West Coast editor for Metropolis and the young adult editor for the website Goodreads. She completed her first manuscript and submitted it to agents during the 2008 financial crisis. The first manuscript was never accepted, receiving "very encouraging nos, but they were nos nonetheless" as many were unsure of the future of publishing.

In late summer 2008, Chang attended a launch party for Trump Tower Dubai, held in a Bel Air mansion, as an editor for the luxury magazine Angeleno. During the party, she noted that Wolfgang Puck was creating and serving hors d'oeuvres dusted with 24-karat gold and guests were being serenaded by Christina Aguilera. While waiting for the valet to retrieve her car after the party, she found an iPod Touch in her gift bag and was inspired to write about the impending upheaval which manifested in the bankruptcy of Lehman Brothers a few weeks later: "We are about to collapse under the weight of our own excess ... [but] when the world falls apart, anything can happen. That's so scary, but it's also kind of electric and exciting, too."

Chang wrote The Wangs vs. the World over a period of five years after that party. When Chang submitted the unsolicited manuscript to Eddie Huang's literary agent, Marc Gerald, it was accepted and the publishing rights were put up for auction. Houghton Mifflin Harcourt won the bidding for the American rights, and made it their lead novel for October 2016. The novel was Helen Atsma's first acquisition for Houghton Mifflin Harcourt, who said it was the "rare novel that makes me both laugh out loud and cry." A TV series has been development with Hulu since early 2018.

In 2020, Chang wrote one episode for Netflix original series The Baby-Sitters Club, her first credited television work, "Claudia and Mean Janine" which focuses on Claudia learning her grandmother was forced to live in Manzanar, a detention camp for Japanese-Americans during World War II.

== Influences ==
Chang cites Gordon Korman's No Coins, Please as one of her favorite books from childhood which may have unconsciously influenced the road-trip structure of The Wangs.

== Bibliography ==
=== Books ===
- The Wangs vs. the World, 2016, ISBN 978-0-544-73409-8.
- The Good Immigrant, 2019, ISBN 978-0-316-52428-5.
- What a Time to Be Alive. Ecco Press. 2025-09-30. ISBN 978-0-06-341639-0.
