= Rebecca Soler =

American voice actress

- Other name: Jessica Paquet
- Education: Carnegie-Mellon University (BFA)
- Occupation: Voice actress
- Years active: 2003–present
- Spouse: Christopher L. Graves

Rebecca Soler (credited as Jessica Paquet) is an American voice actress based in the New York City area. She has voiced on several audiobooks; her most notable voice work has been the narrator for The Lunar Chronicles series by Marissa Meyer. In anime, she voiced title character Miu Nomura in Piano: The Melody of a Young Girl's Heart, Reanne in Ojamajo Doremi and Battia in Outlanders. In animation, she voiced in Huntik, Viva Piñata, and Winx Club. She has worked with 4Kids Entertainment, NYAV Post, Media Blasters, Central Park Media and DuArt Film & Video. On stage, she has participated in various theater projects, including a play called Becoming Cuba. She is also a producer of a web series called With Friends Like These.

== Biography ==
Soler grew up in Boston, and moved to Sugar Land, Texas while in high school. She attended Carnegie-Mellon University where she graduated with a Bachelor in Fine Arts degree in theater.

She got involved in voice-over for anime and animation works that were being dubbed in the New York area. She voiced lead characters in Huntik, Viva Piñata, Winx Club, Teenage Mutant Ninja Turtles, Pokémon and Chaotic. Soler began her voice acting as Joi Reynard from Teenage Mutant Ninja Turtles. She voiced Miu Nomura, the title character in Piano: The Melody of a Young Girl's Heart which was produced by NYAV Post and Right Stuf. She was selected in a fan casting contest poll held by Central Park Media to voice Battia in their dub of the 1986 anime Outlanders. Soler joined the Winx Club 4Kids dub cast, replacing Dani Schaffel in voicing the character Tecna for season 3.

She began working on audio books after her voice-over agent recommended her for a few projects. She voiced in books by Judy Blume, James Patterson, and Sarah Dessen, and received an AudioFile Earphones Award in 2009 for her narration of Amy Efaw's novel After. Her narration of the Sarah Dessen's Lock and Key was listed among 2009 YALSA Fabulous Films & Amazing Audiobooks for Young Adults. In January 2011, her narration of Marissa Meyer's book Cinder was released by MacMillan Audio.

Soler continues to be active on-screen and in the theater. In 2014, she was involved in a live-action play called Becoming Cuba by the Huntington Theatre Company where she played Martina. She is executive producer of a web series called With Friends Like These which is written by and stars her husband. In 2020, her daughter was born.

== Filmography ==
=== Animation ===
List of voice performances in animation
Year	Title	Role	Notes	Source
2003	Teenage Mutant Ninja Turtles	Joi Reynard		
2006–07	Viva Piñata	Ella Elephanilla, Simone Cinnamonkey		
2006–07, 2016, 2019	Winx Club	Tecna (Season 3), Stella (Seasons 7-8)	4Kids English dub; Season 3 DuArt Film and Video English dub; Season 7 3Beep Inc. English dub; Season 8	
2006–10	Chaotic	Sarah		
2009–2012	Huntik	Sophie Casterwill		
2009	Turtles Forever	1987 April O'Neil		
2013–14	The Crumpets	Triceps, Blister, Ohoh, Aunt Harried	Distribimage version	
2016–17	World of Winx	Stella		
2018	Pinkalicious & Peterrific	Mayor Martinez	2018-22	
2018	Nella the Princess Knight	Queen Mom, others		

=== Anime ===
List of dubbing performances in anime
Year	Title	Role	Notes	Source
2005	Piano: The Melody of a Young Girl's Heart	Miu Nomura		
2005	Magical DoReMi	Reanne Griffith		
2005–2020	Pokémon	Rhoda, Rhonda, Mamie, Linda, Nanette, Professor Carolina, Alexa, Celosia, Mallow		
2006	Pokémon: Lucario and the Mystery of Mew	Kidd Summers	Credited under Featuring	
2006	Outlanders	Battia	Central Park Media version	
2007	Ikki Tousen: Dragon Destiny	Shimei Ryoumou, Koumei Shokatsuryou, others		
2007	Ah! My Goddess: Flights of Fancy	Kodama	Ep. "Ah! The Love of a Goddess Saves the Ninja!"	
2011–2015	Yu-Gi-Oh! ZEXAL	Kari Tsukumo, Hart Tenjo, Summer		

=== Video games ===
List of voice performances in video games
Year	Title	Voice role	Source
2010	Red Dead Redemption	Miranda Fortuna	
2011	Star Wars: The Old Republic	Additional voices	

=== Live acting ===
- Once a Loser (2013 short film) – Coffee woman
- With Friends Like These (2014 web series) – Jess (Ep. 5)

=== Crew and production roles ===
- With Friends Like These (2014 web series) – Executive Producer

== Discography ==
=== Audio books ===
The Empyrean series by Rebecca Yarros

- Fourth Wing
- Iron Flame
- Onyx Storm

Once Upon a Broken Heart series by Stephanie Garber

- Once upon a Broken Heart
- The Ballad of the Never After
- A Curse for True Love

The Caraval series by Stephanie Garber

- Caraval
- Legendary
- Finale

The Lunar Chronicles series by Marissa Meyer

- Cinder
- Scarlet
- Cress – Audio Publishers Association Audie Award Finalist in Fantasy and Teens categories – 2015
- Fairest
- Winter

Renegades series by Marissa Meyer

- Renegades narrated by Rebecca Soler and Dan Bittner
- Archenemies narrated by Rebecca Soler and Dan Bittner
- Supernova narrated by Rebecca Soler and Dan Bittner

Other books

- Lock and Key by Sarah Dessen
- The Truth About Forever by Sarah Dessen
- Virtue Falls by Christina Dodd
- Angel: A Maximum Ride Novel by James Patterson
- Nevermore: The Final Maximum Ride Adventure by James Patterson
- Atlantia by Ally Condie
- Echo by Pam Muñoz Ryan, narrated by Mark Bramhall, David de Vries, MacLeod Andrews and Rebecca Soler. – 2016 Honor Audiobook Odyssey Award
- Heartless by Marissa Meyer
- Sadie by Courtney Summers, narrated by Rebecca Soler, Fred Berman, Dan Bittner, Gabra Zackman
- Cheshire Crossing by Andy Weir
- Let It Glow by Joanne Levy and Marissa Meyer narrated by Gabi Epstein, Rebecca Soler.
