= We Could Be Magic =

2025 graphic novel by Marissa Meyer

- Date: June 3, 2025
- Publisher: Feiwel & Friends

Creative team
- Writer: Marissa Meyer
- Artist: Joelle Murray
- ISBN: 978-1250379399

We Could Be Magic is a 2025 graphic novel written by Marissa Meyer and illustrated by Joelle Murray. It follows a teenage girl named Tabitha who aspires to portray a princess at the famous Sommerland theme park.

== Plot ==
When her parents divorced, six-year-old Tabitha "Tabi" Laurie's dad brought her to the Disneyland-esque Sommerland, where she met a performer portraying her favorite character, Princess Madeline. She asks the Madeline actress if she will love her boyfriend Prince Henry forever, to which she replies yes. Inspired by the experience, a teenage Tabi joins a 12-week summer program at Sommerland, hoping to play a princess herself.

Tabi receives a temporary role before princess auditions, which ends up being running the nacho stand. At a party before her first day, her roommate Kyra introduces her to Ingrith, a performer for Madeline, who makes fatphobic comments and dismisses Tabi's desire to portray a princess by saying she should settle for being a costumed mascot performer. While trying to find someone else to talk to at the party she bumps into James, a character attendant who helps manage character meet-and-greets, and the two hit it off.

At auditions, Tabi struggles to perform a dance routine and is dismissed, while Kyra is chosen to play Princess Aditi. Over the coming days, Tabi continues practicing for the next audition. A meet-and-greet for Madeline and Henry moves near the nacho stand, with James being their attendant, and Tabi develops a crush on Prince Henry's actor Brent. One day after her shift, James brings Tabi on a tour around the park. He tells her about how Winda Sommers, the creator of Sommerland and its characters, sometimes covertly watches parades from one of the buildings.

After a second audition, Tabi is assigned to be a costumed performer for Kitty Wise, Princess Madeline's magical cat sidekick. Her first day goes terribly, with an apathetic character attendant and low guest turnout. However, the following day James becomes her new attendant, and the two are able to turn things around. One day after her shift, she runs into Ingirth, who tells her Brent was only using her for free nachos and reveals that James used to play a prince before punching a guest for harassing a princess performer. She again belittles Tabi's dream of playing a princess, stating they do not make princess outfits in her size.

On the day of one of Sommerland's parades, Kyra reveals that Ingrith and Brent quit after Madeline's float's position in the parade was changed. With no one left to portray their characters in the parade, Kyra, Tabi, and James scheme to have Tabi play Princess Madeline and James play Prince Henry. Despite the knowledge that this could get them fired for violating the park's strict character code, they go through with the plan, with Tabi wearing a cape to hide that the back of her costume does not completely zip up. When the parade ends, park operator Barbara prepares to fire Tabi and James, but Winda Sommers arrives. She tells Tabi that her actions have inspired her, and Tabi and James are able to keep their job with one week's probation.

In the epilogue, it is revealed Winda Sommers made a new movie with a princess named Bellerose who looks like Tabi and that Tabi is now portraying the character in the park.

== Reception ==
Kirkus Reviews stated that although We Could Be Magic had "very quick pacing, the storytelling is strong." They further commented on the book's portrayal of body positivity. Publishers Weekly described the art as having "fairy tale vibes," and concluded the book was a "cozy and appropriately swoony read." Karin Greenberg of School Library Journal described the book as a "sweet, wholesome story about dreams, self-esteem, motivation, and pushing back against societal norms."

The Young Adult Library Services Association included We Could Be Magic in the 2026 editions of Quick Picks For Reluctant Young Adult Readers and Great Graphic Novels for Teens. Across two different reviews for the book, they compared the work to Cheer Up: Love and Pompoms, Roaming, Dumplin', and Lunar New Year Love Story.
