= Winter (Meyer novel) =

Science fiction novel by Marissa Meyer

- Book cover of Winter
- Author: Marissa Meyer
- Language: English
- Series: The Lunar Chronicles
- Genre: Young adult, romance, science fiction, dystopian
- Publisher: Feiwell & Friends
- Publication date: November 10, 2015
- Publication place: United States
- Media type: Print (hardcover and paperback), audiobook, e-book
- Pages: 827
- ISBN: 978-0-312-64298-3
- OCLC: 874726597
- LC Class: PZ7.M571737 Wi 2015
- Preceded by: Cress

Winter is a 2015 young adult science fiction novel written by American author Marissa Meyer and published by Macmillan Publishers through their subsidiary Feiwel & Friends. It is the fourth and final book in The Lunar Chronicles series and the sequel to Cress. The story is loosely based on the fairy tale of "Snow White", similar to its predecessors Cinder, Scarlet and Cress which were loosely based on "Cinderella", "Little Red Riding Hood" and "Rapunzel" respectively. It was a USA Today and Wall Street Journal bestselling novel.

== Plot ==
Despite having scars on her face, Princess Winter is known for her stunning beauty and kindness. Her relationship with her stepmother Levana is strained at best. When Winter refuses to marry the queen's thaumaturge Aimery, Levana orders Jacin to murder Winter. Instead, he stabs Winter's favorite pet, a wolf named Ryu, so Winter can escape unharmed and Queen Levana will believe she is dead. Jacin gives Scarlet a pod key and a knife and tells her to flee to RM9, Wolf's home Sector. The Crew sneaks onto a ship owned by Levana's fiancé Emperor Kai, who is secretly part of the plan to overthrow Queen Levana.

Once on RM9, Cinder, Thorne, Iko, and Wolf take refuge with Maha, Wolf's mother. They break into a control room and Cinder hacks to display her video proclaiming herself to be Princess Selene and asking for the people to become her army. Levana finds her and sends her guards and thaumaturges to RM9. In the confrontation, Cinder gives herself up, Wolf is taken, and Maha is murdered by Aimery for having housed them.

Jacin finds out he is in trouble for not killing Winter. He tells Cress it is time to leave, and they maneuver through train tunnels. Scarlet and Winter go to find the wolf-like mutations of human soldiers in an attempt to convince them to join Cinder's army.

During Cinder's trial, Cinder announces that she is Princess Selene, and Levana is a traitor to the crown for trying to murder her as a baby. During the ensuing battle, Cinder dives off the tower into the lake. Her systems are damaged and she almost drowns but is saved by Thorne and Jacin. Levana, in a bid to quell the uprising from the disastrous trial, announces Cinder is dead with a fake body to prove it.

Scarlet and Winter find the wolf soldiers. The soldiers decide to join them and go topside to find supporters to rally. Once arriving in a lumber sector, an old crone, who is Levana in disguise, offers Winter a sour-apple petite, Winter's favorite candy. However, the petite is laced with a strain of the letumosis plague, and Winter faints. Scarlet and several of the soldiers are also infected. Winter is put into a suspension tank. During Levana's coronation, Cinder, Jacin and Iko break into the labs, steal the letumosis cure, and grab Winter out of suspension.

Cinder starts a revolution. Cress opens the gates and a mob storms the palace. Levana has just been crowned empress when Wolf attacks her and Cinder's message distracts everyone. Cinder finds Levana in the throne room, with Thorne tied up by the balcony. Levana demands Cinder relinquish all claims to the throne or she kills Thorne. Still being controlled by Levana, Thorne stabs Cress in the stomach and Cinder in the thigh. Levana feigns penance, then stabs Cinder in the chest, who in turn shoots her. Levana dies, while Cinder survives due to being a cyborg.

Wolf and Scarlet reaffirm their feelings for each other. Thorne and Cress officially become a couple. Jacin kisses a recovering Winter awake. Cinder agrees to sign the Treaty of Bremen with Earth and is crowned Queen of Luna.

== Development ==
Winter took Meyer two years to complete and at times she thought that she "would never be finished" and that she "would be stuck in this book for the rest of my life." Part of the reason for this was due to Meyer putting the book to the side while she worked on the novel Fairest, which she wanted to work on in order to further develop the character of Levana.

While the character of Winter was initially planned to physically resemble the typical image of Snow White, she chose to make her black after seeing a photo of a "beautiful black model biting into a red apple" and thinking "That’s her! That’s my princess!"

== Reception ==
Critical reception has been positive and Winter has received positive reviews from the School Library Journal and Publishers Weekly. Booklist gave Winter a favorable review, praising Meyer for inserting "just enough veiled references to the original stories to spur intellectual and emotional connections."
