= Dumplin' (film) =

- Film poster
- Directed by: Anne Fletcher
- Screenplay by: Kristin Hahn
- Based on: Dumplin' by Julie Murphy
- Produced by: Michael Costigan; Kristin Hahn; Trish Hofmann; Mohamed AlRafi
- Starring: Danielle Macdonald; Jennifer Aniston; Odeya Rush; Maddie Baillio; Bex Taylor-Klaus; Luke Benward; Dove Cameron
- Cinematography: Elliot Davis
- Edited by: Emma E. Hickox
- Music by: Jake Monaco
- Production companies: Echo Films; COTA Films
- Distributed by: Netflix
- Release date: December 7, 2018 (United States)
- Running time: 110 minutes
- Country: United States
- Language: English
- Budget: $13 million
- Box office: $399,189

Dumplin' is a 2018 American coming-of-age comedy drama film directed by Anne Fletcher and written by Kristin Hahn. It is based on the 2015 novel by Julie Murphy. The film stars Danielle Macdonald as Willowdean "Dumplin'" Dickson, Jennifer Aniston as her mother, Rosie Dickson, and Odeya Rush as her best friend, Ellen Dryver.

== Plot ==
Willowdean Dickson grows up in a small Texas town, raised primarily by her Aunt Lucy. Her mother Rosie – who calls her "Dumplin’", much to Will’s chagrin – is a former beauty queen, too committed to various pageants to spend time with her daughter, and remains the planner of the town's annual Miss Teen Bluebonnet Pageant.

Lucy introduces Will to Ellen Dryver, who becomes her best friend. Six months before they start their final year of high school, Lucy dies. Rosie finds difficulty connecting with Will, who often feels judged about her weight and is embarrassed by her mother's pageant world.

On the first day of school, as Will is being dropped off by Rosie, everyone hears Rosie call her Dumplin, which results in being made fun of by students. Will is suspended for defending another plus-size girl, Millie Mitchellchuck, from a bully. Will accuses Rosie of resenting her for her looks, and is upset when Rosie states Lucy should have taken better care of her health. After finding Lucy's application for the Miss Teen Bluebonnet Pageant when she was 16, Will enters the pageant as an act of "protest in heels". Ellen signs up as well, along with the enthusiastic Millie and their classmate Hannah Perez, an edgy feminist.

Rosie interprets Will's application as a mockery of the pageant, and warns her that pageants are harder than she thinks. Will becomes jealous when Ellen warms to the pageant and the other contestants, and they quarrel after she tells her to quit.

Bo, who works with Will at the local diner, asks her out to watch a meteor shower. They kiss, but she panics when he innocently touches her back, and leaves abruptly. She feels further alienated when Rosie mentors Bekah Colter, the pageant frontrunner, who plans to ask Bo to the Sadie Hawkins dance.

After finding a flyer for a bar’s Dolly Parton-themed drag show Lucy frequented, Will takes Millie and Hannah to it. There she meets drag queen Lee Wayne, who was a close friend of Lucy’s.

During the pageant talent tryouts, Will's choice to perform a magic trick goes poorly. Bo confesses his feelings for Will, having declined to go with Bekah to the dance, but she is quick to question his attraction; hurt, he accuses her of caring too much about what others think.

Grappling with her insecurities, Will is finally able to revisit the childhood playroom she shared with Ellen and Lucy. Rediscovering a special brooch among Lucy’s belongings, Will is inspired to take the pageant seriously, and she, Millie, and Hannah are coached by Lee and friends.

At the preliminary pageant event, Rosie is impressed by Will's speech about loyalty, which leads Will and Ellen to repair their friendship. At home, Rosie and Will reconcile over memories of Lucy, and Rosie regrets asking Will to donate Lucy’s things, having given “too much of her away”.

At the pageant, Millie is confronted by her mother for lying about entering the competition, but Millie stands firm. Will incorporates a Dolly Parton tribute into her magic act, to the joy of the audience and her mother; Millie’s performance is also a success. While Rosie is overwhelmed with pride, Will admits she is disqualified for unapproved changes to her costume and song and knows her mom can't make an exception for her daughter.

When Ellen's boyfriend is unable to escort her for the formalwear presentation, Rosie suggests Will do so, allowing them to complete the pageant together. Bekah wins the pageant as expected, but Millie is awarded first runner-up, while Will leaves to reconcile with Bo, and they share another kiss. The movie ends as Will and her friends take Rosie and Millie's mother to the bar where Aunt Lucy brought so much joy.

== Cast ==
- Danielle Macdonald as Willowdean "Dumplin'" Dickson, Rosie's daughter
- Jennifer Aniston as Rosie Dickson, Willow's beauty pageant queen mother
- Odeya Rush as Ellen "Elle" Dryver
- Maddie Baillio as Millie Mitchellchuck
- Bex Taylor-Klaus as Hannah Perez
- Luke Benward as Bo Larson
- Georgie Flores as Callie Reyes
- Dove Cameron as Bekah Colter
- Harold Perrineau as Lee Wayne / Rhea Ranged
- Kathy Najimy as Mrs. Mitchellchuck
- Ginger Minj as Candee Disch
- Hilliary Begley as Lucy Dickson
- Sam Pancake as Dale
- Dan Finnerty as Eugene Reed
- Molly McNearney as Delia Shepherd
- Tian Richards as Marcus
- Ryan Dinning as Patrick
- Andrew Fletcher as Tim

Dumplin' author Julie Murphy makes a cameo as a patron at the drag bar.

== Production ==
On March 15, 2017, Jennifer Aniston was announced in the cast of Dumplin', playing Rosie Dickson, the mother of Dumplin'. On June 13, 2017 Danielle Macdonald joined Aniston, in the lead role. On August 15, 2017, Odeya Rush was also cast in the film to play Ellen "El" Dryver, Willowdean's best friend, who creates difficulties when she tries to enter the beauty pageant along with Will. On August 21, 2017, Dove Cameron, Luke Benward, Bex Taylor-Klaus, Maddie Baillio, Georgie Flores, and Ginger Minj joined the cast of Dumplin'.

Principal photography on the film began on August 21, 2017, in Covington, Georgia and ended in October.

== Release ==
In September 2018, Netflix acquired distribution rights to the film. Dumplin' was released on December 7, 2018 on the platform.

== Reception ==
On the review aggregator website Rotten Tomatoes, Dumplin' holds an approval rating of 86% based on 64 reviews, with an average rating of 6.6/10. The website's critical consensus reads, "Elevated by a solid soundtrack and a terrific cast, Dumplin' offers sweetly uplifting drama that adds just enough new ingredients to a reliably comforting formula." On Metacritic, the film has a weighted average score of 53 out of 100, based on 16 critics, indicating "mixed or average" reviews.

== Accolades ==
| Award | Date of ceremony | Category | Recipient(s) and nominee(s) | Result | Ref(s) |
|---|---|---|---|---|---|
| Critics' Choice Awards | January 13, 2019 | Best Song | Dolly Parton and Linda Perry for "Girl in the Movies" | Nominated | |
| Georgia Film Critics Association | January 12, 2019 | Best Original Song | Dolly Parton and Linda Perry for "Girl in the Movies" | Nominated | |
| Golden Globe Awards | January 6, 2019 | Best Original Song | Dolly Parton and Linda Perry for "Girl in the Movies" | Nominated | |
| Grammy Awards | January 26, 2020 | Best Song Written for Visual Media | Dolly Parton and Linda Perry for "Girl in the Movies" | Nominated | |
| Guild of Music Supervisors Awards | February 13, 2019 | Best Song/Recording Created for a Film | Dolly Parton and Linda Perry for "Girl in the Movies" | Nominated | |
| Guild of Music Supervisors Awards | February 13, 2019 | Best Music Supervision for Films Budgeted Under $25 Million | Buck Damon | Nominated | |
| Hollywood Music in Media Awards | November 14, 2018 | Best Original Song – Feature Film | Dolly Parton and Linda Perry for "Girl in the Movies" | Nominated | |

== Soundtrack ==
The soundtrack, released on November 30, 2018, features songs either written or recorded by country star Dolly Parton. Parton performs on every song on the album and wrote six of the 12 tracks exclusively for the film, with the remaining six being re-recordings of some of Parton's earlier hits, including a string version of "Jolene". Joining Parton on the soundtrack are Elle King, Miranda Lambert, Mavis Staples, Alison Krauss, Rhonda Vincent, Sia, Macy Gray, Willa Amai and the film's stars Aniston and Macdonald.
