= Faith Herbert =

Zephyr

Publication information
- Publisher: Valiant Entertainment
- First appearance: Harbinger #1 (January 1992)
- Created by: Jim Shooter; David Lapham

In-story information
- Alter ego: Faith Herbert
- Team affiliations: Harbinger Renegades, Unity
- Abilities: Flight; Companion field Telekinesis

Faith Herbert, also known as Zephyr, is a fictional superhero, who has appeared in various series published by Valiant Comics. Created by writer Jim Shooter and David Lapham, she is a member of the Harbinger Renegades who appear primarily in Valiant's Harbinger series, as well as a major influence in the larger Valiant Universe.

She first appeared in Harbinger #1 (January 1992). Faith starred in her first solo limited series in April 2016 which was followed by solo ongoing series which ran from July 2016 to June 2017.

== Fictional character biography ==
After losing her parents in a car crash at a young age, Faith Herbert was raised by her loving grandmother. The young Faith found solace in the fantasy worlds her parents had once shared with her – comic books, science-fiction movies, the TV shows of Joss Whedon, and nerd fandom filled her life. Eventually, Faith thought she had found the secret to becoming a real superhero when she was approached by the Harbinger Foundation. There Faith met Peter Stanchek, another powerful psiot the Foundation had recently recruited. Utilizing his ability to activate other latent psiots, Peter unlocked the potential within Faith, giving her the ability to fly. She is the founder of the Harbinger Resistance.

== Powers and abilities ==
Flight, plus the ability to generate a companion field around nearby people and objects, carrying them telekinetically along her flight path. Recently she's delved into utilizing it in a psychokinetic fashion such as for shielding, a battering ram, and manipulating internal mechanisms, e.g., unlocking a door or moving people/objects around without physical contact.

== Publication history ==
In January 1992, Faith first appeared in Harbinger #1. Faith also appeared again in the Harbinger series after the 2012 reboot.

=== Solo comic series ===
In 2016, Jody Houser began writing the first solo series about Faith. PBS highlighted that Faith "sold out five times in its limited-run series, a significant feat in the comic book industry" which led to Valiant launching an ongoing series starring Faith, with Houser as the writer, in July 2016. NPR's review stated that "Houser has accomplished something deceptively simple: she's made Faith a fun character to spend time with. Faith is lighthearted but virtuous, with a cheesy sense of humor, compassion and smarts". In 2017, Faith (2016) was nominated for the "Best New Series" Eisner Award.

Houser went on to write two sequel limited series: Faith & The Future Force (2017) and Faith: Dreamside (2018). Faith also appeared in the one-shot Faith's Winter Wonderland Special #1 (December 2017) written by Marguerite Sauvage with art by Francis Portela and M.J. Kim.

=== Prose series ===
In 2020, Faith's origin story was retold in the young adult prose novel Faith: Taking Flight by Julie Murphy. Murphy stated that "Faith doesn't present as queer in the comics, but it didn't feel like a leap for me to write her as queer/questioning as a young adult. First off, she's in high school – who in high school isn't questioning absolutely every thing? [...] So that was an aspect of Faith I was really excited to write and something I was glad to know that the team at Valiant was also open to". The sequel, Faith: Greater Heights by Murphy, was published in November 2021.

== Accolades ==
=== Awards ===
Year	Award	Category	Media nominated	Result	Ref
2016	Diamond Gem Awards	Best Comic Book of the Year	Faith #1 (Ongoing)	Nominated	
2016	Diamond Gem Awards	Best New Comic Book Series	Faith – Valiant Entertainment	Nominated	
2016	Diamond Gem Awards	Reprint TP or HC of the Year	Faith TPB Volume 1: Hollywood & Vine	Nominated	
2016	YALSA Quick Picks	For Reluctant Young Adult Readers	Faith TPB Volume 1: Hollywood & Vine	Nominated	
2017	Eisner Awards	Best New Series	Faith – Valiant Entertainment	Won	

=== Lists ===
- Faith was named one of The 16 Best Comics of 2016 by Nerdist.
- Faith was named one of The 7 best new comics of 2016 by Vox.
- Faith was named one of The 14 Best Comics Of 2016 by Uproxx.
- Faith was named one of The 7 Best Comics & Graphic Novels of 2016 by Barnes & Noble.
- The Faith #1 (ongoing series) Kevin Wada cover was the years' best cover on the Vulture list of The 10 Best Comic-Book Covers of 2016.
- Faith Vol. 1: Hollywood and Vine TPB was named one of the Best of 2016 by the Everett Public Library system
- Faith Vol. 1: Hollywood and Vine TPB was named one of the Best Comics & Graphics Novels of 2016 by Amazon

== Collected editions ==
=== Comics ===
	Title	Material collected	Pages	Publication date	ISBN
Trade paperback
1	Hollywood and Vine	Faith Vol. 1 #1–4	112	July 2016	978-1682151211
2	California Scheming	Faith Vol. 2 #1–4	112	November 2016	978-1682151631
3	Superstar	Faith Vol. 2 #5–8	128	May 2017	978-1682151990
4	The Faithless	Faith Vol. 2 #9–12	128	August 2017	978-1682152195
5	Faith & The Future Force	Faith & The Future Force #1–4	112	December 2017	978-1682152331
6	Faith: Dreamside	Faith: Dreamside #1–4	112	February 2019	978-1682152973
Hardback
1	Faith: Hollywood & Vine Deluxe Edition	Faith Vol. 1 #1–4 and Harbinger: Faith #0	160	March 2017	978-1682152010
2	Faith Deluxe Edition Book 1	Faith Vol. 1 #1–4, Harbinger: Faith #0, Faith Vol. 2 #1–8 and A&A: The Adventures of Archer & Armstrong #5	368	December 2018	978-1682152850

=== Novels ===
	Title	Author	Publisher	Publication date	ISBN
1	Faith: Taking Flight	Julie Murphy	HarperCollins	July 2020	978-0062899668
2	Faith: Greater Heights	Julie Murphy	HarperCollins	November 2021	978-0062899682

== In other media ==
In June 2018, Sony Pictures announced a film adaptation of Faith with Maria Melnik hired to pen the script; this was to be part of a larger series of film adaptations of the Valiant Universe. Slashfilm commented that "screenwriter Eric Heisserer seemed to indicate that Faith might pop up in the developing Harbinger before she gets her own movie". However, Sony subsequently sold the rights to the Valiant Universe to Paramount Pictures in 2019. In February 2022, Deadline reported that Wes Ball was to direct a Harbinger film written by Andrew Lanham.
