= The Lunar Chronicles =

Fantasy literature series by Marissa Meyer

- Cinder (2012); Scarlet (2013); Cress (2014); Fairest (2015); Winter (2015); Stars Above (2015)
- Author: Marissa Meyer
- Country: United States
- Language: English
- Genre: Fantasy, young adult fiction, romance, science fiction, dystopian
- Publisher: Feiwel & Friends
- Published: 2012–2015
- Media type: Print (hardcover and paperback), audiobook, e-book
- No. of books: 6
- Website: lunarchronicles.universeofmarissameyer.com

The Lunar Chronicles is a series of four young adult science fiction novels, a novella, and a short story collection written by American author Marissa Meyer and published by Feiwel & Friends. Each book entails a science fictional twist on a classic fairy tale, including "Cinderella", "Little Red Riding Hood", "Rapunzel", and "Snow White". Set in a futuristic world inhabited by various species and creatures, tensions are rising between Earth and its former colony Luna, while both attempt to manage an ongoing pandemic.

An animated feature film adaptation, to be produced by Warner Bros. Pictures Animation and Locksmith Animation and distributed by Warner Bros. Pictures, was announced in 2019 and will release on November 3, 2028.

== Books ==
=== Cinder ===
Cinder is the first book in The Lunar Chronicles and second chronologically. It was published on January 3, 2012.

Linh Cinder (based on "Cinderella"), a cyborg living with her stepmother and her two stepsisters in New Beijing of the Eastern Commonwealth, works as a mechanic in a booth at the marketplace where she meets Crown Prince Kaito, who requests that she fix his personal former tutor android. After Cinder's younger stepsister, Peony, comes into contact with Letumosis, a plague taken place throughout the series, Cinder is forcibly volunteered for cure testing. As a result, many previously unknown details regarding Cinder's origins surface. At the same time, tensions are rising between Earth and Luna, a lunar colony where most of the citizens have special abilities, with Prince Kaito caught in the middle between his people and the villainous Lunar Queen.

=== Scarlet ===
Scarlet is the second book in The Lunar Chronicles and third chronologically. It was published on February 5, 2013.

Scarlet Benoit (based on "Little Red Riding Hood") is the granddaughter of Michelle Benoit, a farmer and former military pilot who has suddenly disappeared, leaving Scarlet on her own. On Scarlet's journey to find her grandmother, she works hesitantly with a street fighter named Wolf, who is a genetically altered Lunar warrior. Unfortunately, as Scarlet's admiration for Wolf grows, his old Lunar pack puts them in unusual circumstances, testing Wolf's loyalties. Deeper connections surface as the pack's malicious intent is finally exposed. Simultaneously, Cinder joins forces with the convict, Carswell Thorne. As the search continues, Scarlet meets Cinder and becomes an ally in her plan to stop the tyranny of Lunar Queen Levana and her thaumaturge, Sybil Mira.

=== Cress ===
Cress is the third book in The Lunar Chronicles and fourth chronologically. It was published on February 4, 2014.

Crescent Moon, or "Cress" Darnel (based on "Rapunzel"), is an imprisoned shell (a Lunar without special abilities and a Lunar that cannot be affected by mind manipulation) working with Sybil to aid Lunar ships in going undetected by Earth. Living alone on a satellite and harboring an enormous crush on Carswell Thorne, she secretly works to sabotage the wicked Lunar queen, and eventually, Cress teams up with Cinder and becomes entangled in her plot to save Earth. As complications arise and the crew is separated, they must do everything they can to prevent a royal wedding putting Earth into Queen Levana's hands and the commonwealth's leaving Prince Kai's. All the while, the plague has begun to mutate and even the Lunars (who were previously immune) are not safe.

=== Fairest ===
Fairest is the novella book in The Lunar Chronicles and first chronologically. It was published on January 27, 2015.

Fairest is a prequel to the other books in the series, telling the backstory and past of Queen Levana (based on the Evil Queen from "Snow White"). Fairest begins when Levana is around 15 years old and covers about ten years of her life, ending about a decade before Cinder is set. Levana has grown up in a poisonous household and has a cruel older sister who has been mentally and physically abusive to her throughout her entire life. After her parents are murdered by a Lunar assassin (a shell), Levana's sister, Channary, is set to become queen. Channary's reign is short-lived, and with Channary's ascension, Levana begins an unexpected downward spiral to becoming heartless when it comes to anything but her people. She is a tyrant.

=== Winter ===
Winter is the fourth and final book in The Lunar Chronicles and fifth chronologically. It was published on November 10, 2015.

Winter (based on "Snow White") is Queen Levana's stepdaughter. She has lived on Luna in the palace and has been raised by her stepmother. She has seen how Levana's use of "glamour" (an illusion to cause the user to look more beautiful) has turned her into a heartless tyrant. Winter decided to never use her gift, so she has not used her Lunar "glamour" since she was twelve. A side effect of not using glamour causes loss of sanity for Lunars, and Winter is afflicted with horrible visions. She often sees blood on the walls of the palace. Over the course of the novel, her mental state starts to slowly deteriorate. Winter's only source of comfort from the hallucinations is her guard, childhood friend, and crush, Jacin. Princess Winter and Scarlet become close friends. Princess Winter is admired by the Lunar people for her grace and kindness, and despite the scars that mar her face, her beauty is said to be even more breathtaking than that of her stepmother, Queen Levana.

Winter despises her stepmother and knows Levana will not approve of her feelings for Jacin. However, Winter is not as weak as Levana believes her to be, and she has been undermining her stepmother's wishes for years. Together with the cyborg mechanic, Cinder, and her allies, Winter might even have the power to launch a revolution and win a war that has been raging for far too long.

== Supplementary works ==
=== Stars Above ===
Stars Above is a collection of short tie-in stories set in The Lunar Chronicles universe. It was published on February 2, 2016. It includes four previously individually released novellas and five original stories:

- The Keeper: A prequel to The Lunar Chronicles, showing a young Scarlet and how Princess Selene came into the care of Michelle Benoit.
- Glitches: A short story that takes place before the events of Cinder about Cinder coming to live with her new family at age 11, and the death of Linh Garan, Cinder's stepfather. It was released on January 27, 2014.
- The Queen's Army: A short story about Wolf and his brother Ran's past before Scarlet. It was released on November 20, 2012.
- Carswell's Guide to Being Lucky: A short story detailing the incident between Carswell Thorne and Kate Fallow and the retrieval of her portscreen mentioned in Cress. A glimpse at the young Carswell Thorne, his family life, and his teenage years. It was released on February 4, 2014.
- After Sunshine Passes By: A prequel to Cress, showing how a nine-year-old Cress ended up alone on a satellite, spying on Earth for Luna.
- The Princess and The Guard: A short story about Winter and Jacin's friendship during their childhood.
- The Little Android: A retelling of "The Little Mermaid" that takes place before the events of Cinder. It was released on January 27, 2014.
- The Mechanic: A short story about the first meeting of Linh Cinder and Prince Kai, from Kai's perspective.
- Something Old, Something New: A short story set about 2 years after Winter during Scarlet and Wolf's wedding, in which Kai proposes to Cinder.

=== Wires and Nerve ===
Wires and Nerve is a graphic novel series written by Meyer also based in the world of The Lunar Chronicles. Set after the events of the Lunar Chronicles but before the Stars Above epilogue, it features many of the same characters, with Iko as the protagonist. The first book, Wires and Nerve, Volume 1, illustrated by Douglas Holgate, was released on January 31, 2017. The second book, Wires and Nerve, Volume 2, illustrated by Stephen Gilpin, was released on January 30, 2018.

== Origins ==
The idea for the series started with an entry Meyer wrote for an online Sailor Moon fan fiction writing contest in 2008. The contest had a list of 10 things, in which she had to choose two things to use in a short story. From the list, she chose to use a fairy tale character and to set the story in the future. She ended up writing a short story that was a futuristic retelling of Puss in Boots with Sailor Moon characters. It was the first time Meyer ever wrote science fiction, and it inspired her to give sci-fi twists to classic fairy tales.

Meyer chose to adapt Cinderella, Red Riding Hood, Rapunzel and Snow White as she felt she had the best ideas for them. She chose different parts of the world to set the different books in, because she wanted the series to have "a really big global feel, in part because the issues the characters are facing are big global issues — there's this war happening between Earth and Luna that affects everybody on the planet, and there's this plague that has become an enormous widespread problem." She also wanted readers to know that "this wasn't just happening in this one city or in this one country; this was something that affects everybody." She planned to write a series, though she first envisioned it with every book being a standalone story, and it wasn't until later when she was brainstorming and started outlining the books that she decided it was going to become one continuous story in which different fairy tale characters would merge to take down the evil queen instead.

Meyer developed the initial drafts of Cinder, Scarlet and Cress for the November 2008 National Novel Writing Month (NaNoWriMo). However, all three of those novels had to be mostly scrapped and rewritten during revisions.

== Reception ==
The series is a retelling of fairytales where the female protagonists were originally passive participants. Due to the portrayal of strong female characters as an alternate to the conventional fairytale characters throughout its four books, this series is now considered an example of feminist literature.

== Animated feature film adaptation ==
Marissa Meyer reported that the animated feature film rights for The Lunar Chronicles were optioned and a film was in development at Universal Pictures. In February 2019, Meyer posted on her Instagram account that she was awaiting a phone call from her film agent, but no news, concerning a Lunar Chronicles animated feature film, had arisen since then. However, in January 2022, Locksmith Animation acquired the animated feature film rights to the novel series. In June 2023, it was announced that Locksmith and Warner Bros. Pictures Animation would produce The Lunar Chronicles with Warner Bros. Pictures taking over the distribution rights from Universal. It was also announced that Noëlle Raffaele would direct the film and Kalen Egan and Travis Sentell would write it. On June 9, 2025, it was announced to be scheduled for release on November 3, 2028 and that Industrial Light & Magic would provide the animation on the film.
