= National Novel Writing Month =

U.S. nonprofit organization

- Dissolved: March 31, 2025; 19 months ago
- Website: No longer active (was: www.nanowrimo.org)
- Commercial: No
- Launched: July 1, 1999; 27 years ago
- Current status: Defunct

National Novel Writing Month, often shortened to NaNoWriMo (/ˌnænoʊˈraɪmoʊ/ NAN-oh-RY-moh), was an annual creative writing challenge that took place in November of each year. Participants were tasked with writing a 50,000-word novel draft by the end of the month, aiming for an average of 1,667 words each day. Writers were instructed to prioritize speed and quantity over quality, with the 50,000 word count being the primary goal (although writers are free to edit their drafts after the competition). The U.S. based nonprofit organization that founded the project closed in 2025 due to scandals and financial issues, but the spirit of the event lives on through community-led initiatives and alternative platforms.

The project began in July 1999 in San Francisco with 21 participants. It snowballed over the next two decades, with over 400,000 people participating in 2022. In March 2025, the organization announced it was shutting down, with interim executive director Kilby Blades publishing a YouTube video citing financial struggles and "community vitriol" as the reasons for closure.

During the 25 years of the organization's existence, its website provided participants—called "Wrimos"—with an online community of support, information about local meetups, and tips for writer's block. Writers wishing to participate first registered on the project's website, where they could post profiles and information about their novels, including synopses and excerpts, and give each other feedback. Well-known authors wrote "pep talks" to motivate participants throughout the month. Regional volunteers, called "Municipal Liaisons," provided networking and advice, and organized in-person and virtual writing events for local writers.

== History ==
Freelance writer Chris Baty founded the project in July 1999 with 21 participants in the San Francisco Bay area. In 2000, he moved the event to November "to more fully take advantage of the miserable weather." He launched an official website to promote the event, designed by a friend. That year, 140 participants signed up. Due to the increasing popularity, Baty formed a Yahoo! group to create a community for the writers. When group members inquired about the guidelines, he established the project's basic ground rules: the novel must be new, cannot be co-authored, and must be submitted in time to be verified by the November 30 deadline. Of the 140 participants, 29 successfully completed the challenge in time, as verified by Baty himself.

The following November, Baty expected similar numbers, but 5,000 writers registered, which he credits to the program being promoted by bloggers and news organizations such as the Los Angeles Times and the Washington Post. Although Baty was happy with the large turnout and popularity of the event, he and the organization were not prepared to manage that many participants. The website had several glitches, which almost led to the cancelation of the event that year. In the end, they were able to move forward with the program, but asked people to self-identify as winners on an honor system rather than having to manually verify each participant; 700 people did so.

2002 saw technical improvements and increased automation to the site. Media attention from National Public Radio and CBS Evening News drew increased attention and a participant count of 14,000. The next year, the NaNoWriMo team began the Municipal Liaison program, where volunteers could act as moderators in the forums as well as send out the first set of pep talk emails. Municipal Liaisons also acted as leaders for a specific region under their jurisdiction—organizing fundraisers and calling meetings for NaNoWriMo participants residing in their region. Baty also began work on his debut book No Plot? No Problem! during the 2003 NaNoWriMo, writing the NaNoWriMo guide concurrently with his own novel.

In 2006, NaNoWriMo was registered as a nonprofit organization due to the event growing strongly every year. The nonprofit was originally named The Office of Letters and Light.

In 2011, the NaNoWriMo website was given a new layout and forums. Baty announced that he would be stepping down as executive director in January 2012 to pursue a full-time writing career. Grant Faulkner took his position as executive director. The redesigned website moved from the web server Drupal to Ruby on Rails. During the first month after launch, the new website supported over 1,000,000 visitors and more than 39,000,000 page views.

By 2015, 431,626 people participated (633 different regions) in NaNoWriMo. Of those participants, more than 40,000 won.

In 2017, NaNoWriMo launched fundraising efforts to redesign the website again, raising $57,320. The new website was delayed, launching in 2019.

In late 2023, Grant Faulkner left the position of executive director. 2024 saw several staffing changes and the appointment of former board president Kilby Blades as interim director, while Faulkner held the position of Financial Stewardship Director from December 2023 to February 2024. That year, the organization posted to their website an entry titled "What is NaNoWriMo's position on Artificial Intelligence (AI)?", in which they deemed the use of AI to be acceptable and stated "the categorical condemnation of Artificial Intelligence has classist and ableist undertones." This stance generated controversy in the online community, with many on social media stating they were withdrawing support of or participation in the NaNoWriMo event. Some noted that makers of AI writing tools, such as ProWritingAid, were now listed among the sponsors for the event. In response to this statement, author Daniel José Older resigned from NaNoWriMo's Writers' Board, and author Maureen Johnson resigned from the Writers' Board of the Young Writers Program. NaNoWriMo also lost a sponsor, the writing collaboration platform Ellipsus, and The Mary Sue noted that FreeWrite had been removed from the sponsor page.

In response to the controversy, NaNoWriMo stated that their "commentary on ableism and classism was relevant to the bullying dynamics we were seeing across our social channels." They further clarified that the original statement posted was not a complete representation of their stance on the topic. These subsequent statements failed to allay criticism.

In 31 March 2025, director Kilby Blades published a YouTube video announcing the closure of the nonprofit, citing financial struggles and "community vitriol."

== Rules ==
Since NaNoWriMo is used to get people writing, the rules are kept broad and straightforward:

1. Writing starts on November 1 at 12:00:00 a.m. and ends on November 30 at 11:59:59 p.m.
2. No one is allowed to start early.
3. Novels must reach at least 50,000 words by the end of November in order to win. These words can either be a complete novel of 50,000 words, or the first 50,000 words of a novel to be completed later.
4. Planning and extensive notes are permitted, but no material written before the November 1 start date can go into the body of the novel.
5. Participants can use any genre, theme, or language. According to the website's FAQ, "If you believe you're writing a novel, we believe you're writing a novel too." Various forms of fiction are allowed, including fan fiction (which uses characters or settings from the published work of others), metafiction, novels in poem format, or screenplays. Even "rebelling" by writing something other than a novel is allowed, including non-fiction, video games, scripts, or academic writing, as NaNoWriMo is considered a "self-challenge"; rebels are allowed to self-validate and receive any prizes from sponsors.

== Winning and prizes ==
To win NaNoWriMo, participants must write an average of 1,667 words per day (69 per hour, 1.2 per minute) in November to reach the goal of 50,000 words written toward a novel. Organizers of the event said that the aim was to get people to start writing, using the deadline as an incentive to get the story going and to put words to paper. There was no fee to participate in NaNoWriMo; registration was only required for novel verification.

No official prizes were awarded for length, quality, or speed, though self-awarded badges were available on the site. Anyone who reached the 50,000-word mark was declared a winner. Beginning November 20, participants could submit their novel to be automatically verified for length and receive a printable certificate, an icon they could display on the web, and inclusion on the list of winners. No precautions were taken to prevent cheating; since the reward for winning was the finished novel itself and the satisfaction of having written it, there was little incentive to cheat. Novels were verified for word count by software, and could be scrambled or otherwise encrypted before being submitted for verification, although the software does not keep any other record of text input. It was possible to win without anyone other than the author ever seeing or reading the novel. Verification ended with the website redesign in 2019. Winning was now achieved by simply entering a word count of more than 50,000 words.

In October 2007, the self-publishing company CreateSpace teamed up with NaNoWriMo to begin offering winners a single free, paperback proof copy of their manuscripts, with the option to use the proof to then sell the novel on Amazon.com. In 2011, CreateSpace offered winners five free, paperback proof copies of their manuscripts. In addition to CreateSpace, each year NaNoWriMo had a new list of sponsors that reward winners and participants with various discounts and prizes. 2015 was the last year that CreateSpace partnered with NaNoWriMo.

=== Controversial sponsors ===
In 2022, NaNoWriMo partnered with Inkitt and Manuscript Press to offer special NaNoWriMo publishing packages for winners. Inkitt users reported constantly shifting business practices and coercing new authors into unfriendly contract terms, while Manuscripts Press allegedly charged exorbitant self-publishing fees, requiring authors to offset any costs not covered in crowdfunding. Users who questioned these sponsors were initially temporarily banned from the NaNoWriMo forums. Ultimately, NaNoWriMo staff agreed to sever their partnerships with Inkitt and Manuscript Press and update their partnership practices to prioritize companies that were accessible to authors that lacked representation or legal counsel.

== Community ==
=== Forums ===
The official forums provided a place for advice, information, criticism, support, and an opportunity for "collective procrastination". The forums were available from the beginning of October, when signups for the year began, until late September the following year, when they were archived and the database was wiped in preparation for that year's NaNoWriMo forums to start up again.

In response to community concerns about inappropriate behaviour and moderation on the forums, including allegations of child grooming by moderators and of delayed action by staff, the board launched an investigation and placed the forums into read-only mode. The Board of Directors found that the NaNoWriMo's staff had a history of overpromising and underdelivering as well as a lack of transparency/community accountability and too few people trying to do too much. Subsequently, several staffing and policy changes were announced. Plans to restructure the forums as a closed space with a small group focus and certified educators rather than open user groups were announced, but the forums were ultimately never reopened until the announcement of the organization's closure.

=== Municipal Liaisons ===
Most regions had one or more Municipal Liaisons (ML) assigned to them, who were volunteers tasked with organizing local events and mediating regional forums. MLs were encouraged to coordinate at least two kinds of meet-ups; a kickoff party, and a "Thank God It's Over" party to celebrate successes and share novels. Kickoff parties were often held the weekend before November to give local writers a chance to meet and get geared up, although some were held on Halloween night past midnight so writers start writing in a community setting. Other events could be scheduled, including weekend meet-ups or overnight write-ins.

After the 2024 grooming allegations and subsequent structuring changes, in the face of continued concerns voiced by volunteers and donors, the organisation removed access from all ML volunteers.

=== The Night of Writing Dangerously ===
In November 2007, NaNoWriMo hosted a fundraising Write-a-thon event called "The Night of Writing Dangerously", held in San Francisco. The first 250 participants to donate at least $200 to the NaNoWriMo website received reservations at this annual event, at which participants met the organization's staff, listened to speeches, chatted, ate, participated in raffles, and competed to see who could write the most at the event. In 2015, this fundraiser raised over $56,000. By 2016, the required donation amount to attend the event had risen to $300. 2018 was the last year in which the event was held, as the cost to put on the event rose and the funds raised by the event decreased.

== Programs ==
=== Laptop Loaners ===
Starting in 2002, NaNoWriMo ran a Laptop Loaner program for those without regular access to a computer or word processor. Functional used laptops were donated by NaNoWriMo participants, and borrowers were required to send a $300 deposit with proof of identity and cover the cost of return shipping.

In 2008, AlphaSmart, Inc. donated 25 Neo word processors.

In 2009 the Laptop Loaner program ended before that year's NaNoWriMo event.

=== Young Writers Program ===
In 2004, NaNoWriMo started the Young Writers Program (YWP), a writing workshop aimed to aid classrooms of kindergarten through 12th-grade students. The difference between the regular program and the YWP was that kids could choose how many words to try to write. The word count goal for a young writer can range from a few thousand words, to the adult-standard 50,000, and even higher in some cases; a typical standard was around 30,000. In its inaugural year, the program was used in 150 classrooms and involved 4000 students. Teachers registered their classroom for participation and were sent a starter kit of materials to use in the class which included reward items like stickers and pencils. Lesson plans and writing ideas were also offered as resources to teachers, while students could communicate through the program's forums. The only age restriction on the YWP was that, in most circumstances, no one could be over 18. When a user turned 18, they were sent to the main site; however, high school seniors who turned 18 during their senior year could remain in the program until graduation. YWP had their own separate forums.

=== The Office of Letters and Light ===
In September 2006, NaNoWriMo officially became a 501(c)(3) non-profit organization operating under the name "The Office of Letters and Light".

In 2004, the nonprofit partnered with child literacy non-profit Room to Read, and continued that partnership for three years. Fifty percent of net proceeds from 2004 to 2006 were used to build libraries in Southeast Asia; three were built in Cambodia, seven in Laos, and seven in Vietnam. The program was retired in 2007 to refocus resources on NaNoWriMo and the Young Writers Program.

=== Camp NaNoWriMo ===
A summer version of NaNoWriMo, called Camp NaNoWriMo, launched in 2011. Two sessions were held, one in July and one in August; however, the months were switched to June and August for Camp NaNoWriMo 2012. The two months were then switched to April and July for 2013 and 2014, afterwards remaining the same. The rules used for the main event in November also applied to each Camp NaNoWriMo session.

There used to be a Camp NaNoWriMo website, but it was merged into the main NaNoWriMo site. The cabins were now made by making groups on the site, each with its own message board visible only by members of that cabin. Camp NaNoWriMo participants could choose their word count goal, similar to the Young Writers Program.

=== The "Now What?" Months ===
In 2013, January and February were deemed NaNoWriMo's "Now What?" Months, designed to help novelists during the editing and revision process. To participate, writers committed to revisit their novels, signing a contract via NaNoWriMo, then attending Internet seminars where publishing experts and NaNoWriMo novelists advised writers on the next steps for their draft.

== Published NaNoWriMo novels ==
Since 2006, nearly 400 NaNoWriMo novels have been published via traditional publishing houses and over 200 novels have been published by smaller presses or self-published.

Some notable titles include:

- Water for Elephants by Sara Gruen, published by Algonquin Books of Chapel Hill
- Anna and the French Kiss by Stephanie Perkins, published by Dutton Juvenile
- The Night Circus by Erin Morgenstern, published by Doubleday
- Wool by Hugh Howey, published by Simon & Schuster
- Cinder by Marissa Meyer, published by Square Fish
- Fangirl by Rainbow Rowell, published by St. Martin's Press
- The Darwin Elevator by Jason M. Hough, published by Del Rey Books
- Side Effects May Vary by Julie Murphy, published by HarperCollins Publishers
- The Forest of Hands and Teeth by Carrie Ryan, published by Gollancz

== Spin-off events ==
- National Haiku Writing Month: Also known as NaHaiWriMo, held in February every year, starting in 2011
- Script Frenzy: creating a script in April of every year that ran from 2007–2012
- Southern Cross Novel Challenge: southern hemisphere version of event that ran in June from 2007–2013
- Various websites have been created as replacements after NaNoWriMo's shutdown, but none has achieved widespread adoption.

== See also ==
- Lune Spark Young Writers' Short Story Contest
- National Kids-in-Print Book Contest for Students
- National Poetry Writing Month
- PBS Kids Writers Contest
- Three-Day Novel Contest
