= National Kids-in-Print Book Contest for Students =

- Awarded for: Honoring books written and illustrated by young people
- Country: United States
- Presented by: Landmark House
- First award: 1985
- Final award: 2007

The National Kids-in-Print Book Contest for Students is a literary competition held by Landmark House (formerly Landmark Editions) of Kansas City, Kansas. It was launched by David Melton, one of the publisher's staff members.

== History ==
Landmark inaugurated the program in the mid-1980s as The National Written and Illustrated by... Awards Contest for Students, and ran it until 1999. A year later, future awards were canceled indefinitely, due to falling sales of their titles caused by "the financial crunch in many schools and libraries". In 2006 and 2007, the company revived it as the David Melton Memorial Written and Illustrated by... Contest for Students, before rebranding it under the current name.

== Winners ==
Year	Winner by category			
Year	Ages 6–9	Ages 10–13	Ages 14–19	Gold Award
As the National Written and Illustrated by... Awards Contest for Students
1985				The Dragon of Ord; David McAdoo; Walking Is Wild, Weird and Wacky; Karen Kerber
1986	Strong and Free; Amy Hagstrom	Me and My Veggies; Isaac Whitlatch	World War Won; Dav Pilkey	
1987	Joshua Disobeys; Dennis Vollmer	The Half & Half Dog; Lisa Gross	Who Owns the Sun?; Stacy Chbosky	
1988	Who Can Fix It?; Leslie Ann MacKeen	Elmer the Grump; Elizabeth Haidle	Taddy McFinley and the Great Grey Grimly; Heidi Salter	
1989	Problems at the North Pole; Lauren Peters	The Legend of Sir Miguel; Michael Cain	We Are a Thunderstorm; Amity Gaige	Broken Arrow Boy; Adam Moore; Get That Goat!; Michael Aushenker
1990	Oliver and the Oil Spill; Aruna Chandrasekhar	Life in the Ghetto; Anika Thomas	A Stone Promise; Cara Reichel	Patulous, the Prairie Rattlesnake; Jonathan Kahn; Too Much Trick or Treat; Jayna Miller
1991	Punt, Pass & Point!; Alise Leggat	Nina's Magic; Lisa Butenhoff	Jambi and the Lions; Jennifer Brady	
1992	Alien Invasions; Benjamin Kendall	Fogbound; Steven Shepard	Changes; Travis Williams	Abracadabra; Amy Jones; A Special Day; Dubravka Kolanovic
1993	Thomas Raccoon's Fantastic Airshow; Shintaro Maeda	The Sunflower; Miles MacGregor	The Shadow Shop; Kristin Pedersen	
1994	Bright Eyes and the Buffalo Hunt; Laura Hughes	Critter Crackers: The ABC Book of Limericks; Kathryn Barron	Glory Trail; Taramesha Maniatty	
1995	Circus Adventures; Lindsey Wolter	The Timekeeper; Anna Riphahn	Darius, the Lonely Gargoyle; Micha Estlack	
1996	Mouse Surprise; Alexandra Whitney	Don't Bug Me!; Gillian McHale	The Incredible Jelly Bean Day; Taylor Maw	
1997	Summer Discovery; Drew Carson	The Mists of Eden: Nature's Last Paradise; Erica Sherman	The Pigs Went Marching Out!; Justin Rigamonti	
1998	The Adventures of Bob and Red; David Barron	This One's for You!; Zach Dillon	The Moas; Katie Beck	Fluffy; Danielle Johnson
As the David Melton Memorial Written and Illustrated by... Contest for Students
2006	Slime for a Dragon; Daniel Carr	The Legend of How Kansas Got Chipped; Corina White	Mrs. McFig and the Very Big Wig; David Miles	Ickypoo; Thomas Yu; Eva's Story; Phoebe Unterman; Spirit of the Amazon; Thornton Blease
2007	Trail to Victory Mountain; Sora Nithikasem	Berrie the Bear; Gina S. DeCagna	Just a Bit of String; N/A	The Ordinary Indians; Sharon Moore; Coyotes; Gabriella Macioci
As the National Kids-in-Print Book Contest for Students
2008–	No known awards given yet			

== See also ==
- Lune Spark Young Writers' Short Story Contest
- PBS Kids Writers Contest
- National Novel Writing Month
- Three-Day Novel Contest
