= Script Frenzy =

International screenwriting challenge

The Script Frenzy logo

Script Frenzy, also known as Screnzy /ˈskrɛn.ziː/, was an international screenwriting challenge where participants attempted to write a script (for the stage, screen, or other media) during the month of April.

The event was organized by The Office of Letters and Light, the nonprofit organization behind National Novel Writing Month ("NaNoWriMo"). It ran each year from 2007 until 2012.

== Original format, and developments ==
The first Script Frenzy was held in June 2007 with a goal of 20,000 words to win. In 2008, Script Frenzy was moved to April and the goal was changed to 100 pages. The goals are roughly equivalent; the change simply reflects the fact that page count is a more standard measure of script length.

Other changes include the ability for writers to team up and work as two-person teams. The functionality was given to link both writers such that their page count would be shared.

Finally, in the original Script Frenzy only screenplays and stage plays were permitted. This has been expanded to include other types of scripts including TV series, graphic novels, shorts and audio plays amongst others. For the shorter formats, participants were allowed to submit several scripts to make up the 100-page total.

== Closure of the event ==
On June 26, 2012, it was announced that Script Frenzy was being closed down. The decision was made by the Office of Letters and Lights board after close consideration and a vote. The event was cancelled due to a continued decline in participants and, likewise, a continued decline in donations.

== Statistics ==
Adult Program Statistics:

- 2007 = 8,000 participants
- 2008 = More than 8,000 participants
- 2009 = Not yet released, but it is known that it was about half of 2010's participant total, placing 2009 at around 11,000 participants.
- 2010 = 21,666 participants (peak year)
- 2011 = 19,123 Participants
- 2012 = 16,358 Participants and 1,867 winners, as reported by the OLL Blog.

Young Writers Program Statistics:

- 2007 = Not yet released, but it is known that it was about 40% of the 2012 total, placing 2007 at about 1,600 participants.
- 2008-2010 = Continued to grow, exact numbers not known.
- 2011 = 3,000 participants
- 2012 = 3,929 participants, as reported by the OLL Blog.

== Rules ==
The 5 Basic Rules of Script Frenzy are as follows:

1. To be crowned an official Script Frenzy winner, you must write a script (or multiple scripts) of at least 100 total pages and verify this tally on ScriptFrenzy.org.
2. You may write individually or in teams of two. Writer teams will have a 100-page total goal for their co-written script or scripts.
3. Script writing may begin no earlier than 12:00:01 a.m. on April 1 and must cease no later than 11:59:59 p.m. on April 30, local time.
4. You may write screenplays, stage plays, TV shows, short films, comic book and graphic novel scripts, adaptations of novels, or any other type of script your heart desires.
5. You must, at some point, have ridiculous amounts of fun.

== See also ==
Script Frenzy is the script version of National Novel Writing Month, better-known as NaNoWriMo, where participants use November's 30 days to try to write 50,000 words of prose (a short novel, or series of short stories, or part of a longer novel). NaNoWriMo was started in July 1999 by Chris Baty, and garnered a mere 21 participants. In 2000, the challenge moved to November, and by 2009, the event had 170,000 participants.
