= Julie Murphy (author) =

American author

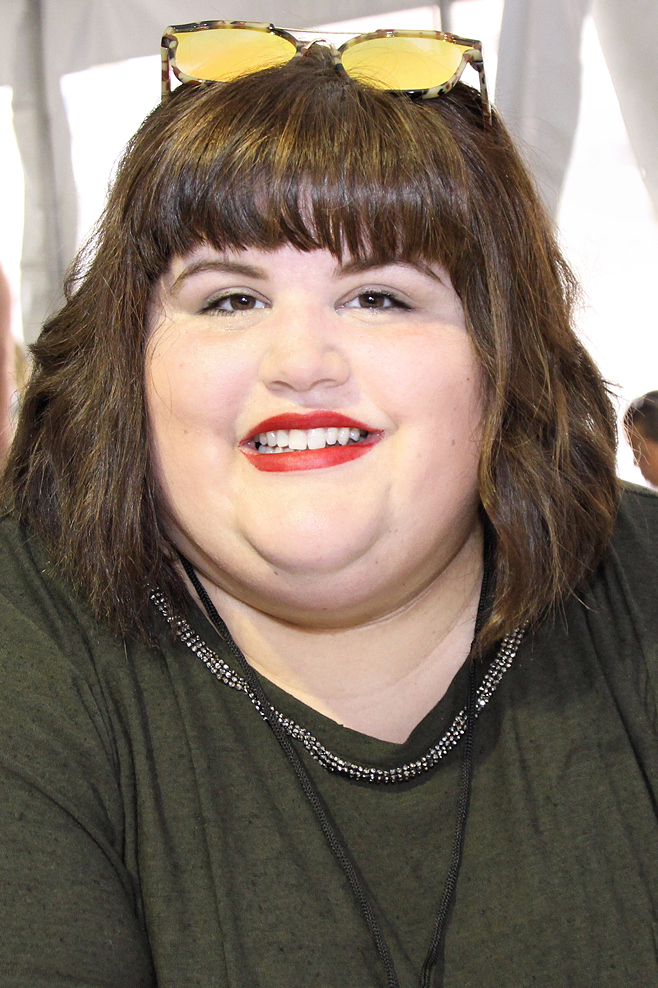
- Murphy at the 2017 Texas Book Festival
- Born: November 8, 1985 (age 40)
- Genre: young adult fiction
- Notable works: Side Effects May Vary; Dumplin'

Website
- juliemurphywrites.com

Julie Murphy (born November 8, 1985) is the #1 New York Times bestselling author of the books Side Effects May Vary (2014), Dumplin' (2015), Ramona Blue (2017), and Puddin' (2018). Murphy wrote her first novel, Side Effects May Vary, during National Novel Writing Month.

== Career ==
Murphy's literary debut was the young adult (YA) novel Side Effects May Vary which was published by Balzer + Bray on March 18, 2014. Murphy wrote the book as part of National Novel Writing Month around 2010 while working as a librarian in Texas.

Her next young adult novel, titled Dumplin', was published in 2015. Critical reception for Dumplin’ has been positive. The novel became a New York Times bestseller. Dumplin' was adapted into a Netflix movie of the same name in 2018. The novel was the first of a trilogy and was followed by Puddin’ (2018) and Pumpkin (2021).

In 2017, Murphy released her third YA novel titled Ramona Blue. Nivea Serrao, for Entertainment Weekly, commented that "First came Side Effects May Vary‘s Alice, then came Dumplin’s Willowdean, and now there’s the titular Ramona Blue. Julie Murphy has a knack for crafting memorable YA protagonists".

Her first middle grade novel, titled Dear Sweet Pea, was published in 2019. Nivea Serrao, for Entertainment Weekly, commented that "the best-selling author of Dumplin’ [...] and Ramona Blue has broken out in YA fiction with a message. And her books continue to resonate for so much more: their plucky characters, their irresistible sweetness, their delightful sense of humor. Now the author is returning with a new novel that carries her signature appeal, this time in the middle-grade space". In 2019, Disney Channel optioned the rights to Dear Sweet Pea, and it is on the Disney Channel Original Movie development slate.

In 2020, Murphy retold the origin story of the superhero Faith Herbert from Valiant Comics in the YA prose novel Faith: Taking Flight. Kayleigh Donaldson, for SyFy Wire, wrote that "the message being sent is clear: To the rest of the world, it is impossible to be both fat and happy. [...] That's what makes characters like Faith and writers like Murphy so desperately necessary. They're a potent rebuttal to decades of systemic fatphobia through the act of creative joy". Murphy's sequel, Faith: Greater Heights, was then released in 2021.

== Personal life ==
During Murphy's childhood, her family struggled financially and lost their home the week she graduated from high school. Because of this, she had to delay going to college.

She lives in Texas with her husband. Murphy is openly bisexual.

== Bibliography ==
=== Young adult novels ===
Dumplin' series:

1. Dumplin' (2015)
2. Puddin' (2018)
3. Dear Sweet Pea (2019), children's novel
4. Pumpkin (2021)

Faith Herbert Origin Story series:

1. Faith: Taking Flight (2020)
2. Faith: Greater Heights (2021)

Stand-alones:

- Side Effects May Vary (2014)
- Ramona Blue (2017)

=== Young adult short stories ===
- "April May June" (2014)
- "Dear God" (2014)
- "House of Screams" (2014)
- "Jennifer" (2014)
- "Ramona Drowning" (2014)
- "The Secret Language of Light" (2014)
- "One Summer" (2015)
- "The Record Keeper's Duty" (2015)
- "You Say Goodbye, I Say Hello" (2015)

=== Adult novels ===
- If the Shoe Fits (2021), Meant to Be #1 series
- A Merry Little Meet Cute (2022), with Sierra Simone
- A Holly Jolly Ever After (2023), with Sierra Simone
- A Jingle Bell Mingle (2024), with Sierra Simone
- Fundamentals of Being a Good Girl (2026), with Sierra Simone

=== Adult novellas ===
- Snow Place Like LA (2023), with Sierra Simone
- Seas and Greetings (2023), with Sierra Simone

== Adaptations ==
- Dumplin' (2018), film directed by Anne Fletcher, based on young adult novel Dumplin'
