= Marguerite Sauvage =

French illustrator and scriptwriter

- Born: Paris
- Education: French Press Institute, Paris 8 University
- Known for: illustrator, scriptwriter

Marguerite Sauvage is a French illustrator and scriptwriter. She has provided illustrations in press, publishing and advertising (Society of Illustrators 49th, American Illustration 26, American Illustration 28).

She is also a comic book artist and has worked on titles including Faith and Bombshells. She was nominated for both the Eisner Award and Joe Shuster Award in 2017, the GLAAD Media Award also in 2017 and the Russ Manning Award in 2016.

== Biography ==
Sauvage was born in Paris and grew up in Seine-et-Marne. She holds a Master's degree in Information and Communication from the Institut Français de Presse at Paris 2 University and a DESS in Hypermedia and Electronic Publishing from Paris 8 University. Sauvage moved to live in Montreal, Canada, in 2014, after having lived in both Paris and Sydney, Australia.

== Career ==
=== Illustration ===
After she graduated from university Sauvage decided to become an illustrator and was represented by Michel Lagarde at Agent 002 agency and then Virginie Challamel at Virginie agency. Her illustrations appeared in titles such as ELLE, Glamour Flaunt and Cosmopolitan. She has also worked in advertising for brands such as Longchamp, St Dupont, Swarovski, ING and Old Navy. Since 2003 she has worked internationally and has worked in Japan, Korea, America and Europe. Sauvage's work has been listed in books on the contemporary arts such as ILLUSTRATION NOW! by Tashen, The Big Book of Fashion Illustration by Tashen or ILLUSIVE 1 and ILLUSIVE 3 by Die Gestalten Verlag.

Sauvage created the poster for the American TV series Agents of S.H.I.E.L.D. episode "Scars".

=== Animation and video game work ===
In 2008, Sauvage created the TV series Cultural Quest with Mister Otter (Les Aventures Culturelles de Monsieur Loutre), of which she was the art and story author, as well as art director and scriptwriter of some episodes. The series has been broadcast by the national France 3 TV channel after a year of production at La Station Animation. The show is available online in other languages including English through Da Vinci Kids.

Sauvage has worked for both the animation and video games industries, including for (FoxKids, Ubisoft) as a characters and backgrounds designer and as a scriptwriter on Vicky the Viking.

=== Blogs and comic books ===
In 2008 Sauvage launched a blog and webcomic called Les Madeleines de Mady (Mady's Madeleines) under the pseudonym of Mady or Madeleine Martin. The blog used a more cartoony and sleek style and was quickly published by Delcourt in two albums. Mady has also illustrated for Fluide Glacial the two comic books of Et toi quand est-ce-que tu t'y mets ? with Véronique Cazot on the script and Alice and Valentine with Pa Ming Chiu at Jungle Editions.

In 2014 Sauvage has been noticed by the world of American comic books. She was contacted to make the covers of Hinterkind published by Vertigo Comics, then to illustrate ten pages on Wonder Woman as a rockstar for Sensation Comics ft Wonder Woman at DC Comics. She has been working as a cover and sequential artist on many titles including Ms.Marvel, Hawkeye, Archie Comics and Red Sonja. She participated in the launching of two major series dedicated to positive representation, Faith with Valiant Comics and Bombshells with DC Comics. She has also been writing for comics (Adventure Time Lost in Space, Faith Winter Wonderland ...).

== Awards and nominations ==
- Eisner awards (best series for Faith) 2017
- Joe Shuster awards nominated 2017
- GLAAD awards nomination 2017
- Russ Manning awards nominated 2016
- Applied Arts Magazine
- Society of Illustrators 49th
- American Illustration 26
- American Illustration 28

== Bibliography ==
=== Scriptwriter ===
- Adventure Time Comics (2016)
- Faith's Winter Wonderland Special (2017)
- Les Madeleines de Mady 2 (2011)
- Les Madeleines de Mady 1 (2010)

=== Cover artist ===
- Adventure Time: The Flip Side (2014)
- All-New Captain America (2015)
- America (2017)
- Archie (2015)
- Assassin's Creed (2015)
- Black Panther (2016)
- Black Panther: World of Wakanda (2017)
- Bleeding Cool Magazine (2012)
- Bloodshot Reborn (2015)
- Book of Death (2015)
- Book of Death: Legends of the Geomancer (2015)
- Captain Marvel (2016)
- Civil War (2015)
- Daredevil (2014)
- DC Comics Bombshells (2015)
- DC Comics: Bombshells (2015)
- Faith (2016)
- Faith (II) (2016)
- Faith and the Future Force (2017)
- Faith's Winter Wonderland Special (2017)
- The Fall and Rise of Captain Atom (2017)
- Fresh Romance (2015)
- Glitterbomb (2016)
- Goldie Vance (2016)
- Harbinger Renegade (2016)
- Hawkeye (2017)
- Hinterkind (2013)
- Jean Grey (2017)
- Jem and The Holograms (2015)
- Jem and the Holograms: Infinite (2017)
- Josie and the Pussycats (2016)
- Jughead (2015)
- Justice League/Power Rangers (2017)
- Mighty Morphin Power Rangers: Pink (2016)
- Mighty Thor (2016)
- Ms. Marvel (2014)
- Ms. Marvel [GER] (2015)
- Ninjak (2015)
- Octobriana With Love (2021)
- Patsy Walker, A.K.A. Hellcat! (2016)
- Red Sonja (2016)
- Refuse x Last Resorts (2021)
- Rise (2015)
- Riverdale (2017)
- Secret Wars (2015)
- Secret Weapons (2017)
- Shade, the Changing Girl (2016)
- Spell on Wheels (2016)
- Spider-Man 2099 (2015)
- Star-Lord (2017)
- Thor (2014)
- The Unworthy Thor (2017)
- Valiant 2016 Preview (2015)
- Wayward (2014)
- The Wicked + The Divine (2014)
- Wolf Moon (2014)
- X-O Manowar (2012)
- Zodiac Starforce (2015)

=== Penciler, inker, colorist ===
- 1602 Witch Hunter Angela (2015)
- Adventure Time Comics (2016)
- Amazing Spider-Man: Renew Your Vows (2017)
- America (2017)
- The Art of Red Sonja, Volume 2 (2017)
- Black Panther (2016)
- Bombshells: United (2017)
- Bombshells: United! (2017)
- Civil War II [GER] (2017)
- Civil War II: Choosing Sides (2016)
- DC Comics Bombshells (2015)
- DC Comics: Bombshells (2015)
- Faith (2016)
- Faith (II) (2016)
- The Flintstones (2016)
- Fresh Romance (2017)
- Mad Max: Fury Road Inspired Artists Deluxe Edition (2015)
- Marvel Now! Previews (2016)
- Ninjak (2015)
- Refuse x Last Resorts (2021)
- Scarlet Witch (2016)
- Secret Wars (2015)
- Sensation Comics Featuring Wonder Woman [I] (2014)
- Sensation Comics Featuring Wonder Woman [II] (2014)
- Shade, the Changing Girl (2016)
- Thor (2014)
- Unfollow (2016)
- Valiant 2016 Preview (2015)
- Valiant: 4001 A.D. FCBD Special (2016)
- The Wicked + The Divine (2014)
- Wonder Woman 75th Anniversary Special (2016)
