= Lune Spark Young Writers' Short Story Contest =

The Lune Spark Young Writers' Short Story Contest is an annual summer contest hosted by publishing company Lune Spark, open to minor children wishing to submit their writing for print publication. Beginning in 2016 and managed by Lune Spark producer Pawan Mishra, the contest offers cash awards to winning entrants, as well as publication in one of two annual anthologies released by Lune Spark in both print and digital editions. The main judges include notable authors such as Briana Chen (author of the young adult adventure book Five Seals), Rebecca Maye Holiday (author of the occult horror novel Necromancy Cottage, Or, The Black Art of Gnawing On Bones), and Osman Welela (author of the fantasy series A Tale Of The Lost Arts).

== Notable winners ==
A number of entrants in the Lune Spark Young Writers' Short Story Contest later won and received notoriety for their work. Notable published winners include UN Child Ambassador Nico Roman, who writes climate change fiction, and child author Addison Hill (under the pseudonym "Cress Wallwalker").

== Anthologies ==
A dual set of anthologies, with short stories by younger authors and short stories by adolescent authors respectively, has been published since 2016 with the stories written by winning entrants. These anthologies are available in print (softback and hardcover), and as eBooks. Lune Spark takes on the cost of collaborative editing and proofreading the anthologies, while the individual authors retain the copyright to their own stories.

== See also ==
- Three-Day Novel Contest
- National Novel Writing Month
- National Kids-in-Print Book Contest for Students
- PBS Kids Writers Contest
