= The Crumpets =

- Also known as: Les Crumpets
- Genre: Comedy
- Based on: Petit Dernier by Didier Lévy and Frédéric Benaglia
- Developed by: Virginie Boda
- Directed by: Raoul Magrangeas
- Composer: Jacques Davidovici
- Country of origin: France
- Original language: French
- No. of seasons: 4
- No. of episodes: 105

Production
- Executive producers: Sophie Saget; Fanny Le Floch-Vergnon
- Producer: Pascal Gayrard
- Running time: 13 minutes 26 minutes ("Les Crumpets, tu fais genre !")
- Production companies: 4.21 Productions; Studio O'Bahamas

Original release
- Network: Canal+ Family (seasons 1–3); Télétoon+ (season 4)
- Release: December 21, 2013 – March 8, 2021

The Crumpets (French: Les Crumpets) is a French animated comedy television series based on the Petit Dernier book series written authored by Didier Lévy, illustrated by Frédéric Benaglia, and published by Editions Sarbacane.

The show debuted on 21 December 2013. The third and fourth seasons, which premiered on 7 December 2015 and 24 December 2017 respectively, are titled Teen Crumpets for international markets and focuses on the show's teenage characters. A 26-minute-long special, Les Crumpets, tu fais genre !, premiered on 8 March 2021.

== Plot ==
The Crumpets are a big family of pink-nosed creatures consisting of 142 children and the parents being Ma and Pa, the paternal grandmother Granny and its pet bulldog T-Bone. The baby son L'il One rivals all his siblings and his father in getting his mother's love. He has a friendship with Granny. The other characters beyond the Crumpet household, there is also McBrisk, the neighboring blue-nosed family consisting of a mother and her daughter, Pa's wealthy brother, his wife and their adoptive son.

== Cast ==
- P'tit Der / L'il One – Théo Benhamour (seasons 1–2), Victor Biavan (season 3), Wandrille Devisme (season 4) (French) and Joseph Pollock (English)
- Grand Ma / Granny – Michèle Garcia (French) and Mary O'Brady (English)
- Ma – Emmanuelle Hamet (French) and Melissa Chambers (English)
- Pa – Tom Novembre (French) and Marc Thompson (English)
- Rosénoire / Caprice – Rebecca Benhamour (French) and Kate Bristol (English)
- Pfff – Léonard Hamet (French) and Billy Bob Thompson (English)
- Midi and Midi-Cinq / Bother and Blister – Siméon Hamet, Antoine Raffin, Lucas Ripberger; Rosalie Hamet, Chiara Vergne (French), Erica Schroeder; Rebecca Soler (English)
- King – Antoine Raffin, Lucas Ripberger (French) and Alex Luscomb (English)
- Têtenlair / Ditzy – Rosalie Hamet (French) and Erica Schroeder (English)
- Oulala / Ohoh – Siméon Hamet (French) and Rebecca Soler (English)
- Triceps – Kelly Marot (French) and Rebecca Soler (English)
- Bozart / Fynartz – Léon Plazol (French) and Erica Schroeder (English)
- Grangran / Grownboy – Olivier Podesta (French) and Jason Griffith (English)
- Madame Dame / Ms. McBrisk – Marie-France Ducloz (French) and Erica Schroeder (English)
- Cassandra – Kelly Marot (French) and Nicola Barber (English)
- Tonton Karl / Uncle Hurry – Luq Hamet (French) and Eli James (English)
- Tata Greta / Aunt Harried – Juliette Degenne (French) and Rebecca Soler (English)
- Gunther / Cordless – Olivier Podesta (French) and Billy Bob Thompson (English)
- Steve – Nicolas Vitiello (French) and Darren Dunstan (English)
- Marylin – Yoann Sover (French)
- Hervé / Larry – Léon Plazol (French)
- Miley Virus – Cindy Lemineur (French)
- Reuh – Charles Germain (French)

== Development ==
In 2008, the Petit Dernier and Petite Pousse books were discovered by Éric (aka Raoul) Magrangeas, who became interested in adapting them to an animated series. In 2009, 4.21 Productions signed a contract with Editions Sarbacane to produce the cartoon adaptation. While the series is a fully French production, some parts of the animation was outsourced to China. The main themes in seasons one and two are family affairs, neighborhood quarrels, and social topics.

Mediatoon signed a worldwide distribution agreement with 4.21 Productions in 2013. The English dub for the first 52 episodes was recorded in studios in the United Kingdom and New York. The English dub for Teen Crumpets was recorded by The Kitchen studio in Miami, Florida.

== Awards ==
In April 2018, Teen Crumpets won the Cartoons on the Bay "Teens 12+" Pulcinella award in Italy.

In October 2018, Teen Crumpets (with the episode "Music Hall Therapy") won the TV Series Jury Prize at TOFUZI: International Festival of Animated Films in Georgia.
