= PBS Kids Writers Contest =

Annual art and literature award for young students

- Description: Annual art and literature competition for students
- Country: United States
- Presented by: PBS Kids
- Formerly called: Reading Rainbow Young Writers and Illustrators Contest

The PBS Kids Writers Contest is an annual art and literature competition for students grades kindergarten to 12 in the United States. The competition was relaunched under the name PBS Kids Go! Writers Contest in 2009 as a continuation from its predecessor called Reading Rainbow Young Writers and Illustrators Contest which was started in 1995.

== Early years ==
In 1995, the first competition was launched by the creators of Reading Rainbow children television program. The annual competition had been sponsored to complement the Reading Rainbow program to inspire children to have a lifelong love of reading. The competition encouraged, challenged and rewarded children to write and illustrate their own picture books. The entries were submitted to the local stations for local judging. The winners at local level would then be submitted for national-level judging.

After a few years, the number of entries that were submitted nationally had been increased to almost 40,000. The number of participants continued to increase at the peak in 2007 with more than 50,000 entries.

== Reading Rainbow funding ==
The future of the competition became questionable starting in 2006 when the funding for the Reading Rainbow program started to dry up. There was a new funding agreement but no new program had been produced since April 2006 when the commitment for funding of 52 new episodes did not pan out. The program was on a rerun since then by another funding source. This funding issue caused the creators to cancel the national-level competition in 2006. However, the local competitions organized by local public broadcasting stations continued. As the participants of the competition continued to grow into 2007 even without any new episode of Reading Rainbow, the WNED-TV station in Buffalo, New York which was a co-creator of the program took ownership to administrate the national-level judging. The national-level competition resumed in 2007. The Reading Rainbow rerun had finally come to an end on August 28, 2009. At that time, the level of participation in the competition was still high with 90 participating stations. With a strong call for expansion of the competition despite the cancellation of the program, the PBS headquarters arranged to have the winning entries to continue to be accessible online as they had been until December 2009.

== Relaunch ==
In November 2009, PBS secured its partnership with WNED-TV to launch the competition in the same format as in prior years but with the new name as PBS Kids Go! Writers Contest. They also launched a new website for the competition to update information and archive winning stories. In 2014, one year after the discontinuation of PBS Kids Go!, PBS changed the name of the Writers Contest to the PBS Kids Writers Contest.

== Format ==
Children who are in grades K through 3 within the viewing areas of participate local stations can submit their entries to their local stations. Stories can be fact or fiction, and prose or poetry but each story must be done by a single author. Stories with the illustrations done by kindergarten and first grade have word count of 50-200 words, and 100-350 words for grades 2 and 3. Each local PBS station handles local judging separately by grade levels. The first place winners from each station are sent to the national contest later in the year.

== See also ==
- Lune Spark Young Writers' Short Story Contest
- National Kids-in-Print Book Contest for Students
- National Novel Writing Month
- Three-Day Novel Contest
