= Southern Cross Novel Challenge =

Annual writing challenge

The Southern Cross Novel Challenge, or SoCNoC, was a yearly event held every June from 2007 - 2013. The southern hemisphere's version of National Novel Writing Month, June (comprising thirty days total, including one long weekend) was selected as the month for this challenge because it is considered the equivalent of the northern hemisphere's November in terms of weather and temperatures. This challenge is hosted by Kiwi Writers, a New Zealand-based writing group which housed members primarily based in New Zealand and Australia but stretched as far as the United States and Canada. SoCNoC was the largest writing competition in the Southern Hemisphere.

== History ==
June 2007 was the very first SoCNoC Challenge. Originally with 35 participants, the challenge marked 60 participants by the end of the month. The cumulative word count was over 990,000 words. In June 2008, the second SoCNoC Challenge was launched. Although only 97 participants had signed up before the beginning of the month, over 140 participants had joined by the end. The total word count for this year was over 2.6 million words. In June 2009, NaNoWriMo acknowledged SoCNoC in the beginning of week 3. There were already 1,108,663 words written by 164 participants. Total word count at the end of the challenge was 2,313,249 by 167 participants. June 2013 was the last year SoCNoc was run. After that the KiwiWriters became a health writers blog.

== Rules ==
The rules for SoCNoC are simple. The goal is to write 50,000 words on one or more novels during the thirty days of June, and participants are allowed to work on an existing novel or on multiple novels. Even compilations of short stories or poems are allowed. The challenge runs from 12:00:01am on June 1 until 11:59:59 on June 30, both according to the local time of participants, and any genre and any language are accepted.

However, for the best possible experience, the staff does recommend that a new novel is begun for the challenge. They encourage participants to aim to finish their novels at both 50,000 words and at midnight [local time], June 30, when the challenge ends.

== SoCNoC community ==
The SoCNoC forum on KiwiWriters was the official place to receive advice, information, criticism, and support. The forum is available year-round, but for the most part, members tend to peruse the other forums offered until June begins to approach. At the end of the year, the forums were collected and saved to the database so that members can still see them. The KiwiWriters log offered helpful hints, tips, and ramblings to keep SoCNoC writers on track. The klog was mainly written by the staff members of the site. The KiwiWriters Chatroom was available during the whole year, SoCNoC was when it had the most activity. During that time, there were participants in the chatroom at all hours.

== Publications ==
In July 2009, KiwiWriters put out an ebook collection of stories from the challenge named The KiwiWriters Challenge Collection. It features 7 short stories from participants.

== See also ==
- NaNoWriMo
