= Bonnie Bowman =

Canadian writer

- Occupation: novelist
- Writing career
- Period: 2000s–present
- Notable works: Skin, Spaz

Bonnie Bowman is a Canadian writer, who won the Three-Day Novel Contest in 1999 and the ReLit Award for Fiction in 2000 for her debut novel Skin.

Originally from Toronto, Ontario, Bowman lived for several years in British Columbia, where she worked as a journalist for publications including the Esquimalt News. Her second novel, Spaz, was published in 2010, and her writing has also been published in The Vancouver Review, subTerrain and Reader's Digest, and in the anthologies Exact Fare Only I and Body Breakdowns.

She is currently based in Toronto, where she also performs as a musician.
