= Three-Day Novel Contest =

Canadian literary contest

The Three-Day Novel Contest is an annual Canadian literary contest conducted in September of each year. The contest, which is open to writers from anywhere in the world, gives entrants three days to write a novel. Writers are permitted to plan and outline their novel in advance, but the actual writing cannot begin until the contest's opening date, which is traditionally on Labour Day weekend.

The entries are then judged by a panel, which announces its winning selection early in the following year, and the winning novel is published by a Canadian independent publisher.

The contest began in a Vancouver bar in 1977, where a handful of writers sat around bragging about their literary prowess. The tough-talk eventually led to a challenge: Go home and write an entire novel in three days. None of them managed to produce a book that first year, but the next Labour Day weekend the challenge was thrown down again, to an even larger group. The challenge was repeated the following year—and this time it produced a novel worth publishing: Dr. Tin by Toronto playwright Tom Walmsley. From that point forward, a small publishing house named Arsenal Pulp Press ran the contest, took it international, and published one winner every year.

In the late 1980s, Arsenal Pulp passed the torch to Anvil Press, which, 15 years later, passed it on to another small press. That publisher folded the same year, which seemed to mean the end of the contest. But a couple of fans of the Three-Day Novel agreed to rescue it; they put in hundreds of volunteer hours to set it up and manage it as an independent organization, which they maintained for nine years. In 2013, they passed on management of the contest to the Geist Foundation and the job of publishing the winning novel to Anvil Press.

In 2006, the Three-Day Novel Contest became the subject of a reality television program under the auspices of BookTelevision, a Canadian specialty channel produced by CHUM Limited. Twelve writers lived and worked in Chapters Southpoint, a bookstore in Edmonton, Alberta, composing novels before bemused customers and a national audience.

About five to six hundred writers enter the contest every year, about two-thirds of whom manage to complete and submit a novel. To date, the contest has had three repeat winners: Bradley Harris, a writer from Memphis, Tennessee, won in 1998 with Ruby Ruby and again in 2012 with Thorazine Beach; Shannon Mullally was co-winner with Meghan Austin in 2004 for Love Block and won as a solo writer in 2017 for The Second Detective; Pat Dobie won in 1988 for Pawn to Queen, and in 2022 for The Tenants.

One winning novel, Marc Diamond's Momentum, was also a shortlisted finalist for the Books in Canada First Novel Award.

== Winners ==
- 1979 – Tom Walmsley, Dr. Tin (ISBN 0-88978-254-7)
- 1981 – Ray Serwylo, Accordion Lessons (ISBN 0-88978-122-2)
- 1982 – bpNichol, Still (ISBN 0-88978-146-X)
- 1983 – Jeff Doran, This Guest of Summer (ISBN 0-88978-151-6)
- 1984 – Jim Curry, Nothing So Natural (ISBN 0-88978-167-2)
- 1985 – Marc Diamond, Momentum (ISBN 0-88978-179-6)
- 1986 – Candas Jane Dorsey and Nora Abercrombie, Hardwired Angel (ISBN 0-88978-190-7)
- 1987 – James Dunn, Starting Small (ISBN 0-88978-195-8)
- 1988 – Pat Dobie, Pawn to Queen (ISBN 0-88978-209-1)
- 1989 – Stephen E. Miller, Wastefall (ISBN 0-88978-220-2)
- 1990 – Bill Dodds, O Father (ISBN 0-88978-229-6)
- 1992 – Hayden Trenholm, Circle of Birds (ISBN 1-895636-03-5)
- 1993 – Steve Lundin and Mitch Parry, Stolen Voices/Vacant Rooms (ISBN 1-895636-06-X)
- 1995 – Loree Harrell, Body Speaking Words (ISBN 1-895636-09-4)
- 1996 – Todd Klinck, Tacones (ISBN 1-895636-14-0)
- 1997 – P. G. Tarr, The Underwood (ISBN 1-895636-17-5)
- 1998 – Bradley Harris, Ruby Ruby (ISBN 1-895636-23-X)
- 1999 – Bonnie Bowman, Skin (ISBN 1-895636-32-9)
- 2000 – Chris Millis, Small Apartments (ISBN 1-895636-35-3)
- 2001 – David Zimmerman, Socket (ISBN 1-895636-42-6)
- 2002 – Geoffrey Bromhead, Struck (ISBN 1-895636-53-1)
- 2003 - Steve Dodds, "Fiddlesticks" (Subsequently Disqualified) (ASIN B0CGZT9H1Y)
- 2004 – Meghan Austin and Shannon Mullally, Love Block (ISBN 1-55152-194-6)
- 2005 – Jan Underwood, Day Shift Werewolf (ISBN 1-55152-208-X)
- 2006 – Brendan McLeod, The Convictions of Leonard McKinley (ISBN 978-1-55152-222-7)
- 2007 – John Kupferschmidt, In the Garden of Men (ISBN 978-1-55152-239-5)
- 2008 – Jason Rapczynski, The Videographer (ISBN 978-1-55152-252-4)
- 2009 – Mark Sedore, Snowmen (ISBN 978-1-55152-366-8)
- 2010 – Jennifer K. Chung, Terroryaki! (ISBN 978-1-55152-412-2 / ebook ISBN 978-1-55152-464-1)
- 2011 – Kayt Burgess, Heidegger Stairwell (ISBN 978-1-55152-486-3 / ebook ISBN 978-1-55152-487-0)
- 2012 – Bradley Harris, Thorazine Beach (ISBN 978-1-927380-54-3)
- 2013 – Rachel Slansky, Moss-Haired Girl (ISBN 978-1-77214-002-6)
- 2014 – Craig Savel, Traversing Leonard’s Bubbles (ISBN 978-1-77214-033-0)
- 2015 – Doug Diaczuk, Chalk (ISBN 978-1-77214-078-1)
- 2016 – Mark Wagstaff, Attack of the Lonely Hearts (ISBN 978-1-77214-103-0)
- 2017 – Shannon Mullally, The Second Detective (ISBN 978-1-77214-128-3)
- 2018 – Daniel Sanders, The Loop (ISBN 978-1-77214-170-2)
- 2019 – Doug Diaczuk, Just Like a Real Person (ISBN 978-1-77214-176-4)
- 2020 – Emma Côté, Unrest
- 2021 – Benjamin Fidler, Gone to Pieces
- 2022 – Pat Dobie, The Tenants
- 2023 – Mark Wagstaff, So We Blush Less When The Phone Rings
- 2024 – Nathalie De Los Santos, Debt of the Heart

== See also ==
- Lune Spark Young Writers' Short Story Contest
- National Kids-in-Print Book Contest for Students
- National Novel Writing Month
- PBS Kids Writers Contest
