= Maddie Baillio =

American actress and singer

- Born: Madelyn Marie Baillio; February 15, 1996 (age 29); Lake Jackson, Texas, U.S.
- Education: Marymount Manhattan College
- Occupation(s): Actress, singer
- Years active: 2016–present
- Known for: Hairspray Live!, Dumplin'

Maddie Baillio (born February 15, 1996) is an American actress and singer who appeared in the television special Hairspray Live and the film Dumplin'.

During the COVID-19 pandemic, Baillio focused on her health. She became a vegan and started working out, ultimately shedding around 150 pounds over a two-year period. In 2022, she made her New York concert debut with a performance at Birdland Jazz Club.

== Early life and education ==
Baillio started her passion for singing and dancing when she was eight. She studied musical theatre at Marymount Manhattan College. In 2016, she moved to Los Angeles when she got the role of Tracy in Hairspray Live!, which made her screen debut.

== Filmography ==
Year	Title	Role	Notes
2016	Hairspray Live!	Tracy Turnblad	Television film
2018	Dumplin'	Millie Mitchellchuck	
2021	Cinderella	Malvolia	
2021	The Raso Life Story	Frandy	

== Stage ==
In 2022 Baillio was part of the reading of the musical adaptation of Smash, joining Broadway veterans Megan Hilty, Krysta Rodriguez, Brooks Ashmanskas and Beth Leavel.
