= Side Effects May Vary =

- First edition
- Author: Julie Murphy
- Audio read by: Cassandra Campbell; Kirby Heyborne
- Language: English
- Published: 2014
- Publisher: Balzer + Bray
- Publication place: United States
- Media type: Print (hardback, paperback), e-book, audiobook
- Pages: 336 pages
- ISBN: 006224535X
- Followed by: Dumplin'

Side Effects May Vary is a 2014 young adult novel and the literary debut of Julie Murphy. The book was first published in hardback by Balzer + Bray on March 18, 2014 and a paperback edition was released the following year. An audiobook narration was performed by Cassandra Campbell and Kirby Heyborne. Side Effects May Vary focuses on a teenager that has been recently diagnosed with leukemia and has decided to take revenge on her enemies.

Murphy wrote the book as part of National Novel Writing Month around 2010. While writing Murphy chose to have her character of Alice behave in a way that she felt might alienate some readers, justifying this decision by stating that "A book is always going to be about the best or worst part of a character’s life. Sometimes we shine. Sometimes we don’t. Alice definitely does not, but by the end she’s begun to find her road to redemption."

== Synopsis ==
Alice is sixteen and has been diagnosed with leukemia. She's been warned that she may not have long to live, so Alice has decided that she's going to use her remaining time in order to accomplish things she's always wanted to do, even if doing so may come across as cruel or unkind. Her friend Harvey has agreed to assist her during this process and together the two manage to exact revenge on her ex-boyfriend and enemies, while also taking part in positive things like revisiting her past. However just as she's managed to complete her plans for revenge, Alice discovers that she's in remission - and will live. Now she has to deal with the fallout from her actions and try to find a way to deal with what she's done and her complicated feelings for Harvey, who has always loved her.

== Reception ==
Critical reception for Side Effects May Vary has been mixed and the book has received praise from the School Library Journal and Booklist. The Horn Book Guide and Commonsensemedia were both mixed in their opinions, as they enjoyed the work but felt that the shifting between past and present could be seen as confusing or excessive. The Horn Book Guide also stated that the book had the potential to appeal to fans of The Fault in Our Stars.
