= Renegades (novel) =

2017 novel written by Marissa Meyer

- First edition
- Author: Marissa Meyer
- Cover artist: Robert Ball
- Language: English
- Series: The Renegades Trilogy
- Genre: Science fiction, superhero
- Publisher: Feiwel & Friends
- Publication date: November 7, 2017
- Publication place: United States
- Pages: 559
- ISBN: 9781529023114
- OCLC: 1004576237
- Followed by: Archenemies

Renegades is a dystopian science fiction novel by American author Marissa Meyer about a syndicate of prodigies with super human abilities and the first book in the Renegades trilogy. It was first published in the United States on November 7, 2017, by Feiwel & Friends, an imprint of Macmillan Children's Publishing Group, and was succeeded by Archenemies. It became a No. 2 New York Times bestseller two weeks after its release.

== Synopsis ==
=== Premise ===
Renegades follows Nova (anarchist alias: Nightmare), the niece of the Anarchist leader, Alec Artino (alias: Ace Anarchy). Alec takes Nova in after her parents are viciously murdered by another villain gang before the civil war, and was raised by the Anarchists. She can put people to sleep with skin-to-skin contact, and since her parents' murder, she has not slept at all. She wants revenge on the Renegades for not protecting her parents as promised, and leads an infiltration into their headquarters by posing as a Renegade-in-training under the alias 'Insomnia'.

It also follows Adrian, the son of the leaders of the Renegades, Hugh Everhart and Simon Westwood. He was adopted by the two leaders after his mother, another member of the core-Renegades, was killed. He brings Nova onto his team at Renegades headquarters.

=== Setting ===
Renegades takes place in Gatlon City (a fictional city), in the aftermath of a civil war between the Renegades and the Anarchists known as the Battle of Gatlon. The war began when Ace Anarchy, tired of living in a world where prodigies were oppressed by society, used his immense power to tear down all societies across the world in a very short span of time. He ruled this chaotic world for a time until the Renegades rose up and managed to defeat him. Both are groups of people with superpowers, known as prodigies, in which some were born with powers with numerous capabilities while others got their powers through freak accidents. The Renegades consider themselves superheroes—fighting for the greater good. The Anarchists are the most powerful of many villain gangs, and consider themselves the super-villains. The Renegades have defeated the Anarchists, and the remaining Anarchists after the civil war live in the old tunnel of the city's subway system, in order to live their lives under the Renegades' rule.

== Plot ==
10 years before the events of the book, 6-year-old Nova Artino watches as her parents and baby sister are killed by a villain gang's hitman, and hears him shoot her baby sister, Evie—dead. However, before he can shoot her, she uses her gift of putting people to sleep to cause him to faint. Her uncle Alec comes and reveals to Nova he is Ace Anarchy, the leader of the Anarchists, before killing the hitman.

Ten years later, Ace is now dead, having been killed in the Battle for Gatlon, and Nova is at a Renegade parade, on a secret anarchist mission to kill Captain Chromium. She believes that, because he is invincible, the only way to kill him is to shoot him directly in the eye with a poison dart. While at the parade, a young prodigy steals a bracelet that was made by Nova's father. But Adrian, the biological son of one of the Renegades' founders, gets it back, and fixes the broken clasp on it with his ability to bring to life whatever he draws. Later, Nova disguises herself as her alias, Nightmare, to kill the Captain. But after a moment of hesitation, Nova fails to hit the Captain's eye. After a brief struggle with several Renegades, including Danna Bell (Monarch), and Ruby Tucker (Red Assassin), someone in an armored suit comes to face off against Nightmare: the Sentinel, who is later revealed to be Adrian. During the fight, the Puppeteer (Winston Pratt) intervenes, which results in his capture and Nightmare's escape.

Adrian returns to Renegade headquarters to find his adoptive fathers Hugh Everhart (Captain Chromium) and Simon Westwood (the Dread Warden), two of the founding members of the Renegades. Adrian's adoptive brother Max (the Bandit) is introduced, but has been quarantined his whole life due to his uncontrollable ability to absorb others superpowers. Adrian struggles hiding his identity as the Sentinel from everyone, but decides to investigate the Anarchists for the attack on the parade. Nova returns to the tunnels where she and the remaining Anarchists (Cyanide, Queen Bee, Phobia and the Detonator) reside. A cruel Renegade squadron visits them and almost kills Ingrid Thompson (Detonator), but the Sentinel arrives and stops them, lying about being under orders from the Renegade council. The Sentinel eventually leaves the Anarchists alone, and Cyanide has the idea to have Nova recruited by the Renegades as a spy due to her inability to sleep being unknown. With the help of a prodigy named Millie, Nova and Cyanide create a fake identity known as Nova McLain (Insomnia), and Nova enters the Renegade tryouts. Frostbite, whose team attacked the Anarchists before, challenges her to prove her worth, but Nova instead fights and defeats Gargoyle, a member of Frostbite's team who can turn into a stone-like monster, and is immediately recruited into Adrian's team.

Nova's first mission as part of Adrian's team involves staking out a library run by Gene Cronin (The Librarian), a weapons dealer to the Anarchists. Nova informs the Anarchists, attracting the attention of Ingrid. During the stakeout, Nova bonds with the team, particularly with Adrian. The next day, the team goes into the library after seeing Ingrid enter, meeting Cronin's mirror-walking granddaughter, Narcissa. Ingrid exposes Cronin to the Renegades and kills him, setting fire to the library. Narcissa escapes and Adrian vanishes, but the Sentinel saves Nova from the chaos. Captain Chromium and Tsunami put out the fire and find an unharmed Adrian. Later that day, the Renegades invade the Anarchists' tunnels, but they manage to escape to Nova's fake apartment.

Adrian's team, including Nova, questions Winston Pratt, who covers for Nova by saying Ace found Nightmare at Cosmopolis Amusement Park. Adrian introduces Nova to Max, and she begins to take a liking to them both. However, Max injures himself inside his quarantine and Nova rushes in to save him, then Adrian rushes in to save Nova from losing her powers. Max is treated and Nova and Adrian's powers remain intact. Max later implies to Adrian that he knows his identity as the Sentinel. Nova inspects artifacts from the Renegades' past and learns that Ace Anarchy's helmet, created by her father to amplify his power, could not be destroyed.

Ingrid comes up with the idea to fake hers and Nightmare's death to catch the Renegades off guard. Nova reluctantly helps with the plan, taking Adrian with her on a Nightmare investigation at Cosmopolis Park, where the two begin to become enamored with each other. The two enter an abandoned fun house so Nova and Ingrid can stage Nightmare's death. Nightmare appears to fight Ingrid in front of Adrian, and Ingrid destroys the fun house, apparently killing Nightmare. Outside, Ingrid realizes Adrian is the Sentinel. The entire Renegade council arrives and Ingrid prepares to destroy all of Cosmopolis Park with her bombs with them in it, but Nova finally shoots her dead.

In the aftermath, Adrian implies to Nova that the entire trip was a date between them. Nova becomes nervous and runs off. She goes to the Cathedral where Ace was killed. Inside the cathedral, Nova says that the helmet is still intact, and a still-alive but weak Ace praises her for her actions.

== Publicity ==
Publicity for Renegades included social media posts on Meyer's Twitter account, chapter releases, as well as a cover reveal with the LA Times. There was also heavy use of the hashtags #JointheRenegades and #WinRenegades, book giveaways, and book swag such as sunglasses, pens, slap bracelets, and at conferences such as BookExpo. In anticipation for the release date there were multiple giveaways, one for a Renegades-themed trip to YallFest, a chance to have your own character featured in the Renegades sequel, and a photo contest to win an advanced copy of the book. Two limited-edition exclusive editions of the novel were produced and released through Target and Barnes & Noble. Meyer also offered a pre-order incentive, where those who pre-ordered the novel could submit their receipt and receive exclusive Renegades-themed buttons.

An entire website was created dedicated to the novel, and the pages are slowly added in order to tease fans and get them excited for the novel's release. On October 3, 2017, a Facebook Live event took place in which fans could ask Meyer questions, and hear her read an excerpt from the novel.

== Sequels ==
Two sequels have been released; Archenemies was published on December 14, 2018, and the final installment in the trilogy, Supernova, was released on October 29, 2019. About a fourth novel, Meyer said that she didn't "currently have plans to write more in the Renegades universe".

== Reception ==
Publishers Weekly gave it a starred review on October 9, calling it, "a strikingly grounded story of star-crossed would-be lovers, deception, and the recognition that most of humanity exists between the extremes of good and evil". Common Sense Media rated the book at four stars, writing "Slow start, but much intrigue in supervillain/hero tale."

Renegades hit the New York Times bestseller list for Young Adult Hardcovers at number 2 the week of November 26, 2017.
