= Cress (novel) =

2014 novel by Marissa Meyer

- Book cover of Cress
- Author: Marissa Meyer
- Cover artist: Michael O
- Language: English
- Series: The Lunar Chronicles
- Genre: Young adult, Romance, Science fiction, Dystopian
- Publisher: Feiwel & Friends
- Publication date: February 4, 2014
- Publication place: United States
- Media type: Print (hardcover and paperback), audiobook, e-book
- Pages: 550
- ISBN: 978-0-312-64297-6
- OCLC: 865010316
- LC Class: PZ7.M571737 Cre 2014b
- Preceded by: Scarlet
- Followed by: Winter

Cress is a 2014 young adult science fiction novel written by American author Marissa Meyer and published by Macmillan Publishers through their subsidiary Feiwel & Friends. It is the third novel in The Lunar Chronicles series and the sequel to Scarlet. It is followed by the fourth novel in the series, titled Winter. The story is loosely based on the fairy tale of "Rapunzel", similar to its predecessors Cinder and Scarlet which were loosely based on "Cinderella" and "Little Red Riding Hood" respectively.

== Plot ==
The novel begins with an introduction to Crescent "Cress" Moon Darnel, a sixteen-year-old girl living in a satellite in Space that has been her prison for most of her life. She is contacted by Linh Cinder, the protagonist of the first novel, and her crew on Thorne's spaceship, the Rampion, through the D-COMM chip that had made Nainsi, Kai's former tutor/personal android, malfunction in the first book (Cress is the same girl who had warned Cinder about Levana's ulterior motives of marrying Kai).

After communicating with Cinder's crew, she asks them to rescue her, which they say they will do. However, an unexpected visit from Head Thaumaturge Sybil Mira, who is Cress's guardian/captor, throws a wrench into the plans as she discovers Cress' intent to run and plans a trap for Cinder's crew. The trap results in the capture of Scarlet, the protagonist of the previous novel, and love interest of Wolf. Jacin Clay, a pilot who brought Sybil to Cress's satellite, decides to join Cinder's side, while the almost fatal wounding of Wolf renders him unconscious, and Sybil leaves Thorne and Cress to die after shutting down her satellite, making it hurtle toward Earth without a way to stop it. Meanwhile in Africa, Dr. Erland has made a discovery.

The crew has now been separated from one another and Cinder is sure that not only are Cress and Thorne certainly dead, but that Scarlet will soon share the same fate, as will Wolf if she doesn't get him medical attention. Cinder decides to land the Rampion in Africa where she was to meet Dr. Erland. She speaks with him, and he reveals that Lunars are able to contract a mutated version of the deadly virus that has been killing many Earthens for more than a decade.

During this time, Scarlet is being held at an aristocratic Lunar household, being forced to be a "pet" for a young boy to practice his gift on. She is brought back to the palace, tried, and forced to cut off her own pinky finger.

After Cress manages to deploy the parachutes of the free-falling satellite, they ensure a safe landing in the Sahara Desert. Unfortunately, Thorne has been blinded after hitting his head during the fall, and Cress must get him and herself out of the desert and somehow communicate with Cinder and the crew of the Rampion. Ever since she began tracking Thorne on assignment from Sybil Mira, Cress has been infatuated with him, and believes him to be her perfect hero. Thorne tries to convince her that he is not the hero she imagined, but promises her that if they are about to die, he will kiss her.

They nearly die of heat exhaustion, dehydration, and starvation, but are saved by a traveling group of people who sell wares, who are later revealed to be Lunar traffickers. They go to a hotel with the group, where Thorne manages to win an escort-droid in a card game. Cress, distraught and believing Thorne is "cheating" on her with another woman, decides to leave with the traffickers who had originally saved them. They kidnap Cress and take her to Dr. Erland, her father who believed her to be dead, as she was taken away as a newborn to be killed. Cress becomes terrified and runs to hide, unknowingly hiding in the same room that Wolf is being kept in. She is discovered shortly after, and Thorne arrives to save her. A while later, the group is discovered and forced out of hiding. The villagers (consisting of multiple Lunars) assist them in glamouring the military, aiding in Cinder and her group's escape.

Once the entire group is reunited, Cinder plans an infiltration of the castle to stop the royal wedding between Earthen Emperor Kai and Lunar Queen Levana, even though she knows it will start a war. She goes back home to see her stepmother, Linh Adri, and her stepsister, Pearl, and glamours herself in order to steal their invitations. Cress and Wolf sneak into the palace, posing as a couple with the stolen invitations. Cinder and Iko (now in the body of the escort-droid Thorne won) sneak in through abandoned walkways. Thorne and Dr. Erland head to the labs to create stem cell eyedrops to repair Thorne's vision. While Cress and Wolf dismantle the security operations for the wedding site, Cinder and Iko kidnap Emperor Kai by tranquilizing him and cutting out his ID chips, with the help of Konn Torin. Dr. Erland manages to repair Thorne's vision, but diagnoses himself with the fatal disease letumosis. After stopping the wedding, Cinder plans to take the crew to Luna, declare herself as the missing Princess Selene, and get the Lunars to rally around her to dethrone Levana.

Dr. Erland quarantines himself after realizing he has been infected, telling Cress that he is her father and that he loves her and never wanted to abandon her before he dies. Shortly after, Queen Levana and Sybil Mira come to see Dr. Erland. Sybil receives an anonymous tip that the group is headed for the roof, preparing to leave. Before the party can leave, they are stopped by Sybil Mira and Lunar soldiers, and Jacin is nowhere to be found. During the battle, Thorne kisses Cress, fulfilling the promise he made to her and also hinting that he has started to develop feelings for her. Cinder and Sybil Mira battle it out, and Cinder succeeds in breaking Mira's mind and driving her insane, which leads to her jumping off the roof to her death. They fly the Rampion en route to Luna, and Queen Levana retaliates by openly declaring war on Earth.

It is also revealed that Princess Winter, the stepdaughter of Queen Levana, has Scarlet in her zoo-like menagerie. She is mentally unstable (afflicted with Lunar Sickness) due to the fact that she refuses to use her Lunar gifts, but tells Scarlet that she is on Scarlet's side.

== Characters ==
- Crescent "Cress" Moon Darnel: A prisoner in the beginning of the book, this character resembles Rapunzel from the fairy-tale genre, with long, blonde hair and a lifetime of being isolated in a prison by a witch. After being cast down to Earth and presumed dead, Cress travels with Thorne for many days to reunite with Cinder and the rest of the crew. She is exceptionally gifted at programming and hacking, having been the queen's programmer for many years. In the first book, she is the girl that warns Cinder about Levana's ulterior motives.
- Carswell Thorne: A citizen of the American Republic, Thorne is wanted by several governments for crimes he has committed, the last of which was breaking out of prison with Cinder in the novel Scarlet. In this book, he is blinded and stays that way for the rest of the novel. He is arrogant yet Cress has feelings for him and consistently sees the good in him.
- Linh Cinder: A young female cyborg mechanic and main protagonist in The Lunar Chronicles. Revealed as the Lunar Princess Selene in Cinder, she is the missing heir to the throne of Luna and niece of Queen Levana.
- Emperor Kaito: Emperor of the Eastern Commonwealth. He is engaged to Queen Levana but is in love with Cinder and is only marrying the Queen of Luna to save the lives of his people.
- Dr. Erland/ Dr. Sage Darnel: Lunar fugitive that took care of Cinder in the first book after spending many years looking for her. His disguised last name is an anagram of his real last name. He dies from a mutated version of the Letumosis virus in this novel. He is also the father of Cress and believed her to be dead since she was taken from him. He reveals himself as her father to her as he is dying. He dies when Queen Levana finally discovers he's located on Earth and comes to visit him and tell him that she will be crowned empress.
- Jacin Clay: The pilot who brings Sybil Mira to Cress' satellite. He is glamoured by Mira to look like Scarlet to confuse Cinder's side during the battle, but decides to join Cinder's side halfway through Scarlet's kidnapping. He is concerned with Princess Winter's fate and will do anything to protect her.
- Ze'ev "Wolf" Kesley: A genetically-modified former Lunar special operative that is Scarlet's love interest. After Scarlet is kidnapped, he falls into a deep depression over being unable to save her.
- Sybil Mira: Cress's captor who forced Cress to do Queen Levana's bidding for many years. She is Queen Levana's right hand and has complete loyalty to Levana. Goes mad at the end due to Cinder's Lunar manipulation and throws herself off a roof.
- Iko: Cinder's android partner. She is given a new android body by Thorne when he meets up with them again and she is in love with it.
- Queen Levana: The cruel queen of Luna, the moon colony. Not above using terrorist and genocidal tactics to obtain power, she is partially responsible for the existence of the plague on Earth since many of her subjects flee there to escape her influence. She uses a powerful glamour to force people to do her bidding. She is based on the Evil Queen of Snow White's history.
- Scarlet Benoit: Previous protagonist who joined Cinder, Wolf, Thorne, and later, Cress, to stop Queen Levana from marrying Emperor Kai. She is kidnapped by Sybil Mira and her life is saved by Princess Winter.
- Princess Winter: The step-daughter of Queen Levana, who has a marred face rumored to be forced upon herself at thirteen because she was more beautiful than the Queen. She has become slightly crazy because she has refused to use her Lunar gifts since she was twelve.
