= Marissa Meyer =

American novelist (born 1984)

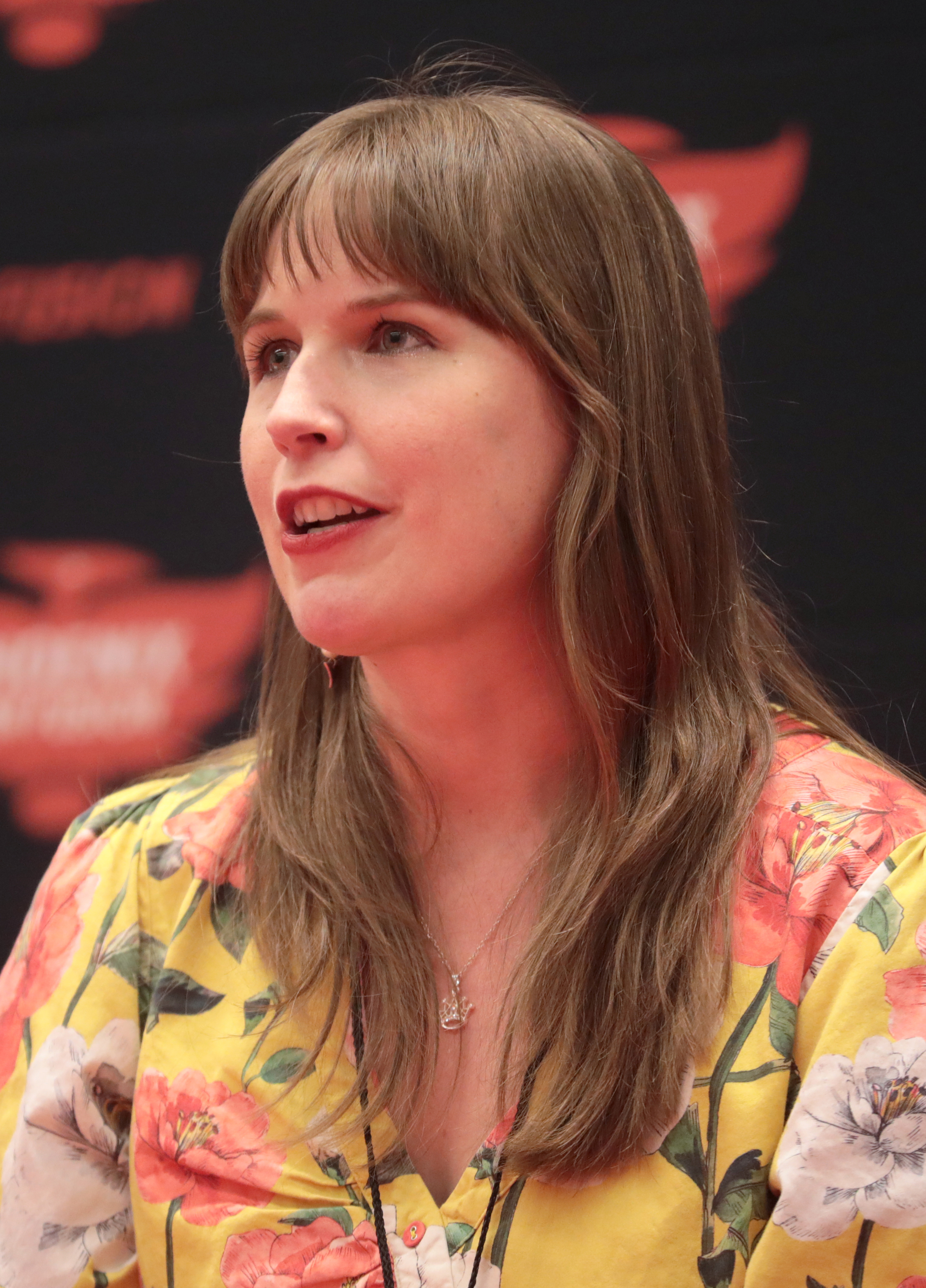
- Meyer at the 2022 Phoenix Fan Fusion
- Born: Marissa Meyer; February 19, 1984 (age 42); Tacoma, Washington, U.S.
- Education: Pacific Lutheran University (BA)
- Occupation: Novelist
- Spouse: Jesse Taylor
- Children: 2
- Writing career
- Genre: Young adult fantasy science fiction romance
- Notable works: The Lunar Chronicles, Heartless
- Website: marissameyer.com

Marissa Meyer (born February 19, 1984) is an American novelist. A large portion of her bibliography is centered on retellings of fairy tales. She is best known for her series The Lunar Chronicles, which includes her 2012 debut novel, Cinder.

== Early life and education ==
Meyer was born in Tacoma, Washington and attended Pacific Lutheran University, where she received a Bachelors in Creative Writing and Children's Literature. She later attended Pace University and received a Master's in Publishing. Growing up, Meyer admits that she had a strong love for fairy tales and one of her favorite shows was Sailor Moon, both of which later impacted her creation of Cinder. Meyer also says that her love of superheroes helped lead to the creation of Renegades. In an interview with Los Angeles Times, she said she attempted her first novel when she was sixteen.

== Career ==
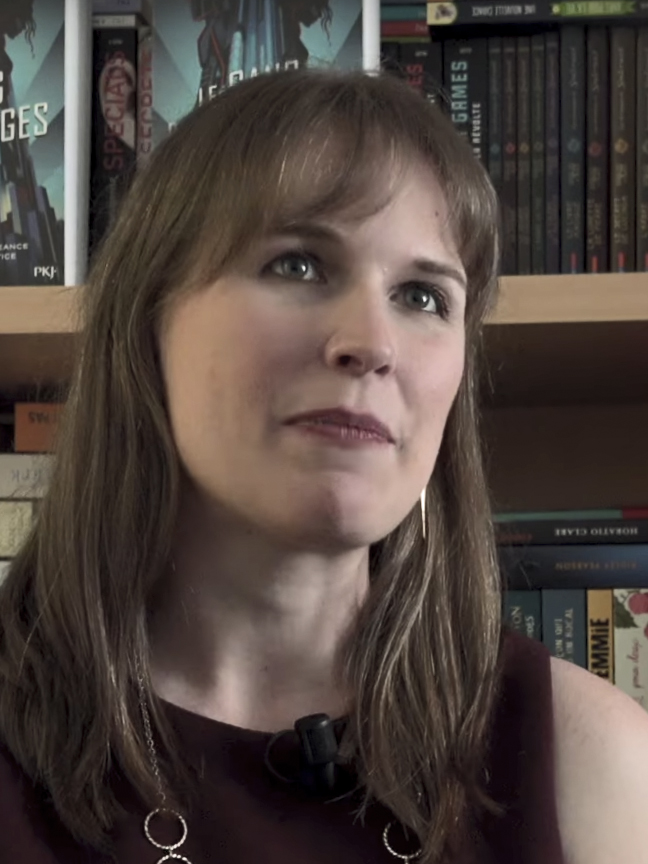
Marissa Meyer (Librairie Mollat, 2018)

Before writing the first Lunar Chronicles novel Cinder, Meyer wrote Sailor Moon fan fiction for ten years under the pen name of Alicia Blade. She also wrote a novelette titled The Phantom of Linkshire Manor under her pen name. In an interview with The News-Tribune, she said that writing fan fiction helped her learn the craft of writing, gave her instant feedback and taught her how to take criticism. After graduating from college and prior to writing Cinder, Meyer worked as a book editor and a freelance typesetter and proofreader.

Meyer states that she was initially inspired to write Cinder after participating in the 2008 National Novel Writing Month contest where she wrote a story focusing on a futuristic version of Puss in Boots. The idea came from a dream where Cinderella was a cyborg and her foot came off, instead of her shoe, at the ball. Meyer signed with agent Jill Grinberg, who is still her agent today. The Lunar Chronicles is a series of four young adult dystopian science fiction fantasy romantic novels that are based on the fairy tale stories of "Cinderella", "Little Red Riding Hood", "Rapunzel" and "Snow White". The series' first novel Cinder was a New York Times bestseller. As of 2015, the series had sold over 651,000 copies.

The animated feature film rights to The Lunar Chronicles were acquired by Warner Bros. Pictures, Locksmith Animation and Warner Bros. Pictures Animation in January 2022.

In 2013, Meyer received a two-book deal from Feiwel & Friends for a young adult series featuring the Queen of Hearts from Alice in Wonderland. However, it later ended up being a standalone book called Heartless, which was released in Fall 2016. Utah students adapted the novel into a musical which Meyer attended in 2021.

Publishers Weekly announced that she would write a superhero series afterwards. The resulting trilogy of books is called Renegades, as is the first book in the series. It was inspired by the misreading of a sign and impacted by her love of superheroes growing up. Renegades was released in the November 2017, and became the number 2 book on the New York Times bestsellers in November.

In 2020, she released a standalone rom-com called Instant Karma, which was optioned for television by HBO Max in February 2021. With a Little Luck follows a side-character from Instant Karma and released early 2024.

Since 2020, she has hosted The Happy Writer with Marissa Meyer, a podcast in which she interviews authors about their work.

In November 2021, she released Gilded, a novel based on the story of Rumpelstiltskin, the first in a duology. It sold 9,000 copies in its first week, and was the top YA title when released. The second book in the series, Cursed, was released in November 2022.

Let It Glow, co-written with Joanne Levy, released on October 29, 2024.

The Happy Writer was published on January 28, 2025.

== Personal life ==
Meyer is married to Jesse Taylor. In 2015, she and her husband adopted two children. Together, they live in Tacoma, Washington, the place where Meyer grew up. Taylor is a carpenter and built Meyer a fairytale-esque writing studio in their backyard, complete with floor-to-ceiling bookshelves.

== Works ==
=== The Lunar Chronicles ===
- Cinder (2012)
- Scarlet (2013)
- Cress (2014)
- Winter (2015)

==== Related works ====
- Fairest (2015) – prequel
- Stars Above (2016) – anthology
- Wires and Nerve, Volume 1 (2017) – graphic novel, illustrated by Douglas Holgate
- Wires and Nerve, Volume 2: Gone Rogue (2018) – graphic novel, illustrated by Stephen Gilpin
- COVID-128 (2020) (short story)
- Cinder’s Adventure: Get Me to the Wedding! (2022) - interactive ebook
- The Lunar Chronicles Coloring Book (2016)

=== Renegades Trilogy ===
- Renegades (2017)
- Archenemies (2018)
- Supernova (2019)

=== Fortuna Beach series ===
- Instant Karma (2020)
- With a Little Luck (2024)

=== Gilded Series ===
- Gilded (2021)
- Cursed (2022)

=== Standalone novels ===
- Heartless (2016)
- Let It Glow (with Joanne Levy) (2024)
- The Happy Writer (2025) this is not a novel but, "part craft guide, part writing coach, and part cheerleader" according to the book blurb.
- We Could Be Magic (graphic novel, Illustrated by Joelle Murray) (2025)
- The House Saphir (2025)
- The Escape Game (with Tamara Moss) (2026)
- Here We Glow Again (with Joanne Levy) (2027)
- The Traitor Game (with Tamara Moss) (2027)

=== Short stories ===
- "Gold in the Roots of the Grass" in A Tyranny of Petticoats, edited by Jessica Spotswood (2016)
- "The Sea Witch" in Because You Love to Hate Me: 13 Tales of Villainy, edited by Amerie (2017)
- The Phantom of Linkshire Manor (2021)

=== Edited ===
- Serendipity: Ten Romantic Works, Transformed (2022)
