= Stephanie Garber =

American author

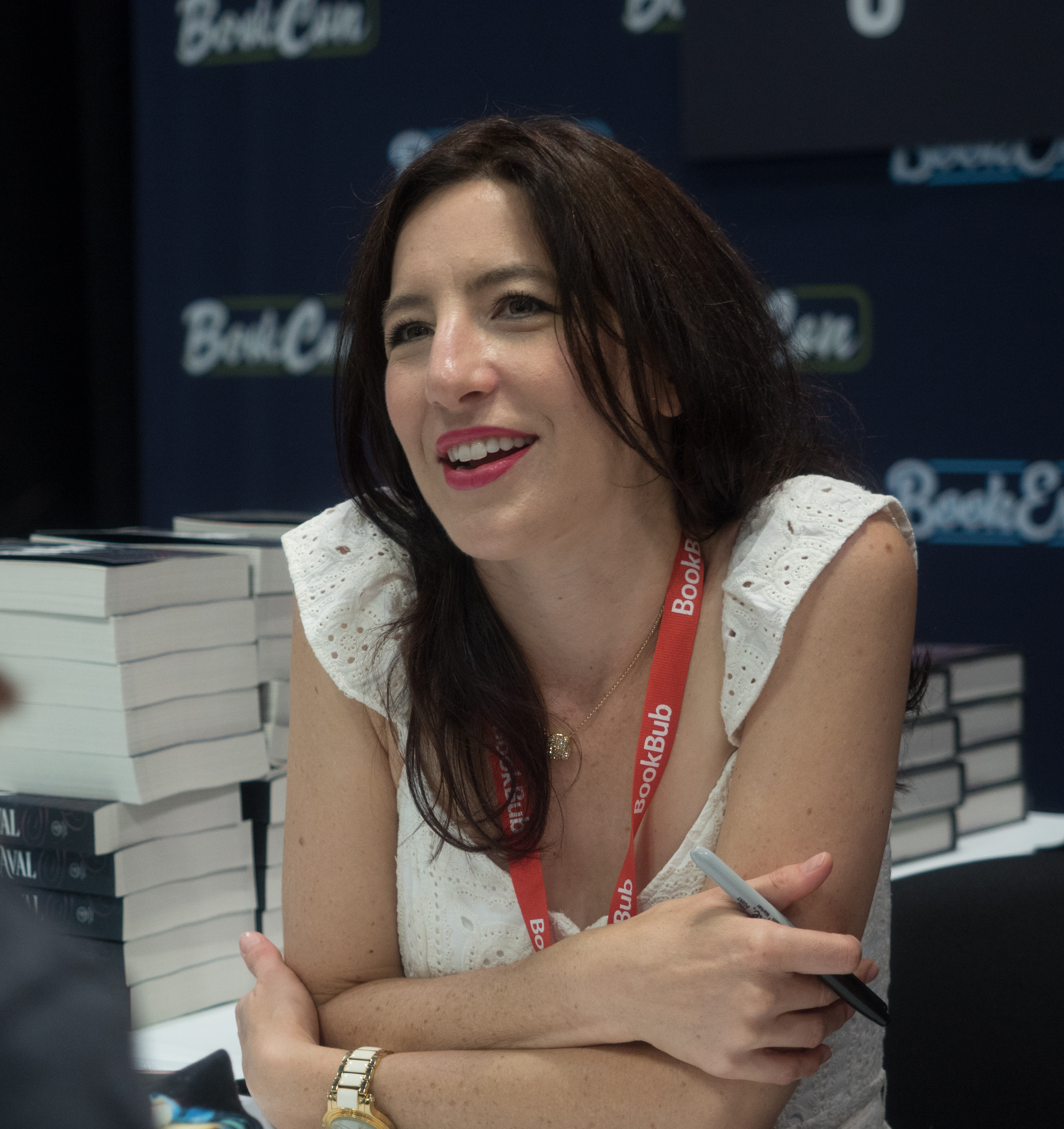
- Born: July 8, 1987 (age 39)
- Occupation: Author
- Writing career
- Years active: 2017–Present
- Notable works: Caraval trilogy; Once Upon a Broken Heart trilogy
- Website: stephaniegarberauthor.com

Stephanie Garber is an American author of young adult fiction known for the Caraval and Once Upon a Broken Heart which were interconnected trilogies.

== Writing career ==
Garber was a college resident director when she began writing in her spare time. She wrote several novels and received many rejections until her fourth book, a space opera, caught the interest of a literary agent. When the space opera failed to sell, Garber wrote Caraval. Garber has stated that she did not intend for Caraval to be the first book in a series or to be a romance when she started writing it. Two sequels, Legendary and Finale, complete the Caraval trilogy.

Her books have received mixed critical reception. Caraval received a starred review from Publishers Weekly, which stated, "intriguing characters, an imaginative setting, and evocative writing combine to create a spellbinding tale of love, loss, sacrifice, and hope", while Caitlin Paxson of NPR wrote that "ultimately, the message of Caraval ends up muddled." Caraval was on The New York Times Best Seller list for fifteen weeks, reaching No. 2. Film rights to Caraval were optioned by Twentieth Century Fox.

Legendary was on The New York Times bestseller list for eight weeks, peaking at No. 1. Kirkus Reviews criticized Legendary's "weak plot and ultraviolet prose" but praised it as "a tour de force of imagination." School Library Journal wrote, "While this second installment does not stand on its own—readers will need to be familiar with the characters, events, and world-building of the previous book to fully understand and appreciate this one—fans will be delighted to spend more time with Tella, Dante, and Scarlett, and to immerse themselves again into Garber's magical world".

The third book in the Caraval trilogy, Finale, was reviewed by Kirkus as "overwritten, with overly convenient worldbuilding that struggles nearly as much as the overwrought prose and convoluted plot".

Garber's novel Once Upon a Broken Heart, was published September 28, 2021. Kirkus Reviews wrote that it is, "a lushly written story with an intriguing heart". Publishers Weekly praised Garber's worldbuilding.

The Ballad of Never After was on the New York Times bestseller list for 16 weeks. Kirkus Reviews wrote that it is, "A disappointing delivery on a potentially gripping second volume."

== Works ==
=== Caraval trilogy ===
1. Caraval. Flatiron Books, 2017. ISBN 9781250095268
2. Legendary. Flatiron Books, 2018. ISBN 9781250095329
  - The Dragna sisters, Scarlett and Donatella, have escaped the dangerous game of Caraval and their father’s clutches however the games are just beginning. Unbeknownst to Scarlett, Tella made a deal for their freedom with an elusive man. The only problem is, Tella owes this mystery man the name of Caraval Master Legend which is something no person has ever been able to obtain. Her only chance to uncover his identity? To reenter the perilous game of Caraval and win once again. But to win sacrifices will be great, challenges and riddles will leave her questioning, and with freedom on the line she has everything to lose.
3. Finale. Flatiron Books, 2019. ISBN 9781250157683
- Spectacular. (novella), Flatiron Books, 2024 (illustrated by Rosie Fowinkle)

=== Once Upon a Broken Heart trilogy ===
This saga is set in the same universe of the Caraval trilogy.

1. Once Upon a Broken Heart. Flatiron Books, 2021. ISBN 9781250898326
2. The Ballad of Never After. Flatiron Books, 2022. ISBN 9781250268426
3. A Curse for True Love. Flatiron Books, 2023. ISBN 9781250908452
- The Mirror of Infinite Endings. (novella), Flatiron Books, 2026.

=== Alchemy of Secrets series ===
1. Alchemy of Secrets. Flatiron Books, 2025.

=== Standalone Works ===
- 26 Witches. Bookbaby, 2020.
