= Dumplin' =

2015 book by Julie Murphy

- Author: Julie Murphy
- Audio read by: Eileen Stevens
- Language: English
- Genre: Young adult/Romance
- Published: 2015
- Publisher: Balzer + Bray
- Publication place: United States
- Media type: Print, e-book, audiobook
- Pages: 375 pages
- ISBN: 0062327186
- Preceded by: Side Effects May Vary

Dumplin' is a 2015 young adult novel and the second book by the American author Julie Murphy. It was first published in hardback in the United States on September 15, 2015 through Balzer + Bray. An audiobook adaptation, narrated by Eileen Stevens, was released through Harper Audio. The book focuses on Willowdean "Dumplin'" Dickson, a plus-size teenager who finds love, but also realizes that she is more insecure about herself than she initially thought.

== Synopsis ==
Willowdean, nicknamed "Dumplin’" by her mother and called "Will" by her friends, is a plus-size teenager who has always felt comfortable with her body and herself. She doesn't care that her mother was a teen beauty queen or that people have poked fun at her weight. However, all of this changes when she meets Bo, a handsome teenage boy her age that has expressed interest in dating her. Suddenly, Will is full of insecurities and can't bring herself to date him out of fear of what others would think and say. In order to prove her self-worth, Will has decided to enter and win the Miss Teen Blue Bonnet Pageant. But, as the date of the pageant approaches, Will finds that it's not that easy to take part in a pageant — especially after her best friend Ellen decides to enter. Along the way, she faces issues in her friendship with Ellen.

== Reception ==
Critical reception for Dumplin' has been positive. Commonsensemedia and Entertainment Weekly both gave Dumplin' favorable reviews and both praised Murphy for writing about and through the lens of a plus size teen, "who is struggling with her weight only in terms of accepting it". The Chicago Tribune also wrote a favorable review, noting that, "If the book's ending is a little too Disney Channel optimistic, it's understandable — Willowdean deserves no less."

== Adaptation ==
The movie adaptation stars Danielle Macdonald as Willowdean and Jennifer Aniston as her mother, Rosie Dickson. The film was written by Kristin Hahn and directed by Anne Fletcher.
