= Scarlet (novel) =

2013 novel by Marissa Meyer

- Book cover of Scarlet
- Author: Marissa Meyer
- Cover artist: Michael O
- Language: English
- Series: The Lunar Chronicles
- Genre: Children, romance, science fiction, dystopian
- Publisher: Feiwel & Friends
- Publication date: February 5, 2013
- Publication place: United States
- Media type: Print (hardcover and paperback), audiobook, e-book
- Pages: 454
- ISBN: 978-0-312-64296-9
- OCLC: 805044396
- LC Class: PZ7.M571737 Sc 2013
- Preceded by: Cinder
- Followed by: Cress

Scarlet is a 2013 young adult science fiction novel written by American author Marissa Meyer and published by Macmillan Publishers through their subsidiary Feiwel & Friends. It is the second novel in The Lunar Chronicles series and the sequel to Cinder. The story is loosely based on the fairy tale of "Little Red Riding Hood," similar to Cinder, which was loosely based on "Cinderella." It is followed by the third novel Cress.

== Plot ==
After the events of the first book, Scarlet Benoit is an 18-year-old girl living on her grandmother's farm in the rural town of Rieux, France. Her grandmother, Michelle, has been missing for two weeks, and Scarlet is certain that she had been kidnapped, rather than left on her own or had killed herself, as the authorities believe. While delivering fresh goods to one of her loyal but unfriendly customers, her friend, Émilie Monfort, introduces her to a jittery, shy street fighter whose code name is Wolf, who saves her after she makes a speech defending Linh Cinder, the Lunar cyborg who caused chaos at the Eastern Commonwealth's annual peace ball. She notices a tattoo on his arm; a string of numbers and letters that initially have no meaning to her.

When she gets back from her job, her estranged father, Luc, is there and is desperately trying to find something. She questions him, noting he has burn marks all up his arms from being tortured, and he says that the same people who hurt him have her grandmother because she was supposedly hiding something. The one clue that he can remember is that the kidnappers had a tattoo on their forearm, similar to Wolf's. Scarlet heads out to question Wolf in a fight ring, where he defeats and almost kills the champion. The next morning Wolf comes by her farm and tells her that the tattoo stands for a group he used to be part of and that they are the ones who had kidnapped her grandmother. He decides to help Scarlet and they both embark on a trip to Paris.

On the train ride to Paris, Scarlet meets a young man called Ran, who Wolf seems to smell on her later. Later, when a Letumosis outbreak occurs on board, they jump off the train and continue their journey through the woods. While resting, Ran shows up and Scarlet realizes that he and Wolf already know each other and don't get along well, and Ran is eventually revealed to be Wolf's younger brother. Wolf fights with Ran and almost kills him until Scarlet shoots him in the arm. They leave Ran unconscious and get on another train to Paris, where Scarlet learns that her father has died. Throughout this time, Wolf and Scarlet start to develop romantic feelings for each other.

Meanwhile, Cinder teams up with Captain Carswell Thorne, a fellow American prisoner who stole a spaceship from the American Republic military, and they escape from New Beijing prison. Cinder passes out while trying to start up Thorne's stolen ship, and Thorne has to reboot her. They escape on the ship, a Rampion, but find problems with the autopilot. Cinder remembers that she has Iko's personality chip and inserts it. Once in space, Thorne asks Cinder where she wants to go, and even though Dr. Erland told her to go to Africa, she chooses to go look for Michelle Benoit, a woman connected to the missing Lunar Princess Selene (who happens to be Cinder) and who is also Scarlet's grandmother.

When Scarlet and Wolf arrive in Paris, he leads her to where her grandmother is being held, but he betrays her and reveals that he is a Lunar Special Operative, a bioengineered wolf-Lunar hybrid soldier who serves Queen Levana. Glamouring himself as her grandmother, Ran manipulates Scarlet into telling everything she knows about Princess Selene and why her grandma can't be manipulated. She recalls Linh Garan, the man who adopted Cinder after her surgery, talking to her grandmother, but doesn't know why she resists manipulation. Then, she is imprisoned.

At the same time, Cinder and Thorne land in Rieux and discover Michelle Benoit's shelter, where Cinder was held in a suspension animation tank for eight years and later turned into a cyborg. They go to Gilles's tavern but are found by the military after being tracked via her dead stepsister's ID chip, which Cinder still had with her. Trouble gets worse when the Lunar wolf soldiers start attacking, following Queen Levana's order. Barely escaping, Cinder tracks down Scarlet.

Wolf visits Scarlet in her cell and kisses her in order to give her an ID chip, which she uses to escape and go to her grandmother's cell. Michelle Benoit tells Scarlet that Cinder is Princess Selene and that she must find her. Her grandmother also tells her that Scarlet is the granddaughter of Logan Tanner, the doctor who spirited Selene to Earth and performed her cyborg surgery, and eventually killed himself after suffering many years of Lunar Sickness. Ran comes in and threatens her but her grandmother sacrifices herself to allow her to run away. However, after killing Michelle, Ran chases down Scarlet until Wolf appears and starts fighting with him, eventually killing him. Wolf then corners Scarlet and struggles with his thaumaturge's control, but is shot with a tranquilizer dart by Cinder, who thought he was harming Scarlet. Scarlet and Wolf reconcile, Wolf reasoning out that he was able to overpower his wolf killing instinct due to his overwhelming animal-like instinct to protect his mate, and Scarlet agrees to be his "alpha female." They all manage to escape in the Rampion with Cinder finally revealing to Thorne and Iko that she is Princess Selene.

Emperor Kai agrees to marry Queen Levana in order to stop the attacks against Earth.
