= Cinder (novel) =

2012 young adult science fiction novel by Marissa Meyer

- Book cover of Cinder
- Author: Marissa Meyer
- Cover artist: Rich Deas
- Language: English
- Series: The Lunar Chronicles
- Genre: Young adult, romance, science fiction, dystopian
- Publisher: Feiwel & Friends
- Publication date: January 3, 2012
- Publication place: United States
- Media type: Print (hardcover and paperback), audiobook, e-book
- Pages: 390
- ISBN: 978-0-312-64189-4
- OCLC: 714726042
- LC Class: PZ7.M571737 Cin 2012
- Followed by: Scarlet

Cinder is the 2012 debut young adult science fiction novel of American author Marissa Meyer, published by Macmillan Publishers through their subsidiary Feiwel & Friends. It is the first book in The Lunar Chronicles and is followed by Scarlet. The story is loosely based on the classic fairytale Cinderella. Cinder was selected as one of IndieBound's Kids' Next List for winter 2012.

== Plot ==
Linh Cinder is a sixteen-year-old girl under the guardianship of her cruel stepmother, Linh Adri, along with her two stepsisters, Linh Pearl and Linh Peony, the latter of which treats her as a close friend. As a cyborg, Cinder is discriminated against and often looked down upon by others, despite building up a reputation as the best mechanic in New Beijing.

While working as a mechanic at the marketplace, she meets the son of Emperor Rikan, Crown Prince Kai, who asks her to fix Nainsi, his former personal android. Cyborgs are treated as second class citizens, so Cinder hides her identity from Kai. Soon, Peony falls sick with letumosis - a disease for which there is no cure - after accompanying Cinder to a local junkyard to collect spare parts for a repair. In anger and desperation, knowing Cinder's adopted father had died of letumosis as well, Adri volunteers Cinder for plague research, from which no participant survives. When Cinder is injected with the strain of letumosis, it is discovered that she is immune to the disease. Dr. Erland, the head researcher, starts to do research on Cinder's immunity, which leads to research on Cinder's unique physiology, her cyborg implants, and eventually to Cinder's life prior to becoming a cyborg at the age of eleven, which Cinder has no memory of.

At the same time, Emperor Rikan dies of the plague, resulting in Prince Kai becoming Emperor of the Eastern Commonwealth at eighteen. There is pressure to create an alliance between the Earth countries and the Moon country, Luna, led by the tyrannical and manipulative Queen Levana. The Lunars have the ability to manipulate the bioelectricity of people around them and make them see what they want them to see and even control their thoughts and actions. The proposed alliance is through Emperor Kai marrying Queen Levana, however, Emperor Kai wants to thwart this plan by finding someone else to marry first. He is also searching for information regarding the missing Lunar heir, Princess Selene, the daughter of Queen Channary Blackburn, Levana's late sister, who was said to have died in a fire in her nursery when she was three but a body was never found; which was what his android was researching before it broke. Earthens believed that somehow Princess Selene survived the nursery fire. To bribe Kai into going through with the marriage, Levana brings one vial of the letumosis antidote, which Cinder attempts to save Peony with, but is too late. Instead, she gives it to a little boy named Chang Sunto who recovers from letumosis, making headline news. After Peony's death, Cinder stores Peony's ID chip and takes it with her after discovering that the victims' chips are harvested after their deaths for an unknown reason. Angered by Peony's death, Linh Adri punishes Cinder by smashing Iko, Cinder's companion android and friend, to pieces and selling the valuable pieces, leaving only Iko's personality chip, and banning Cinder from going to the annual peace ball.

Dr. Erland reveals to Cinder that she is Lunar, resulting in her immunity to letumosis. However, Cinder displays no Lunar abilities, making her a "shell", or a Lunar without any bioelectricity or manipulation abilities. Dr. Erland also reveals that he is a Lunar fugitive who has been living on Earth. He had turned against Luna after his own newborn shell daughter had been taken away per the Lunar shell infanticide laws, as shells cannot control or be controlled by the Lunar abilities and are thus supposedly a threat to Lunars. Cinder fixes Nainsi and discovers that he and Nainsi have been researching Princess Selene, who is believed to have been killed by her aunt, Levana, when she was a child in order to eliminate her only threat to the throne. Cinder also discovers a Lunar direct communication chip embedded in Nainsi, which was the reason for the android's initial breakdown. Through the Lunar chip, which is revealed to be used for direct communication outside the network, Cinder is contacted by a Lunar girl - revealed in the third novel to be Cress - who warns that Levana intends to marry Kai and kill him after she becomes empress.

The story culminates with the peace ball, which Cinder crashes but is then revealed and announced to be Kai's personal guest. Cinder warns Kai about Levana's ulterior motives and tells him to call off any wedding plans, but Levana intervenes and points out that Cinder is a Lunar shell fugitive, and should be taken into custody for trial. Levana attempts to brainwash Cinder into shooting herself but Cinder resists the attempt and fires a pistol at Levana. After a standoff where she ends up trying to escape, runs off, and trips on stairs causing her to lose her foot, Kai has no choice but to arrest Cinder in the New Beijing Prison and agree to hand Cinder over to Levana to save the Earth from war. Later, in Cinder's prison cell, Dr. Erland visits and reveals that Cinder is actually the lost Princess Selene. Erland gives Cinder a new hand with objects hidden in the fingers and a foot made of titanium, and convinces her to escape on her own in order to join him in Africa so that she began her training to overthrow Levana and take back her throne.

== Characters ==
- Linh Cinder, a 16-year-old cyborg mechanic. She is based on Cinderella.
- Iko, Cinder's android assistant. Iko sometimes forgets that she's not human due to her "malfunctioning" personality chip.
- Kaito, known commonly as Kai, the Crown Prince of Eastern Commonwealth. He is based on Prince Charming of Cinderella's history.
- Nainsi, Kai's android that was brought to Cinder at the beginning of the story.
- Rikan, Kai's father and emperor of New Beijing, who is dying of letumosis at the beginning of the novel.
- Linh Peony, Cinder's stepsister and friend; daughter of Linh Garan and Linh Adri. Early in the book, she contracts letumosis.
- Linh Pearl, daughter of Adri and Garan and the older sister of Peony. She regularly degrades and picks on Cinder, her stepsister.
- Linh Adri, Cinder's cruel stepmother and guardian who believes that cyborgs are inhuman mutants incapable of emotions. She regularly mistreats Cinder and blames her for all the hardships in her and her family's life.
- Chang Sacha, a baker in the marketplace who contracted letumosis at the beginning of the story and consequently had her booth burned down. She disliked Cinder intensely due to her being a cyborg.
- Chang Sunto, the son of Sacha
- Dr. Erland, the head of the letumosis research division at the palace. His given name is Dimitri.
- Levana, the queen of Luna. She has a powerful charming ability called glamour used to force people to do her bidding and to also give the impression that she looks beautiful.
- Sybil Mira, Levana's head thaumaturge, loyal to Levana and willing to do her bidding. Sybil was originally stationed in New Beijing Palace before Emperor Rikan died of letumosis.
- Konn Torin, Royal advisor and friend of Prince Kai

== Themes ==
The novel has been discussed by scholars as engaging with posthumanism themes, particularly in its portrayal of a cyborg protagonist that challenges distinctions between human and nonhuman identity. Scholars also state that it explores identity formation and gender roles, as the protagonist navigates conflicting social expectations and marginalization within her society.

== Reception ==
Critical reception to Cinder has been mostly positive, with the Los Angeles Times calling the book "refreshing" and praising the character of Cinder. Publishers Weekly also positively reviewed the book, saying that the characters are "easy to get invested in". Booklist called Cinder a "fresh spin on Cinderella". The Wall Street Journal wrote that the book was an "undemanding and surprisingly good-natured read". Kidz World stated that Cinder was "an amazing story about love that comes in mysterious packages".

Kirkus Reviews wrote that the telepathic-enslaver theme was "simplistic and incongruous-feeling" but said that Cinder "offers a high coolness factor". The Horn Book Magazine wrote that Cinder's reveal was predictable but that the book's "twists and turns, complex characters, and detailed world-building to redeem itself". Tor.com wrote that "while Cinder does have its flaws, it's a solidly entertaining story, and one of the best re-imaginings of Cinderella I've seen in ages." Reflecting on the novel's blend of fairy tale and steampunk motifs, literary scholar Terri Doughty concludes that Meyer "rewrites the meme of female passivity as Cinder works through a process of identity formation. Compared to the novel's female characters that use traditional markers of femininity to disguise their manipulations and cruelties, the cyborg mechanic Cinder emerges as a positive role model for girls."

Interviewed at the Bologna Children's Book Fair (Bologna, Italy) in 2012, the author revealed the origin of her novel. She is a "fairy tale geek", she has spent considerable time tracing the origins of the most common Western children's stories. According to Meyer, "some scholars believe that a story called "Ye Xian", which was first recorded in 9th-century China is the original Cinderella tale and the direct ancestor to the stories we know from Charles Perrault and the Brothers Grimm. Additionally, some believe that the iconic lost slipper used to find the runaway girl came to us from China's tradition of foot-binding and a culture in which women were praised for tiny feet." For this reason, Marissa Meyer decided to set her futuristic version in New Beijing, in order to "close the circle" and re-take the story to its original place. In addition to that, the decision to make Cinder a cyborg started from a hilarious thought: the idea came to her mind that, instead of losing a shoe, Cinderella might lose a whole foot on the stairs.

== Sequels and franchise ==
There are four books, a prequel novel, and a collection of novellas in The Lunar Chronicles. The second book in the series, Scarlet, is based on Little Red Riding Hood. The third book, Cress, is based on Rapunzel. Book 3.5, which was released in January 2015, is called Fairest, which acts as the fourth book and is a prequel focusing on the main antagonist, Queen Levana. The fifth one (officially book four) is called Winter and was released in November 2015. Both Winter and Fairest are loosely based on the story of Snow White. Marissa Meyer has also released three free short stories via the website Wattpad. These are entitled Glitches - set prior to Cinder, The Queen's Army - set just before Scarlet, and The Little Android which is based on Hans Christian Andersen's The Little Mermaid. Stars Above, a Lunar Chronicles collection was released in February 2016. This collection included nine stories, five of which have never been published and an excerpt of Meyer's stand alone novel, Heartless, which was released on November 8, 2016.

== Movie adaptation ==
Marissa Meyer has confirmed that there has been some interests in a movie adaptation of Cinder and she has signed a deal for the movie, although a studio is being kept a secret. The author said that the studio was searching for a director. In January 2022, Warner Bros. Pictures, Locksmith Animation and Warner Bros. Pictures Animation acquired the animated feature film rights to adapt The Lunar Chronicles.
