= Les conteuses =

Group of French women authors

Les conteuses were a group of French female authors active between 1690 and 1709 who wrote nearly two-thirds of the more than one hundred fairy tales published by French authors during this time. This group was composed of more than thirteen women, including Marie-Catherine d'Aulnoy, Marie-Jeanne L'Héritier, Catherine Bernard, Henriette-Julie de Murat, Charlotte-Rose de Caumont de La Force, and Catherine Durand. Although some speculation exists regarding their personal and professional relationships, these women maintained familiarity through their similar social statuses, frequent participation in French literary society, and interactions within their literature.

== History ==
Some speculation exists regarding les conteuses’ personal and professional relationships. The actual fairy tales written by the members of les conteuses are the most tangible sources of information regarding their lives. However, it is likely that these women were familiar, even simply by reputation. They maintained general familiarity through their social statuses, family ties, the French literary network, and intertextual references. For example, Marie-Jeanne L’hériter dedicated one of her tales to Henriette-Julie de Murat. Another example is that several members of les conteuses referenced their co-members’ characters within their tales. Some of the members also maintained close friendships, such as Henriette-Julie de Murat and Catherine Durand.

Despite their help in establishing the French fairy tale genre between 1690 and 1709, les conteuses are less widely known than other authors of the period. One of the most notable male authors of this time was Charles Perrault. He remains recognizable to modern audiences for his tales of Cinderella, Little Red Riding Hood, Mother Goose, and more. While male authors of this period had more flexibility in the creation and publishing of fairy tales, female authors were still provided a unique social scene.

Carolyn Lougee referred to seventeenth-century France as "Le Paradis des Femmes" - paradise for women. This was a period in France where fairy tales were not completely controlled by male authors, directly contrasting with other countries at the time. The new genre of fairy tales, as introduced by Marie-Catherine d'Aulonoy, allowed women to exercise more freedom than would be expected, and therefore grow in prominence. As Lewis C. Seifert put it, "Here was a (rare) literary movement dominated by women writers..."

In seventeenth- and eighteenth-century France, salons were social centers for discussion and new ideas. Primarily created and led by women in the seventeenth century, these hubs challenged social structures, especially courtly ideals and the concept of nobility. By the eighteenth century, these salons evolved to center around Enlightenment instead of nobility. Coupled with their female-led inheritance and the gathering of sexes within one discussion-focused space, French salons of the eighteenth century were prime spaces for artists such as les conteuses to participate and benefit from challenges to social norms, namely their ability to produce and publish their own work. This primed les conteuses to become what Elizabeth Harries refers to them as the “original” fairy-tale writers.

Although female authors benefitted from these social evolutions, Harries argues that their restriction to domestic settings such as the salon has had a strong impact on how les conteuses are remembered today. In her book Twice Upon a Time: Women Writers and the History of the Fairy Tale, she theorizes about the appropriation of fairy tales published by members of les conteuses by male authors of the period, and how the process has confused the history of the origin of fairy tales.

== Significant themes ==
Les conteuses portrayed love differently from the traditional techniques of other French fairy tales, depicting the emotion as complex, with multiple possible outcomes, not all of them happy. According to Lewis S. Seifert, in the words of Bronwyn Reddan, “...their tales question the idealization of love as the ultimate fairy tale happy ending even as they contribute to the establishment of the conventional marriage closure”.

Les conteuses incorporated economic and social messages within their fairy tales to communicate certain moral themes to their audience. For example, Marie-Jeanne L'héritier defines moral goals closely in "Les Enchantements de l'éloquence,", portraying characters with positive mentalities who prosper in life despite tragedy or financial fluctuations.

Les conteuses also challenged gender expectations by portraying female characters who cross-dressed or otherwise fluctuated from gender performance. For example, in Belle-Belle, ou le chevalier Fortuné by Marie-Catherine d'Aulnoy, the main character, along with her sisters, cross-dress as men in order to join the royal army. The tale ends positively for the main character, calling into question subjects such as power, gender, and responsibility. Other examples, such as Henriette-Julie de Murat's Le Sauvage, or Marie-Jeanne L'hériter's Marmoisan, further strengthen this trope of cross-dressing.

== Notable members ==
=== Marie-Catherine d'Aulnoy ===
Marie-Catherine d'Aulnoy published the first French-style fairy tale, "L'île de la Félicité," in her novel L'Histoire d'Hypolite, comte de Douglas. By doing this, scholars agree that she both introduced the fairy tale and initiated a publication technique that would become popular in France, in which multiple tales are combined within a larger narrative.

== Academic study ==
In 2025, author Jane Harrington wrote biographies of the seven conteuses' lives and retold thirteen of their fairy tales in her book titled Women of the Fairy Tale Resistance: The Forgotten Founding Mothers of the Fairy Tale and the Stories That They Spun.
