= List of Old Girls of Abbotsleigh =

This is a List of notable Old Girls of Abbotsleigh, they being notable former students or alumnae of the Anglican Church school, Abbotsleigh in Wahroonga, New South Wales, Australia. The alumnae may elect to join the school's alumni association, the Abbotsleigh Old Girls' Union (AOGU).

== Academic ==
- Freda Whitlam AM – lay preacher of the Uniting Church; Sister of former prime minister Gough Whitlam; former principal of the Presbyterian Ladies' College, Croydon

== Entertainment, media and the arts ==
- Edwina Bartholomew – Sunrise presenter
- Erica Packer – singer and model; ex-wife of James Packer
- Nell Campbell – actor; played Colombia in The Rocky Horror Picture Show
- Louise Cox AO – Australian architect
- Belinda Bauer – née Taubman; actor; appeared in 17 US films; played Dr. Juliette Faxx in RoboCop 2
- Linda Cropper – actress
- Kate Dennis – Emmy-nominated director and producer
- Kate Forsyth – author
- Alexandra Joel – author
- Janet Laurence – Australian artist
- Belinda Luscombe – journalist, editor at large at TIME Magazine
- Belinda Murrell – author
- Georgie Parker – actress
- Betty Rayner – created the Australian Children's Theatre in 1948
- Jennifer Rowe AC – children's book author under pen name Emily Rodda
- Amba Shepherd – Australian singer-songwriter
- Helen de Guerry Simpson – novelist
- Grace Cossington Smith AO, OBE – artist
- Cathy Wilcox – Australian cartoonist and children's book illustrator
- Linden Wilkinson – film, television and theatre actress, and writer

== Medicine and science ==
- Agnes Bennett OBE – pioneering medical practitioner and scientist
- Sally Crossing AM – consumer health advocate
- Cindy Pan – doctor, dancer, television personality
- Karen Simmer AO – current professor of Newborn Medicine at the University of Western Australia
- Mary Tindale – botanist and Australian Botanical Liaison Officer
- Dr Louise Holliday – Antarctic explorer, first Australian woman to be appointed to Davis Base

== Politics, public service and the law ==
- Meredith Burgmann – politician – Australian Labor Party; former President NSW Legislative Council
- Pauline Griffin AM – former Commissioner of the Australian Industrial Relations Commission, chair of the National Committee on Discrimination in Employment and Occupation and former Pro-Chancellor of the Australian National University
- Phyllis Mander-Jones MBE – librarian, archivist and historian

== Activism ==
- Penelope Figgis AO – Australian environmentalist, activist, and political scientist
- Beatrice Miles – Bohemian rebel and political activist

== Sport ==
- Denise Annetts – women's cricketer for New South Wales Breakers and Australia whose international playing career ran from 1985 until 1993.
- Phyllis Arnott – member of the Arnotts biscuit family, first Australian woman to gain a commercial pilot's licence
- Carly Boag – basketball player
- Hannah Campbell-Pegg – Australian Luge Winter Olympian
- Jill Coleburn – Australian biathlete
- Kiana Elliott – international weightlifter
- Sue Fear – First Australian woman to climb Mount Everest
- Margaret Peden – Cricketer; former captain of the Australian women's cricket team (1934)
- Astrid Radjenovic – Australian Bobsled Winter Olympian

== Business ==
- Susan Lloyd-Hurwitz – CEO of Mirvac
- Jill Ker Conway AC – author, academic and businesswoman, former chair of Lendlease, former director of Colgate-Palmolive, Merrill Lynch and Nike

== Notable staff ==
- Jacqueline Harvey, author
- Betty Archdale, Australian sportswoman and educator

== See also ==
- Association of Heads of Independent Girls' Schools
