= Henriette-Julie de Murat =

French writer

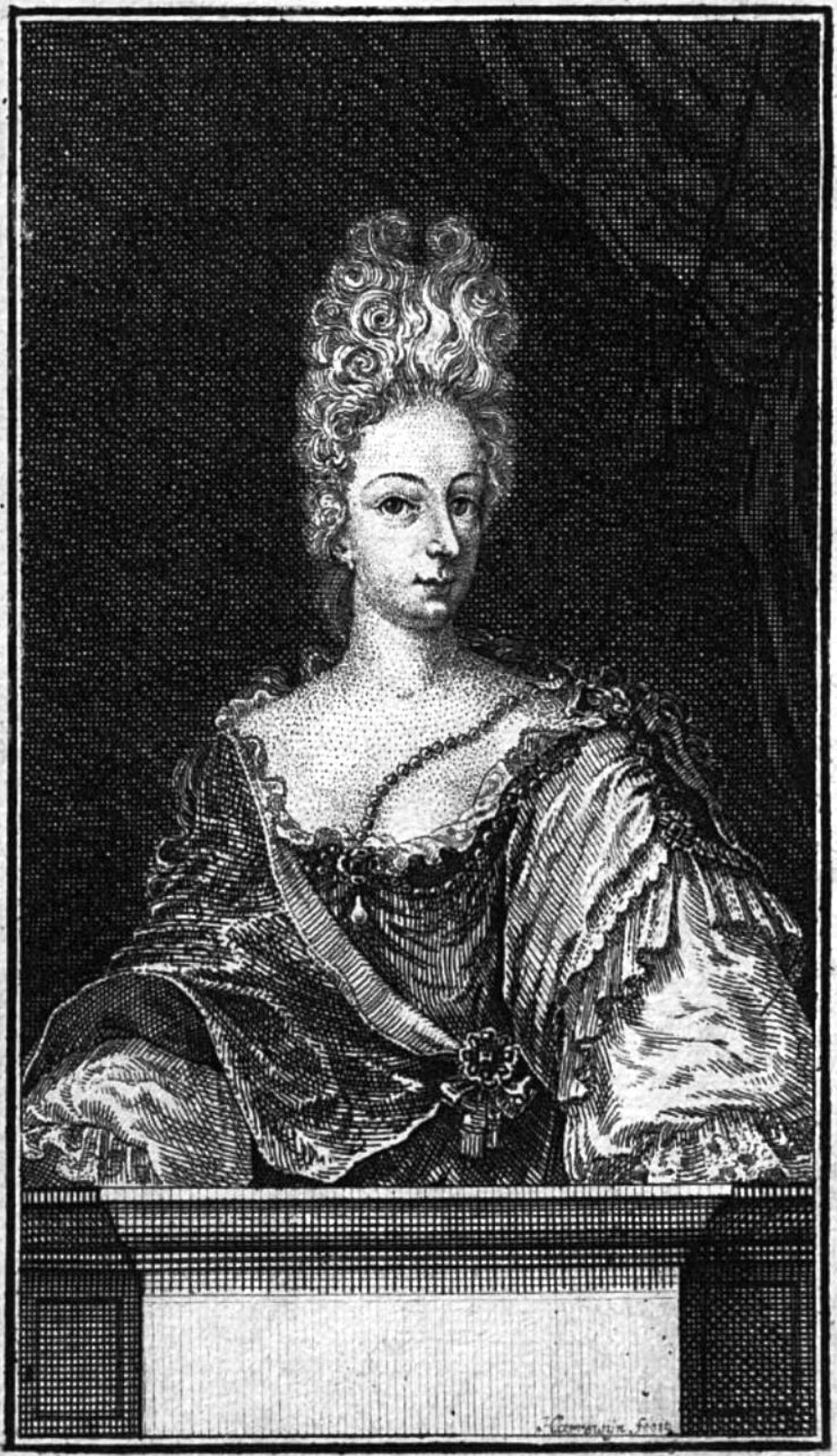
Engraved portrait, 1699

Henriette-Julie de Murat (French: [ɑ̃ʁjɛt ʒyli də myʁa]; 1668 in Paris – 9 September 1716 in Château de la Buzardière) was an aristocratic French writer of the late 17th century, associated with the Baroque Précieuses movement, and one of the leading members of the French Salons who created the fairy tale genre. She was considered to be part of les conteuses.

== Life ==
She most likely spent most of her childhood in Paris after having been born there on 14 October 1668 to Louise-Marie Foccault de Daugnon from Limousin, daughter of Louis Foucault, Count de Daugnon, and Michel de Castelnau from Bigorre, colonel and governor of Brest, and son of Jacques de Mauvissiere, Marquis de Castelnau. Her father died on 2 December 1672, when she was only four years old, from wounds incurred in the Franco-Dutch war. Salonnieres Charlotte-Rose de Caumont de La Force and Louise de Bossigny were both her cousins.

As the daughter of a marquis, she was officially presented at the court of Versailles in 1686. In 1691 she married Nicholas de Murat, Count de Gilbertez, colonel of an infantry regiment. He had previously been married to her cousin, Marie de la Tour, who had died 1688.

From 1692 she frequently attended the salon of Anne-Therese de Marguenat de Courcelles, the Marquise de Lambert at the Rue de Richelieu in the heart of Paris. There she socialized with Marie Catherine d'Aulnoy, Catherine Bernard, and Marie-Jeanne L'Héritier de Villandon, as well as her cousins Charlotte-Rose Caumont de la Force and Louise de Bossigny, and soon began to submit poems to academic and salon competitions.

In 1697 she published Memoirs of the Countess of M***, a two-volume collection of false "memoirs" which was meant as a response to Charles de Saint-Évremond's 1696 book Memoirs of the Life of Count D*** before his Retirement, which had portrayed women as incapable of virtue and fickle. Murat's book was successful and was even translated into English.

She was one of the leaders of the fairy tale vogue, along with Marie Catherine d'Aulnoy, Charlotte-Rose de Caumont La Force, Marie-Jeanne L'Héritier, and Charles Perrault. At Marie-Jeanne L'Héritier's insistence, she published three volumes of fairy tales between 1698 and 1699 - Fairy Tales (1698), New Fairy Tales (1698), and Sublime and Allegorical Stories (1699). Murat claimed that they were all drawing on Straparola’s classically-inspired stories (particularly ‘The Savage’, ‘The Pig King’, and ‘The Turbot’), but she was probably also inspired by French medieval legends and Breton folktales.

In 1699 she also published A Trip to the Country, which was particularly popular, going through multiple editions right up to the 1789 Revolution and extending the fairy tale genre into a contemporary setting with a cross over to the ghost story genre.

That same year Murat was elected to the Accademia degli Ricovrati (Academy of the Sheltered) of Padua, along with de La Force and Bernard, joining the salon hostesses d’Aulnoy, L’Heritier, Scudery and Antoinette Deshoulieres. Another recognition she received was one of the Academy of Toulouse's Floral Games prizes for excerpts from a volume of her poetry, which is now lost.

In December 1699 she was involved in a scandal when a report was circulated accusing her of "shocking practices and beliefs" including lesbianism. From 1698-1702 Murat was the subject of police reports on her activities by the Lieutenant General of the Paris Police, Marc Rene, Marquis de Voyer d'Argenson with his report of 6 December 1699 of her ‘shocking practices and beliefs’ bringing matters to crisis point.

‘The crimes that are attributed to Madame de Murat are not of a kind to be easily proven by way of information, because they deal with domestic impiety and a monstrous attachment to people of her own sex. However, I would very much like to know what she would say to the following facts; a portrait pierced several times with a knife, an act caused by her own jealousy towards a woman she loved and then left a few months ago only to become attached to Madame de Nantiat, another woman of the greatest dissoluteness, known less for the fines she incurred for her gambling than for her moral disorder. That woman, who is housed by [Murat] is the object of her perpetual adorations even in the presence of some valets and pawnbrokers.’

She was estranged from her husband and disinherited by her mother, which forced her to stop publishing. It appears she spent the next year in the Limousin region staying with Diane-Marie de Pontcharraud, who was a year or two older than Murat, and who had married the Baron de Nantiat when she was just fourteen.

She was exiled to the Château de Loches in 1702; in 1701 her debauchery was considered confirmed by the fact that she was pregnant. She tried to escape from the Château de Loches in 1706 wearing men's clothing. She was discovered soon after in a cave beneath a nearby church and resisted arrest by stabbing and biting the thumb of the police.

She was then transferred to the chateau prisons of Saumur, then Angers, then back to Loches, living as a peripheral member of provincial society, and labouring under diminishing health, before being brought back to the Château de Loches in 1707. Her friend Mme Parbere, the Countess d’Argenton, mistress of the Duc d’Orleans, negotiated her freedom in 1709 on condition that Murat remain with her aunt, Mademoiselle de Dampierre, in Limousin.

She wrote a 607-page journal, framed by a letter to her cousin Mademoiselle de Menou. Her last work was The Sprites of Kernosy Castle, published in 1710.

She was not allowed to return to Paris until the death of Louis XIV in 1715 but by that time she was so sick with arthritis and dropsy that she retired to her grandmother’s castle in Maine. She died in the family’s Chateau de Buzardiere on 26 September 1716 aged 46 or 48.

== Works ==
=== Fairy tales ===
- Fairy Tales (1697)
  - Le Parfait Amour (Perfect Love)
  - Anguillette
  - Jeune et Belle (Young and Handsome)
- New Fairy Tales (1698)
  - Le Palais de la vengeance (The Palace of Revenge)
  - Le Prince des feuilles (The Prince of Leaves)
  - Le Bonheur des moineaux (The Happiness of Sparrows), a verse tale
  - L'Heureuse Peine (The Fortunate Punishment)
- Le Voyage de campagne (1699)
  - Le Père et ses quatre fils (The Father and His Four Sons)
- Sublime and Allegorical Stories (1699)
  - Le Roi Porc (The Pig King)
  - L'Île de la magnificence (The Island of Magnificence)
  - Le Sauvage (The Savage)
  - Le Turbot (The Turbot)
- Journal pour Mademoiselle de Menou (1708)
  - L'Aigle au beau bec (The Eagle with the Handsome Beak)
  - La Fée princesse (The Princess Fairy)
  - Peine perdue
  - L'Origine du hérisson (The Origin of the Hedgehog)
  - An untitled unfinished tale

== Sources ==
- Stedman, Allison (2011). "Introduction". In Gethner, Perry (ed.). A Trip to the Country: by Henriette-Julie de Castelnau, Comtesse de Murat. Wayne State University Press. pp. 1–17. ISBN 978-0-8143-3681-6. Project MUSE chapter 368859.
- Gethner, Perry (2011). A Trip to the Country: by Henriette-Julie de Castelnau, Comtesse de Murat. Wayne State University Press. ISBN 978-0-8143-3681-6.
- Patard, Geneviève (2012). "Henriette-Julie de Castelnau, Countess de Murat: 1668?–1716". In Raynard, Sophie (ed.). The Teller's Tale: Lives of the Classic Fairy Tale Writers. SUNY Press. pp. 81–87. ISBN 978-1-4384-4355-3. Project MUSE chapter 662497.
