= Clementine Rose =

Children's literature series

- Author: Jacqueline Harvey
- Illustrator: J. Yi
- Cover artist: Leanne Beattie (cover design)
- Country: Australia
- Language: English
- Genre: Children's literature
- Publisher: Puffin - Penguin Random House Australia
- Published: 2012 through present
- No. of books: 15

Clementine Rose is a children's literature series about a young girl who is adopted into an unconventional family. The first book in the series, Clementine Rose and the Surprise Visitor, was published in 2012. Jacqueline Harvey, best-selling author of the Alice-Miranda children's book series, teacher and former Deputy Head of Abbotsleigh Junior School, is the series creator.

== Plot summary ==
Clementine Rose Appleby was delivered not in the usual way in a hospital, but in the back of a minivan, in a basket of dinner rolls. The stories of this little girl begin when she is adopted by Lady Clarissa Appleby and comes to live with her in the Penberthy House Hotel in the village of Penberthy Floss with their butler, Digby Pertwhistle, known as Uncle Digby. Clementine has a big heart and a penchant for reciting poems that Uncle Digby teaches her. She has an unusual pet, a tea cup piggy called Lavender.

== Books ==
1. Clementine Rose and the Surprise Visitor (2012)
2. Clementine Rose and the Pet Day Disaster (2013)
3. Clementine Rose and the Perfect Present (2013)
4. Clementine Rose and the Farm Fiasco (2013)
5. Clementine Rose and the Seaside Escape (2014)
6. Clementine Rose and the Treasure Box (2014)
7. Clementine Rose and the Famous Friend (2014)
8. Clementine Rose and the Ballet Break-In (2015)
9. Clementine Rose and the Movie Magic (2015)
10. Clementine Rose and the Birthday Emergency (2015)
11. Clementine Rose and the Special Promise (2016)
12. Clementine Rose and the Paris Puzzle (2016)
13. Clementine Rose and the Wedding Wobbles (2017)
14. Clementine Rose and the Bake Off Dilemma (2018)
15. Clementine Rose and the Best News Yet (2019)
- Clementine Rose Busy Day Book (2014) (activity book)

== Reception ==
The Australian Booksellers' Association listed Clementine Rose and the Surprise Visitor as one "Australia's 50 Favourite Kids’ Books" in 2014. In 2015, the Australian Book Industry Awards (ABIA) shortlisted Clementine Rose and the Seaside Escape.

== External list ==
Clementine Rose website
