= Riquet with the Tuft =

French literary fairy tale

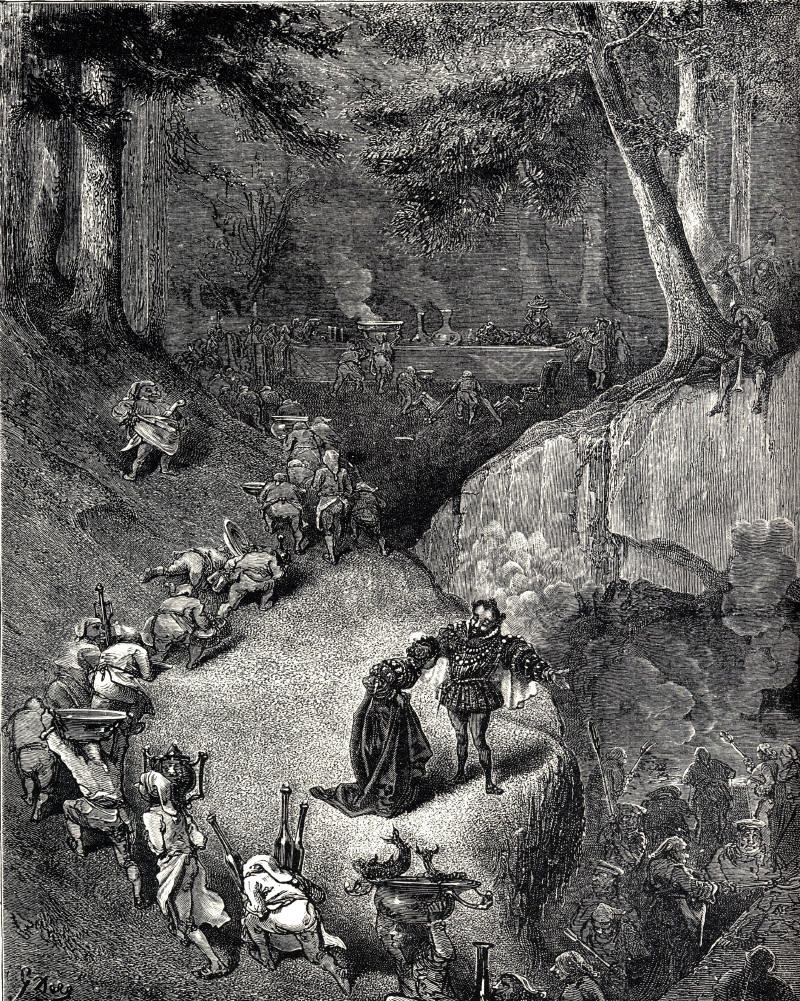
- 1867 illustration by Gustave Doré
- Author: Charles Perrault, Catherine Bernard
- Language: French
- Genre: Fairy Tale
- Publication date: 1696, 1697
- Publication place: France

"Riquet with the Tuft" (French: Riquet à la houppe), also known as "Ricky of the Tuft", is a French literary fairy tale first published by Catherine Bernard in 1696 in Ines de Cordoue. The more famous version is that of Charles Perrault in his Histoires ou contes du temps passé in 1697.

== Name ==
Three possible explanations of the name Riquet exist:

- Perrault mischievously refers to the Riquetti family, whose name was Frenchified as Riquet. Pierre-Paul Riquet, protege of Jean-Baptiste Colbert, was the promoter of the Royal Canal in Languedoc.
- Catherine Bernard, author of an earlier version which inspired Perrault, was from Normandy. Émile Littré, in his article “Riquet à la Houppe”, specifies: “Etymology: it is said that in Norman, riquet means counterfeit, hunchback”.
- This nickname can also be interpreted as the diminutive of Henriquet, little Henri.

== Plot ==
In the version by Charles Perrault, a fairy grants an ugly prince named Riquet (Ricky) the gift of intelligence and the ability to confer wit upon the one he loves the most. At birth, Prince Riquet has a small patch of hair on his head, leading to his nickname “of the tuft”.

Several years after Prince Riquet’s birth, a queen in a neighbouring kingdom gives birth to twin daughters. The first princess is considered “more beautiful than the dawn”, but the same fairy who attended Prince Riquet's birth warns the queen that her daughter would be as stupid as she is beautiful. The second princess is born ugly, but the fairy promises that the second daughter would have such great intelligence that her lack of beauty would hardly be noticed. Similarly to Prince Riquet, the fairy grants the first princess the ability to confer beauty upon any person. As the princesses grow, so do their virtues and weaknesses. The elder, beautiful princess is constantly overshadowed by her ugly, but very intelligent, sister and this causes her sorrow.

One day as the elder princess is going for a walk in the forest to ease her sorrow, she is approached by Prince Riquet who has travelled to her kingdom to meet her having fallen in love with portraits of her that circulate widely. Prince Riquet asks how a person so beautiful can be so sad, to which she responds that she is sad because she lacks intelligence and would willingly relinquish her beauty if she could be wiser. Prince Riquet then bestows the gift of intelligence on the elder princess for a promise of marriage in one year. As the princess’s intelligence grows so do her proposals of marriage, however, she is unable to make up her mind since she now finds the suitors too unintelligent. While thinking upon her options for marriage, she encounters Prince Riquet in the same forest where they met one year ago, as he has come to marry her. She refuses on grounds that he cannot hold her to a promise made before she gained her wisdom. Prince Riquet questions if there are any qualities that displease her besides his appearance, and the princess states that there are not. Prince Riquet then tells her that she was gifted at birth with the power to transform her lover into a beautiful person by the same fairy who helped him. The princess thinks of all Prince Riquet's good qualities, and he is transformed. The king has his daughter married to Prince Riquet who has already prepared for the wedding. The narrator of the story considers whether a fairy truly improved the appearance of Prince Riquet or whether the princess’s love for him made him appear handsome to her in spite of his physical flaws.

== Differences between the Perrault and Bernard Versions ==
The basic structure of a beautiful, but stupid, princess and an intelligent, but ugly, prince remains largely the same between the two versions of the story, however, there are some key differences. In the Bernard version of the tale, the princess is given the name “Mama”, her younger sister is not a character, and Prince Riquet is given no backstory beyond living in a subterranean kingdom.

The ultimate fate of the princess differs greatly between authors. In the Perrault version, the princess bestows her gift of beauty onto Prince Riquet and the two are happily married. In the Bernard version, which is a more pessimistic story, the princess is resigned to her marriage to Prince Riquet. During the one-year absence of Prince Riquet, the princess has formed a relationship with a suitor named Arada, but she chooses to marry Prince Riquet out of fear that he will rescind his gift of intelligence, and she will once again be socially isolated. The princess temporarily outsmarts Prince Riquet by inviting Arada to her new court, but they are caught in an affair. As a punishment, Prince Riquet transforms Arada into a gnome-like creature like himself and the princess is unable to tell the two apart, preventing the princess from having a meaningful relationship with Arada.

== Analysis ==
As a literary fairytale, the story was composed to be read to an audience in a salon and does not have a direct folkloric counterpart.

The story’s emphasis on the importance of intelligence, rather than just beauty, for a young woman is reflective of the ideals of seventeenth century upper-class society in France. During this period, the ideal upper-class person was considered an “honnêteté”, being loosely translated as a person possessing moral character, strong conversational skills, a broad knowledge of classical literature, and a rational mind.

As the ending of each version of the story are very different, the lessons that each author wishes to impart to the audience differs. Perrault’s version of the story imparts the moral that falling in love transforms the perception of the beloved, as the act of mutual gift giving creates a loving bond between the princess and Prince Riquet. In contrast, Bernard’s version provides the moral that marriage negatively affected women during seventeenth century France, and the story ends with the message that “‘in the long run, all lovers become husbands”.
