= Petrosinella =

Fairy tale by Giambattista Basile (1634)

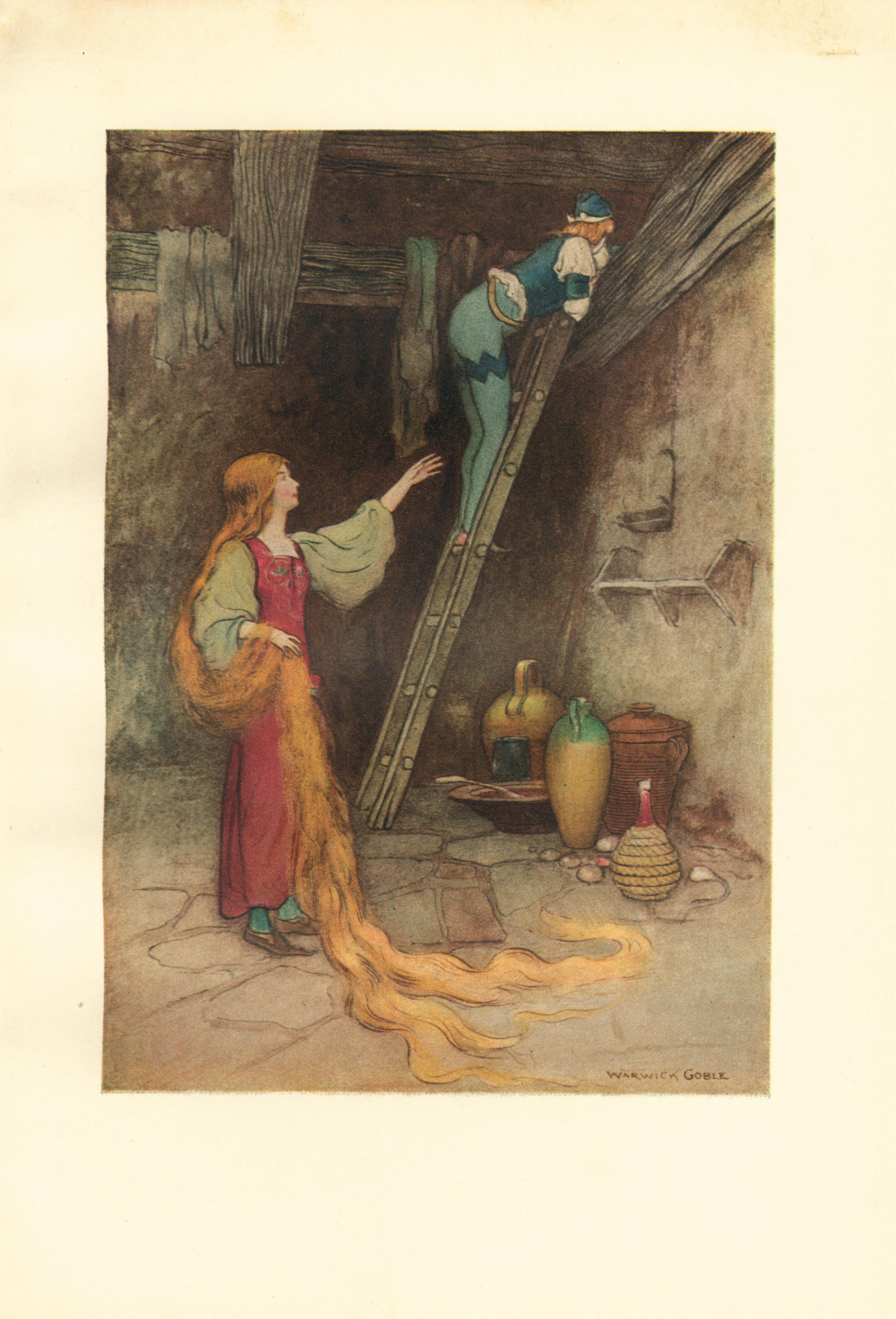
- Petrosinella and the prince ransack the rafters after the acorns. Illustration of "Petrosinella", by Warwick Goble.

Folk tale
- Name: Petrosinella
- Aarne–Thompson grouping: ATU 310, The Maiden in the Tower
- Country: Italy
- Region: Naples
- Origin Date: 1634–1636
- Published in: Pentamerone
- Related: Rapunzel

"Petrosinella" is a Neapolitan fairy tale, written by Giambattista Basile in his collection of fairy tales in 1634, Lo cunto de li cunti (The Tale of Tales), or Pentamerone, as the first story of the second day.

It is Aarne–Thompson type 310 "the Maiden in the Tower", of which the best known variant is "Rapunzel", and it is the earliest recorded variant of this tale known to exist.

== Plot ==
A pregnant woman steals parsley from the garden of an ogress (orca) and agrees to give up her child when she is caught. The baby is born and named Petrosinella, after the upper-southern Italian word for parsley (petrosino or petrusino; the modern standard Italian term is prezzemolo). The ogress watches the girl grow in her mother's care and reminds her often of her mother's promise. Petrosinella, unaware what the promise is, tells her mother of the ogress's comment. Petrosinella's irritated mother tells the girl to say to the ogress that she can act on the promise.

The ogress takes Petrosinella by her hair and locks her in a tower deep in the woods with only a single window; the ogress relies on Petrosinella's extremely long hair to enter the tower. Within the tower, Petrosinella is taught "magic arts" by the ogress. One day, a prince sees her hair in the wind. Petrosinella, noticing his passionate declarations of love, blows him a kiss. Eventually, the prince makes his way to the tower and climbs up Petrosinella's hair after he imitates the ogress's voice. The couple continues to see each other every night until a neighbor tells the ogress of the romance.

Petrosinella overhears that her secret has been revealed and plans to escape with the prince to the city. Stealing three magic gallnuts or acorns before climbing out of the tower with a rope ladder, Petrosinella uses the gallnuts as a distraction by throwing them behind her as the ogress chases the couple. The first bean turns into a dog that the ogress feeds a loaf of bread. The second becomes a lion that the ogress feeds a donkey from a nearby field, and she takes the donkey's skin as a coat. The third acorn turns into a wolf that swallows the ogress whole, as she is wearing the donkey skin.

With the ogress defeated and the couple free, Petrosinella and the prince get married with the permission of his father.

== Analysis ==
=== Tale type ===
Nancy Canepa classified the tale, according to the international Aarne-Thompson-Uther Index, as type 310, "The Maiden in the Tower", and type 313, "The Magic Flight" (previously, "Girl Helps the Hero Flee"). American folklorist D. L. Ashliman classified the tale as type 310, "Rapunzel, The Maiden in the Tower".

==== ATU 310, The Maiden in the Tower ====
In tale type ATU 310, "The Maiden in the Tower", parents steal a herb from a ogress's or witch's orchard, and they have to promise her their unborn child; the witch/ogress kidnaps or takes the girl after she is born and locks her up a tower, where she is raised; the girl grows up and has long hair she uses to rope the witch in and out of the tower in her visits. One day, a prince listens to the witch/ogress's command to the long-haired girl, imitates it and meets the girl, starting an affair with her. Later, the lovers flee the tower and the witch, after discovering their trysts, goes after them. Other fairy tales of this type include The Canary Prince, Persinette, Prunella, and Rapunzel.

==== ATU 313, The Magic Flight ====
The ogress's chase, in fact, is another folktale type, Aarne-Thompson type 313, The Girl Helps the Hero Flee; others of this type include The Water Nixie, Foundling-Bird, Nix Nought Nothing, and The Master Maid. In these tales, the girl is the daughter of the evil from which the hero flees, and some folklorists have interpreted it to mean that in the Rapunzel tale, the heroine's being the adopted daughter of the ogress or witch is an adaption of an original where she is the daughter.

Swiss folktale scholar Max Lüthi also concluded that the episode of the magical flight, typical of tale type ATU 313, "The Magical Flight" ("Girl Helps the Hero Flee"; "The Devil's Daughter"), is indeed a component of tale type ATU 310, "The Maiden in the Tower", although it is absent in Rapunzel. In the same vein, scholar Ton Deker remarked that "in oral versions" the heroine and the prince escape from the tower through the "Magic Flight" sequence.

Organizers of the Greek Folktale Catalogue, scholars Anna Angelopoulou and Aigle Broskou remarked that in Greek, Yugoslavian and Corsican variants the heroine is the witch's daughter. To professor Michael Merakles, this trait does appear in type 313, "The Magic Flight".

In addition, the establishers of the Spanish Folktale Catalogue, scholars Julio Camarena and Maxime Chevalier, created a new subtype in the Spanish Catalogue: type 310B, "La doncella en la torre escapa mediante fuga mágica" (English: "The Maiden in the Tower escapes by Magic Flight"), a combination of "Maiden in the Tower" with the closing episode of the Magic Flight. In this regard, scholars Josep A. Grimalt and Jaume Guiscafrè argue that this combination could represent either a Romance or Mediterranean subtype.

== Differences with "Rapunzel" ==
"Petrosinella" has many differences from both the 1812 and 1857 versions of "Rapunzel" recorded by the Grimm brothers. Notably, the Grimms' version does not mention the maiden's learning "magic arts", nor does it include an escape scene where she uses these powers to save both her and the prince from a pursuing villain. In the Grimms' version, it is the husband of a pregnant woman who steals the plant. The maiden goes to the villain immediately at birth, and the villain cuts her hair to trick the prince into the tower leading to his blinding. Furthermore, Basile does not include the maiden's out of wedlock pregnancy nor the birth of twins, which former is only mentioned explicitly in the 1812 iteration.

These differences can be accounted for by the Grimms' using translations of a French variation of the tale, "Persinette", by Charlotte-Rose de Caumont de La Force. There is no evidence of a Germanic oral version of the story, despite the Grimm brothers' believing they were recording a German fairy tale.

== See also ==
- Prunella (fairy tale)
