= Anne-Thérèse de Marguenat de Courcelles =

French writer and salonnière (1647–1733)

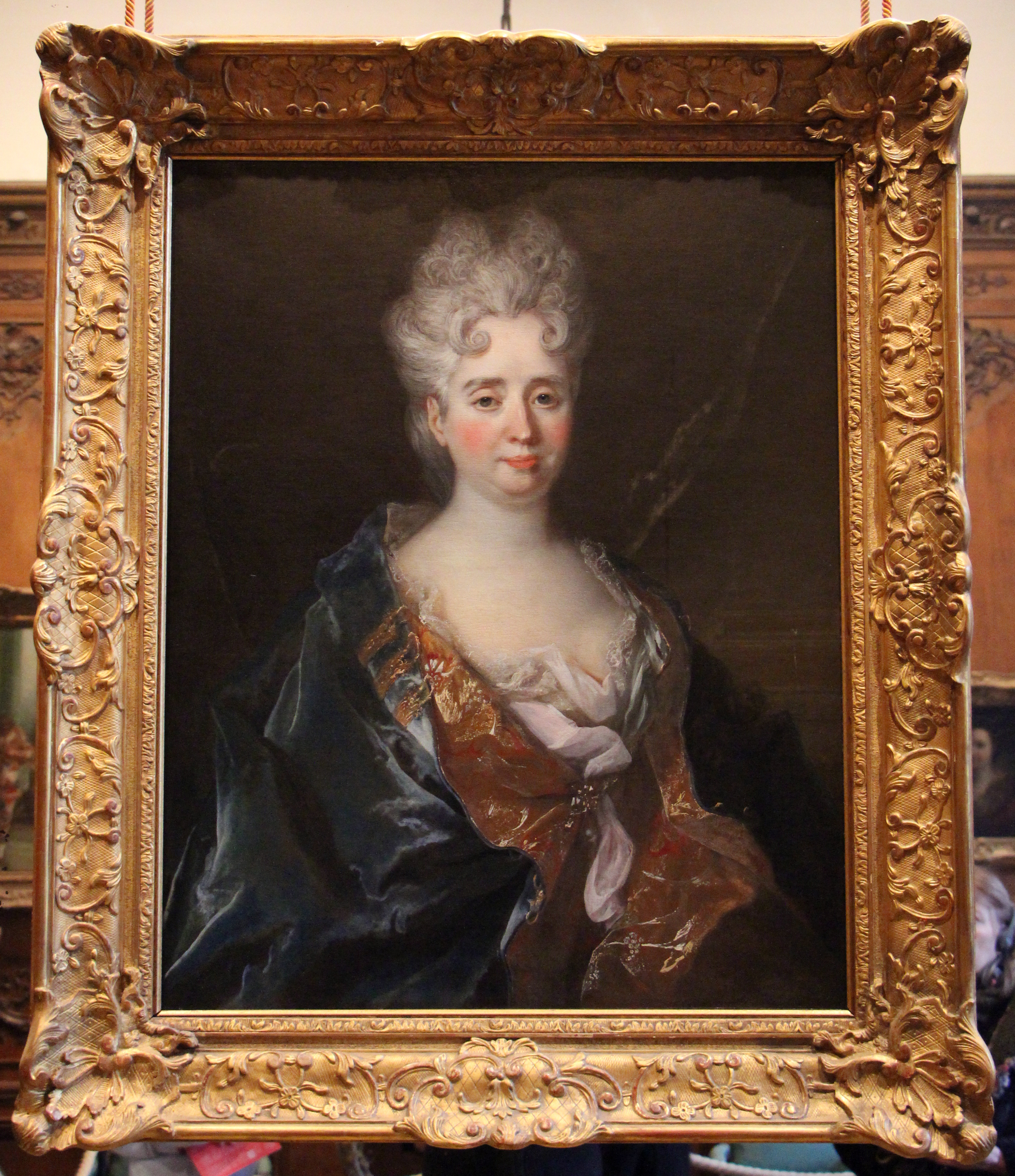
Portrait by Nicolas de Largillière

Anne-Thérèse de Marguenat de Courcelles (1647 – 12 July 1733), who on her marriage became Madame de Lambert, Marquise de Saint-Bris, and is generally known as the Marquise de Lambert, was a French writer and salonnière.

During the Régence, when the court of the Duchesse du Maine at the Château de Sceaux, and the Duc d’Orléans at the Palais-Royal were known for their lively social life, the salon of the Marquise de Lambert became associated with propriety and literary culture. Admission to her well-known "Tuesdays" was considered prestigious among the educated circles of the period.

== Biography ==
The only daughter of Étienne de Marguenat, Seigneur de Courcelles, and his wife, Monique Passart, Anne-Thérèse de Marguenat de Courcelles was born and died in Paris. She lost her father, an officer of the fiscal court of Paris, in 1650, when she was just three years old. She was raised by her mother, who was distinguished by the lightness of her habits, and by her mother's second husband, the literary dilettante François Le Coigneux de Bachaumont, who instilled in her a love of literature. At a young age, writes her friend Bernard Le Bouyer de Fontenelle, "she often stole away from the pleasures of youth to read alone, and she began, of her own accord, to write extracts of what struck her the most. It was either subtle reflections on the human heart, or ingenious turns of phrase, but most often reflections."

On 22 February 1666, she married Henri de Lambert, marquis de Saint-Bris, a distinguished officer who was to become a lieutenant-general and the governor of Luxembourg. Their union was very happy and they had two children: a son, Henri-François (1677–1754), and a daughter, Marie-Thérèse (1679-1731), who became Comtesse de Saint-Aulaire by her marriage. The Marquise de Lambert was widowed in 1686 and raised her two young children while carrying on lengthy and troublesome lawsuits against her husband's family to save her children's property.

In 1698, she rented the north-west half of the hôtel de Nevers, located on the rue de Richelieu near the current site of the Bibliothèque nationale. Starting in 1710, in her beautiful drawing room decorated by Robert de Cotte, she launched her famous literary salon. According to her friend the Abbé de La Rivière, "She fell victim to a colic of cultivation and wit, an illness which stuck her suddenly and which remained incurable until her death." She received visitors twice a week: literary people on Tuesdays and high society on Wednesdays, without, however, seeking to establish an impenetrable barrier between the two worlds; on the contrary, she liked to interest the well-born in literature and to introduce writers to the advantages of frequenting society, and regular visitors could pass without constraint from one day to the other.

The Tuesdays began about one o’clock in the afternoon. After a very fine dinner, "academic conferences" on a philosophical or literary theme took place. Political and religious discussions were absolutely prohibited. Every guest was required to give a personal opinion or to read some excerpts from their latest work; on the morning of the gathering, says the Abbé de La Rivière, "the guests prepared wit for the afternoon." The lady of the house directed what her critics called "wit’s business office". She encouraged writers to the highest moral tone and contributed to orienting the movement of ideas toward new literary forms: from her salon originated Antoine Houdar de la Motte's attacks on the three unities, on versification, and on Homer, whom Madame de Lambert thought dull; which did not prevent her from receiving such partisans of the Classical writers as Anne Dacier, Father d’Olivet, or Valincour.

The Marquise de Lambert was not socially conservative. She championed Montesquieu's satirical Persian Letters and succeeded in obtaining the author's election to the Académie française. She was one of the first society women to open her door to actors such as Adrienne Lecouvreur or Michel Baron.

Fontenelle and Houdar de la Motte attended her salon, as well as Marie-Catherine d’Aulnoy, the poet Catherine Bernard, the Abbé de Bragelonne, Father Buffier, the Abbé de Choisy, Madame Dacier, the mathematician Dortous de Mairan, Fénelon, Hénault, Marivaux, the Abbé Mongault, Montesquieu, the lawyer Louis de Sacy (one of the Marquise's favorites), the Marquis de Sainte-Aulaire, Baronne Staal, Madame de Tencin (who received the Marquise's guests at her death in 1733), and the Abbé Terrasson.

The Marquise de Lambert's salon was known as the antechamber of the Académie française. According to the Marquis d’Argenson, "she had brought about the election of half the members of the Academy."

Madame de Lambert, says Fontenelle, "was not only ardent to serve her friends, without waiting for their request, nor the humiliating exposition of their need; but a good deed to be done, even for someone she had no connection with, always interested her intensely, and the circumstances had to be especially contrary, for her not to succumb. Some bad outcomes of her generosity had not reformed her, and she always remained equally ready to risk doing good."

== Works ==
=== Literary legacy ===
Madame de Lambert was particularly interested in questions of education. She wrote Advice from a mother to her son (1726) and Advice from a mother to her daughter (1728) which are full of nobility and a great elevation of thought, and whose debt to the maxims of Fénelon she recognized: "I found the precepts which I gave to my son in Telemachus and the counsels to my daughter in L'Éducation des filles."

Her "Reflections on Women" were not intended to be printed, and when they were published from copies intended for friends of the author, she was greatly upset and believed herself dishonored. She bought up a large part of the edition to destroy it, which did not prevent several clandestine reprintings and even a translation into English. This text finely evokes the paradoxes of the feminine condition:

I have examined whether women could be better employed : I have found respectable authors who have thought that they had qualities which might carry them to great things, such as imagination, feeling, taste : gifts which they have received from Nature. I have reflected on each of these qualities. Since feeling dominates them, and leads them naturally towards love, I have sought whether they could be saved from the disadvantages of that passion, by separating pleasure from what is called vice. I have therefore imagined a metaphysics of love : let her practise it who can.

Without rejecting the attractions of femininity, the author revolts against the emptiness of women's education, reproaching Molière with '"having attached to learning the shame which was the lot of vice." It is inner emptiness, she believes, which leads to moral corruption : enhanced education is therefore a bulwark against vice.

She also wrote essays on Friendship and on Old Age, as well as depictions of the guests at her salon and pieces to be read at these gatherings.

She had a true talent for crafting maxims with a new and original turn : "It is often well thought," writes the nineteenth-century critic Charles Augustin Sainte-Beuve, "but it is even better said." Sometimes erring by an excess of refinement, she often shows energy and concision. Her writings are remarkable, according to Fontenelle, "for the tone of amiable virtue that reigns throughout," and, according to Louis Simon Auger, "for the purity of the style and the morality, the elevation of the sentiments, the fineness of the observations and the ideas."

The Marquise de Lambert was not very devout, even if she condemned irreligion as in bad taste; "Mme de Lambert’s religion," notes Sainte-Beuve, "is more of an elevated intellectual form than an interior and habitual spring flowing from the heart, or than a positive revelation." In this way, she was a forerunner of the Enlightenment and its philosophical ideas.

=== Chronological list ===
- Lettre de madame la Marquise de ***, sur les Fables Nouvelles [d’Antoine Houdar de La Motte]. Avec la réponse servant d’apologie, 1719
- Avis d’une mère à son fils [A Mother's Advice to Her Son], 1726
- Réflexions nouvelles sur les femmes, ou Métaphysique d’amour [New Reflections on Women, or Metaphysics of Love], 1727
- Avis d’une mère à sa fille [A Mother's Advice to Her Daughter], 1728
- Traité de l’Amitié [Essay on Friendship], 1732
- Traité de la Vieillesse [Essay on Old Age], 1732

The Marquise de Lambert's Works were published a number of times, beginning in 1747; besides the pieces listed above, they contained Dialogue entre Alexandre et Demosthène sur l’égalité des biens [Dialogue between Alexander and Demosthenes on the Equality of Happiness]; Psyché, en grec Âme [Psyche, Soul in Greek]; La Femme ermite, nouvelle [The Female Hermit]; letters, portraits, and discourses.

=== Translations ===
- Advice from a Mother to Her Son and Daughter; trans. William Hatchett. London: Tho. Worrall, 1729.
- The Philosophy of Love, or New Reflections on the Fair Sex; trans. John Lockman. London: J. Hawkins, 1729 and 1737.
- The Marchioness de Lambert's Letters to her Son and Daughter, On True Education and Dialogue Between Alexander and Diogenes on the Equality of Happiness; trans. Rowell. London: M. Cooper, 1749.
- The Works of the Marchioness de Lambert; trans. anon. London: W. Owen, 1749. Further editions in 1756, 1769, 1770 (Dublin: J. Potts), 1781.
- Essays on Friendship and Old Age; trans. Eliza Ball Hayley. London : J. Dodsley, 1780. American Libraries archive
- The Fair Solitary, or Female Hermit; trans. anon. Philadelphia: William Spottswood, 1790.
- "Advice of a Mother to Her Daughter"; trans. anon. In The Young Lady's Parental Monitor. London: Nathaniel Patten, 1792. American Libraries archive. And in Angelica's Ladies Library, or, Parents and Guardians Present. London: J. Hamilton, 1794. Google Books Republished, with a new introduction by Vivien Jones, Thoemmes Press, 1995.
- "Advice of a Mother to Her Son"; trans. anon. In Practical Morality, or, a Guide to Men and Manners. Hartford: William Andrus, 1841. Google Books
- New Reflections on Women: A New Translation and Introduction; trans. Ellen McNiven Hine. New York: Peter Lang Publishing, 1995.
