= Persinette =

French fairy tale written by Charlotte-Rose de Caumont de La Force

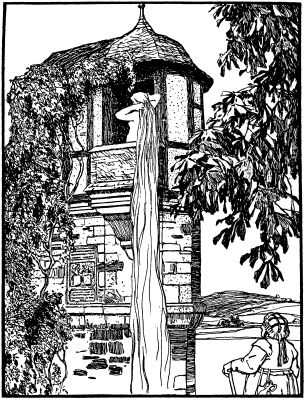
- Illustration of Rapunzel, a tale similar to Persinette

Folk tale
- Name: Persinette
- Aarne–Thompson grouping: 310
- Country: France
- Origin Date: 1698
- Related: Rapunzel Petrosinella

"Persinette" is a French literary fairy tale, written by Charlotte-Rose de Caumont de La Force, published in the 1698 book Les Contes des Contes. It is Aarne–Thompson type 310, The Maiden in the Tower, and a significant influence on the German fairy tale of "Rapunzel".

== Plot ==
A happily married couple await the birth of their first child. They live next door to a fairy whose walled garden is filled with fruits, plants, and vegetables, including parsley, which is notably rare. The wife desperately craves parsley, so her husband slips into the garden while the gate is open to get some for her. The second time he does so, the fairy catches him. He begs forgiveness and explains his story. The fairy responds by offering him as much parsley as he likes if he will give the child to her.

The fairy attends the birth and names the child Persinette, "Little Parsley". She bestows the child with great beauty and takes her home to raise her. However, the fairy worries about her fate, and when Persinette is twelve years old, the fairy moves her into a silver tower in the middle of the forest. Persinette lives in great wealth surrounded by fine clothes and food. When the fairy comes to visit, she tells Persinette to lower her golden, thirty-eight-yard-long hair so that she can climb it.

One day, a prince out hunting hears Persinette singing. Persinette is frightened by the sight of him. The prince seeks more information on the girl in the tower, and one day overhears the fairy telling Persinette to lower her hair. That night he imitates the fairy's voice to climb Persinette's hair to the tower. He immediately woos her and proposes marriage, and they begin meeting every night. Persinette soon becomes pregnant.

Noticing Persinette's pregnancy, the fairy makes her confess the truth. She cuts off Persinette's braids and long hair and carries her in a cloud to a hut on the seashore, where she leaves her. The hut is equipped with food that magically replenishes itself. There Persinette gives birth to twins, a boy, and a girl.

Meanwhile, the fairy lures the prince to the tower by mimicking Persinette's song and lowering the girl's hair as a rope. The prince reaches the top of the tower only for the fairy to confront him. When she tells him Persinette is no longer his, he flings himself from the tower. He does not die but is blinded. He spends years wandering the wilderness, seeking Persinette, until one day he hears her singing. He has entered the woods where she now lives with their children. When her tears of joy fall on his eyes, he regains his sight.

The family reunites but soon finds that the magically provided food now turns to stone when they try to eat, and their water turns into the crystal. Herbs turn into toads and venomous creatures, and birds become dragons and harpies. Persinette and the prince prepare to die embracing their family. However, the fairy is touched by their devotion and arrives in a golden chariot. She takes them to the palace of the prince's father, where they are welcomed home.

== Analysis ==
Persinette resembles the earlier Italian tale of Petrosinella (1634) as well as Madame d'Aulnoy's "La Chatte Blanche" (1697).

Friedrich Schulz published a German translation of the story, retitled Rapunzel, in 1790 in Kleine Romane (Little Novels). The Brothers Grimm would later publish their own version of this tale, believing that they were preserving a traditional German tale and removing added French elements. The Grimms replaced the fairy with a witch and shortened the ending.

== See also ==
- Petrosinella
- Rapunzel
- Puddocky
- The White Cat
