= Château de Loches =

Castle in the Loire Valley in France

- Loches, Indre-et-Loire, France
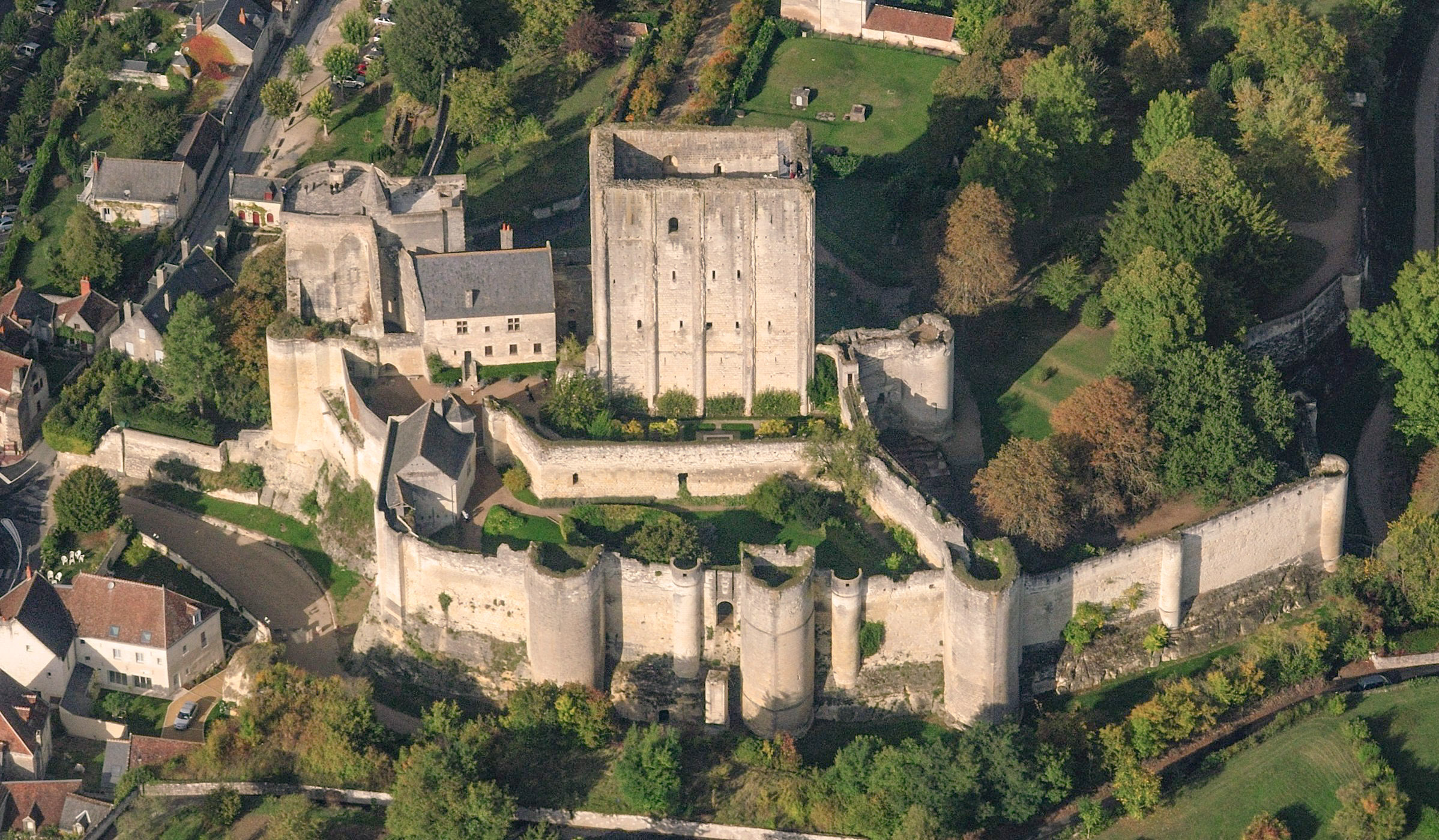
- Aerial view of the château

Site information
- Type: Castle
- Owner: Commune of Loches
- Open to the public: Yes
- Condition: Ruins

Location
- Shown within France
- Coordinates: 47.124722°N 0.996667°E

Site history
- Materials: Stone

The Château de Loches (also called Le Logis Royal de Loches) is a castle located in the département of Indre-et-Loire in the Loire Valley in France; it was constructed in the 9th century. Built some 500 metres (1,600 ft) away from the river Indre, the huge castle, famous mostly for its massive square keep, dominates the town of Loches. The castle was captured from the English by King Philip II of France in 1204.

== History ==
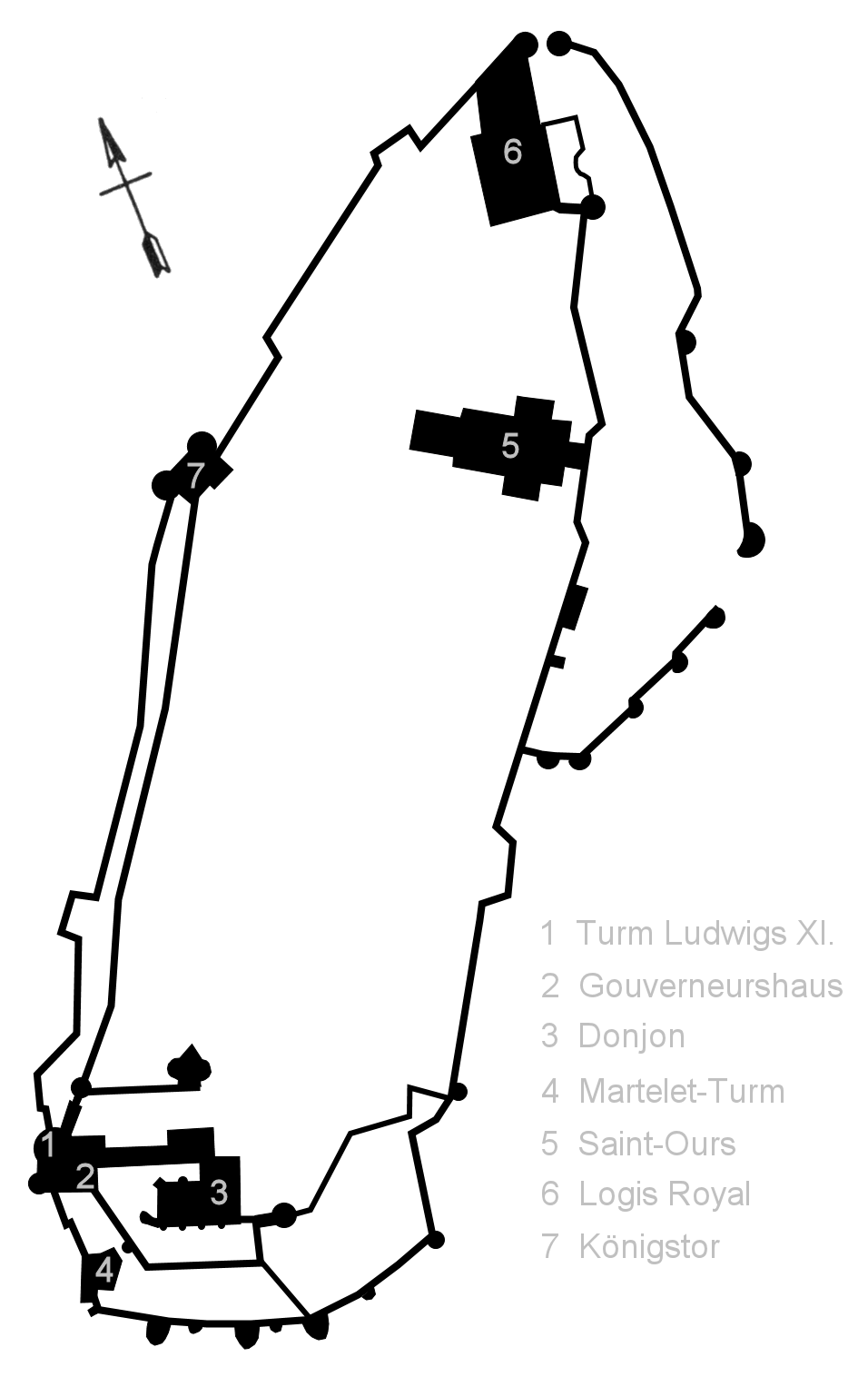
Floor plan of the Château

The castle was occupied by Henry II of England and his son, Richard the Lionheart during the 12th century, it withstood the assaults by the French King Philip II in their wars for control of France until it was finally captured by Philip in 1204. Construction work immediately upgraded Loches into a huge military fortress.

The castle would become a favourite residence of Charles VII of France, who gave it to his mistress, Agnès Sorel, as her residence. Agnès Sorel was the first woman to be officially recognized as a « Favorite ». It would be converted for use as a State prison by his son, King Louis XI who had lived there as a child but preferred the Château d'Amboise.

In December 1699 Henriette-Julie de Murat was involved in a scandal when a report was circulated accusing her of "shocking practices and beliefs" including lesbianism. She was estranged from her husband and disinherited by her mother, forced to take a hiatus from publishing, and eventually exiled to the Château de Loches in 1702; in 1701 her debauchery was considered confirmed by the fact that she was pregnant. She tried to escape from the Château de Loches in 1706 wearing men's clothing. She was then transferred to two other prisons before being brought back to the Château de Loches in 1707. In 1709 she obtained partial liberty from the Countess d'Argenton on the condition that she return to her aunt's home.

During the American Revolution, France financed and fought with the Americans against Great Britain and King Louis XVI used the castle of Loches as a prison for captured British prisoners.

At the time of the French Revolution, the château was ransacked and severely damaged. Some major restoration began in 1806 but today there are parts visible as ruins only. Owned by the Commune of Loches, the castle and the adjacent ancient Church of Saint-Ours are open to the public.

The Château de Loches has been recognised as a monument historique since 1861 and is listed by the French Ministry of Culture.

== Layout ==
The 11th-century keep – built by Fulk III, Count of Anjou – measures 23.3 by 15.4 metres (76 by 51 ft) with walls 2.8 m (9 ft 2 in) thick. Its four storeys stand 37 m (121 ft) high. Each floor was a single room. As was typical of most keeps, the ground floor was mostly likely used for storage.

== See also ==
- List of castles in France
- Tuffeau
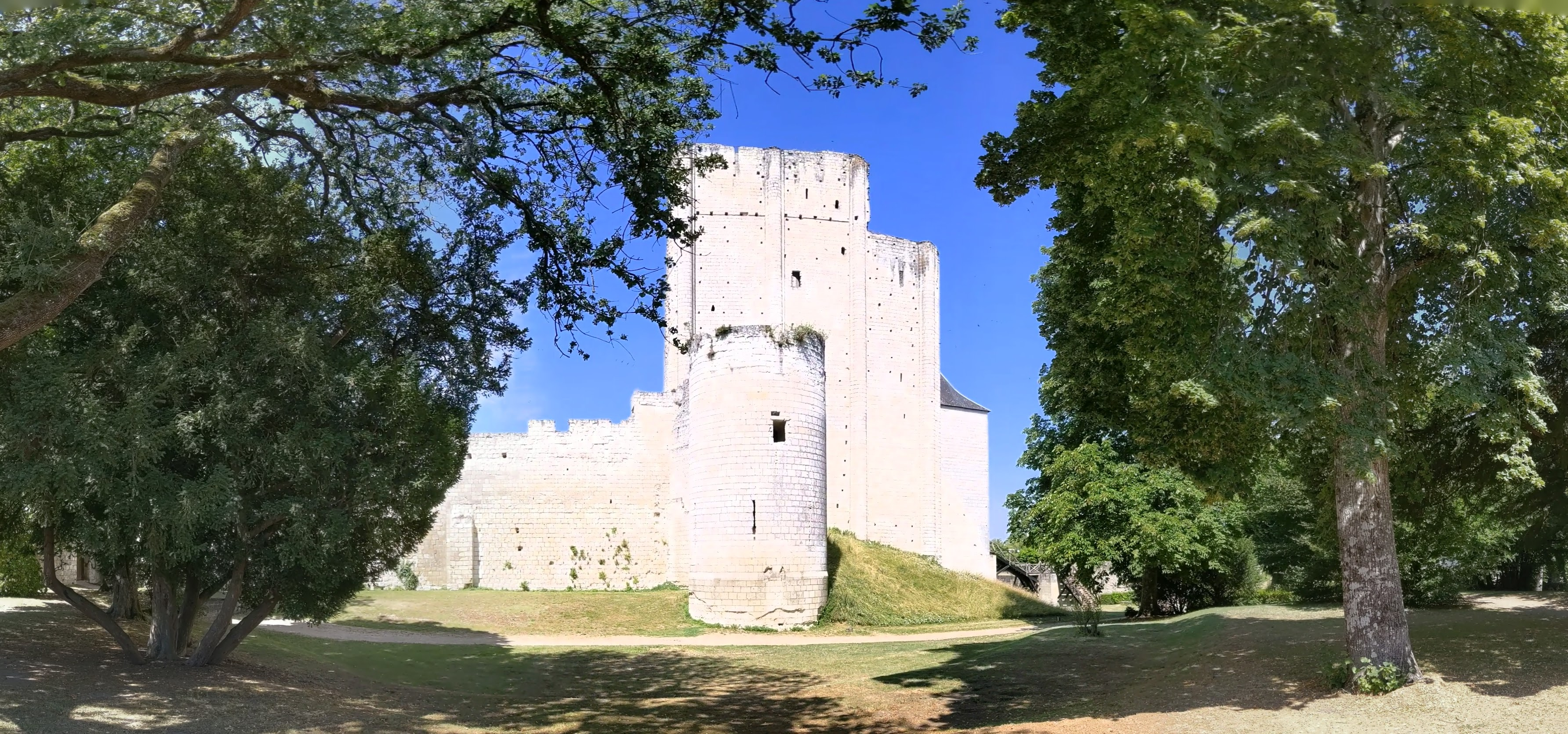
  View of Loches Donjon (keep) from the East, inside the City wall
