= Rapunzel =

German fairy tale

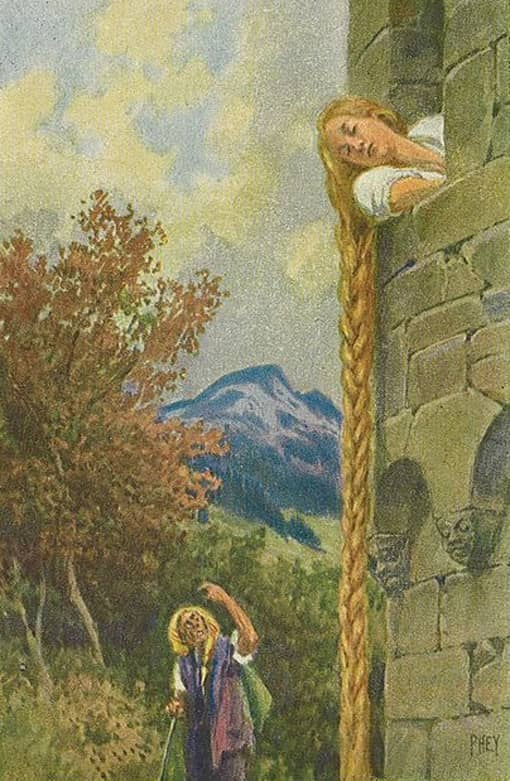

Folk tale
- Name: Rapunzel
- Aarne–Thompson grouping: ATU 310 (The Maiden in the Tower)
- Mythology: European
- Published in: Grimms' Fairy Tales

"Rapunzel" (/rəˈpʌnzəl/ rə-PUN-zəl; German: [ʁaˈpʊnt͡sl̩]; French: Raiponce or Persinette) is a German fairy tale most notably recorded by the Brothers Grimm and published in 1812 as part of Children's and Household Tales (KHM 12). The Grimms' story was developed from the French literary fairy tale of Persinette by Charlotte-Rose de Caumont de La Force (1698), which itself is an alternative version of the Italian fairy tale Petrosinella by Giambattista Basile (1634).

The tale is classified as Aarne–Thompson type 310 ("The Maiden in The Tower"). Its plot has been used and parodied in various media. Its best known line is, "Rapunzel, Rapunzel, let down your hair."

== Plot ==
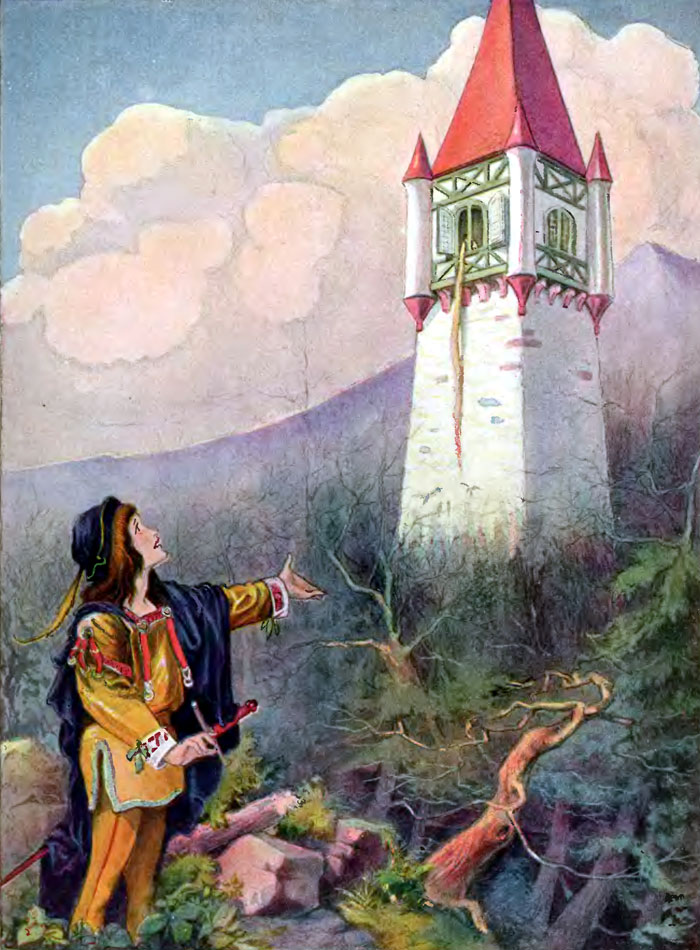
Illustration by Johnny Gruelle

After years of wishing for a child, a couple is expecting their first baby. The husband and wife live next to a large high-walled flower and herb garden belonging to a sorceress. (Note: In the version of the story given by J. Achim Christoph Friedrich Schulz in his Kleine Romane (1790), which was the Grimms' direct source, the owner of the garden is a fairy (Fee), and also appears as such in the Grimms' first edition of Kinder- und Hausmärchen (1812); by the final edition of 1857 the Grimms had deliberately Germanized the story by changing her to the more Teutonic "sorceress" (Zauberin), just as they had changed the original "prince" (Prinz) to the Germanic "son of a king" (Königssohn). At no point, however, do they refer to her as a "witch" (German: Hexe), despite the common modern impression.) The wife craves the rapunzel (which is either cornsalad or rampion) that she sees growing in the garden. She refuses to eat anything else and begins to waste away. Her husband fears for her life and one night, he scales the garden wall to steal some rapunzel for her. When the man returns home, his wife makes a salad out of the rapunzel and eats it. But the next day, the wife craves more rapunzel, so her husband returns to the garden that night to steal some more. As he climbs down the garden wall, the sorceress catches him and accuses him of theft. The man begs for mercy and explains his wife's condition. The sorceress agrees to be lenient, allowing the man to take all the rapunzel he wants on the condition that the baby be given to her when it is born. (Note: In some variants of the story, the request takes a more riddling form, e.g. the foster mother demands "that which is under your belt." In other variants, the mother, worn out by the child's crying, wishes someone would take it away, whereupon the foster-mother appears to claim it.) Desperate, he agrees. (Note: Different versions disagree whether the sorceress had deliberately caused her pregnant neighbour to crave the rapunzel in the first place, to justify taking the baby, or if it was just a coincidence that the sorceress exploited when the opportunity presented itself.)

When the wife gives birth to a baby girl, the sorceress takes her to raise as her own and names her "Rapunzel" after the plant her mother had craved. Rapunzel grows up to be a beautiful child with long golden hair. (Note: In Schulz, this is caused by the fairy herself, who sprinkles the child with a "precious liquid/perfume/ointment" (German: kostbaren Wasser). According to Schulz, her hair is 30 ells (112 1/2 feet or 34.3 metres) long, but not at all uncomfortable for her to wear; in the Grimms, it hangs 20 ells (75 feet or 23 meters) from the window-hook to the ground.) When she turns 12, the sorceress locks her up in a tower in the middle of the woods, with neither stairs nor a door, and only one room and one window at the top. (Note: In Schulz's 1790 version of the story, the fairy's purpose is to protect Rapunzel from an "unlucky star" which threatens her; the Grimms (deliberately seeking to return to a more archaic form of the story and perhaps influenced by Basile's Italian variant) make the fairy/sorceress a much more threatening figure.) In order to visit Rapunzel, the sorceress stands at the bottom of the tower and calls out:

Rapunzel!
Rapunzel!
Let down your hair
That I may climb thy golden stair! (Note: Schulz, "Rapunzel, laß deine Haare 'runter, daß ich 'rauf kann." ("Rapunzel, let down thy hairs, so I can [climb] up."); Grimms, "Rapunzel, Rapunzel, laß dein Haar herunter!" ("Rapunzel, Rapunzel, let downwards thy hair!").)

Whenever Rapunzel hears that rhyme, (Note: Jacob Grimm ostensibly believed that the strong alliteration of the rhyme indicated that it was a survival of the ancient form of Germanic poetry known as Stabreim, but in actuality, it was his liberal adaption of Schulz's direct German translation of Charlotte-Rose de Caumont de La Force's older French version "Persinette, Persinette, descendez vos cheveux que je monte".) she fastens her long braided hair to a hook in the window before letting it fall 20 yards to the ground, and the sorceress climbs it.

A few years later, a prince rides through the forest and hears Rapunzel singing from the tower. Entranced by her ethereal voice, he searches for her and discovers the tower, but is unable to get in. The prince returns to the tower often, listening to Rapunzel's beautiful singing, and one day sees the sorceress visit her as usual and learns how to gain access. When the sorceress leaves, the prince bids Rapunzel to let her hair down. Thinking it is the sorceress calling her again, Rapunzel lets down her hair and the prince climbs up. The two then fall in love and secretly marry. As the sorceress visits Rapunzel by day, the couple plans a means of escape: the prince will bring his wife a strand of silk every night until she has enough to make a ladder for her to climb down the tower and ride away with him on horseback.

Before the couple's escape plan can come to fruition, however, the sorceress visits one day and Rapunzel innocently asks her why all her clothes are tight around the waist (this part comes from the 1812 original edition of Kinder- und Hausmärchen or Children's and Household Tales, most commonly known in English as Grimms' Fairy Tales; in later editions, Rapunzel instead asks "Dame Gothel", (Note: German: Frau Gothel. She refers to the previously unnamed sorceress by this title only at this point in the Grimms' story. The use of Frau in early modern German was more restricted, and referred only to a woman of noble birth, rather than to any woman as in modern German. Gothel (or Göthel, Göthle, Göthe, etc.) was originally not a personal name, but an occupational one meaning "midwife, wet nurse, foster mother, godparent".) in a moment of forgetfulness, why it is easier for her to draw up the prince than her). In anger, the sorceress cuts off Rapunzel's hair and banishes her into the wilderness to fend for herself.

When the prince calls that night, the sorceress hooks Rapunzel's severed hair and lets it down to haul him up. To the prince's horror and shock, he finds himself meeting the sorceress instead of Rapunzel. After the sorceress tells the prince in a rage that he will never see Rapunzel again, he throws himself from the tower, landing in a patch of thorns. Although the prince survives, the thorns blind him. A month later, Rapunzel gives birth in the wilderness to her twin children with the prince – a boy and a girl.

For some years, the blind prince wanders through the wastelands of the country and eventually comes to the wilderness where Rapunzel has been living with their children. One day, as Rapunzel sings, the prince hears her voice again, and they are reunited. When they fall into each other's arms, Rapunzel sheds tears, two of which fall into the prince's eyes, immediately restoring his sight. The prince leads Rapunzel and their children to his kingdom where they live happily ever after. (Note: In Schulz, the fairy, relenting from her anger, transports the whole family to his father's palace in her flying carriage.)

Another version of the story ends with the revelation that the sorceress had untied Rapunzel's hair after the prince leapt from the tower, and it slipped from her hands and landed far below, leaving her trapped in the tower.

== Origin and development ==
=== Mythological and religious inspiration ===
Some researchers have proposed that the earliest possible inspiration for the "Maiden in the Tower" archetype is to the proto-Indo-European sun or dawn goddess myths, in which the light deity is trapped and is rescued. Similar myths include that of the Baltic solar goddess, Saulė, who is held captive in a tower by a king. Inspiration may also be taken from the classical myth of the hero, Perseus; Perseus' mother, the Princess Danaë, was confined to a bronze tower by her own father, Acrisius, the King of Argos, in an attempt to prevent her from becoming pregnant, as it was foretold by the Oracle of Delphi that she would bear a son who would kill his grandfather.

Inspiration may come from Ethniu, daughter of Balor, in Irish myth.

Inspiration may also come from the story of Saint Barbara of Nicomedia, who is said to have been a beautiful woman who was confined to a tower by her father to protect her from bad influences. While in the tower, she is said to have converted to Christianity and be ultimately martyred for her faith after a series of miracles delaying her execution. Her story was included in The Book of the City of Ladies, completed by 1405 by Christine de Pizan in vernacular French, which may have been highly influential on later writers, as it was popular throughout Europe.

=== Literary development ===
The earliest surviving reference to a female character with long hair that she offers to a male lover to climb like a ladder appears in the Persian epic poem Shahnameh, written by Ferdowsi between c. 977 and 1010 AD. The heroine of the story, Rudāba, offers her hair so that her love interest Zāl may enter the harem where she lives. Zāl instead uses a rope he had his servant brought with him so that she will not hurt herself.

The first written record of a story that may be recognized as Rapunzel is Giambattista Basile's Petrosinella, translating to parsley, which was published in Naples in the local dialect in 1634 in a collection entitled Lo cunto de li cunti (The Tale of Tales). This version of the story differs from later versions as it is the wife not the husband who steals the plant, the maiden is taken by the villain as a child rather than a baby, and the maiden and the prince are not separated for years to be reunited in the end. Most importantly, this version of the story contains a "flight" scene in which Petrosinella uses magic acorns that turn into animals to distract the ogress while she pursues the couple fleeing the tower. This "flight" scene, with three magic objects used as distraction, is found in oral variants in the Mediterranean region, notably Sicily (Angiola), Malta (Little Parsley and Little Fennel), and Greece (Anthousa the Fair with Golden Hair).

In 1697, Charlotte-Rose de Caumont de La Force published a variation of the story, Persinette, while confined to an abbey due to perceived misconduct during service in the court of Louis XIV. Before her imprisonment, de la Force was a prominent figure in the Parisian salons and considered one of the early conteuses as a contemporary to Charles Perrault. This version of the story includes almost all elements that were found in later versions by the Grimm Brothers. It is the first version to include the maiden's out of wedlock pregnancy, the villain's trickery leading to the prince's blinding, the birth of twins, and the tears of the maiden restoring the prince's sight. The tale ends with the antagonist taking pity on the couple and transporting them to the prince's kingdom. While de la Force's claim that Persinette was an original story cannot be substantiated, her version was the most complex at the time and did introduce original elements.

=== German adaptation ===
The first known German translation of Charlotte-Rose de Caumont de La Force's tale Persinette came about in 1766 by Friedrich Immanuel Bierling under the name "Das Cabinet der Feen. Oder gesammelte Feen-Märchen in neun Theilen, Aus dem Französischen übersetzt", published in Nürenberg. More famously, Persinette was translated into German by Friedrich Schulz and appeared in 1790 in Kleine Romane (Little Novels), as it was Schulz who changed the plant and the maiden's name to Rapunzel. Jacob and Wilhelm Grimm included the story in their first (1812) and seventh (1857) edition publications of Children's and Household Tales and removed elements that they believed were added to the "original" German fairy tale. Although the Grimms' recounting of the fairy tale is the most prevalent version of the "Maiden in the Tower" in the western literary canon, the story does not appear to have connections to a Germanic oral folktale tradition. Notably, the 1812 publication retains the out of wedlock pregnancy that reveals the prince's visits to the witch, whereas in the 1857 version edited by Wilhelm Grimm, it is Rapunzel's slip of the tongue to address criticism that the tale was not appropriate for children. It can be argued that the 1857 version of the story was the first written for a primarily child-aged audience.

=== Distribution ===
According to Greek folklorist Georgios A. Megas, fellow folklorist Michael Meracles concluded that the tale type originated in Southeastern Europe, by analysing 22 Greek variants, 2 Serbo-Croatian and 1 from Corsica.

Scholar Jack Zipes stated that the tale type is "extremely popular throughout Europe". However, scholar Ton Deker remarked that the tale type is "mainly known" in Central and South Europe, and in the Middle East. In the same vein, Stith Thompson argued for a Mediterranean origin for the story, due to "its great popularity" in Italy and nearby countries.

Scholar Ulrich Marzolph remarked that the tale type AT 310 was one of "the most frequently encountered tales in Arab oral tradition", albeit missing from The Arabian Nights compilation.

== Themes and characterization ==
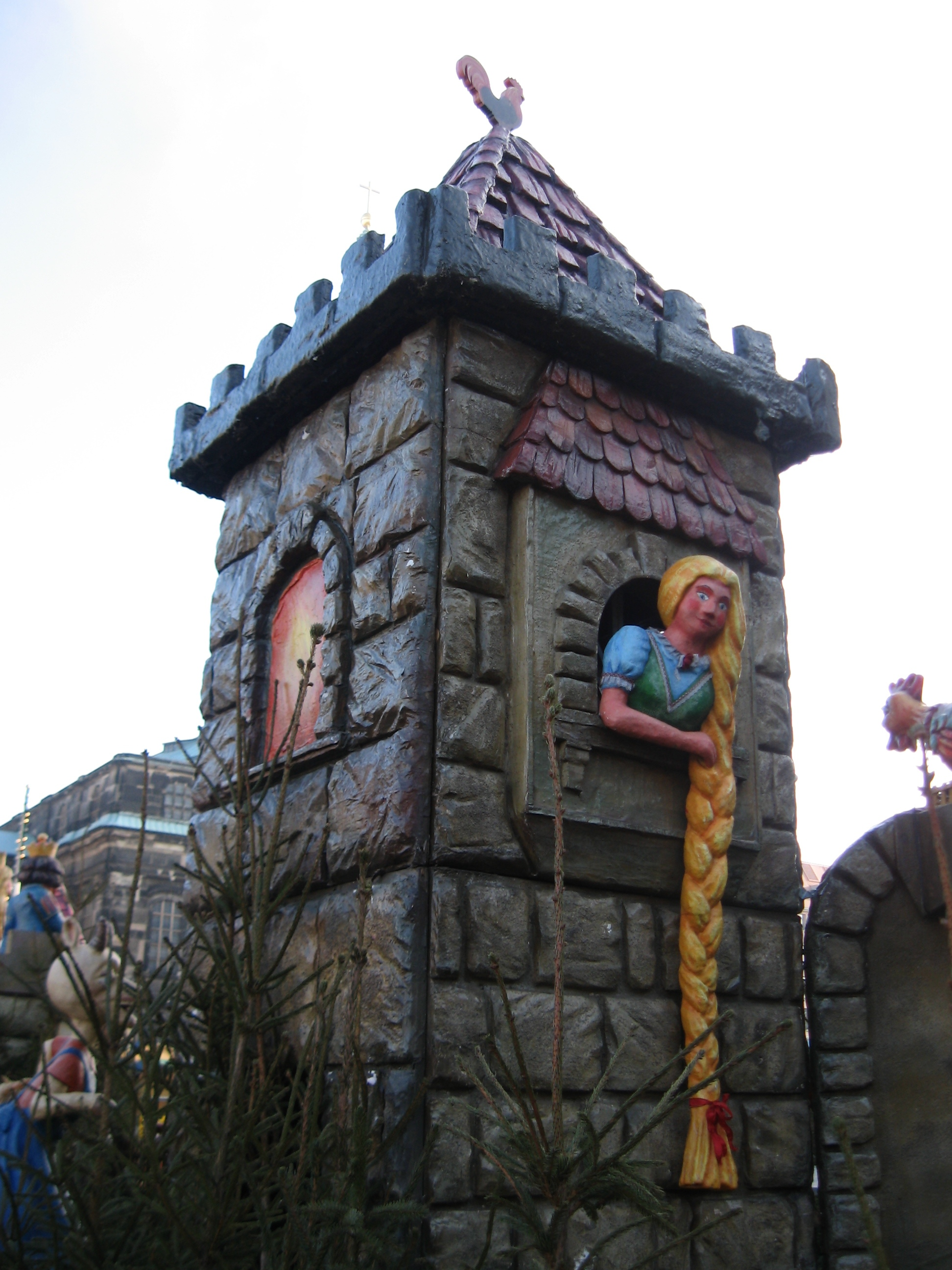
Rapunzel in Dresden, Saxony, Germany

Many scholars have interpreted "Maiden in the Tower" stories, which Rapunzel is a part of, as a metaphor for the protection of young women from pre-marital relationships by overzealous guardians. Scholars have drawn comparisons of the confinement of Rapunzel in her tower to that of a convent, where women's lives were highly controlled and they lived in exclusion from outsiders.

Scholars have also noted the strong theme of love conquering all in the story, as the lovers are united after years of searching in all versions after Persinette and are ultimately happily reunited as a family.

The seemingly unfair bargain that the husband makes with the sorceress in the opening of Rapunzel is a common convention in fairy tales, which is replicated in Jack and the Beanstalk, when Jack trades a cow for beans, and in Beauty and the Beast, when Beauty comes to the Beast in return for a rose. Furthermore, folkloric beliefs often regarded it as dangerous to deny a pregnant woman any food she craved, making the bargain with the sorceress more understandable, since the husband would have perceived his actions as saving his wife at the cost of his child. Family members would often go to great lengths to secure such cravings, and such desires for lettuce and other vegetables may indicate a need for vitamins.

The "Maiden in the Tower" archetype has drawn comparisons to a possible lost matriarchal myth connected to the sacred marriage between the prince and the maiden and the rivalry between the maiden, representing life and spring, and the crone, representing death and winter.

== Cultural legacy ==
=== Literary media ===
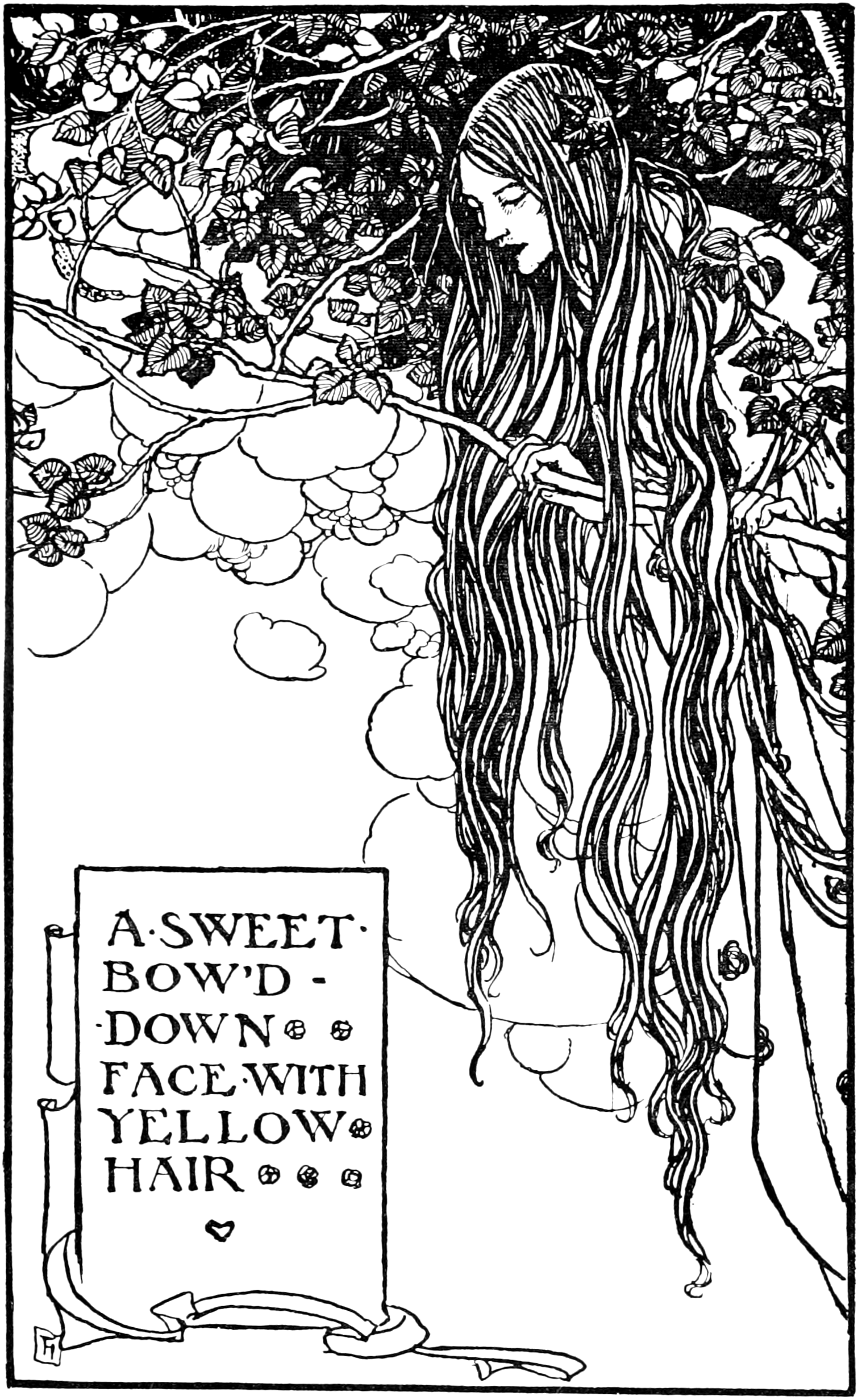
Florence Harrison's illustration for Rapunzel in a collection of early poems by William Morris

Andrew Lang included the story in his 1890 publication The Red Fairy Book. Other versions of the tale also appear in A Book of Witches (1965) by Ruth Manning-Sanders and in Paul O. Zelinsky's Caldecott Medal-winning picture book, Rapunzel (1997).

Anne Sexton wrote a poem called "Rapunzel" in her collection Transformations (1971), a book in which she re-envisions sixteen of the Grimm's Fairy tales.

Donna Jo Napoli's novel Zel (1996) retells the Rapunzel story from three perspectives: the maiden, her mother, and the prince.

Cress is the third book in The Lunar Chronicles, a young adult science fiction series written by Marissa Meyer that is an adaptation of Rapunzel. Crescent, nicknamed "Cress", is a prisoner on a satellite who is rescued and falls in love with her hero "Captain Thorne" amidst the story about "Cinder" a cyborg version of Cinderella.

Kate Forsyth has written two books about Rapunzel, one is a fictional retelling of the tale and of the life of Mademoiselle de la Force entitled, Bitter Greens, and her second book was non-fiction describing the development of the tale entitled, The Rebirth of Rapunzel: A Mythic Biography of the Maiden in the Tower.

In Nikita Gill's 2018 poetry collection Fierce Fairytales: & Other Stories to Stir Your Soul she has several poems that reference Rapunzel or Rapunzel's story including Rapunzel's Note Left for Mother Gothel and Rapunzel, Rapunzel.

In 2022, Mary McMyne published a standalone adult historical fantasy novel The Book of Gothel, which speculates that the witch's character was inspired by the life of a medieval midwife named Haelewise, daughter-of-Hedda, who lived in 12th century Germania. The novel is a revisionist backstory for Rapunzel that also connects to elements of Snow White, Little Red Riding Hood, and other tales.

In 2025, Indian author Rajesh Talwar published The Witch, the Princess and the Tower of Doom, a reimagining of the classic fairy tale set within an Indian cultural framework. The story incorporates regional elements such as idlis and vadas, and blends traditional myth and folklore to create a uniquely localized narrative.

=== Film media ===
- The Story of Rapunzel (1951), a stop-motion animated short directed by Ray Harryhausen.
- A 1988 German film adaption, Rapunzel oder Der Zauber der Tränen (meaning "Rapunzel or the Magic of Tears"), combines the story with the lesser-known Grimm fairy tale Maid Maleen. After escaping the tower, Rapunzel finds work as a kitchen maid in the prince's court, where she must contend with an evil princess who aims to marry him.
- A 1990 straight-to-video animated film adaptation produced by Hanna-Barbera and Hallmark Cards for the series Timeless Tales from Hallmark, simply titled Rapunzel, features Olivia Newton-John narrating the story.
- Into the Woods is a musical combining elements from several classic fairy tales, in which Rapunzel is one of the main characters; it was also filmed for television in 1991 by American Playhouse. The story depicts Rapunzel as the adoptive daughter of the Witch. In the second half of the play, Rapunzel is killed by the Giant's Wife. A film adaptation of Into the Woods by The Walt Disney Company was released late in 2014 where Rapunzel is portrayed by MacKenzie Mauzy.
- This story is adapted in the 1999 animated series Simsala Grimm. In this version, the witch (Frau Gothel) pretends to be the prince (named Prince Egmund in this version) to climb Rapunzel's hair. It is revealed that her biological parents are turned to stone, so when Doc Croc turned Frau Gothel to stone, Rapunzel, her biological parents and Prince Egmund are free.
- In Barbie as Rapunzel (2002), Rapunzel was raised by the evil witch Gothel (voiced by Anjelica Huston) and she acted as a servant for her. She uses a magic paintbrush to get out of captivity, but Gothel locks her away in a tower.
- In Shrek the Third (2007), Rapunzel (voiced by Maya Rudolph) was friends with Princess Fiona. She is shown to be the true love of the evil Prince Charming and helps to fool Princess Fiona and her group when they try to escape from Prince Charming's wrath. During Charming’s stage performance, the Gingerbread Man uses her hair as a bungee cord to descend the tower, revealing it to be a wig. A bald and humiliated Rapunzel flees the stage.
- Walt Disney Animation Studios' Tangled (2010), which is a loose retelling and a CGI-animated musical feature film. Princess Rapunzel (voiced by Mandy Moore) is more assertive in character, and was born a princess. Rapunzel also features in the short sequel, Tangled Ever After and its prequel film, Tangled: Before Ever After.
- Walt Disney Pictures hired Ashleigh Powell to write the script for a live-action Rapunzel movie. It is unknown if the film will be a remake of Tangled, a new adaptation, or a combination of both. In April 2025, the movie was put on hold indefinitely due to the commercial failure of Snow White (2025).

=== Television media ===
==== Live-action television media ====
- Shirley Temple's Storybook (1958–1961) featured a media of Rapunzel in an episode which aired on 27 October 1958. Carol Lynley played Rapunzel and Agnes Moorehead played the evil witch.
- The fictional TV show, "The Flora Follicle Show" on Slim Goodbody in Nutri-City had a direct reference to the Rapunzel story, as Flora Follicle played Rapunzel to Lustre Lanolin's Prince Charming.
- In the American fairy tale miniseries, The Tenth Kingdom (2000), the main character, Virginia Lewis is cursed by a Gypsy witch. As a result, she grows hair reminiscent of Rapunzel's and is locked away by the Huntsman in a tower.
- Rapunzel appears in the Once Upon a Time episode The Tower (2014), portrayed by Alexandra Metz. A second iteration of Rapunzel appears as one of the main antagonists in the seventh season of Once Upon a Time (Season 7, 2018), portrayed by Gabrielle Anwar and Meegan Warner in flashbacks. In this season, Rapunzel is Lady Tremaine, the wicked stepmother to Cinderella.
- The video of the song "Circles" by Post Malone is inspired by the story of Rapunzel.

==== Animated television media ====
- Adapted into Grimm's Fairy Tale Classics, a 1987-1989 anime series, this version reveals Rapunzel's mother berating and blackmailing her husband into getting the Rapunzel. As Rapunzel grows up in a tower, she is shown to play the lyre. Later, when the witch cuts off Rapunzel's hair after realizing the prince's visits, she beats her unconscious with her stick. Fortunately, the English version cut this out. After the exile from the tower, the girl gave birth to a son rather than twins.
- The American television animated anthology series, Happily Ever After: Fairy Tales for Every Child (1995-2000), the classic story is retold with a full African-American cast and set in New Orleans. The episode starred Tisha Campbell-Martin as Rapunzel, Whoopi Goldberg as Zenobia the Hoodoo Diva, Meshach Taylor as the Woodcutter, Hazelle Goodman as the Woodcutter's Wife, Donald Fullilove as Friend #1, and Tico Wells as Friend #2.
- The Mattel cartoon Ever After High (2013–2017), features Rapunzel's identical twin daughters: Holly and Poppy O'Hair.
- Rapunzel's Tangled Adventure (2017–2020) is a 2D animated TV show based on Disney Animation's computer-animated musical feature film Tangled. Mandy Moore and Zachary Levi reprise their roles of Rapunzel and Eugene Fitzherbert. A new main character named Cassandra appears, who is Rapunzel's feisty lady-in-waiting, and later revealed to be Mother Gothel's biological daughter.

== See also ==
- Danaë, daughter of King Acrisius and Queen Eurydice, who was trapped in a bronze tower or cave
- Ethniu, daughter of Balor
- Maid Maleen
- Puddocky
- Rapunzel syndrome

== Bibliography ==
- Grimm, Jacob and Wilhelm (1884). Grimm's Household Tales: With the Author's Notes (Kinder- und Hausmärchen). Vol. 1. Translated by Margaret Hunt. London: George Bell and Sons.
- Schulz, Friedrich (2012). Kleine Romane. Nabu Press. ISBN 978-1273559877.
