= Charlotte-Rose de Caumont de La Force =

French novelist and poet

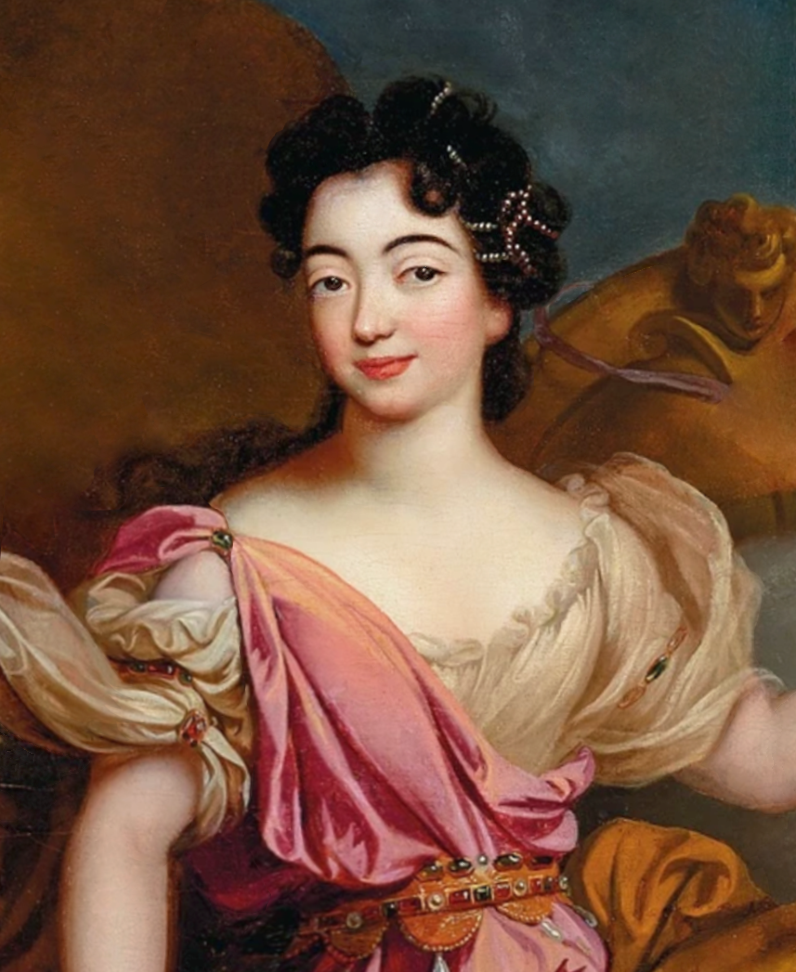
- Madamoiselle de la Force as Flora, 17th century oil painting from the circle of Pierre Mignard
- Born: 1650
- Died: 1724 (aged 73–74)
- Occupations: Writer, poet, and satirist
- Writing career
- Subjects: Fantasy; Satire
- Notable work: Persinette (1698)

Charlotte-Rose de Caumont de La Force, Charlotte-Rose Caumont La Force, or Mademoiselle de La Force (1650–1724) was a French novelist and poet. Her best-known work was her 1698 fairy tale Persinette, which was adapted by the Brothers Grimm in 1812 as the story Rapunzel.

== Life ==
Charlotte was born around 1650 in Castelmoron to François de Caumont de La Force, marquis of Castelmoron and son of Marshal de La Force, and his wife Marguerite de Viçose. Her family were prominent Huguenots descended from Périgord. Through her mother, she was related to another female writer: Henriette-Julie de Castelnau.

Charlotte was raised a Huguenot, but converted to Catholicism in 1685 after the Edict of Fontainebleau was issued. She frequented the social circles of Louis XIV, and was known to him personally. He accorded her an annual pension of 1000 écus and named her a fille d'honneur to several women at court, including the dauphine. She was named a member of the Academy of the Ricovrati of Padua in 1698.

She had a long affair with Charles de Briou, and married him in 1687 without the permission of his father. She was 32 and he was 26. Both families intervened, and after a lengthy trial, their marriage was annulled in 1689.

In 1697, due to gossip and scandalous rumors about her, the king forced Charlotte to take to the Benedictine abbey of Gercy-en-Brie in Varennes-Jarcy or risk losing her pension. It was from here that she wrote her memoir: Pensées chrétiennes de défunte de Mlle de La Force. She remained at the abbey until 1713.

== Career ==
Her first novels were in the popular vein of "histoires secrètes," short novels recounting the "secret history" of a famous person and linking the action generally to an amorous intrigue, such as Histoire secrete de Bourgogne (1694), Histoire secrète de Henri IV, roi de Castille (1695), Histoire de Marguerite de Valois, reine de Navarre (1696).

After moving into the abbey, Charlotte wrote her memoir: Pensées chrétiennes de défunte de Mlle de La Force. She also wrote her most well-known work: Les Contes des Contes, published in 1698. It is a collection of fairytales containing the story Persinette, which influenced the Rapunzel story popularized by the Brothers Grimm.

She is also well known for participating in the 17th century vogue of contes des fées along with Henriette-Julie de Murat, Marie Catherine d'Aulnoy, Marie-Jeanne Lhéritier, and Charles Perrault. She wrote Les Contes des Contes (1698) and Les Contes des Fées. These works included the tale Fairer-than-a-Fairy.

== In Literature ==
Charlotte is featured as a main character in Kate Forsyth's Bitter Greens; a fairy-tale retelling of the Rapunzel tale.

== Works ==
=== Fairy tales ===
- La Bonne Femme (The Good Woman)
- La Puissance d'Amour
- Le Pays des Délices
- L'Enchanteur (The Enchanter)
- Persinette
- Plus Belle que Fée (Fairer-than-a-Fairy)
- Tourbillon
- Vert et Bleu (Green and Blue)

=== Novels ===
- Histoire secrete de Bourgogne (1694)
- Histoire secrete de Henri IV, roi de Castille (1695)
- Histoire de Marguerite de Valois, reine de Navarre, Soeur de Francois I (1696)
- Anecdotes du seizieme siecle, ou Intrigues de cour, politiques, et galantes : avec les portraits de Charles IX, Henri III & Henri IV, rois de France & de Navarre
- Les jeux d'esprit, ou, La promenade de la princesse de Conti à Eu

== Sources ==
- Dandrey, Patrick, ed. Dictionnaire des lettres françaises: Le XVIIe siècle. Collection: La Pochothèque. Paris: Fayard, 1996.
- Souloumiac, Michel (2004). Mademoiselle de la Force: Un auteur méconnu du XVIIe siècle. Association de Recherches Archéologiques et Historiques du Pays de la Force.
- Les Contes des Contes Premier Tom
- Contes Mademoiselle Force
