= Belinda Murrell =

Australian author

- Occupation: Author
- Genre: Children's literature
- Years active: 2000s–present
- Notable works: Lulu Bell series

Belinda Murrell is an Australian author. She is the author of the Lulu Bell children's book series.

== Early life ==
Murrell grew up in Sydney and attended Abbotsleigh.

== Career ==
After studying literature at Macquarie University, Murrell worked as a technical writer, freelance journalist, travel writer, public relations consultant, editor, writing teacher, and author.

== Personal life ==
Murrell lives in Manly with her husband, Rob, and three children. Her sister, Kate Forsyth, is also an author.
