= Jacqueline Harvey =

Australian author (born 1969)

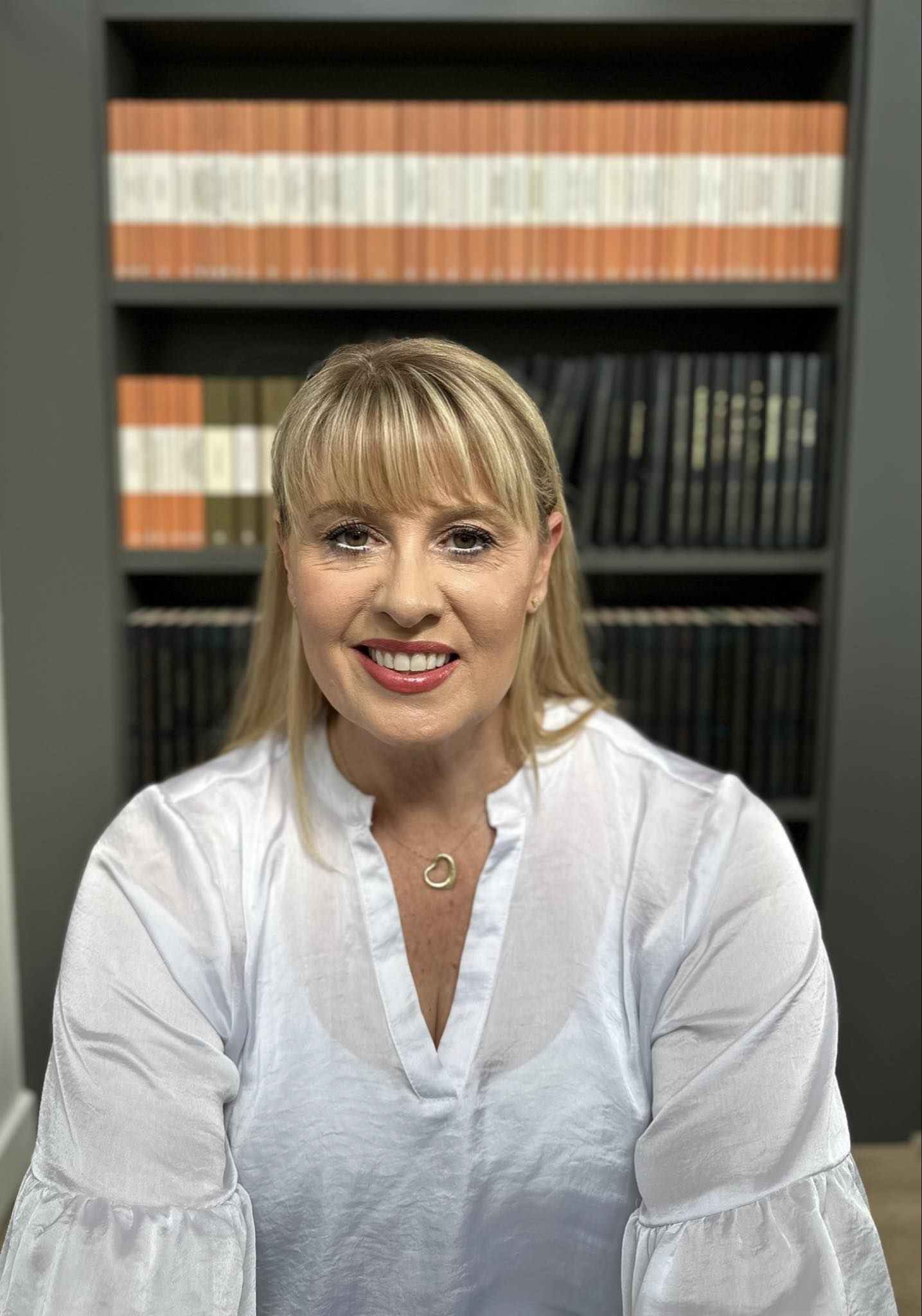
- Harvey in 2024
- Born: 1969 (age 56–57) Australia
- Occupation: Author, teacher
- Notable works: Alice-Miranda series Clementine Rose series

Website
- www.jacquelineharvey.com.au

Jacqueline Harvey (born 1969) is an Australian author. She is best known for her Alice-Miranda and Clementine Rose book series.

Harvey worked as a teacher at Abbotsleigh from 2001 to 2012, including as deputy head. While teaching, she started writing novels, and her first book, Code Name Mr Right, was published in 2003. Since 2012, when she resigned from teaching, she has pursued writing as a full-time career.
