= Carolyn Chappell Lougee =

American historian

Academic background
- Education: University of Michigan
- Thesis: Feminism and social stratification in seventeenth-century France (1974)

Carolyn Chappell Lougee is an American historian specializing in the social history of early modern France, with a particular focus on women's history and the Huguenot diaspora. She is the Frances and Charles Field Professor in History at Stanford University.

== Education and career ==
Lougee earned an A.B. from Smith College. She then went on to complete an M.A. and a Ph.D. from the University of Michigan. In 1973 Lougee moved to Stanford University, and as of 2025 Lougee is the Frances and Charles Field Professor in History. Lougee held the position of dean and department chair, in addition to serving as the undergraduate dean.

== Research ==
Lougee's research focuses on the social history of early modern France, with particular emphasis on women's history and the Huguenot diaspora.

Lougee developed the historical simulation software The Would-Be Gentleman in the late 1980s, which was later setup within an emulator in 2021 in order to allow its further use.

== Selected publications ==
- Lougee, Carolyn C.; Chappell, Carolyn Lougee (1976). Le Paradis De Femmes. Princeton, N. J: Princeton, N.J. : Princeton University Press. ISBN 978-0-691-05239-7.
- Chappell, Carolyn Lougee (1999). ""The Pains I Took to Save My/His Family": Escape Accounts by a Huguenot Mother and Daughter after the Revocation of the Edict of Nantes". French Historical Studies. 22 (1): 1–64. doi:10.2307/286701. ISSN 0016-1071. JSTOR 286701.
- Facing the Revocation: Huguenot Families, Faith, and the King's Will (Oxford University Press, 2016)
- Lougee, Carolyn Chappell (2017). "How the Field Was Won: Susan Groag Bell and Women's History". Journal of Women's History. 29 (3): 190–194. doi:10.1353/jowh.2017.0041. ISSN 1527-2036.

== Honors and awards ==
In 2016 Lougee received the David Pinkney Prize for the most distinguished work in French history from the Society for French Historical Studies, and the Frances Richardson Keller-Sierra Prize for the best history monograph from the Western Association of Women Historians. In 2018 she received the award for Best Scholarly Work from the National Huguenot Society.
