= Kate Forsyth =

Australian author

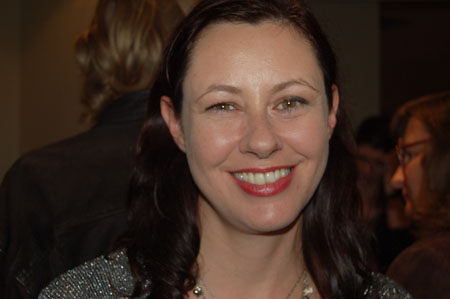
- Kate Forsyth in 2007.
- Born: Katherine Emma Humphrey; 3 June 1966 (age 60); Sydney, Australia
- Occupations: Writer; poet; journalist
- Writing career
- Genres: Historical fiction; children's literature; fantasy
- Website: www.kateforsyth.com.au

Kate Forsyth (born 3 June 1966) is an Australian author. She is best known for her historical novel Bitter Greens, which interweaves a retelling of the Rapunzel fairy tale with the true life story of the woman who first told the tale, the 17th century French writer Charlotte-Rose de Caumont de La Force.

Forsyth is also the author of several children's books, including The Gypsy Crown, The Puzzle Ring, The Starthorn Tree, The Wildkin's Curse, The Starkin Crown and Dragon Gold. She has also published two heroic fantasy series, The Witches of Eileanan and Rhiannon's Ride, the poetry collection Radiance, and the novel Full Fathom Five under her maiden name, Kate Humphrey. She is a five-time Aurealis Award winner.

She is married with three children, and lives in Sydney, New South Wales. She is also a direct descendant of Charlotte Barton, the author of Australia's earliest known children's book. Forsyth's older sister, Belinda Murrell, is also an author for children and young adults and their younger brother, Nick Humphrey, is a nonfiction author.

== Journalism ==
After graduating in a Bachelor of Arts in Literature from Macquarie University, Forsyth worked as a full-time journalist, including Editor of Hair and deputy editor of Money Watch before quitting to work freelance, writing articles for Vogue Australia, Black+White, Studio Bambini, Mode Brides, Interiors and Australian Collections amongst others.

Freelancing allowed her to concentrate more on her poetry and to be President of the Poets Union. She publishes her poetry under her maiden name, Kate Humphrey. This has appeared in Australian newspapers, such as The Sydney Morning Herald, The Age, and The Bulletin, and domestic and international literary magazines.

== Author ==
Writing in The Sydney Morning Herald Melanie Kembrey rates Forsyth as an "internationally acclaimed author...best known for her re-imaginings of fairy stories from a feminist perspective."

Forsyth wrote "Full Fathom Five" as the thesis for her Master of Arts in Writing, and then, to relieve the tedium of studying theorists such as Lacan, Derrida and de Saussure for her exams, she started reading a multi-book fantasy series. The turning point was when her husband, Greg Forsyth, suggested that she write such a series herself.

Forsyth undertook a doctorate in fairy-tale retelling at the University of Technology, Sydney. Her novel Bitter Greens was written as the creative component of her doctorate, which one reviewer felt resulted in a story that was "two books', and subsequently Forsyth examined the many different retellings of Rapunzel in The Rebirth of Rapunzel: A Mythic Biography of the Maiden in the Tower, which reviewer Belinda Calderone considers "remarkably clear" when "Forsyth is dealing with such a wide-ranging time period, and simultaneously presenting three kinds of writing.

Forsyth is active in presenting workshops for writers, and is a frequently a public speaker, often in schools, and also in literary festivals and conferences, bookshops, libraries and museums, on fantasy, folk tales and the role of women in them. With Joan London, Andy Griffiths and David Malouf she contributed to The Simple Act of Reading, a compilation of essays and memoir pieces detailing the way reading has guided these writers.

Forsyth is a generous mentor for, and collaborator with, other writers and creatives including co-author Kim Wilkins and illustrator Kathleen Jennings for The Silver Well, which won the 2017 Aurealis Award for Best Collection; Sarah Mills with whom she presented the combination cooking and book-review show Word of Mouth TV; artist Lorena Carrington with whom she partnered on Vasilisa the Wise and Other Tales of Brave Young Women in 2019 and others in their series of illustrated feminist fairy tales since; and with sister Belinda Murrell for joint research on their Searching for Charlotte.

== Reception ==
Of her The Rebirth of Rapunzel: A Mythic Biography of the Maiden in the Tower, Melissa Mullins writes that Forsyth "weaves together the strands of personal narrative, creative process, and historical and biographical detail, acknowledging that; "Forsyth has researched broadly and made connections relevant to the creative process. In addition, she collects a solid list of key critics in the field of fairy-tale and folklore studies; however, Forsyth’s treatment and interpretation of the ideas of these critics varies in its success."

Academics Fletcher, Driscoll and Wilkins, in defining Australian popular fiction and fantasy note that while Forsyth identifies as an Australian author descended from Australia’s first published children’s writer Charlotte Waring Atkinson, she is writing for a global readership, and only one of her 40 books is set in Australia.

Edward James in the Cambridge Companion to Fantasy Literature remarks on the domination in the first decade of the 21st century of the popular fantasy genre by Australian women, and Tierney includes Kate Forsyth amongst them, with Emily Rodda, Isobelle Carmody, Jessica Townsend, in "finding success in Australia and internationally," despite there being little distinctively 'Australian' about their works. She goes on to distinguish the recurrence of female characters in Forsyth's adult fiction "refusing to bow to societal norms" of patriarchy.

Grimm authority Cay Dollerup reviewing her historical novel The Wild Girl comments that "it is a tribute to the fundamental and inherent truths of the Grimm Tales that Kate Forsyth can, over a span of nearly 200 years, write a fascinating, humorous and also shocking novel based on their lives. It is loyal to is characters and communicates the concerns, the hopes, and fears of Germans during and after the Napoleon's wars in modern terms."

== Awards ==
Forsyth's work has won numerous Aurealis Awards: she won both the Aurealis and the William Atheling Jr. Award for The Rebirth of Rapunzel, and was given an honourable mention at the 2013 Norma K. Hemming Awards for Bitter Greens, for which she also won the American Library Association Award for Best Historical Novel

In 2018 she won the Australian Fairy Tale Society Award for her inspiration and contribution to Australian fairy tale culture.

== Works ==
=== Fiction ===
==== The Witches of Eileanan series ====
- Dragonclaw (1997) – released as The Witches of Eileanan in the US.
- The Pool of Two Moons (1998)
- The Cursed Towers (1999)
- The Forbidden Land (2000)
- The Skull of the World (2001)
- The Fathomless Caves (2002)

==== Rhiannon's Ride series ====
- The Tower of Ravens (2004)
- The Shining City (2005)
- The Heart of Stars (2006)

==== The Chain of Charms series (for 9-18-year olds) ====
- The Gypsy Crown (2006)
- The Silver Horse (2006)
- The Herb of Grace (2007)
- The Cat's Eye Shell (2007)
- The Lightning Bolt (2007)
- The Butterfly in Amber (2007)

==== Ben and Tim's Magical Misadventures (for young readers) ====
- Dragon Gold (2005)
- Wishing For Trouble (2006)
- Sea Magic (2008)

==== The Impossible Quest series ====
- Escape from Wolfhaven Castle (2014)
- The Wolves of the Witchwood (2015)
- The Beast of Blackmoor Bog (2015)
- The Drowned Kingdom (2015)
- Battle of The Heroes (2015)

==== The Chronicles of Estelliana ====
- The Starthorn Tree (2002)
- The Wildkin's Curse (2010)
- The Starkin Crown (May 2011)

==== Other children's and young adult books ====
- Forsyth, Kate (2013). The puzzle ring. Chippendale: Pan Australia. ISBN 978-1-74198-485-9. OCLC 870444383.
- Forsyth, Kate; Carrington, Lorena (2019). Vasilisa the wise: & other tales of brave young women. Kane Miller, a division of EDC. ISBN 978-1-61067-852-0. OCLC 1163936693.
- Forsyth, Kate; Brennan, Krista (2019). Once. Wombat Books. ISBN 978-1-925563-56-6. OCLC 1077702393.
- Forsyth, Kate; Carrington, Lorena (2019). The buried moon: & other tales of bright young women. Serenity Press. ISBN 978-0-6484000-0-4. OCLC 1089610230.
- Forsyth, Kate; Carrington, Lorena; Carmody, Isobelle (2020). Snow White Rose Red & other tales of kind young women. Serenity Press. ISBN 978-0-6486984-2-5. OCLC 1182876734.
- Forsyth, Kate; Carrington, Lorena (2021). The Gardener's Son and the Golden Bird: And other Tales of Gentle Young Men. Waikiki, WA: Serenity Press. ISBN 978-0-6450996-3-8. OCLC 1263749427.

==== Contemporary fiction ====
- Full Fathom Five – as Kate Humphrey (2003), a retelling of The Little Mermaid set in modern-day Australia
- Dancing on Knives (2014) revised version of Full Fathom Five – as Kate Forsyth

==== Historical fiction ====
- Bitter Greens (2012), a retelling of Rapunzel set in Renaissance Venice and fictionalised biography of Charlotte-Rose de Caumont de La Force
- The Wild Girl (March 2013), a retelling of All-Kinds-of-Fur based on the life of Wilhelm Grimm's wife Dortchen Wild
- The Beast's Garden (August 2015), a retelling of The Singing, Springing Lark set in Nazi Germany
- Beauty in Thorns (July 2017), a retelling of Sleeping Beauty and a fictionalised account of the history of the Pre-Raphaelite Brotherhood
- The Blue Rose (July 2019), a retelling of the tale The Blue Rose set in Revolutionary France and Imperial China
- The Crimson Thread (2022), a retelling of the Minotaur's myth set in World War II Greece

==== Other adults' books ====
- The Silver Well (2017) – short stories collection with Kim Wilkins

==== Short stories ====
- Love, Pain & Self-Will (1994) – as Kate Humphrey
- The Boy from the Monster Forest (1998)
- Morgan of the Fay (2002)
- The Key (2008)
- Count Stoneheart and the First Christmas Tree (2012)
- Two Selkie stories from Scotland, Christmas Press, 2014, ISBN 978-0-9922838-7-2, OCLC 903073107
- Tales of the Sidhe (2015), two tales later re-published in the collections Vasilisa the Wise and The Buried Moon

=== Non fiction ===
- The Rebirth of Rapunzel: A Mythic Biography of the Maiden in the Tower (2016)
- Searching for Charlotte (2020) – with her sister Belinda Murrell, a bibliomemoir about their ancestor Charlotte Waring Atkinson

=== Poetry ===
- Moths (1993)
- The Knowledge of Angels (1996)
- Night Vigil (1998) – as Kate Humphrey
- Siren Soul (1998) – as Kate Humphrey
- Falling from Grace (2000) – as Kate Humphrey
- I See My Life (2000) – as Kate Humphrey
- Midnight Garden (2000) – as Kate Humphrey
- World Lurches (2000) – as Kate Humphrey
- Mythologies (2004)
- Radiance (2004)

=== Essays ===
- Heroic Fantasy (1998)
- Fantasy Book Reviews (Aurealis, #33-35) (2004)
- Cecilia Dart-Thornton and The Crowthistle Chronicles (2008)
- Fantasy News (Aurealis #40) (2008)
- Alison Croggon and The Books of Pellinor (2008)
- The Forgotten Fairy Tale Tellers (2013)
- Introduction to The Year of Ancient Ghosts (2013)
- Thirteen Things I Love About Kim Wilkins (2013)
