= Louis de Sacy =

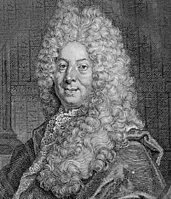
Louis de Sacy

Louis de Sacy (French pronunciation: [lwi də sasi]; 1654 in Paris – 26 October 1727 in Paris) was a French author, and lawyer. He was the third member elected to occupy seat 2 of the Académie française in 1701. De Sacy was particularly known for his elegant translations of Pliny the Younger's Epistulae and Panegyricus Traiani.

== Bibliography ==
- Lettres de Pline le Jeune (1699–1701)
- Traité de l’amitié (1703)
- Traité de la gloire (1715)
