= Lewis Seifert =

American professor (born 1962)

- Born: February 1, 1962 (age 64)

Academic background
- Education: Paris III; University of Michigan

Lewis Carl Seifert (born February 1, 1962) is a professor of French Literature at Brown University in Providence, Rhode Island.

Seifert holds a DEA from the Université de Paris III (1986) and a PhD from the Department of Romance Languages at the University of Michigan (1989).

He is the author of two books; Fairy tales, sexuality, and gender in France, 1690-1715 : nostalgic utopias (Cambridge UP, 1996) and Manning the Margins: Masculinity and Writing in Seventeenth-Century France (University of Michigan Press, 2009), and articles such as "Marvelous in Context: The Place of the Contes de Fées in Late Seventeenth Century France".
