= Alice-Miranda =

Children's book series

- Alice-Miranda At School (2010); Alice-Miranda On Holiday (2010); Alice-Miranda Takes The Lead (2011); Alice-Miranda At Sea (2011); Alice-Miranda In New York (2012); Alice-Miranda Shows The Way (2012); Alice-Miranda in Paris (2013); Alice-Miranda Shines Bright (2013); Alice-Miranda in Japan (2014); Alice-Miranda at Camp (2014); Alice-Miranda at the Palace (2015); Alice-Miranda in the Alps (2015); Alice-Miranda to the Rescue (2016); Alice-Miranda in China (2016); Alice-Miranda Holds the Key (2017); Alice-Miranda in Hollywood (2017); Alice-Miranda in Scotland (2018); Alice-Miranda Keeps the Beat (2019); Alice-Miranda in the Outback (2020); Alice-Miranda in Egypt (2021)
- Author: Jacqueline Harvey
- Country: Australia
- Language: English
- Genre: Children's literature
- Publisher: Random House (Australia)
- Published: 2010 – present (initial publication)
- Media type: Print (paperback)
- No. of books: 20

Alice-Miranda is a series of children's novels written by Australian author Jacqueline Harvey. The novels chronicle the adventures of a young student at the Winchesterfield-Downsfordvale Academy for Proper Young Ladies. Alice-Miranda At School is the first book in the series and was published in 2010. The series was created by Australian author Jacqueline Harvey, a teacher and former Deputy Head of Junior School and Director of Development at Abbotsleigh. Harvey created the Alice-Miranda series based on her teaching experiences at boarding schools. The series is sold throughout Australia, United States, United Kingdom, Indonesia, Turkey, Hungary and Brazil.

== Plot ==
Alice-Miranda began attending the Winchesterfield-Downsfordvale Academy for Proper Young Ladies with her friend Millie at the age of seven and one quarter when she takes on challenges such as Headmistress Ophelia Grimm, a mysterious stranger, and Alethea Goldsworthy who along with her three marionettes taunt Alice-Miranda and her friends. Now Alice-Miranda will have to face a five-day camp alone in the forest, take on a massive test and head to head the Head Prefect (Alethea Goldsworthy) in a solo sailing regatta race or else have to leave the school and never return. Will she be able to make it through this impossible challenge and stay at school

The series continues to follow Alice-Miranda as she attends school with her friends and travels around the world.

== Books ==
=== Main series ===
1. Alice-Miranda At School (2010)
2. Alice-Miranda On Holiday (2010)
3. Alice-Miranda Takes The Lead (2011)
4. Alice-Miranda At Sea (2011)
5. Alice-Miranda In New York (2012)
6. Alice-Miranda Shows The Way (2012)
7. Alice-Miranda in Paris (2013)
8. Alice-Miranda Shines Bright (2013)
9. Alice-Miranda in Japan (2014)
10. Alice-Miranda at Camp (2014)
11. Alice-Miranda at the Palace (2015)
12. Alice-Miranda in the Alps (2015)
13. Alice-Miranda to the Rescue (2016)
14. Alice-Miranda in China (2016)
15. Alice-Miranda Holds the Key (2017)
16. Alice-Miranda in Hollywood (2017)
17. Alice-Miranda in Scotland (2018)
18. Alice-Miranda Keeps the Beat (2019)
19. Alice-Miranda in the Outback (2020)
20. Alice-Miranda in Egypt (2021)
21. Alice-Miranda and the Christmas Mystery (2023)

=== Movie tie-ins ===
1. Alice-Miranda Friends Forever: The Official Movie Script (2019)
2. Alice-Miranda: A Royal Christmas Ball: The Official Movie Script (2021)

== Reception ==
In 2012, Alice-Miranda At School received the Young Australians Best Book Award (YABBA). Alice-Miranda in Paris was listed as a KOALA Honour book in the Fiction for Young Readers category in 2014. The book was also included on the shortlist for "Book of the Year for Older Children" at the 14th Australian Book Industry Awards (ABIAs) in 2014.

Random House Australia's "Top 10 Children's Bestselling Books of 2014" list included Alice-Miranda At Camp, Alice-Miranda In Japan, and Alice-Miranda At School. Alice-Miranda to the Rescue was listed on the 2015 Better Reading's "Weekly Top 10 Children's Bestseller" list, and Alice-Miranda in Japan was included on the ABIAs shortlist for Book of the Year for Older Children in 2015.

== Adaptations ==
=== Telemovies ===
==== Alice-Miranda Friends Forever ====
In June 2016, the Nine Network commissioned a 26-episode animated series based on the novels, to be co-produced by SLR Productions and ZDF Enterprises. Two years later, it was revealed that the project had evolved into an 80-minute animated telemovie, which was beginning production under the name of Alice-Miranda Shines Bright, in association with Screen Australia. In 2019, the movie's title was announced as Alice-Miranda Friends Forever, expected to premiere on 9Go! later in the year. The film was released exclusively by Event Cinemas for a limited run beginning 9 November 2019, and premiered on streaming service Stan on 2 December 2019. The film also premiered on 9Go! on 28 December 2019.

==== Alice-Miranda: A Royal Christmas Ball ====
In October 2019, SLR Productions and the Nine Network ordered a second 80-minute animated telemovie, titled Alice-Miranda: A Royal Christmas Ball. The telemovie debuted on Stan on 15 October 2021 and screened on 9Go! in December.
