= Marie-Jeanne L'Héritier =

Marie-Jeanne L'Héritier de Villandon
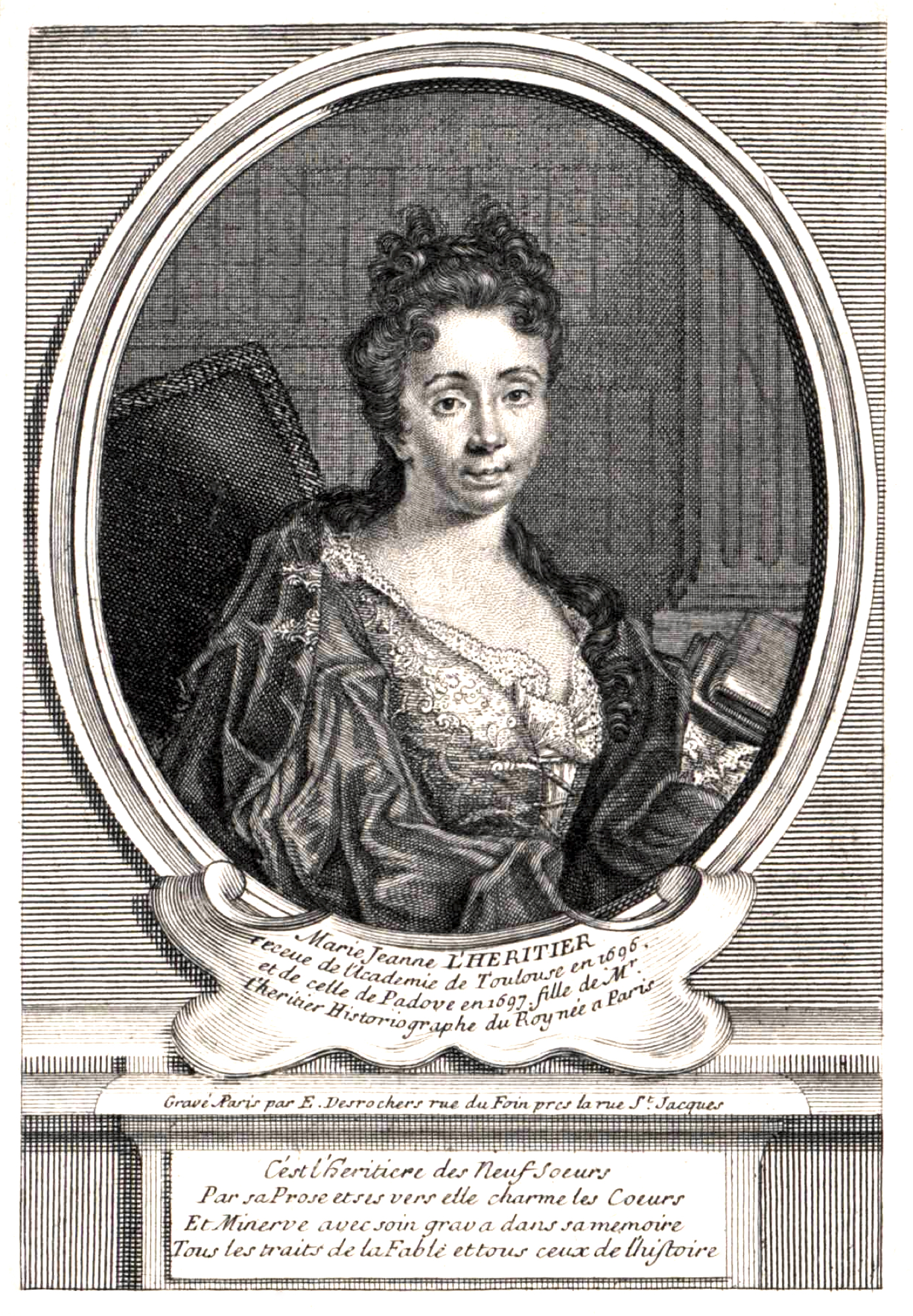
- Born: 12 November 1664
- Died: 24 February 1734 (aged 69)
- Occupation: Author
- Genre: Fantasy

Marie-Jeanne L'Héritier de Villandon (12 November 1664 – 24 February 1734) was an aristocratic French writer and salonnière of the late 17th century, and a niece of Charles Perrault.

In the 1690s, she published three fairy tales, and is credited with the beginning of the fairy tale vogue among the Précieuses. Her work on fairy tales preceded that of her uncle by a year. Like several other women writers of her era, she was a member of les conteuses.

== Biography ==
She published three fairy tales early in her career. Although she wrote few thereafter, she marked the beginning of the fairy tale vogue among the Précieuses, publishing her first tale a year before her uncle, the famed author of Les Contes de ma Mère l’Oye (Tales of Mother Goose) in 1696. A great friend and protégé of Madeleine de Scudéry, L'Héritier's participation in the fairy tale genre reflected her involvement in the salon scene, as she and so many of her friends and fellow salonnières, such as Madame d'Aulnoy and Henriette-Julie de Murat, were members of les conteuses. These women were monumental in the inception of the fairy tale genre, along with her esteemed uncle. She inherited Scudéry's salon upon her death in 1701.

== Works ==
=== Fairy tales ===
- L'Adroite princesse, ou, Les aventures de Finette - as above.
- Marmoisan - a literary tale classified in the Aarne-Thompson-Uther Index as ATU 884A, "The Forsaken Fiancée: Service as Menial".
- Ricdin-Ricdon - a literary predecessor to tale type ATU 500, "The Name of the Helper", akin to Rumplestiltskin.
