= Catherine Bernard =

French poet, novelist, and playwright

Catherine Bernard (24 August 1663, in Rouen – 6 September 1712, in Paris) was a French poet, novelist, and playwright born into a Huguenot family. She was the first woman to compose a tragedy performed at the Comédie-Française, between 1687 and 1700. During that same period, she won the poetry prize of the Académie des Jeux Florals de Toulouse three times (1696, 1697, 1698).

== Biography ==
Born into a Protestant family, she moved to Paris before the age of seventeen. It has been claimed, notably by Voltaire in the context of the plagiarism of his work and without any proof, that she was close to the writer Fontenelle and the playwright Jacques Pradon. She published her first novel in 1680. She converted to Catholicism before 1685, the date of the Edict of Fontainebleau. This was also the date of her break with her Protestant family. From then on, Catherine Bernard lived from her pen, devoting herself entirely to writing. She wrote two tragedies, Laodamie and Brutus, which were performed at the Comédie-Française in 1689 and 1691, representing the best theatrical successes of the end of the century.

She was crowned by the Académie Française in 1691, 1693 and 1697, and won three prizes at the Jeux Floraux de Toulouse. From 1691, King Louis XIV paid her an annual pension of 200 écus. She frequented the salon of Marie-Jeanne L'Héritier, niece of Charles Perrault. With Riquet à la houppe and Le Prince rosier, she was one of the first to create fairy tales, contributing to the renewal of this literary genre. In 1699, she became a member of the Accademia Galileiana in Padua, under the name of Calliope, l'Invincible. She then stopped writing for the theater, no doubt at the request of Madame de Pontchartrain, her patron of the arts. She abandoned all public activity. However, she continued to write verse, which she did not publish.

She died in poverty in 1712. According to her will, she bequeathed her property to her servant.
