= List of fairytale fantasies =

This list of fairytale fantasies contains an illustrative list of fairytale fantasy works.

== Original Fairytale Works ==
- Friedrich de la Motte Fouqué's Undine (1811)
- E. T. A. Hoffmann's The Nutcracker and the Mouseking (1816)
- George MacDonald's Phantastes (1858)
- Lewis Carroll's Alice's Adventures in Wonderland (1865)
- Lewis Carroll's Through the Looking-Glass (1871)
- George MacDonald's At the Back of the North Wind (1871)
- George MacDonald's The Princess and the Goblin (1872)
- Carlo Collodi's The Adventures of Pinocchio (1883)
- L. Frank Baum's The Wonderful Wizard of Oz (1900)
- J. M. Barrie's Peter Pan (1904: play) (1911: novel)
- Lord Dunsany's The King of Elfland's Daughter (1924)
- Lord Dunsany's The Charwoman's Shadow (1926)
- James Thurber's Many Moons (1944)
- James Thurber's The 13 Clocks (1950)
- Jay Williams's The Practical Princess and other Liberating Fairy Tales (1979)
- M. M. Kaye's The Ordinary Princess (1980)
- Judy Corbalis's The Wrestling Princess and other stories (1986)
- Susan Price's The Ghost Drum (1987)
- Neil Gaiman's Stardust (1999)
- Clare B. Dunkle's The Hollow Kingdom (2003)

== Retellings ==
=== Beauty and the Beast ===
- Robin McKinley's Beauty: A Retelling of the Story of Beauty and the Beast (1978)
- Angela Carter's "The Courtship of Mr Lyon" and "The Tiger's Bride" in The Bloody Chamber (1979)
- Robin McKinley's Rose Daughter (1997)
- Donna Jo Napoli's Beast (2000)
- Alex Flinn's Beastly (2007)
- Cameron Dokey's Belle (2008)
- Juliet Marillier's Heart's Blood (2009)
- Rosamund Hodge's Cruel Beauty (2014)
- Naomi Novik's Uprooted (2015)
- Sarah J. Maas's A Court of Thorns and Roses (2015)
- Brigid Kemmerer's A Curse So Dark and Lonely (2019)

=== Rapunzel ===
- Nicholas Stuart Gray's The Stone Cage (1963)
- Adele Geras's The Tower Room (1990) (Book 1 in the Egerton Hall Trilogy)
- Donna Jo Napoli's Zel (1996)
- Cameron Dokey's Golden (2006)
- Kate Forsyth's Bitter Greens (2012)
- Marissa Meyer's Cress (2014), third book in the Lunar Chronicles

=== The Little Mermaid ===
- Osamu Tezuka's Angel's Hill (1960)
- Rosa Guy's My Love, My Love, or the Peasant Girl (1985)
- Alice Hoffman's Aquamarine (2001)
- Debbie Viguié's Midnight Pearls (2003)
- Jim C. Hines's The Mermaid's Madness (2009)
- LeAnn Neal Reilly's The Mermaid's Pendant (2010)
- Carolyn Turgeon's Mermaid: A Twist on the Classic Tale (2011)
- Jackson Pearce's Fathomless (2012)
- L.A. Witt's Ripples and Waves: A Queer Retelling of Hans Christian Andersen's The Little Mermaid (2019)
- Natasha Bowen's Skin of the Sea (2021)

=== Sleeping Beauty ===
- Anne Rice’s The Sleeping Beauty Quartet (1983-2015)
- Adele Geras's Watching the Roses (1991) (Book 2 in the Egerton Hall Trilogy)
- Jane Yolen's Briar Rose (1992)
- Martha Wells' "Thorns" (Realms of Fantasy, 1995)
- Robert Coover's Briar Rose (1996)
- Orson Scott Card's Enchantment (1999)
- Sophie Masson's Clementine (1999)
- Robin McKinley's Spindle's End (2000)
- Diane Zahler's Sleeping Beauty’s Daughters (2013)
- Cindy Pham's The Secret World of Briar Rose (2026)

=== Rumpelstiltskin ===
- Eleanor Farjeon's The Silver Curlew (play, 1949; novel, 1953)
- Elizabeth C. Bunce's A Curse Dark as Gold (2008)
- Liesl Shurtliff's Rump: The (Fairly) True Tale of Rumpelstiltskin (2014)
- Naomi Novik's Spinning Silver (2018)

=== The Wild Swans ===
- Nicholas Stuart Gray's The Seventh Swan (1962), about the brother left with a swan's wing for an arm
- Peg Kerr's The Wild Swans (1999)
- Juliet Marillier's Daughter of the Forest (2000)
- Diane Zahler's Princess of the Wild Swans (2012)

=== Snow White ===
- Adele Geras's Pictures of the Night (1992) (Book 3 in the Egerton Hall Trilogy)
- Tanith Lee's White as Snow, a dark retelling (2000)
- Gregory Maguire's Mirror, Mirror (2003)
- Gail Carson Levine's Fairest (2006)
- Jane Yolen's Snow in Summer: Fairest of Them All, a retelling set in early twentieth-century Appalachia (2011)
- Marissa Meyer's Fairest (2015), book in the Lunar Chronicles
- Marissa Meyer's Winter (2015), fourth book in the Lunar Chronicles

=== Pied Piper of Hamelin ===
- Delia Huddy's Time Piper (1984)
- Jane Lindskold's The Pipes of Orpheus (1995)
- Terry Pratchett's The Amazing Maurice and his Educated Rodents (2001)
- Adam McCune & Keith McCune's The Rats of Hamelin (2005)
- Meg Harper's Piper (2007)

=== Cinderella ===
- Eleanor Farjeon's The Glass Slipper (play, 1944; novelization, 1955)
- Gail Carson Levine's Ella Enchanted (1997)
- Gregory Maguire's Confessions of an Ugly Stepsister (1999)
- Margaret Peterson Haddix's Just Ella (1999)
- Diane Stanley's Bella at Midnight (2006)
- Jessica Day George's Princess of Glass (2010)
- Marissa Meyer's Cinder (2012), first book in the Lunar Chronicles
- Mercedes Lackey's The Fairy Godmother: The First Five Hundred Kingdoms Novel of Magic and Romance (2016)
- Kalynn Bayron's Cinderella is Dead (2020)

=== The Twelve Dancing Princesses ===
- Juliet Marillier's Wildwood Dancing (2008) also based on The Frog Prince
- Suzanne Weyn's The Night Dance (2008)
- Jessica Day George's Princess of the Midnight Ball (2009)
- Heather Dixon's Entwined (2011)

=== The Snow Queen ===
- Joan Vinge's The Snow Queen (1980) using elements of the Hans Christian Andersen fairy tale
- Eileen Kernaghan's The Snow Queen (2000) combining Andersen's Snow Queen and the Kalevala

=== Other tales ===
- Katharine Mary Briggs's Kate Crackernuts (1963) based on the Scottish fairy tale "Kate Crackernuts"
- James Reeves's The Cold Flame (1967), a retelling of the Grimm tale "The Blue Light"
- Kara Dalkey's The Nightingale (1988), based on "The Emperor and the Nightingale"
- Patricia Wrede's Snow White and Rose Red (1989) based on the Grimm Brothers' tale of the same title, which is not "Snow White"
- Ellen Kushner's Thomas the Rhymer (1990) based on the Scottish ballad of the same title
- Robin McKinley's Deerskin (1994) a retelling of Charles Perrault's "Donkeyskin"
- Gregory Maguire's Wicked: The Life and Times of the Wicked Witch of the West (1995) a parallel novel of The Wizard of Oz based upon the writings of L. Frank Baum
- Sophie Masson's Carabas (US title Serafin) (1996) based on "Puss in Boots"
- Gregory Frost's Fitcher's Brides (2002) a retelling of the "Bluebeard" / "Fitcher's Bird" fairy tale
- Louise Murphy's The True Story of Hansel and Gretel (2003)
- Edith Pattou's East (2003) based on "East of the Sun and West of the Moon"
- Shannon Hale's The Goose Girl (2003) based on "The Goose Girl" tale collected by the Grimm Brothers
- Kathryn Davis's The Girl Who Trod on a Loaf (2003) a contemporary American treatment of the Hans Andersen story
- Jackson Pearce's Sisters Red (2010), based on "Little Red Riding Hood"; Sweetly (2011), based on "Hansel and Gretel"; and Fathomless (2012), a retelling of "The Little Mermaid".
- Diane Zahler's A True Princess (2010), based on Hans Christian Andersen's "The Princess and the Pea"
- Jessica Day George's Sun and Moon, Ice and Snow (2011), based on "East of the Sun and West of the Moon"
- Marissa Meyer's Scarlet (2013), based on "Little Red Riding Hood", second book in Lunar Chronicles series
- Danielle Paige's Dorothy Must Die (2014), based on the The Wizard of Oz

== Multiple ==
- Angela Carter's The Bloody Chamber (1979) (stories)
- Robin McKinley's The Door in the Hedge (1981)
- Tanith Lee's Red as Blood, or Tales from the Sisters Grimmer (1983) a collection of short stories, all fairytale fantasies, many of them revisionist
- Pedro Bandeira's O Fantástico Mistério de Feiurinha (1986), draws on multiple fairy tales
- Francesca Lia Block's The Rose and the Beast (1993) (stories)
- Emma Donoghue's Kissing the Witch (1993) (stories)
- Ellen Datlow and Terri Windling's Snow White, Blood Red (1993), Black Thorn, White Rose (1994), and Ruby Slippers, Golden Tears (1995)
- Berlie Doherty's The Vinegar Jar (1994) draws on several tales from Grimm
- Cornelia Funke's Reckless (2010) draws on several of Grimm's Fairy Tales
- Katie Farris's boysgirls (2011), short stories which include retellings
- Christopher Healy's The Hero's Guide to Saving Your Kingdom series (2012 – 2014), based on several Grim's fairy tales
- Katherine Arden's Winternight trilogy (2017–2019), based on Russian folklore

== See also ==
- List of fairy tales, linking to various individual fairy tales' pages, several of which list fairytale fantasies among their variants
- Once Upon a Time, a series of novels by various authors, mainly new retellings of fairy tales
