= Mulan Joins the Army =

Mulan Joins the Army may refer to:

- Mulan Joins the Army (play)
- Mulan Joins the Army (1928 film)
- Mulan Joins the Army (1939 film)
- Hua Mulan Joins the Army, a 1927 film by Tianyi Film Company about Hua Mulan

== See also ==
- Hua Mulan (disambiguation)
- Mulan (disambiguation)
