= Hua Mulan (disambiguation) =

Hua Mulan is a legendary Chinese heroine.

Hua Mulan may also refer to:

- Lady General Hua Mu-lan, a 1964 Hong Kong film
- Mulan, a 2009 Chinese film
- Hua Mulan (1996 TV series), a 1996–1997 Chinese TV series
- A Tough Side of a Lady, a 1998 Hong Kong TV series
- Hua Mulan (1999 TV series), a 1999 Taiwanese TV series
- Hua Mulan (2011 TV series), a 2011 Chinese TV series

== See also ==
- Mulan Joins the Army (disambiguation)
- Mulan (disambiguation)
