= Mulan (disambiguation) =

Mulan or Hua Mulan is a legendary figure from ancient China said to have taken her father's place in the army.

Mulan may also refer to:

== Entertainment ==
- Mulan (2009 film), a 2009 film starring Vicky Zhao and Chen Kun
- Lady General Hua Mu-lan, a 1964 film

=== Disney Princess media franchise ===
- Mulan (franchise), a Disney media franchise
  - Mulan (1998 film), a 1998 Disney animated film based on the legendary figure Hua Mulan
  - Mulan (video game), 1998 Game Boy game, made by THQ studio NewKidCo, based on the first film
  - Disney's Animated Storybook: Mulan, a 1998 video game for Windows and Macintosh computers developed by Media Station and published by Disney Interactive, ported to PlayStation the following year by Revolution Software as Disney's Story Studio: Mulan
  - Mulan Jr., a one-stage musical
  - Mulan II, a 2004 Disney direct-to-video sequel to Mulan
  - Mulan (2020 film), a live-action remake of Mulan

==== Soundtracks ====
- Mulan (1998 soundtrack), a 1998 soundtrack to the Disney animated film
- Mulan (2020 soundtrack), a 2020 soundtrack to the Disney film live-action remake

=== Fictional characters ===
- Mulan (Disney character), the title character of the Disney 1998 film and associated media
- Mulan, a recurring character in the television series Once Upon a Time
- Yao Mulan, the female protagonist in Lin Yutang's novel Moment in Peking

== Plants ==
- Magnolia liliiflora, Mulan magnolia

== People ==
- Ruth Mulan Chu Chao (born Zhu Mulan)
- Huang Mulan
- Mulan Jameela

== Places ==
- Mulan, Iran, a village in East Azerbaijan Province, Iran
- Mulan Rural District, in East Azerbaijan Province, Iran
- Mulan County, Heilongjiang, China
- Mulan, Huangpi, township in Huangpi District, Wuhan, China
- Mulan River, in Fujian, China
- Mulan Community, Western Australia

== Other uses ==
- MG Mulan, an electric car
- Tropical Storm Mulan, a 2022 Pacific typhoon

== See also ==
- Hua Mulan (disambiguation)
- Mulan Joins the Army (disambiguation)
