= Tale Spinners for Children =

Series of recordings

- Parent company: United Artists
- Founded: 1959
- Founder: Max E. Youngstein
- Distributor: United Artists Records (America)
- Country of origin: GB

Tale Spinners for Children was a series of stories and novels adapted for young audiences on vinyl records in the early 1960s. They included a collection of old fairy tales, folklore, literary classics such as Don Quixote and Robinson Crusoe, and time-honored fables, with the title role sometimes played by a renowned theatrical actor or actress. (Many of the actors who appeared, however, such as Maggie Smith or Alec McCowen, became more famous for other roles years after the albums were released), The series gave children an exposure to timeless classic stories.

Originally only 30 records were pressed in England and France and sold as Atlas Talespinners under the Atlas Record label, and included an easy to follow story booklet. Within a few years, these records were introduced to the U.S. as Tale Spinners for Children under the United Artists Records label. What was known as the Atlas Theatre Company in England was marketed as the Famous Theatre Company in the United States. The story booklets were not included in the U.S. releases.

UA continued to produce more stories records until the early 1970s, and distribute them in the Canadian and Australian markets as well.

With popular children's record companies like Walt Disney Records already on the market, a host of other record companies followed: Mercury Storyteller series, Telegeneral Let's Pretend, Riverside Wonderland and Pathways of Sound.

The Nutcracker Suite UAC11011 dated 1962.

== Selected discography ==
=== United Artists Series ===
- Robin Hood - Robert Hardy UAC 11001
- William Tell - Paul Daneman UAC 11002
- Snow White - Marjorie Westbury UAC 11003
- Cinderella - Marjorie Westbury UAC 11004
- The Knights of the Round Table - Derek Hart UAC 11005
- Sleeping Beauty - Denise Bryer UAC 11006
- The Three Musketeers - Robert Hardy UAC 11007
- The Ugly Duckling - Denise Bryer UAC 11008
- Puss in Boots UAC 11009
- The Story of Chopin - Robert Hardy UAC 11010
- The Nutcracker Suite - Denise Bryer UAC 11011
- Little Red Riding Hood - Judith Stott UAC 11012
- Treasure Island - James Kennedy UAC 11013
- Pinocchio - Maggie Smith UAC 11014
- Robinson Crusoe - Alec McCowen UAC 11015
- Nursery Rhymes - UAC 11016
- The Pied Piper & The Tinder Box - Denise Bryer UAC 11017
- Ali Baba and the 40 Thieves - Denise Bryer UAC 11018
- Aladdin and the Magic Lamp - Denise Bryer UAC 11019
- Sinbad the Sailor - Derek Hart UAC 11020
- The Emperor's New Clothes & Hop-o'-My-Thumb - Frank Luther (Englishman, not the popular American narrator) UAC 11021
- The Story of Mozart - Alec McCowen UAC 11022
- The Story of Beethoven - William Devlin UAC 11023
- Gulliver in Lilliput - Derek Hart UAC 11024
- Don Quixote - Donald Pleasence UAC 11025
- The Story of the Old Testament, Part One - James McKenchie and John Wood UAC 11026
- Gilbert and Sullivan's The Mikado - Frank Luther (Englishman, not the popular American narrator) UAC 11027 with The New Modern Music Theatre Company
- Bluebeard - Marjorie Westbury UAC 11028
- Alice in Wonderland - Denise Bryer UAC 11029
- Davy Crockett - Denise Bryer UAC 11030
- The Story of the Old Testament, Part Two - James McKechnie and John Wood UAC 11031
- Sing Along with Chipper and His Playmates - Henry LaPedus - UAC 11032
- Hansel and Gretel - UAC 11033
- Rip Van Winkle - UAC 11034
- Row, Row, Row Your Boat and Other Mother Goose Rhymes - UAC 11035
- Little Toot and Other Sea Songs - UAC 11036
- The Little Engine That Could & Jack and the Beanstalk - UAC 11037
- Thumbelina - John Scott, Ellen Hayes, Margo Shea, Bob Brown, The Ace Singers / Arthur Korb, John Stratter - UAC 11038
- Peter and the Wolf - UAC 11039
- Christopher Columbus - James McKechnie UAC 11040
- Mother Goose UAC 11041 Barrie Peter and John Thomas with the Hickory Dickory Singers and Orch. (High Fidelity)
- The Little Mermaid Denise Bryer UAC 11042
- Happy Birthday Party Time UAC 11043 Jack Johnson and the Hickory Dickory Players

Sunset Record Logo used from 1966 to 1970.

- The Count of Monte Cristo - Paul Daneman UAC 11044
- Beauty and the Beast UAC 11045
- Baron Munchausen William Devlin UAC 11046
- Brave Little Tailor - Donald Pleasence UAC 11047
- The Story of Bach Derek Hart UAC 11048
- Sing Along With Humpty Dumpty UAC 11049 The Penguins and Orchestra
- God Bless Us All - John Chapman UAC 11050
- Golden Rhymes - Winnie Barrie UAC 11051 Hickery Dickery Players
- Western TV Favorites - Rex Hickock and His Rangers UAC 11052
- Peter Pan - Frank Gauna UAC 11053
- Hiawatha Jordan Malek UAC 11054
- Goldilocks and the Three Bears & The Three Little Pigs UAC 11055
- Wizard of Oz UAC 11056
- Daniel Boone UAC 11057
- The Silver Skates UAC 11058
- Swiss Family Robinson UAC 11059
- The Prince and the Pauper UAC 11060
- The Snow Queen UAC 11061
- Tom Thumb UAC 11062
- The Red Shoes UAC 11063
- Heidi UAC 11064
- King Midas & Rumpelstilskin UAC 11065
- Jack and the Beanstalk - The Regency Players UAC 11067
- Aesop's Best Known Fables - The Regency Players UAC 11068 (1969)
- Favorite Stories from Grimm's Fairy Tales - The Regency Players UAC 11069 (1969)
- Alphabet and Numbers UAC 11070
- Ring Around a Rosy UAC 110'] UAC 11072 Sunset
- Snow-White and Rose-Red & The Goose Girl - Herb Galewitz UAC 11073 Sunset
- The Gingerbread Man - The Regency Players UAC 11074 Sunset
- Tales from the Arabian Nights - The Regency Players UAC 11075 Sunset
- The Frog Princess - The Regency Players UAC 11076 Sunset
- Rudyard Kipling's Just So Stories - The Regency Players UAC 11077 Sunset
- The Owl and the Pussycat - Miss Kari UAC 11078 Sunset
- Funny Fairy Tales - The Regency Players UAC 11079 Sunset
- The Very Best Stories About Princesses UAC 11080 Sunset
- Macaroni the Little Pony - Frank Luther UAK 61

=== Atlas Talespinner Series ===
- Robin Hood - Robert Hardy EN 10-001
- The 3 Musketeers - Robert Hardy and The Atlas Theatre Company EN 10-002
- The Story of Bach EN 10-003
- The Little Mermaid - Denise Bryer and The Atlas Theatre Company EN 10-004 Atlas
- Gulliver in Lilliput - Derek Hart and The Atlas Theatre Company EN 10-005
- The Story of the Old Testament, Part One - James McKechnie and The Atlas Theatre Company EN 10-006
- The Story of the Old Testament, Part Two - James McKechnie and The Atlas Theatre Company EN 10-007
- Cinderella - Marjorie Westbury and The Atlas Theatre Company EN 10-008
- The Nutcracker Suite - Denise Bryer and The Atlas Theatre Company EN 10-009
- Christopher Columbus - James McKechnie and The Atlas Theatre Company EN 10-010
- The Knights of the Round Table - Derek Hart and The Atlas Theatre Company EN 10-011
- The Ugly Duckling - Denise Bryer and The Atlas Theatre Company EN 10-012
- Don Quixote - Donald Pleasence and The Atlas Theatre Company EN 10-013
- Puss in Boots - Cyril Shaps and The Atlas Theatre Company EN 10-014
- Treasure Island - James Kenney EN 10-015
- Beauty and the Beast - Cyril Shaps and The Atlas Theatre Company EN 10-016
- Bluebeard - Marjorie Westbury EN 10-017
- Brave Little Tailor - Donald Pleasence and The Atlas Theatre Company EN 10-018
- Sleeping Beauty - Denise Bryer EN 10-019
- Snow White - Marjorie Westbury and The Atlas Theatre Company EN 10-020
- Pinocchio - Maggie Smith EN 10-021
- William Tell - Paul Daneman EN 10-022
- The Adventures of Baron Munchhausen - William Devlin and the Atlas Theatre Company EN 10-023
- The Story of Chopin - Robert Hardy EN 10-024
- The Count of Monte Cristo - Paul Daneman and The Atlas Theatre Company EN 10-025
- The Story of Mozart - Alec McCowen EN 10-026
- Little Red Riding Hood - Judith Stott EN 10-027
- The Story of Beethoven - William Devlin EN 10-028
- Robinson Crusoe - William Devlin and the Atlas Theatre Company EN 10-029
- Nursery Rhymes EN 10-030

== History ==
United Artists released the 30 original stories in the US in 1962. The recording labels changed when Liberty Records (its budget subsidiary Sunset Records) and United Artists Records merged in 1968 after Transamerica bought Liberty. All labels were merged under United Artists in 1971. When Liberty was deactivated in 1971 (for the first time) both the Sunset and Talespinners series were leased by Springboard International and in the case of the Talespinners series they used the same catalog numbers until 1975. When Springboard International Records went bankrupt 1984 Gusto Records acquired some of their catalogues from Jay-Koala.

== Music ==
Tale Spinners for Children used classical music as background and linking music in their productions. Examples of this include:

- Robin Hood (UAC 11001) - Violin Concerto in E minor by Felix Mendelssohn
- William Tell (UAC 11002) - William Tell Overture and Overture from La Gazza Ladra by Gioachino Rossini
- The Three Musketeers (UAC 11007) - "The Dance of the Furies" from Orfeo ed Euridice by Christoph Gluck
- Treasure Island (UAC 11013) - Symphonie fantastique by Hector Berlioz (also used in "Hiawatha" [UAC 11054])
- Sinbad the Sailor (UAC 11020) - Scheherazade by Nikolai Rimsky-Korsakov (also used in "Ali Baba and the Forty Thieves" [UAC 11018] and "Aladdin and the Magic Lamp" [UAC 11019])
- Rip Van Winkle (UAC 11034) - Overture for A Midsummer Night's Dream by Felix Mendelssohn
- Christopher Columbus (UAC 11040) - Symphony No. 9 - "From the New World" by Antonín Dvořák
- The Little Mermaid (UAC 11042) - Piano Concerto in A minor by Edvard Grieg
- The Count of Monte Cristo (UAC 11044) - Symphony No. 6 by Pyotr Ilyich Tchaikovsky
- Robinson Crusoe (UAC 11015) - Symphony No. 5 by Pyotr Ilyich Tchaikovsky

== See also ==
- List of fairytale fantasies—for modern retellings
- Storytelling
