= The Storybook Series with Hayley Mills =

1986 American animated series

- Also known as: Grimm's Fairy Tales and Storybook Series
- Directed by: Sam Weiss
- Presented by: Hayley Mills
- Voices of: Mickey Rooney; Georgia Engel; Louis Nye; Michael York; Arte Johnson; James Earl Jones; Ruth Buzzi; John Carradine; Hans Conried; Tammy Grimes; June Foray; Lucille Bliss
- Country of origin: United States
- Original language: English

Production
- Running time: 30-60 minutes
- Production company: Bosustow Entertainment

Original release
- Release: 1986

The Storybook Series with Hayley Mills (also known as Grimm's Fairy Tales and Storybook Series) is a 1986 American animated anthology television/video series hosted by Hayley Mills, who would introduce stories that were both contemporary and classic.

This series featured the voice talents of the Mickey Rooney, Georgia Engel, Louis Nye, Michael York, Arte Johnson, James Earl Jones, Ruth Buzzi, John Carradine, Hans Conried, Tammy Grimes, June Foray and Lucille Bliss.

The complete series was released on DVD through Mill Creek Entertainment on January 17, 2017.

== Episodes ==
1. Hug Me / Silver Pony / Creole
2. Hardlucky / The Furious Flycycle
3. Someone New / Ghost in the Shed / The Reluctant Dragon
4. The Practical Princess / Beauty and the Beast
5. The Fisherman and His Wife / Tom Thumb
6. Seven with One Blow / The Youth Who Wanted to Shiver
7. Three Golden Hairs / Hans in Luck
8. I'm Not Oscar's Friend Anymore / Myra / Martha and the Mother Store / The Man Who Had No Dream
9. The Legend of Paul Bunyan / The Wave
10. The Legend of Sleepy Hollow / Just Say Hic
11. The Beginning / Who Do You Think Should Belong in the Club?
12. Good Goodies / Noises in the Night / All the Morning Early
13. Birds of a Feather / Modern Life / My Mother is the Most Beautiful Woman in the World

== Cast ==
- Hayley Mills as Herself / Host
- Georgia Engel as Creole
- Arte Johnson as the Alligator
- Mickey Rooney
- Claire Bloom as Beauty
- Michael York as Beast
- Hans Conried as the Fisherman
- June Foray as the Fisherman's Wife
- Tammy Grimes as the Practical Princess
