= Once Upon a Time (novel series) =

Series of novels

Once Upon a Time is a series of novels published by Simon Pulse, an imprint of Simon & Schuster. The Once Upon A Time novels are usually new retellings of fairy tales featuring a teenaged heroine. Some of the recurring themes and subjects in the books are romance, magic, fantasy, intrigue, finding true love, and good conquering over evil in the end.

== Series ==
- The Storyteller's Daughter (ISBN 0-743-42220-1) by Cameron Dokey (A retelling of The Arabian Nights, published September 2002)
- Beauty Sleep by Cameron Dokey (A retelling of "Sleeping Beauty", published December 2002)
- Snow by Tracy Lynn (A retelling of "Snow White", published February 2003)
- Midnight Pearls by Debbie Viguié (A retelling of "The Little Mermaid", published June 2003)
- Scarlet Moon by Debbie Viguié (A retelling of "Little Red Riding Hood", published April 2004)
- Sunlight and Shadow by Cameron Dokey (A retelling of The Magic Flute, published July 2004)
- Spirited by Nancy Holder (A retelling of The Last of the Mohicans and "Beauty and the Beast", published November 2004)
- The Night Dance by Suzanne Weyn (A retelling of "The Twelve Dancing Princesses", published November 2005)
- Golden by Cameron Dokey (A retelling of "Rapunzel", published February 2006)
- Water Song by Suzanne Weyn (A retelling of "The Frog Prince", published October 2006)
- Before Midnight by Cameron Dokey (A retelling of "Cinderella", published March 2007)
- The Rose Bride by Nancy Holder (A retelling of "The White and the Black Bride", published June 2007)
- The Crimson Thread by Suzanne Weyn (A retelling of "Rumpelstiltskin", published June 2008)
- Belle by Cameron Dokey (A retelling of "Beauty and the Beast", published November 2008)
- Wild Orchid by Cameron Dokey (A retelling of the "Ballad of Mulan", published February, 2009)
- The Diamond Secret by Suzanne Weyn (A retelling of Anastasia, published June 2, 2009)
- Winter's Child by Cameron Dokey (A retelling of "The Snow Queen", published September 8, 2009)
- Violet Eyes by Debbie Viguié (A retelling of "The Princess and the Pea", published February 23, 2010)
- The World Above by Cameron Dokey (A retelling of "Jack and the Beanstalk" and Robin Hood, published June 8, 2010)
- Once. An omnibus edition featuring three of Cameron Dokey's novels: Before Midnight, Golden, and Wild Orchid.
- Kissed. An omnibus edition featuring three of Cameron Dokey's novels: Belle, Sunlight and Shadow, and Winter's Child.
