= Derek Hart =

British broadcaster (1925–1986)

Derek Osborne Hart (18 March 1925 – 23 November 1986) was a British actor, journalist, and radio presenter best known for his appearances on the BBC's current affairs programme of the 1950s and 1960s, Tonight.

Hart was born in Hertfordshire and educated in Bath, Somerset. As an interviewer, Hart's subjects included Lon Chaney Jr and John Wyndham. In 1969 he interviewed Christopher Isherwood for the Omnibus documentary series.

In 1968 he hosted a series of arts programmes, Tempo, in the course of which he interviewed major theatrical figures such as Michael Hordern and Sybil Thorndike. He also narrated documentaries on subjects such as The Industrial Relations Act: An Introduction (1971) and W. Somerset Maugham (1969). Other major figures interviewed by Hart in the course of his career included Dennis Potter, Terence Rattigan and Sir John Gielgud.

For the children's LP series Tale Spinners for Children, he played the role of Sir Lancelot on the album Knights of the Round Table, the role of Lemuel Gulliver in Gulliver in Lilliput, and the role of Johann Sebastian Bach on the album The Story of Bach.

Hart died in London in 1986, aged 61.

== Works ==
- A View of Venice (1972; with Anthony Armstrong-Jones, 1st Earl of Snowdon)
