= Keith McCune =

American novelist

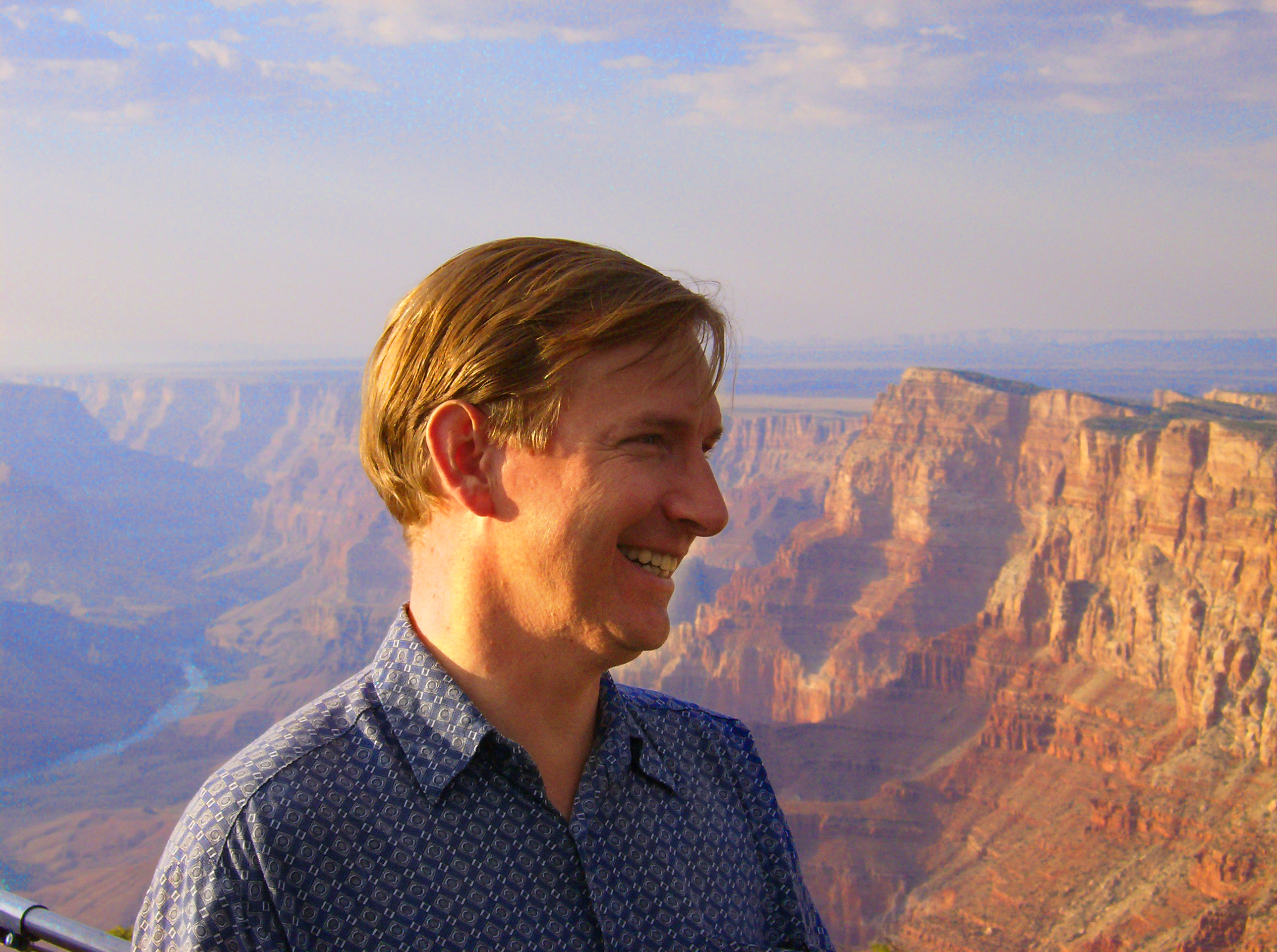
- Keith McCune at the Grand Canyon in 2006, portrait by Adam McCune.
- Born: Keith Michael McCune; December 23, 1955 (age 70); United States
- Education: University of Michigan
- Occupations: Novelist; linguist; translator
- Spouse: Grace Osborn
- Children: 3
- Website: www.ratsofhamelin.com

Keith Michael McCune (born December 23, 1955) is an American linguist, novelist, and translator. His study of Indonesian roots has been called "perhaps the most detailed and complete single work in the field of phonosemantics," He has written a novel that retells the legend of the Pied Piper of Hamelin, which earned praise from Michael Boyer, the official Piper Piper of Hamelin, Germany.

== Biography ==
McCune was born in 1955 to Frederick and Marguerite McCune. He attended college at the University of Virginia and went on to get his doctorate in linguistics at the University of Michigan, where he met Grace Osborn, who was also pursuing a doctorate in linguistics and later married him.

He and Grace spent five years in the Philippines, making translations into Ibanag. In 1992, they moved to Russia, working in Moscow, Makhachkala, and Krasnodar, then moved to Odesa, Ukraine. In 2009, they returned to the Philippines as translation consultants.

Keith and Grace have three children, Adam, Arwen, and Eden.

== Publications ==
- The Internal Structure of Indonesian Roots (Nusa, 1985) was his two-volume doctoral dissertation at University of Michigan in 1983 before it was published two years later in Jakarta, Indonesia by the Universitas Katolik Indonesia Atma Jaya, as volumes 21 and 22 of their NUSA series.
- "The Tale of the Good Wife" (Cricket 26.11, July 1999, 27-31) is a retelling of a Kumyk folk tale from Dagestan, a province of Russia where McCune spent two years.
- The Rats of Hamelin (Moody Publishers, 2005) is a historical fantasy novel he coauthored with his son, Adam McCune. It is a retelling of the legend of the Pied Piper of Hamelin.
