= Christopher Healy =

American children's book author

Christopher Healy (born in New York City) is an American author of children's books.

Since 2012, he has published seven novels for children under the Walden Pond Press imprint of HarperCollins: the Hero's Guide trilogy, the Perilous Journey of Danger & Mayhem trilogy and a Hero's Guide spinoff, No One Leaves the Castle. He has also contributed to the short story anthology, Guys Read: Heroes and Villains, and authored a picture book, This is Not That Kind of Book, published by Penguin Random House.

Prior to writing children's books, he published a nonfiction guide for fathers, Pop Culture (2006). He has also written reviews, essays and reported pieces for publications including the New York Times Book Review, Real Simple, Salon, and the Washington Post.

He teaches writing and language arts in New Jersey, where he lives with his family.

== Awards and Honors ==
Healy's debut novel, The Hero's Guide to Saving Your Kingdom, was published by HarperCollins in 2012, with Fox Animation acquiring the film rights. It was a New York Times Book Review Editors' Choice and honored as one of their Notable Children's Books of the year. It was also selected for Amazon's Best Books of the Year, a Kirkus Reviews' Best Young Adult Book Winner, an IndieBound Indie Next List Award winner, and named to the Texas Library Association's 2015 Bluebonnet Award list.

The audio version of all three Hero's Guides books were narrated by Bronson Pinchot; Pinchot won an Audie Award for Best Male Narrator for The Hero's Guide to Being an Outlaw.

In 2022, This is Not That Kind of Book was nominated for the Nevada Young Readers Award.

In 2023, No One Leaves the Castle was chosen as one of Amazon's Best Books of the Month (August), as well as the OwlCrate Jr. Book Club, The Week Junior Book Club and the Scripps National Spelling Bee Book Club. In 2024, it was also named to the Texas Library Association's Lone Star Reading List.

== Works ==
=== Fiction ===
• The Hero's Guide to Saving Your Kingdom (illustrated by Todd Harris, 2012, HarperCollins)

• The Hero's Guide to Storming the Castle (illustrated by Todd Harris, 2013, HarperCollins)

• The Hero's Guide to Being an Outlaw (illustrated by Todd Harris, 2014, HarperCollins)

• A Perilous Journey of Danger & Mayhem: A Dastardly Plot (2018, HarperCollins)

• A Perilous Journey of Danger & Mayhem: The Treacherous Seas (2019, HarperCollins)

• A Perilous Journey of Danger & Mayhem: The Final Gambit (2020, HarperCollins)

• This is Not That Kind of Book (illustrated by Ben Mantle, 2019, Penguin Random House)

• No One Leaves the Castle (2023, HarperCollins)

=== Nonfiction ===
• Pop Culture: The Sane Man's Guide to the Insane World of New Fatherhood (2006, Penguin Random House)
