= Mulan Joins the Army (play) =

Mulan Joins the Army (Chinese:木蘭從軍, simplified 木兰从军 Mulan congjun) is a 1917 Chinese-language play, which was one of the first plays and films with this title on the Hua Mulan story. It is notable for the casting of Beijing Opera legend Mei Lanfang as the heroine.
