= Clare B. Dunkle =

American novelist

- Born: Clare Buckalew; June 11, 1964 (age 62); Fort Worth, Texas, U.S.
- Education: Trinity University (BA); Indiana University (MLS)
- Occupations: Author; librarian
- Children: 2
- Writing career
- Genre: Fantasy
- Notable work: The Hollow Kingdom Trilogy

Clare B. Dunkle (born June 11, 1964) is an American children's fantasy author and librarian.

== Biography ==
Dunkle was born Clare Buckalew in Fort Worth, Texas. She earned a B.A. in Russian with a minor in Latin from Trinity University in San Antonio and worked in Trinity University's library after earning her Master of Library Science from Indiana University Bloomington. For seven years, she and her family lived in the Rheinland Pfalz region of Germany not far from the Roman city of Trier where her husband took a civil engineering position with the Department of Defense at an Air Force base. Dunkle wrote The Hollow Kingdom while living in Germany and submitted it without an agent to Henry Holt, which offered to publish it about six weeks later. Her daughters (Elena and Valerie) attended a boarding school there and read her first four books as a series of letters from home.

== Works ==
The Hollow Kingdom Trilogy

- The Hollow Kingdom (2003)
- Close Kin (2004)
- In the Coils of the Snake (2005)

The Sky Inside Series

- The Sky Inside (2008) - "In a world well-stocked with genius children, the point-of-view focus through an ordinary boy with questionable free will provides a compelling shift from the expected."
- The Walls Have Eyes (2009) - "After an overly expository start, this simple tale provides comforting, enjoyable adventure."

Other Works

- By These Ten Bones (2005)
- The House of Dead Maids (2010)
- Elena Vanishing (2015)
- Hope and Other Luxuries: A Mother's Life with a Daughter's Anorexia (2015)

== Co-author ==
Dunkle co-wrote Elena Vanishing (2015) with her daughter, Elena Dunkle. The memoir recounts Elena’s years-long struggle with anorexia nervosa, including repeated stays in treatment centers and hospitals, and her ongoing recovery. Mother and daughter began working on it in 2009. Elena drew on her own memories of the illness, and Clare did most of the actual writing. Chronicle Books released it alongside Clare’s own memoir for adult readers, Hope and Other Luxuries.

== Awards ==
- The Hollow Kingdom 2004 Mythopoeic Fantasy Award for Children's Literature
