= The Rats of Hamelin =

Book by Adam McCune

- Cover of the First edition
- Author: Adam McCune & Keith McCune
- Language: English
- Genre: Fantasy novel, Historical novel, Fairytale fantasy
- Publisher: Moody Publishers
- Publication date: August 1, 2005
- Publication place: United States
- Media type: Print (Paperback)
- Pages: 290
- ISBN: 0-8024-6701-6
- OCLC: 58546602
- Dewey Decimal: 813/.6 22
- LC Class: PS3613.C3865 R38 2005

The Rats of Hamelin: A Piper's Tale (Moody Publishers, 2005) is a historical fantasy/fairy tale fantasy novel by Adam McCune and Keith McCune.

Set in medieval Germany, the story is based on the legend of the Pied Piper of Hamelin. In this version, however, the Pied Piper is not an expert in magic piping, but an eighteen-year-old apprentice named Hannes (Johannes) who is supposed to kill the rats as his final exam before becoming a Master Piper.

Everything seems to go wrong. Someone is trying to keep the rats in Hamelin—someone with powers like Hannes’s. Hannes had hoped to buy his father’s freedom with the reward, but the Town Council has stolen every penny of the fund and is against Hannes from the beginning. Even the mayor’s daughter, with whom Hannes has fallen in love, seems to think he is getting in the way. In the end, Hannes has to overcome the Town Council, his mysterious enemy, and himself.

== History ==
The Rats of Hamelin is set mostly in the year 1284. At this time, Germany was the Holy Roman Empire, a group of dukedoms loosely united under an emperor. That is why there is talk of involving the Duke of Braunschweig (Brunswick) when a capital crime is committed.

In the backstory of the novel is the Children's Crusade of 1212. This really took place, and the fictional character of the Old Woman of Aerzen is like many real parents who lost their children.

The German cities of Hamelin, Aerzen, (Hessisch-)Oldendorf, and Koeln (Cologne) are real cities, although there may not have been manors with serfs near Aerzen and Oldendorf, and Koeln is not known to have housed a Piper's Guild.

The Pied Piper himself seems to have some historical basis, and is thus a figure of history as well as legend. The Lueneberg Manuscript of 1450, which serves as an epigraph for the novel, sums up the little we know historically about him: "In the year 1284, on the days of John and Paul, the 26th of June, a piper clothed in various colors came and led away 130 children born in Hamelin to Calvary on the Koppen."

== Fantasy ==
Hannes is trained in magical piping by the Piper's Guild. Like other medieval guilds, the Piper's Guild allows workers of one trade to help support one another. The difference is the pipers are no ordinary tradesmen. They use magic to promote justice and mercy wherever they go, and live on the rewards they sometimes receive for the help they give.

Their magical flutes are similar to recorders in that they are played in front, rather than to the side, like a modern flute. The ends are flared, like the ends of trumpets, and there are no stops; everything is done with the fingers.

The pipers use these magical flutes to enter the Pipeworld. Though the pipers never leave the real world (at least not in The Rats of Hamelin), access to the Pipeworld lets them operate in another dimension, layered on top of the world everyone else experiences. In the Pipeworld, pipers use their music and their minds to pull objects with invisible strings, transfer illness from others to themselves, freeze things, summon lightning, control animals, and cast terrible curses. They can also feel other people's souls in the Pipeworld; and if they understand someone's feelings well enough, they can enter that person's mind and experience the memories associated with those feelings. The state of a piper's own mind or soul is very important in the Pipeworld. Spells cast by a piper who has not resolved inner conflicts are vulnerable to attack and theft.

In an address to middle-schoolers in Virginia Beach, Virginia, Adam McCune traced the inspiration of the Childrule curse (from the end of the book) to Isaiah 3:4 in the Bible. In the New International Version, the verse reads, "I will make boys their officials; mere children will govern them."

In addition to the curses that pipers cast, which have obvious effects and take place immediately, there is another kind of curse in The Rats of Hamelin: the one pronounced by the Old Woman of Aerzen. Though there is no reason to think that the Old Woman has magical powers, she nonetheless foretells a curse that eventually takes place.
