= Jessica Day George =

American author (born 1976)

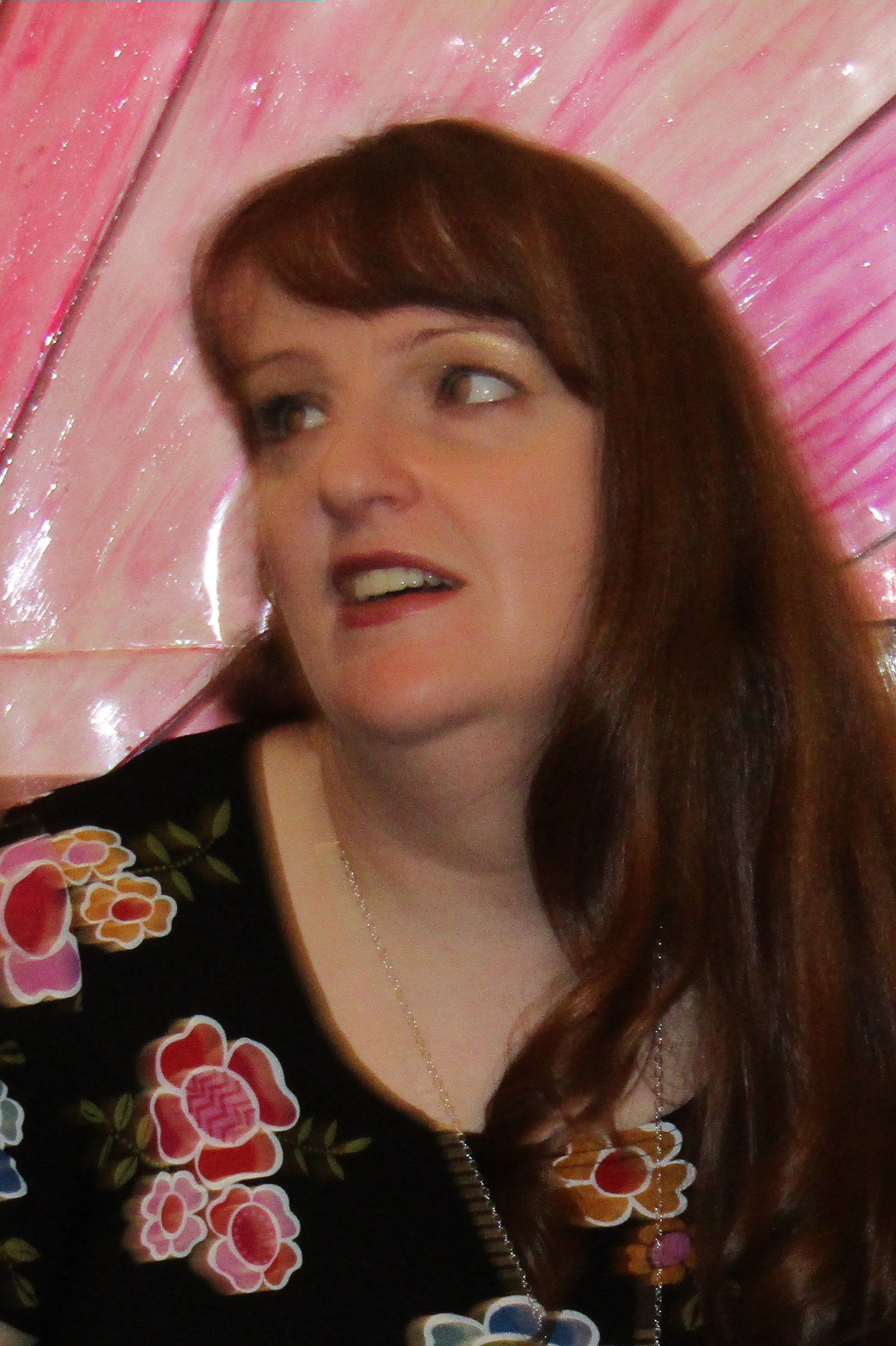
- Jessica Day George in 2018
- Born: October 11, 1976 (age 50); Boise, Idaho, U.S.
- Education: Brigham Young University
- Occupation: Writer
- Writing career
- Period: 2007–present
- Genres: Young adult, Fantasy, Fairy tale
- Subject: Writing
- Website: www.jessicadaygeorge.com

Jessica Day George (born October 11, 1976) is an American author who lives in Utah. She is a New York Times bestselling author of Young Adult fantasy novels, and she received the 2007 Whitney Award for Best Book by a New Author for Dragon Slippers. Having attended Brigham Young University (BYU), George is a member of the Church of Jesus Christ of Latter-day Saints.

== Biography ==
Jessica Day George was raised in Idaho. She later majored in Humanities and Comparative Literature at BYU. George also studied German, Norwegian, and Old Norse at BYU; she studied these languages so she could read Viking sagas in the original written language. Before she began writing full-time, she worked in libraries and bookstores.

Her first publishing offer came from Bloomsbury Publishing for her first draft of Dragon Slippers. Dragon Slippers was published in 2007; she still continues to write for Bloomsbury Publishing. George also runs the website "Bookshop Talk", where she organizes and posts book reviews written by bloggers. George has been the keynote speaker for writer's workshops and teen writing conference. In 2009, George was profiled in the bimonthly periodical magazine Mormon Artist.

Her books and current published series include the Princess series, the Dragonskin Slippers series, and the Castle Glower series, as well as the stand-alone book Sun and Moon, Ice and Snow. Many of her stories are adaptations of classic fairy tales, and have received positive reviews from Kirkus Reviews, Booklist Online, and others. George was on the New York Times bestseller list in May 2013 for Wednesdays in the Tower.

George is a member of The Church of Jesus Christ of Latter-day Saints.

== Bibliography ==
Source (Note: Bibliographical items are found on the Mormon Literature & Creative Arts website and Bloomsbury publishing.)

=== Dragonskin Slippers series ===
- Dragon Slippers (2006)
- Dragon Flight (2008)
- Dragon Spear (2009)

=== The Princesses of Westfalin series ===
- Princess of the Midnight Ball (2009)
- Princess of Glass (2010)
- Princess of the Silver Woods (2012)

=== Castle Glower series ===
- Tuesdays at the Castle (2011)
- Wednesdays in the Tower (2013)
- Thursdays with the Crown (2014)
- Fridays with the Wizards (2015)
- Saturdays at Sea (2017)
- Holidays at the Castle (2026)

=== The Rose Legacy series ===
- The Rose Legacy (2018)
- The Queen's Secret (2019)
- The Rider's Reign (2020)

=== Standalone books ===
- Sun and Moon, Ice and Snow (2008)
- Silver in the Blood (2015)

== Podcasts ==
She has contributed to the writing podcast Writing Excuses as a guest author several times.

== Awards ==
Year	Organization	Award title, Category	Work	Result	Refs
2007	Whitney Award	Best Novel by a New Author	Dragon Slippers	Won	
2007	Whitney Award	Best Novel	Dragon Slippers	Nominated	
2007	Whitney Award	Speculative Fiction	Dragon Slippers	Nominated	
2008	Whitney Award	Youth Fiction	Sun and Moon, Ice and Snow	Nominated	
2009	South Carolina Association of School Librarians	South Carolina Young Adult Book Award	Princess of the Midnight Ball	Nominated	
2009	Whitney Award	Youth Fiction	Princess of the Midnight Ball	Nominated	
2011	Children's Literature Association of Utah	Beehive Book Award for Young Adult Fiction	Princess of the Midnight Ball	Won	
2011	Whitney Award	Youth Fiction—Speculative	Tuesdays at the Castle	Nominated	
2011	Utah Center for the Book	Utah Book Award—Children’s	Tuesdays at the Castle	Won	
2013	Whitney Award	Middle Grade	Wednesdays in the Tower	Nominated	

== See also ==
- The Twelve Dancing Princesses
- East of the Sun and West of the Moon
