= Princess of the Midnight Ball =

2009 novel by Jessica Day George

- First edition cover
- Author: Jessica Day George
- Cover artist: Larry Rostant, Donna Mark
- Language: English
- Genre: Fantasy
- Publisher: Bloomsbury
- Publication date: 2009
- Publication place: United States
- English publication date: 2009
- Pages: 272
- ISBN: 1-59990-322-9
- Followed by: Princess of Glass

Princess of the Midnight Ball is a 2009 young adult fantasy novel written by Jessica Day George. It is based on the fairy tale "The Twelve Dancing Princesses".

== Plot summary ==
Princess Rose and her sisters Lily, Jonquil, Hyacinth, Violet, Daisy, Poppy, Iris, Lilac, Orchid, Pansy, and Petunia are trapped in a curse. Every third night, they have to dance at the Midnight Ball with the twelve sons of the King Under Stone, who lives in a realm below the earth. The curse prevents them from speaking of it, and every prince who attempts to learn their secret in hopes of marrying one of them and inheriting the crown ends up dead by the next full moon.

Galen Werner is a soldier who is returning from the Westfalin-Analousia war. On his way to the city of Bruch to live with his mother's sister Liesel Orm, Galen meets an old woman. After he shares his food with her, the woman gives him white and black yarn and an invisibility cloak, saying that he would have to use them when "He" tries to get to the surface.

When Galen meets Rose, she knows that he can try to break the curse, but will he succeed despite the complications they come across?

== Characters ==
- Galen Werner: The protagonist of the story, the only son of a soldier and an army laundress. Galen had been a soldier since he was fifteen when his father died in battle. With the Westfalin-Analousia war over, Galen Werner goes to live with his mother's sister and her family.
- Princess Rose: Another protagonist, the eldest daughter of King Gregor and the late Queen Maude. She is protective of her sisters and wants desperately to break the curse they inherited from their mother. Rose is clever and courageous but is deeply burdened with the curse of dancing at the Midnight Ball. She is 18 at the time.
- Princess Lily: The second daughter of King Gregor, who has worked with Rose for years to attempt to break the spell upon them. She is described as a gracious and artful young woman, as well as endlessly brave. She is an excellent shot with a pistol, having been taught by her sweetheart, Heinrich Orm, Galen's cousin, before he left to become a soldier. She is 17.
- The King Under Stone: The prime antagonist, who manipulated circumstances that forced Queen Maude to dance to provide him with energy and then have her bear twelve daughters to become brides for his twelve sons. His true name is Wolfram von Aue and was trapped long ago underground by the power of twelve magicians.
- King Gregor: The King of Westfalin and the father of Rose and her sisters. Out of love for his wife, Queen Maude, he ordered a Breton garden to be made, containing each of her favorite flowers. He loves his daughters deeply and despairs that they are mysteriously exhausting themselves each night, dancing until their shoes are worn out.
- Walter Vogel: An elderly gardener who has worked in the Queen's Garden since Rose was born. He becomes Galen's mentor when Galen becomes one of the palace gardeners, and indirectly aids Galen to discover the secret of the princesses and help defeat the King Under Stone. It is stated on the author's website that Walter was named after the German poet Walter von der Vogelweide.
- The Orm Family: Galen's only surviving family. His aunt, Liesel, is the sister of Galen's mother Renata, and she welcomes him into her home. Liesel's husband, Reiner, is a proud man who does not trust others easily and is proud of his position as the king's Chief Gardener. Liesel and Reiner's daughter is Ulrike, a gentle sentimental girl who enjoys reading, while their son Heinrich and Princess Lily were in love. Because Heinrich chose to become a soldier rather than remaining a gardener during the Westfalin-Analousian war, Reiner disowned him and convinced his wife and daughter that Heinrich died. Heinrich and Lily eventually marry.
- The Other Princesses: Rose and Lily's younger sisters, the daughters of King Gregor and late Queen Maude, in order of age. The three eldest princesses are known as the "Older Set" and the three youngest form the "Youngest Set", with the six remaining sisters known as the "In-Betweens."

- Jonquil, the third eldest princess, well-known for her good looks and her tendency to dress ostentatiously. She shares a room with Lily and Rose; the three eldest princesses are known as the "Older Set." She is 16. By the events of Princess of the Silver Woods, she remains unmarried as recurring nightmares of her experience at the Midnight Balls have marred her beauty and discouraged her suitors.
- Hyacinth, the fourth eldest princess, known to be extremely pious and prays often, but is also said to be graceful and an exquisite dancer. She shares a room with Violet and the twins. She is 15. In the years after the Midnight Balls, Hyacinth becomes considerably more forceful towards the King Under Stone's successors. In Princess of the Silver Woods, she has married Jacques, an Analousian aristocrat.
- Violet, the fifth eldest, is musically inclined. She loves to play the pianoforte and is a fine singer, but is also good at cards. She is 14. In Princess of the Silver Woods, it is revealed that she has married the son of the Archduke von Schwabian, Prince Frederick, who shares Violet's musical inclinations.
- Poppy and Daisy, twin sisters, the sixth (Poppy) and seventh (Daisy) eldest in their family. Poppy is tough and outspoken and an excellent cardsharp, while Daisy is easily frightened and well-behaved. The twins are 13 during the novel. Poppy is the heroine of the sequel, Princess of Glass, where she develops a relationship with Prince Christian of the Danelaw during their stay in Breton, whom she marries at the conclusion of Princess of the Silver Woods. Daisy eventually marries Prince Ricard of Venenzia.
- Iris, the eighth princess, known to be kindhearted. She is 12.
- Lilac, the ninth princess, who enjoys watching plays. She is 11.
- Orchid, the tenth princess, who also enjoys watching plays and is rather studious. She and Iris are often mistaken for one another, even though Orchid distinctly wears spectacles. She forms the "Youngest Set" with her sisters Pansy and Petunia. She is 10.
- Pansy, the second youngest princess, a delicate girl who hates dancing to the point of hysteria and Rose fears that Pansy may lose her sanity over time if they are forced to continue. Her favorite sister is Lily. She is 7.
- Petunia, the youngest princess who still loves to dance, not fully understanding the implications of the curse of the King Under Stone. She is 6 years old during Princess of the Midnight Ball. Petunia is described as being very short in her adolescence, which strengthens her resemblance to her mother, Queen Maude. She is the heroine of the series' third book, Princess of the Silver Woods, when she is approximately 16 years old and had spent time in Russaka as a guest of Grand Duchess Volenskaya during Princess of Glass.

- Under Stone's Sons: All twelve of the King Under Stone's sons are half-mortal; according to Queen Maude's diaries, their mothers were princesses who were somehow summoned by Under Stone. The other sons mentioned in the novel include Blathen (Poppy's dance partner), Tirolian (Daisy's dance partner), Telinros (Pansy's partner), and Kestilan (Petunia's partner). A story told at the beginning of the novel implies that four of the sons were mothered by four princesses of Russaka. On Jessica Day George's website (under the Princess of the Silver Woods section), the princes not mentioned by name in the book are Parian (Lily's partner), Stavian (Hyacinth's partner), Kadros (Violet's partner), Derivos (Iris's partner), Talivor (Lilac's partner), and Hapken (Orchid's partner). The nine older sons are each a son of one of the Nine Daughters of Russaka, the daughters of the Emperor of Russaka; the three youngest sons are the sons of minor nobility. Kestilan’s mother was a Belgique countess, as the Grand Duchess Volenskaya says in the third book.
  - Illiken: The eldest son of the King Under Stone, another antagonist. Rose's dance partner at the Midnight Ball. Like the rest of Under Stone's sons, he fears his father. When his father is killed, Illiken receives his powers and becomes the new King. Upon inheriting his father's powers, he becomes much more dangerous and openly cruel.
  - Rionin: One of the King Under Stone's sons. He is Jonquil's dance partner. He notably leads Under Stone's sons above ground to abduct the princesses when illness prevents them from attending the Midnight Ball, though they are warded off when Lily shoots at them. He is described as less stoic than his brothers and known for being particularly cruel. In the sequel Princess of Glass, Rionin is the new King Under Stone, presumably after the deaths of both Illiken and Lily's partner, and enjoys taunting his former partner Jonquil by suggesting Rose or Lily are more suitable brides for himself.
- Queen Maude: King Gregor's late wife and the mother to the princesses. She was the one responsible for placing the curse upon her daughters; she had bargained with the King Under Stone for a child (only to get eleven more), and then again to end the war. She comes from Breton and brought a number of Bretoner ladies-in-waiting, including Anne Lewiston and Emily Ellsworth-Saxony (the former becoming the governess to Maude's daughters and the latter eventually marrying the Earl of Saxeborg-Rohlstein and becoming the mother of Oliver, Petunia's love interest).
- Anne Lewiston: The princesses' governess from Breton, an educated and accomplished woman. Anne had originally accompanied Queen Maude to Westfalin as an interpreter and confidante but was requested to remain in Westfalin to become the governess of the princesses. However, when the princesses' nightly dancing comes to light, Anne is accused of witchcraft and imprisoned until Galen is able to clear her name by solving the mystery regarding the princesses' curse.
- Dr Kelling: The royal physician who is also good friends with the family and grew up with King Gregor.
- Bishop Schelker: The highest-ranking clergyman in Westfalin, as well as the royal family's personal priest and a personal friend of King Gregor, as well as Petunia's godfather. He is surprisingly open towards supernatural occurrences.

== See also ==
- "The Twelve Dancing Princesses"
- Princess of Glass
