= Bella at Midnight =

2006 children's fantasy novel by Diane Stanley

- First edition, 2006
- Author: Diane Stanley
- Cover artist: Bagram Ibatoulline (illustrator)
- Language: English
- Genre: Fantasy novel
- Publisher: HarperCollins
- Publication date: March 28, 2006
- Publication place: United States
- Media type: Print (hardback)
- Pages: 278
- ISBN: 0-06-077573-4
- OCLC: 58432209
- LC Class: PZ7.S7869 Bel 2006

Bella at Midnight is a fantasy novel for children by Diane Stanley. The story is based on the fairy tale Cinderella. It was first published in 2006.

== Plot ==
Maud's sister Catherine has just married Sir Edward of Burning Wood when he forbids her to see her family again. Three years later, Maud receives an urgent summons from her brother-in-law to aid her sister in childbirth. The child is delivered safely, but Catherine falls ill and dies. Edward flies into a fury and orders Maud to get rid of the child.

Maud christens the child Isabel, after her late grandmother, and gives her to the family of a blacksmith named Martin. His wife, Beatrice, recently served as a wet nurse to the fourth son of the king, Prince Julian. The prince frequently returns to visit over the course of his childhood, and he and Isabel, or "Bella", become fast friends.

One day, when Julian is older, he is approached by Bella in front of his peers. But instead of acknowledging her as a friend, he pretends not to know her. Later, he is on his way to apologize to her when a messenger stops him to inform him that he is to be a hostage in a neighboring kingdom, Brutanna, with which they had been at war. The captivity is to enforce a peace treaty between the two kingdoms.

Some time later, Maud returns to Bella's village with a summons from her father, who has recently remarried. Bella sorrowfully leaves her family and journeys with her aunt to meet her father. Once there she finds him still cold and cruel, and her stepmother Matilda and stepsister Marianne unkind as well. Her other stepsister Alice has been silent ever since the death of her father.

Marianne becomes lady-in-waiting to the queen, and thus is privy to some royal secrets. When she comes home she gossips with her family about the plot to attack Brutanna at the expense of Julian's life. Bella cries out in protest and expresses her intent to save him, but her stepmother, trying to protect Marianne's place at court, locks her in the storeroom.

Alice sneaks to the storeroom and gives Bella a hairpin to pick the lock with. Once she is free, Alice gives her a ring that shows her the person she wants to see. Bella flees to Maud's house, and Maud gives her the means to save Julian, including a gown and glass slippers.

Bella rides to Brutanna as quickly as possible and warns Julian of the king's plot. Julian rides out to convince his brother to leave, but he is captured. A battle begins between the soldiers of the two kingdoms when the Worthy Knight appears, halting the battle and blinding King Gilbert.

Julian searches for Bella, but only finds her possessions. Sadly, he returns home to act as regent for his brother. He visits Sir Edward's family, where Alice shows him how to use the ring. He sees the Knight and asks Alice to accompany him to find the Knight.

They return to Brutanna to discover that the Worthy Knight is none other than Bella. She is heavily wounded but recovering in the care of a poor man and his son. Julian brings her back to Moranmoor and takes her to visit her adoptive family. He asks Martin for Bella's hand in marriage, and, having consulted Bella and receiving a positive answer, accepts.

== Characters ==
=== Bella ===
Bella is the daughter of Catherine and Sir Edward of Burning Wood. Upon her mother's death, her father orders her aunt Maud to get rid of her. She is raised by Martin the blacksmith and his family and becomes close friends with Prince Julian. Then Prince Julian betrays her after they go to a fair with all the pages he lives with. After he is sent to Brutanna as a hostage, on his way to apologize to Bella. Quickly afterward, her father summons her. She returns to Burning Wood, where she meets her father and new stepfamily. One day her stepsister Marianne brings the news that the king plans to attack Brutanna, endangering Prince Julian. Bella declares her intentions of warning him and her stepmother locks her in the storeroom. That night her stepsister Alice helps her escape. Bella warns Julian in time to save him, but couldn't prevent the battle. Instead she plays the part of the Worthy Knight, stopping the war forever. She is gravely wounded, but rescued by Prince Julian, who takes her back to her adoptive family and asks for her hand in marriage. She accepts.

=== Prince Julian of Moranmoor ===
Prince Julian is the fourth son of King Raymond. He was given to Beatrice until he was three, when he went to live with his uncle, but frequently returns to visit. He is instantly taken with Bella when introduced, and the two become close friends, until he snubs her in front of his peers.
He is on his way to apologize when a messenger stops him and informs him that he is to be a hostage to enforce a peace treaty Moranmoor and the neighboring kingdom Brutanna. He is living with the royal family when Bella comes to warn him of his brother's plot. He rides out to convince his brother to stop the attack, but the king accuses him of cowardice and takes him prisoner.
The battle begins, but is halted by the appearance of the Worthy Knight. Afterwards, unable to locate Bella, Julian sadly returns to Moranmoor to acts as regent for his brother, who was struck blind in the battle. He pays a visit to Burning Wood, where Alice shows him the Worthy Knight in her ring. They set off to find him and discover that "he" is actually Bella. They bring her back to reunite with her adoptive family, and Julian asks for her hand in marriage.

=== Maud ===
Maud is Bella's maternal aunt and godmother. She does everything in her power to help her goddaughter, including giving her supplies for her quest to rescue Prince Julian.

=== Matilda ===
Matilda is Bella's stepmother. She has become bitter ever since the death of her husband and loss of their wealth. She takes her anger out on her new husband and stepdaughter.

=== Marianne ===
Marianne is Bella's older stepsister. She is placed in court as the queen's lady-in-waiting by her aunt Basilia. She is very rude to Bella and discusses the plans of King Gilbert, which leads to Bella going to rescue Prince Julian.

=== Alice ===
Alice is Bella's younger stepsister. Before her father left on his final voyage, he gave her a ring that allows her to see the whereabouts of any person. After her father's death she rarely speaks. Bella, however, helps her heal from the pain and in return Alice gives her the ring.

=== Lord Percy ===
Lord Percy is Basilia's husband. He is very wealthy, but reluctant to show charity to Matilda and her daughters, doing so only out of duty.

=== Basilia ===
Basilia is Matilda's sister. The two had a falling out when they were each married, and Basilia enjoys gloating over her sister's misfortune. However, she helps Marianne find a place at court.

=== King Harry of Brutanna ===
King Harry is the King of Brutanna, with which Moranmoor has been at war for over a hundred years. When the treaty for peace is signed and Prince Julian becomes a hostage, he treats the prince quite kindly. The King is attending his daughter Princess Marguerite's wedding when he is attacked by King Gilbert.

=== Martin ===
The adopted father of Bella who took care of Bella, Prince Julian, Will, and Margaret as babies.

=== Beatrice ===
The adopted mother of Bella who took care of Bella, Prince Julian, Will, and Margaret as babies.

=== Will and Margaret ===
The son and daughter of Beatrice and Martin. Bella thinks they are her siblings but soon finds out that they are not her family.

== Family tree ==
Grandfather | Isabel (deceased)
Catherine (deceased) | Sir Edward of Burning Wood | Matilda | Maud "Mary"
Isabel "Bella" | Marianne | Alice

== Reception ==
Reviewers have praised the story as being a new take on the classic fairytale and the character of Bella for being a strong, courageous young woman. Some critics have criticized the use of alternating point of view, saying that it makes the story slow and confusing to follow. Others have claimed that some of the material, such as the details about birth, were inappropriate for the age level for which the book is written (34-34).

== Awards ==
Bella at Midnight has won the following awards:

- Texas Bluebonnet Award (nominee)
- New York Public Library Books for the Teen Age
- School Library Journal Best Book
- ALA Booklist Editors’ Choice
