= Jackson Pearce =

American author (born 1984)

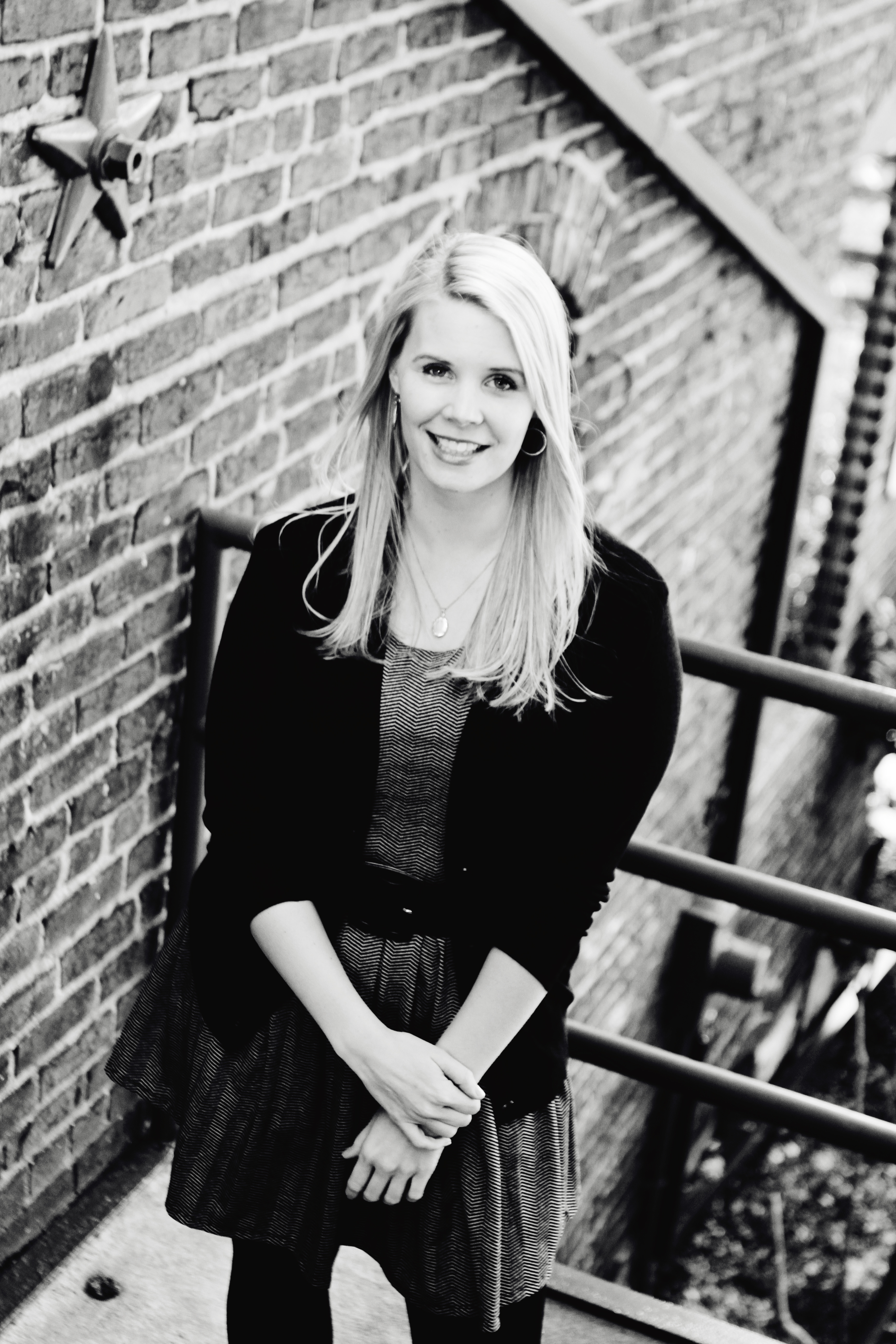
- Born: 1984 (age 41–42); Raleigh, North Carolina, U.S.
- Occupation: Author
- Writing career
- Pen name: J. Nelle Patrick
- Genre: Young-adult fantasy
- Notable works: Ellie, Engineer series, Pip Bartlett series, Sisters Red series
- Website: jackson-pearce.com

Jackson Pearce (born 1984) is an American author. She writes young adult fiction, middle grade fiction, romance, and also publishes as J. Nelle Patrick.

== Personal life and education ==
Pearce was born in Raleigh, North Carolina and, as of 2018, lives in Decatur, Georgia. She started writing at the age of twelve. She attended Brookwood High School and went on to Georgia College & State University before transferring to and graduating from the University of Georgia where she received her degree in English, minoring in philosophy.

== Bibliography ==
- As You Wish (August 25, 2009, ISBN 978-0-06-166152-5)
- Purity (April 24, 2012) ISBN 978-0-31618-246-1
- Tsarina (2014; as J. Nelle Patrick) ISBN 978-1-59514-693-9
- Six Ways To Write A Love Letter (2022)

=== Fairy Tale series ===
1. Sisters Red (June 7, 2010, ISBN 978-0-316-06868-0)
2. Sweetly (August 23, 2011, ISBN 978-0-316-06865-9)
3. Fathomless (September 4, 2012, ISBN 978-0-316-20778-2)
4. Cold Spell (November 2013, ISBN 978-0-316-24359-9)

=== Doublecross series ===
1. The Doublecross ISBN 978-1-61963-414-5
2. The Inside Job (July 2016, ISBN 9781619634206)

=== Pip Bartlett series ===
1. Pip Bartlett's Guide to Magical Creatures ISBN 9780545838337
2. Pip Bartlett's Guide to Unicorn Training ISBN 9780545709293
3. Pip Bartlett's Guide to Sea Monsters

=== Ellie, Engineer series ===
1. Ellie, Engineer
2. Ellie, Engineer: The Next Level ISBN 97816 81195216
3. Ellie, Engineer: In the Spotlight
