= Adam McCune =

American writer

Adam Forrest McCune
- Born: July 18, 1985 (age 41); Virginia Beach, Virginia, U.S.
- Education: Wheaton College (BA); University of Virginia (MA); University of North Carolina at Chapel Hill (PhD)
- Occupations: Novelist, playwright
- Website: www.adam-mccune.com

Adam Forrest McCune (born July 18, 1985) is an American novelist and playwright.

== Biography ==
McCune was born on July 18, 1985, in Virginia Beach, Virginia, to Keith and Grace McCune, and was raised in the Philippines and Russia.

In the year 2000, when McCune was fourteen, his father showed him a three-page short story based on the legend of the Pied Piper of Hamelin, and asked McCune to help him develop it. That short story became the 250-page novel, The Rats of Hamelin, which was published by Moody Publishers just before McCune's senior year at Wheaton College.

In 2014, while a graduate student at the University of North Carolina at Chapel Hill, McCune wrote a one-act play, Jack and Alice, adapted from Jane Austen's story of the same name, and the play was performed at that year's Jane Austen Summer Program (JASP). He then went on to write one-act plays adapted from Austen and performed at JASP over the next decade: Henry and Eliza (2015), Lovers' Vows at Mansfield Park (2016), Catherine, or, the Bower (2017), Lesley Castle (2018), Love and Friendship (2019), The History of England (2021), Austen and Shakespeare (2022), The Three Sisters (2022), Evelyn (2023). The Jane Austen Summer Program then published the ten plays in a single volume entitled Austen Staged (2023).

McCune has received degrees in English from Wheaton College, Illinois (BA, 2006), the University of Virginia (MA, 2011), and the University of North Carolina at Chapel Hill (PhD, 2016). He has taught British literature and composition at Baylor University.

== Books ==
- The Rats of Hamelin: A Piper’s Tale (Moody Publishers, 2005), co-authored with his father, Keith McCune
- Austen Staged: Jane Austen’s Short Stories Adapted as One-Act Plays (Jane Austen Summer Program, 2023)

== Web Articles ==
- "AIDS & the Church: An Opportunity to Show God's Love" (TEAM Horizons Vol. 2, Iss. 2, 2007)
- "Pioneers Of American Industrial Design: Elegance For Everyday Life" (Beyond the Perf Issue 029, Jul 25, 2011) (no byline, but listed in Adam McCune's writing portfolio on his website)
- "Frozen: Thawing a Heart for Community" (Ethos: A Digital Review of Arts, Humanities, and Public Ethics, March 28, 2014)
- "‘Swift winged words’: the vocabulary and word distribution of Blake/An Illustrated Quarterly" (The Blog of the Blake Archive and Blake Quarterly, April 1, 2016)

== Journal Articles ==
- “A Unique Text of Byron’s ‘Go—triumph securely.’” Keats-Shelley Journal, vol. 64, 2015, pp. 35–41.
- “‘What a Boy (or Girl) Wants’ in The Turn of the Screw: The Children’s Frankly-Expressed Motives for their Performances.” English Studies, vol. 98, no. 8, 2017, pp. 951–67.
- “‘Attract Thy Fairy Fingers Near the Lyre’: Scripting and Performing Childhood in Byron’s ‘To Ianthe.’” Byron Journal, vol. 46, no. 1, 2018, pp. 37–47.
- “The Name ‘Ianthe’ and a Pregnancy by Byron in a Letter of Lady Oxford’s.” Byron Journal, vol. 47, no. 1, 2019, pp. 43–53.
