= The Hollow Kingdom Trilogy =

Series of three books by Clare B. Dunkle

- The Hollow Kingdom, the first novel in series
- The Hollow Kingdom; Close Kin; In the Coils of the Snake
- Author: Clare B. Dunkle
- Country: United States
- Language: English
- Genre: Fantasy, young adult fiction
- Publisher: Henry Holt
- Published: 2003–2005
- Media type: Print (hardcover and paperback); Audiobook

The Hollow Kingdom Trilogy is a fantasy trilogy written by Clare B. Dunkle. The series includes The Hollow Kingdom, Close Kin, In the Coils of the Snake and a number of short stories published on Dunkle's official website. The Hollow Kingdom won the 2004 Mythopoeic Fantasy Award for Children's Literature.

== Plot ==
=== The Hollow Kingdom ===
The Hollow Kingdom is the October 2003 first book in The Hollow Kingdom Trilogy by Clare B. Dunkle. The protagonist is Kate, a young woman who is forced to marry the goblin king, Marak.

This story takes place in 1815 on a country estate called Hallow Hill. For thousands of years, young women have been vanishing from the estate and nearby village, never to be seen again. Now Kate and Emily, young girls of refinement, have come to live at Hallow Hill. Brought up in a civilized age, they have no idea of the land's dreadful heritage until they meet the goblins who live underground in Hollow Hill. One of the first goblins they meet is Marak Sixfinger, the goblin king who intends to make Kate, the older of the sisters, his wife. Kate isn't the first person he's married, but his first wife went mad. He took a more strategic approach with Kate, trying to get to know her before actually kidnapping her. After much resistance, Kate offers herself to Marak in exchange for his help in rescuing Emily from their cousin who has kidnapped her. Marak enacts revenge on Kate's cousin for kidnapping Emily by casting a spell that will only allow him to walk on the ceiling. After the revenge and rescue, both girls are taken by the goblins to their kingdom.

The wedding ceremony between Kate and Marak is performed, during which it is revealed that Kate is part elf. Elves are thought to be extinct and the addition of elven blood into the King's line is greatly celebrated. Amid the many parts of the wedding ceremony which makes Kate the King's Wife, she is given The King's Wife's Charm, a magical charm which will protect her. When the King's Wife is not in danger the charm appears to be a tattoo of a golden snake which wraps around Kate's neck and down her arm. Kate and Emily adjust to their new home and find happiness there. After some time has passed, trouble strikes the Hollow Kingdom when a goblin is kidnapped. This is followed by a sickness which attacks several of the remaining goblins, one by one putting them into a living sleep. Kate must leave the kingdom and find a way to save them. She awakens the King's Wife's Charm, names her simply Charm, and working with Charm, go to London where they confront the sorcerer who had used the goblin he kidnapped to steal the spirits of other goblins. They defeat him and rescue the goblins. Kate also finds a human baby the magician had in a cage. She takes the baby and Charm names her Matilda (Til) after one of her favorite Kings' Wives. The book ends with Kate giving birth to her son and the next goblin king, Catspaw. As is normal for King's Wives, Kate begins to sob at the first sight of her son, because he has the forearm of a lion.

=== Close Kin ===
Close Kin is the second book in The Hollow Kingdom Trilogy by Clare B. Dunkle. Its protagonists include Seylin, the goblin who looks like an elf, Emily, Kate's younger sister also known as M or Em, and Sable, a scarred and abused elf.

This book takes place eight years after the previous one, in 1822. Emily is now old enough to marry. Unfortunately, when her friend Seylin proposes, she doesn't pay attention and refuses him. Devastated, Seylin leaves to find his own people: the elves. His search leads him to Sable's band of elves. Thorn, the self-proclaimed leader, treats Sable badly because she scarred herself to get out of marrying him and dying in childbirth. He plans on marrying Irina when she turns eighteen. Other members of the band include Rowen, an elf man who lost his wife, Laurel, in childbirth and Willow, a young elf boy. Seylin tries to fit in with them but cannot because he is so different from them and because he cannot stand the horrible way Sable is treated.

Emily finds out Seylin was trying to propose to her after he leaves to find the elves. She sets out to find him and is forced to bring her former teacher, Ruby, with her. In her search for him, Emily accidentally awakens long-dormant prejudices. They learn more about elf culture and find a mistreated goblin child, Richard, along with the twins he is trying to raise, Jack and Martha. They plan on taking them back to the Hollow Kingdom with them. Emily finds Seylin just as he is about to leave the elves. There is a confrontation and goblins sent by Marak to watch Seylin knock Thorn, Rowan, and Willow out. They take Sable and Irina with them to Hollow Hill. Tinsel marries Sable and Thaydar marries Irina. Emily and Seylin also marry and Seylin finally accepts that though he looks like an elf, he is truly a goblin.

=== In the Coils of the Snake ===
In The Coils of the Snake is the final book in The Hollow Kingdom Trilogy by Clare B. Dunkle. It follows Miranda, the daughter of Matilda (Til), the baby found at the end of The Hollow Kingdom.

After the death of Marak, the king of the goblins, Miranda becomes betrothed to his son, Catspaw. The engagement is broken when a mysterious elf lord called Nir shows up with his tribe of elves. Nir offers Catspaw an elf bride in exchange for peace. The new goblin king reluctantly accepts. Miranda is devastated. All her life, Marak had groomed her to be a King's Wife. Now, without him there to guide her, and the future he planned for her gone, she decides to commit suicide. Nir finds her before she can do it and brings her to his camp where he performs a spell on her called the Seven Stars. This spell keeps Miranda under Nir's control. Catspaw is furious when he finds out what Nir did with Miranda but cannot do anything because of the truce.

In the Hollow Kingdom, Catspaw marries the elf woman Nir allowed him to take in exchange for peace, Arianna. She runs from him at every chance she gets. Her behavior gets her sick with exhaustion, forcing Catspaw to restrict her to her bed so she can get some rest. Arianna confides in Kate that she's afraid Catspaw is going to deform her. Kate tells Catspaw, who clears it up. He and Arianna start getting along. She tells him about Nir and how his magic killed his first wife. Nir and Miranda start getting along too as they live together and tell each other about their pasts. Miranda falls in love with him and refuses to take an opportunity to escape because she wants to stay with him. Sable badmouths Nir to Miranda, which makes the elf lord treat her harshly. Sable returns to the goblin kingdom and, upon reaching there, apparently dies. Nir tells Miranda he plans to marry her as soon as she turns eighteen. Then he leaves for two weeks to perform a spell to protect his people.

While Nir is gone, Catspaw comes to the elf camp to get revenge for Sable who is being kept alive by magic. To keep Catspaw and the other goblins from hurting Nir, Miranda agrees to go back to living with them. However, she cannot go back into the kingdom because of the Seven Stars spell so she has to stay in an old elf prison with an elf guard, Hunter, and a goblin guard, Tattoo. Her guards become friends. Seylin visits her and gets her to tell him everything she knows about Nir. From that information he realizes Nir is not just an ordinary elf lord, but an elf King, the line of which had been thought dead and gone. Nir comes back to find Miranda gone. He immediately plans on attacking the goblins to get her back. Nir and Catspaw fight but neither can hurt the other because they are both the kings of their races and like brother kings. Seylin explains this to them and Miranda is returned to Nir. The elves and goblins develop friendships following the struggle.

== Reception ==
- The Hollow Kingdom - "Dunkle pens an inconsistent fantasy. Frequently magical, with compelling plot twists, but weakened by awkward timing and uneven structure."
- Close Kin - "Racial integration through wife-napping makes for awkward fantasy, despite a compellingly intricate structure. Disturbing gender roles, excessive moralizing, and a rushed and incongruous conclusion keep this sequel from achieving its rather strong potential."
- In the Coils of the Snake - "A trilogy, which opened with some promise, sadly resolves without ever growing beyond a disappointing collection of feeble, uninteresting heroines. Not a substantial contribution to the strong genre of romantic fantasy."

== Awards and nominations ==
In 2004, The Hollow Kingdom won the Mythopoeic Fantasy Award for Children's Literature.
