= The Hero's Guide to Saving Your Kingdom =

2012 children's novel

- Author: Christopher Healy
- Audio read by: Bronson Pinchot
- Illustrator: Todd Harris
- Language: English
- Series: Hero's Guide Series
- Genre: Middle grade fiction, fantasy, fairy tale
- Set in: The Thirteen Kingdoms
- Publisher: Walden Pond Press
- Publication date: May 1, 2012
- Media type: Print (hardcover, paperback), audio book
- Pages: 436 (Hardcover)
- ISBN: 978-0-0621-1743-4
- OCLC: 813286624
- Dewey Decimal: 813.6
- LC Class: 17173632
- Followed by: Hero's Guide to Storming the Castle
- Website: Official Series Website

The Hero's Guide to Saving Your Kingdom is the first book in the Hero's Guide trilogy, a children's middle grade series by author Christopher Healy. It was published by Walden Pond Press, an imprint of HarperCollins, in 2012. The US version of the book is illustrated by Todd Harris; foreign editions have featured other illustrators.

The Hero's Guide series also features the books The Hero's Guide to Storming the Castle and The Hero's Guide to Being An Outlaw.

== Plot ==
The book centers on the misadventures of four famous fairy-tale princes who've each been generically dubbed Prince Charming.

== Critical reception ==
A Hero's Guide to Saving Your Kingdom was named as one of the New York Times Book Review's Notable Children's Books of 2012 and was an Editors' Choice. The book was also featured as an IndieBound Indie Next List Winner, a Kirkus Reviews Best Young Adult Book Winner, and one of Amazon's Best Books of the Year. Three years after publication, it was named to the Texas Library Association's 2015 Bluebonnet Award list. The book received a starred review from Kirkus Reviews, which described it as "inventive and hilarious".
