= Princess of Glass =

2010 fantasy novel by Jessica Day George

- First edition
- Author: Jessica Day George
- Cover artist: Larry Rostant, Donna Mark
- Language: English
- Genre: Fantasy
- Publisher: Bloomsbury Press
- Publication date: 2010
- Publication place: United States
- English publication date: 2010
- Pages: 257
- ISBN: 978-1-59990-478-8
- Preceded by: Princess of the Midnight Ball
- Followed by: Princess of the Silver Woods

Princess of Glass is a 2010 fantasy novel written by Jessica Day George, published by Bloomsbury Press. It is based on "Cinderella" and is a sequel to the book Princess of the Midnight Ball (which is based on "The Twelve Dancing Princesses").

== Summary ==
A couple of years after being freed from the curse of the King Under Stone, who had forced her and her eleven sisters to dance, Princess Poppy of Westfalin finds herself participating in an exchange program where princes and princesses spend time in other countries in Ionia, in the hopes of bringing the nations closer. Poppy finds herself going to her late mother's home country of Breton, where she stays with relatives. Since the curse, Poppy has sworn off dancing forever, and attends balls only to play cards.

In Breton, Poppy soon befriends Prince Christian of the Danelaw. In the midst of their budding relationship, Christian and a hapless maid named Ellen quickly become the targets of the Corley, a dangerous and vindictive creature who will stop at nothing to make sure her revenge is completed.
