= The Practical Princess and Other Liberating Fairy Tales =

1979 short story collection by Jay Williams

- First edition
- Author: Jay Williams
- Publisher: Scholastic
- Publication date: 1979

The Practical Princess and Other Liberating Fairy Tales is a collection of six short stories, written by Jay Williams, in 1979, and published by Hippo from Scholastic. Each story features nods in some way to classic fairy tales.

== Contents ==
=== Blurbs ===
- "What was the fairy thinking of when she gave the gift of common sense to a baby princess? After all, what does a princess but beauty and charm? But Princess Bedelia's common sense brought her through many difficult situations."
- "Princess Bedelia was as lovely as the moon and as graceful as a cat leaping. But the third good fairy who came to her cradle when she was born gave her the wonderful gift of common sense! "What does a princess need with common sense?" asked the king, her father... But it was this third gift that enabled her to escape the dragon and expose her elderly suitor, Lord Garp, as a fraud. And when she released Prince Perian from an ancient spell, she was practical enough to insist that she wanted to see what he really looked like before marrying him!... This is just one of the six refreshingly different fairy stories in this delightful book. For readers of seven-years-old and up."

=== The Practical Princess ===
The Practical Princess was first published in 1969 by Parents Magazine Press as a standalone picture book, with award-winning illustrations by Friso Henstra, reissued in 2016 by Purple House Press.

==== Plot ====
The newborn Princess Bedelia of Arapathia is blessed by three good fairies with the gifts of beauty, grace (à la Sleeping Beauty), &... Common sense. Eighteen-years later, a dragon takes up residence on a mountain in the kingdom, demanding a princess to devour, or else it would turn its fiery-breath down on the kingdom. The court sees no alternative but to give up the Princess Bedelia to the dragon's appetite, but Princess Bedelia points-out that dragons couldn't tell the difference between her or anyone else. To defeat the dragon, Bedelia puts together a Guy with one of her stately gowns, with a core of gunpowder. At the Dragon's cave, Bedelia calls the dragon out and has the princess-Guy thrown down into its waiting gullet, and the dragon is killed when the gunpowder ignites inside of it.

News of Bedelia's defeat of a dragon brings her the unwanted attentions of Lord Garp, who rules the kingdom of Istven, (Arapathia's neighbor to the north), who comes with a procession of a century of courtiers, and many gifts, to ask King Ludwig for Princess Bedelia's hand in marriage. Repulsed by the old, ugly, deceitful, greedy and spoiled Lord Garp, but looking to avert a possible war, Bedelia invokes an old custom of a princess setting tasks to would-be suitors (à la Princess Kaguya), and gives him an impossible task, (hoping that Lord Garp would quit his suit); to bring her a branch from a living tree of gold and jewels, which is located 1500 km away and guarded by vicious beasts.

The conniving Lord Garp accepts, and just two weeks later returns with the branch, having apparently succeeded, but Bedelia catches on that the branch has no scent and thus is a fake, as the real tree is a living tree, despite being made of gold and jewels. Unashamed, Lord Garp insists he'll perform another task, and so this time Bedelia asks for a cloak made from hyde from the salamanders of a far-off volcano, the poisonous volcanic gases of which keep anyone or anything else from even coming within a mile of the volcano's base. A week later, Lord Garp returns with a resplendent cloak all of the colors of fire, but once again Garp has presented Bedelia with a fake and she catches-on, revealing it as such, as the cloak burns in an ordinary fire while the real salamanders live amongst much more powerful temperatures unharmed.

Enraged at being caught again, and Princess Bedelia once again refusing his suit, Lord Garp abducts her right then and there in broad daylight using magic, and locks her up in a cell in an isolated tower (à la Rapunzel), out in a remote location. Every day, Lord Garp comes and demands her hand in marriage, and each and every time Princess Bedelia refuses him. After a few days, Bedelia decides to try and find a way out herself, as there is no guarantee that she'll be found by anyone else; and in the tower finds three other cells, one of which is already occupied, and Bedelia helps her fellow prisoner, Prince Perian, the rightful ruler of the kingdom of Istven, break the curse of sleep (via counting sheep) that Lord Garp placed on him to usurp his throne.

Using Prince Perian's overgrown hair and beard to climb down the tower, Bedelia escapes, but no-sooner had Bedelia gotten down to the ground, Lord Garp, on his approach to the tower on horseback, sees all of this and, in a fit of unthinking anger, yanks Prince Perian down by his overgrown beard, only for Prince Perian to land on him, killing Lord Garp in the process. Bedelia and Perian ride to the Istven capital on the horse; Bedelia later marries Perian, but not before insisting that he have a haircut and shave to see what he really looked like before accepting his marriage proposal--"for she was always practical".

=== Stupid Marco ===
Prince Marco is the third and youngest son of the King and Queen of Lirripipe (à la The Three Brothers/Puss in Boots), and although a cheerful and goodhearted young man, Prince Marco is also not bright enough to tell his right side from his left; while he is not exactly stupid, he isn't exactly brilliant either, as princes are thought ought to be; while his two older brothers had both passed through their classes with flying colors, Prince Marco is more creative than intelligent, and would sit looking out of windows, daydreaming, and writing poetry, songs and stories, failing his classes when he should be paying attention.

Despite all of this, Prince Marco has a few great accomplishments to his person; firstly, he is very charismatic, so charming, polite, cheerful, goodhearted & pleasant a person that no-one could help but like him and want to help him, even if he is little slow-witted; secondly he could whistle very loudly; and thirdly he knows an infallible cure for the hiccups. When the time comes for Prince Marco to undergo his Quest (a Lirripipeian custom is for Lirripipeian princes to go out and seek out a princess to rescue and wed), his father tries to make it as easy as possible, having found out about a nearby princess, the Princess Aurelia, being held prisoner in a tower, and provides Prince Marco instructions on how to find her and rescue her (even writing "Right" & "Left" on the backs of his hands so he wouldn't get lost).

Prince Marco sets off the next morning. However, a rain shower on the way washes the ink off the backs of his hands, and when he reaches the fork in the road where he is to turn left, Prince Marco sees that the words on his hands are gone, and is left to guess which way is 'Left'; choosing 'Right', Prince Marco ends up traveling for days and ends up in the wrong kingdom, where a beautiful-but-bored maiden at a castle window informs him that she's never heard of a Princess Aurelia. Prince Marco realises that he went in the wrong direction, and the maiden, Sylvia, charmed by Marco, offers to help him, bringing her father's magical parrot automaton, which can answer any question.

The automaton informs them that the Princess Aurelia is imprisoned within the Green Glass Tower, located in the hills of the land of Gargovir, and directs them to a maiden named Roseanne, living in the nearby village of Dwindle for directions to the Green Glass Tower. Sylvia leads the way to Dwindle, whilst Marco entertains her with his poems, songs and stories. At the maiden Roseanne's house, who, after having saved the life of the good fairy, Melynda, was blessed with the gift of a gold piece for every word she speaks (à la Diamonds and Toads), is besieged with so much gold that it frequently traps her inside her cottage. Wanting to help, Marco offers to try his infallible hiccups cure, and at a loss, Roseanne agrees. The cure works, and Roseanne tells them what they came to learn (that the tower is 316 km away), advises them to see the local Necromancer, Fylfot, to borrow his magical seven-league boots (à la Jack the Giant Killer), and gives them cryptic advice on how to get Fylfot's help.

At the residence of Fylfot the Necromancer, he is unknowingly the victim of an invisible imp, keeping Fylfot's ears plugged up with its fingers. Unable to get Fylfot's attention, Marco whistles, so loudly in fact that it drives away the imp that none of them could see. Able to hear again, and feeling compelled to help Marco, Fylfot agrees to lend them his magic boots. He also warns them about the two-headed giant that is under orders to kill any young man that comes to its gates. Sylvia calculates how many steps/strides to take in the boots (as a league is 5 km, one footstep = one league, but a stride = 35 km), and 9 strides later, they are 1 km away from the tower. When the tower is within sight, Marco finds that he has lost his father's written instructions. Sylvia takes matters into her own hands and goes into the tower herself, reasoning that the giant is only under orders to kill any young man and she is a girl.

Inside the tower, Sylvia learns from the tower's caretaker that Princess Aurelia was just rescued the day before by a young man who had apparently found written instructions by the roadside which said to come by the tower's back door where there's no giant. Sylvia informs Marco, who now doesn't what to tell his father. Thoughtfully, Sylvia asks if it had to be Princess Aurelia he had to rescue or if any princess would do, and Marco explains that the custom is simply to rescue a princess. Sylvia reveals that she herself is in fact a princess, and that he has already rescued her from boredom; she'd been going stir-crazy back in her father's castle before Marco had arrived, and that she hasn't been bored since. Together, Prince Marco and Princess Sylvia make their way to Lirripipe.
