= Cameron Dokey =

American author (born 1956)

Cameron Dokey (born 1956) is an American author. She lives in Seattle, Washington with her three cats and her husband. Cameron was born in the Central Valley of California. Her father was a teacher of Philosophy, Creative Writing, and Western Literature, and perhaps for this reason, Cameron grew up reading classical literature and mythology. Both Cameron's parents are authors. Her mother's work is less well-known than that of her father. Cameron's grandmother, Mabel, was a singer on the radio in the early decades of the 20th century.

Cameron studied Archaeology at Sonoma State University just prior to extending her high school career as an actress by acting for several years at the Oregon Shakespeare Festival, in Ashland, Oregon. Cameron then moved to Seattle, where she continued acting at several locations including the Seattle Rep. It was in Seattle that Cameron met her husband, Jim Verdery.

After several years of acting and working in different capacities, Cameron has settled into writing.

== Works ==
=== Hearts and Dreams ===
- Katherine: Hearts and Dreams
- Charlotte: Heart of Hope
- Stephanie: Heart of Gold
- Carrie: Heart of Courage

=== Fear Street Saga novels ===
- The Sign of Fear
- Dance of Death
- Faces of Terror
- The Hand of Power
- The Raven Woman (Advertised but unpublished)

=== Buffy & Angel novels ===
- Here Be Monsters (Buffy novel)
- The Summoned (Angel novel)
- How I Survived My Summer Vacation (Buffy story anthology; two stories)

=== Charmed novels ===
- Haunted by Desire
- Truth and Consequences
- Picture Perfect

Once upon a Time

- The Storyteller's Daughter (A Retelling of The Arabian Nights)
- Beauty Sleep (A Retelling of Sleeping Beauty)
- Sunlight and Shadow (A Retelling of The Magic Flute)
- Golden (A Retelling of Rapunzel)
- Before Midnight (A Retelling of Cinderella)
- Belle (A Retelling of Beauty and the Beast)
- Wild Orchid (A Retelling of The Ballad of Mulan) (2009)
- Winter's Child (A Retelling of The Snow Queen)
- The World Above (A Retelling of Jack and the Beanstalk and Robin Hood)

=== Mystery Date Novels ===
- Love Me, Love Me Not
- Blue Moon
- Heart's Desire

=== The Blair Witch Files ===
- The Prisoner
- The Obsession

=== Other works ===
- How NOT to Spend Your Senior Year
- Forget Me Not (Mary-Kate and Ashley Sweet 16 series 17)
- Hindenburg, 1937
- The Talisman
- Washington Avalanche, 1910
- Together Forever
