= Hua Mulan =

Legendary heroine

Hua Mulan 花木蘭
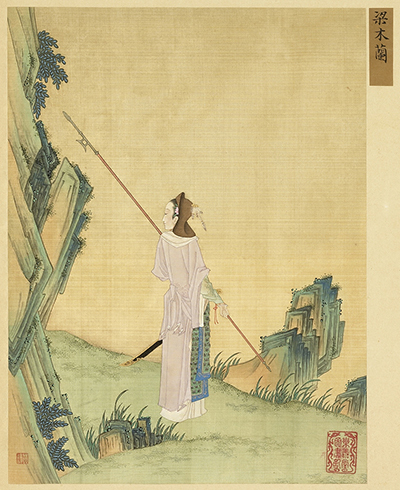
- Mulan as depicted in the album Gathering Gems of Beauty (畫麗珠萃秀); ca 18th century.
- First appearance: Ballad of Mulan; c. 6th century

In-universe information
- Gender: Female
- Occupation: Cavalry soldier
- Origin: Northern Wei regime

Hua Mulan
- Traditional Chinese: 花木蘭
- Simplified Chinese: 花木兰
Transcriptions
Standard Mandarin
- Hanyu Pinyin: Huā Mùlán
- Gwoyeu Romatzyh: Hua Muhlan
- Wade–Giles: Hua^{1} Mu^{4}-lan^{2}
- Yale Romanization: Hwā Mùlán
- IPA: [xwá mû.lǎn]
Gan
- Romanization: Fa^{1} Muk^{6}-lan^{4}
Hakka
- Romanization: Fa Muklan
Yue: Cantonese
- Yale Romanization: Fā Muhk-làahn
- Jyutping: Faa1 Muk6laan4
- IPA: [fa˥ mʊk̚˨lan˩]
Southern Min
- Hokkien POJ: Hoa Bo̍k-lân
- Tâi-lô: Hua Bo̍k-lân
Middle Chinese
- Middle Chinese: Hwæ Muk-lan
Old Chinese
- Baxter–Sagart (2014): *qʷʰˤra C.mˤok-k.rˤan

Hua Mulan (traditional Chinese: 花木蘭; simplified Chinese: 花木兰; pinyin: Huā Mùlán) is a legendary folk heroine from the Northern and Southern dynasties era (4th to 6th century CE) of Chinese history. Hua Mulan is depicted in the Wu Shuang Pu (無雙譜, Table of Peerless Heroes) by Jin Guliang.

== Overview ==
According to legend, Mulan took her aged father's place in the conscription for the army by disguising herself as a man, as there were no other male relatives of-age in her family. In the story, after prolonged and distinguished military service against nomadic barbarian tribes beyond the northern frontier, Mulan is honored by the emperor, but she declines a position of high office, asking only for a horse for her return home. She retires to her hometown, where she is reunited with her family and, much to the astonishment of her comrades, reveals herself as a woman after 12 years of traveling together.

== First mentions ==
The first known written record of Mulan is the Ballad of Mulan, (Note: Ballad of Mulan: traditional Chinese: 木蘭辭; simplified Chinese: 木兰辞; pinyin: Mùlán cí; Wade–Giles: Mu-lan tz'u) a folk song believed to have been composed during the Northern Wei regime (386–535 CE) and included in an anthology of books and songs during the Southern Chen dynasty (557–589 CE). While this anthology is itself lost, significant excerpts, including the Ballad of Mulan, survive in the Song dynasty anthology Yuefu Shiji (Chinese: 樂府詩集). (Note: Chinese Wikisource has original text related to this article: 乐府诗集)

The historical setting of the Ballad of Mulan is usually the Northern Wei's military campaigns against the nomadic Rouran. A later adaptation has Mulan active around the founding of the Tang dynasty (c. 620 CE).

The story of Mulan was taken up in a number of later works, including the 17th-century work of historical fiction Romance of Sui and Tang, (Note: Romance of Sui and Tang: 隋唐演義; 隋唐演义; Suí Táng Yǎnyì; Sui T'ang Yen-i) and many screen and stage adaptations.

== Sources ==
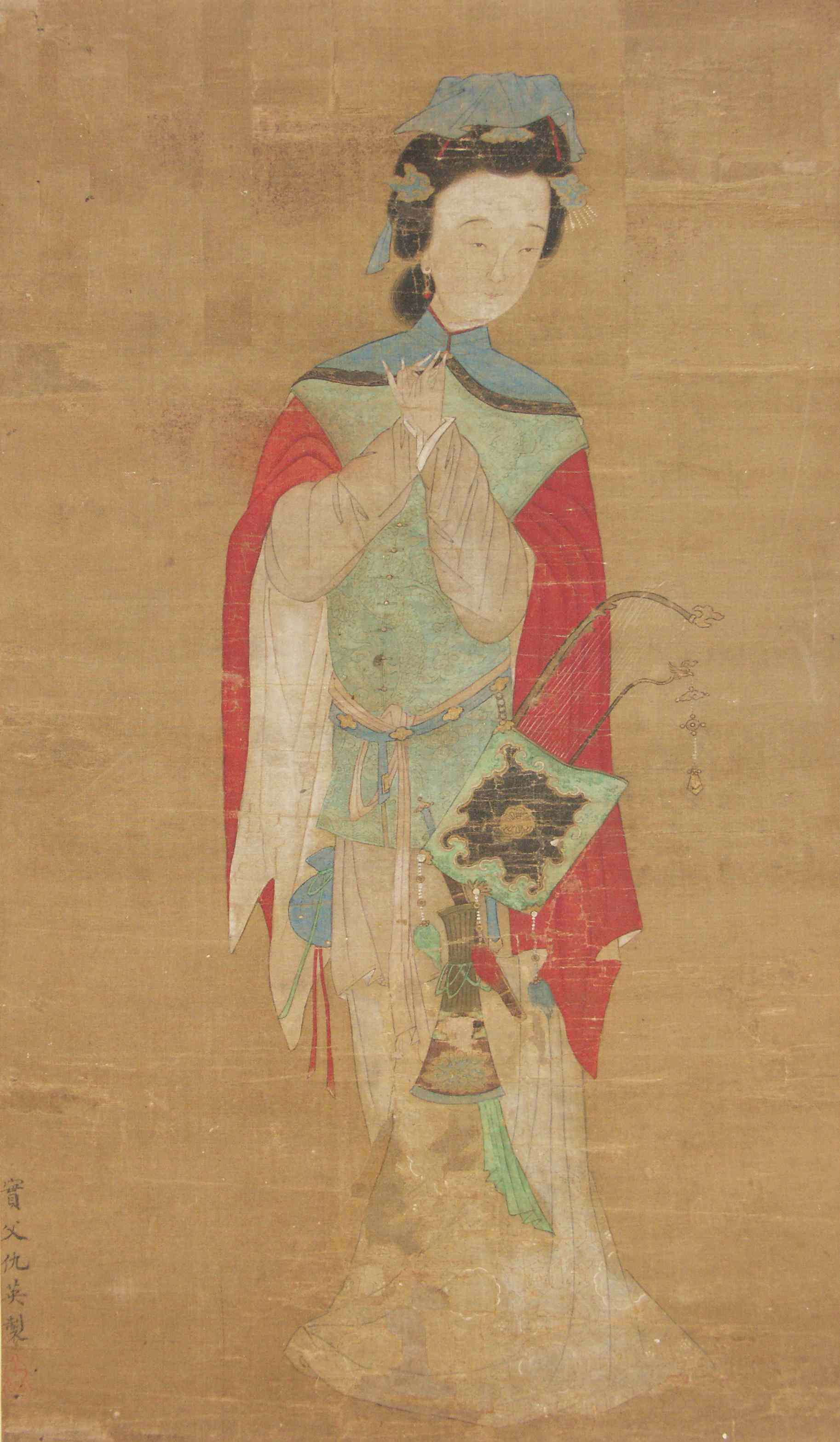
Painting of Hua Mulan, 18th century, housed in the British Museum.

The Ballad of Mulan was first transcribed in the Musical Records of Old and New, (Note: Musical Records of Old and New: 古今樂錄; 古今乐录; Gǔjīn Yuèlù; Ku-chin Yüeh-lu) a compilation of books and songs by the monk Zhijiang in the Southern Chen dynasty in the 6th century. The earliest extant text of the poem comes from an 11th- or 12th-century anthology known as the Music Bureau Collection, (Note: Music Bureau Collection: 樂府詩集; 乐府诗集; Yuèfǔshījí; Yüeh-fu-shih-chi) whose author, Guo Maoqian, explicitly mentions the Musical Records of Old and New as his source for the poem.

An adaptation by playwright Xu Wei (d. 1593) dramatized the tale as "The Female Mulan" (Note: "The Female Mulan": 雌木蘭; 雌木兰; Cí Mùlán; Tz'u Mu-lan) or, more fully, "The Heroine Mulan Goes to War in Her Father's Place", (Note: "The Heroine Mulan Goes to War in Her Father's Place": 雌木蘭替父從軍; 雌木兰替父从军; Cí Mùlán Tì Fù Cóngjūn; Tz'u Mu-lan T'i Fu Ts'ung-chün) in two acts. Later, the character of Mulan was incorporated into the Romance of Sui and Tang, a novel written by Chu Renhuo (褚人獲).

Over time, the story of Mulan rose in popularity as a folk tale among the Chinese people.

=== Name ===
The heroine of the poem is given different family names in different versions of her story. The Musical Records of Old and New states Mulan's given name is not known and therefore implies Mulan is her surname. As the Ballad of Mulan is set in the Northern Wei dynasty when northern China was ruled by ethnic Xianbei, a proto-Mongolic people, there is some evidence that Mulan was not ethnic Han Chinese but Xianbei, who had exclusively compound surnames. Mulan may have been the sinified version of the Xianbei word "umran" which means prosperous.

According to later books such as Female Mulan, her family name is Zhu (朱), while the Romance of Sui and Tang says it is Wei (魏). The family name Hua (花; Huā; 'flower'), which was introduced by Xu Wei, has become the most popular in recent years, in part because of its more poetic meaning and association with the given name "Mulan" (木蘭), which literally means "lily magnolia".

=== Historicity ===
Mulan's name is included in Yan Xiyuan's One Hundred Beauties, which describes a number of women from Chinese folklore. It is still unclear whether Mulan was a historical person or just a legend, as her name does not appear in Exemplary Women, a collection of biographies of women who lived during Northern Wei dynasty.

Although The Ballad of Mulan itself does not expressly indicate the historical setting, the story is commonly attributed to the Northern Wei dynasty due to geographic and cultural references in the ballad. The Northern Wei dynasty was founded by the Tuoba clan of ethnic Xianbei who united northern China in the 4th century CE (Conquest dynasty). The Tuoba Xianbei rulers were themselves nomads from the northern steppes and became sinified as they ruled and settled in northern China. The Tuoba Xianbei took on the Chinese dynasty name "Wei", changed their own surname from "Tuoba" to "Yuan", and moved the capital from Pingcheng, modern-day Datong, Shanxi in the northern periphery of Imperial China, to Luoyang, south of the Yellow River, in the Central Plain, the traditional heartland of China. The emperors of the Northern Wei were known both by the sacred Chinese title, "Son of Heaven", and by "Khagan", the title of the leader of nomadic kingdoms. The Ballad of Mulan refers to the sovereign by both titles. The Northern Wei also adopted the governing institutions of Imperial China, and the office of shangshulang (尚書郎) the Khagan offered Mulan is a ministerial position within the shangshusheng (尚書省), the highest organ of executive power under the emperor. This offering indicates Mulan was trained in the martial arts and literary arts as she was capable of serving as a civilian official charged with issuing and interpreting written government orders.

The Xianbei in China also retained certain nomadic traditions, and Xianbei women were typically skilled horseback riders. Another popular Northern Wei folk poem called "Li Bo's Younger Sister" praises Yong Rong, Li Bo's younger sister, for her riding and archery skills. The Ballad of Mulan may have reflected the gender roles and status of women in nomadic societies.

The Northern Wei was engaged in protracted military conflict with the nomadic Rouran, who frequently raided the northern Chinese frontier to loot and pillage. Northern Wei emperors considered the Rouran to be uncivilized "barbarians" and called them Ruanruan (Chinese: 蠕蠕) or "wriggling worms". According to the Book of Wei, the dynasty's official history, Emperor Taiwu of Northern Wei launched a military expedition in 429 against the Rouran by advancing on the Black Mountain and then extending northward to the Yanran Mountain. Both locations are cited in The Ballad. The Black Mountain corresponds to Shahu Mountain (殺虎山), located southeast of modern-day Hohhot in Inner Mongolia. Yan Mountain, the shorthand for Yanran Mountain (燕然山), is now known as the Khangai Mountains of central Mongolia.

The Northern Wei sought to protect the frontier by establishing a string of frontier garrison commands across what is today Inner Mongolia.

== Ballad of Mulan ==
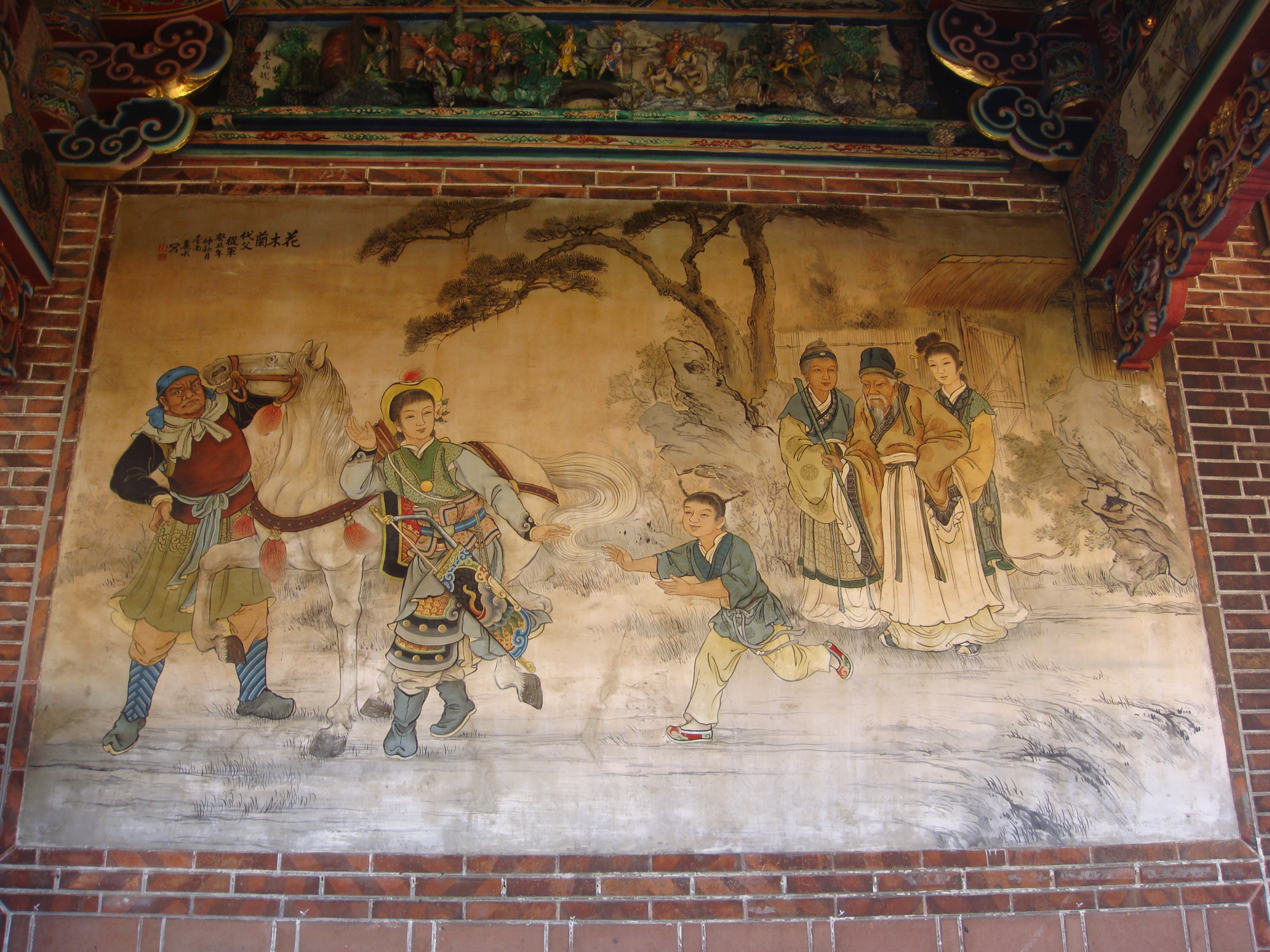
Mural of Hua Mulan enlisting; in the Dalongdong Baoan Temple in Taipei, Taiwan.

Mulan sighs at her loom. The Khan is mobilizing the military, and her father is named in most conscription notices from the emperor. As the eldest child, she decides to take her father's place. She buys a fine horse from the eastern market, saddle and stirrup from the western market, bridle and reins from the southern market and a long whip from the northern market.

She bids farewell to her parents in the morning and leaves for the Black Mountain, encamping by the Yellow River in the evening, where she cannot hear the calls of her parents due to the rushing waters; only the sounds of the barbarians' cavalry in the Yan Mountains. She advances ten thousand li to battle as if flying past the mountains. The sound of the sentry gong cuts through the cold night air, and the moonlight reflects off her metal armor. A hundred battles take place, and generals die.

After the ten-year campaign, the veterans return to meet the Son of Heaven (Mandate of Heaven), enthroned in the splendid palace, who confers promotions in rank and prizes of hundreds of thousands. He asks Mulan what she would like. Mulan turns down the high-ranking position of shangshulang in the central government, and asks only for a swift mount to take her back home.

Her parents, upon hearing her return, welcome her outside their hometown. Her elder sister puts on her fine dress. Her younger brother sharpens the knife for the swine and sheep. Mulan returns to her room, changes from her tabard into her old clothes. She combs her hair by the window and, before the mirror, fastens golden yellow flowers. Her comrades are shocked to see her. For twelve years of their enlistment together, they hadn't realized that she was a woman. Mulan responds with:

The male hare has heavy front paws.
The female hare tends to squint.
But when the two hares run side by side,
How can you tell the female from the male?

Translation:

雄兔腳撲朔
雌兔眼迷離
雙兔傍地走
安能辨我是雄雌？

== Romance of Sui and Tang ==
Chu Renhuo's Romance of the Sui and Tang (c. 1675) provides additional backdrops and plot-twists. Here, Mulan lives under the rule of Heshana Khan of the Western Turkic Khaganate. When the Khan agrees to wage war in alliance with the emergent Tang dynasty, which was poised to conquer all of China, Mulan's father Hua Hu (Chinese: 花弧) fears he will be conscripted into military service since he only has two daughters and an infant son. Mulan crossdresses as a man and enlists in her father's stead. She is intercepted by the forces of the Xia king Dou Jiande and is brought under questioning by the king's warrior daughter Xianniang (Chinese: 線娘), who tries to recruit Mulan as a man. Discovering Mulan to be a fellow female warrior, she is so delighted that they become sworn sisters.

In the Sui Tang Romance, Mulan comes to a tragic end, a "detail that cannot be found in any previous legends or stories associated Hua Mulan", and believed to have been interpolated by the author Chu Renho. Xianniang's father is vanquished after siding with the enemy of the Tang dynasty, and the two sworn sisters, with knives in their mouths, surrender themselves to be executed in the place of the condemned man. This act of filial piety wins a reprieve from Emperor Taizong of Tang, and the imperial consort, who was birth-mother to the Emperor, bestows money to Mulan to provide for her parents, as well as wedding funds for the princess, who had confessed to having promised herself to general Luó Chéng (Chinese: 羅成). In reality, Dou Jiande was executed, but in the novel he lives on as a monk.

Mulan is given leave to journey back to her homeland, and once arrangements were made for Mulan's parents to relocate, it is expected that they will all be living in the princess's old capital of Leshou (Chinese: 樂壽, modern Xian County, Hebei). Mulan is devastated to discover her father has long died and her mother has remarried. According to the novel, Mulan's mother was surnamed Yuan (袁) and remarried a man named Wei (魏). Even worse, the Khan has summoned her to the palace to become his concubine.

Rather than to suffer this fate, she dies by suicide. But before she dies, she entrusts an errand to her younger sister, Youlan (Chinese: 又蘭), which was to deliver Xianniang's letter to her fiancé, Luó Chéng. This younger sister dresses as a man to make her delivery, but her disguise is discovered, and it arouses her recipient's amorous attention.

The Mulan character's suicide has been described as "baffling", since she is not in love or engaged to anyone. Some commentators have explained this as an anti-Qing message: the author supposedly wanted to suggest that "even a half-Chinese woman would prefer death by her own hand to serving a foreign ruler". In the novel, Mulan's mother was from the Central Plain of China, but her father was from Hebei during the Northern Wei dynasty and presumably of Xianbei origin.

== Modern adaptations ==
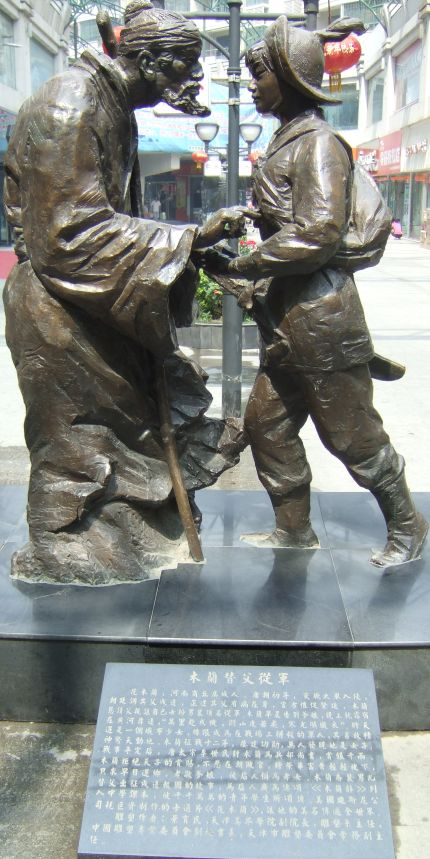
Statue of Mulan being welcomed home, in the city of Xinxiang, China

The story of Hua Mulan has inspired a number of screen and stage adaptations.

During the Second-Sino Japanese War, Hua Mulan became a major symbol in cultural works like spoken word dramas as a symbol of unity and resistance to Japan's aggression.

=== Stage ===
- Mulan Joins the Army (1917 play) starring Mei Lanfang
- Mulan Jr., a one-act stage musical based on the 1998 Disney animated film Mulan
- The Legend of Marissa Inouye (2013 dance production) by the Hong Kong Dance Company
- The Ballad of Mulan, Red Dragonfly Productions, UK

=== Films ===
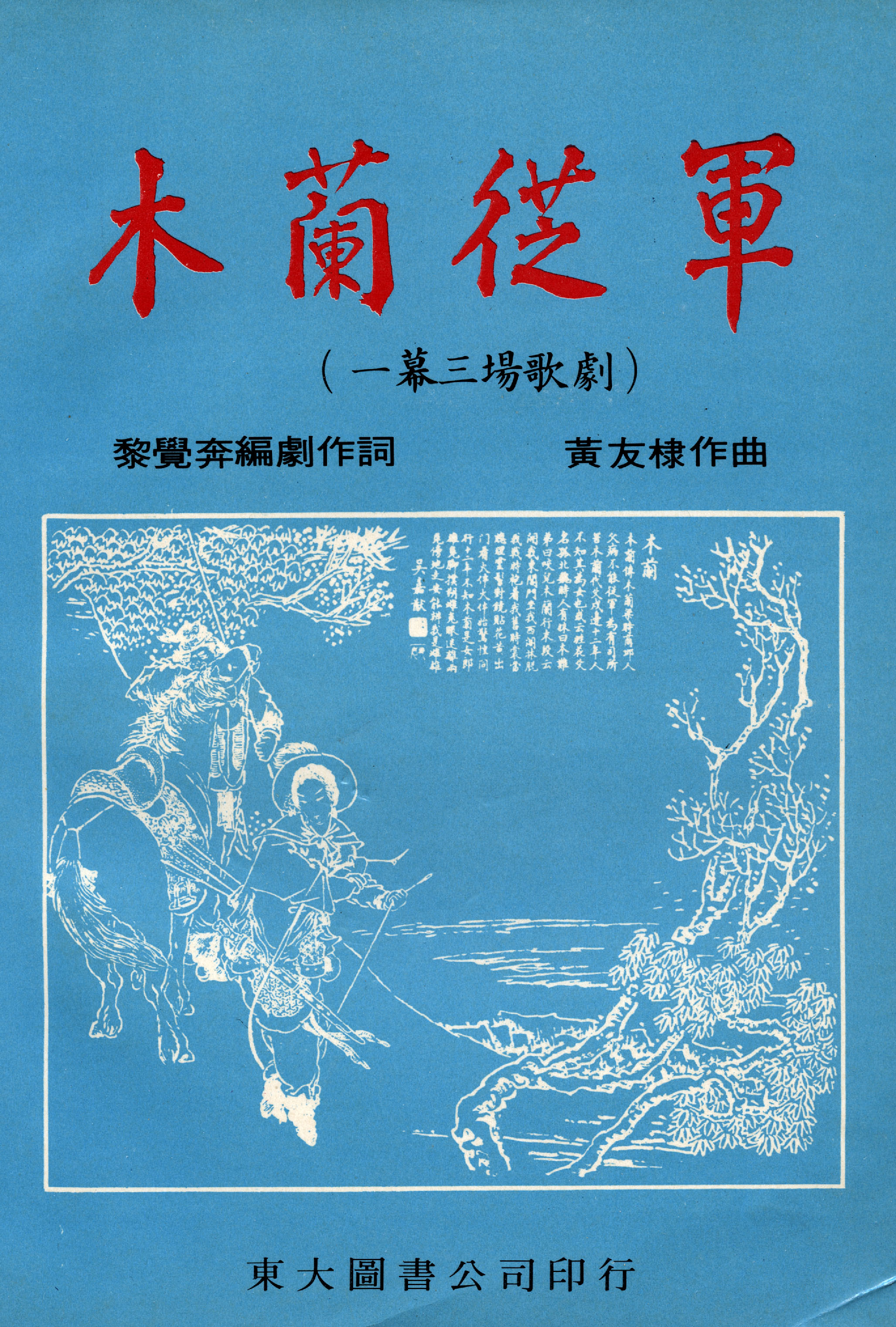
Mulan Joins the Army songbook, Hong Kong, early 1960s

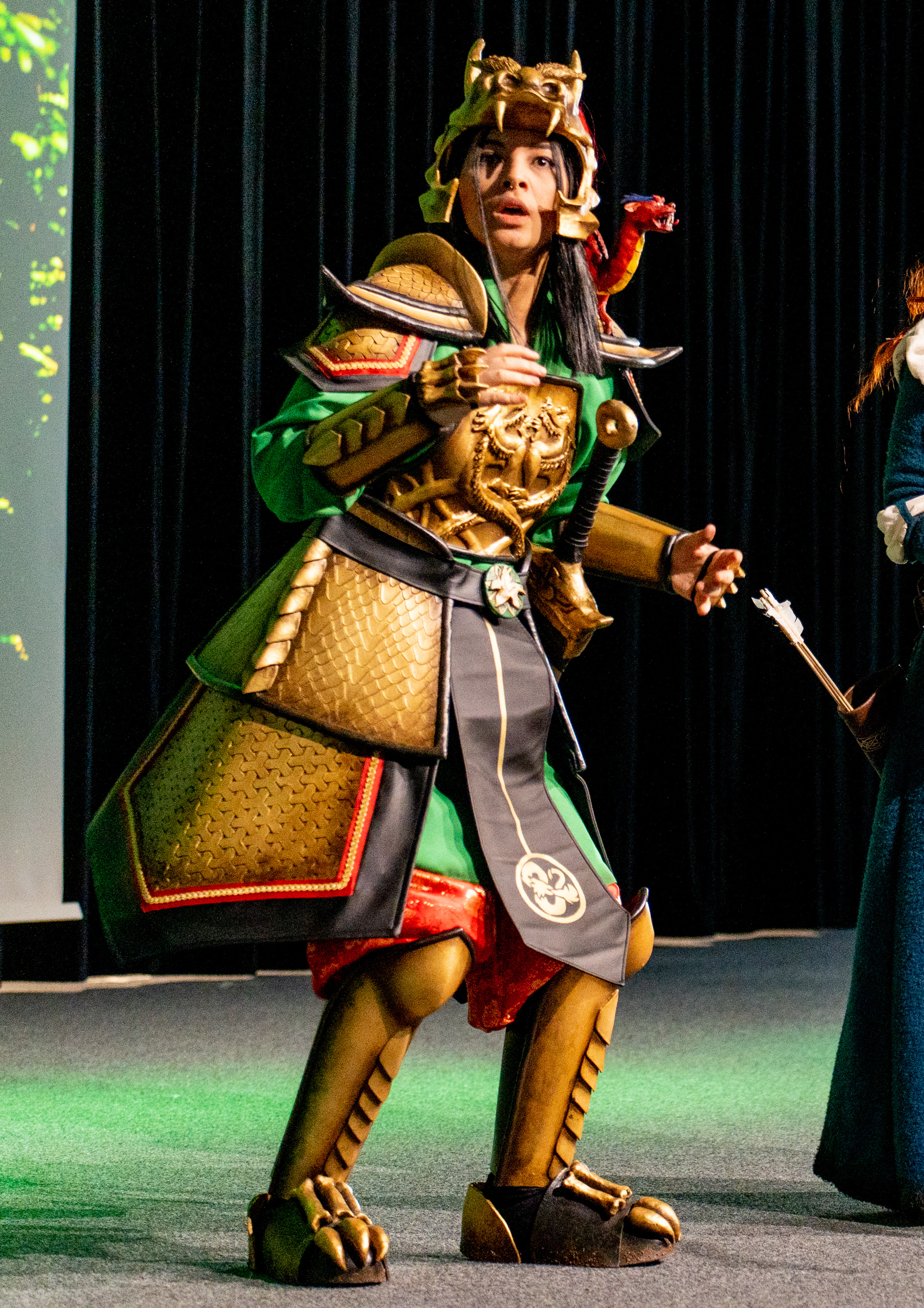
Mulan (Disney character) cosplay at the Japan Impact festival 2023 (Switzerland).

- Hua Mulan Joins the Army (1927 film) – a silent film released by Tianyi Film Company and directed by Li Pingqian.
- Mulan Joins the Army (1928 film) – Mingxing Film Company production, directed by Hou Yao. The film was unsuccessful, in part due to the Tianyi film that was released the previous year.
- Mulan Joins the Army (1939 film) (original English title Hua Mu Lan), – Chinese film made during the Second Sino-Japanese War, directed by Bu Wancang and written by Ouyang Yuqian. The film also created a large spark of popularity, in terms of literature.
- Hua Mulan (1951 film) - Yueju opera film starring Yam Kim-fai
- New Mulan Joins the Army (1953 film) - Yueju opera film starring Yu So-chow
- Hua Mulan (1956 film) - Yuju opera film starring Chang Xiangyu
- Lady General Hua Mu-lan (1964 film) – Hong Kong Huangmeixi opera film starring Ling Po
- Mulan Joins the Army (1961 film) - Yueju opera film starring Tang Bik-wan
- New Mulan Joins the Army (1964 film) - Yueju opera film starring Fung Wong Nui
- Saga of Mulan (1994 film) – Film adaptation of the Longjiangju xiqu opera based on the legend.
- Mulan (1998 film) – A Disney animated feature, and the basis of many derivative works by Disney. The Mulan character, named Fa Mulan, has appeared in other media and promotions, usually as part of the Disney Princess product line.
  - Mulan II (2004 film) – A direct-to-video animated sequel.
  - Mulan (2020 film) – A live action remake.
- Mulan, Rise of a Warrior (2009 film) – Chinese live action film.
- Matchless Mulan (无双花木兰) (2020 film) – Chinese live action film.
- Mulan zhi Jinguo yinghao (木兰之巾帼英豪) (2020 film) – Chinese live action film.
- Hua Mulan (花木兰) (2020 film) – Chinese live action film starring Liu Chuxian (刘楚玄) as the leading actress.
- Kung Fu Mulan (木兰：横空出世) (2020 film) – Chinese CGI animation film.
- Mulan Legend (花木兰之大漠营救) (2020 film) – Chinese live action film.
- The Legend of Mulan (1998 film) – Dutch animated film.

=== Television series ===
- A Tough Side of a Lady (1998 series) – Hong Kong TVB drama series of Mulan starring Mariane Chan as Hua Mulan.
- Hua Mu Lan (1999 series) – Taiwan CTV period drama serial starring Anita Yuen as Hua Mulan.
- Jamie Chung portrays Mulan in the second, third and fifth seasons of the U.S. TV series Once Upon a Time (2012–2013), this iteration is loosely based on the Disney portrayal.
- Mu Lan (巾幗大將軍) (2012) – China production with Elanne Kong starring as Mu Lan
- The Legend of Hua Mulan (花木蘭傳奇) (2013) – CCTV production starring Hou Meng Yao, Dylan Kuo, Liu De Kai, Ray Lui, Dai Chunrong and Angel Wang. It consists of forty-nine episodes.
- Star of Tomorrow: Hua Mulan (小戏骨：花木兰) (2015) – a Hunan TV children's program which features all-child casts performing classic Chinese tales, produced a two-part adaptation of Hua Mulan in 2017, based largely on the Disney film and featuring Chinese versions of well-known songs from Mulan and other Disney films.
- In Rooster Teeth web series RWBY, Mulan is reimagined as a young male named Lie Ren. All of the members of his team are based on legendary figures who dressed as the opposite sex in their stories.

=== Literature ===
- Maxine Hong Kingston revisited Mulan's tale in her 1975 The Woman Warrior. Kingston's version popularized the story in the West and may have led to the Disney animated feature adaptation.
- The Legend of Mu Lan: A Heroine of Ancient China was the first English language picture book featuring the character Mulan published in the United States in 1992 by Victory Press.
- In the fantasy/alternate history novel Throne of Jade (2006), China's aerial corps is described as being composed of all female captains and their dragons due to the precedent set by the legendary woman warrior.
- Cameron Dokey created Wild Orchid in 2009, a retelling of the Ballad of Mulan as part of the Once Upon A Time series of novels published by Simon Pulse, an imprint of Simon & Schuster.
- In the comics, Deadpool Killustrated (2013), Hua Mulan, along with Natty Bumppo and Beowulf, is brought together by Sherlock Holmes and Dr. Watson (using H. G. Wells's time machine) to stop Deadpool from killing all beloved literary characters and destroying the literary universe.
- Reflection by Elizabeth Lim was published in 2018 as an installment in Disney Press' Twisted Tales series. This is an alternate ending to the Disney film in which Mulan must travel to Diyu, the Underworld, to save her captain.
- In The Magnolia Sword: A Ballad of Mulan by Sherry Thomas (2019), Mulan has trained in the martial arts since childhood in preparation for a hereditary duel. When she goes to war in her father's stead, she is shocked to discover her team's captain is also her opponent in the duel.
- Mulan: Before the Sword, written by Grace Lin (2020) and published by Disney Press, is written as a prequel to the Disney live action movie released in the same year.
- The Dragon Spirit Duology, written by K.X. Song, is a dark retelling of the original legend following a young woman named Meilin who disguises herself as a man to enlist in the army and escape her oppressive life.

==== Children's books ====
- Wuloom Family (episode 5) – Chinese manhua series by Au Yao-Hsing
- The Ballad of Mulan (1998) by Song Nan Zhang – in English
- Fa Mulan: The Story of a Woman Warrior (1998) by Robert D. San Souci, illustrated by Jean Tseng and Mou-Sien Tseng
- I am Hua Mulan, by Qin Wenjun, illust. Yu Rong (2017) – in Chinese
- Mulan: The Legend of the Woman Warrior, by Faye-Lynn Wu, illustrated by Joy Ang (2019)

=== Video games ===
- Kingdom Hearts II – Mulan is an optional party member in the Land of Dragons. Note that this is the Disney version of the character.
- Smite – Mulan is a playable character
- Romance of the Three Kingdoms XIV – Mulan is an unlockable Legendary officer that can be added at the beginning of new scenarios in the game.
- Civilization VI – Mulan is a summonable hero in the Heroes and Legends game mode
- Goddess of Genesis – Mulan is a summonable hero through the game's gacha mechanism
- Mulan – Mulan video game from 1998, based on the Disney iteration, playable on a Game Boy.
- Mulan is a playable character in the Mobile/PC Game Rise of Kingdoms.

== Tribute in astronomy ==
The Hua Mulan crater on Venus is named for her.

== See also ==
- Han E – Chinese war heroine
- List of women warriors in folklore
- Milunka Savić – Serbian war heroine
- Valentina Ramírez Avitia – Mexican revolutionary (1893–1979)
- Wartime cross-dressers
- Women warriors – Archetypal figure
- Yuefu – Chinese poetic form
