= Against the Day =

2006 novel by Thomas Pynchon

- First edition cover
- Author: Thomas Pynchon
- Language: English
- Genre: Historical novel
- Published: November 21, 2006 (Penguin Press)
- Publication place: United States
- Media type: Print (hardcover)
- Pages: 1,085 pp
- ISBN: 1-59420-120-X
- OCLC: 71173932
- Dewey Decimal: 813/.54 22
- LC Class: PS3566.Y55 A73 2006

Against the Day is an epic historical novel by Thomas Pynchon, published on November 21, 2006. The narrative takes place between the 1893 Chicago World's Fair and the time immediately following World War I and features more than 280 characters spread across the United States, Europe, Mexico, Central Asia, Africa and, according to the book jacket blurb written by Pynchon, "one or two places not strictly speaking on the map at all." Like its predecessors, Against the Day is an example of historiographic metafiction or metahistorical romance. At 1,085 pages, it is the longest of Pynchon's novels to date.

== Title ==
Besides appearing within the book itself, the novel's title apparently refers to a verse in the Bible (2 Peter 3:7) reading "the heavens and the earth ... [are] reserved unto fire against the day of judgment and perdition of ungodly men." Another possibility is from Job: "Hast thou entered into the treasure of the snow? or hast thou seen the treasures of the hail, which I have reserved against the time of trouble, against the day of battle and war?" (38:22–23).

William Faulkner, whose diction frequently echoes the King James Bible, liked the phrase, and many reviewers have traced it to a speech of Faulkner's against racism. Perhaps as relevant is a passage in Absalom, Absalom! in which Sutpen, a Faustus character of the sort that Pynchon deploys everywhere, seeks "a wife who not only would consolidate the hiding but could would and did breed him two children to fend and shield both in themselves and in their progeny the brittle bones and tired flesh of an old man against the day when the Creditor would run him to earth for the last time and he couldn't get away". The Creditor there is Mephistopheles, to whom Faustus/Sutpen would owe his soul. (The passage in Gravity's Rainbow about the "black indomitable oven" with which the witch-like Blicero, another Faustus character, is left once the Hansel-and-Gretel-like children have departed, alludes to another passage in Absalom, Absalom!.)

Nonliterary sources for the title may also exist: Contre-jour (literally "against [the] day"), a term in photography referring to backlighting. There are also two uses of the phrase "against the day" in Pynchon's Mason & Dixon, and four appearances in William Gaddis's J R.

== Speculation before publication ==
As Pynchon researched and wrote the book, a variety of rumors about it circulated over the years. One of the most salient reports came from the former German minister of culture, and before that, the publisher of Henry Holt and Company, Michael Naumann, who said he assisted Pynchon in researching "a Russian mathematician [who] studied for David Hilbert in Göttingen", and that the new novel would trace the life and loves of mathematician and academic Sofia Kovalevskaya. Kovalevskaya briefly appears in the book, but Pynchon may have partly modeled the major character Yashmeen Halfcourt after her.

=== Author's synopsis/book jacket copy ===
In mid-July 2006, a plot synopsis signed by Pynchon himself appeared on Amazon.com's page for the novel, only to vanish a few days later. Readers who had noticed the synopsis re-posted it. This disappearance provoked speculation on blogs and the PYNCHON-L mailing list about publicity stunts and viral marketing schemes. Shortly thereafter, Slate published a brief article revealing that the blurb's early appearance was a mistake on the part of the publisher, Penguin Press. Associated Press indicated the title of the previously anonymous novel.

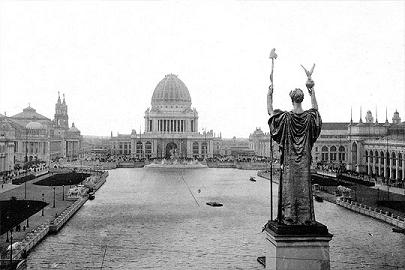
1893 Chicago World's Fair

Pynchon's synopsis states that the novel's action takes place "between the 1893 Chicago World's Fair and the years just after World War I". "With a worldwide disaster looming just a few years ahead, it is a time of unrestrained corporate greed, false religiosity, moronic fecklessness, and evil intent in high places. No reference to the present day is intended or should be inferred." Pynchon promises "cameo appearances by Nikola Tesla, Bela Lugosi and Groucho Marx", as well as "stupid songs" and "strange sexual practices".

The novel's setting

"moves from the labor troubles in Colorado to turn-of-the-century New York City, to London and Göttingen, Venice and Vienna, the Balkans, Central Asia, Siberia at the time of the mysterious Tunguska Event, Mexico during the Revolution, postwar Paris, silent-era Hollywood, and one or two places not strictly speaking on the map at all."

Like several of Pynchon's earlier works, Against the Day includes both mathematicians and drug users. "As an era of certainty comes crashing down around their ears and unpredictable future commences, these folks are mostly just trying to pursue their lives. Sometimes they manage to catch up; sometimes it's their lives that pursue them."

The synopsis concludes:

If it is not the world, it is what the world might be with a minor adjustment or two. According to some, this is one of the main purposes of fiction.

Let the reader decide, let the reader beware. Good luck.

The published jacket-flap of the book featured an edited-down version of this text, omitting the last three sentences, references to specific authorship (as well as misspelling Nikola Tesla's first name as "Nikolai"; Pynchon had previously spelled it correctly).

== Plot summary ==
Nearly all reviewers of the book mention the byzantine nature of the plot. Louis Menand in The New Yorker gives a simple description:

"[T]his is the plot: An anarchist named Webb Traverse, who employs dynamite as a weapon against the mining and railroad interests out West, is killed by two gunmen, [...] who were hired by the wicked arch-plutocrat Scarsdale Vibe. Traverse's sons [...] set out to avenge their father's murder. [...] Of course, there are a zillion other things going on in Against the Day, but the Traverse-family revenge drama is the only one that resembles a plot [...] that is, in Aristotle's helpful definition, an action that has a beginning, a middle, and an end. The rest of the novel is shapeless [...]"

As to the multitude of plot dead-ends, pauses and confusing episodes that return to continue much later in the narrative, Menand writes:

"[T]he text exceeds our ability to keep everything in our heads, to take it all in at once. There is too much going on among too many characters in too many places. [...] This [including tone shifts in which Pynchon spoofs various styles of popular literature] was all surely part of the intention, a simulation of the disorienting overload of modern culture."

== Principal characters ==
=== In alphabetical order by last name ===
- Lew Basnight, a "Psychical Detective" from Chicago
- Estrella Briggs, a young pregnant woman found in Nochecita (ATD, p. 200)
- The Chums of Chance (the crew of the skyship Inconvenience):
  - Miles Blundell, the handyman apprentice and jocular cook, who is gifted with mysterious visions and seemingly extrasensory perception
  - Chick Counterfly, scientific officer and newest member of the crew
  - Lindsay Noseworth, second-in-command, "Master-At-Arms, in charge of discipline aboard the ship" (ATD, p. 4)
  - Pugnax, a dog rescued from a fight in Washington, D.C. by the Chums of Chance, he reads and can communicate with humans via "Rff-rff" sounds.
  - Randolph St. Cosmo, ship commander (ATD, p. 3)
  - Darby Suckling, "baby" of the crew, (ATD, p. 3) and later legal-officer of the ship.
- Ruperta Chirpingden-Groin, aristocratic English traveler
- Archduke Franz Ferdinand, who appears as a troublemaking young man attending the Chicago World's Fair
- Sloat Fresno, one of the murderers of Webb Traverse, along with Deuce Kindred
- Rao V. Ganeshi, academic from India
- Stilton Gaspereaux, "a scholarly adventurer in the Inner Asian tradition of Sven Hedin."
- Yashmeen Halfcourt, "the stunningly beautiful ward of a British diplomat in Central Asia", and "polymorphous mathematical prodigy", ward of the T.W.I.T., entrusted to the group by her adopted father, Colonel Halfcourt
- Kieselguhr Kid, freedom-fighter/terrorist. A gun fighter who uses dynamite instead of guns in direct action against the mine owners (the original recipe for dynamite involved mixing nitroglycerin with Kieselguhr — porous dirt containing silica)
- Deuce Kindred, one of the murderers of Webb Traverse, along with Sloat Fresno
- Cyprian Latewood, "a homosexual twit possibly modeled on Evelyn Waugh's Sebastian Flyte"
- Al Mar-Faud, a minor character who mispronounces his Rs as Ws (rhotacism) (homonym for Elmer Fudd of Bugs Bunny fame)
- Mouffette, the name of a papillon lap-dog (mouffette in French = "skunk")
- Igor Padzhitnoff, Russian captain of the airship Bol'shaia Igra and member of the Tovarishchi Slutchainyi (the Russian counterpart to the Chums of Chance)
- Hunter Penhallow, son of Constance Penhallow who goes to the U.S. with the Vormance expedition
- Professor Renfrew, British professor with a bitter personal rivalry with one Professor Werfner ("Renfrew" spelled backwards)
- The Rideouts:
  - Dahlia (or "Dally") Rideout, Merle Rideout's (adoptive) daughter
  - Erlys Rideout, Merle Rideout's ex-wife, who has run off with Luca Zombini, a magician
  - Merle Rideout, an itinerant photographer and scientific inventor
- Captain Sands, inspector in London
- Lionel Swome, T.W.I.T. (see below)
- Nikola Tesla, the celebrated Serbian inventor and investigator of electrical phenomena, rival of Thomas Edison
- The Traverses:
  - Frank Traverse, an engineer; son of Webb and brother of Reef, Kit and Lake
  - Kit Traverse, youngest son of Webb and brother of Frank, Reef and Lake; he studies mathematics at Yale (and studies with the physicist Willard Gibbs, whose work is preparing the way for 20th-century thermodynamics) and at Göttingen
  - Lake Traverse, daughter of Webb and sister of Frank, Reef, and Kit. Became Lake Kindred after marrying Deuce Kindred.
  - Mayva Traverse, wife of Webb and mother of his children
  - Reef Traverse, a cardsharp; son of Webb and brother of Frank, Kit and Lake
  - Webb Traverse, "a turn-of-the-century ... miner" and "an anarchist familiar with dynamite, and he might or might not be the elusive mad bomber who destroys railroad bridges and other mine property"; father of Frank, Reef, Kit and Lake; killed by Sloat Fresno and Deuce Kindred
- Trespassers, "who appear to be dead people from the future"
- Miss Umeki Tsurigane, a Quaternion theorist who was educated at the Imperial University of Japan (ATD, p. 531)
- Professor Heino Vanderjuice of Yale University, associate of the Chums of Chance,
- The Vibes:
  - Colfax Vibe
  - Cragmont Vibe
  - Dittany Vibe
  - Edwarda Vibe, née Beef,
  - Fleetwood Vibe
  - Scarsdale Vibe, "the most ruthless of the mine owners"
  - R. Wilshire Vibe, a theater producer and Scarsdale's brother
- Foley Walker, Scarsdale Vibe's special assistant, who took Scarsdale's place in the army during the American Civil War
- Professor Werfner, German professor with a bitter personal rivalry with one Professor Renfrew ("Werfner" spelled backwards)
- Luca Zombini, a travelling magician.
  - Erlys Rideout, his wife, Merle Rideout's ex-wife, and Dahlia's mother.
  - Cici, Dominic, Nunzio, his sons.
  - Bria, Concetta, Lucia, his daughters.

=== Notable organisations ===
- Chums of Chance, Five "cheerful young balloonists who drop into the story at critical moments and who seem capable of time travel", all aboard the skyship Inconvenience
- T.W.I.T., True Worshippers of the Ineffable Tetractys (T.W.I.T.), "a covert London group fighting the powers of darkness".

== Themes ==
Critic Louis Menand sees an organizing theme of the book as

something like this: An enormous technological leap occurred in the decades around 1900. This advance was fired by some mixed-up combination of abstract mathematical speculation, capitalist greed, global geopolitical power struggle, and sheer mysticism. We know (roughly) how it all turned out, but if we had been living in those years it would have been impossible to sort out the fantastical possibilities from the plausible ones. Maybe we could split time and be in two places at once, or travel backward and forward at will, or maintain parallel lives in parallel universes. It turns out (so far) that we can't. But we did split the atom — an achievement that must once have seemed equally far-fetched. Against the Day is a kind of inventory of the possibilities inherent in a particular moment in the history of the imagination. It is like a work of science fiction written in 1900.

Menand states that this theme also appeared in Pynchon's Mason & Dixon and that it ties in with a concern present in nearly all of Pynchon's books:

[Pynchon] was apparently thinking what he usually thinks, which is that modern history is a war between utopianism and totalitarianism, counterculture and hegemony, anarchism and corporatism, nature and techne, Eros and the death drive, slaves and masters, entropy and order, and that the only reasonably good place to be in such a world, given that you cannot be outside of it, is between the extremes. "Those whose enduring object is power in this world are only too happy to use without remorse the others, whose aim is of course to transcend all questions of power. Each regards the other as a pack of deluded fools," as one of the book's innumerable walk-ons, a Professor Svegli of the University of Pisa, puts it. Authorial sympathy in Pynchon's novels always lies on the "transcend all questions of power," countercultural side of the struggle; that's where the good guys — the oddballs, dropouts, and hapless dreamers — tend to gather. But his books also dramatize the perception that resistance to domination can develop into its own regime of domination. The tendency of extremes is to meet, and perfection in life is a false Grail, a foreclosure of possibility, a kind of death. Of binaries beware.

[...] Science is either a method of disenchantment and control or it is a window onto possible worlds: it all depends on the application. [...] [T]he relevant science [in this book] [...] is mathematics, specifically, the mathematics associated with electromagnetism, mechanics, and optics — with electric light, the movies, and, eventually, weapons of mass destruction.

Steven Moore, in a book review in The Washington Post, writes:

Pynchon is mostly concerned with how decent people of any era cope under repressive regimes, be they political, economic or religious. [...] 'Capitalist Christer Republicans' are a recurring target of contempt, and bourgeois values are portrayed as essentially totalitarian."

Jazz (or, as Pynchon refers to it in one variant spelling of the novel's time period, "Jass") provides a non-hierarchical model of organization that the author relates to politics about a third of the way through the novel, according to Leith, who quotes from the passage, in which 'Dope' Breedlove, an Irish revolutionist at a Jazz-bar, makes the point. Breedlove characterises the Irish Land League as "the closest the world has ever come to a perfect Anarchist organization".

"Were the phrase not self-contradictory," commented 'Dope' Breedlove.
"Yet I've noticed the same thing when your band plays — the most amazing social coherence, as if you all shared the same brain."
"Sure," agreed 'Dope', "but you can't call that organization."
"What do you call it?"
"Jass."

In a Bloomberg News review, Craig Seligman identifies three overarching themes in the novel: doubling, light and war.

=== Doubling ===
"Pynchon makes much of a variety of calcite called Iceland spar, valued for its optical quality of double refraction; in Pynchonland, a magician can use it to split one person into two, who then wander off to lead their own lives", Seligman writes.

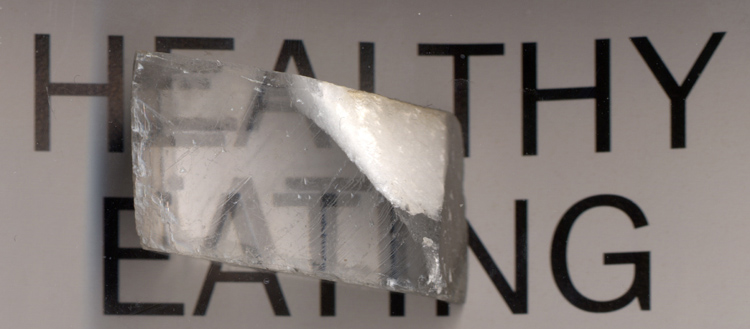
The doubling effect of Iceland spar. Compare with the book's cover image above.

Sam Leith identifies the same theme:

"The book is shot through with doubling, or surrogacy. There are the palindromic rival scientists Renfrew and Werfner. [...] Events on one side of the world have an occult influence on those on the other. 'Double refraction' through a particular sort of crystal allows you to turn silver into gold. Mirrors are to be regarded with, at least, suspicion. It gets more complicated, and sillier. We're introduced to the notion of 'bilocation' — where characters appear in two places at once; much like particles in quantum physics — and, later, to that of 'co-consciousness', where someone's own mind somehow bifurcates. 'He wondered if he could be his own ghost,' Pynchon writes of one character."

=== War ===
Although the novel directly portrays the First Balkan War (1912–1913) and the Mexican Revolution (1910–1920), it dispatches World War I after a few pages. But during most of the book the Great War "looms as an approaching catastrophe", according to Seligman. This theme might form part of what Menand describes above as the struggle between power-pursuers and power-transcenders.

=== Light ===
Light becomes a "preoccupation [...] to which everything, finally, returns", according to reviewer Sam Leith.

Light appears as a religious symbol or element and as a scientific phenomenon, as Peter Keouge, in his Boston Phoenix review points out:

Here is where some familiarity with pre-Einsteinian theories of light (the discredited concept of Æther is vindicated) and mathematical controversies around the turn of the last century pays off. Kit, for example is a Vectorist. He will later get cozy with Yashmeen, herself an exotic orphan. She's a Quarternionist (cf. William Rowan Hamilton's formula i² = j² = k² = ijk = -1, which somehow, I suspect, relates to the structure of the book, each term in the equation applicable to each of the novel's five sections) obsessed with the Zeta function of G.F.B. Riemann. In addition, she has ties to the True Worshippers of the Ineffable Tetractys (T.W.I.T.), a covert London group fighting the powers of darkness through Pythagorean beliefs and the tarot.

In his Bloomberg News review, Craig Seligman portrays the book as "overstuffed with wonders" often related to light, including a luminous Mexican beetle and the Tunguska Event of 1908 that leaves the native reindeer soaring and "stimulated by the accompanying radiation into an epidermal luminescence at the red end of the spectrum, particularly around the nasal area" (reminiscent of the luminescence of a certain fictional reindeer). "[T]he novel is full of images of light, like those beetles and those noses (and the title)", Seligman reports.

Reviewer Tom Leclair notes light in various flashy appearances:

God said, 'Let there be light'; Against the Day collects ways our ancestors attempted to track light back to its source and replaced religion with alternative lights. There is the light of relativity, the odd light of electromagnetic storms, the light of the mysterious Tunguska event of 1908, when a meteorite struck Siberia or God announced a coming apocalypse. [...] the dynamite flash, the diffracted light of Iceland spar, the reflected light of magicians' mirrors, the 'light writing' of photography and movies, the cities' new electric lighting that makes the heavens invisible at night.

Scott McLemee sees connections between light, space-time and politics:

The "mythology" governing Pynchon's novel (enriching it, complicating it, and giving the untutored reader a headache) involves the relationship between the nature of light and the structure of space-time. It's an effort, perhaps, to imagine something beyond our familiar world, in which "progress" has meant a growing capacity to dominate and to kill.

"Political space has its neutral ground," says another character in what may be the definitive passage of the novel. "But does Time? is there such a thing as the neutral hour? one that goes neither forward nor back? is that too much to hope?" (Or as Joyce has Stephen Dedalus say in "Ulysses": "History is a nightmare from which I am trying to awake.")

It remains unclear whether Pynchon himself regards such escape or transcendence as really possible.

== Critical reception ==
=== Characterization ===
Some reviewers complain that Pynchon's characters have little emotional depth and therefore don't excite the sympathy of the reader. For example, Laura Miller in Salon.com:

Time doesn't exist, but it crushes us anyway; everyone could see World War I coming, but no one could stop it — those are two weighty paradoxes that hover over the action in "Against the Day" without truly engaging with it. This is the stuff of tragedy, but since the people it sort of happens to are flimsy constructions, we don't experience it as tragic. We just watch Pynchon point to it like bystanders watching the Chums of Chance's airship float by overhead.

New York Times reviewer Michiko Kakutani writes of the characterizations: "[B]ecause these people are so flimsily delineated, their efforts to connect feel merely sentimental and contrived."

In some of the reviews to his previous works, Pynchon had been called a cold, lapidary writer. Poet L. E. Sissman, from The New Yorker, instead praised and defended him, saying

I do not find him to be one. Though his characters are not developed along conventional lines, they do, in their recalcitrant human oddity, live, and they do eventually touch the reader more than he at first thinks they will.

As a complement to Miller's criticism about tragedy, Adam Kirsch sees comedy as undercut as well, although parody remains:

The gaudy names Mr. Pynchon gives his characters are like pink slips, announcing their dismissal from the realm of human sympathy and concern. This contraction of the novel's scope makes impossible any genuine comedy, which depends on the observation of real human beings and their insurmountable, forgivable weaknesses. What replaces it is parody, whose target is language itself, and which operates by short-circuiting the discourses we usually take for granted. And it is as parody — in fact, a whole album of parodies — that Against the Day is most enjoyable.

Lucy Sante wrote in the New York Review of Books: "The sheer mass of the book will probably frighten many readers away, who might perhaps appreciate it if they were fed it in serial installments. More of a problem is the fact that length invariably becomes the primary subject of criticism; a number of early reviews seemed to focus on little else and it didn’t help, either, that the publication schedule only gave critics about two weeks to digest the thing. But Pynchon’s work is dense as well as huge—like a linebacker, it has an exceptionally low percentage of flab—and his best books have been his longest ones."

== Secondary bibliography ==
- St. Clair, Justin. "Borrowed Time: Thomas Pynchon's Against the Day and the Victorian Fourth Dimension". Science-Fiction Studies #113, 38:1, March 2011, 46–66.
