= Entwined =

Entwined may refer to

- Entwined (novel), a 2011 fairytale fantasy novel by Heather Dixon
- Entwined (video game), a video game developed by PixelOpus and published by Sony in 2014
- "Entwined", a song by Lacuna Coil from the album Comalies, 2002
- "Entwined", a song by Coal Chamber from the album Chamber Music
