= La Ramée and the Phantom =

French fairy tale

La Ramée and the Phantom is a French fairy tale collected by Achille Millien and Paul Delarue.

It is Aarne-Thompson type 307, the princess in the shroud. This type is found throughout Europe, particularly in Russia. The Princess in the Chest is a Danish form.

== Synopsis ==
A soldier, La Ramée, re-enlisted twice in hopes of making corporal. When his captain said he would have to re-enlist a third, he left. He came to a town all hung in black and heard that ever since the king's daughter died, a phantom has smothered, every night, a soldier left on guard in the church. If a man stayed in the church three nights, the phantom would be stopped. La Ramée decided to dare it. The first night, he hid behind the altar, during the quarter-hour while the phantom walked; it spotted him just before midnight, and vanished when the clock struck. The second night, he hid in the pulpit; the phantom hunted for him for half an hour and had its feet on the stairs to the pulpit when midnight struck. He was too afraid to stay for a third, and went to flee. A woman spoke to him, knowing he was running away, and gave him a pair of scissors, telling him to pare the nails of the phantom's hands and feet. The third night, he did not hide, but as soon as the phantom arrived, it threw its arms about him, and he pared the nails. It turned into a beautiful princess. She told him that she had not been dead, but buried alive. The king let him marry her.

== See also ==
- The Twelve Dancing Princesses
- Kate Crackernuts
