= The Door in the Hedge =

Fairy tales by Robin McKinley

- First edition cover Cover artist: Ted Bernstein
- Author: Robin McKinley
- Publisher: Greenwillow Books
- Publication date: April 1, 1981
- ISBN: 978-0-688-00312-8

The Door in the Hedge is a collection of fairy tales by Robin McKinley, published by William Morrow and Company under its Greenwillow Books imprint in 1981. It includes two original stories and two retellings.

- "The Stolen Princess"
- "The Princess and the Frog", a version of "The Frog Prince"
- "The Hunting of the Hind"
- "The Twelve Dancing Princesses", a 77-page version of "Twelve Dancing Princesses"

== Summary ==
=== The Stolen Princess ===
When Princess Linadel is taken by the neighboring fairies, she is forced to choose between the love of the fairy prince or her responsibilities as heir apparent. However, rather than having to make such a choice, she, the prince, and their parents ultimately decide to bring the Kingdom of the Humans and the Kingdom of the Fairies together as one world.

=== The Princess and the Frog ===
Princess Rana's kingdom and family are being threatened by the evil and sinister sorcerer Prince Aliyander. However, when the talking frog she befriends comes between her and Aliyander, Aliyander attempts to hurt it, unwittingly freeing the cursed Prince Lian, Aliyander's brother. As a confrontation ensues, Lian aids Rana in defeating Aliyander for good.

=== The Hunting of the Hind ===
After her brother is enchanted by the cursed Golden Hind, misfit Princess Korah rides out to chase the hind herself. She follows it inside a stone hill where she finds the hind has turned into a beautiful woman. The woman and her brother tell her of their imprisonment by a jealous sorcerer, and of the terms needed to break the curse. Korah goes to free the siblings, and is successful. The liberated siblings then return to Korah's kingdom, where the prince, whose sickness came from his attempt to break the curse himself, is joyfully waiting for them.

=== The Twelve Dancing Princesses ===
This retelling of the classic fairy tale follows the tale faithfully with a few added details. When the twelve daughters of the king start mysteriously wearing out their dancing shoes, he tries to uncover the mystery, but only finds out that his daughters are cursed. He sends out an invitation allowing any man to have one of his daughters' hand in marriage in return for breaking the curse. Meanwhile, a weary soldier is told the whole story of the curse by an old woman: the princesses are being forced to dance with a witch's twelve demonic sons so that she may entrap the girls so tightly that they'll be forced to marry them. The soldier takes up the challenge, and is given a magic cloak to make him invisible. The soldier uses the cloak to follow the princesses for the three nights to an underground, magical kingdom, taking a couple of objects back with him. On the morning of the final night, the soldier reveals the mystery to an assembly, and a sudden earthquake buries the entrance to the underground kingdom forever. The eldest princess marries the soldier.
