= The Twelve Dancing Princesses =

German fairy tale

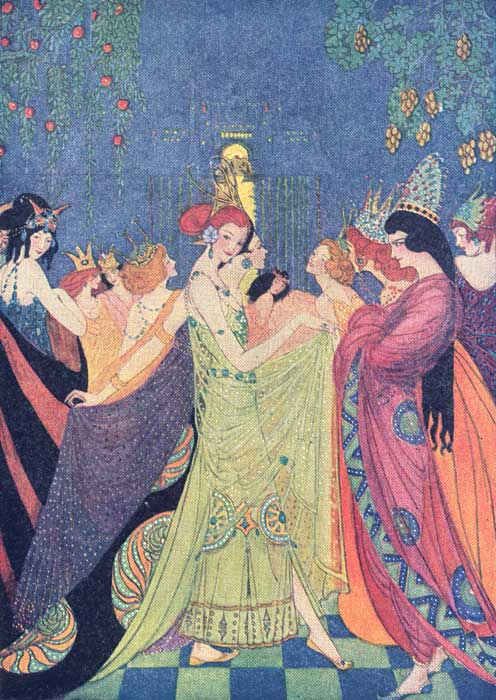
- 1920 illustration by Elenore Abbott

Folk tale
- Name: The Twelve Dancing Princesses
- Aarne–Thompson grouping: ATU 306
- Country: Germany
- Region: Münster
- Published in: Kinder- und Hausmärchen
- Related: Kate Crackernuts

"The Twelve Dancing Princesses" (also "The Worn-Out Dancing Shoes" or "The Shoes that were Danced to Pieces"; German: Die zertanzten Schuhe) is a German fairy tale collected by the Brothers Grimm and published in Grimm's Fairy Tales in 1815 (KHM 133). It is of Aarne-Thompson type 306.

Charles Deulin collected another, French version in his Contes du Roi Cambrinus (1874), which he credited to the Grimm version. Alexander Afanasyev collected two Russian variants, entitled "The Night Dances", in his Narodnye russkie skazki.

Its closest analogue is the Scottish Kate Crackernuts, where it is a prince who is obliged to dance every night.

== Origin ==
The tale was published by the Brothers Grimm in the first edition of Kinder- und Hausmärchen, volume 2, in 1815. Their source was Jenny von Droste-Hülshoff. It was originally numbered 47 but appeared as KHM 133 in subsequent editions.

== Synopsis ==
In a kingdom lives a king and his twelve daughters. The twelve princesses sleep in twelve beds in the same bedroom, the doors to which their father locks every night. But every morning, the king unlocks his daughters' bedroom doors to find their shoes worn out as if they have been dancing all night. The king, perplexed, promises that any man who can solve the mystery can marry any of the twelve princesses and inherit the kingdom; each suitor, however, will be given only three days and three nights to discover the princesses' secret or he will be beheaded.

Many princes attempt to discover where the twelve princesses dance every night, but all of them fail and are executed. An old soldier, returning from war, meets an old woman to whom he tells of his decision to try the king's challenge. The old woman warns the soldier to avoid drinking the wine the princesses will give him and to pretend to be fast asleep until they leave, and gives him an invisibility cloak that he can use to observe them.

The soldier is well received at the palace and in the evening, the eldest princess comes to his chamber and offers him a cup of wine. The soldier, remembering the old woman's advice, secretly pours the wine into a sponge he has tied under his chin and lies on his bed, snoring loudly as if he were asleep.

The twelve princesses, assured that the soldier is asleep, dress themselves in fine dancing gowns and escape from their room by a trapdoor beneath the eldest one's bed. The soldier, seeing this, puts on his invisibility cloak and follows them down a flight of stairs. He steps on the gown of the youngest princess, whose cry of alarm to her sisters is rebuffed by the eldest. The passageway leads them to three groves of trees: the first having silver trees, the second golden trees, and the third diamond trees. The invisible soldier breaks off a twig from each grove as evidence, scaring the youngest princess each time he does so. Whenever the youngest princess warns her sisters of the sounds of wood cracking, the eldest dismisses them as salutes. They walk on until they come upon a great clear lake where twelve princes, in twelve boats, are waiting for the twelve princesses. Each princess gets into one boat, the soldier boarding the same one as the youngest princess, whose partner is curious that their ride is heavier than usual. On the other side of the lake stands a castle, into which the twelve princesses go and dance the night away.

The twelve princesses happily dance until three in the morning when their shoes are worn out and they must leave. When the twelve princes row the twelve princesses back across the lake, the soldier sits by the eldest. When they reach the top of the secret staircase, the soldier runs ahead of the twelve princesses and lies back in his bed, snoring to trick them into thinking that their secret remains safe.

The soldier does not tell the king of his discovery right away, and follows and spies on the twelve princesses on the second and third nights, with everything happening just as before. On the third night, the soldier carries away a cup as a fourth token of where he has been. When the time comes for him to declare the princesses' secret, the soldier reveals the three twigs and the cup, and tells the king about all he has seen. The princesses know that there is no use in denying the truth, and confess. The soldier chooses the eldest princess as his bride for he is no longer a young man, and is made the king's heir.

The twelve princes are cursed for as many nights as they have danced with the twelve princesses.

== Background ==
The Brothers Grimm learned the tale from their friends, the Haxthausens, who had heard the tale in Münster. Other versions were known in Hesse and Paderborn. In the Hesse version, only one princess is believed to be responsible for wearing out a dozen shoes every night until a young shoemaker's apprentice discovers that she is joined by eleven other princesses in the revels. The spell is broken, and the apprentice marries the princess. In the Paderborn version, it is three princesses who dance nightly in a palace escorted by three giants. This version introduces the ruse of the soldier disposing of the drugged wine and pretending to be asleep.

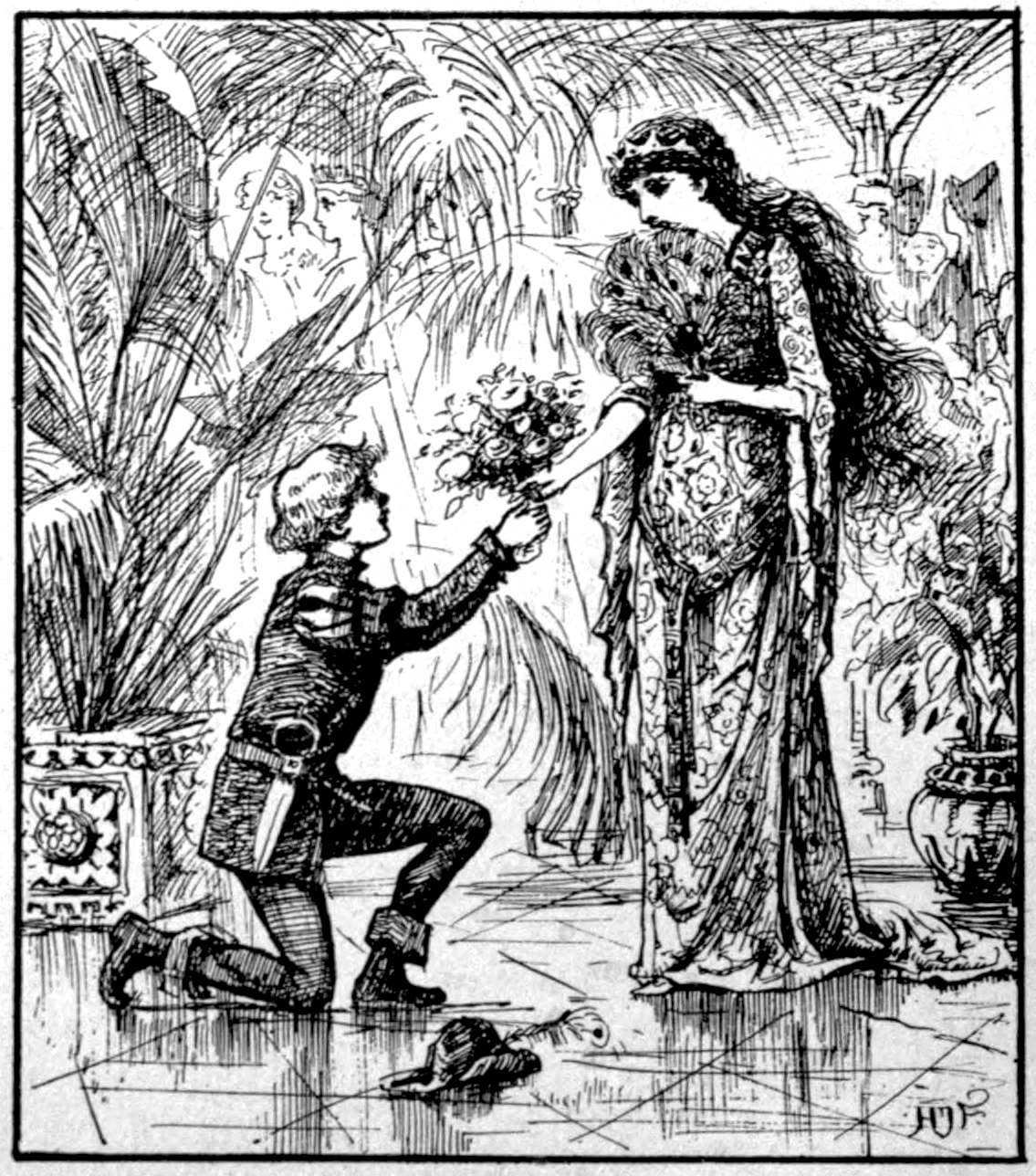
Michael brings Lina flowers

Victorian editors disliked the "do or die" aspect imposed upon those willing to discover the Princesses' whereabouts, and found ways to avoid it. The candidates who failed simply vanished without explanation instead of being sent to their deaths. Andrew Lang's version has the questing princes vanish and it is revealed they have been enchanted and trapped in the underground world. The hero of Lang's version is a cowherd named Michael, who marries the youngest princess, Lina, not the eldest. Her sisters each marry one of the contestants once they are freed from the enchantment.

The garden of trees with gold, silver, and diamond leaves recalls a similar garden in the Sumerian epic of Gilgamesh.

The Princesses in the Grimms' version are portrayed as somewhat malicious characters, showing no remorse for lying to their father, and repeatedly giving their suitors drugged wine to ensure that their mystery remains unsolved, knowing that those who fail are put to death.

== Variants ==
The tale is not likely to be earlier than the 17th century and many variants are known from different countries.

- Europe:
  - Scotland – Katie Crackernuts or Katherine Crackernuts
  - France – The Twelve Dancing Princesses
  - Portugal – The Moorish Prince and the Christian Princess, The Seven Iron Slippers
  - Germany – The Shoes That Were Danced to Pieces, The Twelve Dancing Princesses
  - Denmark – The Princess with the Twelve Pair of Golden Shoes
  - Iceland – Hild, Queen of the Elves; Hildur the Fairy Queen; Hildur, the Queen of the Elves
  - Czech Republic – The Three Girls
  - Slovakia – The Three Girls
  - Hungary – The Hell-Bent Misses, The Invisible Shepherd Lad
  - Romania – The Slippers of the Twelve Princesses, The Twelve Princesses with the Worn-Out Slipper
  - Russia – The Danced Out Shoes; Elena the Wise; The Midnight Dance; The Secret Ball
  - Armenia – The Giant-Slayer
- Africa:
  - Cape Verde – The Shoes That Were Danced To Pieces; Dividing the Heirlooms: The Shoes That Were Danced To Pieces
- Middle East:
  - Turkey – The Magic Turban, the Magic Whip, and the Magic Carpet
  - Arabic - The Golden City
- Asia:
  - India – Dorani, "The Invisible Woman"
  - Bengal – The Kotwal's Daughter, The Rose of Bakáwalí
  - Uzbek - Mohistara.

In variants, the princesses vary in number, sometimes being just one maiden. In other variants, the princess goes to a night dance with a supernatural character, such as the Devil.

A French literary version exists, penned by Charles Deulin in his Contes du Roi Cambrinus.

== Adaptations ==
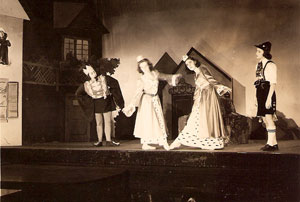
Performance of a play based on the tale in Maine in 1942

=== Literature ===
- Jeanette Winterson varies and adds to this tale in Sexing the Cherry, in which the old soldier is a prince with 11 brothers, each of which marries a sister except the youngest, who escapes before her wedding to the prince.
- It was retold in literature as Walter de la Mare's Told Again and Tales Told Again and in Robin McKinley's The Door in the Hedge.
- In some versions, such as the one in Robin McKinley's The Door in the Hedge and Ellen Kushner's in Troll's-Eye View, the eldest princess disguises herself as an old woman to give the soldier life-saving advice.
- Patricia A. McKillip wrote an adaptation for the anthology A Wolf at the Door. It has a few variations, the most significant being that the princes who the princesses were spending their nights dancing with were actually dead, and planning to take the princesses away from the mortal world forever the night after the soldier reveals what the princesses were doing.
- The Once Upon a Time novel series published by Simon Pulse featured a retelling of the story as The Night Dance by Suzanne Weyn. The story is set in Arthurian legends, with Vivienne, the Lady of the Lake, as the mother of the twelve princesses, comprised as six pairs of twin sisters.
- Anne Sexton wrote an adaptation as a poem called "The Twelve Dancing Princesses" in her collection Transformations (1971), a book in which she re-envisions sixteen of the Grimm's Fairy tales.
- The Juliet Marillier novel Wildwood Dancing gives a retelling set in Transylvania, mixed with traditional Transylvanian folk tales. The underground kingdom they dance in is the fairy kingdom, to which they have gained entrance by the grace of the Witch of the Wood.
- Diane Zahler's middle-grade novel The Thirteenth Princess retells the story from the perspective of an additional thirteenth sister, Zita. Her father, who wanted sons, banished her to live in the servants' quarters. When Zita's twelve sisters fall mysteriously ill, she must find a way to break the dancing curse.
- Jessica Day George's novel Princess of the Midnight Ball is a retelling with the twist that the princesses are cursed to dance every night for an evil sorcerer, the King Under Stone.
- Heather Dixon's novel, Entwined, retells the story from the point of view of Azalea, the oldest of the 12 sisters.
- Genevieve Valentine's The Girls at the Kingfisher Club is a novel-length reimagining of the fairytale that is set in New York City in the Jazz Age. The twelve sisters are kept in the upper story of their father's brownstone because he is embarrassed at his failure to produce a male heir.
- Catherynne M. Valente's novella, Speak Easy retells the fairytale set in New York during the Jazz Age, at the magical Artemisia Hotel and a fictionalized version of Zelda Fitzgerald as the main character.
- In Mirrored, a book by Alex Flinn, Kendra the witch briefly mentions the Twelve Dancing Princesses as a time that she lived through.
- House of Salt and Sorrows is another retelling of the tale by Erin A. Craig with a darker twist. Set in a peaceful island, it follows the story of Annaleigh, the sixth daughter, as she and her family do their best to recover from the deaths of her four oldest sisters and the supposed curse that surrounds their family.
- The Phoenix Dance by Dia Calhoun follows the titular character Phoenix Dance who is the shoemaker's apprentice in the fantasy kingdom of Windward. When the shoemaker is blamed for the twelve princesses' shoes breaking constantly, Phoenix takes it upon herself to figure out what's going on; taking a role in the story that traditionally falls to a man. Calhoun wrote this as a companion novel to Aria of the Sea which is a retelling of the same iteration of the Twelve Dancing Princesses. Another unique element that Calhoun includes is Phoenix's struggle with something akin to bipolar disorder which plays an important role in her attempts at unraveling the mystery.

=== Film and Television ===
- A 1977 East German TV-Movie made in partnership with Fernsehen der DDR & DEFA. In this version there are seven instead of 12.
- Happily Ever After: Fairy Tales for Every Child had an episode called "The Twelve Dancing Princesses".
- In Barbie in the 12 Dancing Princesses, Barbie plays the role of the 7th of 12 sisters, Genevieve. This version takes extensive liberties: the princesses are escaping from an evil governess who won't let them dance in the castle (and turns out to be poisoning their father), and the series of men trying to discover their secret is replaced with Derek, a royal cobbler who actively aids them and becomes Genevieve's love interest.
- In 1978, a made-for-TV retelling of the story was directed by Ben Rea, featuring Jim Dale as the Soldier, Freddie Jones as the destitute King, and Gloria Grahame as the Witch. Significant changes were made to the story, including reducing the number of princesses to six, and the soldier ultimately declining to marry any of the princesses due to their deceitful nature.
- The children's television show Super Why! included an episode called "The Twelve Dancing Princesses" (Season 1. Episode 21, premiered in 2008. In this adaptation, the king asks the Super Readers to find out where his daughters are disappearing to each night. When their secret is discovered, the princesses confess to the Super Readers that they have been planning a surprise party for their father, which everyone gets to attend.
- The television series Faerie Tale Theatre had an episode entitled "The Dancing Princesses". There were six princesses as opposed to twelve, but otherwise the story remains the same.
- The anime series Grimm's Fairy Tale Classics, is based on the Grimm's variant that has only three princesses: Genevieve is the eldest, her middle sister is named Louise, and the youngest is named Julia. It features a twist within the story - it turns out demons live within the magical palace and have placed a spell on Genevieve (and then Louise and Julia) before the soldier, a handsome young man named Peter, realizes the truth and rescues them. In this version, the failed suitors are sent to prison instead of executed and the king frees them once Peter solves the mystery. Additionally Peter acquires the magic cloak and some magic shoes from a kappa and another demon who take the form of two men who were arguing over the cloak and shoes; Peter tricks them into competing over the cloak and shoes which allows him to steal them, after which he discovers them to be demons. The cloak makes him invisible and allows him to see through the demon's illusion, while the shoes allow him to levitate and move quickly. After freeing the girls from their trance Peter aids them in fleeing from the demons, though he loses the cloak and shoes in the process; in return, Genevieve and then her sisters help him when the demons almost pull him back inside their world. At the end Peter and Genevieve fall in love and happily marry.
- Another Hungarian variant of the tale was adapted into an episode of the Hungarian television series Magyar népmesék ("Hungarian Folk Tales") (hu), with the title A papucsszaggató királykisasszonyok ("The Slipper-Tearing Princesses"). In this version, the three princesses mount on magical brooms and travel to a secret location to dance with devils on a floor of razor.
- Classix Animation Studios' second animated feature, 12 Princesses featuring a king is coping with his wife's death and is driven to madness, and the series of men who try to solve the mystery of the dancing princesses is replaced with Yannick, a farm boy who becomes Princess December's love interest and the main protagonist.

=== Theatre ===
- In 1990, Laura Bedore, Dorothy Keddington and Stephanie Clark published a stage version of The Twelve Dancing Princesses. In this family friendly musical, the 12 princes are sent to the dungeon after their failure to solve the mystery of the shoes but are reunited with their princesses after the soldier, aided by a befriended witch, is able to do so.
- Adapted into a play by I.E. Clark in 1969.
- A musical theatre adaptation "Worn Out", written by Zoe Morris and Meg McGrady and produced by British Youth Music Theatre was at the Manchester Lowry, UK in August 2025. This twist on the fairy tale features the princesses uncovering a rising revolution in the fictional Zloriv and facing the question will they follow tradition or fight for freedom.

=== Music and Audio ===
- Jim Weiss narrates a more child-friendly version of this story on his audio CD Best Loved Stories. In this version, the protagonist is portrayed as an unwitting war hero, and is offered milk, not wine, by the princesses. Failed attempts at discovering the princesses' secret results in banishment from the kingdom instead of death. Finally, the protagonist, named Carl Gustav in this version, chooses the youngest daughter ("Rosebud") and to be the steward of all of the King's gardens rather than choosing the oldest to become heir to the throne.
- "Hawa Hawa", a Hindi song from the 2011 Indian film Rockstar, is based on the Czech version of the fairy tale.

=== Other Media ===
- The story has been added to the Ever After High franchise, including the web series, film, and two book series. The character Justine Dancer is the daughter of the 12th and youngest dancing princess.

== See also ==
- La Ramée and the Phantom
- The Princess in the Chest
- Princess of the Midnight Ball, Jessica Day George's adaption of the tale
- Entwined, Heather Dixon's adaptation
- Wildwood Dancing, Juliet Marillier's adaptation
