= The Princess in the Chest =

Danish fairy tale

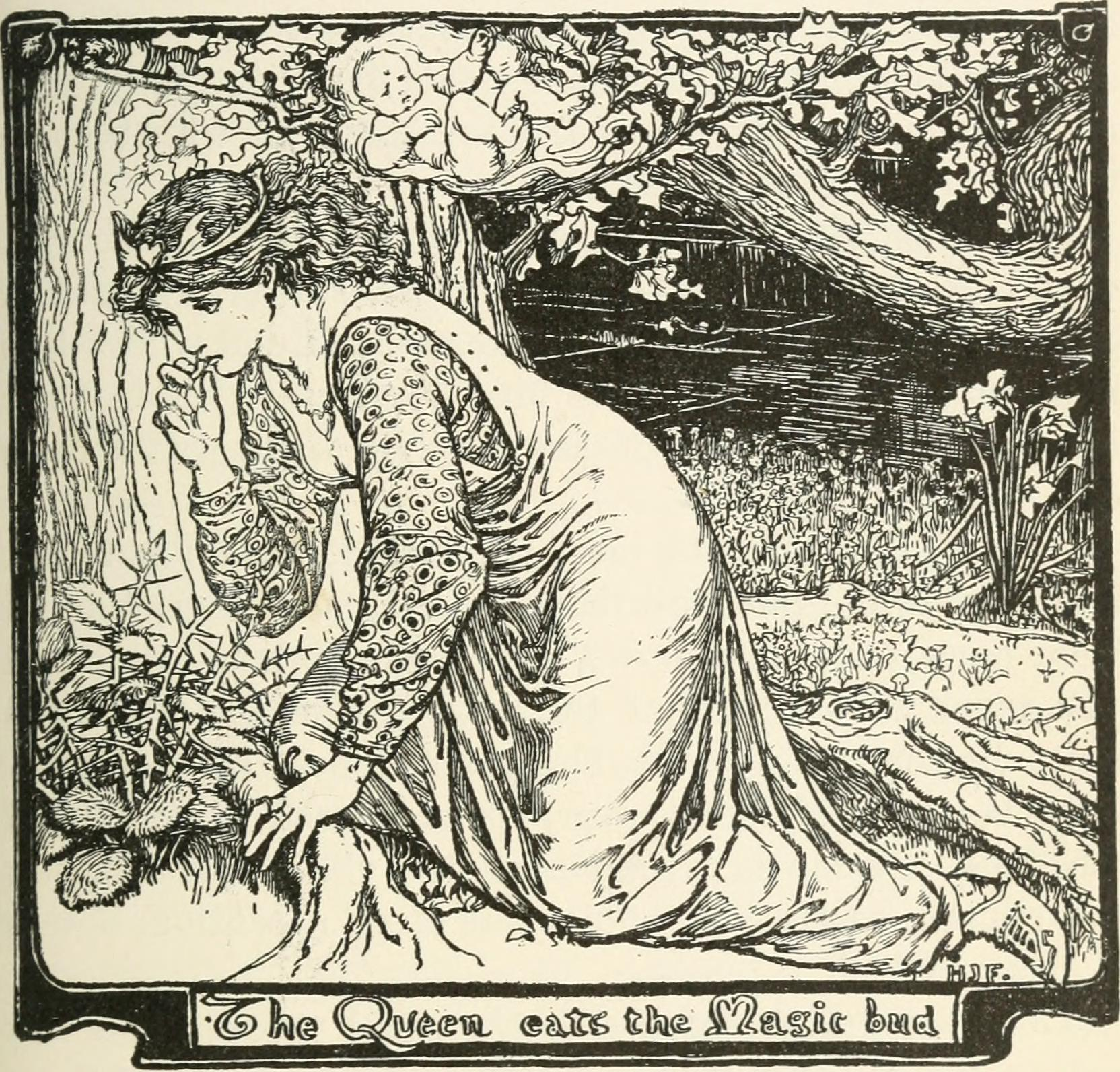
The queen eats the magic bud

The Princess in the Chest, also known as The Princess in the Coffin (Danish: Prinsessen i Kisten) is a Danish fairy tale. Andrew Lang included an altered translation of it in The Pink Fairy Book (1897). J. Grant Cramer included a full translation in Danish Fairy Tales (1919).

Another tale of this type is La Ramée and the Phantom.

== Synopsis ==
A king left his queen because they were childless and told her if she did not have a child by the time he returned, in a year, he would part with her. An old woman advised her to eat a bud from a bush. She would have a daughter. The old woman would give her a nurse, who must raise the girl without anyone else seeing her until she was fourteen. The queen did as she said, but when the fourteen years were one day short of complete, the king went to see her. The princess said that now she would die. The king had his choice of a pestilence, a long and bloody war, or putting her body in a wooden coffin and setting a sentinel over it every day for a year. He did not believe it, but chose the coffin. The next morning, she was dead. He did as she directed, but every night, the sentinel vanished. Soon, the story was that the princess ate whoever it was, and soldiers deserted rather than take on the duty. The king got more volunteers by offering money, but no one ever received it.

Nearly a year later, a strapping young smith named Christian came to the capital looking for work. A pair of sergeants ordered food and wine for him until Christian was drunk enough to agree to the job, which paid one hundred dollars. They locked him in the church at eight o'clock, but when the drink wore off, he tried to escape out the belfry. A little man stopped him and told him to stay in the pulpit until the coffin lid slammed. He went into the pulpit, and at midnight, the coffin lid was thrown aside, and the princess, "covered in quills like a porcupine," came out and howled, demanding the sentinel. She saw him in the pulpit but could not get up after him. Finally, when the clock struck one she had to go back to the coffin, and the lid shut itself over her.

The next day, the king gave him a hundred dollars and a good breakfast, where he had plenty to drink, until the king offered him two hundred dollars, and Christian agreed to stay the next night, too. He tried to escape through a little door near the altar, and the little man stopped him again, telling him to stay in front of the altar and hold the prayer book there. At midnight the princess rushed up to the pulpit that night; when she did not find him, she shrieked that war and pestilence would begin, but then she saw him and could not reach him, and at one o'clock had to go back into the coffin again.

The third day, Christian agreed when drunk again, but only for half the kingdom. This time, every way out of the church was locked, so he climbed to a window and broke it to crawl out and run to a row boat on the shore. The little man stopped the boat, but this time commanded him to lie down by the coffin and climb inside as soon as she left it. She came out at midnight and shrieked that war and pestilence would come. She eventually found him in the coffin but was unable to reach him. Appearing human now, she sweetly implored him to get out and let her lie down again in the coffin, but he did not move. One hour after midnight, she vanished. Christian heard music, a mass of thanksgiving being said for her deliverance, and his own wedding to the princess being officiated. At dawn he came out and found the princess alive. She told him the curse was broken and if he agreed, they would marry. If not, she would go to a convent and he could never marry another as long as she lived (for the service he'd heard was a marriage ceremony of the dead). Christian agreed to marry. The king consented and made good on his promise to give Christian half his kingdom, eventually inheriting its entirety on the king's death.

Years later, they found a vault beneath the church containing the skeletons of the missing sentries. The princess had drunk three drops of blood from each of them and broken their necks.

== Analysis ==
=== Tale type ===
The tale is classified in the Aarne-Thompson-Uther Index as tale type ATU 307, "The Princess in the Shroud" or "The Princess in the Coffin": a cursed princess or woman comes out of her grave or coffin at night to attack people. These tales are, according to scholarship, more commonly collected among East European populations, especially in Russia.

German scholar Kurt Ranke supposed that the tale type originated from Eastern European legends about vampirism.

=== Distribution ===
The tale type is also present in the Ukrainian tale corpus, with a number between 22 and 28 variants collected under the banner The Princess Rising from the Grave.

According to professor Jūratė Šlekonytė, type 307 is "popular all over Lithuania", with 222 variants registered.

== See also ==
- The Twelve Dancing Princesses
- Kate Crackernuts
