= Metahistorical romance =

Metahistorical romance is a term describing postmodern historical fiction, defined by Amy J. Elias in Sublime Desire: History and Post-1960s Fiction. Elias defines metahistorical romance as a form of historical fiction continuing the legacy of historical romance inaugurated by Sir Walter Scott but also having ties to contemporary postmodern historiography. A metahistorical romance does not merely use history for the setting and events of the novel, but forces the reader to reexamine history, and their own view of it. It accomplishes this by reinterpreting historical events, writing about ordinary people, crossing between various time periods, or bending history in other ways. In Elias's usage, romance does not signify novels focused on marriage and love, but instead a style in which past events are "romanticized" and reinterpreted.

== Theory ==
Metahistorical romance ties closely to the related philosophies of poststructuralism and postmodernism, which sought to push back against a confidence in human reasoning and knowledge. Instead, postmodernists questioned whether we could trust our own vantage point, and instead sought to use irony, deconstruction, and criticism to dismantle the theoretical frameworks of others. In this way, metahistorical romance does not seek to present a perfect view of the past, but rather augments and alters the past in order to provide a new, unique perspective, one that challenges past historical conventions or conceptions.

In this way, metahistorical romances connect to Hayden White's concept of the "historical sublime," the theoretical past created by our minds and the world around us. These novels show us both how much we desire and reach for the historical sublime and also how far off and impossible it truly is. An example of this is Thomas Pynchon's novel Mason & Dixon, in which the narrator, who supposedly accompanied Charles Mason and Jeremiah Dixon on their creation of the Mason–Dixon line, tells tales that mingle history, fantasy, legend, and speculation. By combining these, Pynchon is creating an idealized and romanticized vision of history through his narrator, while also mingling our ideas of history with legends, folktales, and fictitious elements.

Elias's concept of the metahistorical romance is closely related to, and influenced by, Linda Hutcheon's concept of historiographic metafiction. Both terms reference works that combine elements of the historical and the non-historical or fantastic, employing them specifically in the context of postmodern literary conventions. Historiographic metafiction is a slightly larger term, encompassing novels that may not center around a historical event, such as Kurt Vonnegut's Slaughterhouse-Five, or not employ the characteristic features of a "romance" as defined by Elias.

== Examples ==
- The Sot-Weed Factor, by John Barth (1960)
- The French Lieutenant's Woman, by John Fowles (1969)
- Mumbo Jumbo, by Ishmael Reed (1972)
- Flight to Canada, by Ishmael Reed (1976)
- The Public Burning, by Robert Coover (1976)
- Flaubert's Parrot, by Julian Barnes (1984)
- A Maggot, by John Fowles (1985)
- Hawksmoor, by Peter Ackroyd (1985)
- Foe, by J. M. Coetzee (1986)
- Chatterton, by Peter Ackroyd (1987)
- Sexing the Cherry, by Jeanette Winterson (1989)
- Lempriere's Dictionary, by Lawrence Norfolk (1991)
- A Case of Curiosities, by Allen Kurzweil (1992)
- Sacred Hunger, by Barry Unsworth (1992)
- The Volcano Lover, by Susan Sontag, (1992)
- Vindication, by Frances Sherwood (1993)
- Mason & Dixon, by Thomas Pynchon (1997)
- Quarantine, by Jim Crace (1997)
- Dreamer, by Charles R. Johnson (1998)
