= Sexing the Cherry =

1989 novel by Jeanette Winterson

- First edition
- Author: Jeanette Winterson
- Language: English
- Genre: Historical fiction, fantasy fiction
- Set in: London
- Publisher: Bloomsbury Publishing
- Publication date: 1989
- Publication place: United Kingdom
- Media type: Print

Sexing the Cherry is a 1989 novel by Jeanette Winterson.

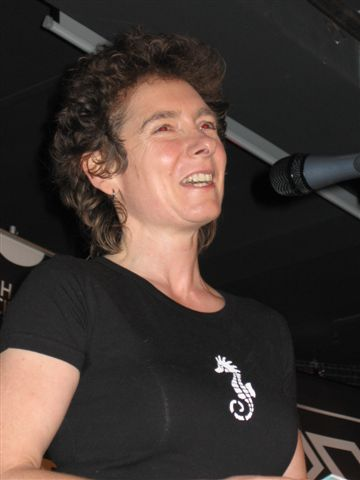
Jeanette Winterson, photographed by Mariusz Kubik

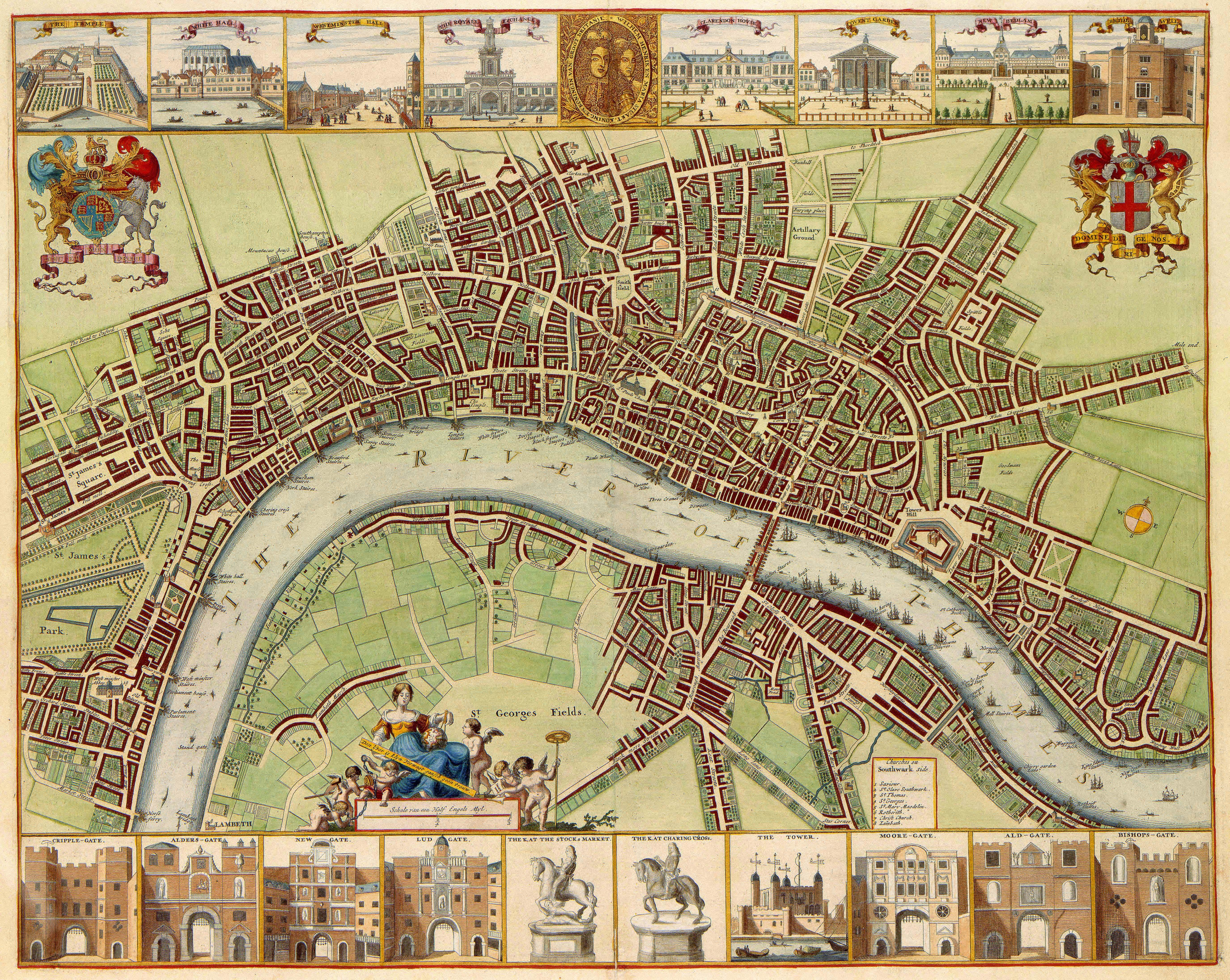
17th century map of London (W.Hollar)

Set in 17th century London, Sexing the Cherry is about the journeys of a mother, known as The Dog Woman, and her protégé, Jordan. They journey in a space-time flux: across the seas to find exotic fruits such as bananas and pineapples; and across time, with glimpses of "the present" and references to Charles I of England and Oliver Cromwell. The mother's physical appearance is somewhat "grotesque". She is a giant, wrapped in a skirt big enough to serve as a ship's sail and strong enough to fling an elephant. She is also hideous, with smallpox scars in which fleas live, a flat nose and foul teeth. Her son, however, is proud of her, as no other mother can hold a good dozen oranges in her mouth all at once. Ultimately, their journey is a journey in search of The Self.

Sexing the Cherry is a postmodernist work and features many examples of intertextuality. It also incorporates the fairy tale of the Twelve Dancing Princesses.

== "The Twelve Dancing Princesses" ==
Within the novel, Jeanette Winterson utilizes the individual stories of The Twelve Dancing Princesses in order to make a statement about the usual, subversive nature of femininity in a patriarchal society. In this reclaimed story, the author chooses to give the women princesses a voice of determination, one that undercuts the nature of the usual fairy tale story ending. In each of the stories that the princesses tell, the male figure is oppressive, dominating, foul, and overall a burden to the women. In turn, the women decide to run away with secret lovers, or to kill their respective husbands in order to live a better life. Through the use of this story, Winterson achieves further contrast to the main characters' story lines given that Jordan is in search of a meaningful link between himself and the gender roles offered in society while Dog Woman is consistently portrayed as a highly masculine character with larger than life qualities that set her apart from the standards of femininity according to societal norms. The narrative of the story exists outside of time, further emphasising the timeless nature of normative gender identities.

== Historiography ==
Jeanette Winterson's Sexing the Cherry has been argued to be an important historiographical novel for women; this novel considers women's role, prominence, or lack of prominence in society within historical fiction. Jeffrey Roessner argues: "The focus of feminist historiographers has steadily shifted from recovering the neglected past experience of women to historicizing the patriarchal values that helped produce such experience." In addition to voicing her concern with the hierarchical structures in society, within her novel Winterson encourages readers to think about sex dichotomies as a thing of the past. With her main characters of Dog Woman and Jordan she achieves a contrasting of the sexes that has been taken into consideration multiple times by scholarly articles such as Roessner's. When considering these two main characters within the novel as a historiography and the context they are put into, what is important to remember is that: "Ultimately...Winterson rejects linear temporality and endorses an apocalyptic urge to escape history and the power structures of a male-dominated society."
