= Mason & Dixon =

1997 novel by Thomas Pynchon

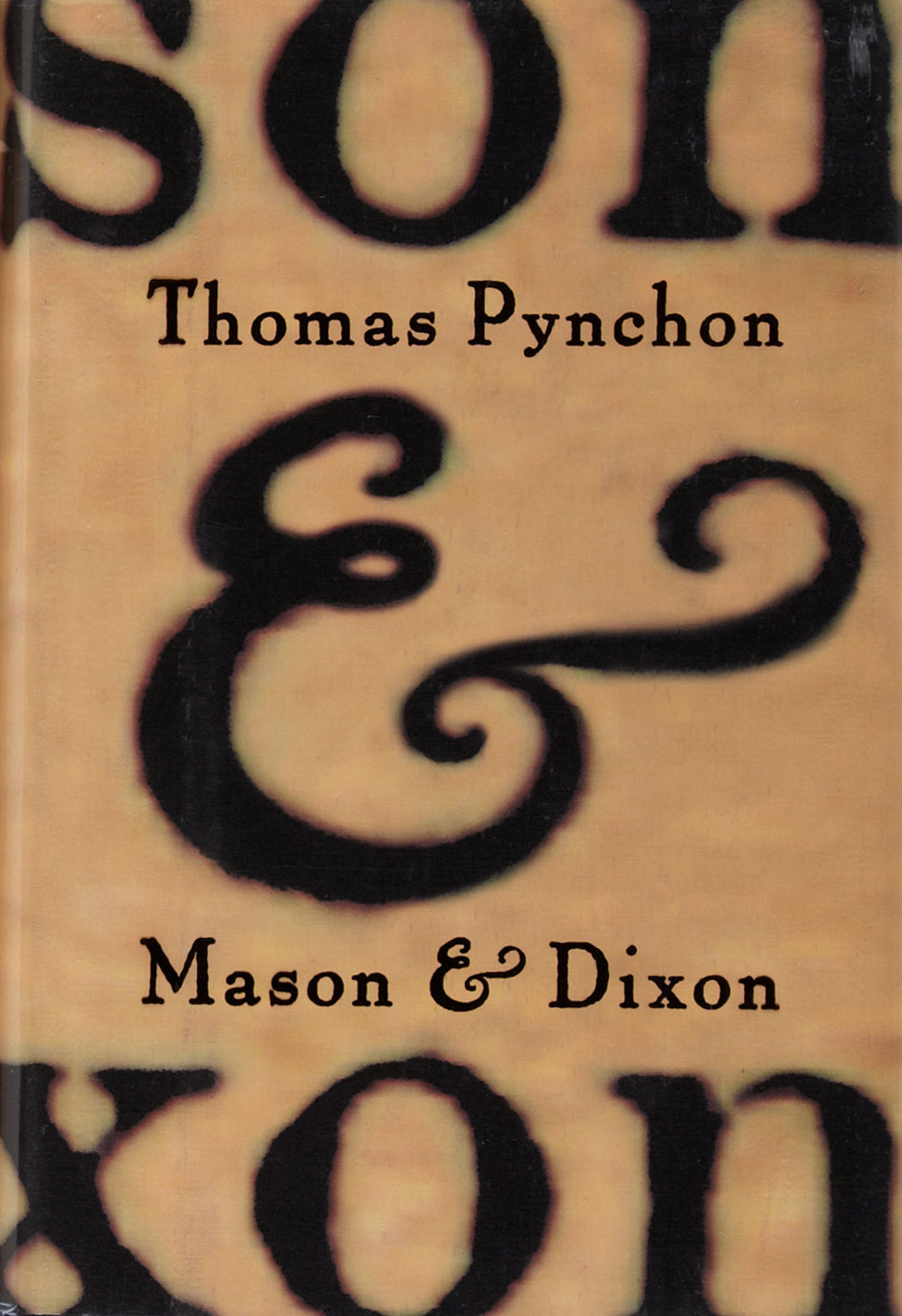
- First edition cover
- Author: Thomas Pynchon
- Cover artist: Raquel Jaramillo
- Language: English
- Genre: Postmodern novel; historiographic metafiction
- Published: April 30, 1997 (Henry Holt and Company)
- Publication place: United States
- Media type: Print (hardback and paperback)
- Pages: 773
- ISBN: 0-8050-3758-6
- OCLC: 36430653
- Dewey Decimal: 813/.54 21
- LC Class: PS3566.Y55 M37 1997

Mason & Dixon is a postmodernist novel by the American author Thomas Pynchon, published in 1997. It presents a fictionalized account of the collaboration between Charles Mason and Jeremiah Dixon in their astronomical and surveying exploits in the Dutch Cape Colony, Saint Helena, Great Britain, and along the Mason–Dixon line in British North America on the eve of the Revolutionary War in the United States.

The novel, written in a style based on late-18th-century English, is a frame narrative told from the focal point of Rev. Wicks Cherrycoke, a clergyman of dubious orthodoxy who, on a cold December evening in 1786, attempts to entertain and divert his extended family (partly for amusement, and partly to keep his coveted status as a guest in the house) by telling a tall tale version of Mason and Dixon's biographies (claiming to have accompanied Mason and Dixon throughout their journeys).

== Background ==
Pynchon began work on the novel as early as 1975, and in 1978 he was reported to be in England researching the lives of Mason and Dixon. Until the release of Vineland, it was long rumored to be his next novel following Gravity's Rainbow. It was formally announced by the publisher in October 1996 with a first printing of 200,000. It was published on April 30, 1997.

== Plot summary ==
=== One: Latitudes and Departures ===
Episode 1

The Reverend Wicks Cherrycoke, at the Philadelphia home of his sister Elizabeth LeSpark, earns his room and board by telling stories to his niece and nephews. The novel opens during the winter of 1786 as the Reverend, by request from his nephews, embarks on his first story set in America, which begins with his recollection of the first meeting of Charles Mason and Jeremiah Dixon as told to him by the two men.

Episode 2

A brief episode in which respective letters of introduction are exchanged between Mason and Dixon.

Episode 3

In the Royal Naval port town of Portsmouth, England in 1761, Mason and Dixon meet for the first time. After brief discussions of their respective background, the two retire to an ale house for libations before their departure on the frigate HMS Seahorse to observe the Transit of Venus from Sumatra as ordered by the Royal Society. Over the course of the evening they encounter for the first time the Learned English Dog and Fender-Belly Bodine, a soon-to-be-shipmate on board the Seahorse. Talk is made over the threat of possible French naval aggression against the relatively undersized frigate.

Episode 4

The Reverend recounts the departure of the Seahorse from Portsmouth and her passage through the English Channel. In open sea, off the coast of France, the Seahorse is pursued and attacked by the French warship l'Grand. After a pitched battle, during which Mason and Dixon remain below decks and the Reverend acts as a surgeon's apprentice, the French unexpectedly and inexplicably break off the attack. The Seahorse, with more than thirty casualties and broken masts, limps back to Plymouth for repairs.

Episode 5

Drinking and paranoia dominate an on-shore discussion between Mason and Dixon. At a loss to explain how they survived the attack and why the French broke off the assault on the outgunned Seahorse, the pair consider reasons for the assault, including the possibility that they themselves were the target. They draft a letter to the Royal Society with their concerns and receive a swift, threatening reply reiterating their original orders.

Episode 6

Ordered once more to Bencoolen, despite its being currently occupied by French troops, Mason, Dixon, and the Reverend find themselves aboard the newly repaired Seahorse, now escorted by a second frigate as far as the open sea. During the passage to Tenerife, and eventually the southern latitudes, Mason marks the second anniversary of his wife's death, and the passengers and crew endure shipboard boredom and isolation.

Episode 7

The Seahorse arrives for a stay in Cape Town where Mason and Dixon are greeted by a member of the local constabulary who warns them against spreading political notions amongst the colony's slaves. Taking their meals at the Vroom household, Mason is the reluctant target of advances from the host's beautiful daughters. Their efforts are guided by their mother, who wishes Mason to become so inflamed with desire that he will consent to sex with the slave Austra and impregnate her, producing a fair-skinned offspring for the slave market. Appalled by the notion, Mason struggles to contain himself and begins to see the colony as a hellish nightmare world. Dixon, however, takes a more libertarian view of the colony and the gap between their perceptions leads the two paranoid astronomers to question how they came to be paired together in the first place.

Episode 8

In a short episode occupied with the sensual, the two astronomers began to seek better food from outside the Vroom house. A tour of various cook-tents and cuisines ends in a marketplace meeting with the Reverend Cherrycoke. Clergy not being welcome in the areas to which she sails, the Reverend informs them over freshly picked mangoes that the Seahorse has proceeded east, leaving the men to observe the Transit of Venus from the Cape.

Episode 9

The rainy season begins with a storm lasting three days. With their father Cornelius trapped out of town by the weather, his daughters renew their flirtatious assault on Mason. They pursue him and Dixon to an observatory constructed by the Seahorse crew before their departure. Trapped inside the observatory by another storm, Mason and Dixon offer a short explanation of the reasons for observing the Transit from different areas of the globe.

Episode 10

The opening of the episode returns to Philadelphia where the Reverend, using an orrery, lectures on the Transit of Venus and the solar parallax. In Cape Town, the skies clear long enough for Mason and Dixon to take their observations. A strange lassitude descends on the colony for several weeks after the event but normal routines are soon restored, even as the Vroom daughters find new objects for their attentions. After several months, Mason and Dixon depart Cape Town aboard HMS Mercury. The Reverend closes the episode by musing whether something other than philosophical or scientific desire drives astronomers worldwide to their observations.

Episode 11

While the Reverend sails on to British India, the Mercury makes port at the island of St. Helena, depicted as a surreal and desolate location. During an evening stroll that takes them within viewing distance of the island's gallows, Mason and Dixon encounter the Lady Florinda, with whom Mason had a brief tryst after the death of his wife. A flashback depicts their meeting a year before at the hanging of Lord Ferrers in London before the episode closes with the introduction of Florinda's fiancé.

Episode 12

The two astronomers spend time with Nevil Maskelyne, who is on the island to make observations but suffers from faulty equipment. Despite political and personal differences, they belatedly celebrate Maskelyne's 29th birthday. Dixon is ordered to return alone to Cape Town, while Mason comes to terms with his orders to remain on St. Helena. Two clocks, one having been with Maskelyne during the transit, the other with Mason and Dixon, discuss the differences between the two locations and the particular behaviors of the titular heroes. The episode closes with Dixon departing for the Cape with the clock previously kept by Maskelyne, leaving behind Mason and the other clock.

Episode 13

Lunar connections and allusions pervade the episode. With Dixon away to the Cape, Mason turns his attention to his new assignment—assisting Maskelyne in his attempts to establish observations of the lunar distance as the preferred means of obtaining longitude at sea. He is unnerved by Maskelyne's account of his former assistant and the erratic and paranoid behavior of the lunatic astronomer. Maskelyne is wary of political enemies at home and conspiracies on the island concerning his appointment and the benefits of being related to Clive of India, a prominent figure in the East India trade. Mason's own paranoia and melancholy wax as he remains on the island, but he manages to maintain enough perspective to falsify a flattering interpretation of Maskelyne's horoscope during one night of drinking at Maskelyne's favorite bar, The Moon.

Episode 14

The episode plays upon relativity, simultaneity, and conjunction. Upon a high ridge of St. Helena, Mason wanders as he wonders whether Dixon has landed safely on the Cape and what he might be about at that minute. Dixon, it turns out, is spending a large amount of time avoiding the consequences of the Vroom daughters' fascination with Mason, who, rumors in town have it, became involved with all of the daughters, the mother, and a slave during his stay on the Cape. Dixon is able to stop Cornelius Vroom from shooting him as a substitute for Mason, and the two spend an evening at The World's End, Vroom's local watering hole. There, Dixon makes first-hand observations on the debauchery that pervades the Dutch of the Cape and glimpses the consequences for the colony's black populace. He carries a drunken Cornelius home and is warned by the daughter Gret to hide the clock he has brought with him because of the contemporary fascination and paranoia regarding the rigors of time and the workings of mechanical clocks.

Episode 15

The first of three episodes that veers between Mason's time on the island working with the frustrated, and possibly mad Maskelyne, and his recounting of events to Dixon upon their joint return to England. Mason and Maskelyne, whose obsession with his faulty instruments only grows, visit the haunting Windward side of the island for observations. Maskelyne tells Mason how a soldier he saved from throwing himself off a nearby cliff now harbors hope that Maskelyne's connections to Clive will get him out of further service on the god forsaken island. Amidst unceasing wind, Mason suspects the soldier is in fact a ghost, and the ghost of Mason's late wife Rebekah visits him for the first time.

Episode 16

Mason tells Dixon how he first met his wife Rebekah at a cheese-rolling festival in Randwick, but his narrative is briefly interrupted by the Reverend's audience who protest contradictions with historical records. Back on the island, Rebekah's visitations continue and Mason soon learns for certain that Dieter, the soldier, too is a ghost and Maskelyne's private specter. He flees to the coast and purchases transport back to town aboard a dhow.

Episode 17

Arriving back in Jamestown, Mason is diverted by Florinda's now ex-fiancé, Mournival, who conducts Mason on a tour of his new enterprise, a museum dedicated to Jenkins' Ear. Presented with the ear itself, said to have magical properties of fulfilling wishes whispered into it, Mason begins to ask for the return of his wife but instead wishes a safe voyage to St. Helena for Dixon. For his part, Dixon later jokes that while still in Cape Town he fancied hearing Mason's wish in the voice of the wind shortly before his departure. The two ponder the possibilities and reflect on Maskelyne's possible madness as they make the return trip to England.

Episode 18

Upon their return to England in June, the two astronomers part ways, with Dixon going north to his family and Mason procrastinating against a visit to his. Shortly after making his way home, however, Mason's mentor and benefactor James Bradley falls ill and dies, occasioning Mason to reflect on his beginnings in astronomy and the real circumstances of his courtship with Rebekah.

Episode 19

The death of Bradley is the topic of discussion at a local pub called "The George" and provides a segue into talk about the 1752 conversion of England to the Gregorian calendar and the resulting "missing" eleven days. Much is made over how days might be done away with and the temporal effect on those who were alive at the time. The discussion grows heated and scientific by turns and introduces a new territory to the book with the revelation that Macclesfield recruited a cadre of "Asiatic Pygmies" to colonize the missing time and preserve temporal flow. The pygmies, Mason states, now live perpetually in the past, eleven days behind the rest of British society and may occasionally be glimpsed moving as ghosts in the present.

Episode 20

Mason visits his father's house and we are introduced for the first time to his two sons. Mason also meets Delicia Quall, a neighbor-woman who believes Mason should give up astronomy, stay in England with his sons, stop grieving for Rebekah, and marry her. Mason's father, a baker, is also present and we learn of his initial opposition to Mason's career in star-gazing. The younger Mason reveals that his next destination is likely to be America.

Episode 21

Mason recalls to himself his early days with Rebekah, his proposal to her, and his elation that she does not disapprove of his profession. He answers his sons' questions about America and his purpose there. Then, in the summer of 1763, he returns to London to begin preparations for his journey and has another brief encounter with Maskelyne, now returned from St. Helena and soon bound for the West Indies.

Episode 22

The episode opens in the Hurworth home of William Emerson, Dixon's longtime mentor and former instructor. After a brief interruption from the Reverend Cherrycoke's audience discussing the magic and commercial prospects in America, Dixon is introduced to Father Christopher Maire, a Jesuit priest and acquaintance of Emerson. Dixon's early apprenticeship to Emerson is recounted, including Emerson's disappointment that Dixon would choose an earth-bound profession such as surveying, before Maire and Emerson appeal to him to accept the commission in America and to agree to regular contact with the Jesuits regarding the progress of the mission. Dixon is reluctant to become associated with the Jesuits, fearing retaliation, but agrees to consider the idea as the episode closes and all three make their way to Emerson's local pub, The Cudgel and Throck.

Episode 23

At Emerson's local pub, with Maire disguising his Jesuit connections under civilian clothes, the trio discusses a variety of topics including China, Feng Shui, ley lines, and a network of ancient tunnels that lies beneath County Durham. Dixon and Emerson recount various expeditions into the tunnels and offer explanations to their use and meaning. Maire's admission that he has spent time in Italy heightens suspicion of his identity but he quickly deflects it by offering to cook the first pizza in England, a ghastly concoction of tough bread, ketchup brought back from the Cape by Dixon, and stilton cheese.

Episode 24

In a reflection of Mason's recollections in Episode 21, Dixon describes the early days of the courtship and relationship between his father, George, and his mother, Mary. Dixon also dwells on the death of his father several years before and the impact it had on his personal and professional trajectory. While journeying down the Thames River, where he will meet Mason to sign the contract that will send them to America, Dixon and the boat's crew encounter a heavy fog that mystically, but briefly, transports them to the hostile shores of Delaware.

Episode 25

After a year and a half apart, Mason and Dixon meet again in London in 1763. Over ale, Dixon conveys his sympathy for the loss of Bradley and Mason reveals that Bradley had been en route to Plymouth to see them off on their ill-fated first journey aboard the Seahorse. The two consider the prospect of danger in America and wonder whether the work they performed since sending the Royal Society their letter of concern after the attack by the l'Grand in some way smoothed over any doubts about their fitness. The two men indulge in paranoid discussion regarding the reasons Bradley may have wanted to see them, hidden purposes for their new undertaking, as well as the various interests that attach importance to their previous and current endeavors.

=== Two: America ===
Episode 26

The intrepid duo arrive in America and are promptly greeted by the sights, smells, and sounds thereof. The Rev'd Cherrycoke's audience interrupts to discuss the variety of evangelical religions that have sprung up under the ministrations of one MacClenaghan and its reflections on the musical influences of the day. The episode concludes with a demonstration of new musical themes upon a clavier and its effect upon revolutionary impulses.

Episode 27

Visiting an apothecary in Philadelphia, the two men meet Benjamin Franklin, who invites them to a coffee-house, a veritable hot-bed of insurrection and revolutionary talk. There, Dr. Franklin introduces them to Molly and Dolly (women of questionable reputation) and proceeds to quiz Mason on Dixon's association with the Jesuits and Dixon on Mason's association with Bradley and the East India Company. The episode concludes with Franklin ushering the two men into a carriage that will convey them to Virginia and a meeting with one Colonel Washington.

Episode 28

At Mt. Vernon, the two men enjoy a late afternoon drink, snacks, and some marijuana with George Washington. The discussion ranges between Judaism, Chief Pontiac, the demarcation of western lines by the French and British, and the telluric plates left by one Celeron de Bienville in his efforts to claim territory. Upon their return to Philadelphia, they engage Dr. Franklin anew and he speculates on their shared goals and the Sino-Jesuit connection that Franklin and others believe is intent on creating a communications network across the continent.

Episode 29

A brief episode that finds Mason indulging in paranoid worry over the Commissioners of the Boundary Line, their roots in secret organizations, and the size of bugs in America. The episode concludes in an ale-house where Dr. Franklin, in the guise of Poor Richard entertains the crowd with an electric dazzle before rushing outside to capture the power of a fresh thunderstorm.

Episode 30

In late December 1763, the astronomers complete the first of their tasks as assigned by the Commissioners: establish the southernmost limit of the city of Philadelphia. Erecting an observatory near Cedar Street they mark the line of the city, and the latitude they will follow west, as 15 miles south of the city. Dixon, in yet another coffee house, falls into conversation with Dolly over Mason's and Molly's shared melancholic personalities, and a series of puzzling measurements that seem to suggest Pennsylvania is moving by degrees each year.

Episode 31

The duo awake one morning and find the city abuzz with news of the Paxton Boys' massacre of Native Americans at Lancaster, not far from Philadelphia. Reminded of the violence on the Cape, and spooked by the militant attitude of the local citizenry, the two men wonder aloud how they might avoid both Paxtons and Indians during their journey west. The Reverend Cherrycoke and his audience debate the original meaning of 'liberty' and the barbaric treatment of Indians by Anglo-American colonists before the episode returns to find a highly caffeinated Mason and Dixon discussing the origins of violence in American society. Dixon likens the current situation of hide-and-seek from various forces to his own childhood reminiscences of the Jacobite networks in Durham.

Episode 32

A brief opening featuring the Reverend's audience (wherein the twin boys Pitt and Pliny are sent to bed) is followed by a lengthy episode centering once more on time and time-keeping devices. Dixon reveals that before their departure from England he was given a chronometer watch by Emerson, the major feature of which is the perpetual motion of its inner workings and the consequent lack of need to wind it. The peculiarities of the watch lead to discussions on Newton's Principia and the laws of motion. Charged with preserving the timepiece by Emerson, Dixon is dismayed when it is swallowed whole by the obsessed R.C., a surveyor linked to a tangent on Mason and Dixon's line. Emerson, informed of the news via a letter which Mason suggests may release Dixon from his obligations, celebrates wildly.

Episode 33

The episode covers a full year of work by the astronomers, opening in January 1764 with the reverberations of the massacre and the attack on Fort Pitt still being felt. Mason and Dixon make their base of operations south of the city near the house of John Harland. There, they erect a new base of observation and proceed to mark off the Tangent Line. The work occasions a discussion of the history of the boundary dispute and various mathematical and political attempts to set the line.

Episode 34

Mason is drawn to the site of the Lancaster massacre, and Dixon accompanies as "muscle." The two consider the specter of racial violence and earn the suspicion of the locals. Fixated on Mason's description of the site, Dixon visits overnight while dressed in Mason's clothes, and prays for retribution to befall the killers.

Episode 35

The Reverend's audience once more raises objections to his story based on historical facts, while the Rev'd himself maintains that history is preserved not in universal acceptance of one story but in the propagation of different interpretations by novelists, playwrights, and poets. Thus armed, the good Rev'd sets the scene for his reunion with the astronomers in a Philadelphia watering hole known as The India Queen. There, the Reverend encounters locals much concerned with religion since the revelation experienced by one of their members who now wanders the west in an attempt to convert others to his vision.

Episode 36

During a nor'easter, Mason and Dixon seek refuge in an inn called "The India Queen" and discover the presence of Reverend Cherrycoke, who now bears a commission as chaplain of the expedition. Decidedly nonplussed by this revelation, the duo welcome his company and proceed to spend the night at the inn drinking, talking, and observing the variety of clientele brought in by the storm while they enjoy the food of its exiled French chef, Armand Allegre. The next morning, before the assembled guests, Allegre embarks on a recollection of his story, dubbed the Iliad of Inconvenience.

Episode 37

Allegre recounts his long apprenticeship to one of the great chefs in Paris, culminating in his own fame throughout France for his various preparations of duck. His fame brings him to the attention of the Mechanical Duck, the invention of one Jacques de Vaucanson. By reasons not entirely understood, the Duck attains consciousness and an exponential leap in its physical abilities far beyond human ingenuity. Thus imbued, it now holds Allegre responsible for the death of all fellow ducks prepared for the dining room table and demands as payment that he assist the Duck by rescuing another of Vauscanon's automaton, a counterpart duck. Ever-persecuted by the Duck, Allegre flees to America.

Episode 38

Back in the India Queen, Allegre's story is challenged by a Mr. Dimdown, but the potential duel is interrupted by the Duck when Dimdown's sword is flung from his hand by an invisible force. A discussion on the Duck's continued ascent beyond the simple physics of its design and Allegre's wonder at the foods in America eventually turns to serious discussion of Christian rituals of communion versus heathen beliefs about cannibalism. Dimdown and Allegre reconcile over comparisons between the layers of pastry and the layered Damascus steel of Dimdown's blade.

Episode 39

Still trapped by the snow, Mason and Dixon open the episode in a quarrel over Mason's melancholy and its best remedy. While Dixon grows fat eating the baked goods of his amorous object, Mason steadfastly refuses to enjoy sensual delights. When a break in the weather permits their departure, the two ride in separate directions: Mason to the north, and Dixon to the south. Dixon journeys to Virginia where Thomas Jefferson offers a brief history on Virginia's own border.

Episode 40

Six years after Rebekah's passing, Mason journeys north into Manhattan and eventually Long Island where he is nearly attacked by a gang of thieves. He pretends briefly to be French rather than British and ends up avoiding unpleasantness by helping to fix the band's telescope. During the course of his work he and the gang discuss actual slavery versus the virtual slavery of contemporary wage-labor, the lack of colonial representation in the House of Commons, and how the British image of America contrasts with the reality. Leaving the group and headed towards Philadelphia again, Mason begins to sense for the first time how public sentiment in the colonies is shaping the future of the world.

Episode 41

The Reverend's brother-in-law, LeSpark, reveals that he briefly encountered the astronomers in the private ridotto of the iron-monger, slave-holder, and inveterate gambler Lord Lepton. Lepton, who fled England to escape his gambling debts, entertains the surveyors at his private castle in the Pennsylvania country side. With concubines purchased from the Canadian convent the Widows of Christ, Lepton's debauched party takes on a hellish air that unnerves the surveyors and makes them anxious to flee.

Episode 42

Dixon proposes to steal one of Lepton's iron bath tubs as compensation for the twenty pounds he believes were unfairly taken from him during a night of gambling. Using magnetic principles taught to him by Emerson, he and Mason attempt to steal the tub but are distracted first by one of Lepton's servants who reminds them of a previous acquaintance and then by the appearance of a pentacle that unpleasantly connects Lepton to the massacre at Lancaster. They make a hasty departure, having taken on new party members, including an electric eel they presently begin to use as a compass.

Episode 43

After several months of surveying, Mason and Dixon return to Newark. They retrieve their correspondence from the previous months and Mason learns that Maskelyne has been appointed Astronomer Royal, replacing Mason's departed mentor, James Bradley. In typical fashion, Dixon consoles Mason who, despite his common background, had hoped his association with Bradley and the work done on the Transit might make him a candidate for the post.

Episode 44

The episode's epigraph quotes the Reverend on the properties of ley lines and recalls Dixon's own scholarship on the topic under Emerson's guidance as the crew speculates on the effects of placing crystal markers exactly upon these mystical points. Several ax-men, many of Swedish origin, are added to the crew and in April the surveyors begin to move west, dividing north and south and even a house as they go.

Episode 45

The Mechanical Duck continues to follow Allegre and the rest of the crew as they survey west. Allegre proposes that the Duck's obsession with him is tied to its paradoxical evolution, in which it both ascends beyond the realm of limited physical ability and is simultaneously bound to more earthly motivations. Mason inevitably and perhaps subconsciously links the Duck's passage from one world to the next, and Vaucanson's efforts to understand the resulting change, to his own feelings on Rebekah's passing.

Episode 46

A morning revue of the crew occasions an opportunity for Mason and Dixon to hear various grievances and offer solutions. One common complaint is the extortion practiced by the prostitutes following the camp. The episode is extended by negotiations between the camp pimp, Nathanael McLean, and the head girl, Mrs. Eggslap.

Episode 47

A heavy thunderstorm is the backdrop for the first half of the episode, which features the standard bickering between Mason and Dixon and some notes on the drawing of Arcs and Tangents on the line. Ordered to extend the Tangent and Meridian, the crew passes into dairy country and young Nathanael in particular is smitten by one of the plethora of fair milk-maids.

Episode 48

The surveyors continue to draw their line, moving back eastward at the opening of the section but always near the Susquehanna River which serves as a boundary of more than one type. In their efforts to close off the Tangent line they discover some anomalies in previous measurements as well as legal inconsistencies that leave a small "Wedge" of ambiguous territory neither in Maryland or Pennsylvania, creating yet another of the novel's uncharted alternate domains. Two "Chain-men", Darby and Cope, attract some attention for impersonating Mason and Dixon in order to seduce the locals. The chapter closes with the discovery of their subterfuge, Squire Haligast warning that the party will soon encounter "China-men," and the delivery of a package from Maskelyne telling of geographical interferences with measurements that forces Mason to recall the windward side of St. Helena.

Episode 49

As they cross the Susquehanna and the colonist population begins to thin, the camp's retinue grows increasingly large and lengthens behind them. The near-Eden of unspoiled country, mystical and mesmerizing, prompts reflection and some paranoia over the future on the part of the duo. Acknowledging their obligations and the compulsory nature of their work, the two wonder whether they are not being used, each favoring their usual conspiracy: religion and the Jesuits for Mason, commerce and the East India Co. for Dixon. They draw near the Redzinger farm and discover that Peter, the wandering apostle, has returned, claiming Christ has abandoned him. The Reverend and his audience close the episode with speculation on the mathematical shape of heaven and hell.

Episode 50

As fall approaches, Mason and Dixon adopt a habit of exploring local roads for taverns and inns at the end of each day's surveying. The episode's main action takes place in one such locale, The Rabbi of Prague, whose denizens consist of Kabbalistic individuals and whose habits and bearings resemble, among others, those of Popeye and Mr. Spock. Passing the evening in their company, Dixon learns of a local golem created by Native Americans and of theories that the American continent was "discovered" as a result of God's retreat at the dawn of the Enlightenment.

Episode 51

An opening that features the two main characters playing practical jokes on one another is followed by a night of heavy rain and fearful talk of Indian attack and The Black Dog, rumored to stalk the wilderness and a possible stand-in for Cerberus. On September 21, the first day of autumn, Mason and Dixon pass over South Mountain on their way toward Antietam Creek. There, they tour a cave system with formations and some ancient and undecipherable writings that produce profoundly different reactions in the polar temperaments of the surveyors.

Episode 52

With the summer of surveying drawing to a close, the camp passes over the west branch of Conococheague Creek, a territory claimed by the Black Boys and echoing with their deeds. Turning back East for the winter, the crew pass near the site of General Braddock's defeat some years earlier. The scenery and passing of the seasons moves their thoughts to the past, causing Mason and Dixon to wonder on the relation between this defeat and the treatment of British weavers rebelling against wage reduction by James Wolfe, hero of the Abraham Plains. The episode closes during winter and New Year with sledding, drinking, and discussions of altitude and unbounded space.

Episode 53

An apparent captivity narrative begins, telling of how an unidentified colonial American woman is taken from her farmstead by nonviolent Indians across the Susquehanna River and north to a Jesuit college in Quebec. There, she begins training to become a Widow of Christ, encounters the intricacies of Jesuit telegraphy, and meets a Chinese Feng-shui master.

Episode 54

The captivity narrative continues, and is revealed as a detour of the story by the potentially amorous young cousins, Tenebrae and Ethelmer, who thus far have listened to Cherrycoke's tale, but are now in Ethelmer's room reading passages from The Ghastly Fop, a pulp series. Tenebrae falls asleep after the American Woman and the Chinese Feng-shui master escape the Widows of Christ, and this narrative merges with Cherrycoke's story of Mason and Dixon, where Mason sees an uncanny resemblance between the woman and his departed wife, Rebekah. A discussion of metempsychosis ensues. Mason then has strange dreams of Rebekah, and decides the American Woman is not so like her after all.

Episode 55

Captain Zhang the Chinese Feng-shui master, convinced the party is being tracked by Jesuits, ignites discussion within the company of various conspiracy theories concerning the line. Included are the possibilities that they are being used by Jesuits to rid the earth of Feng-shui (the line being a terrible example of it, according to Zhang), or guided, perhaps magnetically, to secret ore deposits cherished by the Indians and required for the manufacture of ammunition. Captain Zhang's paranoia turns maniacal; he becomes convinced he himself is in fact the Jesuit spy until debunked by the other members of the party. Meanwhile, the amorous cousins part unrequited, she having fallen asleep, and the main narrative returns to Cherrycoke's telling.

Episode 56

Mason tells Dixon how he visited the missing eleven days that were canceled when England adopted the Gregorian calendar in 1752. He found himself "alone in the material World", without any people, and visited Oxford, finding the city completely empty. He perused the Bodleian Library, and felt that other entities, possibly intelligent, were searching the volumes there. At the end of the eleven days, Mason reunites with Rebekah, and in the present he confides in Dixon that he feels that after his death he will likewise meet her again.

Episode 57

Early 1766. Mason and Dixon again depart in opposite directions for a winter break, this time Dixon heading north to New York, where he runs into the same gang Mason previously encountered there, though they are now somewhat transformed by revolutionary sentiment. Dimdown, similarly transformed, re-enters and Dixon marvels at the breadth of the movement and the possibility of insurrection, discussing grievances against the crown before engaging in a friendly debate over the quality of American versus British beer.

Episode 58

Mason travels south to Virginia, where he revisits with George Washington in a billiard hall and, much like Dixon in New York, discovers conversation monopolized by pre-revolutionary indignation. Mason is then questioned by Nathanael McLean, a former member of his party turned slothful student, about the repercussions, karmic or otherwise, of the line.

Episode 59

The surveyors return to camp in spring from their respective winter destinations to find it in disarray. An episode involving Captain Shelby, a member of their party, performing a shotgun wedding, including details of the preceding fighting and ensuing partying, is related to them.

Episode 60

Shelby, also a surveyor and possibly unstable, accompanies the party westward and questions Dixon about the line. Dixon and Zhang then converse and arrive at the subject of dragons, whence Dixon relates the long tale of the Lambton Worm, conquered by a returning crusader who, following the battle, broke the oath he swore with God in order to achieve victory—an act that left his family cursed for nine generations. The party discuss and interpret the tale, and Shelby suggests, perhaps menacingly, that the surveyors accompany him to a "serpent mound" whose design can only be appreciated from far above, alluding to Dixon's past with Emerson and the ley-lines.

Episode 61

Shelby takes Mason and Dixon to investigate the "serpent mound", which turns out to be a perfect cone, designed and constructed much in the manner of a Leyden jar. Shelby insists it is of both Welsh and Native American origin, and that cryptic markings scratched into its side are warnings to the surveyors, who discover their compasses malfunction while in its vicinity. Back in camp with Zhang, they discuss Jesuit machinations and their possible connection to extraterrestrials, in conjunction with a debate over hollow-earth theories. The chapter ends with a humorous episode in which either Death or The Devil, following the party as a "third surveyor", tries to hire a lawyer.

Episode 62

Stig, an axman in the party, is exposed as spy working on behalf of a group Dixon dubs "Swedish Jacobites", who Stig claims descended from the far north and were the first to arrive at Philadelphia, where they lived in peace with the natives, irking the Americans with their claim to the land and thus somehow leading to the boundary dispute and the line. All this is thrown into relief by Stig's own admission he may not even be Swedish, that he may be a mercenary, and that he believes an armed attack against Philadelphia an imminent possibility. Meanwhile, the party continues west; Dixon, in discussion with Mason and Zhang, notes the only true difference between the individual colonies, and the expedition is confronted by bushmen.

Episode 63

A brief episode involving Zepho Beck, owner of a farmhouse near the line, who, upon the emergence of the full moon, becomes a were-beaver—leading him to enter into a moonlit tree-felling contest with Stig the axman. Zepho takes a massive lead, only to lose his beaver form mid-contest as a result of a lunar eclipse the astronomers had forgotten was taking place. Gamblers betting on Zepho suggest a lawsuit should be brought against them, could it be proven they knew it would happen. Zhang tells them he knows of just such an incident, and begins to relate the story.

Episode 64

Zhang tells the story of Hsi and Ho, ancient Chinese astronomers, who are forced to flee when they fail to predict an eclipse, embarrassing their master the emperor who should have intimate knowledge of all "divine" occurrences. They escape via flying apparatus, bickering all the while, and crash into the estate of a wealthy lord with a "harem" of nubile daughters, who hires them so he can have foreknowledge of celestial events and gain an advantage in business and war. In one version of the story their neglect of their profession leads him to banish them to the desert; in another it leads to his death and their appropriation of his lands, wealth, and daughters.

Episode 65

The surveyors run the line, while Zhang questions the effect of the lost 11 days on the Chinese calendar, and whether it has created inconsistencies and error among all historical time-keeping, leading to discourse on the correct dating of the birth of Christ.

Episode 66

The story carries into 1767, the surveyor's "last year upon the line". First Stig is bizarrely interrogated, and they hear ghosts in the wind, before stumbling upon a barn-raising party where characters including Armand and The Duck resurface. Later they arrive in Cumberland, where they meet Thomas Cresap and his family, hear stories of Cresap's exploits, and discover the town to be essentially lawless and somewhat reminiscent of the wild west, complete with lone sheriff. Mason attempts to converse with a dog, who understands his questions but chooses to ignore him.

Episode 67

The party is joined by a delegation of Indians, who partake in further discussion between the surveyors and Zhang regarding Jesuit methods of forming boundaries. The party is informed by the Indians they will soon reach a mystical "Warrior-Path" they will not be allowed to cross, heralding the end of their journey. The Indians then regale them with tales of an area to the west filled with giant produce and containing a marijuana plant so large its branches support settlements, perhaps as a coded effort to sell the surveyors some of that latter substance. Eventually they are taken there, and discover huge tomatoes and beets, which they reason cannot be God's work and must be the legacy of departed giants.

Episode 68

The surveyors release most of the party, keeping their retinue of Indians and a few others, and continue west with the line, taking a ferry across the Youghiogheny river-lake. The stygian captain of the ferry discusses with them the ghost-fish in the river, his personal tragedies, America's propensity for war, and, to the dismay of the surveyors, points out and makes personal use of the correlation between war and business. The party then ponders what awaits them on the other side.

Episode 69

The Duck, its powers augmented by the negative energy of the line and obsessed with a decoy the party have created and placed upon it, becomes a permanent resident of it. Dixon meanwhile becomes obsessed with infinite westward expansion, and the party approaches the Monongahela River. Meanwhile, two "axmen" are killed by a falling tree. A wide variety of Indian nations take an interest in the party as it passes through their lands, where the surveyors eventually travel upon the "Warrior-Path" amid feuding war-parties. Lastly, Mason and Dixon share a dream of pursuing their path further west.

Episode 70

The surveyors finish the line, and deciding to take their chances, leave the party and cross the "Warrior-Path" in the dead of night to ride to the river, all the while suffering from various ailments and delusions, as well as paranoia they will encounter a similar fate to Edward Braddock. They reach the river and are discovered there by Indians familiar to them, who are returning from scalping Lord Lepton, proving it by displaying his rifle, complete with its menacing and possibly satanic insignia. The party then commences the return journey, heading east amid hardship and difficult weather.

Episode 71

Back in Delaware, the surveyors argue over the significance of the line and its planography while tavern-crawling. They then stay the following year in America, busy with the degree of latitude, chaining a Meridian Line through boggy terrain. Meanwhile, it is intimated that Dixon might prefer to remain in America, and they reflect on their voyages, the commonality of slavery in all their destinations, and the voyage home and what may await them there.

Episode 72

The surveyors complete the meridian line and venture to Baltimore, where Dixon interferes with a slave-driver, first berating him in a tavern before beating him in the street, liberating his slaves, and escaping with Mason, who admires him for his action. They ride north, converse with Zhang, and reach New York, from where they will depart the colonies. Mason is visited again by Rebekah, who presses him upon his duty to her. In New York they are unable to find previous acquaintances, are accosted by a cryptic stranger upon the docks, and set sail.

Episode 73

In an episode conceived in the form of an Italian opera, an alternate, imaginary version of the surveyors' final days in America is relayed where they continue west past the Ohio River, cross the Mississippi, encounter a variety of carnivalesque inhabitants of the interior, and become the first to discover Uranus. Again Dixon wishes to remain, but Mason sees the "new" planet as a ticket to acceptance and a life of ease, so they return east, making all those they met and passed while going west uneasy. In the end Dixon imagines continuing east with the line, and drawing it straight across the Atlantic.

=== Three: Last Transit ===
Episode 74

Mason and Dixon return to London, where they decline, for various possible reasons, to accept another assignment together. Dixon is sent to the North Cape, Norway to observe the return Transit of Venus, while Mason is sent to Ireland to do the same. There, he is conscripted into helping deal with a peat-flow, given to temperamental behavior, and visited again by Rebekah. Upon his return to London he argues with Maskelyne, who assures him their office is no longer what it once was, and accepts another assignment to travel to Scotland.

Episode 75

Mason visits Dixon, who is now home from his assignment, on his way North to Scotland. The two friends fish and drink, admitting finally the strength of their relationship without quite putting it into words. Dixon relates to Mason his trip to the North Cape, and claims to have visited the civilization inside the earth, entering through the north pole, one of many openings to a massive hollow chamber with upside-down seas. The episode then concludes with Mason promising to visit again—Dixon being unable to travel, having come down with a case of gout.

Episode 76

Mason meets Samuel Johnson at an inn on the border of Scotland (a meeting dismissed as fictitious by Cherrycoke's audience), and the two discuss Scotland and America, as well as men like Cherrycoke, and Johnson's biographer, James Boswell, who are always "scribbling things down". The brief episode ends with a vision of Mason's later life.

Episode 77

Mason visits Dixon who is recently married and suffering from gout. Dixon laments that the recent death of his mother and the political turbulence in America have forced him to abandon his hopes of emigration, deciding instead to profit from Britain's growing coal dependency. Mason, himself remarried, confesses that his newborn son unpleasantly resembles his father who has himself remarried a Mary. The Learned English Dog makes another appearance, though he refrains from speech except to declare that he will next visit when the two surveyors are together once again. The two men share a dream of a performance where, in Mason's version, he attempts to introduce Dixon to Bradley, whilst Dixon envisions a duet based on their adventures.

Episode 78

Upon hearing of Dixon's death, Mason and his son Doctor Isaac make a pilgrimage to his grave reminiscent of the journeys the two surveyors previously embarked upon together. The Learned English Dog fails to make a bodily appearance. However, a cat lurks around Dixon's grave with a keen interest in the two Masons. Slipping into senility, Mason finally lets Maskelyne have it, as the two engage in a heated squabble over astrology and the events after Bradley's passing. Mason, now settled in America, is visited by the elderly Benjamin Franklin who is accosted by rantings of Mason's in regards to hidden messages in Bradley's contentious observations. Mason's second wife Mary prays for her husband and returns to England with their younger children, while Doctor Isaac and William, Rebekah's sons, stay in America and see out their father's final days. The story ends as the two brothers reminisce on how they as boys always wished for the day their father would take them to America.

== Reception ==
Mason & Dixon was one of the most acclaimed novels of the 1990s. According to Harold Bloom, "Pynchon always has been wildly inventive, and gorgeously funny when he surpasses himself: the marvels of this book are extravagant and unexpected." Bloom has also called the novel "Pynchon’s late masterpiece." John Fowles wrote: "As a fellow-novelist I could only envy it and the culture that permits the creation and success of such intricate masterpieces." In his review for The New York Times Book Review, T. C. Boyle wrote, "This is the old Pynchon, the true Pynchon, the best Pynchon of all. Mason & Dixon is a groundbreaking book, a book of heart and fire and genius, and there is nothing quite like it in our literature ...". New York Times critic Michiko Kakutani said, "It is a book that testifies to [Pynchon's] remarkable powers of invention and his sheer power as a storyteller, a storyteller who this time demonstrates that he can write a novel that is as moving as it is cerebral, as poignant as it is daring."

During a conversation with Leonard Pierce of The A.V. Club, Harold Bloom said, "I don't know what I would choose if I had to select a single work of sublime fiction from the last century ... it would probably be Mason & Dixon, if it were a full-scale book, or if it were a short novel it would probably be The Crying of Lot 49. Pynchon has the same relation to fiction, I think, that my friend John Ashbery has to poetry: he is beyond compare."

John Krewson, also writing for The A.V. Club, observed, "Whatever meanings and complex messages may lie hidden in Pynchon's text can, for now, be left to develop subconsciously as the reader enjoys the more immediate rewards of the work of a consummate storyteller. Pynchon is one, and he never quite lets you forget that while this might be an epic story, it's an epic story told to wide-eyed children who are up past their bedtime."

In contrast, Walter Kirn of Slate described the book as “tiresome mind games”, criticizing Pynchon’s brand of humor (including anachronisms and flatulence) as unfunny and stating, “The low part of the higher mind that Pynchon so pyrotechnically appeals to (the same part that responds to Escher drawings, P. D. Q. Bach, and perspective-switching holograms) is not a part of myself I’m in touch with, nor do I particularly long to be. I admire Pynchon; I’m wowed by him at times; but the truth is I’m happy leaving him to the experts whose academic labs gave birth to him.“

== Legacy ==
Pynchon's work is part of the metahistorical romance genre evaluated by Amy J. Elias in Sublime Desire: History and Post-1960s Fiction.

Mark Knopfler wrote a song about the book called "Sailing to Philadelphia,” originally performed as a duet with James Taylor.

== See also ==
- Mason–Dixon line
