= Entwined (novel) =

2011 novel by Heather Dixon

- Author: Heather Dixon
- Cover artist: Laura Jade Photography and Becky Terhune
- Language: English
- Genre: Fantasy
- Publisher: Greenwillow Books
- Publication date: March 29, 2011
- Publication place: United States
- Pages: 472

Entwined is a 2011 novel written by Heather Dixon. It is based on the fairy tale "The Twelve Dancing Princesses". Entwined tells the story of Princess Azalea and her eleven younger sisters, and the magic they discover while mourning the death of their mother.

The Queen summons Azalea to her room to give her a silver handkerchief and make her swear on it to take care of her sisters. At the ball, Azalea meets a young Lord Bradford and quickly warms up to him. Her ten sisters, who are all too young to attend, sneak in and watch the event, a sisterly tradition. The ball is abruptly ended by Prime Minister Fairweller, without explanation, and the girls are sent to their room.

The next morning Fairweller informs the princesses their mother died in the night, giving birth to their twelfth sister, Lily. As per tradition, the entire royal family are to go into mourning for a year. The princesses feel suffocated by all the restrictions, especially the one on dancing, which was their favorite pastime. The King goes off to war right after the funeral, leading the girls to wonder if he even loves them.

Months later, Azalea discovers a D'Eathe mark, a remnant of when the kingdom was ruled by the insane High King of D'Eathe, which can reveal secret rooms and passageways when rubbed with something silver, in the girls' bedroom. She rubs the handkerchief on it, revealing a passage with a staircase leading downwards. She wakes the other girls and they all descend. At the bottom they find a forest of silver trees and a pavilion full of enchanted dancers. They interrupt the party and the dancers disappear. The owner of the pavilion introduces himself as the Keeper, and explains he was part of the legendary High King's court, but rebelled and was trapped within the castle as punishment. He allows the princesses to dance to their hearts' content, and invites them to return every night until mourning is over.

Every night the girls dance so much that they wear through their slippers. They're often tired in the morning and late to lessons and breakfast, and constantly stitching up their tattered shoes. When the King returns from war he discovers the girls have been dancing at night, although he doesn't know where. Remembering the Queen's handkerchief and how magical it felt, Azalea makes her sisters all promise on it to never tell anyone about the pavilion. With no other choice, the King allows the girls to continue dancing, provided they don't speak about it in front of him.

One night, the Keeper tells the princesses a story about the High King drinking a goblet of blood and swearing an oath on it to not die until he's killed the Captain General. In the morning Azalea realizes that their watch is missing and goes back to retrieve it. Keeper reveals he's been stealing from them, and refuses to give their things back until they find the magic object that's keeping him confined within the walls of the castle. Azalea suspects the castle's magic sugar teeth, which have been around since The High King was alive.

The princesses start a castle-wide hunt for them, which proves fruitless. Meanwhile, the King puts an advertisement in the newspaper inviting gentlemen to stay at the castle for two days to try and solve the riddle of where the princesses dance at night. The girls are furious, but quickly realize it's only an attempt to skirt around mourning rules and get them meeting potential suitors. All of which prove to be stuck up, boring, or obnoxious.

Keeper once again steals from the girls, this time their mother's brooch. Azalea storms down to the pavilion upon discovering this, and tells him they're never going to come again, having realized Keeper is not as charming as he first appeared. The exit is magically blocked and the pavilion erupts into a wild and violent masquerade ball. As Azalea is being thrown about she sees the soul of her dead mother, leading her to realize Keeper is the High King. He tells her that he'll only release her mother if she finds the object trapping him, and then produces the sugar teeth. Azalea decides not to tell her sisters, suspecting Keeper can spy on them somehow.
